= List of subjects related to the Quebec independence movement =

This is a list of subjects related to the Quebec independence movement.

== List ==
=== History ===
New France – The Conquest – Province of Quebec – Constitutional Act of 1791 – Lower Canada – Declaration of Independence – Republic of Lower Canada – Act of Union – Canada East – Canadian Confederation – Quebec – Reference re Secession of Quebec – More...

=== Events ===
Assemblée des six-comtés – Patriotes Rebellion – Francoeur Motion – Quiet Revolution – Vive le Québec libre speech – October Crisis – Le 15 novembre – 1980 Quebec referendum – Patriation of the Constitution – Night of the Long Knives – Demise of the Meech Lake Accord – Charlottetown Accord referendum – 1995 Quebec referendum

=== World philosophies ===
Classical liberalism – Republicanism – Responsible government – Secularism – Anti-imperialism – Nation-state – Self-determination – Separatism – Decolonization – Direct action – Socialism – Social democracy – Keynesian economics – Welfare state – Supranational union – Cultural nationalism

=== Quebec concepts ===
Quebec nationalism – Sovereigntism – Sovereignty-Association – Pur et dur – Beau risque – The Three Periods

=== Organizations ===
Parti patriote – Fils de la liberté – Frères Chasseurs – Saint-Jean-Baptiste Society – Alliance laurentienne – Rassemblement pour l'indépendance nationale – Front de libération du Québec – Parti Québécois – Bloc Québécois – Québec solidaire

=== Books and documents ===
Declaration of independence of Lower Canada – Pour la patrie – La fatigue culturelle du Canada français – Prochain épisode – Pourquoi je suis séparatiste – Nègres blancs d'Amérique – Égalité ou indépendance – An Option for Quebec – FLQ Manifesto – The Black Book of English Canada

=== Films ===
Comfort and Indifference (Le confort et l'indifférence) — Corbo - February 15, 1839 (15 février 1839) - Elvis Gratton - The Long Winter (Quand je serai parti... vous vivrez encore) - October 1970 - Octobre - Orders (Les Ordres)

=== Songs ===
Un Canadien errant – Gens du pays – Il me reste un pays – Mon Pays

=== Other works and symbols ===
Patriote Flag – Flag of Quebec – Le Vieux de '37 – Colonne de la liberté – L'Assemblée des six-comtés – Speak White

=== Leaders ===
Marquis de Montcalm – Louis-Joseph Papineau – Ludger Duvernay – Jean-Olivier Chénier – Chevalier de Lorimier – Wolfred Nelson – Robert Nelson – Honoré Mercier – Raymond Barbeau – Marcel Chaput – René Lévesque – Pierre Bourgault – Daniel Johnson, Sr – Lise Payette – Guy Bouthillier – Jean Dorion – Jacques Parizeau – Lucien Bouchard – Bernard Landry – More...

=== Intellectuals ===
André D'Allemagne – Andrée Ferretti – François-Albert Angers – Michel Seymour – Michel Venne

=== Artists ===
Henri Julien – Jules-Paul Tardivel – Hubert Aquin – Gilles Vigneault – Gaston Miron – Michèle Lalonde – Jean Duceppe – Paul Piché – Claude Gauthier – Pierre Falardeau – Loco Locass

=== Trade unionists ===
Michel Chartrand – Louis Laberge – Gérald Larose

=== Felquistes ===
Pierre Vallières – Paul Rose – Raymond Villeneuve – Jacques Lanctôt

=== Nationalists for Canadian independence ===
Henri Bourassa – Olivar Asselin – André Laurendeau – Camillien Houde

=== Federal figures ===
Lester B. Pearson – Pierre Elliott Trudeau – Brian Mulroney – Jean Chrétien – Stéphane Dion

=== Foreign figures ===
James Wolfe – Jeffrey Amherst – Queen Victoria – Lord Aylmer – Lord Seaton – Lord Durham – Charles Hindelang – Charles de Gaulle – Michel Rocard – Elizabeth II – Philippe Séguin – Jacques Chirac – Bill Clinton

=== Counter-actions ===
Durham Report – Rebellion Losses Bill – War Measures Act – Partition of Quebec – Option Canada – Calgary Declaration – Quebec bashing – Sponsorship scandal – Clarity Act

=== Influences ===
Age of Enlightenment – French Revolution – American Revolution – Irish nationalism – Upper Canada Rebellion – Decolonization of the Americas – Decolonization of Africa – Black nationalism – European Union – Velvet Divorce

== See also ==
- Politics of Quebec
- Quebec sovereignty movement
- Quebec nationalism
- List of active autonomist and secessionist movements
