= History of the Quebec sovereignty movement =

Timeline of events related to independence for a province of Canada

Location, in dark blue, of Quebec within North America.

The History of the Quebec sovereignty movement covers various movements which sought to achieve political independence for Quebec, which has been a province of Canada since 1867. Quebec nationalism emerged in politics c. 1800. The terms sovereignty and sovereignism were introduced by the modern Quebec sovereignty movement which began during the Quiet Revolution of the 1960s. Pro-sovereignty political parties have represented Quebec at the provincial and federal level, and have held two referendums on sovereignty (in 1980 and 1995) which were both defeated. Additionally, two accords to amend the Canadian Constitution on issues of concern to Quebecers were also defeated.

== Origins ==
Following the British conquest of New France, Quebec nationalism emerged in politics as a result of the Canadien movement (1760–1800). The Patriote movement (1800–1838) began with the founding of the Parti Canadien to counter the Château Clique's agenda of assimilation. The movement culminated in the Declaration of Independence of Lower Canada and the Lower Canada Rebellion (a.k.a. Guerre des patriotes). The secession never materialized, as the self-proclaimed Republic of Lower Canada was quickly re-absorbed into British Canada.

Sovereigntism and sovereignty are terms that refer to the modern movement in favour of the political independence of Quebec, which can be traced to the Alliance Laurentienne of 1957, the writings of Roman Catholic priest and historian Lionel Groulx in the 1920s, the Francoeur Motion of 1917, and premier of Quebec Honoré Mercier's raising the idea of self-determination in the 1890s. The Quiet Revolution of Quebec brought widespread change in the 1960s. Among other changes, support for Quebec independence began to form and grow.

The first organization dedicated to the independence of Quebec was the Alliance Laurentienne, founded by Raymond Barbeau on January 25, 1957. On September 10, 1960, the Rassemblement pour l'indépendance nationale (RIN) was founded. On August 9 of that year, Raoul Roy founded the Action socialiste pour l'indépendance du Québec (ASIQ). In October and November 1962, RIN members formed the Comité de libération nationale and the Réseau de résistance to organize non-violent but illegal actions, such as vandalism and civil disobedience.

Shortly after the November 1962 Quebec general election, RIN member Marcel Chaput founded the short-lived Parti républicain du Québec. In 1964, the RIN became a provincial political party. In 1965, the more conservative Ralliement national (RN) also became a party. In October 1967, when the Parti libéral du Québec refused to discuss sovereignty at a party convention, cabinet minister René Lévesque left the party to form the Mouvement souveraineté-association (MSA). He set about to unite pro-sovereignty forces, and at a congress in October 1968 the RN and MSA agreed to merge to form the Parti Québécois (PQ). Later that month, RIN leader Pierre Bourgault dissolved his party and invited its members to join the PQ.

During the 1960s, many former European colonies, such as Cameroon, Congo, Senegal, Algeria, and Jamaica, were becoming independent. Some advocates of Quebec independence saw Quebec's situation in a similar light. Numerous activists were influenced by the writings of Frantz Fanon, Albert Memmi, Aimé Césaire, Léopold Sédar Senghor and Karl Marx. In June 1967, during a state visit for the Canadian Centennial, French president Charles de Gaulle made a speech from the balcony of Montreal City Hall in which he declared Vive le Québec libre! The phrase was a slogan of Quebec sovereignty, and its delivery by de Gaulle deeply offended the Canadian federal government, which derided him. De Gaulle cut short his visit and left the country.

In February 1963, the Front de libération du Québec (FLQ) was founded by Georges Schoeters, Raymond Villeneuve and Gabriel Hudon, three RIN members who had met as part of the Réseau de résistance. They were inspired by the political ideas of the ASIQ's "independence + socialism" project, and felt the RIN was not extreme enough, making the decision to use violence in order to achieve independence. Between 1963 and 1970, the FLQ conducted over 160 violent incidents resulting in 8 deaths, and were considered a terrorist group by the Canadian government. While the FLQ had gradually gained support over the decade, the October Crisis of 1970, in which a Quebec cabinet minister and a British diplomat were kidnapped, galvanized support against violence while increasing support for political means of attaining independence.

== Early years of the PQ ==
Economist Jacques Parizeau and politician Jérôme Proulx joined the PQ in 1969. Proulx had been elected to the assembly with the Union Nationale party but switched parties in protest of controversial language law Bill 63.

In the 1970 provincial election, the PQ elected its first seven members of the National Assembly of Quebec. René Lévesque was defeated in the Laurier riding by Liberal André Marchand. In the 1973 election the PQ was reduced to six seats, though its share of the popular vote had significantly increased.

In the 1976 election, the PQ won 71 seats and formed a majority government, shocking Quebecers and other Canadians. With one of the highest voting turnouts in the province's history, 41.4 per cent of the electorate voted for the PQ.

On August 26, 1977, the PQ passed two important laws: one prohibited contributions by corporations and unions to political parties and set a limit on individual donations. The second was the Charter of the French Language which provided for fundamental French-language rights.

On May 17, 1979, Robert Burns resigned from the PQ. He had been unofficial leader of the PQ's left-wing faction and a key architect of electoral reforms. He later told the media that he was convinced the PQ would lose its upcoming sovereignty referendum and fail to be re-elected afterward.

== Referendum of 1980 ==
At its seventh national convention in June 1979, the sovereigntists adopted their strategy for the coming referendum. The PQ then began an aggressive effort to promote Sovereignty-Association by providing proposed details (which had yet to be negotiated) on how economic relations with the rest of Canada would include free trade between Canada and Quebec, common tariffs against imports, and a common currency. In addition, joint political institutions were proposed to administer these economic arrangements.

Sovereignty-Association was proposed to the population of Quebec in the 1980 Quebec referendum. The proposal was rejected by 60 per cent of the Quebec electorate.

In September, the PQ created a national committee of anglophones and a liaison committee with ethnic minorities.

Despite having lost the referendum, the PQ was returned to power in the 1981 election with a stronger majority, obtaining 49.2 per cent of the vote and winning 80 seats. However, they did not pursue sovereignty and concentrated on their stated goal of "good government".

René Lévesque retired in 1985. In the 1985 election under his successor Pierre-Marc Johnson, the PQ was defeated by the Liberals.

== Constitutional reform attempts ==
=== Meech Lake Accord (1987) ===
The Meech Lake Accord was a set of constitutional amendments to the Constitution Act, 1982. In 1987, Prime Minister Brian Mulroney and the provincial premiers negotiated the accord, which satisfied all of Quebec's demands. It decentralized the authority of the federal government, allowing the provinces greater influence over policy-making. Quebec's five principal concerns addressed in the accords dealt with the constitutional recognition of Quebec as a 'distinct society', a constitutionally protected provincial role in immigration, a provincial role in Supreme Court appointments, limitations on federal power, spending in areas of provincial jurisdiction, and an affirmed veto for Quebec over any future constitutional amendments. In addition to the Progressive Conservatives' initiative in pledging to reach 'national reconciliation' through constitutional rapprochement and re-establishment of harmonious ties in federal–provincial relations, the Liberals and New Democrats also supported the accord in a House of Commons vote. Adhering to the procedure to ratify an amendment as outlined in the Constitution Act of 1982, the accord was sent to the ten provincial legislatures for approval. However, the accord collapsed due to the failure of the Manitoba and Newfoundland governments to ratify it before the three-year deadline in 1990. The implications of the failed accord caused a greater divide between French Quebecers and English Canada.

Several reasons have been attributed to the accord's downfall, including the indirect and elitist manner in which negotiations were handled, the lack of proper recognition concerning minorities' interests, vague discussion about key issues, weak promotion by the federal government, and deliberate manipulation of the media and public by politicians in support and in opposition. Within Quebec, francophones responded with indignation at the failure of the accord, interpreting it as a rejection of French reality by English Canada. Quebec Premier Robert Bourassa's remarks that "English Canada should understand that no matter what is said or done, Quebec remains today as always a distinct society that is capable and free to assume its own development", which indicated the general consensus in Quebec after the failure of the accord. Canadians outside of the province expressed resentment towards the 'distinct society' clause. There was a widespread sense that only the French benefited from the accord and that it did not address other constitutional issues. Newfoundland Premier Clyde Wells feared that Quebec would use the 'distinct society' clause to assert greater and special jurisdictional authority over what would otherwise be under federal jurisdiction. This was reflective of the commonly perceived notion, held by English-Canadians, that the Meech Lake Accord would bring unevenness and difference to rights and powers, where the intended effect was to introduce equality.

=== Charlottetown Accord (1992) ===
The 1992 Charlottetown Accord was the second attempt by Mulroney's government to bring Quebec into agreement with the constitution through reforms in a national referendum. The accord included a variety of provisions to deal with other Canadian issues. The main terms included parliamentary reform, First Nations self-government, a new division of federal–provincial powers, and a distinct society status for Quebec. Regarding Quebec, the new accord set out to satisfy Quebec's constitutional demands (as presented in the Meech Lake Accord) by providing assurances of Quebec representation on the Supreme Court, a veto over constitutional amendments on federal institutions, and a provision limiting federal powers concerning shared-cost programs, allowing provinces to opt out with full compensation. Quebec was also guaranteed twenty-five percent of the seats in the House of Commons of Canada. The Senate would be restructured to have six elected members from each province and one each representing the territories. Each province would decide how the senators would be selected. Additionally, the equally represented Senate for each province would have suspending veto powers that would cause a joint session with the House of Commons. In the realm of provincial and federal powers, the accord outlined a transfer of jurisdiction over labour-market training and culture to the provinces as well as handing over authority, by provincial request, over the ministerial responsibilities of forestry, mining, recreation, tourism, housing, and municipal and urban affairs. Another major aspect of the accord was the recognized right of Aboriginal self-government as an existing legal body of government. Most of what was included in the Meech Lake Accord either remained intact or was expanded upon in the Charlottetown Accord.

On October 26, 1992, Canadians voted 'No' on the Charlottetown Accord in six provinces, including Quebec, by a margin of 54 percent to 45 percent. The vote reflected not only English Canadians' concern over provincial equality, individual equality, unique status, and the inviolability of the Charter of Rights and Freedoms, but Quebeckers' perception that the accord would only slightly affect Quebec's place within Confederation while not doing enough to ensure Quebec's autonomy within the federal government. Despite the existence of more regulations concerning federal spending, the 'No' side in Quebec were convinced that the accord would legitimatize federal intervention in provincial affairs which could counter Quebec's interests, create overlaps of federal and provincial influence on policies, therefore leading to inefficient copies of policies on similar subject matter. For Quebec separatists, the failure of a further attempt at constitution reform affirmed their position that there were only two choices available in Quebec: the status quo or Quebec sovereignty. Lucien Bouchard, leader of the Bloc Québécois, declared, "There were two roads before the referendum – profoundly renewed federalism and sovereignty. These two options must now find a convergence," though outside of Quebec, many Canadians saw the 'No' vote as an assertion of the status quo, not sovereignty. One of the major effects that resulted from the failure of multiple attempts at constitutional reform was the massive upheaval of the traditional political party structure in the federal government after the 1993 election. The Progressive Conservatives suffered the greatest loss of seats in modern history of industrialized democracies, only winning in two seats, and two new federal parties, Bloc Québécois and Reform party, finished with the second- and third-highest number of elected seats.

== Referendum of 1995 ==
Map of the 1995 referendum by provincial riding. Ridings in Red voted "No", while ridings in blue voted "Yes".

The PQ returned to power in the 1994 election under Jacques Parizeau, this time with 44.75% of the popular vote. In the intervening years, the failures of the Meech Lake and Charlottetown Accords had revived support for sovereignty, which had seemed a non-issue for much of the 1980s. Another consequence of the failure of Meech Lake was the formation of the pro-sovereigntist Bloc Québécois party (BQ) under former Progressive Conservative federal cabinet minister Lucien Bouchard. For the first time, the PQ supported pro-sovereigntist forces in federal elections, something Lévesque had always opposed. The Union Populaire had nominated candidates in the 1979 and 1980 federal elections, and the Parti nationaliste du Québec had nominated candidates in the 1984 federal election. Neither of these parties had official support of the PQ or significant support among Quebec voters.

In the 1993 federal election following the collapse of the Progressive Conservative Party, the BQ won enough seats to become Her Majesty's Loyal Opposition in the House of Commons. Parizeau promptly called a new referendum. The 1995 referendum question differed from the 1980 question in that the negotiation of an association with Canada was now optional.

This time, the Yes camp lost in a very close vote, by less than one percent. As in the previous referendum, the anglophone minority in Quebec overwhelmingly (about 90%) rejected sovereignty, and support for sovereignty was also weak among allophones in immigrant communities and first-generation descendants, while by contrast almost 60 per cent of Quebec francophones of all origins voted Yes (francophones are an 82 per cent majority of Quebecers).

Premier Jacques Parizeau attributed the defeat of the resolution to "money and the ethnic vote".

== Post-referendum ==
The PQ won re-election in the 1998 Quebec general election with little change in seats from the previous election. However, public support for sovereignty remained too low for the PQ to consider holding another referendum. Meanwhile, the federal government passed the Clarity Act to govern the wording of any future referendum questions and the conditions under which a vote for sovereignty would be recognized as legitimate. Federal Liberal politicians stated that the ambiguous wording of the 1995 referendum question was the primary impetus in the bill's drafting.

In the 2003 election, the PQ lost power to the Liberal party. However, in early 2004 the unpopular Liberal government combined with the federal Liberal Party sponsorship scandal contributed to a resurgence of the BQ. In the 2004 federal elections, the Bloc Québécois won 54 of the 75 federal seats in Quebec (compared to 33 held previously).

While opponents of sovereignty were pleased with their referendum victories, most recognized that there were still deep divides within Quebec and problems with the relationship between Quebec and the rest of Canada.

=== Clarity Act ===
In 1999, Parliament passed the Clarity Act, which established the conditions under which the federal government would enter into negotiations for possible secession following a vote by any province to leave Canada. The act gave the Parliament of Canada the power to decide whether a proposed referendum question was considered clear, and allowed the elected representatives of all Canadians from all provinces and territories to decide whether a clear majority had expressed itself in any referendum. It is widely considered by sovereigntists as indefensible, and thus inapplicable, despite being sanctioned by the United Nations. A contradictory, but non-binding and symbolic Act respecting the exercise of the fundamental rights and prerogatives of the Québec people and the Québec State was introduced in the National Assembly of Quebec only two days after the Clarity Act had been introduced in the House of Commons.

Former Prime Minister Chrétien, under whom the Clarity Act was passed, has remarked that the act is among his most significant accomplishments.

=== Redevelopments ===
"Sovereignty-Association" is nowadays more often referred to simply as "sovereignty". However, it remains a part of the PQ program and is tied to national independence in the minds of many Quebecers. It has always been controversial, since some Quebec federalists and Canadian politicians outside Quebec have argued that it is unlikely that the rest of Canada would make an association or partnership agreement with a sovereign or independent Quebec. or that Canada would want to negotiate issues that the Quebec government would refuse to negotiate, such as a partition of Quebec.

In 2003, the PQ launched the Saison des idées (Season of ideas), a public consultation to gather the opinions of Quebecers on its sovereignty project, the new program and the revised sovereignty project adopted at the 2005 Congress.

The PQ lost to the Liberal party in 2007 and 2008 elections.

The PQ returned to power in the 2012 Quebec general election, however they would lose to the Liberals again in 2014 Quebec general election.

The PQ lost in the 2018 election and the 2022 election to the Coalition Avenir Québec.

Polls conducted by Leger and Mainstreet Research in Quebec indicated a rise in support for independence, reaching around 32% from 27% in December 2020. However, this uptick was tempered by the fact that younger voters were no longer the driving force behind the sovereignty movement. Almost half of voters aged 18 to 34 were against sovereignty, while those over 55 showed a statistical tie.

Since November 2023, the PQ has been polling as the largest party with support over 30% for the next Quebec elections. The PQ is pledging a referendum by 2030 if its elected.

The PQ returned to power in the 2026 Quebec general election. The PQ pledged to hold a referendum during a first term in government.

== See also ==
- Distinct society
- Canadian identity
- Vive le Québec libre
- Quiet Revolution
