= Why I Am a Separatist =

1961 essay by Marcel Chaput

- First edition
- Author: Marcel Chaput
- Original title: Pourquoi je suis séparatiste
- Translator: Robert A. Taylor
- Genre: Essay
- Publisher: Les Editions du Jour
- Publication date: 1961
- English publication date: 1962 (Ryerson Press)
- Pages: 101

Why I Am a Separatist is a political essay by Marcel Chaput, a militant for the independence of Quebec from Canada. It was published in French in 1961 and translated into English in 1962.

== Context ==
On September 10, 1960, some 20 people founded the Rassemblement pour l'indépendance nationale (RIN) at the Auberge Le Châtelet of Morin Heights, in the Laurentides region of Quebec. André D'Allemagne was elected president and Marcel Chaput vice president of the new organization. (Note: Chaput 2007, p. 254.) The lectures Chaput gave on the subject of independence as part of the public meetings organized by the RIN placed him in the media spotlight. Contributing to his notoriety was the controversy aroused by the contrast between his political positions and his status as a federal public servant who had sworn an oath of allegiance to the Queen of Canada.

On September 18, 1961, he launched the political essay Pourquoi je suis séparatiste at the Cercle universitaire de Montréal. (Note: Chaput 2007, p. 255.) His book was published by Jacques Hébert of Éditions du Jour. It was translated to English as Why I Am a Separatist some months later and published by Ryerson Press.

== Summary ==
The book opens with an 8-page foreword in which the author invites all "free men" able to rid themselves of their preconceived ideas to read the essay he has to offer, while warning them that they must not hope to find in its pages all the answers to their questions, nor a political programme, nor an accomplished literary work. The essay only pretends to treat of "permanent elements" on the basis of four postulates:

- The French Canadians form a nation.
- The French-Canadian nation is a nation like any other.
- The State of Quebec is the national State of French Canadians.
- To progress, French Canadians must be masters in their own house.

The author discards not only the question of a hypothetical pro-independence political programme, but also that of the "modalities of power", all the while reassuring his readers by declaring himself personally favourable to the birth of a democratic republic. (Note: Marcel Chaput founded the Parti républicain du Québec in February 1963, a little over a year after the publication of his essay)

The substance of the essay consists of 21 short notebooks (cahiers) grouped into six sections. The first section contains six notebooks, the second five notebooks, the third four, the fourth three, the fifth two, and finally the sixth only one.

=== Section 1 ===
Section 1, entitled The Six Dimensions of Separatism, treats of the consequences, for French Canadians, of constituting a minority inside the Canadian federation, through the 1) historical, 2) political, 3) economic, 4) cultural, 5) social and 6) psychological dimensions of their collective life. Chaput believes that the greatest evils caused by the confederation of 1867 are to have distorted, in the minds of French Canadians, the sense of their own borders, and to have made them a minority people. The Canadian nation, a purely political and artificial construction founded, claims the author, on the force of arms and submission, is being erected on the negation of French-Canadian identity. Despite the dark tableau he renders of the position of the French-Canadian people at all levels, the author believes in their capacity to regenerate and calls upon them to choose the highest degree of collective liberty to which they are entitled.

In the conclusion of this first section, Chaput invites French Canadians to learn from the unbreakable will of the Jewish people, who, after centuries of exile, were finally reborn on the land of their ancestors, where they have been building the State of Israel since 1948. He suggests that the first task in the liberation of the French Canadians should be to rid themselves of the symbols of docility and castration that represent, to his eyes, the little curly Saint John the Baptist and his sheep who are paraded every June 24, on the National Day of French Canadians. (Note: Under the presidency of Marcel Chaput, the RIN gave itself a ram's head for emblem, that is to say the sheep of Saint John the Baptist who has become an adult and is ready for liberty.)

=== Section 2 ===
Section 2, The Five Solutions to Our Problem, presents 1) total assimilation, 2) lucid integration, 3) provincial autonomy, 4) true confederation, and 5) the independence of Quebec as the five ways most commonly put forward to solve the existential problem of the French-Canadian nation. The author explains why according to him the first four solutions are less preferable than the fifth.

Assimilation or anglicization, a clear path laid out since the Union of 1840, (Note: The two Canadas, Lower Canada (Quebec) with a French majority and Upper Canada (Ontario) with an English majority, constituted by Westminster in 1791, were united under a single legislature by the same authority 50 years later in 1841.) is proposed to French Canadians on a regular basis writes Chaput. The logic of assimilation is implacable, and those who advocate it among French Canadians share with the indépendantistes having had enough of being "second-class citizens" and being "used as innocent victims in the entertainment of an illusion, that of a bilingual Canada". The assimilationists want French Canadians to put an end to their "diminished national life" by letting themselves be won by the appeal of an all-English life, by letting themselves be vanquished by the arms used in the assimilation of peoples: "interests, thought currents, trends, psychological climates". On their side, the militants of independence claim to wish to end the diminished national life of French Canadians, the bilingualism forced upon them by their dependence on English, not by becoming fully English, but by becoming fully French.

Lucid integration is proposed by the supporters of the centralization of powers in Ottawa, for whom Quebec only is, and could only ever be, a province like any other. For them, French Canadians must conquer administrative positions of importance in the federal government. In doing so, French Canadians would gain the maximum from the system in place, and, with their hands on the levers of control, would be able to give themselves a place in the federation. Chaput cannot approve this option because according to him it is founded on two fundamental errors. First, the population of Canada is not homogeneous: the demographic disequilibrium between the English element and the French element is too great for integration to succeed. Second, Quebec is not a province like any other: it is also the national State of French Canadians.

Provincial autonomy is the solution put forward by a whole legion of "great defenders of the French-Canadian nations" who have fought against the encroachments of the federal government in the jurisdictions of provinces in general and of Quebec in particular. For Chaput, the Quebec autonomist was depicted in the 17th century by Jean de La Fontaine in the fable The Wolf and the Lamb. (Note: That innocence is not a shield / A story teaches, not the longest / The strongest reasons always yield / To reasons of the strongest — "The Wolf and the Lamb", Jean de La Fontaine Fables Online) Like the lamb, the autonomist is theoretically and morally right on all points, but the practical reason of the wolf still wins because the wolf is stronger than the lamb. Chaput forgives autonomists for their too great virtue, but reproaches them for not "following their own reasoning to the end, which can only mean independence". Rendered insufficient by the reality of centralization to the profit of Ottawa, he suggests to autonomists that they trade their quest for provincial autonomy inside the federation for the achievement of a greater autonomy outside of it.

The true confederation is the political ideal which many Quebec autonomists have dreamed of. For the author, there is no doubt that this ideal would be an enormous progress compared to the political status quo. However, when looking up his Quillet encyclopédique (Note: Dictionnaire encyclopédique Quillet, published by Aristide Quillet and edited by Raoul Mortier.) at the word confédération, he reads that all confederations tend to transform into federations, and that a federation differs from a confederation in that the member states dispose of a reduced interior sovereignty and lose their exterior sovereignty. In addition to the danger of a potential slip from the state of confederation to that of federation, Chaput does not believe that true confederation would be easier to achieve than independence, because it would require convincing Anglo-Canadians to trade their position of strength over Franco-Canadians for one of absolute equality with them. They would lose a part of their freedom of action in political matters to the profit of a population numerically inferior to their own. For French Canadians, the author believes, true confederation would be a psychological catastrophe. Only independence can free the French Canadian man from the inferiority complex which paralyses his will and undermine his action.

The independence of Quebec is the solution that follows "from a mere mathematical observation on democracy: the majority wins over the minority." Militants of independence, Chaput at their head, assert that French Canadians are destined to "subjection and mediocrity" for as long as they form a linguistic and cultural minority undergoing the consequences of the political will of a majority foreign to them.

=== Section 3 ===
In the pages of Section 3, The Four Questions Relative to Independence, the author answers the questions of the 1) legitimacy, 2) viability, 3) desirability and 4) feasibility of the independence of Quebec.

Is the independence of Quebec legitimate? It is legitimate, believes Chaput, first because the French Canadians form a nation. The French-Canadian nation has institutions of its own, a territory it possesses by virtue of section 109 of the British North America Act and which it has occupied for over four centuries; it speaks a common language and demonstrates a will to live as a collectivity (vouloir-vivre collectif) which persists after two centuries of British and Anglo-Canadian domination. The French-Canadian people can legitimately choose political independence by virtue of article 1, paragraph 2 of the United Nations Charter, signed by Canada under the government of prime minister William Lyon Mackenzie King and never repudiated afterwards.

Is the independence of Quebec viable? It is not only viable, it is necessary to the economic liberation of French Canadians, the author claims. For Quebec's economy to pass into the hands of Quebecers, they must be able to legislate in matters of currency, banking, taxation, import and export, air, sea and ground transportation, all jurisdictions of the federal State in Canada. As for the resources Quebec would possess after independence, Chaput believes that no serious person could possibly doubt they would allow a people of five to six million to live and prosper.

Is the independence of Quebec desirable? To acquire independence, to obtain international personality, is the "normal" solution adopted by dozens of peoples who have jointed the United Nations since its foundation in 1945. More than simply normal, independence is, according to Chaput, desirable for the same reasons that the Canadian federation, which makes French Canadians a minority, is not desirable. Historically, the independence of Quebec consists in bringing the French-Canadian people to the realization of their destiny, to complete Quebec's transformation from colony to sovereign nation, in the same way numerous former colonies already did. Politically, it is desirable that French Canadians cease to be a perpetual minority and also profit from the advantages of a national government democratically elected. Economically, the independence of Quebec is desirable because it would give to French Canadians mastery over the political means without which, Chaput believes, the achievement of economic independence would "remain a sweet dream". Culturally, independence is desirable because it would then be possible for French Canadians to live in a society that is as unilingual as English-Canadian society is. Socially, independence can only favour the improvement of the condition of life of the people in Quebec, because the liberties enjoyed in the other dimensions of collective life (political, economic, cultural) would make it possible to apply global solutions to the different problems of society. Psychologically, independence would be desirable because according to the author "the problems of French Canada have become psychological problems". For a man as for a people, independence is a state of mind, claims Chaput, and this state of mind would alone wash away half the symptoms of the evil eating out the French-Canadian collectivity.

Is the independence of Quebec feasible? Chaput believes the international political climate to be very favourable to the accession of Quebec to independence. (Note: The book is published in the middle of an important period of decolonization on several continents) Chaput believes that since the cause of Quebec is legitimate, the only thing missing is the will of the people expressed by way of election or referendum in order to meet the conditions of the international community for the recognition of States. It is unthinkable, according to the author, that Ottawa or Washington would repudiate their signing of the United Nations Charter only to counter the entry of Quebec in the community of independent national States.

=== Section 4 ===
In Section 4, The Three Major Objections to Independence, Chaput discusses 1) of the faith of French minorities, 2) the presumed isolation of Quebec after independence, and 3) the political immaturity of French Canadians, which constitute the objections most often raised against the independence of Quebec.

French-speaking minorities, principally of Quebec and Acadian origins, dispersed in the nine English provinces of Canada, often constitute a cause of division and misunderstanding in discussions on the political status of Quebec. Contrary to what is often asserted on the question, Chaput believes that the independence of Quebec would change the situation of French-Canadian minorities for the better, not only in English Canada, but also in the United States and everywhere else in the world. Once sovereign, Quebec, like all other independent States, would be in a position to give itself a policy aiming to protect and support its nationals settled outside its borders.

Quebec would be isolated from the rest of the world by separation, those who are not favourable to it often argue. Chaput disagrees. Far from being isolated by its accession to independence, Quebec would then entertain diplomatic relations, equal to equal, with all other countries. The political independence of nations does not mean autarky, it is not the opposite of internationalism, it is the first condition of any and all internationalism. Without the political liberty of nations, Chaput claims, the construction of large supranational political ensembles is not an enterprise of internationalism, but one of imperialism.

The political immaturity of French Canadians, evoked by detractors of Quebec nationalism in general and separatism in particular, tend to refer specifically to the era of Quebec Premier Maurice Duplessis, in power during 15 years, from 1944 to 1959. Chaput says he stands together with Cité libre's editorial team when they wish for French Canadians to assume responsibility over themselves, and agrees in principle with Pierre Trudeau when he writes that it is more urgent to rehabilitate democracy, attack the ideologies of the clerical-bourgeois elite, denounce the indolence of French Canadians, than to search for the culprits among the English. (Note: Pierre Trudeau, "L'aliénation nationaliste", in Cité libre, March 1961) However, he believes the particular definition Trudeau gives to the word nationalism to be a source of confusion. It is a hasty generalization to reject all nationalisms because a political thought claiming to be nationalist (without truly being so believes Chaput) has produced bad fruits. (Note: Among liberals and in the progressive milieus of all kinds, Duplessis was reproached with having been profoundly reactionary, with having delayed the economic and social development of Quebec, and to have been the incarnation of the cult of the leader, state authoritarianism at the expense of individual liberties, etc.) According to him, to reason in this way amounts to "fighting the Church because of the Inquisition, life because of disease, the rule because of the exception." To complete the liberation programme of Cité libre, one not only needs for a social liberation inside Quebec, but also for the exterior liberation of Quebec, which political separation would bring. Chaput sees there two liberations that are "complementary and indispensably tied to one another".

=== Section 5 ===
Section 5, entitled The Two Options of the French-Canadian Nation, reduces the options available to French Canadians to those of either 1) remaining a minority inside a vast country or 2) becoming a majority inside a smaller country.

=== Section 6 ===
The sixth and final section, The Sole Reason for Our Cause, asserts that the battle for the independence of Quebec is fought above all in the name of human dignity. More than a question of logic and solid arguments, independence is a question of character. Chaput expresses his conviction that the French-Canadian nation possesses the character and sense of dignity of which free nations are made.

== Reception ==
More than 40,000 copies of the book were sold during the 1960s. In Quebec, this represents a significant sales success, particularly for a political essay. (Note: One only needs to sell 1,500 copies of a book in Quebec bookstores for it to be considered a best-seller.) In 1961, the majority of Quebec nationalists, whether liberal or conservative, considered the constitutional future of Quebec only through reform. The option of independence, generally designated by the pejorative term separatism, was not taken seriously. From 1960 to 1968, the thesis defended by Marcel Chaput and other RIN members gained ground in civil society to the point of forcing all political parties to adjust their discourse concerning the political status of Quebec.

== Editions ==
Marcel Chaput launched the essay Pourquoi je suis séparatiste on September 18, 1961 at the Cercle universitaire de Montréal. The book was published by Éditions du Jour. Jacques Hébert, owner of Éditions du Jour, friend of Pierre Trudeau, is far from being sympathetic to the political opinion expressed by Chaput. It was with the intention to publish a refutation of the new separatist discourse that he ordered a manuscript from Chaput for July 17, 1961. (Note: Chaput 2007, p. 239.) The cover page of the first edition was imposed on the author, who protested in a notice on the book's first page. The cover presented a green maple leaf, torn in two parts, on a red background. In 1962, the Éditions du Jour published Pourquoi je suis antiséparatiste by Jean-Charles Harvey in response to Chaput's essay. The cover of Harvey's book depicted two maple leaf halves, one blue, one red, fastened together by a safety pin. (Note: Chaput 2007, p. 171.)

Pourquoi je suis séparatiste was reprinted by the same publisher in 1969 for the 40,000th copy. This edition had a blue, white and black cover.

A revised and expanded edition was published by Éditions Bibliothèque québécoise in 2007. It is prefaced by Michel Venne, director general of Institut du Nouveau Monde, annotated by Sylvie Chaput (Note: Daughter of Marcel Chaput, author, translator) and annexed with four other of Marcel Chaput's political texts (Note: The texts are: Les minorités canadiennes-françaises face à l'indépendance du Québec (1961), Liberté, souveraineté et internationalisme (1961), L'avenir du Canada : séparation, intégration ou ...? (1961), Mémoire présenté à titre personnel par Marcel Chaput au Comité parlementaire de la Constitution (1964)) (Note: "Pourquoi je suis séparatiste", in Google Books, retrieved July 11, 2010)

== Translations ==
An English translation by Robert A. Taylor was published by Ryerson Press in February 1962, under the title Why I Am a Separatist. It was later published by UMI in 1970 and Greenwood Press in 1975 (Note: "Why I am a separatist", in Google Books, retrieved July 11, 2010)
