= Marcel Chaput =

Canadian politician

- Born: October 14, 1918; Hull, Canada
- Died: January 19, 1991 (aged 72); Montreal, Canada
- Education: Ph.D. in biochemistry, Master's degree in psychology, Ph.D. in naturopathy
- Occupations: technician and researcher in biochemistry, journalist, editor, writer, teacher, naturopath, political activist
- Awards: Patriot of the Year Award in 1975; Bronze medal of the MNQ in 1983

Marcel Chaput (October 14, 1918 – January 19, 1991 (Note: "Marcel Chaput (1918–1991) Homme de science, homme politique ", in Bilan du Siècle, Université de Sherbrooke, retrieved June 5, 2008)) was a scientist and a militant for the independence of Quebec from Canada. Along with some 20 other people including André D'Allemagne and Jacques Bellemare, he was a founding member of the Rassemblement pour l'indépendance nationale (RIN).

== Biography ==
=== Family and education ===
Marcel Chaput was born in Hull, Quebec on October 14, 1918. (Note: Côté 1979, chap. 1.) His mother was Lucia Nantel, and his father, Narcisse Chaput, was a proofreader at Her Majesty's Printer in Ottawa. (Note: Chaput 2007, p. 253.) He was the youngest child and sole boy in a family of seven children. He did not know three of his sisters, who died at a young age. The three sisters he knew were Rolande, Gabrielle and Madeleine. He was ten years old when his sister Rolande, 16, died of sepsis. (Note: Côté 1979, chap. 2.)

After doing his primary schooling at École Lecomte, he entered the Collège Notre-Dame de Hull. He was enrolled in the cadet corps of his college. One of his teachers, Brother Ernest, led him to an interest in science. From that time he cherished the dream of being a chemist. In 1934, he joined the Groupe Reboul (Note: Named in honour of father Delisle Reboul.) of the Association catholique de la jeunesse canadienne-française.

In September 1933, he left his college in Hull and registered at the High School of the University of Ottawa, an institution which he left only two years later to enter, in September 1935, the École technique de Hull which trained chemistry laboratory technicians at the time. He stayed there until graduation in 1939.

Chaput claims to have become a partisan of the independence of Quebec as part of the Groupe Reboul while preparing for a public debate on the subject of separatism. He and his team member Jacques Boulay had to argue for separatism in a debating contest against two comrades, Roland Dompierre (Note: Father of famous Quebec musician François Dompierre.) and Réal Denis. His team lost the debate held on December 10, 1937, but the readings he did to learn about the subject (Séparatisme, doctrine constructive by Dostaler O'Leary, old issues of the paper La Nation by Paul Bouchard, history books on the Patriots of the 19th century) convinced him of the merit of the idea in itself. He considered that he and the other pioneers of the contemporary movement for the independence of Quebec did nothing but update an idea that goes back to the British conquest of French Canada in 1760. (Note: Côté 1979, chap. 5.)

=== Technician ===
He had been working at the Eddy paper manufacture since May 1939 when the National Research Council (NRC) of Canada granted him a job interview in the month of December of the same year. He was hired as chemistry laboratory aid to doctor Richard Helmuth Fred Manske for a salary of $70 CAD per month. Meanwhile, he was enrolled in the Canadian Army due to conscription. (Note: Côté 1979, chap. 3.) In May 1941, he was mobilized at the Saint-Jérôme military camp. His training as a doughboy was interrupted when the federal government decided to employ all technicians in the war effort. He therefore returned to the NRC labs. He entered the service of the Canadian Army's Chemical Warfare Laboratories in January 1943. When he returned home to Hull at the end of the war, he was a sergeant major.

=== Marriage ===
On September 15, 1945, he married Madeleine Dompierre, daughter of Odias Dompierre and Marie-Méa Marquis, at the Notre-Dame-de-Grâce Catholic Church in Hull. The couple spent six days cruising on the Saint Lawrence River and Saguenay River. Their first son, Luc, was born in the fall of 1946. Later came Danielle (1949), Sylvie (1952) and Jérôme (1955). (Note: Chaput 2007, p. 254.)

=== Doctorate ===
In September 1946, he moved to Peterson Residence, a disaffected aviation camp acquired by McGill University in Lachine. The living conditions in the student's residence for married veterans were poor. After suffering from pleurisy, the doctor ordered his wife to leave the overheated rooms where the Chaput family was living and take some rest. Madeleine packed her things and returned to Marcel's parents in Hull, while he rented a room in Montreal in the neighbourhood of McGill. During his study years, he left Montreal for Hull every weekend to see his wife and children. He received his Ph.D. in biochemistry from McGill University on October 6, 1952. His doctoral thesis was on calcium and the alpha cells of the pancreas.

=== Return to NRC ===
After receiving his Ph.D., he returned to Hull and began working for the NRC in Ottawa again. He initially resumed the same work he had been doing during the war, then transferred to the department of chemical research in Shirley Bay. In 1955, he transferred to the Defence Research Board, where he performed operational research.

In October 1958, he signed a secret study entitled The Proportion of French-Canadian Soldiers in the Canadian Army. (Note: Chaput 2007, p. 245.) This study would have helped General Jean-Victor Allard to convince the federal government to create francophone units in the Canadian Army. He signed another study on the same subject in October 1960 (Note: The study is entitled A Study of Promotion Examination Results for French-Speaking and English-Speaking Canadian Army Infantry Officers, Ottawa, MDN, CAORE Report number 110, October 1960)

From 1953 to 1959, in parallel to his lab work, he completed the studies of a masters in psychology at the Institute of Psychology of the University of Ottawa.

=== Foundation of the RIN ===
After reading "Où va le Canada français? L'exercice de la pleine souveraineté est essentiel à l'épanouissement du Québec" (Note: Where is French Canada going? The exercise of full sovereignty is essential to the blooming of Quebec) by Raymond Barbeau, interviewed by Jean-Marc Léger in Le Devoir, Chaput was determined to enter into contact with Barbeau, founder of the Alliance laurentienne. Chaput invited Barbeau to hold a conference in Hull on August 28, 1959, in an old parish room of the Notre-Dame Church. Some twenty people were present. Chaput met André D'Allemagne at this time. Barbeau invited Chaput to give a short speech in the Saint-Stanislas room of Montréal on September 13, 1959 as part of a soirée organized to commemorate the 200th anniversary of the Battle of the Plains of Abraham. (Note: Côté 1979, chap. 6.)

During that period, although his patriotic and charitable activities were numerous, (Note: In his native region of Outaouais of which Hull is one of the main towns, he founded or lead several organizations: the Alliance française chapter of the Ottawa-Hull region, the Institut des sciences, the Société des conférences, the Emmaüs Movement, etc. — Chaput 2007, p. 254) his militant activity for independence was limited to writing letters in newspapers on the topic of the hour. He wanted to do much more. He wrote a memoir to the attention of the chancellerie of the Ordre de Jacques Cartier (OJC), a secret organization of which he was a member. In response to Chaput's initiative, Pierre Vigeant, editorialist at Le Devoir and grand chancelier of the OJC, created a study committee on the question of independence of Quebec. Chaput was part of a group of five commissioners who gathered in Montreal in December 1959 and January 1960. As secretary to the commission, Chaput wrote the final report which concluded that French Canadians enjoy the right to self-determination and that members of the OJC should feel free to support independence if such was their political conviction. The direction of the OJC however remained closed to the idea of independence. On March 17, 1961, he was expelled from the secret organization after having insisted on learning the position of the Order on constitutional and political matters.

On May 7, 1960, Chaput presided a meeting that received Raymond Barbeau as speaker at the Le Grenier theatre in Hull. Following the meeting, there were discussions on the possibility to form a Club Laurentie in Hull, but after reflecting on the matter for a while the small group of independence supporters in Hull decided to remain autonomous.

On September 10, 1960, he took part with 20 other people to the foundation of the Rassemblement pour l'indépendance nationale (RIN) which took place at the Auberge Le Châtelet in Morin Heights in the Laurentides. He was elected vice president of the RIN.

After having participated in the organizing of a parade for independence in the streets of Montreal which took place on February 11, 1961, he gave a conference entitled Le Canada français à l'heure de la décision (Note: French Canada at the Hour of Decision) as part of a public meeting held at the Gesù on April 4, 1961, during a Stanley Cup semi-final. (Note: Montreal lost 3 to 0 against Chicago and was taken out of the playoff) The RIN rejoiced at being able to fill up a room under such circumstances. Pierre Bourgault also gave a speech that night. (Note: Côté 1979, chap. 7.)

On May 23, 1961, he again spoke as part of a public meeting organized by the RIN, this time at the Ermitage in Montreal. His conference was entitled Quand deux nationalismes s'affrontent. (Note: When Two Nationalisms Face Each Other)

=== Suspension ===
Chaput's increasingly active involvement in public affairs did not fail to grab the attention of his employer, the federal government in Ottawa. In the House of Commons of the Parliament of Canada, Douglas Fisher, NDP Member of Parliament for Port Arthur in Ontario, asked Minister of National Defense Douglas Harkness about a certain doctor Chaput. Harkness was forced to admit that the Marcel Chaput, public speaker promoting the independence of Quebec was the same Marcel Chaput employed by his department. (Note: Debates of the House of Commons of Canada (Hansard), 24th Parliament, 4th Session, question number 266, p. 3941) The Parliament of Canada took interest in his case again after some French-speaking MPs received invitations to attend a public meeting of the RIN announced for May 30, 1961 at the École normale de Hull. The day of the event, Chaput was called in the office of doctor Keyston, vice-president of the Defence Research Board, and was threatened with firing if he gave his talk. Knowing that Keyston did not have the powers to fire him, he decided the give his talk as planned. (Note: Côté 1979, chap. 8.)

He took three weeks of vacation during the summer and dedicated his free time to the writing of a book. On September 18, 1961, he launched the political essay Pourquoi je suis séparatiste at the Cercle universitaire de Montréal. (Note: Chaput 2007, p. 255.) His book was published by Jacques Hébert of Éditions du Jour. It was translated into English as Why I Am a Separatist some months later.

The general student association of Université Laval invited him to participate to the Canadian Affairs Conference, an event conducted under the honorary patronage of the Governor General of Canada. Several political figures gave speeches during the conference, among them Jean Lesage, Davie Fulton and René Lévesque. The talk Chaput was scheduled to give was on Friday November 17, a working day. He asked for a day off without pay, but Keyston, still his superior, refused. He was suspended from his research functions for two weeks – without pay – after he decided to attend the Canadian Affairs Conference anyway. On Monday December 4, 1961, day of his return to work after his suspension, he resigned.

=== President of the RIN ===
On October 28, 1961, shortly before he resigned his job, he was elected President General of the RIN during the organization's annual congress in Montreal. Under his presidency, the RIN gave itself an emblem, founded the journal L'indépendance and created a political committee which prepared the programme adopted by members during the annual congress of October 1962.

On January 7, 1962, he quit Hull and settled in Montreal to maintain basic operations for the RIN. He continued to give talks here and there, usually with Pierre Bourgault. Although it never missed a chance to attack Premier Jean Lesage and all federalists in Quebec City or in Ottawa, the RIN adopted resolutions as part of a special congress on June 9 and 10 – to support the government of Quebec in its project to nationalize electricity companies. When during fall Jean Lesage announced there would be general elections on November 14, Chaput thought the time right to present himself as candidate for the RIN in the electoral district of Bourget. On September 30, the RIN took the unanimous decision to support his candidacy, but as an independent candidate, not as candidate of the RIN. The majority of RIN members did not think the time had come to turn their organization into a political party. (Note: Côté 1979, chap. 10.)

On Saturday October 20, during a congress held in the gymnasium of the Collège Mont-Saint-Louis, Guy Pouliot succeeded Chaput in the presidency of the RIN. Chaput remained an executive, but refused one of the two vice-presidencies he was offered.

On November 14, 3,299 voters of Bourget supported Marcel Chaput, who improvised an electoral campaign with $2,500 CAD and dozens of volunteers. He was not elected Member of Parliament, but judged the experience instructive and useful to the independence movement.

He proposed to the RIN the creation of a position of political organizer, but the council rejected his proposal, still of opinion that the time had not yet come to be active in the political arena. He decided to quit the RIN on December 17, 1962 in order to dedicate all his energies to the foundation of a pro-independence political party.

=== Foundation of the PRQ ===
On February 23, 1963, he called a press conference to announce the opening of the office of the Parti républicain du Québec (PRQ). The PRQ gave itself a constitution, a political programme and a journal, Le Républicain. Chaput announced that the first congress of the PRQ would be held on March 16 and 17 at Queen Elizabeth Hotel in Montreal. (Note: Côté 1979, chap. 11.)

On March 3, 1963, the RIN resolved to become a political party.

On May 7, Raymond Barbeau announced in a press conference that he decided to dissolve the Alliance laurentienne to unite the strength of its members to that of the PRQ. In June, the PRQ permanent office moved from the 2nd floor of the old baseball stadium on rue de Lorimier to 4270, rue Papineau.

=== Hunger strikes ===
The PRQ rapidly accumulated a debt of $50,000 following the purchase of advertising time on television in April, May and June. To finance the party, Chaput took the decision to go on a hunger strike. He announced it publicly on July 8, 1963. (Note: Côté 1979, chap. 12.)

His first hunger strike lasted 33 days, from Monday July 8 to Saturday August 10, 1963. The PRQ's chest filled up with $100,000 CAD. He started a second fast on November 18, 1963. He interrupted it after 63 days, on January 21, 1964, at the insistence of his entourage and sympathizing journalists. The PRQ however only gained $20,000 with his second fast and consequently he resigned his position as party leader. During the period of his two fasts he often made the headlines and continued to be invited to give talks on the subject of independence for Quebec.

=== Seeking employment ===
After the dissolution of the PRQ on January 21, 1964, Chaput dedicated his time to searching for employment to support his family. Since his resignation as a civil servant in December 1961, he had been living on his own savings and an insufficient public service pension to meet the needs of his wife and children. The task of finding a new job turned out to be difficult and he held various non permanent jobs. His label of "separatist" closed many doors to him. Two insurance companies and one mutual fund company, though interested in him because of his notoriety, refused to hire him in the end because, he was told, the direction feared losing the Anglophone clientele. At the end of the March 1964, his friend Jacques Lamarche suggested he apply for a teaching position with the Fédération des collèges classiques. He never received an answer from the federation. Lamarche therefore invited him to join him at the journal Le Laissez Passer published by the Conseil d'expansion économique (CEE), at the time presided by Sarto Marchand and directed by Bernard Tessier. After much negotiation, the direction of the CEE accepted that Chaput collaborates in the journal, but under a pseudonym. Under the name Gilles Côté, he participated to the publication of two economic dossiers during the summer of 1964, the first on general insurance, the second on life insurance. The direction of the CEE eventually came under a new leadership who learned that Chaput was being employed by the organization. He was fired and never paid for the work he had already performed. (Note: Côté 1979, chap. 13.)

A sympathizer of the RIN, José Leroux, principal of the private Collège Valéry, offered him a position as teacher of biology and history. He taught part-time between September 1964 and spring 1965. He continued to search for a more stable employment the whole year but without success.

On February 5, 1965, in a moment of discouragement, he addressed a public letter to the media to lament the fate Quebec society reserved to those who advocated independence. His letter had some effect. Interesting offers were made to him from outside Quebec, but he did not wish to live in exile. The only serious offer than was made to him from Quebec was that made by Doctor Elliot, one of his teachers at McGill University, who had since then become dean of the Department of Biochemistry, who offered him the direction of a research chair. He refused the job on principles, asserting he did not wish to work in English in Quebec, and also for pragmatic reasons, because he wished for a flexible schedule that would allow him to continue his militancy for independence in his spare time.

In 1966, his wife entered the job market while he started studying naturopathy. It is only in 1968 that he found a permanent job through an association with Eugène Caraghiaur, with whom he founded Pétro-Montréal, a company delivering heating oil. He was shareholder, director and seller for this company until he his retirement in 1983.

During the year 1965, he launched J'ai choisi de me battre: petite histoire très personnelle du séparatisme québécois, de Maurice Duplessis à Claude Wagner, a book of 160 pages, published by Club du livre du Québec in Montreal.

=== Return to RIN ===
He returned to the RIN in August 1965, at the invitation of Pierre Bourgault, who was president of the party at the time. The RIN presented him as candidate in the electoral district of Papineau for the Quebec general election of 1966. He came in third behind Roland Théorêt of Union nationale and Bernard Desrosiers of the Parti libéral du Québec, with 2,504 votes (10.32%). (Note: "Élections dans Papineau (1923–1973)", in QuébecPolitique.com, retrieved July 13, 2010)

He continued as a simple militant of the party until its dissolution in October 1968.

=== Parti Québécois ===
In October 1968, two weeks after the founding congress of the Parti Québécois (PQ), the members of the RIN gathered and voted the dissolution of their party. Most RIN militants became members of the PQ. Marcel Chaput was one of those who made that choice.

He held a weekly editorial column in Le Journal de Montréal from 1968 to 1970.

On December 11, 1969, he took part in the "manif anti-manif" (Note: Anti-demonstration demo) organized by poet Gaston Miron to denounce the municipal regulation forbidding public demonstrations in the streets of Montreal. (Note: A regulation promulgated on November 12, 1969.) With several others, he was arrested by the police of Montreal and imprisoned. Regulation 3926, contested in court, was declared unconstitutional by the Quebec Superior Court, before being finally declared constitutional, several years later, by the Supreme Court of Canada. (Note: "Dupond v. City of Montreal et al.", in Judgments of the Supreme Court of Canada, LexUM, retrieved July 13, 2010)

In the spring of 1970, he presented himself as candidate for nomination by the PQ in the electoral district of Maisonneuve. It was however Robert Burns who won the nomination and was subsequently elected MNA on April 29.

He held a political column entitled "La comédie canadienne" in the weekly Point de mire during the year 1971.

He presented himself as candidate for nomination by the PQ in the electoral district of Terrebonne in 1973, but Guy Mercier was elected. Mercier did not however win a plurality of votes at the election of October 29.

In 1975, he and his wife Madeleine received the first Patriot of the Year award given by the Saint-Jean-Baptiste Society of Montréal.

He was chief editor ofIci Québec magazine in 1977.

=== Naturopathy ===
From 1968 to 1970, after receiving a Ph.D. in naturopathy from the Institut de naturopathie du Québec, he was a consultant at the Clinique naturiste de Montréal. (Note: Raymond Barbeau is founder of the Institut de naturopathie du Québec and the Clinique naturiste de Montréal) During that period, he published the book L'école de la santé and in collaboration with chemist Tony Le Sauteur, Dossier pollution. He was editor of La Santé, a paper doing popular education on health matters.

=== Death ===
He suffered from Parkinson's disease at the end of his life. He died at Hôpital Jean-Talon in Montreal on January 19, 1991. His funeral took place at Église Notre-Dame-du-Rosaire in the Villeray neighbourhood. André D'Allemagne pronounced a funeral oration to his memory on the day of his funeral. He was buried at the Notre-Dame de Hull cemetery on January 25, 1991. (Note: Chaput 2007, p. 259.)

== Publications ==
=== Essays ===
- Pourquoi je suis séparatiste (1961)
- Why I Am a Separatist (1962)
- J'ai choisi de me battre: petite histoire très personnelle du séparatisme québécois de Maurice Duplessis à Claude Wagner (1965)
- L'école de la santé (1969)
- Dossier pollution (1971) with Tony LeSauteur
- Les citations de René Lévesque (1977) with Jean Côté
- Référendum de René Lévesque (1979) with Jean Côté

=== Periodicals ===
- L'indépendance (1962–1968)
- Le Républicain (1963)
- Ici Québec (1977–1978)

=== Articles ===
- "La révolution en marche", in L'Homme nouveau (1964)
- "Les indépendantistes doivent-ils quelque chose à Duplessis?", in Ici Québec (1977)
- "Par son génie musical, cet enfant devrait étonner le monde", in Ici Québec (1978)
- "Référendum. Dossier spécial", in Ici Québec (1978)

=== Other ===
- Manifeste du Parti républicain du Québec (1963)
- Mémoire présenté à titre personnel par Marcel Chaput au Comité parlementaire de la constitution (1964)

== Distinctions ==
- 1975 – Patriot of the Year award by the Saint-Jean-Baptiste Society of Montreal
- 1983 – Bronze medal of the Mouvement national des Québécoises et Québécois awarded by the SNQ of Outaouais
- 1995 – A street of the former City of Hull (today Gatineau) was baptized in his honour
