= Collège Stanislas =

Collège Stanislas may refer to:

In France:

- Collège Stanislas de Paris, Paris
- Institution Stanislas (Nice), Nice
- Institut Stanislas (Cannes), Cannes

Outside France:

- Collège Stanislas (Quebec), with two locations in Quebec, Canada
- Stanislascollege, Netherlands
