= Parti républicain du Québec =

Canadian political party

The Parti républicain du Québec (French pronunciation: [paʁti ʁepyblikɛ̃ dy kebɛk], PRQ; English: Quebec Republican Party) was a political party that advocated the independence of Quebec from Canada. The PRQ was founded in November 1962 by Marcel Chaput, who was also one of the founders of the Rassemblement pour l'indépendance nationale in 1960.

At the time, the RIN was not a political party, only a political movement, and the executive had refused to run candidates in elections. Chaput believed that independentist movement should run candidates in general elections. He had run in the 1962 Quebec election as an unaffiliated candidate. Shortly after the election, he founded the PRQ. Quickly, the party was plagued by financial problems, and it never achieved the goal of gathering all the sovereigntist forces. The Parti républicain du Québec folded in 1964 without contesting a single election. The same year, the Rassemblement pour l'indépendance nationale decided to become a political party.

== See also ==
- Politics of Quebec
- List of Quebec general elections
- List of Quebec premiers
- List of Quebec leaders of the Opposition
- National Assembly of Quebec
- Timeline of Quebec history
- Political parties in Quebec
- Sovereigntist events and strategies
- Quebec nationalism
- Quebec Sovereignism
