= Gilles Grégoire =

Canadian politician

Official 1966 portrait

Gilles Grégoire (May 6, 1926 – November 22, 2006) was a co-founder of the Parti Québécois.

Born in Quebec City, Quebec, the son of Joseph-Ernest Grégoire, he was elected in 1962 to the House of Commons of Canada with the Ralliement des créditistes. He left that party in 1966 and was elected president of the Ralliement national, a pro-sovereignty party on August 21, 1966.

In October 1968 the Ralliement national merged with René Lévesque's Mouvement Souveraineté-Association to form the Parti Québécois.

He was elected as a member of the National Assembly of Quebec in the riding of Frontenac in the 1976 general election and was re-elected in the 1981 general election. In 1983, he was sentenced to two years minus a day in jail due to his sexual abuse of several minor girls, which resulted in him becoming an independent for the rest of his term.

He died in Quebec City at 80.

== See also ==
- Politics of Quebec
- List of Quebec general elections
- List of Quebec leaders of the Opposition
- History of the Quebec sovereigntist movement
