= Ralliement national =

National Rally Ralliement national
- Abbreviation: RN
- President: Gilles Grégoire
- Founder: René Jutras; Laurent Legault
- Founded: 13 March 1966
- Dissolved: 14 October 1968
- Split from: Rassemblement pour l'Indépendance Nationale
- Merged into: Parti Québécois
- Ideology: Quebec separatism Right-wing populism Conservatism
- Political position: Right-wing

Ralliement national (RN; English: National Rally) was a separatist and right-wing populist provincial political party that advocated the political independence of Quebec from Canada in the 1960s.

The party was led by former créditiste Gilles Grégoire. Unlike the Rassemblement pour l'indépendance nationale led by Pierre Bourgault, a left-wing party, the Ralliement national was more right of centre on the political spectrum.

The Ralliement national was formed in 1966 following a merger between the Regroupement national (a dissident wing of Bourgault's RIN) and a pro-independence group that broke away from the Ralliement des créditistes in 1965.

In the 1966 Quebec general election, the Ralliement national and the Rassemblement pour l'indépendance nationale won about 8.8% of the popular vote and no seats.

In 1968, the Ralliement national agreed to merge with René Lévesque's Mouvement souveraineté-association to form the Parti Québécois under Lévesque's leadership.

After that, Pierre Bourgault disbanded the RIN and invited its members to join the new PQ. At that point, sovereigntist forces in Quebec were united, and three elections later, the PQ won the 1976 Quebec general election.

== Election results ==
General election	# of candidates	# of seats won	% of popular vote
1966	90	0	3.21%

== See also ==
- Politics of Quebec
- List of Quebec general elections
- List of Quebec premiers
- List of Quebec leaders of the Opposition
- National Assembly of Quebec
- Timeline of Quebec history
- Political parties in Quebec
- Secessionist movements of Canada
