= Il me reste un pays =

Song written by Gilles Vigneault

"Il me reste un pays" ("There is still a country for me") is a song written by Gilles Vigneault, a Quebec francophone, and Gaston Rochon.
