= Jules-Paul Tardivel =

American–Canadian author (1851–1905)

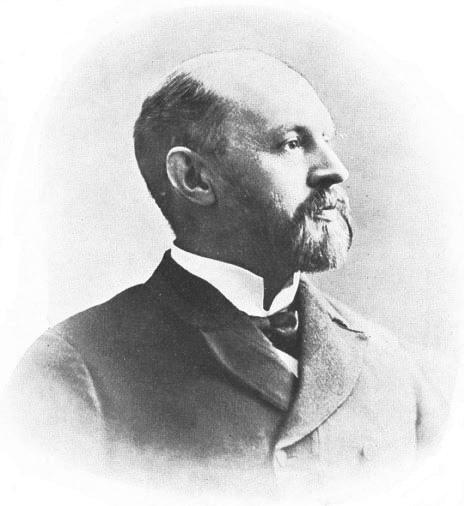
Jules-Paul Tardivel

Jules-Paul Tardivel (2 September 1851 – 24 April 1905) was an American–Canadian writer and a promoter of Quebec nationalism.

Tardivel was born in Covington, Kentucky, and sent to Saint-Hyacinthe, Quebec, for his classical education in the French language. Despite learning French only in his late teens, he became a tireless promoter of French Quebec and detractor of anglicisms.

In July 1874, Tardivel began work in Quebec City on Le Canadien, another paper dedicated to the interests of the Conservative Party. In the 1880s, he founded La Verité, a weekly newspaper extolling his religious, political and social beliefs. Perennial topics included conspiracy theories (typically aimed at Freemasons, socialists, communists, freethinkers, or any combination thereof), conservative Roman Catholic dogma, the domination of Quebec by English Canada, and the subversive effects of the Boy Scout movement. It survived his death, under the editorship of his son, until it ceased publication circa 1920.

In the 1890s, he wrote a futuristic roman à clef about Canadian politics called Pour la Patrie (translated into English the 1970s as For My Country). In it, he accused John A. Macdonald, the first Prime Minister of Canada, of being a Freemason who conspired with the devil to oppress Quebec and to crush the French language.

== See also ==
- Literature of Quebec
- Culture of Quebec
- List of Quebec authors
