= Francœur Motion =

Motion in the Quebec Legislative Assembly

The Francœur Motion, introduced in the Legislative Assembly of Quebec in 1918 by Liberal MLA Joseph-Napoléon Francœur, declared that Quebec would be prepared to leave the Canadian federation if English Canadians felt the presence of Quebec was "an obstacle to the union, progress and development of Canada".

Que cette Chambre est d’avis que la Province de Québec serait disposée à accepter la rupture du pacte confédératif, si dans les autres provinces, on croit qu’elle est un obstacle à l’union, au progrès et au développement du Canada.

(That this House is of the opinion that the Province of Quebec would be prepared to accept the break-up of the Confederation Pact if, in the other provinces, it is believed to be an obstacle to the union, progress and development of Canada.)

Francœur's motion was a response to the harsh reaction in English Canada to Quebec's strong anti-conscription feelings during the Conscription Crisis of 1917 of the First World War. Many Quebecers opposed conscription because of anti-imperialist sentiments. The motion attracted widespread attention in the press and was notably approved by the newspaper Le Canada. Premier of Quebec Lomer Gouin finally convinced Francœur to withdraw the motion because he did not wish to see a vote taken on it.

== See also ==
- Quebec independence movement
- Politics of Quebec
- History of Quebec
