= Collège Stanislas (Quebec) =

School in Quebec, Canada

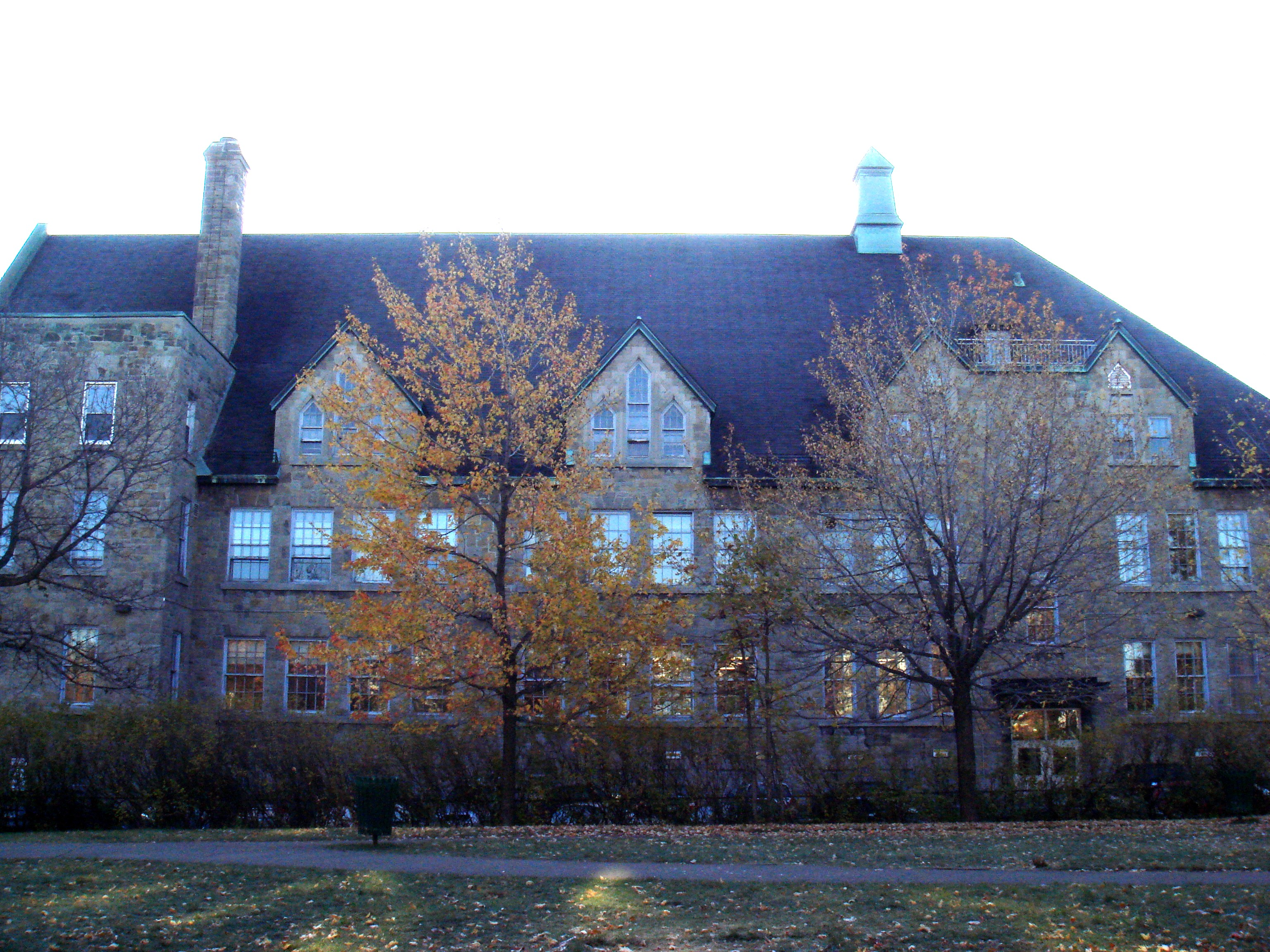
- Sainte-Foy and Outremont, Quebec; Canada

Information
- Type: private Kindergarten through college
- Established: 1938
- Campus: Urban
- Colours: Blue & red
- Nickname: Chevaliers
- Affiliations: ACCC, CCAA, AEFE
- Website: www.stanislas.qc.ca

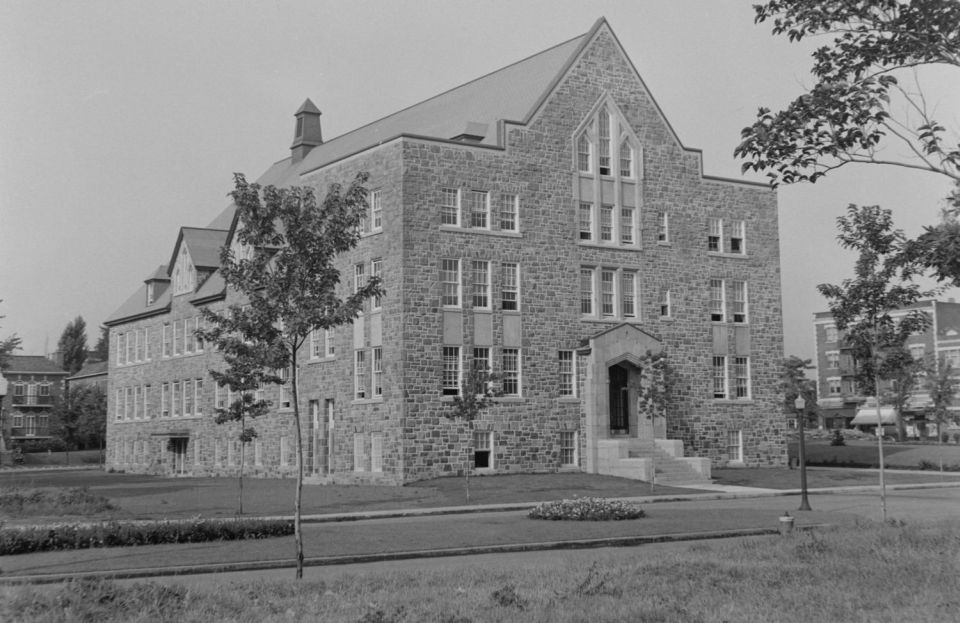
Collège Stanislas in Outremont in 1942

Collège Stanislas in Sainte-Foy and Collège Stanislas de Montréal (FR) Outremont, Quebec are two campuses of an exclusive French language private education institution for boys and girls aged 4 to 18 years which is accredited by the Agency for French Education Abroad (part of the Ministry of Education of France).

== History ==
The school was founded in 1938 by Raoul Dandurand and other wealthy French Canadians as a Roman Catholic subsidiary of the renowned Collège Stanislas de Paris in Paris, France. Architect Jean Julien Perrault designed the campus on Dollard Boulevard in Outremont in 1941. The second location in Ste.-Foy opened in 1989.

== Programs ==
The college offers the equivalent of a provincial Secondary School Graduation Diploma (DES), Diploma of Collegial Studies (DEC), and the French Baccalaureate. The college offers three pre-university programs. These pre-university programs, which take two years to complete, cover the subject matters which roughly correspond to the additional year of high school given elsewhere in Canada in preparation for a chosen field in university.

== Campuses ==
- 1605 chemin Ste-Foy, Québec City
- 780 boulevard Dollard, Outremont

== Notable alumni ==
- Jacques Parizeau, former Premier of Quebec
- Philippe Couillard, former Premier of Quebec
- Anthony Duclair, professional hockey player
- Raymond Bachand, Quebec Minister of Economic Development, Innovation and Export Trade
- Jerome Choquette, lawyer and politician
- André D'Allemagne, teacher, political commentator, essayist
- Sébastien Dhavernas, actor and politician
- Alain Dubuc, journalist and economist
- Charles Gonthier, former Justice of the Supreme Court of Canada
- Cleo Paskal, geopolitical analyst and author
- Michel Brault, filmmaker
- Claude Jutra, filmmaker
- Patrick Gemayel, member of Chromeo
- David Macklovitch, member of Chromeo
- fr: Antoine de Vial, priest, poet and essayist also as Vim Karénine
- Jean-Louis Baudouin, lawyer and Officer of the Order of Canada
- Anaïs Barbeau-Lavalette, actress, film director, and screenwriter
- Joseph Facal, politician
- fr: Claude Poissant, actor
- Claude Poissant, economist and journalist
- Jacques-Yvan Morin, lawyer and politician
- Charles Binamé, filmmaker
- fr: Nicolas Duvernois, entrepreneur, Pur Vodka
- Rami Atallah, CEO & Founder of SSENSE

== See also ==
- Higher education in Quebec
- List of colleges in Quebec
