= André D'Allemagne =

André d'Allemagne
- Born: October 14, 1929; Montreal, Quebec
- Died: February 1, 2001 (aged 71)
- Education: Master's degree in linguistics, Master's degree in political science
- Occupations: translator, political science professor

André d'Allemagne (October 14, 1929 – February 1, 2001) was a translator, political science teacher, essayist and a militant for the independence of Quebec from Canada. Along with some 20 other people including Marcel Chaput and Jacques Bellemare, he was a founding member of the Rassemblement pour l'indépendance nationale (RIN).

== Biography ==
André d'Allemagne was born in Montreal on October 14, 1929. His father was Pierre D'Allemagne and his mother Marie-Hélène Stella Hamelin. His paternal grandfather was baron André d'Allemagne (1865–1960), mayor of the Belley commune, in the French département of Ain.

He completed his classical studies at Collège Stanislas de Montréal between 1940 and 1948. He began studies in linguistics first at McGill University, then later at Université de Montréal, where in 1952 he obtained a master's degree for a thesis entitled Antagonismes linguistiques chez le bilingue.

After obtaining his master's degree, he practised the work of translator for the debates division of the Canadian federal Parliament. Between 1954 and 1964, he also worked as a creative writer and translator for The Canadian Press and various advertising agencies in Montreal and Toronto. In January 1958, he took part in the first simultaneous translation experiment on CBC/Société Radio-Canada. With Andrée Francœur and Blake T. Hanna, two other graduated of Université de Montréal, he interpreted the speeches of speakers for the Congress of the federal Liberal Party of Canada held in Ottawa.

In March 1958, the Alliance laurentienne's review Laurentie published a letter he sent to the editors. In what is maybe his first political opinion text in favour of the independence of Quebec, he asserted that the centralizing policy of Ottawa since World War II threatened Quebec's survival and that the autonomist action was globally a failure on top of being insufficient. According to him, the Laurentian State was not only possible, but necessary and urgent. He concluded his text by inviting the partisans of independence not to take position too quickly on the kind of political regime that a "free and renovated Québec" would assume. Whether socialist, capitalist or corporatist, he said, that State will never materialize if the pro-independence militants fail to achieve unity beyond their opinions on matters of political organization, social doctrines and religious beliefs. Also in March 1958, the McGill Daily, student paper of McGill University, published one of his texts in a special issue entitled "French Canada Today". In this text he summarized the history of French Canadians for his English-speaking public on the basis of his own readings of historians Mason Wade, Thomas B. Costain and Michel Brunet.

On September 10, 1960, he took part with 20 other people to the foundation of the Rassemblement pour l'indépendance nationale (RIN) which took place at the Auberge Le Châtelet in Morin Heights in the Laurentides. He was elected president of the new organization. The idea that the RIN had to strive to unite French Canadians on the question of national independence beyond political divergences, an idea also shared by vice-president Marcel Chaput, was at the heart of the new organization's action in its early years.

In 1964, the Association générale des étudiants de l'Université de Montréal (AGÉUM) appointed him technical councillor. He appears as himself in Denis Héroux's movie Over My Head (Jusqu'au cou), released in December of that year.

The RIN, turned into a social democrat political party in 1964, presented him for candidate in the Outremont electoral district during the Quebec general election of June 5, 1966. He came in second behind Jérôme Choquette of the Parti libéral du Québec with 3,218 votes (12.67%). His essay Le colonialisme au Québec was published that year.

After the dissolution of the RIN in 1968, he became a member of the Parti Québécois. From 1969, he was teaching political sciences at Collège de Maisonneuve and retired from active politics.

In 1971, the political science faculty of Université de Montréal granted him a master's degree for his thesis Le Rassemblement pour l'indépendance nationale de 1960–1963, étude d'un groupe de pression au Québec. His thesis was published in 1974 with a preface by sociologist Marcel Rioux.

He married journalist Lysiane Gagnon. He had three children with Viviane Racette, his second wife: Nicolas (1976), Catherine (1978) and Anne (1981).

In 1978, he started working on a doctoral thesis of political science under the advisorship of Edmond Orban, professor at Université de Montréal. He abandoned his nearly-complete thesis "for personal and confidential reasons" in May 1980.

He died on February 1, 2001, at the age of 71 years, after suffering from cancer for three years. An adieu ceremony organized by his family was held at the Société Saint-Jean-Baptiste de Montréal's Maison Ludger-Duvernay on February 6.

In 2002, Jean-Claude Labrecque directed a historical documentary on the RIN in which one can see archive footage of André D'Allemagne as well as the last interview he gave for the camera.

== Publications ==
Essays

- Le Colonialisme au Québec (1966)
- La Capitulation tranquille. Les «multinationales», pouvoir politique parallèle? (1972)
- Le R.I.N. de 1960 à 1963. Étude d'un groupe de pression au Québec (1974)
- Le presque pays (1998)
- Une idée qui somnolait : écrits sur la souveraineté du Québec depuis les origines du RIN, 1958-2000 (2000)

Translations

- Stanley Bréhaut Ryerson, Le Capitalisme et la Confédération. Aux sources du conflit Canada-Québec (1760-1873) (1972)
- Kari Levitt, La capitulation tranquille (1972)
- Brian Young, George-Étienne Cartier, bourgeois montréalais (1982)
- Rae Murphy, Robert Chodos, Nick Auf Der Maur, Brian Mulroney (1984)
- Crawford Brough Macpherson, Principes et limites de la démocratie libérale (1985)

Thesis

- Antagonismes linguistiques chez le bilingue (1952)
- Le Rassemblement pour l'indépendance nationale de 1960-1963, étude d'un groupe de pression au Québec (1971)
