= Alliance laurentienne =

The Alliance Laurentienne was a political organization founded by Raymond Barbeau on January 25, 1957. It was an early organization of the contemporary independence movement of Quebec but, unlike the majority of those to come, it adopted somewhat right-wing, even corporatist politics. It was also attached to the Catholic faith, as opposed to the secularism of most future sovereigntist groups. Its manifesto is however a proponent of love between peoples and ethnicities.

Its vision of a "Free Quebec" was called "Laurentie" (thus the name of the movement), a name given to the territory of Quebec by Wilfrid Morin in 1938. And from 1957 to 1962, it published a magazine under that title. The independence intellectual André D'Allemagne was one of its members before, frustrated with its right-wing tendencies, he left to create the Rassemblement pour l'indépendance nationale (RIN). The RIN, officially neutral on the left-right spectrum, had many militants with beliefs ranging from socialism to social democracy.

The 2020s, Nouvelle Alliance has been reported to have been inspired by the Alliance laurentienne.

== See also ==
- Quebec sovereignty movement
- Quebec nationalism
- Politics of Quebec
