= Raymond Barbeau =

- Born: June 27, 1930
- Died: March 5, 1992 (aged 61)
- Occupations: teacher, essayist, literary critic, militant of the independence of Quebec, naturopath

Raymond Barbeau (June 27, 1930 – March 5, 1992) was a teacher, essayist, literary critic, political figure and naturopath. He was one of the early militants of the contemporary independence movement of Quebec.

Barbeau was born in Montreal in 1930 and earned in 1955 a doctorate from the Université de Paris (La Sorbonne). In 1957, he founded the Alliance laurentienne, one of the first 20th century organizations in favour of an independent Quebec republic, and founded its official organ called Laurentie. He created the movement Les fils du Québec (French for "The Sons of Quebec") in 1970.

He died in Montreal in 1992.

== Bibliography ==
- J'ai choisi l'indépendance (1961)
- Le Québec est-il une colonie ? (1962)
- La libération économique du Québec (1963)
- Le Québec bientôt unilingue? (1965)
- Oui au référendum. Procès de la Confédération (1977)
- Le Québec souverain, un pays normal (1978)

== See also ==
- Quebec sovereignty movement
- Quebec nationalism
- Politics of Quebec
