= Quebec sovereignty movement =

Independence movement in Canada

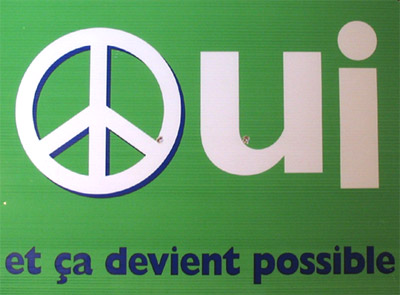
A poster for Quebec sovereignty during the 1995 referendum: Oui, et ça devient possible (French for 'Yes, and it becomes possible').

Location, in dark blue, of Quebec within North America.

The Quebec sovereignty movement (French: mouvement souverainiste du Québec, Quebec pronunciation: [muvmã suvʁɛnɪst d͡zy kebɛk]) is a political movement advocating for Quebec's independence from Canada. Proponents argue that Quebecers form a distinct nation with a unique culture, language, history, and set of values, and thus should exercise their right to self-determination. This principle includes the possibility of choosing between integration with a third state, political association with another state, or full independence, enabling Quebecers to establish a sovereign state with its own constitution.

Supporters believe that an independent Quebec would be better positioned to promote its economic, social, environmental, and cultural development. They contend that self-governance would allow Quebec to manage its resources, such as its vast renewable natural assets and strategic geographic location, in alignment with its interests. Additionally, sovereignty would enable Quebec to establish its own fiscal policies, participate directly in international forums, and uphold its commitment to the French language and intercultural integration model.

The movement is rooted in Quebec nationalism, emphasizing the province's distinct identity and its desire for political autonomy to achieve its full potential as a sovereign nation.

== Overview ==
The goal of Quebec's sovereignist movement is to make Quebec an independent state. In practice, the terms independentist, sovereignist, and separatist are used to describe people adhering to this movement, although the latter term is perceived as pejorative by those concerned as it de-emphasizes that the sovereignty project aims to achieve political independence without severing economic connections with Canada. Most of the prime ministers of Canada's speeches use the term sovereignist in French to moderate remarks made on the Quebec electorate. In English, the term separatist is often used to accentuate negative dimensions of the movement.

The idea of Quebec sovereignty is based on a nationalist vision and interpretation of historical facts and sociological realities in Quebec, which attest to the existence of a Québécois people and a Quebec nation. On November 27, 2006, the House of Commons of Canada adopted, by 266 votes to 16, a motion recognizing that "Québécois form a nation within a united Canada". On November 30, the National Assembly of Quebec unanimously adopted a motion recognizing "the positive character" of the motion adopted by Ottawa and proclaiming that said motion did not diminish "the inalienable rights, the constitutional powers and the privileges of the 'National Assembly and of the Quebec nation'".

Sovereignists believe that the natural final outcome of the Québécois people's collective adventure and development is the achievement of political independence, which is only possible if Quebec becomes a sovereign state and if its inhabitants not only govern themselves through independent democratic political institutions, but are also free to establish external relations and make international treaties without the federal government of Canada being involved.

Through parliamentarism, Québécois currently possess a certain democratic control over the Quebec state. However, within the Canadian federation, Quebec does not have all the constitutional powers that would allow it to act as a true national government. Furthermore, the policies pursued by Quebec and those pursued by the federal government often come into conflict. Various attempts to reform the Canadian federal system have failed (most notably the defunct Meech Lake and Charlottetown Accords), due to conflicting interests between the sovereignist and federalist elites of Quebec, as well as with English Canada (see Constitutional Debate in Canada).

Although Quebec's independence movement is a political movement, cultural and social concerns that are much older than the sovereignist movement, as well as Quebecers' national identity, are also at the base for the desire to emancipate Quebec's population. One of the main cultural arguments sovereigntists cite is that if Quebec were independent, Québécois would have a national citizenship, which would solve the problem of Québécois cultural identity in the North American context (ex. who is a Québécois and who is not, what is uniquely Québécois, etc.). Another example is that by establishing an independent Quebec, sovereigntists believe that the culture of Québécois and their collective memory will be adequately protected, in particular against cultural appropriation by other nations, such as the incident with Canada's national anthem, originally a French Canadian patriotic song appropriated by the anglophone majority of Canada. Adherents also believe an independent Quebec would also adequately and definitively resolve the issue of needing to protect the French language in Quebec; French is the language of the majority in Quebec, but since it is the language of a cultural minority in Canada – and since Quebec does not have the legislative powers of an independent state – French is still considered threatened by many Quebecers (see Language demographics of Quebec, OQLF, and Charter of the French Language).

== History ==
=== Before the 1960s ===
Sovereignty and sovereignism are terms derived from the modern independence movement, which started during the Quiet Revolution of the 1960s. However, the roots of Quebecers' desire for political autonomy are much older than that.

Francophone nationalism in North America dates back to 1534, the year Jacques Cartier landed in the Gespe'gewa'gi district of Miꞌkmaꞌki claiming Canada for France, and more particularly to 1608, the year of the founding of Quebec City by Samuel de Champlain, the first permanent settlement for French colonists and their descendants in New France (who were called Canadiens, Canayens or Habitants). Following the British conquest of New France, the Canadien movement, which lasted from 1760 to the late 18th century and sought to restore the traditional rights of French Canadians began. During this period, French Canadians began to express an indigenous form of nationalism which emphasized their longstanding residence in North America. The period was briefly interrupted by the Quebec Act of 1774, which granted certain rights to Canadiens but did not truly satisfy them, and was notably exacerbated by the 1783 Treaty of Paris, which ceded parts of the Quebec to the United States, and the Constitutional Act of 1791, which established the Westminster system.

The Patriote movement was the period lasting from the beginning of the 19th century to the defeat of the Patriotes at the Battle of Saint-Eustache in 1837, the final battle in the Patriotes War. It began with the founding of the Parti Canadien by the Canadiens. It stands out for its notorious resistance to the influence of the Château Clique, a group of wealthy families in Lower Canada in the early 19th century who were the Lower Canadian equivalent of the Family Compact in Upper Canada.

The perfidious plans of the British authorities have broken all ties of sympathy with a motherland which shows itself to be insensitive. A separation has begun between parties whose union it will never be possible to cement again, but which will continue with increasing vigor, until an unexpected and unforeseen event, as we are offered from time to time in the course of the present times, provides us with a favorable opportunity to take our place among the independent sovereignties of America. We missed two great opportunities: let's all be prepared for a third. – 1837 Address of the Sons of Liberty

La Survivance is the period beginning after the defeat of the Patriotes in the rebellions of 1837–1838 and lasting until the Quiet Revolution. It concerns the survival strategies employment by the French-Canadian nation and the ultramontane of the Catholic Church following the enactment of the Act of Union of 1840 which established a system whose goal was to force the cultural and linguistic assimilation of French Canadians into English-Canadian culture. In addition to la Revanche des berceaux, a phlegmatic character was adopted in response to the mass immigration of English-speaking immigrants. Some French Canadians left Quebec during this period in search of job security and protection of their culture. This phenomenon, known as the Grande Hémorragie (French for 'great bleeding'), is the origin of the Quebec diaspora in New England and Northeastern Ontario among other places. It led to the creation of permanent resistance movements in those new locations. Groups of nationalists outside Quebec have since then promoted Quebec's cultural identity, along with that of the Acadians in the Maritime provinces and in Louisiana, represented by the Société Nationale de l'Acadie since 1881. Louis-Alexandre Taschereau coming to power in 1920 created an upheaval in French-Canadian society for most of the interwar period. The confrontations and divergence of political opinions led to the rise of a new form of nationalism, called clerico-nationalism, promoted by Maurice Duplessis and the Union Nationale party during the Grande Noirceur of 1944 to 1959.

During the Quiet Revolution of the 1960s to 1970s, the modern Québécois sovereignist movement took off, with René Lévesque as one of its most recognizable figures. Various strategies were implemented since its rise, and it constitutes a continuity in French-speaking nationalism in North America. Now the patriotism is Quebec-focused, and the identifier has been changed from French-Canadian nationalism or identity to Québécois nationalism or identity.

=== Quiet Revolution (1960s–1970s) ===
The Quiet Revolution in Quebec brought widespread change in the 1960s. Among other changes, support for Quebec independence began to form and grow in some circles. The first organization dedicated to the independence of Quebec was the Alliance Laurentienne, founded by Raymond Barbeau on January 25, 1957.

A primary change was an effort by the provincial government to assume greater control over healthcare and education, both of which had previously been under the purview of the Catholic Church. To achieve this, the government established ministries of Health and Education, expanded the public service, made substantial investments in the public education system, and permitted the unionization of the civil service. Additionally, measures were taken to enhance Quebecois control over the province's economy, including the nationalization of electricity production and distribution, the creation of the Canada/Quebec Pension Plan, and the establishment of Hydro-Québec in an effort to nationalize Quebec's electric utilities. Furthermore, during this period, French Canadians in Quebec adopted the term Québécois to distinguish themselves from both the rest of Canada and France, solidifying their identity as a reformed province.

On September 10, 1960, the Rassemblement pour l'indépendance nationale (RIN) was founded, with Pierre Bourgault quickly becoming its leader. On August 9 of the same year, the Action socialiste pour l'indépendance du Québec (ASIQ) was formed by Raoul Roy. The "independence + socialism" project of the ASIQ was a source of political ideas for the Front de libération du Québec (FLQ).

On October 31, 1962, the Comité de libération nationale and, in November of the same year, the Réseau de résistance were set up. These two groups were formed by RIN members to organize non-violent but illegal actions, such as vandalism and civil disobedience. The most extremist individuals of these groups left to form the FLQ, which, unlike all the other groups, had made the decision to resort to violence in order to reach its goal of independence for Quebec. Shortly after the November 14, 1962, Quebec general election, RIN member Marcel Chaput founded the short-lived Parti républicain du Québec.

In February 1963, the Front de libération du Québec (FLQ) was founded by three Rassemblement pour l'indépendance nationale members who had met each other as part of the Réseau de résistance. They were Georges Schoeters, Raymond Villeneuve, and Gabriel Hudon.

In 1964, the RIN became a provincial political party. In 1965, the more conservative Ralliement national (RN) also became a party.

During this period, the Estates General of French Canada are organized. The stated objective of these Estates General was to consult the French-Canadian people on their constitutional future.

The historical context of the time was a period when many former European colonies were becoming independent. Some advocates of Quebec independence saw Quebec's situation in a similar light; numerous activists were influenced by the writings of Frantz Fanon, Albert Memmi, and Karl Marx.

In June 1967, French president Charles de Gaulle, who had recently granted independence to Algeria, shouted "Vive le Québec libre !" during a speech from the balcony of Montreal's city hall during a state visit to Canada. In doing so, he deeply offended the federal government, and English Canadians felt he had demonstrated contempt for the sacrifice of Canadian soldiers who died on the battlefields of France in two world wars. The visit was cut short and de Gaulle left the country.

Finally, in October 1967, former Liberal cabinet minister René Lévesque left that party when it refused to discuss sovereignty at a party convention. Lévesque formed the Mouvement souveraineté-association and set about uniting pro-sovereignty forces.

He achieved that goal in October 1968 when the MSA held its only national congress in Quebec City. The RN and MSA agreed to merge to form the Parti Québécois (PQ), and later that month Pierre Bourgault, leader of the RIN, dissolved his party and invited its members to join the PQ.

Meanwhile, in 1969 the FLQ stepped up its campaign of violence, which would culminate in what would become known as the October Crisis. The group claimed responsibility for the bombing of the Montreal Stock Exchange, and in 1970 the FLQ kidnapped British Trade Commissioner James Cross and Quebec Labour Minister Pierre Laporte; Laporte was later found murdered.

Jacques Parizeau joined the Parti Québécois on September 19, 1969, and Jérôme Proulx of the Union Nationale joined on November 11 of the same year.

In the 1970 provincial election, the PQ won its first seven seats in the National Assembly. René Lévesque was defeated in Mont-Royal by the Liberal André Marchand.

Though the improvements made to Quebec society during this era make it seem like an extremely innovative period, it has been posited that these changes follow a logical revolutionary movement occurring throughout the Western world in the 1960s. Quebec historian Jacques Rouillard took this revisionist stance in arguing that the Quiet Revolution may have accelerated the natural evolution of Quebec's francophone society rather than having turned it on its head.

The revisionist argument that describes this period as a natural continuation of innovations already occurring in Quebec cannot be omitted from any discussion on the merits of the Quiet Revolution. Though criticized as apologists for Duplessis, Robert Rumilly and Conrad Black did add complexity to the narrative of neo-nationalists by contesting the concept of a Grande Noirceur, the idea that Duplessis's tenure in office was one of reactionary policies and politics. Dale Thomson, for his part, noted that Jean Lesage, far from seeking to dismantle the traditional order, negotiated a transition with (and sought to accommodate) Quebec's Catholic Church. Several scholars have lately sought to mediate the neo-nationalist and revisionist schools by looking at grassroots Catholic activism and the Church's involvement in policy-making.

Montreal municipal politics were also going through an important upheaval. Jean Drapeau became Montreal mayor on October 24, 1960. Under Drapeau, Montreal was awarded the 1967 International and Universal Exposition (Expo 67), whose construction he oversaw.

=== The referendum of 1980 ===
In the 1976 election, the PQ won 71 seats — a majority in the National Assembly. With voting turnouts high, 41.4 percent of the electorate voted for the PQ. Prior to the election, the PQ renounced its intention to implement sovereignty-association if it won power.

On August 26, 1977, the PQ passed two main laws: first, the law on the financing of political parties, which prohibits contributions by corporations and unions and set a limit on individual donations, and second, the Charter of the French Language.

On May 17 PQ Member of the National Assembly Robert Burns resigned, telling the press he was convinced that the PQ was going to lose its referendum and fail to be re-elected afterwards.

At its seventh national convention from June 1 to 3, 1979, the sovereignist adopted their strategy for the coming referendum. The PQ then began an aggressive effort to promote sovereignty-association by providing details of how the economic relations with the rest of Canada would include free trade between Canada and Quebec, common tariffs against imports, and a common currency. In addition, joint political institutions would be established to administer these economic arrangements.

Sovereignty-association was proposed to the population of Quebec in the 1980 Quebec referendum. The proposal was rejected by 60 percent of the Quebec electorate.

In September, the PQ created a national committee of Anglophones and a liaison committee with ethnic minorities.

The PQ was returned to power in the 1981 election with a stronger majority than in 1976, obtaining 49.2 percent of the vote and winning 80 seats. However, they did not hold a referendum in their second term, and put sovereignty on hold, concentrating on their stated goal of "good government".

René Lévesque retired in 1985 (and died in 1987). In the 1985 election under his successor Pierre-Marc Johnson, the PQ was defeated by the Liberal Party.

==== Sovereignty-association ====
The history of the relations between French-Canadians and English-Canadians in Canada has been marked by periods of tension. After colonizing Canada from 1608 onward, France lost the colony to Great Britain at the conclusion of the Seven Years' War in 1763, in which France ceded control of New France (except for the two small islands of Saint Pierre and Miquelon) to Great Britain, which returned the French West Indian islands they had captured in the 1763 Treaty of Paris.

Over the next century, French Canadians were supplanted by waves of Anglophone immigrants, notably outside of Quebec (where they became a minority) but within the province as well, as much of the province's economy was dominated by English-Canadians. The cause of Québécois nationalism, which waxed and waned over two centuries, gained prominence from the 1960s onward. The use of the word "sovereignty" and many of the ideas of this movement originated in the 1967 Mouvement Souveraineté-Association of René Lévesque. This movement ultimately gave birth to the Parti Québécois in 1968.

Sovereignty-association (French: souveraineté-association) is the combination of two concepts:

1. The achievement of sovereignty for the Quebec state.
2. The creation of a political and economic association between this new independent state and Canada.

It was first presented in Lévesque's political manifesto, Option Québec.

The Parti Québécois defines sovereignty as the power for a state to levy all its taxes, vote on all its laws, and sign all its treaties (as mentioned in the 1980 referendum question).

The type of association between an independent Quebec and the rest of Canada was described as a monetary and customs union as well as joint political institutions to administer the relations between the two countries. The main inspiration for this project was the then-emerging European Community. In Option Québec Lévesque expressly identified the EC as his model for forming a new relationship between sovereign Quebec and the rest of Canada, one that would loosen the political ties while preserving the economic links. The analogy, however, is counterproductive, suggesting Lévesque did not understand the nature and purpose of the European Community nor the relationship between economics and politics that continue to underpin it. Advocates of European integration had, from the outset, seen political union as a desirable and natural consequence of economic integration.

The hyphen between the words "sovereignty" and "association" was often stressed by Lévesque and other PQ members, to make it clear that both were inseparable. The reason stated was that if Canada decided to boycott Quebec exports after voting for independence, the new country would have to go through difficult economic times, as the barriers to trade between Canada and the United States were then very high. Quebec would have been a nation of 7 million people stuck between two impenetrable protectionist countries. In the event of having to compete against Quebec, rather than support it, Canada could easily maintain its well-established links with the United States to prosper in foreign trade.

Sovereignty-association as originally proposed would have meant that Quebec would become a politically independent state, but would maintain a formal association with Canada — especially regarding economic affairs. It was part of the 1976 sovereignist platform which swept the Parti Québécois into power in that year's provincial elections – and included a promise to hold a referendum on sovereignty-association. René Lévesque developed the idea of sovereignty-association to reduce the fear that an independent Quebec would face tough economic times. In fact, this proposal did result in an increase in support for a sovereign Quebec: polls at the time showed that people were more likely to support independence if Quebec maintained an economic partnership with Canada. This line of politics led the outspoken Yvon Deschamps to proclaim that what Quebecers want is an independent Quebec inside a strong Canada, thereby comparing the sovereignist movement to a spoiled child that has everything it could desire and still wants more.

In 1979 the PQ began an aggressive effort to promote sovereignty-association by providing details of how the economic relations with the rest of Canada would include free trade between Canada and Quebec, common tariffs against imports, and a common currency. In addition, joint political institutions would be established to administer these economic arrangements. But the sovereignist cause was hurt by the refusal of many politicians (most notably the premiers of several of the other provinces) to support the idea of negotiations with an independent Quebec, contributing to the Yes side losing by a vote of 60 percent to 40 percent.

This loss laid the groundwork for the 1995 referendum, which stated that Quebec should offer a new economic and political partnership to Canada before declaring independence. An English translation of part of the Sovereignty Bill reads, "We, the people of Quebec, declare it our own will to be in full possession of all the powers of a state; to levy all our taxes, to vote on all our laws, to sign all our treaties and to exercise the highest power of all, conceiving, and controlling, by ourselves, our fundamental law."

This time, the sovereignists lost in a very close vote: 50.6 percent to 49.4 percent, or only 53,498 votes out of more than 4,700,000 votes cast. However, after the vote many within the sovereignist camp were very upset that the vote broke down heavily along language lines. Approximately 90 percent of English speakers and allophones (mostly immigrants and first-generation Quebecers whose native language is neither French or English) Quebecers voted against the referendum, while almost 60 percent of Francophones voted Yes. Quebec premier Jacques Parizeau, whose government supported sovereignty, attributed the defeat of the resolution to "money and ethnic votes." His opinion caused an outcry among English-speaking Quebecers, and he resigned following the referendum.

An inquiry by the director-general of elections concluded in 2007 that at least $500,000 was spent by the federalist camp in violation of Quebec's election laws. This law imposes a limit on campaign spending by both option camps. Parizeau's statement was also an admission of failure by the Yes camp in getting the newly arrived Quebecers to adhere to their political option.

Accusations of an orchestrated effort of "election engineering" in several polling stations in areas with large numbers of non-francophone voters, which resulted in unusually large proportions of rejected ballots, were raised following the 1995 referendum. Afterward, testimony by PQ-appointed polling clerks indicated that they were ordered by PQ-appointed overseers to reject ballots in these polling stations for frivolous reasons that were not covered in the election laws.

While opponents of sovereignty were pleased with the defeat of the referendum, most recognized that there were still deep divides within Quebec and problems with the relationship between Quebec and the rest of the country.

=== The referendum of 1995 ===
The PQ returned to power in the 1994 election under Jacques Parizeau, this time with 44.75% of the popular vote. In the intervening years, the failures of the Meech Lake Accord and Charlottetown Accord had revived support for sovereignty, which had been written off as a dead issue for much of the 1980s.

Another consequence of the failure of the Meech Lake Accord was the formation of the Bloc Québécois (BQ), a sovereignist federal political party, under the leadership of the charismatic former Progressive Conservative federal cabinet minister Lucien Bouchard. Several PC and Liberal members of the federal parliament left their parties to form the BQ. For the first time, the PQ supported pro-sovereigntist forces running in federal elections; during his lifetime Lévesque had always opposed such a move.

The Union Populaire had nominated candidates in the 1979 and 1980 federal elections, and the Parti nationaliste du Québec had nominated candidates in the 1984 election, but neither of these parties enjoyed the official support of the PQ; nor did they enjoy significant public support among Quebecers.

In the 1993 federal election, which featured the collapse of Progressive Conservative Party support, the BQ won enough seats in Parliament to become Her Majesty's Loyal Opposition in the House of Commons.

At the Royal Commission on the Future of Quebec (also known as the Outaouais Commission) in 1995, the Marxist-Leninist Party of Canada made a presentation in which the party leader, Hardial Bains, recommended to the committee that Quebec declare itself as an independent republic.

1995 referendum results by constituency

Parizeau promptly advised the Lieutenant Governor to call a new referendum. The 1995 referendum question differed from the 1980 question in that the negotiation of an association with Canada was now optional. The open-ended wording of the question resulted in significant confusion, particularly amongst the "Yes" side, as to what exactly they were voting for. This was a primary motivator for the creation of the Clarity Act (see below).

The "No" campaign won, but only by a very small margin — 50.6% to 49.4%. As in the previous referendum, the English-speaking (anglophone) minority in Quebec overwhelmingly (about 90%) rejected sovereignty, support for sovereignty was also weak among allophones (native speakers of neither English nor French) in immigrant communities and first-generation descendants. The lowest support for the Yes side came from Mohawk, Cree, and Inuit voters in Quebec, some first Nations chiefs asserted their right to self-determination with the Cree being particularly vocal in their right to stay territories within Canada. More than 96% of the Inuit and Cree voted No in the referendum. However, The Innu, Attikamek, Algonquin and Abenaki nations did partially support Quebec sovereignty. In 1985, 59 percent of Quebec's Inuit population, 56 percent of the Attikamek population, and 49 percent of the Montagnais population voted in favour of the Sovereignist Parti Québécois party. That year, three out of every four native reservations gave a majority to the Parti Québécois party.

By contrast almost 60 percent of francophones of all origins voted "Yes". (82 percent of Quebecers are Francophone.) Later inquiries into irregularities determined that abuses had occurred on both sides: some argue that some "No" ballots had been rejected without valid reasons, and the October 27 "No" rally had evaded spending limitations because of out-of-province participation. An inquiry by the Director-General of Elections concluded in 2007 that the "No" camp had exceeded the campaign spending limits by $500,000.

=== The 1998 Quebec general election ===
Expecting Bouchard to announce another referendum if his party won the 1998 Quebec general election, the leaders of all other provinces and territories gathered for the Calgary Declaration in September 1997 to discuss how to oppose the sovereignty movement. Saskatchewan's Roy Romanow warned "It's two or three minutes to midnight". Bouchard did not accept his invitation; organizers did not invite Chrétien. Experts debated whether Quebec was a "distinct society" or "unique culture".

The Parti Québécois won re-election despite losing the popular vote to Jean Charest and the Quebec Liberals. In the number of seats won by both sides, the election was almost a clone of the previous 1994 election. However, public support for sovereignty remained too low for the PQ to consider holding a second referendum during their second term. Meanwhile, the federal government passed the Clarity Act to govern the wording of any future referendum questions and the conditions under which a vote for sovereignty would be recognized as legitimate. Federal Liberal politicians stated that the ambiguous wording of the 1995 referendum question was the primary impetus in the bill's drafting.

While opponents of sovereignty were pleased with their referendum victories, most recognized that there are still deep divides within Quebec and problems with the relationship between Quebec and the rest of Canada.

=== The Clarity Act ===
In 1999, the Parliament of Canada, at the urging of Prime Minister Jean Chrétien, passed the Clarity Act, a law that, amongst other things, set out the conditions under which the Crown-in-Council would recognize a vote by any province to leave Canada. It required a majority of eligible voters for a vote to trigger secession talks, not merely a plurality of votes. In addition, the act requires a clear question of secession to initiate secession talks. Controversially, the act gave the House of Commons the power to decide whether a proposed referendum question was considered clear, and allowed it to decide whether a clear majority has expressed itself in any referendum. It is widely considered by sovereignists as an illegitimate piece of legislation, who asserted that Quebec alone had the right to determine its terms of secession. Chrétien considered the legislation among his most significant accomplishments.

=== From 2000 to the present ===
"Sovereignty-Association" is nowadays more often referred to simply as "sovereignty". However, in the 1995 Quebec referendum, in which the sovereignty option was narrowly rejected, the notion of some form of economic association with the rest of Canada was still envisaged (continuing use of the Canadian dollar and military, for example) and was referred to as "sovereignty-partnership" (French: souveraineté-partenariat). It remains a part of the PQ program and is tied to national independence in the minds of most Quebecers. This part of the PQ program has always been controversial, especially since Canadian federal politicians usually refuse the concept.

In 2003, the PQ launched the Saison des idées ("Season of ideas") which was a public consultation aiming to gather the opinions of Quebecers on its sovereignty project. The program and the revised sovereignty project were adopted at the 2005 Congress.

In the 2003 election, the PQ lost power to the Liberal Party. However, in early 2004, the Liberal government of Paul Martin had proved to be unpopular, and that, combined with the federal Liberal Party sponsorship scandal, contributed to a resurgence of the BQ. In the 2004 federal elections, the Bloc Québécois won 54 of Quebec's 75 seats in the House of Commons, compared to 33 previously. However, in the 2006 federal elections the BQ lost three seats and in the 2008 federal elections lost two additional seats, bringing their total down to 49, but was still the most popular federal party in Quebec up until the 2011 Canadian federal election, when the BQ was devastated by the federalist NDP, with the Bloc at a total of four seats and the loss of official party status in the Commons (compared to the NDP's 59 seats, Conservatives' five seats, and the Liberals' seven seats in Quebec).

Polling data by Angus Reid in June 2009 showed the support for Quebec separation was weaker and separatism unlikely to occur in the near future. Polling data showed that 32% of Quebecers believed that Quebec had enough sovereignty and should remain part of Canada, 28% thought they should separate, and 30% say they believed that Quebec does need greater sovereignty but should remain part of Canada. However the poll revealed that a majority (79%) of Quebecers still desired more autonomy. The number one area of autonomy that those polled had hoped for was with regard to culture at 34%, the next highest areas were the economy at 32%, taxation at 26%, and immigration and the environment at 15% each.

The 2009 Angus Reid poll also revealed some effects of the Clarity Act in which they asked two questions, one a straightforward question for a separate nation, and the other a more muddled version on separation similar to the one posed in the 1995 referendum. The data on the questions revealed as follows to the first hard line question of "Do you believe that Quebec should become a country separate from Canada?" 34% replied yes, 54% said no, and 13% were unsure. To the less clear question of "Do you agree that Quebec should become sovereign after having made a formal offer to Canada for a new economic and political partnership within a scope of the bill respecting the future of Quebec?" support for separation increased to 40% yes, the no vote still led with 41%, and the unsure increased to 19%. The most startling revelation of the poll was that only 20% or 1 in 5 polled believed that Quebec would ever separate from Canada.

2011 was considered a watershed year for the sovereignist movement. In the aftermath of the 2011 federal election, Léger Marketing and pro-sovereignist newspaper Le Devoir conducted a poll on the question. When asked whether they would vote Yes or No in the event of a referendum, 41% of the respondents said they would vote Yes. In 2011, the sovereignist movement splintered, with several new parties being formed by disaffected politicians, with some politicians dissatisfied with slow progress towards independence, and others hoping to put the sovereignty question on the backburner. Leadership by PQ leader Pauline Marois was divisive.

During the 2015 federal election, the Bloc Québécois won 10 seats, in the 2019 election the BQ increased its number of seats from 10 in 2015, to 32 seats in 2019, both overtaking the NDP to become the third-largest caucus in the House of Commons and regaining official party status.

In the 2021 Canadian federal election, the BQ won 32 seats, unchanged from the prior election.

In 2021, François Legault's Coalition Avenir Québec government in Quebec proposed to amend the Charter of the French Language and the provincial constitution to more strongly entrench French as the sole official language. In response to this, the Bloc Québécois initiated a motion in the House of Commons endorsing the constitutionality of Legault's initiatives. The Commons passed the motion 281–2. There were 36 abstentions.

In the 2025 Canadian federal election, the BQ won 22 seats, a loss of 10 seats. It retained official party status, and its status as the third-largest caucus in the House of Commons.

The PQ returned to power in the 2026 election.

== Sovereignist and sympathetic organizations ==
=== Sovereignist political parties and parliamentary groups ===
- Bloc Québécois – federal political party
- Parti Québécois – provincial political party
- Québec solidaire – provincial political party
- Marxist–Leninist Party of Quebec – provincial political party

=== Sovereignist non-partisan organizations ===
Le Réseau Cap sur l'Indépendance (RCI) is a network composed of several member organisations, all of which are non-partisan. The RCI states that it seeks to promote and realize Quebec's independence. Its members are:

1. La Fondation Octobre 70
2. Les Aînés pour la souveraineté
3. Organisations unies pour l'indépendance du Québec (OUI Québec) – previously "Conseil de la souveraineté du Québec"
4. Jeunes Patriotes du Québec (JPQ)
5. Les Intellectuels pour la souveraineté (IPSO)
6. Mars 2011
7. Libre marcheur
8. Ligue d'action nationale
9. Mouvement des étudiants souverainistes de l'université de Montréal (MESUM)
10. Mouvement progressiste pour l'indépendance du Québec (MPIQ)
11. Rassemblement pour l'indépendance nationale (RIN)
12. Rassemblement pour un pays souverain (RPS)
13. Mouvement souverainiste du Québec (MSQ)
14. Réseau de Résistance du Québécois (RRQ)
15. Société nationales des Québécoises et Québécois des Laurentides
16. Société nationale Gaspésie—Îles-de-la-Madeleine
17. Saint-Jean-Baptiste Society of Montreal
18. Vigile (newspaper)
19. Comité indépendantiste du cégep du Vieux-Montréal
20. Comité souverainiste de l'UQÀM
21. Regroupement des mouvements indépendantistes collégiaux
22. Artistes volontaires
23. Nouveau Mouvement pour le Québec

=== Sympathetic organizations ===
- The labour unions of the:
  - Confédération des syndicats nationaux (Confederation of national labour unions)
  - Centrale des syndicats du Québec (Quebec labour unions congress)
  - Fédération des travailleurs et travailleuses du Québec (Federation of Quebec workers)
  - Union des artistes (Artists' Labour Union)
- The Mouvement national des Québécois et des Québécoises (MNQ) is a patriotic and non-partisan network of 19 societies. They have a stated mission of defending and promoting Quebecers' identity, as well as Quebec's language, history, culture and heritage. Its societies are:
1. SN de l'Est du Québec
2. SNQ du Saguenay—Lac-Saint-Jean
3. SNQ de la Capitale
4. SSJB de la Mauricie
5. SN de l'Estrie
6. SSJB de Montréal
7. SNQ de l'Outaouais
8. SNQ d'Abitibi-Témiscamingue et du Nord-du-Québec
9. SNQ de la Côte-Nord
10. SN Gaspésie-Îles-de-la-Madeleine
11. SNQ de Chaudière-Appalaches
12. SNQ de Laval
13. SNQ de Lanaudière
14. SNQ Région des Laurentides
15. SNQ des Hautes-Rivières
16. SNQ Richelieu—Saint-Laurent
17. SNQ du Suroît
18. SSJB Richelieu-Yamaska
19. SSJB du Centre-du-Québec
20. MNQ Headquarters

=== Sovereignist media ===
- Québecor
  - Journal de Montréal
  - Journal de Québec
  - Groupe TVA
- Le Devoir
- L'Action nationale
- L'aut'journal
- Le Couac
- Souverainete la solution
- La Gauche
- Le Mouton noir
- Le Québécois
- Québec-Radio
- Vigile

=== Past parties, organizations and media ===
- Rassemblement pour l'indépendance nationale (RIN) (1960–1968) – political movement
- Front de libération du Québec (FLQ) (1963–1971) – network of militant groups
- Parti nationaliste chrétien (PNC) (1967–1969) – religious provincial political party
- Le Jour (1974–1978) – newspaper
- Union Populaire (1979–1980) – federal political party
- Parti nationaliste du Québec (1983–1987) – federal political party
- Parti indépendantiste (1985–1990) – provincial political party
- Action démocratique du Québec (1994–2012) – this was a provincial political party that split off from the Quebec Liberal Party and ultimately merged into Coalition Avenir Québec. It was originally sovereigntist and later supported autonomy.
- Mouvement de libération nationale du Québec (1995–2000) – organisation which organized pro-independence protests and events
- SPQ Libre (2005–2010) – once a political club that operated from within the Parti Québécois
- Parti indépendantiste (2008–2018) – provincial political party
- Nouvelle Alliance Québec-Canada (2009–2011) – provincial political party
- Option nationale (2011–2018) – provincial political party which merged into Québec solidaire
- Québec debout (2018) – parliamentary group

== Opinion polls ==
View source data.

Date(s) conducted	Polling organisation/client	Sample size	Should Quebec be an independent country?			Lead
Date(s) conducted	Polling organisation/client	Sample size	Yes	No	Undecided	Lead
The Parti Québécois is elected in the 2026 Quebec general election (October 5, 2026)
15–18 May 2026	Léger	1027	32%	68%	–	36%
15 May 2026	Mainstreet Research	1225	23.1%	65.5%	11.4%	42.4%
17–20 April 2026	Léger	1030	35%	65%	–	30%
21–22 February 2026	Pallas	1075	32%	60%	8%	28%
2–6 February 2026	Angus Reid	939	27%	63%	10%	36%
1 February 2026	Innovative	651	35%	65%	–	30%
28 January 2026	Léger	1000	29%	62%	9%	33%
9–10 January 2026	Pallas	1128	35%	54%	11%	19%
1 December 2025	Léger	1042	37%	63%	–	26%
8–10 November 2025	Léger	1031	32%	68%	–	36%
18–20 October 2025	Léger	1047	35%	65%	–	30%
6–12 October 2025	HTML	1058	34%	52%	14%	18%
12–15 September 2025	Léger	1053	37%	63%	–	26%
5–6 September 2025	Pallas	1187	35%	55%	10%	20%
15–18 August 2025	Léger	977	32%	59%	9%	27%
July–August 2025	CROP	1000	41%	59%	–	18%
20–24 June 2025	Mainstreet	910	30%	59%	11%	29%
20–22 June 2025	Léger	1056	33%	59%	8%	26%
14–16 June 2025	Pallas	1085	32%	56%	12%	24%
16–18 May 2025	Léger Marketing	412	33%	59%	8%	26%
10–14 April 2025	Léger Marketing	1,001	40%	60%	–	20%
30 January – 2 February 2025	Léger Marketing	1,017	29%	59%	12%	30%
10–11 November 2024	Léger Marketing	1,010	37%	55%	8%	18%
23–25 August 2024	Léger Marketing	1,041	35%	56%	9%	21%
8 June 2024	Pallas	1,339	40%	52%	8%	12%
20–21 April 2024	Léger Marketing	1,026	36%	53%	11%	17%
16–18 March 2024	Léger Marketing	1,033	36%	53%	11%	17%
5–7 February 2024	Pallas	1,180	41%	48%	11%	7%
3–5 February 2024	Léger Marketing	1,040	35%	56%	9%	21%
4–6 December 2023	Léger Marketing	1,066	34%	55%	11%	21%
18–19 November 2023	Pallas	1,178	39%	48%	13%	9%
1 November 2023	Léger Marketing	1,066	35%	54%	11%	19%
27–28 September 2023	Pallas	1,095	37%	49%	14%	12%
20–21 August 2023	Léger Marketing	1,036	36%	53%	11%	17%
10–12 June 2023	Léger Marketing	1,042	37%	52%	11%	15%
24–26 February 2023	Léger Marketing/Le Devoir	1,000	38%	51%	10%	13%
The Coalition Avenir Québec (CAQ) is elected a 2nd term in the 2022 Quebec general election (October 3, 2022)
10 June 2022	Mainstreet Research	1,404	33%	67%	?	–
8–9 February 2021	Mainstreet Research	1,012	32%	56%	12%	24%
2–4 October 2020	Léger Marketing/Le Journal de Québec	1,013	36%	54%	10%	18%
The Coalition Avenir Québec (CAQ) is elected in the 2018 Quebec general election (October 1, 2018)
August 2018	Léger Marketing/Huffington Post	1,010	37%	63%	?	26%
29 April–2 May 2018	Ipsos	2,001	25%	55%	20%	30%
17–19 January 2017	Léger	1,005	35%	65%	?	30%
12–15 January 2017	CROP	1,000	33%	67%	?	34%
7–12 December 2016	CROP/	1,000	30%	70%	?	40%
7–10 November 2016	Léger Marketing	999	37%	63%	?	26%
12–15 May 2016	CROP/La Presse	1,000	35%	50%	15%	15%
11–15 February 2016	CROP/La Presse	1,005	37%	63%	?	26%
01–4 February 2016	Léger Marketing	1,005	32%	59%	9%	27%
November 2015	Léger Marketing	1,005	39%	61%	?	22%
17–20 September 2015	CROP	1,000	32%	57%	11%	25%
The Quebec Liberal Party is elected in the 2014 Quebec general election (April 7, 2014)
The Parti Québécois is elected in the 2012 Quebec general election (September 4, 2012)
9–11 May 2011	Léger Marketing/Le Devoir	1,000	32%	68%	?	36%
13–20 April 2011	CROP	1,000	36%	49%	14%	13%
23–25 May 2009	Léger Marketing	1,053	41%	59%	?	18%
The Quebec Liberal Party is elected in the 2008 Quebec general election (December 8, 2008)
4–5 December 2006	Léger Marketing	602	46%	54%	?	8%
20–24 April 2005	Le Devoir/The Globe and Mail	1,008	54%	46%	?	8%

Archive of polls from 1962 until January 2008

=== Voting intentions before distribution ===
History of referendum voting intentions in Quebec since 1990. Undecided non-distributed

=== Among French-speaking voters ===
History of referendum voting intentions in Quebec since 1997. French-speaking voters

Date(s) conducted	Polling organisation/client	Sample size	Should Quebec be an independent country?			Lead
Date(s) conducted	Polling organisation/client	Sample size	Yes	No	Undecided	Lead
The Parti Québécois is elected in the 2026 Quebec general election (October 5, 2026)
February 22, 2026		965	37%	53%	10	3%
April 22, 2025		993	42%	45%	12	3%
April 16, 2025		746	50%	50%	-	0%
November 11, 2024		854	45%	45%	9	0%
May 13, 2024		854	45%	43%	12	2%
April 22, 2024		977	45%	43%	12	2%
March 18, 2024		860	43%	46%	11	3%
February 5, 2024		836	43%	47%	9	4%
December 4, 2023		814	41%	47%	13	6%
November 19, 2023		970	45%	42%	13	3%
November 1, 2023		797	43%	45%	12	2%
September 28, 2023		907	43%	45%	12	2%
August 21, 2023		828	44%	44%	12	0%
June 12, 2023		803	45%	42%	13	3%
February 26, 2023		818	48%	41%	11	7%
The Coalition Avenir Québec (CAQ) is elected a 2nd term in the 2022 Quebec general election (October 3, 2022)
August 16, 2022		805	37%	45%	18	8%
June 19, 2022		822	39%	45%	17	6%
June 10, 2022		1204	41%	59%		18%
February 7, 2022		779	29%	35%	36	6%
February 9, 2021		926	39%	47%	14	8%
December 13, 2020		804	33%	42%	25	9%
The Coalition Avenir Québec (CAQ) is elected in the 2018 Quebec general election (October 1, 2018)
May 2, 2018		1,265	38.3%	61.7%		23%
March 16, 2017		724	44%	56%		12%
January 19, 2017		733	43%	57%		14%
November 10, 2016		753	46%	54%		8%
May 5, 2016		731	52%	48%		4%
February 4, 2016		736	43%	57%		14%
November 19, 2015		735	48%	52%		4%
June 11, 2015		763	49%	51%		2%
May 17, 2015		731	51%	49%		2%
November 13, 2014		1,017	45%	55%		10%
September 25, 2014		671	51%	49%		2%
August 25, 2014		681	44%	56%		12%
The Quebec Liberal Party is elected in the 2014 Quebec general election (April 7, 2014)
March 3, 2014		1,048	51%	49%		2%
January 18, 2014		978	44%	41%	15	3%
December 5, 2013		787	41%	42%	18	1%
May 6, 2013		1,008	40%	45%	15	5%
February 6, 2013		750	45%	55%		5%
November 22, 2012		798	49%	51%		2%
November 12, 2012		1,017	36%	49%	15	13%
The Parti Québécois is elected in the 2012 Quebec general election (September 4, 2012)
January 12, 2012		806	44%	42%	14	2%
May 11, 2011		824	42%	42%	15	0%
September 2, 2009		795	48%	38%	14	10%
June 27, 2009		854	52%	48%		4%
The Quebec Liberal Party is elected in the 2008 Quebec general election (December 8, 2008)
May 17, 2009		833	50%	50%		0%
May 26, 2008		909	45%	49%	6	4%
November 4, 2007			43%	52%	5	9%
May 27, 2007		810	42%	54%	4	12%
April 30, 2006			50%	50%		0%
September 11, 2005			57%	43%		14%
May 30, 2005	[]	879	55%	37%	9	8%
May 14, 2005			62%	38%		24%
April 24, 2005			60%	40%		20%
April 24, 2005	[]	879	49%	41%	11	8%
September 26, 2004	[]	879	47%	40%	13	7%
April 25, 2004	[]	893	49%	39%	12	10%
January 18, 2004	[]		53%	43%	4	10%
December 9, 2002	[]		46%	54%		8
September 1, 2002	[]		39%	56%	5	17
May 27, 2002			48%	52%		4
February 5, 2002		1,017	48%	52%		4%
January 14, 2001	[]	551	49.9%	39.7%	10.3	10%
August 20, 2000	[]		51.7%	48.3%		2%
June 22, 1999		1,002	48.6%	51.4%		3%
November 23, 1998	[]		42%	48%	10%	16%
August 27, 1998	[]		50%	41%	9	9%
February 19, 1998	[]		41%	46%	14%	5%
September 30, 1997			45%	40%	14	5%
May 21, 1997	[]	860	43%	45%	12%	2%
March 6, 1997			51%	38%	11	13%
The 1995 Quebec independence referendum is held (October 30, 1995)
June 25, 1995		1,324	52%	33%	15	19%
September 8, 1994			36%	49%	15%	13%
December 5, 1991			53.9%	29.4%	16.7	24%
April 21, 1991			54%	36%	10	18%
March 22, 1990			68%			8%
March 21, 1990			63%			8%
September 19, 1989			46%	38%	16	8%
January 18, 1982			44%	36%	20	8%

=== Among non-French speaking voters ===
Date(s) conducted	Polling organisation/client	Sample size	Should Quebec be an independent country?			Lead
Date(s) conducted	Polling organisation/client	Sample size	Yes	No	Undecided	Lead
The Parti Québécois is elected in the 2026 Quebec general election (October 5, 2026)
January 10, 2026			11%	85%	4%	73%
April 16, 2025			12%	88%	-	73%
May 13, 2024			10%	83%	6%	73%
April 22, 2024			15%	73%	12%	68%
March 18, 2024			13%	78%	10%	65%
December 4, 2023			12%	81%	8%	69%
November 19, 2023			10%	73%	17%	63%
September 28, 2023			7%	71%	22%	64%
February 26, 2023			9%	82%	9%	73%
The Coalition Avenir Québec (CAQ) is elected a 2nd term in the 2022 Quebec general election (October 3, 2022)
August 16, 2022			9%	85%	7%	76%
The Coalition Avenir Québec (CAQ) is elected in the 2018 Quebec general election (October 1, 2018)
May 2, 2018			8.6%	91.4%		82%
March 16, 2017			9%	91%		82%
January 19, 2017			7%	93%		86%
May 5, 2016			6%	94%		76%
February 4, 2016			8%	92%		84%
May 17, 2015			9%	91%		82%
August 25, 2014			8%	92%		84%
The Quebec Liberal Party is elected in the 2014 Quebec general election (April 7, 2014)
December 5, 2013			7%	84%	9%	77%
The Parti Québécois is elected in the 2012 Quebec general election (September 4, 2012)
September 2, 2009			14%	79%	7%	
June 27, 2009			16%	84%		68%
The Quebec Liberal Party is elected in the 2008 Quebec general election (December 8, 2008)
November 4, 2007			15%	81%	4%	66%
April 30, 2006			11%	89%		88%
September 1, 2002			9%	84%	7%	75%
August 20, 2000	[]		21.5%	78.5%		57%
November 23, 1998			10%	86%	4%	76%
February 19, 1998			8%	76%	16%	68%
May 21, 1997	[]		10%	77%	13%	67%
The 1995 Quebec independence referendum is held (October 30, 1995)
June 25, 1995			11%	82%	7%	71%

=== Polling by party ===
Timeline of opinion polls by party
Date(s)	Firm	Position	Sample	PQ	CAQ	QS	PCQ	Liberal	Other	Ref.
May 3, 2026	Léger	Yes		82%	16%	43%	15%	3%	PDF	
May 3, 2026	Léger	No		18%	84%	57%	85%	97%	PDF	
December 3, 2025	Léger	Yes		75%	27%	39%	20%	5%	PDF	
December 3, 2025	Léger	No		25%	73%	61%	80%	95%	PDF	
September 3, 2025	Léger	Yes		73%	27%	38%	34%	6%	PDF	
September 3, 2025	Léger	No		27%	73%	62%	66%	94%	PDF	
August 3, 2025	Léger	Yes		73%	26%	46%	9%	10%	PDF	
August 3, 2025	Léger	No		27%	74%	54%	91%	90%	PDF	
June 3, 2025	Léger	Yes		70%	29%	48%	29%	7%	PDF	
June 3, 2025	Léger	No		30%	71%	52%	71%	93%	PDF	
November 3, 2024	Léger	Yes		74%	31%	42%	18%	4%	PDF	
November 3, 2024	Léger	No		25%	64%	53%	80%	96%	PDF	
August 3, 2024	Léger	Yes		75%	33%	37%	23%	3%	PDF	
August 3, 2024	Léger	No		21%	63%	52%	74%	95%	PDF	
April 3, 2024	Léger	Yes		74%	35%	33%	13%	1%	PDF	
April 3, 2024	Léger	No		20%	58%	56%	85%	99%	PDF	
March 3, 2024	Léger	Yes		72%	34%	33%	21%	4%	PDF	
March 3, 2024	Léger	No		23%	62%	62%	74%	95%	PDF	
March 3, 2024	Léger	Yes		72%	32%	32%	18%	4%	PDF	
March 3, 2024	Léger	No		24%	62%	59%	71%	92%	PDF	
December 3, 2023	Léger	Yes		69%	40%	27%	19%	4%	PDF	
December 3, 2023	Léger	No		25%	54%	65%	77%	92%	PDF	
November 3, 2023	Léger	Yes		80%	38%	35%	12%	4%	PDF	
November 3, 2023	Léger	No		15%	54%	55%	81%	93%	PDF	
August 3, 2023	Léger	Yes		82%	36%	40%	18%	5%	PDF	
August 3, 2023	Léger	No		14%	56%	49%	75%	91%	PDF	
June 3, 2023	Léger	Yes		80%	39%	35%	17%	7%	PDF	
June 3, 2023	Léger	No		19%	50%	55%	76%	93%	PDF	
February 3, 2023	Léger	Yes		85%	42%	43%	22%	4%	PDF	
February 3, 2023	Léger	No		9%	52%	45%	72%	93%	PDF	
October 3, 2020	Léger	Yes		84%	41%	51%		8%	PDF	
October 3, 2020	Léger	No		12%	55%	42%		90%	PDF	
November 3, 2016	Léger	Yes		81%	22%	57%		4%	PDF	
November 3, 2016	Léger	No		19%	78%	43%		96%	PDF	
February 3, 2016	Léger	Yes		80%	25%	53%		5%	PDF	
February 3, 2016	Léger	No		20%	75%	47%		95%	PDF	

== Arguments ==
=== Reasons for sovereignty ===
Justifications for Quebec's sovereignty are historically nationalistic in character, claiming the unique culture and French-speaking majority (78% of the provincial population) are threatened with assimilation by either the rest of Canada or, as in Metropolitan France, by Anglophone culture more generally, and that the best way to preserve language, identity and culture is via the creation of an independent political entity.

The historical argument for Quebec independence stems from the region's history, as it was conquered by the British in 1760 and ceded to Great Britain in the 1763 Treaty of Paris; French Canadians in Canada were subsumed by waves of British immigrants. This argument makes the claim that Quebecers have the right of self-determination.

Eight of the other Canadian provinces are overwhelmingly (greater than 95%) English-speaking, while New Brunswick is officially bilingual and about one-third Francophone. Another rationale is based on resentment of anti-Quebec sentiment. With regard to the creation of the sovereignist movement, language issues were but a sub-stratum of larger cultural, social and political differences. Many scholars point to historical events as framing the cause for ongoing support for sovereignty in Quebec, while more contemporary politicians may point to the aftermath of more recent developments like the Canada Act of 1982, the Meech Lake Accord or the Charlottetown Accord.

=== Arguments against sovereignty ===
It has been argued by prominent Quebecers (sovereignists and ex-sovereignists, including former Quebec premier Lucien Bouchard) that sovereignty politics has distracted Quebecers from the real economic problems of Quebec, and that sovereignty by itself cannot solve those problems. In 2005 they published their position statement, Pour un Québec lucide, ("For a lucid Quebec") which details the problems facing Quebec.

Some arguments against sovereignty claim that the movement is illegitimate because of its Eurocentrism which alienates many among Canada's First Nations, as well as the Inuit, and Métis peoples and their sympathizers. This sentiment is summed up by a quotation from a Mohawk from Akwsasne: "How can Quebec, with no economic base and no land base, ask to become sovereign? How can Quebec be a nation when they have no constitution? We have had a constitution since before the American revolution". Here the argument expresses the claim that the Mohawk nation has a greater case for self-determination due to already having a more legitimate claim to distinct nationhood that is based on traditional lands and a constitution predating confederation as well as the creation of Quebec and a Québécois identity.

Similarly, the Cree have also asserted for many years that they are a separate people with the right to self-determination recognized under international law. They argue that no annexation of them or their territory to an independent Quebec should take place without their consent, and that if Quebec has the right to leave Canada then the Cree people have the right to choose to keep their territory in Canada. Cree arguments generally do not claim the right to secede from Canada; rather, the Cree see themselves as a people bound to Canada by treaty (see the James Bay and Northern Quebec Agreement), and as citizens of Canada. The Cree have stated that a unilateral declaration of independence by Quebec would be a violation of fundamental principles of human rights, democracy and consent. If secession were to proceed, the Cree argue that they would seek protection through the Canadian courts as well as asserting Cree jurisdiction over its people and lands.

Professor Peter Russell has said of Indigenous peoples in Canada: "(they) are not nations that can be yanked out of Canada against their will by a provincial majority.... With few exceptions (they) wish to enjoy their right to self-government within Canada, not within a sovereign Quebec." International human rights expert Erica-Irene Daes says the change "will leave the most marginalized and excluded of all the world's peoples without a legal, peaceful weapon to press for genuine democracy...." This concern is connected to the claim that if Quebec were to be considered its own autonomous nation-state then it need not honour the treaties and agreements that were signed between First Nations and the British and French Crowns and are now maintained by the Canadian federal government. Concern for this may stem from perception of neo-colonial or eurocentric attitudes in the leadership of former Quebec premiers, such as Robert Bourassa, the self-proclaimed "Conqueror of the North".

== Opinions in Quebec ==
=== Francophones ===
The sovereignty movement draws its largest support from the francophones of Quebec, and from all sides of the political spectrum. Francophones from Quebec City and more rural regions are thought to support the idea more, while people in Gatineau may do so less, perhaps due to their close proximity to and influence from Ottawa.

=== Anglophones ===
Sovereignty has historically had little support among Anglo-Quebecers. Some anglophone Quebecers see the movement as a rejection of non-Francophones, or as an attempt to suppress their English language and deny the historical Anglophone contribution to Quebec. Some opponents may also view the project as ethnically exclusive.

=== Immigrants and Allophones ===
Support for sovereignty varies greatly among different immigrant or allophone communities, and it has also changed throughout the decades. In the 1995 referendum, Haitian, Arab and Latin American immigrant communities voted "Yes", though for the rest the "No" won out.

=== Indigenous peoples ===
Various Indigenous peoples in Quebec, such as Cree and Inuit, have historically opposed the independence of Quebec, mostly due to worries about territorial rights.

== Economic effect ==
One study found that Quebec's separatist governments did not have a large negative impact on Quebec's economy – as sometimes seen with other independence movements in other countries – possibly due to a lack of violence.

In 2025, Parti Québécois PQ leader, Paul St-Pierre Plamondon stated that if a sovereignty referendum were successful, Quebec would establish its own currency up to a decade after the vote. The PQ would also consider establishing an independent commission to evaluate creating its own currency, keeping the Canadian dollar, or adopting the American dollar.

== Political effect ==
Without Quebec, the remaining parts of Canada would likely see a shift toward more conservative federal election outcomes, as Quebec voters have historically provided a crucial base of support for the federal Liberal Party. Political analysts note that the federal Liberal Party frequently relies on seats in Quebec to form government. Without these ridings, the Liberals would lose a major pillar of their traditional coalition.

== External positions ==
=== France ===
During his visit to Expo 67 in Montreal, French president Charles de Gaulle's remarked, "Vive le Québec libre !" ("Long live free Quebec!") This declaration was consistent with de Gaulle's thinking, as he was attached to the idea of the independence of nations and sensitive to the historical impact of France's loss of New France to the British in the 18th century.

In September 1965, de Gaulle told Alain Peyrefitte: "The future of French Canada is independence. There will be a French Republic of Canada". According to Alain Peyrefitte, "without prejudging the form that Quebec sovereignty was to take, de Gaulle, with that historic sense which earned France its salvation, went to Montreal in July 1967 to urge French Canadians to preserve their French identity, which, under Louis XV, the indifference of the French elites had made such light work of.

Similarly, when the French ambassador in Ottawa suggested associating France with Canada's centenary, De Gaulle replied with an apostille dated December 6, 1966: "There is no question of my sending a message to Canada to celebrate its 'centenary'. We can have good relations with the whole of what is now Canada. We must have excellent relations with French Canada. But we should not congratulate Canadians or ourselves on the creation of a 'state' based on our defeat in the past, and on the integration of part of the French people into a British entity. Incidentally, this whole has become quite precarious...".

The French Foreign Office's current motto epitomizes the official position of the French State concerning Quebec's national question: "non-ingérence et non-indifférence" ("no interference and no indifference"). In other words, while Quebec stays within Canada, France will officially support the Canadian Confederation the way it is.

Former French president Nicolas Sarkozy has stated on the record that he opposes the separation of Quebec from Canada. This changed back to a neutral stance under Sarkozy's successor, François Hollande.

=== United States ===
The United States has officially always maintained a neutral attitude towards Quebec independence. However, since the relationship between Canada and the United States is privileged at various levels, the status quo is desired. In the event of a victory for the independence option in the 1995 referendum, Washington would have stated that "since Canadians have yet to work out their future constitutional arrangements, it is premature to consider the question of recognizing Quebec". Thus, it is thought that, in the event of independence, the United States would be passive and wait for Canada itself to recognize the Quebec state.

The sovereigntists of the 1960s and 1970s, led by René Lévesque, believed they could easily win American sympathy for their cause, because they equated Quebec's independence with the United States' American Revolution against Great Britain in 1776. For 20th-century Americans, however, the idea of Quebec's separation was more akin to the most painful episode in their history, the American Civil War. What's more, the 20th century prevalence of the melting pot cultural mythos made them resistant to any idea of intrastate nationalism.

"Melting pot, civil war. Two ideological walls that separate Quebec nationalists from American society, even left-wing, even intellectual."

— Jean-Francois Lisée

John F. Kennedy is said to be the only American politician open to this prospect. In the 1950s, Armand Morissette, the parish priest of Lowell, Massachusetts, informed him of the existence of an independence movement in Quebec. In order to gain access to the Senate, Kennedy wanted to win the votes of the large French-Canadian community in Massachusetts, so he had contact with Morissette, who was a convinced independentist. Kennedy drew parallels not with American independence, but with Irish independence, which was still quite recent (1922), as he himself was of Irish descent. The Kennedy family were Francophiles, and that the future president generally supported the self-determination of peoples. During his short term as President (1961–1963), however, Kennedy never publicly addressed this issue.

== In popular culture ==
=== Films and television ===
- Richard Rohmer's novel Separation (1976) was turned into a TV-movie for the CTV network in 1977. In the movie, the Parti Québécois has formed the government of Quebec but Premier Gaston Bélisle has repeatedly put off its promise to hold a referendum. International politics forces Bélisle's hand.
- In the mid-1980s, a sequel to Separation, Quebec-Canada 1995, depicts a meeting between the president of Quebec and the prime minister of Canada to discuss a crisis involving Quebec military occupations of parts of Ontario and New Brunswick. Canada's armed forces are stretched thin with peacekeepers in such varied places as the Falkland Islands (with "Lady Goosegreen" being Margaret Thatcher).
- In the film Die Hard, Hans Gruber, the terrorist leader, demands, as a ruse, the release of imprisoned members of the fictional group Liberté du Québec, which is presumably meant to be a fictional version of the FLQ.
- In the Simpsons episode "Homer to the Max", Homer Simpson is invited to an exclusive garden party by Trent Steel, a successful businessman whom he meets as a result of changing his name to Max Power. President Bill Clinton, a guest at the garden party, is called away to deal with Quebec "getting the bomb".
- In The Critic episode "L.A. Jay", in a dream sequence, Jay Sherman, at his Oscar acceptance speech says he supports independence for Quebec, cutting to a room of Québécois saying "Viva Jay Sherman! Viva Quebec!" and unfurling a banner depicting Sherman as a beaver.
- In the Dan Vs. episode "Dan vs. Canada", revenge-minded main character Dan swears vengeance on Canada after an accident leaves him drenched in maple syrup. While seeking a way to destroy Canada's largest glacier as revenge, Dan unwittingly teams up with a group of Quebecois separatists, only to get kicked out of their group when he says they're not really French and are just "geographically confused".

=== Books ===
- William Weintraub's satirical 1979 novel The Underdogs provoked controversy by imagining a future Quebec in which English-speakers were an oppressed minority, complete with a violent resistance movement. One planned stage version was cancelled before its premiere.
- Margaret Atwood's 1979 novel Life Before Man is set in Toronto in the late 1970s and several characters watch and sometimes comment upon the elections and sovereignist movement in Quebec. The sovereignist movement and its struggles are metaphorically linked to the difficulties the characters in the novel have with separating their own personal relationships.
- Clive Cussler's 1984 novel Night Probe! is set against a fictional attempt at secession in the late 1980s. Rights to newly discovered oil resources in Ungava Bay, discovered as Quebec moves to secede, clash with the ramifications of a rediscovered secret treaty negotiated between the U.K. and U.S. governments during World War I.
- In the alternate history 1995 novel The Two Georges, co-authored by Richard Dreyfuss and Harry Turtledove, the American Revolution never occurs, resulting in the creation of the North American Union, a dominion of the British Empire. En route to the Six Nations, Thomas Bushell and Samuel Stanley of the Royal American Mounted Police discuss the nearby province of Quebec. Stanley muses that, being culturally French, the Québécois people would want to split off from the N.A.U. to become part of the Franco-Spanish Holy Alliance. However, the Francophobia of the Sons of Liberty prevents them from effectively joining forces with Québécois separatists.
- David Foster Wallace's 1996 novel Infinite Jest includes both real and fictional Québécois separatist movements as integral to the plot. In the story, the United States has merged with Canada and Mexico to form the Organization of North American Nations (ONAN). Wheelchair-using Quebec separatists use a video so entertaining it leads to death to accomplish their goals of both Quebec independence and the end of the ONAN.
- In the Southern Victory Series (1997–2007) of alternate history novels by Harry Turtledove, Quebec becomes a separate nation during the First Great War (an alternative World War I). Since the United States organized this separation to weaken Anglophone Canada (and the UK by extension) and to aid in the post-war occupation of Canada, the Republic of Quebec operated as a client state of the United States, rather than being truly independent.
- In the 1999 novel Babylon Babies by the French-born Canadian cyberpunk writer Maurice Dantec, loosely adapted as the film Babylon A.D., Quebec is independent and referred to as the "Free Province of Quebec".
- The 1999 novel Flashforward is about the entire world experiencing visions of life twenty years in the future. Among the impacts of this, the Quebec sovereignty movement is deemed futile and loses most of its support because the visions reveal that Quebec will still not be sovereign after twenty years.
- In Peter Watts' science fiction series, starting with the 1999 Starfish, Quebec has attained sovereignty and is an energetic/economic superpower within North America.
- In the 2006 young adults' alternate history novel The Disunited States of America, by Harry Turtledove, the United States collapsed in the 1800s due to the retention of the Articles of Confederation, with states becoming sovereign nations by the 2090s. Quebec is an independent country in the 2090s, although it is not mentioned whether it remained an independent entity or seceded from a Canadian union.

=== Comics ===
- In DC Comics, the villain (and sometimes hero) Plastique is initially a Québécois freedom fighter, who resorts to acts of terrorism.
- In Marvel Comics, the superhero Northstar was part of the Front de libération du Québec (FLQ) in his youth.
- In Axis Powers Hetalia, Canada's nightmare features an independent Quebec.

=== Games ===
- In the roleplaying game Trinity, there are references made to a separatist Quebec nation who in return for independence helped the then formed "Confederated States of America" take control of Canada.
- In the roleplaying game Shadowrun, Quebec exists as a sovereign nation alongside the United Canadian American States and the Confederated American States.
- Canadian Civil War is a board game from 1977. The game simulates a hypothetical political struggle between factions, some of them seeking to redefine the terms of the Canadian confederation, others seeking to maintain the status quo.

== See also ==
- List of subjects related to the Quebec independence movement
- Autonomism in Quebec
- Quebec nationalism
- Politics of Quebec
- Alberta separatism
- Canadian sovereignty
- Lists of active separatist movements
- Secessionist movements of Canada
