= Pierre Bourgault =

Canadian politician (1934–2003)

Leader of the Rassemblement pour l'Indépendance Nationale
- In office 1964–1968
- Preceded by: Guy Pouliot
- Succeeded by: party dissolved

Personal details
- Born: January 23, 1934 East Angus, Quebec, Canada
- Died: June 16, 2003 (aged 69) Montreal, Quebec, Canada
- Resting place: Notre Dame des Neiges Cemetery
- Party: Parti Québécois (1968–1981); Rassemblement pour l'Indépendance Nationale (1960–1968)
- Awards: Prix Condorcet (2001); Prix Jules-Fournier (2000); Prix Georges-Émile-Lapalme (1997); Prix Air Canada (1983)

Pierre Bourgault (January 23, 1934 – June 16, 2003) was a politician and essayist, as well as an actor and journalist, from Quebec, Canada. He is most famous as a public speaker who advocated sovereignty for Quebec from Canada.

== Biography ==
Bourgault was born in East Angus in the Estrie (Eastern Townships) region of Quebec. His father was a civil servant and his mother, a homemaker. His parents sent him to boarding school at age seven, determined that he should receive the education which they lacked. After secondary school, he briefly attended the seminary and entertained the idea of a possible entry into the priesthood, per ancestral tradition, but reneged on his obligation shortly thereafter. He is today entombed within the traditionally Catholic Notre Dame des Neiges Cemetery in Montreal.

Beginning in the early 1960s, he supported Quebec independence from Canada and in 1960 joined the pro-independence Rassemblement pour l'indépendance nationale. A famed and inflammatory orator, he led a number of union strikes and marches that resulted in violence. In 1964, he became leader of the RIN, and came up just short in the Duplessis riding of Northern Quebec. During the St. Jean Baptiste celebration in 1968, a demonstration for Quebec nationalism turned into a riot when other supporters threw projectiles at newly minted Prime Minister Pierre Trudeau. He and 300 others were arrested for this incident, while Trudeau's stoic response significantly helped.

In 1964, he made a small appearance in Denis Héroux's student film Over My Head (Jusqu'au cou), as himself in a political debate.

In 1968, popular cabinet minister and television host René Lévesque founded Mouvement Souveraineté-Association, a more moderate sovereignist party. Lévesque rebuffed an attempt to have the RIN included en masse, fearing the RIN's reputation for protests and violence would hurt the movement. Bourgeault disbanded the party and invited its members to join the MSA one by one and the new Ralliement national in the newly founded Parti Québécois, under Lévesque's leadership.

In the 1970 Quebec election, he was the Parti Québécois candidate in Mercier electoral district, running unsuccessfully against Liberal leader (and soon-to-be Premier) Robert Bourassa, who would become a close personal friend. Bourgault himself did not play any role in the PQ government that came to power in the 1976 Quebec election and was given a patronage appointment. He often quarreled with Lévesque, especially in the lead up to the 1980 referendum because he disagreed with the strategy on sovereignty advocated by the premier of Quebec. Bourgault left the PQ in the early 1980s.

In his early life, he was a journalist at Montreal newspaper La Presse, and he returned to this publication in the 1990s as a columnist for Le Journal de Montréal newspaper. After 1976, he was a professor of communications at the Université du Québec à Montréal (UQAM). He was also the co-host or regular columnist of several radio shows aired on la Société Radio-Canada, the French language sector of the Canadian Broadcasting Corporation.

In 1992, he had an acting role in the film Léolo, cast by director Jean-Claude Lauzon. to whom Bourgault was a mentor. Lauzon denied he was cast for political reasons.

He was openly gay, though he said in an interview for Radio-Canada a few years before his death that in his later years he chose to stop having sexual relations.

Bourgault was a fluent and eloquent speaker of English. For a brief period in the 1980s, he was a weekly columnist for Montreal's anglophone daily, The Gazette.

== Candidacy ==
1970 Quebec general election: Mercier
Party	Candidate	Votes	%	±%
Liberal	Robert Bourassa	15,337	46.65	+2.38
Parti Québécois	Pierre Bourgault	12,276	37.34	-
Union Nationale	Conrad Touchette	4,145	12.61	-29.71
Ralliement créditiste	Clément Patry	1,011	3.08	-
Independent	Paul Ouellet	106	0.32	-
Total valid votes		32,875	100.0	
Source: Official Results, Le Directeur général des élections du Québec.

1966 Quebec general election: Duplessis
Party	Candidate	Votes	%
Liberal	Henri-Laurier Coiteux	6,673	47.77
RIN	Pierre Bourgault	4,392	31.44
Union Nationale	André Haince	2,709	19.39
Ralliement national	Jacques Brunet	195	1.40
Total valid votes		13,969	98.12
Total rejected ballots		268	1.88
Turnout		14,237	75.46
Electors on the lists		18,867	–

== Works ==
- Québec quitte ou double, 1970
- Oui à l'indépendance du Québec, 1977
- Le plaisir de la liberté, 1983
- Écrits polémiques 1960-1981, 1989
- Moi, je m'en souviens, 1989
- Maintenant ou jamais, entretiens, 1990
- Écrits polémiques 1. La Politique, Montréal, VLB éditeur, 1982
- Écrits polémiques 2. La Culture, Montréal, VLB éditeur, 1983
- Écrits polémiques, Montréal, Boréale compact, 1988
- Écrits polémiques 3. La Colère, Montréal, Lanctôt éditeur, 1996
- Écrits polémiques 4. La Résistance, Montréal, VLB éditeur, 1999

== Biographies ==
- Andrée LeBel, Pierre Bourgault, le plaisir de la liberté (entretiens), Nouvelle optique, 1983.
- Jean-François Nadeau, Bourgault, Lux éditeur, 2013.

== Filmography ==
- Jean-Claude Labrecque, Le RIN, Production Virage/Télé-Québec, 2002.
- Manuel Foglia, Paroles et liberté, Productions J, 2007.
- C’était Bourgault, with Marie-Claude Beaucage and Franco Nuovo, Société Radio-Canada, 2013

== Podcast ==
Pierre Bourgault: Podcast, BaladoQuébec, 2018.

== Awards ==
- 1983 - Prix Air Canada
- 1997 - Prix Georges-Émile-Lapalme
- 2000 - Prix Jules-Fournier
- 2001 - Prix Condorcet

== Note ==
Some items from the sections, Works, Biographies, Filmography and Podcast were copied and adapted from the French Wikipedia page of Pierre Bourgault. See that page's history for attribution.
