= Rassemblement pour l'Indépendance Nationale =

Rally for National Independence Rassemblement pour l'Indépendance Nationale
- Abbreviation: RIN
- President: André d'Allemagne (1960-1961); Marcel Chaput (1961-1962); Guy Pouliot (1962-1964); Pierre Bourgault (1964-1968)
- Founded: September 10, 1960
- Dissolved: October 28, 1968
- Split from: Alliance Laurentienne
- Merged into: Parti Québécois
- Headquarters: 8401, Saint-Hubert, Montreal, Quebec
- Membership (December 1966): 5102
- Ideology: Quebec sovereigntism Social democracy Planned Economy
- Political position: Big tent
- Colours: Varied

The Rassemblement pour l'Indépendance Nationale (French pronunciation: [ʁasɑ̃bləmɑ̃ puʁ lɛ̃depɑ̃dɑ̃s nɑsjɔnal]; RIN; English: Rally for National Independence) was a political organization dedicated to the promotion of Quebec national independence from Canada.

Torn during its existence between different ideological tendencies, the RIN essentially represented the left wing of the Quebec sovereignty movement of the 1960s.

The RIN participated in negotiations during 1968 with a view to unifying different independence parties but was ultimately excluded from the final negotiations leading to the formation of the Parti Québécois. On October 26, 1968, the party congress decided, on the proposal of President Pierre Bourgault, to dissolve and called on its members to join individually the Parti Québécois.

== History ==
The Rassemblement pour l'Indépendance Nationale was founded on September 10, 1960, by about 30 people at the very beginning of the Quiet Revolution. The founders included many of former Alliance Laurentienne members. (The Alliance Laurentienne was dissolved after the creation of the RIN.) The founding members included André D'Allemagne, Jacques Bellemare, and Marcel Chaput. Other prominent members included Andrée Ferretti, Hubert Aquin and Raymond Villeneuve. D'Allemagne, having participated in the Alliance Laurentienne, said that he had found the Alliance's right-wing tendencies quite unpleasant, which was a factor leading to the creation of an officially-neutral organization. However, as the RIN attracted many new young members it quickly became associated with more radical left-wing ideas.

In October 1960, the first general assembly of the organization published its manifesto calling for the independence of Quebec. Pierre Bourgault, who had joined shortly after foundation, became its president in 1964. Following the wish of the members, as expressed in a resolution in 1963, the RIN was turned into a political party. Bourgault and his impassioned and fiery speeches contributed largely to the popularity of the RIN, and he is often wrongly believed to be the founder of the movement.

In 1963, Georges Schoeters, Raymond Villeneuve and Gabriel Hudon, ex-members of the RIN youth wing, left the party to form the underground revolutionary Front de Libération du Québec.

In the 1966 Quebec general election, the RIN, along with the Ralliement National (RN) won about 8.8% of the popular vote and no seats. Bourgault lost the northern Duplessis riding by a very small margin, a great accomplishment for such a third party. Although it never gathered a high number of votes in Quebec, it played an important role in the birth of the modern "indépendantiste" movement in Quebec and was very active in public demonstrations. Famous protests of the RIN include a 1964 demonstration disapproving the visit of Queen Elizabeth II to Quebec, and a 1968 protest about the presence of Pierre Trudeau on Saint-Jean-Baptiste Day that turned to riot. Their members and supporters were also present in the Montreal crowd and their symbols visible when French President Charles de Gaulle shouted his famed "Vive le Québec Libre" (Long live free Quebec).

In October 1967, the charismatic Quebec Liberal Party Member of the National Assembly and former cabinet minister René Lévesque left his party when its members voted to not debate his idea of two independent but associated states (Quebec and Canada). Shortly afterward, the Mouvement Souveraineté-Association was founded with Lévesque as leader. The RIN quickly engaged in talks over a possible merger with the MSA. Bourgault and D'Allemagne strongly believed that the forces for Quebec independence had to unite to challenge the "old parties" (Liberals and Union Nationale).

Bourgault and Lévesque started to clash, as Lévesque had come to distrust the RIN because of its perceived rowdy behaviour. Additional opposition to the idea of a merger came from within the RIN itself; some militants such as Ferretti were heartbroken at the prospect of the "end" of their party. Ultimately, however, the desire for a strong independentist force carried the day. By 1968, the [Mouvement Souveraineté-Association had come to an agreement with the Ralliement National to form the Parti Québécois and deliberately excluded the RIN as an entity. The RIN was divided on its position towards the PQ but ended up being dissolved, some of its members joining Lévesque's newly-created party.

== Leaders ==
- André D'Allemagne (1960-1961)
- Marcel Chaput (1961-1962)
- Guy Pouliot (1962-1964)
- Pierre Bourgault (1964-1968)

== Publication ==
The party had its own periodical, which was published monthly and then biweekly.

- L'Indépendance. Organe officiel du Rassemblement pour l'indépendance nationale, vol. 1, issue 1 (September 1962) - vol. 6, issue 20 (September 1968)

== Election results ==
General election	# of candidates	# of seats won	% of popular vote
1966	73	0	5.55%

== See also ==
- Politics of Quebec
- List of Quebec general elections
- List of Quebec premiers
- List of Quebec leaders of the Opposition
- National Assembly of Quebec
- Timeline of Quebec history
- Political parties in Quebec
- Quebec Sovereignism
- Secessionist movements of Canada
