= Bill 104, Quebec =

Quebec act to modify the Charter of the French Language

L.Q. 2002, Chap. 28

36th Quebec Legislature
- Long title: An act to amend the charter of the French language
- Citation: Official Text
- Territorial extent: Canada, Quebec
- Passed: June 12th, 2002
- Royal assent: June 13th, 2002
- Commenced: October 1st, 2002
- Abrogated: Does not apply (Bill 115 greatly modified Bill 104)
- Status: In force (amended)

The Act to amend the Charter of the French Language (known as "Bill 104") (Note: The expression "Bill 104" comes from the fact that this is the 104th bill tabled by the government during a parliamentary session (the 2nd session of the 36th legislature). There have been many "Bill 104s" in Quebec's history, since each parliamentary session starts all over again from 1.) is a Quebec amending act (Note: An amending law is a law that modifies another existing law. In this case, Bill 104 amends four statutes: the Charter of the French Language (L.R.Q., chapter C-11), the Financial Administration Act (L.R.Q., chapter A-6.001), the Labour Code (L.R.Q., chapter C-27) and the Securities Act (L.R.Q., chapter V-1.1).) introduced by the Landry government in 2002, which made adjustments to several provisions of Quebec's language policy. Its main objective was to rectify the Charter of the French Language in response to the recommendations of the Estates-General on the Situation and Future of the French Language in Quebec.

One of the most important changes made was the modification of the criteria for a child's eligibility to attend a publicly funded English-language school. However, in 2009, this amendment was ruled unconstitutional by the Supreme Court of Canada. In 2010, the Charest government passed Bill 115, rendering null and void the amendments implemented under Bill 104.

Bill 104 also led to the reorganization of government agencies working in the language field. This reorganization led to the creation of the Office québécois de la langue française (OQLF), In English Quebec Board of the French Language. Bill 104 was passed by the National Assembly of Quebec on June 12, 2002, and came into force on October 1, 2002, with the exception of certain provisions.

== Historical context ==
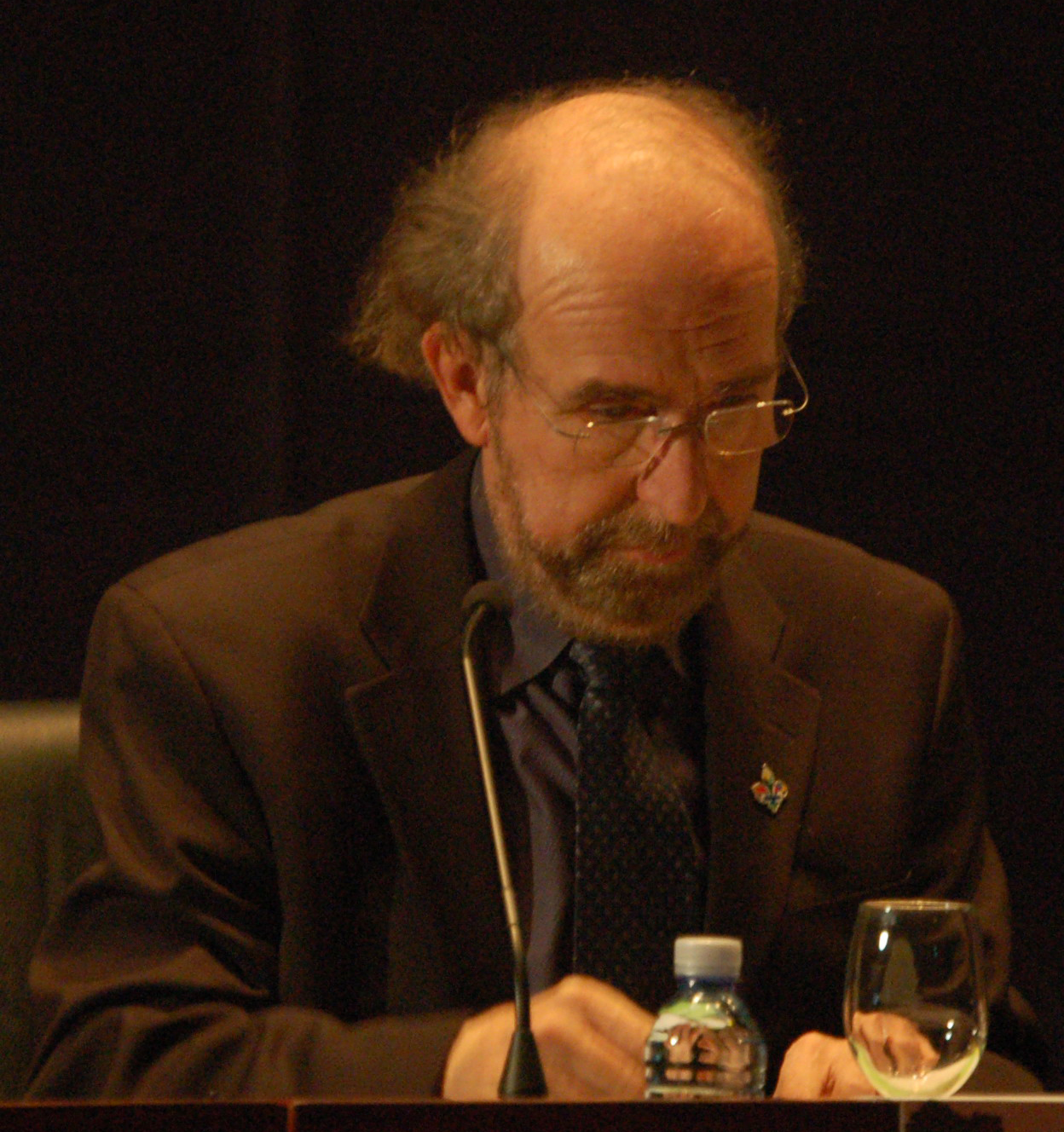
Gérald Larose, president of The Estates-General.

=== The Estates General ===
In June 2000, PQ Minister Louise Beaudoin announced the Estates-General on the Situation and Future of the French Language in Quebec. The aim of this major consultation was to renew the government's public policies on language protection. The report Le français, une langue pour tout le monde (French, a language for everyone) was made public in August 2001, and presented the government with 149 recommendations aimed at "ensuring the use, influence and quality of the French language in Quebec."

The Act to amend the Charter of the French Language is intended as a follow-up to the report of the Estates General. Although it does not take up all the recommendations, the Act is inspired by many of them.

=== Subsidized English school ===
Explanatory table of access to primary and secondary schools in Quebec
Subsidized school (private or public) (Note: In Quebec, many private schools are also subsidized by the government.)		Unsubsidized school
French	English	Everyone
Everyone	Children who had most of their education in English in Canada; Children of a Canadian parent who received most of his or her education in English in Canada; Siblings of children who have access; Children with special authorization. (Note: Le ministère de l'Éducation peut décerner une autorisation spéciale à un enfant pour qu'il puisse fréquenter l'école anglaise subventionnée. Cette autorisation peut être donnée soit pour des motifs humanitaires ou soit pour aider un élève à surmonter des difficultés d'apprentissage (Source: Charte, art. 81.))	Everyone
(Source of table: Charter, art. 73.) (Note: This table is deliberately a summary, omitting many details. For more complete information, consult Langue de l'éducation au Québec.)

One of the law's most important measures is the amendment of section 73 of the Charter of the French Language. This section reserves access to state-subsidized English-language schools for English speakers. This measure, which dates back to the 1970s, was designed to make attendance at French schools compulsory for Francophones and allophones, while allowing the English-speaking minority to continue attending English schools. In all cases, schools that do not receive government subsidies are not subject to the law, and parents can choose to send their children to French or English schools. In 2012, there were some fifteen unsubsidized private schools.

To determine whether a child is part of the English-speaking minority entitled to subsidized English-language schools, the Charter of the French Language establishes certain criteria (see table opposite). Generally speaking, these criteria are based on the education the child is currently receiving, or the education received by the child's parents. In all cases, education received outside Canada is not taken into account. These criteria were partly set by the National Assembly when it adopted the Charter of the French Language, but were eventually expanded (initially only English-language education received in Quebec by a child or his or her family would be taken into account when deciding), but were also dictated by section 23 of the Canadian Charter of Rights and Freedoms. (Note: Since Quebec did not consent to the adoption of the Canadian Charter of Rights and Freedoms, the existence of Section 23 is the subject of a dispute between Quebec and the rest of Canada. See: Kitchen Accord.)

Over the years, however, many people have managed to circumvent the Charter criteria. By sending the child to an unsubsidized English school for the first year of school, the parents were able to apply for admission to a subsidized school at the end of the year. The child had thus spent "most" of his or her primary education in English. Some therefore accused these people of "buying" a language right, since they only had to pay for their child's unsubsidized school to benefit from a right reserved for the English-speaking minority.

The number of people who have benefited from this bypass varies widely according to calculations. Depending on the source, it can range from around a hundred to over four thousand people. The difference can be explained by the fact that some groups only count people who spent a short time at an unsubsidized school and then went on to a subsidized school, whereas the government takes into account all those who spent time at an unsubsidized English school even though they were not eligible for a subsidized school.

This led to the emergence of what some have called "bridge schools." Many unsubsidized English-language schools took in students for a few weeks, or even a few months, simply to allow these children to "pass through" to the subsidized English-language network.

Bill 104 was therefore an attempt to respond to this phenomenon. The Estates General on the French language had highlighted the decline in the French-speaking population on the island of Montreal. The language of instruction policy was one way of countering this phenomenon.

== Adoption of the law ==
=== Adoption of the bill ===
Bill 104 was presented to the National Assembly of Quebec by Diane Lemieux, Minister responsible for the application of the Charter of the French Language, on May 7, 2002. The final vote took place on June 12, 2002, when all members of the National Assembly, regardless of party affiliation, voted in favor of its adoption. Members came from the Parti québécois, the Liberal Party and the Action démocratique party.

Special consultations were held on May 15, 16 and 23 to hear the views of organizations wishing to comment on the bill, and the Culture Commission met on May 31, June 4 and 6 to study the bill in detail.

The Lieutenant Governor assented to the Act on June 13, 2002, and it came into force on October 1, 2002. However, certain sections only came into force when the government considered it appropriate. All these sections are now in force, with the exception of section 1 of the bill (see section on Language in Public Administration).

=== Positions of political parties ===
As the bill was introduced by the Landry government, it enjoyed the support of the PQ members, who had a majority in the National Assembly. The Liberal Party spoke in favor of the general idea behind the bill, but opposed several of its provisions. During the vote on the general principle, Official Opposition spokesperson on the Charter of the French Language, Pierre-Étienne Laporte, expressed reservations about the fusion of the various bodies responsible for language policy and the lack of flexibility in modifying section 73 of the Charter. Despite his concerns about the rigidity of section 73, the Liberals were in agreement with excluding the attendance of an unsubsidized English school in the calculation required to gain access to a subsidized English school. During the vote to pass the bill, Liberal MP Benoît Pelletier supported the government's desire to protect the French language:

"This absence of quarrelling, so to speak, is what we call linguistic peace. We benefit from it today, we enjoy it. We in the Official Opposition are delighted with it, and our goal, Mr. Chairman, is to preserve linguistic peace and to continue in this kind of atmosphere that is extremely favorable to dialogue between the French-speaking majority and the English-speaking minority in Quebec."

— Benoît Pelletier, Speech at the adoption of the bill

The two Action démocratique du Québec MPs did not intervene in the debate on the bill.

== Content ==
Act 104 has been modified in five different ways:

1. the language of instruction in primary and secondary schools (see section 3.1);
2. government bodies dealing with language issues (see section 3.2);
3. the language policies of Quebec colleges and universities (see section 3.3.);
4. language in public administration (see section 3.4);
5. language in the workplace (see section 3.5).

=== Language of instruction ===
==== The modification ====
The importance of the provisions of the Charter of the French Language relating to schooling in French no longer needs to be demonstrated. They must continue to play a decisive role in the linguistic orientation of Quebec's predominantly French-speaking society. [...] To achieve this in Quebec, it had to be induced by the Charter of the French Language, because of the force of attraction exerted by English. Even today, this achievement remains fragile, as some people relentlessly challenge the principle of French-language schooling in Quebec.3

— Diane Lemieux, Speech on the presentation of the principle of the bill

The bill amends section 73 of the Charter of the French Language in two ways.

The first change prohibits the use of years spent in unsubsidized English schools to determine eligibility for subsidized English schools. All parents, whatever their mother tongue, can continue to send their children to the school of their choice if it is not subsidized by the state. However, this stay at a private school will not facilitate their eligibility for a subsidized English school. In the past, some children took advantage of a stay at an unsubsidized private school to gain access to a subsidized English school. This right of access to the subsidized school was automatically valid for future children, as well as for the child's siblings. With this measure, the Minister wished to reinforce the obligation for Francophones and allophones to attend French schools.

The second important change affected people who attend subsidized English schools because of a special authorization. Certain children who do not normally have access to a subsidized English school may apply to the Minister of Education for special authorization to attend such schools. This exception is granted on humanitarian grounds or because of learning difficulties. This exception procedure continues to exist after the bill, but this stay at the subsidized English school no longer entitles the applicant to send his or her future children to the subsidized school. Similarly, when the bill was passed, there was some debate as to whether the siblings of a child subject to special authorization could attend a subsidized school with him or her. Several groups in parliamentary commission had criticized the government's position of not allowing siblings to attend the same school when one of them benefited from a special authorization. The Liberal Party supported this request and the Minister decided to amend her bill to allow siblings to attend the same school as the child benefiting from special authorization.

The official opposition at the time, the Quebec Liberal Party, spoke out in favor of these changes. The only groups opposed to the amendment were associations representing English-language schools. La Association des écoles privées du Québec (AEPQ), The Quebec Association of Private Schools, denounced the measure as further contributing to the isolation of linguistic communities and undermining efforts to integrate French and English speakers in English schools. The AEPQ proposed that the government amend the bill to exclude only students attending unsubsidized private schools for less than three years. In the Association's view, this measure would have targeted legislative intervention solely at children making a short stay simply to buy the right to attend an English school. This position was supported by several other groups in the English-speaking community. This proposal was not accepted by Minister Lemieux.

On the other hand, some groups called on the Minister to go further in modifying the rules regarding the language of instruction in Quebec. The Mouvement national des Québécoises et Québécois (MNQ) and The Centrale des syndicats du Québec (CSQ) demanded that the Quebec government initiate proceedings to amend Section 23 of the Canadian Charter of Rights and Freedoms so that it no longer applies to Quebec. These two groups mainly criticized the fact that this section obliges Quebec to offer subsidized English-language education to Canadian citizens (following a move to Quebec, for example), even if they had not received their education in Quebec. This change would have required the agreement of the federal government, which seemed unlikely. The Minister did not take up this request.

Comparison of section 73 of the Charter before and after Bill 104
Section 73 of the Charter prior to law no. 104 (1993-2002)	Section 73 of the Charter after law no. 104 (2002-2010) (Note: In 2010, section 73 was amended by Bill 115. It no longer appears in the form in which it was amended by Bill 104.)
73. At the request of one of their parents, children may be taught in English:	73. At the request of one of their parents, children may be taught in English:
1° children whose father or mother is a Canadian citizen and has received primary instruction in English in Canada, provided that this instruction constitutes the major part of the primary instruction received in Canada;	1° children whose father or mother is a Canadian citizen and has received primary instruction in English in Canada, provided that this instruction constitutes the major part of the primary instruction received in Canada;
2° children whose father or mother is a Canadian citizen and who have received or are receiving primary or secondary instruction in English in Canada, as well as their brothers and sisters, provided that this instruction constitutes the major part of the primary or secondary instruction received in Canada;	2° children whose father or mother is a Canadian citizen and who have received or are receiving primary or secondary instruction in English in Canada, as well as their brothers and sisters, provided that this instruction constitutes the major part of the primary or secondary instruction received in Canada;
3° children whose father and mother are not Canadian citizens but one of whom has received primary instruction in English in Quebec, provided that this instruction constitutes the major part of the primary instruction received in Quebec;	3° children whose father and mother are not Canadian citizens but one of whom has received primary instruction in English in Quebec, provided that this instruction constitutes the major part of the primary instruction received in Quebec;
4° children who, during their last year of schooling in Quebec before August 26, 1977, were receiving instruction in English in a public kindergarten class or in an elementary or secondary school, as well as their brothers and sisters;	4° children who, during their last year of schooling in Quebec before August 26, 1977, were receiving instruction in English in a public kindergarten class or in an elementary or secondary school, as well as their brothers and sisters;
5° children whose father or mother resided in Quebec as of August 26, 1977, and had received primary instruction in English outside Quebec, provided that this instruction constitutes the major part of the primary instruction received outside Quebec.	5° children whose father or mother resided in Quebec as of August 26, 1977, and had received primary instruction in English outside Quebec, provided that this instruction constitutes the major part of the primary instruction received outside Quebec.
	However, instruction in English received in Quebec at a private educational institution not accredited for subsidy purposes by the child for whom the application is made, or by one of his or her siblings, is not taken into account. The same applies to instruction in English received in Quebec in such institutions, after October 1, 2002, by the child's father or mother. Nor is instruction in English received under a special authorization granted under sections 81, 85 or 85.1 taken into account.

==== Unconstitutionality ====
On October 22, 2009, the Supreme Court of Canada ruled on the constitutionality of the Charter amendment in Bill 104. The decision, Nguyen v. Quebec, ordered the Quebec government to amend this section so that attendance in a non-subsidized English school would not automatically disqualify a student from attending a subsidized school.

According to the Court, Section 23 of the Canadian Charter of Rights and Freedoms obliges Quebec to offer primary and secondary education in English to the English-speaking minority. To do so, the government must analyze each child's background to determine whether or not the child should have access to such a school. By systematically excluding the child's experience at an unsubsidized school from the analysis, the Quebec government would not be carrying out a complete analysis of the child's background.

The Court's decision was largely based on its earlier ruling in Solski v. Quebec. In that case, the Court had ruled that it was constitutional for Quebec to require that children spend the "major part" of their lives in English school before granting access, but that this "major part" analysis should not be limited to a quantitative analysis. The government had to take into account the child's entire background to determine whether or not they would have access to the subsidized English school.

These two Supreme Court rulings developed the doctrine of the genuine educational pathway. This doctrine obliges the government to analyze a student's background, to see whether the child attended an unsubsidized English-language school simply to get around the law, or whether the student had a genuine educational background aimed at becoming part of the English-speaking minority.

==== The government's reaction ====
Apart from certain English-speaking groups, most Quebec political players were shocked by the Supreme Court's decision. Christine St-Pierre, the Minister responsible for the application of the Charter of the French Language, said she was disappointed by the decision, but announced her intention to work to bring the Charter of the French Language into line with the Supreme Court's decision.

In June 2010, the Charest government announced its response to the Nguyen v. Québec decision. The government presented the Act to amend the Charter of the French language and other legislative provisions (Bill 103) to the National Assembly. This bill included several measures, the main one being the introduction of a rubric to evaluate a child's authentic schooling. In addition to children who already had access to subsidized English schools (see the section on Subsidized English Schools above), the rubric would be used to determine whether or not other children should have access to subsidized English schools. If these children demonstrated a genuine academic pathway to study in English, the government would allow them access to the subsidized English school.

Bill 103 included several other measures, including the addition of three sections to the Charter of Human Rights and Freedoms. The purpose of these sections was to "enshrine the importance of French, the official language of Quebec".

Before Bill 103 was passed, however, the government decided to abandon it and introduce a more succinct bill, in response to court rulings on language of instruction (Bill 115). This bill included only the introduction of the evaluation rubric for authentic schooling. The bill also set out certain penalties for schools using means to circumvent the Charter of the French Language. The government introduced this bill four days before the end of the deadline given by the Supreme Court to amend the Charter of the French Language. The government therefore used the cloture order procedure to limit parliamentary debate on the bill. Bill 115 was passed on October 19, 2010.

Law 115 led to a reappearance of the transfer of children from unsubsidized private schools to the subsidized network.

=== Creation of the Office québécois de la langue française ===
==== Modifications ====
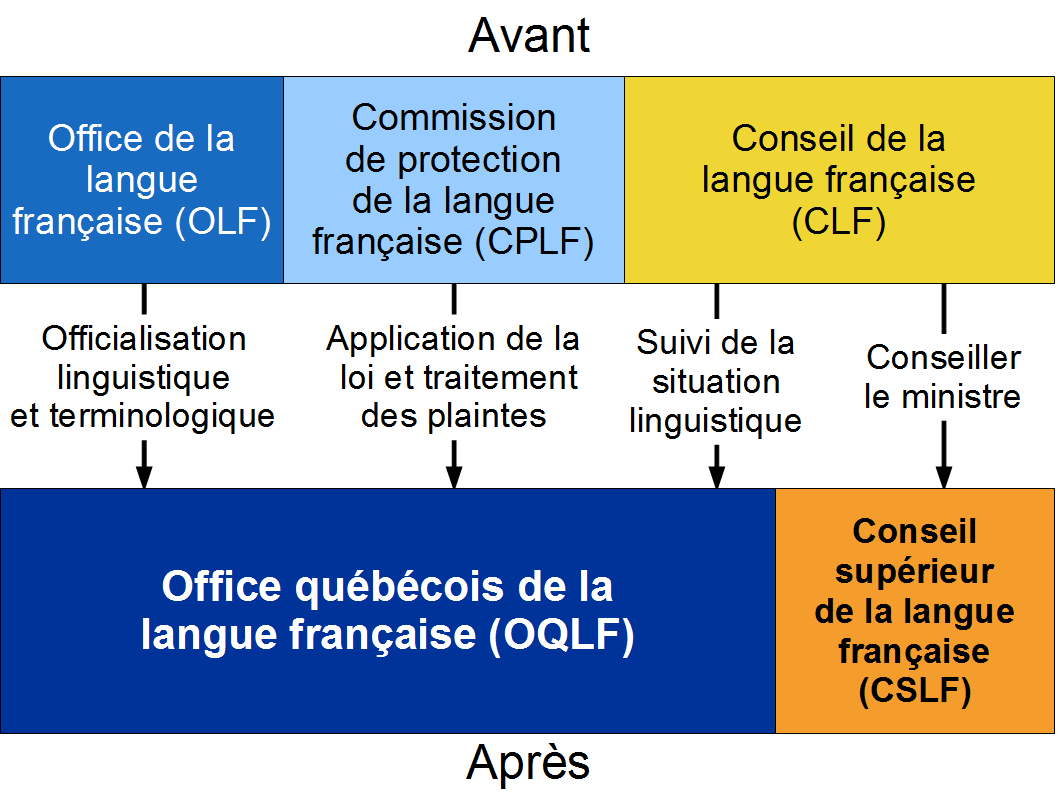
Diagram illustrating the transfer of responsibilities following Bill 104.

The law reorganized the institutions involved in Quebec's language policy. Two organizations were created when the law came into force (October 1, 2002): the Office québécois de la langue française (OQLF) and the Conseil supérieur de la langue française (CSF). The OQLF is the result of a merger between the Office de la langue française (OLF) and the Commission de la protection de la langue française (CPLF). The Conseil supérieur de la langue française is the successor to the Conseil de la langue française (CLF).

The Minister's objective with this reform is to enable the Office "to have an overall vision of language issues in Quebec". According to Diane Lemieux, the reform will clarify the mandate of each organization and ensure greater consistency in action. In fact, the OQLF becomes the main body responsible for applying the Charter of the French Language.

More concretely, the OQLF inherits three main areas of activity. Firstly, it is responsible for monitoring the linguistic situation in Quebec. This was formerly the mandate of the Conseil de la langue française (CLF). Secondly, it inherits the function of linguistic and terminological formalization formerly attributed to the Office de la langue française. This service function includes the Grand dictionnaire terminologique and the Banque de dépannage linguistique. Finally, the OQLF has been assigned law enforcement functions, including the handling of complaints and the francization of workplaces. These two responsibilities were previously assigned to the Commission de la protection de la langue française (CPLF). Two committees were formed to fulfill these mandates: the Comité d'officialisation linguistique and the Comité de suivi de la situation linguistique.

For its part, the Conseil de la langue française (CLF) becomes the Conseil supérieur de la langue française (CSLF), but loses responsibility for monitoring the linguistic situation, which is assigned to the OQLF. The Conseil supérieur thus becomes an advisory body to the minister responsible for applying the Charter of the French Language.

==== Criticism ====
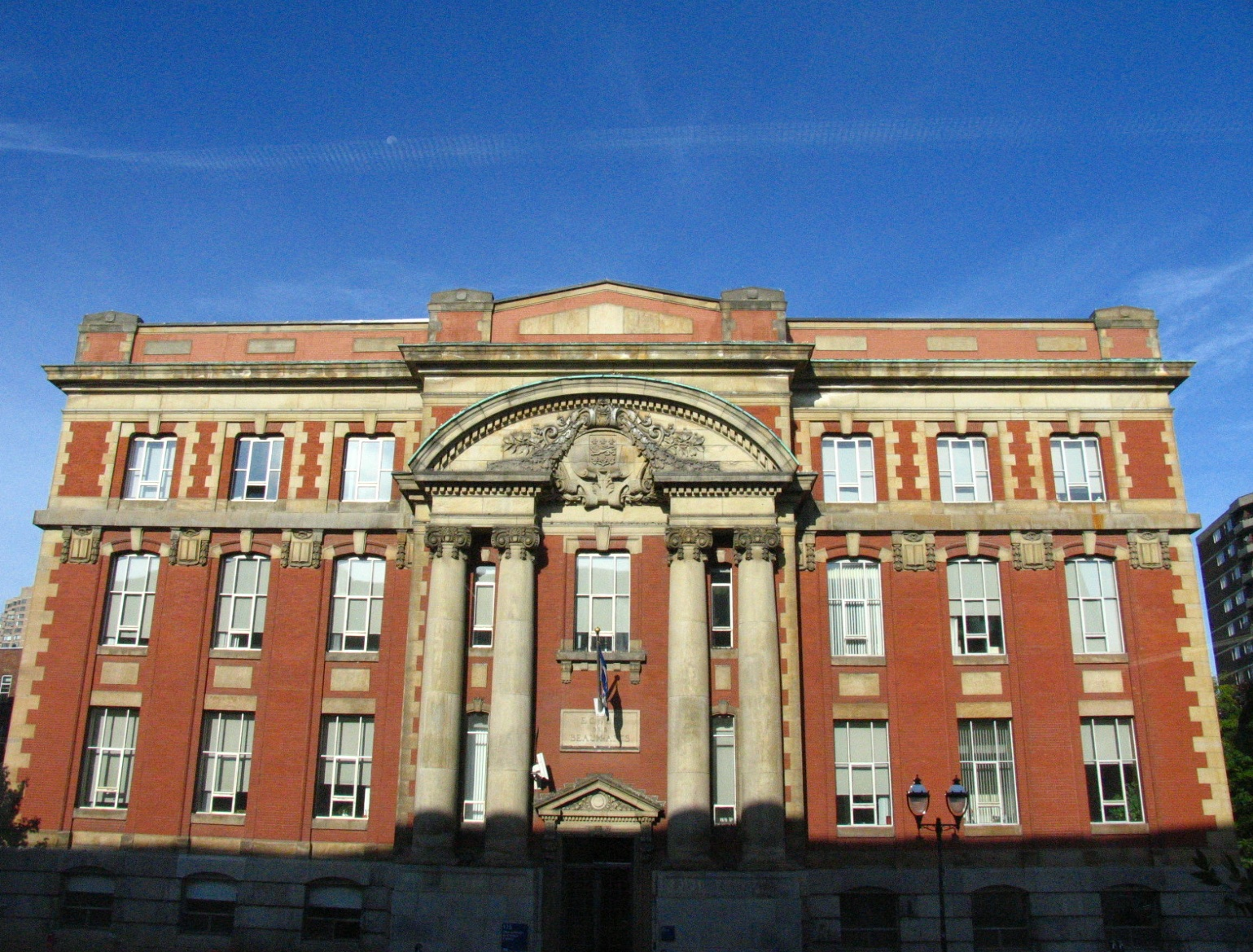
Camille-Laurin Building, headquarters of the Office québécois de la langue française, in Montreal.

At the time, this reorganization drew criticism from the Liberal Party. Official Opposition spokesman on the Charter of the French Language, Pierre-Étienne Laporte, pointed out that the missions of monitoring the linguistic situation and implementing policies would be carried out by the same organization, the OQLF. In his view, this would create a flagrant conflict of interest: "How can an Office, which is responsible for operations, reliably and objectively make judgments on the results of its own operations?

The Liberal opposition was supported by several civil society defenders of the French language. Sociologist Guy Rocher criticized the government for removing the research mandate from the Conseil de la langue française. In his view, this change would prevent the council from playing its critical role. In addition, Rocher denounced the conflict of interest created within the Office and the influence that the Minister will be able to exert, losing the independence that the Conseil de la langue française had. Guy Rocher's position was supported by Le Devoir columnist Michel David and civil society groups including the Mouvement national des Québécoises et Québécois (MNQ), the Fédération des travailleurs et travailleuses du Québec (FTQ), the Confédération des syndicats nationaux (CSN) and the Syndicat des professionnelles et professionnels du gouvernement du Québec (SPPGQ).

The Conseil de la langue française also opposed the changes to the mandates, in particular the reduction of the research mandate and the merger of the "services" and "coercive" functions within the OQLF.

The report of the Estates General on the French language proposed such a grouping, but with the preservation of a sociolinguistic observatory responsible for monitoring the situation of the language and the public policies in place.

==== The Toponymy Commission of Quebec ====
In the original bill presented by Diane Lemieux, the merger leading to the Office québécois de la langue française also included the Commission de toponymie du Québec. This suggestion came from the report of the Estates General. However, the commission was left out of the merger in the final draft, in part because of the many criticisms it received. A number of personalities involved in Quebec toponymy argued that the commission's operations were a model on the international stage, notably because of its great independence. A number of toponymists, including geographer Jean-Marie Dubois, were at a loss to understand the reasons for changing the organization of an institution that, in their view, was working very well.

=== Linguistic policy ===
The law creates an obligation for Quebec colleges and universities to adopt a language policy. The Minister's objective was for institutions to "play an active role in the use of the French language."55 Institutions thus had until October 1, 2004 to adopt a policy dealing with elements such as the language of instruction, the language used in communications or the language of work. For their part, English-language institutions were also required to adopt such a policy, but it could only deal with the teaching of French as a second language and communication with organizations outside the institution.

This change was supported by the Conférence des recteurs et des principaux des universités du Québec (CREPUQ) and the Fédération des cégeps.

=== Language in the public sector ===
Comparison between two versions of article 16
Current text (1993-...)	Text as amended by bill 104
16. In its written communications with other governments and with legal persons established in Québec, the Authority uses the official language.	16. In its written communications with other governments and with legal persons established in Québec, the Administration uses only the official language.; However, the government may determine, by regulation, the cases, conditions or circumstances in which another language may be used in addition to the official language.

The first section of Bill 104 was designed to amend section 16 of the Charter of the French Language, so that Quebec's public administration would express itself "solely" in French with other governments and juridical persons. The purpose of adding the word " only" to the Charter was to prohibit government officials from sometimes using English to communicate with Quebec companies. This term was removed when the Bourassa government passed Bill 86 in 1993.

However, although the reinstatement of the word "only" was adopted at the same time as the rest of Bill 104, the same bill left it up to the government to decide when this amendment would come into force. Since the government never decided when the amendment would come into force, section 16 of the Charter has remained unchanged until now. This situation was denounced by the Mouvement Montréal français, which in 2007 asked Minister Christine St-Pierre to implement the amendment. The amendment did, however, allow the government to issue exceptions to this general rule.

=== Language in the workplace ===
The Act also amends a number of provisions of the Charter of the French Language concerning the francization of Quebec companies. Under the Charter, companies with 50 or more employees must have a francization certificate from the Office québécois de la langue française. The law reduces the time required to register with the Office and to produce, if necessary, a "francization plan". The total period is now one year, compared with the previous two years. The Liberal spokesman criticized this measure, pointing out that it's not just by reducing the deadline that companies will automatically be able to produce the plans more quickly.

Francization committees, already in place in companies with 100 or more employees, are now made up of equal numbers of employer and employee representatives. In addition, the Office can now require such a committee for companies with 50 to 99 employees, if necessary. The law also provides protection for employees who take part in such committees, notably against wage cuts or any form of discrimination by the employer.

These amendments represented compromises between union and employer positions on the francization of businesses. During consultations on the bill, business groups had expressed their disappointment that the government was using coercion, rather than incentives, to francize companies. In addition, the Conseil québécois du commerce de détail (CQDC) was dissatisfied with the reduction in the deadline for producing a francization plan. Union groups were satisfied with the measures, but criticized the government for not doing more about organizational support for francization committees and companies with fewer than 50 employees. They would have liked the Charter of the French Language to include measures to francize these small businesses.

== See also ==
- Charter of the French Language
- Conseil supérieur de la langue française (Quebec)
- Office québécois de la langue française

== Bibliography ==
Periodical articles and parliamentary debates have been cited in footnotes and do not appear in the bibliography.

=== Bills ===
- Charte de la langue française (C-11) (in French). Canada, Quebec. April 1, 2010.
- Chap. 28, Loi modifiant la Charte de la langue française (PDF). Canada, Quebec. 2002.

=== Court decisions ===
- Cour suprême du Canada. Nguyen c. Québec (Éducation, Loisir et Sport) (In French), 2009 CSC 47, October 22, 2009.
- Cour suprême du Canada. Solski (Tuteur de) c. Québec (Procureur général) (In French), 2005 CSC 14, March 31, 2005.

=== Governmental documents ===
- Estates-General on the Situation and Future of the French Language in Quebec (August 20, 2001). Le français, une langue pour tout le monde : une nouvelle approche stratégique et citoyenne (PDF) (in French). Gouvernement du Québec. ISBN 2-550-37925-X. OCLC 48129901. Archived from the original (PDF) on July 18, 2011.
- Conseil supérieur de la langue française (2010). Avis sur l'accès anglaise à la suite du jugement de la Cour suprême du 22 octobre 2009 (PDF) (in French). Conseil supérieur de la langue française. Archived from the original (PDF) on 2022-01-08.

=== Monographs ===
- Corbeil, Jean-Claude (2007). L'embarras des langues : Origine, conception et évolution de la politique linguistique québécoise (in French). Montreal: Québec Amérique. OCLC 122707229.
- Mandel, Michael (1996). La Charte des droits et libertés et la judiciarisation du politique au Canada, Montréal (in French). Éditions du Boréal. OCLC 35886883.

=== Websites ===
- Ministère de l'Éducation et de l'Enseignement supérieur (2019). "Admissibilité à l'enseignement en anglais". Gouvernement du Québec (in French). Archived from the original on 2023-10-04.
- Mirza, Ahsan (October 26, 2009). "Nguyen v. Quebec and Suspended Declarations of Constitutional Invalidity". The Court, Osgoode Hall Law School (in French).
