= Bill 178 =

A few days after the Supreme Court of Canada delivered its ruling in the 1988 case of Ford v. Quebec (Attorney General), a decision which approved multilingual commercial expression, the Parti libéral du Québec (PLQ) government of premier Robert Bourassa amended Bill 101 with Bill 178. This latter Act maintained French as the only language on outdoor "public signs, posters and commercial advertising" and within shopping centres and the public transit system. The only exceptions were "foreign-language" signs indoors, subject to approval by the Office de la langue française, and advertisements carried in non-French media, such as the Montreal Gazette.

To override the Supreme Court's ruling, Bourassa invoked the notwithstanding clause of the Quebec and Canadian Charter of Rights and Freedoms.

In June 1993, the PLQ changed the Charter of the French Language again with Bill 86, which allowed bilingual outdoor signs provided French was predominant.

The Supreme Court's decision was jeered by Quebec nationalists and applauded by Anglo rights activists. Since then, the bilingualism debate has periodically reared its head, from debates over the amount of English spoken in downtown stores to the Italian menu flash-in-the-pan called Pastagate.
