= Act 115 =

Quebec language instruction act

Act following court rulings on language of instruction

39th Quebec Legislature
- Long title: Act following court rulings on language of instruction
- Citation: https://www.publicationsduquebec.gouv.qc.ca/fileadmin/Fichiers_client/lois_et_reglements/LoisAnnuelles/fr/2010/2010C23F.PDF
- Commenced: October 2010
- Status: Current legislation

The Act to implement court rulings on the language of instruction, commonly known as Act 115, is an amending act introduced by the Charest government in Quebec. (Note: An amending act is an act that modifies another existing act. In this case, the Act amends four existing acts: the Charter of the French Language (R.S.Q., chapter C-11), the Act respecting private education (R.S.Q., chapter E-9.1), the Act respecting the Government and Public Employees Retirement Plan (R.S.Q., chapter R-10) and the Act respecting the Pension Plan for Management Personnel (R.S.Q., chapter R-12.1).) (Note: The term "Bill 115" refers to the 115th act tabled by the government during a parliamentary session (the 1st session of the 39th legislature). There have been several "Act 115s" in Quebec's history, since the countdown starts at 1 for each parliamentary session.) This legislation modifies the Charter of the French Language in response to the Supreme Court of Canada's ruling in Nguyen v. Quebec.

Act 115 assigns the responsibility to the Conseil des ministres to define the conditions under which a child may access subsidized English-language schools in Quebec, with the primary criterion being attendance at an unsubsidized English-language school for three years or more.

== Bill ==
The bill was presented in the Quebec National Assembly on October 18, 2010, by Christine St-Pierre, the Minister responsible for the application of the Charter of the French Language. The government employed a gag order procedure, which allowed for the expedited passage of the bill by limiting debate within the Assembly. Consequently, the act was passed the following day, on October 19, 2010.

== Background and consequences ==
In 2002, Bernard Landry's Parti Québécois government passed Bill 104 to address the issue of bridge schools, which are private English-language schools that are not subsidized and thus fall outside the provisions of Bill 101. This allows Francophone or allophone parents to enroll their children in a bridge school during their first year of primary education, granting them the right to transition to a public English-language school—available at no cost—starting in the second year and continuing through their education. The law faced immediate legal challenges; the Quebec Court of Appeal declared it unconstitutional, leading the Quebec government to appeal to the Supreme Court.

In 2009, in the case of Nguyen v. Québec, the Supreme Court acknowledged that parents using bridge schools were deliberately attempting to circumvent Bill 101. However, the Court struck down Bill 104 as excessive, emphasizing that each child's "authentic educational path" must be considered. This ruling led to significant public outcry in Quebec, with various parties, including the Parti Québécois and the Mouvement national des Québécois, along with several columnists, calling for the government to invoke the "notwithstanding clause" of the Canadian Charter of Rights and Freedoms. This clause permits a provincial government to bypass obligations imposed by the Charter as determined by the Supreme Court. The Charest government declined to pursue this option, primarily to maintain support from its English-speaking electorate, which opposed such measures. Instead, a multi-criteria evaluation framework was established, culminating in the enactment of Act 115, which introduced new regulations. The key criterion mandated that a child must attend an unsubsidized English-language school for three years, rather than just one.

Before the passage of Bill 104, approximately 1,100 cases per year involved children not receiving appropriate educational placements under Bill 101. Following the adoption of Act 115 in 2012, this number significantly decreased to around thirty cases.

== Adoption ==
The act was initially introduced as "An Act to amend the Charter of the French Language and other legislative provisions" (Bill 103). However, due to concerns that the debates were prolonging the process, the government decided to withdraw this bill and introduce the more concise Act 115.

Act 115 was ultimately passed by the National Assembly on October 19, 2010, with a vote of 60 to 48.

== See also ==
- Bill 104
- Language policy
- Education in Quebec
