= Diane Lemieux =

Canadian politician

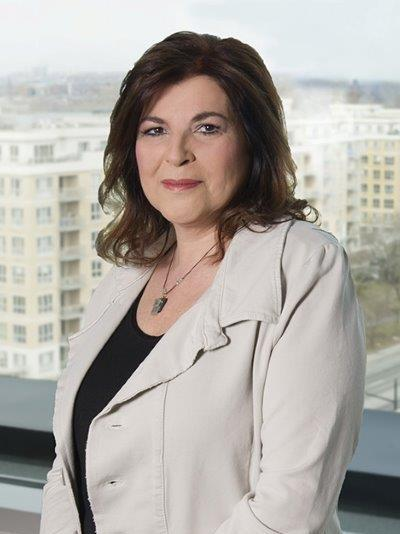
- Lemieux in June 2017
- Born: September 22, 1961 (age 64); Sherbrooke, Quebec, Canada
- Occupations: President and Chief Executive Officer of the Commission de la construction du Québec
- Notable work: Member of the Assemblée nationale du Québec (National Assembly of Quebec) (1998-2007), Engagement for women’s rights.

Diane Lemieux (born September 22, 1961) is a Canadian politician and administrator who serves as the president and chief executive officer of the Commission de la construction du Québec.

Her early activist experiences involved advocating for women's rights, first for sexual assault victims, then in her role as president of the Conseil du statut de la femme (1996-1998). Following that, she was a member of the Assemblée nationale du Québec (National Assembly of Quebec) (1998-2007) for nearly 10 years, under the governments of Lucien Bouchard and Bernard Landry.

She left political life for a brief stint in the private sector. After a year with Vision Globale, she returned to public service as the director of the Office of the Mayor and president of the executive committee of the city of Montreal.

In 2011, she stepped down from this position and became the president and chief executive officer of the Commission de la construction du Québec (CCQ).

== Biography ==
After graduating from the Faculty of Law of the Université de Sherbrooke in 1983, she began her professional life, first through a social commitment to women's issues, with a particular focus on sexual assault victims. From 1986 to 1996, she was the coordinator and spokesperson for the Centres d’aide et de lutte contre les aggressions à caractère sexuel (CALACS) (Quebec Coalition of Sexual Assault Centres).

She was the chairperson of the Sexual Assault Task Force from 1994 to 1995 and instigated a large research project on the legal treatment reserved for sexually assaulted women. She received Quebec's Prix de la justice award in 1991 for this research.

In 1996, she became the youngest woman to chair Conseil du statut de la femme. She held this position until 1998, when she was elected in the Montreal riding of Bourget for the Parti Québécois. She was reelected in 2003 and 2007.

Diane Lemieux was a member of the Assemblée nationale du Québec (National Assembly of Quebec) for nearly 10 years. First, under Lucien Bouchard's government, she was the minister of state for Labour and Employment from 1998 to 2001. Under Bernard Landry, she held the position of minister of state for Culture and Communications from 2001 to 2003. During this mandate, she asked the National Assembly to adopt Bill 104, an Act to amend the Charter of the French Language.

Following the election of Jean Charest's government in 2003, she sat in the opposition as chairperson of the Committee on Economy and Labour from 2003 to 2004. She became the first woman to hold the position of parliamentary leader of the official opposition from 2004 to 2007. She ended her political career as an MNA as the house leader of the second opposition group after the elections of 2007.

In 2008, she worked in the private sector, where she became vice president for business development at Vision Globale, a Quebec company in the film and TV industry. A year later, she returned to public service, joining the ranks of Union Montréal, the political party of the mayor in office, Gérald Tremblay. She ran for borough councillor in Ahuntsic-Cartierville, but her bid was unsuccessful. She then held the position of director of the Office of the Mayor and president of the executive committee of the city of Montreal.

In 2011, she became the first woman to hold the position of president and chief executive officer of the Commission de la construction du Québec (CCQ) . In November 2015, her mandate was renewed until 2021.

Diane Lemieux arrived at the CCQ at a time of turmoil. The CCQ was on the verge of two major interventions: the abolition of union hiring and the establishment of a commission of inquiry into the construction industry. She worked to improve the integrity of the organization with an eye to contributing to the stability of the entire industry, which she explained during her testimony at the Commission sur l'octroi et la gestion des contrats publics dans l'industrie de la construction (Commission of Inquiry on the Awarding and Management of Public Contracts in the Construction Industry).

In June 2012, the 600 administrative employees of the CCQ represented by the Syndicat des employés professionnels et de bureau (SEPB-Québec), who had been without a collective agreement since December 2009, went on strike. The strike lasted a little over two months. The employees were back to work on August 8, 2012 after signing a tentative agreement.

In the first year of her mandate, following Bill 15 (Anti-Corruption Act), employees with investigative powers in the Commission de la construction du Québec had to be disaffiliated from the Syndicat des employés professionnels et de bureau (SEPB-Québec), affiliated to a trade union representing construction workers. This act amended section 65 of Act R-20, a change whose goal was to avoid any appearance of conflict of interest.

Diane Lemieux declared that this initiative was "unusual but necessary, in order to establish – or rather re-establish – the CCQ’s credibility and integrity". Employees and executives with investigative powers have considerable authority; they can, among other things, freely access all construction sites in Quebec and require any construction company to produce documents. Now affiliated with the Syndicat du personnel d’enquête de la Commission de la construction du Québec (SPECCQ), these employees signed their first collective agreement on October 30, 2014.

As head of the CCQ, Diane Lemieux took on two important issues for the future of the industry which had not seen much progress until then: access for women to construction trades and the fight against intimidation on construction sites.

Under her leadership, the CCQ has seen many changes, notably the establishment of the Carnet référence construction (to replace union hiring) and revised investigative methods.

Diane Lemieux is also active in her immediate environment and in the business sector. She is a member of the board of directors of the Caisse de dépôt et placement du Québec and chairs the board of directors of TOHU.

== Awards and distinctions ==
- 1991: The Mérite Estrien award offered by Sherbrooke's newspaper La Tribune
- 1991: Québec's Prix de la Justice award
- 1991 and 1996: Personality of the Week award from the newspaper La Presse
- 1997: Ambassador for the Fondation and Réseau of the Université de Sherbrooke
- 2015: IPSOS-ICO award – public sector figure who made the biggest contribution to improving the public's trust
- 2016: Honorary award from the Elles de la construction
- 2016: Femmes d’affaires du Québec award – Executive, manager or professional in a public or semi-public organization – Videotron Business Solutions Award

== See also ==
- 37th Quebec Legislature
- 38th Quebec Legislature
- Gouvernment of Bernard Landry
- Gouvernement of Lucien Bouchard
- Bill 104
- Parti Québécois
- Commission de la construction du Québec
