= Estates-General on the Situation and Future of the French Language in Quebec =

The Estates-General on the Situation and Future of the French Language in Quebec is the name of a commission set up by the government of Quebec on June 29, 2000. The mandate which the government gave to the commission:

"to identify and analyze the principal factors which influence the situation and the future of the French language in Quebec, to identify the prospects and the relevant priorities of action, to carry out the examination of the articles of the Charter of the French language concerned and, finally, to present recommendations aiming at ensuring the use, the radiation and the quality of the French language in Quebec."

== Commission ==
The commission, presided over by Gérald Larose, counted 10 commissaries:

- Jean-Claude Corbeil (also secretary)
- Josée Bouchard
- Hélène Cajolet-Laganière
- Stéphane Éthier
- Patricia Lemay
- Norma Lopez-Therrien
- Stanley Péan
- Gary Richards
- Marie-Claude Sarrazin
- Dermod Travis

== Consultation ==
Between November 2000 and June 2001, the commission responsible for the organization of the Estates-General held public consultations. Some 300 organizations, experts and citizens submitted their opinions in writing or in person during the hearings. Were also organized six special days, an international conference entitled "Cultural diversity and linguistic policies in the word" held at Université Laval and a national forum held in Quebec City.

== Report ==
The final report of 298 pages, submitted to the government on August 17, 2001, is entitled Le français, une langue pour tout le monde (French, a language for everyone). Its recommendations, 149 in total, are grouped under eight chapters whose names translate to:

- Chapter 1 – For a global and citizen language policy
- Chapter 2 – Conferring a constitutional character to the founding principles of the language policy
- Chapter 3 – To insure the command of French within the context of a plural language planning
- Chapter 4 – For a vast language planning endeavour binding language status and language quality
- Chapter 5 – French, an everyday language
- Chapter 6 – French and new technologies
- Chapter 7 – Francophone and international solidarity
- Chapter 8 – Deploying the global policy

Chapter 1's eleven recommendations are that a true Quebec citizenship be created, learning French be declared a fundamental right of Quebecers as a consequence of its being the language of citizenship, Quebec acquires complete jurisdiction over the selection of immigrants, and obstacles to immigration resulting from the non-recognition of foreign diplomas be removed.

The three recommendations of chapter 2 are that key dispositions of the Charter of the French language be constitutionalized.

Chapter 3's forty-eight recommendations pertain to the improvement of the teaching of French at all levels in the French-language school network, the English-language school network.

The recommendations of chapter 4 pertain to the promotion of Quebec's own normative French.

Chapter 5 pertains to French in the workplace, in trade and on the consumer market. To insure the right of workers to carry out their activities in French, the commission's recommendations are that francization efforts be carried out through a sectoral approach in addition to the existing company-by-company approach. The sectoral approach should target companies of all sizes as well as self-employed individuals. It is recommended that the federal government of Canada should take the appropriate measures so that corporations operating under its jurisdiction start respecting the right of Quebec workers relative to language, and in general respect Quebec's language policy.

In the public sector, the recommendations are that the principles of the government's policy relative to the use and the quality of French apply at all levels of the public administration, i.e., municipalities, school boards, colleges, universities, health and other social services. The commission recommends that steps be taken to reform international conventions on trademarks and federal legislation on business incorporation so that the national languages, cultural and linguistic diversity of countries be better respected. In the meantime, the Quebec government, through the organization responsible for the administration of the Charter of the French language, should deploy a proactive strategy to encourage businesses operating in Quebec to give themselves a name respectful of Quebec's distinctiveness relative to language. Municipalities should participate in this effort.

Regarding the language of public signs and advertising, the recommendations are that the principle of "marked predominance" of French be applied without ambiguity, with only certain exceptions such as advertising destined to an international public whose participants are a majority to come from outside Quebec (such as festivals). The federal government of Canada should also respect the principle of "marked predominance" which the Supreme Court of Canada originally suggested.

Chapter 6's twelve recommendations pertain to French and new technologies.

Chapter 7 concerns international and francophone solidarity. It is recommendation by the commission that Quebec develops more direct relations with the Acadians, French Canadians and French Americans, that it plays a greater role as part of the Organisation internationale de la Francophonie where it is officially represented, that it defends the place of French in the proposed Free Trade Area of the Americas, and defends language diversity worldwide through its diplomatic network.

The recommendations of chapter 8 pertains to a proposed reorganization of the institutions responsible to carry out Quebec's language policy. The commission recommends the merger of the Office de la langue française, the Conseil de la langue française, the Commission de protection de la langue française and the Commission de toponymie into a single entity, that the Court of Quebec should include a tribunal dedicated to cases relative to the violation of the Charter of the French language, the creation of an observatory on the sociolinguistic situation of Quebec, the creation of media watch to follow what is being written and said on Quebec's language policy abroad.

== See also ==
- Charter of the French Language
- Office de la langue française
- Bill 104, Quebec
