= Override clause (Israel) =

Proposed Israeli legislation

Override clause (Hebrew: פסקת התגברות) is a proposed Israeli law which would give the Knesset the power to override the Basic Laws and the rulings of the Supreme Court. It was a key issue on the agenda of the 37th Israeli government.

The law would give the Knesset the right to re-enact, by a simple majority, a law declared unconstitutional by the Supreme Court. Some of the drafts of this law would also enable the Knesset to preemptively shield laws from judicial review.

The proposed override clause has been criticized for limiting the constitutional review powers of the Supreme Court, thus removing the checks and balances on the power of the majority, which would endanger human rights and the rights of minorities. According to the Israel Democracy Institute, the Supreme Court has used its constitutional review power with restraint.

According to its supporters, the override clause would prevent overreach by the Supreme Court. They say that in Israel, unlike other countries where constitutional review is practiced, the Supreme Court judges are not appointed by elected bodies and therefore the powers of the Supreme Court need to be limited.

In June 2023, Prime Minister Benjamin Netanyahu publicly stated that the override clause would no longer be part of his government’s judicial overhaul plan. In an interview with the Wall Street Journal, Netanyahu said that the highly contested provision was "thrown out" and would not advance in its originally proposed form, even as other elements of judicial reform continued to be pursued. Some coalition partners, including hard-line figures, reacted with criticism, and debate has continued over alternative mechanisms for judicial change.

In March 2025, the Knesset passed legislation increasing political influence over the appointment of judges, as part of the government’s broader judicial reform agenda. Although the law did not introduce an override clause per se, it was widely described as advancing the same overall objective of shifting authority from the judiciary to the elected branches of government. Critics argued that the measure weakened judicial independence and undermined checks and balances, while supporters said it enhanced democratic accountability.

== See also ==
- Parliamentary sovereignty
- Section 33 of the Canadian Charter of Rights and Freedoms
- 2023 Israeli judicial reform
- 2023 Israeli judicial reform protests
