= Commission de la construction du Québec =

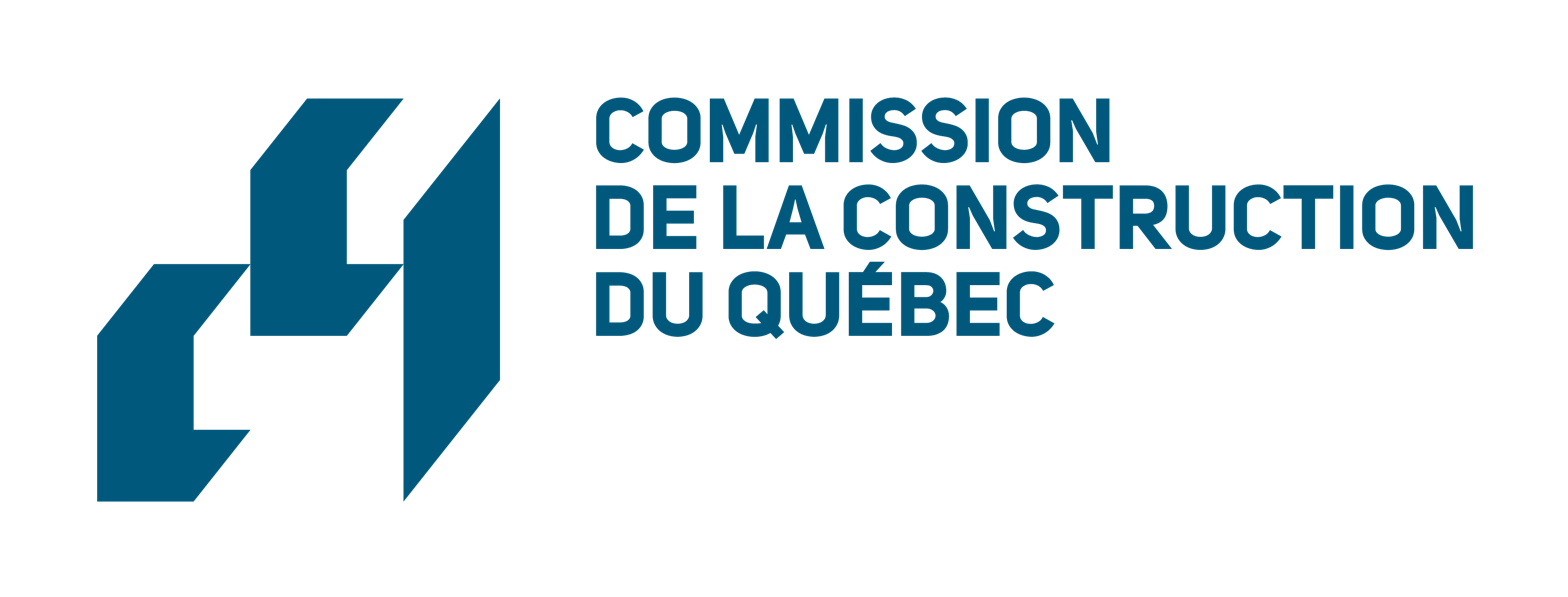
- Industry: Construction
- Founded: 1987
- Headquarters: Montreal, Quebec, Canada
- Key people: Diane Lemieux, president and chief executive officer
- Revenue: $100 million
- Number of employees: 1080 (in 2015)
- Website: www.ccq.org/en

The Commission de la construction du Québec (CCQ) (English: Quebec Construction Commission) is responsible for the application of the laws and regulations that govern the construction industry in the province of Quebec. Funded by the industry's employers and employees, the CCQ offers numerous services in the areas of social services, vocational training, workforce management, and application of the construction industry's collective agreements.

== Description ==
The Commission de la construction du Québec, created in 1987, is responsible for application of the Act Respecting Labour Relations, Vocational Training, and Workforce Management in the Construction Industry (Act R-20), which governs the industry. It is funded mainly by payroll deductions made from employees and employers in the construction industry.

The CCQ's purpose is to offer numerous services to its clientele, notably in terms of social benefits, pension, and insurance plans; vocational training; and management of the industry's workforce. It is also responsible for applying the construction industry's collective agreements.

The construction industry is a major economic driver in Quebec, drawing tens of billions of dollars in investments annually. The industry includes hundreds of thousands of workers and numerous firms that frequently relocate across the province to complete various infrastructure and development projects.

== Mission ==
The CCQ the organization to which the government of Québec has entrusted the responsibility to implement the Act Respecting Labour Relations, Vocational Training and Workforce Management in the Construction Industry (Act R-20) and the associated regulations.

As the organization that serves workers and employers in the construction industry and is responsible for administering the programs intended for them, the CCQ must:

- Administer the negotiated social benefit in the sectorial collective agreements and ensure their development
- Administer the funds entrusted to it in such a way as to foster the perpetuation of the programs that they support
- Satisfy the needs of the workers and maintain their skills at a high level
- Offer a referral service for workers

As the organization that ensures compliance in the construction industry, the CCQ must:

- Ensure the compliance with the sectorial collective agreements for workers in the construction industry under Act R-20 and its regulations
- Fight undeclared work to foster fair competition among the industry's contractors
- Contribute to the prevention of and the fight against corruption and for the application of tax laws in the construction industry

The CCQ must thus carry out a mission with two separate components, reflecting the evolution of the Quebec legislative framework regarding the construction industry.

=== Competency certificate ===
The competency certificate is the main instrument that grants the right to work on the basis of training or experience acquired for a given occupation or trade. In fact, the CCQ verifies employees' skill before allowing them the right to work.

There are three categories of competency certificate:

1. The journeyman competency certificate is for those who have demonstrated their qualifications in one of the construction trades.
2. The apprentice competency certificate is for those in apprenticeship for a given trade (depending on the trade, the certificate requires that apprentices complete from one to five periods of 2000 hours each).
3. The occupation competency certificate is for those working on construction sites as labourers or general helpers.

=== Workforce management ===
The CCQ has the mandate of ensuring a balance between the demand for labour and the availability of qualified workers. The CCQ manages the workforce through labour pools containing holders of competency certificates in the industry's trades and occupations. The system ensures a sufficient supply of available workers and refers them to the employers who need them. Other aspects of workforce management include the verification and the application of the regulations concerning the hiring and the mobility of workers, the making of interprovincial agreements and terms aiming to encourage worker mobility outside Québec, and the implementation of measures to ensure that workers have the needed skills that they need.

=== Construction trades ===
Trades	
Boiler maker	Interior systems installer
Bricklayer-mason	Ironworker
Carpenter-joiner	Millwright
Cement finisher	Painter
Crane operator	Pipe fitter
Electrician	Plasterer
Electrician specializing in installation of security systems	Refrigeration mechanic
Elevator mechanic	Reinforcing steel erector
Erector mechanic (glazier)	Resilient flooring layer
Fire-protection mechanic	Roofer
Heavy equipment mechanic	Shovel operator
Heavy equipment operator	Tile setter
Insulator	Tinsmith

Occupations	
Blaster-driller	Pipe welder (high pressure)
Diver	Surveyor
Lineman	Welder

=== Social benefits programs ===
The CCQ administers the complementary social benefits plans, which are notable for their diversity and variety in light of the needs of the clientele. In addition to receiving vacation cheques twice a year, the workforce benefits from private pension and insurance plans, funded entirely by employers and by people practising an occupation or a trade. People covered by the plans maintain their coverage even if they change employers or work regions.

==== Vacations ====
Twice a year, the CCQ sends workers a vacation allowance: at the end of June, for the amount credited between July and December of the previous year and at the end of November for the amount credited from January to June of the same year.

Every month, the employer remits to the CCQ the indemnities for paid statutory holidays and obligatory annual vacations set out in the collective agreements. The amount represents 13% of the salary earned by workers during each week of work:

- 6% in annual vacations
- 5.5% in paid statutory holidays
- 1.5% in sick leave

==== Construction Holiday ====
Construction Holiday was made official in 1970 by a government decree and took effect for the first time in Québec in the summer of 1971. The vacation period is one of the working conditions to which employers and workers have agreed.

It is estimated that during this part of the summer, about one quarter of Québec's labour force is on vacation. Thus, for more than 35 years, the last two full civil weeks (Sunday to Saturday) of July have marked the construction holiday. The tradition was slightly modified in 2008:

- Winter 2016–17: December 25, 2016, to January 7, 2017
- Summer 2017: July 23 to August 5, 2017

=== Powers to ensure compliance ===
One of the roles of the CCQ is to oversee the application of the collective agreements negotiated between the employer and union parties. To ensure coherent and uniform working conditions throughout Québec, the CCQ has been granted certain powers, which it exercises daily, under the Act on Labour Relations, Vocational Training, and Manpower Management in the Construction Industry (Act R-20).

The CCQ may suspend work on a construction site and claim the sums due that are established via expertise that is based on the scope of the work or by any other means or evidence.

Since 1987, criminal lawsuits have been brought by the Directeur des poursuites criminelles et pénales, and fines have been paid into the province's consolidated fund.

== History ==
In its current form, the Commission de la construction du Québec (CCQ) was founded in 1987. Its origins, however, go back to 1934: for more than 30 years (1934–68), the employers and unions in the construction industry had their agreements recognized mainly through the Act Respecting Collective Agreement Decrees. Parity committees, the ancestors of the CCQ, administered the Construction Decree on a regional basis.

In 1968, the government of Québec adopted a statute specifically for the construction industry, the Act Respecting Labour Relations, Vocational Training, and Workforce Management in the Construction Industry (Act R-20), which provided for the creation of a province-wide organization to apply the law. From 1971 to 1975, this organization was the Commission de l'industrie de la construction (CIC), which was succeeded by the Office de la construction du Québec (OCQ) from 1975 to 1986 and then, starting in 1987, by the CCQ.

== Statistics ==
The construction industry makes a significant contribution to Québec's economy. In 2014, it accounted for investments of $45.4 billion, the equivalent of 12% of the province's GDP. With an average of 234,700 direct jobs generated per month, it represents 1 job in 20 province-wide.

Activities falling under Act R-20 represent 60% of all construction activities.

Main construction industry indicators:

	2015	2014	Variation
Number of workers	153,040	158,085	–3.2%
Number of hours worked	140.4 million	149.6 million	–6.2%
Annual average hours worked per employee	917	946	–3.1%
Total payroll	$5.5 billion	$5.8 billion	–5.0%
Number of employers	25,704	25,855	–0.6%
Average hours per employer	5,461	5,787	–5.6%

Serving employers and the workforce

2015
23,050 competency certificates issued
330,962 worker turnovers (hiring or termination)
31 study programs approved by the CCQ and offered by the school system
25,154 participants in skill-upgrading programs
11,017 admissions to qualification exams to graduate from apprentice to journeyman
143,598 insured people
353,021 participants in the pension plan

== See also ==
- Diane Lemieux
