= Colin H. Williams =

British academic (1950–2026)

Colin Haslehurst Williams, FLSW (1950 – 2 May 2026) was a Welsh academic who worked as a senior research associate at the VHI, l St Edmund's College, the University of Cambridge. He had previously worked as a research professor in sociolinguistics, and later an honorary professor in the School of Welsh at Cardiff University.

== Life and career ==
Williams was born in 1950 in Barry, Vale of Glamorgan, where he attended Ysgol Gymraeg y Barri and Ysgol Uwchradd Rhydfelen (subsequently renamed) before pursuing tertiary studies at Swansea University. He graduated summa cum laude B.Sc. Econ in geography and politics in 1972. He then began his Ph.D. research on 'Language Decline and Nationalist Resurgence.' The Ph.D. was awarded by the University of Wales in 1978. In November 2017 he was awarded an honorary D.Litt. by the University of Wales.

In 1973, he gained an English Speaking Union Scholarship tenable at the Department of Geography, the University of Western Ontario, Canada, and undertook field work on the challenges facing the French language in Quebec and Acadia. Returning to Wales, he was appointed an Open University Tutor and a Demonstrator at the Department of Geography, University College of Swansea, 1974–1976, before taking up an appointment teaching in the Departments of Geography and Politics and International Relations at North Staffordshire Polytechnic, now Staffordshire University, where he was successively lecturer, principal lecturer and professor of geography. In 1993, while he was working in Toronto as a Multicultural History Society of Ontario Fellow, he was appointed a research professor, School of Welsh, Cardiff University, the post he occupied until 2015. In June 2015, he was elected a visiting fellow at St Edmund's College, University of Cambridge, where he specialised in aspects of peace and conflict, human rights and minority relations and comparative policy development in multilingual and multicultural polities. In January 2018 he was named as a senior research associate of the Von Hügel Institute, St Edmund's College, University of Cambridge, where he worked on peace and reconciliation in post-conflict societies.

His main scholarly interests are sociolinguistics and language policy in multicultural societies, ethnic and minority relations and political geography. He was a former Fulbright Scholar in Residence and visiting professor, The Department of Geography, Pennsylvania State University, 1982–83, a SSRC/SHFR Exchange Scholar (1982) and Swedish Institute Scholar (1988) at the Centre for the Study of International Conflicts, Department of History, University of Lund, and an adjunct professor of geography, University of Western Ontario, 1994. In 2002 he was a visiting fellow of Mansfield College and Jesus College, Oxford University and a visiting fellow of Mansfield College again in 2010. In 2009 he was a visiting professor at the Department of Political Science, the University of Ottawa in connection with the SSHRC sponsored ARUC project.

In April 2000 the National Assembly for Wales appointed him to be a member of the Welsh Language Board, a post he held until 2011. In May 2013 he was elected a Fellow of the Learned Society of Wales. He was an honorary professor of Celtic Studies at the University of Aberdeen, until 2009 and continued as an adjunct professor of geography at the University of Western Ontario, Canada.

He was the author/editor of numerous books, including:

- Called Unto Liberty: On Language and Nationalism Multilingual Matters, Clevedon, Avon, 1994
- The Political Geography of the New World Order, J. Wiley, London, 1993
- A Welsh Language Board sponsored project on Community Language Planning and Policy, whose first major report was published as Williams, C.H. and Evas, J.C Y Cynllun Ymchwil Cymunedol (The Community Research Project), Welsh Language Board, Cardiff, August 1997, 3rd Edition 2000
- Language Revitalization in Wales: Policy and Planning University of Wales Press, Cardiff, 2000
- Language and Governance, University of Wales Press, 2007
- Linguistic Minorities in Democratic Context, Palgrave, 2008
- Minority Language Promotion, Protection and Regulation: The Mask of Piety, Palgrave, 2013
- Co-editor with S. Pertot and T. Priestley, Rights, Promotion and Integration Issues for Minority Rights in Europe, Palgrave, 2009
- Co-editor with H.S. Thomas, Parents, Personalities and Power, University of Wales Press, 2012.
- Language Policy and the New Speaker Challenge, Cambridge University Press, 2023.
- Official Language Regimes, Palgrave/Macmillan, 2025.

He was involved in research projects comparing the office of Language Commissioner in Canada and Europe; and a study of Official Language Strategies in Canada and Europe. A later project, supported by a Leverhulme Emeritus Fellowship, investigated Official Language Regimes which compares European and Canadian cases.

Williams died on 2 May 2026, aged 75.

== Affiliations ==
Williams was a member of the scientific committee of Lingua Mon, Barcelona, 2007–2013 and of the Basque Academy's Social History of the Basque Language. He was a member of the scientific committee of Lingua Mon, Barcelona, 2007–2013 and of the Basque Academy's Social History of the Basque Language. In January 2008 he was appointed by the Government of Ireland as one of six specialists charged with preparing a 20-year strategy for the Irish language. He later advised the Government of Wales on its revised language strategy.

== Sources ==
- Language Revitalization in Wales: Policy and Planning, University of Wales Press, Cardiff. 2000.
- Language and Governance, University of Wales Press, 2007.
- Linguistic Minorities in Democratic Context, Palgrave, 2008.
- Marquis Who's Who in the World, 2008.
