= Superior Council of the French Language (Quebec) =

Governmental organisation in Quebec, Canada

The Conseil supérieur de la langue française (CSLF; English: Superior Council of the French Language) is an advisory council in Quebec, Canada, whose mission is "to advise the minister responsible for the application of the Charter of the French language on any question relative to the French language in Quebec". It works in close collaboration with equivalent bodies in France, Belgium and Switzerland.

Section 185 of the Quebec Charter of the French Language establishes a Council under the name of Conseil supérieur de la langue française. It was initially created in 1977 with the adoption of the Charter.

== Mandate ==
The mandate of the Quebec Council is to "advise the minister responsible for the application of the Charter of the French language on any question relative to the French language in Quebec."

Specifically, the Council may:

- give its opinion to the minister on any question that he or she submits;
- inform the minister on any question which the Council believes requires the attention of the government.

== Powers ==
In order to carry out its mission, the council may:

- receive and hear observations by individuals or groups;
- carry out or have someone carry out the studies and research it finds necessary.

In addition, it may inform the public on any question relative to the French language in Quebec.

== Council members ==
The Council is made up of eight members appointed by the government.

== Studies and research ==
The council has conducted many studies since 1978, most of which are available online for consultation. The studies touch various subjects from linguistic human rights, language shifts and assimilation, language planning, quality of written and spoken language, terminology, language demographics, challenges to linguistic and cultural diversity in the era of globalization etc.

== Award ==
The Council awards various prizes:

- Medal of the Ordre des francophones d'Amérique (Order of the francophones of America) — awarded since 1978
- Prix du 3 juillet 1608 (3 July 1608 Prize) — awarded since 1978
- Prix Jules-Fournier (Jules Fournier Prize) — awarded since 1981
- Prix Raymond-Charette (Raymond Charette Prize) — since 2000
- Prix Émile-Ollivier (Émile Ollivier Prize) — since 2005

== See also ==
- Académie française
