= Grand dictionnaire terminologique =

Online database of technical terms

The Grand dictionnaire terminologique (GDT, lit. 'Grand Terminological Dictionary') is an online terminological database containing nearly 3 million French, English and Latin technical terms in 200 industrial, scientific and commercial fields. Produced by the Office québécois de la langue française ('Quebec Office of the French Language'), the GDT is the result of thirty years of work by Quebec-based terminologists. It is the most complete translation resource for Canadian English-language technical terms.

The GDT is currently available as a freely-accessible web site, but previously existed in a number of formats over the years, including a dial-up service known as the Banque de terminologie du Québec (BTQ lit. 'Quebec Terminology Bank'), and a CD-ROM version.

== Quebec French ==
When translations differ between Quebec French and Standard French – for example in the expression "cerebrovascular accident", translated as accident cérébrovasculaire in Quebec French and accident vasculaire cérébral in France – the two forms are both given with a paragraph describing their origins, usage and conformity. The GDT thus allows writers to adapt their writing to suit their audience, be it North American, European or African.

== 1990 Reforms of French orthography ==
The GDT uses the 1990 Reforms of French orthography with loanwords and neologisms. It also prioritises usage of each word by its prominence in other authoritative works.
