= Ballantyne v Canada =

Ballantyne, Davidson, McIntyre v. Canada (Communications Nos. 359/1989 and 385/1989) was a case on Quebec's language law submitted in 1989 and decided by the Human Rights Committee of the United Nations in 1993.

== Facts ==
Three English-speaking Quebecers: John Ballantyne, Elizabeth Davidson, and Gordon McIntyre, who owned businesses in Sutton, Quebec and Huntingdon, Quebec, challenged sections 1, 6 and 10 of Bill No. 178 (amendments to the Charter of the French Language) enacted by the government of Quebec in 1988. They alleged to be victims of violations of articles 2, 19 (freedom of expression), 26 (ban of discrimination) and 27 (minority rights) of the International Covenant on Civil and Political Rights by the Federal Government of Canada and by the Province of Quebec, because they were forbidden to use English in advertising or in the name of their firms.

== Human Rights Committee views ==
Article 19: a violation was found, since a "state may choose one or more official languages, but it may not exclude, outside the spheres of public life, the freedom to express oneself in a language of one's choice".

Article 26: no violation found since "this prohibition applies to French speakers as well as English speakers, so that a French speaking person wishing to advertise in English, in order to reach those of his or her clientele who are English speaking, may not do so", no discrimination was found.

Article 27: HRC considered that English-speaking people in Quebec are not entitled to minority rights, since "English speaking citizens of Canada cannot be considered a linguistic minority".

== Separate opinions of HRC members ==
Waleed Sadi filed a dissent, considering that domestic remedies were not exhausted by authors before appealing to Human Rights Committee.

Birame Ndiaye filed a dissent, too, referring to Article 27 as protecting French linguistic minority in Canada and considering the limitations to freedom of expression justifiable by protecting Article 27 rights.

Kurt Herndl filed a partly concurring and partly dissenting opinion, considering that rights in question had concerned only Article 19, not Article 27. He also questioned status of victims of Ballantyne and Davidson.

Bertil Wennergren filed a concurrence, considering that "prohibition to use any other language than French for commercial outdoor advertising in Quebec does not infringe on any of the rights protected under article 27".

Elizabeth Evatt, Nisuke Ando, Marco Tulio Bruni Celli, and Vojin Dimitrijević filed a concurrence stating that the term "minority" should not be interpreted "solely on the basis of the number of members of the group in question in the State party".
