= Section 33 of the Canadian Charter of Rights and Freedoms =

Notwithstanding clause - Canadian Constitution

Section 33 of the Canadian Charter of Rights and Freedoms, commonly known as the notwithstanding clause (French: clause dérogatoire or clause nonobstant), allows the Parliament of Canada or provincial and territorial legislatures to temporarily override sections 2 and 7 through 15 of the Charter.

== Text ==
The text of section 33 is as follows: (Note: Canadian Charter of Rights and Freedoms, s. 33.)

Exception where express declaration
33(1) Parliament or the legislature of a province may expressly declare in an Act of Parliament or of the legislature, as the case may be, that the Act or a provision thereof shall operate notwithstanding a provision included in section 2 or sections 7 to 15.

Operation of exception
(2) An Act or a provision of an Act in respect of which a declaration made under this section is in effect shall have such operation as it would have but for the provision of this Charter referred to in the declaration.

Five year limitation
(3) A declaration made under subsection (1) shall cease to have effect five years after it comes into force or on such earlier date as may be specified in the declaration.

Re-enactment
(4) Parliament or the legislature of a province may re-enact a declaration made under subsection (1).

Five year limitation
(5) Subsection (3) applies in respect of a re-enactment made under subsection (4).

== Function ==
The Parliament of Canada, a provincial legislature, or a territorial legislature may enact a law stating that the legislation, or any of its provisions, operates notwithstanding one or more of sections 2 and 7–15 of the Charter. The notwithstanding clause cannot be invoked by implication; the law must clearly specify which Charter rights are being overridden. There is no special procedure for invoking the notwithstanding clause; the legislation is enacted through the ordinary legislative process and requires only a simple majority, like any other bill. A legislature may also invoke the notwithstanding clause by enacting a separate omnibus statute that specifies one or more laws which will going forward operate notwithstanding the identified Charter rights. (Note: Ford v Quebec (AG), 1988 CanLII 19, [1988] 2 SCR 712, Supreme Court (Canada))

Normally, the validity of a law may be challenged in court on the basis that it infringes a Charter right. If a court finds that a Charter right has been infringed, it may nonetheless uphold the law under Section 1 of the Charter if the court determines the infringement is justified in a free and democratic society. However, if the notwithstanding clause is invoked, it overrides the court's ability to review the law's compliance with the specified Charter rights.

Section 33(1) provides that the notwithstanding clause may only be used to override a "fundamental right", "legal right", or "equality right" under sections 2, and 7–15 of the Charter. The fundamental rights guaranteed under Section 2 of the Charter include: freedom of expression, freedom of religion, freedom of thought, freedom of belief, freedom of peaceful assembly and freedom of association. The legal rights guaranteed under sections 7–14 of the Charter include: the right to life, liberty and security of the person; protection against unreasonable search and seizure; protection against arbitrary detention or imprisonment; right to legal counsel and the guarantee of habeas corpus; rights in criminal and penal matters such as the right to be presumed innocent until proven guilty; protection against cruel and unusual punishment; protection against self-incrimination; and right to an interpreter in a court proceeding. The equality rights under section 15 of the Charter include protection from discrimination perpetrated by the government.

The notwithstanding clause does not apply to other rights enumerated in the Charter, including mobility rights (section 6), democratic rights (sections 3–5), language rights (sections 16–23), the enforcement provision (section 24), or the sexual equality clause (section 28).

Section 33(3) provides that a declaration invoking the notwithstanding clause expires after five years, or a shorter period specified in the law. However, section 33(4) permits the legislature to re-enact the invocation of the notwithstanding clause, which is subject to the five year expiry period. The five-year limit aligns with the maximum term of a legislature or Parliament before an election must be called, ensuring that the public can hold elected officials accountable. Therefore, if voters disagree with the law, they may elect new representatives who can repeal the legislation or allow the declaration to lapse.

== Purpose ==
The notwithstanding clause reflects the hybrid character of Canadian political institutions. In effect, it protects the British tradition of parliamentary supremacy under the American-style system of written constitutional rights and strong courts introduced in 1982. Former Prime Minister Jean Chrétien also described it as a tool that could guard against a hypothetical Supreme Court ruling legalizing hate speech and child pornography as freedom of expression.

== History ==
Pierre Trudeau advocated for the Patriation of the Canadian Constitution and a constitutional bill of rights after becoming Prime Minister in 1968. Various attempts to patriate and include the bill of rights, including the Victoria Charter, failed in the 1970s. Trudeau announced the intent to constitutionalize a bill of rights that would include: fundamental freedoms, such as the freedom of movement, democratic guarantees, legal rights, language rights and equality rights. This proposal gained popular support, but was opposed by the Progressive Conservative opposition. In 1981 the patriation process was accelerated when the Supreme Court of Canada in the Patriation Reference, affirmed that the federal government could unilaterally patriate the constitution, but a constitutional convention existed that some provincial approval should be sought for constitutional reform.

The inclusion of the notwithstanding clause in the Charter was proposed by Premier of Alberta Peter Lougheed. In 1972, Alberta passed the Alberta Bill of Rights which included its own notwithstanding clause on the suggestion of Attorney General of Alberta Merv Leitch. The clause was a compromise reached during the debate over the new constitution in the early 1980s. Among the provinces' major complaints about the Charter was that it shifted power from elected officers to the judiciary, giving the courts the final word. Section 33, along with the limitations clause, in section 1, was intended to give provincial legislators more leverage to pass law. Trudeau at first strongly objected to the clause, but eventually consented to its inclusion under pressure from the provincial premiers.

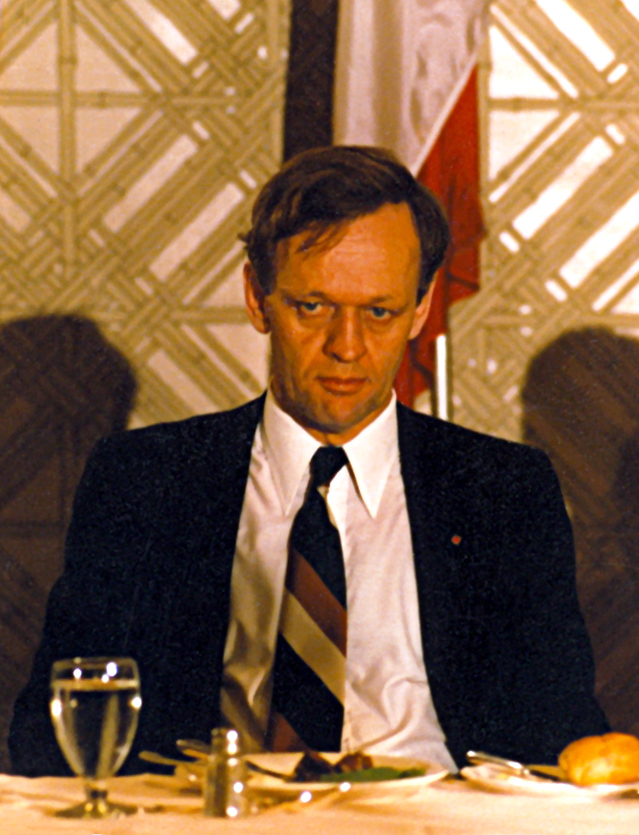
Justice Minister Jean Chrétien agreed to the notwithstanding clause in the Kitchen Accord.

The clause was included as part of what is known as the "Kitchen Accord". At the end of a conference on the constitution that was poised to end in deadlock, Jean Chrétien, the federal justice minister, and Roy McMurtry and Roy Romanow, both provincial ministers, met in a kitchen in the Government Conference Centre in Ottawa and sowed the seeds for a deal. This compromise caused two major changes to the constitution package: the first was that the Charter would include the "notwithstanding clause", and the second was an agreed-upon amending formula. They then worked through the night with consultations from different premiers, and agreement from almost everybody. However, they excluded from the negotiations René Lévesque, the premier of Quebec. He refused to agree to the deal, and the Quebec government declined to endorse the constitutional amendment. Chrétien would later say, of the notwithstanding clause, "Canada probably wouldn't have had any Charter without it."

In exchange for agreeing to the notwithstanding clause, Trudeau declined to remove the federal powers of disallowance and reservation from the draft Constitution.

When it was introduced, Alan Borovoy, the general counsel to the Canadian Civil Liberties Association, addressed concerns that the notwithstanding clause was susceptible to abuse from a government by stating that "Political difficulty is a reasonable safeguard for the charter."

According to Chrétien, in 1992, Trudeau blamed him for the notwithstanding clause, saying "you gave them that". Chrétien replied, "Sorry, Pierre. I recommended it. You gave it."

During the January 9, 2006, party leaders' debate for the 2006 federal election, Prime Minister Paul Martin unexpectedly pledged that his Liberal government, if returned, would support a constitutional amendment to prevent the federal government from invoking section 33, and challenged Conservative leader Stephen Harper to agree. This sparked a debate about how the notwithstanding clause could be amended. Some argued that the amending formula required the federal government to gain the approval of at least seven provinces with at least half the national population (the standard procedure). Others argued that, because the proposal would limit only the federal Parliament's powers, Parliament could make the change alone.

== Comparison with other human rights instruments ==
Constitutional scholar Peter Hogg has remarked that the notwithstanding clause "seems to be a uniquely Canadian invention". The United States Constitution gives no such powers to the states (see: nullification), but Article III, sect. 2 does authorize the Congress to remove jurisdiction from the federal courts. Not since World War II has Congress mustered the requisite majority.

However, the concept of the notwithstanding clause was not created with the Charter. The presence of the clause makes the Charter similar to the Canadian Bill of Rights (1960), which, under section 2, states that "an Act of the Parliament" may declare that a law "shall operate notwithstanding the Canadian Bill of Rights". A primary difference is that the Bill of Rights' notwithstanding clause could be used to invalidate "any" right, not just specified clauses as with the Charter. The Saskatchewan Human Rights Code (1979), the Quebec Charter of Human Rights and Freedoms (1977), and the Alberta Bill of Rights (1972) also contain devices like the notwithstanding clause.

Outside Canada, Israel added a device similar to the notwithstanding clause to one of its Basic Laws in 1992. However, this power could be used only in respect of the freedom of occupation. The 2023 Israeli judicial reform envisaged extending this power to all matters, including the Basic Laws which do not deal with rights and freedoms.

In Victoria, Australia, section 31 of the Victorian Charter of Human Rights and Responsibilities fulfils a similar purpose. (Note: Charter of Human Rights and Responsibilities Act 2006, No. 43 of 2006, s.31.) The uncodified constitution of the United Kingdom has an implicit equivalent of a notwithstanding clause: following the doctrine of parliamentary sovereignty, the courts have no power to declare primary legislation invalid on constitutional grounds, including on grounds of incompatibility with the European Convention on Human Rights. The Human Rights Act 1998 requires legislation to be interpreted in a way compatible with the Convention if possible, but they must nonetheless enforce any primary legislation that they cannot so interpret. This does not apply to secondary legislation or devolved legislation, which may be ultra vires if incompatible.

== Uses and proposed uses ==
Four provinces and one territory have passed laws invoking the notwithstanding clause. The clause has been invoked most frequently by Quebec, including the blanket application of the clause to every law from 1982 to 1985, a French-only sign law in 1988, a law prohibiting state-affiliated employees from wearing religious symbols in 2019, and a law strengthening the use of French in 2022. Saskatchewan passed a strike-break act invoking the clause in 1986, and passed a law in 2018 (never brought into force) invoking the clause to permit the government to pay for non-Catholics to attend publicly funded Catholic schools. Alberta passed a law invoking the clause in 2000 to define marriage as "between a man and a woman". In 2025, Alberta invoked the clause once again to pass strike-breaking legislation against teachers. In 2021, Ontario passed a law invoking the clause to increase the period during which third-party groups must limit their activities in the lead-up to an election. Yukon invoked the clause in 1982, but this law was never brought into force.

The federal government has never invoked the notwithstanding clause.

Usages of the notwithstanding clause
Jurisdiction	Year	Period in effect	Statute enacting notwithstanding clause	Charter right(s) circumvented	Enacted	Notes on enactment
Quebec	1982	1982–1990	Act Respecting the Constitution Act, 1982, (Retroactive amendment of every existing law); (Note: Act respecting the Constitution Act, 1982, CQLR 1982, c. L-4.2) All new statutes from 1982 to 1985	Blanket application to sections 2 and 7 to 15 (all applicable Charter sections)	Yes	Brought into force, but was unnecessary in most cases. The Supreme Court accepted the validity of the blanket application in Ford v. Quebec (at para. 35).
Yukon	1982	—N/a	Land Planning and Development Act (Note: Land Planning and Development Act, SY 1982 c 22, s 39)	Section 15 equality rights pertaining appointment to committees	Maybe	Received royal assent, but not brought into force.
House of Commons	1983	—N/a	An Act respecting the Execution of Clifford Robert Olson (Bill C-671) (Note: Taylor, Gordon (January 20, 1983). "Bill C-671; An Act respecting the Execution of Clifford Robert Olson". House of Commons Bills, 32nd Parliament, 1st Session: C583-C700. Canadian Parliamentary Historical Resources.; Gordon Edward Taylor (January 20, 1983). "Act respecting the Execution of Clifford Robert Olson". Parliamentary Debates (Hansard). Vol. 19. Canada: Commons. Part 32nd Parliament, 1st Session: col. 22046.)	Sections 2 and 7 to 15 (all applicable Charter sections)	No	Ruled out of order (bill of attainder)
Quebec	1986	1986–present	An Act Respecting the Pension Plan of Certain Teachers	Section 15 (equality rights)	Yes	Renewed 7 times; set to expire in January 2025.
Quebec	1986	1986–present	An Act Respecting the Government and Public Employees Retirement Plan	Section 15 (equality rights)	Yes	Renewed 7 times; set to expire in January 2025.
Quebec	1986	1986–present	An Act Respecting the Teachers Pension Plan	Section 15 (equality rights)	Yes	Renewed 7 times; set to expire in January 2025.
Quebec	1986	1986–present	An Act Respecting the Civil Service Superannuation Plan	Section 15 (equality rights)	Yes	Renewed 7 times; set to expire in January 2025.
Quebec	1986	1986–2001	An Act Respecting the Conseil superieur de l'Éducation	Section 2(a) (freedom of religion and conscience) and section 15 (equality rights)	Yes	Renewed in 1988, 1994, and 1999; repealed in 2001.
Quebec	1986	1986–2001	An Act Respecting the Ministère de l'Éducation	Section 2(a) (freedom of religion and conscience) and section 15 (equality rights)	Yes	Renewed in 1988, 1994, and 1999; repealed in 2001.
Quebec	1986	1986–2008	The Education Act for Cree, Inuit and Naskapi Native Persons	Section 2(a) (freedom of religion and conscience) and section 15 (equality rights)	Yes	Renewed 5 times; expired on July 1, 2008.
Quebec	1986	1986–1987	An Act to Amend the Act to Promote the Development of Agricultural Operations	Section 15 (equality rights)	Yes	Repealed in 1987.
Saskatchewan	1986	1986–1987	SGEU Dispute Settlement Act (Note: SGEU Dispute Settlement Act, SS 1986, c. 111, s. 9(1))	Section 2(d) (freedom of association)	Yes	Brought into force.
Quebec	1988	1988–2008	Education Act	Section 2(a) (freedom of religion and conscience) and section 15 (equality rights)	Yes	Renewed 4 times; expired on July 1, 2008.
Quebec	1988	1988–1993	An Act to Amend the Charter of the French Language (Note: An Act to Amend the Charter of the French Language, SQ 1988 c 54, s 10)	Section 2(b) (freedom of expression) and section 15 (equality rights)	Yes	Brought into force. Not re-enacted after the five-year expiry in 1993.
Quebec	1989	1989–1999	An Act Respecting School Elections	Section 2(a) (freedom of religion and conscience) and section 15 (equality rights)	Yes	Renewed in 1994; repealed in 1999.
Quebec	1992	1992–1997	An Act Respecting Private Education	Section 2(a) (freedom of religion and conscience) and section 15 (equality rights)	Yes	Expired after 5 years in 1997 and not renewed.
Alberta	1998	—N/a	Institutional Confinement and Sexual Sterilization Compensation Act (Note: Bill 26, Institutional Confinement and Sexual Sterilization Compensation Act, 2nd Sess, 24th Leg, Alberta, 1998.)	Sections 2 and 7 to 15 (all applicable Charter sections)	No	Bill dropped by legislature.
Alberta	2000	2000–2004	Marriage Amendment Act, 2000 (Note: Marriage Act, RSA 2000, c. M-5, as amended by Marriage Amendment Act, 2000, SA 2000, c. 3)	Sections 2 and 7 to 15 (all applicable Charter sections)	Yes	Came into force; notwithstanding clause expired by operation of law in March 2005.
Quebec	2001	2001–present	An Act Respecting the Pension Plan of Management Personnel	Section 15 (equality rights)	Yes	Renewed 4 times; set to expire in January 2025.
Quebec	2005	2005–2008	Act to Amend Various Legislative Provisions of a Confessional Nature in the Education Field	Section 2(a) (freedom of religion and conscience) and section 15 (equality rights)	Yes	Permitted schools to continue offering religious programs until July 2008, at which point the clause expired.
Saskatchewan	2018	—N/a	School Choice Protection Act (Note: School Choice Protection Act, SS 2018, c. 39, s. 2.2(1))	Section 2 (fundamental freedoms) and Section 15 (equality rights)	Maybe	Received royal assent, but not brought into force. Usage of the Clause became unnecessary when the original court case was overturned on appeal.
Ontario	2018	—N/a	Efficient Local Government Act, 2018 (Note: Bill 31, Efficient Local Government Act, 2018, 1st Sess, 42nd Leg, Ontario, 2018.)	Sections 2, 7 and 15 (all applicable Charter sections)	No	Bill dropped by legislature when Court of Appeal granted a stay of the lower court's decision
Quebec	2019	2019–present	An Act Respecting the Laicity of the State (Note: An Act respecting the laicity of the State, SQ 2019, c. 12 (An Act respecting the laicity of the State at CanLII)) (Bill 21)	Sections 2 and 7 to 15 (all applicable Charter sections)	Yes	Received royal assent and brought into force on June 16, 2019. Renewed in May 2024. (Note: An Act to enable the Parliament of Québec to preserve the principle of parliamentary sovereignty with respect to the Act respecting the laicity of the State, SQ 2024, c. 12)
New Brunswick	2019	—N/a	An Act Respecting Proof of Immunization (Note: Bill 11, An Act Respecting Proof of Immunization, 3rd Sess, 59th Leg, New Brunswick, 2019.)	Sections 2 and 7 to 15 (all applicable Charter sections)	No	Clause removed from bill prior to defeat at third reading.
Ontario	2021	2021–2023	Protecting Elections and Defending Democracy Act, 2021 (Note: Protecting Elections and Defending Democracy Act, 2021, SO 2021, c. 31)	Sections 2 and 7 to 15 (all applicable Charter sections)	Yes, but later struck down by the courts	Received royal assent on June 14, 2021. The act was struck down in March 2023 by the Court of Appeal for Ontario for violating a section of the Charter not protected by Section 33.
Quebec	2022	2022–present	An Act respecting French, the official and common language of Québec (Note: An Act respecting French, the official and common language of Québec, SQ 2022, c. 14 (An Act respecting French, the official and common language of Québec at CanLII)) (Bill 96)	Sections 2 and 7 to 15 (all applicable Charter sections)	Yes	Received royal assent on June 1, 2022.
Ontario	2022	—N/a	Keeping Students in Class Act, 2022 (Note: Keeping Students in Class Act, 2022, SO 2022, c. 19 (Keeping Students in Class Act, 2022 at CanLII))	Sections 2, 7 and 15	Yes, but later nullified retroactively	Received royal assent on November 3, 2022. Repealed and retroactively nullified on November 14, 2022. (Note: Keeping Students in Class Repeal Act, 2022, SO 2022, c. 20)
Saskatchewan	2023	2023–present	The Education (Parents’ Bill of Rights) Amendment Act, 2023 (Bill 137)	Sections 2, 7 and 15	Yes	Royal assent received and came into force on October 20, 2023.
Alberta	2025	2025–present	Back to School Act (Bill 2)	Sections 2 and 7 to 15 (all applicable Charter sections)	Yes	Royal assent received and came into force on October 28, 2025. (Note: Back to School Act, SA 2025, c. B-0.5)
Québec	2025	2025–present	An Act to, in particular, reinforce laicity in the education network and to amend various legislative provisions (Bill 94)	Sections 2 and 7 to 15 (all applicable Charter sections)	Yes	Royal assent received and came into force on October 30, 2025. (Note: n Act to, in particular, reinforce laicity in the education network and to amend various legislative provisions, SQ 2025, c. 29)
British Columbia	2025	—N/a	Protecting Minors from Gender Transition Act (Note: Bill M-216, Protecting Minors from Gender Transition Act, 1st Sess, 43rd Leg, British Columbia, 2025 (on Archive.org).)	Sections 2 and 7 to 15 (all applicable Charter sections)	No	Bill defeated at first reading.
Alberta	2025	2025–present	Protecting Alberta's Children Statutes Amendment Act, 2025 (Bill 9)	Sections 2 and 7 to 15 (all applicable Charter sections)	Yes	Royal assent received and came into force on 11 December 2025 (Note: Bill 9, 2nd Sess, 31st Leg, Alberta, 2025)
Quebec	2025	2025–present	An Act respecting the reinforcement of laicity in Québec (Bill 9)	Sections 2 and 7 to 15 (all applicable Charter sections)	Yes	Bill adopted on 9 April 2026 (Note: Bill 9,, 2nd Sess, 43rd Leg, Québec, 2025)
British Columbia	2026	—N/a	Drug Recovery and Community Safety Act	Sections 2 and 7 to 15 (all applicable Charter sections)	No	Ruled out of order after first reading (Note: Bill M 235,, 2nd Sess, 43rd Leg, British Columbia, 2026)

=== Alberta ===
==== Compensation for forced sterilization (1998) ====
In 1998, Alberta introduced, but later abandoned, a bill that would attempt to use the notwithstanding clause to limit lawsuits against the government for past forced sterilizations approved by the Alberta Eugenics Board before the Sexual Sterilization Act was repealed.

==== Same-sex marriage (2000) ====
In March 2000, the Legislature of Alberta passed Bill 202, which amended the province's Marriage Act to include an opposite-sex-only definition of marriage as well as the notwithstanding clause to insulate the definition from Charter challenges. However, a legislature may use the "notwithstanding clause" only on legislation it would otherwise have the authority to enact, and the Supreme Court of Canada ruled in 2004 in Reference re Same-Sex Marriage that the definition of marriage is within the exclusive domain of the Parliament of Canada. The implication was Bill 202 was ultra vires, or beyond the constitutional powers of the Alberta Legislature.

==== Back to School Act (2025) ====
In October 2025, the legislature proposed Bill 2, the Back to School Act, which invoked the notwithstanding clause in suspending sections 2 and 7 to 15, which outline fundamental freedoms, legal rights, and equality rights. Most importantly it suspended the freedom of association, which has protected unions' right to strike since Saskatchewan Federation of Labour v Saskatchewan.

The act was written to order the Alberta Teachers' Association, which had been on strike since early that month, back to work.

Some have said that this usage of Section 33 has implications beyond Alberta and could influence other provincial governments to use it in their own labour disputes.

==== Anti-trans legislation (2025) ====
In 2024, Premier Danielle Smith said she might use the notwithstanding clause to protect a ban on gender-affirming healthcare, which would become the case in a bill introduced in November 2025.

==== Other discussions of its use in Alberta ====
There were also discussions to invoke the notwithstanding clause following the Supreme Court of Canada's 1998 decision in Vriend v Alberta, but were resisted by Premier Ralph Klein at the time.

=== New Brunswick ===
==== Mandatory vaccinations (2019) ====
On November 22, 2019, Education Minister Dominic Cardy introduced a bill in the Legislative Assembly of New Brunswick to end non-medical exemptions to vaccinations in school children, which includes invoking the notwithstanding clause. Cardy said this was to pre-empt any court and charter challenges to the bill by "an organized, well-financed lobby out there that's intent on derailing efforts to protect vulnerable children". The use of the notwithstanding clause was removed from the bill in June 2020, before the bill was ultimately defeated in a free vote at third reading in the legislature.

=== Ontario ===
==== Municipal elections (2018) ====
In August 2018, the government of Ontario passed the Better Local Government Act, which, among other things, ordered the Toronto City Council to change its electoral ward boundaries for the 2018 municipal election to match the boundaries used for federal and provincial electoral ridings, thus reducing the number of wards from 47 to 25. Premier of Ontario Doug Ford stated that the council had "failed to act on the critical issues facing the city", and claimed cost savings of $25 million over the next four years. The bill was controversial for both its intent and its timing, as it came in the midst of a municipal election campaign. The electoral boundaries had already been realigned for the 2018 election to expand it from 44 to 47 wards, by consolidating several existing wards and adding new ones.

On September 10, 2018, the act was struck down by Superior Court Justice Edward Belobaba as unconstitutional, ruling that the larger wards infringed voters' rights to an election whose outcome provides "effective representation", and that unilaterally changing electoral boundaries in the middle of a campaign infringed on candidates' freedom of expression. Shortly afterward, Ford announced his intent to table legislation authorizing an invocation of the notwithstanding clause to overturn the ruling, which, if passed, would have been the first use of the notwithstanding clause in Ontario. However, on September 19, the Court of Appeal for Ontario granted a stay of the Superior Court's decision, allowing the province to again implement a 25-ward structure for the City of Toronto. During the oral argument for that case, the counsel for the attorney general stated that the provincial government would not proceed with the legislation to invoke the notwithstanding clause if the stay was granted. Belobaba's ruling was ultimately overturned 3–2 by the Court of Appeal in a full hearing. The Court of Appeal ruling was upheld by the Supreme Court of Canada in 2021; in a 5-4 ruling, a majority of the Court ruled that Ontario's Better Local Government Act violated neither freedom of expression nor the unwritten constitutional principle of democracy. (Note: Toronto (City) v Ontario (Attorney General), 2021 SCC 34, Supreme Court (Canada))

==== Third-party political advertising (2021) ====
In early 2021, the Ontario government passed the Protecting Ontario Elections Act, 2021, which restricted the ability of private sector organizations from running political advertisements outside of election periods. In June, The Ontario Superior Court found the law to violate freedom of expression, and struck down those sections of the law. The Ontario government then passed the Protecting Elections and Defending Democracy Act, 2021 to enact the restrictions using the notwithstanding clause.

In March 2023, the Court of Appeal for Ontario struck down the law again as violation of voter participation rights protected by section 3 of the Charter, which cannot be subject to the notwithstanding clause. In 2025, a 5–4 majority of the Supreme Court of Canada affirmed the Court of Appeal decision. (Note: Ontario (Attorney General) v Working Families Coalition (Canada) Inc, 2025 SCC 5, Supreme Court (Canada))

==== Education worker labour rights (2022) ====
On November 3, 2022, the government of Ontario passed a bill that imposed a contract on Ontario education workers who were part of the Canadian Union of Public Employees to prevent them from striking; the bill used the notwithstanding clause in an attempt to prohibit the union from a constitutional challenge regarding the freedom to associate. Despite this, the education workers still went on strike after the bill was passed.

The Ontario government faced heavy backlash from the general public over the law. Other unions also threatened to walk off the job and protest the law in solidarity. As a result, the government made a deal with CUPE where the law was repealed with the provisions and penalties deemed to have never been in effect, and in exchange CUPE ended their strike and contract negotiations resumed.

=== Quebec ===
==== Blanket application (1982–1985) ====
After the Charter came into force in 1982, the Parti Québécois government passed the Act respecting the Constitution Act, which inserted wording invoking section 33 into every law passed by the National Assembly of Quebec, as well as retroactively amending every existing law, in an attempt to ensure that no provincial law could ever be challenged in the courts on grounds in the relevant Charter sections. This practice ended in 1985, when the newly elected Quebec Liberals discontinued the blanket application of the notwithstanding clause. The Quebec Liberals did successfully invoke the notwithstanding clause to apply to a number of pieces of legislation pertaining to education and pensions between 1986 and 1992. Many of these uses of the notwithstanding clause were subsequently re-enacted.

The way the Quebec legislature deployed the clause in the late 1980s diminished public respect in the rest of the country for section 33. Due to the mass opposition that its use, or even threatened use, as in the case of Alberta (listed above), would evoke, the act of invoking the notwithstanding clause would be more politically costly even than had always been apprehended, according to some.

==== Sign laws (1988) ====
On December 21, 1988, after the decision of the Supreme Court of Canada in Ford v Quebec (AG), the National Assembly of Quebec employed section 33 and the equivalent section 52 of the Quebec Charter of Human Rights and Freedoms in their Bill 178. This allowed Quebec to continue to restrict the posting of certain commercial signs in languages other than French. In 1993, after the law was criticized by the United Nations Human Rights Committee, the Bourassa government had the National Assembly rewrite the law to conform to Supreme Court's interpretation of the right to freedom of expression in section 2(b) Charter, and the notwithstanding clause was removed.

==== Wearing of religious symbols by public servants / Laïcité (2019-) ====
On March 28, 2019, the recently elected Coalition Avenir Québec (CAQ) government applied the notwithstanding clause in Bill 21 (An Act respecting the Laicity of the State). The bill was passed on June 16, 2019, and prevents public workers in positions of authority from wearing religious symbols. It also prevents people from receiving public services with their faces covered.

On May 2, 2024, the National Assembly of Quebec voted to renew Bill 21 by using the notwithstanding clause for five more years until 2029.

This ban would be further extended with Bill 94, in 2025, to encompass a ban on prayer rooms, and an obligation to have one's face uncovered. It equally extends the ban on religious symbols to non-teaching personnel in schools.

==== French language requirements for multiple sectors (2021) ====
The stated goal of Bill 96 was "to affirm that the only official language of Québec is French. It also affirms that French is the common language of the Québec nation." Bill 96 was adopted on May 24, 2022, with 78 MNAs in favour and 29 against (from the Liberal Party and Parti Québécois). Instead of applying the notwithstanding clause only to parts of Bill 96, the Coalition Avenir Québec government applied it to the entire Bill.

The amendment expanded the requirements of businesses to communicate in French. Previously, businesses with more than 50 employees faced additional responsibilities to have the common language be French. The amendment lowered that minimum from 50 employees to 25.

Employers may not require knowledge of a language other than French during "recruitment, hiring, transfer or promotion," unless they can show that additional language is necessary and they took "all reasonable means to avoid imposing such a requirement."

The amendment also granted search and seizure laws to the Office québécois de la langue française (OQLF) and the Minister Responsible for the French Language. Section 111 gives the OQLF authorization to "enter at any reasonable hour any place, other than a dwelling house," where a business conducts activity or holds documents. The amendment requires that anyone present with access to a device or data must provide that access to the inspectors; the inspectors also may seize devices and data for future examination and reproduction without a warrant.

The amendment also impacted health care and social services, limiting service in English to "historic anglophones" or "ayant droit", immigrants, refugees, or asylum seekers who have been in Quebec for less than 6 months, or "where health, public safety or the principles of natural justice so require." The Minister of Justice and French Language, Simon Jolin-Barrette, said that access would not change for English speakers, but critics suggested that the law is unclear, especially since unlike in the Act respecting the laicity of the State, no special exemption is explicit.

=== Saskatchewan ===
==== Back-to-work legislation (1986) ====
In 1986, the Legislature of Saskatchewan enacted the SGEU Dispute Settlement Act, which required striking government workers to return to work. The Court of Appeal for Saskatchewan had previously held that a similar back-to-work law was unconstitutional because it infringed workers' freedom of association. The government appealed that decision to the Supreme Court of Canada. Since the Court of Appeal decision was still the statement of law at the time of the SGEU Dispute Settlement Act, a clause was written into the act, invoking the section 33 override. The earlier law was later found by the Supreme Court to be consistent with the Charter, meaning the use of the clause had been unnecessary. (Note: RWDSU v Saskatchewan, 1987 CANLII 90, [1987] 1 SCR 460, Supreme Court (Canada))

==== Catholic school funding (2018) ====
In May 2018, the Saskatchewan Legislature invoked the notwithstanding clause to overrule a 2017 Court of Queen's Bench ruling, which stated the government could not provide funding for non-Catholic students to attend Catholic separate schools. The Saskatchewan Court of Appeal overturned the decision in March 2020, and the Supreme Court of Canada declined leave to appeal. (Note: Good Spirit School Division No. 204 v Christ the Teacher Roman Catholic Separate School Division No. 212, 2020 SKCA 34, Court of Appeal (Saskatchewan, Canada), overturning Good Spirit School Division No. 204 v Christ the Teacher Roman Catholic Separate School Division No. 212, 2017 SKQB 109, Court of Queen's Bench (Saskatchewan, Canada)) With the original decision overturned, there was no longer a need for the notwithstanding clause.

==== Parent consent for non-conforming gender identity in school (2023) ====
In 2023, Premier Scott Moe told reporters that the province would be willing to use the notwithstanding clause to uphold a policy requiring parents be notified of and approve any requested name and pronoun change from their child before it be recognized at school. This came after legal action was initiated by an advocacy group against the provincial government, the province's youth advocate published a report against the policy, and a Regina court granted an injunction to stop the policy.

The bill, titled the "Parents' Bill of Rights", was passed on October 20, 2023.

==== Other discussions of its use in Saskatchewan ====
Following a Supreme Court of Canada decision of January 30, 2015, (Note: Saskatchewan Federation of Labour v Saskatchewan, 2015 SCC 4, Supreme Court (Canada)) which struck down Saskatchewan essential service legislation, Premier Brad Wall publicly considered using the notwithstanding clause to protect the province's ability to force essential service employees back to work.

=== Yukon ===
==== Committee appointments (1982) ====
In 1982, the legislature of Yukon made use of the notwithstanding clause in the Land Planning and Development Act. This was the first use, by any Canadian legislature, of the section 33 override. However, as constitutional scholar Peter Hogg notes, the "statute ... was never brought into force and so scarcely counts as an example".
