= Pastagate =

2013 incident in Quebec regarding menu names

Pastagate is the informal name of an incident that began in 2013 in Quebec, when, on 14 February, an inspector of the Office québécois de la langue française (OQLF) sent a letter of warning to upscale Montreal restaurant Buonanotte, for using Italian words such as pasta on its menu instead of the French equivalent, pâtes. The incident occurred as the National Assembly was debating Bill 14, a bill to toughen the province's Charter of the French Language.

Instead of complying with instructions on the letter he received from the OQLF, the owner of Buonanotte went public, and it generated a widespread public outcry across the province, even among francophones, about the OQLF abusing its powers. The incident also received international attention, causing embarrassment to the provincial government. The incident led to the resignation of Louise Marchand, head of the OQLF, on 8 March.

== History ==
Dan Delmar of radio station CJAD in Montreal first broke the story on his blog on 19 February 2013. A group called putbacktheflag was credited for fuelling Pastagate by sharing over 20,000 links on its Facebook and Twitter pages within the first day of the initial story breaking. According to Sun News, "the story has gained traction on social media, with the Facebook page entitled 'Put Canadian Flag Back In Quebec Assembly', leading the charge". The group was instrumental in starting protests against Bill 14 in Montreal.

Following the Buonanotte incident, other businesses went public with tales of being hassled by language inspectors. The controversy led to the resignation of OQLF chief Louise Marchand.

== Aftermath ==
Following Louise Marchand's resignation, OQLF inspectors were given more discretion in applying the language law. Specifically, the office investigates complaints on the basis of whether they affect an individual or are of concern to the general public. Also, certain culinary terms from other cultures may be used in Quebec restaurants. A position to investigate complaints against the OQLF was established in June 2014.
