= Bill 86 =

Act of the Quebec National Assembly

The Act amending the Charter of the French language (French: Loi modifiant la Charte de la langue française), called Bill 86, (French: loi 86), is a law in Quebec, Canada, which modified the Charter of the French Language to allow the use of languages other than French on outdoor public signs in Quebec, as long as French is predominant. It was passed on June 17, 1993, by the Liberal government of Robert Bourassa.
