= Office québécois de la langue française =

French language regulator in Quebec

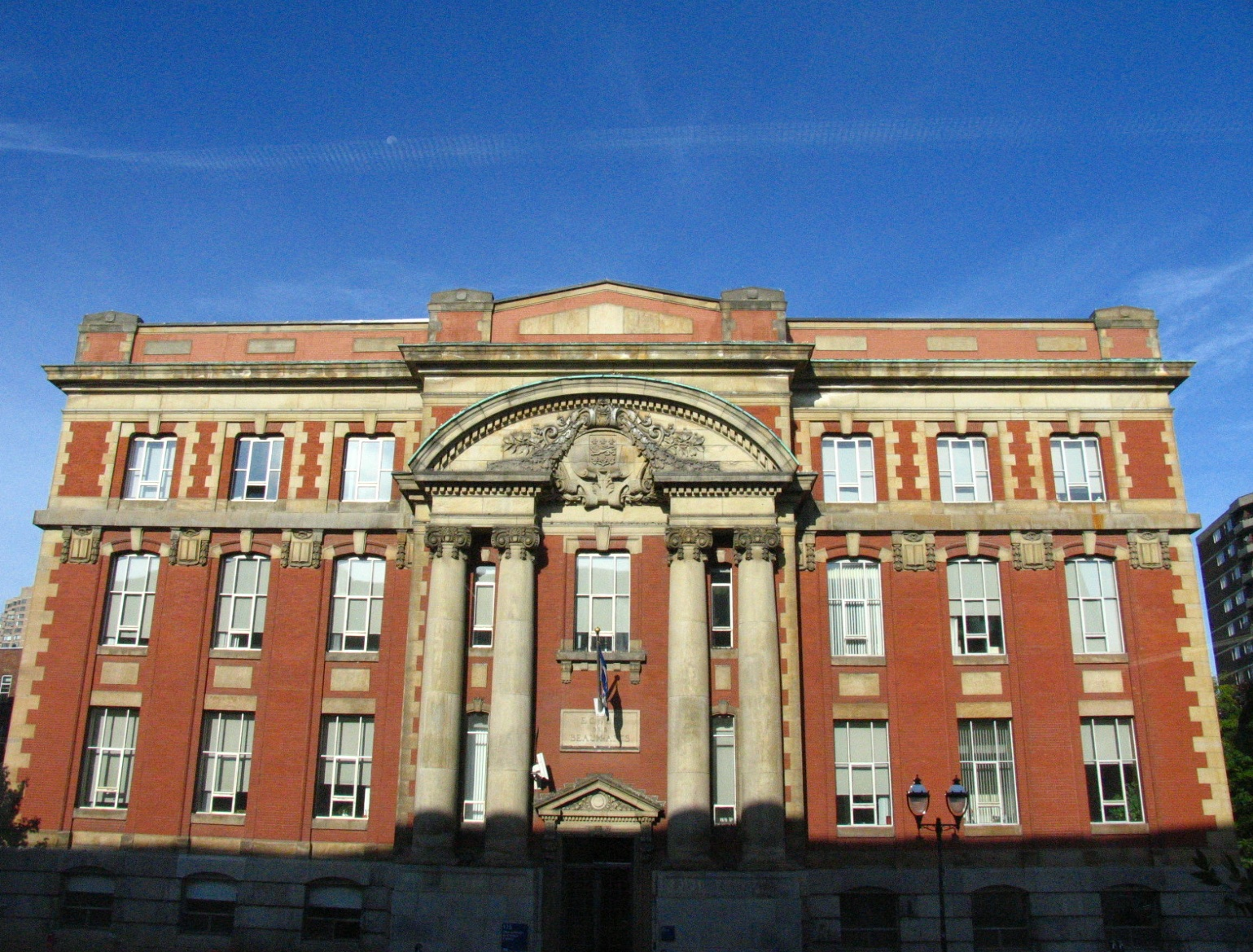
- The OQLF's main office, located in the old building of the École des beaux-arts de Montréal

Agency overview
- Formed: 24 March 1961
- Headquarters: 125, rue Sherbrooke Ouest, Montreal, Quebec
- Employees: 219
- Annual budget: C$32.963 million (2022–2023)
- Minister responsible: Jean‑François Roberge
- Agency executive: Dominique Malack, CEO
- Child agency: Commission de toponymie du Québec
- Website: www.oqlf.gouv.qc.ca

The Office québécois de la langue française (pronounced [ɔfis kebekwa də la lɑ̃ɡ fʁɑ̃sɛːz], (Note: locally [ɔfɪs kebekwɑ də la lãɡ fʁãsaɛ̯z]) OQLF; lit. 'Quebec Office of the French Language') is an agency of the Quebec provincial government charged with ensuring legislative requirements with respect to the right to use French are respected.

Established on 24 March 1961 by the Liberal government of Jean Lesage, the OQLF was attached to the Ministry of Culture and Communications. Its initial mission, defined in its report of 1 April 1964, was "to align with international French, promote good Canadianisms and fight Anglicisms, ... work on the normalization of the language in Quebec and support State intervention to carry out a global language policy that would consider notably the importance of socio-economic motivations in making French the priority language in Quebec".

Its mandate was enlarged by the 1977 Charter of the French Language, which established two other organizations — the Toponomy Commission and the Superior Council of the French Language — as well as by amendments since made to the Charter, most significantly, the 2022 reform.

== History ==
The creation of a Board of the French language was one of the recommendations of the Tremblay Royal Commission of Inquiry on Constitutional Problems which published its five-volume report in 1956. Such an institution was part of the list of 46 vows formulated by the Second Congress on the French Language in Canada held in Quebec City in 1937.

In 1961, the Act to Establish the Quebec Ministry of Cultural Affairs was passed, providing for the creation of the Office de la langue française (Office of the French Language) (OLF). The OLF's mission aimed at ensuring the correct usage of French and the enrichment of the spoken and written language. In 1969, the Act to Promote the French Language was passed, which expanded the mandate of the OLF and introduced the notion of the right to work in French.

In 1974, the Official Language Act was adopted, which strengthened the status and use of French in Quebec and gave the OLF a decisive role in the implementation of its provisions. In 1977, the Charter of the French Language was passed. The first mandatory language law, it incorporates and broadens several elements of the Official Language Act and substantially enhances the status of the French language in Quebec. For its implementation, the Charter establishes, in addition to the OLF, the Toponymy Commission, the Monitoring and Inquiry Commission and the French Language Council.

Schwartz's, along with Dunn's and other well-known delicatessen establishments, fought a ruling to change the name of "smoked meat" to "boeuf mariné" in order to conform to the law in 1986. They won the ruling on appeal by proving that if they didn't advertise "smoked meat" they would confuse and anger customers. Under the new ruling, enacted in 1987, "smoked meat" became a term in both official languages of Canada. The OQLF took action against Schwartz's, Dunn's, and other stores retailing imported kosher goods that did not meet its labelling requirements in 1996, an action perceived in the Jewish community as an unfair targeting and antisemitism. This coincided with high-profile cases brought by the OQLF against Schwartz's and Dunn's due to the apostrophe in the establishment's sign, which remains.

The OLF was renamed Office québécois de la langue française (Quebec Office of the French Language) (OQLF) pursuant to the adoption of Bill 104 by the National Assembly of Quebec on 12 June 2003, which merged the OLF with the French Language Protection Commission) and part of the French Language High Council. Now entrusted to the OQLF were two new mandates: the handling of complaints and the monitoring of the linguistic situation. The OQLF has since created two committees each chaired by a member of its Board: the Linguistic Officialization Committee and the Linguistic Status Monitoring Committee.

One case that gained international attention in 2013 was dubbed "Pastagate", in which the OQLF cited an Italian restaurant for using the word "Pasta" on its menu instead of the French word "pâtes". After receiving negative coverage throughout the world including the US and Europe, the OQLF eventually backed down, admitting to being "overzealous" and stating they will perform a review of the way these types of complaints are handled.

On 1 June 2022, the OQLF gained new powers with the National Assembly's adoption of the An Act Respecting French, the Official and Common Language of Quebec, which amended the Charter, creating additional obligations for organizations and businesses to fulfil the right to work and be served in French.

== Mission and powers ==
Sections 159 to 164 of the Charter of the French Language define the mission and powers of the OQLF:

- Section 159: to define and conduct Quebec's policy pertaining to linguistic officialization, terminology and francization of public administration and businesses;
- Section 160: to monitor the linguistic situation in Quebec and to report thereon to the Minister at least every five years;
- Section 161: to ensure French is the normal and common language of work, communication, commerce and business in the civil administration and businesses;
- Section 162: to assist and inform the civil administration, semipublic agencies, businesses, associations and bodies corporate with regard to the correction and enrichment of spoken and written French in Québec;
- Section 163: to establish the research programmes needed for the application of the Act; and
- Section 164: to enter into agreements or take part in joint projects with any person or agency.

In 2004, the organization had a yearly budget of $17.8 million. In 2005-2006, the budget rose to $18.5 million, in 2007-2008 to $19.0 million and to $24.453 million in 2018-2019.

The OQLF was created to enforce the everyday use of the French language in Quebec. The OQLF promoted the Quebec Charter of the French Language and, prior to 1988, was responsible for enforcing a regulation whereby French was the only language authorized on outdoor commercial signage. After multiple successful legal challenges, the role of the OQLF has since changed to ensuring French is the "predominant" language, meaning at least twice the size of any and all other languages. The OQLF has been referred to in English as "tongue troopers". The term "language police" was possibly first used by the American television show 60 Minutes, which ran an investigative report on Quebec language laws. Legally, the organization has no police powers, instead relying on the threat of fines or the withholding of a company's "francisation certificate".

Starting in 1989, the office has produced reports on the level of French language service in shops in the province based on using undercover observers who record the language of greeting and if French language service is available spontaneously or only after prompting. The studies have been repeated five times: in 1996, 2010, 2012, 2019, and 2024. The 2024 study was based on 10,378 visits to 7,314 stores between August 2022 and April 2023. About a third of the visits were to stores in the Anglophone-heavy western part of Montreal. Problems arise in majority English-speaking towns, such as Shawville, which has seen conflicts between shopkeepers and agents over the language laws.

== Members ==
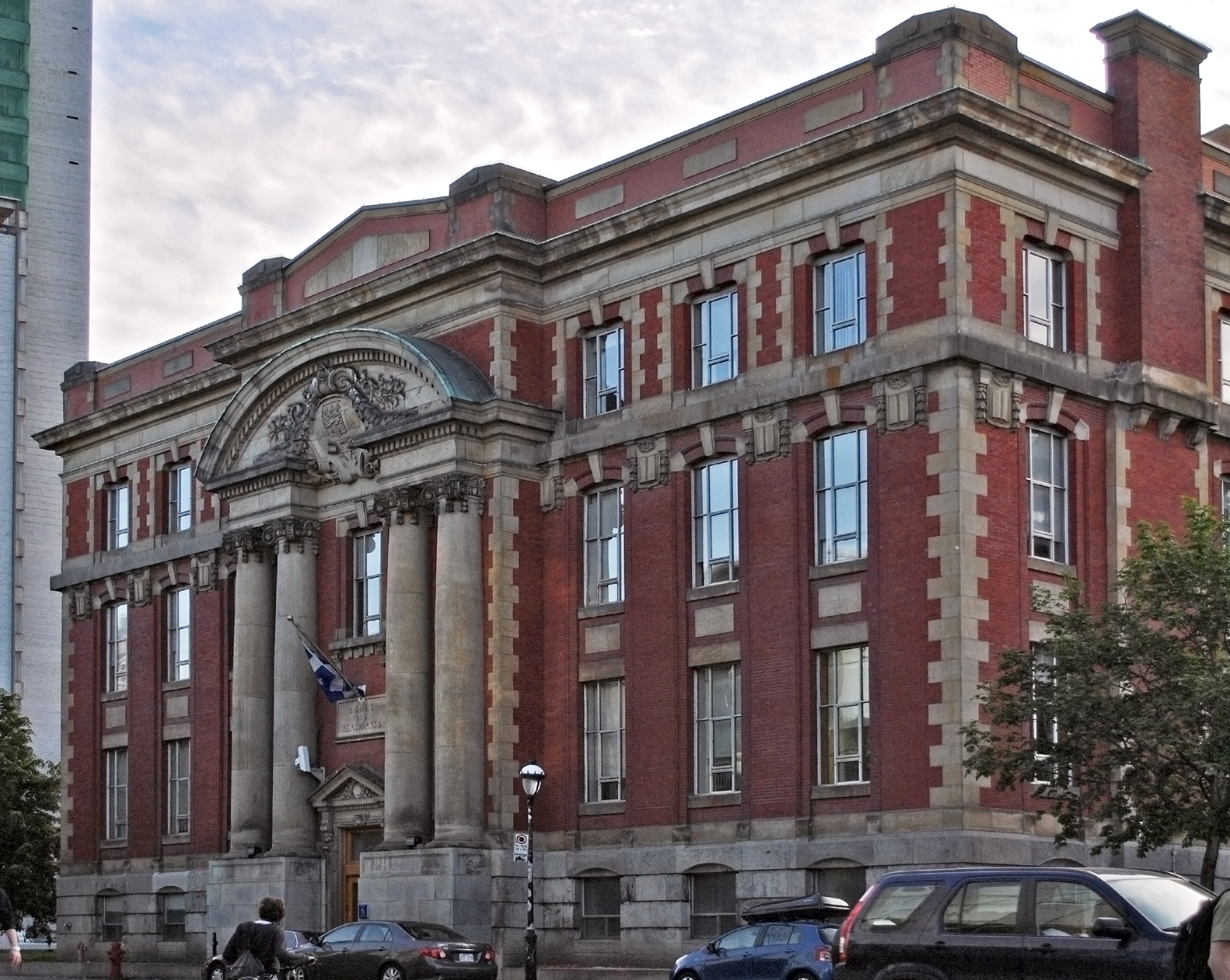
The Montreal offices of the OQLF

As of July 2024, the OQLF's eight Board members, each appointed by the government for a term of up to five years, were:

- Dominique Malack, Chief Executive Officer of the OQLF;
- Alain Bélanger, Associate Professor, Urbanization, Culture and Society Centre, National Institute of Scientific Research;
- Denis Bolduc, Secretary General, Quebec Federation of Labour;
- Juliette Champagne, Deputy Minister, Quebec Ministry of the French Language;
- François Côté, Lawyer;
- Chantal Gagnon, Associate Professor, Commercial Translation, University of Montreal;
- Tania Longpré, Francization Teacher, Lecturer and Doctoral Student on language instruction, University of Quebec - Montreal; and
- Frédéric Verreault, Executive Director, Corporate Development, Chantiers Chibougamau Ltd.

== Services ==
In exercising its mandate, the OQLF offers the following services to the population of Quebec:

- General information service via a toll free line, website and brochures;
- Francization services:
  - francization counselling (for businesses of 25 employees or more), and
  - technical assistance relating to Francization of information technologies;
- Processing complaints of non-compliance with the law;
- Terminology and linguistics tools and services:
  - the Grand dictionnaire terminologique (Comprehensive Terminological Dictionary),
  - the Banque de dépannage linguistique (Language helpdesk), and
  - personalized terminological and linguistic consultation;
- Publications of the OQLF:
  - Le français au bureau (French at the Office), a book for the general public pertaining to administrative and commercial writing, and
  - Terminology works: dictionaries, lexicons addressed principally to specialists;
- Libraries: one in Montreal and the other in Quebec City; and
- Evaluation of French competency for candidates to Quebec's professional associations.

== Awards ==
Many distinctions are given by the OQLF to reward persons and organizations contributing to the survival of the French language in the Americas. They are given as part of the Grand Gala of French Awards which occurs each year, usually in March during the FrancoFête.

Since 1998, the OQLF has been rewarding outstanding francization efforts by persons and organizations in the form of awards in the areas of "work", "business" and "information technologies".

Since 1999, in collaboration with the Quebec Artists' Union, the Writers' Union and the Radio, Television and Film Authors' Association, the OQLF has included an awards category for "culture".

Since 1999, in place of the former French language award, it awards the Camille-Laurin Prize to underline a person's effort in promoting the usefulness and quality of French in his or her social milieu.

Since 2005, in collaboration with the Quebec-France Association and the Quebecers' National Movement, it awards the Quebec-France Marie-Claire-Blais Literary Prize to a French writer for his or her first work.

In collaboration with Quebec's Ministry of Immigration, it presents awards in the area of "newcomer francization", including for a "non-francophone newcomer", a "person working in the field of newcomer francization", a "community of institutional partner in francization" and a "business".

The Chair of the OQLF presides over the Jury of the Dictée of the Americas, an international competition of French spelling created by Télé-Québec in 1994.

== Complaints ==
Residents of Quebec alleging a violation of their linguistic rights "to be informed and served in French" can file a complaint, for which the OQLF which is responsible for processing. As per section 168 of the Charter, the complaint must be written in French and contain the identity of the complainant. The OQLF ensures privacy of information as required under the Act Respecting Access to Documents Held by Public Bodies and the Protection of Personal Information. The OQLF does not have the power to send an agent to investigate unless it has received a complaint or there has been a vote by the members of the OQLF.

According to the statistics of the OQLF, 95% of all complaints judged to be valid are resolved without resorting to legal action. In an average year, the OQLF receives between 3,000 and 4,000 complaints from citizens. Forty to fifty percent of these complaints have to do with commercial products for which there is no available French manual or packaging, 25% have to do with signage in stores, 10% with websites and 5% with the language of service.

In 2022-2023, the OQLF received a record number of complaints of possible violations of the Charter. In total, 6,884 complaints were filed, which represented a 9% increase over the previous year and a 145% increase over five years. The main issues identified were language of service (34%), language of websites (11%) and language of public display (17%). 85% of the complaints were resolved without resorting to legal sanctions.

== Today ==
Originally, the Charter of the French Language required that all commercial signage be in French and no other language. In 1988, in Ford v. Quebec, the Supreme Court of Canada ruled this was against the Canadian Charter of Rights and Freedoms. After massive protests in support of the legislation, the Bourassa Government invoked section 33 of the Canadian Charter of Rights and Freedoms, the notwithstanding clause, allowing the language laws to override the charter for a period of five years, after which they would be reviewed.

In 1993, the United Nations Human Rights Committee concluded in Ballantyne, Davidson, McIntyre v. Canada that it was outside of the Quebec government's jurisdiction to limit freedom of expression in a language of the person's choice. (See Legal dispute over Quebec's language policy.) Also in 1993, but not due to the UNHR ruling, Quebec reviewed the law and modified its language regulations to require that French be markedly predominant on exterior business signs, as suggested by the Supreme Court of Canada ruling in the case of Ford v. Quebec.

== See also ==
- Académie française of France, arbiter of the French language in France
- Charter of the French Language
- Ford v. Quebec (Attorney General) (1988), (2 S.C.R. 90)
- Legal dispute over Quebec's language policy
- Linguistic prescription
- Pastagate
- Politics of Quebec
- History of Quebec French
