= Charter of the French Language =

1977 law in Quebec, Canada

The Charter of the French Language (French: Charte de la langue française, pronounced [ʃaʁt də la lɑ̃ɡ fʁɑ̃sɛːz]), also known as Bill 101 (French: Loi 101, pronounced [lwa sɑ̃ œ̃]), is a law in the Canadian province of Quebec defining French, the language of the majority of the population, as the official language of the provincial government. It is the central piece of legislation that forms Quebec's language policy and one of the three principal statutes upon which the cohesion of Quebec's society is based, along with the Quebec Charter of Human Rights and Freedoms and the Civil Code of Quebec. The charter also protects the Indigenous languages in Quebec.

First introduced by Camille Laurin, the Minister of Cultural Development under the first Parti Québécois government of Premier René Lévesque, it was passed by the National Assembly and received royal assent on August 26, 1977. The charter's provisions expanded upon the 1974 Official Language Act (Bill 22), which was enacted during the tenure of Premier Robert Bourassa's Liberal government to make French the official language of Quebec. Prior to 1974, Quebec had no official language and was subject only to the requirements on the use of English and French contained in article 133 of the British North America Act, 1867. The charter has been amended more than six times since 1977, each of which met with controversy in Quebec. Most recently, in 2022, the charter was amended (also covered in this article) by the adoption of the Act respecting French, the Official and Common Language of Quebec, commonly known as Bill 96.

== Objective ==
The preamble of the Charter states that the National Assembly resolves "to make French the language of Government and the Law, as well as the normal and everyday language of work, instruction, communication, commerce and business". It also states that the National Assembly shall pursue this objective "in a spirit of fairness and open-mindedness" and recognizes "the right of the First Nations and the Inuit in Quebec, the first inhabitants of this land, to preserve and develop their original language and culture".

== Titles ==
The Charter consists of six titles and two schedules:

- Title I includes nine chapters pertaining to the status of the French language, which:
  - declare French the sole official language (chapter I),
  - define the fundamental language rights of persons (chapter II), and
  - define the status of French in the parliament and the courts (chapter III), the civil administration (chapter IV), the semipublic agencies (chapter V), labour relations (chapter VI), commerce and business (chapter VII) and language of instruction (chapter VIII).
- Title II includes five chapters pertaining to linguistic officialization, toponymy and the francization of the civil service and businesses.
- Title III establishes the Office québécois de la langue française (Quebec Office of the French language) and defines its mission, powers and organization.
- Title IV establishes the Conseil supérieur de la langue française (Superior Council of the French language).
- Title V and VI define penal provisions and sanctions and transitional and miscellaneous provisions.

== Status of the French language ==
In order to achieve the goal of making French the "normal and everyday language of work, instruction, communication, commerce and business" and ensure the respect of francophone Quebecers' language rights, the Charter contains a number of key provisions and various regulations.

=== Official language ===
In the first article of the Charter, French is declared the official language of Quebec.

The French language was previously declared the sole official language of Quebec with the adoption of the Official Language Act in 1974. Quebec is constitutionally obligated nonetheless to provide English services in the courts and the National Assembly of Quebec (see below).

=== Fundamental language rights ===
The fundamental French-language rights in Quebec are:

1. The right to have the civil administration, the health services and social services, the public utility enterprises, the professional corporations, the associations of employees and all enterprises doing business in Quebec communicate with the public in French. (article 2)
2. The right to speak French in deliberative assemblies. (article 3)
3. The right of workers to carry on their activities in French. (article 4)
4. The right of consumers to be informed and served in French. (article 5)
5. The right of persons eligible for instruction in Quebec to receive that instruction in French. (article 6)

=== Parliament and courts ===
French is the declared language of the legislature and courts in Quebec. Section 133 of the Constitution Act, 1867, still in effect, nonetheless requires that bills be printed, published, passed and assented to in French and English in the Parliament of Canada and the Legislature of Quebec.

French or English may be used by any person before the courts of Quebec. Parties may request the translation in French or English of the judgments by the courts or decisions rendered by any "body discharging quasi-judicial functions".

The French text prevails over the English one, in case of any discrepancy, for any regulation to which section 133 of the Constitution Act, 1867 does not apply.

The first version of the Charter provided that laws be enacted only in French. In 1979, the related provisions (articles 7 through 13) were rendered inoperative by a ruling of the Supreme Court of Canada in Attorney General of Quebec v. Blaikie; however, Quebec responded by re-enacting in French and in English the Charter of the French Language, leaving intact articles 7 through 13.

In 1993, the Charter's provisions related to the language of the legislature and courts were made compliant with the Supreme Court's ruling.

=== Civil administration ===
The government departments and agencies are designated by their French name alone, and all administrative documents are drafted and published in that official language. All communications by the administration with other governments and legal persons, between departments and internally inside departments, are conducted in the official language.

A person must have knowledge of the official language appropriate to the office for which he or she is applying.

A non-official language may be used on signs and posters of the administration, but only for health or public safety reasons.

=== Semi-public agencies ===
Public utilities and professional orders must provide service in the official language and use it for their internal and general communications. Professional orders may issue permits only to persons who have a knowledge of the official language appropriate to the practice of their profession.

=== Labour relations ===
Nineteen articles of the Charter provide for the general goal of making French the language of labour relations and ensuring each worker's right to work in French.

Employers are to draw up written communications to all or part of their staff, including after termination of the employment relationship, in French. They are also required to publish offers of employment, transfer or promotion in the official language. An employment contract must be provided in French first to a candidate if it falls under the definition of contracts of adhesion (i.e., a contract whose main provisions are not negotiable). It is only after the parties have examined the contract's French version that they may choose to be bound by its version in another language. Freely negotiated employment contracts may be drawn up in another language than French at the parties' express wish.

In particular, an employer cannot dismiss, lay off, demote, transfer or take reprisals against, or impose any other penalty on, a staff member on the sole account of he or she being exclusively French-speaking or of possessing insufficient knowledge of a non-official language, or because that member demanded the respect of his or her right to work in French. As a job requirement, knowledge or a specific level of knowledge of a language other than French is prohibited, unless the nature of the duties require it.

The Commission des normes, de l’équité, de la santé et de la sécurité du travail (Employment Standards, Equity, Health and Safety Commission) arbitrates in case of disagreement over the necessity of knowing a non-official language to perform a given work. The burden of the proof is on the employer, who must satisfy each the following criteria in order to meet the requirement of having taken all reasonable means to avoid requiring knowledge or a specific level of knowledge of a language other than the official language:

1. The employer assessed the actual language needs associated with the duties to be performed;
2. The employer made sure that the language knowledge already required from other staff members was insufficient for the performance of those duties; and
3. The employer restricted as much as possible the number of positions involving duties whose performance requires knowledge or a specific level of knowledge of a language other than the official language.

=== Commerce and business ===
Product labels, their instructions, manuals, warranty certificates as well as restaurant menus and wine lists must be in French. Other languages may be used, provided French's prominence is at least equivalent.

Catalogues, brochures, folders, commercial directories and other such publications must be in French. All software (for example, video games and operating systems) must be available in French unless no such version exists.

Signs and posters must be in French, and if they include any additional language, the French must be markedly predominant. A recognized trademark within the meaning of the Trademarks Act may appear exclusively in a language other than French unless a French version has been registered. Where a trademark is displayed outside a building exclusively in a language other than French, a sufficient presence of French must also be ensured.

A number of exceptions to the general rules for commercial products, signs and advertising:

- Products destined exclusively for export;
- Educational products for the teaching of a language other than French;
- Cultural and ideological companies, groups, signs, and literature (including non-French broadcasters and newspapers); and
- Companies (usually multinational corporations) that sign an agreement with the OQLF permitting an exemption from the francization requirement. (However, the rules regarding the right of a worker to work in French still apply.)

In some parts of Quebec, like Montreal, bilingual signs with French and English text of equal sizes can be seen (such as in historically English educational institutions, and in federally regulated businesses), although French is sometimes predominant on these signs. For example, French is located to the left of other languages so that it is read before the non-French text when reading left to right. (Formerly, the size and colour of text in other languages were tightly regulated as well.)

=== Application to indigenous languages ===
Though article 97 clarifies that while "the Indian reserves are not subject to this Act", the local indigenous languages are still subject to it off-reserve. For example, indigenous languages are not exempted from the application of article 58, whereby "public signs, advertising and posters must be in French", but may be in the local indigenous language "provided that French is markedly predominant".

Though article 58 does allow the provincial government to "determine by regulation the places, cases, conditions or circumstances ... where French need not be predominant or where such signs, posters and advertising may be in another language only", it imposes no obligation on the government to exempt indigenous languages.

=== Language of instruction ===
The language of instruction from kindergarten to secondary school is French. (The instruction language is the language in which the classes are taught. Learning of English as a second language is mandatory for all children attending French school beginning in elementary school.)

Articles 87, 88 and 89 provide for the use of Indigenous languages and Inuktitut as the language of instruction. The rate of introduction of French and English as languages of instruction is left to school committees and parents' committees.

At the request of parents, the following may receive instruction in English:

1. a child whose father or mother is a Canadian citizen and received elementary instruction in English anywhere in Canada, provided that that instruction constitutes the major part of the elementary instruction he or she received in Canada;
2. a child whose father or mother is a Canadian citizen and who has received or is receiving elementary or secondary instruction in English in Canada, and the brothers and sisters of that child, provided that that instruction constitutes the major part of the elementary or secondary instruction received by the child in Canada.

The original 1977 Charter provided for the English instruction not on the basis of a parent having received his instruction in English in Canada, but in Quebec only. This came to be amended following the adoption of the Constitution Act 1982, which defined the educational right of French and English minorities in all provinces under section 23 of the Canadian Charter of Rights and Freedoms.

== Office québécois de la langue française ==
The Office québécois de la langue française (Quebec Office of the French Language) (OQLF), informally known as the "language police", is the commission responsible for administering policies pertaining to linguistic officialization, toponymy and francization of civil administration and businesses. It also has the mission of "monitoring the linguistic situation in Quebec", promoting the official language and conducting research. In 2016–17, the budget of the OQLF was CA$24.1 million. The OQLF has seen, from time to time, criticism over some of its decisions, such as the 2013 controversy dubbed "pastagate", in which it cited an Italian restaurant for having on its menu Italian words like "pasta", "antipasti" and "calamari" rather than using their French equivalents. The OQLF has also objected to use of the term "grilled cheese sandwich", insisting that they be called "sandwich de fromage fondu", which literally translates to "melted cheese sandwich". Likewise, the OQLF objects to "on/off" switches and to the sale of "steaks", insisting that they be called "bifteck", despite the fact that "steak" is the more commonly used term by Francophones."

== Conseil supérieur de la langue française ==
The Conseil supérieur de la langue française (Superior Council of the French language) is an advisory body whose mission is "to advise the Minister responsible for the application of the Charter of the French Language on any question relative to the French language in Quebec". It works in close collaboration with equivalent bodies in France, Belgium and Switzerland.

== Legal dispute ==
Language in Canada is defined federally by the Official Languages Act since 1969 and is part of the Constitution of Canada since 1982. Parts of the Charter have been amended in response to rulings by Quebec Courts which were upheld by the Supreme Court of Canada.

Before 1982, the only part of the Charter of the French Language that could be challenged constitutionally was that of the language of legislation and the courts. It was challenged in 1979 by Peter Blaikie, Roland Durand and Yoine Goldstein (Attorney General of Quebec v. Blaikie).

In 1982, the patriation of the Canadian Constitution occurred as the British Parliament passed the Canada Act 1982. This act enacted the Constitution Act, 1982 for Canada (including the Canadian Charter of Rights and Freedoms); section 23 introduced the notion of "minority-language education rights". This opened another door to a constitutional dispute of the Charter.

Alliance Quebec, an anglophone rights lobby group, was founded in May 1982 and operated until 2005. It was mainly through this civil association that a number of lawyers have challenged the constitutionality of Quebec's territorial language policy.

A judge temporarily suspended two articles of Bill 96. The articles mandated companies to pay for the translation into French of legal documentation. Quebec Superior Court Justice Chantal Corriveau decided that requiring companies to pay for certified translation might delay some anglophone bodies from the right to access justice.

== Timeline of amendments ==
=== 1988 and 1993 amendments (Bills 178 and 86) ===
Bill 178 was passed in direct response to the legal case of Ford v. Quebec (Attorney General) and invoked the notwithstanding clause to shield the articles on business signage from judicial review. Because the law could not be challenged in Canadian courts due to the invocation of the notwithstanding clause, a group of English-rights activists instead filed a claim at the United Nations Human Rights Committee in 1989: in Ballantyne v Canada, the Quebec language law was found to have violated the rights of the complainants. In response, the Quebec Liberals introduced Bill 86 which made the Charter compliant with the Canadian court rulings without the need for the override provisions.

=== Proposed 2013 amendments (Bill 14) ===
In 2013 Diane De Courcy, the Minister responsible for the Charter of the French Language under Premier Pauline Marois of the Parti Québécois introduced Bill 14, An Act to Amend the Charter of the French Language, the Charter of Human Rights and Freedoms and Other Legislative Provisions. The bill would have made changes to both the Charter of the French Language and the Charter of Rights of Quebec.

Marois eventually withdrew the legislation in the face of criticism from Anglophone and Allophone Quebecers and the Quebec Liberal Party, and shifted focus to the Charter of Quebec Values. However, most of the details formed basis of the 2021 amendments.

=== 2021 amendments (Bill 96) ===
On August 26, 2020, Quebec's Minister of Justice and French Language, Simon Jolin-Barrette, announced plans for 2021 that would strengthen the Charter.

On May 12, 2021, the CAQ government of François Legault announced Bill 96, which strengthened the charter.

Bill 96 invoked the notwithstanding clause, allowing the law to temporarily override sections 2 and 7–15 of the Canadian Charter of Rights and Freedoms. The invocation expires five years after its use, or earlier if legislation is passed to repeal it sooner. At the point it expires, it may be renewed again by the Quebec National Assembly.

Some of the proposed measures were.

- Adding clauses to the Canadian Constitution, saying Quebec is a nation and that its official and common language is French.
- Forcing all commercial signage that includes non-French trademarks to include a "predominant" amount of French on all signs.
- Removing a municipality's bilingual status if census data shows that English is the first language for less than 50 per cent of its population, unless the municipality decides to maintain its status by passing a resolution to keep it.
- Creating the French Language Ministry and the position of French-Language Commissioner, as well as bolstering the role of the OQLF.
- Giving access to French training for those who are not obligated by law to go to school in French.
- Applying the charter to businesses with 25−49 employees and federal workplaces.

The leader of the Parti Québécois, Paul St-Pierre Plamondon, said he supported aspects of the bill, but felt it did not go far enough, saying, "Unfortunately, the CAQ gave us the absolute minimum." A few days later PQ announced their plan if elected, which would include

- cutting off funding to companies that do not respect their obligations when it comes to using French
- subjecting CEGEPs to the charter, imposing a uniform French exam on English-speaking CEGEP students
- lowering immigration thresholds.

According to a poll by Léger published on May 22, among Francophones the approval rate for the various proposals was fluctuating between 72% and 95%.

Protests against the bill included "several thousand" people in Montreal and Indigenous youth.

Bill 96 was adopted on May 24, 2022, with 78 MNAs in favour (from the CAQ and Québec solidaire) and 29 against (from the Liberal Party and Parti Québécois). It received royal assent from Lieutenant Governor J. Michel Doyon on June 1, and subsequently became law.

== Criticism ==
The Charter was criticized by Prime Minister Pierre Trudeau, who called Bourassa's Bill 22 as a "slap in the face", in his memoirs, as he saw it as contrary to the federal government's initiative to mandate bilingualism.

Following the advice of the Royal Commission on Bilingualism and Biculturalism, Ontario's premier John Robarts made French an official language of the provincial legislature in 1970. While the Victoria Charter was being negotiated between the provincial premiers and the federal government, Robarts agreed that the province would recognize Franco-Ontarians' rights to access provincial public service in the French language, and for French-speakers to receive the services of an interpreter, if needed, in Ontario's courts. However, plans to adopt these measures were abandoned after negotiations for the Victoria Charter collapsed. His successor, Bill Davis, instead opted to simply provide legal services in French, with the issuance of bilingual drivers licences and government documents.

Political opposition to the Charter and earlier language legislation has had limited success, given the support of the laws by the Parti Québécois and Quebec Liberal Party. Legislative initiatives prior to Bill 101 such as An Act to promote the French language in Quebec (Bill 63) were often perceived by francophones as insufficient. After Bourassa passed the Official Language Act, opponents turned their support to the Union Nationale in the 1976 election, but despite that short resurgence of support, the party collapsed in the subsequent election. Court challenges have been more successful: Many of the key provisions of the initial language legislation having been rewritten to comply with rulings. Despite compliance since 1993 of the Charter with the Canadian Constitution, opposition to the Charter and the government body enforcing it has continued.

According to Statistics Canada, up to 244,000 English-speaking people have emigrated from Quebec to other provinces since the 1970s; those in Quebec whose sole native language was English dropped from 789,000 in 1971 to 575,555 in 2006, when they accounted for 7.6% of the population. Altogether, in 2006, 744,430 (10%) used mostly English as their home language, and 918,955 (12.2%) comprised the Official Language Minority, having English as their first official language spoken. When many anglophones relocated outside of Quebec after the introduction of the Charter in the 1970s, several English-language schools in Montreal closed their doors. These school closures may also have been brought about by restrictions on who can attend English schools, which has been another ongoing drain on the English school system. Of the Anglophones between 25 and 44 years old who left the province between 1981 and 1986, 15,000 individuals, which was half of this group, had university degrees. The province's unemployment rate rose from 8.7 per cent in 1976 to 10.4 per cent in 1977, remaining above 10 per cent for 19 of the last 23 years of the 20th century. The language barrier has also been regarded as a "soft cap" for population growth; for instance from 2013 to 2014 while Montreal gained around 43,000 immigrants from other parts of the world it lost 10,000 residents to other provinces.

Many companies, most notably Sun Life, Royal Bank and Bank of Montreal (which even considered removing "Montreal" from its name), moved their major operations to Toronto as a consequence of the adoption of the Charter. This concerted fleeing of business and subsequent loss of thousands of jobs is believed to have hindered Quebec's economy and allowed Toronto to overtake Montreal as Canada's business centre. On the other hand, Toronto's advantage had been growing since the 1930s and had become apparent in the 1950s, and is also related to the greater importance of the United States, rather than Britain, in Canada's economy. This action may have simply accelerated, rather than allowed, this change of status between the two cities.

Levying fines of up to $7000 per offence, Charter enforcers were widely labelled in the English media as the "language police" or "tongue troopers". While the Office québécois de la langue française (OQLF) provides several warnings before resorting to legal sanctions, allegations that it has abused its powers have led to charges of racism and harassment. The OQLF took action against stores retailing imported kosher goods that did not meet its labelling requirements, an action perceived in the Jewish community as an unfair targeting that coincided with a high-profile case against the well-known Schwartz's delicatessen, the owner of which was subjected to failed legal action by the OQLF due to the apostrophe in his sign, which remains. In the mid-1980s, another delicatessen, Dunn's, got in trouble for having the English phrase smoked meat on the sign out front. The manager at the time stated that Parti Québécois MNA Gérald Godin himself ordered the sandwich by its name. Dunn's also fought a ruling to change the name of smoked meat to bœuf mariné to conform to the charter. Dunn's won the ruling by appeal by proving that if they did not advertise smoked meat they would confuse and anger customers. Due to the work of Myer Dunn, under the ruling in 1987, smoked meat became a word in both official languages of Canada. In 2002, there were reported cases of harassment of allophone merchants who refused to speak French.

The 2004 annual report of the OQLF was criticized by a columnist of The Gazette who alleged that there was a "totalitarian mindset in the bureaucracy". The columnist complained of sections of the report which described the continued prevalence of languages other than French in two-thirds of Montreal's households as an "alarming" trend that would present a formidable challenge to francophones in Montreal. In reality, the report said it was alarming that adoption of English as a home language by allophones grew faster than the adoption of French as a home language.

The use of the notwithstanding clause in the 1990s to circumvent the Canadian Charter of Rights and Freedoms with regards to signage also resulted in reactions from other Canadian provinces; the syndrome de Sault Ste. Marie was a series of symbolic but divisive resolutions by some municipalities outside Quebec declaring their towns unilingually English in protest of what they saw as an infringement on the rights embodied in the charter. It is often believed that the controversy over the Charter was what influenced the Meech Lake Accord and Charlottetown Accord to fail. The Supreme Court in their ruling regarding the signs case which led to the use of the notwithstanding clause, ruled that in fact any sign law was a violation of the freedom of expression right.

Aside from the civil rights infringement, the Charter has faced legal challenges because the restricted education opportunities have hindered not only unilingual but bilingual anglophones' employment. Although the Charter made French the official language of government and civil administration, the same cannot be said of the private sector. Despite over 40 years of the Charter, it has never been applied as rigorously as intended because to do so would violate civil liberties. English is still often made a requirement by employers in Montreal, including many French-Canadian owned ones, and, to a lesser extent, in Gatineau and Quebec City, with the workforce in Montreal remaining largely bilingual.

On November 14, 1988, the political and human rights watchdog organization Freedom House published "The Doctrine of 'Preponderance of Blood' in South Africa, the Soviet Union and Quebec" in its journal Exchange. Introduced by Zbigniew Brzezinski (an anglophone who had once lived in Montreal) former U.S. President Jimmy Carter's National Security adviser, the essay compared the language of instruction provisions of the charter with South African apartheid statutes and jurisprudence. However, the Supreme Court of Canada disagreed with the discrimination-based-on-ancestry argument under the Quebec Charter of Human Rights and Freedoms in Gosselin (Tutor of) v. Quebec (Attorney General), believing that it conflicted with section 23 of the Canadian Charter of Rights and Freedoms. The criteria used by Quebec to determine if parents are entitled to have their children instructed in English are the same as those found under section 23 of the Canadian Charter of Rights and Freedoms.

== Influence abroad ==
The 2001 report of the Estates-General on the Situation and Future of the French Language in Quebec identified the negative perception of Quebec's language policy in the rest of Canada and the United States as a problem to solve. It stated:

In Canada and abroad, the linguistic policy of Quebec is too often negatively perceived. The business community and the media, in particular, know it very little. For their part, the Americans remain opposed to legislation that appears to them to reduce individual liberties and limit the use of English. For them, language and culture are two separate elements, they do not see how the protection of Quebec culture also includes the protection of the French language, even though 35 American States have adopted declarations proclaiming English the official language. Thus, must be developed the perception that Quebec culture is a part of the North-American heritage and that it is necessary to preserve it. It is also important to correct the erroneous perceptions regarding the Quebec language policy and its application.

Recommendation 147 of the report suggested the creation of an institutional television and radio campaign targeting both Quebec citizens and certain groups abroad to inform on the state of French in North America and the language policy of Quebec. Recommendation 148 suggested the creation of a watchdog to correct errors made "both in good faith and bad faith" in the media.

As part of the effort to improve how its policies are perceived, the OQLF conducted an inquiry on the influence of Quebec's language policy abroad in countries where the fragility of certain languages prompted the use of legislative measures. It requested and published the opinions of various experts from Spain, Israel, the United States, Estonia, Latvia and Lithuania, Wales, Australia and Flanders in a special issue of the OQLF's Revue d'aménagement linguistique celebrating the 25th anniversary of the Charter in 2002.

Jonas Žilinskas, a lecturer at University of Šiauliai in Lithuania described the state of the Lithuanian language after a prolonged Russian rule over his country:

One proclaimed a policy of bilingualism which was expressed only by the obligation made to Lithuanians to learn Russian while Russians did not bother to learn Lithuanian. If the written Lithuanian language were more or less protected by writers through newspapers and publishers, the spoken Lithuanian language was degraded. Often, in the institutions, it was only a language of oral communication, the greatest part of technical documentation and correspondence being written in Russian.

This "false bilingualism" was followed by the Sąjūdis movement, during which the government of Lithuania declared their language the sole official language and began working on a language policy modelled on the experience of Quebec.

Mart Rannut, vice-dean of research at the Department of Philology of the University of Tallinn, in Estonia, recalled the influence of Quebec's expertise in the field of linguistic human rights and language planning which helped countries that have gained independence from the Soviet Union and concluded that "Bill 101 indirectly touched one-sixth of the planet".

Ina Druviete, at the time dean of the department of sociolinguistics at the Linguistic Institute of Latvia, noted the similarities between the language policies in all three Baltic states (which have large, if often officially unrecognized, Russophone minorities) and that of Quebec. All policies aiming "to prevent language shifts and to modify the hierarchy of languages in the public life. The principal sectors of intervention were the language used in the government agencies and the administration, in meetings and office spaces in particular, in corporate names, information and education. The principle of territorial linguistic rights was instituted."

In Wales, the language policy of Quebec had a great influence, but a similar policy could not be implemented as it was in the Baltic States, because Welsh speakers do not form a majority in this constituent country of the United Kingdom. According to Colin H. Williams, professor and researcher at the Welsh Department of Cardiff University particular lessons followed in Wales which stem from the experience of Quebec are:

- The acquisition of detailed census data and explanatory facts aiming at clarifying the public discussion
- The linguistic legislation (official language status, right to speak Welsh before the court, Welsh Language Board responsible to administer the law)
- The iconography of the linguistic landscape
- The progress in the teaching of the Welsh language

In Israel, while the "penetration of English in the sociolinguistic organization of the country" is perceived, according to Bernard Spolsky, professor emeritus of English at the Bar-Ilan University, as a threat to Hebrew, the language policy has thus far only influenced linguists and some politicians. He writes:

Periodically, Israeli politicians present bills to proclaim Hebrew the sole official language of the country. Presently, Hebrew shares this title with Arabic only, because a measure was taken soon after the foundation of the State, in 1948, to modify the British policy, which imposed three languages, and gave up English. The last attempt at giving a judicial protection to Hebrew goes back to December 2000: two bills were then rejected.

In Catalonia, according to Miquel Reniu i Tresserras, president of the Comissió de Lectorats and former chief executive officer of the Catalan language policy, Quebec's legislation constituted a "reference model" and the OQLF and the equivalent body in Catalonia were in close collaboration.

== See also ==
- Language demographics of Quebec
- Language policy
- Minority language
- French language
- English-speaking Quebecers
- Children of Bill 101
- Official bilingualism in Canada
- Toubon Law
- Ford v. Quebec
- Devine v. Quebec
