= History of Quebec =

Quebec was first settled by Paleo-Indians after the Laurentide Ice Sheet melted, roughly 11,000 years ago. They lived as nomads, surviving by hunting, fishing, and gathering. By the 1500s eleven First Nations peoples had formed: Inuit, Abenaki, Algonquin, Atikamekw, Cree, Huron-Wendat, Wolastoqiyik, Mi'kmaq, Haudenosaunee, Innu and Naskapi.

The first European explorers reached the area in the early 16th century. Giovanni da Verrazzano's 1522–23 voyage for France applied the name New France to northeastern North America. Jacques Cartier landed at Gaspé on July 24, 1534, and on his 1535 voyage named the Stadacona district Canada. From about 1580 the fur trade revived French interest. Coureurs des bois and Catholic missionaries followed, forming alliances with some Indigenous nations against others (the later Iroquois Wars).

Samuel de Champlain founded the Habitation de Québec (now Quebec City) on July 3, 1608, and it became the capital of New France. After a brief English occupation (1629–1632) it was returned by the Treaty of Saint-Germain-en-Laye. Maisonneuve founded Ville-Marie (now Montreal) in 1642. New France became a royal province in 1663. Relations with the Haudenosaunee and with Britain stayed turbulent through the Iroquois Wars and the Intercolonial Wars. British forces took Quebec City in 1759 and Montreal in 1760; France ceded the colony in the 1763 Treaty of Paris.

In 1791 Britain divided the Province of Quebec into Upper Canada and Lower Canada, giving Loyalist settlers English common law in the west while Lower Canada kept French civil law and the seigneurial system. Conflict continued into the Lower Canada Rebellion of 1837–38 and into disputes over representation. In 1867 the colony entered Confederation as the province of Quebec; the first premier was Pierre-Joseph-Olivier Chauveau. Montreal was Canada's largest city for the next century. The Catholic Church remained a central institution for French speakers; "O Canada" was written for the 1880 Saint-Jean-Baptiste celebrations.

In the early 20th century Quebec reached its present northern limits (Ungava, 1912), and the first statute requiring French in public life was adopted. In the First World War voluntary enlistment among French Quebecers was low; conscription in 1917 produced the Conscription Crisis of 1917 and riots in Quebec City. A second conscription crisis followed in 1944.

In the 1960s the Quiet Revolution under a Liberal government expanded the welfare state, reduced the Church's role in schools and social services, and nationalized electricity (Hydro-Québec). Québécois identity and Quebec nationalism became central politics. The Parti Québécois later took office and pressed for greater autonomy. Sovereignty referendums in 1980 and 1995 both failed to win a majority.

== Indigenous peoples and European expeditions (pre-1608) ==
The Paleo-Indians were the first to establish themselves in what became Quebec, arriving after the Laurentide Ice Sheet melted roughly 11,000 years ago. By the 1500s, eleven Indigenous peoples had formed: the Inuit and ten First Nations – the Abenaki, Algonquin (or Anichinabés), Atikamekw, Cree, Huron/Wendat, Wolastoqiyik, Miꞌkmaq, Haudenosaunee, Innu and Naskapi . Algonquians organized into seven political entities and lived as nomads,surviving by hunting, gathering, and fishing. Inuit fished and hunted whales and seals along the coasts of Hudson and Ungava Bays.

Around 1522–23, Giovanni da Verrazzano persuaded King Francis I of France to commission an expedition to find a western route to Cathay (China) via a Northwest Passage. Though this expedition was unsuccessful, it bestowed the name New France on northeast North America. Jacques Cartier became the first European explorer to discover and map the Quebec area when he landed in Gaspé on July 24, 1534. In the second expedition, in 1535, Cartier explored the lands of Stadacona and named the village and its surrounding territories Canada (from kanata, 'village' in Iroquoian). Cartier returned to France with about 10 St. Lawrence Iroquoians, including Chief Donnacona. In 1540, Donnacona recounted to Francis the legend of the Kingdom of Saguenay, inspiring him to order a third expedition, this time led by Jean-François de La Rocque de Roberval; it failed to find the kingdom.

After these expeditions, France mostly abandoned North America for 50 years because of its financial crisis; France was involved in the Italian Wars and religious wars. Around 1580, the rise of the fur trade reignited French interest; New France became a colonial trading post. In 1603, Samuel de Champlain travelled to the Saint Lawrence River and, on Pointe Saint-Mathieu, established a defence pact with the Innu, Wolastoqiyik and Mi'kmaq, that would be "a decisive factor in the maintenance of a French colonial enterprise in America despite an enormous numerical disadvantage vis-à-vis the British". Thus began French military support to the Algonquian and Wendat peoples against Haudenosaunee attacks; these became known as the Iroquois Wars and lasted from the early 1600s to the early 1700s.

== New France (1608–1763) ==
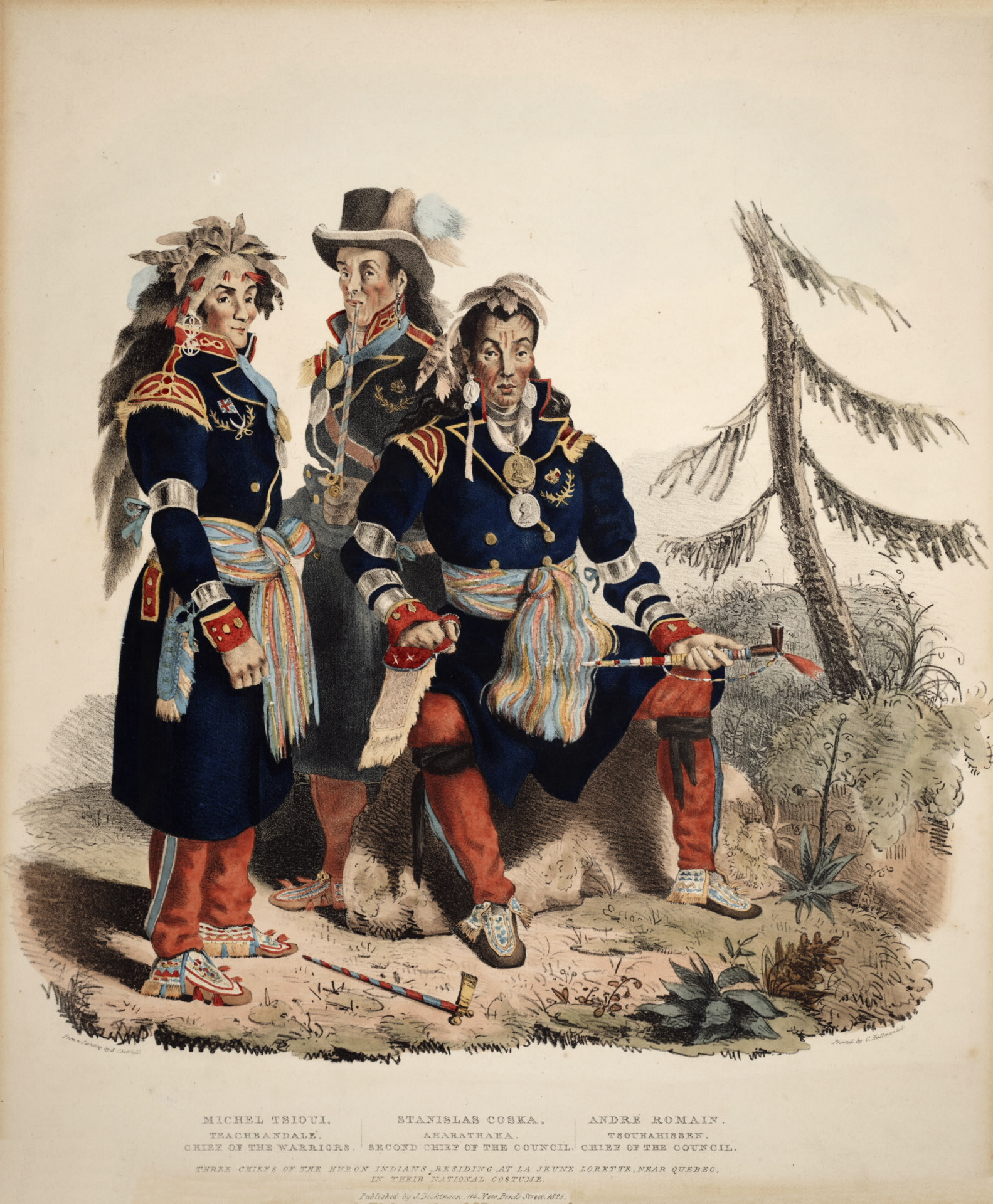
Three Huron-Wendat chiefs from Wendake. New France had largely peaceful relations with the Indigenous people, such as their allies the Huron. After the defeat of the Huron by their mutual enemy, the Haudenosaunee, many fled from Ontario to Quebec.

In 1608, Samuel de Champlain returned to the region as head of an exploration party. On July 3, 1608, with the support of King Henry IV, he founded the Habitation de Québec (now Quebec City) and made it the capital of New France. The settlement became a permanent fur trading outpost, where First Nations traded furs for French goods, such as metal objects, guns, alcohol, and clothing. Missionary groups arrived after the founding of Quebec City. Coureurs des bois and Catholic missionaries used canoes to explore the interior and establish fur trading forts.

The Compagnie des Cent-Associés, which had been granted a royal mandate to manage New France in 1627, introduced the Custom of Paris and the seigneurial system, and forbade settlement by anyone other than Catholics. In 1629, Quebec City surrendered, without battle, to English privateers during the Anglo-French War; in 1632, the English king agreed to return it with the Treaty of Saint-Germain-en-Laye. Trois-Rivières was founded at de Champlain's request in 1634. Paul de Chomedey de Maisonneuve founded Ville-Marie (now Montreal) in 1642.

In 1663, the Company of New France ceded Canada to King Louis XIV, who made New France into a royal province. New France became a true colony administered by the Sovereign Council of New France from Quebec City. A governor-general governed Canada and its administrative dependencies: Acadia, Louisiana and Plaisance. French settlers were mostly farmers and known as "Canadiens" or "Habitants". Though immigration was modest, the colony grew via the Habitants' high birth rates. In 1665, the Carignan-Salières regiment developed the string of fortifications known as the "Valley of Forts" to protect against Iroquois invasions and brought with them 1,200 new men. To redress the gender imbalance and boost population growth, King Louis XIV sponsored the passage of approximately 800 young French women (King's Daughters) to the colony. In 1666, intendant Jean Talon organized the first census and counted 3,215 Habitants. Talon enacted policies to diversify agriculture and encourage births, which, by 1672, had increased the population to 6,700.

New France's territory grew to extend from Hudson Bay to the Gulf of Mexico, and encompassed the Great Lakes. In the early 1700s, Governor Callières concluded the Great Peace of Montreal, which confirmed the alliance between the Algonquian and New France and definitively ended the Iroquois Wars. From 1688 onwards, the competition between the French and British to control North America's interior and monopolize fur trade pitted New France and its indigenous allies against the Haudenosaunee and English in four successive wars called the Intercolonial Wars in Quebec and the French and Indian Wars by Americans. The first three were King William's War (1688–1697), Queen Anne's War (1702–1713), and King George's War (1744–1748). In 1713, following the Peace of Utrecht, the Duke of Orléans ceded Acadia and Plaisance Bay to Great Britain, but retained Île Saint-Jean, and Île-Royale where the Fortress of Louisbourg was later erected. These losses were significant since Plaisance Bay was the primary communication route to France, and Acadia contained 5,000 French Acadians. In the siege of Louisbourg (1745), the British were victorious, but returned the city to France after war concessions.

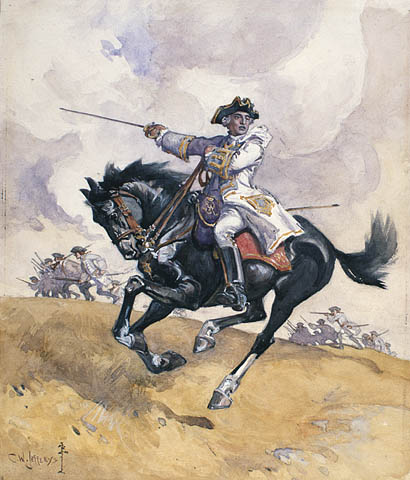
Montcalm leading his troops into battle. Watercolour by Charles William Jefferys.

The last of the four wars was the Seven Years' War ("The War of the Conquest" in Quebec) and lasted from 1754 to 1763. In 1754, tensions escalated for control of the Ohio Valley, as authorities in New France became more aggressive in efforts to expel British traders and colonists. In 1755, Governor Charles Lawrence and Officer Robert Monckton ordered the forceful expulsion of the Acadians. In 1758, on Île-Royale, British General James Wolfe besieged and captured the Fortress of Louisbourg. This allowed him to control access to the Gulf of St. Lawrence through the Cabot Strait. In 1759, he besieged Quebec for three months from Île d'Orléans. Then, Wolfe stormed Quebec and fought Montcalm for control of the city in the Battle of the Plains of Abraham. After a British victory, the king's lieutenant and Lord of Ramezay concluded the Articles of Capitulation of Quebec. During the spring of 1760, the Chevalier de Lévis besieged Quebec City and forced the British to entrench themselves during the Battle of Sainte-Foy. However, loss of French vessels sent to resupply New France after the fall of Quebec City during the Battle of Restigouche marked the end of France's efforts to retake the colony. Governor Pierre de Rigaud, marquis de Vaudreuil-Cavagnial signed the Articles of Capitulation of Montreal on September 8, 1760.

While awaiting the results of the Seven Years' War in Europe, New France was put under a British military regime led by Governor James Murray. In 1762, Commander Jeffery Amherst ended French colonial presence in Newfoundland at the Battle of Signal Hill. France secretly ceded the western part of Louisiana and the Mississippi River Delta to Spain via the 1762 Treaty of Fontainebleau. On February 10, 1763, the Treaty of Paris concluded the war. France ceded its North American possessions to Britain. Thus, France ended New France and abandoned the remaining 60,000 Canadiens, who sided with the Catholic clergy in refusing to swear fealty to the British Crown. The rupture from France provoked a transformation within the descendants of the Canadiens that eventually resulted in the birth of a new nation.

== British North America (1763–1867) ==
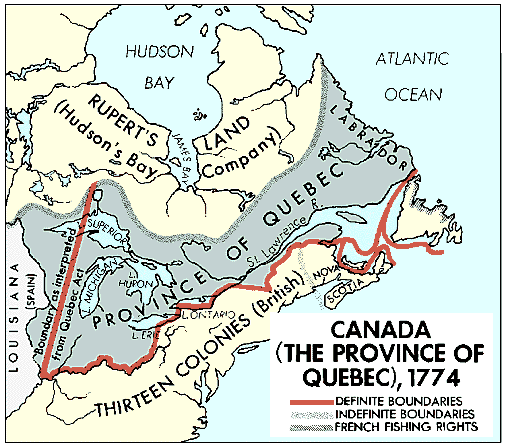
The Province of Quebec in 1774

In 1763, the Royal Proclamation established a constitution for the newly acquired territory. The Canadiens became part of the British Empire and circumscribed to a region of the St. Lawrence Valley and Anticosti Island called the Province of Quebec. With unrest growing to the south, the British were worried that the Canadiens might support the unrest. To secure their allegiance, Governor James Murray and later Governor Guy Carleton promoted the need for accommodations, resulting in the Quebec Act of 1774. This act allowed Canadiens to regain their civil customs, return to the seigneural system, regain other rights including use of French, and reappropriate their old territories: Labrador, the Great Lakes, the Ohio Valley, Illinois Country and the Indian Territory.

As early as 1774, the Continental Congress of the Thirteen Colonies attempted to rally the Canadiens to its cause. However, its military troops failed to defeat the British counteroffensive during its Invasion of Quebec in 1775. Most Canadiens remained neutral, though some regiments allied with the Americans in the Saratoga campaign of 1777. When the British recognized the independence of the rebel colonies via the Treaty of Paris of 1783, it ceded Illinois and the Ohio Valley to the newly formed United States and denoted the 45th parallel as its border, drastically shrinking Quebec.

Some United Empire Loyalists from the US migrated to Quebec. Dissatisfied with the legal rights under the French seigneurial regime then followed in Quebec, and wanting to use the more familiar British legal system, the Loyalists protested to British authorities until the Constitutional Act of 1791 was enacted, dividing Quebec into two colonies separated by the Ottawa River: Upper Canada to the west (predominantly Anglo-Protestant) and Lower Canada to the east (Franco-Catholic). Lower Canada's lands consisted of the coasts of the Saint Lawrence River, Labrador and Anticosti Island, with the territory extending north to Rupert's Land, and south, east and west to the borders with the US, New Brunswick, and Upper Canada. The creation of Upper and Lower Canada allowed Loyalists to live under British laws and institutions, while Canadiens maintained French civil law and Catholic religion. Governor Haldimand drew Loyalists away from Quebec City and Montreal by offering free land on the north shore of Lake Ontario to anyone willing to swear allegiance to George III. During the War of 1812, Charles-Michel de Salaberry became a hero by leading Canadian troops to victory at the Battle of the Chateauguay. This loss caused the Americans to abandon the Saint Lawrence Campaign, their strategic effort to conquer Canada.

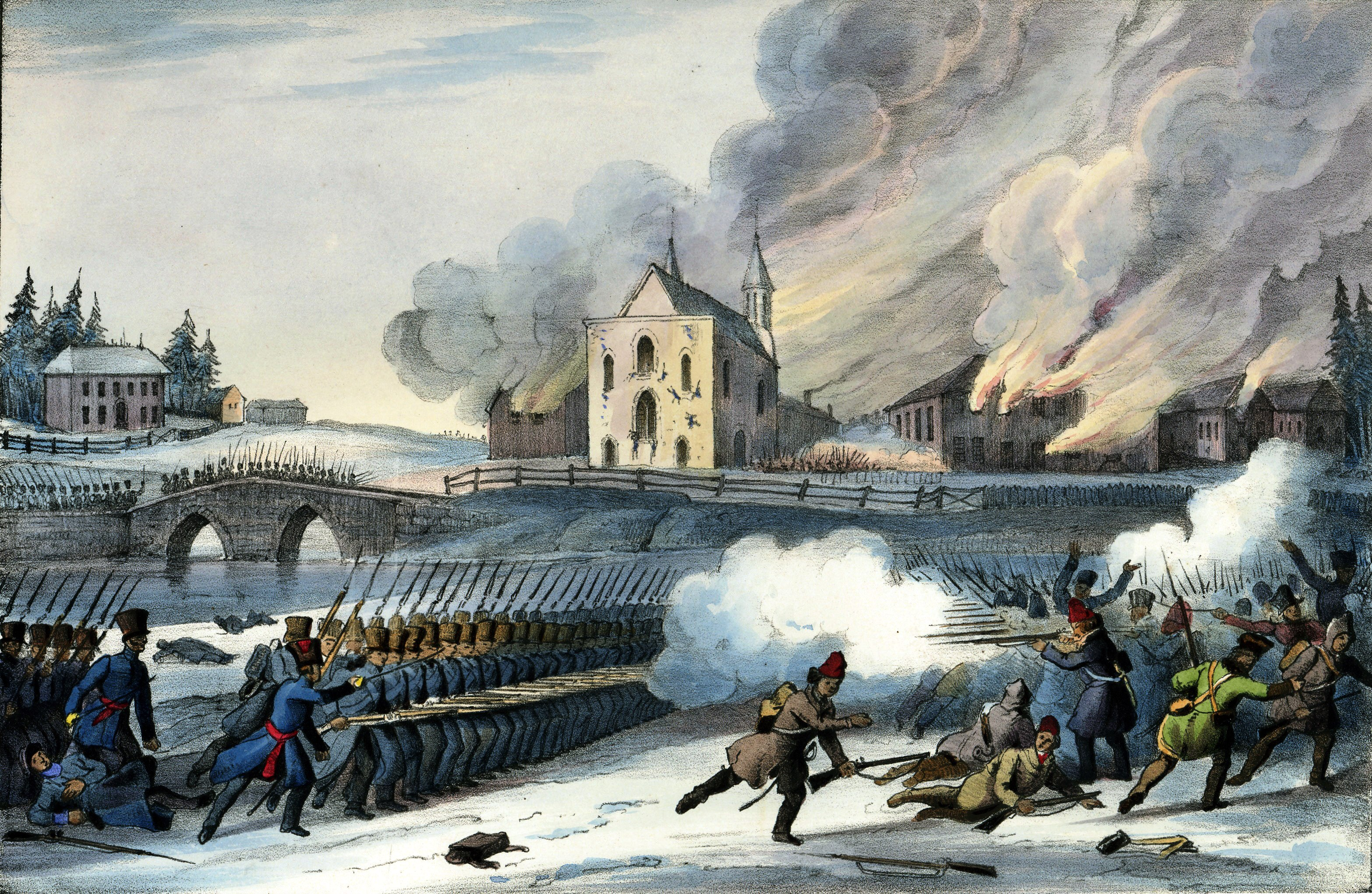
The Battle of Saint-Eustache was the final battle of the Lower Canada Rebellion.

Gradually, the Legislative Assembly of Lower Canada came into conflict with the superior authority of the Crown and its appointed representatives. Starting in 1791, the government of Lower Canada was criticized and contested by Parti canadien. In 1834, the Parti canadien presented its 92 resolutions, political demands that expressed loss of confidence in the British monarchy. Discontentment intensified throughout the public meetings of 1837, and the Lower Canada Rebellion began in 1837. In 1837, Louis-Joseph Papineau and Robert Nelson led residents of Lower Canada to form the Patriotes, an armed group. They declared independence in 1838, guaranteeing rights and equality for all citizens without discrimination. Their actions triggered rebellions in both Lower and Upper Canada. The Patriotes were victorious in their first battle, the Battle of Saint-Denis. However, they were disorganized and badly equipped, leading to their loss against the British army in the Battle of Saint-Charles, and defeat in the Battle of Saint-Eustache.

In response to the rebellions, Lord Durham was asked to undertake a study and prepare a report to Parliament. Durham recommended that Canadiens be culturally assimilated, with English as their only official language. To do this, the British passed the Act of Union 1840, which merged Upper Canada and Lower Canada into a single colony: the Province of Canada. Lower Canada became the francophone and densely populated Canada East, and Upper Canada became the anglophone and sparsely populated Canada West. This union, unsurprisingly, was the main source of political instability until 1867. Despite their population gap, Canada East and Canada West obtained an identical number of seats in the Legislative Assembly of the Province of Canada, which created representation problems. Initially, equal legislative representation underrepresented Canada East due to its larger population. Heavy immigration from the British Isles to Canada West later reversed this demographic balance, leaving Canada West underrepresented under the same framework. The representation issues were called into question by debates on representation by population. Around this period, the British population appropriated the term Canadian to refer to themselves. The French population, who had thus far been "the Canadians", began to be identified with their ethnic community under the name "French Canadian" as they were a "French of Canada".

Access to new lands was problematic because they were monopolized by the Château Clique, causing an exodus of Canadiens towards New England for the next hundred years. This phenomenon is known as the Grande Hémorragie and threatened the survival of the Canadien nation. The massive British immigration ordered from London that followed the failed rebellion compounded this. To combat it, the Church adopted the revenge of the cradle policy. In 1844, the capital of the Province of Canada was moved from Kingston to Montreal. During Ireland's Great Potato Famine (1845–1852), nearly 100,000 Irish refugees passed through Grosse Isle's quarantine station, with many settling in Quebec and integrating into French-Canadian society.

Political unrest came to a head in 1849, when English Canadian rioters set fire to the Parliament Building in Montreal following the enactment of the Rebellion Losses Bill, a law that compensated French Canadians whose properties were destroyed during the rebellions of 1837–1838. This bill, resulting from the Baldwin-La Fontaine coalition and Lord Elgin's advice, was important as it established the notion of responsible government. In 1854, the seigneurial system was abolished, the Grand Trunk Railway was built, and the Canadian–American Reciprocity Treaty was implemented. In 1866, the Civil Code of Lower Canada was adopted.

== Traditional Quebec (1867–1960) ==
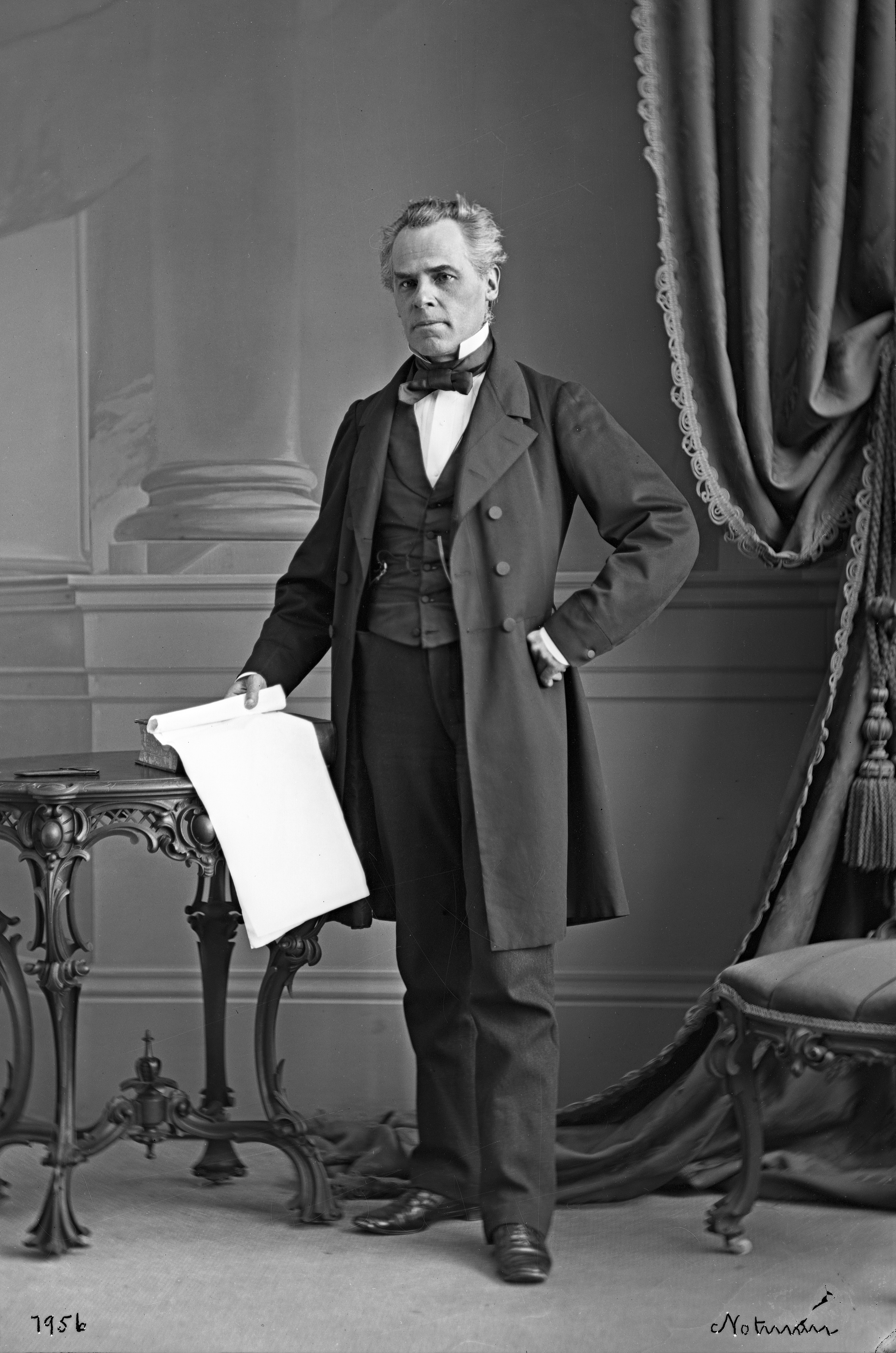
George-Étienne Cartier, co-premier from Canada East and a Father of Confederation

In 1864, negotiations began for Canadian Confederation between the Province of Canada, New Brunswick and Nova Scotia at the Charlottetown Conference and Quebec Conference.

After having fought as a Patriote, George-Étienne Cartier entered politics in the Province of Canada, becoming one of the co-premiers and advocate for the union of the British North American provinces. He became a leading figure at the Quebec Conference, which produced the Quebec Resolutions, the foundation for Canadian Confederation. Recognized as a Father of Confederation, he successfully argued for the establishment of the province of Quebec, initially composed of the historic heart of the territory of the French Canadian nation.

Following the London Conference of 1866, the Quebec Resolutions were implemented as the British North America Act, 1867, and brought into force on July 1, 1867, creating the nation of Canada, composed of four provinces: New Brunswick, Nova Scotia, Ontario and Quebec. These last two came from splitting the Province of Canada, and used the old borders of Lower Canada for Quebec, and Upper Canada for Ontario. On July 15, 1867, Pierre-Joseph-Olivier Chauveau became Quebec's first premier.

Between the late 19th and the late 20th century, Montreal was Canada's most populous city, including its economic and cultural centre. It was, as such, often among the first to adopt new technologies. It launched Canada's first public transit system in 1861 with horse-drawn streetcars, started a telephone service in 1878, and began generating electricity in 1885.

The new Dominion quickly became interested in expansionism, especially westward, purchasing Rupert's Land from the Hudson's Bay Company in 1870. In 1885, it fought against the francophone Métis in the North-West Rebellion, and did not grant clemency to Louis Riel, their leader, after he was sentenced to death. This caused several Quebec liberal and conservative MLAs to form the Parti National out of anger. This, in combination with the Manitoba Schools Question, also helped turn the rights of French Canadians into an important concern. Gradually gaining in popularity, clerico-nationalists – who promoted the Triple Ideal of Catholicism, French, and rural life, alongside other traditional values (e.g., traditional gender roles, resistance to cultural assimilation, anti-progressivism, and hierarchy) – wielded significant influence until the 1960s.

Montreal continued its expansions into new advances by introducing streetcars in 1892 and seeing bikes and automobiles populate its roads by the 1890s and 1900s respectively. The Canadian Parliament, meanwhile, expanded Quebec in 1898 by enacting the Quebec Boundary Extension Act, 1898, which added part of Rupert's Land.

Under the aegis of the Catholic Church and the political action of Henri Bourassa, symbols of French Canadian national pride were developed, like the Flag of Carillon, and "O Canada" – a patriotic song composed for Saint-Jean-Baptiste Day. Many organizations to consecrate the affirmation of the French-Canadian people, including the caisses populaires Desjardins in 1900, the Club de hockey Canadien in 1909, Le Devoir in 1910, the Congress on the French language in Canada in 1912, and L'Action nationale in 1917. In 1909, the Quebec government passed a law obligating wood and pulp to be transformed in Quebec, which helped slow the Grande Hémorragie by allowing Quebec to export its finished products to the US instead of its labourers. In 1910, Armand Lavergne passed the Lavergne Law, the first language legislation in Quebec, which required the use of French alongside English on tickets, documents, bills and contracts issued by transport and public utility companies. At this time, companies rarely recognized the majority language of Quebec. This movement may be why Ontario's Regulation 17 (1912–1927) was fought until its repeal.

In 1912, the Canadian Parliament enacted the Quebec Boundaries Extension Act, 1912, which gave Quebec its final extension: another part of Rupert's Land called the District of Ungava. Quebec's borders then reached the Hudson Strait and vaguely interlapped with Labrador's.

When the First World War broke out in 1914, Canada was involved and many English Canadians volunteered. However, because they did not feel the same connection to the British Empire and absent a direct threat to Canada, most French Canadians saw no reason to fight. By late 1916, casualties and waning numbers of volunteers were beginning to cause reinforcement problems. Although almost every French-speaking MP opposed conscription, while almost all English-speaking MPs supported it, the Military Service Act, 1917 became law on August 29, 1917. French Canadians protested, creating the Conscription Crisis of 1917, which led to the Quebec riot.

In 1919, the prohibition of spirits was enacted following a provincial referendum. In 1920, Montreal hosted Canada's first public radio broadcast. However, in 1921 prohibition was abolished by the Alcoholic Beverages Act, which created the SAQ and allowed the government to regulate the sale of alcohol. Quebec had the shortest and weakest prohibition in North America, as well as profiting from sale to tourists. Since the border between Quebec and Labrador had never been formalized, in 1927, the British Judicial Committee of the Privy Council gathered to draw one. However, the Quebec government did not recognize the ruling, resulting in a continuing boundary dispute.

In 1931, the Statute of Westminster was enacted, which confirmed the autonomy of the Dominions – including Canada and its provinces – from the UK, as well as their free association in the Commonwealth of Nations. In the 1930s, Quebec's economy was affected by the Great Depression because of reduced US demand for Quebec products. Between 1929 and 1932, the unemployment rate tripled, from 8% to 26%. In an attempt to remedy this, the Quebec government enacted infrastructure projects, campaigns to colonize distant regions, financial assistance to farmers, and the secours directs – the ancestor to Canada's Employment Insurance. The Depression ended the Grande Hémorragie.

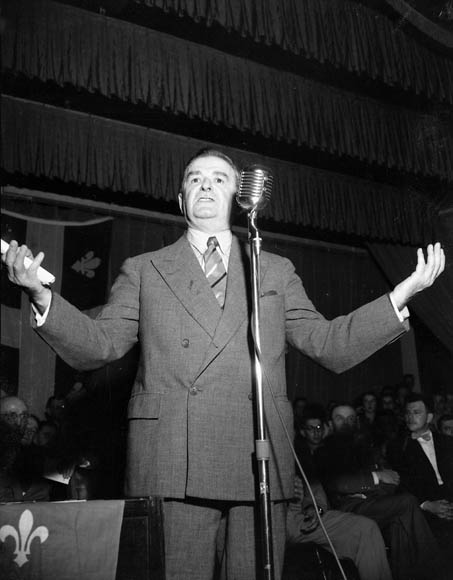
Maurice Duplessis, premier of Quebec from 1936 to 1939 and during the Grande Noirceur. He passed in 1959.

French Canadians remained opposed to conscription during the Second World War. When Canada declared war in September 1939, the federal government pledged not to conscript soldiers for overseas service. As the war went on, more and more English Canadians voiced support for conscription, despite opposition from French Canada. Following a 1942 poll that showed 73% of Quebec's residents were against conscription, while 80% or more were for conscription in every other province, the federal government passed Bill 80, which allowed conscription for overseas service. In the Conscription Crisis of 1944 the Bloc Populaire emerged to fight conscription. The stark differences between the values of French and English Canada popularized the expression the "Two Solitudes".

In the wake of the conscription crisis, Maurice Duplessis of the Union Nationale again rose to power. His government emphasized clerico-nationalist values and implemented conservative policies (the Grande Noirceur). These included defending provincial autonomy, promoting Quebec's Catholic and francophone heritage, and favouring laissez-faire capitalism over the emerging welfare state. However, with changes such as the appearance of television, baby boom, workers' conflicts, electrification of the countryside, emergence of a middle class, rural exodus and urbanization, expansion of universities and bureaucracies, creation of motorways, and renaissance of literature and poetry, French Canadian society began to develop new ideologies and aspirations.

== Modern Quebec (1960–present) ==
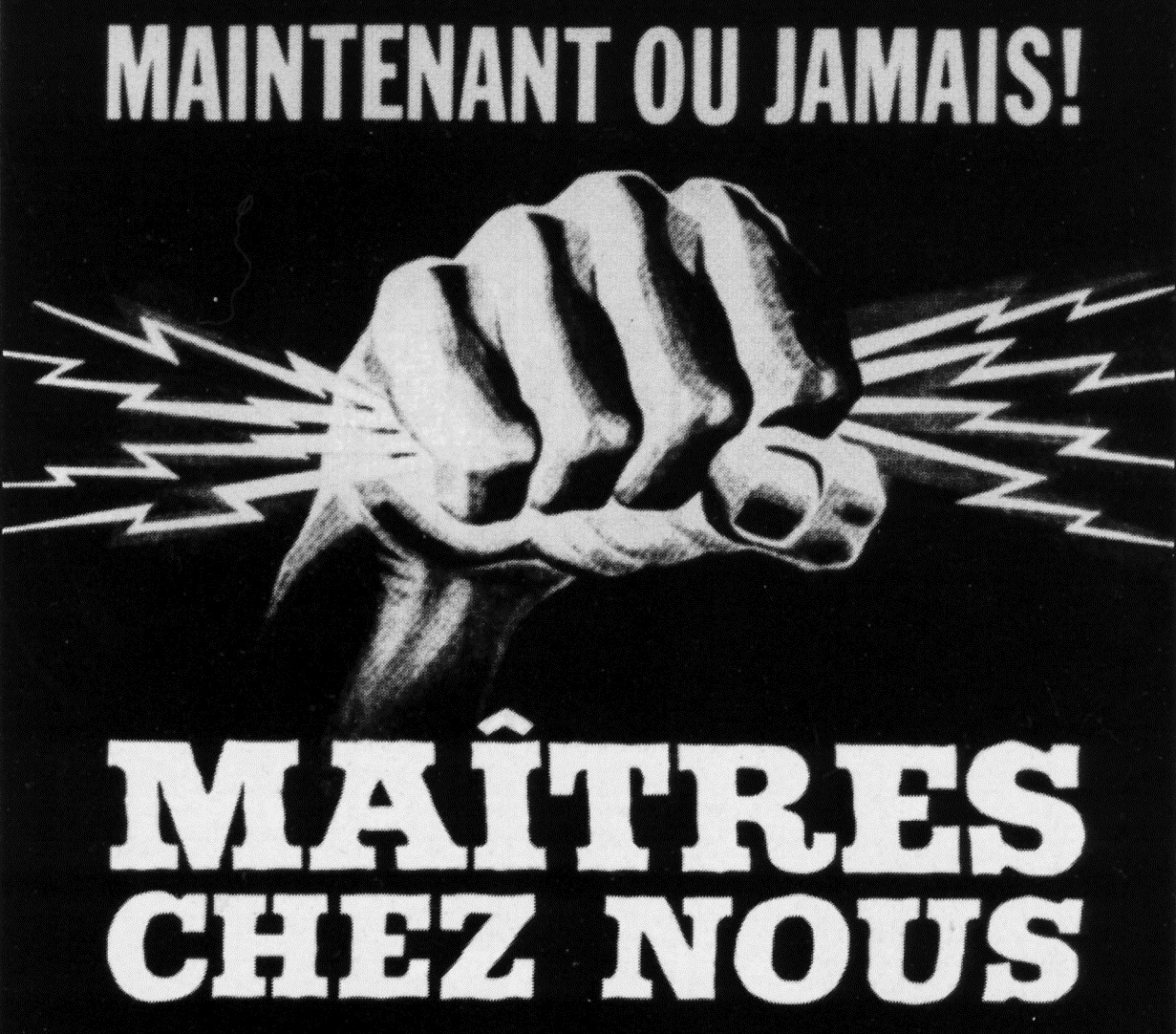
"Maîtres chez nous" was the electoral slogan of the Liberal Party during the 1962 election.

The Quiet Revolution was an intense period of modernization, secularization and social reform, where French Canadians expressed their dissatisfaction with their inferior socioeconomic position, and the cultural assimilation of francophone minorities in English-majority provinces. It resulted in the formation of the modern Québécois identity and Quebec nationalism. In 1960, Jean Lesage's Liberal Party was brought to power with a two-seat majority, having campaigned with the slogan "It's time for things to change".

This government fundamentally restructured Quebec's institutions, creating a modern welfare state through new ministries for education, social affairs, and economic development. It created the CDPQ, Ministry of Education, OQLF, Régie des rentes and Société générale de financement, and modernized the Labour Code and Ministry of Social Affairs. In 1962, the government dismantled the financial syndicates of Montreal's Saint Jacques Street to weaken the grip of the English-Canadian traditional economic elites. Also in 1962, Natural Resources Minister René Lévesque led the nationalization of Quebec's private electricity companies to create a unified Hydro-Québec. This massive project was estimated at over $600 million for the acquisition of eleven companies.

The Quiet Revolution was particularly characterized by the 1962 Liberal Party's slogan "Masters in our own house", which, announced a collective will for freedom of the French-Canadian people to the Anglo-American conglomerates that dominated the economy and natural resources. As a result of confrontations between the lower clergy and the laity, state institutions began to deliver services without the church, and many parts of civil society became more secular. In 1965, the Royal Commission on Bilingualism and Biculturalism wrote a preliminary report underlining Quebec's distinct character, and promoted open federalism, a political attitude guaranteeing Quebec a minimum amount of autonomy. To favour Quebec during its Quiet Revolution, Prime Minister Lester B. Pearson adopted a policy of open federalism. In 1966, the Union Nationale was re-elected and continued major reforms.

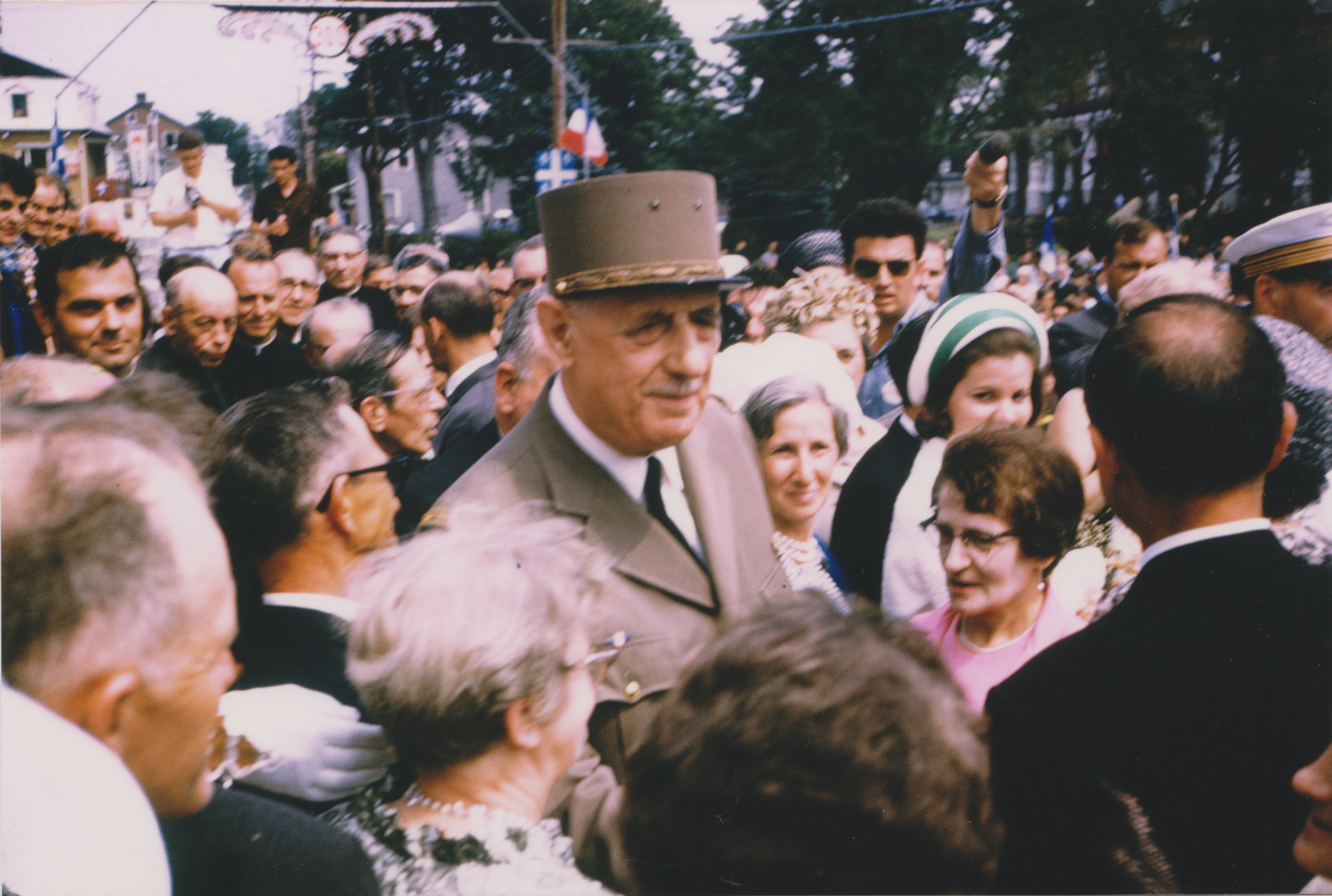
Charles De Gaulle, (1890–1970), on the occasion of Expo 1967, Chemin du Roy, Sainte-Anne-de-la-Pérade

In 1967, René Lévesque introduced the concept of sovereignty-association in his manifesto Option Quebec, proposing political independence with economic partnership including a common currency, free trade, and joint institutions. It sparked a constitutional debate on the province's political future that set federalist and sovereignist doctrines against each other. The meetings of the Estates General of French Canada in 1967 marked a tipping point where relations between Quebec and other francophones of Canada ruptured. This deeply affected both parties by breaking the pan-Canadian French-Canadian identity that had existed before then into: Quebec nationalism, and minority francophone groups elsewhere. Also in 1967, President of France Charles de Gaulle visited Quebec to attend Expo 67. There, he addressed a crowd of more than 100,000, ending with the exclamation: "Long live free Quebec". This declaration had a profound effect by bolstering the burgeoning modern Quebec sovereignty movement and sparking a diplomatic crisis between France and Canada. Following this, various civilian groups developed, sometimes confronting public authority, for example in the October Crisis of 1970.

In 1968, class conflicts and changes in mindset intensified. Quebec artists started celebrating their distinct identity: Michel Tremblay's 1968 play Les Belles-sœurs legitimized joual (working-class Quebec French) as a literary language, singer-songwriters like Félix Leclerc and Gilles Vigneault started a new style of Quebec popular music, and many local films debuted. In 1969, the federal Official Languages Act was passed to introduce a linguistic context conducive to Quebec's development. In 1973, the liberal government of Robert Bourassa initiated the James Bay Project on La Grande River. In 1974, it enacted the Official Language Act, which made French the official language of Quebec. In 1975, it established the Charter of Human Rights and Freedoms and the James Bay and Northern Quebec Agreement.

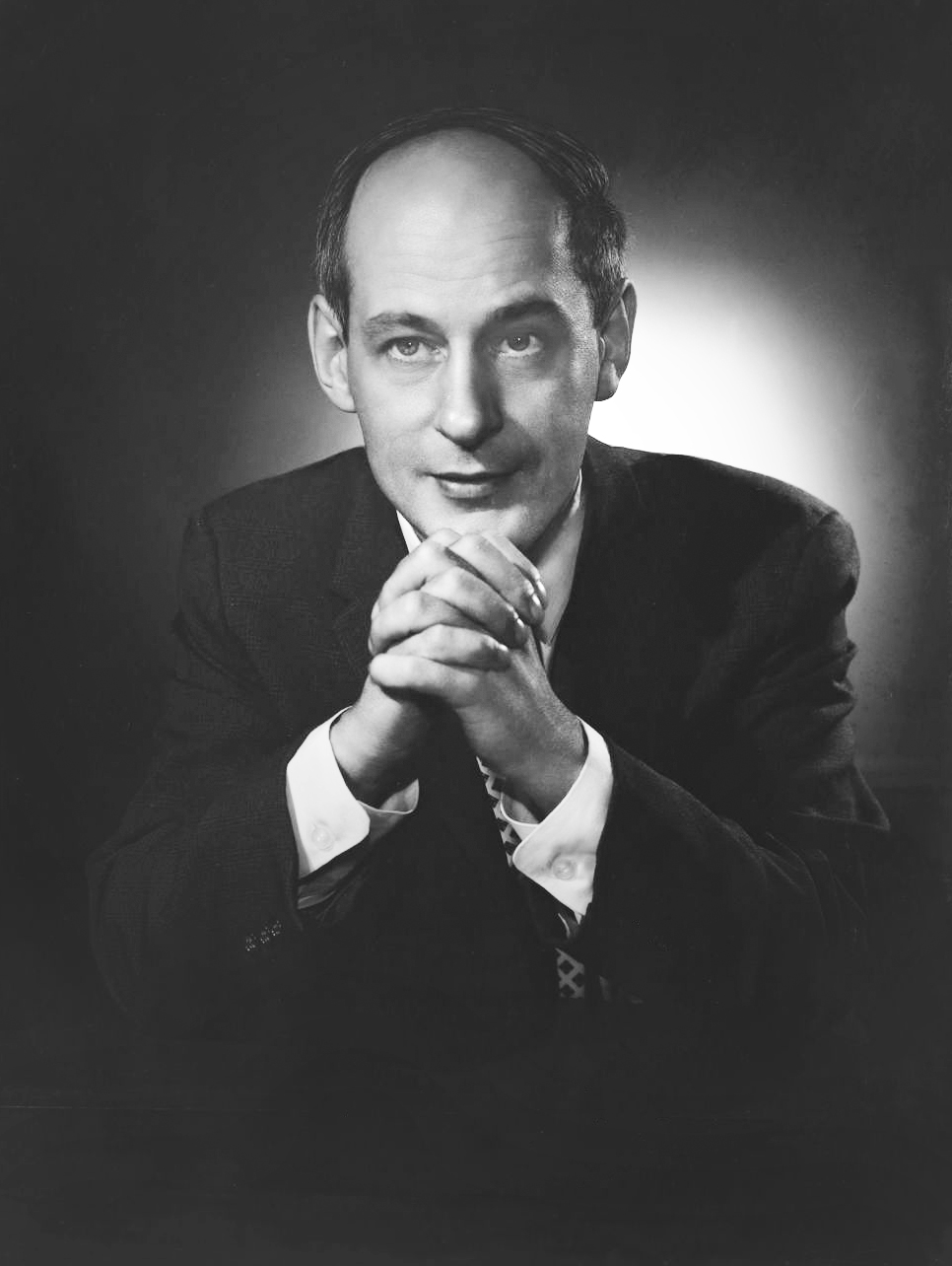
René Lévesque (1922–1987), one of the architects of the Quiet Revolution, and the Premier of Quebec's first modern sovereignist government

Quebec's first modern sovereignist government, led by René Lévesque, materialized when Parti Québécois came to power in 1976. The Charter of the French Language came into force the following year, which increased the use of French. Between 1966 and 1969, the Estates General of French Canada confirmed the state of Quebec to be the nation's fundamental political milieu and for it to have the right to self-determination.

In the 1980 referendum on sovereignty-association, 40% were for and 60% were against. After the referendum, Lévesque went back to Ottawa to continue negotiating constitutional changes. On November 4, 1981, the Kitchen Accord took place. Delegations from the other nine provinces and the federal government reached an agreement in the absence of Quebec's delegation, which had left for the night. Because of this, the National Assembly refused to recognize the new Constitution Act, 1982, which patriated the Canadian constitution and made modifications to it. The 1982 amendments apply to Quebec, despite Quebec never having consented to it.

Between 1982 and 1992, the Quebec government's attitude changed to prioritize reforming the federation. Attempts at constitutional amendments by the Mulroney and Bourassa governments ended in failure with the Meech Lake Accord of 1987 and the Charlottetown Accord of 1992, resulting in the creation of the Bloc Québécois. The failures also led to the re-election of the Parti Québécois in 1994, and the return to power of Jacques Parizeau, who had promised to hold a sovereignty referendum within a year of election. In 1995, Parizeau called a referendum on Quebec's independence from Canada. This consultation ended in a close outcome: 50.6% "no" and 49.4% "yes" (notably, over 60% of francophones voted "yes" and over 90% of anglophones voted "no").

In 1996, the federal government launched the Sponsorship Program to increase federal visibility in Quebec. In 2000, following the Supreme Court of Canada's decision on the Reference Re Secession of Quebec, the Parliament of Canada passed a legal framework, called the Clarity Act, within which governments would act in another referendum. In 2002, the Gomery commission and media revealed the Sponsorship Program, in which $539,000 was illegally spent and where well-connected agencies received millions for minimal work. This scandal contributed to the Liberals' defeat in the 2006 federal election. On October 30, 2003, the National Assembly voted unanimously to affirm "that the people of Québec form a nation". On November 27, 2006, the House of Commons followed with a symbolic motion declaring "that this House recognize that the Québécois form a nation within a united Canada."

In 2007, the Parti Québécois was pushed back to official opposition in the National Assembly, with the Liberal party leading. During the 2011 elections, Quebec voters rejected the Bloc Québécois in favour of the previously minor New Democratic Party (NDP). In 2012, the Liberal party, led by Jean Charest, announced an increase in student tuition fees. This spawned months-long protests involving over 300,000 students known as the Maple Spring, ultimately leading to a rollback of the increases. Also partially as a result, the Liberal party fell out of favour, letting the Parti Québécois regain power in 2012 and its leader, Pauline Marois, to become the first female premier of Quebec. The Liberal Party of Quebec then returned to power in 2014. Then, in 2018, the Coalition Avenir Québec (CAQ) won the provincial general elections.

Between 2020 and 2021, Quebec took measures against the COVID-19 pandemic. In 2022, the CAQ, led by Quebec's premier François Legault, increased its parliamentary majority in the provincial general elections. In 2025, following the implementation of tariffs and aggressive rhetoric by the US, Quebecers decreased their travel to the US, banned the sale of American alcohol, and slightly reduced personal purchases of US items. In 2026, Legault resigned as premier and CAQ leader and was succeeded by Christine Fréchette, who then led the party to an electoral wipeout in the 2026 Quebec general election, where the PQ under Paul St-Pierre Plamondon formed a minority government.

== Territorial evolution ==
Territorial evolution of Quebec

Canada in the 18th century

The Province of Quebec from 1763 to 1783

Lower Canada from 1791 to 1841 (Patriots' War in 1837, Canada East in 1841)

Quebec from 1867 to 1927

Quebec today. Quebec (in blue) has a border dispute with Labrador (in red).

== See also ==
- Timeline of Quebec history
- History of Montreal
- List of National Historic Sites of Canada in Quebec
