= Newfoundland and Labrador–Quebec border =

Border between two Canadian provinces

Map showing Quebec in blue, Newfoundland and Labrador in red, and the disputed area slashed red and blue.

The border between the provinces of Quebec and of Newfoundland and Labrador is the longest interprovincial border in Canada. It stretches for more than 3,500 kilometres (2,200 mi) on land, and, according to both provincial governments, also contains a maritime part. (Note: The federal government claims that the maritime border does not exist; see relevant section.) Starting from the north, the border follows the Laurentian Divide (the divide between the drainage basin of the Atlantic Ocean and of the Arctic Ocean) on the Labrador Peninsula for the majority of the border's length, then follows the divide between the Côte-Nord-Gaspé and Newfoundland-Labrador drainage basins as far as Brûlé Lake, after which it goes along the Romaine River downstream to the 52nd parallel, which it follows east to its southeastern terminus at Blanc-Sablon.

The division between Labrador and Quebec has changed over time. Labrador's coast has been recognized as part of Newfoundland since 1763 (except from 1774 to 1809), but the legal meaning of the word "coast" came to be disputed. A border dispute erupted in 1902 over the right to use natural resources in the Churchill River basin between the then dominions of Canada and Newfoundland. After lengthy delays, the case came before the Judicial Committee of the Privy Council in London, which in March 1927 delivered a win for Newfoundland and granted it the disputed land. The decision was further recognized by the governments of Canada and of Newfoundland when the latter joined Confederation in 1949 as the tenth province of Canada. The Privy Council described the line in general terms but it was never demarcated on the ground.

The government of Quebec disputes part of the boundary. Officials from this province argue and publish maps to the effect that the area of Labrador between the drainage basin divide and the 52nd parallel belongs to Quebec. At various times, the province's politicians alleged that the arbitration procedure was flawed and that the judges could have been biased, thus Newfoundland was awarded more territories than it specifically requested (ultra petita). Legal scholars, however, are unconvinced by the accusations of bias and have suggested that only political negotiations might resolve the ultra petita issue. The uncertain, winding border also made resource exploitation difficult, and separated mining and First Nations communities on either side of the border.

The maritime border's existence (and its delineation) is contested between the federal government and the provinces. According to Quebec, the Gulf of St. Lawrence is split equally between Quebec and Newfoundland; the latter says that there is some aquatic border but also argues that the 1964 agreement, which Quebec relies on and which was found to be non-binding in an arbitration case in 2001, was not ratified. Canada, in contrast, says that the waters belong to the federal government and therefore the boundary does not exist. In this respect, the jurisprudence of the Supreme Court of Canada supports the position of the federal government. This necessitates negotiation over the extent of exploitation of the natural resources and sharing of profits, in particular in relation to the Old Harry oil field.

== Before 1927 ==
The dependency of Labrador was created in 1763 and given to the colony of Newfoundland by a royal proclamation so that it could administer fishing rights. At that time, Labrador was limited to the coastal strip. Eleven years later, the Quebec Act 1774 gave the Province of Quebec control over all territories, islands and lands that had been appropriated to Newfoundland in 1763, but Newfoundland continued to regulate fishing. This created tensions between the colonies as Newfoundland no longer had any authority over the area. This state was short-lived because in 1809, Newfoundland got back the territories it lost in 1774 after lobbying in London. The southern border of Labrador was then defined by the British North America (Seigniorial Rights) Act 1825 (6 Geo. 4. c. 59). The act moved Lower Canada's border east from the Saint-Jean River to Blanc-Sablon. Lower Canada also gained territories from the coast up to the 52nd parallel north.

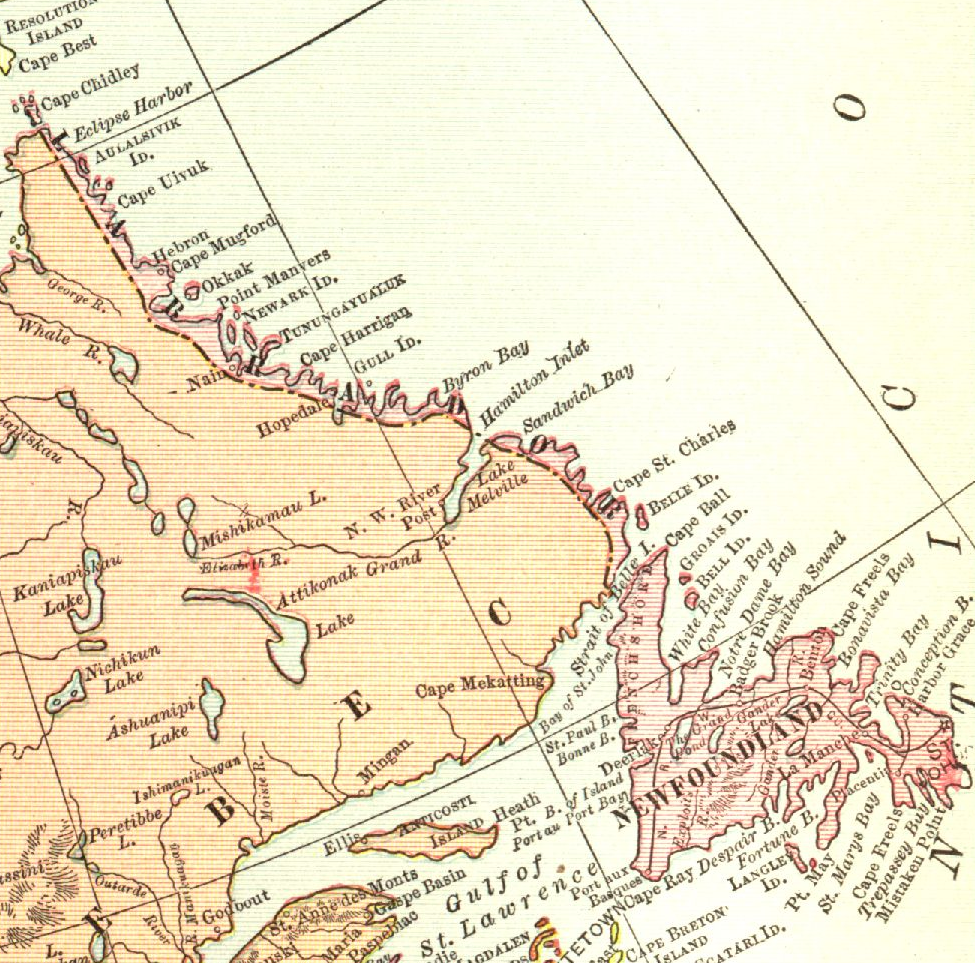
Map of Newfoundland with the narrow strip of Labrador coast, 1912

At Confederation, the Province of Canada was split in two. The eastern part, or Lower Canada, was renamed Quebec and became one of the four original provinces of the Dominion of Canada. Quebec's northern border was at the Laurentian Divide. That meant that it still shared the border with Labrador, a dependency of Newfoundland; however, the border was not clearly nor officially delimited.

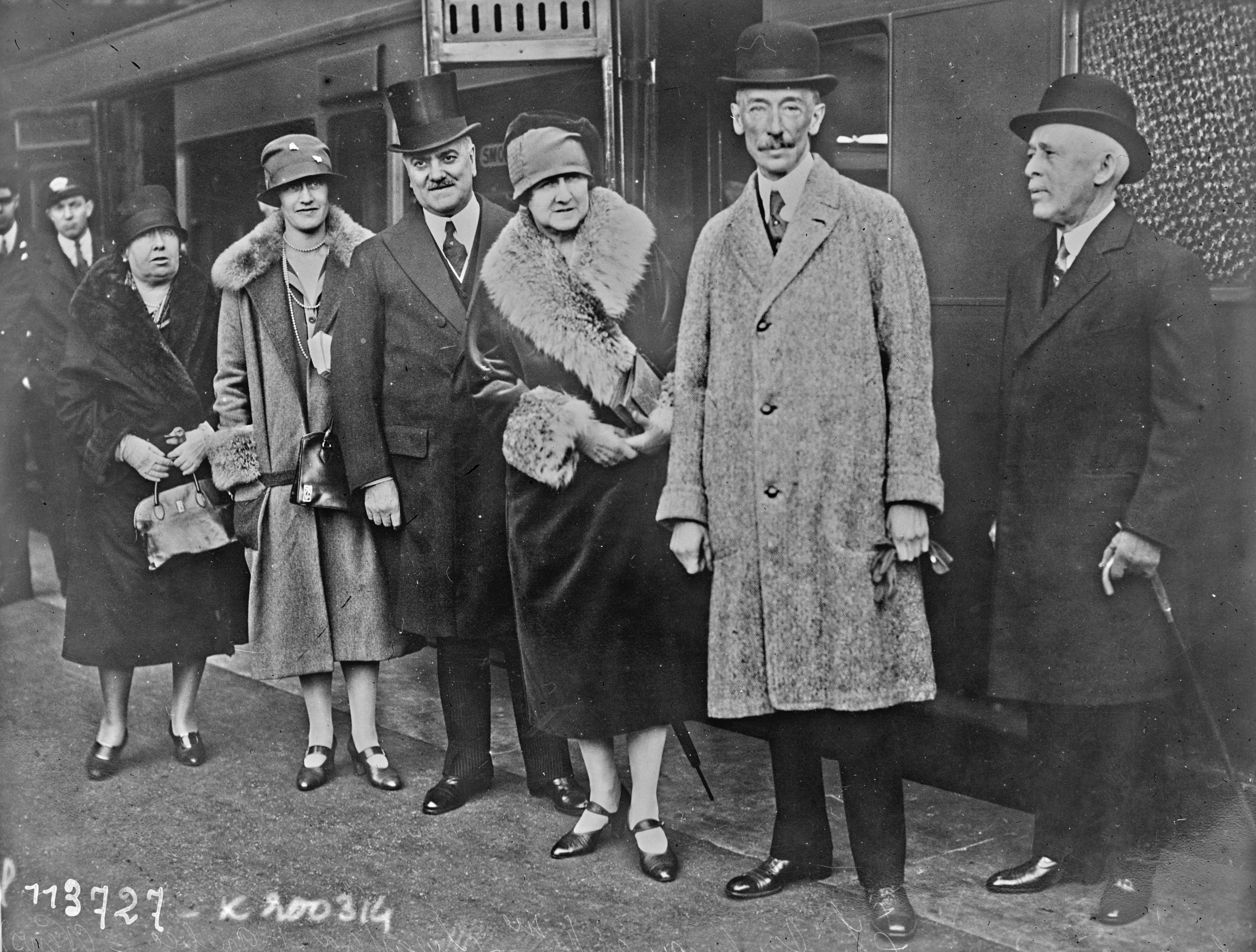
Louis-Alexandre Taschereau, then Premier of Quebec, in London lobbying for Quebec in the Labrador dispute, October 1926

Two expansions happened following Confederation. In 1898, Quebec and Canada adopted the Quebec Boundary Extension Act, 1898, which extended the northern frontier to the Eastmain River. This meant annexing a part of Labrador known as Ashuanipi (most of the southwestern part of the region); however, the area was not defined precisely, so the border remained officially undefined. Nine years later, Quebec requested an expansion of its territory further north to include the district of Ungava, which was granted by the Quebec Boundaries Extension Act, 1912. However, the act defined the border in the eastern part of Labrador as neighbouring the area "over which the island of Newfoundland has lawful jurisdiction", so it was not helpful to understand the precise course of the border. This border was also ambiguous as some islands were connected to the mainland at low tide, and thus the precise extent of the "Labrador shore" was unknown.

In 1924–25, the Dominion of Newfoundland proposed to sell interests in the eastern part of the peninsula to Quebec for CA$15–30 million ($271–541 million in 2025 dollars), but Quebec Premier Louis-Alexandre Taschereau refused. He believed that the territory lawfully belonged to Canada (and thus Quebec), and decided to wait for the Privy Council's decision. The government in St. John's then repeated its offer after a favourable Privy Council decision, this time to Canada, asking $110 million (equivalent to $2.2 billion in 2025 dollars) for the land, but that deal was also rejected. When Newfoundland surrendered its autonomy to British authorities in 1934 due to the government's severe budgetary crisis, it was ready to sell Labrador again, but Quebec was not receptive. Just before joining Confederation, Newfoundland launched one more bid to sell Labrador, which a lot of Newfoundlanders found to be useless beyond the fishing rights the waters conferred, but it also failed.

== Judicial determination of the boundary ==
Labrador Boundary Dispute
- Court: Judicial Committee of the Privy Council
- Full case name: In the Matter of the Boundary Between the Dominion of Canada and the Colony of Newfoundland in the Labrador Peninsula
- Decided: 1 March 1927
- Citation: [1927] UKPC 25, [1927] A.C. 695
- Transcripts: (decision only); (all documents)

Case history
- Appealed from: Supreme Court of Canada, Supreme Court of Newfoundland

Court membership
- Judges sitting: Viscount Haldane, Lord Finlay, Lord Sumner, Lord Warrington of Clyffe

Case opinions
- Decision by: Viscount Haldane

Keywords
- Labrador boundary

In 1888, a trial judge in Labrador presided over a murder trial in which the defendant moved to dismiss the proceedings due to lack of jurisdiction. As a result, he advised his superiors in St. John's that the border of Labrador was not clearly defined and urged them to settle it, but the issue was not considered a high-priority one and was left for later resolution.

In 1902, a conflict erupted between Quebec, which was part of the Dominion of Canada, and Newfoundland, a colony of the United Kingdom, when Newfoundland issued a timber licence for a Nova Scotian company on the Churchill River. Quebec said the Quebec Boundary Extension Act, 1898 had granted them possession over most of Labrador and therefore the licence had to be issued by Quebec's authorities and had to conform to its laws. The company, on the other hand, contended that Newfoundland claimed all territories north of the 52nd parallel north and east of the 64th meridian west, so it did not violate anything. As the parties were unable to agree, Simon-Napoléon Parent, Quebec's minister of lands, mines and fisheries, asked the Canadian government to refer the question to the Judicial Committee of the Privy Council for arbitration. (Note: At that time, the Privy Council was the court of last resort having jurisdiction over disputes between two possessions of the United Kingdom. Even if Newfoundland had been part of Canada at the time, the Canadian Supreme Court Act in its pre-1949 version allowed non-criminal appeals to the Privy Council.) The governments of Canada and Newfoundland had agreed to do so by 1907, but it took them 15 years to agree to a common protocol. According to that set of rules, the Privy Council went on to determine "the location and definition of the boundary as between Canada and Newfoundland in the Labrador Peninsula under the statutes, orders-in-council and proclamations". The court was not tasked with drawing a new boundary, but only with issuing an interpretation of existing documents regulating Quebec's and Labrador's border to determine the possession of the Churchill River basin.

The stakes were high because of the large area of contested land (180,000 km^{2} (69,000 mi^{2})), but more importantly, forest resources estimated at $250 million ($4,511 million in 2025 dollars) could be lost, or retained, depending on the perspective. Additionally, the Churchill Falls, then a full-blown waterfall higher than the Niagara, was in the area, which would prove to be an important asset in hydroelectricity.

=== Privy Council decision ===
Oral arguments were held from late October to mid-November of 1926. According to L'actualité's analysis of documents of the Commission Studying the Territorial Integrity of Quebec, a government inquiry tasked with determining the soundness of Quebec's claims, Canada, which also represented Quebec, defended its claims very poorly. It first started arguing that the border did not exist at all even though its existence was an assumption upon which the arbitration had been launched. Canada then tried to demonstrate that proclamations only granted the Dominion of Newfoundland a strip of land extending 1.0 mi (1.6 km) from the coast so that it could control the coastal fisheries, while the inland parts of Labrador were part of Indian territory. That was despite the distance from Blanc-Sablon to the 52nd parallel (part of the frontier mentioned in the British North America (Seigniorial Rights) Act 1825) being 39 mi (63 km). Canada also presented no evidence to the court of its numerous geological expeditions it had done to estimate the riches of the area and of the settlements of its citizens in Labrador's hinterland. This gave Newfoundland an edge in its arguments.

Newfoundland contended that the term "coast", which was used in communications with different governors, was meant to be more than just a narrow coastal strip, and that precedent showed that "coast" also referred to the drainage basin. The island's lawyers also showed documents confirming the government's presence in the area, including an agreement with the Hudson's Bay Company in which the company was obliged to pay royalties to Newfoundland for fur concessions located on the other side of the watershed (from HBC's point of view).

On 1 March 1927, the Judicial Committee issued a decision that sided with Newfoundland's interpretation of the border. It defined the frontier between Canada and Newfoundland as being:

[...] a line drawn due north from the eastern boundary of the bay or harbour of Ance Sablon as far as the fifty-second degree of north latitude, and from thence westward along that parallel until it reaches the Romaine river, and then northward along the left or east bank of that river and its head waters to their source and from thence due north to the crest of the watershed or height of land there, and from thence westward and northward along the crest of the watershed of the rivers flowing into the Atlantic Ocean until it reaches Cape Chidley [...]

The Privy Council ruled that the word "territory" (and not necessarily "coast"), as used in documents of the time, must have included a larger portion of the peninsula than Canada contended. At the same time, it made some corrections of the border that were not requested, as well as some errors. On the one hand, as Patrick McGrath noted, Canada's (and Quebec's) eastern border on the Gulf of St. Lawrence was moved 1.5 mi (2.4 km) eastward, effectively granting 60 mi^{2} (160 km^{2}) of land to Canada. On the other hand, Henri Dorion, a Quebec geographer, stated that Cape Chidley was on Killiniq Island, which has never been part of Quebec. At that time, it belonged to the Northwest Territories and now is part of Nunavut. Moreover, the Privy Council drew the line on the 52nd parallel north, rather than on the watershed. This made making the Council "recognize as Newfoundland's a territory bigger than it asked for, which in legal settings is called an ultra petita decision". The Council's border also divided the Innu and other First Nations, whose future it did not take into consideration.

As a result of such changes, the boundary between Quebec and Newfoundland and Labrador has become the longest interprovincial boundary in Canada, going for over 3,500 km (2,200 mi).

== Newfoundland enters Confederation ==
When Newfoundland entered Confederation in March 1949, the Newfoundland Act (then known as British North America Act 1949) specified that

The Province of Newfoundland shall comprise the same territory as at the date of Union, that is to say, the island of Newfoundland and the islands adjacent thereto, the Coast of Labrador as delimited in the report delivered by the Judicial Committee of His Majesty's Privy Council on the first day of March, 1927, and approved by His Majesty in His Privy Council on the twenty-second day of March, 1927, and the islands adjacent to the said Coast of Labrador.

— Section 2, British North America Act 1949

Therefore, the law stipulated that the borders as determined in the 1927 Privy Council decision were recognized by Canada and Newfoundland and from that time became internal rather than international borders.

== Land border dispute ==
=== Problems with demarcation ===
The red line outlines the part of Labrador claimed by both Quebec and Newfoundland and Labrador. See Duplessis.

According to the 1927 Privy Council decision in London, the land border's shape was in part defined by the Laurentian Divide. According to Henri Dorion and Jean-Paul Lacasse, cartographers and geographers have stated that it was impossible to define the exact border based on the Privy Council's ruling, as there are polyrheic areas (belonging to both river basins at the same time) and arheic areas (belonging to neither). Other issues also exist; therefore, they argue that the possession of these areas should be negotiated during demarcation.

Moreover, the area between the 52nd parallel north and the watershed is subject to an active dispute, as Quebec contends that the region was granted despite Newfoundland not requesting it (ultra petita). Legal scholars say this argument may have merit, but only a political resolution to the problem is possible. In 2018, there were no voters in the contested area registered on the Quebec electoral list.

=== Position of Canada and the province of Newfoundland and Labrador ===
The government of Newfoundland and Labrador believes that the Privy Council decision has legal force. Joey Smallwood, the premier of Newfoundland at the time it joined Confederation, stated that Quebec had nothing to do with the definition of the border as it was not a separate dominion of the British Empire. The province further argues that since Quebec did not officially oppose Newfoundland's entering Confederation in 1949 (sealed by the Newfoundland Act), it tacitly recognized the border. It also cites the Constitution Act, 1982, which contains the Newfoundland Act, to confirm it. In 2007, John Ottenheimer, N.L. minister for intergovernmental affairs, said in relation to the Labrador border:

Our province has written Quebec in the past on this issue but we take comfort in the fact that the Constitution is on our side and the law is on the side of this province, and we know where the border exists.

In cartographical representations of the country, the federal government also uses the border with a straight line at the 52nd parallel north.

=== Position of Quebec ===
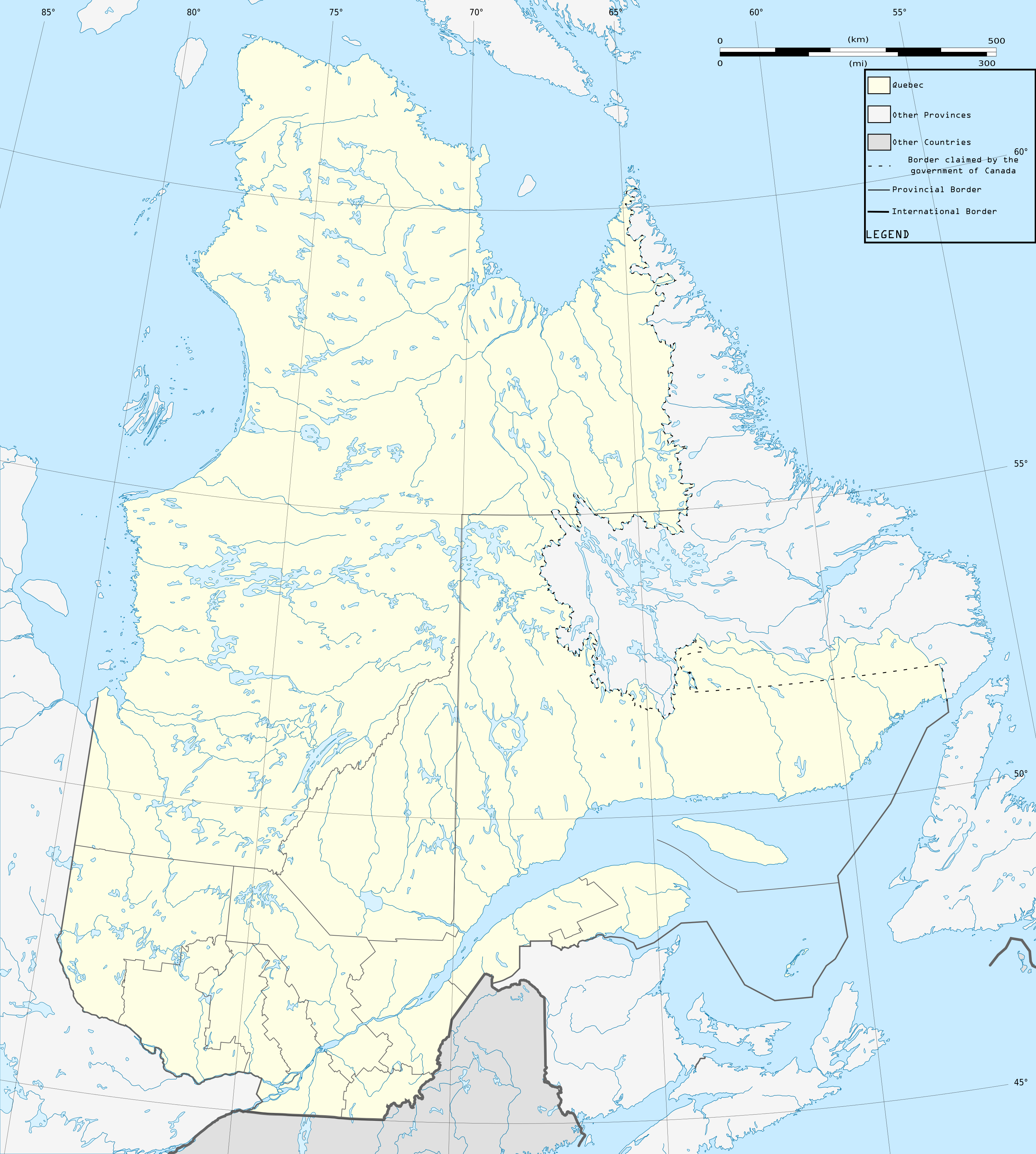
Map of Quebec, drawn according to the standards set by the provincial government. Two boundaries may be seen to the south of Labrador – one on the 52nd parallel (recognized by Canada and the province of Newfoundland and Labrador) and the other on the St. Lawrence-Atlantic watershed (claimed by Quebec).

Quebec has never officially recognised the decision of the Privy Council. Several theories and accusations have been put forward to explain the unfavourable ruling: the judges' alleged conflict of interest (either by favouring the colony of Newfoundland to the more autonomous Dominion of Canada, or by having financial stakes in mining companies), the lack of representation of Quebec, or the will to award more than was asked for, which resonate in Quebec's society. Following the news of the unfavourable judicial ruling, Taschereau was displeased with it, but successive governments largely tended to avoid the issue. The premier of Quebec, however, assured that the loss was not total as it was impossible to develop the rivers without Quebec's involvement, and indeed Newfoundland later had problems bypassing Quebec to get the resources to the customers, as any route not going through the province was economically unfeasible.

As successive provincial governments started to contest or outright reject the Privy Council's ruling, this has become a sensitive issue. Maurice Duplessis, during Newfoundland's negotiations to enter Confederation, demanded that Labrador be handed over to Quebec, for which he was called by Newfoundland's officials a "Hitler marching on the Sudetenland". He also attracted other accusations of being dishonest and only doing that to get more votes prior to the 1948 election. It is unclear whether that was an official complaint or simply political discourse by a top government official. According to the St. John's-based Evening Telegram, this was not an official protest.

Many more protests started to appear as the potential to use Labrador's vast natural resources were uncovered, and various politicians started to recognize that paying royalties to Newfoundland for extracting resources would be a tacit concession that the island province exercises jurisdiction over Labrador. The majority of the Quebecker general electorate believed at the time that the Churchill Falls Generating Station was on Quebec soil and it therefore was incomprehensible why Hydro-Québec would have to buy electricity from a non-Quebec corporation if it was operating in Quebec. In 1966, just before signing the letter of intent to build the Churchill Falls hydroelectric plant, Premier Daniel Johnson Sr. claimed that Quebec still retained its sovereignty over Labrador, including its waters, on the grounds that during the 1926 hearing, Quebec was not duly represented and thus the procedure was flawed; he dismissed the border on the 52nd parallel as being "only recognized by the federal government". The 1963 book, published by Dorion and on which the claim was based, slammed the decision as being "riddled with major flaws" and "basing on absolutely imprecise data" and derided it as "nothing but a gross anomaly". The controversy over the tacit recognition of the border was ultimately avoided as Newfoundland was in a weaker negotiating position, and Hydro-Québec and its owner, the provincial government, introduced several clauses favourable to Quebec. The final contract thus said that Quebec courts, or the Supreme Court of Canada, had jurisdiction over disputes concerning Churchill Falls, while also crossing out all legal references to Newfoundland's jurisdiction, and thus the Labrador border, from the final draft.

The rhetoric was ramped up in subsequent years. René Lévesque, who founded the sovereigntist Parti Québécois in the 1970s, criticized the border as "idiotic" and later referred to the ruling as a "judicial theft" and "judicial occupation". In 2001, when Newfoundland sought to amend the Newfoundland Act by changing its official name to Newfoundland and Labrador, two Quebec ministers issued a statement, which said:

First of all, the ministers remind that no Quebec government has formally recognized the boundary between Quebec and Newfoundland on the Labrador Peninsula as defined by the opinion issued by the Judicial Committee of the Privy Council in London in 1927. For Quebec, the border has therefore never been legally binding. (...) The ministers [would like to] stress that the government of Newfoundland and the federal government have recently confirmed to the government of Quebec that said modification [of adding "and Labrador" to Newfoundland's name] was only a symbolic name change and for that reason would not entail any territorial or border changes. (...) As far as the question of the boundary between Quebec and Newfoundland on the Labrador Peninsula goes, the ministers remind that the position of the government of Quebec stays the same as the one of previous governments.

— Jacques Brassard, minister of natural resources of Quebec and Joseph Facal, minister of Canadian intergovernmental relations of Quebec

With Quebec contesting the border, it also sought to assert its official position on maps. Quebec uses a special set of instructions, used by all provincial government bodies, including Elections Quebec and Hydro-Québec, to designate the borders. While these maps no longer assert sovereignty over the whole of Labrador peninsula, they contest the land in the southern part of the region. The provincial guidelines for Quebec maps say that:

- the territory of Labrador must appear but should not be expressly identified;
- the border symbol used for the border between Labrador and Quebec must be different from other interprovincial or international boundaries (in the legend, they propose to name it "Quebec–Newfoundland and Labrador border (this border is not binding)", French: Frontière Québec–Terre-Neuve-et-Labrador (cette frontière n’est pas définitive));
- on the length of the border with Labrador, two markers saying "1927 delineation of the Privy Council (non-binding)" (French: Tracé de 1927 du Conseil privé (non définitif)) must be put, one on the 52nd parallel and the other north of Schefferville, whenever possible; additionally, Labrador must be coloured in a way that does not offer too much contrast with Quebec;
- Quebec's territory should be coloured to the watershed, rather than to the 52nd parallel north. However, both Quebec's claimed border and the Privy Council delineation should appear.

==== Reaction from legal scholars ====
Legal scholars have generally considered Quebec's claims and accusations to be dubious at best and frivolous at worst. While they said that ultra petita claims might have some merits and could therefore serve as a possible justification for partial adjustment of the border (though not through the court system), they state that the Privy Council decision is binding and has full legal force, dismissing allegations of conflict of interest or lack of representation of Quebec as unproven or not valid reasons to review it. Henri Dorion initially conceded, despite his opposition to the border as described in his 1963 book, that legal remedies are unavailable and that the border as drawn in 1927 was becoming more and more entrenched, which politicians also recognized at the time. Later in his life, he seemed to have changed his position towards deeming Quebec's claims baseless as he believed that the passage of time and politicians' actions further undermined Quebec's cause. He stressed that the government of Quebec had implicitly recognized the Privy Council delineation in several separate instances, for example in the case of Iron Ore Company of Canada, which tried to make estimates of the amount of provincial taxes due to exploitation of the natural resources and whose estimates Quebec accepted. He later also pointed to the fact that Charles Lanctôt and Aimé Geoffrion, the litigants on behalf of Canada, were both from Quebec, so the contention that Quebec was not represented was, in his opinion, unfounded.

== Maritime border dispute ==
=== Background ===
Old Harry oil field, on the boundary between Quebec and Newfoundland and Labrador

The maritime border between Quebec and Newfoundland and Labrador, unlike the land border, has never been defined by statute or a regulation between the provinces and the federal government. In 1964 and 1972, the Atlantic provinces and Quebec signed an agreement in which they limited their licensing jurisdiction for fossil fuel searching and drilling on the line equidistant from the shores of the provinces. This division depends on the assumption that the waters are in fact the internal waters of Canada outside federal jurisdiction. In the case when the waters of the Gulf of St. Lawrence are international, there are no provincial borders as such; and even if these are recognized as internal waters, no provincial boundaries are in place again if these are recognized to be under exclusive federal jurisdiction.

Most of the governments (with the notable exception of the United States) generally recognize the territory of the Gulf of St. Lawrence not to be international waters. For the United States, the waters, just like the Northwest Passage, are of strategic importance, and are therefore not under Canadian sovereignty; the French also protest its assertion. As for intra-Canadian borders, the arbitration ruling in 2001 between Nova Scotia and Newfoundland found that the 1964 agreement delimiting the borders of the provinces was not binding; that said, Canada and the provinces generally respect the boundaries set in that deal.

=== Federal government's position ===
The federal government asserts that the Gulf of St. Lawrence's waters are internal federal waters, meaning that the territory is not subject to international maritime regulations and that only the federal government has jurisdiction over the area. However, Canada's position on the subject is not firm as an explicit statement on the subject could "on the one hand, attract a rebuke of principle from the United States, and, on the other, revive claims – regardless of their legal soundness – of the maritime provinces over the rights to exploit seabed resources". That said, according to the federal government, which has pronounced more and more acts asserting sovereignty over the waters, the territories of Quebec and Newfoundland and Labrador end at the seashore.

The federal government's position was confirmed by the Supreme Court of Canada in 1967 in Reference Re: Offshore Mineral Rights, in which the Court held that British Columbia did not have jurisdiction over the territorial waters or the continental shelf, with the caveat, added in 1982, that for reasons unique to British Columbia (the Oregon Treaty), the province could nevertheless have jurisdiction over the Strait of Georgia. Newfoundland's continental shelf was also ruled to be in the federal jurisdiction in 1984. The rulings necessitated the negotiation of resources between the federal and the provincial government. The federal government has a general agreement on profit sharing from the oil and gas resources near the shore of Newfoundland and Labrador and manages the exploitation via a federal-provincial petroleum board. Quebec signed a similar agreement in 2011 but does not have a dedicated board.

=== Position of Newfoundland and Labrador ===
In a 2003 speech, Newfoundland's minister of mines and energy, Ed Byrne, announced that the province intended to reach an agreement with Quebec, trying to strike a deal similar to the one its government had set with Nova Scotia. In March 2010, Kathy Dunderdale, then Premier of Newfoundland and Labrador, stated that the border was yet to be defined and that the 1964 agreements had never been ratified. That said, she expressed joy upon news that Quebec and Canada agreed on the terms of exploitation of the resources in the Old Harry oil field in 2011, the exact shares of which were to be determined by arbitration. The oil field ultimately went unused: in July 2020, the Supreme Court of Newfoundland and Labrador sided with environmentalists and revoked the permission to exploit the Old Harry field on Newfoundland's side, while in December 2021, the government of François Legault banned oil drilling in the waters of Quebec.

=== Position of Quebec ===
Quebec recognizes the maritime border with other Atlantic provinces, including Newfoundland and Labrador, as being equidistant from the shores of the provinces. In fact, the provincial authorities, who initiated the 1964 and 1972 agreements on sea borders with New Brunswick, Nova Scotia, Prince Edward Island and Newfoundland and Labrador, consider them binding; this was confirmed by two separate commissions, in 1966 and 1991, and determined to be the model should Quebec declare independence. In 1969, minister of natural resources Paul Allard said of the agreements reached with other provinces:

Minister Allard speaking [...] on behalf of Quebec [...] stated that the Province of Quebec had already accepted the boundaries as they were outlined by the four Atlantic provinces before Quebec was part of the original group. Quebec accepted these boundaries in good faith and further in good faith undertook certain actions and made certain commitments concerning the area within these boundaries. Quebec has at all times considered these boundaries as part of Quebec and there is no good reason why it should decide otherwise now. Quebec accepted the boundaries at the request of the four Atlantic Provinces, which request was considered by Quebec to have been seriously made and no one has objected to its actions or activities within those boundaries.

== Impact ==
The border between Newfoundland and Labrador and Quebec, apart from being partially disputed, often disrupts services if these are straddled across the border and no agreements exist on them, or if the governments close the border. For instance, after a health services agreement expired between mining settlements of Fermont and Labrador City (25 km (16 mi) apart), childbirth operations for women living in Fermont could no longer take place in Labrador. They had to be made in Sept-Îles, a city 300 km (190 mi) away from Fermont; to reach it, prospective mothers had to be delivered by plane. As the COVID-19 pandemic struck Canada, the provincial borders were closed for two months, impairing travel between border communities.

The border dispute, as well as the Churchill Falls project by Hydro-Québec also contributed to animosity between residents and governments of the two provinces. This partly relates to the fact that Newfoundland residents often manifest their nationalism by attachment to Labrador and by showing that Newfoundland exercises its powers there, while Quebec nationalists strive to return the territory back to Quebec.

In the 1960s, Jean Lesage, then Premier of Quebec, proposed to tie better conditions of the Hydro-Québec deal with Newfoundland (which Newfoundland and Labrador now perceives as unfair) in exchange for resolution of the border conflict in Quebec's favour, an idea that Newfoundlanders did not like. Newfoundland and Labrador's and Quebec's officials often express anger or disappointment over what they see as wrong maps.

For example, in 2023, Jordan Brown, a Newfoundland and Labrador politician, criticized the Bloc Québécois for exhibiting a map of Quebec on which the whole of Labrador was depicted as part of Quebec.

== See also ==
- Geography of Quebec
- Geography of Newfoundland and Labrador
- Politics of Quebec
- Politics of Newfoundland and Labrador
- Politics of Canada
