= James Bay and Northern Quebec Agreement =

Aboriginal land claim settlement in Quebec

The James Bay and Northern Quebec Agreement (French: Convention de la Baie-James et du Nord québécois) is an Aboriginal land claim settlement, approved in 1975 by the Cree and Inuit of northern Quebec, and later slightly modified in 1978 by the Northeastern Quebec Agreement (French: Accord du Nord-Est québécois), through which Quebec's Naskapi First Nation joined the agreement. The agreement covers economic development and property issues in northern Quebec, as well as establishing a number of cultural, social and governmental institutions for Indigenous people who are members of the communities involved in the agreement.

== History ==
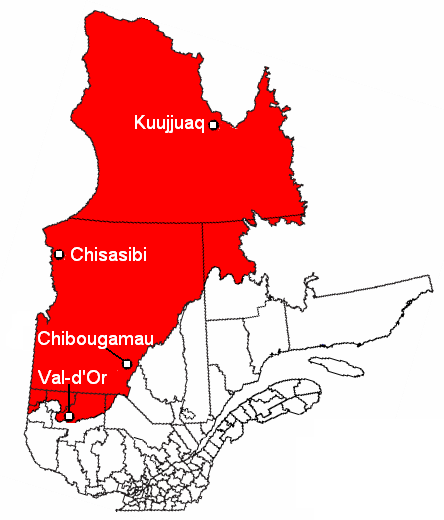
Northern Quebec (territory covered by the James Bay and Northern Quebec Agreement of 1975)

Before Canadian Confederation, the lands of northern Quebec had been a part of Rupert's Land – the territory administered by the Hudson's Bay Company as part of the charter it received from King Charles II in 1670. In 1870, Rupert's Land was ceded to Canada, and in 1895 the region between the then-province of Quebec and the Hudson Strait became the District of Ungava of the Northwest Territories. In 1898, the border of Quebec was extended north to the Eastmain River. Quebec continued to claim the remaining District of Ungava, north of the Eastmain River, and in 1912 the area was transferred to Quebec, subject to the condition that a treaty be negotiated with the Indigenous peoples of the region recognizing their cultural rights and surrendering their title to the land to Quebec and Canada. There was at the time no pre-existing treaty covering that area. The government of Quebec did not immediately undertake such negotiations.

In the 1960s, Quebec began developing potential hydroelectric resources in the north, and in 1971 created the James Bay Development Corporation to pursue the development of mining, forestry and other potential resources starting with the James Bay Hydroelectric Project. This massive undertaking, which was directed by an increasingly assertive government of Quebec without consulting Indigenous people, was opposed by most of northern Quebec's Cree and Inuit. The Quebec Association of Indians – an ad hoc representative body of Indigenous northern Quebecers – sued the government and, on 15 November 1973, won an injunction in the Quebec Superior Court blocking hydroelectric development until the province had negotiated an agreement with the Indigenous nations.

This judgment was overruled by the Quebec Court of Appeal seven days later, after the government's efforts to quickly negotiate an agreement failed. Nonetheless, the legal requirement that Quebec negotiate a treaty covering the territory had not been overturned, even though construction continued.

Over the course of the next year, the government of Quebec negotiated the required accord. On 15 November 1974 – exactly a year after the Superior Court decision – an agreement-in-principle was signed between the government of Canada, the Province of Quebec, the publicly owned Hydro-Québec corporation, the Grand Council of the Crees (chaired by Billy Diamond), and the Northern Quebec Inuit Association. The final accord – the James Bay And Northern Quebec Agreement (French: La Convention de la Baie James et du Nord québécois) – was signed on 11 November 1975. This convention originally only covered claims made by Quebec Cree and Inuit; however, on 31 January 1978, the Naskapi of Quebec signed a parallel agreement – the Northeastern Quebec Agreement – and joined the institutions established under the 1975 accord.

Negotiating the first land claim on behalf of the Inuit, the Northern Quebec Inuit Association (NQIA) included as members Zebedee Nungak, Lazarusie Epoo (Inukjuak), Tommy Cain, Johnny Watt, Charlie Watt (from Kuujjuaq) and Jacob Oweetaltuk. Charlie Watt acquired a James Bay development map and found two rivers were going to be impacted; the Great Whale and Caniapiscau were to be dammed and diverted.

Zebedee Nungak describes the Quebec government's approach to negotiations was "overt greed backed up by raw power". Another section Zebedee describes Quebec's attitude was; "In the status of our quo, we are the Bosses; we have legal authority over all land. You need our permission to attain any benefits from this land, over which we are "maitres chez nous".

The James Bay and Northern Quebec agreement has been further modified by some 20 additional accords affecting the implementation and details of the original agreement, as well as expanding their provisions. Furthermore, the Constitution Act, 1982, entrenched in the Constitution of Canada all the rights granted in treaties and land claims agreements enacted before 1982, giving the rights outlined in the original agreement the status of constitutional rights.

== Contents ==
The James Bay agreement touches on a number of subjects and, as the first Canada-Indigenous treaty since the 1920s, it bears little resemblance to previous treaties but has become the prototype of the many agreements made since then. It established a number of provisions, principally in the following areas:

- Lands

The traditional lands of the signatories are divided into three categories:

Category I: Lands reserved exclusively for the use of Inuit and Cree beneficiaries.
Category II: Lands owned by the Crown-in-right-of-Quebec, but in which hunting, fishing and trapping rights are reserved for Indigenous peoples and over which forestry, mining and tourism development authority is shared.
Category III: Lands in which some specific hunting and harvesting rights are reserved for Indigenous peoples, but all other rights are shared subject to a joint regulatory scheme.

Section 7 of the James Bay and Northern Quebec Agreement states that northern Quebec, above the 55th parallel, belongs to the Inuit. This land is split into three categories, Category I lands, roughly 14,000 square kilometers, Category II lands, 150,929 square kilometers, and Category III lands, 908,000, nearly 60% of Quebec.

Category I – The title to the Category I lands was transferred to the Inuit Community Corporations (now known as The Landholding Corporations) for Inuit community purposes. Each community was given about 243 square miles. Though category I lands are owned by the Inuit communities of Nunavik, the subsurface and the minerals rights are still owned by the Quebec government, though they cannot extract minerals in the subsurface without permission of the local village and without compensation. Category I lands cannot be sold or given up except to the Crown in the right of Quebec.

- Note* At no time may the total area of Category I land be greater than 3,130 square miles without the consent of Quebec, or be less than 3,130 square miles without the consent of Inuit.

Category II – Category II lands belong to the Government of Quebec, but the Inuit have exclusive hunting, fishing and trapping rights. Category II can be taken away by Quebec for the purpose of development but only with consent and compensation for the nearest village.

Category III – Category III lands are everything not in Category I or Category II lands. Category III lands are owned by Quebec, and the government of Quebec can authorize development projects without consulting the nearby communities and Landholding Corporations. Category III lands are a joint use area for Inuit and non-Inuit in matters of access, as well as for hunting, fishing and trapping activities.

- Environmental and Social Protections

Section 23: Environment and Social Protections North of the 55th Parallel is one out of 30 Sections of the JBNQA. In this section, they created the Kativik Environmental Quality Commission (KEQC) and the Kativik Environmental Advisory Committee (KEAC). These two committees are responsible for evaluating and examining developmental projects that are to take place on land that belongs to the provincial government and governed under the James Bay and Northern Québec Agreement (JBNQA). In order for any project to come through in Nunavik, they need to follow specific mandates such as; determine any possible negative effects on the land, the animals and the people. They are responsible for making sure the companies are keeping up with the needs of the people and the land by assessing and adapting the regulations and laws. The Companies who wish to develop on the land must evaluate and research the environment to foresee future development in the region and hand in their assessments to the two committees and they will determine if the proposal will be accepted. For informational purposes and appropriate actions, all decisions and recommendations are communicated to the federal and provincial government, including the areas affected.

- Economic development and financial compensation

In return for their signatures, the governments of Quebec and Canada and Hydro-Québec agreed to provide northern Quebec Indigenous peoples with extensive direct financial compensation – some CA$225 million to be managed and used for economic development through three Indigenous-owned development corporations: The Cree Board of Compensation, the Makivik Corporation and the Naskapi Development Corporation.

- Education

The agreement provided for the establishment of the Cree School Board for Cree villages, the Kativik School Board for the residents of Northern villages, who are mostly Inuit, and a special school for Naskapi students of Kawawachikamach. The use of Indigenous languages for instruction in schools is explicitly encouraged.

- Inuit Education – Section 17

The Kativik Ilisarniliriniq (formerly Kativik School Board) is the only school board that has elementary, high school, and adult education in Nunavik. Under the JBNQA under clause 17.0.3 the KI has jurisdiction for the elementary, high school, and adult education levels. All 14 communities in Nunavik have at least one school under the KI. The KI also provides post-secondary sponsorship program which applies to the beneficiaries of the James Bay and Northern Quebec Agreement who are pursuing their post-secondary education.

Language of Instruction

Under the JBNQA clause 17.0.59 states that the teaching language shall be Inuktitut and with respect to the other language, in accordance with the present practice in the territory.

Cultural Programming

Section 17.0.64 states that the Council may by ordinance provide for the establishment of programs for the teaching of subjects and the use of course materials based on Inuit culture and language. There are Inuktitut classes, culture classes, and culture weeks.

Adapted Calendar

Section 17.0.67 states that the KI may establish by ordinance one or more school calendars, the existing rules serving as guidelines. In Nunavik, the schools have the right to have culture weeks so that they can practice traditional activities, such as hunting and trips. The school board has the mandate to create an adapted calendar to promote these activities.

Teacher Training

Under section 17.0.69, the KI may establish by ordinance special training courses for its teachers. The teacher training is a unique program for the teachers in Nunavik. The Inuit teachers are trained not just about the language, they are also trained about Inuit culture and pedagogy.

- Local government

Cree communities in Quebec were established as Cree villages (municipalities) and Inuit communities of Nunavik were established as Northern villages with universal suffrage for Inuit and non-Inuit residents. In addition, the Cree Regional Authority was established to provide regional government for the Quebec Cree and the Kativik Regional Government was established to provide regional government for the residents of Nunavik (with the exception of the Cree village of Whapmagoostui which is governed by the Cree Regional Authority).

- Inuit Local Government

In the James Bay and Northern Quebec Agreement, Section 12 stated that there will be a local government for each of the villages in Inuit territory north of the 55th parallel. The name of the Northern Villages also commonly known as "NV" is "The Municipality of ___________". They are: Kuujjuaraapik, Umiujaq, Inukjuaq, Puvirnituq, Akulivik, Ivujivik, Salluit, Kangirsujuaq, Quartaq, Kangirsuk, Aupaluk, Tasiujaq, Kuujjuaq, Kangirsualujjuaq. The services from the municipal office are health and hygiene, town planning and land development, public services, traffic and transportation, recreation and culture. For an example, they provide daily water deliveries, sewage disposals/lagoons, run the fire departments, organize recreational/cultural activities, maintain the roads, garbage removal/disposal, lighting, heating, power and snow removal. It is a public government meaning anyone, Inuk or non-Inuk, could run for municipal office. Any Canadian citizen, ordinarily a resident of the village for at least thirty-six months, who has no municipal debts, no contracts with nor working for a NV, no convictions of any crime under the law of Canada is eligible to run. There should be 1 mayor and 2–6 councilors depending on the population of the village. One member of the council is appointed to be the Kativik Regional Government (KRG) representative. Elections for municipal council are much like municipal elections in the rest of Canada. Anyone aged 18 or over, who holds Canadian citizenship, and resident in the territory for at least 12 months is eligible to vote.

- Health and Social Services

Responsibility for health and social services in Cree communities is the responsibility of the Cree Board of Health and Social Services of James Bay. In Nunavik, these services are provided by the Kativik Health and Social Services Council. The JBNQA Section 15 "Health and Social Services (Inuit)" established the framework upon which Québec would now provide capital and operational funding in the health sector. The organization of health and social services remains under the supervision of the provincial system, but it is adapted to the region’s characteristics. The transfer of responsibilities through the JBNQA also resulted in major reorganizations of administrative and budgetary portfolios between Canada and Québec. It also called for the creation of the Nunavik Regional Board of Health and Social Services (NRBHSS) (formerly Kativik Health and Social Services Council) and health establishments, for servicing all persons normally resident or temporarily resident in the administrative Region 10A or the Kativik territory (section 15.0.10).

The NRBSS is an organization dedicated to improving the health and well-being of the populations in its territory. Its overall mission is to adapt the health and social service programs to the population's needs and to the region's realities. It ensures the organization and efficient use of resources granted to the Nunavik region. (presentation made by NRBHSS) It was created in 1995.

Each of the fourteen communities has a local nursing station. Inside their nursing stations, public services include dentists, nurses, doctors, youth protection services, social services. In the smaller communities, the people have to be flown to either Kuujjuaq or Puvirnituq depending on where they live in order to be seen by a doctor and in some cases the people need to be seen by a doctor in the south depending on the severity of the illness. For the Hudson Bay region, the hospital is in Puvirnituq while the Ungava Bay regions hospital is in Kuujjuaq.

== Legacy ==
The political and social context leading up to the agreement was profiled in the 2025 documentary film James Bay 1975: The Shock of Two Nations (Baie James 1975 : le choc des nations).

== Bibliography ==
- James Bay and Northern Québec Agreement and complementary agreements (1998 ed.) (PDF). Sainte-Foy, Quebec: Les Publications du Québec. 1998. ISBN 2-551-17980-7.
- Northeastern Quebec Agreement (1984 ed.) (PDF). Ottawa: Indian and Northern Affairs Canada. 1984.
