= Ashuanipi =

Disputed area in Canada

Territory of Ashuanipi French: Territoire d'Ashuanipi
- Territory of Quebec
- 1899–1927
- Ashuanipi Territory currently claimed by Quebec
- History
  - Established: 1899
  - Disestablished: 1927
| Preceded by | Succeeded by |
| District of Ungava | Dominion of Newfoundland |
- Today part of: Canada: ∟Newfoundland and Labrador

The Territory of Ashuanipi (French: Territoire d'Ashuanipi) was a formerly disputed area and territory of Quebec that was claimed by Quebec and the Dominion of Newfoundland from 1899 and 1927.

Ashuanipi was first devised under the territorial claims of the Quebec Boundary Extension Act, 1898, and then subdivided under the 1899 An Act respecting the territories of Abittibi, Mistassini and Ashuanipi. The territory would be effectively annulled after a 1927 ruling by the Judicial Committee of the Privy Council defining the border between Newfoundland and Canada, but Quebec continues to recognize the region as a territory of Quebec in the Territorial Division Act.

== Description ==
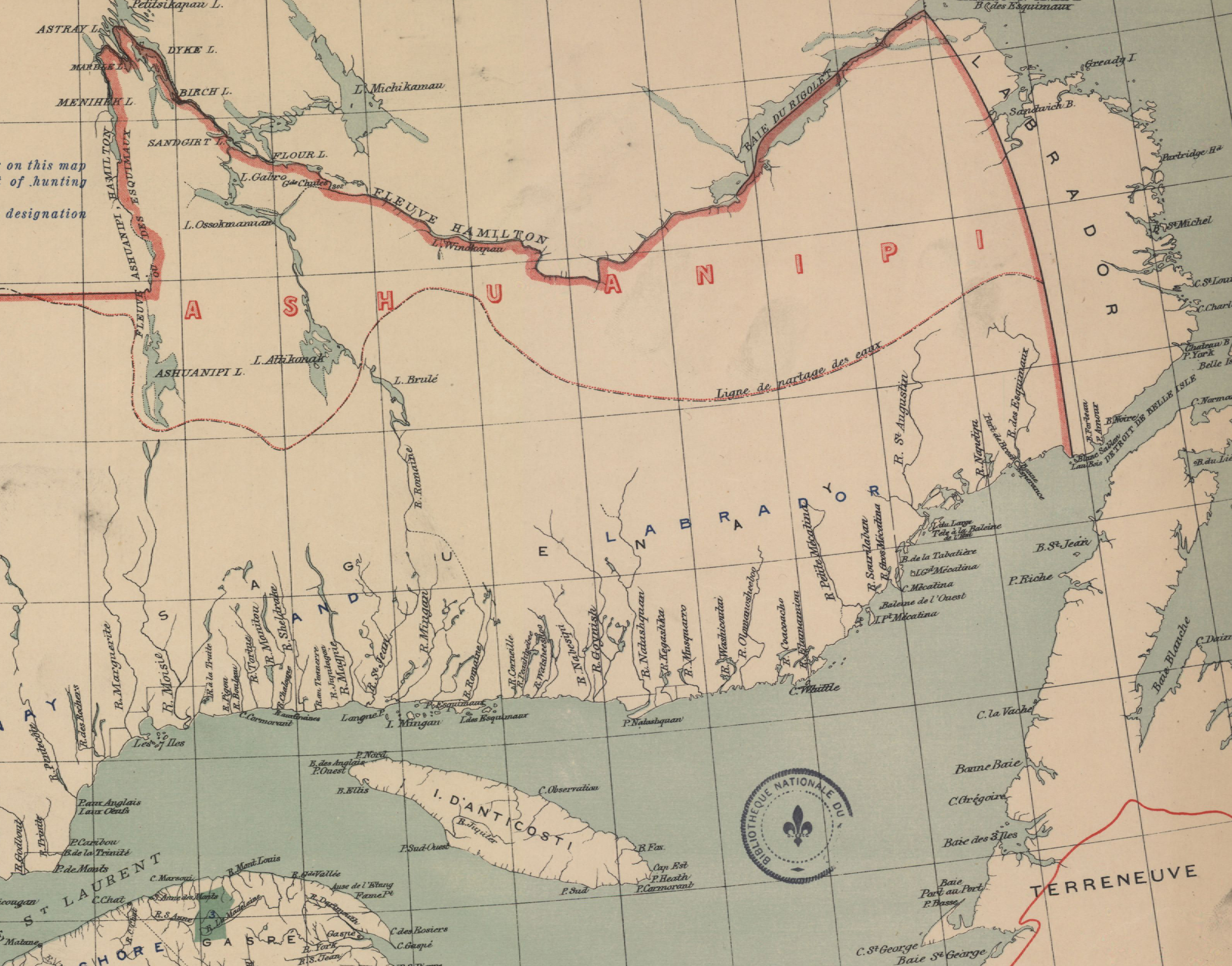
A map of Quebec's Côte-Nord from 1900 with Ashuanipi highlighted

The territory of Ashuanipi was defined under the terms of An Act respecting the territories of Abittibi, Mistassini and Ashuanipi (French: Loi concernant les territoires d'Abittibi, de Mistassini et d'Ashuanipi) of 1899. Article 2.3 of the act read: "The territory of Ashuanipi is bounded to the north, to the east and to the west by the limits of the province; and to the south and southwest by the county of Saguenay". The Revised Statutes of the Province of Quebec (1909) recognized the same description of the territory. The Territorial Division Act's description remains largely the same, but alters the south and southwest portion's boundaries by the "electoral districts of Duplessis and Saguenay".

The territory, as defined by the provisions of the former act, directly included the river basins of the Ashuanipi River, Hamilton River, and Esquimaux River. It additionally included "all other parts of territory watered by water-courses flowing directly towards the Atlantic".

== History ==
When Canada purchased the territory of Rupert's Land from the Hudson's Bay Company in 1870, the potential for territorial expansion northwards became available to the Quebec government. During a session held on April 8, 1885, the Legislative Assembly of Quebec devised a special committee with regards to the potential expansion of the border into the north. The borders that were devised by the committee were adopted by both the Parliament of Quebec and the Parliament of Canada in 1898 as the Boundaries Extension Acts of 1898. In the provisions of An Act respecting the territories of Abittibi, Mistassini and Ashuanipi of 1899, the newly annexed northern territory was divided into three regions. The act decreed that the lands of Abitibi and Mistassini would be annexed alongside it. The area that was claimed remained poorly defined at its eastern frontier, running alongside the Dominion of Newfoundland's claim, whose border was also poorly defined at the time. During its existence as a territory of Quebec, for judicial and registration purposes, the territory of Ashuanipi formed a part of the historical county of Saguenay.

In 1912, a further extension was granted for Quebec under the provisions of the Quebec Boundaries Extension Act, 1912, allowing Quebec's northern border to include that of the remainder of the District of Ungava. This revision continued to be ambiguous with regards to the definition of the territory, continuing to refer to the area on the eastern reaches as the land "over which the island of Newfoundland has lawful jurisdiction".

The territory ceased to exist in 1927, following a ruling by the Judicial Committee of the Privy Council, which ruled that the 52nd parallel north would serve as an effective border between Newfoundland and Canada. As much of Ashuanipi lay north the parallel, the territorial claim was effectively annulled. Quebec continues to assert a claim over the portions between the southern portions of Ashuanipi and the 52nd parallel.

=== Contemporary Quebec ===
Ashuanipi continues to be recognized as a territory within the provisions of the Territorial Division Act. The act's provisions state that it is under the registration division of Sept-Îles, alongside the provincial riding of Duplessis, and the territory of New Québec.

== See also ==
- Newfoundland and Labrador–Quebec border
