= Cree Board of Health and Social Services of James Bay =

Health and social services in the Cree territory of Northern Quebec, Canada

The Cree Board of Health and Social Services of James Bay (CBHSSJB) is responsible for delivering health and social services in the Cree territory of Northern Quebec, Canada. The Cree Board of Health and Social Services of James Bay comes from the James Bay and Northern Quebec Agreement that was settled between the Cree, Inuit, Quebec government and Federal government. The Cree are one of Canada's Indigenous First Nations.

The CBHSSJB presently has a regional hospital centre and nine clinics spread over a geographic area similar in size to France. Clinics offer emergency and family medicine and are called Community Miyupimaatisiiun Centres. Miyupimaatisiuun (literally "being alive well) is the Eastern James Bay Cree word for health. All CMCs have permanent medical staff.

The CBHSSJB has a Public Health Department with the mandate of preventing disease and protecting, measuring and promoting the health of the population. One of the most important challenges facing the Department is an epidemic of obesity and diabetes in the Cree population. Community outreach is strengthened through partnering with other researchers and institutions for research such as the 2018 study by Noreen Willows, Louise Johnson-Down, Jean-Claude Moubarac, Michel Lucas, Elizabeth Robinson & Malek Bata, Factors associated with the intake of traditional foods in the Eeyou Istchee (Cree) of northern Quebec include age, speaking the Cree language and food sovereignty indicators. Partnering in diabetes research dates back to the 1990s. Some of this research has led to the discovery of Awashishinic Acid, a compound in the Cree traditional diet that prevents diabetes.

The CBHSSJB operates youth group homes in Chisasibi and Mistissini and a regional youth rehabilitation centre in Mistissini.

CBHSSJB is also a small press that publishes Indigenous-focused health materials, such as diabetes pamphlets and Indigenous health-focussed books: two of many examples are The Sweet Bloods of the Eeyou Istchee: Stories of Diabetes and the James Bay Cree, The gift of healing : health problems and their treatments (out of print).

== History ==
The Cree Health Board was created in 1978 in the wake of the signing of the James Bay and Northern Quebec Agreement between the Quebec Cree and the Government of Quebec in 1975. Part of this land claim agreement deals with health. Under the agreement the Crees were entitled to the same health services as other Quebecers and Canadians, but they wanted to run their own health services in their own language and in a way which would incorporate traditional values and a Cree ethos.
