= Ungava =

Ungava may refer to:

- The Ungava Peninsula, located in northern Quebec
- Ungava (electoral district), the largest and most northern provincial electoral district of Quebec
- Ungava Bay, on the northern coast of Quebec — on Hudson Strait
- District of Ungava, a former district of the Canadian Northwest Territories, now divided into parts of Quebec and Labrador
- Ungava: a Tale of Esquimaux Land, 1857 novel by R. M. Ballantyne
