= Megagroove =

A megagroove is a large scale (kilometres) linear channel eroded through bedrock by the passage of ice, possibly by plucking of the rock at the sides of the channel by the moving ice. They occur in areas of stratified bedrock which are largely free of till, having been identified in the Assynt area of Northwest Scotland, from Michigan and from Ungava and the North West Territories in Canada.
