= Option Québec =

Option Québec may refer to:

- An Option for Quebec, an essay by former Premier of Quebec René Lévesque published in 1968.
- Option nationale, a political party founded by Jean-Martin Aussant in 2011
