= An Option for Quebec =

- Author: René Lévesque
- Original title: Option Québec
- Translator: McClelland & Stewart
- Genre: Essay
- Publication date: 1968
- English publication date: 1968
- Pages: 128

An Option for Quebec (French: Option Québec) is an essay by former Premier of Quebec René Lévesque published in 1968. The essay presents the constitutional proposal of a group of progressive liberals who, after leaving the Liberal Party of Quebec, formed the Sovereignty-Association Movement.

== Context ==
On September 18, 1967, René Lévesque proposed to the members of the Laurier riding's Liberal Association, the adoption of a resolution he wished to present to the Congress of the Quebec Liberal Federation planned for October 1967. The text he wrote and which was the basis of his speech that day was entitled Un pays qu'il faut faire ("A Country That Must be Made"). That text was to form the first part of An Option for Quebec, published in its French edition a few months later, on January 6, 1968.

On October 14, 1967, René Lévesque left the Congress of the Quebec Liberal Federation and announced in a press conference held at Clarendon Hotel that he had quit the Liberal Party of Quebec and was from now on to sit as an independent member in the Parliament of Quebec. He cited as his reason for leaving the fact that his party had refused to even debate his proposal regarding the constitutional future of Quebec.

On November 18 and 19 1967, some 400 militants participated to the founding meeting of the Sovereignty-Association Movement, which was held at the Couvent Saint-Albert-le-Grand on Chemin de la Côte-Sainte-Catherine in Montreal. After a merger with the Ralliement national led by Gilles Grégoire, the Sovereignty-Association Movement founded a new provincial political party, the Parti Québécois, which placed René Lévesque's Sovereignty-Association idea at the heart of its program. René Lévesque was elected leader of this new party on October 14, 1968.

== Summary ==
The essay opens with a foreword entitled The Moment of Choice signed by Roch Banville, Rosaire Beaule, Gérard Bélanger, Jean-Roch Boivin, Marc Brière, Pothier Ferland, Maurice Jobin, René Lévesque, Monique Marchand, Guy Pelletier and Réginald Savoie. The foreword is followed by a preface by historian Jean Blain.

The substance of the essay consists of three parts and a short conclusion. The book ends with an epilogue by Quebec documentary film director Pierre Perrault.

=== Part one ===
The first part (17 pages), is entitled A Country That Must be Made and contains six small chapters advancing the reasons for Quebecers to make the double choice of independence for Quebec and a new economic union with Canada. Chapter I ("Belonging") treats of the collective personality of Quebecers. Chapter II (The Acceleration of History) discuses the challenge that modernity poses to the preservation of the collective personality of the Quebec people and suggests that the only way to dissipate the danger of the assimilation of its francophone majority is "to face up to this trying and thoughtless age and make it accept us as we are". Chapter III (The Quiet Revolution) discuses the catch up and progress accomplished by the Quebec nation since the Quiet Revolution. In chapter IV (The Basic Minimums), Lévesque points out the limitations of the centenary Canadian federal framework (1867–1967) if Quebec is to enjoy the basic amount of internal autonomy it needs to continue on the way of progress as it has been doing since 1960. In chapter V (The Blind Alley), Lévesque remarks that the vital minimum for Quebec is a "frightening maximum, completely unacceptable" for English Canada which needs the central State of Canada "for its own security and progress as much as we need our own State of Quebec". Chapter VI (The Way of the Future) presents the alternative of René Lévesque to what he describes as the blind alley of maintaining or adapting the political status quo. He invites his readers to reject Canadian federalism entirely and proposes a sovereign Quebec ("complete liberty in Quebec") that would be associated to the rest of Canada as part of a new Canadian Union modelled on the precedents of the European Economic Community, Scandinavia or Benelux.

=== Part two ===
The second part (25 pages), entitled A Country that Is "Feasible", is made of two chapters describing the "Option for Quebec" in more details. This part is introduced by a short text of Bernard Chenot (From Politics to Economics) treating of the economic organization of the State. The first chapter (The Association) presents the association that Quebec would propose to Canada, that is to say a monetary union and a common market. The monetary union would be carried out on the basis of an accord renewable every five years. The second chapter (The Transition Period) deals with the question of the steps Quebec would have to go through to reach the status of a sovereign State. It discuses the financing of the state and the means of retaining investments in Quebec.

=== Part three ===
The third part (68 pages) consists of seven appendices which serve as documentation of the first two parts of the essay.

Appendix 1 (Some Varieties of Special Status) cites authors who wrote on the special status which Quebec would in their opinion need to ensure the future of its development and the conservation of its particular collective personality within the framework of a reformed Canadian federalism. The works cited are Equality or Independence by Daniel Johnson, Sr. (published in 1965), Le Québec dans le Canada de demain (published in 1967) and comprising texts by Marcel Faribault, Jean-Guy Cardinal and Claude Ryan, as well as an excerpt of the report of the Committee on Constitutional Affairs of the Quebec Liberal Federation presided by Paul Gérin-Lajoie and prepared for the Congress of October 1967.

Appendix 2 (Neo-Centralization) contains the point of view of senator Maurice Lamontagne, who, in two articles published in Le Devoir on September 23 and 25, 1967, rejected the special status thesis of Claude Ryan and proposed a "cooperative federalism" in which René Lévesque saw nothing but a way to re-centralize powers in Ottawa.

Appendix 3 (Québec-Canada: A Blind Alley) reproduces a talk given by economist and future Premier of Quebec Jacques Parizeau in Banff, Alberta, on October 17, 1967.

Appendix 4 (The Snare of Biculturalism) gives the statistics available at the time concerning the assimilation of out-of-Quebec francophone minorities and argues that it is not possible to reanimate the cultural life of these minority groups simply by offering them the status the Anglophone "minority" of Quebec enjoys, as proposed by the report of the Royal Commission on Bilingualism and Biculturalism. The report, in addition, does not propose an answer to the question of the integration of immigrants to Quebec society. The appendix reproduces a text by René Lévesque dated December 3, 1967, and an excerpt of an essay by Richard Arès published in the November issue of the Relations review.

Appendix 5 (Association of Sovereign States) is a dossier on the functioning of the European Union and Scandinavia. The appendix includes an excerpt of the Treaty of Rome of March 25, 1957, which is at the origin of the Common Market of Europe.

Appendix 6 (Other Testimony) reprints two texts: Sovereignty, Condition of Salvation by Jean-Marc Léger (writer) (not to be confused with the pollster of the same name), initially published in Le Devoir on October 23, 24 and 25, 1967, and Quebec's Independence: Condition of Quebec's Salvation, Guarantee of Peace for Canada by Doris Lussier, excerpted from an interview he gave to Échos-Vedettes on November 11, 1967.

Appendix 7 (Operation Panic) analyzes the flight of capital from Quebec which made the news soon after October 18, 1967, which is to say just after René Lévesque released the manifesto that forms the first part of An Option for Quebec.

== Reception ==
More than 50,000 copies of Option Québec, the French-language original, were sold in the weeks after its release. Even before its publication, the Liberal Party of Quebec gave a flat refusal to the constitutional option promoted by René Lévesque in his essay. The party instead resolved on a special status for Quebec in a reformed Canadian federation, as recommended in Paul Gérin-Lajoie's October 1967 report. The Union Nationale, as well as the main federal political parties of Canada equally opposed it.

== Editions ==
The first French-language edition was published in 1968 at Éditions de l'Homme in Montreal and Laffont in Paris. The work was reprinted in Montreal in 1988, preceded by an essay of political scientist André Bernard entitled Option Québec 1968-1988. Another edition was published in 1997 by TYPO, preceded by an updated version of André Bernard's essay.

In English translation, the book was published by McClelland & Stewart in 1968 and again in 1977, after the election of the Parti Québécois.
