= L'Action nationale =

French-language publication in Quebec, Canada

- Type: Monthly
- Format: Tabloid
- Owner(s): Independent
- Editor: Robert Laplante
- Founded: 1917
- Political alignment: Sovereigntism, social democracy
- Website: action-nationale.qc.ca

L'Action nationale (ISSN 0001-7469) is a French-language monthly published in Quebec, Canada.

The magazine publishes critical analyses of Quebec's linguistic, social, cultural and economic realities. Since 1917, approximately 17,000 authors have appeared in it, including such Quebec intellectuals such as André Laurendeau, Pierre Vadeboncoeur, Pierre Trudeau, Lionel Groulx, Marcel Rioux, Richard Ares, Fernand Dumont and Esdras Minville.

At first a Catholic-Nationalist publication, L'Action nationale moved to a secular, separatist stance, and became one of the main inspirations for Québécois nationalism in the 1960s, the decade that saw the Quiet Revolution and the first successes of the Parti québécois.

== History ==
L'Action nationale was founded in 1917 under the name L'action française (French Action) by members of the Ligue des droits du français (League for French Rights). It was published in Montreal from 1917 to 1927. The first director was Omer Héroux. He was followed by the Catholic priest Lionel Groulx, whose name would become strongly associated with the periodical.

With his colleagues, Groulx dedicated himself to the defense of the French Language, the Catholic Church, traditional values, and agriculture; all of which seemed under threat from Quebec's industrialization and urbanization. The journal also aimed to find solutions to the problem of economic and intellectual (educational) development in Quebec. Two annual reports were particularly notable. The 1922 report examined the possibility of Quebec's independence, and the 1927 report criticized the place allotted to Quebec and French Canadians since Canadian Confederation in 1867.

The periodical was associated with Integralism, a right-wing nationalist movement founded by French thinker Charles Maurras and the organization he founded, which like the magazine was called Action française. Integralist ideas were used by French Canadian intellectuals in debates about culture, politics, and identity. In Quebec, L'Action française was first the name of a periodical, but also the name of a league (1921–1927), which was supported by a group of self-styled defenders of the French language. The league was also led by Lionel Groulx, who was its theoretician. Its members advocated the defense of the French language, family, and rural life. The league defended the idea of an independent state for French Canadians which would protect them against the threats of urban, modern life. Some members of the league had personal contacts with the directors of the French organization Action française, and borrowed from Maurras' thought a hostility to parliamentary democracy; a distinction between 'official' countries and 'real' nations; and various ideas about art. After Maurras' Action française was condemned by the Pope in 1926, the Québécois organization changed its name to L'Action canadienne française (French Canadian Action)

In January 1933, the journal changed its name to L'Action nationale. Esdras Minville, its new director, attempted to follow the nationalist line of Lionel-Groulx, taking for his motto "Québec d'abord!" (Quebec First!). The first issue under the new name was published in Montreal in January, 1933. However, its editorial line was slowly changed by a new generation of contributors, who took a more secularist and sovereigntist line. In 1963, L'Action nationale took over the periodical Tradition et progrès (tradition and progress).

Jean-Claude Dupuis, a researcher at the Laval University in Quebec City, argues that "from the start, L'Action française made it clear that its nationalism was above all an economic nationalism." According to Dupius, the daily newspaper of the L'Action française was the most important intellectual review in Quebec in the 1920s. Moreover, he says that alongside the École sociale populaire, a Jesuit-founded organization that promoted Social Catholicism, it was "at the heart of the definition and diffusion of the ideology usually referred to as 'clerico-nationalist', but which we prefer to call by the term 'traditionalist'."

Today the journal's publishers define its philosophy in these terms: "L'Action nationale is published by the Ligue d'action national with the mission of being a hub for the Quebec sovereignty movement, in which the aspirations of Quebec can be debated by the French-speaking community following a tradition of critical reflection, independence, and engagement, focusing on current events that reflect the fundamental issues of our shared future."

The current director of the magazine is Robert Laplante.

== See also ==
- Quebec nationalism
- List of newspapers in Canada

== Bibliography ==
- Charles-Philippe Courtois, Trois mouvements intellectuels québécois et leurs relations françaises : l'Action française, La Relève et La Nation (1917–1939), Thèse de doctorat, Histoire, IEP-Paris et UQAM, 2008. « »
- Denis Monière et Robert Laplante, « 90e anniversaire de la revue L'Action nationale - Savoir durer », dans Le Devoir, 29 octobre, 2007
- Rosaire Morin, « Les origines de L'Action nationale », dans L'Action nationale, Montréal, avril 2000, (page consultée le 2 avril 2006)
- François-Albert Angers, « L’Action nationale et son fondateur : Esdras Minville », dans L’Action nationale, Vol. LXXII, No 5 (janvier 1983) : 397-407
- Marcel-Aimé Gagnon, « Esdras Minville et l’Action nationale », dans L’Action nationale, Vol. LXV, Nos 9-10 (mai-juin 1976) : 677-688
- Susan Mann, Lionel Groulx et l’Action française, Montréal, VLB, 2005.
- Catherine Pomeyrols, « Les intellectuels nationalistes québécois et la condamnation de l’Action française », dans Vingtième Siècle. Revue d’histoire, 73, janvier-mars 2002, pp. 83–98.
- Catherine Bouchard, Les nations québécoises dans l'Action nationale. De la décolonisation à la mondialisation, Québec, Presses de l'Université Laval, 2002, xiv-146 p.
- Pascale Ryan, Penser la nation. La Ligue d'Action nationale, 1917-1960, Montréal, Leméac, 2006.
