= Mouvement Souveraineté-Association =

Defunct Quebec separatist movement

The Mouvement Souveraineté-Association (MSA, English: Movement for Sovereignty-Association) was a separatist movement formed on November 19, 1967 by René Lévesque to promote the concept of sovereignty-association between Quebec and the rest of Canada.

Formerly a member of the Quebec Liberal Party, René Lévesque quit the party with a few hundred others after his proposal of a sovereign Quebec associated to the rest of Canada was rejected during a party convention. The MSA quickly began to move for a merger of all the independence movements in Quebec, which at the time were the Rassemblement pour l'indépendance nationale (RIN) and the Ralliement national (RN).

In January 1968, the MSA published the manifesto Option Québec. From April 19 to 21, it held its first Congrès d'orientation with its 7300 members. The convention led to the publication of a groundwork document entitled Ce pays qu'on peut bâtir (This country that we can build) and the decision to create a new political party dedicated to Sovereignty-Association.

From October 11 to 14, the MSA held its first national congress in Quebec City. The merger of the MSA and the RN created the Parti Québécois (PQ). MSA leader René Lévesque was elected president of the PQ, and RN leader Gilles Grégoire became vice-president.

On October 26 Pierre Bourgault, leader of the RIN, dissolved the party and invited its members to join the PQ.

The short-lived MSA had served its purpose: sovereigntist forces in Quebec were united under a single party. Three elections later, the PQ won the 1976 provincial election, with historic consequences.

== See also ==
- Parti Québécois
- Quebec Sovereignism
- Politics of Quebec
- List of Canadian political parties
- Secessionist movements of Canada
