= Government of Quebec =

Canadian provincial government

- French: Gouvernement du Québec
- Provincial government
- Logo of the Government of Quebec

Overview
- Established: July 1, 1867
- Country: Canada
- Polity: Province
- Leader: Premier; Paul St-Pierre Plamondon
- Appointed by: Lieutenant Governor; Manon Jeannotte
- Main organ: Executive Council
- Responsible to: National Assembly
- Headquarters: Quebec City
- Website: www.quebec.ca

The Government of Quebec (French: gouvernement du Québec, pronounced [ɡuvɛʁnəmɑ̃ dy kebɛk]) is the body responsible for the administration of the Canadian province of Quebec. The term usually refers to the executive of the day (the premier and the other ministers of the Crown) and the non-partisan public service they direct. In French, the province’s official language, the name is Gouvernement du Québec.

Quebec is a constitutional monarchy and parliamentary democracy in the Westminster tradition. The premier is head of government The Conseil du trésor supports the ministers of the Executive Council. The sovereign, Charles III, King of Canada, is head of state and is represented in the province by the lieutenant governor. These institutions date from Quebec’s entry into Confederation in 1867.

Quebec's constitution enshrines social and cultural traditions reflected in judicial judgments and legislative documents, including the Loi sur l'Assemblée Nationale ("Law on the National Assembly"), the Loi sur l'éxecutif ("Law on the Executive"), and the Loi électorale du Québec ("Electoral Law of Quebec"). Other notable examples include the Charter of Human Rights and Freedoms, the Charter of the French language, and the Civil Code of Quebec.

Legislative power is held by the Parliament of Quebec, consisting of the Lieutenant Governor and the National Assembly.

Various ministries are responsible for matter such as education, welfare services, agriculture, and the environment.

The province has a variety of subdivisions, including administrative regions, territories, and municipalities.

== Role of the Crown ==
Charles III is King in right of Quebec. The Crown is shared with the federal government and the other provinces, and with the other Commonwealth realms. The lieutenant governor represents the King of Canada, ordinarily in accord with the binding advice of the premier and the Executive Council of Quebec.

The Premier is asked by the Crown to form a government after securing the confidence of the National Assembly of Quebec, normally by leading the party or coalition with a majority of seats.

== Executive ==
The lieutenant governor is appointed by the Governor General of Canada on the advice of the Prime Minister of Canada.

The premier (premier ministre du Québec) is the first minister. The premier chairs Cabinet, chooses its members, and advises the lieutenant governor on the exercise of executive power and most of the royal prerogative. Premiers remain in office while they command the confidence of the Assembly, and leave office on resignation or on dismissal after a loss of confidence or a general election. Advice is not binding if the premier has lost, or does not clearly hold, the confidence of the Assembly. The incumbent lieutenant governor is Manon Jeannotte, who assumed office on 25 January 2024.

The Cabinet is formally the Executive Council (Conseil exécutif; also Conseil des ministres). The Secrétariat du Conseil du trésor supports ministers in the stewardship of public funds and the public service.

Unlike Canada's other provinces, a new session of the National Assembly opens with an Opening Speech by the premier, not a speech from the throne by the lieutenant governor.

Paul St-Pierre Plamondon of the Parti Québécois has been premier since 21 October 2026.

== Legislature ==
Legislative power is vested in the Parliament of Quebec, composed of the lieutenant governor and the unicameral National Assembly (Assemblée nationale du Québec). The Assembly formerly had 125 members; the legislature elected in 2026 has 127. Members are styled Members of the National Assembly (MNAs).

Quebec has no single entrenched constitutional statute. Provincial institutions rest on the Constitution Act, 1867, later constitutional amendments, and provincial statutes including the Act respecting the National Assembly, the Executive Power Act, and the Election Act, together with the Charter of Human Rights and Freedoms (Quebec), the Charter of the French Language, and the Civil Code of Quebec.

The Parliament of the 43rd legislature includes the following parties: Coalition Avenir Québec (CAQ), Parti libéral du Québec (PLQ), Québec solidaire (QS) and Parti Québécois (PQ), as well as an independent member from among 25 official political parties.

== Federal representation ==
Quebec elects 78 members of Parliament to the House of Commons of Canada and is allotted 24 seats in the Senate of Canada. Senators are appointed by the governor general on the advice of the prime minister.

== Administration ==
The government exercises legislative and executive authority in areas of provincial jurisdiction under sections 92, 92A and 93 of the Constitution Act, 1867, including property and civil rights, municipal institutions, education, health, natural resources, and the administration of justice. Three offices defend Quebec's interests: Moncton engages western provinces, Toronto eastern provinces, and Ottawa the national government.

=== Ministries and policies ===
Quebec's Ministry of International Relations coordinates international policy, although Quebec's general delegations implement that policy abroad. Quebec is the only province that has a ministry for international relations.

The Ministry of Sustainable Development, Environment, and Fight Against Climate Change (MELCC) is responsible for provincial environmental policy. The Société des établissements de plein air du Québec (SEPAQ) is responsible for national parks and wildlife reserves. Quebec adopted a plan to meet the objectives of the Kyoto Protocol.

The Ministry of Agriculture, Fisheries and Food (MAPAQ) is responsible for farming and fisheries policy. Agricultural zones protect fertile land from development, totaling 2% of Quebec's lands.

The Ministry of Energy and Natural Resources are responsible for Quebec's forests, which are essentially public property. The Bureau du forestier en chef defines annual timber quotas. The Union des producteurs agricoles (UPA) protects the interests of its members, including forestry workers.

The Ministère de l'Emploi et de la Solidarité sociale du Québec oversees social and workforce developments through Emploi-Québec and its local employment centres (CLE). It is also responsible for managing the Régime québécois d'assurance parentale (QPIP) as well as last-resort financial support for people in need. The Commission des normes, de l'équité, de la santé et de la sécurité du travail (CNESST) is the main body responsible for labour laws in Quebec and for enforcing agreements concluded between unions and their employers.

Revenu Québec is responsible for collecting taxes. It takes its revenue through a progressive income tax, a 9.975% sales tax, other provincial taxes (ex. carbon, corporate and capital gains taxes), equalization payments, transfer payments from other provinces, and direct payments. By some measures Quebec residents are the most taxed; a 2012 study indicated that "Quebec companies pay 26 per cent more in taxes than the Canadian average".

The Ministère de l'Immigration et des Communautés culturelles du Québec is responsible for the selection and integration of immigrants. Quebec's immigration philosophy is based on pluralism and interculturalism. Programs favour immigrants who speak French, have a low risk of becoming criminals and have in-demand skills via a points system.

Ministry of Health and Social Services administers Quebec's health and social services network. It is composed of 95 réseaux locaux de services (RLS; 'local service networks') and 18 agences de la santé et des services sociaux (ASSS; 'health and social services agencies'). Régie de l'assurance maladie du Québec (RAMQ) supports the health system.

The Ministère de la Famille et des Aînés du Québec operate centres de la petite enfance (CPEs; 'centres for young children'). Quebec provides universal low-fee childcare for all children under 12.

Quebec's Ministry of Education and Higher Education administers primary and secondary schools, while the Ministère de l'Enseignement supérieur (CEGEP) and the Conseil supérieure de l'Education du Québec manage universities and colleges. In 2012, the annual cost for postsecondary tuition was CA$2,168 (€1,700) – less than half of Canada's average tuition. Part of the reason is that tuition fees were frozen at a relatively low level when CEGEPS were created. When Jean Charest's government decided in 2012 to sharply increase university fees, students protests erupted. Because of these protests, Quebec's tuition fees remain relatively low.

== Territorial administration ==
For regional administration the province is divided into 17 administrative regions. Municipal government comprises local municipalities of several legal types, regional county municipalities, two metropolitan communities (Montreal and Quebec City), the Kativik Regional Government in Nunavik, and unorganized territories.

The province is divided into judicial districts and land-registration divisions (circonscriptions foncières).

=== Subdivisions ===
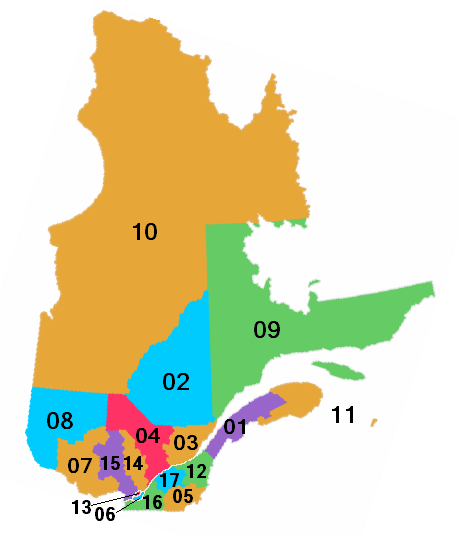
The seventeen administrative regions of Quebec

Quebec's territory is divided into 17 administrative regions as follows:

For municipal purposes, Quebec is composed of:

- Bas-Saint-Laurent
- Saguenay–Lac-Saint-Jean
- Capitale-Nationale
- Mauricie
- Estrie
- Montréal
- Outaouais
- Abitibi-Témiscamingue
- Côte-Nord
- Nord-du-Québec
- Gaspésie–Îles-de-la-Madeleine
- Chaudière-Appalaches
- Laval
- Lanaudière
- Laurentides
- Montérégie
- Centre-du-Québec

These include 1,117 local municipalities of various types:

  - 11 agglomerations (agglomérations) grouping 42 of these local municipalities
  - 45 boroughs (arrondissements) within 8 of these local municipalities
- 89 regional county municipalities or RCMs (municipalités régionales de comté, MRC)
- 2 metropolitan communities (communautés métropolitaines)
- the regional Kativik administration
- the unorganised territories

The province also has the following divisions:

  - 4 territories (Abitibi, Ashuanipi, Mistassini and Nunavik) which group together the lands that once formed the District of Ungava
  - 36 judicial districts
  - 73 circonscriptions foncières
  - 125 electoral districts

== See also ==
- Politics of Quebec
- Monarchy in Quebec
- National Assembly of Quebec
- Quebec law
- Lieutenant Governor of Quebec
- Premier of Quebec
- Quebec Legislature
- Legislative Assembly of Quebec
- Executive Council of Quebec
