= Non ultra petita =

Principle in civil law

In law, the principle of non ultra petita, meaning "not beyond the request" in Latin, means that a court may not decide more than it has been asked to. In particular, the court may not award more to the winning party than it requested. The same principle is expressed in the Latin brocard Ne eat iudex ultra petita partium, often abbreviated to ne ultra petita.

The principle is a traditional basis of the rules of procedure governing civil and administrative litigation in continental legal systems, and in public international law. In contrast, it does not apply in criminal proceedings.

It is closely related to the disposition principle (also called "principle of party disposition" or "principle of free disposition"), also a traditional feature of continental legal systems. It states that in civil and administrative cases, the parties are free to dispose of their claims – advancing, withholding or withdrawing them as they see fit – and may thereby control the course of the litigation.
