= Congress on the French language in Canada =

Scientific convention

The Congress on the French Language in Canada (French: Congrès de la langue française au Canada) was a scientific convention that met on three occasions, in 1912, 1937 and 1952, to discuss the situation of the French language in Canada (and generally in North America) and find solutions to ensure its survival. A fourth Congress entirely devoted to the refrancization of Quebec was held in 1957.

== First Congress (June 24 to June 30, 1912) ==
The First Congress on the French Language in Canada (Premier Congrès de la langue française au Canada) was held at Université Laval in Quebec City from June 24 to June 30, 1912. Its stated objective was to "examine the questions raised by the defence, the culture and the development of the French language and literature in Canada."

== Second Congress (June 27 to July 1st, 1937) ==
The Second Congress on the French Language in Canada (Deuxième Congrès de la langue française au Canada) was held at Université Laval in Quebec City from June 27 to 1 July 1937. The theme of the second congress was "The French spirit in Canada, in our language, our laws, our habits" (L'esprit français au Canada, dans notre langue, dans nos lois, dans nos mœurs).

== Third Congress (June 18 to June 26, 1952) ==
The Third Congress on the French Language in Canada (Troisième Congrès de la langue française au Canada) was held in Quebec City, Montreal and Saint-Hyacinthe, from June 18 to June 26, 1952. The theme of this third congress was "Let us preserve our cultural heritage" (Conservons notre héritage culturel).

== Refrancization Congress (June 21 to June 24, 1957) ==
The Refrancization Congress (Congrès de la refrancisation) was held at Université Laval in Quebec City from June 21 to June 24, 1957.
