= Nitchequon =

Ghost town in Quebec

Coordinates: 53°11′48.8″N 70°52′58.7″W

Nitchequon (NITCH-e-kun) is a ghost town that was an inland trading post of the Hudson's Bay Company in the remote geographic centre of Quebec, Canada. It is believed to have operated during 1816–22, 1825 and 1834–1943.

== History ==
Historically, there was a community of Cree inhabiting Nitchequon as well as some Naskapi residents.

The Hudson Bay Company used Nitchequon as a stop or trading post along the fur-trader routes. French-Canadian canoe voyageurs (brigades) would stop at Nitchequon to exchange furs for supplies. However, due to its remote location and the fact it was the Hudson's Bay Company's farthest trading post, it was not cost-effective for the Hudson's Bay Company to continue running it. As a result, it closed in 1943.

The Hudson's Bay Company re-opened the Nitchequon trade post around 1950, using air transport instead of canoe brigades. However, it was closed again around the 1960s it is believed, and most Cree residents moved to Mistissini.

== Geography ==
Nitchequon is located on Lac Nichicun in a remote area of Quebec. The elevation is 536 metres or 1,759 feet. Historically, this area was part of Labrador.

=== Climate ===
As is typical for its region, Nitchequon has a harsh subarctic climate (Köppen Dfc), with mild, wet summers strongly cooled by the frigid, low-salinity Hudson Bay and the Labrador Current to the east, and severe, extremely snowy winters chilled by the freezing of the shallow Hudson Bay and prevailing winds from the Arctic and the Greenland Ice Sheet. The influence of the Icelandic Low makes precipitation very high for a subarctic climate, especially in the summer.

Climate data for Nitchequon
Month	Jan	Feb	Mar	Apr	May	Jun	Jul	Aug	Sep	Oct	Nov	Dec	Year
Mean daily maximum °C (°F)	−17.8 (0.0)	−15.3 (4.5)	−8.0 (17.6)	−0.3 (31.5)	6.7 (44.1)	14.9 (58.8)	17.9 (64.2)	16.0 (60.8)	9.9 (49.8)	2.9 (37.2)	−4.7 (23.5)	−14.4 (6.1)	0.6 (33.2)
Daily mean °C (°F)	−23.5 (−10.3)	−21.8 (−7.2)	−15.1 (4.8)	−6.2 (20.8)	1.8 (35.2)	9.7 (49.5)	13.6 (56.5)	12.0 (53.6)	6.5 (43.7)	0.0 (32.0)	−8.0 (17.6)	−19.3 (−2.7)	−4.2 (24.5)
Mean daily minimum °C (°F)	−29.4 (−20.9)	−28.4 (−19.1)	−22.3 (−8.1)	−12.2 (10.0)	−3.1 (26.4)	4.6 (40.3)	9.2 (48.6)	7.9 (46.2)	3.0 (37.4)	−3.0 (26.6)	−11.6 (11.1)	−24.3 (−11.7)	−9.1 (15.6)
Average precipitation mm (inches)	38.5 (1.52)	30.9 (1.22)	44.9 (1.77)	40.8 (1.61)	57.5 (2.26)	87.7 (3.45)	112.4 (4.43)	119.6 (4.71)	107.7 (4.24)	82.1 (3.23)	60.6 (2.39)	44.4 (1.75)	827.1 (32.58)
Average rainfall mm (inches)	0 (0)	0.6 (0.02)	3.3 (0.13)	7.7 (0.30)	39.2 (1.54)	81.7 (3.22)	112.4 (4.43)	117.7 (4.63)	97.8 (3.85)	41.8 (1.65)	13.4 (0.53)	2.1 (0.08)	517.6 (20.38)
Average snowfall cm (inches)	41.7 (16.4)	34.4 (13.5)	45.0 (17.7)	34.2 (13.5)	18.5 (7.3)	5.0 (2.0)	0 (0)	1.9 (0.7)	10.2 (4.0)	41.4 (16.3)	50.3 (19.8)	45.6 (18.0)	328.2 (129.2)
Average precipitation days (≥ 0.1mm)	14	13	13	13	15	16	18	18	18	19	20	17	194
Average rainy days (≥ 0.2 mm)	—	—	1	3	9	15	18	19	17	10	3	—	96
Average snowy days (≥ 0.2 cm)	18	14	15	11	7	2	—	—	5	14	19	17	122
Average relative humidity (%) (at 15:00 local standard time)	78	78	78	73	66	60	63	66	73	81	85	82	74
Source: Environment Canada

== Current status ==
In 1986, the Canadian government closed the weather station. Today, Nitchequon is a ghost town.
