= Old Harry oil field =

Oil field in Canada

The Old Harry oil field, on the boundary between Quebec and Newfoundland and Labrador

The Old Harry oil field is an oil field in the Gulf of St. Lawrence off Newfoundland and Labrador and Quebec.
