= Doris Lussier =

Canadian comedian and actor

Doris Lussier (15 July 1918, Fontainebleau, Estrie, Quebec – 28 October 1993) was a French Canadian comedian and actor, and political activist. He was for many years the personal secretary of Georges-Henri Lévesque, but became famous as a comedian with the character of Père Gédéon, which was later included in the television series Les Plouffes.

Lussier was a close friend of René Lévesque and was involved in the Quebec sovereignty movement. He died in 1993, aged 75.
