= Richard Arès =

- Born: January 7, 1910; Marieville, Quebec
- Died: August 9, 1989 (aged 79)
- Awards: Order of Canada

Richard Arès, OC (January 7, 1910 – August 9, 1989) was a French Canadian humanist and writer.

Born in Marieville, Quebec, the son of Georges Arès and Dorila Théberge, he was ordained a Jesuit Priest in 1944. From 1974 to 1975, he was President of Académie I of the Royal Society of Canada.

In 1979, he was made an Officer of the Order of Canada "in recognition of the important role he has played in the cultural life of his fellow citizens".
