= Quebec Boundaries Extension Act, 1912 =

Parliament of Canada

Evolution of the borders of the Province of Quebec

The Quebec Boundaries Extension Act, 1912 (French: Loi de l’extension des frontières de Québec) was passed by the Parliament of Canada on April 1, 1912. It expanded the territory of the Province of Quebec, extending the northern boundary to its present location. The act transferred to the province all of the Northwest Territories' former District of Ungava except offshore islands. This is a vast area bounded by the Eastmain River, the Labrador coast, and Hudson and Ungava Bays. It was first claimed by England in 1670 as Rupert's Land by royal decree, becoming part of Canada after Confederation. The indigenous people of the region are Cree, Montagnais, Naskapi, and Inuit.

The Quebec Boundary Extension Act, 1898 had granted the province its first territorial enlargement into the Northwest Territories. The 1912 act was pursuant to a resolution of the House of Commons of Canada on 13 July 1908, which also led to the Manitoba Boundaries Extension Act, 1912 and Ontario Boundaries Extension Act, 1912, which transferred more territory around Hudson Bay to Manitoba and Ontario from the Northwest Territories' District of Keewatin.

Canada and Newfoundland disagreed on the location of the frontier between Quebec and Labrador until 1927. The Canadian government accepted Newfoundland's claimed frontier, however Quebec continues to dispute it: see Newfoundland and Labrador–Quebec border.
