= Quebec Boundary Extension Act, 1898 =

1898 Canadian law

Parliament of Canada

Evolution of the borders of the Province of Quebec

The Quebec Boundary Extension Act, 1898 was an Act of the Parliament of Canada that expanded the territory of the province of Quebec. The province's northern boundary was set along the eastern shore of James Bay to the mouth of the Eastmain River, north along the river, then due east to the Hamilton River and down the river to the western boundary of Labrador. The area was part of the North-West Territories, formerly Rupert's Land, claimed by England in 1670.

The first of two such acts, a second act was passed by Parliament in 1912 and entitled the Quebec Boundaries Extension Act, 1912. Together, these two expansions more than tripled the size of the Province of Quebec to what it is today.
