= District of Ungava =

Part of the Northwest Territories, Canada (1895–1920)

- District of North-West Territories
- 1895–1920
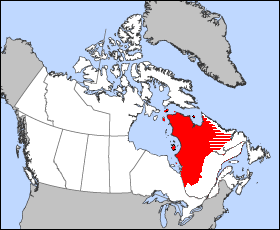
- District of Ungava at its creation in 1895, superimposed over a modern-day map of Canada.
- History
  - Established: 1895
  - Disestablished: 1920
- Today part of: Newfoundland and Labrador, Nunavut, Quebec

The District of Ungava was a regional administrative district of Canada's Northwest Territories from 1895 to 1920, although it effectively ceased operation in 1912. It covered the northern portion of what is today Quebec, the interior of Labrador, and the offshore islands to the west and north of Quebec, which are now part of Nunavut.

The name "Ungava" is of Inuktitut origin, meaning "towards the open water". It is believed to be in reference to the lands inhabited by the Ungava Inuit, who lived at the mouth of the Arnaud River which flows into Ungava Bay.

== Political history ==
When created in 1895, the District of Ungava covered all of modern-day northern Quebec, the interior of modern-day Labrador, and all the islands in James Bay, the Hudson Strait, Ungava Bay, and the eastern side of Hudson Bay.

Ungava's southern continental boundaries initially ranged as far south as Lake Timiskaming, well below James Bay on the modern Ontario/Quebec border. Note, however, that a dispute over the location of the boundary between Canada and Labrador (a dependency of the Dominion of Newfoundland) meant both Canada and Newfoundland claimed the far eastern portion of Ungava, an area shown in shaded red on the accompanying maps. This boundary dispute would not be settled during the time the district of Ungava was in existence.

At the time of its creation, Ungava covered over one million square kilometres (390,000 mi^{2}), although just under 15% of its area was also claimed by Newfoundland. However, just three years later with the adoption of the Quebec Boundary Extension Act, 1898, the southernmost portion of the District of Ungava (excluding offshore islands) was transferred by the Parliament of Canada to Quebec. All told, the act transferred approximately 250,000 square kilometres (97,000 sq mi) of Ungava to Quebec, the majority of which now lies in the modern-day Jamésie region of the province. After the transfer was complete, the mainland area of the District of Ungava reached no further south than the mouth of the Eastmain River—about halfway down James Bay, as shown on the accompanying map.

With the Quebec Boundaries Extension Act, 1912, all of Ungava's remaining continental land was transferred to Quebec. The almost entirely uninhabited offshore islands of Ungava (over 1,500 of them) were not officially transferred to the District of Keewatin in the Northwest Territories until 1920, at which point the District of Ungava (which had not functioned in any administrative capacity for eight years) formally ceased to exist.

== Population ==
The 1901 census of Canada records 843 people living in the Ungava district. However, one census taker of the time notes that for the Ungava trading post of Great Whale River, there was extreme difficulty in making an accurate count of the area's population, due to the nomadic nature of its residents, as well as their extreme isolation. The official 1901 census count for Great Whale River numbers 216, but the census taker notes of this figure: "I should say it does not represent one-third of the Eskimos, but I am sending on as many (names) as I could obtain." A similar case could be made for the 1901 census figures for Ungava as a whole, giving the district an effective population of upwards of 3,000.

The 1911 Census of Canada enumerated only two population centres in Ungava: Nitchequon, which had a population of 62, and Charlton Island, the southernmost of the offshore islands in James Bay, which had a population of 27. No other parts of Ungava were listed in the 1911 census records, although it is reasonable to assume an overall 1911 population similar to 1901.

The Ungava district was largely inhabited by the aboriginal Cree, Innu (called "Montagnais" by French people), Naskapi, and Inuit. The northernmost inhabited area of the district, Akpatok Island in Ungava Bay, was infamous for its widespread cannibalism, which ended around 1900 as the inhabitants moved to the mainland.

== Post-district history ==
In 1927, the long-standing dispute over the location of the boundary between Labrador and the former District of Ungava (by then part of Quebec) was taken to the arbitration of the British Judicial Committee of the Privy Council, which ruled in favour of Newfoundland. This means that Ungava's former continental territory is now split between Quebec and the modern-day province of Newfoundland and Labrador, with the Quebec portion falling within the administrative regions of Nord-du-Québec and Côte-Nord. The offshore islands of the former District of Ungava remained part of the Northwest Territories until the creation of Nunavut in 1999.

The name "Ungava" was revived as a political district with the creation of the provincial riding of Ungava in 1981. This Quebec riding has similar (though not exactly identical) boundaries with the original 1895 Ungava district—notably, it does not extend into Labrador, nor into the offshore islands that are now part of Nunavut.

== See also ==
- History of Canada
- Post-Confederation Canada (1867–1914)
- Canada in the World Wars and Interwar Years
