= Mouvement Québec français =

Mouvement Québec français (MQF) is an umbrella group of organisations in favour of the preservation and defence of the French language in Quebec, Canada.

== History ==
The MFQ was founded in the beginning of March 1971, when François-Albert Angers, president of the Saint-Jean-Baptiste Society of Montreal (SSJBM) and Matthias Rioux, president of the Alliance des professeurs de Montréal (APM) decided not to renew the action of the Front du Québec français, founded on October 25, 1969, but rather to start anew with a different organisation. The move was prompted by a dissatisfaction with the passing of the Act to promote the French language in Quebec by the National Assembly of Quebec. Angers would be president of the MQF from 1972 to 1980, Guy Bouthillier succeeding him afterwards.

On March 22, Angers submitted a convocation letter to 11 organisations:

- Conseil du Patronat du Québec (CPQ)
- Centrale de la Chambre de commerce du district de Montréal (CCdM)
- Centre des dirigeants d'entreprises (CDE)
- Confédération des syndicats nationaux (CSN)
- Corporation des enseignants du Québec (CEQ)
- Fédération des travailleurs du Québec (FTQ)
- Union des producteurs agricoles (UPA)
- Mouvement national des Québécois (MNQ)
- Alliance des professeurs de Montréal (APM)
- Saint-Jean-Baptiste Society of Montreal (SSJBM)
- Association québécoise des professeurs de français (AQPF)

The three organisations representing business milieus (CPQ, CCdM, CDE) withdrew participation early, leaving the eight others to take action alone to form the Mouvement Québec français. The movement was officially launched on November 29, 1971. It was decided that presidents or chief executives of the member organisations were going to be appointed as spokesperson in turn. The movement had four such spokespersons between 1971 and 1976: Albert Allain, Jacques-Yvan Morin, Fernand Daoust and François-Albert Angers.

The movement's initial objectives were to have the National Assembly proclaim French as the sole official language of Quebec and to have the Act to promote the French language in Quebec abrogated. It prepared two concise draft bills which it commented in a 13-page document entitled Notes explicatives sur les projets de lois présentés au premier ministre du Québec, published on January 18, 1972.

During the campaign for the Quebec general election of 1973, the movement became very active and took various actions aiming at the sensitisation of the public to the language question. It distributed 25,000 copies of a 96-page brochure entitled Je vote pour le Québec français, which was written by André Gaulin, Henri Laberge and François-Albert Angers.

In 1974, the National Assembly passed the Official Language Act (Bill 22). The MQF opposed the act, finding that it did not do enough to protect French.

== See also ==
- Quebec French
- Politics of Quebec
