= Solange =

Solange may refer to:

== People with the given name ==
- Solange Knowles (born 1986), American R&B/soul singer
- Solange of Bourges (d. 880), Christian saint
- Solange (psychic) (1952–2021), Italian TV personality, psychic and commentator
- Solange Alexandre (1922–2026), French World War II resistance fighter
- Solange Ancona (1943–2019), French composer
- Solange Ashby, American Egyptologist, Nubiologist and archaeologist
- Solange Azagury-Partridge (born 1961), London-based jewellery designer
- Solange Olame Bayibsa (born 1987), Tanzanian-born Swedish politician
- Solange Berry (born 1932), Belgian singer
- Solange Bertrand (1913–2011), French abstract painter, sculptor, and engraver
- Solange Chalvin (1932–2024), Canadian journalist and public servant
- Solange Chaput-Rolland (1919–2001), Canadian journalist, author, lecturer, politician, and senator
- Solange Charest (born 1950), Quebec (Canada) politician
- Solange d'Ayen (1898–1976), French noblewoman and journalist
- Solange d'Herbez de la Tour (born 1924), French architect
- Solange Fernex (1934–2006), French activist and politician
- Solange Gemayel (born 1949), Lebanese political figure, wife of President Bashir Gemayel
- Solange Ghernaouti (born 1958), Lebanese-Swiss professor and cybersecurity expert
- Solange Gomez (born 1988), Argentine actress and model
- Solange Lwashiga Furaha, human and women's rights activist from the Democratic Republic of the Congo
- Solange Mabignath (born 1958), Gabonese politician and administrator
- Solange Macamo, Mozambican archaeologist
- Solange Magalhães (born 1939), Brazilian painter
- Solange Magnano (1971–2009), Argentine beauty queen
- Solange Michel (1912–2010), French classical mezzo-soprano singer
- Solange Mindondo (1971–2019), Congolese actress and dancer
- Solange Pierre (1963–2011), known as Sonia Pierre, human rights advocate in the Dominican Republic
- Solange Rodriguez (born 1976), Ecuadorian professor and short-fiction writer
- Solange Sanfourche (1922–2013), alias Marie-Claude, French resistance fighter
- Solange Tagliavini (born 1985), Argentine team handball player
- Solange Troisier (1919–2008), French physician
- Solange Wilvert (born 1989), Brazilian model
- Solange Yijika, Cameroonian actress and film producer

== Other uses ==
- Solange, a novel by Willy Kyrklund
- Solange Dimitrios, character in the 2006 film Casino Royale
- Solange I, a 1970 case involving a conflict between EU and German national laws
  - Solange II, a 1986 case involving a conflict between EU and German national laws

== See also ==
- Sainte-Solange, commune in the Cher department in central France, named for the Christian saint
- Diana von Solange, opera by the German prince Ernst II of Saxe-Coburg-Gotha
- What Have You Done to Solange?, a 1972 Italian–West German giallo film directed by Massimo Dallamano
