= Prix Patriote de l'année =

The Prix Patriote de l'année (English:Patriot of the Year prize) is an honorary title created in 1975. It is awarded by the patriotic Saint-Jean-Baptiste Society to people "having distinguished [themselves] in the defense of the interests of Quebec and the democracy of peoples, in memory of the Patriotes of the 1830s."

== Laureates ==
- 1975: Madeleine Chaput and Marcel Chaput
- 1976: François-Albert Angers
- 1977: Camille Laurin
- 1978: Andrée Bertrand-Ferretti
- 1979: Raymond Barbeau
- 1980: Raymond Lévesque
- 1981: Jean Duceppe
- 1985: Jacques Parizeau
- 1986: Gaston Cholette
- 1987: Gilles Vigneault
- 1987: Fernand Roberge
- 1987: Jacques Henripin
- 1987: Pierre Harvey
- 1987: Rolland A. Pinsonneault
- 1987: Gérald LeBlanc
- 1987: Yvonne Hubert
- 1987: André Brassard
- 1987: Gérald Godin
- 1987: Claude Gosselin
- 1987: Gilles Proulx
- 1987: Lorraine Pagé
- 1988: Mia Riddez-Morisset
- 1989: Louis Laberge
- 1990: Serge Turgeon
- 1991: Jacques Proulx
- 1992: Carmen Sabag-Olmedo
- 1993: Jean-Claude Germain
- 1994: Paul Piché
- 1995: Monique Vézina
- 1996: Gérald Larose
- 1997: Yves Michaud
- 1998: Fernand Daoust and Jean-Marc Léger
- 2000: Jean-Marie Cossette
- 2001: Marcel Tessier
- 2002: Pierre Falardeau
- 2003: Georges Aubin and Renée Blanchet
- 2004: Luck Mervil
- 2005: Louise Laurin
- 2006: Bernard Landry
- 2007: Loco Locass (trio consisting of Sébastien Fréchette, Sébastien Ricard, Mathieu Farhoud-Dionne)
- 2008: Robert Laplante
- 2009: Hélène Pedneault
- 2010: Gilles Laporte
- 2011: Denis Trudel
- 2012: Fred Pellerin, Claudette Carbonneau, Jasmin Roy, Maria Mourani, Julie Snyder, Louis-José Houde and Dominic Champagne
- 2013: Frédéric Bastien
- 2014: Pierre Curzi
- 2015: Robin Philpot
- 2016: Jean-Paul Perreault
- 2017: Odette Sarrazin
- 2018: François Côté, Éric Poirier and Guillaume Rousseau
- 2019: Patrick R. Bourgeois
- 2020: Laurent Duvernay-Tardif
- 2021: Véronique Hivon

== See also ==
- Parti patriote
- Patriote Rebellion
- Quebec nationalism
