= List of presidents of the Saint-Jean-Baptiste Society of Montreal =

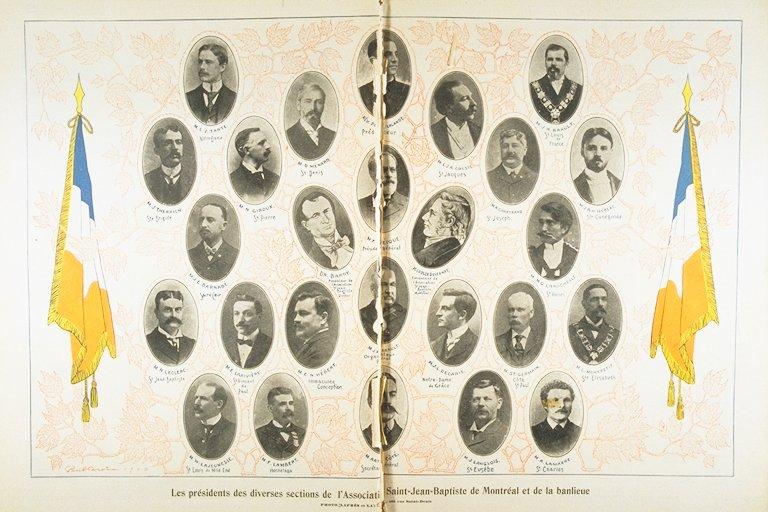
Presidents of the Association Saint-Jean-Baptiste in the 1903 edition of L'album universel.

This is a list of presidents of the Saint-Jean-Baptiste Society of Montreal.

== 19th century ==
=== First half ===
- 1834: Jacques Viger (1st)
- 1835: Honorable Denis-Benjamin Viger (2nd)
- 1845: Honorable Joseph Masson (3rd)
- 1846-47: Honorable Augustin-Norbert Morin (4th)
- 1848-49: Honorable Joseph Bourret (5th)

=== Second half ===
- 1850: Édouard-Raymond Fabre (6th)
- 1851-52: Ludger Duvernay (7th)
- 1852-53: Côme-Séraphin Cherrier, c.r. (8th)
- 1854-55: Sir George-Étienne Cartier (9th)
- 1856: Jacques Viger (1st)
- 1857: Dr. Jean-Baptiste Meilleur (10th)
- 1858: Damase Masson (11th)
- 1859: Dr. Pierre Beaubien (12th)
- 1860: Honourable Frédéric-Auguste Quesnel (13th)
- 1861: Romuald Trudeau (14th)
- 1862: Honourable Georges-René Saveuse de Beaujeu (15th)
- 1863: Honourable Antoine-Olivier Berthelet (16th)
- 1864: Louis-Tancrède Bouthillier (17th)
- 1865-66: Honourable Pierre-Jean-Olivier Chauveau (18th)
- 1867-68: Charles-André Leblanc, c.r. (19th)
- 1869-70: Honourable Gédéon Ouimet (20th)
- 1871: Honourable Charles-Séraphin Rodier (21st)
- 1872-74: Honourable Charles-Joseph Coursol (22nd)
- 1874: Sir Antoine-Aimé Dorion (23rd)
- 1875: Jacques Grenier (24th)
- 1876: Louis Archambeault (25th)
- 1877: Dr. Jean-Philippe Rottot (26th)
- 1879: Honourable Jean-Baptiste Rolland (27th)
- 1880: Honourable Thomas Jean-Jacques Loranger (28th)
- 1881: Napoléon Bourassa (29th)
- 1882: Honourable Louis Beaubien (30th)
- 1883: Jérémie Perrault (31st)
- 1884: Honourable Thomas Jean-Jacques Loranger (28th)
- 1885-86: Adolphe Ouimet (32nd)
- 1887: Dr. Emmanuel-Persillier Lachapelle (33rd)
- 1888-92: Honourable Laurent-Olivier David (34th)
- 1893-98: Honourable Louis-Onésime Loranger (35th)
- 1899-1904: Honourable François-Ligori Beique (36th)

== 20th century ==
=== First half ===
- 1905: Joseph-Xavier Perrault (37th)
- 1905-1907: Sir Hormidas Laporte (38th)
- 1908-1911: Joseph-Charles Beauchamp (39th)
- 1911-1913: Thomas Gauthier (40th)
- 1913-14: Olivar Asselin (41st)
- 1914-15: Charles Duquette (42nd)
- 1915-1924: Me Victor Morin (43rd)
- 1924-25: Joseph-Victor Desaulniers (44th)
- 1925: Guy Vanier (45th)
- 1925: Léon Trépanier (46th)
- 1929: Guy Vanier (45th)
- 1930: Aimé Parent (47th)
- 1931: Victor-Elzéar Beaupré (48th)
- 1932: Ernest Brossard (49th)
- 1933: Victor Doré (50th)
- 1934: Joseph-Alfred Bernier (51st)
- 1935: Ernest Laforce (52nd)
- 1937: Joseph Dansereau (53rd)
- 1939: Louis-Athanase Fréchette (54th)
- 1943: Roger Duhamel (55th)
- 1945: Charles-Auguste Changnon (56th)
- 1946: Arthur Tremblay (57th)

=== Second half ===
- 1950: Dr. J.-Alcide Martel (58th)
- 1951: J. Émile Boucher (59)
- 1954: François-Eugène Therrien (60th)
- 1957: Paul Guertin (61st)
- 1960: Jean Séguin (62nd)
- 1962: Paul-Émile Robert (63rd)
- 1965: Me Yvon Groulx (64th)
- 1968: Dollard Mathieu (65th)
- 1969: François-Albert Angers (66th)
- 1973: Me Yvon Groulx (64th)
- 1973: André Trudeau (67th)
- 1974: Yvan Sénécal (68th)
- 1975: Jean-Marie Cossette (69th)
- 1976: Jean-Charles Desroches (70th)
- 1977: André Beauchamp (71st)
- 1977: Jean-Paul Champagne (72nd)
- 1978: Jean-Marie Cossette (69th)
- 1980: Marcel Henry (73rd)
- 1981: Gilles Rhéaume (74th)
- 1985: Jean-Marie Cossette (69th)
- 1986: Nicole Boudreau (75th)
- 1989: Jean Dorion (76th)
- 1994: François Lemieux (77th)
- 1997: Guy Bouthillier (78th)

== 21st century ==
- 2003: Jean Dorion (76th bis)
- 2009: Mario Beaulieu (79th)
- 2014: Maxime Laporte (80th)
- 2020: Marie-Anne Alepin (81e)

== See also ==
- Saint-Jean-Baptiste Society
- Quebec nationalism
- Quebec sovereignty movement
