= Guy Bouthillier =

Canadian political expert

Guy Bouthillier (born in 1939) is a Canadian political expert, teacher and nationalist leader from Quebec. He was the president of the Saint-Jean-Baptiste Society of Montreal (SSJBM) from 1997 to 2003. He had become known previously as the head of the Mouvement Québec français, co-founded by a fellow SSJBM president, François-Albert Angers.

== Biography ==
After receiving a degree in law at McGill University in Montreal, he began teaching political science at the Université de Montréal. A French linguistic rights militant, he published on the subject Le choc des langues au Québec in 1972 and became the head of the activist group Mouvement Québec français in the 1980s. In 1989, he spoke at a demonstration of 60,000 people, one of the largest political gatherings in the history of Quebec, in reaction to challenges made to the Charter of the French Language at the Supreme Court of Canada (it judged it unconstitutional), as well as Bill 178, a law from the Robert Bourassa government that modified the reach of the charter.

He was elected president of the Saint-Jean-Baptiste Society of Montreal in 1997 and used his mandate to bring closer together the Quebec nationalist movement and cultural communities, most notably Jewish Quebecers. He was replaced as president by Jean Dorion in March 2003. His actions are partly responsible with the replacement in Quebec of Victoria Day (or Le Jour de Dollard) with National Patriot's Day by the Bernard Landry government.

== Bibliography ==
- Le choc des langues au Québec, 1760-1970 (1972)
- Georges-Émile Lapalme (1988)
- A armes égales: Combat pour le Québec français (1994)
- L'obsession ethnique (1997)

== Quote ==
- "We want only Bill 101, but all of Bill 101."
  - Demonstration of 1989 in favour of Bill 101

== See also ==
- List of presidents of the Saint-Jean-Baptiste Society of Montreal
- Quebec nationalism
- Quebec sovereignty movement
- Legal dispute over Quebec's language policy
- Politics of Quebec
