= Partenaires pour la souveraineté =

Former Quebec sovereigntist organization

Partenaires pour la souveraineté (English: Partners of Sovereignty) was a Quebec sovereigntist organization that existed in the mid-to-late 1990s. It was an umbrella group of several high-profile organizations, including Quebec labour unions and other pre-existing sovereigntist groups.

Partenaires pour la souveraineté was launched in January 1995 as a coalition of fifteen organizations, including the Confédération des syndicats nationaux, the Quebec Federation of Labour, the Mouvement national des Québécois, the Centrale de l'enseignement du Québec, Les Intellectuels pour la souveraineté, and the Saint-Jean-Baptiste Society. One of the coalition's first activities was to facilitate the printing of several popular pamphlets, promoting what its leaders regarded as the benefits of Quebec sovereignty in relation to the economy, social policy, culture, education, international relations, citizenship issues, and personal liberties.

Partenaires pour la souveraineté's leader was Nicole Boudreau, a former leader of the Saint-Jean-Baptiste Society in Montreal. During the 1995 Quebec referendum on sovereignty, Boudreau undertook a tour to encourage women to support the sovereigntist option. The coalition also launched a $150,000 radio advertisement campaign in the middle of the referendum campaign to support the sovereigntist "Oui" option. Ultimately, the sovereigntist option was narrowly defeated.

Partenaires pour la souveraineté began publishing a journal, the Partenaires Express, in 1996. The 1997, the coalition led a campaign to increase public support for Quebec's Charter of the French Language.

The Centrale de l'enseignement du Québec, representing Quebec teachers, withdrew from the coalition in February 1998. While reiterating their support for Quebec independence, the union's leaders said they were withdrawing to protest spending cuts introduced by the sovereigntist Parti Québécois government, with which the coalition was closely aligned. The Confédération des syndicats nationaux also withdrew from the coalition later in the same year to protest the PQ's "pro-business" bias. Partenaires pour la souveraineté seems to have become dormant after this time.
