= Michel Bergeron (disambiguation) =

Michel Bergeron (born 1946) is a retired Canadian ice hockey coach and current on-air personality.

Michel Bergeron may also refer to:

- Michel Bergeron (ice hockey, born 1954), retired Canadian ice hockey player
- Michel Bergeron (scientist), awardee of 2001 Prix Georges-Émile-Lapalme
