= Legal dispute over Quebec's language policy =

The legal dispute over Quebec's language policy began soon after the enactment of Bill 101, establishing the Charter of the French Language, by the Parliament of Quebec in 1977.

The Charter, enacted under the Parti Québécois government of René Lévesque, expanded upon Quebec's previous language legislation, Bill 22, also known as the Official Language Act, enacted in 1974 under the Liberal Party of Quebec government of Robert Bourassa. Earlier language legislation in Quebec had included An Act to promote the French language in Quebec in 1969, and the La Vergne Law of 1910.

Both statutes were drafted in an attempt to follow the recommendations of the Commission of Inquiry on the Situation of the French Language and Linguistic Rights in Quebec (the Gendron Commission).

Unlike the (Quebec) Official Language Act of 1974 (not to be confused with the federal Official Languages Act), the Charter of the French Language is a legal framework defining the linguistic rights of Quebecers, and a language management policy giving the Government of Quebec the power to intervene in many sectors of public life to promote French as the common language of all citizens. Its enactment sparked a legal battle that still goes on today.

== Before 1982 ==
In 1867, the British Parliament passed the British North America Act 1867, now known as the Constitution Act, 1867, which became the supreme law of the Dominion of Canada (although it was modified several times, it is still part of the Constitution of Canada). This act contains only one section (section 133) dealing with language. It reads:

"Either the English or the French Language may be used by any Person in the Debates of the Houses of the Parliament of Canada and of the Houses of the Legislature of Quebec; and both those Languages shall be used in the respective Records and Journals of those Houses; and either of those Languages may be used by any Person or in any Pleading or Process in or issuing from any Court of Canada established under this Act, and in or from all or any of the Courts of Quebec."

"The Acts of the Parliament of Canada and of the Legislature of Quebec shall be printed and published in both those Languages."

=== Language of legislation and justice ===
Three Quebec Lawyers, Peter Blaikie, Roland Durand and Yoine Goldstein first challenged the constitutionality of the Charter of the French Language under section 133.

In 1979, the Supreme Court of Canada declared Chapter III of the Charter of the French Language unconstitutional, citing it contrary to section 133 of the British North America Act 1867. The highest court in Canada judged that the enacting and passing of laws had to be done in both French and English in the parliaments of Quebec and Canada.

Sections 7 to 13 of the Charter of the French Language had made French the only language of legislation and only provided for a translation of laws in English at the end of the legislative process.

The Quebec government responded by re-enacting the charter (and all other acts enacted since 1977) in French and English. Sections 7 to 13 of the charter were however left untouched.

In 1981, another Supreme Court decision (Quebec (Attorney General) v. Blaikie (No. 2)) declared that section 133 also applied to government regulations.

== After 1982 ==
The patriation of the Canadian Constitution occurred as the British Parliament passed the Canada Act 1982. This act enacted the Constitution Act, 1982 for Canada (including the Canadian Charter of Rights and Freedoms), which has two provisions which have provided the basis for further constitutional disputes concerning Quebec's Charter of the French Language. Section 2 of the Charter guarantees freedom of expression, which opens the door to challenges to laws which restrict an individual's ability to use a particular language, while section 23 introduced the notion of "minority language education rights".

Alliance Quebec, an Anglophone rights lobby group was founded in May 1982. It is through this civil association that various anglophone lawyers challenged the constitutionality of Quebec's territorial language policy.

=== Language of instruction ===
==== Quebec (A.G.) v. Quebec Protestant School Boards ====
In 1984, the Supreme Court invalidated Chapter VIII of the Quebec Charter of the French Language on the basis of its incompatibility with section 23 of the Canadian Charter of Rights and Freedoms. Section 23 of the Canadian Charter reads:

1. Citizens of Canada
  1. whose first language learned and still understood is that of the English or French linguistic minority population of the province in which they reside, or
  2. who have received their primary school instruction in Canada in English or French and reside in a province where the language in which they received that instruction is the language of the English or French linguistic minority population of the province,
  have the right to have their children receive primary and secondary school instruction in that language in that province.

Section 73 of the Charter of the French language had recognized the right to English language instruction to Quebec residents alone. Canadian citizens from outside Quebec are forced to send their children to French primary and secondary schools, in direct violation of S26.(3) of the UN Declaration of Human Rights, which states that "Parents have a prior right to choose the kind of education that shall be given to their children.

On July 26, 1984, the Supreme Court invalidated part of Section 73. Judged retroactively unconstitutional, the section had to be modified so that it no longer clashes with the Canadian charter's definition of a linguistic minority. The current Section 73 of the Charter of the French language reads:

The following children, at the request of one of their parents, may receive instruction in English:

1. a child whose father or mother is a Canadian citizen and received elementary instruction in English in Canada, provided that that instruction constitutes the major part of the elementary instruction he or she received in Canada;
2. a child whose father or mother is a Canadian citizen and who has received or is receiving elementary or secondary instruction in English in Canada, and the brothers and sisters of that child, provided that that instruction constitutes the major part of the elementary or secondary instruction received by the child in Canada;
3. a child whose father and mother are not Canadian citizens, but whose father or mother received elementary instruction in English in Québec, provided that that instruction constitutes the major part of the elementary instruction he or she received in Québec;
4. a child who, in their last year in school in Québec before 26 August 1977, was receiving instruction in English in a public kindergarten class or in an elementary or secondary school, and the brothers and sisters of that child;
5. a child whose father or mother was residing in Québec on 26 August 1977 and had received elementary instruction in English outside Québec, provided that that instruction constitutes the major part of the elementary instruction he or she received outside Québec.

In 2005, a Supreme Court ruling upheld Section 73 of the Charter of the French language and its corresponding subsections (1 through 5). See Maclean's 5 April 2005, an article by John Geddes entitled "Tweaking the Language Laws". It maintains that the court upheld S.73 yet provided for flexibility in matters dealing with English-speaking Canadians and immigrants from other countries.

==== Bill 104 ====
In August 2007, the Quebec Court of Appeal ruled that a section of the province's language legislation is unlawful. The judgment stated that Bill 104, an amendment to the Charter passed in 2002 that stopped children of francophone and newcomers from using the English educational system, was contrary to the Charter of Rights and Freedoms. The amendment was passed to thwart entry to English schools by pupils who had gone to at least one year of an unsubsidized private institution. It had been passed unanimously (by all parties) in the provincial legislature.

The Appeal Court verdict disallowed a segment of Bill 104, suggesting that students can attend English public schools if they have been at an English private schools for a minimum of one year or have been permitted a special exemption. The Quebec government immediately announced it would appeal the decision to the Supreme Court of Canada, which it did.

A judgment was given that delayed use of that conclusion until the Supreme Court of Canada judged on a provincial administration request.

The challenge to Bill 104 continued but with funding from the English school boards affected, as the federal Court Challenges Program established for such minority language rights was cut by the Conservative minority government. There was a precedent for having the government pay the fees of the challenging side, or appointing an amicus curiae.

A representative of the Quebec Association of Independent Schools proclaimed its goal to strike the delay, and Brent Tyler, the advocate for the 26 families in the case, said he would pull together an appeal.

The Quebec English School Board Association (QESBA) suspected the volume of probable English-system learners who might be affected by this result to be 500 annually, the majority of whom would enroll in Montreal schools. It said such a loss to the French school enrollment of almost 1 million would be unimportant. It asked that the decision be respected until it can be referred to the Supreme Court.

About half of all enrollment decline in the English Montreal School Board since 2002 has resulted from Bill 104, a low fertility rate and urban sprawl being other reasons, said a spokesman in 2007.

A coalition of groups for defending French supported the Quebec government in its venture to overturn the Quebec Appeal Court ruling. Former CSN leader Gérald Larose, chairman of the Conseil de la souveraineté, commented negatively on this "undermining" of the Charter of the French Language by an "English judge" (the decision was handed down by the Quebec Court of Appeals, which is not an English body). Larose was also the Parti Québécois–appointed president of a commission on the future of the French language and advocated that Quebec be granted unshared supremacy over language legislation, despite the Canadian constitution which divides such power between the national and provincial governments. Jean Dorion, president of the Société Saint-Jean-Baptiste de Montréal, said that Appeals Court judges are appointed by the national government and said that they should not have the power to overrule Quebec's language laws. Other commentators remonstrated that Justice Hilton had previously served as legal counsel for Alliance Quebec, an anglophone rights group. Le Devoir reported, however, that the Quebec department of justice did not ask Hilton to recuse himself from the case. Through a spokesperson, the Ministry of Justice said that such a recusal was not necessary and that the government trusted the Court of Appeal to be fair. Parti Québécois leader Pauline Marois suggested in 2007 that the ruling could be "catastrophic" and described it as unsatisfactory. Over the 30-year life of Bill 101 "about 4,000 children have used this to get into the English network," she said, as opposed to the French network.

=== Language of commercial signs ===
==== Ford v. Quebec (Attorney General) ====
In 1988, the Supreme Court ruled that the sections of the Charter of the French Language enforcing the exclusive use of French on outdoor commercial signs were unconstitutional. The Court-based this decision on the guarantee of freedom of expression in s. 2 of the Canadian Charter of Rights and Freedoms.

The Supreme Court remarked that the Quebec government could legitimately require French to have "greater visibility" or "marked predominance" on exterior commercial signs, however it could not enforce the exclusive use of French.

With the Act to amend the Charter of the French language, S.Q. 1988, c. 54 (also known as Bill 178), the National Assembly (under a Quebec Liberal government) made use of the notwithstanding clause of the Canadian constitution and amended the Charter by allowing English provided that the letters are no larger than half the size of the French.

==== Ballantyne, Davidson, McIntyre v. Canada ====
The use of the notwithstanding clause led to formal complaints by three Quebecers: John Ballantyne, Elizabeth Davidson, and Gordon McIntyre, who own businesses in Sutton, Quebec and Huntingdon, Quebec. In 1993, they brought their case before the Human Rights Committee of the United Nations.

They challenged sections 1, 6 and 10 of Bill No. 178 enacted by the Quebec legislature on 22 December 1988. They alleged to be victims of violations of articles 2, 19, 26 and 27 of the International Covenant on Civil and Political Rights by the federal government of Canada and by the Province of Quebec, due to the act's prohibitions on the use English in advertising or in the name of their firms.

After hearing both parties, the Committee gave its opinion on what it believed to be the three major issues:

- (a) whether Sec.58 of the Charter of the French Language, as amended by Bill 178, Sec.1, violates any right that the authors might have by virtue of article 27;
- (b) whether Sec.58 of the Charter of the French Language, as amended by Bill 178, Sec.1, violates the authors' right to freedom of expression;
- (c) whether the same provision is compatible with the authors' right to equality before the law.
- 1. The Committee observed that "provisions of article 27 refers to minorities in States", which English-speaking people in Canada are not. It stated that the "authors therefore have no claim under article 27 of the Covenant".
- 2. The Committee disagreed with the Government of Quebec which asserted "that commercial activities such as outdoor advertising do not fall within the ambit of article 19." The Committee stated "Article 19, paragraph 2, must be interpreted as encompassing every form of subjective ideas and opinions capable of transmission to others, which are compatible with article 20 of the Covenant, of news and information, of commercial expression and advertising, of works of art, etc.; it should not be confined to means of political, cultural or artistic expression." The Committee believed that "it [was] not necessary, in order to protect the vulnerable position in Canada of the francophone group, to prohibit commercial advertising in English." It suggested that "This protection may be achieved in other ways that do not preclude the freedom of expression, in a language of their choice, of those engaged in such fields as trade. For example, the law could have required that advertising be in both French and English." It concluded that "A State may choose one or more official languages, but it may not exclude, outside the spheres of public life, the freedom to express oneself in a language of one's choice. The Committee accordingly concludes that there has been a violation of article 19, paragraph 2."
- 3. Regarding the right to equality, the Committee found that "the authors have not been discriminated against on the ground of their language, and concludes that there has been no violation of article 26 of the Covenant."

There were 5 concurring and dissenting opinions, signed by eight Committee members.

==== Internet ====
The Court of Quebec rendered a number of decisions regarding the applicability of the Charter to advertising over the Internet. The court found that commercial websites of businesses that operate from Quebec and sell to Quebec need to conform to the provisions of the Charter regarding the rights of Quebecers to receive services in French. In A.G. of Quebec (Procureur Général) c. Stanley John Reid et Frances Muriel Reid (JE 2002-1266), the defendant raised the argument that the content of Internet is of exclusive federal jurisdiction pursuant to the Constitution Act, 1867, and thus its regulation is ultra vires of the Quebec Government. The court confirmed the applicability of the Charter on advertising over the Internet.

=== Compliance ===
With the Act to amend the Charter of the French language, S.Q. 1993, c. 40 (also known as Bill 86), the National Assembly (under a Quebec Liberal government) amended the Charter of the French Language to make it comply with the Supreme Court rulings. The amending law introduced the "Canada Clause" which replaced the "Quebec Clause". That is, the recognized right to English language education was extended to all Canadian citizens. It also introduced the current regulations on the "marked predominance" of French on outdoor commercial signs in conformity with the Supreme Court suggestion.

As suggested by the Supreme Court ruling, the current law specifies that commercial outdoor signs can be multilingual so long as French is markedly predominant. The current provisions regarding exterior commercial signs were confirmed as constitutional by the Quebec Court of Appeal in R. c. Entreprises W.F.H. [2001] R.J.Q. 2557 (C.A.) (also known as "The Lyon & the Walrus Case"). Today, many businesses choose to put up French-only signs, and at times, even change their registered trademarks to adapt to the Quebec market. Nevertheless, English–French bilingualism quickly returned on exterior signs after 1993, especially on the island of Montreal.

== See also ==
- Anglophone problem (Cameroon)
- Language planning
- Language policy
