= Nicole Boudreau (Quebec administrator) =

Quebec sovereignty activist

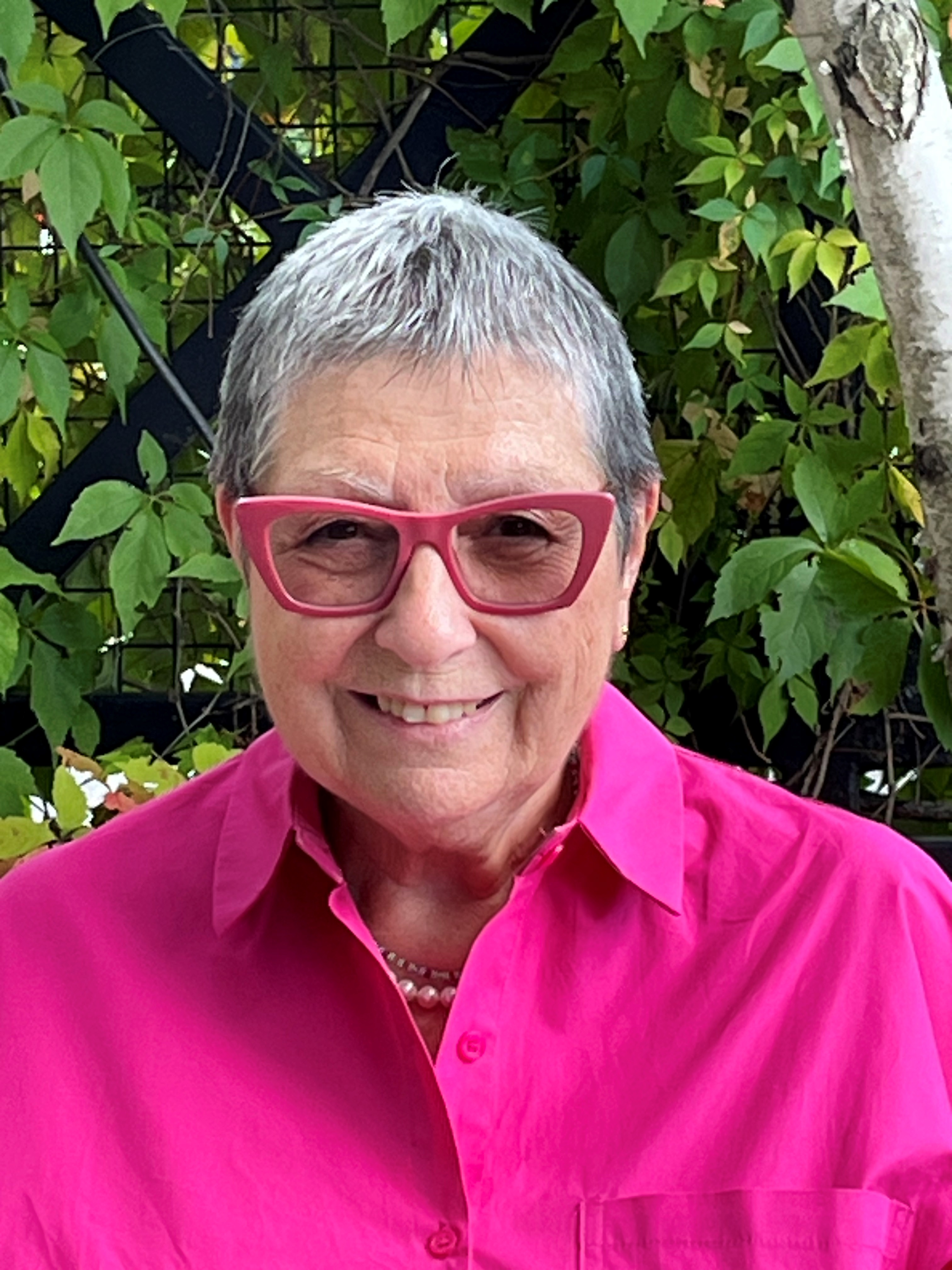

President of the Saint-Jean-Baptiste Society in Montreal
- In office 1986–1989
- Preceded by: Jean-Marie Cossette
- Succeeded by: Jean Dorion

Nicole Boudreau (born September 14, 1949) is a Canadian administrator, activist, and politician in Montreal, Quebec. Closely associated with the Quebec sovereigntist movement, she led the Saint-Jean-Baptiste Society in Montreal from 1986 to 1989 and oversaw the group Partenaires pour la souveraineté (Partners of Sovereignty) in the 1990s.

Boudreau has also sought election at the municipal level in Montreal. She is not to be confused with a different Nicole Boudreau who served on the Montreal city council from 1986 to 1994.

== Early life and education ==
Boudreau was born to a working-class family in Noranda, Quebec. She studied art at the Université de Paris and later earned a philosophy degree from the Université du Québec en Abitibi-Témiscamingue. In 2002, she returned to Paris to complete a master's degree in tourism planning and management.

== Quebec sovereigntist ==
=== Fête nationale ===
Boudreau was an organizer for Quebec's Fête nationale in the 1980s. In 1986, she indicated that the festival would forgo traditional folkloric themes and instead spotlight the growing presence of francophone Quebecers as entrepreneurs.

=== Saint-Jean-Baptiste Society ===
Boudreau joined the Saint-Jean-Baptiste Society in 1980 and became president of its Montreal division in 1986. She was the first woman to be chosen as the Saint-Jean-Baptiste Society's leader and remarked that her presidency was not simply a victory for women but for the society as a whole, marking a break with its more conservative past.

Shortly after becoming president, Boudreau accused Quebec premier Robert Bourassa's government of flouting certain provisions of Quebec's Charter of the French Language (which, among other things, restricts the public display of signs in languages other than French). She took particular issue with justice minister Herbert Marx's statement that shopkeepers would only be prosecuted for violating Quebec's sign laws if they displayed unilingual non-French signs for their establishments. Boudreau noted that the charter also forbade bilingual signs, and called for the government to prohibit such signs on the grounds that they posed a threat to Quebec's francophone identity. She was quoted as saying, "As far as we're concerned, bilingual signs mean to the new Quebecer that there are two languages here and he can choose which one he wants to speak. To the anglophone they mean the person doesn't have to bother learning French because everything here is translated." In December 1986, she organized a rally at the Paul Sauvé Arena in support of retaining and strengthening Quebec's language laws.

In mid-1988, Boudreau was a lead organizer for a protest march against any weakening of Quebec's language laws. Twenty-five thousand people attended the event, a much higher number than expected. Boudreau subsequently opposed the Bourassa government's compromise language legislation, which permitted stores to have indoor bilingual signs while requiring all external signs to be in French; her position was that this provision would satisfy no one and "greatly threaten social peace and the francization of Quebec."

When the Supreme Court of Canada struck down Quebec's French-only sign laws in December 1988, Boudreau urged Bourassa to hold a referendum that would permit Quebec to repatriate full legislative powers on language issues from the government of Canada. Bourassa instead overturned the court's decision by invoking Section Thirty-three of the Canadian Charter of Rights and Freedoms (i.e., the "Notwithstanding Clause").

Boudreau was considered a moderate within the Saint-Jean-Baptiste Society and was known for seeking dialogue rather than confrontation with anglophone organizations. She condemned an arson attack against the headquarters of Alliance Quebec in January 1989 and took part in a radio discussion with its leader, Peter Blaikie, not long thereafter. In March 1989, as Boudreau's term as president came to an end, the society narrowly voted to continue its ongoing dialogue with the anglophone organization.

Boudreau urged French Quebecers to welcome new immigrants and help them become integrated with the province's francophone majority. In March 1987, she launched a program to help recent immigrants from Latin America and Turkey better engage with the francophone community. In January 1990, she offered her support to a group of hunger-striking refugee claimants from Latin America.

In 1990, Boudreau organized a Saint-Jean-Baptiste Day parade for Fête nationale that was estimated to have attracted between 150,000 and 200,000 people. She actively encouraged the participation of anglophones and thanked those who attended.

=== Partenaires pour la Souveraineté ===
During the mid-1990s, Boudreau was a prominent spokesperson for Partenaires pour la souveraineté (Partners of Sovereignty), an umbrella organization of several high-profile unions and nationalist groups. She was also a prominent campaigner for the "Oui" option in the 1995 Quebec referendum on sovereignty and led an outreach effort specifically focused on promoting sovereignty among Québécois women. Ultimately, the sovereigntist option was narrowly defeated.

Boudreau launched a campaign in 1997 to re-inspire public support for Quebec's Charter of the French Language. She was quoted as saying, "We constantly hear that (Bill 101) is abnormal, illegal, illegitimate, and all that has sapped the confidence of Quebecers in the legal tool they have given themselves."

== Municipal administrator ==
Boudreau helped organize Montreal's 350th anniversary celebrations in 1992. She later worked for Jacqueline Montpetit, the borough mayor of Montreal's Sud-Ouest region, from 2006 to 2009.

Boudreau ran to succeed Montpetit in the 2009 municipal election as a candidate of Gérald Tremblay's Union Montreal party. She was narrowly defeated by Benoit Dorais of Vision Montreal.

== Electoral record ==
2009 Montreal municipal election: Borough Mayor, Le Sud-Ouest
Party	Candidate	Votes	%
Vision Montreal	Benoit Dorais	4,848	28.41
Union Montreal	Nicole Boudreau	4,821	28.25
Independent	Line Hamel	3,586	21.01
Projet Montréal	Mudi Wa Mbuji Kabeya	3,275	19.19
Independent	Camillien Delisle	537	3.15
Total valid votes		17,067	100
Source: Election results, 2009, City of Montreal.
