= Andrée Ferretti =

Canadian political figure and author (1935–2022)

- Born: 6 February 1935; Montreal, Canada
- Died: September 29, 2022 (aged 87); Montreal, Canada

Andrée Ferretti (1935-September 29, 2022) was a Canadian political figure and author. She was the vice president of the Rassemblement pour l'indépendance nationale (RIN), a Quebec independence movement and later political party of the 1960s. Ferretti was one of the early militants of the contemporary Quebec independence movement.

== Biography ==
Ferretti was born in Montreal in a family of humble wealth. She began her commitment for Quebec independence in 1958. She was a member of the Mouvement de Libération Populaire, and when it disbanded joined the Rassemblement pour l'indépendance nationale and became its vice-president. The RIN had distinct left and right wing sections and Ferretti part of the left wing of the party, arguing that the whole socio-economic system needed to be reformed. Ferretti argued that Quebec was "in a mortal struggle against all who contribute to our exploitation, whether they be American Imperialists, Canadian capitalists or the French-Canadian bourgeoisie." After a confrontation with then-president of the RIN Pierre Bourgault, she resigned from the party and founded the short-lived Front de libération populaire (FLP) in March 1968. Bourgault asked his followers to join René Lévesque's then-fledgling Parti Québécois using entryism, thus uniting the indépendantiste forces.

During the 1970s, she published a number of writings in favour of independence within Le Devoir and Parti pris, while studying philosophy. In 1979, the Saint-Jean-Baptiste Society made her Patriot of the Year. She directed, with Gaston Miron, a compilation of writings for independence, from the Patriotes to modern Sovereigntism, ending in 1992. After Miron's passing, she directed the second volume regarding the time between 1992 and 2003. She also published three novels at the VLB éditeur and Typo publishing houses.

She died in Montreal, 29 September 2022.

== Bibliography ==
- Renaissance en Paganie (1987)
- La Vie partisane (1990)
- L'été de la compassion (2003)
- Les grands textes indépendantistes: 1774 à 1992
- Les grands textes indépendantistes: 1992 à 2003

== See also ==
- Quebec sovereignty movement
- Quebec nationalism
- Politics of Quebec
- Ferretti
