= Les Intellectuels pour la souveraineté =

Organization in Quebec

- Abbreviation: IPSO
- Formation: June 21, 1995
- Type: Non-profit corporation
- Legal status: active
- Purpose: advocate and public voice, educator and network
- Headquarters: Montreal, Quebec
- Region served: Quebec
- Official language: French
- President: Gilbert Paquette
- Website: http://www.ipsoquebec.org

Les Intellectuels pour la souveraineté (in English: Intellectuals for Sovereignty), or IPSO, is a group of intellectuals studying and promoting Quebec independence.

It was created on June 21, 1995 by the publication of their manifesto, four months before the second referendum on Quebec sovereignty took place. Among its founding members were politician and constitutional law professor Daniel Turp, Michel Seymour, Jacques-Yvan Morin, Kai Nielsen and others.

IPSO promotes Quebec sovereignty through the publication of works, organization of events (debates, conferences, protests) and participation in political activities. It was part of the Partenaires pour la souveraineté coalition.

== Presidents ==
The IPSO presidency is renewed every year. Since the association was founded, many public intellectuals from Quebec's academic community have assumed this responsibility:

Name	Term
Michel Seymour	1995-1999
Jocelyne Couture	1999-2001
Pierre Noreau	2001-2003
Ercilia Palacio-Quintin	2003-2006
Anne Legaré	2006
Marylise Lapierre	2006-2008
Gilbert Paquette	2008-2012
Pierre Paquette	2013-2014
Gérald McNichols	2014-2015
Pierre Serré	2015-2018
Jean-François Payette	2018-2021
Florent Michelot	2021-

== See also ==
- Quebec sovereignty movement
- Quebec nationalism
- Quebec politics
- List of active autonomist and secessionist movements
