= MQF =

MQF can mean:

- Malaysian Qualifications Framework, a system for post-secondary education qualifications in Malaysia
- Master of Quantitative Finance, a master's degree in quantitative finance
- Mouvement Québec français, a civic organization in Canada
- Mobile Quarantine Facility, where astronauts spent two weeks after visiting the moon for Apollo 11, Apollo 12, and Apollo 14
