= Jacques Duval =

Canadian journalist, writer, and racing driver (1934–2024)

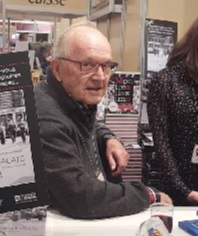
- Duval in 2016
- Born: Joseph Gaston Jacques Duval; 21 June 1934; Lauzon, Quebec, Canada
- Died: 6 February 2024 (aged 89)
- Occupations: Journalist; Writer; Racing driver

Joseph Gaston Jacques Duval (21 June 1934 – 6 February 2024) was a Canadian journalist, writer and racing driver.

In 1952, he became an announcer for the radio station CKCV in Quebec City and CINF in Montreal. He founded the annual almanac Le Guide de l'auto, of which he served as editor-in-chief from 1967 to 2003.

== Biography ==
Born in Lauzon on 21 June 1934, Duval was the son of insurance agent Omer Duval and Gabrielle Baribeau. He took an interest in automobiles at the end of the 1950s and won the inaugural Grand Prix de Trois-Rivières in 1967. In the 1960s, he hosted the television show Le Cimetière du Disque on Télé-Métropole. During this time, he also hosted the show Prenez le volant on Ici Radio-Canada Télé. In 1967, he founded Le Guide de l'auto. In 1974, an English publisher attempted to purchase the rights to the almanac, but was refused. He temporarily stepped back from 1987 to 1993 to turn to journalism, but returned as a collaborator.

Duval was the first Canadian to participate in the 24 Hours of Daytona in 1971. He wrote columns in La Presse and hosted shows on Radio-Canada, TVA, Canal Vox, and Canal Évasion. In the 1990s, he became an advisor for Ford, which faced backlash and accusations that he would no longer be able to remain neutral in Le Guide de l'auto. He resigned after a few years.

In 1998, Duval became a spokesperson for the car recycling program Auto-Rein, associated with the Kidney Foundation of Canada. In 2003, he sold his company, expressing his desire to longer manage a business. In 2004, he was fired from his position as editor-in-chief due to a dispute with his purchaser, LC Média, Inc., which wanted to transform his brand into a publishing house. In 2007, he published his autobiography, titled Jacques Duval, de Gilbert Bécaud à Enzo Ferrari, with Éditions Québec Amérique. In 2008, he returned to Le Guide de l'auto after a five-year hiatus. In 2013, LC Média, Inc. announced Duval's return as a collaborator for the 2014 edition.

Jacques Duval died on 6 February 2024, at the age of 89.

== Works ==
- Le Guide de l'auto (1966)
- Le Guide de l'auto 68 (1967)
- Le Guide de l'auto 69 (1968)
- Le Guide de l'auto 70 (1969)
- Le Guide de l'auto 71 (1970)
- Le Guide de l'auto 72 (1971)
- Le Guide de l'auto 73 (1972)
- Le Guide de l'auto 74 (1973)
- Le Guide de l'auto 75 (1974)
- Le Guide de l'auto 76 (1975)
- Le Guide de l'auto 77 (1976)
- Le Guide de l'auto 78 (1977)
- Le Guide des 4X4 Fourgonnettes (Vans) et Pick Up 78 (1977)
- Le Guide de l'auto 79 (1978)
- Le Guide de l'auto 80 (1979)
- Le Guide de l'auto 81 (1980)
- Le Guide de l'auto 82 (1981)
- Le Guide de l'auto 83 (1982)
- Le Guide de l'auto 84 (1983)
- Le Guide de l'auto 85 (1984)
- Le Guide de l'auto 86 (1985)
- Le Guide de l'auto 91 (1990)
- Le Guide de l'auto 93 (1992)
- Le Guide de l'auto 94 (1993)
- Le Guide de l'auto 95, Festival Ferrari à Fiorano (1994)
- Le Guide de l'auto 96, Festival Ferrari à Fiorano (1995)
- Le Guide de l'auto 97, La Fièvre des Roadsters (1996)
- Le Guide de l'auto 98, Un amour de Coccinelle II (1997)
- Le Guide de l'auto 99 (1998)
- Le Guide de l'auto 2000 (1999)
- Le Guide de l'auto 2001 (2000)
- Le Guide de l'auto 2002 (2001)
- Le Guide de l'auto 2003 (2004)
- AUTObiographie (2007)
- L'Auto 2009 (2008)
- L'Auto 2010 (2009)
- L'Auto 2011 (2010)
- L'Auto 2012 (2011)
- L'Auto 2013 (2012)
- Le Guide de l'auto 2014 (2013)
- Le Guide de l'auto 2015 (2014)
- Le Guide de l'auto 2016 (2015)
- The Guide to Electric, Hybrid & Fuel-Efficient Cars: 70 vehicles reviewed, plus everything you need to know about going electric (2016)

== Honors ==
- Mérite du français from the Office québécois de la langue française (2004)
- Inducted into the Canadian Motorsport Hall of Fame (2010)
- Prix Georges-Émile-Lapalme
