= Hélène Pedneault =

Canadian writer (1952–2008)

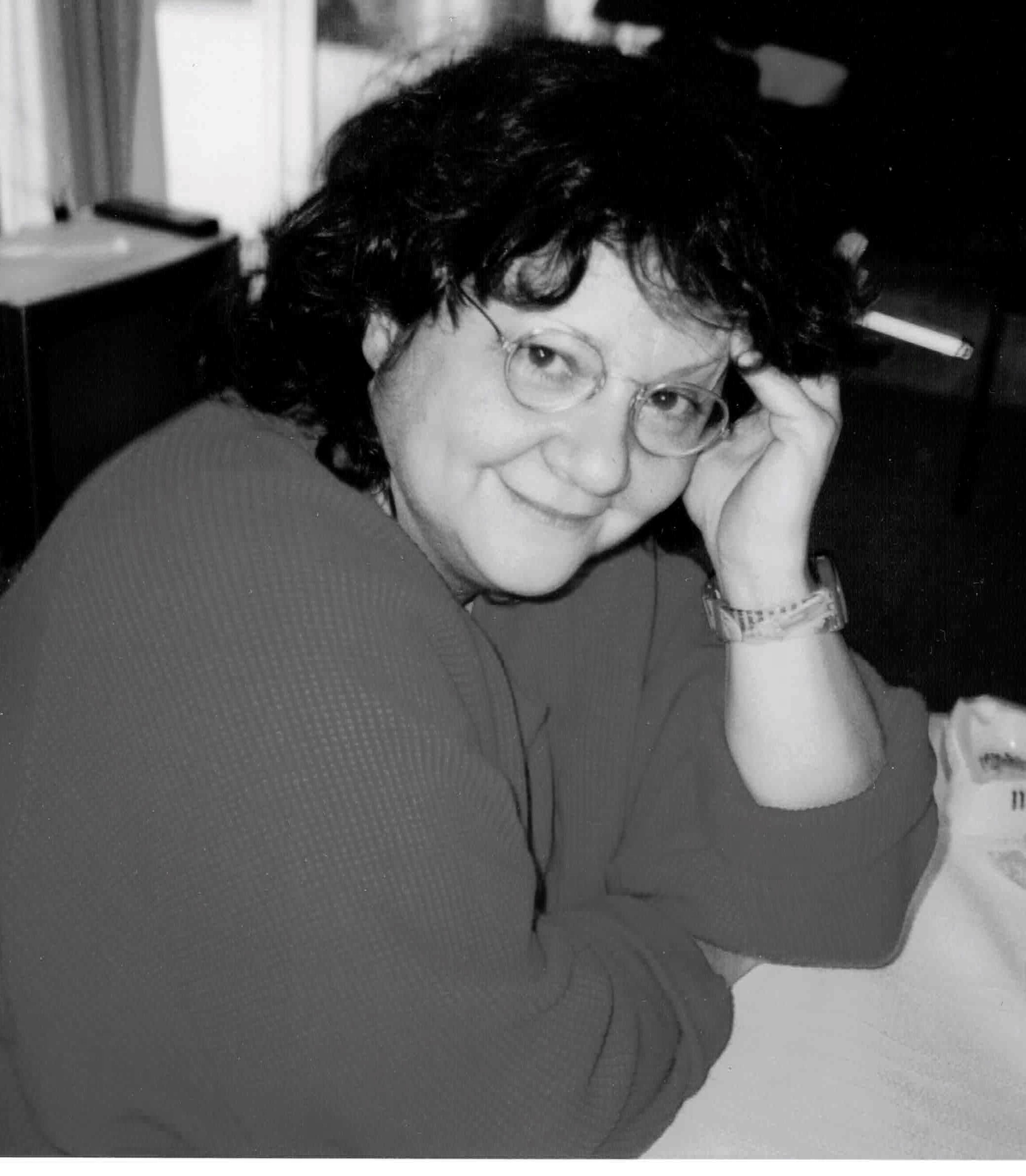
- Born: 14 April 1952; Jonquière, Quebec, Canada
- Died: 1 December 2008 (aged 56); Montreal, Quebec, Canada
- Citizenship: Canadian
- Education: Cégep de Jonquière
- Occupations: Writer; journalist; feminist

Hélène Pedneault (14 April 1952 – 1 December 2008) was a Québécoise writer of many mediums who contributed much to the advancement of the feminist cause and also to Quebec sovereignty and the environment.

== Biography ==
Hélène Pedneault studied literature at the Cégep de Jonquière and had a career in many forms of writing. She wrote a dramatic play, La déposition, published in 1988, which has been translated into five languages and staged in New York, Paris, Amsterdam, London and Rome. She documented the history of the women's movement in Quebec in the series "Chronique Délinquante" in the feminist activist magazine La Vie en rose. This chronicled the news from a women's perspective and denounced abuses of power, both private and public. These writings were published in a collected volume after the magazine ceased operations. Pedneault wrote many pieces for Elle (Quebec), Focus, Dérives, Les cahiers de la femme, Possibles, JEU, Guide ressources, Ciel Variable, Le Sabord and Arcade, and also wrote teleplays, essays and songs.

She won the 1992 Prix Edgar-Lespérance for her book La Douleur du volcan, the 2000 Prix littéraires du Salon du livre du Saguenay-Lac-Saint-Jean and the 2004 Prix Abitibi-Consolidated for her works. Pedneault wrote the lyrics of the song "Du pain et des roses" (Bread and roses) during the first Marche mondiale des Femmes organized in Quebec in 1995. Pedneault created the radio plays Signé Loranger (1995), Éloge de l'indignation (1996) and Robert Gravel, l'homme qui avait toujours soif (1997), and the television series Sous le signe du Lion (1997) for Radio-Canada.

Pedneault became involved in Quebec separatism and authored a text for the mobilization of the Quebec nation, entitled "La force du désir" (The Force of Desire). She was a signatory of the Manifeste pour un Québec solidaire (2005). She has lectured extensively in Quebec and New Brunswick on a variety of women's topics. On 23 May 2003 Pedneault presented a show for the 30th anniversary of the Council for the Status of Women, drawing from three decades of feminism in Quebec.

She was the "honorary" godmother of the Teachers' Union of the Cégep de Jonquière (SPECJ) since 2004. She died of cancer at the age of 56.

== Legacy ==
Pauline Marois, leader of the Parti Québécois, said of Pedneault [translated]: "Already, we feel a great void in the Quebec landscape [...] She was one of those women of deep conviction and fighting who helped make Quebec a better place to live."

Pedneault was posthumously declared Patriote de l'année 2009 by the Saint-Jean-Baptiste Society (SSJB) of Montreal. Five years after her death, the biography Qui est Hélène Pedneault? was published, the work of journalist Sylvie Dupont. Beginning in 2015, the SSJB began awarding the Prix Hélène-Pedneault for the advancement of women's interests. Recipients include Régine Laurent, Josée Boileau and Claire Bolduc.

== Works ==
- La Déposition (theatrical script)
  - first edition La Déposition (in French). Montreal: VLB. 1988.
  - second edition La Déposition (in French). Outremont: Lanctôt. 1997. p. 107. ISBN 978-2-89485-025-1.
  - third edition La Déposition (in French). 2007.
- Chroniques délinquantes de la vie en rose (in French). VLB. 1988. p. 164. ISBN 978-2890052970.
  - 2nd edition Les Chroniques délinquantes de La vie en rose (in French). Outremont: Michel Brûle/Lanctôt. 2002. p. 176. ISBN 978-2-89485-237-8.
- Biographies of Clémence DesRochers:
  - Notre Clémence (in French). Montreal: Éditions de l'Homme, Paroles d'ici. 1989. p. 447. ISBN 978-2761908528.
  - Tout Clémence (in French). Montreal: VLB. 1993. pp. 318.
- Pour en finir avec l'excellence (in French). Montreal: Boréal. 1992. p. 318. ISBN 978-2890524941.
- La douleur des volcans (in French). Montreal: VLB. 1992. p. 145. ISBN 978-2890054943.
- Evidence to the contrary. Montreal: NuAge Editions. 1993. p. 62. ISBN 978-0-921833-07-9.
- Les carnets du lac (1993–1999) (in French). Outremont: Lanctôt. 2000. ISBN 978-2-89485-131-9.
- Mon enfance et autres tragédies politiques (in French). 2004.

Hélène Pedneault's archival fonds are preserved in the Montreal archives center of the Bibliothèque et Archives nationales du Québec (BAnQ).

== Awards ==
- 1992 – Prix Edgar-Lespérance for La douleur des volcans
- 2000 – Prix littéraires du Salon du livre du Saguenay-Lac-Saint-Jean for Les carnets du lac 1993–1999
- 2004 – Prix Abitibi-Consolidated, Internet category
- 2009 – Prix Patriote de l'année (awarded posthumously) by the Société Saint-Jean-Baptiste de Montréal (SSJB)
