= An Act to promote the French language in Québec =

1969 law

Bill 63, formally the "Law to promote the French language in Quebec" (French: Loi pour promouvoir la langue française au Québec), was a language law passed in 1969 in Quebec, Canada.

== Background ==
In the 1960s, the Government of Quebec commissioned a report about the state of the French language in the province. The report showed that in some areas of the province, residents who spoke only French had difficulty finding employment and doing everyday business. As a result, plans were begun to form a committee, called the Gendron Commission, to make recommendations for promoting the use of French in Quebec.

When the Catholic school board of Saint Leonard, Quebec, insisted that children of immigrants, mostly Italians, be required to go to French schools, controversy and violence erupted. In response, the Union Nationale government of Jean-Jacques Bertrand passed Bill 63 without waiting for the Gendron Commission's report.

== Details ==
Section 2 of the bill allowed all residents of Quebec an English-language education for anyone desiring it for their children. That right was known as "freedom of choice."

The law also promoted the French language:

- The Ministry of Education was to ensure that students graduating from English schools in Quebec had a working knowledge of French.
- French courses were to be available to all students enrolled in Quebec schools.
- The Ministry of Education was to make French courses available to all immigrants entering Quebec.
- The mandate of the Office québécois de la langue française was extended.

== Aftermath ==
Bill 63 fell short of the expectations of many francophones, such as many Quebec nationalists, who expected that French would become the common public language of all Quebec residents. Their main criticism of the law was that it allowed all Quebec residents to send their children to either English or French schools. Opposition to the law led to the coalition Mouvement Québec français.

In 1974, the Liberal government of Robert Bourassa superseded the act by the Official Language Act.

== See also ==
- Official Languages Act of Canada
- Legal dispute over Quebec's language policy
- Office québécois de la langue française
- Quiet Revolution
- Language policy
