= Guy Bertrand (broadcaster) =

Canadian linguist and radio presenter

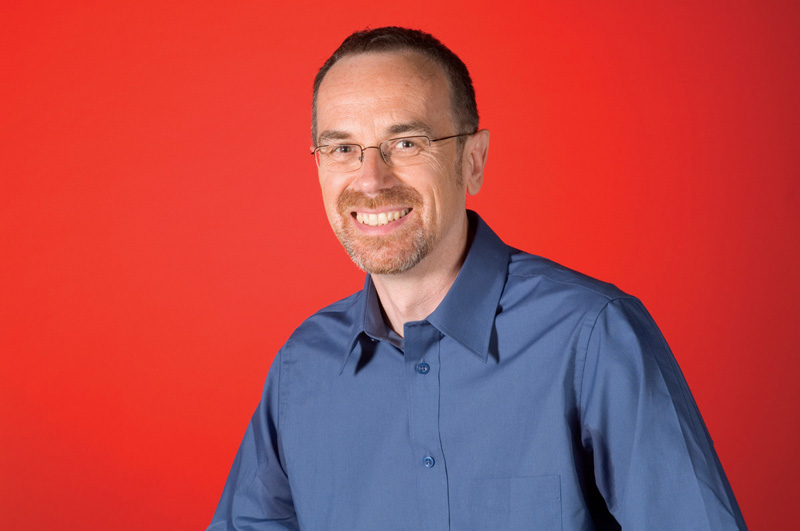
Guy Bertrand, Official Photo, CBC, 2006

Guy Bertrand (born April 5, 1954) is a Canadian linguist and broadcast personality.

He was born in Trois-Rivières, Quebec. A media language specialist, he has written the linguistic standards and practices for the French CBC services. His daily broadcasts are heard across Canada on Première Chaîne and Télévision de Radio-Canada. As of 2024, he has worked for Radio-Canada for 33 years.

== Radio and Television Programmes ==
Presently Aired:

- Phare Ouest (Vancouver – Radio, 2018- )
- Sur le vif (Ottawa – Radio, 2016- )
- Par ici l'info (Sherbrooke – Radio, 2018- )
- Des matins en or (Abitibi-Temiscamingue – Radio, 2013- )
- Le matin du Nord (Sudbury – Radio, 2009- )
- Matins sans frontières (Windsor – Radio, 2015- )
- Info-réveil (Rimouski – Radio, 2008- )
- Bon pied, bonne heure (Matane – Radio, 2008- )
- Le 6 à 9 (Saint-Boniface/Winnipeg – Radio, 2012- )
- Le café show (Edmonton – Radio, 2011- )
- Le réveil (Halifax – Radio, 2011- )
- Le réveil (Charlottetown – Radio, 2014- )
- L'heure de pointe – Acadie (Atlantic Provinces – Radio, 2013- )
- Pour faire un monde (Regina – Radio, 2022- )
- Y a pas deux matins pareils (Toronto – Radio, 2013- )
- Capsule linguistique (Canada – Radio, 1994- )
- Soit dit en passant (Canada – Radio, 2021-2024)

Past Broadcasts:

- Marina Orsini (Canada – Television, 2015–2019)
- C'est bien meilleur le matin (Montreal – Radio, 1998–2013)
- Pour le plaisir (Canada – Television, 2007–2013)
- C'est ça la vie (Canada – Television, 2012–2013)
- Des kiwis et des hommes (Canada – Television, 2010–2011)
- Style libre (Saguenay – Radio, 2017–2020)
- 360 PM (Trois-Rivières – Radio, 2016–2020)
- C'est pas trop tôt en Estrie (Sherbrooke – Radio, 2016–2018)
- Le 15-18 (Montreal – Radio, 2013–2017)
- Café, boulot, Dodo (Saguenay – Radio, 2004–2017)
- Les voies du retour (Ottawa – Radio, 2013- 2016)
- Québec express (Quebec City – Radio, 1999–2001)
- Nulle part ailleurs (Ottawa – Radio, 1999–2001)
- Vivement samedi (Ottawa – Radio, 2001–2002)
- Au gré des jours (Sept-Iles – Radio, 2001–2005)
- Fréquence 90 (Ottawa – Radio, 2003–2004)
- Chez nous le matin (Trois-Rivieres – Radio, 2003–2011)
- Tour de piste (Canada – Radio, 2006-2006)
- Bonjour la Côte (Sept-Iles – Radio, 2006–2007)
- Les arts et les autres (Toronto – Radio, 2006–2007)
- Sonnez les matines (Matane – Radio, 2006–2008)
- Tam-Tam (international – Radio, 2007–2012)
- Radio-Réveil (Saint-Boniface/Winnipeg – Radio, 2008–2012)
- Le monde selon Mathieu (Ottawa – Radio, 2005–2013)
- Six pieds au-dessus de la mer (Vancouver – Radio, 2010–2012)
- La nuit qui bat (Canada – Radio, 2011–2012)
- Libre échange (Atlantic Provinces – Radio, 2011–2013)
- Capsule Radar (Canada – Radio, 1992–1994)
- CBV bonjour! (Quebec City – Radio, 1991)
- Les mots pour le dire (Montreal – Television, 2009-2010)
- Point du jour (Regina – Radio, 2013-2022)

== Awards ==
- Prix Georges-Émile-Lapalme 2017 (Prix du Québec)
- Prix Pythagore 2021 (Université du Québec à Trois-Rivières)

== Other achievements ==
- Member of the jury – Dictée des Amériques (2002–2009)
- Member of the jury – Prix Francopub (2005–2017)
- Member of the jury – Prix Georges-Émile-Lapalme (2010)
- President of the jury – Prix Georges-Émile-Lapalme (2011)
- Member of the Scientific Committee – Franqus project (Université de Sherbrooke)
- Honorary President – Concours national de lecture (2008–2009)
- Author – Dictée Éric-Fournier (2009)
- Author – La grande dictée de la Saskatchewan (2010)

== Published books ==
- 400 capsules linguistiques (1999)
- 400 capsules linguistiques II (2006)
- Pris au mot (2015)
