= Jean-Damien Rolland =

Canadian politician

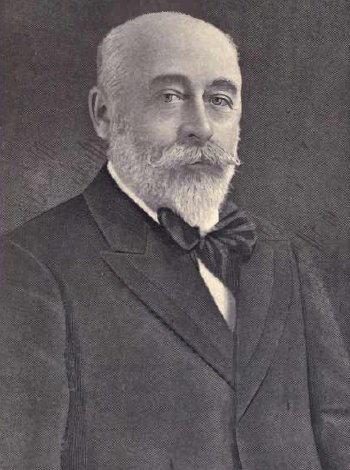

Member of the Legislative Council of Quebec for de Salaberry
- In office 1896–1912
- Preceded by: Henry Starnes
- Succeeded by: Achille Bergevin

Personal details
- Born: 23 February 1841 Montreal, Province of Canada
- Died: 16 November 1912 (aged 71) Montreal, Quebec
- Relations: Jean-Baptiste Rolland, father

Jean-Damien Rolland (23 February 1841 – 16 November 1912) was a Canadian manufacturer, municipal politician, and legislative councillor of Quebec.

Born in Montreal, Lower Canada, the eldest son of Jean-Baptiste Rolland and Esther Boin, Rolland started working as a clerk in 1857 in his father's book and paper business. In 1859, he formed a partnership with his father called J.-B. Rolland & Fils. He would eventually become president of the Rolland Paper Company.

From 1872 to 1876, he was a member of the town council of Hochelaga. From 1876 to 1879, he was the mayor. After the annexation of Hochelaga to Montreal in 1882, he became a member of the Montreal City Council serving until 1892. In 1896, he was called to the Legislative Council of Quebec for the division of Salaberry. He served until his death in 1912.

In 1907 he was elected President of the Canadian Manufacturers' Association.

He died in Montreal in 1912 and is buried in the Notre-Dame-des-Neiges Cemetery.
