= Jean-Denis Gendron =

Canadian linguist and academic (1925–2025)

- Born: 1 January 1925; Saint-Antoine-sur-Richelieu, Quebec, Canada
- Died: 16 February 2025 (aged 100)
- Education: Université Laval; University of Paris; University of Strasbourg
- Occupations: Linguist, academic

Jean-Denis Gendron (1 January 1925 – 16 February 2025) was a Canadian linguist and academic.

A graduate of the Université Laval and a doctor of letters of the University of Strasbourg, he was President of the Commission of Inquiry on the Situation of the French Language and Linguistic Rights in Quebec.

Gendron died on 16 February 2025, at the age of 100.

== Honors ==
- Member of the Conseil international de la langue française
- Member of the Royal Society of Canada
- Member of the Order of North American Francophones
- Officer of the Ordre des Palmes académiques
- Officer of the National Order of Quebec
- Prix Acfas Marcel-Vincent

== Publications ==
- D'où vient l'accent des Québécois ? Et celui des Parisiens ? (2007)
- La modernisation de l'accent québécois (2014)
