= Gisèle Lamoureux =

Canadian photographer and scientist

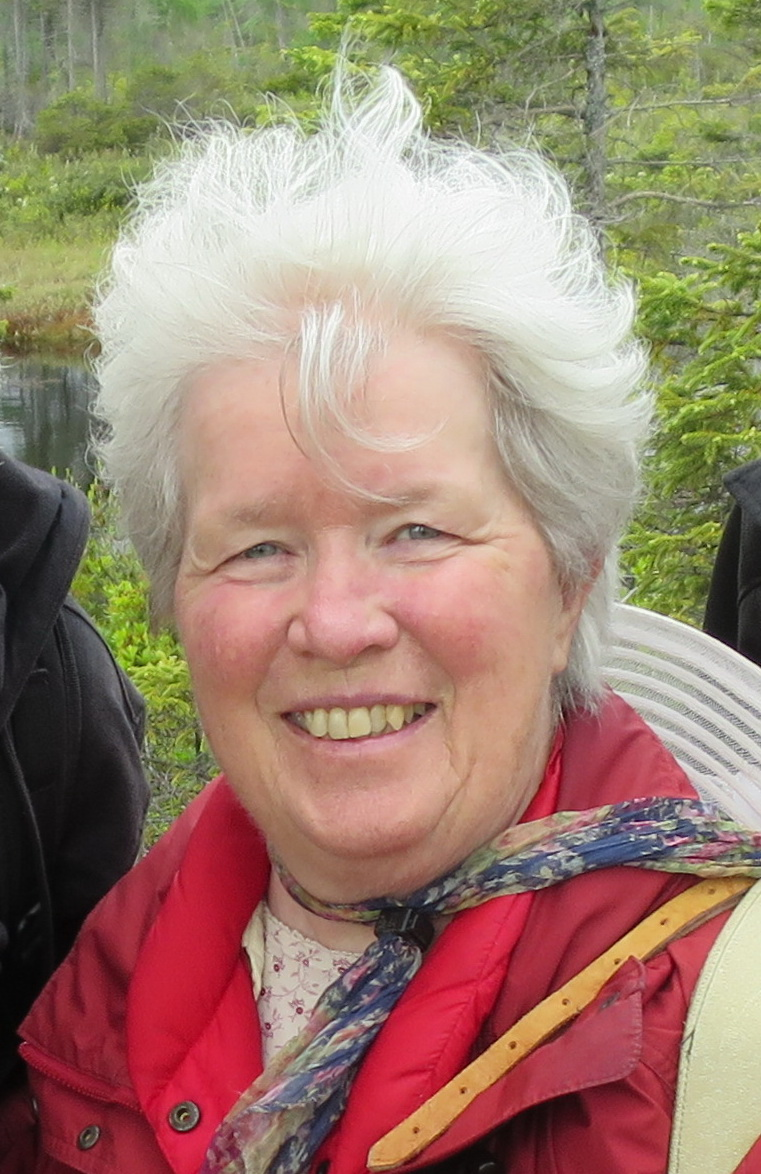
- Gisèle Lamoureux dans la Grande Plée Bleue
- Born: October 5, 1942; Montreal, Quebec, Canada
- Died: June 23, 2018 (aged 75); Lévis, Quebec, Canada
- Education: Université de Montréal, Université Laval
- Known for: photography, botany, ecology

Gisèle Lamoureux, CM CQ (October 5, 1942 – June 23, 2018) was a Canadian photographer, botanist and ecologist.

== Biography ==
Born in Montreal, Quebec, Lamoureux studied at the Université de Montréal and the Université Laval.

She is the founder of Guides Fleurbec which made their debut in the 1970s. She is an activist for the protection of wild garlic since 1979, an initiative taken up when the Quebec law for the protection of endangered species was enacted.

== Awards and honours ==
- 1989 - Prix Georges-Préfontaine from the Association des biologistes du Québec
- 1996 - Knight of the Ordre national du Québec
- 1997 - Mérite de la conservation de la flore from the Quebec Ministry of Environment
- 1998 - Honoris causa Doctor of Sciences of the Université Laval
- 1999 - Made a Member of the Order of Canada for having "contributed to the protection of Canada's exceptional environment".
- 2015 - Prix Georges-Émile-Lapalme

== Selected bibliography ==
- G Lamoureux, R Larose. Flore printanière. 2001. Fleurbec
- Gisèle Lamoureux and Patrick Nantel. Cultiver des plantes sauvages sans leur nuire (French). 1999. Fleurbec.

== Selected academic publications ==
- Gisèle Lamoureux and Miroslav M. Grandtner. Contribution à l'étude écologique des dunes mobiles. I. Les éléments phytosociologiques. Canadian Journal of Botany, 1977, 55(2): 158-171
- Gisèle Lamoureux and Miroslav M. Grandtner. Contribution à l'étude écologique des dunes mobiles. II. Les conditions édaphiques. Canadian Journal of Botany, 1978, 56(7): 818-832.
- Gisèle Lamoureux and Estelle Lacoursière. Etude préliminaire des groupements végétaux caractérisant quelques gîtes larvaires à moustiques dans la région de Trois-Rivières (Québec). Canadian Journal of Botany, 1976, 54(3-4): 177-190.
