= Charles-Séraphin Rodier Jr =

Canadian politician

The Hon. Charles-Séraphin Rodier

Senator for Mille Isles, Quebec
- In office December 1, 1888 – January 26, 1890
- Appointed by: John A. Macdonald
- Preceded by: Jean-Baptiste Rolland
- Succeeded by: Louis-Rodrigue Masson

Personal details
- Born: October 6, 1818 Montreal, Lower Canada
- Died: January 26, 1890 (aged 71) Montreal, Quebec
- Party: Conservative Party
- Relations: Charles-Séraphin Rodier, uncle

Charles-Séraphin Rodier (October 6, 1818 – January 26, 1890) was a Canadian businessman and politician.

Born in Montreal, Lower Canada, the son of Jean-Baptiste Rodier and Marie-Desanges Sedillot dit Montreuil, Rodier was the nephew of Charles-Séraphin Rodier, a mayor of Montreal. Rodier would later use the suffix "Jr" to his name to tell himself apart from his uncle. Rodier started working at age fourteen as a carpenter and after as a building contractor. He later started a factory to make agricultural tools for farmers. He used to ask for mortgages in exchange for the equipment, and as a result, he gathered a lot of land in the Montreal region.

In 1861, he co-founded the Banque Jacques-Cartier and was a director until 1870. He was also a vice-president from 1870 to 1876. From 1847 to 1850, he was a member of the Montreal City Council for the ward of Saint-Antoine. A supporter of the federal Conservative Party, Rodier was called to the Senate of Canada for the senatorial division of Mille Isles on the advice of Prime Minister John A. Macdonald in 1888. He served until his death in 1890.

He was president of the Saint-Jean-Baptiste Society of Montreal. In 1869, he help form the 64th Châteauguay and Beauharnois Regiment (Voltigeurs Canadiens of Beauharnois), becoming its first lieutenant-colonel.
