= Prix Georges-Émile-Lapalme =

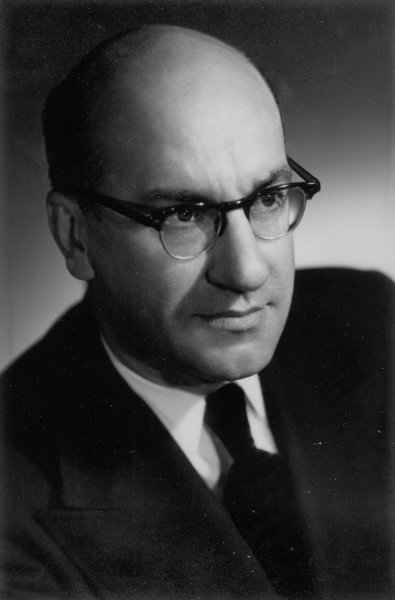
Georges-Émile Lapalme, 1950

The Prix Georges-Émile-Lapalme is an award by the Government of Quebec that is part of the Prix du Québec, given to individuals who have made an outstanding contribution to the quality and diffusion of the French language written or spoken in Québec. The activities recognized for this award are culture, communications, education, administration, research, labour, commerce and business.

It is named in honour of Georges-Émile Lapalme.

== Winners ==
- 1997 - Pierre Bourgault
- 1998 - Fernand Daoust
- 1999 - Marc Favreau
- 2000 - Henri Bergeron
- 2001 - Michel Bergeron
- 2002 - Jean-Claude Corbeil
- 2003 - André Gaulin
- 2004 - Jacques Languirand
- 2005 - Jean-Marc Léger
- 2006 - Marie-Éva de Villers
- 2007 - Gaston Bellemare
- 2008 - Paul-André Crépeau
- 2009 - Monique C. Cormier
- 2010 - Lise Bissonnette
- 2011 - Jacques Duval
- 2012 - Benoît Melançon
- 2013 - Paul Gérin-Lajoie
- 2014 - Denis Vaugeois
- 2015 - Gisèle Lamoureux
- 2016 - Noëlle Guilloton
- 2017 - Guy Bertrand
- 2018 - Lise Gauvin
- 2019 - Hélène Cajolet-Laganière
- 2020 - Solange Chalvin
- 2021 - Claude Poirier
- 2022 - Louis Mercier
- 2023 - Jacques Leclerc
- 2024 - Françoise Armand
- 2025 - Robert Auclair
