= Jean-Baptiste Rolland =

Canadian politician

The Hon. Jean-Baptiste Rolland
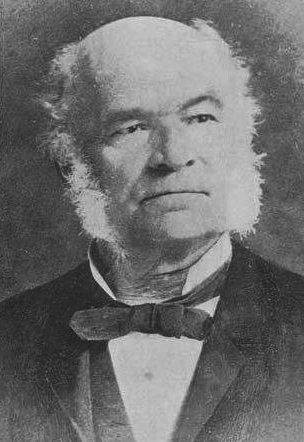

Senator for Mille Isles, Quebec
- In office 1887–1888
- Appointed by: John A. Macdonald
- Preceded by: Louis-Adélard Senécal
- Succeeded by: Charles-Séraphin Rodier Jr

Personal details
- Born: 2 January 1815 Verchères, Lower Canada
- Died: 22 March 1888 (aged 73) Montreal, Quebec
- Party: Conservative
- Relations: Raymond Préfontaine, son-in-law

Jean-Baptiste Rolland (2 January 1815 – 22 March 1888) was a Canadian printer, bookseller, businessman, and politician.

Born in Verchères, Lower Canada, the son of Pierre Rolland and Euphrasine Donay, his family moved to Saint-Hyacinthe in 1828. In 1832, Rolland moved to Montreal where he worked as an apprentice typographer. In 1836, he worked as a journeyman for a Montreal newspaper. He later co-founded the printing firm of Rolland and Thompson and in 1843 decided to open a book shop in Montreal. He also printed and bound books. In 1859, he formed a partnership with his eldest son, Jean-Damien Rolland, and the firm was called J.-B. Rolland et Fils. His other sons would also join the partnership. In 1881, they decided to manufacture their own paper and opened a paper mill called the Rolland Paper Company (now a division of Cascades inc.).

In 1861, he was elected to the Montreal City Council for the East Ward and served until 1867. He was re-elected in 1871 and served until 1875. He was called to the Senate of Canada in 1887 for the senatorial division of Mille Isles on the advice of Prime Minister John A. Macdonald. A Conservative, he served barely five months until his death in 1888. His son-in-law was Raymond Préfontaine.
