= Solange Chalvin =

Canadian journalist (1932–2024)

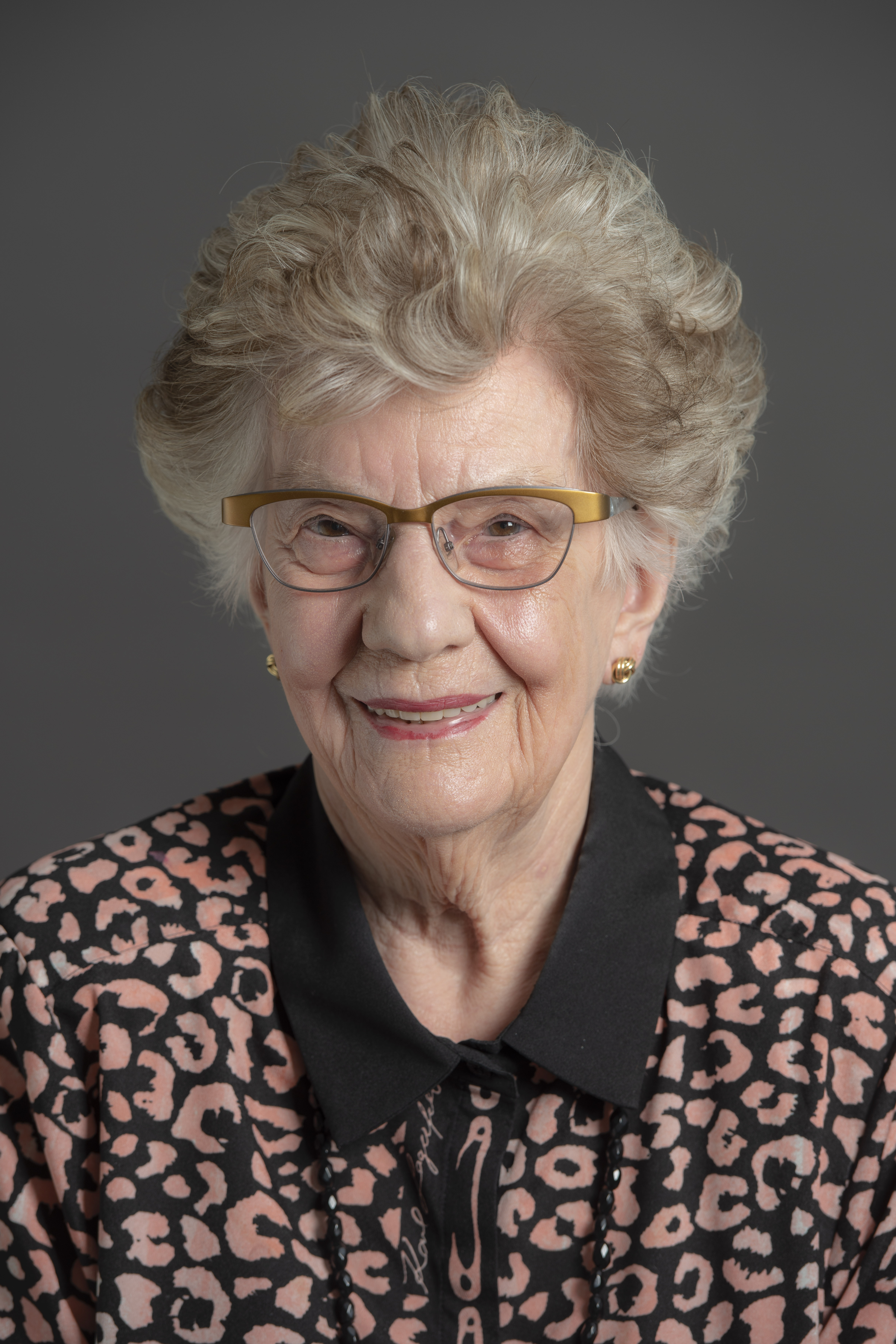
- Chalvin in 2020
- Born: March 20, 1932
- Died: October 20, 2024 (aged 92)
- Occupation: Journalist; writer
- Notable works: Comment on abrutit nos enfants (1962)

Solange Chalvin (March 20, 1932 – October 20, 2024) was a Canadian writer and journalist. She was one of the first women journalists at Le Devoir and co-authored Comment on abrutit nos enfants (1962), a significant text in the Quiet Revolution. She was an advocate for education reform and francization in Quebec.

== Career ==
Chalvin initially trained to become a secretary and began working at Le Devoir, a French-language newspaper in Montreal, in 1951 when she was twenty years old. She eventually began publishing columns under the guidance of editor-in-chief André Laurendeau, making her one of the first female journalists at the publication. In 1963, Chalvin began editing the newspaper's women's page, which she renamed "L'univers féminin." Chalvin's work in the column primarily focused on the social issues affecting women.

In 1962, Chalvin and her husband Michel co-authored the book Comment on abrutit nos enfants, a critique of the religious textbooks used in Quebec public schools, which they viewed as racist and sexist. The text became influential in the Quiet Revolution in Quebec and was praised by sociologist Guy Rocher, although at the time of its publication it was criticized by religious groups such as the Clerics of Saint Viator, the Sisters of the Assumption of the Blessed Virgin, and the De La Salle Brothers.

Chalvin later began working for the government of Quebec as a public servant. She was a manager of the Office québécois de la langue française (OQLF) and was responsible for the regional offices of the OQLF from 1979 to 1983.

=== Awards ===
- 1964 Canadian Women's Press Club Awards; Women's Page category
- 1969 Canadian Women's Press Club Awards
  - first place in the Features category (shared with Celine Legare)
  - third place in the News Story category for the article "Quand l'homme s'ennuie, quand il ne fait ni la guerre, ni l'amour, il se drogue"
- In 2020, Chalvin received the Prix Georges-Émile-Lapalme award from the government of Quebec.

== Personal life ==
Chalvin and her French-born husband, Michael, were both Catholic.

== Death ==
Chalvin died on October 20, 2024, at the age of 92.
