= Ferretti =

Ferretti may refer to:

- Ferretti (surname), an Italian surname
- Ferretti Group, an Italian conglomerate for boat-building
- Ferretti (cycling team), an Italian professional cycling team that existed from 1969 to 1972

== See also ==
- Ferretti Battery, a coastal battery and restaurant in Malta
