= Fernand Daoust =

Canadian trade unionist (1926–2020)

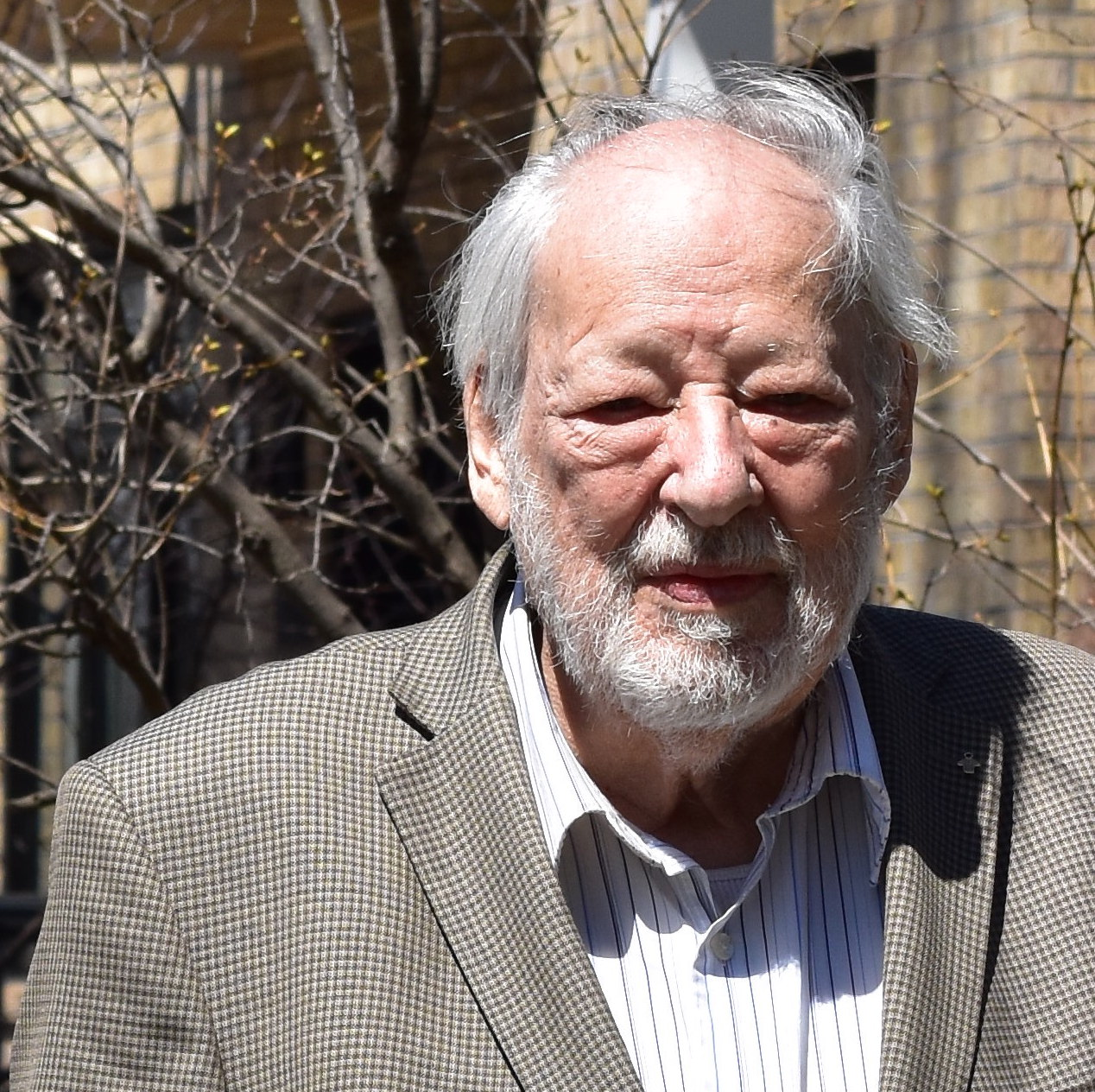
- Born: 26 October 1926; Montreal, Quebec, Canada
- Died: 23 January 2020 (aged 93); Montreal, Quebec, Canada
- Education: Université de Montréal
- Occupation: Trade unionist

Fernand Daoust (26 October 1926 – 23 January 2020) was a trade unionist in Quebec. He was the secretary general of the Fédération des travailleurs et travailleuses du Québec from 1969 to 1991 and its president from 1991 to 1993.

== Biography ==
Daoust studied economics and industrial relations at the Université de Montréal.

He began a career in trade unionism in 1950. He was active with the Canadian Congress of Labour and the Canadian Labour Congress.

From 1961 to 1963, he was a member of the organizing committee for the foundation of the New Democratic Party in Quebec. He ran as a candidate for the NDP in the 1962 and 1963 federal elections.

In 1964, he was candidate for president of the Quebec Federation of Labour (Fédération des travailleurs du Québec - FTQ); Louis Laberge was elected president and Daoust was elected vice-president. In 1969, Daoust became the secretary general of the FTQ, a job he held until 1991. He succeeded Laberge as president of the FTQ from 1991 until 1993.

After his retirement, Daoust was active with the small shareholders education and defense movement (Mouvement d'éducation et de défense des actionnaires - MÉDAC) with Yves Michaud.

== Death ==
Fernando Daoust died on 23 January, 2020 at the age of 93 from old age.

== Honours ==
- 1994 – Ordre des francophones d'Amérique
- 1994 – Médaille d’argent Bene merenti de patria of the Mouvement national des Québécoises et des Québécois
- 1998 – Prix Georges-Émile-Lapalme
- 2001 – Knight of the National Order of Quebec

== See also ==
Books about Fernand Daoust:

- André Leclerc, Fernand Daoust - Le jeune militant syndical, nationaliste et socialiste. Tome 1 : 1926-1964, M éditeur, Mont-Royal, 2013, 304 pages, ISBN 978-2-923986-86-9 (in French)
- André Leclerc, Fernand Daoust - Bâtisseur de la FTQ. Tome 2 : 1964-1993, M éditeur, Mont-Royal, 2013, ISBN 978-2-923986-88-3 (in French)
