= Solange Macamo =

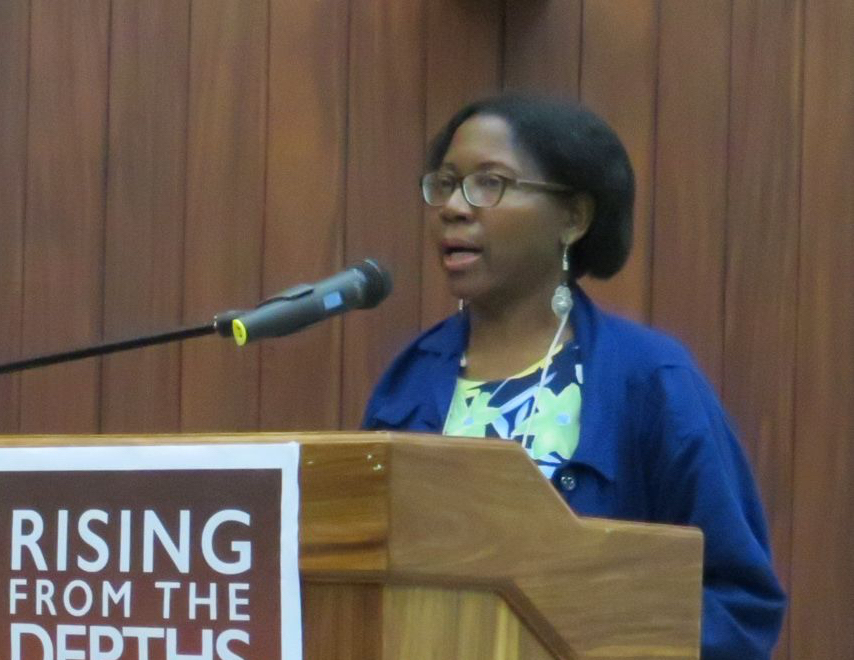
Solange Macamo

Dr Solange Laura Macamo is a lecturer of archaeology and heritage management at the Department of Archaeology and Anthropology, Eduardo Mondlane University, Mozambique. From 2010 to 2016 she was also the National Director for Cultural Heritage, Ministry of Culture and Tourism, Mozambique.

== Career ==
Macamo is a lecturer in archaeology and heritage in Mozambique. She studied for her doctorate at Uppsala University in archaeology of southern Mozambique from the thirteenth to eighteenth centuries. Her research interests include pottery from the Massangir District, where variations in pottery style reflect migration around the region. She has worked on rock art sites in Mozambique, viewing them as cultural landscapes. One of her geographical areas of interest is the Zambezi River Basin. Macamo also works on the archaeology of urban landscapes in Mozambique. She has advocated for the protection of Mozambique's underwater archaeology.

'Rising From the Depths' is an AHRC-funded research project exploring the coastal heritage of East Africa - Macamo is a co-investigator advising on regional co-ordination. One aspect of the project is exploring the textile heritage of Katembe, led by Macamo. She has lectured internationally on Mozambique's cultural heritage.

=== 'Privileged Places' ===
A major focus of Macamo's research has been to put forward the theoretical framework of 'privileged places' and how it can be adapted for Mozambique. This research has focussed on places such as Manyikeni, Niamara, Songo and Degue-Mufa. Macamo was the first person to introduce gendered analysis into the consideration of the sites. Her work at Niamara recognised it as part of a pair of sites with Magure, where Nimara (on a hill) represents the male and Magure (in the valley) the female. This work focuses on pre-colonial identities based on not just the stone buildings, but access to communications, resources and other factors.

=== Director for Cultural Heritage ===
In 2007, whilst deputy director for Cultural Heritage, Macamo brought together Portuguese and Japanese expertise in heritage management to build a model to support the World Heritage Site, the Island of Mozambique. Much of her work of the Island has focused on how communities can be involved with protecting and interpreting their cultural heritage. During her time as Director she co-produced a report examining twenty years of progress on cultural heritage management in Mozambique, recognising its challenges and opportunities. Whilst in 2015 she was a delegate to UNESCO's 20th session of the General Assembly of States Parties.

In 2017 Macamo shared the experience of building cultural practice in Mozambique with the "African Agendas" programme. In her work there she recognised the need for sustainability in their practice, the importance of cultural tourism and also that one of their top priorities is the preservation of the heritage of the country's armed struggle.
