= Michel Seymour =

Canadian philosopher (born 1954)

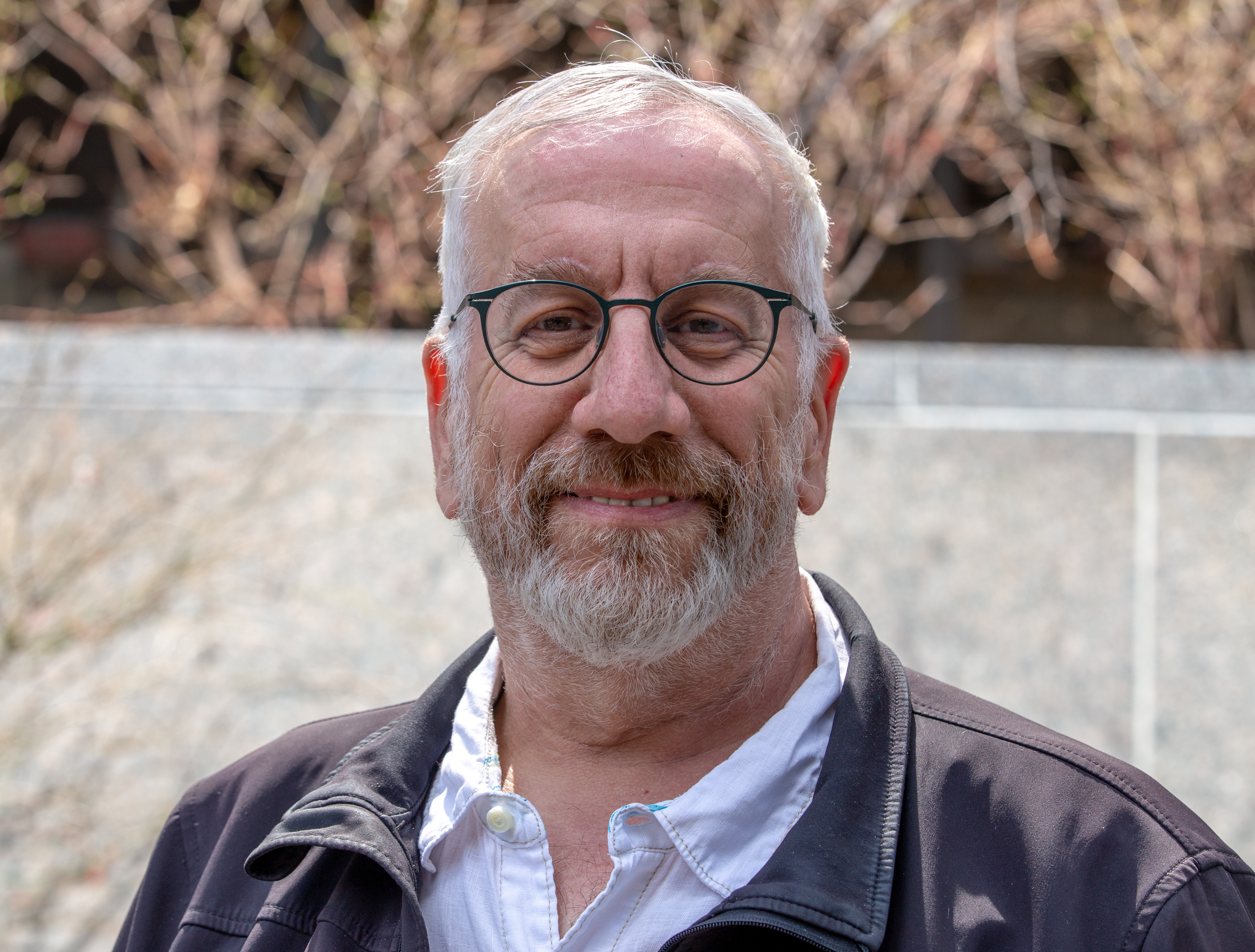
Michel Seymour in 2019

Michel Seymour (born 1954) is a Canadian philosopher from Quebec and a professor at the Université de Montréal, where he has been teaching analytical philosophy (philosophy of language and philosophy of mind) since 1990.

== Biography ==
After having obtained a Ph.D. in philosophy from the Université du Québec à Trois-Rivières in 1986, he continued to study in the same field for several years at Oxford University under the direction of John McDowell and at the University of California, Los Angeles under the direction of Tyler Burge. He was president of the Société de philosophie du Québec from 1994 to 1996.

He published in various English-language philosophy journals, including the Journal of Philosophy and Philosophical Studies as well as many more in French. He is also the author of several books and director of collective works.

== Main ideas ==
In the domain of philosophy of language, Michel Seymour holds an institutional and communitarian conception of language inspired in part from the thought of Ludwig Wittgenstein which he opposes to the idealism of Gottlob Frege, to the inneism of Noam Chomsky and to the psychologism of John Searle. According to Seymour, speaking a language is a rule-governed activity, where the rules express the social conditions of expression-use. The rules are specified by social conventions. The meaning of expressions is indeterminate, because the rules cannot anticipate all cases. Accordingly, Seymour endorses a semantics based on assertability conditions inspired from Saul Kripke which ties the meaning of expressions to their conventional usage.

In the domain of political philosophy, Seymour starts from John Rawls's Political Liberalism to defend a conception of collective rights equal in validity and importance to individual rights, a position which notably runs counter to that of Will Kymlicka on the subject. According to Seymour, liberalism cannot rest content with an attitude of toleration based on mere respect, but must rather foster an attitude of recognition based on mutual appreciation. This should be borne out in public policy aiming to the appreciation of peoples.

Seymour builds on this political liberalism to defend an inclusive conception of laïcité, which asks that institutions remain neutral and that individuals remain free. This would allow state employees to wear religious symbols, unless they occupy high-authority positions (President, Supreme Court Justice, etc).

Seymour is also well-known for supporting the independence of Quebec.

Since 2022, Michel Seymour has published several articles on the Russo-Ukrainian War, often in collaboration with historian Samir Saul. In these texts, he criticizes the role of the United States and NATO, whom he presents as central players in triggering and prolonging the Russo-Ukrainian war.

== Works ==
=== Selection of papers in English ===
- Québec Nationalism and Canadian Federalism, January 2001
- Exchange of letters between Michel Seymour and readers of the Inroads journal, November–December 2000
- On Redefining the Nation
- Québec and Canada at the Crossroads: A Nation within a Nation
- The anti-democratic drift of the federal government: A brief concerning Bill C-20
- Quebec's language laws: The long story of a complete misunderstanding
- Secession as a Remedial Right
- Nation-States, National Minorities and The Draft Treaty
- "Introduction: Questioning the Ethnic / Civic Dichotomy", in Rethinking Nationalism, Jocelyne Couture, Kai Nielsen et Michel Seymour (ed.), Canadian Journal of Philosophy, Supplementary Volume XXII, 1996, 1-60. ISBN 0-919491-22-7
- "Toward a Cosmopolitan Law of Peoples: Asserting the rights and obligations of persons and nations", in Michel Seymour (ed.), The Fate of the Nation-State, Montréal/Kingston, McGill-Queen's University Press, 2004, pp. 403–411.
- "Collective Rights in Multination States: From Ethical Individualism to the Law of Peoples", in Michel Seymour (ed.), The Fate of the Nation-State, Montréal/Kingston, McGill-Queen's University Press, 2004, pp. 105–129.
- "An Inclusive Nation That Does Not Deny Its Origins", in Michel Venne, Vive Quebec! New Thinking And New Approaches To the Quebec Nation, Toronto, James and Company, 2001, p. 146-154.
- "On Redefining the Nation", in Nenad Miscevic (ed.), Nationalism and Ethnic Conflict, Chicago and La Salle, Open Court, 2000, 25-55.

=== Books in English ===
- A Liberal Theory of Collective Rights, McGill-Queen's University Press, 2017.
- (Co-edited with Alain-G. Gagnon), Multinational Federalism: Problems and Prospects?, Houndmills, Palgrave Macmillan, 2012.
- (Ed.) The Plural States of Recognition, Houndmills, Palgrave Macmillan, 2010.
- (Co-edited with Matthias Fritsch), Reason and Emancipation. Essays on the philosophy of Kai Nielsen, Amherst, Prometheus Books, 2007.
- (Ed.) The Fate of the Nation-State, Montréal/Kingston, McGill/Queens University Press, 2004.
- (Co-edited with Jocelyne Couture et Kai Nielsen), Rethinking Nationalism, Supplementary Volume 22, Canadian Journal of Philosophy, Calgary, University of Calgary Press, 1996.

=== French monographs ===
- (Co-written with Samir Saul) Le conflit mondial du XXIe siècle, L’harmattan, 2025.
- Nation et autodétermination au XXIe siècle, Presses de l’Université de Montréal 2024
- Raison, déraison et religion, Montréal, Écosociété, 2021.
- (Co-written with Jérôme Gosselin-Tapp) La nation pluraliste, Montréal, PUM, 2018 (Prix de l’ACP).
- Une idée de l’université, Montréal, Boréal, 2013.
- De la tolérance à la reconnaissance, Montréal, Boréal, 2008 (Prix de l’ACP et prix de la FCSH).
- Profession philosophe, Montréal, PUM, 2006.
- L’institution du langage, Montréal, PUM, 2005.
- Le pari de la démesure, Montréal, L’Hexagone, 2001 (Prix Richard-Arès de l’Action nationale).
- La nation en question, Montréal, L’Hexagone, 1999.
- Pensée, langage et communauté, Paris/Montréal, Vrin/Bellarmin, 1993.

=== Edited collective works in French ===
- Repenser l’autodétermination interne, Montréal, Les Éditions Thémis, 2016.
- (Co-edited with Christine Straehle), Territorialité, identité nationale et justice mondiale, Philosophiques, vol. 39, no. 2, 2012.
- (Co-edited with Guy Laforest), Le fédéralisme multinational en perspective: un modèle viable?, Bruxelles, Peter Lang, 2011.
- La politique de la reconnaissance et la théorie critique, Politique et Sociétés, vol. 28, no. 3, 2009.
- La Reconnaissance dans tous ses états. Repenser les politiques de pluralisme culturel, Montréal, Québec Amérique, coll. «Débats», 2009.
- États-nations, multinations et organisations supranationales, Montréal, Liber, 2002.
- Nationalité, citoyenneté et solidarité, Montréal, Liber, 1999.
- Une nation peut-elle se donner la constitution de son choix?, Montréal, Bellarmin, 1995
