= Solange Mabignath =

Gabonese politician (born 1958)

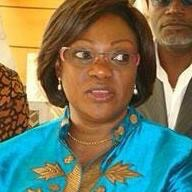
- Born: 23 March 1958 (age 68); Franceville, Gabon
- Citizenship: Gabonese
- Occupations: Politician, administrator
- Children: 4

Solange Mabignath (born 23 March 1958) is a Gabonese politician and administrator.

== Early life and education ==
Mabignath was born on 23 March 1958 in Franceville to Georges Mabignath, a teacher and then mayor of the third arrondissement of Libreville and Marie-Antoinette Mabignath, a teacher. She is a graduate of the Ecole Nationalie d'Administration.

== Career ==
Mabignath served as a diplomat in the 1990s, including as vice-consul to France and UNESCO. She was a member of the Economic and Social Council and served as an advisor to the Palais de la Sejour in Libreville.

A member of the Gabonese Democratic Party, Mabignath was a municipal councillor in Franceville. She joined the government in 2005 after the re-election of President Omar Bongo as Minister Delegate to the Minister of Education in charge of Primary Education. After a government reshuffle in 2008 she was appointed Minister Delegate to the Minister of Finance in charge of privatization. After Bongo's death and the subsequent inauguration of Ali Bongo Ondimba, she was appointed President of the High Authority of Safety and Facilitation of the Libreville Leon Mba International Airport.

Mabignah is President of the Albertine Amissa Foundation Bongo Ondimba and Global Business Roundtable Gabon.
