= Jean Dorion =

Canadian politician (1942–2026)

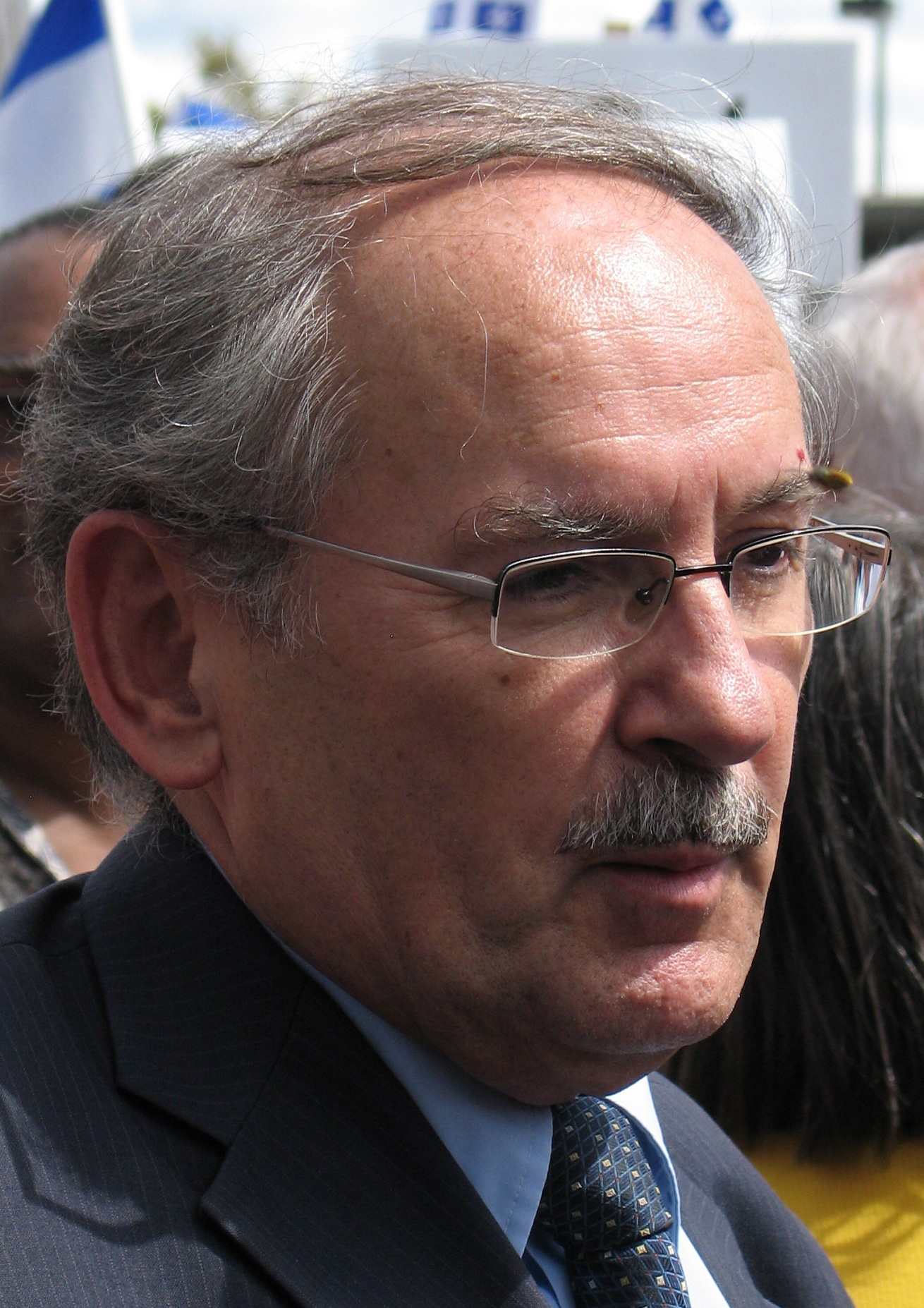
- Dorion in 2007

Member of Parliament for Longueuil—Pierre-Boucher
- In office 2008–2011
- Preceded by: Caroline St-Hilaire
- Succeeded by: Pierre Nantel

Personal details
- Born: August 17, 1942 Montreal, Quebec, Canada
- Died: January 23, 2026 (aged 83) Montreal, Quebec, Canada
- Party: Bloc Québécois
- Children: 5
- Profession: Sociologist, activist, politician

Jean Dorion (August 17, 1942 – January 23, 2026) was a Canadian politician, sociologist and a Quebec nationalist leader. He was a President of the Saint-Jean-Baptiste Society of Montreal (SSJBM) and was the treasurer of the affiliated Mouvement national des Québécoises et des Québécois (MNQ). A polyglot, he spoke six languages, including Japanese, his wife's native language. He was elected as a member of parliament for the Bloc Québécois in the 2008 Canadian federal election, in the riding of Longueuil—Pierre-Boucher.

== Early life and career ==
Starting in the 1960s, several years before the adoption of the Charter of the French Language, Dorion was a vocal advocate of French language rights. He worked in the Government of Quebec, first as political attaché for Minister of Immigration Jacques Couture, and later as Chief of Cabinet of Minister Gérald Godin when he held the responsibility of the application of the Charter of the French Language.

He was President of the Saint-Jean-Baptiste Society of Montreal from 1989 to 1994. Afterwards, he held the role of General Delegate for five and a half years at the General Delegation of Quebec in Tokyo. He was returned to the post of President of the SSJBM in 2003, succeeding Guy Bouthillier.

Dorion stated that Quebec's Bill 21 which prevents public servants with authority from wearing religious symbols is aimed at Muslims and other religious minorities. Dorion avowed that the CAQ's secular charter exploits 'petty prejudices' against immigrants to Quebec, and that 'I totally disagree with [the Bloc Québécois] on that point.'

== Personal life and death ==
In August 1989, on a stroll through Old Montreal, Dorion met Hiromi, a Japanese tourist looking for directions. She was then living in the American city of Cleveland, completing a doctoral thesis in nursing science. Speaking some Japanese, he guided her in her native language and charmed her. She learned French and moved to Montreal on June 23, 1990, in time to witness, two days later, one of the biggest and most famous Saint-Jean-Baptiste Day parades in history (after the end of the Meech Lake Accord).

They were married on May 4, 1991. Five children were born from this union. The children followed Saturday courses to complete their Japanese culture and spoke Japanese at home.

Dorion died in Montreal from complications of Parkinson's disease and prostate cancer on January 23, 2026, at the age of 83.
