= Commission of Inquiry on the Situation of the French Language and Linguistic Rights in Quebec =

1968 Canadian commission

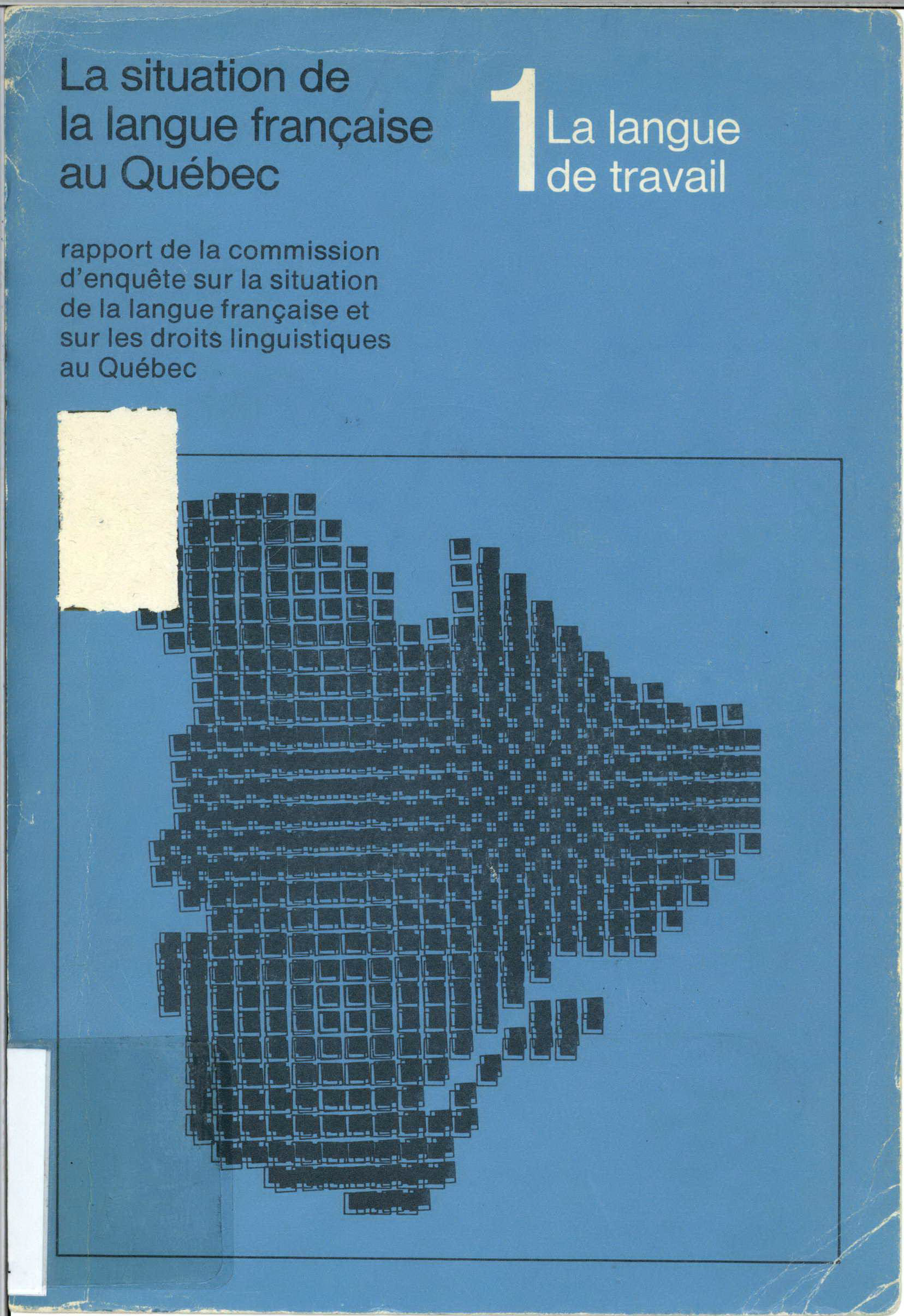
Front cover of the Report of the Commission of Inquiry on the Position of the French Language and on Language Rights in Québec, vol. 1.

The Commission of Inquiry on the Situation of the French Language and Linguistic Rights in Quebec was established under the Union Nationale government of Jean-Jacques Bertrand on December 9, 1968.

It was commissioned in response to conflicts in the Catholic school board in Saint-Léonard. The Mouvement pour l'intégration scolaire (MIS), created by francophone parents in the middle of the Saint-Leonard Crisis, wished for mandatory French-language education for allophones, but immigrants, mostly of Italian origin were supported by anglophones in creating the Saint Leonard English Catholic Association of Parents to defend being able to choose either English or French schools.

== Composition ==
Premier Jean-Jacques Bertrand appointed the following people as commissioners:

- Jean-Denis Gendron, president
- Guy Frégault
- Madeleine Doyon-Ferland
- Edward McWhinney
- Nicolas Matesco-Matte
- Aimé Gagnon

== Mandate ==
The commission was mandated to propose measures "to ensure 1) the respect of the linguistic rights of the majority as well as the protection of the rights of minorities and 2) the free blooming and diffusion of the French language in all activity sectors at the educational, cultural, social and economic levels." Because the linguist Jean-Denis Gendron presided the commission, it is often referred to in French as the Commission Gendron.

== Report ==
The final report of the commission was published on February 13, 1973. It consisted of three volumes:

- Livre I, La langue de travail (Language of work), 379 pages
- Livre II, Les droits linguistiques (Linguistic rights), 474 pages
- Livre III, Les groupes ethniques (Ethnic groups), 570 pages

On the subject of the language of work, the commissioners concluded:

It comes out that if French is not about to disappear among francophones, neither is it the predominant language in the Quebec labour market. French seems useful only to francophones. In Quebec even, it is in the end a marginal language, since non-francophones need it very little. A great number of francophones in important tasks use English as often, and sometimes more, than their mother tongue. And that, even though francophones in Quebec are a strong majority, in the work force as well as in the total population.

On the subject of the language of instructions, it noted:

The immigrants arrived in Quebec to improve their material condition and to insure a better future for their children. They were obliged to work in English to live and they saw French Canadians give them the example. They observed that in Montreal at least, a part of the French-Canadian parents were sending their children to English schools and private schools, each time they had the financial means to do it. They therefore followed the same path. Their bilingualism seemed absolutely necessary to them, and they never stopped demanding neutral bilingual schools, so that their children could get the best possible training.

The report recommend the government to give Quebec a policy in which the general objective would be: "to make French the common language of Quebecers, that is to say, a language which, being known to everyone, could be used as a communication tool in contact situations between francophones and non-francophones." Thus far, English, the language of the majority in Canada and North America, the language of socioeconomic promotion for most workers, had been playing a much greater role than French as an interethnic language inside Quebec.

The commission recommended the Quebec government make French the sole official language of Quebec and declare French and English the national languages of Quebec. The report also included some 31 measures devised to reinforce the position of the French language in the workplace.

Following the presentation of this report, the National Assembly of Quebec, then under a Liberal government, passed the Official Language Act. The Act was ultimately supplanted by the 1977 Charter of the French Language.

== See also ==
- Demolinguistics of Quebec
- Languages of Canada
- Language policy
- Royal Commission on Bilingualism and Biculturalism
