= Mouvement national des Québécoises et des Québécois =

Canadian federation

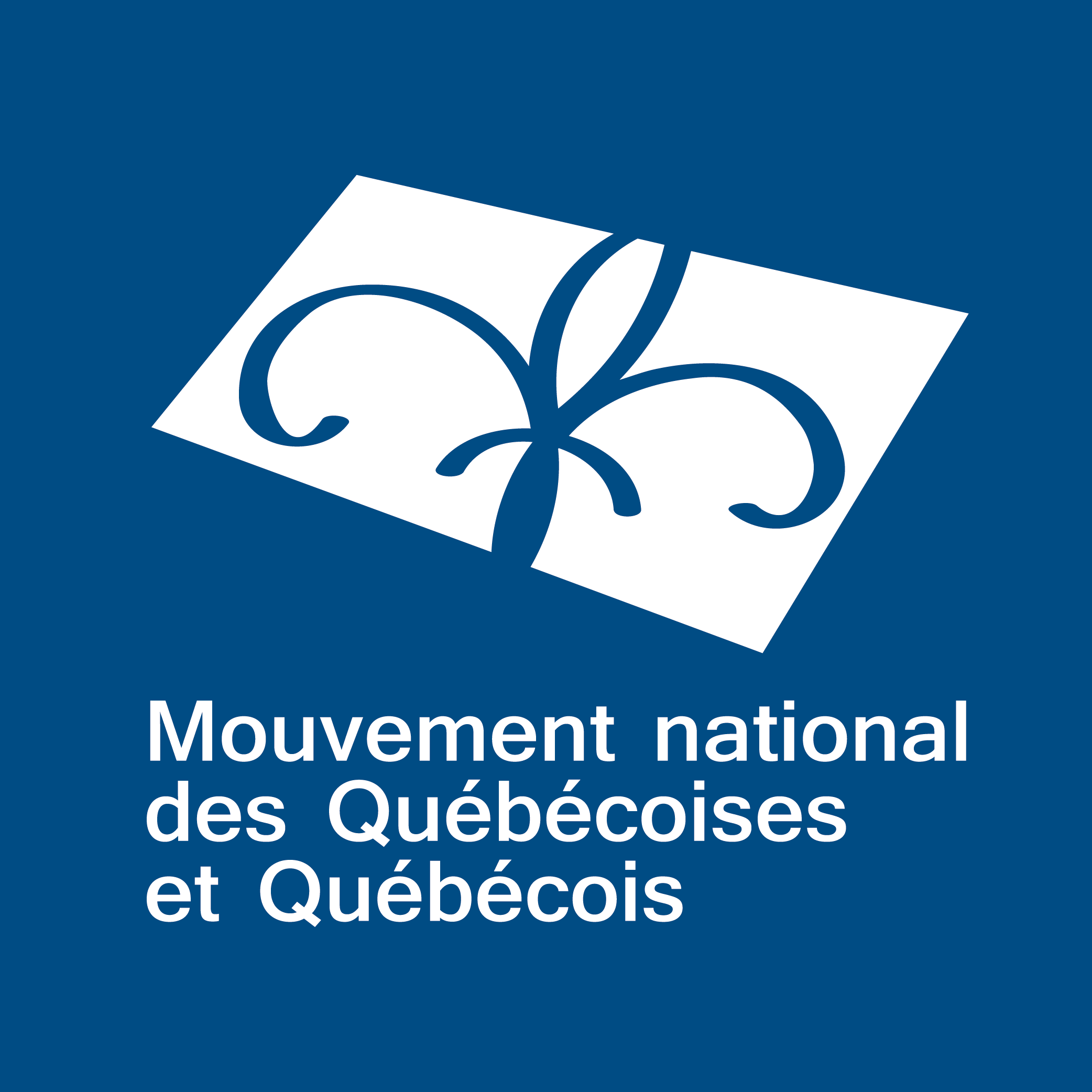
Official MNQ Logo

Founded in 1947, the Mouvement national des Québécoises et des Québécois (MNQ) is a federation that groups together the various patriotic organizations in Quebec, Canada. Its membership includes 19 National Societies (Sociétés nationales) and Saint-Jean-Baptiste Societies (SSJB) throughout all of Quebec.

Its stated mission is to "promote and defend the French language and national pride". Since 1984, the MNQ is responsible for coordinating the festivities for Quebec's national holiday on June 24. The current president is Martine Desjardins.

== Mission ==
Following the Estates General of French Canada, whose preparation began in 1964 and occurred between 1967 and 1969, the MNQ took a stance in favour of an independent Quebec and gave itself the mission to promote:

- A sovereign, pluralist and democratic Quebec
- French as the national language of Quebec
- Quebec pride

== Affiliated societies ==
It was founded by nine SSJB branches. It has 19 affiliated societies:

- Société nationale des Québécoises et des Québécois of Abitibi-Témiscamingue and Nord-du-Québec (1954)
- Société nationale des Québécois of Amiante
- Société nationale des Québécois et des Québécoises of The Capital (1972)
- Société Saint-Jean-Baptiste of Centre-du-Québec
- Société nationale des Québécois of Côte-Nord
- Société nationale of Est du Québec
- Société nationale des Québécoises et Québécois of Estrie
- Société nationale Gaspésie-Îles-de-la-Madeleine
- Société nationale des Québécoises et Québécois of Hautes-Rivières
- Société nationale des Québécoises et Québécois of Lanaudière (1945)
- Société nationale des Québécoises et Québécois of Laurentides (1952)
- Société Saint-Jean-Baptiste of Mauricie (1934)
- Saint-Jean-Baptiste Society of Montreal (1834)
- Société nationale des Québécois et des Québécoises of Outaouais
- Société nationale des Québécois of Richelieu-Saint-Laurent
- Société Saint-Jean-Baptiste of Richelieu-Yamaska
- Société nationale des Québécoises et des Québécois of Saguenay-Lac-Saint-Jean
- Société nationale des Québécois of Suroît
- Société nationale des Québécoises et des Québécois of Chaudière-Appalaches
- Société nationale de l'Estrie

== History ==
In 1947, nine of Quebec's SSJB (those of Sherbrooke, Trois-Rivières, Quebec City, Rimouski, Saint-Hyacinthe, Nicolet, Hull, Saint-Jean and Chicoutimi), formed the Fédération des Sociétés Saint-Jean-Baptiste du Québec during a congress in Sherbrooke. This happened not long after the start of diverging opinions among the members of the ephemeral federation (1945–1946), whose members counted all the SSJB of Quebec and Ontario. In spite of this failure, the SSJB of Quebec and Ontario continued to collaborate closely up until the 1960s.

The young Quebec federation initiated various actions and took part in the efforts for the development of Quebec which accelerated after World War II. The federation participated to the popular movement that led to the adoption of the fleurdelisé as Quebec's Flag in 1948, organized the National Conference on Education which led, in 1964, to the creation of a Quebec Ministry of Education, and helped with setting in motion the Estates General of French Canada.

In 1969, the federation's position was "in favour of the total political sovereignty of Quebec", affirming that sovereignty "is an essential condition for a methodical (orderly) development of the human, physical and economic resources of the Quebec community."

In 1972, influenced by the secularization movement that affected all of Quebec's institutions at the time, the federation changed their name to "Mouvement national des Québécois" (Quebecers' National Movement). Strongly committed against institutional bilingualism and for territorial unilingualism, the MNQ was active in the political movement that opposed the Act to promote the French language in Quebec (1969) and the Official Language Act (1974) and supported the Parti Québécois's (PQ) proposed interventionist policy.

The defeat of the sovereigntist option in the Quebec referendum of 1980 consequently left the MNQ disoriented. In 1982, its office closed and dissolving the federation was discussed.

In 1984, the SSJB's 150th anniversary, the government of Quebec entrusted the MNQ with the responsibility of coordinating Quebec's national holiday festivities.

In 1991, the MNQ changed their name to Mouvement national des Québécoises et des Québécois, but kept the acronym "MNQ". This change reflected the movement's support of feminism.

In 2007, the federation celebrated its 60th anniversary.

The MNQ leadership, along with the Bloc Québécois, impels the federal government of Canada to respect the Charter of the French Language and withdraw from the field of telecommunications as a consequence of the adoption of the motion recognizing that Quebecers form a nation within Canada by the House of Commons of Canada. It also supports PQ National Assembly member Daniel Turp's initiative to obtain a .qc country code for Quebec following the precedent of a .cat for Catalonia.
