= Official Language Act (Quebec) =

Act of Parliament of Quebec

National Assembly of Quebec
- Citation: SQ 1974, c. 6
- Enacted by: National Assembly of Quebec
- Royal assent: July 31, 1974
- Bill citation: Bill 22 (1974)

Repealed by
- Charter of the French Language, SQ 1977, c. C-11, s. 224
- Status: Repealed

The Official Language Act of 1974 (French: Loi sur la langue officielle), also known as Bill 22, was an act of the National Assembly of Quebec, commissioned by Premier Robert Bourassa, which made French the sole official language of Quebec, Canada. Provincial desire for the Official Language Act came after the repeal of Bill 63. It was ultimately supplanted by the Charter of the French Language (also known as Bill 101) in 1977, which imposed French as the only language for advertising and education (with many exceptions).

== Contents ==
The legislation was drafted in an attempt to follow the recommendations of the Commission of Inquiry on the Situation of the French Language and Linguistic Rights in Quebec. The act made French the official language in a number of areas:

- Language of services (had to be primarily offered in French)
- Language of commercial signing (the use of French was required)
- Language of labour relations and business (businesses wanting to deal with the state had to apply for francization programs, French had to be included in all labels and communications, and products and services needed French marketing materials).
- Language of instruction (English-language public school was restricted to children who had a "sufficient" knowledge of this language)
- Language of legislation and justice (priority was given to French texts in case of ambiguity).

== Opposition ==
That English was an official language in Quebec as well was declared on July 19, 1974, by McGill University law faculty's most expert counsellors, disputing Bill 22. The testifiers were Dean Frank R. Scott; John Peters Humphrey, the chief planner of the United Nations' Universal Declaration of Human Rights; Irwin Cotler; and four additional legal teachers:

Section 1, which provides that French is 'the official language of the province of Quebec,' is misleading in that it suggests that English is not also an official language in Quebec, which it is by virtue of Section 133 of the BNA Act and the federal Official Languages Act. ... No legislation in the National Assembly proclaiming French the sole official language in the province can affect these bilingual areas protected by the BNA Act.

John Ciaccia and George Springate were suspended from the Liberal caucus for almost two months in 1974 for voting with the Opposition when the Robert Bourassa government passed Bill 22.

== See also ==
- Official Languages Act of Canada
- Legal dispute over Quebec's language policy
- Office québécois de la langue française
- Quiet Revolution
- Language policy
