= Jean-Marie Cossette =

Canadian photographer

Jean-Marie Cossette (October 30, 1928 – April 28, 2007) was an aerial photographer, newspaper manager, and activist in the Canadian province of Quebec. He was a prominent member of the Quebec sovereigntist movement and was president of the Saint-Jean-Baptiste Society of Montreal on three occasions.

== Early life and career ==
Cossette was born in Saint-Roch-de-Mékinac in Quebec's Mauricie region, the son of a farmer. He became an aerial photographer in 1949 and worked in the field for many years, founding the companies Point du Jour Aviation and Globe Airview and working in Quebec, Ontario, and the United States of America. Cossette is regarded as a pioneer of aerial photography in Quebec, and Point du Jour's collection of more than four million aerial photographs taken between 1954 and 1996 is now held by the Bibliothèque et Archives nationales du Québec.

Cossette became associated with the Quebec independence movement when living in Montreal. During the 1970 October Crisis, he was detained without charge for a period of three weeks.

== Sovereigntist activist ==
Cossette served as president of Montreal's Saint-Jean-Baptiste Society on three occasions (1975–76, 1978–80, and 1985–86). His third tenure as president was unexpected; he was elected at the party's annual convention following the surprise resignation of Gilles Rhéaume. Cossette planned to run for the position again in 1992 against incumbent Jean Dorion, but was disqualified after he lost his position on the society's executive.

During the 1980 Canadian federal election, Cossette said that he would support any party that would pledge to abolish the War Measures Act and uphold the Keable Commission into police wrongdoing during the October Crisis.

Cossette was invited to a session of the Legislative Assembly of Ontario in 1980 during a special week-long debate on Canadian federalism and Quebec sovereignty (this debate occurred against the backdrop of the first Quebec referendum on sovereignty). In his comments, he said that he did not believe the claims of friendship and brotherhood for Quebecers that had been expressed by Ontario legislators. He was quoted as saying, "We simply hate each other traditionally, and it shows. You can hear it, you can feel it." These comments were criticized in The Globe and Mail newspaper.

In 1992, Cossette announced plans to organize a class-action lawsuit on behalf of people who were arrested during the 1970 October Crisis. In 2001, he received the Saint-Jean-Baptiste Society's Prix Patriote de l'année for his lifetime of work in support of the sovereigntist cause.

== Print media ==
Cossette was financial manager of Le Jour, a pro-sovereigntist tabloid newspaper, during its relaunch as a weekly between 1977 and 1978. He later served as director of a magazine called Ici Quebec. In 1978, the magazine faced criticism for printing a strongly anti-Zionist article; Cossette declined to criticize the piece, saying that the article was not anti-Semitic and that he did not wish to interfere with the paper's editorial content.

== Death ==
Cossette died at the Hôtel-Dieu de Montréal on April 30, 2007.
