= François-Albert Angers =

Québécois journalist (1909-2003)

François-Albert Angers (May 21, 1909 – July 14, 2003) was a Québécois economist, journalist, and Quebec nationalist.

Over the course of his career, Angers was editor in chief of various publications, including l'Action nationale, which he edited from 1943 to 1946 and again from 1959 to 1967. Angers edited the book Essai sur la centralisation (1960), which featured Professors Pierre Harvey and Jacques Parizeau, each of whom contributed a chapter on Keynesianism.

== See also ==
- List of presidents of the Saint-Jean-Baptiste Society of Montreal
- Quebec nationalism
