= Ministry of Justice (Quebec) =

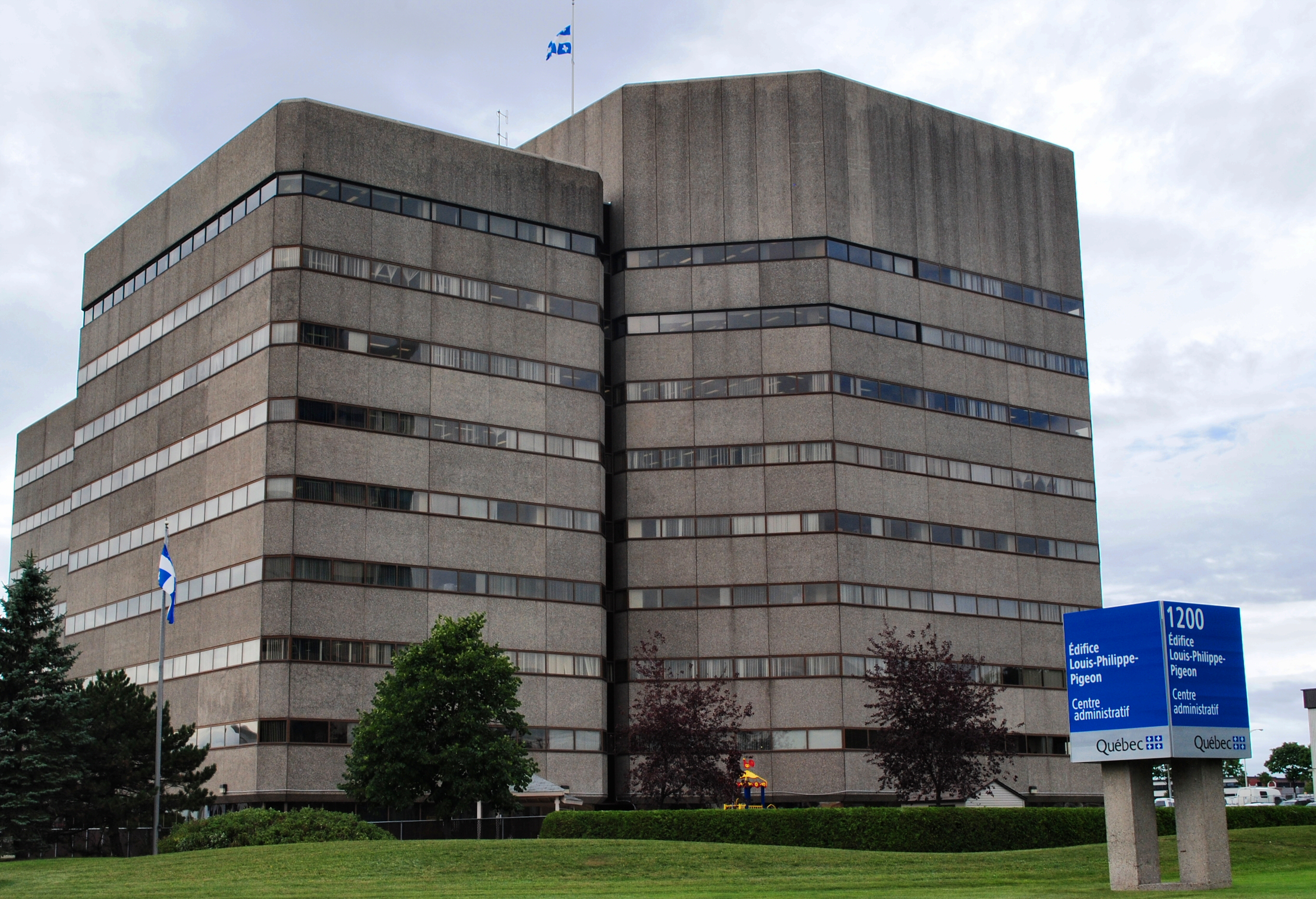
The Ministry of Justice Building in Quebec

The Ministry of Justice (French: Ministère de la Justice) is responsible for the administration of courts and prosecutors in Quebec, Canada. The Minister is automatically the Attorney General, and Registrar of Quebec.

The Ministry of Justice was created by the Department of Justice Act, which came into effect on June 4, 1965, making Quebec the first Canadian province to have a department of justice. The first Minister appointed under the new Act was Claude Wagner.

Prior to 1965, the senior justice official in the province was the Attorney General. This role was created in 1867 replacing the role of Attorney General of Canada East and before 1841 the Attorney General of Lower Canada.

In 1975, a working paper, La Justice Contemporaine, proposed a comprehensive vision of the justice system in Quebec, and recommended unification of the provincial trial courts The Court of Quebec was not established until 1988, after the merging of Provincial Court, the Court of the Sessions of the Peace and the Youth Court.

The current minister is Marie-Claude Sarrazin."Ministère de la Justice". Government of Québec (in French).

== See also ==
- List of ministers of justice of Quebec
- Directeur des poursuites criminelles et pénales
