= Comedy in Quebec =

Comedy is a vast cultural sector in Quebec, whose promotion and development are in part ensured by the Association des professionnels de l'industrie de l'humour (APIH).

The École nationale de l'humour, located in Montreal, is an institution that trains Quebec comedians.

The Gala Les Olivier rewards talented comedians.

== Comedy festivals ==
Quebec hosts many comedy festivals, including:

- Just for Laughs
- ComediHa! Fest-Québec
- Grand Montréal Comique
- Zoofest
- Festival d'humour d'Alma
- Festival d'Humour de l'Abitibi-Témiscamingue
- Festival d'Humour de Gatineau
- Festival de la Blague de Drummondville
- Festival MiniFest

== Features ==
Quebec humour has long been expressed through very popular periodicals entirely devoted to the genre, whether through literature, illustration or comics. Quebec's journals have their own cartoonists who publish humouristic comics.

== See also ==
- List of Quebec comedians
- Culture of Quebec
- Canadian humour
