= Directeur des poursuites criminelles et pénales =

Agency overview
- Jurisdiction: Government of Quebec
- Headquarters: 2828, boulevard Laurier; Tour 1, bureau 500 Quebec City, Quebec
- Minister responsible: Patrick Michel
- Parent department: Ministère de la Justice du Québec
- Website: www.quebec.ca/gouv/DPCP

The Directeur des poursuites criminelles et pénales ("Director of Criminal and Penal Prosecutions"), or DPCP, is a public body which authorizes and directs criminal and penal prosecutions on behalf of the State of Quebec. The DPCP exercises its powers independently from the government and other political authorities. Its work is also not influenced by political, economic, police, media or public pressure. This contributes to the protection of Quebec's society, while respecting the public interest and the legitimate interests of victims.

The DPCP prosecutes cases arising from infractions of the Criminal Code, the Youth Criminal Justice Act, the Code of Penal Procedure, and any other federal statute for which the Attorney General of Quebec can prosecute. The DPCP can also advises police forces in Quebec on all aspects of an investigation or prosecution in criminal and penal matters.

== In pop culture ==
The DPCP is present in the Quebec police show District 31, notably through the prosecutor Sonia Blanchard (played by Pascale Montpetit).

== See also ==
- Ministry of Justice (Quebec)
- List of ministers of justice of Quebec
