= Quebec law =

Overview of the law of Quebec

Quebec law separates private law (including civil) matters, which it handles in accord with French-heritage civil law. Public law (including criminal law) operates according to Canadian common law. Quebec is the only province to do so. Quebec law derives from four classic sources of law (legislation, case law, doctrine and customary law).

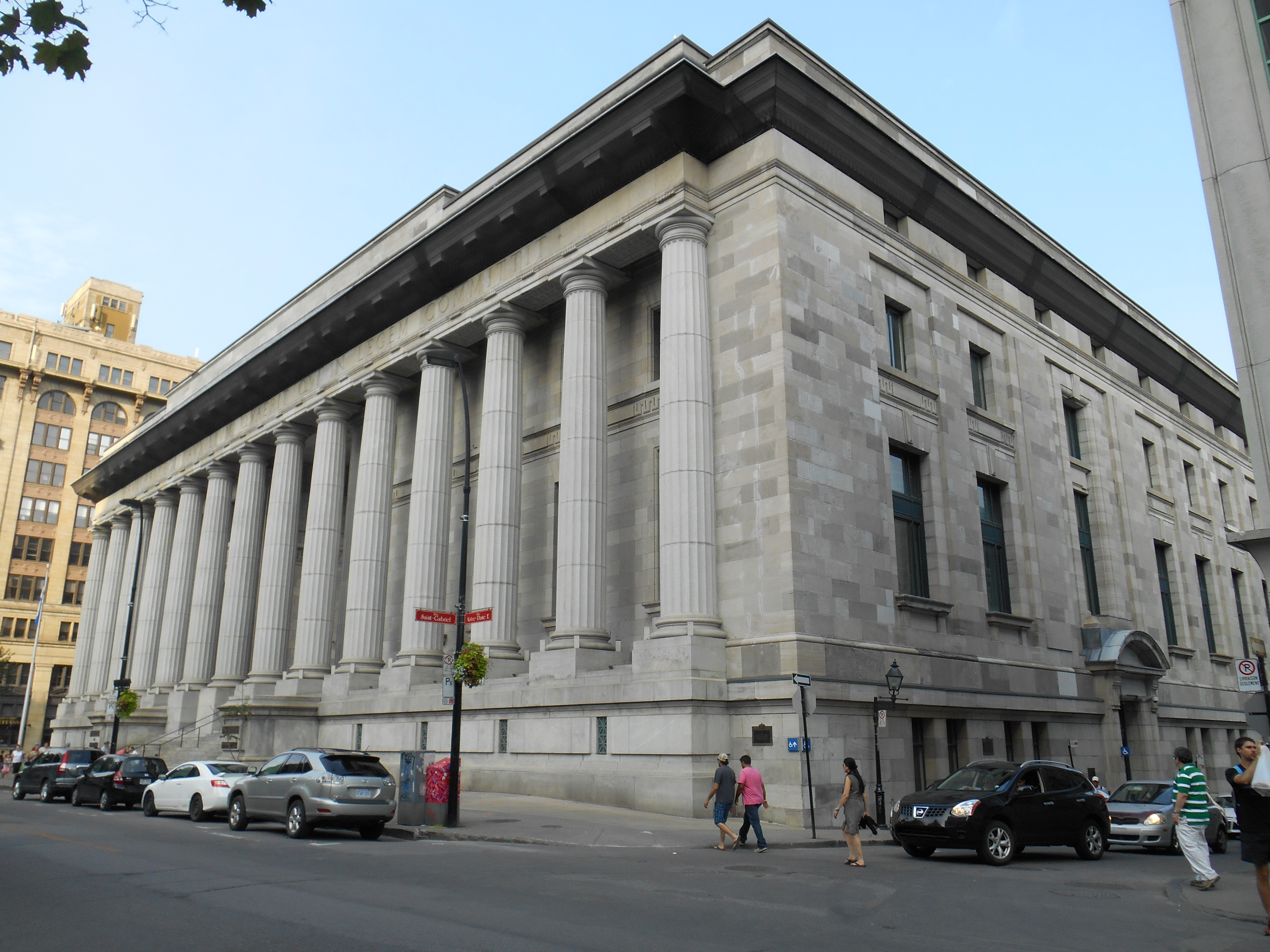
The Édifice Ernest-Cormier is the courthouse for the Quebec Court of Appeal in Montreal.

Quebec law is enacted and enforced by the federal and provincial governments. The Constitution of Canada makes the federal government responsible for criminal law, foreign affairs and commerce, interprovincial transport, and telecommunications. The provincial government is accordingly responsible for private law (including property, family law and contract law), the administration of justice, and social domains such as social assistance, healthcare, education, and natural resources. Jurisdiction is shared in areas such as immigration and agriculture.

Legislation is the primary source, but because private law is mostly exercised under the civil law tradition, case law is also a strong contributor. Law reflects the Constitution of Canada, laws enacted by the Quebec Legislature and rules related to legislating.

Quebec participates in Canada's multi-level appeals system and operates several levels of courts and administrative jurisprudence.

The Sûreté du Québec is the main police force, supplemented by municipal police forces in urban areas, the Royal Canadian Mounted Police and First Nations police.

Legal assistance is divided into advocates who appear in court and notaries that handle real estate, inheritance and other less contentious matters.

== History ==
Quebec's legal system was established when New France was founded in 1663. In 1664, Louis XIV decreed in the charter creating the French East India Company that French colonial law would primarily be based on the Custom of Paris, the civil law in force in the Paris region. Justice was administered according to the “Code Louis”, consisting of the 1667 ordinance on civil procedure and 1670 ordinance on criminal procedure. Trials were conducted under an inquisitorial system. The French law merchant was in force as regulated by the 1673 Code Savary.

In 1763, France ceded sovereignty over Quebec to Britain. The British Government then enacted the Royal Proclamation of 1763, which set out the principles for colonial governance. In particular, the Royal Proclamation provided that all courts in Quebec were to decide "... all Causes, as well Criminal as Civil, according to Law and Equity, and as near as may be agreeable to the Laws of England." This provision displaced Paris law for civil and criminal proceedings. However, in 1774, the British Parliament passed the Quebec Act, which re-instated the civil law legal system for private law in general and property law in particular.

The key provision of the Quebec Act was s. VIII, which provided that all disputes relating to "Property and Civil Rights" were to be decided by the former law of Quebec. This phrase was carried forward as s. 92(13) of the British North America Act, 1867. This section granted all the provinces, including Quebec, the exclusive power to legislate with respect to private law matters. While courts in the other provinces operate under common law traditions, Quebec courts operate under a civil law tradition. In areas of public law, however, Quebec courts operate, like other Canadian provinces and territories, under common law traditions.

Civil law and common law occasionally overlap or contradict each other. For instance, under section 91(26) of the British North America Act, 1867, marriage and divorce fall under federal jurisdiction. However, marriage ceremonies are solemnized according to the Civil Code of Quebec, while divorce proceedings may apply federal laws and regulations and common law concepts such as in loco parentis, which has no equivalent at civil law according to which only the biological or legally adoptive relationship with offspring are recognized. Criminal law is, however, based on the common law system and applied at the federal level.

== Languages ==
Both English and French are required by the Constitution Act, 1867 for the enactment of laws and regulations, and any person may use English or French in the National Assembly and the courts. The books and records of the National Assembly must be kept in both languages. First Nations' languages are generally not used in the legal system, although translation services are typically available.

== Public and private law ==
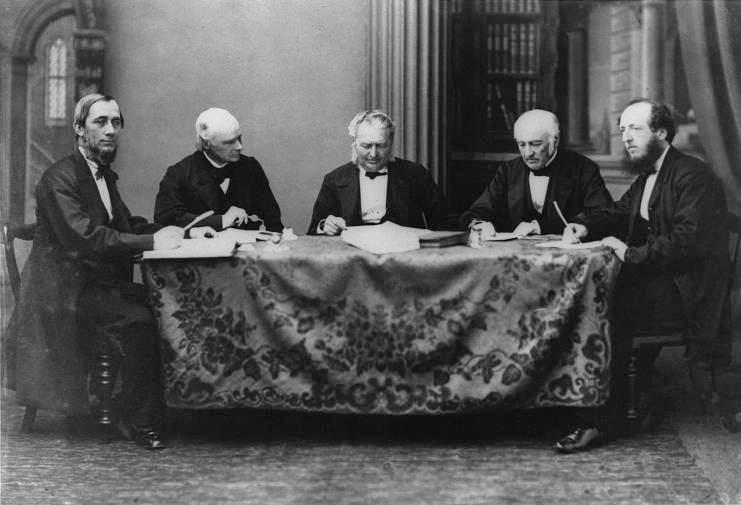
The 1865 commission with the mandate to codify the civil laws of Lower Canada.

Quebec laws fall into either private or public law. Private law concerns the relations between individuals, while public law deals with the rules that govern the Québécois government.

Private law in Quebec affects all relationships between individuals (natural or juridical persons) and is largely under the jurisdiction of the Parliament of Quebec. The Parliament of Canada also influences Quebec private law, in particular through its power over banks, bankruptcy, marriage, divorce and maritime law. The Droit civil du Québec is the primary component of Quebec's private law and is codified in the Civil Code of Quebec. The Civil Code of Quebec is the primary text delimiting jus commune in Quebec and includes the principles and rules of law governing legal persons, property law, family law, obligations, civil liability, conflict of laws, etc. For historical reasons, the Droit civil du Québec has been strongly influenced by the civil law of France.

Public law in Quebec is largely derived from the common law tradition. Quebec constitutional law governs the rules surrounding the Quebec government, the Parliament of Quebec and Quebec's courts. Quebec constitutional law is governed in large part by the Constitution of Canada, in particular by the Constitution Act, 1867, but also by various acts of the Parliament of Quebec. Quebec administrative law governs relations between individuals and the Quebec public administration. Quebec also has limited jurisdiction over criminal law. Quebec criminal law nevertheless includes a wide range of offences (road traffic safety (Code de la sécurité routière), Quebec labour law, etc.) Finally, Quebec, like the federal government, has tax law power.

Certain portions of Quebec law are considered mixed. This is the case, for example, with human rights and freedoms, which are governed by the Quebec Charter of Human Rights and Freedoms, a Charter which applies to both government and citizens.

== Civil Codes ==
=== Civil Code of Lower Canada ===
In 1866, the Parliament of the Province of Canada enacted the Civil Code of Lower Canada. This Civil Code applied only in Lower Canada, which a year later became the province of Quebec. The Code was comprehensive and covered all areas of private civil law. The Code was largely based on and inspired by the Napoleonic Code of 1804.

The Civil Code of Lower Canada consisted of four books:

- Persons
- Property and its Different Modifications
- Means of Acquiring and Owning Property
- Commercial Law

=== Civil Code of Quebec ===
In 1980, the province of Quebec enacted Civil Code of Quebec, dealing only with family law. This was an intermediary stage in the development of an entirely new civil code. The Legislature decided to enact this new Code because of the need for immediate reforms.

Quebec's current civil code, the Civil Code of Quebec, was the outcome of a lengthy review of the civil law, beginning with the establishment of the Civil Code Revision Office in 1955. The new code was enacted in 1991, and came into force in 1994. This Code repealed both the Civil Code of Lower Canada and the Civil Code of Quebec of 1980. It consists of ten books:

- Persons
- The Family
- Successions
- Property
- Obligations
- Prior Claims and Hypothecs
- Evidence
- Prescription
- Publication of Rights
- Private International Law

=== Civic values and social order ===
Quebec is a free and democratic society that abides by the rule of law. The Government of Quebec cites five statements that represent the key values of Québécois society:

- Quebec is a francophone society
- Quebec is a democratic society
- Women and men are equal
- Québécois have rights and responsibilities
- Quebec is a laïque society

Québécois society bases its cohesion and specificity on a set of statements, including:

- Quebec Charter of Human Rights and Freedoms
- Charter of the French Language
- Civil Code of Quebec

== Courts ==
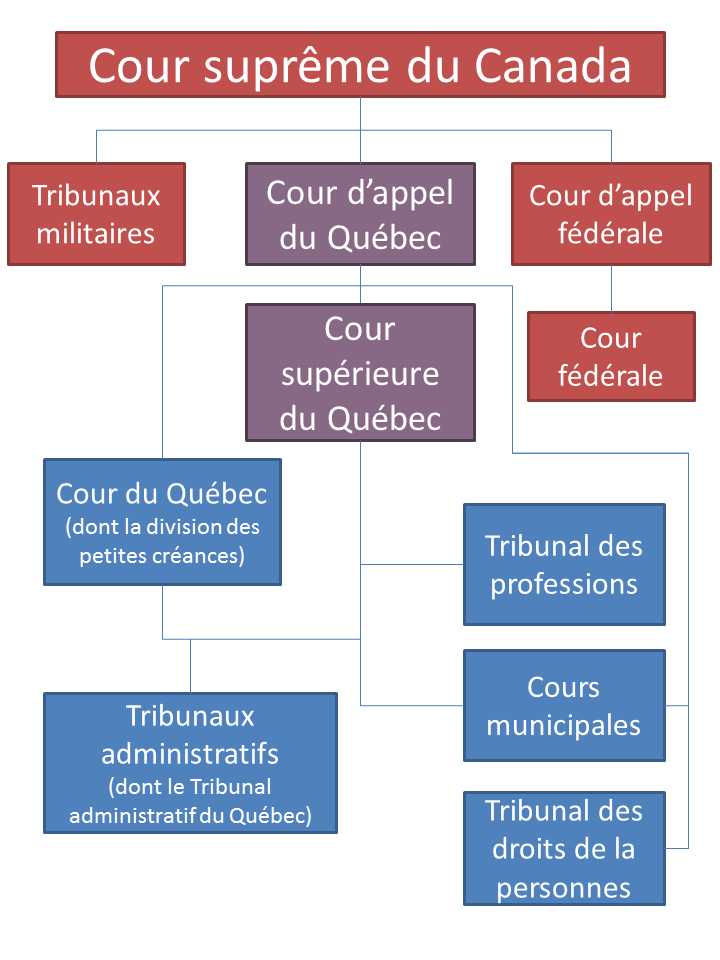
Court administration and appointment of judges under federal jurisdiction Court administration under Quebec jurisdiction, but judges appointed by the federal government Court administration and appointment of judges under Quebec jurisdiction

Although Quebec follows civil law, it does not match civil law systems that divide court systems by subject matter. Instead, the court system follows the English model of unitary courts of general jurisdiction.

All courts are protected by judicial independence. The courts have freedom to decide cases based on the law and the facts, without political interference.

In total, the Quebec judicial system has more than 500 judges. Nearly 300 of them work in the provincial courts, 25 at the Court of Appeal and nearly 200 at the Superior Court.

Quebec courts are organized as a pyramid.

=== Provincial Courts ===
Provincial courts adjudicate matters under provincial law and federal law, including civil, criminal and constitutional matters.

=== Lower Courts ===
At the bottom are the municipal courts, the Professions Tribunal, the Human Rights Tribunal, and administrative tribunals. Quebec has many administrative tribunals responsible for overseeing the application of one or more laws.

=== Court of Quebec ===
The Court of Quebec is the main criminal trial court, and also handles small civil claims. The Superior Court is a trial court of general jurisdiction, for both criminal and civil matters. The decisions of those courts can be appealed to the Quebec Court of Appeal.

It is a court of statutory jurisdiction, rather than of general jurisdiction. However, all but the most serious criminal cases are heard by the Court of Quebec. It has three chambers: the Youth Division, the Criminal and Penal Division, and the Civil Division.

The Civil Division includes the small claims division. The Court of Quebec once had exclusive jurisdiction over all civil matters with value under $85,000. The Supreme Court of Canada later held that it was unconstitutional to assign exclusive jurisdiction over such matters to the Court of Quebec and instead of the Superior Court.

=== Court of Appeal ===
The Court of Appeal is the general court of appeal for lower courts. It hears appeals from the Superior Court and the Quebec Court. It can hear appeals or review matters relating to the municipal courts and administrative tribunals. It also responds to reference questions posed to it by the Quebec Cabinet. The Court of Appeal typically renders more than 1,500 judgments per year.

=== Superior Court ===
The Superior Court can rule on all cases except those whose jurisdiction is assigned elsewhere. It has the power to hear certain civil claims under the Civil Code of Quebec, determine matters under family law, including under the federal Divorce Act, and hear class actions. It also hears appeals and judicial review applications from lower courts and administrative tribunals. The Superior Court is also a court of criminal jurisdiction under the federal Criminal Code. It is the trial court for the most serious criminal offences, and the appellate court from criminal decisions of the Quebec Court.

The municipal courts, the Human Rights Tribunal, and the Professions Tribunal are all trial courts. Their powers are limited to the powers that are given to them by the statute which created them.

=== Federal Courts ===
The Federal Court and Federal Court of Appeal have exclusive jurisdiction over some areas of federal law, such as review of federal administrative bodies, federal taxes, and matters relating to national security.

=== Supreme Court of Canada ===
Important cases may be appealed to the Supreme Court of Canada, the ultimate court of general appeal, with jurisdiction over all lower court legal issues.

=== First Nations ===
While most First Nations people are subject to the same laws and courts as other Québécois, some exceptions exist:

- Kahnawake operates a local court, It hears summary-conviction offences, contested traffic matters, and community laws, sitting roughly three dozen times a year. The Mohawk Council is moving toward community-appointed judges and a fuller Justice Act, including restorative processes.
- Akwesasne operates the Akwesasne Court under its own Court Law, outside the Indian Act framework. It adjudicates Akwesasne laws (property, sanitation, wildlife, elections, and similar matters) and has limited criminal jurisdiction.

=== Administration ===
The federal and provincial governments have legislative authority over court structure and court administration, but the core function of deciding cases is reserved to the courts.

The Parliament of Canada has legislative authority over federal courts, subject to judicial independence. The federal government pays the judges of those courts and provides the necessary administrative supports, such as court employees and courthouses. The federal government appoints and pays the judges of the Quebec Court of Appeal and the Superior Court, pays their salaries, and has exclusive power to remove them from office. The provincial government regulates court structure and administrative support.

main courts are the Court of Appeal, the Superior Court, and the Quebec Court.

== Lawyers ==
Quebec qualifies two distinct types of lawyers advocates and notaries. Statute forbids a lawyer from having a dual practice, i.e. an advocate cannot practice as a notary and vice versa.

Advocates must have a bachelor's degree in civil law, complete a clerkship, pass the professional bar course and be called to the Quebec bar. Five universities in Quebec and one in Ontario offer an undergraduate degree in civil law, including McGill University, University of Ottawa, and Université Laval.

Notaries are office lawyers who are restricted to non-contentious legal business such as real estate, law of inheritance, non-contentious family law, and company law. To practise as a notary, candidates must have a law degree, a 1-year master's degree in notarial law and be a member of the Quebec notaries’ society (Chambre des notaires du Québec).

== Law enforcement ==
The Sûreté du Québec is the main police force. It is responsible for the application of the law. The Sûreté also serve a support and coordination role with other police forces, such as municipal police forces or the Royal Canadian Mounted Police (RCMP).

The RCMP enforces certain federal laws. However, the existence of the Sûreté du Québec means that its role is more limited than in other provinces.

Municipal police, such as the Service de police de la Ville de Montréal and the Service de police de la Ville de Québec, are responsible for law enforcement in their municipalities. The Sûreté fulfils the role of municipal police in the 1038 municipalities lacking a municipal police force. Indigenous communities have their own police forces.

For offences against provincial or federal laws in Quebec (including the Criminal Code), the Director of Criminal and Penal Prosecutions (Director of Criminal and Penal Prosecutions) is responsible for prosecuting offenders through Crown attorneys. The Department of Justice of Canada has the power to prosecute offenders for offences against specific federal laws (ex. selling narcotics). Quebec operates the prison system for sentences of less than two years, while the federal government operates penitentiaries for longer sentences.

== See also ==
- Canadian Law
- Legal systems of the world

== Sources ==
- Brun, Henri; Tremblay, Guy; Brouillet, Eugénie (2008). Droit constitutionnel (5 ed.). Éditions Yvon Blais. OCLC 233522214.
- Émond, André; Lauzière, Lucie (2003). Introduction à l'étude du droit. Wilson & Lafleur. OCLC 52798925.
- Kélada, Henri (1970). Précis de droit québécois. Centre éducatif et culturel. OCLC 17462972.
- Levasseur, Alain A., J. Randall Trahan, & David W. Gruning, eds. The legal system of Québec. Durham, NC: Carolina Academic Press, 2021.
- Morin, Jacques-Yvan; Woehrling, José (1992). Les constitutions du Canada et du Québec: du régime français à nos jours. Tome premier. Études (PDF). Éditions Thémis.
- Tremblay, Guy; Le May, Denis (2009). Une grille d'analyse pour le droit du Québec. Montréal: Wilson & Lafleur. OCLC 312884195.
