= Quebec =

Province of Canada

Quebec Québec (French)
- Province
- Flag Coat of arms
- Motto(s): Je me souviens (French) 'I remember'
- Coordinates: 52°N 72°W
- Country: Canada
- Before confederation: Canada East
- Confederation: July 1, 1867 (1st, with New Brunswick, Nova Scotia, Ontario)
- Capital: Quebec City
- Largest city: Montreal
- Largest metro: Greater Montreal

Government
  - Type: Parliamentary constitutional monarchy
  - Lieutenant Governor: Manon Jeannotte
  - Premier: Paul Saint-Pierre Plamondon
- Legislature: National Assembly of Quebec
- Federal representation: Parliament of Canada
- House seats: 78 of 343 (22.7%)
- Senate seats: 24 of 105 (22.9%)

Area
  - Total: 1,542,057 km^{2} (595,392 sq mi)
  - Land: 1,365,129 km^{2} (527,079 sq mi)
  - Water: 176,928 km^{2} (68,312 sq mi) 11.5%
  - Rank: 2nd
- 15.4% of Canada

Population (2021)
  - Total: 8,501,840
  - Estimate (Q3 2026): 9,067,114
  - Rank: 2nd
  - Density: 6.5/km^{2} (17/sq mi)
- Demonym(s): in English: Quebecer, Quebecker, Québécois in French: Québécois (m), Québécoise (f)
- Official languages: French

GDP
  - Rank: 2nd
  - Total (2022): C$552.737 billion
  - Per capita: C$63,651 (9th)

HDI
  - HDI (2023): 0.945—Very high (2nd)

Time zones
- Most of province: UTC−05:00 (EST)
  - Summer (DST): UTC−04:00 (EDT)
- Blanc-Sablon and nearby areas: UTC-04:00 (AST)
- Magdalen Islands: UTC-04:00 (AST)
  - Summer (DST): UTC-03:00 (ADT)
- Canadian postal abbr.: QC
- ISO 3166 code: CA-QC
- Flower: Blue flag iris
- Tree: Yellow birch
- Bird: Snowy owl
- Website: quebec.ca
- Rankings include all provinces and territories

Quebec (Note: Pronunciation varies in English: /k(w)ɪˈbɛk/ k(w)ih-BEK, /kɛˈbɛk/ keh-BEK, /keɪˈbɛk/ kay-BEK.) (French: Québec) (Note: French pronunciation: [kebɛk]) is Canada's largest province by area. (Note: The territory of Nunavut is larger.) Located in Central Canada, it is the country's only Francophone-majority province. It is home to speakers of Québécois French. It shares borders with Ontario to the west, Newfoundland and Labrador to the northeast, New Brunswick to the southeast and a coastal border with the territory of Nunavut. To the south, it borders the United States. (Note: Quebec borders the states of Vermont, New York, New Hampshire and Maine.) Quebec has a population of around eight million, making it Canada's second-most populous province, behind Ontario.

Between 1534 and 1763, what became Quebec was the French colony of Canada and was the most developed colony in New France. Following the Seven Years' War, Canada became a British colony, first as the Province of Quebec (1763–1791), then Lower Canada (1791–1841), and lastly part of the Province of Canada (1841–1867) as a result of the Lower Canada Rebellion. It was confederated with Ontario, Nova Scotia, and New Brunswick in 1867. The Catholic Church played a large role in Quebec's social and cultural institutions until the Quiet Revolution of the 1960s to 1980s increased the role of the Government of Quebec in l'État québécois (the public authority of Quebec).

The Government of Quebec functions within the context of Canada's Westminster system and is both a liberal democracy and a constitutional monarchy. The Premier of Quebec is head of government. Independence debates have played a large role in Quebec politics. Quebec society's cohesion and specificity is based on three of its unique statutory documents: the Quebec Charter of Human Rights and Freedoms, the Charter of the French Language, and the Civil Code of Quebec. Furthermore, unlike the other provinces which use a common-law system, law in Quebec is mixed: private law is exercised under a civil law system, while public law is exercised under a common-law system.

The economy is mainly supported by its large service sector and varied industrial sector. Its exports are mainly aeronautics, hydroelectricity, mining, pharmaceuticals, aluminum, wood, and paper. Quebec is well known for producing maple syrup, for its comedy, and for making ice hockey one of Canada's most popular sports. The province's cultural products include literature, music, films, TV shows, and festivals.

== Etymology ==
The name Québec comes from an Algonquin word meaning 'narrow passage' or 'strait'. The name originally referred to the area around Quebec City where the Saint Lawrence River narrows. Early variations in the spelling included Québecq and Kébec. French explorer Samuel de Champlain chose the name Québec in 1608 for the colonial outpost he chose as the administrative seat for New France.

== History ==
Quebec was first settled by Paleo-Indians after the Laurentide Ice Sheet melted, roughly 11,000 years ago. They lived as nomads, surviving by hunting, fishing, and gathering. By the 1500s eleven First Nations peoples had formed: Inuit, Abenaki, Algonquin, Atikamekw, Cree, Huron-Wendat, Wolastoqiyik, Mi'kmaq, Haudenosaunee, Innu and Naskapi.

The first European explorers reached the area in the early 16th century. Giovanni da Verrazzano's 1522–23 voyage for France applied the name New France to northeastern North America. Jacques Cartier landed at Gaspé on July 24, 1534, and on his 1535 voyage named the Stadacona district Canada. From about 1580 the fur trade revived French interest. Coureurs des bois and Catholic missionaries followed, forming alliances with some Indigenous nations against others (the later Iroquois Wars).

Samuel de Champlain founded the Habitation de Québec (now Quebec City) on July 3, 1608, and it became the capital of New France. After a brief English occupation (1629–1632) it was returned by the Treaty of Saint-Germain-en-Laye. Maisonneuve founded Ville-Marie (now Montreal) in 1642. New France became a royal province in 1663. Relations with the Haudenosaunee and with Britain stayed turbulent through the Iroquois Wars and the Intercolonial Wars. British forces took Quebec City in 1759 and Montreal in 1760; France ceded the colony in the 1763 Treaty of Paris.

In 1791 Britain divided the Province of Quebec into Upper Canada and Lower Canada, giving Loyalist settlers English common law in the west while Lower Canada kept French civil law and the seigneurial system. Conflict continued into the Lower Canada Rebellion of 1837–38 and into disputes over representation. In 1867 the colony entered Confederation as the province of Quebec; the first premier was Pierre-Joseph-Olivier Chauveau. Montreal was Canada's largest city for the next century. The Catholic Church remained a central institution for French speakers; "O Canada" was written for the 1880 Saint-Jean-Baptiste celebrations.

In the early 20th century Quebec reached its present northern limits (Ungava, 1912), and the first statute requiring French in public life was adopted. In the First World War voluntary enlistment among French Quebecers was low; conscription in 1917 produced the Conscription Crisis of 1917 and riots in Quebec City. A second conscription crisis followed in 1944.

In the 1960s the Quiet Revolution under a Liberal government expanded the welfare state, reduced the Church's role in schools and social services, and nationalized electricity (Hydro-Québec). Québécois identity and Quebec nationalism became central politics. The Parti Québécois later took office and pressed for greater autonomy. Sovereignty referendums in 1980 and 1995 both failed to win a majority.

== Geography ==
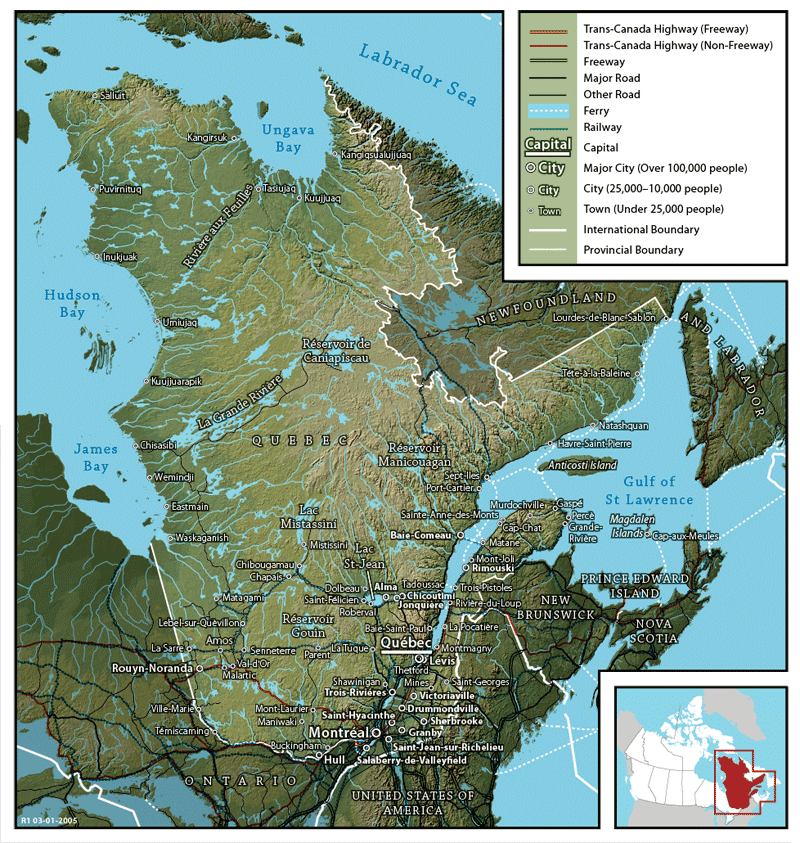
The Quebec territory.

Approximate areas of ecoregions: 1. Middle Arctic Tundra; 2. Low Arctic Tundra; 3. Torngat Mountain Tundra; 4. Eastern Canadian Shield Taiga; 5. Southern Hudson Bay Taiga; 6. Central Canadian Shield Forests; 7. Eastern Canadian Forests; 8. Eastern Forest/Boreal Transition; 9. Eastern Great Lakes Lowland Forests; 10. New England/Acadian Forests; 11. Gulf of St. Lawrence Lowland Forests

Located in the eastern part of Canada, Quebec occupies a territory nearly three times the size of France or Texas. It is much closer to the size of Alaska, covering 1.5 million square kilometres (0.58 million square miles), with borders more than 12,000 km (7,500 mi) long. It is the largest province in Canada and, by total area, the tenth-largest country subdivision in the world.

Most of Quebec is sparsely populated. Its most populous region is the Great Lakes–St. Lawrence Lowlands.

The combination of rich soils and the lowlands' relatively warm climate makes this valley its most prolific agricultural area. The rural landscape is divided into narrow rectangular tracts of land that extend from the river and date to the seigneurial system.

Quebec's topography is different from one region to another due to the varying composition of the ground, the climate, and the proximity to water. The Great Lakes–St. Lawrence Lowlands and the Appalachians are the two main topographic regions in southern Quebec, while the Canadian Shield occupies most of central and northern Quebec. 95% of the total, including the Labrador Peninsula, lies within the Canadian Shield. It is generally flat and exposed mountainous terrain interspersed with higher points such as the Laurentian Mountains in southern Quebec, the Otish Mountains in central Quebec and the Torngat Mountains near Ungava Bay. While low and medium altitude peaks extend from western Quebec to the far north, high altitude mountains appear in the Capitale-Nationale region to the east. Quebec's highest point at 1,652 metres (5,420 ft) is Mont d'Iberville, known in English as Mount Caubvick, in the northeastern part of the province in the Torngat Mountains. In the Labrador Peninsula portion of the Shield, the far northern region of Nunavik includes the Ungava Peninsula and consists of flat Arctic tundra inhabited mostly by Inuit.

Further south is the Eastern Canadian Shield taiga ecoregion and the Central Canadian Shield forests. The Appalachian region has a narrow strip of ancient mountains along the southeastern border of Quebec.

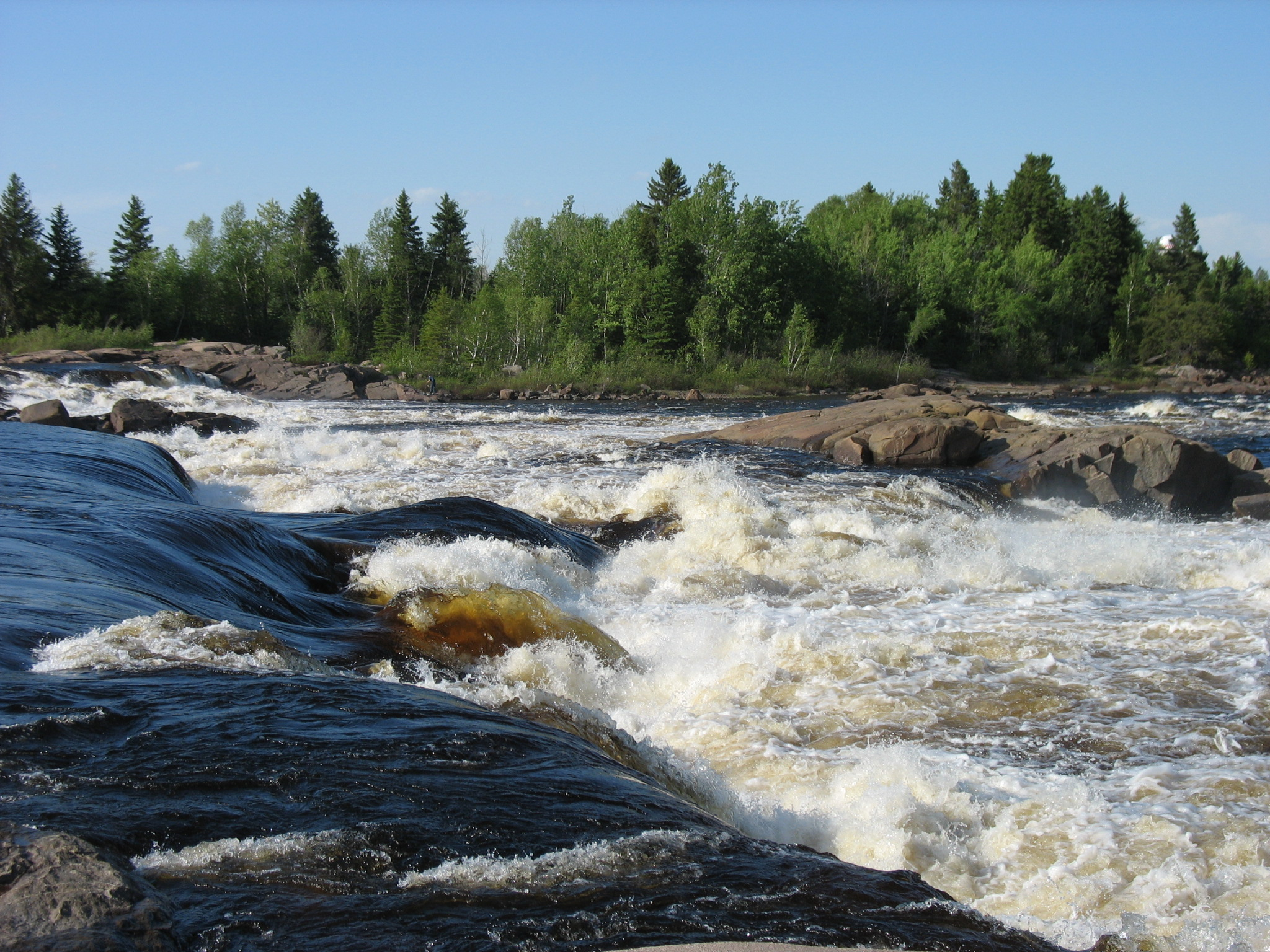
Michel's falls on Ashuapmushuan River in Saint-Félicien, Saguenay–Lac-Saint-Jean

Quebec has one of the world's largest reserves of fresh water, occupying 12% of its surface and representing 3% of the world's renewable fresh water. More than half a million lakes and 4,500 rivers empty into the Atlantic Ocean, through the Gulf of Saint Lawrence and the Arctic Ocean, by James, Hudson, and Ungava bays. The largest inland body of water is the Caniapiscau Reservoir; Lake Mistassini is the largest natural lake. The Saint Lawrence River has some of the world's largest sustaining inland Atlantic ports. Since 1959, the Saint Lawrence Seaway has provided a navigable link between the Atlantic Ocean and the Great Lakes.

The public lands of Quebec cover approximately 92% of its territory, including almost all of the water bodies. Protected areas can be classified into about twenty different legal designations (ex. exceptional forest ecosystem, protected marine environment, national park, biodiversity reserve, wildlife reserve, zone d'exploitation contrôlée (ZEC), etc.). More than 2,500 sites in Quebec today are protected areas. As of 2013, protected areas comprise 9.14% of Quebec's territory.

The ecological classification of Quebec territory established by the Ministry of Forests, Wildlife and Parks 2021, is presented in nine levels, it includes the diversity of terrestrial ecosystems throughout Quebec while taking into account both the characteristics of the vegetation (physiognomy, structure and composition) and the physical environment (relief, geology, geomorphology, hydrography).

The territory of Quebec is rich in resources in its coniferous forests, lakes, and rivers—pulp and paper, lumber, and hydroelectricity are some of the province's most important industries. The far north of the province, Nunavik, is subarctic or Arctic and is mostly inhabited by Inuit.

== Government ==
The Government of Quebec (French: gouvernement du Québec, pronounced [ɡuvɛʁnəmɑ̃ dy kebɛk]) is the body responsible for the administration of the Canadian province of Quebec. The term usually refers to the executive of the day (the premier and the other ministers of the Crown) and the non-partisan public service they direct. In French, the province’s official language, the name is Gouvernement du Québec.

Quebec is a constitutional monarchy and parliamentary democracy in the Westminster tradition. The premier is head of government The Conseil du trésor supports the ministers of the Executive Council. The sovereign, Charles III, King of Canada, is head of state and is represented in the province by the lieutenant governor. These institutions date from Quebec’s entry into Confederation in 1867.

Quebec's constitution enshrines social and cultural traditions reflected in judicial judgments and legislative documents, including the Loi sur l'Assemblée Nationale ("Law on the National Assembly"), the Loi sur l'éxecutif ("Law on the Executive"), and the Loi électorale du Québec ("Electoral Law of Quebec"). Other notable examples include the Charter of Human Rights and Freedoms, the Charter of the French language, and the Civil Code of Quebec.

Legislative power is held by the Parliament of Quebec, consisting of the Lieutenant Governor and the National Assembly.

Various ministries are responsible for matter such as education, welfare services, agriculture, and the environment.

The province has a variety of subdivisions, including administrative regions, territories, and municipalities.

== Law ==
Quebec law separates private law (including civil) matters, which it handles in accord with French-heritage civil law. Public law (including criminal law) operates according to Canadian common law. Quebec is the only province to do so. Quebec law derives from four classic sources of law (legislation, case law, doctrine and customary law).

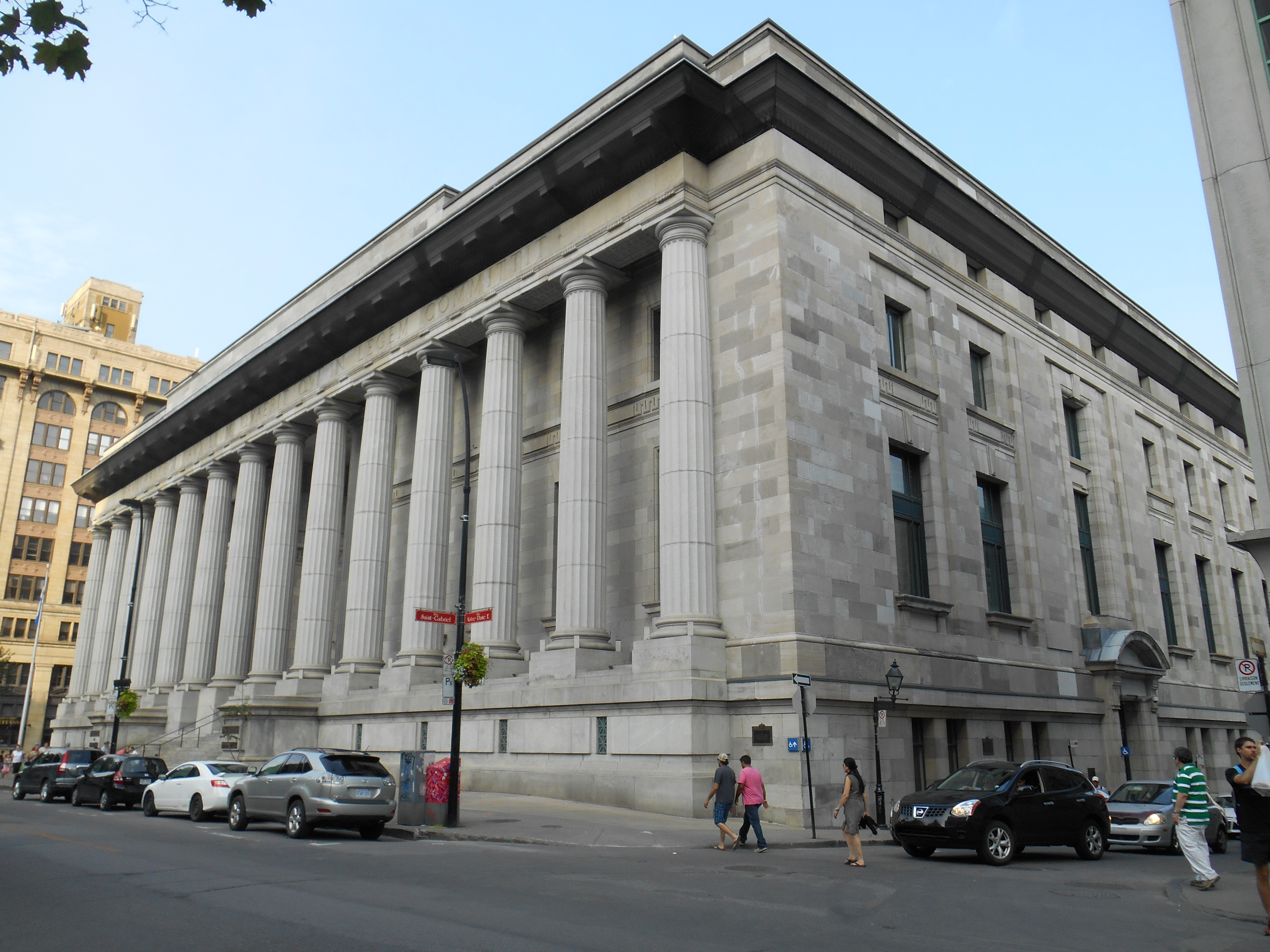
The Édifice Ernest-Cormier is the courthouse for the Quebec Court of Appeal in Montreal.

Quebec law is enacted and enforced by the federal and provincial governments. The Constitution of Canada makes the federal government responsible for criminal law, foreign affairs and commerce, interprovincial transport, and telecommunications. The provincial government is accordingly responsible for private law (including property, family law and contract law), the administration of justice, and social domains such as social assistance, healthcare, education, and natural resources. Jurisdiction is shared in areas such as immigration and agriculture.

Legislation is the primary source, but because private law is mostly exercised under the civil law tradition, case law is also a strong contributor. Law reflects the Constitution of Canada, laws enacted by the Quebec Legislature and rules related to legislating.

Quebec participates in Canada's multi-level appeals system and operates several levels of courts and administrative jurisprudence.

The Sûreté du Québec is the main police force, supplemented by municipal police forces in urban areas, the Royal Canadian Mounted Police and First Nations police.

Legal assistance is divided into advocates who appear in court and notaries that handle real estate, inheritance and other less contentious matters.

== Demographics ==
Population density map of Quebec

In the 2021 census, Quebec's population was determined to be 8,501,833, a 4.1% increase from its 2016 population of 8,164,361. With a land area of 1,356,625.27 km^{2} (523,795.95 sq mi), it had a population density of 6.0/km^{2} (15.6/sq mi) in 2016. Quebec accounted for a little under 23% of the Canadian population. The largest cities in Quebec are Montreal (1,762,976), Quebec City (538,738), Laval (431,208), and Gatineau (281,501).

In 2016, Quebec's median age was 41.2 years. As of 2020, 20.8% of the population was younger than 20, 59.5% was aged between 20 and 64, and 19.7% was 65 or older. In 2019, Quebec witnessed an increase in the number of births compared to the year before (84,200 vs 83,840) and had a total fertility rate of about 1.6 children born per woman. As of 2020, the average life expectancy was 82.3 years. Quebec in 2019 registered its highest rate of population growth since 1972, with an increase of 110,000 people, mostly because of the arrival of a high number of immigrants. As of 2019, most international immigrants were from China, India and France. In 2016, 30% of the population possessed a postsecondary degree or diploma. Most residents, particularly couples, are property owners. In 2016, 80% of both property owners and renters considered their housing to be "unaffordable". In the 2021 Canadian census, 29.3% of Quebec's population stated their ancestry was of Canadian origin and 21.1% stated their ancestry was of French origin. As of 2021, 18% of Quebec's population belonged to a visible minority group.

=== Religion ===
Religion in Quebec (2021 census)
1. Christianity (64.8%)
2. No religion (27.3%)
3. Islam (5.10%)
4. Judaism (1.00%)
5. Buddhism (0.60%)
6. Hinduism (0.60%)
7. Sikhism (0.30%)
8. Other / Not stated (0.30%)

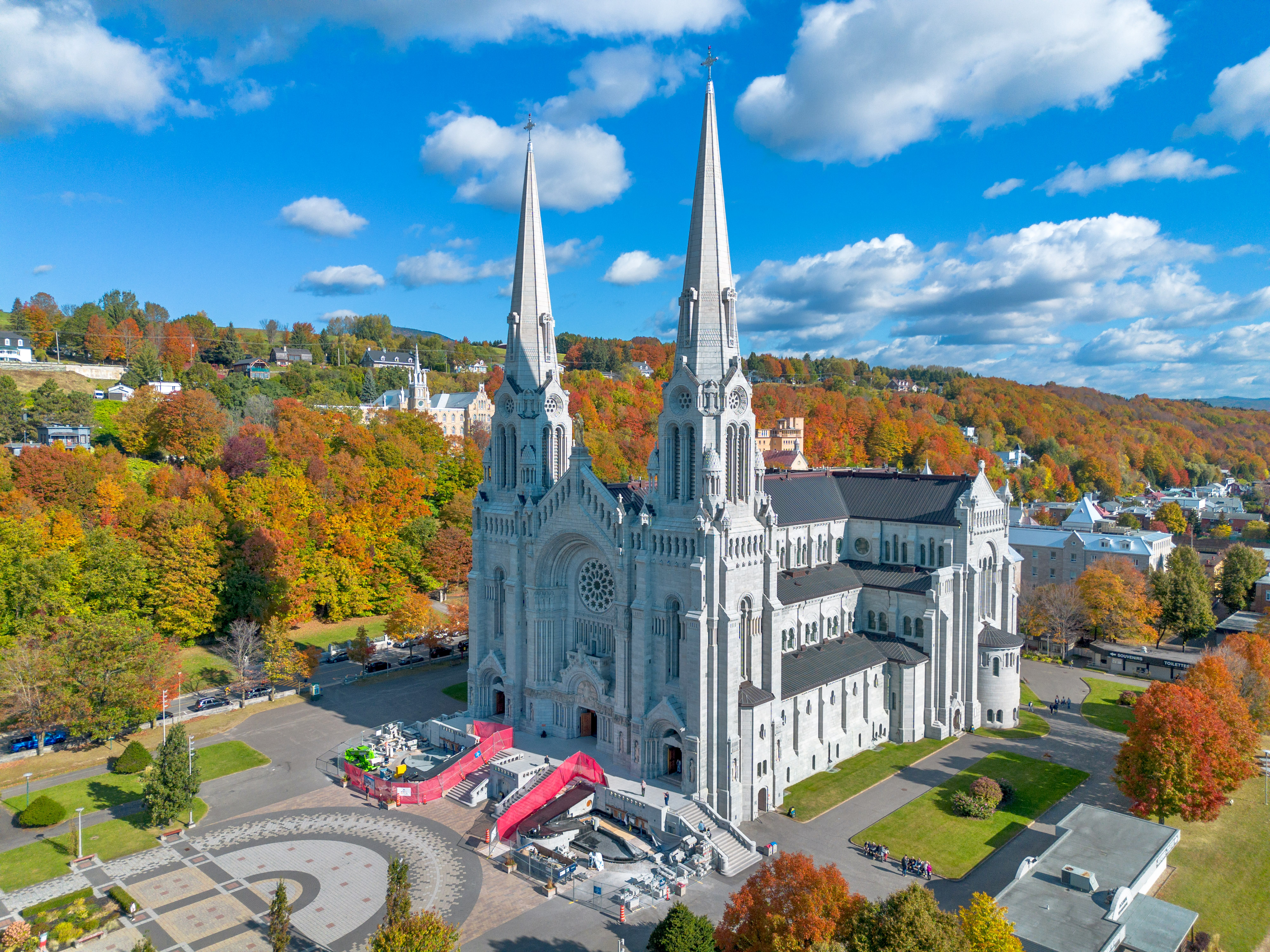
The Basilica of Sainte-Anne-de-Beaupré.

According to the 2021 census, the most commonly cited religions in Quebec were:

- Christianity (5,385,240 residents, or 64.8%)
- Irreligion (2,267,720 or 27.3%)
- Islam (421,710 or 5.1%)
- Judaism (84,530 or 1.0%)
- Buddhism (48,365 or 0.6%)
- Hinduism (47,390 or 0.6%)
- Sikhism (23,345 or 0.3%)
- Indigenous spirituality (3,790 or <0.1%)
- Other (26,385 or 0.3%)

The Roman Catholic Church has long occupied a central and integral place in Quebec society since the foundation of Quebec City in 1608. However, since the Quiet Revolution, which secularized Quebec, irreligion has been growing significantly. In 2025, there was a reported rise in adult baptisms and an increased number of baptisms of people over the age of 7. The Catholic Church of Quebec described the recent increase in baptisms among adults and adolescents as a "surprising phenomenon … gaining momentum" and that interest in Catholic baptism is "especially present" in young people and in adults from immigrant backgrounds. Later on Holy Saturday in 2026, it was reported that young people were joining the Catholic Church due to the presence of priests and young influencers on social media platforms such as TikTok and Instagram. Other reasons for young people joining the Catholic Church was reported to be due to taking an interest in Quebec's religious heritage so that they could "understand their identity."

Religions other than Christianity, Judaism and indigenous faiths were not present in Quebec before the 20th century. They started establishing a small presence following the passing of the Immigration Act of 1962. Islam in particular has grown rapidly since the 1990s due to high immigration levels. Its number of adherents increased from 44,930 (0.6% of the population) in 1991 to 421,715 (5.1%) in 2021.

The oldest parish church in North America is the Cathedral-Basilica of Notre-Dame de Québec. Its construction began in 1647, when it was known under the name Notre-Dame-de-la-Paix, and it was finished in 1664. The most frequented place of worship in Quebec is the Basilica of Sainte-Anne-de-Beaupré. This basilica welcomes millions of visitors each year. Saint Joseph's Oratory is the largest place of worship in the world dedicated to Saint Joseph. Many pilgrimages include places such as Saint Benedict Abbey, Sanctuaire Notre-Dame-du-Cap, Notre-Dame de Montréal Basilica, Marie-Reine-du-Monde de Montréal Basilica-Cathedral, Saint-Michel Basilica-Cathedral, and Saint-Patrick's Basilica. Another important place of worship in Quebec is the Anglican Holy Trinity Cathedral, which was erected between 1800 and 1804. It was the first Anglican cathedral built outside the British Isles.

=== Language ===
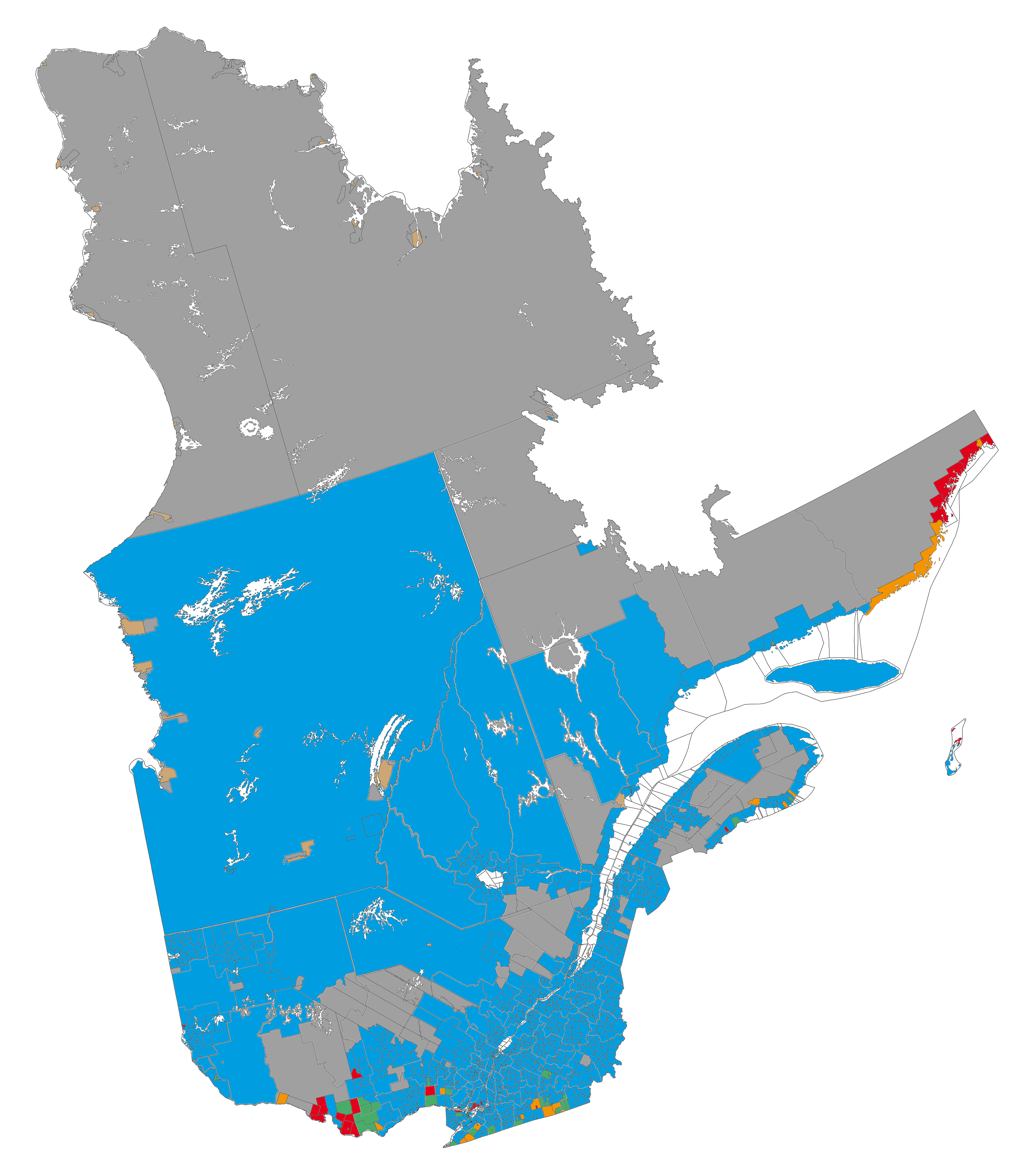
Linguistic map of the province of Quebec (source: Statistics Canada, 2006 census) Francophone majority, less than 33% Anglophone Francophone majority, more than 33% Anglophone Anglophone majority, more than 33% Francophone Anglophone majority, less than 33% Francophone Indigenous language majority Data not available

Quebec differs from other Canadian provinces in that French is its sole official language, while English predominates in the rest of Canada. French is the common language, understood and spoken by 93.7% of the population according to the 2021 census, and is the sole native language of 74.8% of the population (or slightly more than 6.5 million residents) and a native language (alone or in combination with others) of 77.8%. This makes Quebec the only Canadian province whose population is mainly Francophone. Quebec French is the umbrella term for local variants of the language. Canada is estimated to be home to roughly 30 regional French accents, 17 of which can be found in Quebec. 42.2% of Quebec's population with a French mother tongue can converse in English, the predominant language of the rest of Canada.

The Office québécois de la langue française oversees the application of linguistic policies respecting French on the territory, jointly with the Superior Council of the French Language and the Commission de toponymie du Québec. The foundation for these linguistic policies was created in 1968 by the Gendron Commission and they have been accompanied the Charter of the French language ("Bill 101") since 1977. The policies are in effect to protect Quebec from being assimilated by its English-speaking neighbours (the rest of Canada and the United States) and were also created to rectify historical injustice between the Francophone majority and Anglophone minority, the latter of which were favoured since Quebec was a colony of the British Empire. Quebec remains, alongside Haiti, the only major Francophone dominant regions in the Americas.

Anglo-Quebecers, a name for residents whose main language is English, constitute the second largest linguistic group in Quebec. In 2021, English was the sole mother tongue of 7.6% of Quebec residents, and was a native language (alone or in combination with others) of 10.0%. Anglo-Quebecers reside mainly in the west of the island of Montreal (West Island), downtown Montreal and the Pontiac.

Three families of Indigenous languages encompassing eleven languages exist in Quebec: the Algonquian language family (Abenaki, Algonquin, Maliseet-passamaquoddy, Mi'kmaq, and the linguistic continuum of Atikamekw, Cree, Innu-aimun, and Naskapi), the Inuit–Aleut language family (Nunavimmiutitut, an Inuktitut dialect spoken by the Inuit of Nord-du-Québec), and the Iroquoian language family (Mohawk and Wendat). In the 2016 census, 50,895 people said they knew at least one Indigenous language and 45,570 people declared having an Indigenous language as their mother tongue. In Quebec, most Indigenous languages are transmitted quite well from one generation to the next with a mother tongue retention rate of 92%.

As of the 2016 census, the most common immigrant languages claimed as a native language were Arabic (2.5% of the total population), Spanish (1.9%), Italian (1.4%), Creole languages (mainly Haitian Creole) (0.8%), and Mandarin (0.6%).

As of the 2021 Canadian census, the ten most spoken languages in the province were French (spoken by 7,786,735 people, or 93.72% of the population), English (4,317,180 or 51.96%), Spanish (453,905 or 5.46%), Arabic (343,675 or 4.14%), Italian (168,040 or 2.02%), Haitian Creole (118,010 or 1.42%), Mandarin (80,520 or 0.97%), Portuguese (65,605 or 0.8%), Russian (55,485 or 0.7%), and Greek (50,375 or 0.6%). The question on knowledge of languages allows for multiple responses.

=== Indigenous peoples ===
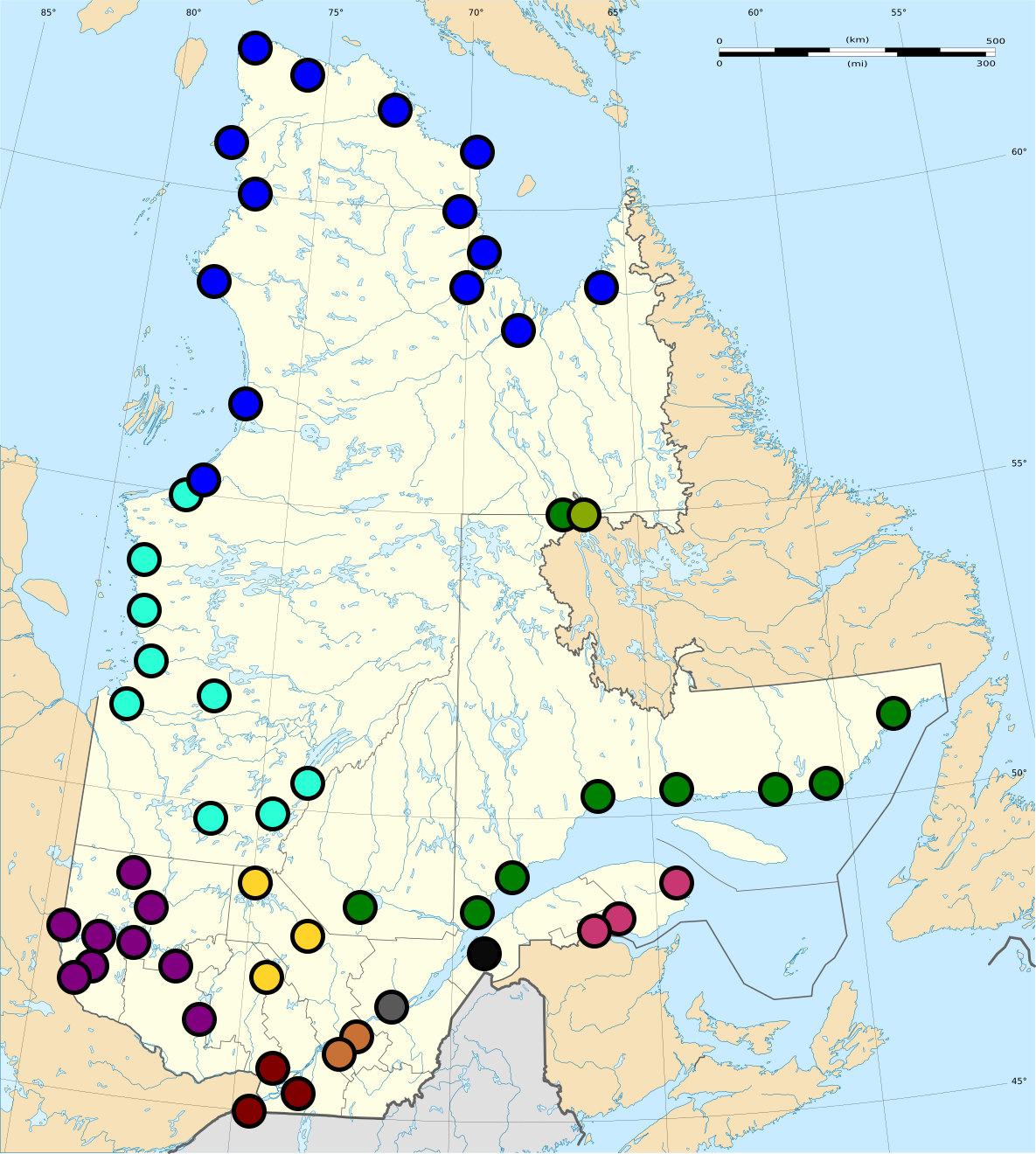
Map of aboriginal communities in Quebec, this includes reserves, settlements and northern villages: Algonquin Attikameks Abenaki Cree Wendat Innu Wolastoqiyik Mi'kmaq Mohawk Naskapi Inuit

In 2021, the Indigenous population of Quebec numbered 205,010 (2.5% of the population), including 15,800 Inuit, 116,550 First Nations people, and 61,010 Métis. There is an undercount, as some Indian bands regularly refuse to participate in Canadian censuses. In 2016, the Mohawk reserves of Kahnawake and Doncaster 17 along with the Indian settlement of Kanesatake and Lac-Rapide, a reserve of the Algonquins of Barriere Lake, were not counted.

The Inuit of Quebec live mainly in Nunavik in Nord-du-Québec. They make up the majority of the population living north of the 55th parallel. There are ten First Nations ethnic groups in Quebec: the Abenaki, the Algonquin, the Attikamek, the Cree, the Wolastoqiyik, the Mi'kmaq, the Innu, the Naskapi, the Wendat and the Mohawk. The Mohawks are traditionally part of the Haudenosaunee Confederacy. Aboriginal rights were enunciated in the Indian Act and adopted at the end of the 19th century. This act confines First Nations within the reserves created for them. The Indian Act is still in effect today. In 1975, the Cree, Inuit and the Quebec government agreed to an agreement called the James Bay and Northern Quebec Agreement that would extended indigenous rights beyond reserves, and to over two-thirds of Quebec's territory. Because this extension was enacted without the participation of the federal government, the extended indigenous rights only exist in Quebec. In 1978, the Naskapis joined the agreement when the Northeastern Quebec Agreement was signed. Discussions have been underway with the Innu of the Côte-Nord and Saguenay–Lac-Saint-Jean for the potential creation of a similar autonomy in two new distinct territories that would be called Innu Assi and Nitassinan.

A few political institutions have also been created over time:

- The Assembly of First Nations Quebec-Labrador
- The Grand Council of the Crees
- The Makivik Corporation

=== Acadians ===
The subject of Acadians in Quebec is an important one as more than a million people in Quebec are of Acadian descent, with roughly 4.8 million people possessing one or multiple Acadian ancestors in their genealogy tree, because a large number of Acadians had fled Acadia to take refuge in Quebec during the Great Upheaval. Furthermore, more than a million people have a patronym of Acadian origin.

Quebec houses Acadian communities. Acadians mainly live on the Magdalen Islands and in Gaspesia, but about thirty other communities are present elsewhere in Quebec, mostly in the Côte-Nord and Centre-du-Québec regions. An Acadian community in Quebec can be called a "Cadie", "Petite Cadie" or "Cadien".

== Economy ==
Quebec has an advanced, market-based, and open economy. In 2022, its gross domestic product (GDP) was US$50,000 per person at purchasing power parity. The economy of Quebec is the 46th largest in the world behind Chile and 29th for GDP per person. Quebec represents 19% of the GDP of Canada. The provincial debt-to-GDP ratio peaked at 51% in 2012–2013, and declined to 43% in 2021.

Like most industrialized countries, the economy is based mainly on the services sector. Quebec's economy has traditionally been fuelled by abundant natural resources and a well-developed infrastructure, but has undergone significant change over the past decade. Firmly grounded in the knowledge economy, Quebec has one of the highest growth rates of GDP in Canada. The knowledge sector represents about 31% of Quebec's GDP. In 2011, Quebec experienced faster growth of its research-and-development (R&D) spending than other Canadian provinces. Quebec's spending in R&D in 2011 was equal to 2.63% of GDP, above the European Union average of 1.8%. The percentage spent on research and technology is the highest in Canada and higher than the averages for the Organisation for Economic Co-operation and Development and the G7 countries.

Some of the most important companies from Quebec are: Bombardier, Desjardins, the National Bank of Canada, the Jean Coutu Group, Transcontinental média, Quebecor, the Métro Inc. food retailers, Hydro-Québec, the Société des alcools du Québec, the Bank of Montreal, Saputo, the Cirque du Soleil, the Caisse de dépôt et placement du Québec, the Normandin restaurants, and Vidéotron.

=== Exports and imports ===
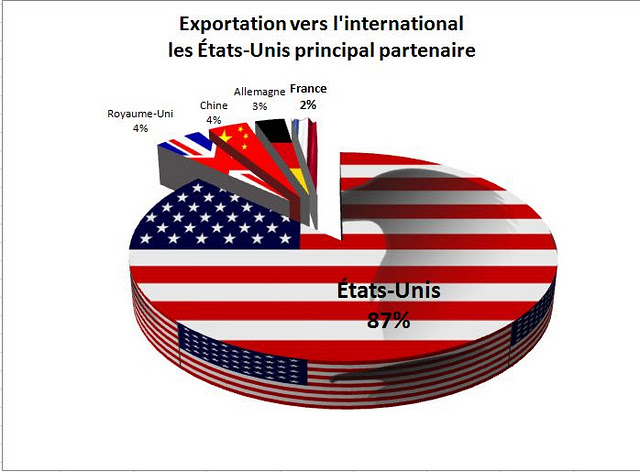
Quebec's exports to the international market. The United States is the country which buys the most exports from Quebec by far. (2011)

Thanks to the World Trade Organization (WTO) and the North American Free Trade Agreement (NAFTA), Quebec had, as of 2009, experienced an increase in its exports and in its ability to compete on the international market. International exchanges contribute to the strength of the Quebec economy. NAFTA is especially advantageous as it gives Quebec, among other things, access to a market of 130 million consumers within a radius of 1,000 kilometres.

In 2008, Quebec's exports to other provinces in Canada and abroad totalled 157.3 billion CND$, or 51.8% of Quebec's gross domestic product (GDP). Of this total, 60.4% were international exports, and 39.6% were interprovincial exports. The breakdown by destination of international merchandise exports is: United States (72.2%), Europe (14.4%), Asia (5.1%), Middle East (2.7%), Central America (2.3%), South America (1.9%), Africa (0.8%) and Oceania (0.7%).

In 2008, Quebec imported $178 billion worth of goods and services, or 58.6% of its GDP. Of this total, 62.9% of goods were imported from international markets, while 37.1% of goods were interprovincial imports. The breakdown by origin of international merchandise imports is as follows: United States (31.1%), Europe (28.7%), Asia (17.1%), Africa (11.7%), South America (4.5%), Central America (3.7%), Middle East (1.3%) and Oceania (0.7%).

=== Primary sector ===
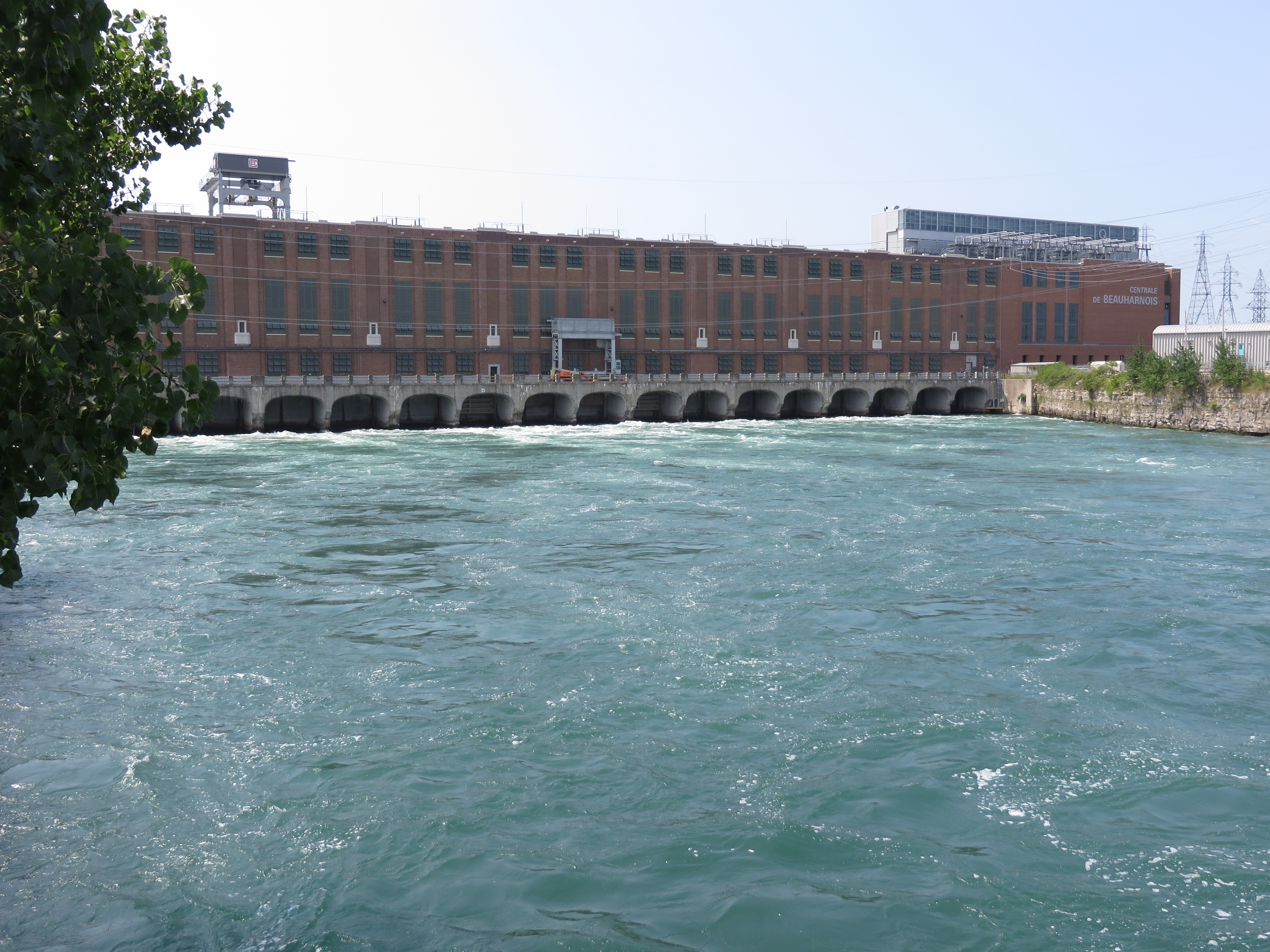
The Beauharnois generating station, operated by Hydro-Québec

Quebec produces most of Canada's hydroelectricity and is the second biggest hydroelectricity producer in the world (2019). Because of this, Quebec has been described as a potential clean energy superpower. In 2019, Quebec's electricity production amounted to 214 terawatt-hours (TWh), 95% of which comes from hydroelectric power stations, and 4.7% of which come from wind energy. The public company Hydro-Québec occupies a dominant position in the production, transmission and distribution of electricity in Quebec. Hydro-Québec operates 63 hydroelectric power stations and 28 large reservoirs. Because of the remoteness of Hydro-Québec's TransÉnergie division, it operates the largest electricity transmission network in North America. Quebec stands out for its use of renewable energy. In 2008, electricity ranked as the main form of energy used in Quebec (41.6%), followed by oil (38.2%) and natural gas (10.7%). In 2017, 47% of all energy came from renewable sources. The Quebec government's energy policy seeks to build, by 2030, a low carbon economy.

In 2011, the mining industry accounted for 6.3% of Quebec's GDP and it employed about 50,000 people in 158 companies. It has around 30 mines, 158 exploration companies and 15 primary processing industries. While many metallic and industrial minerals are exploited, the main ones are gold, iron, copper and zinc. Others include: titanium, asbestos, silver, magnesium and nickel, among many others. Quebec is also as a major source of diamonds. Since 2002, Quebec has seen an increase in its mineral explorations. In 2003, the value of mineral exploitation reached $3.7 billion.

The agri-food industry plays an important role in the economy of Quebec, with meat and dairy products being the two main sectors. It accounts for 8% of the Quebec's GDP and generate $19.2 billion. In 2010, this industry generated 487,000 jobs in agriculture, fisheries, manufacturing of food, beverages and tobacco and food distribution.

=== Secondary sector ===
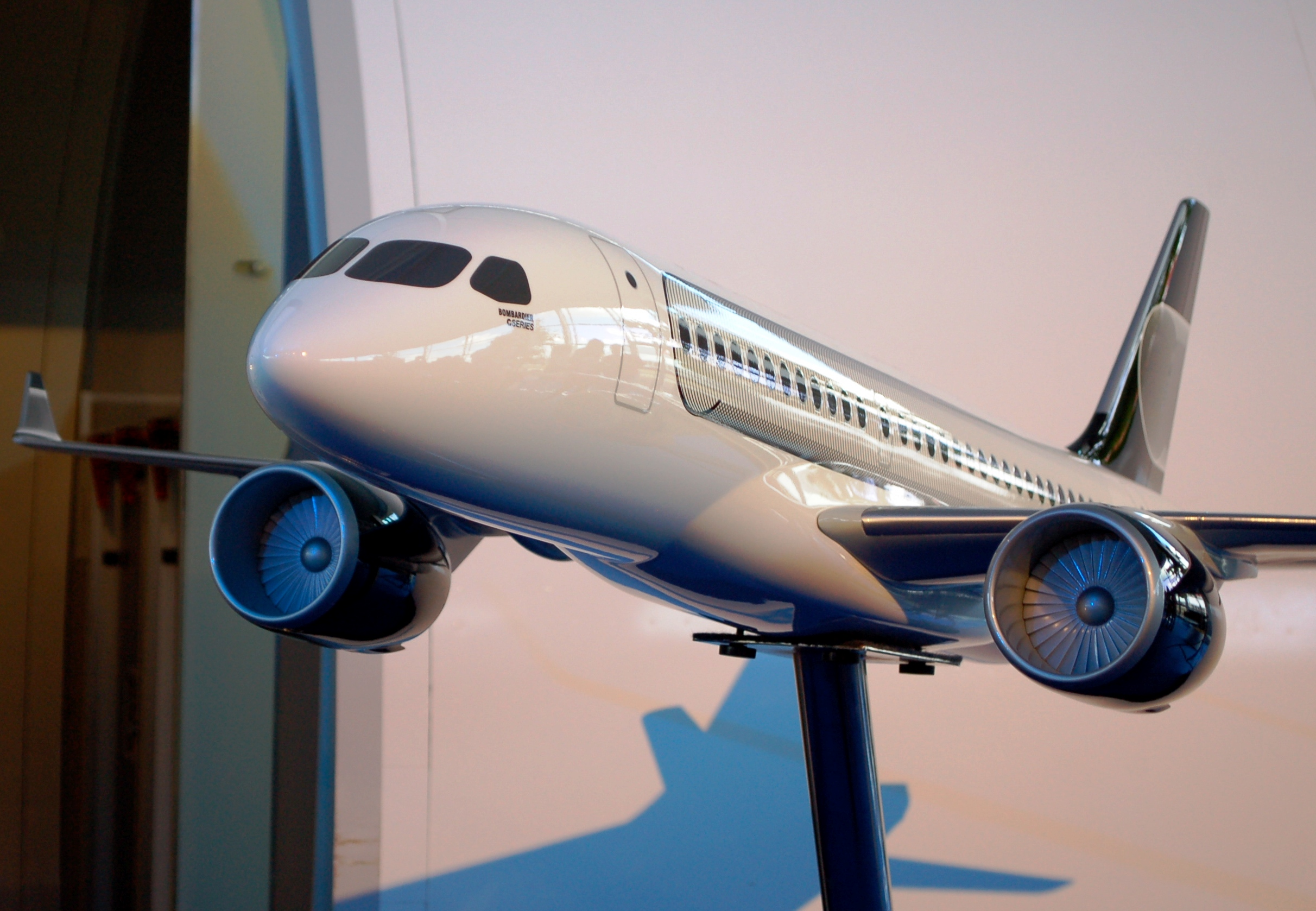
A mockup of the Airbus A220 (formerly the Bombardier CSeries), originally developed by Bombardier Aerospace

In 2021, Quebec's aerospace industry employed 35,000 people and its sales totalled C$15.2 billion – the world's 6th largest. Many aerospace companies are active in the country, including CMC Electronics, Bombardier, Pratt & Whitney Canada, Héroux-Devtek, Rolls-Royce, General Electric, Bell Textron, L3Harris, Safran, SONACA, CAE Inc., and Airbus, among others. Montreal is globally considered one of the aerospace industry's great centres, and several international aviation organisations seat here. Both Aéro Montréal and the CRIAQ were created to assist aerospace companies.

The pulp and paper industry accounted for 3.1% of Quebec's GDP in 2007 and generated annual shipments valued at more than $14 billion. This industry employs 68,000 people in several regions of Quebec. It is also the main—and in some circumstances only—source of manufacturing activity in more than 250 municipalities in the province. The forest industry has slowed in recent years because of the softwood lumber dispute. In 2020, this industry represented 8% of Quebec's exports.

As Quebec has few significant deposits of fossil fuels, all hydrocarbons are imported. Refiners' sourcing strategies have varied over time and have depended on market conditions. In the 1990s, Quebec purchased much of its oil from the North Sea. Since 2015, it now consumes almost exclusively the crude produced in western Canada and the United States. Quebec's two active refineries have a total capacity of 402,000 barrels per day, greater than local needs which stood at 365,000 barrels per day in 2018.

By virtue of hydroelectricity, Quebec is the world's fourth largest aluminum producer and creates 90% of Canadian aluminum. Three companies make aluminum here: Rio Tinto, Alcoa and Aluminium Alouette. Their 9 alumineries produce 2,9 million tons of aluminum annually and employ 30,000 workers.

=== Tertiary sector ===
The finance and insurance sector employs more than 168,000 people. Of this number, 78,000 are employed by the banking sector, 53,000 by the insurance sector and 20,000 by the securities and investment sector. The Bank of Montreal, founded in 1817 in Montreal, was Quebec's first bank but, like many other large banks, its central branch is now in Toronto. Several banks remain based in Quebec National Bank of Canada, the Desjardins Group and the Laurentian Bank.

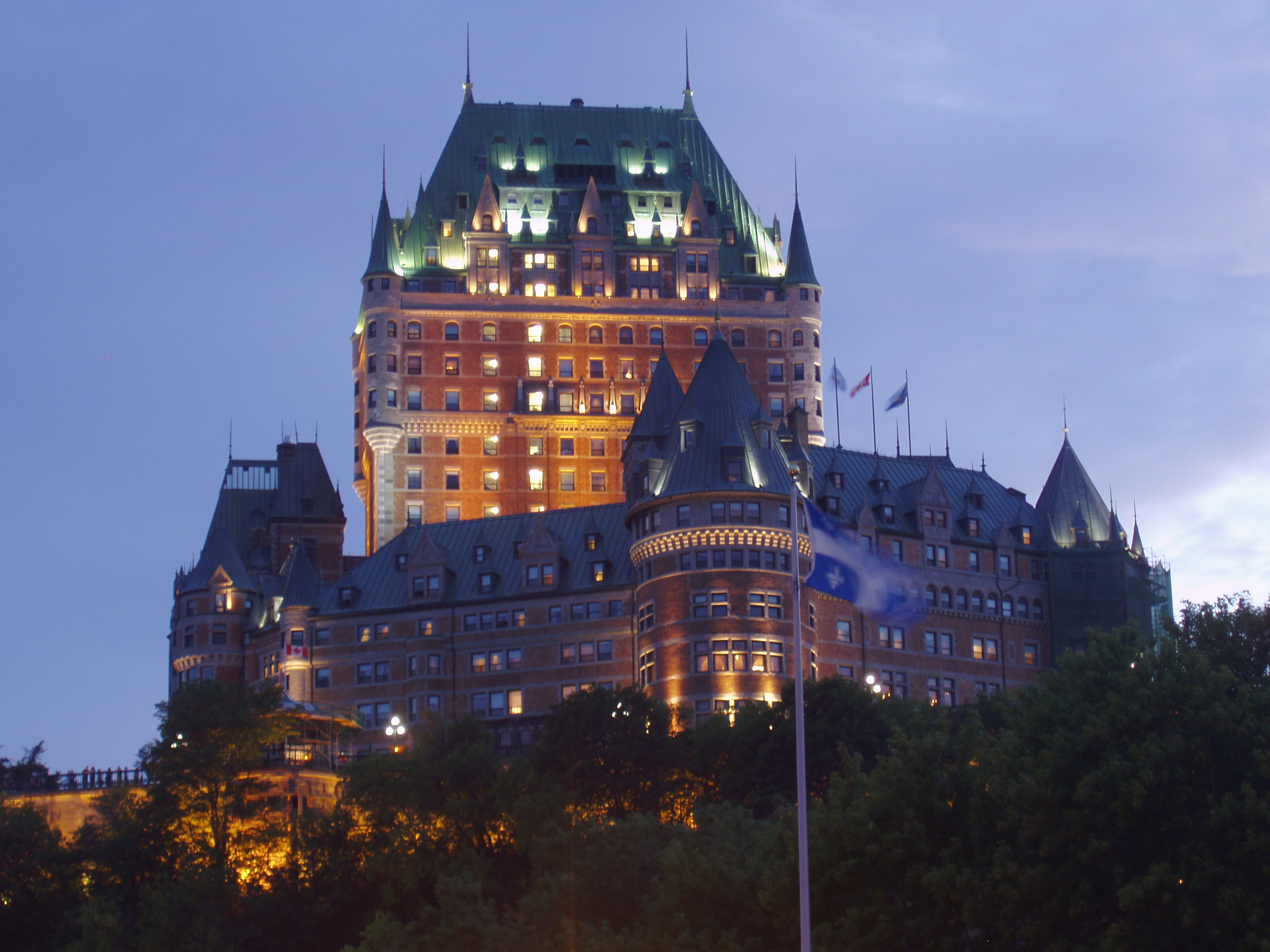
The Château Frontenac is the most photographed hotel in the world.

The tourism industry is a major sector in Quebec. The Ministry of Tourism ensures the development of this industry under the commercial name "Bonjour Québec". Quebec is the second most important province for tourism in Canada, receiving 21.5% of tourists' spending (2021). The industry provides employment to over 400,000 people. These employees work in the more than 29,000 tourism-related businesses in Quebec, most of which are restaurants or hotels. 70% of tourism-related businesses are located in or close to Montreal or Quebec City. It is estimated that, in 2010, Quebec welcomed 25.8 million tourists. Of these, 76.1% came from Quebec, 12.2% from the rest of Canada, 7.7% from the United States and 4.1% from other countries. Annually, tourists spend more than $6.7 billion in Quebec's tourism industry.

Approximately 1.1 million Quebecers work in the field of science and technology. In 2007, the Government of Quebec launched the Stratégie québécoise de la recherche et de l'innovation (SQRI) aiming to promote development through research, science and technology. The government hoped to create a strong culture of innovation in Quebec for the next decades and to create a sustainable economy.

Quebec's IT sector has 7,600 businesses and employs 140,000 people. Its most developed sectors are telecommunications, multimedia and video game software, computer services, microelectronics, and the components sector. There are currently 115 telecommunications companies established in the province, including Motorola, Ericsson and Mitec. The multimedia and video game sector has been growing fast since the early 2000s. The Digital Alliance, which claims 191 active members in video games, online education, mobility and Internet services, estimates the annual revenue of the sector at $827 million in 2014. The microelectronics sector is made up of more than 100 companies employing 13,000 people. Computer services, software development, and consulting engineering employ 60,000 skilled workers. While the largest IT employers are CMC Electronics, IBM, and Matrox, many other tech companies are present here, including Ubisoft, Electronic Arts, Microids, Strategy First, Eidos, Activision, A2M, Frima Studio, etc.

Montreal is ranked fourth in North America for the number of jobs in the pharmaceutical sector.

== Education ==
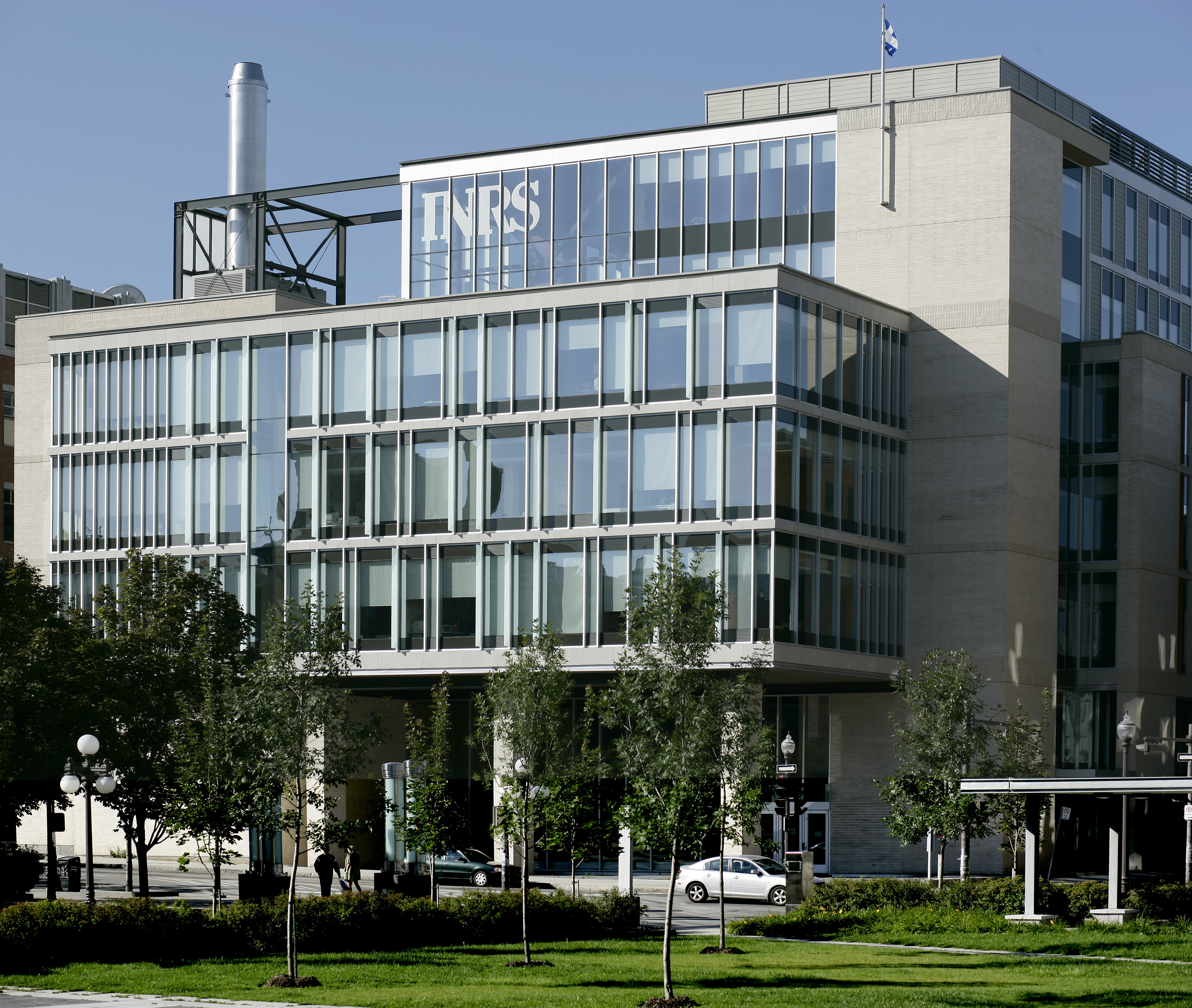
The Institut national de la recherche scientifique helps to advance scientific knowledge and to train a new generation of students in various scientific and technological sectors.

The education system of Quebec, administered by the government of Quebec's Ministry of Education and Higher Education, differs from those of other Canadian provinces. The province has five levels of education: first preschool, then primary school, then secondary school; then CEGEP (see College education in Quebec); and finally university or college. Attached to these levels are the options to also attend professional development opportunities, classes for adults, and continuing education. For every level of teaching, there exists a public network and private network: the public network is financed by taxes while the private options must be paid for by the student. In 2020, school boards were replaced by school service centres.

All universities in Quebec exist by virtue of laws adopted by the National Assembly of Quebec in 1967 during the Quiet Revolution. Their financing mostly comes from public taxes, but the laws under which they operate grants them more autonomy than other levels of education.

=== Research ===
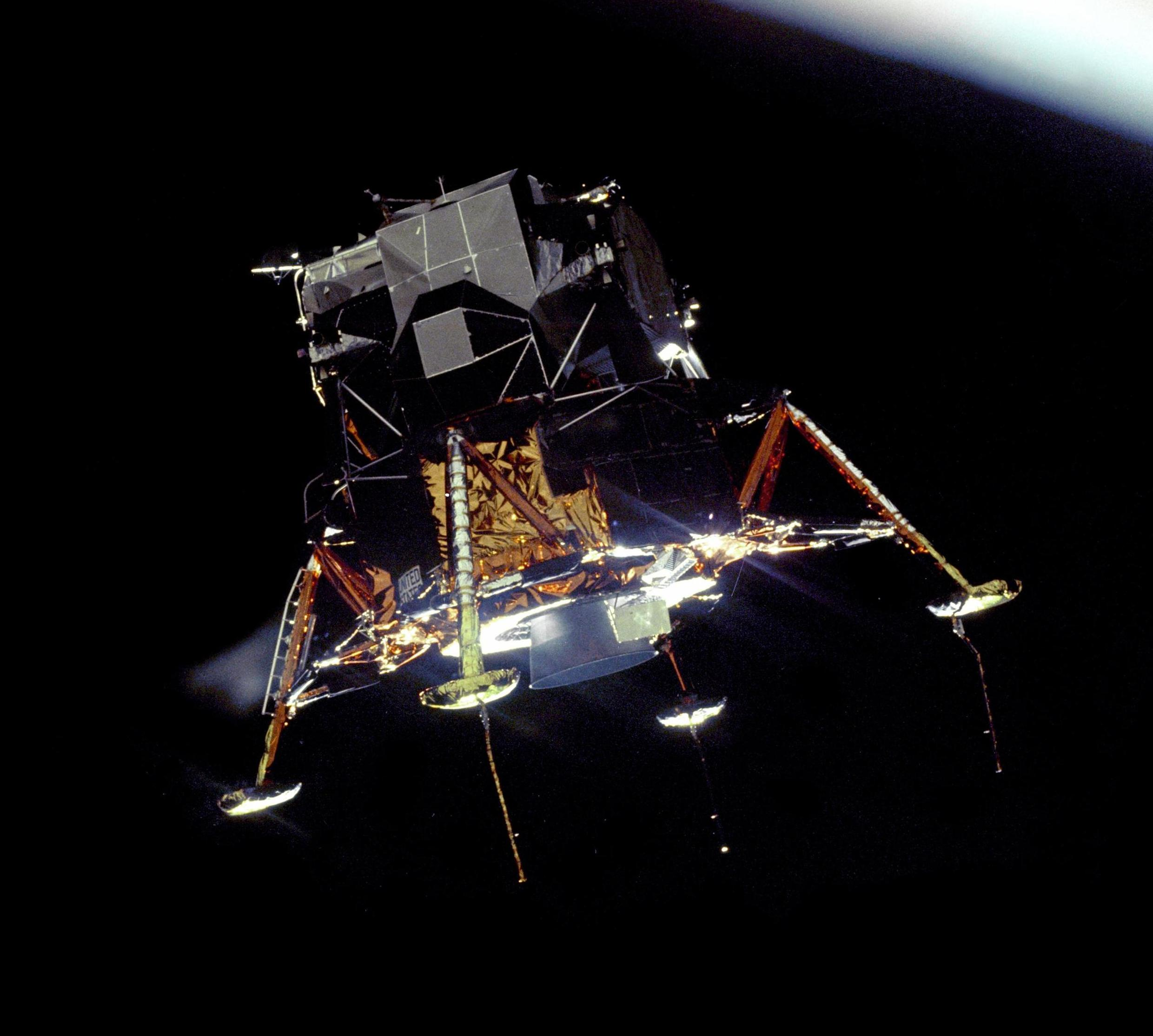
In 1969, Héroux-Devtek designed and manufactured the undercarriage of the Apollo Lunar Module.

Quebec is considered one of world leaders in fundamental scientific research, having produced ten Nobel laureates in either physics, chemistry, or medicine. It is also considered one of the world leaders in sectors such as aerospace, information technology, biotechnology and pharmaceuticals, and therefore plays a significant role in the world's scientific and technological communities. Between 2000 and 2011, Quebec had over 9,469 scientific publications in biomedical research and engineering. The contribution of Quebec in science and technology represented approximately 1% of the research worldwide between the 1980s and 2009.

The province is one of the world leaders in the field of space science and contributed to important discoveries in this field. The Canadian Space Agency was established in Quebec due to its major role in this research field. A total of four Quebecers have been in space since the creation of the CSA: Marc Garneau, Julie Payette, and David Saint-Jacques as CSA astronauts, plus Guy Laliberté as a private citizen who paid for his trip. Quebec has also contributed to the creation of some Canadian artificial satellites including SCISAT-1, ISIS, Radarsat-1 and Radarsat-2.

Quebec ranks among the world leaders in the field of life science. Quebec has more than 450 biotechnology and pharmaceutical companies which together employ more than 25,000 people and 10,000 highly qualified researchers.

== Infrastructure ==
=== Transport ===
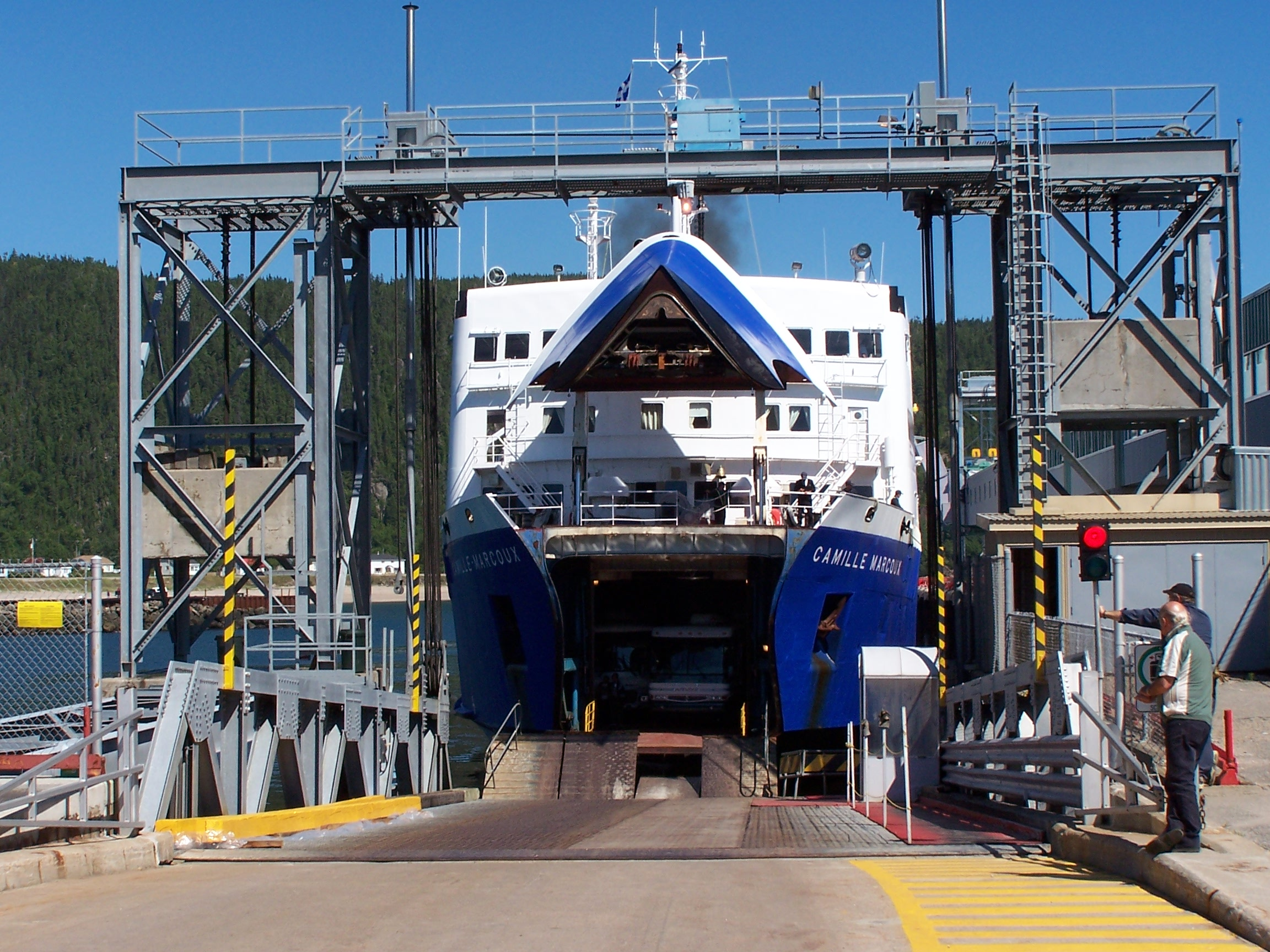
The ferry N.M. Camille-Marcoux, of the Société des traversiers du Québec

Land transport development and security are provided by Transports Québec. Société de l'assurance automobile du Québec (SAAQ; Quebec Automobile Insurance Corporation) manages the réseau routier québécois (Quebec road network), which consists of about 185,000 km (115,000 mi) of highways and national, regional, local, collector and forest roads.

Canadian Coast Guard manages maritime transport. The Saint Lawrence hosts eight deep-water ports. In 2003, 3,886 cargo ships and 9.7 million tonnes of goods transited the Quebec portion of the Saint Lawrence Seaway.

The Commission des transports du Québec works with freight carriers and public transport. Quebec has 6,678 km (4,150 mi) of railways integrated into the North American network. Although primarily intended for goods transport through carriers such as Canadian National (CN) and the Canadian Pacific (CP), the Quebec railway network is also used by inter-city passengers via Via Rail Canada and Amtrak.

Nav Canada manages air transport. Quebec's air network includes 43 airports that offer daily scheduled services. In addition, the Government of Quebec owns airports and heliports in the Basse-Côte-Nord and northern regions.

Quebec has almost 12,000 bridges, tunnels, retaining walls, culverts and other structures such as the Quebec Bridge, the Laviolette Bridge and the Louis-Hippolyte Lafontaine Bridge–Tunnel.

Other transport networks crisscross the province, including hiking trails, snowmobile trails and bike paths. The Green Road is the largest at nearly 4,000 km (2,500 mi) in length.

=== Healthcare ===
Quebec's health policy emphasizes prevention. Similar to other developed economies, life expectancy has lengthened beginning in the 20th century.

Health and social services are provided by one organization. The Quebec health system is public, which means that the government acts as the main insurer and administrator, funding care with taxation, and that patients have access to care regardless of income.

34 health establishments operate in Quebec, 22 via an Integrated Health and Social Services Centre (CISSS). Quebec has approximately 140 hospitals for general or specialised care (CHSGS). Other types of establishments include Centre local de services communautaires (CLSC), Centre d'hébergement et de soins de longue durée (CHSLD), Centre de réadaptation and Centre de protection de l'enfance et de la jeunesse. Private healthcare establishments (paid directly by the patient) include Groupe de médecine de famille, pharmacies, private clinics, dentists, community organisations, and retirement homes.

A 2021 Ipsos poll reported that 85% of Quebecers agree that their health care system is too bureaucratic and in 2023 that fewer than half of Quebecers were satisfied with the system.

=== Housing ===
In 2021, 59.9% of Quebec's residents were property owners. In 2019, among property owners, 34% were couples with kids, 33% were couples without children, 22% lived alone, 8% were single parents, and 3% were something else. Among renters, 16% were couples with kids, 13% were couples without children, 51% lived alone, 13% were single parents, and 7% were something else.

Since the 1980s, the average price of a single-family home has doubled every 10 years, going from $48,715 in 1980 to $424,844 in 2021. Since the average salary did not follow these increases, Quebec homes are 10 times more expensive than they were 40 years ago. In 2022, the cities with the most severe housing shortages were Granby, with a vacancy rate of 0,1%, followed by Marieville (0,1%), Rimouski (0,2%), Drummondville (0,2%) and Rouyn-Noranda (0,3%).

== Culture ==
Quebec has developed its own unique culture from its historic New France roots. Its culture also symbolizes a distinct perspective: being a French-speaking nation surrounded by a bigger English-speaking culture.

The Quartier Latin (English: Latin Quarter) of Montreal, and Vieux-Québec (English: Old Quebec) in Quebec City are two hubs of metropolitan cultural activity. Life in the cafés and "terrasses" (outdoor restaurant terraces) reveals a Latin influence in Quebec's culture, with the théâtre Saint-Denis in Montreal and the Capitole de Québec theatre in Quebec City being among the principal attractions.

A number of governmental and non-government organizations support cultural activity in Quebec. The Conseil des arts et des lettres du Québec (CALQ) is an initiative of the Ministry of Culture and Communications (Quebec). It supports creation, innovation, production, and international exhibits for all cultural fields of Quebec. The Société de développement des entreprises culturelles (SODEC) works to promote and fund individuals working in the cultural industry. The Prix du Québec is an award given by the government to confer the highest distinction and honour to individuals demonstrating exceptional achievement in their respective cultural field. Other awards include the Athanase David Awards (Literature), Félix Awards (Music), Gémeaux Awards (Television and film), Jutra Awards (Cinema), Masques Awards (Theatre), Olivier Guimond Awards (Humour) and the Opus Awards (Concert music).

=== Performing arts ===
Traditional music is imbued with many dances, such as the jig, the quadrille, the reel and line dancing. Traditional instruments include harmonica, fiddle, spoons, jaw harp and accordion. The First Nations and the Inuit of Quebec also have their own traditional music. Quebec's most popular artists of the last century include the singers Félix Leclerc, Gilles Vigneault, Kate and Anna McGarrigle and Céline Dion. The Association québécoise de l'industrie du disque, du spectacle et de la vidéo (ADISQ) was created in 1978 to promote the music industry in Quebec. The Orchestre symphonique de Québec and the Montreal Symphony Orchestra are respectively associated with the Opéra de Québec and the Opéra de Montreal, whose performances are presented at the Grand Théâtre de Québec and at Place des Arts. The Ballets Jazz de Montreal, the Grands Ballets and La La La Human Steps are three important professional troupes of contemporary dance.

Among the theatre troupes are the Compagnie Jean-Duceppe, the Théâtre La Rubrique, and the Théâtre Le Grenier. In addition to the network of cultural centres in Quebec, the venues include the Monument-National and the Rideau Vert (green curtain) Theatre in Montreal, and the Trident Theatre in Quebec City. The National Theatre School of Canada and the Conservatoire de musique et d'art dramatique du Québec train actors.

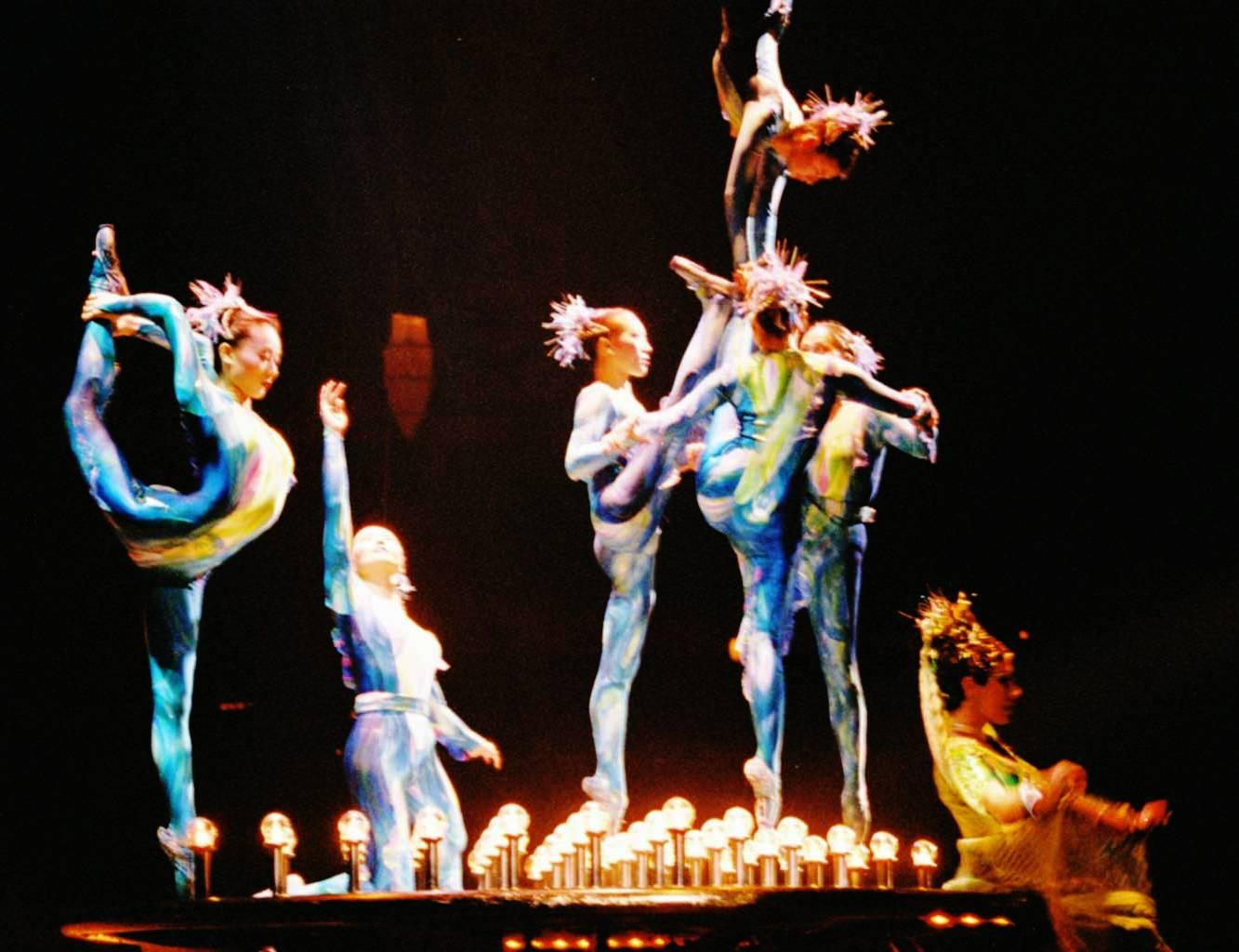
The show Dralion, Cirque du Soleil, introduced in 2004

Several circus troupes were created in recent decades, the most important being Cirque du Soleil. Among these troops are contemporary, travelling and on-horseback circuses, such as Les 7 Doigts de la Main, Cirque Éloize, Cavalia, Kosmogonia, Saka and Cirque Akya. The National Circus School and the École de cirque de Québec were created to train contemporary circus artists. Tohu, la Cité des Arts du Cirque, was founded in 2004 to disseminate the circus arts.

Comedy is a vast cultural sector. Quebec has created and is home to several different comedy festivals, including the Just for Laughs festival in Montreal, as well as the Grand Rire festivals of Quebec, Gatineau and Sherbrooke. The Association des professionnels de l'industrie de l'humour (APIH) is the main organization for the promotion and development of the cultural sector of humour in Quebec and the National School of Humour, created in 1988, trains humorists in Quebec.

=== Media ===
The Cinémathèque québécoise has a mandate to promote the film and television heritage of Quebec. The National Film Board of Canada (NFB), a federal Crown corporation, provides for the same mission in Canada. The Association of Film and Television in Quebec (APFTQ) promotes independent production in film and television. While the Association of Producers and Directors of Quebec (APDQ) represents the business of filmmaking and television, the Association of Community Radio Broadcasters of Quebec (ARCQ) (French acronym) represents the independent radio stations. Several movie theatres across Quebec ensure the dissemination of Quebec cinema. With its cinematic installations, such as the Cité du cinéma and Mel's studios, the city of Montreal is home to the filming of various productions. The state corporation Télé-Québec, the federal Crown corporation CBC, general and specialized private channels, networks, independent and community radio stations broadcast the various Quebec téléromans, the national and regional news, and other programming. Les Rendez-vous du cinéma québécois is a festival surrounding the ceremony of the Jutra Awards Night that rewards work and personalities of Quebec cinema. The Artis and the Gemini Awards gala recognize the personalities of television and radio industry in Quebec and French Canada. The Film Festival of the 3 Americas, the Festival of International Short Film, the World Film Festival and the Festival of New Cinema are other annual events surrounding the film industry in Quebec.

In the realm of literature and international publishing, the Québec Édition group is a committee created by the National Association of Book Editors dedicated to the international influence of French-language publishings from Quebec and Canada.

=== Literature and folklore ===
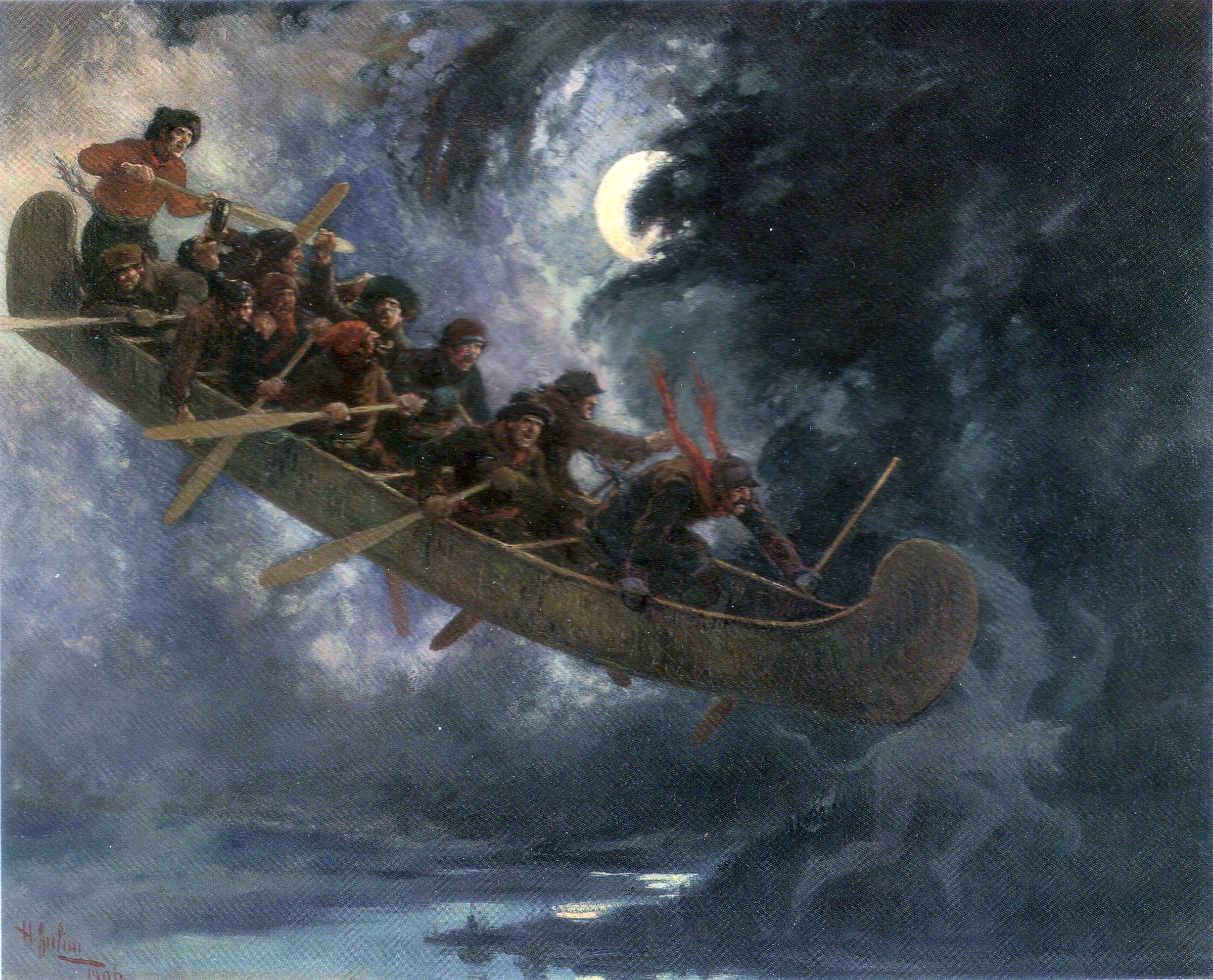
La chasse-galerie (1906) by Henri Julien, showing a scene from a popular Quebec folk legend

Quebec's French-speaking populace has the second largest body of folktales in Canada (the first being First Nations). When the early settlers arrived from France in the 17th century, they brought with them popular tales from their homeland, which were adapted to the local context. Many were passed on through generations by raconteurs, or storytellers. Almost all of the stories native to Quebec were influenced by Christian dogma and superstitions. The Devil, for instance, appears often as either a person, an animal or monster, or indirectly through Demonic acts. Various tales and stories are told through oral tradition, such as, among many others, the legends of the Bogeyman, the Chasse-galerie, the Black Horse of Trois-Pistoles, the Complainte de Cadieux, the Corriveau, the dancing devil of Saint-Ambroise, the Giant Beaupré, the monsters of the lakes Pohénégamook and Memphremagog, of Quebec Bridge (called the Devil's Bridge), the Rocher Percé and of Rose Latulipe, for example.

From New France, Quebec literature was first developed in the travel accounts of explorers. The Moulin à paroles traces the great texts that have shaped the history of Quebec. The first to write the history of Quebec, since its discovery, was the historian François-Xavier Garneau. Many Quebec poets and prominent authors marked their era and today remain anchored in the collective imagination, like, among others, Philippe Aubert de Gaspé, Octave Crémazie, Honoré Beaugrand, Émile Nelligan, Lionel Groulx, Gabrielle Roy, Hubert Aquin, Michel Tremblay, Marie Laberge, Fred Pellerin and Gaston Miron. The regional novel from Quebec is called Terroir novel and is a literary tradition specific to the province.

=== Art and architecture ===
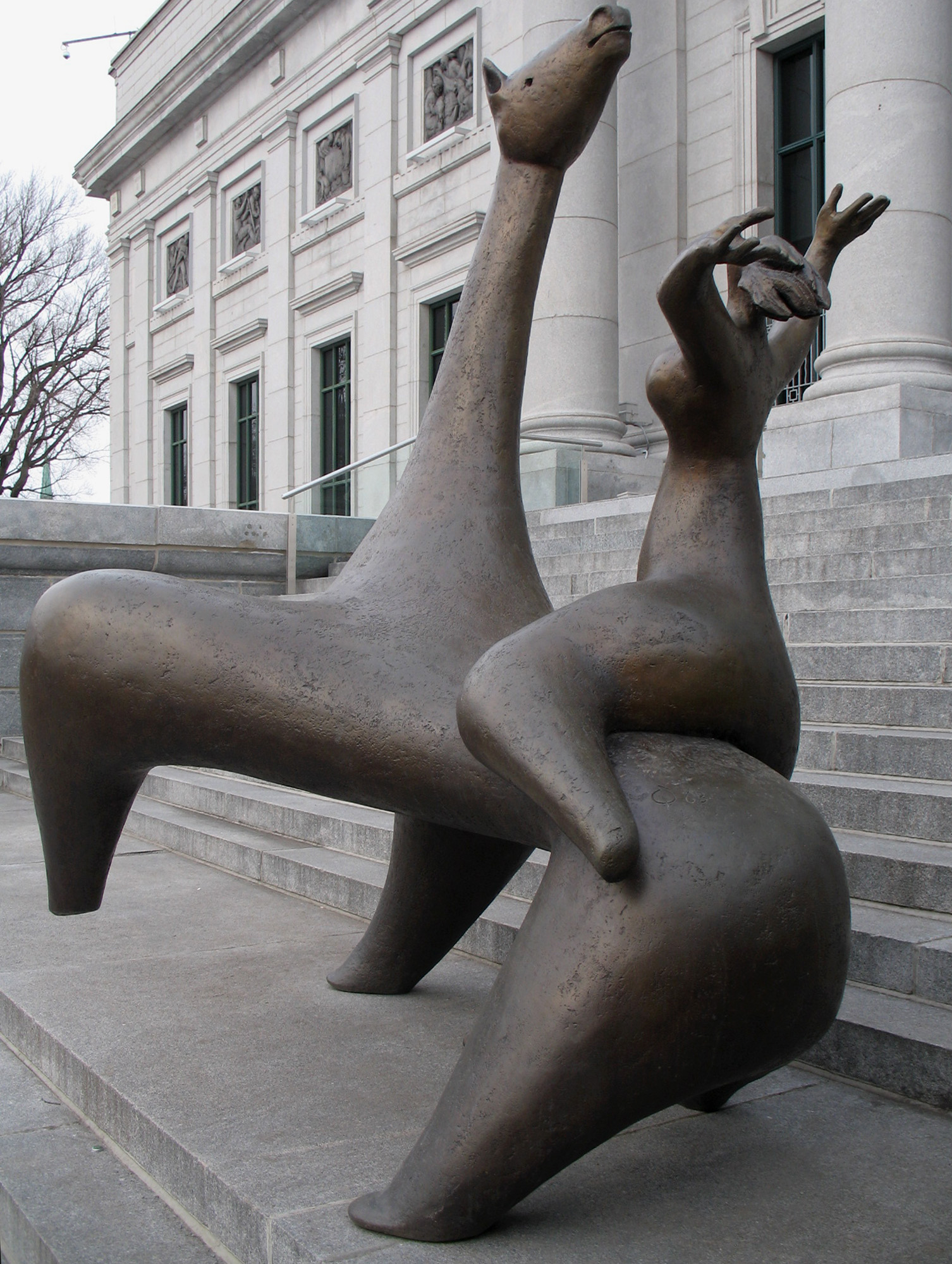
La Cavalière by Charles Daudelin, 1963, installed in front of the pavilion Gérard Morisset of the Quebec National Museum of Fine Arts in Quebec City

The art of Quebec has developed around the specific characteristics of its landscapes and cultural, historical, social and political representations. The development of Quebec masterpieces in painting, printmaking and sculpture is marked by the contribution of artists such as Louis-Philippe Hébert, Cornelius Krieghoff, Alfred Laliberté, Marc-Aurèle Fortin, Marc-Aurèle de Foy Suzor-Coté, Jean Paul Lemieux, Clarence Gagnon, Adrien Dufresne, Alfred Pellan, Jean-Philippe Dallaire, Charles Daudelin, Arthur Villeneuve, Jean-Paul Riopelle, Paul-Émile Borduas and Marcelle Ferron.

The fine arts of Quebec are displayed at the Quebec National Museum of Fine Arts, the Montreal Museum of Contemporary Art, the Montreal Museum of Fine Arts, the Quebec Salon des métiers d'art and in many art galleries. The Montreal School of Fine Arts forms the painters, printmakers and sculptors of Quebec.

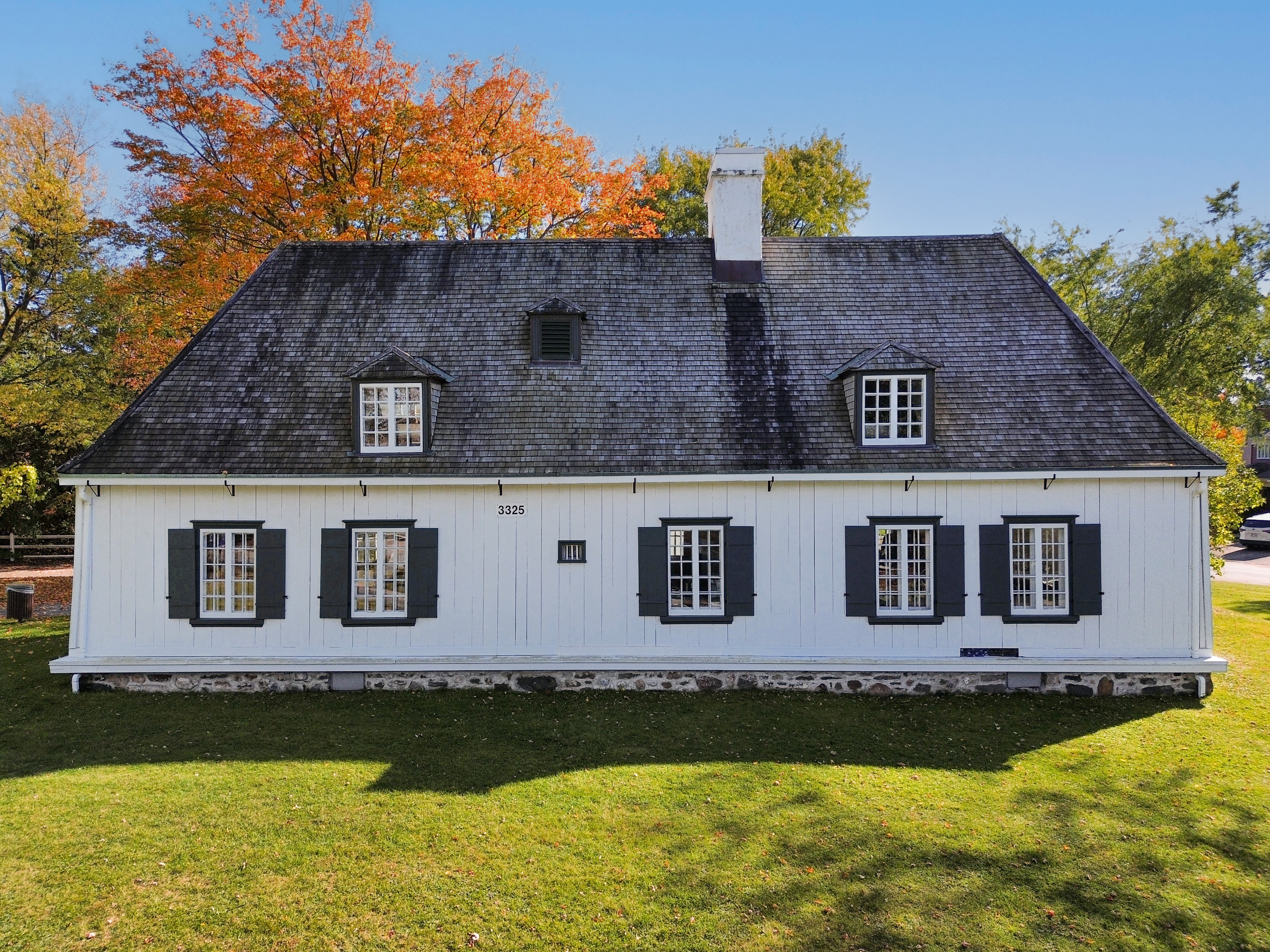
Maison Routhier in Sainte-Foy, a Canadien-style house

Quebec's architecture is characterized by its unique Canadien-style buildings as well as the juxtaposition of a variety of styles reflective of Quebec's history. When walking in any city or town, one can come across buildings with styles congruent to Classical, Neo-Gothic, Roman, Neo-Renaissance, Greek Revival, Neo-Classical, Québécois Neo-Classical, Victorian, Second Empire, Modern, Post-modern or skyscrapers.

Canadien-style houses and barns were developed by the first settlers of New France along the banks of the Saint Lawrence River. These buildings are rectangular one-storey structures with an extremely tall and steep roof, sometimes almost twice as tall as the house below. Canadien-style churches also developed and served as landmarks while traversing rural Quebec.

=== Heritage ===
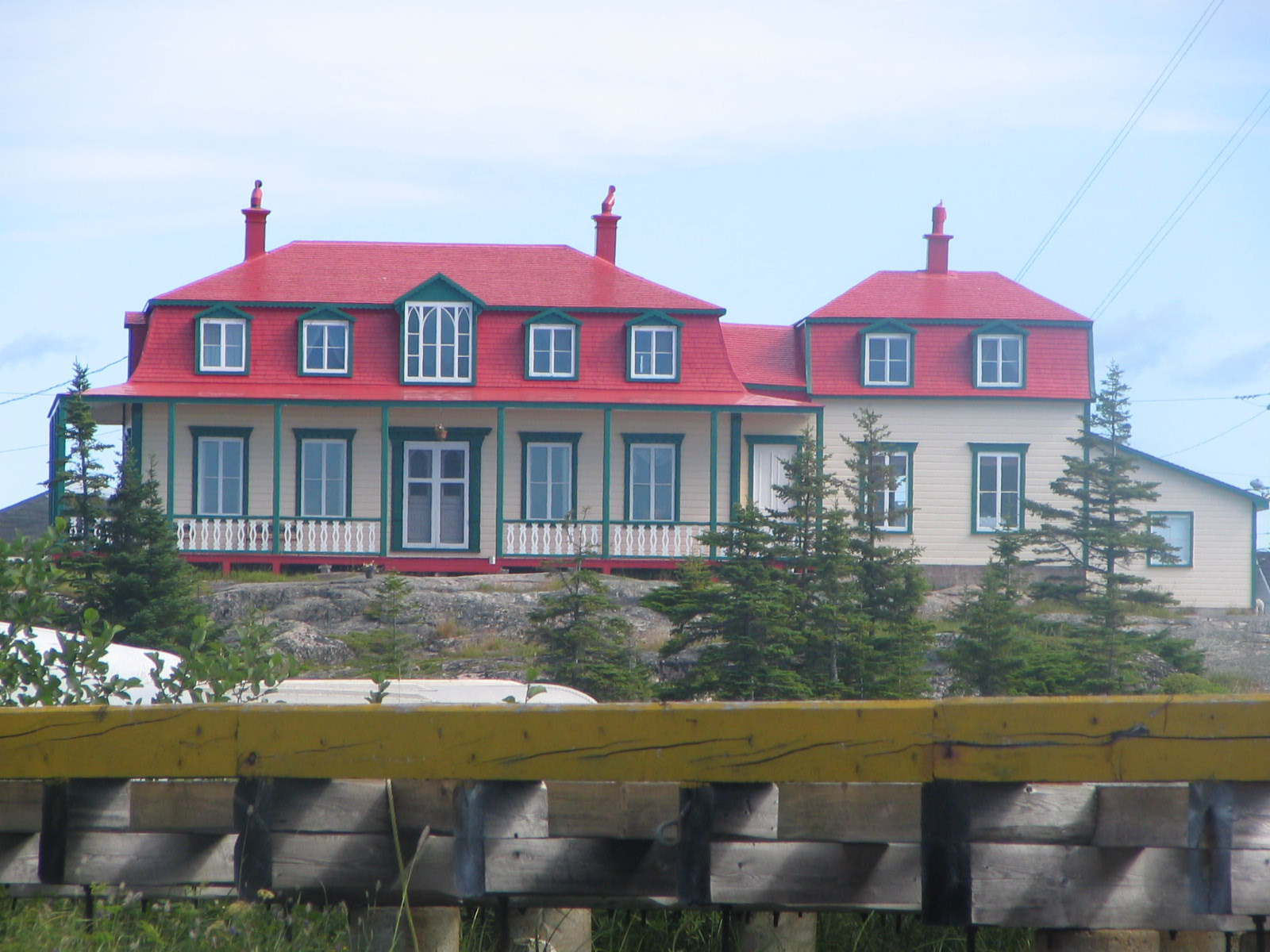
Johan Beetz House, a Second Empire-inspired rural residence at Baie-Johan-Beetz, Minganie

Several sites, houses and historical works reflect the cultural heritage of Quebec, such as the Village Québécois d'Antan, the historical village of Val-Jalbert, the Fort Chambly, the national home of the Patriots, the Chicoutimi pulp mill (Pulperie de Chicoutimi), the Lachine Canal and the Victoria Bridge. As of December 2011, there are 198 National Historic Sites of Canada in Quebec. These sites were designated as being of national historic significance.

Various museums tell the cultural history of Quebec, like the Museum of Civilization, the Museum of French America, the McCord Museum or the Montreal Museum of Archaeology and History in Pointe-à-Callière, displaying artifacts, paintings and other remains from the past of Quebec. Notable schools include the Conservatoire de musique et d'art dramatique du Québec, the École nationale de théâtre du Canada and the École nationale de cirque. Notable public agencies to catalogue and further develop Quebec's culture include the Bibliothèque et Archives nationales du Québec, the Conseil des arts et des lettres du Québec and Télé-Québec. The Association québécoise des loisirs folkloriques is an organization committed to preserving and disseminating Quebec's folklore heritage.

=== Cuisine ===
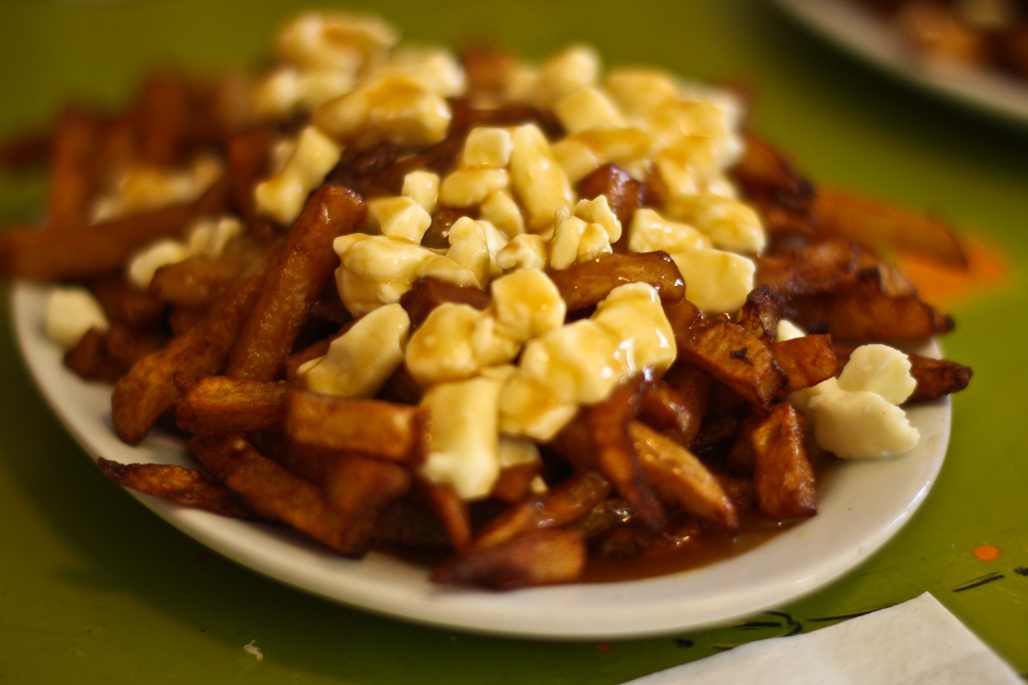
A classic poutine

The traditional Quebecois cuisine descends from 16th-century French cuisine, the fur trade and a history of hunting. Quebec's cuisine has also been influenced by learning from First Nation, by English cuisine and by American cuisine. Quebec is most famous for its tourtière, pâté chinois, poutine, and St. Catherine's taffy among others. The "temps des sucres" is a period during springtime when many Quebecers go to the sugar shack (cabane à sucre) for a traditional meal.

Quebec is the world's biggest maple syrup producer. The province has a long history of producing maple syrup, and creating new maple-derived products. Other major food products include beer, wine (including ice wine and ice cider), and cheese.

=== Sports ===
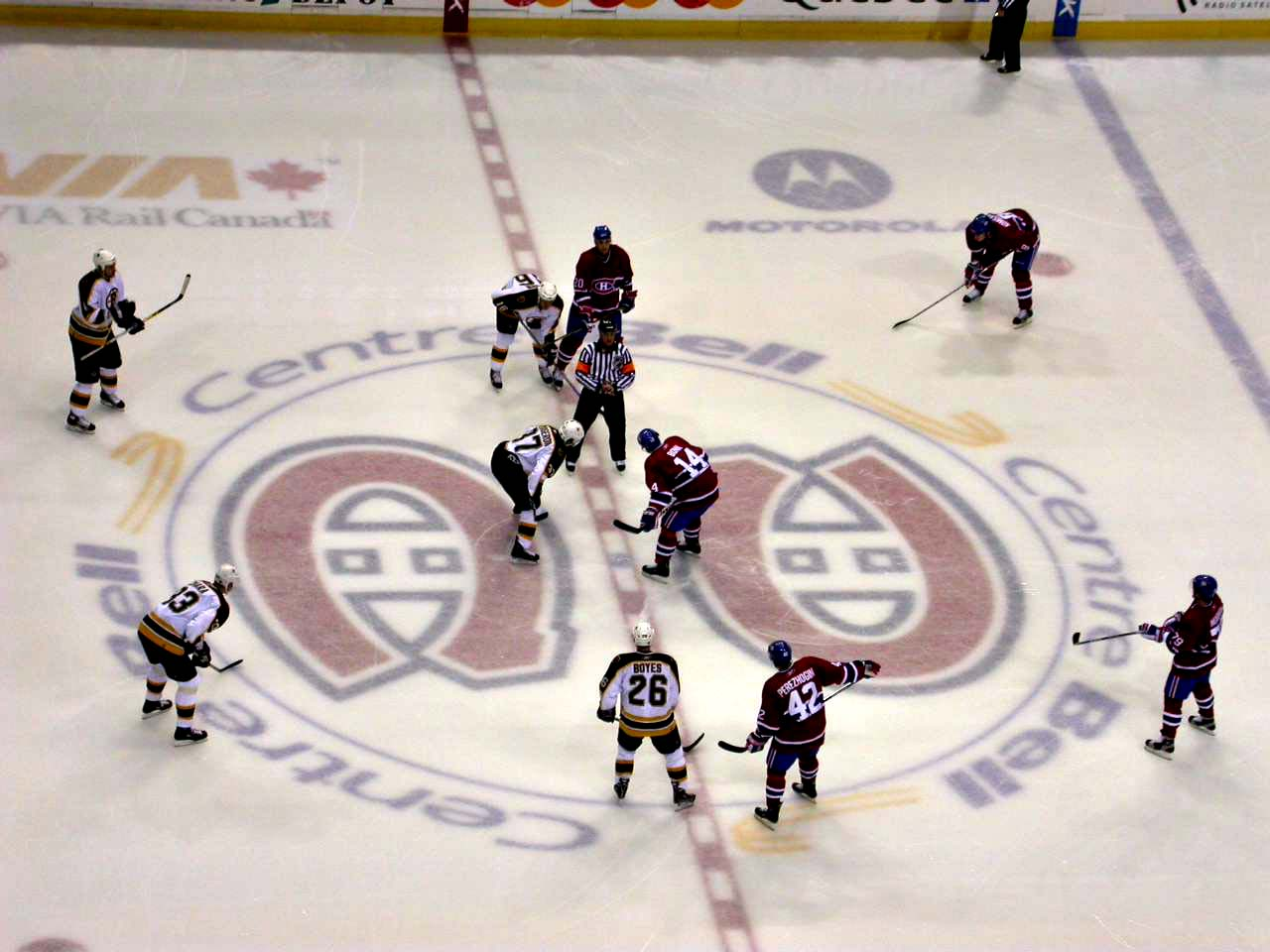
The Montreal Canadiens at the Bell Centre

Sports in Quebec constitutes an essential dimension of Quebec culture. Ice hockey remains the national sport. This sport was played for the first time on March 3, 1875, in Montreal and has been promoted over the years by numerous achievements, including the centenary of the Montreal Canadiens. Other major sports include Canadian football with the Montreal Alouettes, soccer with Club de Foot Montréal, the Grand Prix du Canada Formula 1 racing with drivers such as Gilles Villeneuve and Jacques Villeneuve, and professional baseball with the former Montreal Expos. Quebec has hosted several major sporting events, including the 1976 Summer Olympics, the Fencing World Championships in 1967, track cycling in 1974, and the Transat Québec-Saint-Malo race created in 1984.

Quebec athletes have an above-average performance at the Winter Olympics over recent years. The athletic team was collectively awarded 12 of 29 medals won by Canada at the 2018 Winter Olympics in Pyeongchang, 12 of the 27 Canadian medals in 2014, and 9 of the 26 Canadian medals in 2010.

=== Holidays and symbols ===
St-Jean-Baptiste Day is one of Quebec's biggest holidays. In 1977, the Quebec Parliament declared June 24, the day of La Saint-Jean-Baptiste, to be Quebec's National Holiday. La Saint-Jean-Baptiste, or La St-Jean, honours French Canada's patron saint, John the Baptist. On this day, the song "Gens du pays", by Gilles Vigneault, is often heard. The song À la claire fontaine was the anthem of the New France, Patriots and French Canadian, then replaced by O Canada, but "Gens du pays" is preferred by many Quebecers to be the national anthem of Quebec.

National Patriots' Day, a statutory holiday in Quebec, is also a unique public holiday, which honours the patriotes with displays of the patriote flag, music, public speeches, and ceremonies. Le Vieux de '37 ("The Old Man of '37"), an illustration by Henri Julien that depicts a patriot of this rebellion, is sometimes added at the centre of Patriote flags. Moving Day is a tradition where leases terminate on July 1. This creates a social phenomenon where everyone seems to be moving out at the same time.

Other distinct holiday traditions include the Réveillon, a giant feast and party which takes place during Christmas Eve and New Year's Eve and goes on until midnight. Traditional dishes like tourtière or cipâte are offered, and rigaudon, spoon or violin may be played. Finally, April Fools' Day is called Poisson d'Avril ("April's Fish") because while pulling pranks is still important, there is another major tradition: sticking fish-shaped paper cutouts to people's backs without them noticing.

In 1939, the government of Quebec unilaterally ratified its coat of arms to reflect Quebec's political history: French rule (gold lily on blue background), followed by British rule (lion on red background), followed by Canadian rule (maple leaves). Je me souviens ("I remember") is an official part of the coat of arms and has been the official licence plate motto since 1978, replacing the previous motto: La belle province ("the beautiful province"), still used as a nickname for the province. The fleur-de-lis, one of Quebec's most common symbols, is an ancient symbol of the French monarchy. Finally, the Great Seal of Quebec is used to authenticate documents issued by the government of Quebec.

The first members of the Saint-Jean-Baptiste Society created the Carillon Sacré-Coeur flag, which consisted of a white cross on an azure background with white fleur-de-lis in each corner and a Sacred Heart surrounded by maple leaves in the centre; it was based on the French merchant flag flown by Champlain and the Flag of Carillon. The Carillon Sacré-Coeur and French merchant flag to be the major inspirations for creating Quebec's current flag in 1903, called the Fleurdelisé. The Fleurdelisé replaced the Union Jack on Quebec's Parliament Building on January 21, 1948.

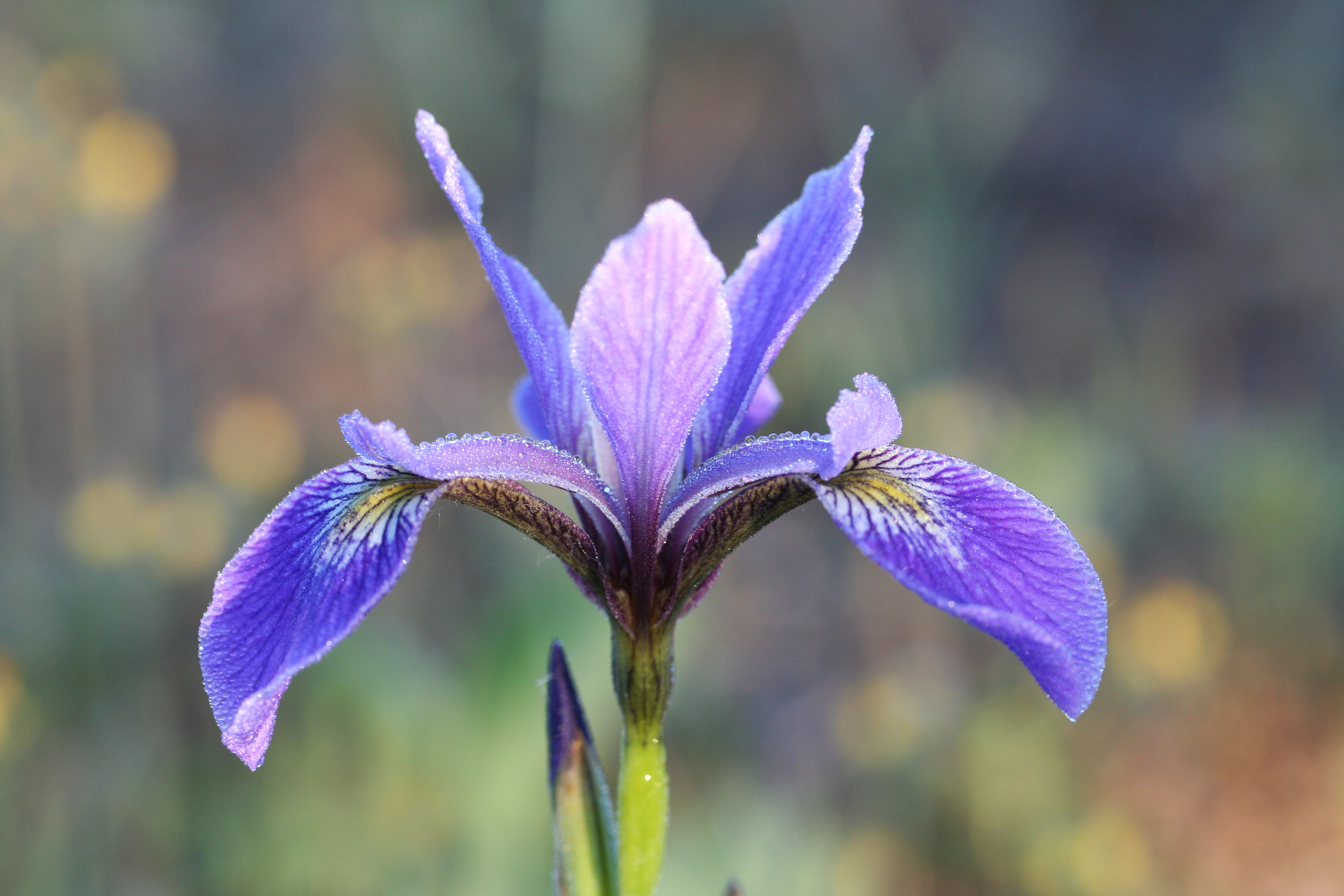
Iris versicolor – floral emblem of Quebec

Three new official emblems in were adopted in the late 20th century: the snowy owl in 1987 to symbolize the whiteness of Quebec's semi-northern climate, the yellow birch in 1993 for the variety of its uses and by its commercial value, and the iris versicolor in 1999 to illustrate the cultural diversity of Quebec and the importance of water and wetlands for the balance of nature.

== Quebec's diaspora ==
The earliest immigrants to the Canadian prairies were French Canadians from Quebec. Many Franco-Albertans, Fransaskois and Franco-Manitobans are descended from them.

From the mid-1800s to the Great Depression, Quebec experienced the Grande Hémorragie ("Great Hemorrhaging"), a massive emigration of 900,000 people from Quebec to New England. French Canadians often established themselves in Little Canadas in many industrial New England centres. Of the 900,000 Québécois who emigrated, about half returned at some point before settling permanently. Most of the descendants of those who stayed are now assimilated, though a few Franco-Americans remain, speaking New England French.

Some tried to slow the Grande Hémorragie by redirecting people north, which resulted in the founding of many regions in Quebec (ex. Saguenay-Lac-St-Jean, Val-d'Or) but also in Northeastern Ontario. The northeastern Franco-Ontarians of today, who live in Timmins, Hearst, Moosonee and Sault Sainte Marie, among others, are the descendants of emigrants from Quebec who worked in the mines of the area.

In recent times, snowbirds often migrate to southern Florida during the winter, resulting in the emergence of temporary "Québécois regions," such as in Hollywood.

== International relations ==
Quebec's closest international partner is the United States, with which it shares a long and positive history. Products of American culture like songs, movies, fashion and food strongly affect Québécois culture.

Quebec has a historied relationship with France, as Quebec was a part of the French Empire and both regions share a language. The Fédération France-Québec and the Francophonie are a few of the tools used for relations between Quebec and France. In Paris, a place du Québec was inaugurated in 1980. Quebec also has a historied relationship with the United Kingdom, having been a part of the British Empire. Quebec and the UK share the same head of state, King Charles III.

Quebec has a network of 32 offices in 18 countries. These offices serve the purpose of representing Quebec in foreign countries and are overseen by Quebec's Ministry of International Relations. Quebec, like other Canadian provinces, also maintains representatives in some Canadian embassies and consulates general. As of 2019, the Government of Quebec had delegates-general (agents-general) in Brussels, London, Mexico City, Munich, New York City, Paris and Tokyo; delegates to Atlanta, Boston, Chicago, Houston, Los Angeles, and Rome; and offices headed by directors offering more limited services in Barcelona, Beijing, Dakar, Hong Kong, Mumbai, São Paulo, Shanghai, Stockholm, and Washington. In addition, there are the equivalent of honorary consuls, titled antennes, in Berlin, Philadelphia, Qingdao, Seoul, and Silicon Valley.

Quebec also has a representative to UNESCO and participates in the Organization of American States. Quebec is a member of the Assemblée parlementaire de la Francophonie and of the Organisation internationale de la francophonie.

== See also ==
- Index of Quebec-related articles
- Outline of Quebec
