= Anti-Quebec sentiment =

Prejudice toward the people of Quebec

Anti-Quebec sentiment (French: Sentiment anti-Québécois) is a form of prejudice which is expressed toward the government, culture, and/or the francophone people of Quebec. This prejudice must be distinguished from legitimate criticism of Quebec society or the Government of Quebec, though the question of what qualifies as legitimate criticism and mere prejudice is itself controversial. Quebec bashing is sometimes presented as legitimate criticism of Quebec society, government, or public policies.

== Québec bashing ==
The French-language media in Quebec, particularly Quebecor, has termed anti-Quebec sentiment Québec bashing—what it perceives as hateful, anti-Quebec coverage in the English-language media. It mostly cites examples from the English-Canadian media, and occasionally in coverage from other countries, often based on Canadian sources. Some sovereignist journalists and academics noted that unfavourable depictions of the province by the media increased in the late 1990s after the unsuccessful 1995 Quebec referendum on independence. Quebec-bashing has been denounced as dishonest, false, defamatory prejudiced, racist, colonialist, or hate speech by many people of all origins and political colours in Quebec.

== Themes ==
French-speaking Quebecers have been criticized by English-speaking Quebecers, who argue they are discriminated against because the law requires French to be the only work language in large companies since 1977. The expression pure laine ("pure wool") to denote Quebecers of French descent has also often been cited as a manifestation of discriminatory attitudes. Pure laine has been characterized as an expression of racial exclusion in Quebec, but countercritics claim the term is obsolete and seldom used.

Critics note the low percentage of minority participation in any level of the Quebec public services. Some efforts have been made to increase the percentage of minorities in the Montreal Police Force and the public service of Quebec (such as the Société de l'assurance automobile du Québec, the Ministry of Health and Social Services); they are largely European-Canadian francophones.

Language laws in Quebec that promote the use of French and restrict the use of English are justified as necessary to preserve and to strengthen the French language within the province. They are criticized as reinforcing barriers for non-French speakers. The Commission de la protection de la langue française (CPLF) and the Office québécois de la langue française (OQLF) merged in 2002 and enforce the Charter of the French Language; it has been derided as the "language police." It has been criticized for enforcing sign laws—laws requiring that French wording dominate English and other languages on commercial signs. English-speaking Quebecers strongly oppose the sign laws. The public servants of the OQLF have sometimes been compared to the Gestapo or "brown shirts."

== Context ==
=== Quebec context ===
Quebec is a province within Canada. It has a French-speaking majority. According to the 2016 census, 77.1% of Quebec residents cite French alone as their mother tongue and 84.5% use French as their primary first official language of Canada. In contrast, the rest of Canada has a majority of English-speakers; 70.6% cite English alone as their mother tongue. While 86.2% of Canada's population report being able to "conduct a conversation in English," only 29.8% of Canadians report being able to hold a conversation in French, according to Statistics Canada.

Before 1763, most of the land that is now in the Province of Quebec was part of New France, an area of North America that was colonized by France. After the defeat of France in the Seven Years' War, the territory was ceded to Great Britain and became a British colony. It was united with the future province of Ontario in 1840, and finally a became a province of Canada in 1867 after confederation.

==== 19th century ====
An early Quebec nationalist movement emerged in the 1820s under the Parti Patriote, which argued for greater autonomy within the British Empire and at times flirted with the idea of independence. The Lower Canada Rebellion was suppressed by government forces at roughly the same time as the failure of a similar rebellion among English Canadians in what is now Ontario. After the suppression of the rebellion, Quebec gradually became a more conservative society in which the Roman Catholic Church occupied a more dominant position.

Religious, language and ethnic differences worsened decade by decade. European Canadians were highly religious, but the Protestants and Catholics hated each other. The Francophones saw their traditional culture under siege by the Anglophones, who controlled business and finance across Canada, including Quebec's, and systematically blocked the expansion of French language schools outside Quebec. The hanging of Louis Riel for treason in 1885 convinced Francophones they were under attack, and permanently undermined the Conservative base in Quebec. French nationalism emerged as a powerful force that is still a dominant factor in Quebec's history. Inside the Irish community, the longstanding bitterness between the Protestant Orange and the Catholic green continued unabated. The Orange boasted of the supremacy of their Anglo-Saxon civilization and Protestant culture over the backward, medieval, priest-ridden Catholicism. They ridiculed the French and Irish races as backwards and ultimately doomed. (Note: "Race” was a synonym for what the 21st century calls an ethnic group. The ethnic-religious-language lines were sharply drawn. Intermarriage was rare and indeed friendships and casual communication were not sought after. The Catholic Irish, however, joined with Protestants to block the expansion of French schools outside Quebec, thereby causing severe tensions inside the Catholic community.)

==== 20th century ====
===== The conscription crisis of 1917 =====
In 1917, after three years of a war that was supposed to have been over in three months, Casualties had been very high and there was a severe shortage of volunteers. Prime Minister Robert Borden had originally promised not to introduce conscription, but now believed it was necessary to win the war. The Military Service Act was passed in July, but there was fierce opposition, mostly from French Canadians (led not only by firebrand Henri Bourassa, but also by moderate Wilfrid Laurier). Borden's government almost collapsed, but he was able to form a Union government with the Liberal opposition (although Laurier did not join the new government). In the 1917 election, the Union government was re-elected, but with no support from Quebec. Over the next year, the war finally ended, with very few Canadian conscripts actually sent to France.

===== Conscription Crisis of 1944 =====
The Conscription Crisis of 1944 was a political and military crisis following the introduction of forced military service for men during World War II. It was similar to the Conscription Crisis of 1917, but not as politically damaging.

From the beginning, acceptance of French-speaking units was greater in Canada during World War Two than World War One. In 1914, the drive to create the 22nd Infantry Battalion (French-Canadian) had necessitated large rallies of French Canadians and political pressure to overcome Minister Sam Hughes' abhorrence of the idea. But during World War II, greater acceptance of French-Canadian units, as well as informal use of their language, lessened the ferocity of Quebec's resistance to the war effort.

===== Since 1950s =====
In the late 1950s and the 1960s, a massive social transformation in Quebec that was known as the Quiet Revolution took place. Quebec's society became rapidly more secular as the Catholic Church and local clergy lost much of their power over the people. The economically marginalized French-speaking majority slowly and peacefully took control of Quebec's economy from the long-ruling English minority. A new independence movement developed, along with a reassertion of Quebec's French language, culture, and unique identity. A terrorist organization, the Front de libération du Québec (FLQ), arose, as well as the peaceful Parti Québécois, a provincial political party with the stated aims of independence and social democracy. Over time, the FLQ vanished, but the PQ flourished.

Assimilation, which was the fate of the francophone culture of the former Louisiana Territory in the United States, is feared by French Canadians. The French language was discriminated against for a long time in Canada, even in Quebec. The Quebec Liberal Party, led by Premier Robert Bourassa, passed the Official Language Act (Bill 22) in 1974, which abolished English as an official language and made French the sole official language of Quebec. In 1976, the Parti Québécois was elected and René Lévesque, a major figure of the Quiet Revolution, became premier. The PQ rapidly enacted the Charter of the French Language (Bill 101). Many of the French Language Charter's provisions expanded on the 1974 Official Language Act. The protective language law outlawed the public display of English, making French signs obligatory, regulations that would later be overturned following court challenges. A first referendum on sovereignty was held in 1980 under the leadership of Lévesque. The YES side—in favour of separation—lost with 40.44% of the vote. A second referendum was held in 1995 with Lucien Bouchard, Jacques Parizeau and Mario Dumont as leaders. The YES campaign narrowly lost with 49.42% support.

Historian and sociologist Gérard Bouchard, à co-chair of the Bouchard-Taylor Commission, has suggested that the francophones of Quebec or French Canadian descent consider themselves a fragile and colonized minority. Despite forming the majority of the population of Quebec, they have found it difficult to accept other ethnic groups as also being Quebecers. He thinks that an independent Quebec with a founding myth based upon un acte fondateur would give the Québécois the confidence to act more generously to incorporate all willing ethnic communities in Quebec into a unified whole.

According to a Léger Marketing survey of January 2007, 86% of Quebecers of ethnic origins other than English have a good opinion of the ethnically French majority. At the same time, English-speaking Quebecers and some ethnic minorities and English Canadians outside Quebec have criticized the Francophones because of the implementation of Bill 101. The law has been challenged in courts, which sometimes call for the use of both of Canada's official languages in Quebec.

=== English-Canadian context ===
George Brown, a prominent Canada West politician, Father of Confederation and founder of The Globe newspaper, said before Confederation: "What has French-Canadianism been denied? Nothing. It bars all it dislikes—it extorts all its demands—and it grows insolent over its victories." While Quebec has pursued a distinctive national identity, English Canada tried to adopt multiculturalism. Pierre Trudeau was the prime minister during much of the period from 1968 to 1984. A French Canadian who seemed until the early 1980s to have some degree of support among the Quebec people, he believed that Canada needed to abandon the "two nations" theory in favour of multiculturalism and insisted on treating all provinces as inherently equal to one another. He did not want to accord a constitutional veto or distinct society status to Quebec. Professor Kenneth McRoberts of York University stated that the Trudeau legacy has led the "rest of Canada" to misunderstand Quebec nationalism. It opposes the federal and the Quebec governments in relation to issues of language, culture, and national identity. In 1991, McRoberts argued that the effect of Trudeau's policies of official bilingualism, multiculturalism, and entrenchment of the Charter of Rights and Freedoms, coupled with provincial language laws in Quebec establishing "the preeminence of French within its own territory," has created an appearance of Quebec having acted "in bad faith" in violation of "a contract which it had made with English Canada whereby official bilingualism would be the rule throughout the country."

Added to the limited comprehension of Quebec among English Canadians, a series of events in Quebec has continued to draw criticism from journalists and English Canadians and questions about the attitudes of Québécois towards the Anglophones, Jewish, and other ethnic minorities in Quebec, some of which are discussed above. The concession speech of Jacques Parizeau following the 1995 referendum, in which he blamed the defeat on "money and the ethnic vote," was interpreted by some as a tacit reference to traditional stereotypes of the Jewish, and it created a controversy that sparked disapproval from both sides. In 2000, a further storm of criticism erupted as a result of remarks made about Jews by Yves Michaud, a prominent Quebec nationalist public figure; they were interpreted by some as being antisemitic. The remarks were the subject of a swift denunciatory resolution of the Quebec National Assembly. However, support for Michaud's remarks from many other prominent sovereigntists prompted the resignation of Quebec Premier Lucien Bouchard, who had been attempting to build a more inclusive approach to Quebec nationalism. A controversial 2007 resolution of the municipal council of Hérouxville regarding standards of conduct and dress considered "appropriate" for the small community was cited as further evidence of xenophobia in Quebec and prompted a Quebec government inquiry (the Bouchard-Taylor Commission) into the issue of reasonable accommodations of ethnic minorities' cultural differences.

== Examples ==
=== Robert Guy Scully ===
On April 17, 1977, five months after the first accession of the Parti québécois to power, The Washington Post published an op-ed piece, entitled "What It Means to Be French In Canada," by the journalist Robert Guy Scully. Scully wrote: "French Quebec is a culturally deprived, insecure community whose existence is an accident of history." He described Quebecer society as incurably "sick" and pointed to the economic poverty found in the French-speaking eastern part of Montreal: "No one would want to live there who doesn't have to.... There isn't a single material or spiritual advantage to it which can't be had, in an even better form, on the English side of Montreal."

This provocative article was featured in a collection of essays, In the Eye of the Eagle (1990), compiled by Jean-François Lisée. In the chapter "A Voiceless Quebec", Lisée posits if such prominence were given to such "singular and unrepresentative a view of Quebec society," it was partly caused by "the perfect absence of a Quebec voice in North America's news services, and the frightening degree of ignorance in the American press on the subject of Quebec."

=== Esther Delisle ===
Esther Delisle, a French-Canadian PhD student at Université Laval, wrote a thesis that discussed the "fascist" and antisemitic published writings by intellectuals and leading newspapers in Quebec in the decade before World War II. She published a book, The Traitor and the Jew (1992), which was based on that work and examined the articles and beliefs of Lionel Groulx, an important intellectual in the history of French-Canadian Catholicism and nationalism. Groulx is a revered figure to many French Quebecers, who consider him a father of Quebec nationalism, but his works are seldom read today. To separate his political and literary activities from his academic work, Groulx was known to write journalism and novels under numerous pseudonyms. In her book, Delisle claimed that Groulx, under the pseudonym Jacques Brassier, had written in 1933 in L'Action nationale:

Within six months or a year, the Jewish problem could be resolved, not only in Montreal but from one end of the province of Quebec to the other. There would be no more Jews here other than those who could survive by living off one another.

Quebec Premier Jacques Parizeau and numerous other commentators labelled her book as "Quebec bashing." Her work received more coverage from other Quebec journalists. Critics challenged both her conclusions and her methodology. Issues of methodology had been raised initially by some of the professors of her thesis committee, two of whom thought the identified problems had not been corrected. Gérard Bouchard of the Université du Québec à Chicoutimi identified several dozen errors, including incorrect citations and references that could not be found in cited source material. He claims that the text of her book revealed that Delisle had not consulted some of the sources directly.

In a March 1, 1997 cover story titled Le Mythe du Québec fasciste (The Myth of a Fascist Quebec), L'actualité revisited the controversy around Delisle's doctoral thesis and book. The issue also included a profile of Groulx. Authors of both articles acknowledged Groulx's antisemitism and the generally favourable attitude of the Roman Catholic Church towards fascist doctrine during the 1930s. Pierre Lemieux, an economist and author, wrote: "The magazine's attack is much weakened by Claude Ryan, editor of Le Devoir in the 1970s, declaring that he has changed his mind and come close to Delisle's interpretation after reading her book."

However, the same magazine made a claim, which has never been substantiated, that Delisle had been subsidized by Jewish organizations. The claim was repeated on television by a former Parti québécois cabinet minister, Claude Charron, who was introducing a 2002 broadcast on Canal D of Je me souviens, the Eric R. Scott documentary about Delisle's book. Outraged at what both Scott and Delisle called an absolute falsehood, they asked Canal D to rebroadcast the documentary because it was introduced in a way they considered to be defamatory and inaccurate.

Referring to Groulx and to the Le Devoir newspaper, Francine Dubé wrote in the National Post on April 24, 2002, that "the evidence Delisle has unearthed seems to leave no doubt that both were anti-Semitic and racist." In 2002, the Montreal Gazette noted the "anti-Semitism and pro-fascist sympathies that were common among this province's (Quebec) French-speaking elite in the 1930s."

=== Mordecai Richler ===
The well-known Montreal author Mordecai Richler wrote essays in which he decried as racism, tribalism, provincialism, and antisemitism among nationalist politicians in French-speaking Quebec, notably in a 1991 article in The New Yorker and his 1992 book Oh Canada! Oh Quebec!. His negative portrayal of some Quebec government policies was given international coverage in the Western world, where French-speaking Quebecers were heard and read much less often than English Canadians. Richler's views were strongly criticized in Quebec and to some degree by anglophone Canadians.

He notably compared some Quebec nationalist writers in the newspaper Le Devoir in the 1930s to Nazi propagandists in Der Stürmer and criticized the Quebec politician René Lévesque before an American audience. Richler was known as something of a "curmudgeon" in literary circles.

Some commentators, both inside and outside Quebec, thought that the reaction to Richler was excessive and sometimes racist. For example, a Quebecer misinterpreted his passage saying that the Catholic Church treated French Canadian women like "sows" and said that Richler had called Quebec women "sows." Other Quebecers acclaimed Richler for his courage and for attacking the orthodoxies of Quebec society; he was described as "the most prominent defender of the rights of Quebec's anglophones."

=== Don Cherry ===
Don Cherry, a longtime commentator on Hockey Night in Canada, made a few comments interpreted by many Québécers as Quebec bashing. For example, he said in 1993 that the anglophone residents of Sault Ste. Marie, Ontario "speak the good language." During the 1998 Winter Olympic Games, he called Quebec separatists "whiners" after Bloc MPs had complained there were too many Canadian flags in the Olympic village. He said that Jean-Luc Brassard should not be the flag bearer because he was "a French guy, some skier that nobody knows about." In 2003, after fans in Montreal booed the American national anthem, Cherry on an American talk show said that "true Canadians do not feel the way they do in Quebec there." In 2004, while criticizing visors, he said that "most of the guys that wear them are Europeans or French guys!"

Left-leaning politicians, French advocacy groups, and media commentators from Quebec criticized Cherry and CBC Television on numerous occasions after the statements. In 2004 the CBC put Cherry's segment, Coach's Corner, on a seven-second tape delay to review his comments and prevent future incidents.

=== Appointment of David Levine ===
In 1998 David Levine, a former candidate for the Parti Québécois, was appointed as head of the newly amalgamated Ottawa Hospital. The appointment was opposed in English Canada because Levine had been a separatist, which was unrelated to his performance as a hospital administrator. The controversy ended once the hospital board refused to back down, and Prime Minister Jean Chrétien defended freedom of thought in a democratic society. His speech was reinforced by support from the union, the Quebec Liberal Party, and a resolution of the National Assembly of Quebec.

=== Barbara Kay ===
On August 6, 2006, leaders of the Parti québécois and Québec solidaire participated in a rally in support of Lebanon during the 2006 Lebanon War. The rally was billed as being for "justice and peace," but the journalist Barbara Kay described it as "virulently anti-Israel." Three days later, Kay published "The Rise of Quebecistan" in the National Post, claiming that the French-speaking politicians had supported terrorism, Hezbollah, and antisemitism for votes from Canadians of convenience. The Quebec Press Council condemned Barbara Kay's article for "undue provocation" and "generalizations suitable to perpetuate prejudices."

=== Jan Wong ===
On September 13, 2006, a school shooting occurred at Dawson College in Westmount, Quebec, and it resulted in two deaths, including the death of the gunman. Three days later, the national newspaper, The Globe and Mail, published a front-page article by Jan Wong, titled "Get under the desk." In the article, she linked all three school shootings of the last decades in Montreal, including those in 1989 at the École Polytechnique and the 1992 shootings at Concordia University, to the purported alienation brought about by "the decades-long linguistic struggle."

A number of Quebec journalists denounced Wong's article. Michel Vastel, a native Frenchman, wrote in his blog for the newsmagazine L'actualité, that the article was "deceitful racism" with a "repugnant" interpretation. André Pratte (federalist) of La Presse also condemned Wong's article. and a La Presse editorial, journalists Michel C. Auger of Le Journal de Montréal, Michel David and Michel Venne (sovereigntist) of Le Devoir, Alain Dubuc (federalist), Vincent Marissal, Yves Boisvert and Stéphane Laporte of La Presse, Josée Legault (sovereigntist) of The Gazette, Jean-Jacques Samson of Le Soleil, sovereigntist militant and author Patrick Bourgeois of Le Québécois, Gérald Leblanc, retired journalist of La Presse and Joseph Facal, Journal de Montréal columnist and former Parti Québécois minister.

On September 21, 2006, The Globe and Mail published an editorial about the affair. Calling the controversy a "small uproar," it defended the right of the journalist to question such phenomena, the "need to ask hard questions and explore uncomfortable avenues" and stated that she had "merely wondered" whether the marginalization and alienation of the three shooters could be associated with the murders.

=== Disunited States of Canada documentary ===
In 2012, the documentary film "Disunited States of Canada" (Les États-Désunis du Canada) created quite a stir in the Quebec media by recording anti-Quebec sentiments expressed by Western Canadians and by English-speaking media at large. The movie's trailer, "No More Quebec," was viewed 100,000 times in only 24 hours and was then taken up by traditional and social media. In the documentary, Quebeckers are referred to as "thieves," "whiners," and "vermin."

=== 2021 federal election debate ===
In an English language debate during the 2021 Canadian federal election, debate moderator Shachi Kurl asked Bloc Quebecois Leader Yves-Francois Blanchet how: "You deny that Quebec has problems with racism, yet you defend legislation, such as bills 96 and 21, which marginalize religious minorities, anglophones and allophones." Blanchet responded by dismissing the question as an instance of Quebec-bashing, arguing that it painted all Quebecers as racist. Quebec Premier Francois Legault, whose government had introduced the laws mentioned in the question, also dismissed the question as an attack on Quebec. The Quebec legislature would later unanimously condemn the debate question as "Quebec-bashing." Conversely, critics of Bills 96 and 21 accused Blanchet and Legault of using accusations of Quebec-bashing as a deflection from having to defend discriminatory pieces of legislation.

== Reactions ==
=== By English Canadian media and public figures ===
Just as the francophone media respond to tenuous allegations of Quebec-bashing, the mainstream media in English Canada have taken issue with virulent attacks on Quebec and the Québécois. Canadian Prime Minister Stephen Harper was particularly critical about the Jan Wong article that linked the Dawson College shooting incident to allegations of racist attitudes on the part of Quebecers. Critics of "Quebec bashing" argue that Quebec is essentially a tolerant and inclusive society. When Harper's comments about the unsuitability of the Bloc Québécois involvement in the proposed Liberal-NDP coalition in late 2008 were characterized by Professor C.E.S. Franks of Queen's University, Kingston, as "inflammatory and tendentious rhetoric' in a Globe and Mail article in March 2009, The Montreal Gazette responded to the allegation pointing out that immediately after Harper's remarks the Montreal newspaper La Presse had dismissed accusations that the remarks were anti-Quebec. The English Canadian journalist Ray Conlogue has denounced the anti-Quebec press.

=== Allegations of English Canadian racism ===
The journalist Normand Lester wrote three polemic volumes of The Black Book of English Canada in which Quebec-bashing is denounced and in which acts of discrimination, racism, and intolerance towards people who were not white Anglo-Saxon Protestants are itemized. The books have been criticized for sometimes lacking good references. Although some facts cited are not widely known about in French Canada, unlike in English Canada. Lester noted, "It is one of the characteristics of racist discourse to demonize the group that is condemned, all the while giving oneself all virtues, to pretend representing universalism while the group targeted by hateful discourse is denounced as petty, and its demands, without value, anti-democratic and intolerant." The book offered a counterpoint by chronicling the racist and antisemitic history of English Canada. The author argued that Quebec was never more antisemitic than English Canada. Most notably, it underlined the fervent federalist opinions of the fascist leader Adrien Arcand and revealed for the first time that his former National Social Christian Party had been funded by Canadian Prime Minister R. B. Bennett and his Conservative Party (see R. B. Bennett, 1st Viscount Bennett#Controversy). He argued that the fascist party was so marginal that it would never have been viable without the funding. Lester was suspended from his job at Société Radio-Canada for publishing the book. The organization is often accused of Quebec nationalist bias by English-speaking Canada but of Canadian federalism bias by French-Speaking Quebec. Lester subsequently resigned.

=== Complaints to international forums by Quebecers ===
Organizations such as the Saint-Jean-Baptiste Society (SSJB) often lodge formal complaints about perceived misrepresentation. In 1999 Guy Bouthillier, its president, lamented the phenomenon and pointed out that the "right to good reputation" was a recognized right in the Quebec Charter of Human Rights and Freedoms, inspired by the international human rights declarations of the postwar era. In 1998, under the leadership of Gilles Rhéaume, the Mouvement souverainiste du Québec filed a memorandum to the International Federation of Human Rights in Paris that mentioned anti-Quebec press articles. In 2000, Rhéaume filed a memorandum to the United Nations regarding "violations by Canada of the political rights of Quebecers," including media defamation. He also founded the Ligue québécoise contre la francophobie canadienne ("Quebec league against Canadian Francophobia") explicitly to defend against "Quebec bashing."

=== Petition against Francophobia ===
The Société Saint-Jean-Baptiste de Montréal released a report on December 12, 2013, "United Against Francophobia." Its total of 101 cosignatories, including Bernard Landry and Pierre Curzi, urged that Francophobia should be fought against, because Francophobia is a growing worldwide trend, according to the SJBM. The petition denounced many incidents when the Quebec sovereignty movement was compared to the Nazi regime and it also denounced many English media outlets and many social media sites such as Facebook, including some recent pages which were titled "I hate Pauline Marois" (retitled "Down With Pauline Marois") and another page which was titled "The Lac-Mégantic train disaster was hilarious."

== Debate ==
Examples of anti-Quebec coverage in English Canada are recognized by a number of French-speaking people in Quebec, but whether or not that coverage is a wide phenomenon which is reflective of an opinion which is held by many people in English Canada is subject to debate. Chantal Hébert noted that commentators such as Graham Fraser, Jeffrey Simpson and Paul Wells, who are more positive with regard to Quebec, were frequently called upon by the Canadian media since the 1995 referendum. She also noted that Edward Greenspon, editor-in-chief of The Globe and Mail, ended up defending an alleged instance of Quebec bashing in 2006, Globe and Mail columnist Jan Wong's "Get under the desk".

Graham Fraser, an English Canadian journalist who is noted for his sympathy for Quebec, has tempered both sides. He wrote, "This phenomenon (of English Canadian Francophobia) exists, I do not doubt it; I have read enough of Alberta Report to know that there are people that think bilingualism is a conspiracy against English Canadians to guarantee jobs for Quebecers—who are all bilingual, anyway. ... I have heard enough call-in radio shows to know that these sentiments of fear and rage are not confined to the Canadian west. But I do not think these anti-francophone prejudices dominate the Canadian culture." Fraser, in fact, was himself named as Canada's new Official Languages Commissioner in September 2006.

Maryse Potvin has attributed the debate about Quebec-bashing to "the obsession with national identity which, on the one side, is articulated around the reinforcement of the federal state, the Charter, and a mythified version of the Canadian multicultural project, and which, on the other side, is based on a logic of ideological victimization and crystallization of the political project." She called on intellectuals, politicians, and the media to emphasize the common values of the two national visions.

== See also ==
- Anti-Catholicism
- Anti-French sentiment, worldwide
- Linguistic discrimination
- Orange Order in Canada, anti-French group
- "I Am Not Canadian"
- Racism in Canada
- Speak White
- Le Livre noir du Canada anglais
- Quebec federalist ideology
- Quebec sovereignty movement
- English-speaking Quebecers
- 2012 Montreal shooting
- French immersion in Canada
- French language in Canada
  - Franco-Albertans
  - Franco-Columbian
  - Franco-Newfoundlander
  - Franco-Ontarian
  - Franco-Quebecer
  - Fransaskois, in Saskatchewan
  - Franco-Yukonnais
- Official bilingualism in Canada
  - Timeline of official languages policy in Canada
  - Minister responsible for Official Languages (Canada)
  - Ministry of Francophone Affairs
