= Jan Wong controversy =

2006 Canadian media controversy

The Jan Wong controversy refers to a claim made by Jan Wong on September 16, 2006, three days after a shooting at Dawson College in Montreal. Canada's nationally distributed newspaper of record, The Globe and Mail, published a front-page article titled, "Get under the desk," by Jan Wong. In the article, Ms. Wong controversially linked all three Quebec school shootings of the last two decades—1989 École Polytechnique Massacre (15 deaths), 1992 Concordia University Massacre (4 deaths), and 2006 Dawson College Shooting (2 deaths)—to the purported alienation brought about by "the decades-long linguistic struggle" within the province. Public outcry and political condemnation soon followed in many venues. In response, a Globe and Mail editorial attempted to minimize the controversy as a "small uproar" over journalistic freedom, but this caused further condemnation. Jan Wong maintained her perspective and wrote extensively about the whole experience in her book Out of the Blue, A Memoir of Workplace Depression, Recovery, Redemption and, Yes, Happiness.

== Article ==
Wong suggested that the school shootings might have been related to the fact that the perpetrators were not old-stock French Québécois: (Marc Lépine was half-Algerian, Valery Fabrikant was a Russian Jew, and Kimveer Gill was of Indian heritage); and they had been alienated by a Quebec society concerned with "racial purity." Citing the history of the use of the antiquated term "pure laine," ("pure wool"), Wong postulated the existence of a uniquely Québécois brand of racism, writing: "Elsewhere, to talk of racial ‘purity’ is repugnant. Not in Quebec."

The article also portrayed school shootings in Canada as a Quebec phenomenon, citing Jan Bryan, columnist for the Montreal Gazette, saying, "Three doesn’t mean anything. But three out of three in Quebec means something." It also presented the Montreal anglophone community as a small-town, close-knit community.

== Public reaction ==
Hundreds of letters of complaints were received by The Globe and Mail. As in Barbara Kay's case, the Saint-Jean-Baptiste Society (SSJB) lodged a complaint to the Quebec Press Council. SSJB president Jean Dorion declared "There is no obsession for racial purity in Quebec, definitely not. [...] The expression 'pure laine' is absolutely obsolete." The blogosphere soon saw a flood of posts against Wong's allegations.

Wong received hate mail, including racist comments about her Chinese ethnicity and post containing excrement. She also received a death threat that resulted in Wong's family contacting the police.

== Journalistic reaction ==
A number of Quebec journalists denounced Wong's article. French-born journalist Michel Vastel, in his blog for the news magazine L'actualité, called the article "deceitful racism" and the interpretation "repugnant". His opposition was advanced again in a following Journal de Québec piece by Vastel. Wong's article was condemned by federalist La Presse editorialist André Pratte (in a letter to the Globe and a La Presse editorial), journalists Michel C. Auger of Le Journal de Montréal, Michel David and Michel Venne (sovereigntist) of Le Devoir, Alain Dubuc (federalist), Vincent Marissal, Yves Boisvert and Stéphane Laporte of La Presse, Josée Legault (sovereigntist) of The Gazette, Jean-Jacques Samson of Le Soleil, sovereigntist militant and author Patrick Bourgeois of Le Québécois, Gérald Leblanc, retired journalist of La Presse and Joseph Facal, Journal de Montréal columnist and former Parti Québécois minister.

Although the Gazette called it "nonsense" in an editorial, it found the reaction to be out of proportion, as did Lysiane Gagnon from La Presse, who nonetheless called the theory "delirious". Gazette journalist Don Macpherson wrote: "By the standards of Wong’s article, one could just as easily blame the [three] shootings on federalism, since all three happened to occur while the Quebec Liberals were in power". He advanced that, on the contrary, the tragedy and the controversy around Wong's article had shown a remarkable unity between French and English-speaking Quebecers. Barbara Kay, author of the "Quebecistan" controversy, herself criticized Wong, calling the analysis "bullshit". Jack Jedwab, Executive Director of the Association for Canadian Studies in Montreal and former Executive Director of the Quebec Region of the Canadian Jewish Congress, noted that the expression "pure laine" was "no longer quite common". He also called the analysis "nonsense". The Globe and Mail remarked that "[i]n English Canada, unsurprisingly, the response has been considerably more muted". However, on September 28, 2006, Warren Kinsella wrote a harsh criticism of Wong's work in The National Post. Kinsella was born in Montreal.

== Political reaction ==
Micheline Labelle, director of the Centre de recherche sur l’immigration, l’ethnicité et la citoyenneté (CRIEC, "Centre for research on immigration, ethnicity and citizenship") at the Université du Québec à Montréal stated that she saw in the arguments something akin to "neoracism", that is to say, a generalization of a cultural trait applied to a given population. "For less than that, minorities go to the courts", she said.

On September 19, 2006, the Canadian Press reported that federalist Premier of Quebec Jean Charest demanded an apology, calling the article a "disgrace". He sent an open letter to the Globe vigorously defending Quebec's society and its language protection.

In this kind of situation, anyone who ventures to put forward explanations or comparisons at the very least risks making a fool of himself. Jan Wong has certainly discredited herself with her gamble.

I was shocked and disappointed by the narrow-minded analysis published in the Saturday, September 16 edition, in which Ms Wong sought to identify the affirmation of French culture in Québec as the deeper cause of the Dawson College shootings and the killings at the Polytechnique in 1989.
Quebecers make up less than 3% of the North American population. Over the centuries, through the vicissitudes of history, we have managed to preserve our language and culture, and in so doing, cherished the highest democratic ideals. Every year, we welcome tens of thousands of individuals from the four corners of the earth, people who contribute to building a free society in Québec, a society that is proud of its difference. [...]

Ms Wong’s article is a disgrace. It betrays an ignorance of Canadian values and a profound misunderstanding of Québec. She should have the decency to apologize to all Quebecers.

Conservative Prime Minister of Canada Stephen Harper described Wong's argument as "without foundation". He sent the Globe a similar letter. "These actions (the killings) deserve our unqualified moral condemnation, not an excuse for printing prejudices masked in the language of social theory," Harper wrote. Parti Québécois leader André Boisclair declared that the journalist had, on the intellectual level, "slipped into the dregs" ("glissé dans les bas fonds"). Former Premier of Quebec Bernard Landry declared to La Tribune "if she is of good faith, she will have to apologize [...] It is incredible that it is still possible today to convey such delirious opinions on Quebec. Especially in an era when Quebec is more cosmopolitan than ever. [...] It is insulting for Quebec and dishonouring for Canada. In the same way as if I saw a similar article about Ontario in La Tribune, I would be ashamed for La Tribune."

Cameroon-born Bloc Québécois Member of Parliament Maka Kotto issued a declaration at the House of Commons of Canada stating "to pretend that there could be a link of any kind of cause-and-effect between the dramatic episode of Dawson College and Bill 101—described as infamous by the journalist—pertains of a defamatory delirium disconnected from the Quebec reality. [...] Quebec is an inclusive, welcoming society where it is pleasant to live. As an immigrant, I felt very rapidly welcome there and I deplore that the openness of the Quebec people can be put into question." He invited the federal government to denounce the writings of Jan Wong as well. On September 20 the House of Commons unanimously passed a motion requesting an apology "to the Quebec people" for the column. Denis Coderre, the Liberal MP who tabled the motion, called the column "classless". "People feel there's a sort [...] of trend.", he said. "I think that it's enough. We're not "Quebecistan", we're not a people that ostracizes, we're a model of integration." Coderre was in the group of politicians attacked by Barbara Kay in the "Quebecistan" controversy, also accused of "Quebec bashing". Marie-Hélène Paradis, press attaché of Quebec Minister of Immigration Lise Thériault, said "No data can support what Ms. Wong advances." She declared that such allegations feed "the type of fast judgements that lead to discrimination."

Despite having voted for the motion, Conservative Member of Parliament Daniel Petit declared that there might be a link, as Wong suggested. "I think that the billion [dollars] that we put in [the Canadian gun registry] should have been put into education and integration of immigrants in Montreal", Petit said. Dimitri Soudas, press attaché for Conservative Prime Minister Harper, said "The comments of Mr. Petit are unacceptable, he should retract them and it does not reflect in any case the position of the government", adding that Petit was met by the Prime Minister's cabinet on the subject. MPs of the House of Commons criticized him for his statements, including Michel Gauthier, of the Bloc Québécois, and Denis Coderre, of the Liberal Party of Canada, who demanded apologies. He offered them promptly. "I made inappropriate remarks," Petit said in a statement. "I withdraw them entirely because you cannot draw any link between the integration of immigrants in Quebec and the terrible tragedy at Dawson College."

== Globe and Mail editorial response ==
On September 21, 2006, The Globe and Mail published an editorial on the affair. Calling the controversy a "small uproar", it defended the right of the journalist to question such phenomena, the "need to ask hard questions and explore uncomfortable avenues", saying that it "merely wondered". The editor claimed not to be surprised by the hundreds of letters of protest received, including those of First Ministers Charest and Harper. The editorial validated Wong's claims of alienation in Quebec, which the Globe called "politics of exclusion". Asking whether this exclusion led to marginalization and perhaps alienation, it said that the answer is "arguable". However, it called the marginalization and alienation of the three shooters "obvious". About whether it could be associated with the murders, it answered that "[n]o such evidence exists". In a sentence apparently intended to balance the assertions, it implied at the same time that an even worse discrimination existed in the Quebec of the past, as it wrote: "By the same token, it would be remiss to forget that today’s Quebec is not the Quebec of yesteryear." The Globe and Mail did not issue an apology for Jan Wong's piece, as requested by many, including the unanimous House of Commons.

=== Reactions to the editorial ===
Leader of the Bloc Québécois Gilles Duceppe declared that he considered the editorial an attempt at justification. "It even suggests there might be some problems in Quebec because of the language laws. It's unacceptable and it's deplorable and it's shameful for a newspaper of that stature", he said. "Try imagining the opposite—If I'd made such nonsensical, absurd remarks (about English Canada). Then all the editorial writers across Canada would get involved." Premier of Quebec Jean Charest was said to be disappointed by The Globe and Mail response. He was also said to be offended by the little consideration the paper gave his open letter, that was published in the readers' opinion page (like the one from Prime Minister Harper). "The (House of Commons) motion is totally ignored", said the Premier's press attaché. On September 23, 2006, the Canadian Press reported that Edward Greenspon, editor of The Globe and Mail, expressed regrets. In a The Globe and Mail column, without making formal apologies, he wrote that the personal opinions of Wong should have been excised from the piece, not because they were unacceptable, but because they constituted a "thesis", not a "statement of fact". He wrote that "they should have been put into a separate piece clearly marked opinion". He however believed the reaction to be clearly disproportionate. Despite Greenspon's insinuation that the piece was not "clearly marked opinion", it had in fact been accompanied by a headshot of Wong, the traditional means of designating opinion pieces.

== Jan Wong's response ==
Jan Wong declined the invitation of host Guy A. Lepage to explain herself at the popular Québécois talk show Tout le monde en parle. She has declared: "I brought forward a point of view [...] and I maintain it." She has claimed that, during the controversy, she was the target of sexist and racist attacks, citing a Le Devoir cartoon that caricatured Wong with glasses and buck teeth opening a fortune cookie that said "Beware of Bill 101". The newspaper claimed that it was a reference to the Chinese restaurants of her well-known father, Bill Wong, not her ethnicity. Jan Wong wrote extensively about the whole experience in her book Out of the Blue, A Memoir of Workplace Depression, Recovery, Redemption and Yes, Happiness. In it, Jan Wong described in detail the backlash she received immediately after her article published, how the Globe and Mail management, in her view, abandoned her in front of the torrent of negative reactions from all sides, and how she spiraled down into depression. She described when she found the ‘exact moment I began my descent into depression’ when she was shattered by racial attack. This book was self-published after Doubleday, the publisher of her previous books, pulled out mere days before print although Doubleday denied any legal interference from The Globe. It was released on May 5, 2012.

== Bouchard-Taylor Commission ==
The term "Québécois de souche" continued to be used in both English and French media. And in 2007, the Bouchard-Taylor Commission included the recommendation that the use of the expression "Québécois de souche" be ended and replaced with the term "Quebecers of French-Canadian origin." The Commission investigated reasonable accommodation of immigrants into Quebec society.

According to David Austin, author of Fear of a Black Nation, (2013) which was based on Austin's two decades of inquiry including interviews and international archival research,

"Québecois has conventionally been used to signify the descendants of Québec settlers from France, the majority habitants of the province, who are otherwise referred to as pure laine (pure wool) or Québecois de souche (of the base of the tree, or root). However, the changing face of Québec's increasingly diverse population challenges the privileged place of those French descendants and calls for a more inclusive notion of what it means to be Québecois or a Quebecer."

— David Austin

== See also ==
- Anti-Quebec sentiment
