= Barbara Kay controversy =

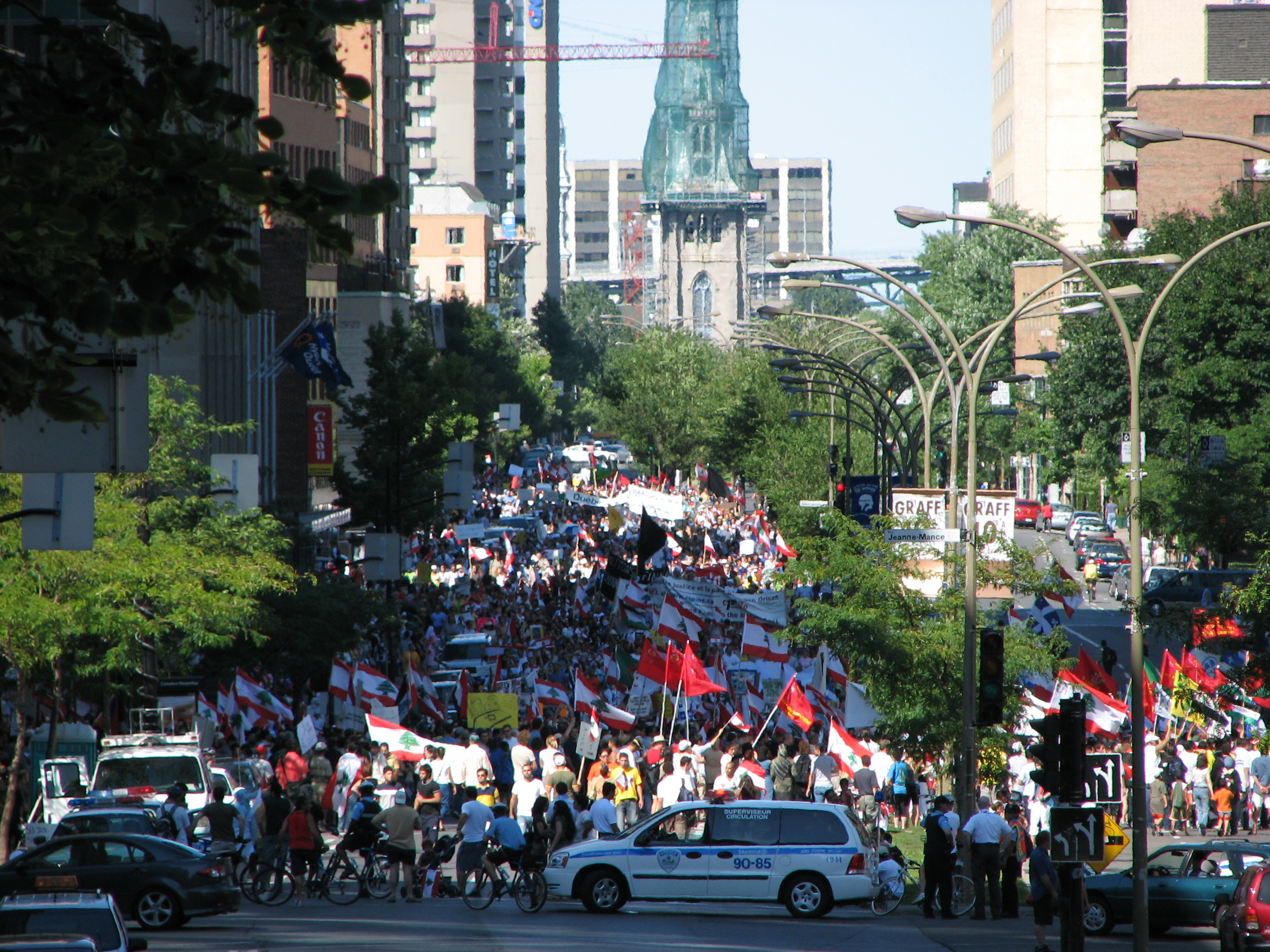
A view looking down on the August 6, 2006 demonstration in Montreal.

Barbara Kay is a columnist for the Canadian national broadsheet the National Post, wherein she expressed, in a series of three articles, beginning with a column entitled "The Rise of Quebecistan", on August 9, 2006, her concern at the involvement of Quebec politicians in a demonstration in support of Lebanon during the 2006 Israel-Lebanon conflict that took place on August 6, 2006, in the city of Montreal, Quebec, Canada. Kay wrote: "'The Rise of Quebecistan,' has become a focus for great controversy in Quebec. In the past week, I have been interviewed by numerous radio stations, both French and English, and declared an enemy of the people, in so many words, in no less than three newspapers, including in a Post column... ."

Kay claimed that the fact both she, and what she described as her "criticism" of the demonstration, were attacked by elements of the French Quebec media and politicians—some of whom support the separation of the province of Quebec from Canada—was seemingly because her criticisms were expressed in the English language, and not French.

In July 2020, Kay resigned from the National Post, blaming "increased editorial scrutiny of her columns", but returned in October 2020.

== "Virulently anti-Israel rally" ==
On August 6, 2006, Parti Québécois (PQ) leader André Boisclair, Bloc Québécois (BQ) leader Gilles Duceppe, Québec solidaire (QS) spokesperson Amir Khadir and Liberal Party of Canada Member of Parliament (MP) Denis Coderre participated in a rally in opposition to Israel's actions in the 2006 Israel-Lebanon conflict. The event was described by Kay as: "... a virulently anti-Israel rally, and scattered amongst the crowd were a number of Hezbollah flags and placards." Kay wrote of the four politicians that participated in the rally:

All four, along with prominent Quebec union leaders, signed a manifesto that did not condemn Hezbollah's aggression, then endorsed and willingly undertook a dominant role in a march at which Hezbollah flags were in evidence, along with placards, reading "Juifs assassins," [translation: Jewish assassins], (not "Israelis" – Jews), "Nous sommes tous Hezbollah," [translation: We are all Hezbollah], "Longue vie a Nasrallah," [translation: Long life to Nasrallah], "Vive le Hezbollah," [translation: Long live Hezbollah]. Gleeful separatist cineaste Pierre Falardeau was photographed brandishing a fleur-de-lys in one hand, a Hezbollah flag in the other. Graffiti on a building read: "God f--- the Jews." A Jewish prayer shawl was torn to pieces.

Kay wrote that these Quebec politicians participated in the rally despite Hezbollah being an organization officially classified as a terrorist group by the Canadian government. She also asserted that the rally's organizing committee "deliberately excluded a Jewish presence", which was "in itself an anti-Semitic act and a warning to any politician, whose business it is to remain neutral in affairs of this kind, to stay away." The rally also didn't call for "peace" but a cease fire or hudna. Kay asked: "If these signs had read: 'We are all KKK,' 'Long life to Osama bin Laden,' 'We are all Nazis,' 'Women are pigs,' would these same leaders have turned the blind eye they did at the time? Hezbollah's mission is to eradicate Jews—not just Israelis—from the earth." And Kay felt that the involvement of politicians in the rally was troubling: "It is true that similar marches have taken place in other cities. The difference is that politicians in Toronto and elsewhere in Canada do not march at the head of these hatefests."

Kay commented on the motivations of the politicians, noting:

Their cultural and historical sympathy for Arab countries from the francophonie – Morocco, Algeria, Lebanon – joined with reflexive anti-Americanism and a fat streak of anti-Semitism that has marbled the intellectual discourse of Quebec throughout its history, has made Quebec the most anti-Israel of the provinces, and therefore the most vulnerable to tolerance for Islamist terrorist sympathizers.

Kay speculated that these politicians may also have been cynically seeking votes from Canadians of convenience asserting:

These politicians are playing a dangerous game. They have no political support from Jews (who are all federalists), so have nothing to lose in courting anti-Israel Arab groups. There are at least 50,000 Lebanese-Canadians in the Montreal area. We can expect those numbers to swell as Hezbollah-supporting residents of southern Lebanon cash in on their Canadian citizenship and flee to the safety of Quebec. Under the circumstances, it may be politically convenient for some left-wing Quebec politicians to stoke fires of enthusiasm for Hezbollah – an organization officially classified as a terrorist group by the Canadian government. Yet it would be disastrous for the future of the province.

She concluded her second editorial on the subject as follows:

The complicity of politicians, not with terrorism itself, but with those who support terrorism, indicates a penchant for appeasement of hateful attitudes... Quebec politicians and union leaders have, by their silence and weakness and acts of overt complicity, legitimated rather than defused anti-Jewish sentiment in Quebec. For this reason, I stand behind my previous statement that Quebec in the hands of these people might very well become a Quebecistan.

== Criticism of Kay ==
Quebec politicians defended their participation in the impugned rally. Gilles Duceppe stated that he was there in the interest of Israel and Lebanese civilian populations alike and André Boisclair said the Hezbollah flag had no place in Quebec. A press release from Duceppe's Bloc Québécois pointed out the presence of Jews at the rally and noted that Duceppe's presence was conditional on no pro-Hezbollah demonstrators and no anti-Israel slogans. Duceppe also indicated that the Bloc and others tried to get Hezbollah supporters to leave the event.

Montreal journalist Mark Abley also criticized Kay's piece, noting that both Duceppe and Coderre called for an immediate ceasefire and the disarming of Hezbollah in their speeches. He also indicated that Hezbollah banners were described by those in attendance as "few and far between", and described Kay's categorization of the rally as "Hezbollah-dominated" as "intellectually untrue".

The French Saint-Jean-Baptiste Society lodged a complaint regarding Kay's piece to the Quebec Press Council. Kay was criticized by La Presse French Canadian editorialist and "federalist" André Pratte and The Gazette "sovereigntist"-columnist and French Canadian Josée Legault, as well as La Presse French Canadian journalist Vincent Marissal. The Montreal French-language daily La Presse, on August 7, 2006, (p. A4), contended: "Aucun drapeau du mouvement chiite controversé n'était visible durant la marche." (Translation: "No flag of the controversial Shia movement was visible during the march"). French Canadian activist Gilles Rhéaume announced his intention to lodge a complaint to the police for hate speech. William Tetley, a McGill University professor and past Robert Bourassa provincial cabinet minister, wrote a letter to The National Post where he stated that, as an anglophone, he viewed Quebec society as holding a long-standing tolerance toward Jews by asserting that, at a time when his own English-language McGill University imposed quotas on Jews, the French-language Université de Montréal welcomed Jews.

The French-Canadian premier of the province of Quebec Jean Charest called the expression "Quebecistan" "une grossièreté" (something rude, crude, a "vulgarity"). However, he also stated that "No one in my government supports Hezbollah," and that he would not participate in a demonstration where there was a Hezbollah flag.

== Kay's supporters ==
Reacting to the controversy, National Post Comment Pages Editor, and Kay's son, Jonathan Kay declared that his newspaper had no reason to offer apologies. In a statement to La Presse, he asserted that "[t]here is no doubt that Quebec has an antisemitic past." Barbara Kay was also defended by Howard Galganov and Ottawa Citizen French Canadian journalist Brigitte Pellerin.

Beryl Wajsman, the president of the Institute for Public Affairs of Montreal, wrote an article in the Canadian Free Press (CFP) in support of Kay.

== Quebec Press Council decision ==
In 2007, the Quebec Press Council released a decision condemning Kay for "undue provocation" and "generalizations suitable to perpetuate prejudices".

The Council noted throughout the chronicle of Mrs. Kay a lack of rigour in the presentation of the context surrounding the walk for peace of August 2006, which tends to encourage the reader to lend intentions to public personalities without providing concrete facts to support these intentions. On several occasions in the chronicle, the journalist deformed facts, to present only a part of the situation, aiming only at supporting her point of view that the leaders of independent Quebec would withdraw the Hezbollah of the list of the terrorist movements and that this new country would become a harbour for them. The Council points out that, if the chroniclers can denounce with strength the ideas and the actions which they reject and carry judgements with complete freedom, nothing however authorizes them to deteriorate facts to justify interpretation that they draw. Deontology of the Council Press clearly established that the media and the professionals of information must avoid cultivating or to maintain the prejudices. They must imperatively avoid using, at the place of the people or the groups, the representations or the terms which tend to raise the contempt, to run up against the dignity of a person or a category of people because of a discriminatory reason. The Council estimated that the remarks of the journalist were equivalent to an undue provocation, in addition to establishing generalizations suitable to perpetuate the prejudices rather than to dissipate them.

=== Kay's response ===
Kay later responded that while the QPC claimed she was guilty of "undue provocation", it never defined the term "undue". She also stated that the while QPC claimed she was guilty of "altering the facts" upon which she based her opinions, it never cited any specific facts that she had allegedly altered. Kay explained that the National Post viewed the QPC's "verdict" as a "mere irritation" since the QPC had no power to take any action against her beyond issuing statements. However, Kay stated that she took the QPC's statement very seriously because:

I quickly realized that my opinion piece would never have been published in a Quebec-based newspaper. Representatives from all the mainstream media sit on the QPC, and they would all know instinctively what would pass muster and what wouldn't. So in fact, even though the council has no legal power, it has strong moral power amongst its constituents. So they self-censure before they publish.

Kay added that this episode was:

A reminder to other journalists to stay away from the sensitive issues I had the freedom to raise because I wrote for a medium beyond the reach of the QPC's ability to intimidate.
