= Truther =

Truther may refer to:

- 9/11 truth movement member or believer
- Truther, a believer in conspiracy theories

== See also ==
- Among the Truthers, a 2011 book about conspiracy theorists
- Birtherism
