= Barbara Kay =

Canadian columnist

- Born: 1943 (age 82–83)
- Education: University of Toronto; McGill University
- Occupation: Columnist
- Spouse: Ronny Kay
- Children: 2, including Jonathan Kay
- Relatives: Anne Golden (sister)
- Website: www.barbarakay.ca

Barbara Kay (born 1943) is a Canadian columnist for the conservative newspaper The National Post. She also writes a weekly column for The Post Millennial and a monthly column for the Epoch Times.

== Early life and education ==
Kay was born in 1943 to an "intensely patriotic" American mother from Detroit, Michigan, and a Canadian father from Toronto.

Kay's paternal grandparents and four of their children emigrated from Poland to Canada in 1917. They settled near a synagogue congregation of immigrants from Poland where they found a supportive Jewish immigrant community. Her grandfather bought and sold "junk from a horse-drawn cart" to Yiddish-speaking customers, and although the family was poor and Zaide never learned English, they never felt "isolated or despised". Although only one of Kay's father's siblings went to university, all of them "ended up solidly in the middle class." Barbara Kay's cousins, including the girls, were "university educated" and had successful, prosperous careers. One of Kay's sisters is Canadian public administrator Anne Golden.

Barbara Kay and her sisters grew up in Forest Hill Village, Toronto, a "posh" neighbourhood. They went to the public preparatory schools, then Forest Hill Collegiate Institute (FHCI). While Kay wrote that her generation did not experience anti-Semitism, according to the Globe and Mail, the Oakdale Golf & Country Club in North York, Toronto, where Kay spent her leisure hours as a youth, was established by "Jews who had been blackballed by the Rosedale Golf Club". In 2004, Canadian historian Irving Abella, who co-authored None Is Too Many: Canada and the Jews of Europe 1933–1948 wrote that the clubs—like the Rosedale Golf Club—were the "last bastions of restriction".

Kay studied at the University of Toronto where she earned an undergraduate degree in English literature. She received a Master of Arts from McGill University in 1966 and subsequently taught literature at Concordia University and several CEGEPs.

== Career ==
Kay began her journalism career as a book reviewer. During the 1990s, she joined the board and writing staff of the revived Cité libre. Afterward, Kay branched out into writing op/eds for the National Post before becoming a columnist in 2003. Kay has also published articles in The Post Millennial, Pajama, The Walrus, Canadian Jewish News (CJNews), and Epoch Times. Barbara Kay joined Ezra Levant's conservative online media channel Rebel News, in February 2017, as its Montreal correspondent. Kay announced on Twitter on August 15, 2017, that she would end her "freelance relationship with Rebel Media. She stated her respect for Ezra Levant and Faith Goldy, but felt that the Rebel Media "brand" had been "tarnished" by several contributors who did not reflect the views of mainstream conservatives like herself.

Kay held a residency on CBC's Because News for nineteen months from 2016 to 2017 as a "token" and only conservative on a panel of liberals. She was removed from the panel allegedly because of "her views on the misappropriation of Indigenous cultures."

Kay briefly left the National Post in 2020, citing increased editorial scrutiny of her columns, but returned a few months later.

== Affiliations ==
Kay was on the Board of Governors of the conservative student newspaper The Prince Arthur Herald, which published from 2011 until 2019, and is on the Canadian Institute for Jewish Research's advisory board.

== Topics ==
=== Pro-Israel ===
Kay is on the advisory board of the Canadian Institute for Jewish Research (CIJR), a pro-Israel think tank established in 1988. In 2007, faced with an increase in anti-Semitism, anti-Israelism and anti-Zionism on university campuses, CIJR launched the Student Israel-Advocacy Seminars Program. Kay wrote that the Israeli Apartheid Week, an American import, was part of a larger movement growing in anticipation of the May 14, 2008, 60th anniversary of Israel's founding.

In a 2017 article, "Kay vs Kay", mother and son, Jonathan Kay, explore generational differences in their relationship to Judaism. To Barbara Kay, by 2017 anti-Zionism was "rooted in anti-Semitism". She describes those "who are aligned with the hard left" as "anti-Zionist and supportive of the Boycott, Divestment and Sanctions(BDS) movement", with the worst of these "confined to university campuses." To her this is a "serious concern globally". She was dismayed that a German court "found that the Muslim firebombers of a synagogue in Wuppertal were not guilty of a hate crime because they had been motivated by anti-Zionism and events in the Middle East." Jonathan Kay, wrote that "Barbara is stuck in a time warp and seems to think we still live in the era when Svend Robinson, Antonia Zerbisias and Naomi Klein are still loud and influential voices in the arena of Canadian foreign policy ... The idea that Canada's intelligentsia is a seething mass of anti-Zionist agitation is about 15 years out of date ... the issue of Zionism has so totally consumed Jewish advocacy groups in the West, that it has created what is, in effect, a spiritual faith unto itself, complete with its own forms of excommunication, liturgy and revealed truth."

=== Feminism ===
While Kay acknowledges that the feminism of the 1960s had "worthy ideals" of empowering women, she wrote in 2004 that the feminist movement had been "hijacked by special interest groups nursing extreme-grievance agendas". "Angry lesbians" and "man-haters" renounced heterosexuality, "traditional marriage, and parental influence over children". "Radical Marxist/feminists" dominated Women's Studies on campus".

=== Honour killings ===
Writing for the National Post, Kay offered the opinion that honour killing is not strictly a Muslim phenomenon and that it is enabled by factors including sexism, dowries and a lack of a dependable legal system. Nevertheless, Kay says that the murders are a Muslim phenomenon in the West, where 95% of honour killings are perpetrated by "Muslim fathers and brothers or their proxies". Kay warns that females do not dissent as one might expect either: The women may describe victims of honour killing as having needed punishment.

=== Anti-communism ===
Kay traces her anti-communism to the mid-1950s when her family, like many other Canadian families, considered building a "well-stocked bomb shelter" in preparation for a nuclear attack from the Soviet Union. Kay who was a young teenager at the time was "existentially" shaken by the possibility of that a "monstrous totalitarian" communist regime might attack the "freedom-loving West". Her hatred of totalitarianism and communism was fueled by a "positive exposure to capitalism" and by books that she read, such as George Orwell's Animal Farm (1945) and Nineteen Eighty-Four (1949), Arthur Koestler's Darkness at Noon (1940), Ayn Rand's Anthem (1946), and Aleksandr Solzhenitsyn's One Day in the Life of Ivan Denisovich (1962). In the 1960s Kay, who was by then a married graduate student at McGill University in Montreal in the 1960s, took no interest in campus politics or indeed any extra-curricular campus life.

Kay's husband Ronny was born in China in 1944. The most enduring memory from his childhood was the sight of liberating American soldiers in Jeeps rolling through the streets of Shanghai. Ronny Kay was passionately pro-American and aggressively anti-communist. When his family immigrated to Canada, he was nine years old and only spoke Russian and English. His parents, who only spoke Russian at home until 1960, and had relatives living in Russia, became part of the Russian immigrant community in Montreal, Quebec. He learned English at school. His "hatred of Communism was implacable, absolute, more visceral" than [Kay's]. Kay and her husband were newly weds attending McGill University as graduate students in the early 1960s when the Quebec nationalist group Front de libération du Québec (FLQ), a "small violent group" "high on Marxist, revolutionary cant" began detonating dozens of bombs targeting English-speaking Québécois. While doing his MBA, her husband was co-editor of the McGill Daily along with Patrick MacFadden, who Kay described as a "militant Irish firebrand" and "more or less a card-carrying Communist". In contrast, her husband "whose Russian heritage had opened a privileged window on the realities of Soviet triumphalism, was a Reagan-style "evil-empirist" avant la lettre."

=== Identity politics ===
In an article in which she compared contemporary identity politics with communism, Kay questioned the erection of an 18-foot bronze statue of Karl Marx, commemorating the 200th anniversary of his birth in Trier, Germany. (Note: Marxism–Leninism, in its most narrow definition—where Karl Marx's and Vladimir Lenin's theories were redefined by Joseph Stalin in the late 1920s—was established by Stalin as the ideology of the Communist International and the Soviet Union. See Allan Bullock and Stephan Trombley's 1999 publication, The New Fontana Dictionary of Modern Thought.) Citing the 1949 publication The God That Failed by former communist writers who denounced communism, Kay wrote that the book has "much to say about their identity-politics cultural cousins of today, and explained why we—classic liberals and conservatives—don't have common ground for discussion or debate with them." Kay cites a former member of the Communist Party, Aileen S. Kraditor, whose 1988 publication described the inner workings of the mind of a rank-and-file communist. Communists [and those who promote identity politics], believe that "facts [are] contingent on dogma". They are so strongly possessed by an ideology, that the ideology "determines what they accept as evidence. Facts and logic can never make them change their fundamental worldview as long as the need for it remains as the organizing principle of their personalities."

In her article about Sarina Singh, published just before Kay participated in a July 2018 panel discussion on free speech organized by Singh, Kay described how Singh had left her job as social worker, where she had worked for twenty-two years in a shelter, and broke with feminism. Singh who had been a "social-justice warrior", an "ardent feminist" who worked in social work, a "field dominated by feminist premises", became a "free speech champion". Singh refused to "see the world through the lens of ideology, identity politics or political correctness". (Note: On her website, Singh described the reasons for leaving social work in April 2017 as "due to stress related to the insufferable neo-cultural Marxist postmodernist agenda that has taken over all aspects of the social work profession. An ideology which views the world through the lens of the oppressed and the oppressor. An ideology which dispenses any notions of objective truth or morality and now dictates policy and law in our legal, educational and political institutions. Workers are compelled to kowtow to a very limited narrative that is rooted in radical feminism and failure to do will have professional consequences.")

=== Free speech ===
In her May 2017 article, Kay defended Frances Widdowson, (Note: Calgary-based Mount Royal College's Widdowson, a co-author (along with her husband) of Disrobing the Aboriginal Industry: The Deception Behind Indigenous Cultural Preservation (2008) was invited by Lindsay Shepherd's newly-formed Laurier Society for Open Inquiry (LSOI) as part of their "Unpopular Opinion Speaker Series" to give a speech) as the "lone academic" challenging Canada's Truth and Reconciliation Commission (TRC)'s conclusions and methodologies, such as oral histories. Widdowson said "[w]hile obviously there were serious problems with the schools that must be recognized and discussed, so as to avoid future educational deficiencies, labelling the schools as 'cultural genocide' prevents us from probing deeper into the structural reasons for the failings of these institutions".

== Controversies ==
In 2006, Kay was criticized for a series of articles accusing Quebec politicians of supporting Hezbollah during the 2006 Israel–Lebanon conflict. She coined the term Quebecistan. In 2007, the Quebec Press Council released a decision condemning Kay for "undue provocation" and "generalizations suitable to perpetuate prejudices".

In 2007, she wrote a column titled "Not in my backyard, either" in which she criticized Hasidic Jews for not integrating into the neighbourhoods in which they live and for being "self-segregating" and "cult-like". In 2008, Kay criticized the behaviour of the Hasidim towards the Deputy Mayor of Richmond Hill, Ontario, Brenda Hogg, who attended the Menorah-lighting Hanukkah. Kay wrote that if the rabbis, whom she called "black hats", cannot observe "small courtesies" then they should "stay in their self-wrought ghettoes and eschew public life altogether". In her July 28, 2010 National Post article, Kay wrote about Jewish messianism, the theme of a 2007 Michael Chabon novel, The Yiddish Policemen's Union, against the backdrop of the rise of the Haredi Judaism in 2010, an "extreme right wing ultra-Orthodox" that numbered approximately 1.3 million in 2010. Kay expressed concerns that could eventually dominate the Knesset—and "Jewish destiny".

In 2013, Kay published an article sympathising with Serena Williams's Rolling Stone statement regarding the Steubenville rape case. In a response to a comment, she said, "Ours is not a rape culture. If it were, our girls would be walking around in burqas". Further debate over what constitutes rape culture came in February 2014 when Kay criticized universities for exaggerating the prevalence of rape. Her claim that prudent women face a "statistically nugatory" chance of being assaulted was referred to as "irresponsible nonsense" by Toula Drimonis and Ethan Cox.

In 2018, Kay received criticism for comments she made in a National Post column about the perpetrator of the Toronto van attack, saying "I would have preferred it [sic] this had been an act of jihadism or something else linked to a clear ideology or cause" and that "Islamist terror is at least something we have come to understand".

Kay was criticized for citing a Kevin Alfred Strom quotation which is often misattributed to Voltaire—"To learn who rules over you, simply find out who you are not allowed to criticize." In a Canadaland article, Jonathan Goldsbie wrote that Kay had tweeted the phrase in April 2017. In her blog post, "Bill C-16, or The Transgender Identity Bill, is an act of "Velvet Totalitarianism", Kay compared the October 2017 Transgender Rights Bill to compelled speech in Voltaire's 18th century when it "was dangerous to criticize the Catholic Church and its dogmas. In our era, it is dangerous to criticize the Church of Gender Identity and its dogmas." During the July 18, 2018, panel discussion on the Bill C-16 Controversy, hosted by the Rights and Freedoms Institute, Kay used the phrase again to describe her "quarrel" with "compelled speech" and "compelled expression of belief" in regards to the use of genderless pronouns. Kay said it was ironic that she used Strom's words, but felt they the words of the quotation made sense, even if they are those of a Holocaust denier.

== Personal life ==
Kay is married to Ronny Kay. They have two children including journalist Jonathan Kay.

== Publications ==
- 2012: Unworthy Creature: A Punjabi Daughter's Memoir of Honour, Shame and Love, Freedom Press Canada, ISBN 978-0-98127-676-2 .
- 2012: Acknowledgements: A Cultural Memoir and Other Essays, Freedom Press Canada, ISBN 978-0-98816-917-3 .
