= Anne Golden =

Canadian administrator (born 1941)

Anne Golden CM OOnt (born 1941) is a Canadian public policy analyst and organizational executive.

She received her BA in history from University of Toronto, in 1962. She received her MA in American history from Columbia University and her PhD in American history from the University of Toronto.

She joined the United Way of Greater Toronto, Canada's largest annual fundraising campaign and non-governmental distributor of funds to the social services, in 1982, serving as President from 1987 to 2001. From 2001 until 2012, she was the president and CEO of The Conference Board of Canada. In April 2012 she was named Distinguished Visiting Scholar and Special Advisor at Ryerson University.

She gained national recognition for her work as Chair of the Greater Toronto Area Task Force for Ontario (1996), Chair of the Toronto Homelessness Action Task Force (1999), and Premier Kathleen Wynne's Transit Investment Strategy Advisory Panel (2013). She taught at Newark College of Engineering, Scarborough and Erindale colleges at the University of Toronto, and York University.

In 2003, she was made a Member of the Order of Canada. In 2013, she was made a Member of the Order of Ontario. She has received eight honorary doctorates: Ryerson Polytechnic University (1997); York University (2000); University of Toronto (2002); Royal Roads University (2005); Loyalist College (2005); University of Western Ontario (2008); McMaster University (2011), the University of Calgary (2011).

Noteworthy awards include: The Negev Dinner Honoree, Jewish National Fund (1991); The Canadian Urban Institute's Jane Jacobs Lifetime Achievement Award, and The Conference Board of Canada's 2012 Honorary Associate award. In 1993, Dr. Golden was named "one of the eight best people in Metropolitan Toronto" by Toronto Life.

One of Golden's sisters is National Post columnist Barbara Kay.
