= Esther Delisle =

Canadian historian (born 1954)

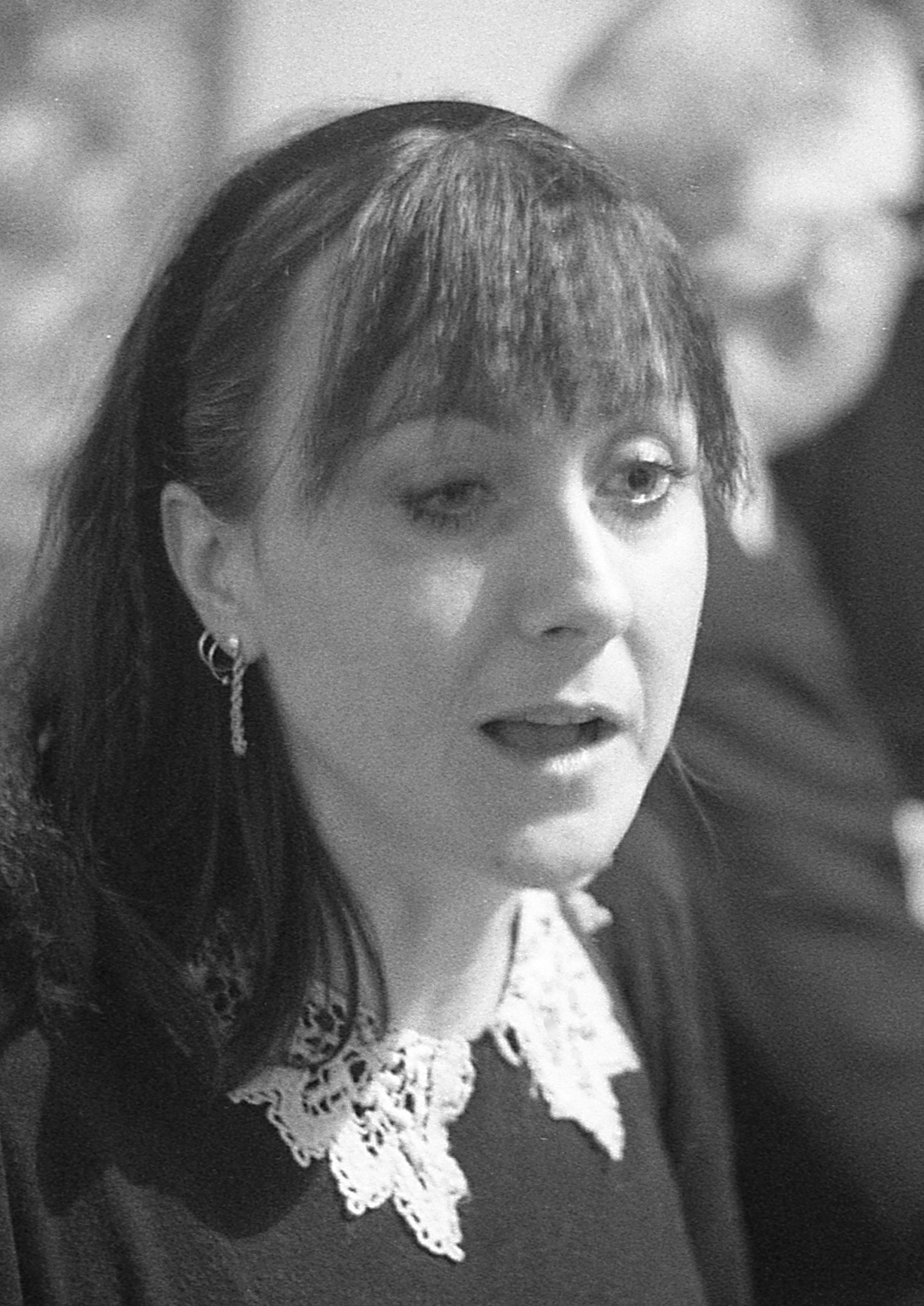
- Delisle in Montreal, 1992
- Born: 1954 (age 71–72); Quebec City, Canada
- Occupations: Historian; author
- Known for: The Traitor and the Jew: Anti-Semitism and the Delirium of Extremist Right-Wing Nationalism in French Canada from 1929–1939

Academic background
- Education: Université Laval (PhD)

Esther Delisle (born 1954) is a Canadian historian and author.

== Biography ==
Born and raised in Quebec City, she completed her BA and MA in political science at Université Laval and taught political theory at a CEGEP, and also worked as a researcher for The Fifth Estate on CBC Television. She then studied for three years at the Hebrew University of Jerusalem in Israel before returning to Laval to complete her doctorate, following which she did post-doctoral studies at the department of history at McGill University.

== Delisle–Richler controversy ==
Her doctoral thesis, in which she adduced evidence of a history of antisemitism and support for European fascism among Quebec nationalists of the 1930s, was controversial long before it was published. The book was strongly critical of the nationalist historian Lionel Groulx and the newspaper Le Devoir. The normal time for a thesis at Université Laval to be approved was three months; her committee delayed a decision for almost two years, until articles about the delay and the controversy surrounding her work had appeared in the French- and English-language press.

In 1993, she published a book based on her doctoral political science thesis, short-titled The Traitor and the Jew. The book aroused considerable hostility; when she appeared at one Quebec bookstore, the manager of the shopping mall cut the electricity to the bookstore in order to interfere with her book signing. (Different versions of this incident appear in Sara Scott, "The Lonely Passion of Esther Delisle", Elm Street, April 1998, p. 97, and Sheli Teitelbaum, "Quebec and French Nazis", The Canadian Jewish News, December 15, 1994, reprinted from The Jerusalem Report.) A 2002 documentary film by Eric R. Scott titled Je me souviens recounts Delisle's story using rare archival footage with speeches and commentaries by some of Quebec's leading nationalist figures of the time.

The controversy over whether or not Quebec society is or was antisemitic simplifies her thesis and has obscured the more important themes of her work. For Delisle, Quebecers were not uniformly antisemitic; antisemitism was a disease of Quebec intellectuals rather than of the common people, part and parcel of their condemnation of the vices of liberalism, modernity, urbanism, not to mention movies and jazz music and other aspects of American culture, all of which they saw as dangers to their conception of the ideal Quebec society. She attacks as myth the beliefs put forward by historians such as Lionel Groulx that the Québécois are a racially and ethnically homogeneous group of pure descent from French Catholics who immigrated to New France. She argues that the Quebec intellectuals of the 1930s and 1940s were far less isolated and more deeply influenced by the intellectual currents in Europe, particularly the nationalism of the extreme right, than is described in most Quebec histories of the period.

In 1998, Delisle published, Myths, Memories and Lies, an account of how some members of Quebec's elite, nationalist and federalist, supported the French Nazi collaborator military officer Philippe Pétain and his Vichy government within German-occupied France during World War II and also helped bring other French collaborators to safety in Quebec after the conflict ended in Europe.

== Criticism ==
Historian Gérard Bouchard, who also published a book critical of Lionel Groulx, has been very critical of The Traitor and the Jew. In a letter to Le Devoir, published on May 1, 2003, he contended that only 14 of 58 quotes of Lionel Groulx in Delisle's thesis are accurate, and that the 44 other quotes contain 56 irregularities, including additions and amputations of the text, word replacements that change the meaning, and quotes that are not found in the text where Delisle claims they are. He asserts that the magnitude of inaccuracy discourages him from even considering Delisle's work as a basis for his own criticism of Groulx (Les Deux Chanoines – Contradiction et ambivalence dans la pensée de Lionel Groulx, 2003). Delisle admitted to 13 irregularities in the references of her book and later corrected citations for some of the disputed quotations.

Bouchard and Delisle agree that Groulx expressed antisemitic opinions. For Bouchard, these opinions do not taint Groulx's scholarship or secular Quebec nationalism because Groulx's antisemitism is seen as a personal bias unrelated or peripheral to his academic work. Delisle, by contrast, argues that antisemitism is an integral component of Groulx's race-based nationalism and his enthusiasm for right-wing authoritarian governments.

== Bibliography ==
- Delisle, Esther (1993). The Traitor and the Jew: Anti-Semitism and the Delirium of Extremist Right-Wing Nationalism in French Canada from 1929-1939 (Antisémitisme et nationalisme d'extrême-droite dans la province de Québec 1929-1939). ISBN 1-895854-01-6.
- Delisle, Esther (1998). Myths, Memories & Lies: Quebec's Intelligentsia and the Fascist Temptation, 1939-1960 (Essais sur l'imprégnation fasciste au Québec). ISBN 1-55207-008-5.
- Delisle, Esther; Malouf, Pierre K. (2004). Le Quatuor d'Asbestos.
- Teboul, Victor (1977). Mythe et images du Juif au Québec. éditions de Lagrave.
