= Paul Wells =

Canadian journalist and pundit

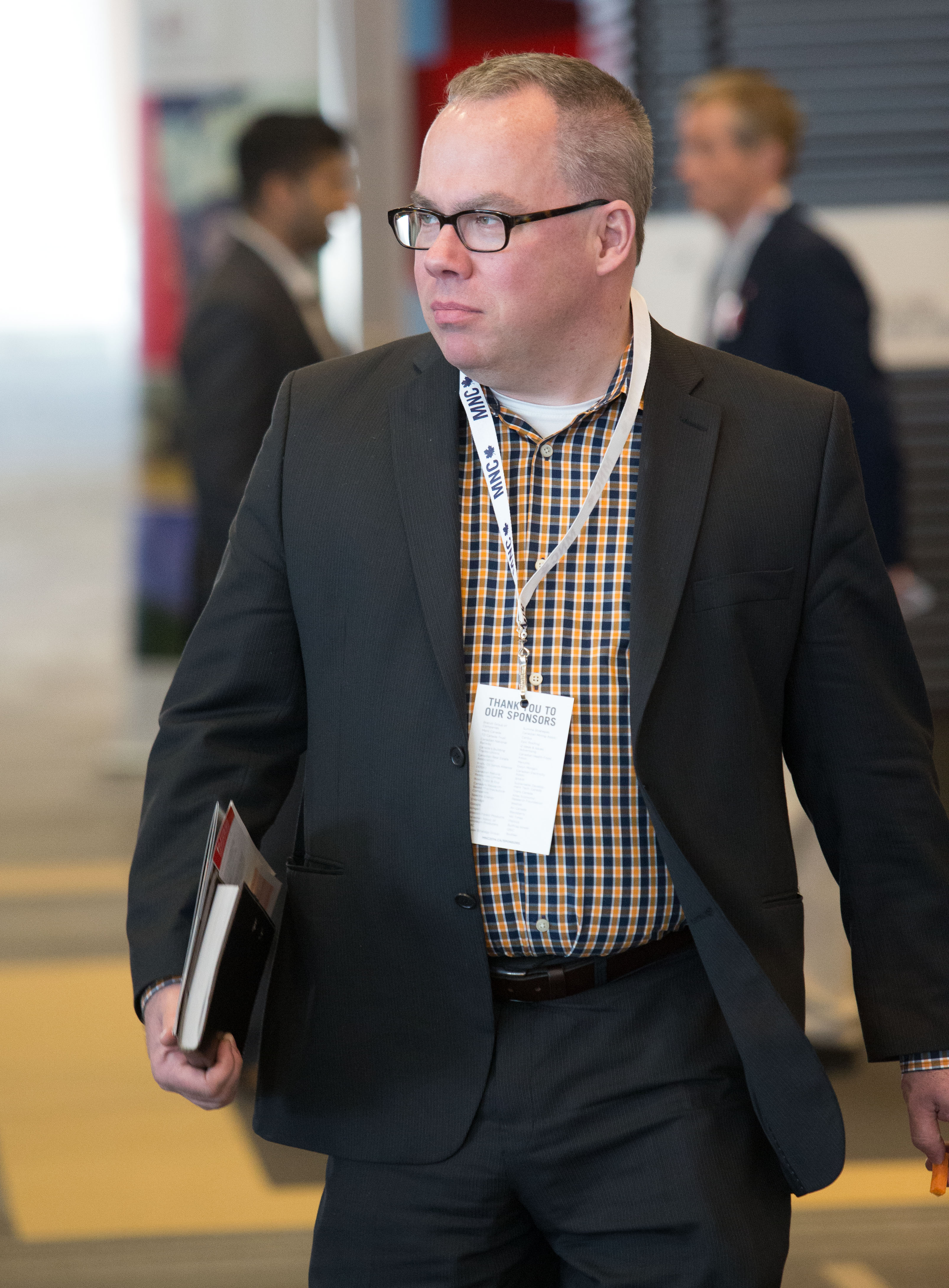
- Wells at the 2014 Manning Networking Conference
- Born: Sarnia, Ontario, Canada
- Education: University of Western Ontario
- Occupation: Political journalist
- Employer(s): Toronto Star; Maclean's; National Post; The Gazette

Paul Wells is a Canadian journalist and pundit. He was briefly a national affairs columnist for the Toronto Star in 2016–2017. Before that, he was a columnist for Maclean's for thirteen years; his column originally appeared in the back page slot famously occupied for many years by Allan Fotheringham but was subsequently moved to the front of the magazine with other columns.

== Biography ==
Wells was born in Sarnia, Ontario, the son of Seigrid Eleanor (Wedin) and Allen Rollins Wells. His mother's family was Swedish.

Wells's first book, Right Side Up: The Fall of Paul Martin and the Rise of Stephen Harper's New Conservatism, debuted in October 2006 and quickly appeared on multiple Canadian best seller lists. In early 2012, he released his e-book The Harper Decade, following Stephen Harper's rise to power.

He won the Shaughnessy Cohen Prize for Political Writing in 2014 for his book The Longer I’m Prime Minister: Stephen Harper and Canada, 2006.

Wells moderated the first nationally televised English leader election debate of the 2015 federal election campaign season. He also moderated one of the English leader debates during the 2019 Federal Election campaign.

In addition to his work in print journalism, he has also hosted the political talk show Maclean's Live for CPAC.

=== Notable articles ===
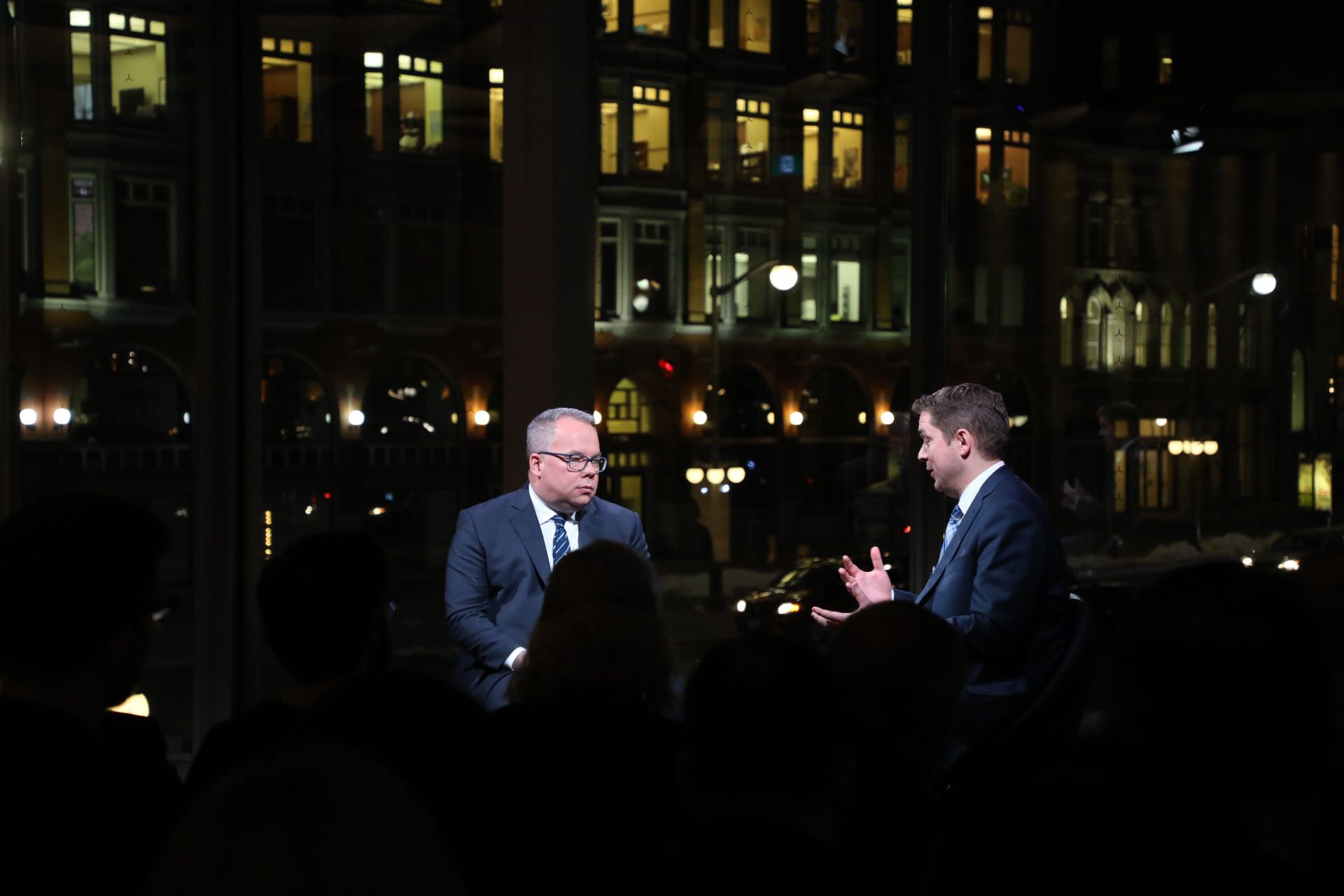
Wells with Conservative Party leader Andrew Scheer.

On 8 May 2008, Wells criticized Robert Dutrisac, Christian Rioux and Michel David for their bowdlerization of Canadian history in the service of Quebec separatists. His angle is that these Quebec journalists downplay any Canadian history before the Quiet Revolution of Jean Lesage, because it is inconvenient for the separatists.

=== Honours ===
While at Maclean's, Wells won three gold National Magazine Awards.

In 2015, he was awarded Poland's Gold Cross of Merit "for spreading a positive image of Poland in Canada".

He was named honorary patron of Friends of the National Arts Centre Orchestra in 2016.
