= Corinne De Vailly =

Canadian writer

Corinne De Vailly (born September 10, 1959) is a French-born Canadian writer living in Quebec.

She was born in Saint-Quentin, Aisne and came to Quebec with her family in 1973. She studied literature at the Cégep de Saint-Laurent and worked as a freelance journalist for various literary publications of Quebecor and Québec-Mag. In 1986, she became bureau chief and reporter for the program Le Petit Journal, an information show for young people, at Télévision Quatre-Saisons.

She wrote scripts for several television shows for young people, including Iris and Mais où se cache Carmen San Diego at Radio-Canada and La Bande magique at TVI. During the 1980s, she wrote musical comedies for children Les Mics et les Micquettes and Les Schnouguis which were presented at La Ronde.

De Vailly has written a number of novels for young people as well as informative books. Her series Celtina, Emrys, and Phoenix, détective du Temps were very popular.

== Selected works ==
- Miss Catastrophe, youth novel (1993)
- Top Model, youth novel (1997)
- Chimères, novel with Normand Lester (2002)
- Verglas, novel with Normand Lester (2006)
- Celtina, youth novel series (2006-2010)
- Phoenix, détective du Temps, series (2006-2010)
- Mon premier livre de contes du Québec (2009), finalist for the Prix jeunesse des bibliothèques de Montréal
- Emrys, youth novel series (2010-2014)
- Mélusine et Philémon, series (2012-2013)
- Les Orchidées de Staline, novel with Normand Lester (2017)
