= The Traitor and the Jew =

1992 book by Esther Delisle

The Traitor and the Jew (full title: The Traitor and the Jew: Anti-Semitism and the Delirium of Extremist Right-Wing Nationalism in French Canada from 1929–1939), a history by Esther Delisle, was published in French in 1992. She documented the history of antisemitism and support of fascism among Quebec nationalists and intellectuals during the 1930s and '40s.

The book was first published in French by L'Étincelle as Le traître et le Juif: Lionel Groulx, le Devoir et le délire du nationalisme d'extrême droite dans la province de Québec, 1929–1939. In 1993, it was published in English by Robert Davies Publishing of Montreal. Delisle is a political scientist based in Quebec.

Delisle alleged that Lionel Groulx, a Canadian intellectual and a father of Quebec nationalism, had published antisemitic articles under pseudonyms. Her criticism of Groulx generated considerable debate. In addition to contesting her conclusions about Groulx, some critics said that her methodology was inaccurate and that her conclusions could not be supported. Other historians supported her work as part of a revision of thought on Quebec nationalism and Canadian thought before World War II. She was quoted favourably by the author Mordecai Richler in his collection of essays, Oh Canada! Oh Quebec! (1992), which generated its own controversy.

Je me souviens is a documentary based on her book made by Eric R. Scott. It was shown on Canal D in 2002 and premiered in the United States in 2003 at the New York Jewish Film Festival.

== Summary ==
Delisle assessed the content of articles published in the nationalist review L'Action nationale and the Montreal newspaper Le Devoir to evaluate the attitudes among French Canadians and to show the connection between nationalistic and fascist thought. She also linked Canadian attitudes to those of the Roman Catholic Church in Quebec and to Catholics in Europe and the United States.

Specifically, she alleged Lionel Groulx (1878–1967), a Roman Catholic priest and leading Quebec intellectual, had been antisemitic and noted hundreds of antisemitic quotations that were by or attributed to him. She alleged that Groulx had published antisemitic articles under pseudonyms and had been an active fascist sympathizer. This assertion generated great controversy, alongside her reporting numerous antisemitic opinion pieces and articles that had been published in the respected intellectual Quebec newspaper Le Devoir in the 1930s.

Delisle did not argue that residents of Quebec were uniformly antisemitic. She felt that it was more characteristic of Quebec intellectuals of the time rather than that of the common people and that it was part of their condemnation of liberalism, modernity and urbanism, not to mention movies, jazz music and other aspects of American culture, all of which they saw as dangers to their conception of the ideal Quebec society. She notes that the mass-circulation newspaper La Presse, as one example, did not publish as much antisemitic content as the intellectually-influential but less read Le Devoir.

She argued against what she calls the myth, as recounted by historians such as Groulx, that the Québécois are a racially and ethnically homogeneous group of pure descent (pure laine in French, meaning "pure wool") from French-speaking Catholic immigrants to New France. She said that the Quebec intellectuals in the 1930s and 1940s were less isolated from and more deeply influenced by intellectual currents in Europe, particularly the nationalism of the extreme right than is described in most Quebec histories of the period.

== Reception ==
Delisle's book was based on her doctoral dissertation. Her conclusions generated such strong disagreement among her thesis committee at the Université Laval that they did not approve it for two years.

Delisle's analysis of Groulx and Le Devoir was covered sympathetically in a 1991 article about the young scholar in L'Actualité, the Quebec news magazine.

On March 1, 1997, L'Actualité revisited the controversy about Delisle's doctoral thesis and book in a cover story, Le mythe du Québec fasciste ("The Myth of a Fascist Quebec"). In the same issue, it featured a profile of Groulx. Both articles acknowledged Groulx's antisemitism and the generally favourable attitude of the Roman Catholic Church to fascism in the 1930s. Pierre Lemieux, an economist and author, responded to the magazine by writing: "The magazine's attack is much weakened by Claude Ryan, editor of Le Devoir in the 1970s, declaring that he has changed his mind and come close to Delisle's interpretation after reading her book."

L'Actualité claimed but did not document that Delisle's work had been subsidized by Jewish organizations. Claude Charron, a former Parti Québécois cabinet minister, repeated that assertion when he was introducing a 2002 broadcast on Canal D of Je me souviens, the Eric R. Scott documentary about Delisle's book. Scott and Delisle said that was an absolute falsehood and asked Canal D to rebroadcast the documentary, as they considered Charron's introduction to be defamatory and inaccurate.

Groulx is revered by nationalist French-Quebeckers as a father of Quebec nationalism although his work is little read today. As a sign of his stature, a station on the Montreal Metro as well as schools, streets, lakes, and a chain of mountains in Quebec are all named after him. However, there is a movement to have these name changed.

To separate his political and literary activities from his academic work, Groulx wrote journalism and novels under numerous pseudonyms. In her history, Delisle claimed that Groulx, under the pseudonym Jacques Brassier, wrote in a 1933 article published in L'Action nationale: "Within six months or a year, the Jewish problem could be resolved, not only in Montreal but from one end of the province of Quebec to the other. There would be no more Jews here other than those who could survive by living off one another."

Referring to Groulx and the Le Devoir newspaper, Francine Dubé wrote in the National Post on April 24, 2002 that "the evidence Delisle has unearthed seems to leave no doubt that both were anti-Semitic and racist." The Montreal Gazette referred that year to "anti-Semitism and pro-fascist sympathies that were common among this province's (Quebec) French-speaking elite in the 1930s."

A variety of commentators have agreed with Delisle's conclusions:

- In a 1994 issue of The Canadian Historical Review, Irving Abella wrote:

"Clearly Delisle's message is discomfiting to many French-Canadian nationalists and it should be. She portrays a nationalism which was racist, paranoid, xenophobic, and anti-Semitic. Yet its spokesmen and ideologues were not cranks, but rather the leaders of French-Canadian society, its clerics, academics, and journalists – people who were universally admired and listened to."

- Claude Bélanger, Department of History at Marianopolis College, said: "Anti-semitism was alive and well among the ultramontane nationalists of the period of 1890 to 1945" and "These anti-semitic views were propounded broadly and openly from about 1890 to 1945." Bélanger noted that Pierre Anctil documented antisemitism in Quebec in his 1988 book Le Devoir, les Juifs et l'immigration.
- Gary Evans, an historian, author, and professor at the University of Ottawa said:
  "Academic Esther Delisle angrily attacks the Establishment for its position of "Everyone knows, but no one should say" with regard to her own attempts to reveal Quebec's shameful intellectual past, including a postwar policy of welcoming Nazi collaborators from France and of trivializing the Holocaust."

== Delisle–Richler controversy ==
The Delisle–Richler controversy is the title of a separate Wikipedia article that explores in more detail the issues related to Esther Delisle's and Mordecai Richler's discussions about antisemitism among Quebec intellectuals of the pre-World War II years, including Groulx. Sarah Scott has noted that, after Delisle's work was quoted with approval in Mordecai Richler's book Oh Canada! Oh Quebec!, which generated its own controversy, Delisle was subject to considerable criticism. Delisle has said that the reaction among the French Canadian public to Richler's praise was as if she had been "embraced by the Devil."

== Criticism ==
In 1994, Gary Caldwell criticized Delisle's in an article in The Literary Review of Canada. Caldwell is a sociologist and demographer who is a member of the governing national council of the Parti Québécois. He argued that Delisle did not prove her assertion that articles published under the pseudonym of Lambert Closse were written by Groulx. He also took issue with her citation and excerpting practices.

In summary, Caldwell characterized Laval University as "disloyal" to the French-Canadian community for having granted Delisle a doctorate.

In response, Delisle noted that the Lambert Closse articles are not central to her thesis; they were not mentioned in her doctoral thesis on which her book is based. She acknowledges that she cannot prove that the Closse article was written by Groulx, but says that Groulx is known to have been involved in publishing the book in which it appeared. She also corrected some of the citations noted as inaccurate.

The historian Gérard Bouchard also criticized Delisle for her methodology in his book on Groulx, Les Deux Chanoines – Contradiction et ambivalence dans la pensée de Lionel Groulx published in 2003. Bouchard wrote that he chose not to use Delisle's history as a source because, according to his own process of verification, it contains too many errors in the citations of references. He said that of Delisle's 57 references to texts by Groulx published in L'Action nationale between 1933 and 1939, he was unable to find 23 and that 5 others were not accurately cited.

Esther Delisle contested his conclusions in a letter published in Le Devoir on April 11, 2003. She had her lawyer submit a formal notice to have Bouchard withdraw the assertions he made on page 19 of his book. The letter from her lawyer to Bouchard provided her clarifications on the sources she used in her work and recognized 13 irregularities in her references.

Bouchard wrote a letter to Le Devoir, published on May 1, 2003, relating the results of his second review of Delisle's methodology. He further criticized Deilise's citation practices.

However, Bouchard and Caldwell both acknowledge that Groulx expressed antisemitic opinions. They argue that such opinions do not discredit his scholarship or secular Quebec nationalism, either because the antisemitism arises from Groulx' Catholic beliefs or because it is a personal bias unrelated or peripheral to his academic work. Delisle, by contrast, argues that antisemitism is an integral component of Groulx' race-based nationalism and his enthusiasm for right-wing authoritarian governments.

== Representation in other media ==
- 2002, Eric R. Scott directed and produced the documentary, Je me souviens, about Delisle's book. It was shown on Canal D television. The title is the motto of the province of Quebec.

== See also ==
- None Is Too Many: Canada and the Jews of Europe 1933-1948 (1983)
