= Je me souviens (2002 film) =

- Directed by: Eric R. Scott
- Written by: Eric R. Scott; Esther Delisle (book)
- Produced by: Eric R. Scott
- Distributed by: Les productions des quatre jeudis inc.
- Release date: 28 April 2002
- Running time: 47 minutes
- Country: Canada
- Language: French

Je me souviens is a 2002 documentary film about antisemitism and pro-Nazi sympathies in Quebec during the 1930s through post World War II made by Montreal filmmaker Eric Richard Scott. The title of the film is French for I remember, and is the official motto of Quebec. The film was inspired by The Traitor and the Jew (1992-1993), a history of Quebec from 1929-1939, showing the links among antisemitism, nationalism, and fascism among Quebec Catholic intellectuals.

== Background ==
Eric Scott's documentary film was inspired by the 1993 book The Traitor and the Jew: Anti-Semitism and the Delirium of Extremist Right-Wing Nationalism in French Canada from 1929-1939, by Dr. Esther Delisle, a history that revealed the prevalence of antisemitic and extreme right-wing ideology within mainstream French Canadian nationalist thought during the 1930s and 1940s. The book was published in French in 1992.

Scott's documentary notes that antisemitism existed in other parts of Canada, but it was particularly intense in Quebec. It was promoted by the Roman Catholic Church, in which almost every French Canadian had been reared since the colonial era, and which controlled the Quebec education system. Publications such as Jules-Paul Tardivel's La Vérité (journal), L'Action sociale, and La Semaine religieuse disseminated anti-Jewish views throughout the province. In the 1920s, the essays against Jews of the influential priest and intellectual Lionel Groulx influenced other clerics and teachers.

Such was the influence of Lionel Groulx that French-Canadian politicians such as Henri Bourassa urged Canada to stop Jewish immigration. Delisle examined the prevalence of anti-semitic articles in the mainstream media, such as the French language newspaper Le Devoir. Arriving mostly in the late nineteenth and early twentieth centuries, the Jewish population was a very small minority, representing 1% of the population. Many settled in Montreal. Native Yiddish speakers, they adopted English, which was then the official language. This was another element that put them at odds with the Francophone Québécois.

At the time, approved reading material for Quebec students included books by the French author Maurice Barrès, considered an antisemite, and the racist L'homme, cet inconnu (Man, This Unknown) by Alexis Carrel, which were widely read. In their 2006 book Young Trudeau: Son of Quebec, Father of Canada, 1919-1944, based on the private diaries and papers of the late Prime Minister of Canada Pierre Trudeau, the scholars Max and Monique Nemi described what was being taught in the 1930s and 1940s at the Collège Jean-de-Brébeuf and the Université de Montréal:

"Democracy was bad and that Fascism — as represented by Mussolini and Pétain — was good. The picture that emerges is of a Quebec elite that was raised to be pro-fascist, and where Nazi atrocities were dismissed as English (Canadian) propaganda."

Je me souviens recounts the support given to the Nazi regime in Germany by Montreal's Le Devoir newspaper and by some French-Canadian intellectuals, as well as their support for the Nazi puppet regime of Vichy France. The film also documents the collusion between members of the Roman Catholic clergy and Nazi collaborators.

The convicted French war criminals Jacques de Bernonville, Georges-Benoit Montel, and Jacques Duge were aided in immigrating to Quebec after World War II by such prominent Quebec nationalists as Robert Rumilly, Lionel Groulx, and the Montreal mayor Camillien Houde. (Additional confirmation by McGill University Professor Harold M. Waller and antisemitism expert in a 1996 article in the American Jewish Committee Archives).

Eric Scott began the project in 1995, receiving grants from Telefilm Canada and Société de développement des entreprises culturelles du Québec. He completed the film in 1998 but could not get the production aired for four more years. As a result of the effort of Bill Merrill, Vice-President of programming and production with CFCF-TV in Montreal, Je me souviens was broadcast on April 28, 2002 in Quebec on Canal D.

The film's United States premiere was in January 2003 in New York City at the annual New York Jewish Film Festival. The Jewish Museum and the Film Society of Lincoln Center helped get the viewing.

Appearances:

- Irving Abella - historian
- Guy Bouthillier - president of Quebec's Saint-Jean-Baptiste Society
- Pierre Dansereau - ecologist and educator
- Esther Delisle - historian
- Jacques Hébert - former member of the Senate of Canada
- Irving Layton - Quebec poet
- Robert Paxton - historian and Columbia University professor
- Jean-Louis Roux - playwright

== See also ==
- List of Quebec films
- Cinema of Quebec
- Culture of Quebec
- History of the Jews in Canada
- Conscription Crisis of 1944
- Young Trudeau: Son of Quebec, Father of Canada, 1919-1944
