= Le Livre noir du Canada anglais =

21st-century book series by Normand Lester

Book jacket of the first volume reprint

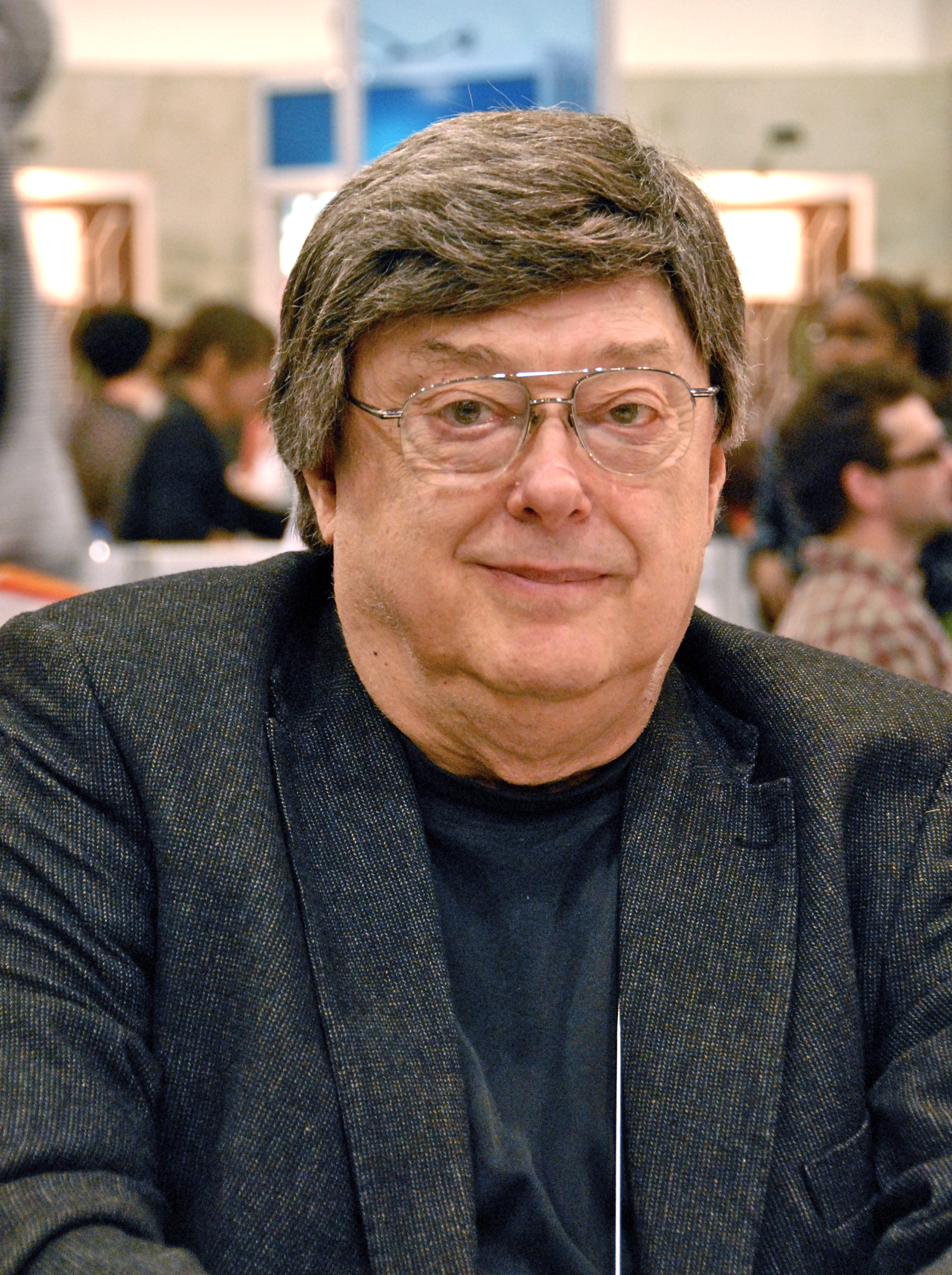
Normand Lester, author

Le Livre noir du Canada Anglais (The Black Book of English Canada) is a series of three polemical books written by the Quebec journalist Normand Lester. Les Intouchables published the first volume in 2001. The essays relate from the author's point of view, while including many historians' citations, the historical fabrications and injustices in Canada, notably those against French-speaking Quebecers, Jewish and Aboriginal peoples. Its publication resulted in Société Radio-Canada suspending Lester.

== Description ==
The books are Lester's response to perceived Quebec bashing in the English Canadian press following the airing of Heritage Minutes, which Lester perceived to be a "watered-down version" of Canadian history, the treatment of the 1995 Quebec referendum, and the federalist advertising campaign that would later develop into the sponsorship scandal. According to Lester, the English Canadian media were quick to pick up on stories that were distorted or untruthful, such as the supposed singing of a Nazi anthem at an early sovereigntist rally (actually a different song with a similar title).

The books' overall aim is to refute many of the claims of federalists, to show that the Quebec sovereignty movement was not inherently fascist and anti-Semitic, and to assert that these prejudices were in plentiful supply in English Canada. Volume one accused former Canadian prime minister R. B. Bennett of funding the fascist Adrien Arcand. The books survey Canadian history and identify what Lester sees as injustices, discriminatory practices and racist and hate speech, and the encouragement of violence and infamous actions by politicians, journalists and Anglo-Canadian intellectuals against French Canadians, Indians, the Japanese and Jews.

The Black Book of English Canada 2 attempts to demonstrate that "the people who throw stones at us live in a glass house". Lester wishes to illustrate the extent to which Protestant English Canadians, throughout Canadian history, have been "intolerant of all the racial, ethnic and cultural minorities that existed in Canada". The Black Book of English Canada 3 covers the perceived treatment of Quebecers in the twentieth century and the Acadians and French Canadians outside Quebec. Lester discusses discrimination in sport and the reaction of English Canada to the referendums in 1980 and 1995.

== Volumes ==
- Le Livre noir du Canada Anglais (2001; Les Intouchables ISBN 2-89549-045-7)
- Le Livre noir du Canada Anglais 2 (2002; ISBN 2-89549-065-1)
- Le Livre noir du Canada Anglais 3 (2003; ISBN 2-89549-117-8)

== Reviews ==
The Saint-Jean-Baptiste Society awarded Lester the Olivar-Asselin Award for his courage and professionalism.

As far as the Canadian Broadcasting Corporation was concerned, Lester's work was incompatible with the interests of the organization and they suspended him. Lise Ravary accused Lester of lacking professional judgment in a critical review of the book. William Johnson wrote of the book in The Globe and Mail, "It's the perfect piece of racist literature, a model on the methodology of inciting hatred." In Folie et société au Québec Historian Philippe Quesnel ended his review saying: "Impatient, arrogant and triumphant, Lester failed on a once-in-a-lifetime opportunity to properly present the veracity of a dark story. He had invaluable professional experience, a solid body of documentary and rare courage, but like a storm, he shattered everything in his path without the slightest subtlety ..."

CBC suspended Normand Lester.

== Political reactions ==
Quebec Premier Bernard Landry praised the book as a "must-read". Graham Fraser, then Commissioner of Official Languages wrote: "Those who see Canada as a series of defeats can reconstruct history according to this vision and that is the attitude of Normand Lester in his trilogy."

== English edition ==
McClelland & Stewart published an English-language edition, The Black Book of English Canada, translated by Ray Conlogue in October 2002.

== See also ==
- Pierre Vallières
- Speak White, poem and film
- Politics of Quebec
- Politics of Canada
- History of Quebec
- History of Canada
