= Among the Truthers =

Book by Jonathan Kay

Among the Truthers: A Journey Through America's Growing Conspiracist Underground
- Author: Jonathan Kay
- Publisher: Harper
- Publication date: 2011
- Pages: 368
- ISBN: 978-0-06-200481-9
- OCLC: 670475861

Among the Truthers: A Journey Through America's Growing Conspiracist Underground is a 2011 book by Canadian journalist Jonathan Kay that examines the popularity of conspiracy theories in the United States. The book examines the history and psychology of conspiracy theories, particularly focusing on the 9/11 Truth movement. It received generally positive reviews, though some reviewers raised issues about the book's focus and political claims.

== Summary ==
Though he concedes that history provides evidence of actual conspiracies, Kay argues that farfetched and paranoid conspiracies are gaining adherents at an increasing rate in the United States. In the book, he charts a history of 20th century conspiracy theories including groups such as the John Birch Society. Though much of the book focuses on the 9/11 Truth movement Kay also discusses conspiracy theories about the Bilderberg Group, vaccination, and Reptilians.

Kay attempts to define the factors that cause people to believe in conspiracies. He attributes some of the popularity of conspiracy theories to the influence of postmodern academic theories, such as deconstruction. He also blames what he sees as the liberal belief that "society is divided into victims and oppressors". In addition to political explanations, Kay also writes about psychological factors. He argues that many people prefer explanations for disasters which feature expansive conspiracies because it is more difficult to cope with the underlying incompetence or vulnerability at the root of such events.

While writing the book, Kay interviewed several figures in the 9/11 Truth movement, such as Alex Jones and Michael Ruppert. Kay classifies promoters of conspiracy theories into different groups, including those he refers to as "cranks" and "firebrands". He defines a "crank" as a person who seeks to expose conspiracies as an engrossing mission to fill one's life. He claims this type of person is usually drawn to conspiracy theories after a mid-life crisis. He defines a "firebrand" as a person who uses conspiracy theories to promote radical political views and thus gain public attention. He claims this type of person is usually university-age when they begin promoting conspiracies.

== Reception ==
Though he applauded Kay's history of conspiracy theories and commentary about the role of the internet, Jesse Singal of The Boston Globe faulted Kay for a "tendency toward ideological axe-grinding". Sonny Bunch of The Wall Street Journal similarly argued that Kay unfairly exaggerated the extent to which political correctness promotes conspiratorial thinking. However, Bunch praised Kay's explanation of the effects of deconstruction, noting the popularity of the 9/11 Truth movement among liberal-arts professors. Bunch and a reviewer for The Economist both faulted Kay for giving inadequate attention or explanation to the Birther movement.

The reviewer for The Economist praised Kay for his analysis of the psychological foundations of conspiratorial thinking and his discussion of the history of such thinking. The reviewer accurately predicted that advocates of the 9/11 Truth movement would dismiss Kay's analysis as a biased right-wing treatment of the issue.

Writing in The New York Times, Jacob Heilbrunn described the book as "remarkable", and praised the quality of Kay's reporting. But he also criticized the book for being poorly organized at points. Heilbrunn also argued that Kay exaggerates the influence of the 9/11 Truth movement on the culture of the United States.

== See also ==
- The Paranoid Style in American Politics
