= Canadian Institute for Jewish Research =

Canadian think tank

- Established: 1988
- Director: Frederick Krantz
- Website: isranet.org

The Canadian Institute for Jewish Research (CIJR) is a think tank based in Montreal and Toronto. Founded in 1988, its primary goal is "to strengthen public and student understanding of Jewish Israel as a unique democratic society in its difficult Middle Eastern context; to throw light on antisemitism and key Jewish-world issues generally; and to play a pivotal role in ensuring Jewish continuity by working with students, on and off campus."

== The Institute's seminars, colloquia, and activities ==
The Institute's Insider Briefing seminars and Community Colloquia feature experts on Israel, the Middle East, Jewish history, and modern Jewish world issues. Speakers have included Yossi Klein Halevi, Stockwell Day, Itamar Marcus, Dan Gillerman, Norman Podhoretz, Irwin Cotler, Steven Emerson, Moshe Ya'alon, James Woolsey, Alan Baker, and Isi Leiber.

== Student programs ==
In 2007, CIJR launched the Student Israel-Advocacy Seminars Program, a year-long training initiative. The Institute's Israel Learning Seminar (ILS) is a year-long training initiative focused on students but is also open to the public. Given by CIJR Academic Fellows, it is designed to counter anti-Semitism and anti-Zionism on campus and in the media.

== Baruch Cohen ==
Baruch Cohen (1919 - September 2018). During World War II, Baruch, who was born in Bucharest, survived pogroms, antisemitism, and forced labor camps in Romania. Many of his family and friends were killed in the Holocaust. After the war, Baruch and his family went to Israel. They subsequently moved to Montreal, where Baruch worked as a financial officer. When he retired, he enrolled in graduate school to pursue a Master's degree in Jewish Studies at Concordia University. He served as a full-time volunteer Research Chair at CIJR, which he helped to create. He conducted research, written, and mentored student interns. Baruch was also an active volunteer with the Montreal Holocaust Memorial Centre, where he had served as a docent and speaker. Twenty years ago, he spearheaded and launched the first Montreal Holocaust, Commemoration in memory of Jews murdered in Romania and Transnistria, which has since become an annual event.

== Middle East and Jewish world databank ==
The DataBank, an archive of Israel, Middle East, and other materials related to the Jewish world, is accessible on CIJR's website, which includes entries on issues ranging from Israeli society and regional politics to international Jewish communities, human rights, and the Holocaust.

== Publications ==
=== ISRAFAX ===
ISRAFAX is the institute's quarterly research print publication. It provides CIJR members with data and a digest of international analysis and opinion on issues, mixing original content with articles from newspapers, magazines, scholarly journals, official documents, and websites from around the world. The Israeli and Arab media are also scanned for reports, opinions, and other documents. The magazine is distributed internationally.

=== Dateline: Middle East ===
Published by the Student Coalition for a Just Peace in the Middle East, Dateline: Middle East is a journal featuring topics regarding Israel, the Middle East, and the Jewish world. The journal is made possible by the support of the Canadian Institute for Jewish Research. Appearing several times per year on university and college campuses, it is distributed across Canada, Israel, and the United States. Dateline examines the Middle East and covers issues related to the politics, economics, and cultures of the region from a Zionist perspective.
