= Jonathan Kay =

Canadian journalist (born 1968)

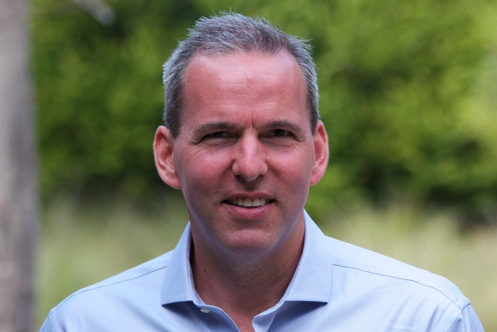
- Born: Jonathan Hillel Kay; 1968 (age 57–58); Montreal, Quebec, Canada
- Education: McGill University (BEng, MEng); Yale University (JD)
- Occupations: Journalist; lawyer
- Spouse: Jennifer Good
- Mother: Barbara Kay

Jonathan Hillel Kay (born 1968) is a Canadian journalist. He was the editor-in-chief of The Walrus (2014–2017), and is a senior editor of Quillette. He was previously comment pages editor, columnist, and blogger for the Toronto-based Canadian daily newspaper National Post, and continues to contribute to the newspaper on a freelance basis. He is also a book author and editor, a public speaker, and a regular contributor to Commentary and the New York Post.

== Early life and education ==
Jonathan Kay was born and raised in Montreal, Quebec, to an anglophone Jewish family. His mother is the socially conservative newspaper columnist Barbara Kay. His father worked in finance and was the breadwinner of the family. He attended Selwyn House School, and Marianopolis College before obtaining a BEng and an MEng in metallurgical engineering from McGill University and a Juris Doctor degree from Yale Law School. He is a member of the New York bar.

After practicing as a tax lawyer in New York City, Kay moved to Toronto, where, in 1998, he became a founding member of the National Post editorial board. Kay described himself as an avid tennis and board game enthusiast, and sometimes has incorporated his passion for both pursuits into his journalism.

== Career ==
Kay joined the National Post at its inception, in 1998, as a member of its editorial board, subsequently becoming the newspaper's Comment editor as well as a columnist. He left the newspaper's staff in 2014 but continues appearing in its pages as a freelance columnist.

Apart from his editorial work, Kay has also written two non-fiction books. In 2007, Kay co-authored The Volunteer, a biography of Mossad officer Michael Ross. In May 2011, HarperCollins published Kay's second book, Among the Truthers: A Journey Through America's Growing Conspiracist Underground. The book reflects Kay's interest in the psychology of conspiracy theorists.

Kay was a freelance editorial assistant on Liberal Party of Canada leader Justin Trudeau's memoir Common Ground published by HarperCollins with duties that included conducting some of the interviews with Trudeau that were used for the book. After the resignation of Trudeau's principal secretary Gerald Butts due to his role in the SNC-Lavalin affair, Kay revealed that Butts worked with him for the book. His participation in the project was criticized by conservatives in social media as well as by Sun News Network personality Ezra Levant, on whose 2009 book Shakedown Kay also worked as an editorial assistant.

His freelance articles have been published in a variety of US publications including Newsweek, The New Yorker, Salon.com, The New Republic, Harper's Magazine, the Los Angeles Times, The Weekly Standard, the Literary Review of Canada, The National Interest and The New York Times.

Since May 2018, Kay also hosted Quillette's Wrongspeak podcast, along with Debra W. Soh until she quit at the end of first series of episodes (2018). From February 2019, Jonathan continued to present the podcast throughout the year. Wrongspeak has been announced as "on hiatus" ever since December 30, 2019 as the last podcast featured Jonathan Kay's mother, Barbara Kay.

In 2021, Kay attracted media attention after he revealed that he had accidentally been using dog shampoo on himself for several months.

Canadian Anti-Hate Network (CAHN) board member and lawyer Richard Warman sued Kay and his mother Barbara in small claims court for posting what Warman claimed were defamatory tweets alleging links between CAHN and the antifa movement in the United States. The court dismissed the lawsuit in November 2022, stating that "CAHN did in fact assist Antifa and that the movement has been violent,” and ruling that it would be reasonable to state that it is not a "good look" for a human rights organization to support a violent movement.

=== The Walrus ===
Kay was named editor-in-chief of The Walrus, a Canadian general interest magazine, on October 29, 2014. Kay left the Post on November 21, 2014, but continued to contribute opinion pieces on a freelance basis.

He resigned as editor-in-chief of The Walrus on May 13, 2017, following a controversy around cultural appropriation in which Kay argued that concerns by Indigenous writers about the practice should be balanced against the right to free artistic representation. Kay said the reason he left was because of conflicts between his role as a manager at a respected media brand and as a columnist and media panelist in which he would state controversial opinions and that he had felt the need to self-censor his byline pieces and commentary outside of The Walrus. "In recent months especially, I have been censoring myself more and more, and my colleagues have sometimes been rightly upset by disruptions caused by my media appearances. Something had to give, and I decided to make the first move. I took no severance," he said in an email written to The Globe and Mail. Kay added that there had been no conflict between himself and the publisher of The Walrus and that he had been given a free hand to edit the magazine and its website and that the pressure he had felt to self-censor was in relation to his non-Walrus work.

== Published books ==
- The Volunteer: A Canadian's Secret Life in the Mossad, with Michael Ross, McClelland & Stewart, 2007 ISBN 978-0-771-01740-7
- Among the Truthers, HarperCollins, 2011 ISBN 978-0-062-00481-9
- Legacy: How French Canadians shaped North America, edited with André Pratte, 2016, repr. 2019 ISBN 978-0-771-07240-6
  - (in French) Batisseurs d'Amerique. Des Canadiens français qui ont fait l'histoire. La Presse, Montréal 2016 The Gazette, 2016
- Your Move: What Board Games Teach Us About Life, with Joan Moriarity, Sutherland House, 2019 ISBN 978-1-999-43954-5

== Awards and recognition ==
In 2002, he was awarded Canada's National Newspaper Award for Critical Writing. In 2004, he was awarded a National Newspaper Award for Editorial Writing. He is currently a visiting fellow at the Foundation for Defense of Democracies.
