= Toula Drimonis =

Canadian journalist and author

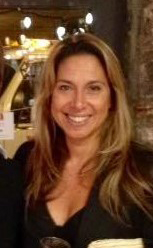
- Born: 1966 (age 59–60); Montreal, Quebec
- Education: Concordia University
- Occupations: Journalist and author
- Notable work: We, the Others: Allophones, Immigrants, and Belonging in Canada 2022. "Seeking Asylum: Building a Shareable World" 2024.

Toula Drimonis (born 1966), is a Canadian journalist, columnist, and author known for writing on immigration, Quebec politics, and women’s issues.

== Early life ==
Drimonis was born and raised in Montreal to Greek immigrant parents. She is trilingual, fluent in: English, French, and Greek. She writes primarily in English but works across English and French language media in Quebec.

== Career ==
In 2014, Drimonis, who identifies as a feminist, wrote in the Huffington Post about why she does not support the group FEMEN, arguing that their topless protests are ineffective, divisive, and dismissive of other women’s experiences.

In 2015, Drimonis was profiled in Le Devoir as part of a feature on anglophones and allophones in Quebec after the death of former premier Jacques Parizeau. She defended Parizeau against harsh criticism online and emphasized his role in building modern Quebec. The article described her as a bridge between francophone Quebec and English-speaking communities, noting her efforts to explain Quebec politics and identity to wider audiences. Drimonis, who spent part of her childhood in Greece, stated that she considers herself primarily Québécoise and has expressed support for progressive provincial parties such as Québec solidaire, while maintaining that she votes as a Quebecer rather than strictly as a federalist or sovereigntist.

In 2017, during the rise of the MeToo movement, Drimonis shared her own experiences of sexual harassment and assault in an interview with CBC News. She described the harassment she regularly receives as a columnist and recalled incidents dating back to her childhood, saying her story was “not extraordinary” because so many women have had similar experiences. She expressed hope that speaking out would help break the culture of silence around these issues.

Drimonis also speaks out on linguistic issues in Quebec. In 2017, she moderated an event at Concordia University entitled "Bill 101 at 40: panel discussion. Les 40 ans de la loi 101 : table ronde 1". Drimonis is in favour of Law 101 (Charter of the French Language). In 2018, Drimonis was invited to appear on television on "CityLife" on MAtv to share her opinion and perspective on Bill 101, 40 years after its passing.

Drimonis is the author of We, the Others: Allophones, Immigrants, and Belonging in Canada which was described in The Halifax Examiner as "part memoir, part history, part manifesto". The book is about the political discourse in Canada around immigration. She said the project was inspired in part by the death of her father, Panayote Drimonis, as a tribute to the sacrifices made by immigrants of his generation. The book also responds to political discourse in Quebec, particularly comments on immigration by Premier François Legault, which Drimonis argued contributed to stigmatization of immigrant communities.

Drimonis has been a weekly opinion columnist at The Montreal Gazette since 2023.

== Published works ==
- We, the Others: Allophones, Immigrants, and Belonging in Canada, 30 September 2022, Linda Leith Publishing, ISBN 978-1773901213.
- Nous, les autres (French translation of We, the Others), 29 January 2024, Somme toute, ISBN 978-2897944360.
- Seeking Asylum: Building a Shareable World, 16 March 2024, Linda Leith Publishing, ISBN 978-1773901527.

== See also ==
- 1995 Quebec referendum
- Demographics of Quebec
- Greek Canadians
- Language demographics of Quebec
