= Normand Lester =

Canadian journalist (born 1945)

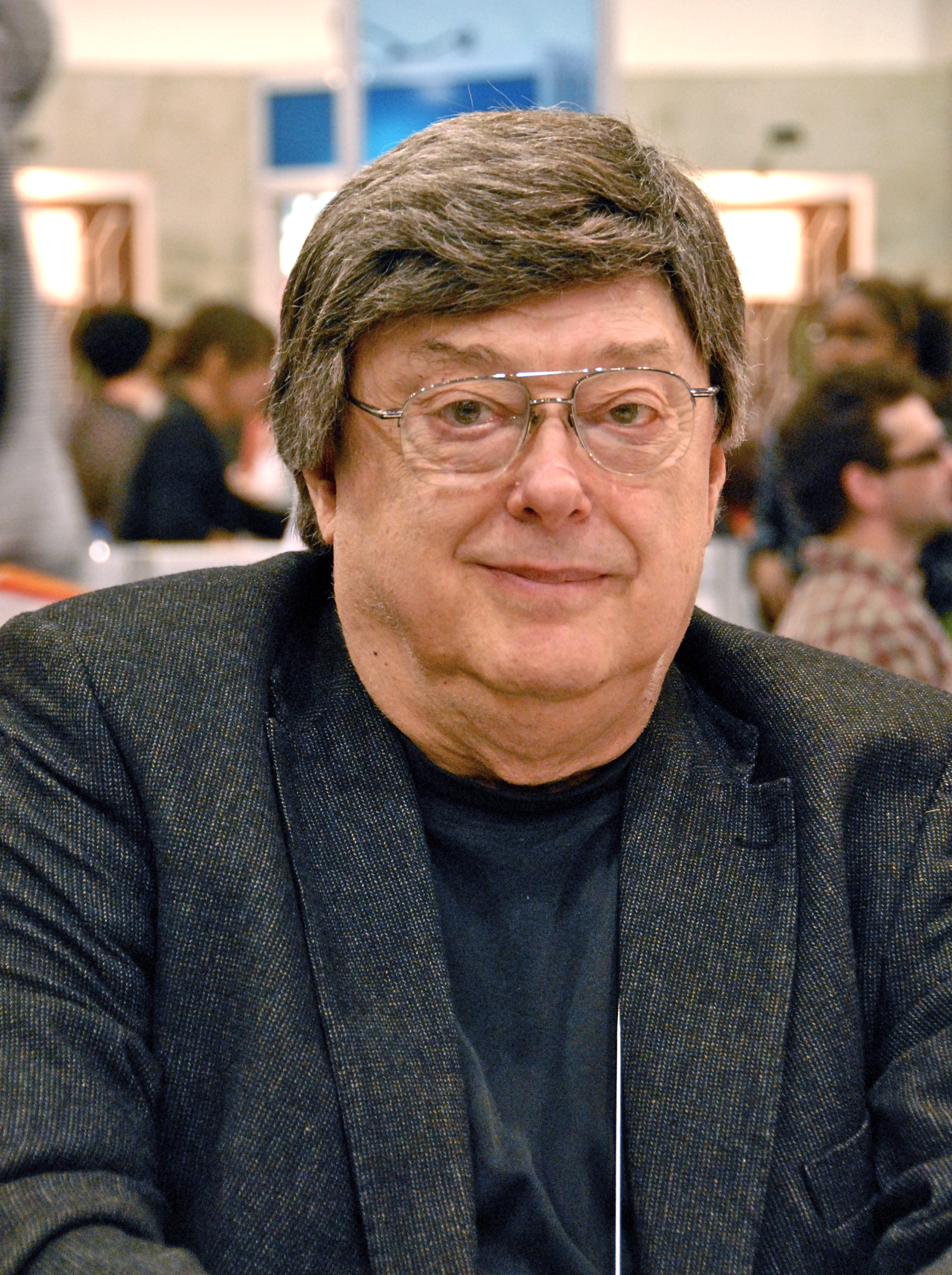
- Normand Lester
- Born: July 10, 1945 (age 81)
- Occupations: Investigative journalist, columnist, author
- Years active: 1964–present

Normand Lester (born July 10, 1945) is an investigative journalist from Quebec. Though he built his reputation through investigations of the Canadian Security Intelligence Service (CSIS), the Royal Canadian Mounted Police (RCMP) and the Canadian Forces, he is best known for the controversy created in Canada after the publication of his book Le Livre noir du Canada anglais ("The Black Book of English Canada") in 2005.

== Biography ==
Born to a Romanian immigrant and a French Canadian mother, Lester started his career in journalism in 1964. Two years later, he began a 35-year career as a reporter for the Radio-Canada, in which he found himself posted around the Western world, being posted in Washington, New York City and Paris.

In 1986, he was posted as parliamentary correspondent in Ottawa. He began to investigate and study the activities of the Canadian Security Intelligence Service, which had been created that year to take over duties formerly under the aegis of the RCMP. This would be the beginning of a long string of reports, some shocking, on the activities of CSIS, lasting twelve years. He investigated Claude Morin, cabinet minister and close advisor to René Lévesque and also a paid informant of the RCMP.

After the publication of the first part of the trilogy that is Livre noir du Canada anglais, Radio-Canada suspended him from his work on November 18, 2001, citing a lack of impartiality.

A few days later, Société Saint-Jean-Baptiste awarded him the Prix Olivar-Asselin for both his courage and excellence in investigative journalism. On December 5, 2001, after 35 years of service, Lester quit Radio-Canada. Since then, he has written for various newspapers, such as le Devoir.

In 2002, TVA hired him as a news commentator. In September 2005, he decided to quit for a similar job at TQS, with Jean-Luc Mongrain.

In 2006, he co-authored with Robin Philpot a book denouncing the actions of Option Canada, one of the organizations supporting the No side in the 1995 Quebec referendum. The actions of this group were alleged to have violated Quebec provincial laws and several key players in the organization would later be investigated for links to the sponsorship scandal.

On May 25, 2013, at the age of 67, Normand Lester suffered an acute myocardial infarction while driving his car on Côte-Sainte-Catherine boulevard in Montreal, causing him to lose consciousness and rear-end another car at a red light. He was taken to the nearby Jewish General Hospital and promptly transferred to the Montreal General Hospital for open-heart surgery. He returned home on June 17 and has been feeling well since.

== Bibliography ==
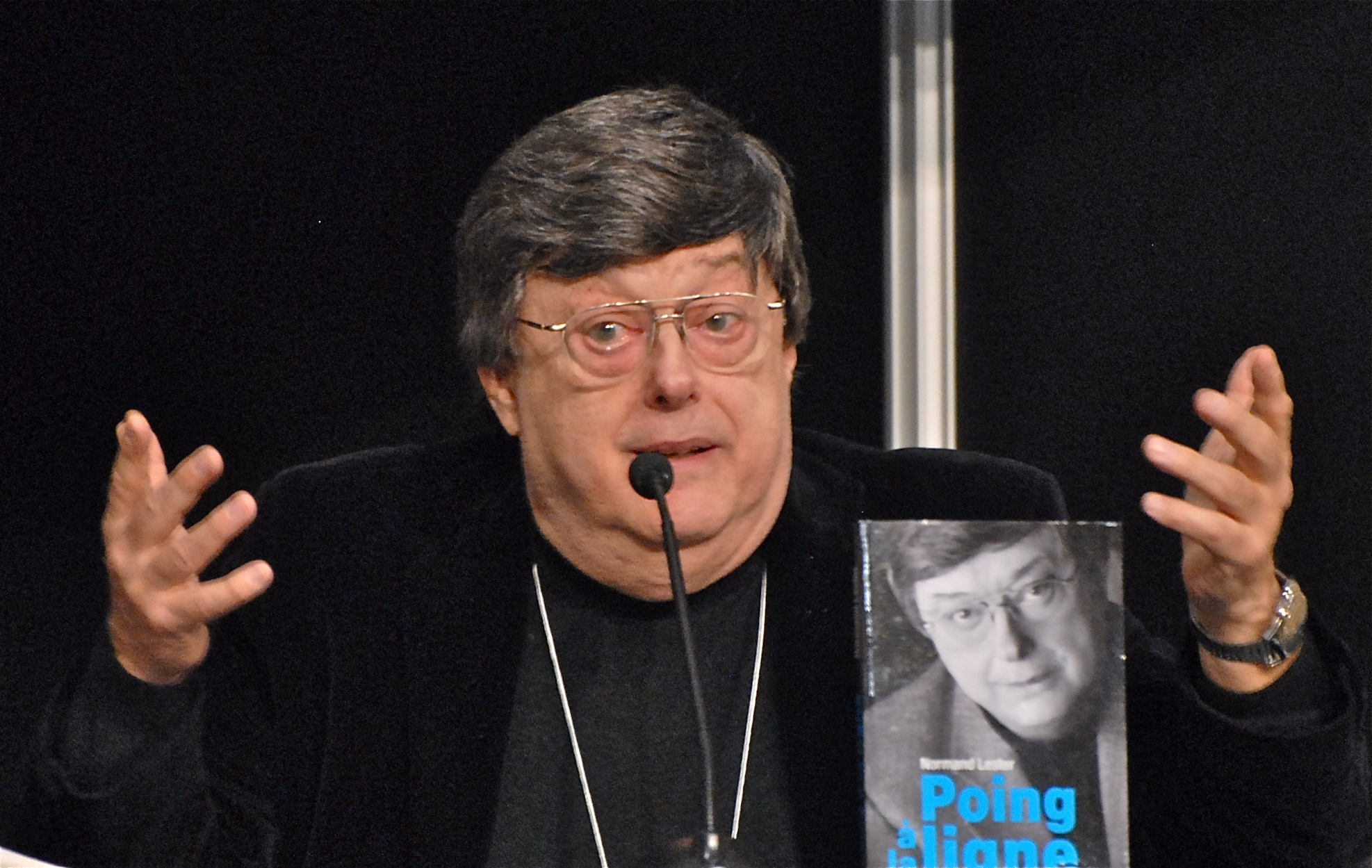
Normand Lester at the Quebec international book fair 2011

- 1991: L'Affaire Gerald Bull. Les Canons de l'apocalypse, Méridien, Montreal
- 1998: Enquêtes sur les services secrets, Éditions de l’Homme, Montreal, 384 pages, ISBN 978-2-7619-1425-3
- 2000: Alerte dans l’espace (with Michèle Bisaillon), Les Intouchables, Montreal, 124 pages, ISBN 2-89549-019-8
- 2001: Prisonnier à Bangkok (in collaboration with Alain Olivier), Éditions de l'Homme, Montreal, 256 pages, ISBN 978-2-7619-1591-5
- 2001: Le Livre noir du Canada anglais, tome 1, Les Intouchables, Montreal, 302 pages, ISBN 978-2-89549-045-6
- 2002: Chimères (with Corinne De Vailly)
- 2002: Le Livre noir du Canada anglais, tome 2, Les Intouchables, Montreal, 302 pages, ISBN 978-2-89549-065-4
- 2003: Le Livre noir du Canada anglais, tome 3, Les Intouchables, Montreal, 349 pages, ISBN 978-2-89549-117-0
- 2005: Mom (in collaboration with Guy Ouellette), Les Intouchables, Montreal, 169 pages, ISBN 2-89549-184-4
- 2006: Les Secrets d'Option Canada, Les Intouchables, Montreal, 168 pages, ISBN 978-2-89549-223-8
- 2006: Verglas (with Corinne De Vailly)
- 2011: Poing à la ligne, Chroniques 2010 et écrits polémiques, Les Intouchables, Montreal, 352 pages, ISBN 978-2-89549-443-0
- 2012: Contrepoing, Les Intouchables, Montreal, 344 pages, ISBN 978-2-89549-496-6
- 2013: À brûle-pourpoing, Les Intouchables, Montreal, 354 pages, ISBN 978-2-89549-603-8
