= Michel Venne =

Canadian journalist and author (born 1960)

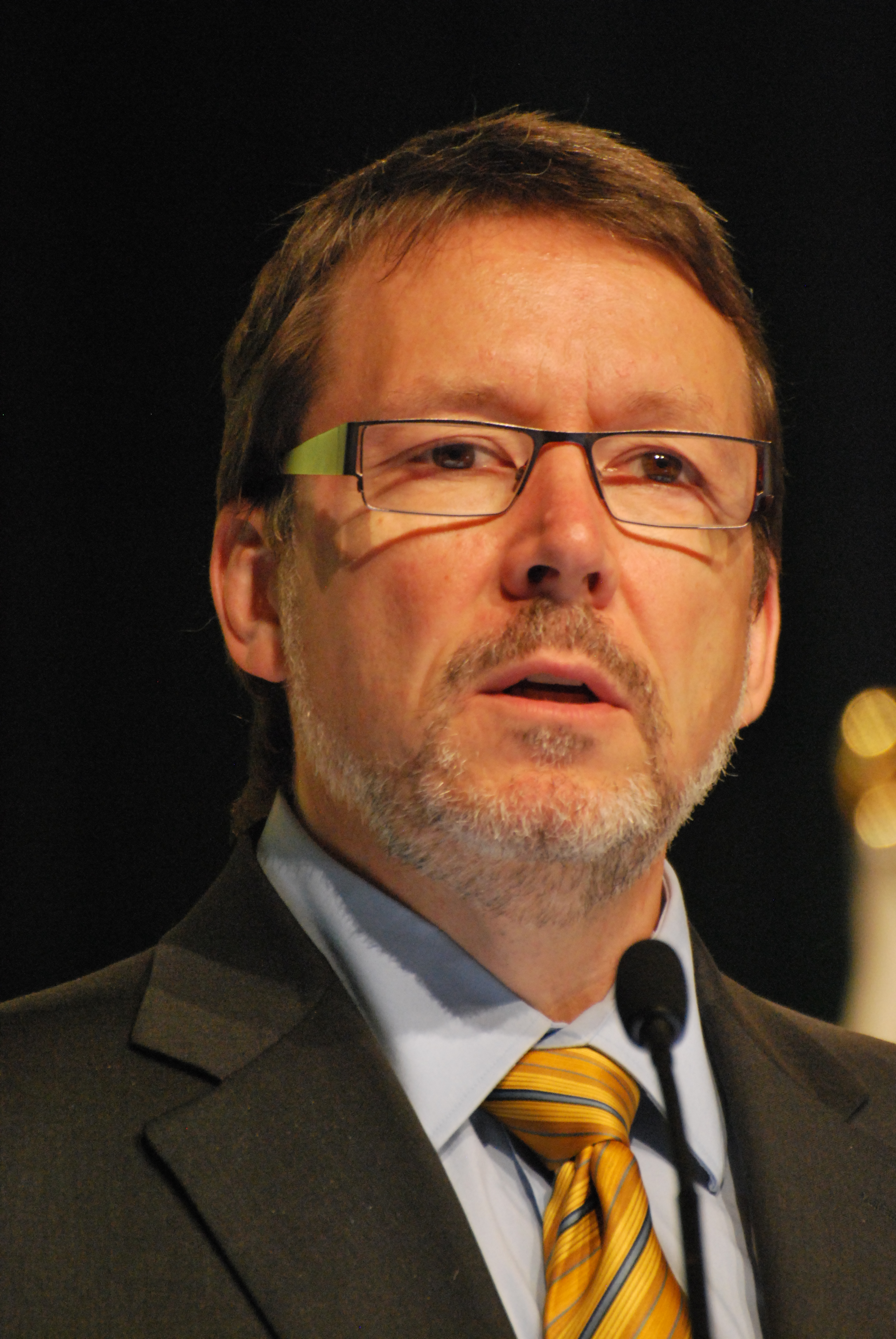
Michel Venne in 2012

Michel Venne (born 1960) is a Canadian journalist, author and intellectual. He was a columnist for the Montreal newspaper Le Devoir. He is founder and director of the Institut du Nouveau Monde. Venne is a vocal advocate of Quebec independence and of progressive, social democratic politics.

Venne studied communications at the Université du Québec à Montréal (UQÀM) and political science at Université Laval, in Quebec City. At Le Devoir, he has been parliamentary correspondent at the National Assembly of Quebec, editor, and news director. He is editor of L'annuaire du Québec, an exhaustive annual publication on Quebec affairs, sold in bookstores.

On June 23, 2021, Venne was found guilty of sexual assault against Quebec media personality Léa Clermont-Dion when she was a minor. The verdict of 6 months in prison was appealed. The appeal was dismissed on August 28, 2024.

== Bibliography ==
=== Author ===
- Vie privée et démocratie à l'ère de l'informatique (1994)
- Ces fascinantes inforoutes (1995)
- Les Porteurs de liberté (2001)
- Souverainistes, que faire? (2002)

=== Director ===
- Penser la nation québécoise (2000)
- La Révolution génétique (2001)
- Santé : Une thérapie de choc (2001)
- Justice, prospérité et démocratie. L'avenir du modèle québécois (2003)

== Awards ==
- Judith-Jasmin Award (1993)
- Michener Grant (1997)

== See also ==
- Politics of Quebec

== Sources ==
- Biography of Michel Venne at the Institut du Nouveau Monde website
