= Michel C. Auger =

Canadian journalist

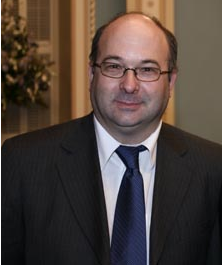
Michel C. Auger

Michel C. Auger is a Canadian journalist. He is a political columnist for Le Soleil, though until April 2006 he worked for Le Journal de Montréal. He is also the former president of the Fédération professionelle des journalistes du Québec (FPJQ).

Auger began his journalistic career in the newspaper Le Jour.

He has been a teacher of journalism in Africa.

He is a political analyst often called upon by the TVA and LCN television networks (owned by the Quebecor media conglomerate, like Le Journal de Montréal). He took part every week in the programme Indicatif présent on Première Chaîne for the segment called "Vindicatif Présent", until the departure of host Marie-France Bazzo that put an end to the legendary show in 2006.

From Fall 2013 to Spring 2015, he appeared on CBF-FM, Ici Radio-Canada Première's flagship station in Montreal, as host of the daily drive-time afternoon program Le 15-18. As of Fall 2015, he is the host of Première's nationwide midday news and discussion program, Midi Info; he is still heard on Le 15-18 as that program's political commentator.

He is the author of a book entitled "25 mythes à déboulonner en politique québécoise", which examines the relationship between Quebecers and the French language.

== See also ==
- Politics of Quebec
