= Alain Dubuc =

Alain Dubuc is a journalist and an economist from Montreal, Quebec, Canada. He is a columnist for Montreal's La Presse, Quebec City's Le Soleil and five other dailies in Quebec. He is a notable advocate of centre-right fiscal politics and federalism in Quebec.

== Biography ==
Alain Dubuc is the son of journalist Carl Dubuc. He earned a French baccalaureat at Collège Stanislas, an elite Roman Catholic private school. He went on to earn a master's degree in economics at the Université de Montréal.

From 1973 to 1976, he was researcher in econometrics for the Université de Montréal. In 1976, he became a La Presse columnist specialized in economics. From 1985 to 1988, he also hosted the weekly television show Questions d'argent on Radio-Québec (now Télé-Québec) on economics and personal finances. Dubuc was appointed chief editorialist of La Presse in 1988, a position he held until 2001, when he was succeeded by André Pratte.

In 2001, he was appointed president and editor of Le Soleil, a position he held until 2004. He has written about the sovereigntist Parti Québécois in Time Magazine.

== Works ==
- As Simple as Economics (1987)
- A Dialogue on Democracy in Canada (2002, with John Ralston Saul)
- Éloge de la richesse (2006)

== Awards ==
- National Business Award for Editorials from the Toronto Press Club and the Royal Bank of Canada (1982)
- Award for articles on energy from the Canadian Petroleum Association and the Calgary Press Club (1983)
- Journalism Award from the Quebec Foundation for Economic Education (1983)
- Great Montrealer of the Future in the Field of Journalism (1984)
- Annual Award for Economic Education from the Quebec Employers Council (1985)
- National Newspaper Award for editorial commentary (1999, 2000, and finalist in 2001)
- In 2011, he was made an Officer of the Order of Canada "for his contributions as a journalist, columnist and author covering economic and political issues in Canada".

== See also ==
- Politics of Quebec
