= Josée Legault =

Canadian journalist

Josée Legault (born 1960) is a Canadian journalist. She has been a political columnist for the English-language Montreal newspaper The Gazette, as well as for Le Devoir, L'actualité, and currently Le Journal de Montréal.

== Biography ==
Legault earned a degree in history and political science and subsequently taught at the Université du Québec à Montréal (UQÀM). Before the 1995 Quebec referendum, she published a report on the Charter of the French Language (Bill 101). From 1995 to 1998, she was a columnist for Le Devoir.

For the Quebec general election of 1998, she defied the party establishment and ran unsuccessfully for the PQ nomination in the Mercier riding for the Parti Québécois (PQ). Between 2001 and 2002, she was political counsellor for PQ Premier of Quebec Bernard Landry. The cessation of her employment at this post caused a minor controversy in sovereigntist ranks. The rumours were that she had conflicts with members of the Landry team, notably on the strategy to achieve sovereignty.

Perhaps her greatest moment of notoriety came during the 1995 referendum, when Liberal Senator Jacques Hébert called her a vache séparatiste or a separatist cow. Hébert was roundly criticized for the sexist and insulting remark, but efforts to galvanize separatist forces around this issue were unsuccessful.

Additionally to her columns, she was also a regular political panelist on CTV News and is also heard on the airwaves of radio stations CKAC (French language) and CJAD (English language).

== Bibliography ==
- L'invention d'une minorité: les Anglo-Québécois (1992)
- Les Nouveaux Démons (1996)

== See also ==
- Politics of Quebec
