= André Pratte =

Canadian journalist and politician (born 1957)

The Honourable André Pratte

Senator for Quebec
- In office March 18, 2016 – October 21, 2019
- Nominated by: Justin Trudeau
- Appointed by: David Johnston

Personal details
- Born: May 12, 1957 (age 69) Quebec City, Quebec, Canada
- Party: Independent Senators Group
- Occupation: Editor-in-chief
- Profession: journalist

André Pratte (born May 12, 1957) is a Canadian journalist and former senator who represented the De Salaberry division in Quebec. Before being appointed to the Senate by Prime Minister Justin Trudeau on March 18, 2016, Pratte was a journalist for over 35 years and was editor-in-chief of the Montreal newspaper La Presse. He was a member of the Independent Senators Group.

== Early and personal life ==
Pratte was born in Quebec City, Quebec and studied political science at the University of Montreal and graduated in 1980. Pratte's father, Yves Pratte (1925–1988), was a lawyer, chairperson of Air Canada (1968–1975), justice on the Supreme Court of Canada (1977–1979) and director of Power Corporation and Power Financial. His brother, Guy Pratte, is a partner at Borden Ladner Gervais. Guy Pratte, called to both the Ontario and Quebec Bar, received the Law Society of Ontario Medal in 2019 for exceptional career achievement and contribution to his community. He received the OBA Award of Excellence in Civil Litigation in 2019 from the Ontario Bar Association and was also named Advocatus Emeritus by the Québec Bar for "outstanding contributions to the legal profession."

== Journalism career ==
Before even finishing his degree, he was offered a position at CKAC, a francophone radio station in Montreal. Between 1979 and 1986, he worked there as a writer, reporter, parliamentary correspondent in Ottawa and deputy news editor.

In 1986, Pratte started his career in print journalism at La Presse and was employed by the paper until 2015. He worked as a columnist and political editor. Succeeding Alain Dubuc, he became editor-in-chief in 2001, defending the federalist and fiscally centre-right political stance of the paper.

In 1994, Pratte was suspended from La Presse after publishing a column entitled “Tout est pourri” [It's all rotten], in which he criticized Power Corporation, the newspaper's owner at the time. After pressure from the newspaper's union of journalists, he was reinstated in his role at La Presse.

In 2009, Pratte co-founded The Federal Idea, a Quebec-based, non-partisan think tank focused on federalism, and served as chair of its board of directors until 2014.

After leaving the senate, Pratte contributes for Postmedia properties such as the National Post and Montreal Gazette.

== Political career ==
=== Senate of Canada ===
Following a reform of the Senate appointment process, the goal of which was to make the Senate less partisan, Liberal Prime Minister Justin Trudeau appointed André Pratte on March 18, 2016, as part of the first wave of independent nominations.

Senator Pratte has sponsored four bills in the Upper House:

- 2016: Bill C-10, An Act to amend the Air Canada Public Participation Act and to provide for certain other measures
- 2017: Bill C-30, Canada–European Union Comprehensive Economic and Trade Agreement Implementation Act
- 2018: Bill C-86, Budget Implementation Act, 2018, No. 2
- 2019: Bill C-71, An Act to amend certain Acts and Regulations in relation to firearms

Pratte was Deputy Chair of the Standing Senate Committee on National Finance, a member of the Standing Senate Committee on Legal and Constitutional Affairs and a member of the Standing Senate Committee on National Security and Defence. He resigned his position on October 21, 2019, the date of the 2019 Canadian federal election.

=== Provincial politics ===
From 2023 to 2025, Pratte co-chaired the Quebec Liberal Party’s Consultation and Reflection Committee with MNA Madwa-Nika Cadet. In 2026, Pratte returned to PLQ's National Political Commission where he will be develop the party’s platform for the upcoming election.

== Publications ==
In 2005, Pratte was among the group who signed the manifesto "For a clear-eyed vision of Quebec", better known by the French title "Pour un Québec lucide" and critical of the social democratic 'Quebec Model'. Criticized by some sovereigntists, he has defended his neutrality and has claimed in the book Aux pays des merveilles to be a soft-nationalist and to have a soft-sovereigntist past (with claims of 'Yes' votes in both the 1980 and the 1995 Quebec referendums).

He published a number of books at VLB éditeur. The first, Le Syndrome de Pinocchio, discussed dishonesty in politics and earned him a motion of censure from the National Assembly of Quebec in 1997. He also published a biography of the future Premier of Quebec, Jean Charest, under the title L'Énigme Charest in 1997, drawing a paradoxical portrait of the man. He redirected his criticism upon his own journalistic profession in Les Oiseaux de malheur in 2000.

Pratte edited Reconquerir le Canada — un nouveau projet pour la nation québécoise (published in English as Reconquering Canada: Quebec Federalists Speak Up for Change), a book of essays by several prominent francophone Quebecers to better promote federalism in the province. The authors stated they want Quebec to have a greater role within the federation. Pratte said the province must be better linked with other provinces and that Quebecers must serve on bodies of the federal government. To make progress, Quebecers must change their view of federalism and Canada, and their perception of being a victim, which does not correspond with experience. The book counts 14 authors from various political affiliations: André Pratte, Daniel Fournier, Jean Leclair, Benoît Pelletier, Marie Bernard-Meunier, Patrice Ryan et Frédéric Bérard, François Pratte, Martin Cauchon, Pierre Gerlier-Forest, Hervé Rivet and Fabrice Rivault, Marc Garneau, Mathieu Laberge.

=== Bibliography ===
- 1997: Le Syndrome de Pinocchio [Pinocchio syndrome]
- 1998: L'Énigme Charest [The Charest enigma]
- 2000: Les Oiseaux de malheur [A bad omen]
- 2006: Aux pays des merveilles—Essai sur les mythes politiques québécois [Welcome to wonderland—An essay on political myths in Quebec]
- 2007: Reconquering Canada: Quebec Federalists Speak Up for Change
- 2008: Qui a raison? Lettres sur l'avenir du Québec [Who is right? Letters on the future of Quebec]
- 2011: Wilfrid Laurier
- 2016: Legacy: How French Canadians Shaped North America. (Ed., with Jonathan Kay; reprint 2019)
  - 2016: Batisseurs d'Amerique. Des Canadiens français qui ont fait l'histoire.
- 2017: Biographie d’un discours—Wilfrid Laurier à Québec le 26 juin 1877 [Biography of a speech–Wilfrid Laurier in Quebec City on June 26, 1877]

== Awards ==
Pratte won the National Newspaper Award for editorial writing in 2007, 2008 and 2010.
