= Michel David =

Canadian journalist (born 1951)

Michel David (born 1951) is a Canadian journalist and is a columnist for the Montreal, Quebec, Canada, newspaper Le Devoir.

David became a journalist in 1978. He was the parliamentary correspondent at the National Assembly of Quebec for Quebec City's Le Soleil from 1980 to 1991 and became President of the press gallery at the end of the 1980s. From 1994 to 2001, he was a regular contributor to the English-language Montreal paper The Gazette. Now a columnist for the newspaper Le Devoir, he contributes each year to its publication of a bulletin (report card), giving grades to prominent Members of the National Assembly for their work during the year. His columns tend to show subtle humour and slight cynicism.

After the 2001 resignation of Lucien Bouchard, he published, with Quebec City cartoonist André-Philippe Côté, Les années Bouchard, a book on the former Parti Québécois Premier of Quebec. The book compiled political cartoons of Bouchard drawn by Côté; David provided commentaries and Bouchard, himself, the foreword.

== See also ==
- List of Quebec media
- Politics of Quebec
