= Eric R. Scott =

Canadian filmmaker

Eric Richard Scott is a Canadian filmmaker working in Montreal, Quebec, Canada. He has been working in television and documentary film making since the early 1980s and also works as a researcher for television programs. Scott also runs his own production company, Les Productions des Quatres Jeudis Inc.

== Filmography ==
- Le Rêve américain (1993)
- Voting to Separate (1994)
- Je me souviens (2002)
- Checkpoint: The Battle for Israel's Soul (2003)
- The Other Zionists (2004)
- Leaving the Fold (2008)
- Outremont et les Hasidim (2019)
