= Commission on the Political and Constitutional Future of Quebec =

Quebec commission

The Commission on the Political and Constitutional Future of Quebec, also known as the Bélanger-Campeau Commission, was established by the Lieutenant Governor of Quebec, at the initiative of Premier Robert Bourassa, after the demise of the Meech Lake Accord. The commission was mandated to examine the political and constitutional status of Quebec and to make recommendations for changes. The Bélanger-Campeau Report was published in 1991 and revised in 2002.

== Co-chairman ==
- Michel Bélanger
- Jean Campeau

== Deputies of the Liberal Party of Quebec ==
- Robert Bourassa
- Gil Rémillard
- Claude Ryan
- Louise Bégin
- Guy Bélanger
- Claude Dauphin
- Claire-Hélène Hovington
- Cosmo Maciocia
- Christiane Pelchat
- Russ Williams

== Deputies of the Parti québécois ==
- Jacques Parizeau
- Jeanne Blackburn
- Jacques Brassard
- Guy Chevrette
- Louise Harel
- Jacques Léonard
- Pauline Marois

== Other sovereignist commissioners ==
- Lucien Bouchard
- Jean-Claude Beaumier
- Claude Béland
- Louis Laberge
- Gérald Larose
- Roger Nicolet
- Serge Turgeon
- Lorraine Pagé
- Jacques Proulx

== Other federalist commissioners ==
- Marcel Beaudry
- Cheryl Campbell Steer
- Ghislain Dufour
- Guy D'Anjou
- Jean-Pierre Hogue
- Richard Holden
- Charles-Albert Poissant
- André Ouellet

== See also ==
- Allaire Report
- Distinct society
- Quebec nationalism
- Quebec federalism
- Quebec sovereigntism
- Robert Bourassa's speech on the end of the Meech Lake Accord
- Politics of Quebec
- History of Quebec
