= National question (Quebec) =

Discussion about the future status of Quebec within Canada

The national question (in French: la question nationale) is an expression referring to the discussion about the future status of Quebec within Canada, taking into consideration issues of autonomy, sovereignty, and independence.

== Various political positions in answer to the national question ==
- Quebec sovereignty movement
  - Independence with an economic union with Canada
  - Independence without an economic union with Canada
- Quebec federalism
  - Further autonomy within the Canadian federation, along with national recognition as a distinct society and autonomous province separate from other provinces in country
  - Asymmetrical federalism
  - Status quo

== See also ==
- Politics of Quebec
- 1980 Quebec referendum
- 1995 Quebec referendum

=== Nationalism ===
- État Québécois
- Commission on the Political and Constitutional Future of Quebec
- Robert Bourassa's speech on the end of the Meech Lake Accord
- Quebec nationalism

=== Sovereigntism ===
- Sovereigntist events and strategies
- Quebec sovereigntism

=== Federalism ===
- Meech Lake Accord
- Charlottetown Accord
- Distinct society
- Quebec federalist ideology
- Quebec autonomism
