= Le Jour =

- Type: Daily newspaper
- Format: Broadsheet
- Owner: Cooperative
- Editor: Yves Michaud
- Founded: 1973
- Ceased publication: 1978
- Political alignment: Sovereigntism, Social democracy
- Headquarters: Saint-Laurent, Quebec
- Circulation: 30,000 (first issue)
- Website: None

Le Jour (French for "The Day") was a Quebec independence newspaper. It was founded in Saint-Laurent, near Montreal, by Yves Michaud, Jacques Parizeau and René Lévesque. Michaud was editor-in-chief. The paper was published as a daily from 1974 to 1976, and again as a weekly from 1977 to 1978.

== History ==
Initially, Michaud considered Le Québec as a title and a test print bore that name. Finally named Le Jour, its first issue was published on February 28, 1974. With 30,000 copies printed, it became the 14th daily in Quebec. Editor-in-chief Michaud wrote that "[t]his newspaper shall be independentist, social-democrat, national and free". The paper was the property of a cooperative of which the Parti Québécois (PQ), then led by Lévesque, owned 5% of the shares.

Around Michaud was a team composed of assistant editor-in-chief Evelyn Dumas, Gil Courtemanche, Michel C. Auger, Jacques Guay, Paule Beaugrand-Champagne, Laurent Laplante, Jacques Keable and Jean-Pierre Fournier. René Lévesque, journalist by profession, held a column in its pages and cartoonist Berthio was a collaborator. Le Jour covered such subjects as politics, culture, economics, consumption and sports. It gave notable space to the then-emerging Quebec comic strips scene. It excluded advertisers that the newspaper deemed not to be in line with its ideals, like financial institutions because of what it saw as unfair fees (Michaud would become known for fighting against this, earning the nickname "Robin des banques").

The last issue of the daily edition was published on August 24, 1976, three months before the first election won by the PQ on November 15, 1976. Finances had become difficult. A weekly edition with a different staff was published from February 1977 and January 1978. While other Quebec newspapers would eventually come to be in favour of sovereignty (like Le Devoir), the next one to be specifically devoted to it would be Le Québécois (although different in many regards), founded in 2001 in Quebec City.

== See also ==
- List of sovereigntist media
- List of Quebec historical newspapers
- List of Quebec media
- Quebec sovereignty movement
- Quebec nationalism
- Politics of Quebec
- List of newspapers in Canada

== Bibliography ==
- "28 février 1974 - Parution du quotidien souverainiste «Le Jour»" at Bilan du Siècle
- "Le Jour (Saint-Laurent, Île-de-Montréal, Québec)" at the Bibliothèque et Archives nationales du Québec
- Radio interview of Yves Michaud about the upcoming first issue and assorted information at the SRC archives
