= Province-building =

Canadian political term

Province-building is a term in Canadian political science which refers to the efforts of provincial governments to become prominent actors in lives of, and focus of loyalty for, people living within those provinces. It is related both to nation-building, process of constructing or structuring a national identity using the power of the state, and state-building, enhancing the capacity of state institutions and building state-society relations.

The Constitution of Canada, beginning with the British North America Act, 1867, delegates powers between the federal government and the provinces. These powers have been expanded over time by judicial rulings and successful provincial lobbying. Surveys of public opinion in Canada show that healthcare and education rank as the "most important issues" in the minds of Canadians, and both those spheres are delegated to the provinces.

Canadian provinces are also endowed with many symbols and myths that attract loyalty in much the same way as do nation states. Many of them had long histories as separate British colonies before joining Canada. They have distinct flags and coats of arms, official provincial institutions such as museums, and separate media markets that cater to provincial affairs. Furthermore, their provincial heads of government, the premiers, are often considered the provinces' representatives in national affairs, called "executive federalism". This contrasts with other federations such as the United States and Australia where the upper house of the legislature is considered to be responsible for defending the rights of the states against the federal government.

Provincial loyalties also intersect with ethnic and linguistic ones. This is most true of Quebec, where the provincial government views itself as the guarantor of the "national" culture of Quebec. Quebec nationalists often view the provincial government as the basis on which to build the État québécois, the Quebec State. Political movements in other provinces have also tried to use the provincial government as a force to build provincial autonomy and safeguard local identity. For example, in the 1930s the province of Alberta sought to print its own currency and impose regulations on the major banks which were all based outside of the province. From the 1940s to the 1970s the government of Saskatchewan attempted to build a social democratic society in that province, and "provincialized" many industries including automobile insurance, medical insurance, electricity generation, telecommunications, and potash mining.

In the 2020s, province-building returned in the form of the Saskatchewan First Act, the Alberta Sovereignty Within a United Canada Act, and Bills 96 (amendments to the Charter of the French Language) and 21 (the Act respecting the laicity of the State).
