= Jean Charest =

Premier of Quebec from 2003 to 2012 (born 1958)

The Honourable Jean Charest PC
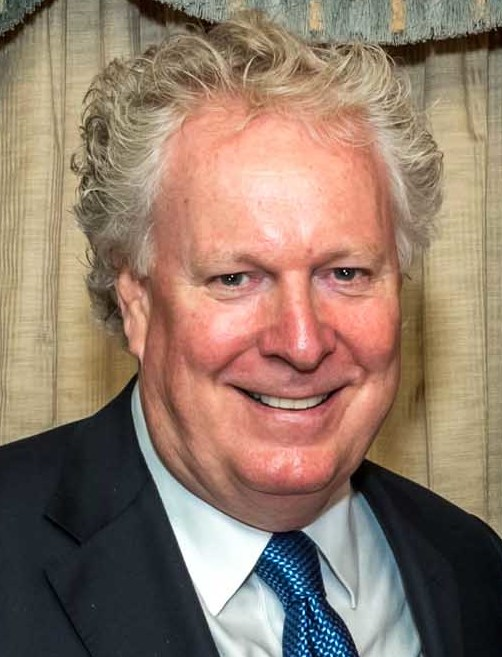
- Charest in 2017

29th Premier of Quebec
- In office April 29, 2003 – September 19, 2012
- Monarch: Elizabeth II
- Lieutenant Governor: Lise Thibault; Pierre Duchesne
- Deputy: See list: Monique Gagnon-Tremblay; Jacques Dupuis; Nathalie Normandeau; Line Beauchamp; Michelle Courchesne
- Preceded by: Bernard Landry
- Succeeded by: Pauline Marois

5th Deputy Prime Minister of Canada
- In office June 25, 1993 – November 4, 1993
- Prime Minister: Kim Campbell
- Preceded by: Don Mazankowski
- Succeeded by: Sheila Copps
Leadership positions
Leader of the Opposition in Quebec
In office April 30, 1998 – April 29, 2003
Preceded by	Monique Gagnon-Tremblay
Succeeded by	Bernard Landry
Leader of the Quebec Liberal Party
In office April 30, 1998 – September 5, 2012
Preceded by	Monique Gagnon-Tremblay (interim)
Succeeded by	Jean-Marc Fournier (interim)
Leader of the Progressive Conservative Party of Canada
In office December 14, 1993 – April 2, 1998; Interim: December 14, 1993 – April 29, 1995
Preceded by	Kim Campbell
Succeeded by	Elsie Wayne (interim)
Canadian cabinet
Minister of Industry
In office June 25, 1993 – November 4, 1993
Prime Minister	Kim Campbell
Preceded by	Pierre H. Vincent (Minister of Consumer and Corporate Affairs; Registrar General of Canada); Michael Wilson (Minister of Industry, Science and Technology)
Succeeded by	John Manley
Minister of the Environment
In office April 21, 1991 – June 24, 1993
Prime Minister	Brian Mulroney
Preceded by	Robert de Cotret
Succeeded by	Pierre H. Vincent
Minister of State (Fitness and Amateur Sport)
In office March 31, 1988 – January 23, 1990
Prime Minister	Brian Mulroney
Minister	Jake Epp; Perrin Beatty
Preceded by	Otto Jelinek
Succeeded by	Marcel Danis
Minister of State (Youth)
In office June 30, 1986 – January 23, 1990
Prime Minister	Brian Mulroney
Minister	David Crombie; Lucien Bouchard; Gerry Weiner
Preceded by	Andrée Champagne
Succeeded by	Marcel Danis
House of Commons roles
Deputy Speaker of the House of Commons Assistant Deputy Chair of the Committees of the Whole
In office October 31, 1984 – June 29, 1986
Speaker	John Bosley
Preceded by	Jacques Guilbault
Succeeded by	Andrée Champagne
Parliamentary constituencies
Member of the National Assembly of Quebec for Sherbrooke
In office November 30, 1998 – September 4, 2012
Preceded by	Marie Malavoy
Succeeded by	Serge Cardin
Member of Parliament for Sherbrooke
In office September 4, 1984 – April 30, 1998
Preceded by	Irénée Pelletier
Succeeded by	Serge Cardin

Personal details
- Born: John James Charest; June 24, 1958 (age 68) Sherbrooke, Quebec, Canada
- Party: Conservative (federal); Liberal (provincial)
- Other political affiliations: Progressive Conservative (before 2003)
- Spouse: Michèle Dionne (m. 1980)
- Children: 3, including Antoine
- Education: Université de Sherbrooke
- Website: www.jeancharest.ca

John James "Jean" Charest (French pronunciation: [ʒɑ̃ ʃɑʁɛ]; born June 24, 1958) is a Canadian lawyer and former politician who served as the 29th premier of Quebec from 2003 to 2012. Prior to that, he was a member of Parliament (MP) between 1984 and 1998. After holding several Cabinet posts from 1986 to 1990 and from 1991 to 1993, he was the leader of the Progressive Conservative Party of Canada from 1993 to 1998.

Born in Sherbrooke, Quebec, Charest worked as a lawyer before becoming an MP following the 1984 federal election. In 1986 he joined Brian Mulroney's government as a minister of state, but resigned from cabinet in 1990 after improperly speaking to a judge about an active court case. He returned to cabinet in 1991 as the minister of the environment. Charest ran to succeed Mulroney as party leader and prime minister in the PCs' 1993 leadership election, but placed second to Kim Campbell. Charest served as Campbell's industry minister and deputy prime minister. After the PCs' defeat in the 1993 election, Charest succeeded Campbell as party leader. He led the PCs to a minor recovery in the 1997 election.

Charest left federal politics in 1998 and was elected to lead the Quebec Liberal Party, the province's main federalist political party. He became premier of Quebec after the Liberals won the 2003 provincial election. He won two more elections until he lost the 2012 election to the sovereigntist Parti Quebecois (PQ) and resigned as premier. After politics, Charest worked as a consultant, including for Huawei on the Meng Wanzhou case and for its 5G network plans in Canada, and joined McCarthy Tétrault LLP as a partner. Charest was a candidate in the 2022 Conservative Party of Canada leadership election, finishing a distant second to Pierre Poilievre.

== Early life and education ==
Charest was born on June 24, 1958, in Sherbrooke, in Quebec's Eastern Townships. His parents are Rita (née Leonard), an Irish Quebecer, and Claude "Red" Charest, a French Canadian. He obtained a law degree from the Université de Sherbrooke and was admitted to the Barreau du Québec in 1981. He is married to Michèle Dionne (since June 21, 1980), and they have three children, Amélie, Antoine, and Alexandra.

Charest is fully bilingual in French and English. In the 1980 Quebec referendum, he failed to vote because he was getting married.

== Federal politics (1984–1998) ==
Charest worked as a lawyer until he was elected Progressive Conservative member of the Parliament of Canada for the riding (electoral district) of Sherbrooke in the 1984 election. From 1984 to 1986, Charest served as Assistant Deputy Chair of Committees of the Whole of the House of Commons.

=== Minister of state (1986–1990) ===
In 1986, at age 28, Charest was appointed to the Cabinet of Prime Minister Brian Mulroney as minister of state (youth). He was the youngest cabinet minister in Canadian history.

Charest was appointed minister of state (fitness and amateur sport) in 1988, but had to resign from cabinet in 1990 after improperly speaking to a judge about a case regarding the Canadian Track and Field Association.

=== Role in Meech Lake Accord (1990–1991) ===
Charest was involved in the proposal of the Meech Lake Accord (which failed to be ratified in June 1990) which would have given the province of Quebec the status of a "distinct society", extend provincial powers, and extensively change the constitution. In 1990, he led a committee that recommended a companion accord that would address the concerns of other provinces, assert that the distinct society clause would be subject to the Charter, and would feature greater protections for minority language rights in the provinces. The recommendations caused Mulroney's environment minister and Quebec lieutenant, Lucien Bouchard, to view the companion accord as a betrayal of Meech. Bouchard later resigned from Cabinet and founded the Bloc Québécois, a pro-sovereigntist party.

=== Minister of the environment (1991–1993) ===
Charest returned to cabinet as minister of the environment in 1991. In that role, he led the Canadian delegation at the 1992 Earth Summit in Rio de Janeiro, Brazil.

=== 1993 PC leadership bid ===
When Mulroney announced his retirement as PC leader and prime minister, Charest was a candidate for the leadership of the party at the 1993 Progressive Conservative leadership convention.

Karlheinz Schreiber alleged he gave $30,000 in cash to Charest's campaign for the Tory leadership in 1993. However Charest himself says it was only $10,000 although federal leadership election rules permitted such cash donations. As of 2007, rules against such donations for provincial party leadership campaigns still do not exist in Québec.

Charest placed a strong second to Defence Minister Kim Campbell, who had held a large lead going into the convention. Charest served as Deputy Prime Minister and Minister of Industry, Science and Technology in Campbell's short-lived cabinet.

=== PC Party leader (1993–1998) ===
In the 1993 election, the PCs suffered the worst defeat for a governing party at the federal level. Only two of the party's 295 candidates were elected, Charest and Elsie Wayne. Charest himself was re-elected fairly handily in Sherbrooke, taking 56 per cent of the vote. As the only surviving member of what turned out to be the last PC Cabinet, Charest was appointed interim party leader and confirmed in the post in April 1995. Charest, therefore, became the first person of francophone descent to lead the Progressive Conservative Party.

Charest participated in the 1994 class of the World Economic Forum's Global Leaders for Tomorrow program.

During the 1995 referendum on Quebec's sovereignty, Charest was vice-president of the "No" campaign (Comité national des Québécoises et des Québécois pour le NON).

In the 1997 federal election, Charest campaigned on securing national unity in Canada by recognizing Quebec as being a distinct society within Canada, along with the proposal of a "New Covenant" for Canadian confederation to be negotiated between the federal and provincial governments. Charest and the PCs benefited from rapidly rising in popularity amongst all language groups in Quebec, where voters were found to have preferred Charest over Gilles Duceppe, the leader of the Bloc Québécois. In the election, the Tories received 18.8 per cent of the popular vote and won 20 seats, mostly in Atlantic Canada. Although the party's seat count had recovered (as they won only two seats in 1993), Charest considered the result a disappointment. While the Tories finished only half a point behind Reform in terms of the popular vote, their support was too dispersed west of Quebec to translate into seats. They were also hampered by vote-splitting with Reform in rural central Ontario, a traditional Tory stronghold where Reform had made significant inroads.

== Early provincial political career (1998–2003) ==
In April 1998, Charest gave in to considerable public and political pressure, especially among business circles, to leave federal politics and become leader of the Quebec Liberal Party. Charest was considered by many to be the best hope for the federalist QLP to defeat the sovereigntist Parti Québécois government.

In the 1998 election, the Quebec Liberals received more votes than the PQ, but because the Liberal vote was concentrated in fewer ridings, the PQ won enough seats to form another majority government. Charest won his own riding of Sherbrooke with a majority of 907 votes.

In the April 2003 election, Charest led the Quebec Liberals to a majority, ending nine years of PQ rule. He declared he had a mandate to reform health care, cut taxes, reduce spending and reduce the size of government. Charest's Liberals won 76 seats, forming a majority government, and won his own riding of Sherbrooke with a majority of 2,597 votes.

== Premier of Quebec (2003–2012) ==
=== Economic policy ===
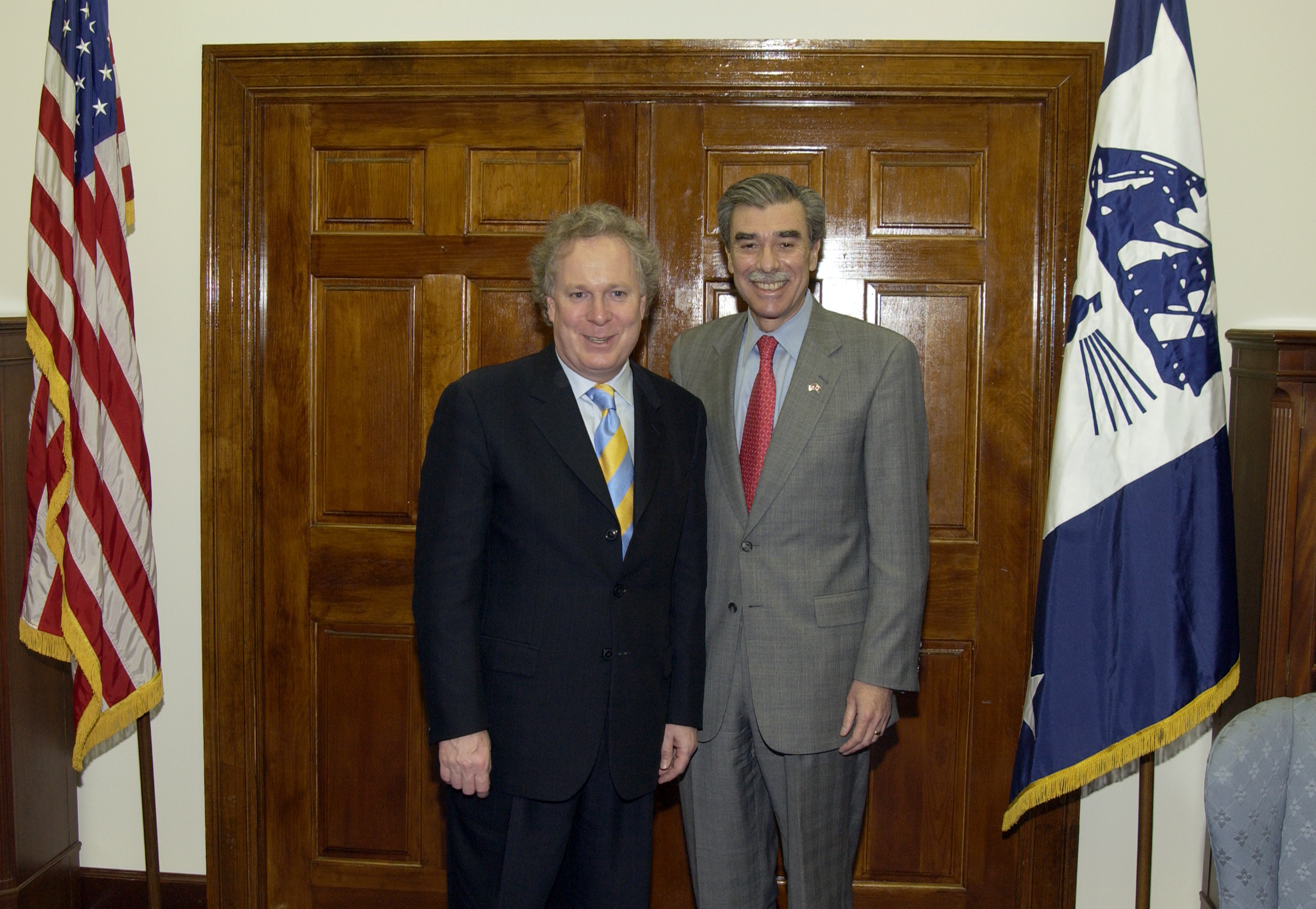
Charest with US Secretary of Commerce Carlos Gutierrez in April 2005

Charest increased the Quebec sales tax (QST) thrice. In 2011, his government raised the rate from 7.5 per cent to 8.5 per cent before raising it to 9.5 per cent in 2012. The third and last hike came into effect in 2013, with the rate rising to 9.975 per cent.

In October 2007, Quebec became the first province in Canada to implement a carbon tax. At the time it was implemented, the tax amounted to 0.8 cents per litre of gas and 0.9 cents per litre of diesel fuel.

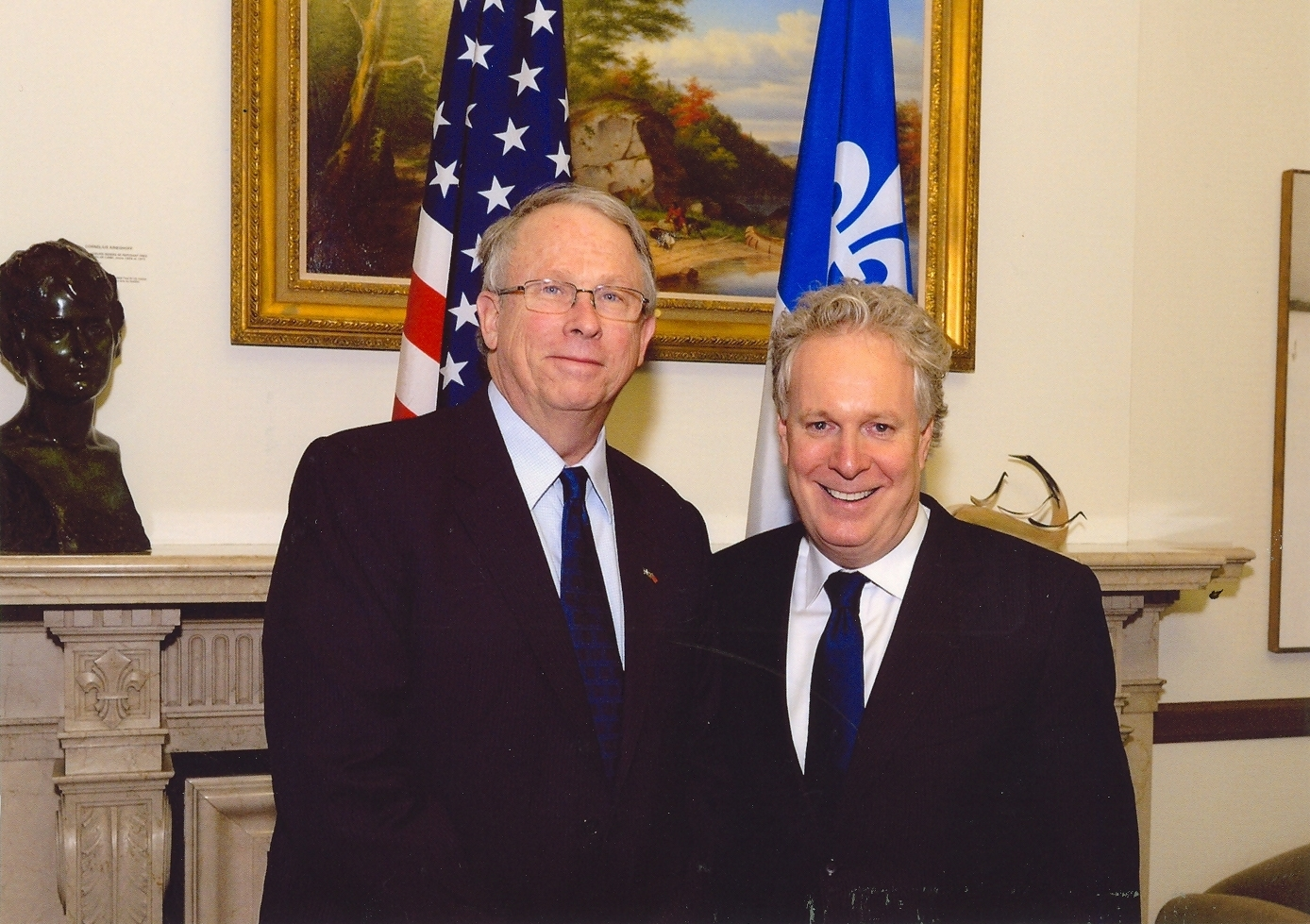
Charest with United States Consul General Peter O'Donohue in November 2010

Much of the fiscal policy of the Charest government was based upon the expectation that new revenues could be obtained from a resolution of the fiscal imbalance believed to exist between the federal and provincial governments. The Harper government was widely expected to address this issue through increased equalization payments, while falling short of Quebec's overall demands.

Charest was an early proponent of free trade with the European Union, which eventually manifested in the 2016 Comprehensive Economic and Trade Agreement.

==== Plan Nord ====
In May 2011, Charest's government launched the Plan Nord, an economic development strategy to develop the natural resources extraction sector in the part of Quebec to the north of the 49th parallel. The plan, to be carried out over 25 years, would foster over C$80 billion in energy, mining, and forestry investments and create or consolidate 20,000 jobs a year for the duration. The proposed plan, described as "a potential centrepiece" of Charest's political legacy, received the full support of the mining industry, the Crees and Inuit representatives but was met with scepticism and downright opposition by the Innus and most environmentalists.

=== Environmental policy ===
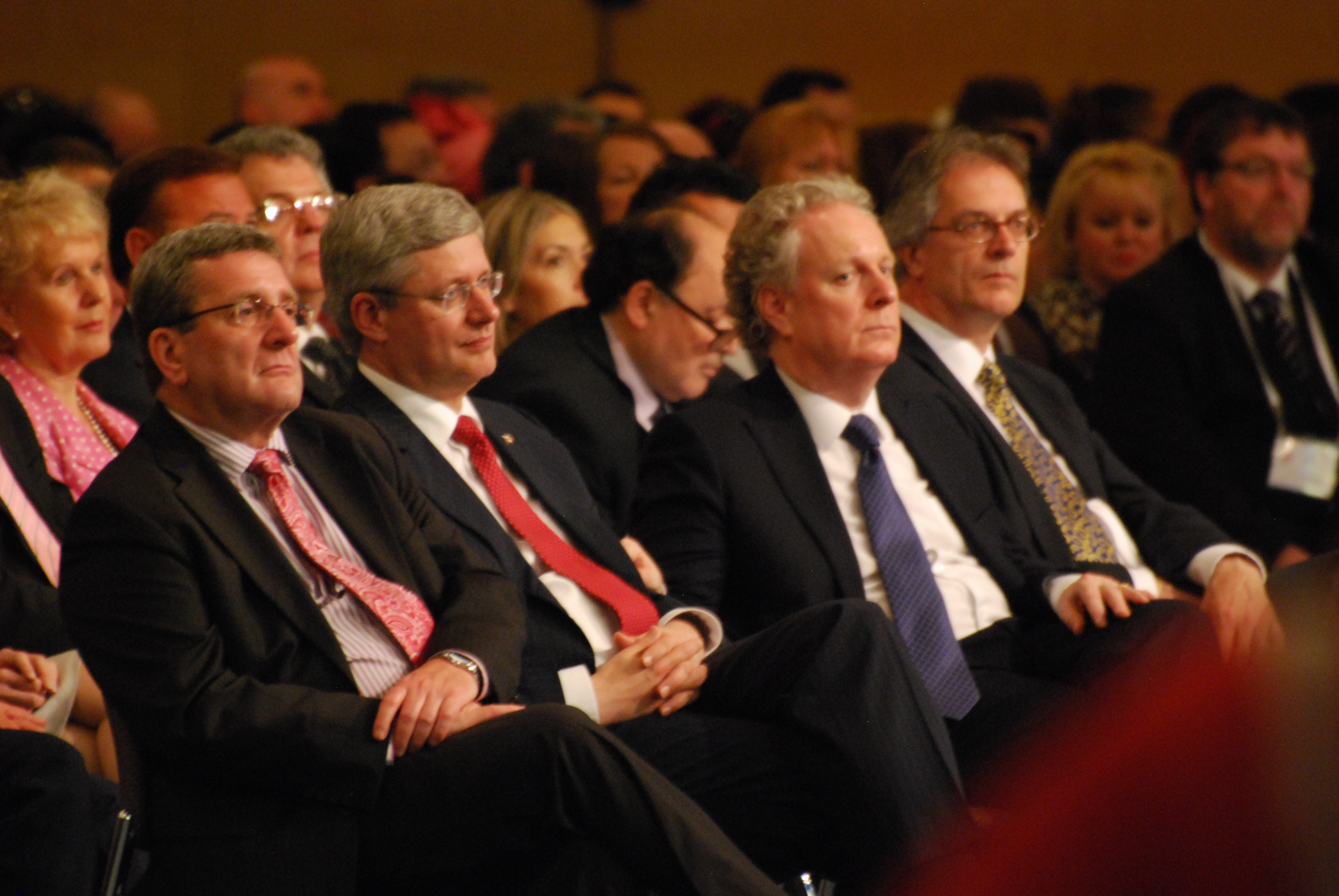
Régis Labeaume (left), Stephen Harper (centre) and Jean Charest at the Forum mondial de la langue française in Quebec City on July 2, 2012.

Charest also attempted to distinguish himself on the issue of the environment. His vocal opposition to the federal decision to opt out of the Kyoto Accord, and his insistence that Quebec would seek to meet its own Kyoto targets has earned him considerable support. His government set ambitious greenhouse gas reduction targets, petroleum royalties, and a 2011-2020 Action Plan for Electric Vehicles. He also established the Sustainable Development Act, which adds to the Charter of Rights and Freedoms the right for every person to live in a healthful environment in which biodiversity is preserved. In 2012, Charest was awarded the Fray International Sustainability Award for his work and advocacy towards sustainable development in politics.

=== Other policy ===
In the 2003 election, Charest had promised to allow the cities that had been forcibly merged by the Parti Québécois government to hold referendums which would allow to demerge and return to their previous situation. This promise was seen as key to his victory in many ridings, such as those in the suburbs around Longueuil and Quebec City and the continued support of the Anglophone community in the West Island of Montreal. In office, however, Charest retreated from his promise. Municipalities were allowed to hold demerger referendums if at least 10 per cent of the electorate signed a petition calling for them, and only if more than 35 per cent participated in the voting process. In some former municipalities, such as Saint Laurent on the Island of Montreal, the turnout of the vote was of 75.2 per cent in favour of a demerger, but it was invalidated because the voter turnout was just 28.6 per cent.

The demerger process also resulted in the restructuring of the existing megacities, with both these and the demerged cities handing over massive powers over taxation and local services to the new "agglomeration councils". The makeup of these councils was based on the population of the municipalities involved, with the mayors having the right to unilaterally appoint all of the individuals who would represent their cities on the council. The resulting structure was seen by many to be less democratic than the one which had preceded it, as demerged municipalities were denied an effective voice, and the city councils of the major cities were substantially weakened by the power of the mayors to go over the heads of opposition councillors and exercise power through their appointees to the agglomeration body.

During his mandate as Premier, Charest made some efforts to expand the place of Québec in the international community. The province was granted representation at UNESCO, the cultural branch of the United Nations. Charest also voiced some support for the Calgary Declaration (1997), which recognized Quebec as "unique."

During the debate in the Parliament of Canada over recognizing Quebec as a nation within Canada, Charest stated that Quebec was a "nation" no matter what other parts of Canada said—that this was not up to anyone else to define.

=== 2012 student protests ===
In 2011, the Charest government decided to increase the tuition fees in all Quebec universities. Three major student unions began to organise demonstrations in Montreal and in Quebec City. In March 2012, many CEGEPs and universities voted for a student strike. The government faced major challenges when students demonstrated and went on strike by boycotting classes to protest planned tuition increases. Every month large demonstrations took place in several cities across Quebec. The Premier and his government were accused by some, including the students unions, the PQ and Québec Solidaire of being too hard. On May 4, 2012, the Quebec Liberal Party held a party conference in Victoriaville and a student demonstration was suppressed by Sûreté du Québec police. On May 14, 2012, then Deputy Premier and Education minister, Line Beauchamp resigned and Michelle Courchesne was appointed Deputy Premier and Minister of Education. The government passed Bill 78 to impose restrictions on protests; this caused controversy, with the Barreau du Québec, among others, expressing concern about possible infringement of constitutional rights. Bill 78 was revoked by the Pauline Marois government.

=== Controversies ===
On December 6, 2007, the Opposition urged Charest to testify to the House of Commons of Canada Ethics Committee in its investigation of Karlheinz Schreiber. Schreiber told the committee he paid $30,000 in cash to Charest's brother to help fund Charest's 1993 leadership bid for the federal Progressive Conservative party.

Charest's third term was marked by several allegations of questionable financing from the Quebec Liberal Party as well as a multitude of scandals in the construction sector in Quebec, the loss of $39.8 billion from the Caisse de dépôt et placement du Québec, and the Marc Bellemare (Charest's former justice minister) affair. Bellemare alleged in 2010 that he had been pressured by Quebec Liberal fundraisers during the appointment of judges in 2003. In response, the Charest government created the Bastarache commission, where Charest testified in defence. Charest however refused to launch a public inquiry into the collusion and financing of political parties and corruption in the construction industry, despite a 2011 survey indicating that 77 per cent of Quebecers demanded such an inquiry. Charest finally launched an inquiry in 2012 through the creation of the Charbonneau commission in response to rising discontent within the Quebec Liberal caucus.

=== Elections ===
==== 2007 Quebec election ====
The Charest government was deeply unpopular during its first years in office, with a public approval rating of below 50 per cent in most opinion polls and falling to the low twenties in voter support. In the first few weeks after André Boisclair was elected leader of the PQ, polls showed that Charest and the Liberals would be roundly defeated in the next election. Boisclair did not perform well as Leader of the Opposition, and Charest's numbers recovered somewhat. A poll conducted by Léger Marketing for Le Devoir placed the Liberals at 34 per cent against 32 per cent for the PQ and 24 per cent for the ADQ, with Charest obtaining a higher personal approval rating than the PQ leader. Liberal support, however remained heavily concentrated in Anglophone and Allophone ridings in the west of Montreal, meaning that the increase in support would not necessarily translate into seats.

On February 21, 2007, Charest asked the Lieutenant-Governor to dissolve the National Assembly and call an election on March 26, 2007. Charest conducted an extraordinary session the day before with Finance Minister Michel Audet delivering the 2007 budget.

Prior to his call for an election, Charest revealed his platform which included income tax cuts of about $250 million. In the last week of the campaign, Charest promised an additional $700 million in tax cuts—some of it coming for the additional equalization money from the 2007 federal budget; reduction of hospital wait times; improvement and increase of French courses at school; an increase of the number of daycare spaces; and an increase in tuition fees for university students ($50 per semester until 2012). The last measure was met with criticism from students' associations, and a more-radical student association, the Association pour une solidarité syndicale étudiante (formerly known as the CASSEE) had also considered a strike.

Charest won a minority government in the election, and held onto his own seat. On election night, early numbers had shown Charest losing his seat of Sherbrooke to his PQ opponent; however, this situation was reversed once it became apparent that the advanced poll ballot boxes which heavily favoured Charest had not yet been counted. The resulting minority government was the first since 1878 when Charles Boucher de Boucherville was Premier.

==== 2008 Quebec election ====
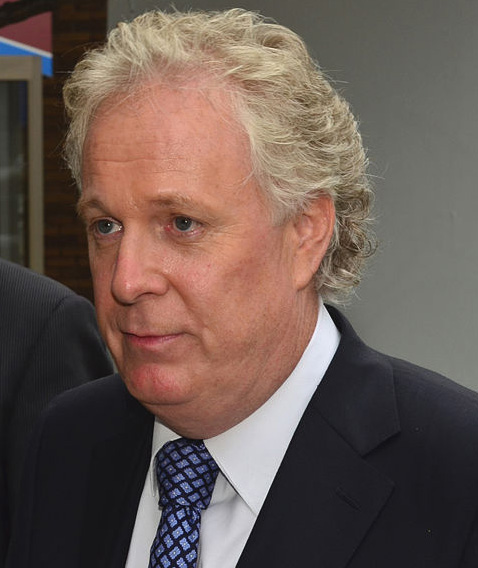
Charest in 2012

In November 2008, arguing that Quebecers needed a majority government during difficult economic times, Charest called a snap election for December 8. His party captured a historic third consecutive term as he brought the Liberals back to majority governance. It was the first time a party had won a third consecutive term in Quebec since the Quiet Revolution.

==== 2012 Quebec election ====
On August 1, 2012, Charest launched his electoral campaign for the 2012 Quebec general election from the Quebec Jean-Lesage International Airport with the slogan For Quebec. The QLP focused its campaign on the issues of respect of the law and civil order, referencing the demonstrations of the previous months. They claimed to be the party of the silent majority who did not support the student protest movement. It was the first provincial election in Quebec to feature the newly formed CAQ party led by François Legault on the ballot. On the night of September 4, Charest and his party lost the general election. The result was a hung parliament, with the Parti Québécois of Pauline Marois being the party with the most seats (54). The Quebec Liberal Party became the official opposition with 50 seats. Charest lost his own seat of Sherbrooke in the Eastern Townships, a seat that he had held since 1984, both in the federal and provincial legislatures. Charest announced on September 5 in Quebec City that he would resign as Quebec Liberal Party leader.

== Post-premiership ==
Charest was formerly a consultant for Huawei and helped support and advise Huawei for its participation for 5G network plans in Canada and to be a partner with McCarthy Tétrault LLP. Charest also claims he helped with the Meng Wanzhou case.

After turning 65 in June 2023, Charest reached the mandatory retirement age for equity partners at McCarthy Tétrault. While the law firm offered to keep him on a counsel role, Charest refused. In January 2024, Charest decided to leave McCarthy Tétrault and joined the Therrien Couture Joli-Cœur group.

After Mark Carney won the 2025 Liberal Party of Canada leadership election, his team reached out to Charest for a senior role, possibly as a cabinet minister, but Charest declined, only being willing to accept a post from Carney if the Liberals formed government after a federal election.

=== 2022 Conservative leadership bid ===
On March 9, 2022, Charest announced that he would be a candidate for the 2022 Conservative Party of Canada leadership election. He had previously considered running in the 2020 leadership election, though he ultimately decided not to.

With 16 per cent of the points, Charest finished a distant second to winner Pierre Poilievre, who took 68 per cent of points on the first ballot.

== Honours ==
- 125th Anniversary of the Confederation of Canada Medal (1992)
- Queen Elizabeth II Golden Jubilee Medal (2002)
- Bavarian Order of Merit (2007)
- Commander of France's Legion of Honour (February 2, 2009)

Ribbon bars of The Honourable Jean Charest

== See also ==
- List of premiers of Quebec
- Politics of Canada
- Politics of Quebec

25th Canadian Ministry (1993) – Cabinet of Kim Campbell
Cabinet posts (3)
Predecessor	Office	Successor
Don Mazankowski	Deputy Prime Minister of Canada; June 25 – November 4, 1993	Sheila Copps
Michael Wilson	Minister of Industry, Science and Technology; June 25 – November 4, 1993 styled as Minister of Industry	John Manley
Pierre H. Vincent	Minister of Consumer and Corporate Affairs; June 25 – November 4, 1993 styled as Minister of Industry	John Manley
Special Cabinet Responsibilities
Predecessor	Title	Successor
position created	Minister responsible for the Federal Office of Regional Development - Quebec; 1993	Paul Martin
24th Canadian Ministry (1984–1993) – Cabinet of Brian Mulroney
Cabinet posts (3)
Predecessor	Office	Successor
Robert de Cotret	Minister of the Environment; 1991–1993	Pierre H. Vincent
Otto Jelinek	Minister of State (Fitness and Amateur Sport); 1988–1990	Marcel Danis as Minister of State (Youth)(Fitness and Amateur Sport)
Andrée Champagne	Minister of State (Youth); 1986–1990	Marcel Danis as Minister of State (Youth)(Fitness and Amateur Sport)
Party political offices
Preceded by Kim Campbell	Leader of the Progressive Conservative Party; 1995–1998; Interim; 1993–1995	Succeeded by Elsie Wayne; Interim
Preceded by Daniel Johnson Jr.	Leader of the Quebec Liberal Party; 1998–2012	Succeeded by Jean-Marc Fournier; Interim
