= AffiliationQuebec =

Defunct political party in Quebec, Canada

- Leader: Allen E. Nutik
- President: Kayvaun Mahbubian
- Founded: January 15, 2008
- Dissolved: January 30, 2012
- Headquarters: 5764 Monkland Ave., Suite 368, Montreal, Quebec, Canada.
- Ideology: Canadian patriotism Electoral reform Environmentalism; Quebec federalism Partition of Quebec; Minority rights
- Political position: Centre
- Colours: Mauve
- Seats in the National Assembly: 0 / 125

Website
- www.affiliationquebec.ca

AffiliationQuebec was a registered political party in Quebec, Canada from 2008 to 2012. It was strongly in favour of Canadian unity and opposed Quebec nationalism and sovereignty. Aside from the party's federalist agenda, its stated mission was to "actively pursue the full rights and interests of staunch Canadians living in the Province of Quebec." It also opposed Quebec's language law. The party never contested any elections. Largely the project of its co-founder and leader, Allen E. Nutik, the party became dormant after his resignation and lost its status as a registered party on January 30, 2012.

== Formation ==
Party leader, Allen E. Nutik, and co-founder, Ardeth Patterson, announced their plan to form the party in May 2007. Nutik described AffiliationQuebec as: "A NEW political party to refocus the agenda! We don't want to be LIED TO, nor undervalued again." Nutik aimed his message primarily but not exclusively at Western Montreal anglophones. Nutik predicted that the party would succeed the defunct Equality Party and aimed to build on voter disappointment with the Quebec Liberal Party and the Action démocratique du Québec, which Nutik said didn't offer any particular consideration to minorities. Although the party's first meeting attracted several dozen people, Nutik was at first unable to collect 100 signatures of supporters, which was the minimum number necessary to officially register the group as an official political party with the Chief Electoral Officer of Quebec. The party was eventually registered on January 15, 2008.

== Activities ==
On March 2, 2008, AffiliationQuebec held a rally, inviting Howard Galganov to speak. At the rally, an AffiliationQuebec supporter wrestled with a member of a small, sovereigntist fringe group protesting the Galganov speech.

When founding the party, Nutik announced his intention to run as a candidate for the next election of the National Assembly of Quebec. Nutik later said that he wanted the party to run candidates in six or seven of the assembly's 125 ridings. In October 2008, with the resignation of Notre-Dame-de-Grace riding Member of the National Assembly Russell Copeman, Nutik declared his intention to contest the seat. However, on November 10, 2008, Nutik announced that neither he nor his party would be running in the Quebec provincial election of 2008, citing lack of resources and support.

== Closure ==
After the election was concluded, Nutik stepped down as party leader, stating that he was "with Mario" (a reference to Mario Dumont, who had recently stepped down as leader of the Action démocratique du Québec). Nutik was not replaced as leader, no further party activities were announced and the party's website was never subsequently updated. The party never submitted an annual report to the Director General of Elections, causing the Director General to announce its intention to withdraw the party's status as an officially registered political party effective January 30, 2012.
