= Calgary Declaration =

The Calgary Declaration (French: Déclaration de Calgary), also known as the Calgary Accord (French: Accord de Calgary), was an agreement made between most premiers of the provinces and territories of Canada regarding how to approach future amendments to the Constitution. It was signed in Calgary, Alberta, on September 14, 1997, by all Canadian premiers and territorial leaders except Quebec's Lucien Bouchard. The Declaration had followed controversial and divisive constitutional debate in Canada seen during the patriation of the Constitution in 1982, and the subsequent collapse of the Meech Lake and Charlottetown Accords.

== Content ==
Both the Meech Lake and Charlottetown Accords, had they been enacted, would have controversially bestowed upon Quebec the status of a "distinct society." The Declaration thus parted from this trend by referring to the "unique character of Quebec society" rather than endorsing the recognition of Quebec as a distinct society. The role of the National Assembly of Quebec in promoting this uniqueness (specified as including the predominant use of the French language, its culture and its civil law) was affirmed.

Notwithstanding the uniqueness of Quebec's characteristics and the characteristics of other provinces, the Declaration stated that all provinces must have legal equality. Moreover, powers gained by any province during future constitutional negotiations would also have to be offered to the other provinces. In the process, Canadian federalism was reaffirmed as the form of Canada's government, and it was stated that this system could operate to ensure Canadians would receive social services, as long as the various levels of government "work in partnership while respecting each other's jurisdictions."

The Declaration also affirmed equality rights (including "equality of opportunity") and recognized Canada's multiculturalism, indeed asserting that Canada's "diversity" and "tolerance" are "without rival in the world." In recognizing Canada's diversity, the Declaration made explicit reference to the "Aboriginal peoples and cultures."

== Reaction ==
According to an opinion poll conducted by Angus Reid in November 1997, 62% of Canadians supported the Declaration's principles (39% "moderately", 23% "strongly"). 30% were opposed and 7% had no opinion. These numbers were similar to Quebec's, which found 23% "strongly" in favour and 36% "moderately" in favour (59% overall), and 30% opposed. Radio-Canada also found that in Quebec, 80% of the province's residents would classify the Declaration as "acceptable"; 18% were opposed.

Quebec Liberal Jean Charest voiced some support for the Calgary Declaration. However, a Parti Québécois minister Guy Chevrette said a referendum should take place before Quebec should adopt the Declaration, and sovereignty should be an option in such a referendum. In 2006, the eventually successful candidate for the leadership of the Liberal Party of Canada Stéphane Dion recalled the Declaration as being unsuccessful. "Few people remember" the Declaration, he writes, and in Quebec the Declaration was quickly dismissed by politicians because it "had no teeth".

Journalist Paul Wells highlighted items he thought were missing from the Declaration, saying, "The Calgary declaration says nothing about health care, good schools, the return of prosperity, the slow rebirth of a thoughtful Canadian foreign policy, or the possibility of sharing good ideas and ennobling projects with fellow citizens who don't speak the same language but who share the same values."
