= Le Québécois =

Political newspaper in Quebec City, Canada

- Type: Five times a year publication
- Format: Tabloid
- Owner(s): Independent
- Editor: Patrick Bourgeois
- Founded: 2001
- Political alignment: Sovereigntism, Social democracy
- Headquarters: 16, de Laval; Quebec City
- Website: lequebecois.org

Le Québécois (French pronunciation: [lə kebəˈkwa]) is a political newspaper based in Quebec City. Founded in 2001, it is a medium of the Quebec sovereignty movement. The newspaper also has a militant wing, the Réseau de Résistance du Québécois.

== Description ==
Originally backed by the Société nationale des Québécois et des Québécoises de la Capitale, Le Québécois is now independent. It notably featured columns from filmmaker, activist and intellectual Pierre Falardeau and the former sovereigntist Premier of Quebec Jacques Parizeau.

It is responsible for the creation of Québec-Radio, the fund-raising beer La Militante and manages the Éditions du Québécois publishing house.

== Controversies ==
It has been featured in two fairly notable controversies. One regarded a harsh and raw critical article by Pierre Falardeau on federalist thinker Claude Ryan, shortly after the latter's death in the February/March 2004 edition.

The second controversy was raised in 2005 by Le Québécois about then future Governor General of Canada Michaëlle Jean and her and husband Jean-Daniel Lafond's ties to the sovereignty movement and the Front de libération du Québec.

== See also ==
- List of sovereigntist media
- List of Quebec media
- Quebec nationalism
- Quebec politics
- Québécois
- List of newspapers in Canada
