= Constitutional debate in Canada =

The Constitutional debate of Canada is an ongoing debate covering various political issues regarding the fundamental law of the country. The debate can be traced back to the Royal Proclamation, issued on October 7, 1763, following the signing of the Treaty of Paris (1763) wherein France ceded most of New France to Great Britain in favour of keeping Guadeloupe.

Since the enactment of the Constitution Act, 1867, which brought the Province of Canada, New Brunswick, and Nova Scotia together as Canada, the debate has focused on these issues:

- The interpretation of the Constitution
- The division of powers between the federal and provincial governments
- The type of federalism to be applied within the federation
- The way the constitution should be amended
- The inclusion of specific civil rights in the constitution

== Historical overview ==
The initial policy of Great Britain with regards to its newly acquired colony of Quebec was revealed in a Royal Proclamation on October 7, 1763. The proclamation renamed Canada "The Province of Quebec", redefined its borders, and established a British appointed colonial government. The new governor of the colony was given the power and direction to summon and call general assemblies of the people's representatives.

== The status quo ==
The current Constitution of Canada consists of the 1867 British North America Act (BNA) and subsequent amendments.

=== Distribution of legislative powers ===
The BNA Act defined the areas of jurisdiction for the provinces and the federal government. There are 29 exclusive federal jurisdictions and 16 provincial jurisdictions. The provincial jurisdictions are listed under sections 92, 93 and 95 of the constitution.

The BNA Act granted the federal parliament all "residuary" powers not already defined as provincial. It also gave the federal government a veto power over provincial legislation. The members of the Senate of Canada, the Supreme Court of Canada, judges and the judges of all of the provinces' highest courts are appointed by the federal executive.

The Constitution Act, 1982, did not change the divisions of responsibilities between the provincial and the federal legislatures, except for the provincial jurisdiction over natural resources and energy, which was clarified and slightly expanded.

=== Charter of rights and freedoms ===
The Canadian Charter of Rights and Freedoms was enshrined into the constitution of Canada in 1982. The charter covers fundamental liberties, democratic rights, mobility rights, legal rights, equality rights, language rights and minority language education rights.

=== Amendment process ===
The 1982 constitutional reform introduced an amendment process that no longer involved the approval of the Parliament of the United Kingdom. The amendment formula is described in section 37 to 49 of the constitution. In general, amendments can be passed by the House of Commons, the Senate, and a two-thirds majority of the provincial legislatures (7 of the 10) representing at least 50% of the Canadian population (the 7/50 formula). Certain types of amendments use other amending formulas.

== Debated areas ==
=== Interpretation of the British North America Act ===
==== Foundation of the nation ====
In Canada West (Ontario), the confederation process was promoted as the act of foundation of a new British nation. The project generally received wide support in the press and in the political class. It is primarily the politicians of Canada West that, with the Great Coalition, orchestrated the process which led to the legislative union of the British North American colonies.

The anti-Confederation movement was however quite strong in one of the two Maritime provinces that were initially federated by the BNAA. The Liberal politicians of the Maritime provinces did not support the movement of the Great Coalition before or after the fact.

In Nova Scotia, 36 out of 38 seats of the provincial legislature and 18 out of 19 seats of the new federal legislature went to anti-Confederation candidates at the first election. Premier William Annand and federal MP Joseph Howe pushed for the removal of Nova Scotia from the new Dominion. Howe eventually accepted a position in the federal government of McDonald, while Annand kept fighting Confederation up until 1869.

The movement died shortly after when the idea of reversing the process of confederation was abandoned. The point of view that the confederation is the act of foundation of the Canadian nation was and still is today the policy of the federal government.

==== Pact between two founding peoples ====
In Canada East (Quebec), the confederation project was promoted by the Parti bleu and opposed by the Parti rouge. George-Étienne Cartier supported and promoted the project as a way to regain the political autonomy that Lower Canada had lost with the forced Union of 1840. Reluctant at first, the Catholic clergy eventually supported confederation when it became known that education and "health" were going to be exclusive provincial jurisdictions.

After 1867 and up until the 1960s, the idea that the BNAA was a legal document containing guarantees to the equality of the two founding peoples was taken for granted by most members of the intellectual elite of French Canada. Nationalist politicians from Quebec (sometimes Liberal, sometimes Conservative) were elected on programs which stated how they were to defend the constitutional guarantees granted by Great Britain to French Canadians in order to protect their nationality. Federal politicians, such as Henri Bourassa, advocated more autonomy for Canada within the British Empire, while provincial politicians such as Honoré Mercier defended the autonomy of the province of Quebec within the Canadian Dominion.

==== Just another British Act ====
The Parti rouge of Canada East opposed the confederation process, just as its ancestor party, the Parti patriote, had opposed the Union process. Some rouges such as Antoine-Aimé Dorion, demanded that the project be submitted to a direct vote by the people, convinced it would be rejected. The process which led to the confederation was considered illegitimate because in their opinion it was undemocratic.

Other liberals suggested a highly decentralized confederation that would have given only certain limited powers to the union government. The party lead the anti-confederation campaign and at the first provincial elections, 13 out of 65 anti-confederation candidates were elected, obtaining 45% of the recorded votes.

Much later, in the late 1950s, the opinions of the Parti rouge would be supported by the first advocates of the independence of Quebec.

=== Nature of Canadian federalism ===
==== Confederation / federation ====
Since the creation of the federal state, the role of this new level of government has been the object of debate. As of 1867, some politicians have seen the federal government as the central, national government of Canada whereas others have seen it as a confederal government, the creation of the provinces, responsible for administering things the latter had in common.

==== Symmetrical and asymmetrical federalism ====
Symmetrical federalism refers to a political organization where all federated states have equal status and autonomy within the greater ensemble.

Asymmetrical federalism refers to a political organization where the federated states have variable levels of autonomy within the greater ensemble.

==== Binationalism, bilingualism and biculturalism ====
Mostly supported by French Canadians, the binational confederation was seen as a way for French Canadians and British Canadians to coexist within the same country and share common institutions. Since French Canadians viewed themselves as a distinct nation and wished for this nation to keep existing, many political leaders from Quebec promoted the official recognition of the French language by the federal government and all provincial governments. This view is today associated with the pre-Quiet Revolution era.

==== Multicultural nation state ====
Promoted by the Liberals during Pierre E. Trudeau's prime ministership, this view of Canada is at once readily embraced by a great number of Canadians and is enshrined in Section Twenty-seven of the Canadian Charter of Rights and Freedoms. It is, however, seen as unacceptable because it is insufficient by essentially all Quebec provincial politicians. To them, the multicultural nation state model alone fails at recognizing the national character of Quebec society and the consequences of this for the Quebec state as a member state of the Canadian federation.

The concept of a pluralistic society is generally perceived positively in Quebec, which is also a land open to immigration. However, Quebec policies speak of civic "interculturalism" rather than multiculturalism, which is associated with ghettoization. The Canadian multiculturalism policy is often perceived negatively, for it depicts the French-speaking majority of Quebec as one of the many ethnic groups of Canada, therefore denying the national character of Quebec, and undermining the efforts of the Quebec state to integrate immigrants into its mainstream French-speaking society. Debates over issues of cultural pluralism such as reasonable accommodations for religious observance in public spaces have been prominent in Quebec politics and society in the 21st century, as in the Bouchard-Taylor Commission of 2007-08, the Quebec Charter of Values proposed in 2013 but abandoned in 2014, and the Act respecting the laicity of the State which became law in 2019.

==== Multinational state ====
Many politicians and public figures think that Canada would move forward in the recognition of its own diversity by declaring itself a de jure multinational state. With regards to Quebec, this view would be more in line with the "nation within the nation" of former Prime Minister Lester B. Pearson in the pre-Trudeau era.

==== One nation, one country ====
Many Canadians outside Quebec think of Canada as a monolithic nation with 10 equal provinces. Since they see only one nation in the country, they are opposed to any kind of asymmetrical relation with Quebec or any other province. Believing that Canada needs a strong federal government to defend and promote national unity, some are by principle reluctant to decentralization of powers to the provinces. Others accept broad provincial powers so long as those given to Quebec are no different from those given to the other provinces (essentially the position of the Reform Party during the Meech Lake debate, as described in Preston Manning's 1992 book The New Canada.

==== Two nations, two countries ====
With secession, many Quebec nationalists think they have the answer to Canada's continual constitutional debate. Marginalized after the Patriotes rebellion of 1837–38, the secessionist option was resurrected as a credible solution in the wake of the 1960s Quiet Revolution of Quebec. Some politicians see independence as the normal conclusion of the Quebec struggle for the conservation of its autonomy within the Canadian federal framework. Some see it in a broader perspective of every people's right to self-determination and what they see as the normal evolution of a 400-year-old former French colony that fell victim to the colonial wars between Great Britain and France.

==== Treaty federalism ====
The doctrine of treaty federalism states that Canada consists of two unions, one of ten provinces and the federal government, and the other of the Crown with the Aboriginal peoples of Canada. Under this doctrine, The First Nations, Inuit, and Métis are thought of as sovereign nations who are in a compact with Canada, rather than minority groups within the Canadian nation-state.

The report of the Royal Commission on Aboriginal Peoples (1996) stated that

the terms of Canadian federation are found not only in formal constitutional documents governing relations between federal and provincial governments but also in treaties and other instruments establishing the basic links between Aboriginal peoples and the Crown

== Positions ==
=== Maintain status quo ===
The official position of the federal government of Canada, an overwhelming majority of Canadians outside Quebec and a minority of people (20%) inside Quebec. The Liberal Party of Canada is the main actor behind the efforts to maintain the constitutional status quo.

=== Constitutional reforms ===
Position of many federalists from English-speaking Canada and Quebec. Seen as the only way to avoid the secession of Quebec. Since the rise of the sovereignty movement, this option seems to gather a solid 40% of support among Quebec voters. Efforts to reform the Canadian constitution in order to recognize Quebec's specificity (or distinct society) and provide a means to accommodate its need for greater autonomy have resulted in the Meech Lake Accord which collapsed before it came into effect and the Charlottetown Accord which was rejected by a majority of Canadians and also a majority of Quebecers in referendum in 1995. The option is still supported, with more or less energy, by the Liberal Party of Quebec.

=== Independence of Quebec ===
This is the position of the Quebec sovereigntists. Seen as the best or only way to ensure the normal development of the Quebec society from a cultural, economic and social point of view. Since the 1980s, this option seems to gather, from one survey to the next a solid 40% of support among Quebec voters. In 1980, the Quebec government held a referendum on sovereignty-association, which was rejected by 60% of the Quebec electorate, and a second one on sovereignty with an optional partnership, which was rejected by 50.6% of the same electorate. The option is presently supported by the Parti Québécois and Québec solidaire, both provincial parties in Quebec. Secession is not considered an option by federal-level parties other than the Bloc Québécois and essentially all the population of the English-speaking provinces.

== See also ==
- Politics of Canada
- Politics of Quebec
- Republicanism in Canada
- List of documents from the constitutional history of Canada
- Unsuccessful attempts to amend the Canadian Constitution
