= Marcel Beaudry =

Canadian lawyer, politician and public official

Marcel Beaudry (November 17, 1933 – November 24, 2012) was a lawyer, politician and public official. He served as mayor of Hull, Quebec (now part of Gatineau) in 1991 and 1992 and as chair of the National Capital Commission from 1992 to 2006.

The son of Léon Beaudry and Rosia Farley, he served as chief crown attorney in Hull from 1960 to 1966. Beaudry was solicitor for the city of Hull and for the Société de transport de l'Outaouais during the 1970s and 1980s.

Beaudry was elected mayor of Hull in 1991 and had served nine months when he was named to the National Capital Commission (NCC) by Prime Minister Brian Mulroney. He continued to serve in that position under Prime Ministers Kim Campbell, Jean Chrétien (who appointed him to a second term), Paul Martin and Stephen Harper. He retired from the NCC at the end of his second 7-year term. Major projects during his time at the head of the NCC included renovations on the Champlain Bridge and construction of the Canadian War Museum. He is also crediting with making the operations of the NCC more transparent to the public. The redevelopment of the LeBreton Flats area of Ottawa was initiated during Beaudry's time as NCC chair.

The commission also oversaw the construction of the new Embassy of the United States of America on Sussex Drive in Downtown Ottawa. Beaudry maneuvered the commission through the controversy surrounding the location of the embassy which was inaugurated by President Clinton in early October 1999.

Beaudry also served as a member of the Commission on the Political and Constitutional Future of Quebec, also known as the Bélanger-Campeau Commission.

Beaudry was married to Mona Rivest (January 16, 1934 - September 11, 2006). Together they had four children: Jean-Luc, Anne, Charles and François.

The Beaudry's were well-known and avid fine art collectors.

Marcel Beaudry died of cancer at the age of 79 in a Montreal hospital.
