= Jacques Proulx =

Canadian trade unionist (1939–2026)

- Born: 28 April 1939; Saint-Camille, Quebec, Canada
- Died: 9 October 2026 (aged 87)
- Occupation: Trade unionist

Jacques Proulx (28 April 1939 – 9 October 2026) was a Canadian trade unionist.

Proulx served as president of the Syndicat des producteurs agricoles de l'Estrie from 1976 to 1981 and of the Union des producteurs agricoles from 1981 to 1993. Lastly, he served as president of the Solidarité rurale du Québec from 1993 to 2008.

Proulx died on 9 October 2026, at the age of 87.

== Distinctions ==
- Commander of the Ordre national du Mérite agricole (1990)
- Knight of the National Order of Quebec (1995)
