= Autonomism in Quebec =

Position for greater autonomy within Canada

In Quebec politics, autonomism is a stance on the national question which supports devolving greater powers to Quebec while remaining a Canadian province, often through asymmetric federalism. It is a middle position between independence and federalism. Autonomism was first proposed by Maurice Duplessis; it is mostly supported by conservative political parties, including Coalition Avenir Québec, which was the ruling party of Quebec from 2018 to 2026.

Drawing inspiration from René Lévesque's "beau risque", and Robert Bourassa's work on the Meech Lake Accord and Charlottetown Accord, Quebec autonomists propose:

- Setting out the procedures for constitutional change
- A sharing of jurisdictions between the federal government and Quebec
- Framework for federal spending powers
- Institutional reform
- Reform of intergovernmental policies

In a speech to delegates of the Action démocratique du Québec on 8 May 2006, party leader Mario Dumont said that Quebec should seek to re-open negotiations with the federal government over Quebec's status in Confederation, and should eventually ratify the Constitution of Canada.

In 2022, Coalition Avenir Québec (CAQ) premier of Quebec, François Legault raised the idea of having referendum on getting more immigration powers from federal government. In 2024, Legault repeated his calls on Quebec might hold a referendum on immigration powers if Prime Minister Justin Trudeau did not give the province more immigration powers. In the 2026 Quebec general election, the CAQ faced an electoral wipeout and lost control of government.

== See also ==
- Politics of Quebec
- Quebec federalist ideology
- Quebec sovereignty movement
