= Politics of Quebec =

- Coat of arms of Quebec
- Polity type: Province within a federal parliamentary constitutional monarchy
- Constitution: Constitution of Canada

Legislative branch
- Name: Parliament: National Assembly
- Type: Unicameral
- Meeting place: Parliament Building, Quebec City
- Presiding officer: President of the National Assembly

Executive branch
- Head of state
- Currently: King Charles III represented by Manon Jeannotte, Lieutenant Governor
- Head of government
- Currently: Premier; Christine Fréchette
- Appointer: Lieutenant Governor
- Cabinet
- Name: Executive Council
- Leader: Premier (as President of the Executive Council)
- Appointer: Lieutenant Governor
- Headquarters: Quebec City

Judicial branch
- Court of Appeal
- Chief judge: Manon Savard
- Seat: Quebec City

The politics of Quebec are centred on a provincial government resembling that of the other Canadian provinces, namely a constitutional monarchy and parliamentary democracy. The capital of Quebec is Quebec City, where the Lieutenant Governor, Premier, the legislature, and cabinet reside.

The legislature — the Parliament of Quebec — is unicameral, consisting of the Lieutenant Governor and the National Assembly, which has 125 members. Government is conducted based on the Westminster model.

== Political system ==
Organization of powers in Québec

The British-type parliamentarism based on the Westminster system was introduced in the province of Lower Canada in 1791. The diagram at right represents the political system of Québec since the 1968 reform. Prior to this reform, the Parliament of Québec was bicameral.

Lieutenant Governor

- asks the leader of the majority party to form a government in which he will serve as Premier
- enacts the laws adopted by the National Assembly
- has the power to veto.

Premier

- appoints the members of the Cabinet and the heads of public corporations
- determines the date of the coming general elections

Members of the National Assembly (MNAs)

- are elected using the first-past-the-post voting system
- there are 125 Members of the National Assembly, so approximately one MNA for each 45,000 electors.

== Institutions ==
Many of Quebec's political institutions are among the oldest in North America. The first part of this article presents the main political institutions of Quebec society. The last part presents Québec's current politics and issues.

Parliament

The Parliament of Québec holds the legislative power. It consists of the National Assembly of Québec and the Lieutenant Governor of Quebec.

Lieutenant Governor

While the powers of the Crown are vested in the monarch, they are exercised by the lieutenant governor, his personal representative, typically on the binding advice of the premier and Executive Council.

In Canada, lieutenant governor is appointed by the governor general, on the advice of the prime minister of Canada.Thus, it is typically the lieutenant governor whom the premier and ministers advise, in exercising much of the royal prerogative.

While the advice of the premier and Executive Council is typically binding on the lieutenant governor, there are occasions when the lieutenant governor has refused advice. This usually occurs if the premier does not clearly command the confidence of the elected National Assembly.

The lieutenant governor is tasked with a number of governmental duties. Not among them, though, is delivering the Throne Speech, which sets the lieutenant governor of Quebec apart from the other Canadian viceroys. (Instead, new sessions begin with the Opening Speech by the premier.) The lieutenant governor is also expected to undertake various ceremonial roles. For instance, upon installation, the lieutenant governor automatically becomes a Knight or Dame of Justice and the Vice-Prior in Quebec of the Most Venerable Order of the Hospital of Saint John of Jerusalem. The lieutenant governor presents numerous other provincial honours and decorations and various awards that are named for and presented by the lieutenant governor, which were reinstated in 2000 by Lieutenant Governor Lise Thibault. These honours are presented at official ceremonies, which count among hundreds of other engagements the lieutenant governor takes part in each year, either as host or guest of honour; in 2006, the lieutenant governor of Quebec undertook 400 engagements and 200 in 2007.

National Assembly

The National Assembly is part of a legislature based on the Westminster System. However, it has a few special characteristics, one of the most important being that it functions primarily in French, although French and English are Constitutionally official and the Assembly's records are published in both languages. The representatives of the Québec people are elected with the first-past-the-post electoral method. Never varying from first-past-the-post, of all the provinces of Canada, Quebec is the only province that since 1867 has not ever used a multi-seat district.

The government is constituted by the majority party and it is responsible to the National Assembly. Since the abolition of the Legislative Council at the end of 1968, the National Assembly has all the powers to enact laws in the provincial jurisdiction as specified in the Constitution of Canada.

Government

The government of Quebec consists of all the ministries and governmental branches that do not have the status of independent institutions, such as municipalities and regional county municipalities.

Executive Council

The Executive Council is the body responsible for decision-making in the government. It is composed of the Lieutenant Governor (known as the Governor-in-Council), the Premier (in French Premier ministre), the government ministers, the ministers of state and delegate ministers. The Executive Council directs the government and the civil service, and oversees the enforcement of laws, regulations and policies. Together with the Lieutenant Governor, it constitutes the government of Québec. See also Premier of Québec.

=== Other institutions ===
Quebec Ombudsman

The Quebec Ombudsman is a legislative officer responsible for handling complaints from individuals, companies and associations who believe the government of Quebec or any of its branches has made an error or treated them unjustly. The Ombudsman has certain powers defined by the Public Protector Act. The Québec Ombudsman has a social contract with Québécois to ensure the transparency of the state.

Human Rights and Youth Rights Commission

The Commission des droits de la personne et des droits de la jeunesse (Human Rights and Youth Rights Commission) is a publicly funded agency created by the Charter of Human Rights and Freedoms. Its members are appointed by the National Assembly. The commission has been given powers to promote and protect human rights within all sectors of Québec society. Government institutions and Parliament are bound by the provisions of the Charter. The commission may investigate into possible cases of discrimination, whether by the State or by private parties. It may introduce litigation if its recommendations were not followed.

Québec Office of the French language

The Office Québécois de la Langue Française (Quebec Office of the French language) is an organization created in 1961. Its mandate was greatly expanded by the 1977 Charter of the French Language. It is responsible for applying and defining Québec's language policy pertaining to linguistic officialization, terminology and francization of public administration and businesses.

See language policies for a comparison with other jurisdictions in the world.

Council on the Status of Women

Established in 1963, the Conseil du statut de la femme (Council on the Status of Women) is a government advisory and study council responsible for informing the government of the status of women's rights in Québec. The council is made of a chair and 10 members appointed by the Québec government every four to five years. The head office of the council is in Québec City and it has 11 regional offices throughout Québec.

Quebec Commission on Access to Information

A first in North America, the Commission d'accès à l'information du Québec (Quebec Commission on Access to Information, CAI) is an institution created in 1982 to administer the Quebec legislative framework of access to information and protection of privacy.

The first law related to privacy protection is the Consumer Protection Act, enacted in 1971. It ensured that all persons had the right to access their credit record. A little later, the Professional Code enshrined principles such as professional secrecy and the confidential nature of personal information.

Today, the CAI administers the law framework of the Act respecting access to documents held by public bodies and the protection of personal information as well as the Act respecting the protection of personal information in the private sector.

Chief electoral officer of Québec

Independent from the government, this institution is responsible for the administration of the Québec electoral system.

=== Judiciary ===
The principal judicial courts of Québec are the Court of Quebec, the Superior Court and the Court of Appeal. The judges of the first are appointed by the Government of Quebec, while the judges of the two others are appointed by the Government of Canada.

In 1973, the Tribunal des professions was created to behave as an appeal tribunal to decisions taken by the various discipline committees of Quebec's professional orders. The current president is Paule Lafontaine.

On December 10, 1990, the Human Rights Tribunal of Quebec was created. It became the first judicial tribunal in Canada specializing in human rights. The current president is Michèle Rivet.

An administrative tribunal, the Tribunal administratif du Québec is in operation since April 1, 1998, to resolve disputes between citizens and the government. The current president is Jacques Forgues.

=== Municipal and regional institutions ===
The territory of Quebec is divided into 17 administrative regions: Bas-Saint-Laurent, Saguenay-Lac-Saint-Jean, Capitale-Nationale, Mauricie, Estrie, Montreal, Outaouais, Abitibi-Témiscamingue, Côte-Nord, Nord-du-Québec, Gaspésie-Îles-de-la-Madeleine, Chaudière-Appalaches, Laval, Lanaudière, Laurentides, Montérégie, and Centre-du-Québec.

Inside the regions, there are municipalities and regional county municipalities (RCMs).

School boards

On July 1, 1998, 69 linguistic school boards, 60 Francophone and 9 Anglophone, were created in replacement for the former 153 Catholic and Protestant boards. In order to pass this law, which ended a debate of over 30 years, it was necessary for the Parliament of Canada to amend Article 93 of the Constitution Act 1867. They were reformed under the CAQ government.

== Political history ==
When Quebec became one of the four founding provinces of the Canadian Confederation, guarantees for the maintenance of its language and religion under the Quebec Act of 1774 formed part of the British North America Act, 1867. English and French were made the official languages in Quebec Courts and the provincial legislature. The Quebec school system was provided public funding for a dual system based on the Roman Catholic and Protestant religions. Under the Constitution Act, 1867 the provinces were granted control of education. The religious-based separate school systems continued in Quebec until the 1990s when the Parti Québécois government of Lucien Bouchard requested an amendment under provisions of the Constitution Act, 1982 to formally secularize the school system along linguistic lines.

=== Union Nationale era ===
Premier Maurice Duplessis and his Union Nationale party emerged from the ashes of the Conservative Party of Quebec and the Paul Gouin's Action libérale nationale in the 1930s. This political lineage dates back to the 1850s Parti bleu of Louis-Hippolyte Lafontaine, a centre-right party in Quebec that emphasized provincial autonomy and allied itself with Conservatives in English Canada. Under his government, the Roman Catholic and Protestant Churches maintained the control they previously gained over social services such as schools and hospitals. The authoritarian Duplessis used the provincial police and the "Padlock Law" to suppress unionism and gave the Montreal-based Anglo-Scot business elite, as well as British and American capital a free rein in running the Quebec economy. His government also continued to attempt to prevent circulation of books banned by the Catholic Church, combated communism and even tried to shut down other Christian religions like the Jehovah's Witnesses who evangelized in French Canada. The clergy used its influence to exhort Catholic voters to continue electing with the Union Nationale and threaten to excommunicate sympathisers of liberal ideas. For the time it lasted, the Duplessis regime resisted the North American and European trend of massive State investment in education, health, and social programs, turning away federal transfers of funds earmarked for these fields; he jealously guarded provincial jurisdictions. Common parlance speaks of these years as "La Grande Noirceur" The Great Darkness, as in the first scenes of the film Maurice Richard.

=== Quiet Revolution ===
In 1960, under a new Liberal Party government led by Premier Jean Lesage, the political power of the church was greatly reduced. Quebec entered an accelerated decade of changes known as the Quiet Revolution. Liberal governments of the 1960s followed a robust nationalist policy of "maîtres chez nous" ("masters in our own home") that would see French-speaking Quebecers use the state to elevate their economic status and assert their cultural identity. The government took control of the education system, nationalized power production and distribution into Hydro-Québec (the provincial power utility), unionized the civil service, founded the Caisse de Depot to manage the massive new government pension program, and invested in companies that promoted French Canadians to management positions in industry. In 1966, the Union Nationale returned to power despite losing the popular vote by nearly seven points to the Liberal Party, but could not turn the tide of modernization and secularization that the Quiet Revolution had started. Both Liberal and Union Nationale governments continued to oppose federal intrusion into provincial jurisdiction.

=== Quebec independence movement ===
A non-violent Quebec independence movement slowly took form in the late 1960s. The Parti Québécois was created by the sovereignty-association movement of René Lévesque; it advocated recognizing Quebec as an equal and independent (or "sovereign") nation that would form an economic "association" with the rest of Canada. An architect of the Quiet Revolution, Lévesque was frustrated by federal-provincial bickering over what he saw as increasing federal government intrusions into provincial jurisdictions. He saw a formal break with Canada as a way out of this. He broke with the provincial Liberals who remained committed to the policy of defending provincial autonomy inside Canada.

In reaction to events in Quebec and formal demands of the Lesage government, Lester Pearson's ruling Liberal government in Ottawa sought to address the new political assertiveness of Quebec. He commissioned the Royal Commission on Bilingualism and Biculturalism in 1963. Pearson also recruited Pierre Trudeau, who campaigned against the violation of civil liberties under Duplessis and the economic and political marginalization of French Quebecers in the 1950s. Trudeau saw official bilingualism in Canada as the best way of remedying this.

In 1968, Trudeau was elected Prime Minister on a wave of "Trudeaumania". In 1969, his government instituted Official Bilingualism with the Official Languages Act which made French and English official languages and guaranteed linguistic minorities (English-speaking in Quebec, French-speaking elsewhere) the right to federal services in their language of choice, where the number justifies federal spending. He also implemented the policy of multiculturalism, answering the concern of immigrant communities that their cultural identities were being ignored. In 1971, Trudeau also failed in an attempt to bring home the Canadian Constitution from Great Britain at the Victoria conference when Robert Bourassa refused to accept a deal that would not include a Constitutional veto on federal institutions for Quebec.

Trudeau's vision was to create a Constitution for a "Just Society" with a strong federal government founded on shared values of individual rights, bilingualism, social democratic ideals, and, later on, multiculturalism. As Liberal Justice Minister in 1967, he eliminated Canada's sodomy law stating "The state has no business in the bedrooms of the nation"; he also created the first Divorce Act of Canada. This government also repealed Canada's race-based immigration law.

During the 1960s, a violent terrorist group known as the Front de libération du Québec (FLQ) was formed in an effort to attain Quebec independence. In October 1970, their activities culminated in events referred to as the October Crisis when the British Trade commissioner James Cross was kidnapped along with Pierre Laporte, a provincial minister and Vice-Premier, who was killed a few days later. Quebec Premier Robert Bourassa called for military assistance to guard government officials. Prime Minister Trudeau responded by declaring the War Measures Act to stop what was described as an "Apprehended Insurrection" by the FLQ. Critics charge that Trudeau violated civil liberties by arresting thousands of political activists without a warrant as allowed by the Act. Supporters of these measures point to their popularity at the time and the fact that the FLQ was wiped out. Independence-minded Quebecers would now opt for the social democratic nationalism of the Parti Québécois.

Broad-based dissatisfaction by both English and French-speaking Quebecers with the government of Robert Bourassa saw Parti Québécois led by René Lévesque win the Quebec provincial election in 1976. The first PQ government was known as the "republic of professors", for its high number of candidates teaching at the university level. The PQ government passed laws limiting financing of political parties and the Charter of the French Language (Bill 101). The Charter established French as the sole official language of Quebec. The government claimed the Charter was needed to preserve the French language in an overwhelmingly anglophone North American continent.

The enactment of Bill 101 was highly controversial and led to an immediate and sustained exodus of anglophones from Quebec that, according to Statistics Canada (2003), since 1971 saw a drop of 599,000 of those Quebecers whose mother tongue was English. This exodus of English speakers provided a substantial and permanent boost to the population of the city of Toronto, Ontario. This Quebec diaspora occurred for a number of reasons including regulations that made French the only language of communication allowed between employers and their employees. Under pain of financial penalties, all businesses in Quebec having more than fifty employees were required to obtain a certificate of francization [Reg.139-140] and those businesses with over one hundred employees were obliged to establish a Committee of francization [Reg.136] As well, the language law placed restrictions on school enrollment for children based on parental language of education and banned outdoor commercial signs displaying languages other than French. The section of the law regarding language on signs was deemed unconstitutional by the Supreme Court of Canada under the Canadian Charter of Rights and Freedoms, see: Ford v Quebec (AG). The revised law of 1988 adheres to the Supreme Court judgment, specifying that signs can be multilingual so long as French is predominant. The maintenance of an inspectorate to enforce the sign laws remains controversial. However, most Quebeckers adhere to the sign laws, as remembrance of what Montreal looked like (an English city for a French majority) before the sign laws is still vivid.

In the 1980 Quebec referendum, Premier René Lévesque asked the Quebec people for "a mandate to negotiate" his proposal for "sovereignty-association" with the federal government. The Referendum promised that a subsequent deal would be ratified with a second referendum. Prime Minister Pierre Trudeau would campaign against it, promising a renewed federalism based on a new Canadian Constitution. Sixty per cent of the Quebec electorate voted against the sovereignty-association project. After opening a final round of constitutional talks, the Trudeau government patriated the constitution in 1982 without the approval of the Quebec government, which sought to retain a veto on constitutional amendments along with other special legal recognition within Canada. The new constitution featured a modern Canadian Charter of Rights and Freedoms based on individual freedoms that would ban racial, sexual, and linguistic discrimination and enshrine minority language rights (English in Quebec, French elsewhere in Canada). After dominating Quebec politics for more than a decade, both Lévesque and Trudeau would then retire from politics shortly in the early 1980s.

From 1985 to 1994, the federalist provincial Liberal Party governed Quebec under Robert Bourassa. The Progressive Conservatives replaced the Liberals federally in 1984 and governed until 1993. Progressive Conservative Prime Minister Brian Mulroney brought together all provincial premiers, including Robert Bourassa, to get the Quebec government's signature on the constitution. The Meech Lake Accord in 1987 recognized Quebec as a "distinct society". The Mulroney government also transferred considerable power over immigration and taxation to Quebec.

The Accord faced stiff opposition from a number of quarters. In Quebec and across Canada, some objected to it arguing that "distinct society" provisions were unclear and could lead to attempts at a gradual independence for Quebec from Canada, and compromising the Charter of Rights. The Parti Québécois, by then led by sovereigntist Jacques Parizeau, opposed the Meech Lake agreement because it did not grant Quebec enough autonomy. The Reform Party in Western Canada led by Preston Manning said that the Accord compromised principles of provincial equality, and ignored the grievances of the Western provinces. Aboriginal groups demanded "distinct society" status similar to Quebec's.

The Accord collapsed in 1990 when Liberal governments came to power in Manitoba and Newfoundland, and did not ratify the agreement. Prime Minister Mulroney, Premier Bourassa, and the other provincial premiers negotiated another constitutional deal, the Charlottetown Accord. It weakened Meech provisions on Quebec and sought to resolve the concerns of the West, and was soundly rejected by a country-wide referendum in 1992.

The collapse of the Meech Lake Accord reshaped the entire Canadian political landscape. Lucien Bouchard, a Progressive Conservative Cabinet Minister who felt humiliated by the defeat of the Meech Lake Accord, led other Quebec Progressive Conservatives and Liberals out of their parties to form the sovereigntist Bloc Québécois. Mario Dumont, leader of the Quebec Liberal Party's youth wing left Bourassa's party to form a "soft nationalist" and sovereigntist Action démocratique du Québec party. The Progressive Conservative Party collapsed in the 1993 election, with Western conservatives voting Reform, Quebec conservatives voting for the Bloc Québécois, and Ontario and Western Montreal voters putting the Liberal Party led by Jean Chrétien into power. Jean Charest in Sherbrooke, Quebec, was one of two Progressive Conservatives left in Parliament, and became party leader.

The Parti Québécois won the 1994 provincial election under the leadership of Jacques Parizeau amid continued anger over the rejection of the Meech Lake Accord. The Parizeau government quickly held a referendum on sovereignty in 1995. Premier Parizeau favoured a unilateral declaration of independence (UDI) followed by negotiations with the federal government if sovereignty were endorsed in the referendum. Lucien Bouchard and Dumont insisted that negotiations with the federal government should come before a declaration of independence. They compromised with an agreement to work together followed by a referendum question that would propose resorting to a UDI by the National Assembly only if negotiations to negotiate a new political "partnership" under Lucien Bouchard failed to produce results after one year.

The sovereigntist campaign remained moribund under Parizeau. It was only with a few weeks to go in the campaign that support for sovereignty skyrocketed to above 50%. On October 30, 1995, the partnership proposal was rejected by an extremely slim margin of less than one per cent.

Parizeau resigned and was replaced by Bouchard. The sovereigntist option was pushed aside until they could establish "winning conditions". Bouchard was suspected by hard-line sovereigntists as having a weak commitment to Quebec independence. Bouchard, in turn, was ill at ease with the ardent nationalism of some elements in the Parti Québécois. He eventually resigned over alleged instances of anti-Semitism within the hard-line wing of the party and was replaced by Bernard Landry. Tensions between the left wing of the party and the relatively fiscal conservative party executive under Bouchard and Landry also led to the formation of the Union des forces progressistes, another social-democratic sovereigntist party that later merged with other left-wing groups to form Québec solidaire.

Mario Dumont and the Action démocratique du Québec put the sovereigntist option aside entirely and ran on a fiscally conservative agenda. They won three consecutive byelections, and their popularity soared fleetingly in opinion polls shortly before the 2003 provincial election, in which they won only four seats and 18% of the popular vote.

The federal Liberal Party Prime Minister Jean Chrétien came under sharp criticism for mishandling the "No" side of the referendum campaign. He launched a hard-line "Plan B" campaign by bringing in Montreal constitutional expert Stéphane Dion, who would attack the perceived ambiguity of the referendum question through a Supreme Court reference on the unilateral secession of Quebec in 1998 and draft the Clarity Act in 2000 to establish strict criteria for accepting a referendum result for sovereignty and a tough negotiating position in the event of a Quebec secession bid.

Jean Charest was lauded by federalists for his impassioned and articulate defense of Canada during the referendum. He left the Progressive Conservative Party to lead the provincial Liberals (no legal relation to its federal counterpart) and a "No" campaign in the event of another referendum, and led his new party to an election victory in 2003. He was re-elected as provincial Premier in the election of 2007, and again in 2008, after having called a snap election. He would be defeated by the PQ's Pauline Marois, Quebec's first female Premier, in 2012.

=== Recent history ===
Prior to the 2018 election, the political status of Quebec within Canada used to remain a central question. This desire for greater provincial autonomy has often been expressed during the annual constitutional meetings of provincial premiers with the Prime Minister of Canada. In Quebec, no single option regarding autonomy currently gathers a majority of support. Therefore, the question remains unresolved after almost 50 years of debate.

In 2018 election, the Coalition Avenir Québec, a Quebec Autonomist Party, won the majority of seats, the first time since 1966 that neither the Parti Québécois (which also lost its official party status for the first time but however to regain months later) nor the Quebec Liberals won a majority. Québec Solidaire also gained a few seats from the Parti Québécois collapse and a couple from the Quebec Liberals. This also ended the interest of Quebec independence from Canada for a while, as seemingly half of Quebecers preferred returning to the idea of receiving more political autonomy within Canada.

In the 2022 Quebec general election, the ruling party, Coalition Avenir Québec (CAQ), secured 90 seats out of 125. The CAQ would become increasingly unpopular from 2023 onwards, with premier François Legault announcing his resignation in January 2026. Christine Fréchette would succeed him as premier, becoming the second woman to hold the role. In the 2026 election, the CAQ faced an electoral wipeout, with the PQ under Paul St-Pierre Plamondon forming a minority government. In addition, the Conservative Party of Quebec entered the National Assembly with elected MNAs for the first time since 1935, placing third.

=== Voting patterns ===
Voting patterns break down as follows:

- 2026 Quebec general election – Sovereigntists 40.45%, Federalists 44.89%, Autonomist/Others 13.35%
- 2022 Quebec general election – Sovereigntists 30.04%, Federalists 27.28%, Autonomist/Others 40.98%
- 2018 Quebec general election – Sovereigntists 33.16%, Federalists 27.96%, Autonomist/Others 37.42%
- 2014 Quebec general election – Sovereigntists 33.01%, Federalists 41.52%, Autonomist/Others 23.05%
- 2012 Quebec general election – Sovereigntists 39.87%, Federalists 31.20%, Autonomist/Others 27.05%
- 2008 Quebec general election – Sovereigntists 38.95%, Federalists 44.25%, Autonomist/Others 16.37%
- 2007 Quebec general election – Sovereigntists 31.99%, Federalists 36.93%, Autonomist/Others 30.84%
- 2003 Quebec general election – Sovereigntists 33.24%, Federalists 45.99%, Autonomist/Others 19.24%
- 1998 Quebec general election – Sovereigntists 42.87%, Federalists 43.55%, Autonomist/Others 11.81%
- 1994 Quebec general election – Sovereigntists 44.75%, Federalists 44.40%, Autonomist/Others 6.46%
- 1989 Quebec general election – Sovereigntists 40.16%, Federalists 53.64%, Autonomist/Others 3.21%
- 1985 Quebec general election – Sovereigntists 38.69%, Federalists 55.99%, Autonomist/Others 3.45%
- 1981 Quebec general election – Sovereigntists 49.26%, Federalists 46.07%, Autonomist/Others 4.00%
- 1976 Quebec general election – Sovereigntists 41.37%, Federalists 33.78%, Autonomist/Others 22.83%
- 1973 Quebec general election – Sovereigntists 30.22%, Federalists 54.65%, Autonomist/Others 14.84%
- 1970 Quebec general election – Sovereigntists 23.06%, Federalists 45.40%, Autonomist/Others 30.84%
- 1966 Quebec general election – Sovereigntists 8.76%, Federalists 47.29%, Autonomist/Others 43.95%
- 1962 Quebec general election – Sovereigntists 1.45%, Federalists 56.40%, Autonomist/Others 42.15%

== Results ==
=== 19th century ===
Elections to the Legislative Assembly of Quebec (1867–1900) – seats won by party
| Government | Conservative | | | Liberal | Conservative | Liberal | | Conservative | Liberal | |
| Party | 1867 | 1871 | 1875 | 1878 | 1881 | 1886 | 1890 | 1892 | 1897 | 1900 |
| Conservative | 51 | 46 | 43 | 32 | 49 | 26 | 23 | 51 | 23 | 7 |
| Liberal | 12 | 19 | 19 | 31 | 15 | 33 | 43 | 21 | 51 | 67 |
| Independent Conservative | | | 3 | 2 | 1 | 3 | 1 | 1 | | |
| Independent Liberal | 1 | | | | | | | | | |
| Parti national | | | | | | 3 | 5 | | | |
| Parti ouvrier | | | | | | | 1 | | | |
| Vacant | 1 | | | | | | | | | |
| Total | 65 | 65 | 65 | 65 | 65 | 65 | 73 | 73 | 74 | 74 |

=== Liberal–Conservative era (1904–1935) ===
Elections to the Legislative Assembly of Quebec (1904–1935) – seats won by party
| Government | Liberal | | | | | | | | |
| Party | 1904 | 1908 | 1912 | 1916 | 1919 | 1923 | 1927 | 1931 | 1935 |
| Liberal | 67 | 57 | 63 | 75 | 74 | 64 | 74 | 79 | 47 |
| Conservative | 7 | 14 | 16 | 6 | 5 | 20 | 9 | 11 | 17 |
| Action libérale nationale | | | | | | | | | 25 |
| Ligue nationaliste | | 3 | 1 | | | | | | |
| Independent Liberal | | | 1 | | | | | | |
| Parti ouvrier | | | | | 2 | | | | |
| Other | | | | | | 1 | 2 | | |
| Total | 74 | 74 | 81 | 81 | 81 | 85 | 85 | 90 | 89 |

=== Union Nationale–Liberal era (1936–1973) ===
Elections to the Legislative Assembly of Quebec (1936–1973) – seats won by party
| Government | UN | Liberal | UN | | | | Liberal | | UN | Liberal | |
| Party | 1936 | 1939 | 1944 | 1948 | 1952 | 1956 | 1960 | 1962 | 1966 | 1970 | 1973 |
| Union Nationale | 76 | 15 | 48 | 82 | 68 | 72 | 43 | 31 | 56 | 17 | |
| Liberal | 14 | 70 | 37 | 8 | 23 | 20 | 51 | 63 | 50 | 72 | 102 |
| Bloc Populaire | | | 4 | | | | | | | | |
| Parti social démocratique | | | 1 | | | | | | | | |
| Ralliement creditiste | | | | | | | | | | 12 | 2 |
| Parti Québécois | | | | | | | | | | 7 | 6 |
| Other | | 1 | 1 | 2 | 1 | 1 | 1 | 1 | 2 | | |
| Total | 90 | 86 | 91 | 91 | 92 | 93 | 95 | 95 | 108 | 108 | 110 |

=== Recent years ===
Elections to the National Assembly of Quebec (1976–2026) – seats won by party
| Government | PQ | | Liberal | | PQ | | Liberal | | | PQ | Liberal | CAQ | | PQ |
| Party | 1976 | 1981 | 1985 | 1989 | 1994 | 1998 | 2003 | 2007 | 2008 | 2012 | 2014 | 2018 | 2022 | 2026 |
| Coalition Avenir Québec | | | | | | | | | | 19 | 22 | 74 | 90 | |
| Liberal | 26 | 42 | 99 | 92 | 47 | 48 | 76 | 48 | 66 | 50 | 70 | 32 | 21 | 39 |
| Parti Québécois | 71 | 80 | 23 | 29 | 77 | 76 | 45 | 36 | 51 | 54 | 30 | 10 | 3 | 60 |
| Québec solidaire | | | | | | | | | 1 | 2 | 3 | 10 | 11 | 9 |
| Union Nationale | 11 | | | | | | | | | | | | | |
| Action démocratique du Québec | | | | | 1 | 1 | 4 | 41 | 7 | | | | | |
| Ralliement creditiste | 1 | | | | | | | | | | | | | |
| Parti national populaire | 1 | | | | | | | | | | | | | |
| Equality | | | | 4 | | | | | | | | | | |
| Conservative Party of Quebec | | | | | | | | | | | | | | 19 |
| Total | 110 | 122 | 122 | 125 | 125 | 125 | 125 | 125 | 125 | 125 | 125 | 125 | 125 | 127 |

== Political issues ==
=== National Question ===
The National Question is the debate regarding the future of Quebec and the status of it as a province of Canada. Political parties are organized along ideologies that favour independence from Canada (sovereigntist or separatist) and various degrees of autonomy within Canada (autonomists or federalists). Social democrats, liberals, and conservatives are therefore present in most major parties, creating internal tensions.

=== Federalism ===
==== Canadian Liberalism ====
Federal Liberals largely defend Quebec's remaining within Canada and keeping the status quo regarding the Canadian constitution. They embrace the liberalism held by former Prime Minister Pierre Trudeau and view Canada as a bilingual, multicultural nation based on individual rights. They stress that their nationalism is based on shared civic values, and reject nationalism defined solely on English or French Canadian culture. They defend the need for the federal government to assume the major role in the Canadian system, with occasional involvement in areas of provincial jurisdiction. English-speaking Quebecers, immigrants, and aboriginal groups in northern Quebec strongly support this form of federalism. They may recognize the national status of Quebec, but only informally in the cultural and sociological sense. The traditional vehicle for "status-quo" federalists is the Liberal Party of Canada, although elements of the Conservative Party of Canada have adopted aspects of this position.

The social-democratic New Democratic Party supports Quebec's right to self-determination, but they are firmly opposed to sovereignty, and do not support any major devolving of economic and political powers to Quebec's provincial government.

==== Federalist Quebec autonomism ====
The Quebec autonomists are pro-autonomy movement who believe Quebec should seek to gain more political autonomy as a province while remaining a part of the Canadian federation. In 2018 election that the only Autonomist party Coalition Avenir Québec successfully won over most of Quebec population since the Union Nationale in the mid-20th century with this view about the future of Quebec's political status.

==== Federalist Quebec nationalism ====
The federalist nationalists are nationalists who believe it is best for the people of Quebec to reform the Canadian Confederation in order to accommodate the wish of Quebecers to continue to exist as a distinct society by its culture, its history, its language, and so on. They recognize the existence of the Quebec political (or civic) nation; however, they do not think Quebecers truly wish to be independent from the rest of Canada. Before the arrival of the Parti Québécois, all major Quebec parties were federalist and nationalist. Since then, the party most associated with this view is the Liberal Party of Quebec. On two occasions, federalist nationalists of Quebec attempted to reform the Canadian federation together with allies in other provinces. The 1990 Meech Lake Accord and the 1992 Charlottetown Accord were both ultimately unsuccessful.

=== Sovereignism (separatism) ===
==== Soft nationalists ====
So-called "soft nationalists" have been characterized as "those who were willing to support Quebec independence only if they could be reasonably reassured that it would not produce economic hardship in the short term", and as "people who call themselves Quebecers first, Canadians second". They are the voters who gave Brian Mulroney two back-to-back majorities in the 1980s, when he promised to bring Quebec into Canada's constitution "with honour and enthusiasm."" They swing between a desire for full independence, and for the recognition of Quebec nationhood and independence within Canada. They are typically swing voters, and tend to be swayed by the political climate, becoming "harder" nationalists when angered by perceived rejection by English Canada (such as the blocking of the Meech Lake Accord), but "softening" when they perceive sovereigntists as threatening the economic and social stability seemingly afforded by Canadian federalism.

Many also view the spectre of Quebec secession as a useful negotiation tool to gain more powers within Confederation. For example, Daniel Johnson Sr ran on a platform of Égalité ou indépendance (Equality or independence) in the late 1960s as a way of pressing for increased powers from the federal government. Lucien Bouchard expressed similar sentiments as a student.

==== Sovereigntists ====
Sovereigntists are moderate nationalists who do not believe Canada to be reformable in a way that could answer what they see as the legitimate wish of Quebecers to govern themselves freely. They opt for the independence of Quebec; however, at the same time, they insist on offering an economic and political partnership to the rest of Canada on the basis of the equality of both nations. The political parties created by the sovereigntists created are the Bloc Québécois and the Parti Québécois, which its members define as a party of social democratic tendency. The Parti Québécois organized a 1980 referendum and a 1995 referendum, each of which could have led to negotiations for independence had it succeeded. The No side prevailed in both, but its margin was very narrow in the second referendum (50.6% No, 49.4% Yes). Sovereigntists find their ideological origins in the Mouvement Souveraineté-Association, René Lévesque's short-lived precursor to the Parti Québécois.

==== Indépendantistes ====
Indépendentistes are fully nationalist in outlook. They view the federal government as a successor state to the British Empire, and as a de facto colonizing agent of English Canada. Consequently, they demand complete independence for Quebec, which they view in the context of national liberation movements in Africa and the Caribbean of the 1960s. Independence is seen as the culmination of a natural societal progression, from colonization to provincial autonomy to outright independence. Accordingly, they tend to favour assertive declarations of independence over negotiations, idealizing the Patriote movement of the 1830s. Their ideological origins can be found within the Rassemblement pour l'indépendance nationale headed by Pierre Bourgault, a founding organization of the Parti Québécois.

== Political parties ==
=== Major political parties ===
==== Provincial ====
- The Quebec Liberal Party (PLQ)
- The Parti Québécois (PQ)
- The Québec Solidaire party (QS)
- The Conservative Party of Quebec (PCQ)

==== Federal ====
- The New Democratic Party of Canada (NDP)
- The Bloc Québécois (BQ)
- The Liberal Party of Canada (L)
- The Conservative Party of Canada (C)
- The Green Party of Canada (GPC)
- The People's Party of Canada (PPC)

=== Other recognized provincial parties ===
- The Coalition Avenir Québec (CAQ)
- The Parti vert du Québec (Green Party/PVQ)
- The Bloc pot
- The Parti marxiste-léniniste du Québec
- The Parti Unité Nationale
- Affiliation Quebec

=== Historical parties ===
- Château Clique/Parti bureaucrate (pre-Confederation)
- Parti canadien/Parti patriote (1806–1837)
- Parti rouge (1847–1867)
- Parti bleu (1854–1867)
- Conservative Party of Quebec (1867–1936)
- Action libérale nationale (1934–1939)
- Union Nationale (1935–1989)
- Fédération du Commonwealth Coopératif/Parti social démocratique du Québec (1939–1961)
- Parti ouvrier-progressiste/Labor-Progressive Party (1944–1960)
- Ralliement créditiste du Québec (1970–1978)
- Bloc populaire (1942–1947)
- New Democratic Party of Quebec (2014–2026)
- Rassemblement pour l'indépendance nationale (1960–1968)
- Parti républicain du Québec (1962–1964)
- Ralliement national (1966–1968)
- Equality Party (1989–2012)
- Nouveau Parti démocratique du Québec/Parti de la Democratie Socialiste (1963–2002)
- Union des forces progressistes (2002–2006)

== Public policies ==
=== National policy ===
Quebec's national policy covers all areas relating to the Quebec nation. It establishes the values and foundations on which Quebec society bases its cohesion and its specificity. The Québécois constitution is enshrined in a series of social and cultural traditions that are defined in a set of judicial judgments and legislative documents, including the Loi sur l'Assemblée Nationale ("Law on the National Assembly"), the Loi sur l'éxecutif ("Law on the Executive"), and the Loi électorale du Québec ("Electoral Law of Quebec"). Other notable examples include:

- the Charter of Human Rights and Freedoms
- the Charter of the French language
- the Civil Code of Quebec

It is also based on a set of statements which clarify and reinforce already established social practices. For example, in his press release on February 8, 2007, Jean Charest reaffirmed three of Quebec society's fundamental values:

- the equality between men and women
- the primacy of French
- the separation of State and religion

In addition, Quebec defines itself as a free and democratic state of law.

On October 30, 2003, the National Assembly adopted a resolution reaffirming that the people of Quebec form a nation, as well as a motion on May 22, 2008, citing:

"That the National Assembly reiterates its desire to promote the language, history, culture and values of the Québécois nation, promote integration into our nation in a spirit of openness and reciprocity, and bear witness to its attachment to our religious and historical heritage represented by the crucifix in our Blue Room and by our coat of arms adorning our institutions."

=== Federal policy ===
Quebec participates in federal political life in different ways.

Since 1969, the Official Languages Act has allowed Quebec to integrate better into the Canadian community, in addition to guaranteeing a legal and linguistic context conducive to the development of the province.

The Quebec premier is part of the Council of the Federation, which allows it to participate proactively in the federation.

Quebec possesses a network of three offices, each led by one station chief, for representing itself and defending its interests in Canada: one in Moncton (for Atlantic Canada), one in Toronto (for Ontario and Western Canada) and one in Ottawa (for the federal government). These offices' mandate is to ensure an institutional presence of the Government of Quebec near other Canadian governments and to allow Quebec to interact effectively with the other provinces of the country.

=== International policy ===
Quebec's international policy is founded upon the Gérin-Lajoie doctrine, formulated in 1965. While Quebec's Ministry of International Relations coordinates guiding principles in international policy, its Quebec's general delegations that are the main interlocutors in foreign countries. In matters relating to Quebec law, or matters relating to treaties, deals, accords and programs, only Quebecois political bodies have negotiatic power, along with heads of state, governments, embassies and foreign consulates. Under the rule of law, any agreement made abroad, by the federal or Quebecois government, is only applicable in domestic politics by the consent of popular sovereignty.

Quebec is the only Canadian province that has set up a ministry to exclusively embody the state's powers for matters of international relations. In other provinces, the general tendency is to entrust this type of mandate to a minister that was already carrying out other responsibilities (most likely in intergovernmental relations).

Quebec is a member of the Assemblée parlementaire de la Francophonie and of the Organisation internationale de la francophonie.

=== Environmental and energy policies ===
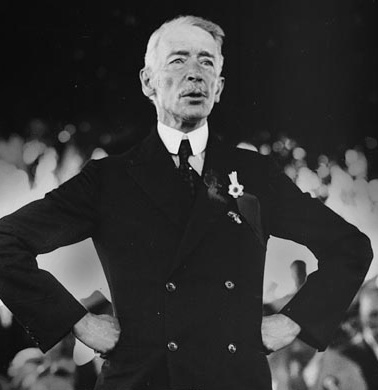
Louis-Alexandre Taschereau, Premier from 1920 to 1936. He successfully put an end to the Grande Hémorragie and was the first to see the hydroelectric potential of Nunavik.

Since 2006, Quebec has adopted a green plan in order to meet the objectives of the Kyoto Protocol regarding climate change. The Ministry of Sustainable Development, Environment, and Fight Against Climate Change (MELCC) is the primary entity responsible for the application of environmental policy on the Québécois territory. The Société des établissements de plein air du Québec (SEPAQ) is the main body responsible for the management of national parks, wildlife reserves, etc.

On November 23, 2009, Jean Charest announced Quebec's greenhouse gas reduction targets at the Copenhagen conference: Quebec intended to reduce its emissions by 20% by 2020 (compared to the emissions of 1990) and will focus on the transportation sector, which accounts for 40% of GHG emissions in Quebec. Following this announcement, the government undertook the initiatives needed to keep its promises. On January 14, 2010, a law came into effect aimed at reducing vehicle GHGs. Automobile manufacturers who sell vehicles in Quebec have to comply with an emission ceiling of 187 g of GHG/km. This emission level was also lowered every year until it fell to 127 g of GHG/km in 2016. Manufacturers have to obtain an emission average equivalent to that of the enforced level, so they are still be able to sell vehicles that sometimes exceed this threshold. These standards are as strict as those of California (United States), according to the Government of Quebec.

Hydroelectricity is Quebec's main energy source. The Hydro-Québec corporation, owned by the government of Quebec, is the main producer and provider of this renewable and low-pollution energy. Hydro-Québec is a profitable company in constant expansion (for example the Manic-Outardes project, the James Bay Project, the Romaine project, etc.). Wind energy also sees modest use.

The population of Quebec seems to be more sensitive to environmental issues than the population of other Canadian provinces. According to a 2019 university study, 67% of Québécois residents are aware of humanity's impact on global warming, while the figure drops to 47% in Saskatchewan and to 42% in Alberta. The economic structure of each of these provinces could be one explanation: "Quebec does not produce petroleum, but mainly hydroelectricity. Compared to Alberta... There is the whole structure of the economy that could explain this phenomenon" analyzes the academic Erick Lachapelle. Nearly 500,000 people took part in a climate protest on the streets of Montreal in 2019.

=== Agricultural and forestry policies ===
Agriculture in Quebec has been subject to agricultural zoning regulations since 1978. Faced with the problem of expanding urban sprawl, agricultural zones were created to ensure the protection of fertile land, which make up 2% of Quebec's total area. The Commission de protection du territoire agricole du Québec (CPTAQ) is the main guarantor. The city of Saint-Hyacinthe is the agricultural technopole of Quebec and is recognized for its agro-food, veterinary and agro-environmental biotechnology.

Quebec's forests are essentially public property. The calculation of annual cutting possibilities is the responsibility of the Bureau du forestier en chef. The Société de protection des forêts contre le feu (SOPFEU) works in a public-private partnership with the Quebec government in order to protect forests against forest fires. The Union des producteurs agricoles (UPA) seeks to protect the interests of its members, including forestry workers, and works jointly with the Ministry of Agriculture, Fisheries and Food (MAPAQ) and the Ministry of Energy and Natural Resources.

=== Employment, taxation and immigration policies ===
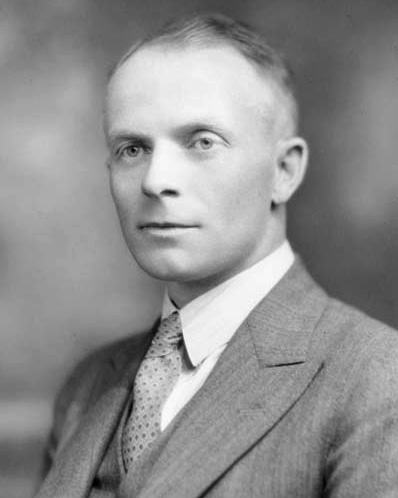
Adélard Godbout, Premier from 1939 to 1944. He granted women the right to vote in 1940, made education compulsory until age 14, introduced free primary school education, and affirmed workers' rights to unionize.

The Ministère de l'Emploi et de la Solidarité sociale du Québec has the mandate to oversee social and workforce developments through Emploi-Québec and its local employment centers (CLE). This ministry is also responsible for managing the Régime québécois d'assurance parentale (QPIP) as well as last-resort financial support for families and people in need. The Commission des normes, de l'équité, de la santé et de la sécurité du travail (CNESST) is the main body responsible for the application of labour laws in Quebec and enforcing the collective agreements concluded between unions of employees and their employers.

When it comes to taxation, Revenu Québec takes the majority of its revenue through a progressive income tax, a 9.975% sales tax and various other taxes (such as carbon, corporate and capital gains taxes), equalization payments from the federal government, transfer payments from other provinces and direct payments. By some measures Quebec is the highest taxed province; a 2012 study indicated that "Quebec companies pay 26 per cent more in taxes than the Canadian average". A 2014 report by the Fraser Institute indicated that "Relative to its size, Quebec is the most indebted province in Canada by a wide margin".

Immigration to Quebec is supported by integration programs favouring French, as it is the common language, as well as the principles of pluralism and interculturalism. The Ministère de l'Immigration et des Communautés culturelles du Québec is responsible for the selection and integration of immigrants, and immigration policy favours respect for Québécois values as well as respect for Quebec's cultural, historical and social characteristics.

=== Health, social and education policies ===
Quebec's health and social services network is administered by the Ministry of Health and Social Services. It is composed of 95 réseaux locaux de services (RLS; 'local service networks') and 18 agences de la santé et des services sociaux (ASSS; 'health and social services agencies'). Quebec's health system is supported by the Régie de l'assurance maladie du Québec (RAMQ) which works to maintain the accessibility of services for all citizens of Quebec. Pre-hospital care and rescue missions are provided by foundations and non-profit organizations.

The centres de la petite enfance (CPEs; 'centres for young children') are institutions that link family policies to education. They are administered by the Ministère de la Famille et des Aînés du Québec. Quebec's education system is administered by the Ministry of Education and Higher Education (primary and secondary schools), the Ministère de l'Enseignement supérieur (CEGEP) and the Conseil supérieure de l'Education du Québec. Postsecondary studies include : the public university of the University of Quebec, vocational training centers, private colleges, public colleges (CEGEPs), and private universities.

In 2012, the annual cost for postsecondary tuition was CA$2,168 (€1,700)—less than half of Canada's average tuition. Quebec universities are among the least expensive in Canada. Part of the reason for this is the relative democratization of higher education implemented during the Quiet Revolution of the 1960s, when the Quebec government froze tuition fees to a relatively low level and created CEGEPs. When Jean Charest's government decided in 2012 to sharply increase university fees, students protests erupted. Because of these protests, Quebec's tuition fees remain relatively low today.

=== Linguistic demographics ===
Francophones in Quebec tend to vote for the Parti Québécois, While Non-Francophones tend to vote for the Quebec Liberal Party.

== International organizations ==
Quebec is a participating government in the international organization the Francophonie, which can be seen as a sort of Commonwealth of Nations for French-speaking countries. Since the 1960s, Quebec has an international network of delegations which represent the Government of Quebec abroad. It is currently represented in 28 foreign locations and includes six General delegations (government houses), four delegations (government offices), nine government bureaus, six trade branches, and three business agents.

Through its civil society, Quebec is also present in many international organizations and forums such as Oxfam, the World Social Forum, and World March of Women.

== See also ==
- Politics of Canada
- Political culture of Canada
- Council of the Federation
- État québécois
- Quebec general elections
- List of Quebec premiers
- List of Quebec leaders of the Opposition
- List of Quebec senators
- National Assembly of Quebec
- Political parties in Quebec
- History of Quebec
- Timeline of Quebec history
- Quebec nationalism
- Quebec sovereigntism
- Constitution of Quebec
- Quebec federalism
- Quebec Charter of Human Rights and Freedoms
- Reference re Secession of Quebec
- Bill 78
