= Quebec nationalism =

North American political ideology

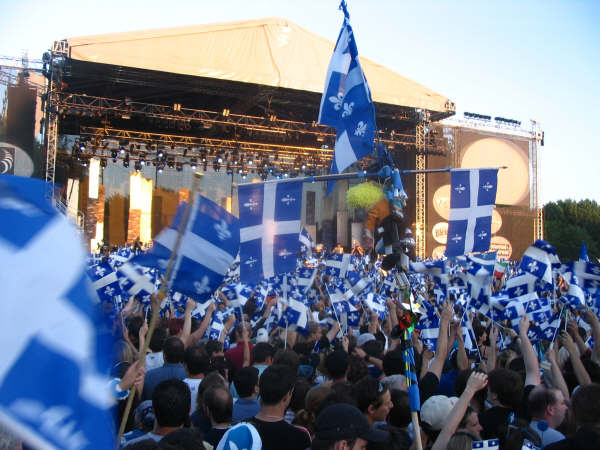
Celebration of Saint-Jean-Baptiste Day on June 24 at Parc Maisonneuve in Montréal

Quebec nationalism or Québécois nationalism is a political ideology that prioritizes cultural belonging to, the defence of the interests of, and the recognition of the political legitimacy of the Québécois nation. It has been a movement and a central issue in Quebec politics since the beginning of the 19th century. Québécois nationalism has seen several political, ideological and partisan variations and incarnations over the years.

Quebec nationalism plays a central role in the political movement for the independence of Quebec from Canada. Several groups and political parties claim to be Québécois nationalists. The autonomist political parties, which do not want the sovereignty of Quebec but the expansion of its powers and the defence of its specificity within Canada, such as the Coalition Avenir Québec, also claim to be Québécois nationalists.

Quebec nationalism was first known as "French Canadian nationalism", but was replaced by "Québécois nationalism" during the Quiet Revolution.

== Canadien liberal nationalism ==
=== New France ===
The settlement of New France was made up of 7 regions that spanned from the Maritimes to the Rockies and from the Hudson Bay to the Gulf of Mexico. Although this landscape was vast, most efforts were made to colonize what is now present-day Canada. After the 17th century, the newly arrived French settlers adapted to the terrain of New France. Over time, these settlers developed a regional Canadian identity. This could be seen in the developing of new accents, creation of new legends and stories, emerging societal traits and the use of the French language. The latter originated with the loss of the settlers' langue d'oïls and the adoption of standard French, which came to be used by the educated classes of the colony. It further developed from the levelling of many langues d'oïl which led to the creation of a local accent.

During this time, the newly arrived immigrants were no longer seen as immigrants but rather people who embodied not only a Canadian identity, but also a provincial identity as well. Moreover, this was complemented by the fact that 95% of the colonists were Francophones, while the remaining people were English-speaking. However, this would prove to create contention later on.

=== 1534–1774 ===
Canada was first established as a French colony. Jacques Cartier claimed it for France in 1534, and permanent French settlement began in 1608. It was part of New France, which constituted all French colonies in North America. Up until 1760, Canadien nationalism had developed itself free of all external influences. However, during the Seven Years' War, the British invaded New France as part of the French and Indian War, winning a conclusive victory at the Battle of the Plains of Abraham. At the Treaty of Paris, France agreed to abandon its claims over New France in return for the island of Guadeloupe. From the 1760s onward, Canadien nationalism developed within a British constitutional context. Despite intense pressure from outside Parliament, the British government drafted the Quebec Act which guaranteed Canadiens the restoration of French civil law; guaranteed the free practice of the Catholic faith; and returned the territorial extensions that they had enjoyed before the Treaty of Paris. In effect, this "enlightened" action by leaders in the British Parliament allowed French Canada to retain its unique characteristics. Although detrimental to Britain's relationship with the Thirteen Colonies, this has, in its contemporary assessment, been viewed as an act of appeasement and was largely effective at dissolving Canadien nationalism in the 18th century (especially considering the threat and proximity of American revolutionary ideology) yet it became less effective with the arrival of Loyalists after the revolutions. With the Loyalists splitting the province of Quebec into two identities; Upper Canada and Lower Canada, Canadiens were labelled by the Loyalists as French Canadians.

=== 1800s–1880s ===
From 1776 to the late 1830s, the world witnessed the creation of many new national states with the birth of the United States, the French Republic, Haiti, Paraguay, Argentina, Chile, Mexico, Brazil, Peru, Gran Colombia, Belgium, Greece and others. Often accomplished militarily, these national independence movements occurred in the context of complex ideological and political struggles pitting European metropoles against their respective colonies, often assuming the dichotomy of monarchists against republicans. These battles succeeded in creating independent republican states in some regions of the world, but they failed in other places, such as Ireland, Upper Canada, Lower Canada, and Germany.

There is no consensus on the exact time of the birth of a national consciousness in French Canada. Some historians defend the thesis that it existed before the 19th century, because the Canadiens saw themselves as a people culturally distinct from the French even in the time of New France. The cultural tensions were indeed palpable between the governor of New France, the Canadian-born Pierre de Vaudreuil and General Louis-Joseph de Montcalm, a Frenchman, during the French and Indian War. However, the use of the expression la nation canadienne, (the Canadian nation) by French Canadians began in the 19th century. The idea of a nation canadienne was supported by the liberal or professional class in Lower Canada: lawyers, notaries, librarians, accountants, doctors, journalists, and architects, among others. The term la nation canadienne-française became more common after the Act of the Union in 1840.

A political movement for the independence of the Canadien people slowly took form following the enactment of the Constitutional Act of 1791. This act of the British Parliament created two colonies, Lower Canada and Upper Canada, each of which had its own political institutions. In Lower Canada, the French-speaking and Catholic Canadiens held the majority in the elected legislative assembly, but were either a small minority or simply not represented in the appointed legislative and executive councils, both appointed by the governor, representing the British Crown in the colony. Most of the members of the legislative council and the executive council were part of the British ruling class, composed of wealthy merchants, judges, militia officers and other members of the elite supportive of the Tory party. From early 1800 to 1837, the government and the elected assembly were at odds on virtually every issue.

Under the leadership of Speaker Louis-Joseph Papineau, the Parti canadien (renamed Parti patriote in 1826) initiated a movement of reform of the political institutions of Lower Canada. The party's constitutional policy, summed up in the Ninety-Two Resolutions of 1834, called for the election of the legislative and executive councils.

The movement of reform gathered the support of the majority of the representatives of the people among francophones but also among liberal anglophones. A number of the prominent characters in the reformist movement were of British descent, for example John Neilson, Wolfred Nelson, Robert Nelson and Thomas Storrow Brown or of Irish extraction, Edmund Bailey O'Callaghan, Daniel Tracey and Jocquelin Waller.

Two currents existed within the reformists of the Parti canadien: a moderate wing, whose members were fond of British institutions and wished for Lower Canada to have a government more accountable to the elective house's representative and a more radical wing whose attachment to British institutions was rather conditional to this proving to be as good as to those of the neighbouring American republics.

The formal rejection of all 92 resolutions by the Cabinet of the United Kingdom in 1837 led to a radicalization of the patriotic movement's actions. Louis-Joseph Papineau took the leadership of a new strategy which included the boycott of all British imports. During the summer, many popular gatherings (assemblées populaires) were organized to protest against the policy of Great Britain in Lower Canada. In November, Governor Archibald Acheson ordered the arrest of 26 leaders of the patriote movement, among whom Louis-Joseph Papineau and many other reformists were members of parliament. This instigated an armed conflict which developed into the Lower Canada Rebellion.

Following the repression of the insurrectionist movement of 1838, many of the most revolutionary nationalist and democratic ideas of the Parti patriote were discredited.

== Ultramontane nationalism ==
=== 1840s–1950s ===
Although it was still defended and promoted up until the beginning of the 20th century, the French-Canadian liberal nationalism born out of the American and French revolutions began to decline in the 1840s, gradually being replaced by both a more moderate liberal nationalism and the ultramontanism of the powerful Catholic clergy as epitomized by Lionel Groulx.

In opposition with the other nationalists, ultramontanes rejected the rising democratic ideal that the people are sovereign and that the Church should have limited influence in governance. To protect the power of the Church and prevent the rise of democracy and the separation of church-and-state, Lionel Groulx and other intellectuals engaged in nationalistic 'myth-making' or propaganda, to build a nationalistic French-Canadian identity, in purpose to protect the power of the Church and dissuade the public from popular-rule and secularist views. Groulx propagated French-Canadian nationalism and argued that maintaining a Roman Catholic Quebec was the only means to 'emancipate the nation against English power.' He believed the powers of the provincial government of Quebec could and should be used within Confederation, to bolster provincial autonomy (and thus Church power), and advocated it would benefit the French-Canadian nation economically, socially, culturally and linguistically. Groulx successfully promoted Québécois nationalism and the ultra-conservative Catholic social doctrine, to which the Church would maintain dominance in political and social life in Quebec. In the 1920s–1950s, this form of traditionalist Catholic nationalism became known as clerico-nationalism.

=== 1950s ===
In the time leading up to the radical changes of the Quiet Revolution the people of Quebec placed more importance on traditional values in life which included going back to their nationalistic roots.

Nationalism at this time meant restoring the old regime and going back to the concept of a French-Canadian nation built upon Catholicism as it was in the past. The church and state were intertwined and the church greatly dictated legislature falling under the matters of the state.

Nationalism also represented conservation, and in that, not being influenced by the outside world but rather staying within their own borders without room for exploration. Quebec was very closed minded wanting to keep their people and province untouched by the more progressive ideas from the rest of the world. Even in terms of careers, the church governed the state in this aspect and people were working conventional jobs such as in the agricultural industry.

Quebec did not align with the fast-paced urban life of Western society that was reflected across the nation and other countries. The lack of great progression is believed to be attributed to the premier of the province at this time Maurice Duplessis.

Maurice Duplessis returned to win the 1944 election and stayed in the position of premier of Quebec for fifteen years whilst being the leader of the conservative Union Nationale party. The Union Nationale party valued and upheld the traditional definition of nationalism. This meant the province would upkeep its long-established ways of operating with changes being made only within the scope of the conventional values. Because of this, the Union Nationale party was favored by those who wanted to stick to the accustomed lifestyle and disliked by those who wanted a progressive province being brought into the North American culture.

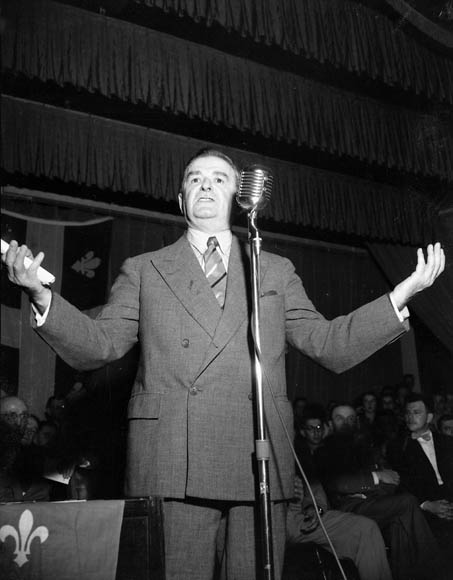
Duplessis giving a speech during the 1952 election campaign

Duplessis's main ideas to transform Quebec were through rapid industrialization, urbanization and a greater and faster development of the province's natural resources. English speakers of the province hoped that industrialization and urbanization would replace the outdated French Canadian society. These changes launched French Canadians into the urban and industrial way of life. There were new opportunities created to provide economic and social stability but by doing so, decreased the importance and significance placed upon cultural and linguistic survival.

However, the deaths of Maurice Duplessis in September 1959 and his successor Paul Sauve in January 1960 set in motion the final end to the old traditional definition of Quebec nationalism in the 1950s. A new leader, Quebec and ideology of nationalism would emerge and sweep across the province finally providing French-Canadians their greatly awaited need for change.

=== 1960s ===
French-Canadian nationalism in the 1960s transformed itself into a new movement; the rise of the Québécois identity endowed the movement with a message that departed from Duplessis's calls for greater provincial autonomy. The 1960s in Quebec saw the province's Quiet Revolution, under the rule of the Liberal Party of Quebec. Later in the decade, Quebec saw the founding of the Parti Québécois, in an attempt to consolidate a variety of sovereigntist movements. During this time, Quebec society grew more liberal, with broad changes in societal values, and the structure of the province's economy. In this time of cultural change, cultural liberalization allowed new, radical currents of political thought to emerge. Quebec would no longer be the last bastion of social conservatism, one with wide-ranging societal involvement from the Catholic Church, in North America, with its moral customs moving towards the North American mainstream during this progressive era.

A main difference was the province's secularization, which saw the influence of the Catholic Church decline in the province. Unlike in the 1950s under Duplessis, church and state were now clearly separate entities, putting an end to the Church's extensive power over the province's institutions.

The election of Jean Lesage and his Liberal Party in the 1960 provincial election ended the longstanding ancien régime that the people of Quebec had been living under. It began the reform of socioeconomic and political structures with the intent of modernizing them, and empowering the province's Francophone majority. These reforms would form part of the broader Quiet Revolution that would transform the province during the decade.

The Quiet Revolution brought significant changes for Quebecers, uniting most (both Anglophones and Francophones) in celebrating the end of the province's perceived cultural backwardness that had characterized Maurice Duplessis's rule. His Union Nationale governments had a decades-long severely conservative tenure, which was later denominated by scholars as the Grande Noirceur. The Quiet Revolution beginning in the 1960s gathered momentum with the many reforms carried out by Jean Lesage including wide-ranging changes to education, provincial welfare programs, healthcare, hydro-electricity, regional development and greater Francophone participation in the province's economy, including its burgeoning industrial sector.

Québécois nationalism, a Francophone movement, was on the rise at this time, inspired by the global context. It was seen as an extension of contemporary decolonization movements; the intellectual basis of this new expression of nationalism among Francophones incorporated foreign influences. The province's newfound openness sparked greater curiosity among those in the province who had been long-isolated culturally; they felt encouraged to go and learn the ways of life in other parts of the world and then return to share, compare, and incorporate the ideologies into their lifestyle.

The perceived oppression of Francophones, particularly in the economic arena, was something that Lesage wanted to bring to light and change because of longstanding cultural and society tensions between Francophones and Anglophones, the province's two historic linguistic groups. Lesage desired to change the role that the state in the province. He believed the state was the engine to end the relative economic dispossession of French Canadians and Francophone society, bolstering organized labor, promoting educational reform, and modernizing the political process.

Linguistic tensions endured in the province during this period due to the imbalance between the Francophones and Anglophones on a variety of levels. Even though the Francophones outnumbered the Anglophones, a significant number of Francophones saw themselves as oppressed; an oppressed majority that was outmatched by a small, Anglophone elite. Colonial cirumstances that led to this reality dated further back than recent decades. The province has a history of colonization and conquest that remains complex and multi-layered.

The province's Francophones, as well as visible minority groups, found themselves struggling to join an economic elite that seemed to largely exclude them. These groups saw social mobility as out-of-reach. Francophones struggled in a world where English was the language of business, and prestigious institutions, from colonial times, remained starkly English-speaking. Francophone culture, and their linguistic peculiarities were relegated to a lesser status.

By the early 1960s, an expanding group of French Canadians from all social classes were receiving education comparable to that of their Anglophone peers; they would go onto careers in Anglophone-dominated institutions.

Advocacy of this new form of nationalism was used to address drastic conditions in the work place as well as lesser living conditions. This was most apparent between progressive Francophones who saw their new expressions of nationalism as part of the global struggle against injustice and non-Anglophone progressives who were predominantly opposed to any and all nationalisms.

The rising Québécois nationalism, endowing French-Canadian nationalism with a new meaning, would continue to develop after its inception during this decade.

== Contemporary Quebec nationalism ==
Understanding contemporary Quebec nationalism is difficult considering the ongoing debates on the political status of the province and its complex public opinion. No political option (outright independence, sovereignty-association, constitutional reforms, or signing on to the present Canadian constitution) has achieved decisive majority support and contradictions remain within the Quebec polity.

One debated subject that has often made the news is whether contemporary Quebec nationalism is still "ethnic" or if it is "linguistic" or "territorial".

The notion of "territorial nationalism" (promoted by all Quebec premiers since Jean Lesage) gathers the support of the majority of the sovereigntists and essentially all Quebec federalist nationalists. Debates on the nature of Quebec's nationalism are currently going on and various intellectuals from Quebec or other parts of Canada have published works on the subject, notably Will Kymlicka, professor of philosophy at Queen's University and Charles Blattberg and Michel Seymour, both professors at the Université de Montréal.

=== Ethnic nationalism ===
Many people feel that Quebec nationalism and separatism is ethnic have often expressed their opinion that the sentiments of Quebec's nationalists are insular and parochial and concerned with preserving a pure laine population of white francophones within the province. Despite these accusations being denounced by many Quebec nationalists who see both the separatist and nationalist movement as multi-ethnic, there is much evidence to suggest that both movements are based on ethnicity, rather than on territory. An example of this is when Premier of Quebec Jacques Parizeau, commenting on the failure of the 1995 Quebec referendum said "It is true, it is true that we were beaten, but in the end, by what? By money and ethnic votes, essentially." ("C'est vrai, c'est vrai qu'on a été battus, au fond, par quoi? Par l'argent puis des votes ethniques, essentiellement."). Another example of this was the implementation of Quebec's Bill 21, which sparked controversy after it banned people from wearing religious clothing in certain professions. This law hugely impacted the Muslim community in the province, with many citing it as proof of the movement's ethnic origins, and calling it Islamophobic, and discriminatory. Further controversy was sparked when most nationalist parties stated that the law was not Islamophobic, and instead stated that it was secular. Paul Plamondon, leader of the Parti Québécois (PQ) called someone in the Quebec government out for saying the law was "supremacist" while talking about systemic racism, which caused even more controversy and a backlash to the PQ by the Muslim community, and by the federalists.

=== Linguistic nationalism ===
Another primary expression of nationalism in Quebec is the French language. People who feel that Quebec nationalism is linguistic have often expressed their opinion that Quebec nationalism includes a multi-ethnic or multicultural French-speaking majority (either as mother tongue or first language used in public).

The entrenchment of the French language in Quebec has been a central goal of Quebec nationalism since the 1970s. In 1974, the Quebec Legislature passed the Official Language Act under Premier Robert Bourassa. This legislation made French the sole official language of Quebec and the primary language of services, commercial signing, labour relations and business, education, and legislation and justice. In 1977, this Official Language Act was superseded by the Charter of the French Language, which expanded and entrenched French within Quebec. This charter was passed by the first Parti Québécois government of Premier René Lévesque, and its goal was "to make French the language of Government and the Law, as well as the normal and everyday language of work, instruction, communication, commerce and business."

After a 45-year hiatus in language legislation in Quebec, the provincial legislature passed An Act respecting French, the official and common language of Québec in 2022. This act greatly expanded the requirement to speak French in many public and private settings. The preliminary notes of the bill make its purpose clear: "the purpose of this bill is to affirm that the only official language of Québec is French. It also affirms that French is the common language of the Québec nation." This act amended the Charter of the French language and introduced "new fundamental language rights," such as reinforcing French as the language of legislation, justice, civil administration, professional orders, employers, commerce and business, and educational instruction. Premier François Legault and his Coalition Avenir Québec government justified this as necessary to preserve the French language that is central to Quebec nationalism.

=== Recognition of the nation by Ottawa ===
On October 21, 2006, during the General Special Council of the Quebec wing of the Liberal Party of Canada initiated a national debate by adopting with more than 80% support a resolution calling on the Government of Canada to recognize the Quebec nation within Canada. A month later, the said resolution was taken to Parliament first by the Bloc Québécois, then by the Prime Minister of Canada, Stephen Harper. On November 27, 2006, the House of Commons of Canada passed a motion recognizing that the "Québécois form a nation within a united Canada".

In 2021, François Legault's Coalition Avenir Québec government in Quebec proposed to amend the Charter of the French Language and the provincial constitution to more strongly entrench French as the sole official language. In response to this, the Bloc Québécois initiated a motion in the House of Commons endorsing the constitutionality of Legault's initiatives and reasserting Quebecers' nationhood. The Commons passed the motion 281–2, with 36 abstentions.

=== Present-day nationalism ===
Quebec nationalism today and what it means to Québécois, Quebecers, Canadiens, Canadians, and others differs based on the individual. Nationalism today is more open than what it was in the past in some ways. A common theme that can be seen is the attachment that Québécois have towards their province, and the country of Canada.

== Nationalist groups ==
=== Political parties and groupings ===
- Bloc Québécois (1991–present)
- Coalition Avenir Québec (2012–present, The party's ideology is mostly nationalist but also promotes Quebec autonomism and some Canadian federalism)
- Option nationale (2012–2018, later fused with Québec Solidaire)
- OUI-Québec
- Parti Indépendantiste (2007–2014)
- Parti Québécois (1968–present)
- Québec debout (2018)
- Québec Solidaire (2006–present)
- Union Nationale (1936–1981, The party's ideology is half nationalist but also half Quebec autonomist)

=== Civic organizations ===
- Mouvement des Jeunes Souverainistes
- Mouvement national des Québécois
- Saint-Jean-Baptiste Societies

=== Academic and intellectual associations ===
- Centre étudiant de recherche et d'action nationale (CERAN) (Student research and national action centre)
- Institut de recherche sur l'autodétermination des peuples et les indépendances nationales (IRAI) (Research Institute on Self-Determination of Peoples and National Independence)
- Les Intellectuels pour la souveraineté (IPSO) (Intellectuals for Sovereignty)

=== Nationalists newspapers and publications ===
- L'Action nationale
- Le Devoir
- Le Jour
- Le Québécois

=== Extremist, nativist and ultra-nationalist groups ===
- Atalante
- Fédération des Québécois de souche (Federation of native Québécois)
- La Meute (2015–present)
- Storm Alliance
- Front de libération du Québec (Quebec Liberation Front)

== Nationalist Slogans ==
- *Québécois de souche ("old-stock Quebecker"): Quebecer who can trace their ancestry back to the regime of New France
- Le Québec aux Québécois ("Quebec for Québécois", or "Quebec for Quebecers"): slogan sometimes chanted at Quebec nationalist rallies or protests. This slogan can be controversial, as it might be interpreted both as a call for a Quebec controlled by Québécois pure laine, with possible xenophobic connotations, or as a call for a Quebec controlled by the inhabitants of the province of Quebec, and free from outside interference.
- Maîtres chez nous ("Masters of our own house" a phrase coined by Le Devoir editor André Laurendeau, and was the electoral slogan of the Liberal Party during the 1962 election.
- Québécois pure laine: "true blue" or "dyed-in-the-wool" Quebecker

== See also ==
- 1980 Quebec referendum
- 1995 Quebec referendum
- Canadian nationalism
- Clarity Act
- French nationalism
- History of Quebec
- Lists of active separatist movements
- Nationalism
- Partition of Quebec
- Politics of Canada
- Politics of Quebec
- Quebec federalist ideology
- Quebec sovereignty movement
- Quiet Revolution
