= Distinct society =

Term referring to Quebec's status in Canadian constitutional politics

The province of Quebec, in red, which some argue is a distinct society within Canada.

Distinct society (in French: la société distincte) is a political term especially used during constitutional debate in Canada, in the second half of the 1980s and in the early 1990s, and present in the two failed constitutional amendments, the Meech Lake Accord and the Charlottetown Accord. "Distinct society" refers to the uniqueness of the province of Quebec within Canada, although here the meaning of "unique" is vague and controversial.

== Origin ==
Quebec is not explicitly declared distinct in the Constitution of Canada. However, constitutional scholar Peter Hogg argues that several parts of the Constitution already indicate Quebec has distinctiveness that should be reflected in law. Canadian federalism itself, bilingualism in the federal and Quebec legislatures, educational rights, and the acknowledgment of the importance of Roman Catholicism in Quebec were cited as examples.

Experts disagree on whether Quebec is a "distinct society" or "unique culture", and whether and how to enshrine such status in the Constitution. The term "distinct society" was invented as a description for the province by Jean Lesage, Quebec's Premier from 1960 to 1966. In addition to using this terminology, Lesage also advocated that Quebec's special status be recognized in the Constitution, which presaged the constitutional amendments later proposed in the Meech Lake and Charlottetown Accords. Lesage did not achieve his desired constitutional amendment as premier.

Quebec was also referred to as a distinct society by the Royal Commission on Bilingualism and Biculturalism.

== The Meech Lake Accord ==
The Meech Lake Accord, proposed (but never enacted) amendments to the Constitution from 1987 to 1990, would have inserted the phrase "distinct society" into the Constitution Act, 1867 as part of the new section 2 of that Act (the original section 2 of the Act had already been repealed; currently there still is no section 2). In doing so, the Accord would have recognized the difference of Quebec from the rest of Canada, and perhaps implicitly recognized Quebec as a nation. As author Marjorie Bowker wrote, it was primarily a reference to Quebec's "laws, its language and its culture." The National Assembly of Quebec was then referred to in the Accord as having the power to protect Quebec's distinctiveness.

It is controversial as to whether Quebec can be referred to as a nation, and the use of that word in the official papers of the Accord would have probably doomed its approval in the rest of Canada. However, the "distinct society" euphemism itself seems to have shocked English Canadians, partly leading to the demise of the accord in the other provinces. Some critics, such as the Reform Party of Canada, saw it as granting special status to Quebec, which offended their vision of Canada in which all provinces are equal. Others feared that if the National Assembly was empowered to promote Quebec's distinctiveness, a provincial government might decide Quebec must secede in order to keep its distinctiveness.

Quebec Premier Robert Bourassa of the Quebec Liberal Party was a major advocate of the distinct society clause. He regarded it as granting Quebec powers that were vague and thus within the Quebec National Assembly's power to help determine; indeed, what makes Quebec distinct could change in the future, and the distinct society clause would still recognize Quebec's progress. The Prime Minister of Canada, Brian Mulroney of the Conservatives, however, had lower expectations for the legal change it signaled. It was revealed in The Secret Mulroney Tapes that he told Newfoundland Premier Clyde Wells that "distinct society" "means dick" (i.e. nothing).

Hogg was also confident the distinct society clause signalled little legal change. As he wrote in 1988, the distinct society clause is "an affirmation of sociological facts with little legal significance." He believed it was merely a reference to the fact that Quebec is the only province where most Canadians speak French rather than English and that Quebec is the only jurisdiction in Canada that practices civil law rather than common law. The only place in the Accord where he saw Quebec's distinct society given real substance was in the other provisions, as Quebec would gain more powers in regard to immigration. Hence, the only way Hogg saw the distinct society clause as having legal effect would be in how to read the rest of the Constitution, although he did not expect that adding a "distinct society" clause would have much practical impact. Rather than giving Quebec powers, he thought, the distinct society clause would recognize that Quebec already has powers that promote distinctiveness (e.g. educational powers), and, just as before the Meech Lake Accord, the use of these powers, even to protect the distinct society of Quebec, would be limited by the Canadian Charter of Rights and Freedoms. While the Quebec government could infringe upon a right by saying Quebec's distinctiveness is a sufficient reason to do so under Section 1 of the Charter, Section 1 would still demand that the infringement be minimized.

The Accord also recognized that the distinct society clause did not undermine Canada's multiculturalism (protected under section 27 of the Charter) or Aboriginal community (protected under section 25 of the Charter and other constitutional provisions).

== The Charlottetown Accord ==
The Charlottetown Accord (proposed amendments to the Constitution rejected in 1992) had a so-called "Canada clause" that would have also recognized Quebec as a distinct society. In this Accord, "distinct society" was more clearly defined as including "a French-speaking majority, a unique culture and a civil law tradition", and the Charter was specified as having to be interpreted with this in mind.

== The 1995 referendum and beyond ==
In the run-up to the 1995 Quebec referendum, Prime Minister Jean Chrétien opposed recognition of Quebec's distinct society until he reversed himself shortly before the independence vote. However, Ontario Premier Mike Harris refused to support a constitutional amendment on the matter. A House of Commons resolution did endorse recognition of Quebec's distinct society. That recognition asked institutions of government "to take note of this recognition and be guided in their conduct accordingly." Since the death of the Meech and Charlottetown accords, the use of the expression has faded, replaced within Quebec with the term nation to describe Quebec, its people, and its state. On November 27, 2006, the federal House of Commons also voted to recognize the Québécois as a nation within Canada. As only a motion of the House, it is not legally binding.

== Subsequent events ==
In 2021, François Legault's Coalition Avenir Québec government in Quebec proposed to amend the Charter of the French Language and the provincial constitution to more strongly entrench French as the sole official language. In response to this, the Bloc Québécois initiated a motion in the House of Commons endorsing the constitutionality of Legault's initiatives and reasserting Quebecers' nationhood. The Commons passed the motion 281–2, with 36 abstentions.

That the House agree that Section 45 of the Constitution Act, 1982, grants Quebec and the provinces exclusive jurisdiction to amend their respective constitutions and acknowledge the will of Quebec to enshrine in its constitution that Quebecers form a nation, that French is the only official language of Quebec and that it is also the common language of the Quebec nation.

Other euphemisms used mainly by federalist nationalists and federalists outside Quebec are different or unique society. The Calgary Declaration of 1997, for example, describes Quebec as "unique".

== See also ==
- Autonomy
- History of Quebec
- Politics of Quebec
- Quebec federalism
- Quebec sovereigntism
