= Federalism in Quebec =

Federalism in Quebec (French: Fédéralisme au Québec) is the space of political ideologies which support Quebec remaining within the Canadian Confederation and opposition to sovereigntism.

Throughout the sovereignty debate Quebec nationalist sentiment has swung between the federalist and sovereigntist options, with many Quebec nationalists willing to be a part of a Canadian federation with a more decentralized government. English-speaking Quebecers and allophones have been overwhelmingly opposed to Quebec's secession.

Supporters of independence point to their belief that Quebec constitutes a nation due to its unique history, shared major language and common heritage. Opponents of sovereignty generally believe it to be a dangerous idea due to the political, financial, personal and economic ties between Quebecers and other Canadians. Some see it as being unnecessary due to Canada's official bilingualism and multicultural policies, as well as the strong status of the French language and culture in Quebec.

Opponents of Quebec nationalism point to the fact that Quebec is just as ethnically diverse as the rest of Canada and therefore is divisible by different ethnic and language groups, or point to the shared francophone heritage of the rest of Canada (ROC). Many federalists believe that Canada comprises many nations in the cultural and ethnic, non-political sense; and that Quebec can be divided into just as many nations as Ontario or British Columbia.

Most major federal political parties, including the Liberal Party of Canada, the Conservative Party of Canada, the New Democratic Party and the Green Party of Canada support maintaining the status quo with Quebec remaining part of Canada. The Bloc Québécois is the sole sovereigntist federal party with seats in the House of Commons. Two provincial political parties, the Coalition Avenir Québec and the Quebec Liberal Party, support different ideas about Quebec's political status within Canada; the former wants to make Quebec an autonomous province within Canada, while the latter, like its former national parent party, supports maintaining the status quo with Quebec remaining part of Canada.

== Historical context ==
The idea that the Province of Quebec should remain a part of the Canadian Confederation is based on a variety of historical and cultural justifications, principally centred on the composition of Canadian culture prior to Confederation in 1867. The Federalist view of Canadian history suggests that Canada as a nation is intrinsically tied to the Canadian people, a product of imperial synthesis.

The realities of colonial-era life for French and British settlers was heavily influenced by local considerations, such as climate, geography and established Aboriginal societies. The economic realities of New France required a cooperative relationship with these already established societies, and the French were more than willing to do so, recognizing some 39 sovereign Aboriginal nations as strategic partners and allies at the Great Peace of Montreal in 1701. In effect, this singular event best represents proto-Canadian Federalism, and would serve as a model for later political developments.

After the Seven Years' War, the British colonial authority administering the newly created Province of Quebec decided to leave many socio-cultural institutions in place, such as the Catholic Church, French Civil Law, the Seigneurial System, and perhaps most importantly, the traditional agrarian lifestyles and languages of the early Habitants, the first Canadiens. In this sense, Canada was spared the cultural hegemony of the British Empire and was not assimilated. The British were quick to recognize that the French Monarchy and elites were quick to abandon New France, and that a resentment had been growing against imperial domination. The Ancien Régime administration was cognizant of the development of a new culture many years before The Conquest, and decided against pursuing any more involvement in the economically unsustainable colony.

Under British administration, the influx of new capital as a result of the migration of Loyalists into Upper Canada, the Maritimes and the Eastern Townships and the threat of a newly independent and militaristic United States, all led to substantial development for the colony. It is during this period that Quebec and Montreal became the economic focal point of the new colony, and a strong proponent of a new national identity.

During the Rebellions of 1837, Canadian federalists, such as Louis-Joseph Papineau, Wolfred Nelson and William Lyon MacKenzie fought with the British colonial government for enhanced representation, among other grievances.

== Ideological branches ==
While the usual denomination for all followers is simply federalist, two main branches can be sketched out.

=== Quebec nationalist federalism and autonomism ===
Federalist Quebec nationalists defend the concept of Quebec remaining within Canada, while pursuing greater autonomy and national recognition for Quebec within the Canadian federation. This approach to national unity has a long tradition within Canadian federalism that in some respects can be traced back to the compromises of the 19th century that were essential to the unification of Upper and Lower Canada and eventually Confederation.

The Union Nationale under Maurice Duplessis (1930s to 1950s) was nationalist without explicitly calling for independence, prior to the arrival of Daniel Johnson, Sr. as leader. The Parti libéral du Québec represented a progressive, left-leaning variety of federalist nationalism throughout the Lesage and Bourassa eras (1960s to 1990s). However, since the failures of the Meech Lake and Charlottetown accords, and the 1995 Quebec referendum on independence, the party has had no defining plan for official national recognition, albeit in general the Party has taken many stances in favour of autonomy and self-determination.

Recently, the Université de Montréal political philosopher Charles Blattberg has put forward a series of arguments aimed at integrating Québécois nationalism within a renewed Canadian federalism, one that recognizes Canada's multi-national character.

The centre-right, autonomist and Quebec nationalist Coalition Avenir Québec or CAQ, led by former PQ cabinet minister Francois Legault, is now opposed to sovereignty but takes a moderate nationalist approach to identity and favours strongly a primary role for Quebec in its internal affairs. Its predecessor, the more radical right of centre, economic liberal, Action démocratique du Québec, or ADQ, of Mario Dumont took a similar stance after abandoning Quebec sovereignty to favouring of making Quebec of granting political autonomy status within Canada while remaining Quebec nationalists.

More recently at the federal level, the New Democratic Party of Canada moved in the direction of asymmetrical federalism under former leaders Jack Layton and Tom Mulcair, both Quebec natives. This included opposition to the Clarity Act (the Sherbrooke Declaration, which brought the NDP in line with position of the Quebec Liberal Party), and support for enhancing French language rights. Within the Liberal Party of Canada former Prime Minister Paul Martin also supported asymmetrical federalism, albeit he was in favour of the Clarity Act. For the most part though, the federal Liberals are associated with symmetrical federalism.

On the Right, former the Progressive Conservative Party leader and prime minister Joe Clark (who also opposed the Clarity Act), and some Quebec figures within the modern Conservative Party of Canada have also taken a stance in favour of greater autonomy for Quebec within Canada.

Notable asymmetrical federalists have included Tom Mulcair, Jack Layton, Jean Charest, Philippe Couillard, Francois Legault, Paul Martin, Joe Clark, Robert Bourassa, Brian Mulroney, Claude Ryan, and Jean Lesage.

=== "Status-quo" federalism ===
Currently, governmental oversight is shared amongst a federal legislature and a number of legislatures whose power is distributed as per the Constitution.

Federalists in favour of the status quo, or symmetrical federalists, also defend Quebec remaining within Canada; however, they support the status quo division of powers between Ottawa and Quebec City and the current Constitution. Former Liberal Party leader and Prime Minister of Canada, Justin Trudeau at one point suggested that gaining Quebec's signature to the Constitution was not a priority, putting him at odds with many past federalists from his home province.

This strain of Canadian federalism is strictly against reopening the Constitution and supports policies of shared and exclusive provincial jurisdiction in areas such as taxation, healthcare and immigration. They defend the federal government occasionally encroaching on areas that Quebec governments (both federalist and sovereigntist) consider their rightful jurisdiction. In general, federalists of this school of thought are opposed to officially recognising Quebec as a "nation" or "distinct society" within Canada, and support the Clarity Act (legislation introduced by the Chrétien government, essentially giving the federal government the right to establish a "clear majority" threshold for any sovereignty referendum at its own discretion and after the fact - this is opposed by the Quebec Liberal Party).

Notable symmetrical federalists have included Pierre Trudeau, Jean Chrétien, Stéphane Dion and Justin Trudeau.

Although this strain of uncompromising, centralising Canadian federalism is most often associated with the Liberal Party of Canada and the political tradition of Pierre Trudeau, it also has adherents from other parties and across the political spectrum.

=== Related Terms ===
In French, fédération can be defined as: (1) a methodical approach of defining a set of types in regards to complex realities, applied to state organization.

a grouping of various associations, unions, parties, and clubs. It can also be used as synonym for federal state.

In English, federalism has been defined as a "mode of political organization that unites separate states or other polities within an overarching political system in such a way as to allow each to maintain its own fundamental political integrity".

This compromise as political system has been called a “quasi-federal concept”, as well as described as a "post-nation" state.

== Federalist parties ==
=== Represented in the Parliament of Canada ===
- Liberal Party of Canada
- Conservative Party of Canada
- New Democratic Party

=== Represented in the National Assembly of Quebec ===
- Quebec Liberal Party – They have alternated in power with the sovereigntist PQ since the 1970s. The Party disaffiliated itself from the Liberal Party of Canada in 1960. For decades it has acted as a broad tent for federalists from across the political spectrum. Important leaders have included Jean Lesage, Claude Ryan, Robert Bourassa, Jean Charest and Philippe Couillard
- Coalition Avenir Québec – Currently government party in Quebec, originally formed by members of the PQ and Liberal Party, wishing to move past the National Question, the CAQ is now officially opposed to sovereignty albeit it supports a significant degree of autonomy. Its founding leader François Legault is a former member of the Parti Québécois and former sovereigntist, and its ideology is generally speaking fiscally conservative and Quebec autonomist. In the 2018 election, his party won a majority.

== See also ==
- Politics of Quebec
- History of Quebec
- Politics of Canada
- History of Canada
- Quebec nationalism
- Canadian nationalism
- Canadian federalism
- Quebec sovereignty movement
- Autonomism in Quebec

=== Compare ===
- Unionism in the United Kingdom (Unionism in Ireland, Unionism in Scotland, Unionism in Wales, Unionism in England)
- Belgian nationalism
- Yugoslavism
- Soviet people / Soviet socialist patriotism
- Zhonghua minzu (China)
- Austroslavism / Austromarxism / National personal autonomy
