= État québécois =

French term for the state of Quebec

The French term l'État québécois, literally translated, is "the Quebec State".

The term "State" can refer to public authority, or a state apparatus, as in société d'État "a state-owned enterprise, federal crown corporations (sociétés d’État)"). "State" may be used to contrast the provincial government of Quebec with the private sector, or with the federal government of Canada, known as l'État fédéral or l'État canadien.

== Examples of use ==
- L'État et le social au Québec, 1986, Yves Vaillancourt

Le fait que l'État ontarien occupe une place plus restreinte que l'État québécois dans la livraison des services sociaux ne semble pas signifier que le système des services sociaux, qui prévaut en Ontario, se trouverait à l'abri d'un certain nombre de problèmes qu'on retrouve dans les systèmes plus étatisés tel le système québécois.

"The fact that the Ontario State [l'État ontarien] plays a more restricted role than the Quebec State [l'État québécois] in the delivery of social services does not seem to mean that the social service system in place in Ontario is not sheltered from some of the problems found in more publicly run (étatisé, lit. "statized") systems such as the Quebec one."

- Les sociétés d'État et les objectifs économiques du Québec: une évaluation préliminaire., 1979, Pierre Fournier

Ainsi, en 1975, neuf des cent plus importantes compagnies opérant au Québec selon le critère du nombre des employés étaient des sociétés d'État ou des filiales de sociétés d'État. Trois étaient des créations de l'état fédéral (le Canadien National, Air Canada et la Société Radio-Canada), une de la ville de Montréal (la Commission des transports de la Communauté urbaine de Montréal), et cinq de l'État québécois (l'Hydro-Québec, Sidbec, la Société des alcools, Forano et Marine Industries, ces deux dernières étant des filiales de la SGF).

"Thus, in 1975, nine of the hundred largest companies operating in Quebec by number of employees were state enterprises or their subsidiaries. Three were creations of the Federal State [l'État fédéral](Canadian National, Air Canada and the Canadian Broadcasting Corporation), one of the City of Montreal (the Montreal Urban Community Transit Commission) and five of the Quebec State [l'État québécois] (Hydro-Québec, Sidbec, the Société des Alcools (Society of Alcohol), Forano and Marine Industries, the last two being subsidiaries of SGF)."
