= Option Canada =

Short-lived lobby group in Montreal, Canada

Option Canada was a Montreal-based lobby group established by the Canadian Unity Council (CUC) some eight weeks before the voting day of the 1995 Quebec referendum on sovereignty. The CUC created the organization to promote federalism in Quebec, which it could not do directly due to its charitable status. Option Canada received a total of $4.8 million of federal funds and was disbanded shortly after the referendum.

At the time of its operations, the group was composed of businessmen and political organizers of three federalist political parties - the Liberal Party of Canada, the Quebec Liberal Party and the Progressive Conservative Party of Canada. The president of Option Canada was Claude Dauphin, an aide to Paul Martin, at the time Canadian minister of finance.

Option Canada first caught media attention in Quebec when the group created the Committee to Register Voters Outside Quebec. This committee helped those outside of Quebec who were legally eligible to vote in the referendum to register on the province's electoral list so that they could vote by mail. The Committee, which operated during the time of the referendum campaign, handed-out pamphlets which included the Chief Electoral Officer of Quebec form to be added to the list of voters. The pamphlet also provided a toll-free help number which was the same number as the one used by the CUC.

After the referendum, the Chief Electoral Officer of Quebec, Pierre F. Côté, filed 20 criminal charges of illegal expenditures and opened an inquiry into Option Canada. However, the 9 October 1997 Supreme Court of Canada decision in Libman v Quebec (Attorney General) ruled that sections of Quebec's Referendum Act infringed upon the freedoms of expression protected by sections 2(b) and 2(d) of the Canadian Charter of Rights and Freedoms and were thus unconstitutional. Quebec's Chief Electoral Officer consequently had to interrupt the inquiry and drop the charges.

== Grenier report ==
In January 2006, acting on a tip, pro-sovereigntist journalists Normand Lester and Robin Philpot obtained bins of ledgers and cheque stubs which they alleged to be proof of a multi-million dollar transfer from the federal Department of Canadian Heritage through Option Canada to the "No" movement. They co-authored the book Les secrets d'Option Canada (English: The Secrets of Options Canada) detailing their narrative, which caused an uproar and led to the Grenier probe. That same month, Chief Electoral Officer of Quebec Marcel Blanchet, appointed retired Quebec court judge Bernard Grenier to investigate the authors' allegations. Grenier's investigation called almost 100 witnesses who were interviewed in private and reviewed about 4500 documents.

The Globe and Mail newspaper reported that the Royal Canadian Mounted Police (RCMP) had launched an inquiry into Option Canada in December 2005 at the request of the Department of Canadian Heritage, in response to the allegations in the then-unpublished book.

Grenier's report was released in May 2007, with no mandate for laying charges. The report said that Option Canada and the Canadian Unity Council (CUC) spent $539,000 from the federal Heritage Department to illegally support the "No" campaign during the 1995 Quebec Referendum. This undermined Philpot and Lester's allegations that $3.5 million in federal funds was given to the campaign. Philpot and Lester called for a complete investigation.

The report placed responsibility on several figures, alleging that:

- Jocelyn Beaudoin, the CUC director-general, took part in decisions at Option Canada that led to illegal campaign spending.

The report found no evidence that the October 1995 Unity Rally in Montreal was planned to sabotage the sovereigntist movement.

After publishing his report, Grenier said, "I think it's now time to move forward, to move ahead". At his request, the documents and testimony of his inquiry were classified indefinitely.

In May 2023, the Parti Québécois received unanimous approval in the Quebec parliament on a motion calling for the documents to be released.

Jocelyn Beaudoin worked for the Option Canada group during the 1995 Quebec Referendum. He worked as Quebec's representative in Toronto, charged with defending Quebec's interests in Ontario, Western Canada and the territories. He was suspended with pay after the January 2006 publication of Les secrets d'Option Canada, a book which accused Beaudoin of using federal government money for the "No" campaign during the 1995 referendum.

Grenier found that Beaudoin was an Option Canada decision-maker. Grenier said the evidence contradicted Beaudoin's claims he was not involved with Option Canada after 7 September 1995. Beaudoin had instructed personnel, negotiated applications for subsidies, and received $24,000 for his expense account. After the Grenier report was released, he resigned his position.

In Ottawa, Labour and Quebec Economic Development Minister Jean-Pierre Blackburn defended Michelle D'Auray, who Grenier concluded spent $8,583 of Option Canada funds that should have been submitted for approval. D'Auray now serves as Secretary of the Treasury Board of Canada.

== See also ==
- 1995 Quebec referendum
- Sponsorship Scandal
