= 1995 Quebec referendum =

1995 independence referendum

1995 Quebec independence referendum
- October 30, 1995
- Do you agree that Quebec should become sovereign after having made a formal offer to Canada for a new economic and political partnership within the scope of the bill respecting the future of Quebec and of the agreement signed on June 12, 1995? French version Acceptez-vous que le Québec devienne souverain, après avoir offert formellement au Canada un nouveau partenariat économique et politique, dans le cadre du projet de loi sur l'avenir du Québec et de l'entente signée le 12 juin 1995?

Results
Choice	Votes	%
Yes	2,308,360	49.42%
No	2,362,648	50.58%
Valid votes	4,671,008	98.18%
Invalid or blank votes	86,501	1.82%
Total votes	4,757,509	100.00%
Registered voters/turnout	5,087,009	93.52%
- Results by constituency. Shades of blue indicate a "Yes" majority, while shades of red indicate "No". The darker the shade, the larger the majority.

The 1995 Quebec referendum was the second referendum to ask voters in the predominantly French-speaking Canadian province of Quebec whether Quebec should proclaim sovereignty and become an independent country, with the condition precedent of offering a political and economic agreement to Canada.

The culmination of multiple years of debate and planning after the failure of the Meech Lake and Charlottetown constitutional accords, the referendum was launched by the provincial Parti Québécois government of Jacques Parizeau. Despite initial predictions of a heavy sovereignist defeat, an eventful and complex campaign followed, with the "Yes" side flourishing after being taken over by Bloc Québécois leader Lucien Bouchard.

Voting took place on 30 October 1995, and featured the largest voter turnout in Quebec's history (93.52%). The "No" option carried by a margin of 54,288 votes, receiving 50.58% of the votes cast. Parizeau, who announced his pending resignation as Quebec premier the following day, later stated that he would have quickly proceeded with a unilateral declaration of independence had the result been affirmative and negotiations failed or been refused, the latter of which was later revealed as the federal position in the event of a "Yes" victory.

Controversies over both the provincial vote counting and direct federal financial involvement in the final days of the campaign reverberated in Canadian politics for over a decade after the referendum took place. In the aftermath of the close result, the federal government, after unilaterally recognizing Quebec as a distinct society and amending the federal constitutional veto procedure, referred the issue to the Supreme Court of Canada, which stated that the unilateral secession contemplated in the referendum was illegal.

As of 2026, this is the most recent independence referendum in Quebec.

== Background ==
Quebec, a province in Canada since its foundation in 1867, has always been the sole majority French-speaking province. Long ruled by forces (such as the Union Nationale) that focused on affirmation of the province's Francophone and Catholic identity within Canada, the Quiet Revolution of the early 1960s prompted a surge in civic and economic nationalism, as well as voices calling for the independence of the province and the establishment of a nation state. Among these was René Lévesque, who founded the Parti Québécois with like-minded groups seeking independence from Canada. After winning power in 1976, the PQ government held a referendum in 1980 seeking a mandate to negotiate "sovereignty-association" with Canada, which was decisively defeated.

In response to the referendum result, Prime Minister Pierre Trudeau said that he would seek to patriate the Canadian Constitution and institute what would eventually become the Canadian Charter of Rights and Freedoms. During tense negotiations in November 1981, an agreement was reached between Trudeau and nine of the ten provincial premiers, but not Lévesque. The Constitution Act 1982 was enacted without the Quebec National Assembly's approval, after the Supreme Court of Canada ruled against the Quebec government that its consent was not necessary for constitutional change.

New Prime Minister Brian Mulroney and Quebec Liberal premier Robert Bourassa sought a series of constitutional amendments designed to address Quebec's concerns. In the Meech Lake Accord, the federal government and all provincial premiers agreed to a series of amendments that decentralized some powers and recognized Quebec as a distinct society. The Accord, after fierce debate in English Canada, fell apart in dramatic fashion in the summer of 1990, as two provinces failed to ratify it within the three-year time limit required by the constitution. This prompted outrage among Quebec nationalists and a surge in support for sovereignty. While the Accord was collapsing, Lucien Bouchard, a cabinet minister in Mulroney's government, led a coalition of six Progressive Conservative members of parliament and one Liberal MP from Quebec to form a new federal party devoted to Quebec sovereignty, the Bloc Québécois.

Following these events, Bourassa said that a referendum would be held in 1992, with either sovereignty or a new constitutional agreement as the subject. This prompted a national referendum on the Charlottetown Accord of 1992, a series of constitutional amendments that included the proposals of the Meech Lake Accord as well as other matters. The Accord was rejected by a majority of voters both in Quebec and English Canada.

In the 1993 federal election, the Liberals returned to power with a majority government under Jean Chrétien, who had been Minister of Justice during the 1980–81 constitutional discussions and the Bloc Québécois won 54 seats with 49.3% of Quebec's vote. The result made the Bloc the second largest party in the House of Commons, giving it the role of Official Opposition and allowing Bouchard to confront Chrétien in Question Period on a daily basis.

In Quebec, the 1994 provincial election brought the Parti Québécois back to power, led by Jacques Parizeau. The party's platform promised to hold a referendum on sovereignty during the first year of its term in office. The PQ won a majority government with 44.75% of the popular vote, just ahead of the Liberals' 44.4%.

== Prelude ==
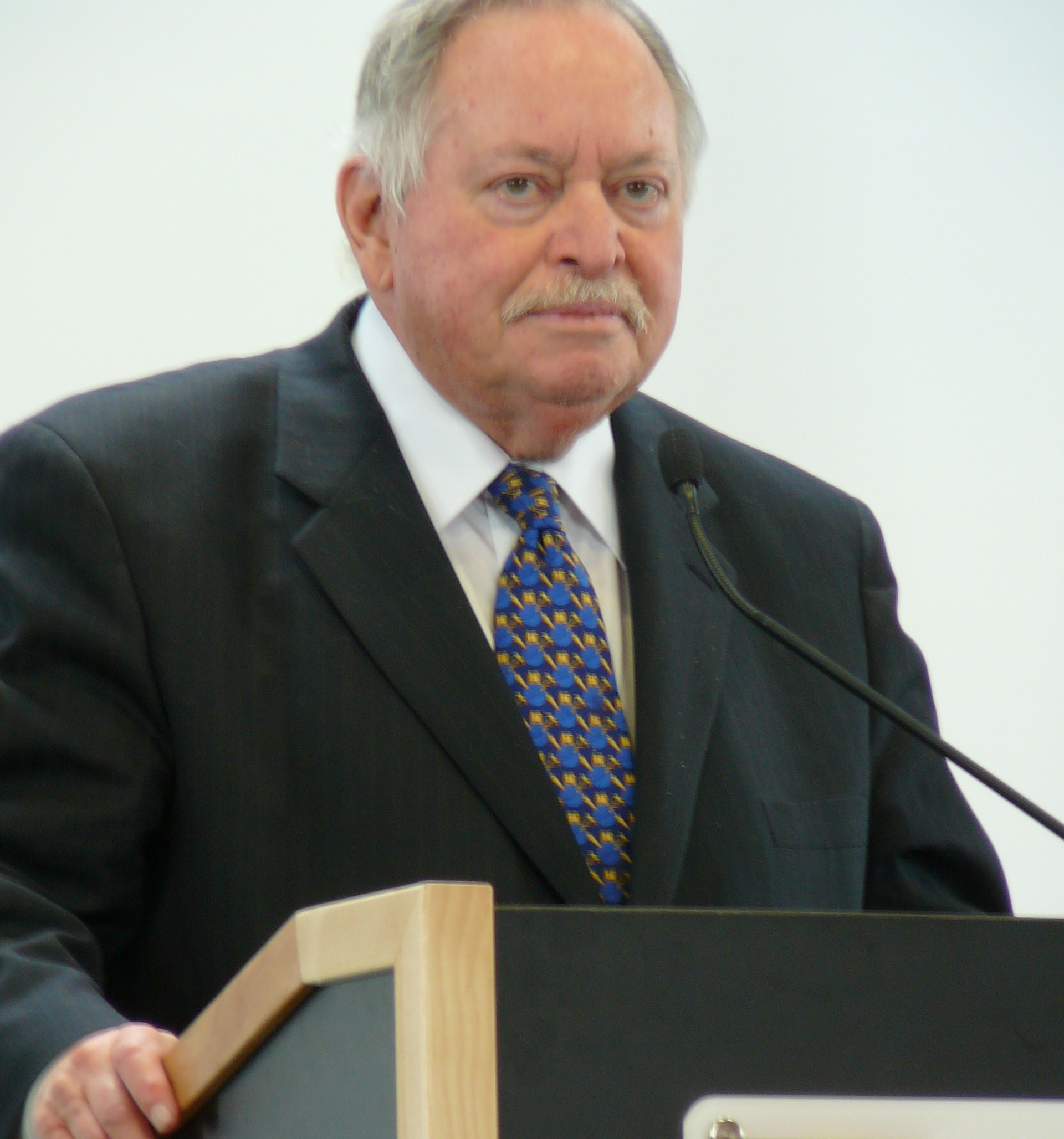
Jacques Parizeau, Premier of Quebec and Leader of the "Yes" Committee

In preparation for the referendum, every household in Quebec was sent a draft of the Act Respecting the Future of Quebec (also referred to as the Sovereignty Bill), with the announcement of the National Commission on the Future of Quebec to commence in February 1995. The commission was boycotted by the Liberal Party of Quebec, the Liberal Party of Canada, and the Progressive Conservative Party of Canada.

The primary issue of debate within the sovereignty movement became on what terms sovereignty would be put before the electorate. Parizeau, long identified with the independantiste wing of the party, was opposed to the PQ's general historical preference for an economic relationship with the rest of Canada to be offered alongside sovereignty, as he thought this would encourage the Federal government to simply refuse to negotiate and cast the project as doomed, as had happened in 1980. As a practical matter, Parizeau believed that given the emotional circumstances of separation a special partnership was unlikely, and that given free trade agreements and other multilateral institutions it was unnecessary.

Parizeau's stance created opposition in the sovereignty movement, which coalesced around Bloc Québécois leader Lucien Bouchard. A popular and charismatic figure, Bouchard had come close to death from necrotizing fasciitis and lost his left leg. His recovery, and subsequent public appearances on crutches, provided a rallying point for sovereigntists and the public at large. Bouchard thought a proposal lacking a partnership would doom the project among soft nationalists (such as himself) who worried about the economic consequences of separation.

As polls showed Parizeau's approach as highly unlikely to even exceed 40% support in a referendum, leaders of the movement engaged in a heated public debate. After Parizeau moved the planned referendum date to the fall, Deputy Premier Bernard Landry aroused ire by stating he would not want to be involved in a "charge of the light brigade." During the Bloc's April conference, after a speech demanding a change in direction, Bouchard expressed ambivalence to a radio show about participating if a partnership proposal was not included. Mario Dumont, leader of the new Action démocratique du Québec, also stated that he would only consider participation in the referendum if a partnership was made part of the question.

The final findings of the National Commission, issued April 19, included a statement that the public generally desired an economic partnership with Canada. Fearing Bouchard and Dumont would further dilute their position as the referendum wore on, Parizeau agreed to negotiate a broader approach, and would agree to a statement that included partnership with Dumont and Bouchard on June 12, 1995. The Agreement contained details of the partnership negotiation process, and a general plan of seeking "sovereignty" while requiring an economic and social partnership offer be negotiated and presented to the rest of Canada. Most importantly for Parizeau, the agreement also allowed the government to declare immediate independence if negotiations were not successful or heard after a successful referendum.

=== Bertrand v. Quebec ===
The looming referendum prompted a number of actions in the Quebec Superior Court, which were consolidated under the application of prominent lawyer Guy Bertrand. Bertrand asked for interim and permanent injunctions against the holding of the referendum. The Federal Attorney General declined to intervene, and after failing in a motion to strike the application, the Quebec Attorney General unilaterally withdrew from the hearing. The Quebec government moved the September sitting of the National Assembly two days forward to be sure that parliamentary immunity would prevent MNAs from being summoned to testify.

Justice Lesage of the Court found that secession could only legally be performed by constitutional amendment pursuant to Section V of the Constitution Act, 1982, and that a unilateral declaration of independence would be "manifestly illegal." Lesage refused to issue an injunction to stop the referendum, as he believed that to do so could paralyze the workings of government and cause more disorder than the referendum being held. The Court opted for declaratory relief, declaring that the Sovereignty Bill and the referendum constituted a serious threat to Bertrand's Charter rights. (Note: The Court specifically named Sections 2,3,6,7, 15, and 24(1) of the Charter. (Haljan, 303))

Parizeau denounced the decision as undemocratic, stated that the Constitution Act, 1982 did not apply to Quebec, and refused to move the referendum timetable. Quebec Attorney General Paul Bégin stated that he believed an extra-constitutional referendum was legal pursuant to international law. Quebec Liberal leader and "No" campaign chairman Daniel Johnson announced the following day that the ruling would not change the strategy of the "No" campaign. Some Federal officials questioned if their level of government could be involved after the declaration, but ultimately the Federal government decided to participate.

=== Referendum question ===
In a dramatic reading at the Grand Théâtre de Québec on September 6, the final version of the Sovereignty Bill was unveiled. The bill would be tabled in the National Assembly awaiting the result of the referendum.

The question in the 1980 referendum, in an attempt to build a broad coalition, had sought only the authority to negotiate sovereignty with the Canadian government, and promised a second referendum to ratify the results of any negotiation. Parizeau believed a second referendum was unnecessary and would only encourage the remainder of Canada to use delaying tactics. The draft initial act featured a question only asking for the authority to declare Quebec sovereign. (Note: Are you in favour of the Act passed by the National Assembly declaring the sovereignty of Quebec? (Draft Bill Respecting the Sovereignty of Quebec "Draft Bill on the Sovereignty of Quebec". Archived from the original on July 2, 2010.))

Pursuant to the partnership agreement with Bouchard and Dumont, the referendum question was changed to incorporate the partnership agreement. It was presented on September 7, 1995, to be voted on October 30, 1995. In English, the question on the ballot asked:

Do you agree that Quebec should become sovereign, after having made a formal offer to Canada for a new economic and political partnership, within the scope of the bill respecting the future of Quebec and of the agreement signed on June 12, 1995? (Note: In French :"Acceptez-vous que le Québec devienne souverain, après avoir offert formellement au Canada un nouveau partenariat économique et politique, dans le cadre du projet de loi sur l'avenir du Québec et de l'entente signée le 12 juin 1995?")

The question came under immediate fire from federalists, who had no input in the drafting. Daniel Johnson stated it was confusing and at the very least should have contained the word "country." Prominent federalists argued that the referendum question should not have mentioned "partnership" proposals, because no Canadian political leaders outside Quebec had shown any interest in negotiating a possible partnership agreement with an independent Quebec and were under no legal obligation to pursue any such agreement, and arguably no entity capable of undertaking such negotiations actually existed.

Other federalists argued that the question erroneously implied an agreement had been reached between Canada and Quebec regarding a partnership on June 12, 1995. Parizeau would later express regret that the agreement had to be cited in the question, but noted that the June 12, 1995 agreement had been sent to every registered voter in the province.

== Campaign ==
=== Participants ===
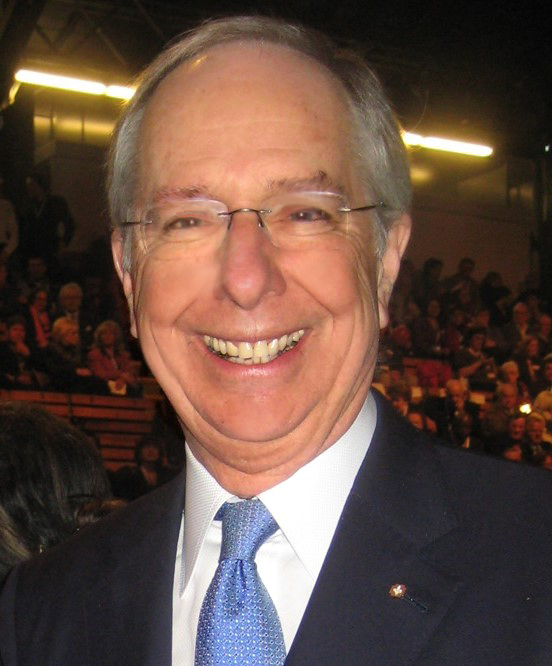
Daniel Johnson, Jr., leader of the "No" Committee

Pursuant to Quebec's Referendum Act (enacted by the National Assembly prior to the referendum of 1980), the campaign would be conducted as a provincially governed election campaign, and all campaign spending had to be authorized and accounted for under "Yes" (Le Comité national du OUI) or "No" (Comité des Québécoises et des Québécois pour le NON) umbrella committees. Each committee had an authorized budget of $5 million. Campaign spending by any person or group other than the official committees would be illegal after the official beginning of the referendum campaign.

After the agreement of June 12, the "Yes" campaign would be headed by Jacques Parizeau. The official "No" campaign would be chaired by Liberal leader Daniel Johnson Jr.

Making matters more complex, especially for the "No" camp, was the federal nature of Canada. The governing Liberal Party of Canada and its leader, Prime Minister Jean Chrétien were not strongly represented in the province outside of Montreal. Chrétien's involvement in the 1982 negotiations and his stance against the Meech Lake Accord made him unpopular with moderate francophone federalists and sovereignists, who would be the swing voters in the referendum. Lucienne Robillard, a nationalist former Bourassa-era cabinet minister, would serve as the federal Liberal representative on the "No" committee. Jean Charest, leader of the Federal Progressive Conservative Party, would be prominently featured, as he and the PCs had closely and productively cooperated with the Quebec Liberals in the Meech Lake negotiations.

Fearing missteps by politicians not used to Quebec that had occurred during the Meech Lake and Charlottetown debates, Johnson and the campaign heavily controlled appearances by Federal politicians, including Chrétien. Johnson bluntly banned any appearance by the Reform Party or its leader, Preston Manning. This would go unchallenged by Ottawa for the majority of the campaign, but created much frustration within the governing Liberals in Ottawa. Prominent Chrétien adviser Eddie Goldenberg believed that the "No" campaign at some points was more focused on the future election position of the Quebec Liberals rather than the referendum itself.

=== Early days ===
The campaign officially began on October 2, 1995, with a televised address by both leaders. Parizeau emphasized that he believed this might be the last opportunity for sovereignty for the foreseeable future, while Johnson chose to forecast the uncertainty that a "Yes" vote could provoke.

Johnson's campaign focused on the practical problems created by the sovereignty process, emphasizing that an independent Quebec would be in an uncertain position regarding the North American Free Trade Agreement (NAFTA) and not be able to control the Canadian dollar. Prominent business figures such as Power Corporation president Paul Desmarais and Bombardier Inc. head Laurent Beaudoin spoke that they believed a "Yes" victory could spell doom for their Quebec business interests.

The initial campaign for the "Yes" was led by Parizeau, with Dumont campaigning separately in rural areas. In addition to the traditional themes of the movement's appeal to Quebec nationalism, the "Yes" campaign attempted to highlight the slim possibility of any future reform to Canada's federal system. Parizeau bitterly attacked business leaders for intervening in the referendum, calling it a betrayal of their Quebec customers and workers. While Parizeau's responses were highly popular with "Yes" stalwarts, it was generally seen that speeches against business leaders were only highlighting the economic uncertainty that worried swing voters.

Polls in the first week were highly disappointing for the "Yes" camp, as they showed them behind by 5–7 percentage points among decided voters, with an even larger gap if "undecided" voters were weighed toward the "No" side as would generally be expected. Parizeau, a general fixture in Quebec politics for decades whose strong views of sovereignty were well known among the populace, was under pressure to create a spark.

=== Appointment of Bouchard ===
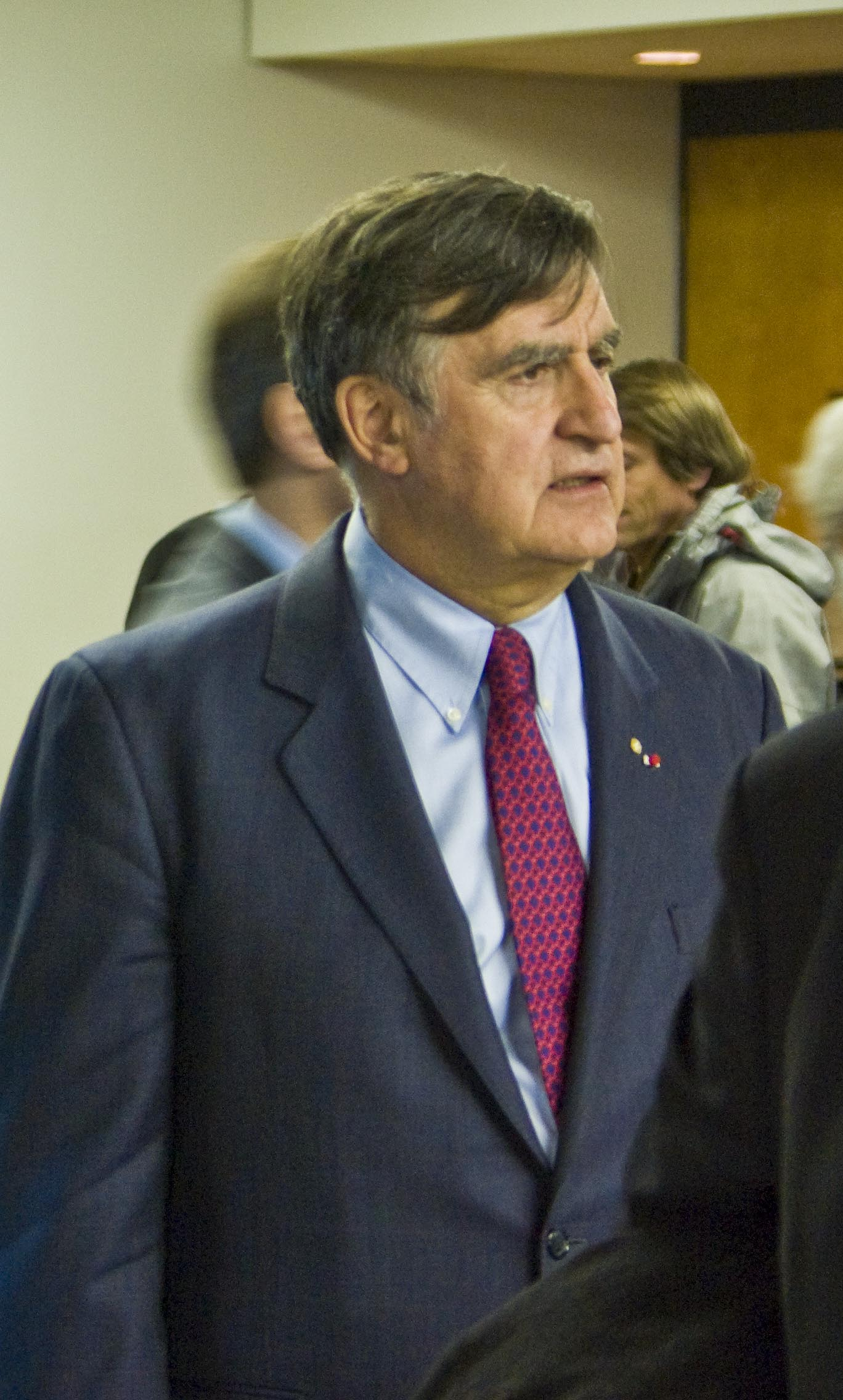
Lucien Bouchard, Federal Leader of the Opposition

In an unannounced ceremony on October 7 at the Université de Montréal, Parizeau made a surprise announcement: He appointed Bouchard as "chief negotiator" for the partnership talks following a "Yes" vote. The move came as a dramatic surprise to the campaign, promoting the popular Bouchard to the fore and simultaneously emphasizing the "partnership" aspect of the question.

Bouchard, already popular, became a sensation: in addition to his medical struggles and charisma, his more moderate approach and prominent involvement in the Meech Lake Accord while in Ottawa reminded undecided nationalist voters of federal missteps from years past. Politicians on both sides described his appeal as messianic and almost impossible to personally attack, in contrast to the well-worn figures on both sides of the referendum. "No" advisor John Parisella noted that at focus groups, when presented with statements Bouchard had made that they did not like, participants would refuse to believe he meant them. New polls eventually showed a majority of Quebecers intending to vote "Yes".

"No" forces, including Johnson, were shocked by the development, which required wholesale changes in strategy three weeks before the vote. Unwilling to believe Parizeau had given up his leadership role voluntarily, most in the "No" camp and Ottawa had assumed a coup had taken place, though the manoeuvre had been planned and voluntary. The dramatic events prompted many federal politicians to lobby for similarly dramatic intervention from Ottawa and the federal government, which were refused by the "No" committee, who believed that with Bouchard's introduction the margin for error was dramatically reduced. The "No" campaign continued to focus on the economic benefits of federation.

Bouchard's speeches asked Quebecers to vote "Yes" to give a clear mandate for change, and that only the clarity of a "Yes" vote would provide a final solution to Canada's long-standing constitutional issues and a new partnership with English Canada for the betterment of both. Bouchard's popularity was such that his remarks that the Québécois were the "white race" with the lowest rate of reproduction, which threatened to cast the project as focused on ethnic nationalism, were traversed with ease. Bloc Québécois MP Suzanne Tremblay was less successful in this regard, and apologized after answering journalist Joyce Napier's question of how minority francophones outside of Quebec would be helped by independence by stating that Napier's last name and lack of a Québécois accent made her ignorant of the subject.

=== Midcampaign ===
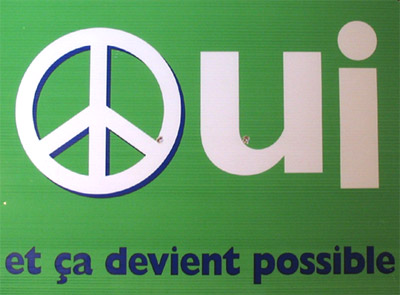
Election sign for the "Yes" side: "Yes – and this becomes possible". Other versions featured a loonie coin, a globe, a flower, ♀, and a "men working" traffic sign in place of the O.

Pursuant to the Referendum Act, both committees were required to contribute to a brochure sent to every voter describing their positions. The official "No" brochure, written by the Quebec Liberals, stated that Quebec was a distinct society, and that Quebec should enjoy full autonomy in areas of provincial jurisdiction. Parizeau, while speaking in Hull, challenged Chrétien to tell voters that, if "No" won, Ottawa would withdraw from all provincial jurisdictions, prompting a vague response from the "No" campaign.

On October 21 in Longueuil, Johnson, hoping to defuse the issue, ad-libbed a challenge to Chrétien to declare his position on distinct society recognition. When presented with the request, Chrétien, in New York for a United Nations meeting, responded, "No. We're not talking about the Constitution, we're talking about the separation of Quebec from the rest of Canada." The remarks in direct contradiction to Johnson were portrayed in the press as a blunt refusal.

Chrétien's position was far more difficult than Johnson's: part of the 1993 Liberal election platform had been moving the country away from large-scale constitutional debates. Provincial governments were also far more hostile to the constitutional process than they had been in the decade prior, with even the federal government's typical ally, Ontario, being firmly against any pursuit of constitutional accommodation.

French President Jacques Chirac, while answering a call from a viewer in Montreal on CNN's Larry King Live, said that, if the "Yes" side were successful, the fact that the referendum had succeeded would be recognized by France.

At a federalist rally of about 12,500 people which was held at the Verdun Auditorium on October 24, Chrétien introduced a focus on Quebec's emotional attachment to Canada, promised reforms to give Quebec more power, and in a more startling announcement, declared that he would support enshrinement of Quebec as a distinct society, and that he would support reforms to the Canadian constitution. The sudden reversal of Chrétien's long-standing position on the issue, along with Chrétien's wan complexion and atypically nervous appearance, sparked considerable comment. Charest further emphasized his commitment to constitutional reform if a "No" victory was achieved.

=== Indigenous activism ===
In response to the referendum, Indigenous peoples in Quebec strongly affirmed their own right to self-determination. First Nations chiefs said that forcing their peoples to join an independent Quebec without their consent would violate international law, violating their rights to self-determination. Indigenous groups also demanded to be full participants in any new constitutional negotiations resulting from the referendum. First Nations communities contributed significantly to the tense debate on a hypothetical partition of Quebec.

The Grand Council of the Crees in Northern Quebec was particularly vocal and prominent in its resistance to the idea of being included in an independent Quebec. Grand Chief Matthew Coon Come issued a legal paper, titled Sovereign Injustice, which sought to affirm the Cree right to self-determination in keeping their territories in Canada. On October 24, 1995, the Cree organized their own referendum, asking the question: "Do you consent, as a people, that the Government of Quebec separate the James Bay Crees and Cree traditional territory from Canada in the event of a Yes vote in the Quebec referendum?" 96.3% of the 77% of Crees who cast ballots voted to stay in Canada.

No/Non: 4,666 (96.3%)	Yes/Oui: 183 (3.7%)
▲

The Inuit of Nunavik held a similar local vote, asking voters, "Do you agree that Quebec should become sovereign?", with 96% voting No.

No/Non: 96%	Yes/Oui: 4%
▲

=== 25 October 1995: Three addresses ===
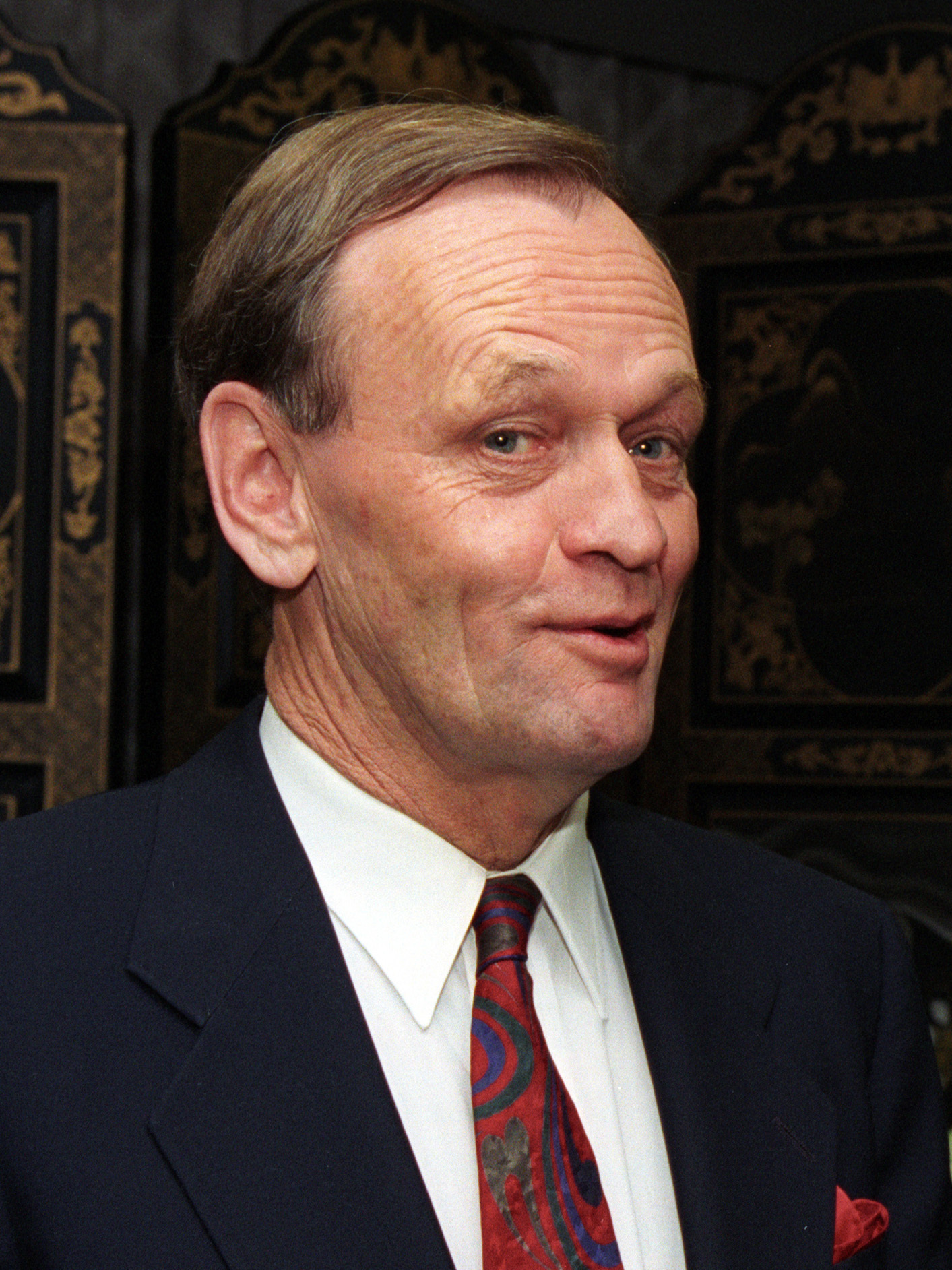
Jean Chrétien, then-Prime Minister of Canada

James J. Blanchard, the U.S. ambassador to Canada in 1993–1996, secretly opposed Quebec's separatist movement. Blanchard engineered a last-minute statement supporting a united Canada by President Bill Clinton. As a result, five days before the vote, Clinton, in response to a question asked by CBC News reporter Henry Champ, while recognizing the referendum as an internal issue of Canada, gave a minute-long statement extolling the virtues of a united Canada, ending with "Canada has been a great model for the rest of the world, and has been a great partner of the United States, and I hope that can continue." While the statement provided relief in sovereignist circles for not being a stronger endorsement of the "No" position, the implication of Clinton, who was popular in Quebec and the leader of the province's most important trading partner, endorsing Canadian unity had strong reverberations in the electorate.

The same night, Prime Minister Jean Chrétien gave a televised address to the nation in English and French. Broadly similar in both languages, Chrétien promoted the virtues of Canadian federalism to Quebec, touched on the shared values of the country, warned that Parizeau would use the referendum result as a mandate to declare independence from Canada (while explicitly not stating the result would be accepted), and announced that Quebec would be recognized as a distinct society and that any future constitutional reform that impacted Quebec would be made with the province's consent.

The "Yes" side was provided airtime for a rebuttal in English and French. Lucien Bouchard was given the task in both languages, with the "Yes" campaign stating that a federal politician should give the response. Bouchard's French address recounted the previous animosities of the constitutional debate, specifically targeting Chrétien's career and actions, including showing a newspaper headline from the aftermath of the 1982 Constitution that featured Trudeau and Chrétien laughing. Bouchard then focused on the details of the partnership aspect of the proposal. He used his English address to ask Canadians to understand the "Yes" side and to announce an intention to negotiate in good faith.

The next day, Montreal radio station CKOI broadcast a prank call by radio announcer Pierre Brassard, impersonating Chrétien, to Elizabeth II, Queen of Canada, asking her to make a televised address championing national unity. The Queen appeared to reluctantly agree to the request and talked to Brassard for 17 minutes before her staff identified the hoax (after a delay due to a Chrétien aide wrongly speculating to Buckingham Palace staff that it could be a genuine call).

=== Unity Rally ===
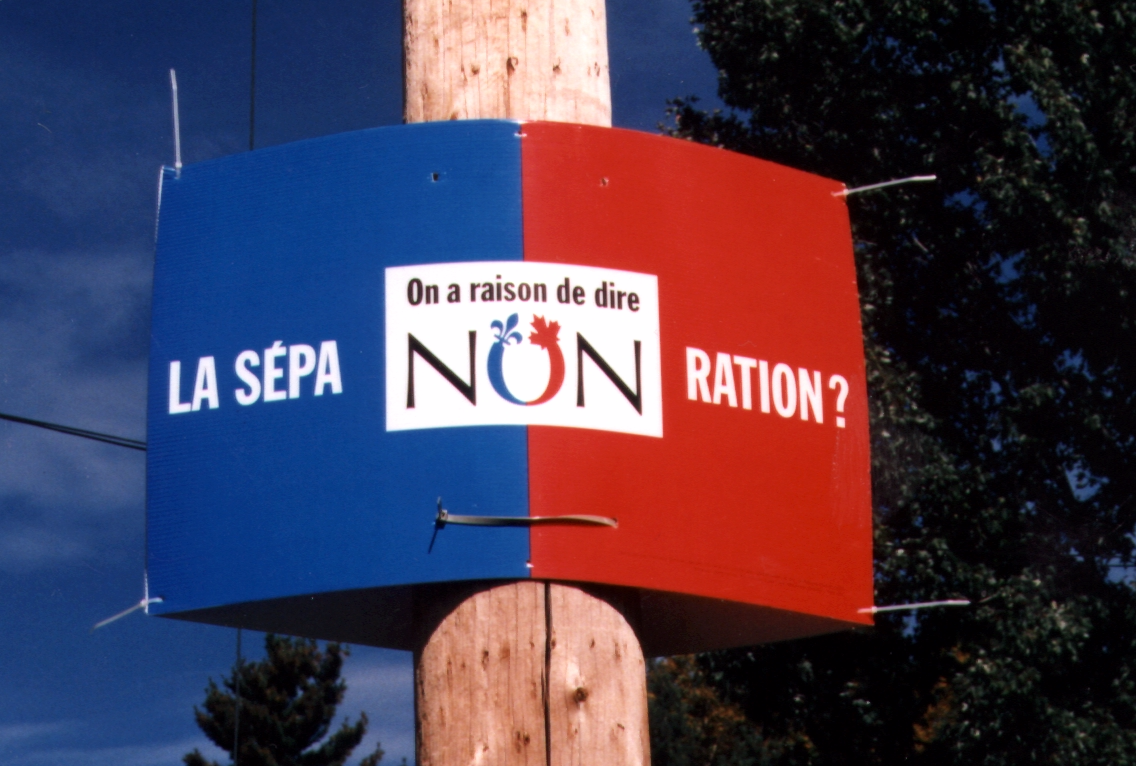
"Separation? We are right to say 'No'."

Fisheries Minister Brian Tobin, expressing anxiety to his staff about the referendum the week before, was told about a small rally planned in Place du Canada in Montreal for businesspersons on October 27. Asked by Federal advisor John Rae, Pierre Claude Nolin agreed to allow Tobin to invite Canadians outside Quebec to the rally, provided Quebec's referendum laws were adhered to. Tobin then encouraged fellow caucus members to send as many people as possible.

After gaining permission from the Prime Minister (over the objections of Quebec members of Cabinet), Tobin then appeared on the national English-language Canada AM, and while disavowing any connection with the "No" organization, announced that the "No" side would be holding a rally in Montreal on October 27, and implored Canadians from around the country to attend the rally to support the "crusade for Canada." Tobin noted that committees were being formed in Ottawa and Toronto, charter aircraft were being ordered, and that Canadian Airlines had a 90% off "unity" sale. Tobin proceeded to call the chairman of Air Canada in his capacity as a private citizen and suggest planes be made available at the same rate, a request that was granted.

Tobin's Canada AM appearance resulted in calls flooding MP's offices in English Canada, and bus companies volunteered hundreds of vehicles to take Canadians from outside of Quebec to Montreal. The rally at Place du Canada was estimated to have between 50,000 and 125,000 attendees, with estimates varying wildly as the crowd grew and shrank throughout the day. Jean Chrétien, Jean Charest and Daniel Johnson spoke to the crowd for the occasion, which would become known as the "Unity Rally". Images of the large crowd with an oversized Canadian flag became iconic. Charest felt the rally helped to keep momentum for the "No" campaign moving.

The federal government's intervention in the rally attracted strident protests from the "Yes" side, who felt the discounts and coordination were an illegal intervention in the referendum. Bouchard publicly contrasted the rally with what he believed was the inattention of English Canada to the collapse of the Meech Lake Accord. Nolin regretted granting permission for the "No" committee once the scale became known, and Johnson felt the rally only exacerbated tensions with regard to English Canada. Opinions on whether the rally had an impact were divided and unable to be gauged, as the rally happened while the final polls for the Monday referendum were being produced.

=== Opinion polling ===
During the campaign, polls were reported by all pollsters and press outlets with a general guideline of having undecided voters split unevenly in favour of the "No" side: This ranged from 2/3 to 3/4 of the undecided vote.

Completion Date	Polling organisation/client	Sample size	Yes	No	Undecided	Lead
30 October 1995	Official results	4,757,509	49.42%	50.58%		1.16%
Oct 27	Léger & Léger	1,003	47%	41%	12%	6%
Oct 27	Unity Rally held					
Oct 25	SOM	1,115	46%	40%	14%	6%
Oct 25	Angus Reid	1,029	48%	44%	8%	4%
Oct 25	Bouchard and Chrétien Television Addresses, Clinton Remarks					
Oct 23	CROP	1,072	44%	43%	13%	2%
Oct 20	Léger & Léger	1,005	46%	42%	12%	4%
Oct 18	Angus Reid	1,012	45%	44%	11%	1%
Oct 16	CROP	1,151	42%	44%	14%	2%
Oct 16	SOM	981	43%	43%	14%	0%
Oct 12	Léger & Léger	1,002	45%	42%	13%	3%
Oct 12	Gallup	1,013	39%	43%	18%	4%
Oct 11	Créatec	470	43%	49%	8%	6%
Oct 9	Lepage	1,285	45%	42%	13%	3%
Oct 7	Lucien Bouchard announced as Chief Negotiator for the Yes side					
Oct 4	Léger & Léger	1,015	43%	44%	13%	1%
Sep 29	Lepage	1,369	44%	46%	10%	2%
Sep 28	Léger & Léger	1,006	44%	45%	11%	1%
Sep 27	Angus Reid	1,000	41%	45%	14%	4%
Sep 25	SOM/Environics	1,820	39%	48%	13%	9%
Sep 25	CROP	2,020	39%	47%	14%	8%
Sep 25	Decima	750	40%	42%	18%	2%
Sep 19	Créatec	1,004	39%	46%	15%	7%
Sep 14	COMPAS	500	36%	40%	24%	4%
Sep 12	SOM	1,003	37%	45%	18%	8%
Sep 9	Léger & Léger	959	44%	43%	13%	1%
Sources: Polls & the 1995 Quebec Referendum, p.15

== Result ==
Map of the 1995 referendum by provincial riding. Ridings in Red voted "No", while ridings in blue voted "Yes". Despite having a lower vote total, many ridings were won by a plurality of Yes votes due to the geographic spread of voters. Many No votes were heavily concentrated in a few ridings, typically in urban regions.

93.52% of the 5,087,009 registered Quebecers voted in the referendum, a higher turnout than any provincial or federal election in Canada's history. The proposal of June 12, 1995 was rejected by voters, with 50.58% voting "No" and 49.42% voting "Yes". The margin was significantly smaller than the 1980 referendum. The "Yes" side was the choice of French speakers by an estimated majority of about 60%. Anglophones and allophones (those who do not have English or French as a first language) voted "No" by a margin of 95%.

There was a majority "Yes" vote in 80 out of 125 National Assembly ridings. The "Yes" side was strongest in Saguenay–Lac-Saint-Jean, the Gaspé, the Centre-du-Québec, and generally the suburbs of Quebec City and Montreal. While there was disappointment in the results of Montreal and the Beauce, Quebec City's soft support for "Yes" was the greatest surprise for the "Yes" side. This prompted speculation that provincial civil servants did not want the uncertainty a "Yes" would bring, especially after Parizeau had promised to integrate displaced Federal civil servants in a sovereign Quebec.

The largest support for the "No" vote was found in Montreal, the province's largest city; ridings in the West Island, home to a large anglophone population, voted "No" by margins eclipsing 80%, with some polling stations recording no "Yes" votes at all. The far North, the Outaouais, the Beauce, and the Eastern Townships also generally voted "No".

The riding with the highest "Yes" result was Saguenay along the northern shore with 73.3% voting yes; The riding with the highest "No" result was D'Arcy-McGee in western Montreal with 96.38% voting "No"; The riding with the closest result was Vimont in Laval, which the "Yes" won by 6 votes and the highest turnout was in Marguerite-D'Youville (96.52%).

Quebec referendum, 1995
Choice	Votes	%
For	2,308,360	49.42
Against	2,362,648	50.58
Total	4,671,008	100.00
Valid votes	4,671,008	98.18
Invalid/blank votes	86,501	1.82
Total votes	4,757,509	100.00
Registered voters/turnout	5,087,009	93.52

National referendum results (without spoiled ballots)
Oui/Yes: 2,308,360 (49.4%)	Non/No: 2,362,648 (50.6%)
▲

=== Results by National Assembly ridings ===
Results by constituency
Constituency	Electorate	Turnout (%)	Votes		Proportion of votes	
Constituency	Electorate	Turnout (%)	Yes	No	Yes	No
Abitibi-Est	31 906	90.72%	16,447	11,980	57.86%	42.14%
Abitibi-Ouest	32 698	90.12%	17,968	11,093	61.83%	38.17%
Acadie	44 886	94.56%	8,849	32,849	21.22%	78.78%
Anjou	33 374	94.86%	15,415	15,722	49.51%	50.49%
Argenteuil	46 327	93.60%	21,304	21,571	49.69%	50.31%
Arthabaska	43 237	92.91%	22,235	17,225	56.35%	43.65%
Beauce-Nord	31 514	91.96%	12,733	15,794	44.63%	55.37%
Beauce-Sud	40 413	91.10%	15,365	20,823	42.46%	57.54%
Beauharnois-Huntingdon	39 452	93.61%	16,821	19,527	46.28%	53.72%
Bellechasse	29 451	90.78%	12,425	13,927	47.15%	52.85%
Berthier	45 336	92.54%	25,986	15,249	63.02%	36.98%
Bertrand	40 267	92.90%	19,867	17,080	53.77%	46.23%
Blainville	39 126	95.33%	23,134	13,583	63.01%	36.99%
Bonaventure	29 496	91.80%	12,914	13,759	48.42%	51.58%
Borduas	34 433	95.59%	18,864	13,470	58.34%	41.66%
Bourassa	32 755	93.99%	13,063	17,084	43.33%	56.67%
Bourget	34 872	94.27%	17,258	14,857	53.74%	46.26%
Brome Missisquoi	37 691	93.91%	13,376	21,530	38.32%	61.68%
Chambly	48 794	96.16%	25,363	20,793	54.95%	45.05%
Champlain	43 788	93.66%	24,534	15,967	60.58%	39.42%
Chapleau	56 629	93.65%	14,354	37,788	27.53%	72.47%
Charlesbourg	47 083	94.79%	23,343	20,535	53.20%	46.80%
Charlevoix	31 047	90.53%	15,702	12,019	56.64%	43.36%
Châteauguay	41 172	95.57%	18,481	20,443	47.48%	52.52%
Chauveau	57 187	93.59%	28,574	23,855	54.50%	45.50%
Chicoutimi	46 325	92.64%	29,305	13,245	68.87%	31.13%
Chomedey	49 292	94.81%	11,311	29,998	27.38%	72.62%
Chutes-de-la-Chaudière	52 427	94.56%	29,456	19,587	60.06%	39.94%
Crémazie	38 149	94.57%	17,120	18,141	48.55%	51.45%
D'Arcy-McGee	41 690	94.50%	1,401	37,253	3.62%	96.38%
Deux-Montagnes	54 513	94.80%	29,831	20,780	58.94%	41.06%
Drummond	47 292	92.79%	24,866	18,267	57.65%	42.35%
Dubuc	35 463	92.61%	22,850	9,653	70.30%	29.70%
Duplessis	37 107	90.20%	20,781	12,322	62.78%	37.22%
Fabre	48 813	96.07%	23,651	22,341	51.42%	48.58%
Frontenac	34 719	93.51%	17,041	15,102	53.02%	46.98%
Gaspé	29 414	89.64%	15,186	10,771	58.50%	41.50%
Gatineau	38 948	93.40%	10,774	25,254	29.90%	70.10%
Gouin	41 901	92.21%	21,854	15,977	57.77%	42.23%
Groulx	41 806	95.20%	22,133	16,879	56.73%	43.27%
Hochelaga-Maisonneuve	31 881	90.79%	18,522	9,759	65.49%	34.51%
Hull	44 984	92.72%	12,394	28,553	30.27%	69.73%
Iberville	45 229	93.90%	23,400	18,178	56.28%	43.72%
Îles-de-la-Madeleine	10 415	91.76%	5,478	3,946	58.13%	41.87%
Jacques-Cartier	47 072	95.84%	4,016	40,689	8.98%	91.02%
Jeanne-Mance	37 801	94.62%	8,654	26,395	24.69%	75.31%
Jean-Talon	33 233	95.01%	14,921	16,159	48.01%	51.99%
Johnson	35 096	93.22%	17,507	14,672	54.41%	45.59%
Joliette	42 797	93.60%	25,099	14,190	63.88%	36.12%
Jonquiere	43 444	93.62%	28,385	11,584	71.02%	28.98%
Kamouraska-Temiscouata	34 066	88.47%	15,632	14,055	52.66%	47.34%
Labelle	36 470	91.52%	21,178	11,687	64.44%	35.56%
Lac-Saint-Jean	38 420	93.03%	25,857	9,534	73.06%	26.94%
LaFontaine	47 606	94.36%	17,780	26,373	40.27%	59.73%
La Peltrie	51 387	95.59%	26,426	21,844	54.75%	45.25%
La Pinière	44 702	95.38%	13,996	28,261	33.12%	66.88%
Laporte	45 729	94.87%	17,447	25,140	40.97%	59.03%
La Prairie	52 873	95.65%	29,947	19,919	60.05%	39.95%
L'Assomption	48 336	95.60%	29,095	16,614	63.65%	36.35%
Laurier-Dorion	45 569	94.00%	15,372	25,924	37.22%	62.78%
Laval-des-Rapides	39 120	94.46%	19,057	17,142	52.65%	47.35%
Laviolette	33 439	92.13%	17,177	13,093	56.75%	43.25%
Lévis	38 175	93.96%	19,917	15,311	56.54%	43.46%
Limoilou	45 311	91.71%	21,109	19,566	51.90%	48.10%
Lotbinière	28 974	92.89%	13,263	13,209	50.10%	49.90%
Louis-Hébert	41 061	94.28%	20,292	17,990	53.01%	46.99%
Marguerite-Bourgeoys	41 691	95.63%	10,339	27,335	27.44%	72.56%
Marguerite-D'Youville	42 469	96.52%	23,778	16,520	59.01%	40.99%
Marie-Victorin	41 530	93.14%	22,731	14,814	60.54%	39.46%
Marquette	37 872	94.63%	13,628	21,729	38.54%	61.40%
Maskinongé	43 220	92.77%	22,502	16,925	57.07%	42.93%
Masson	43 331	94.93%	28,636	11,683	71.02%	28.98%
Matane	28 314	89.44%	15,611	9,381	62.46%	37.54%
Matapédia	30 312	89.93%	17,292	9,600	64.30%	35.70%
Mégantic-Compton	30 369	92.09%	13,042	14,535	47.29%	52.71%
Mercier	42 596	94.06%	24,688	14,644	62.77%	37.23%
Mille-Îles	46 800	95.54%	22,660	21,220	51.64%	48.36%
Montmagny-L'Islet	31 816	88.31%	12,360	15,173	44.89%	55.11%
Montmorency	53 331	93.76%	28,360	20,914	57.56%	42.44%
Mont-Royal	40 794	93.77%	5,030	32,333	13.46%	86.54%
Nelligan	55 030	95.79%	9,443	42,494	18.18%	81.82%
Nicolet-Yamaska	32 705	93.57%	17,022	13,103	56.50%	43.50%
Notre-Dame-de-Grâce	38 962	95.07%	4,855	31,306	13.43%	86.57%
Orford	47 430	93.98%	20,773	23,132	47.31%	52.69%
Outremont	42 408	93.65%	13,428	25,619	34.39%	65.61%
Papineau	36 555	93.48%	12,371	21,517	36.51%	63.49%
Pointe-aux-Trembles	37 929	94.23%	21,425	13,768	60.88%	39.12%
Pontiac	37 247	95.47%	4,485	30,632	12.77%	87.23%
Portneuf	39 129	92.66%	19,303	16,235	54.32%	45.68%
Prévost	45 809	92.74%	26,180	15,432	62.91%	37.09%
Richelieu	39 395	93.26%	22,490	13,597	62.32%	37.68%
Richmond	31 984	93.57%	15,719	13,856	53.15%	46.85%
Rimouski	38 748	90.98%	22,289	12,684	63.73%	36.27%
Rivière-du-Loup	29 879	90.62%	14,561	12,114	54.59%	45.41%
Robert-Baldwin	45 929	95.48%	4,410	38,956	10.17%	89.83%
Roberval	42 650	91.30%	25,194	13,441	65.21%	34.79%
Rosemont	38 244	93.31%	18,723	16,213	53.59%	46.41%
Rousseau	41 861	92.09%	24,237	13,679	63.92%	36.08%
Rouyn-Noranda—Témiscamingue	41 718	91.84%	20,553	17,250	54.37%	45.63%
Saguenay	35 493	90.34%	23,067	8,389	73.33%	26.67%
Saint-François	42 140	93.21%	19,314	19,193	50.16%	49.84%
Saint-Henri—Sainte-Anne	40 379	92.60%	17,097	19,380	46.87%	53.13%
Saint-Hyacinthe	45 183	93.35%	22,952	18,552	55.30%	44.70%
Saint-Jean	48 991	94.65%	25,554	19,967	56.14%	43.86%
Saint-Laurent	45 542	94.50%	7,214	34,856	17.15%	82.85%
Sainte-Marie—Saint-Jacques	45 963	90.73%	23,879	16,838	58.65%	41.35%
Saint-Maurice	34 674	93.42%	17,779	13,973	55.99%	44.01%
Salaberry-Soulanges	49 423	94.27%	26,068	19,614	57.06%	42.94%
Sauvé	32 379	92.45%	11,870	17,358	40.61%	59.39%
Shefford	49 998	93.21%	23,986	21,782	52.41%	47.59%
Sherbrooke	40 413	93.77%	19,826	17,384	53.28%	46.72%
Taillon	50 766	94.24%	28,604	18,360	60.91%	39.09%
Taschereau	32 688	91.46%	17,358	12,038	59.05%	40.95%
Terrebonne	41 606	95.01%	26,046	12,655	67.30%	32.70%
Trois-Rivières	38 171	92.94%	19,328	15,411	55.64%	44.36%
Ungava	23 512	84.64%	9,187	10,396	46.91%	53.09%
Vachon	40 467	95.22%	21,374	16,284	56.76%	43.24%
Vanier	49 502	93.56%	25,119	20,353	55.24%	44.76%
Vaudreuil	50 883	95.69%	18,856	29,204	39.23%	60.77%
Verchères	36 193	94.82%	22,483	11,138	66.87%	33.13%
Verdun	43 851	93.54%	16,269	24,062	40.34%	59.66%
Viau	37 768	93.01%	10,746	23,701	31.20%	68.80%
Viger	36 731	94.89%	10,982	23,209	32.12%	67.88%
Vimont	52 092	95.85%	24,548	24,542	50.01%	49.99%
Westmount—Saint-Louis	50 161	91.55%	6,880	38,295	15.23%	84.77%
Total			809,728	818,842	49.4%	50.6%

== Immediate responses ==
"No" supporters gathered at Métropolis in Montreal, where Johnson expressed hope for reconciliation in Quebec and stated he expected the federal government to pursue constitutional changes. Prime Minister Chrétien echoed similar sentiments to Johnson, and stated that he "extended his hand" to Quebec's premier and government.

"Yes" supporters met at the Palais des congrès de Montréal on referendum night. After the result became known, Dumont and Bouchard made speeches accepting the result as part of the movement's democratic convictions and expressing hope that a subsequent referendum would bring a "Yes" victory.

Jacques Parizeau, who had not prepared a concession speech, rejected one prepared by Jean-François Lisée and spoke without notes. Noting that 60% of French-speakers had voted yes, he stated that he would address French-speaking Québécois as nous ("we"), and that they had spoken clearly in favour of the "Yes." He then stated that the only thing that had stopped the "Yes" side was "money and ethnic votes" (l'argent pis des votes ethniques) and that the next referendum would be successful with only a few more percentage points of French speakers onside. The remarks, widely lambasted in the Canadian and international press as ethnocentric, sparked surprise and anger in the "Yes" camp, as the movement had gone to great lengths to disown ethnic nationalism.

Bernard Landry confronted Parizeau at a Cabinet meeting the next morning about the remarks, stating that the movement "had to hide its head in shame." Parizeau, after canvassing opinions, then told his Cabinet that he would resign as premier and leader of the Parti Québécois. It was later revealed that he had declared he would retire anyway if the "Yes" side lost, in an embargoed interview with TVA taped days before the referendum.

Six days after the referendum, André Dallaire, a "Yes" supporter with schizophrenia, upset at the result, broke into Chrétien's Ottawa residence armed with a knife. Dallaire attempted to find Chrétien and kill the prime minister in his bed before being discovered by Aline Chrétien, who barricaded the bedroom door. Chrétien was unharmed, and Dallaire was eventually found not criminally responsible by reason of mental defect.

== Contingency preparation for a "Yes" victory ==
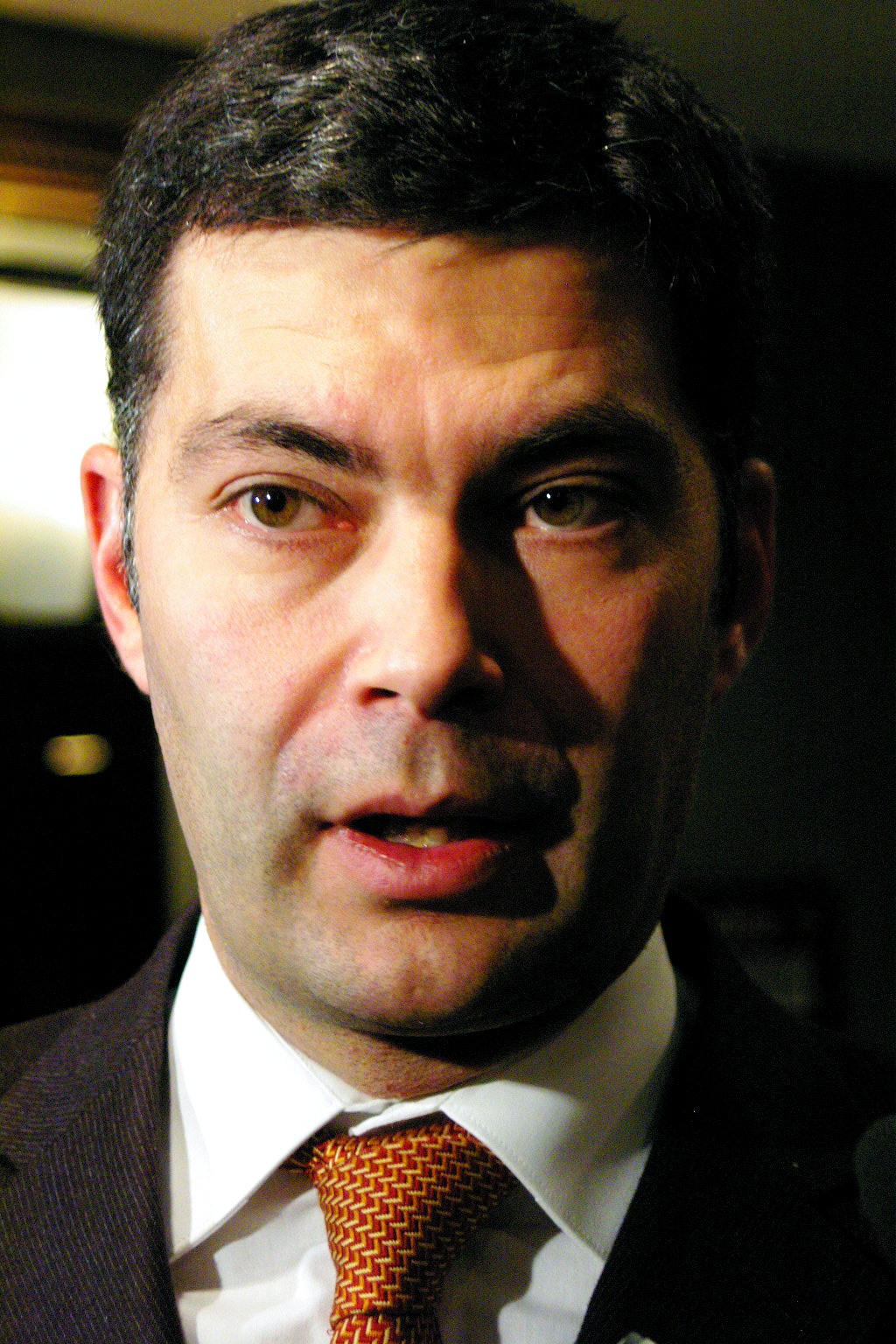
Mario Dumont, leader of the ADQ and member of the "Yes" side.

=== Sovereignists ===
Sovereignists believed that a "Yes" vote of 50% plus one vote was a binding result pursuant to the Referendum Act and the Sovereignty Bill, as well as the general international law principle of self-determination. In the event of a "Yes" victory, Parizeau had said he intended to return to the National Assembly of Quebec within two days of the result and seek support for a motion recognizing the result of the referendum. In a speech he had prepared in the event of a "Yes" victory, he said a sovereign Quebec's first move would be to "extend a hand to its Canadian neighbour" in partnership pursuant to the wording of the referendum.

Parizeau's immediate plans after the referendum relied upon what he felt would be general pressure from economic markets and the business community in English Canada to stabilize the situation as quickly as possible, which he believed would mitigate any catastrophic initial events (such as blockades) and prepare for negotiations.

Despite the prominent placement of Bouchard in the referendum campaign, Parizeau planned to retain all authority with regard to negotiations, and to appoint most members of the negotiation team if they were to occur. Parizeau also believed federalist Quebecers such as Chrétien and Charest would be quickly disregarded and replaced at negotiations by representatives from the other nine provinces. If the Federal government refused to negotiate, or if negotiations were to exceed October 30, 1996, Parizeau stated that he would proceed with a unilateral declaration of independence (UDI) for an independent Quebec pursuant to Section 26 of the Sovereignty Bill.

Parizeau's hopes for international recognition, a practical requirement of statehood, rested with France and the Francophonie. He believed that if Quebec declared independence in these circumstances, President of the French National Assembly Philippe Séguin, a powerful Gaullist power broker who was sympathetic to the sovereignty movement, would pressure President Chirac to recognize the declaration. He counted on a French recognition to spread quickly to the Francophonie and bring the issue to a head. Benoit Bouchard, Canada's ambassador at the time, believed that the plan was irrational as he doubted Séguin, who was supposed to be a neutral figure in his role, could bring sufficient pressure in the country's semi-presidential system.

In interviews conducted in 2014, Bouchard and Dumont both believed that negotiations would have resulted had the "Yes" side won and that Quebec would have remained in Canada with a more autonomous status. Bouchard, while approving of Parizeau's intention to unilaterally declare independence should negotiations be refused, implied that he and Dumont would have been able to control negotiations and offer a subsequent referendum on a new agreement. Dumont noted that international recognition would have been difficult had two of the three leaders of the "Yes" campaign been against a UDI, and that he and Bouchard were willing to slow the process down if necessary. For his part, Bernard Landry believed that nothing short of a seat at the United Nations would have been accomplished had the "Yes" won.

=== Federalists ===
==== Recognition ====
As the referendum was only of force and effect pursuant to a provincial law, neither the provincially sanctioned "No" committee nor the Federal government had any input on the question of the referendum. Federalists strongly differed on how or if a "Yes" referendum result would be recognized. "No" campaign head Daniel Johnson disputed the "Yes" side's position that a simple majority was sufficient to declare independence, as he believed the question was too vague and gave negotiators too broad a mandate given the enormity of the issue and the uncertainty of negotiations.

Jean Chrétien refused to publicly comment or consider contingencies regarding a possible "Yes" victory, and at no point stated the referendum bound the Federal government to negotiations or permitted a unilateral declaration of independence. His wording of speeches during the referendum noted that Parizeau would interpret a "Yes" vote as a mandate to separate Quebec from Canada, but never offered recognition that this was legal or recognizable. A speech drafted for Chrétien in the event of a "Yes" vote stated that the question was too ambiguous to be binding and that only dissatisfaction with the status quo had been stated.

Reform party leader Preston Manning, a prominent proponent of direct democracy, would have recognized any result, with critics suspecting he preferred a "Yes" vote for electoral gain. Jean Charest recognized the referendum's legitimacy, although a draft post-referendum speech had him interpreting a "Yes" vote as a call for drastic reform of Canadian federation instead of separation. The New Democratic Party's official position was that the result had to be recognized.

==== Negotiations ====
Little planning was made for the possibility of a "Yes" vote by the Canadian federal government, with the general consensus being that the referendum would be easily won and that planning would spark panic or give the referendum undeserved legitimacy. Some members of the federal cabinet met to discuss several possible scenarios, including referring the issue of Quebec's independence to the Supreme Court. Senior civil servants met to consider the impact of a vote for secession on issues such as territorial boundaries and the federal debt. A dispute arose as to whether Jean Chrétien and many prominent members of Cabinet who had been elected in Quebec ridings could represent Canada at a hypothetical partnership negotiation.

Manning intended to immediately call for Chrétien's resignation and for a general election if the referendum were successful, even though the Liberals, independently of their Quebec seats, had a sizable majority in the House of Commons. There was also some doubt that Chrétien would be able to assure the governor general that he retained enough support within his party to remain the prime minister. Chrétien's intention was, whatever the result, to stay in office. New Brunswick Premier Frank McKenna later confirmed that he had been invited into a hypothetical "national unity" cabinet if the "Yes" side was victorious, with a general understanding that former Ontario Premier Bob Rae was to be included as well.

Premier of Saskatchewan Roy Romanow secretly formed a committee to study consequences if Quebec successfully seceded, including strengthening Saskatchewan's relationships with other western provinces, also seceding from Canada, or joining the United States.

== Controversies post-referendum ==
=== Rejected ballots ===
When the counting was completed, approximately 86,000 ballots were rejected by Deputy Returning Officers, alleging that they had not been marked properly by the voter. Each polling station featured a Deputy Returning Officer (appointed by the "Yes") who counted the ballots while a Poll Clerk (appointed by the "No") recorded the result of the count.

Controversy arose over whether the Deputy Returning Officers of the Chomedey, Marguerite-Bourgeois and Laurier-Dorion ridings had improperly rejected ballots. In these ridings the "No" vote was dominant, and the proportion of rejected ballots was 12%, 5.5% and 3.6%. Thomas Mulcair, member of the Quebec National Assembly for Chomedey, told reporters that there was "an orchestrated attempt to steal the vote" in his riding. A study released months after the referendum by McGill University concluded that ridings with a greater number of "No" votes had a higher percentage of rejected ballots. Directeur général des élections du Québec (DGEQ), Pierre F. Cote, launched an inquiry into the alleged irregularities, supervised by the Chief Justice of the Quebec Superior Court, Alan B. Gold. All ballots of the three ridings plus a sample of ballots from other ridings were examined. The inquiry concluded that some ballots had been rejected without valid reasons, but the incidents were isolated. The majority of the rejected ballots were "No" votes, in proportion to the majority of the valid votes in those districts.

Two Deputy Returning Officers were charged by the DGEQ with violating elections laws, but in 1996 were found not guilty (a decision upheld by the Quebec Court of Appeal), after it was found that the ballots were not rejected in a fraudulent or irregular manner, and that there was no proof of conspiracy. A Quebec Court judge acquitted a Deputy Returning Officer charged with illegally rejecting 53% of the ballots cast at his Chomedey polling district.

In 2000, the Quebec Superior Court denied an application by Alliance Quebec that attempted to force the DGEQ to give access to all 5 million ballots, ruling that the only authority that could do so expired in 1996. The referendum ballots were shredded and recycled in 2008 after appeals were exhausted. In May 2005, former PQ Cabinet minister Richard Le Hir said that the PQ coordinated the ballot rejections, which PQ officials denied.

=== Citizenship and Immigration Canada ===
Citizenship Court judges from across Canada were sent into the province to ensure as many qualified immigrants living in Quebec as possible had Canadian citizenship before the referendum, and thus were able to vote. The goal was to have 10,000 to 20,000 outstanding citizenship applications processed for residents of Quebec by mid-October. 43,855 new Quebecers obtained their Canadian citizenship during 1995, with about one quarter of these (11,429) being granted during the month of October. When confronted about the issue by a Bloc Québécois MP who suggested shortcuts were being taken to hurry citizenship applications for immigrants who would most likely vote "No", Minister of Citizenship and Immigration Sergio Marchi responded that this was common before provincial election campaigns in other provinces. Marchi would later admit that citizenship applications were hurried on Chrétien's direct orders to sway the vote to the "No" side.

=== Spending limits and Option Canada ===
The Canadian Unity Council incorporated a Montreal-based lobbying group called Option Canada with the mandate to promote federalism in Quebec. Option Canada received $1.6 million in funding from the Canadian Heritage Department in 1994, $3.35 million in 1995 and $1.1 million in 1996. The Montreal Gazette reported in March 1997 that the group also had other funds from undeclared sources. A Committee to Register Voters Outside Quebec was created to help citizens who had left Quebec before the 1995 vote register on the electoral list. The Committee handed out pamphlets during the referendum, including a form to be added to the list of voters. The pamphlet gave out a toll-free number as contact information, which was the same number as the one used by the Canadian Unity Council.

After the referendum, the DSEQ filed 20 criminal charges of illegal expenditures by Option Canada and others on behalf of the "No" side, which were dropped after the Supreme Court of Canada in Libman vs. Quebec-Attorney General ruled sections of the Referendum Act restricting third-party expenditures were unconstitutionally restrictive under the Canadian Charter of Rights and Freedoms.

Aurèle Gervais, communications director for the Liberal Party of Canada, as well as the students' association at Ottawa's Algonquin College, were charged with infractions of Quebec's Election Act after the referendum for illegally hiring buses to bring supporters to Montreal for the rally. Environment Minister Sergio Marchi told reporters that Gervais should wear [the charges against him] like a badge of honour." Two years later, the Quebec Superior Court dismissed the charges, stating that the actions took place outside of Quebec and so the Quebec Election Act did not apply.

The DSEQ asked retired Quebec court judge Bernard Grenier in 2006 to investigate Option Canada after the publication of Normand Lester and Robin Philpot's "The Secrets of Option Canada", which alleged over $5,000,000 had been spent helping the "No" campaign. Grenier determined that CA$539,000 was illegally spent by the "No" side during the referendum, although he drew no conclusions over the "Unity Rally." Grenier said there was no evidence of wrongdoing by Jean Charest or that the rally was part of a plan to sabotage the sovereigntist movement. Grenier urged Quebecers in his report to move on. The Bloc Québécois called for a federal inquiry, which did not occur.

=== Responses ===
After the referendum, the ballot for Quebec elections was redesigned to reduce the size of the space where voters could indicate their choice and the rules on allowable markings were relaxed, so that Deputy Returning Officers would have fewer grounds for rejecting ballots. The Quebec government also changed the Electoral Act so that voters would need to show a Canadian passport, Quebec driver's licence or Quebec provincial health care card at the polling station for identification purposes in future elections.

== Aftermath ==
=== Quebec ===
Parizeau's resignation led to Bouchard becoming the leader of the PQ and premier unopposed. While Bouchard maintained a third referendum was forthcoming provided "winning conditions" occurred, his government's chief priority became reform of the Quebec economy. Daniel Johnson would resign as leader of the Liberal Party of Quebec, and after significant pressure in English Canada, Charest resigned as national PC leader and was acclaimed as leader of the Quebec Liberals.

Observers expected Bouchard to announce another sovereignty referendum if his party won the 1998 Quebec general election. While he defeated Charest, Bouchard continued his government's focus on Quebec's economy. Bouchard retired in 2001 and was replaced by Bernard Landry who, despite promising a more robust stance on the sovereignty issue, was ousted in the 2003 Quebec general election by Charest, who would become premier.

=== Distinct society and veto ===
After the referendum, Chrétien attempted to pursue constitutional recognition of distinct society, but was stopped by the blunt refusal of Ontario Premier Mike Harris to discuss any constitutional matters due to his perception they had dominated the country's debates for too long. Given the impossibility of any meaningful change without Ontario's approval, Chrétien opted to pursue unilateral federal changes to fulfill his government's referendum commitments. This included legislation which required permission from the provinces of Quebec, Ontario and British Columbia for federal approval to be granted to any constitutional amendment, granting Quebec a de facto veto. The Federal parliament also officially recognized Quebec as a distinct society. Both changes, not being constitutional amendments, are theoretically reversible by future parliaments.

=== "Plan B" ===
Chrétien also pursued what he called "Plan B" in hopes of convincing Quebec voters that economic and legal obstacles would follow if Quebec were to declare itself sovereign; its public face would become professor Stéphane Dion. This included a reference to the Supreme Court of Canada, which followed Federal intervention post-referendum into the Bertrand case: The 1998 Reference Re Secession of Quebec stated that unilateral secession was illegal, would require a constitutional amendment, and that only a clear majority on a clear question could bring about any sort of obligation on the federal and provincial governments to negotiate secession.

After the decision, the Liberal government passed the Clarity Act, which stated that any future referendum would have to be on a "clear question" and that it would have to represent a "clear majority" for the federal Parliament to recognize its validity. Section 1(4) of the act stated that questions that provided for only a mandate for negotiation or envisioned other partnerships with Canada would be considered unclear, and thus not recognized. The National Assembly of Quebec passed Bill 99, proclaiming the right of self-determination and the right of the National Assembly to set referendum questions pursuant to the Referendum Act and to declare the winning majority in a referendum as a simple majority of 50% plus 1 vote. Bill 99's constitutionality was litigated for 25 years, until the Quebec Court of Appeal ruled in 2021 that the law, given its general wording, was constitutional when applied within provincial jurisdiction.

=== Sponsorship scandal ===
Following the narrow victory, the Chrétien government established a Federal government-funded advertising campaign to promote national symbols and sponsor hunting, fishing and other recreational events to promote Canada within Quebec. The campaign to promote use of the Canadian flag generally prompted apathy and annoyance with the electorate, while it was revealed in an Auditor General's report of November 2003 that the sponsorship program saw a large sum of money mismanaged and sent to politically connected firms for little or no work. This eventually led to the Gomery Commission's investigation of the Sponsorship Scandal.

== See also ==
- 1980 Quebec referendum
- Quebec sovereignty movement
- Quebec federalist ideology
- Quebec nationalism
- National Question (Quebec)
- Politics of Quebec
- History of Quebec
- Similar referendums:
  - 2014 Scottish independence referendum
  - 2017 Catalan independence referendum
  - 2026 Alberta independence referendum

== Works cited and further reading ==
- Argyle, Ray (2004). Turning Points: The Campaigns that Changed Canada 2004 and Before. Toronto: White Knight Publications. ISBN 978-0-9734186-6-8. pp. 429–474
- Cardinal, Mario (2005). Breaking Point: Quebec, Canada, The 1995 Referendum. Montreal: Bayard Canada Books. ISBN 2-89579-068-X.
- Chrétien, Jean (2007). My Years as Prime Minister. Toronto: Vintage Canada. ISBN 978-0-676-97901-5.
- CBC documentary Breaking Point (2005)
- Robin Philpot (2005). Le Référendum volé. Montreal: Les éditions des intouchables. ISBN 2-89549-189-5.
- Haljan, David (2014). Constitutionalising Secession. Portland: Bloomsbury Publishing. ISBN 9781782253303.
- Hébert, Chantal (With Jean Lapierre) (2014). The Morning After: The 1995 Referendum and the Day that Almost Was. Toronto: Alfred A Knopf Canada. ISBN 978-0-345-80762-5.
- Paul Jay documentary Neverendum Referendum
- Fox, John; Andersen, Robert; Dubonnet, Joseph (1999). "The Polls and the 1995 Quebec Referendum". Canadian Journal of Sociology. 24 (3): 411–424. doi:10.2307/3341396. JSTOR 3341396.
