= Committee to Register Voters Outside Quebec =

The Committee to Register Voters Outside Quebec was created to help citizens who had left Quebec in the two years before the 1995 referendum to register on the electoral list.

Quebec lawyer Casper Bloom, chairman of the committee, and Liberal MNA Lawrence Bergman worked together to "make all eligible voters outside Quebec aware of their rights, to have them register and finally vote" said the pamphlet.

Since 1989, a clause of the Quebec electoral law allows for ex-residents of Quebec to signal, in writing, their intention of returning to Quebec and vote by mail. The committee, which operated during the referendum campaign, handed-out pamphlets including the form to be added to the list of voters by the Directeur général des élections du Québec.

The pamphlet gave out a toll-free number as contact information which was the same number as the one used by the Canadian Unity Council.

== See also ==
- Canadian Unity Council
- 1995 Quebec referendum
- Politics of Quebec
- Politics of Canada

== Sources ==
- Macpherson, Don. (August 22, 1995), "Vote-hunting Bid to lure outside voters not a formula for stability", The Gazette, (Montreal).
