= Macdonald Monument =

Former monument in Montreal

- Monument à Sir John A. Macdonald
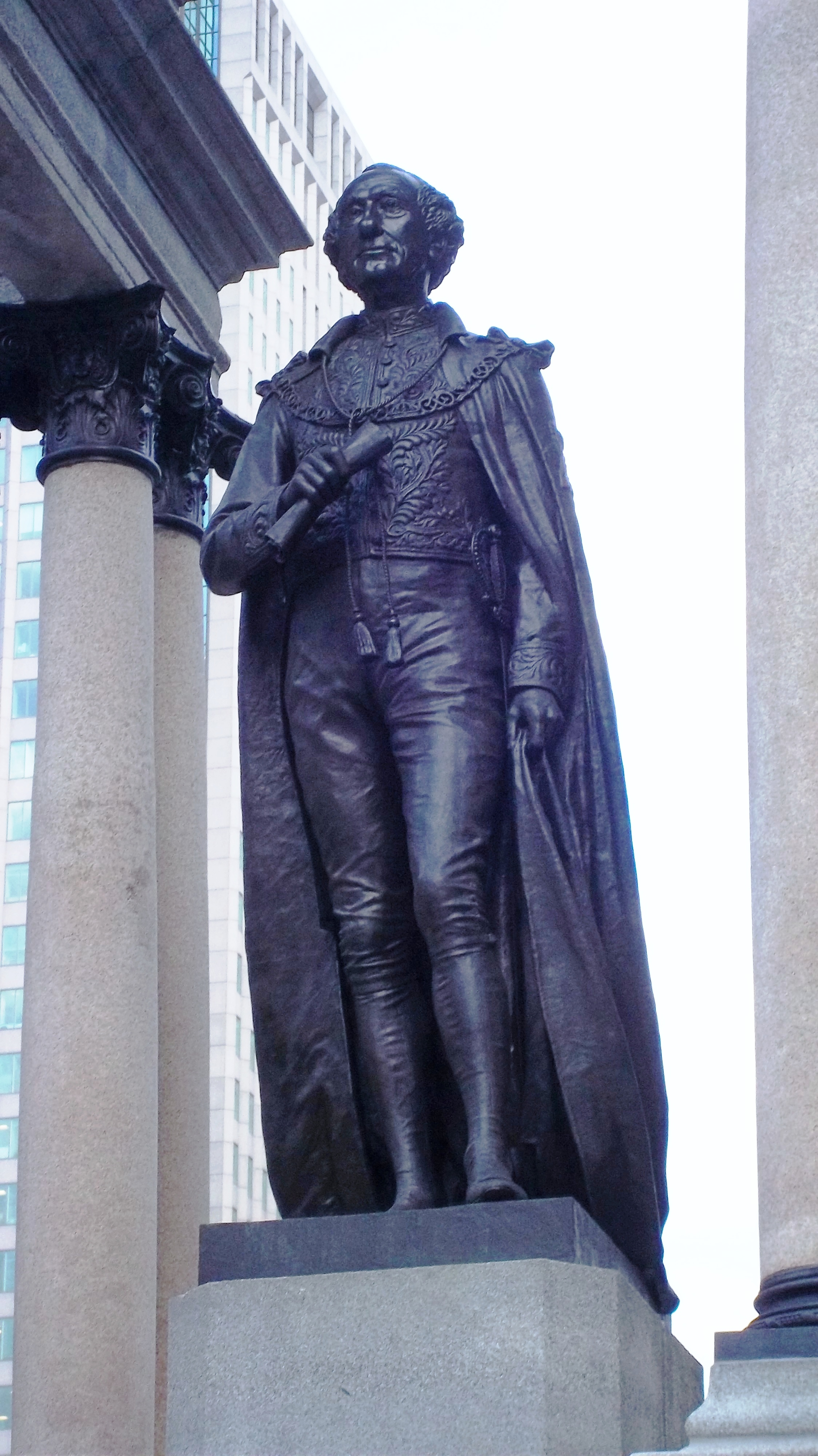
- The monument as it appeared in 2011
- Interactive map of Macdonald Monument
- Location: Montreal, Quebec, Canada
- Coordinates: 45°29′55.5864″N 73°34′10.578″W
- Designer: George Edward Wade
- Material: bronze, stone
- Opening date: 6 June 1895
- Dedicated to: John A. Macdonald

The Macdonald Monument (French: Monument à Sir John A. Macdonald) is a monument to John A. Macdonald, first Prime Minister of Canada, by sculptor George Edward Wade (1853–1933), located at Place du Canada in Montreal, Quebec, Canada.

The statue in the monument was toppled and decapitated on 29 August 2020 during the George Floyd protest in Montreal, and has been vacant since. As of 2026, Montreal municipal government has decided to not reinstate the statue.

== Work ==
At the top, an allegorical female figure carrying a horn of plenty represents Canada. Below, the children symbolize the seven provinces that made up Canada at the time. The bronze is housed under a stone baldachin replete with copper bas reliefs of industrial and agricultural trades practised in the Dominion he first commanded. While the plaza is arranged along the skewed cardinality characteristic of Montreal, Macdonald looks west-northwest, under a canopy created by trades, at the vast expanse awaiting the command coming from Montreal. Also, he faces off against the tribute to Sir Wilfrid Laurier, across the street in what is now Dorchester Square.

The two cannons flanking the monument were used at Sevastopol in the Crimean War and were a gift from Queen Victoria to the City of Montreal in 1892, to mark the 250th anniversary of the founding of the city.

== History ==
The monument was unveiled by John Hamilton-Gordon, Earl of Aberdeen, Governor General of Canada on 6 June 1895.

=== Vandalism and calls for removal ===
Reassessments of Macdondald's role in Canadian history, particularly his assimilationist policies toward Indigenous Canadians and racist views of Asian immigrants, led to statues of Macdonald being removed and sometimes vandalized in other cities in the first decades of the 21st century. Since 2017, the Monument has itself been subjected to repeated vandalism, and was painted blue during an Extinction Rebellion protest.

=== Renewed calls for removal ===
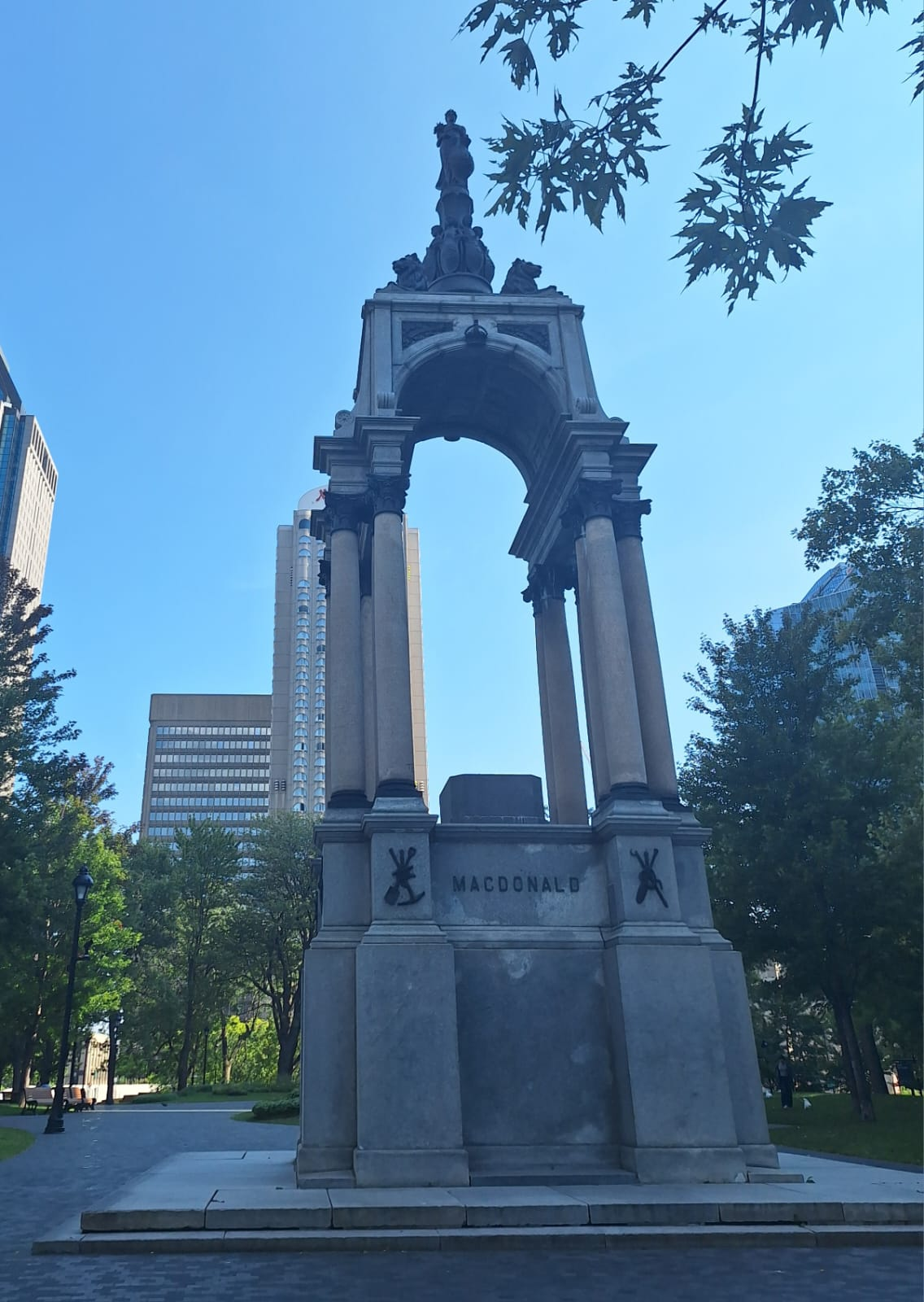
Macdonald Monument without its statue after it was toppled in 2020

In the midst of the 2020 protests against racism and police brutality, which took place worldwide in solidarity with those following the murder of George Floyd while in police custody, and the removal of Confederate Army statues in the United States, Canadian cities have seen a rise in calls to remove Macdonald statues, and those of others linked to Canada's colonial legacy. Early in June, it was reported that the Monument was on a list of 15 statues across Canada subject to petition for removal, with a Change.org petition in Montreal calling for the Monument's removal having garnered 2,100 signatures as of 8 June.

On 29 August 2020, during a defund the police protest, the statue in the monument was vandalized, toppled and inadvertently decapitated. Montreal Mayor Valérie Plante condemned the actions and said the city plans to restore the statue.

Three years later however, on 30 August 2023, the decision was eventually taken to follow a committee recommendation and not reinstate the statue; the statue will still be restored and relocated to a new site with a plaque.

== Gallery ==
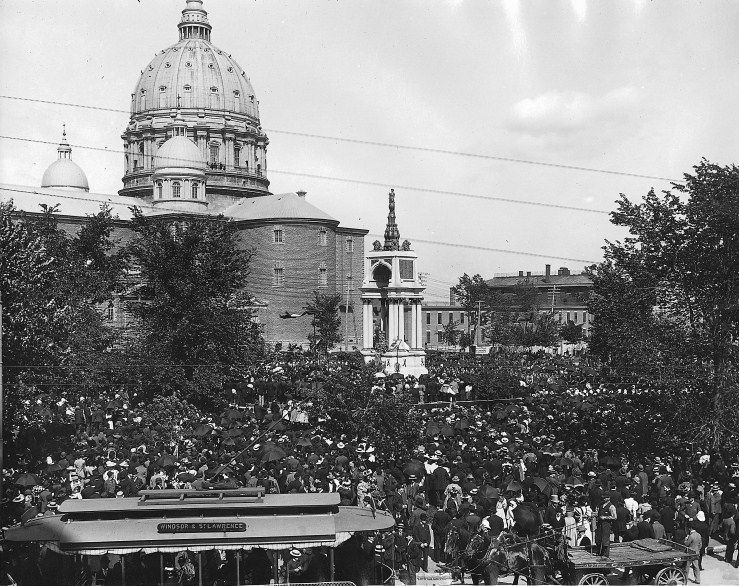
Unveiling of the monument on June 6, 1895

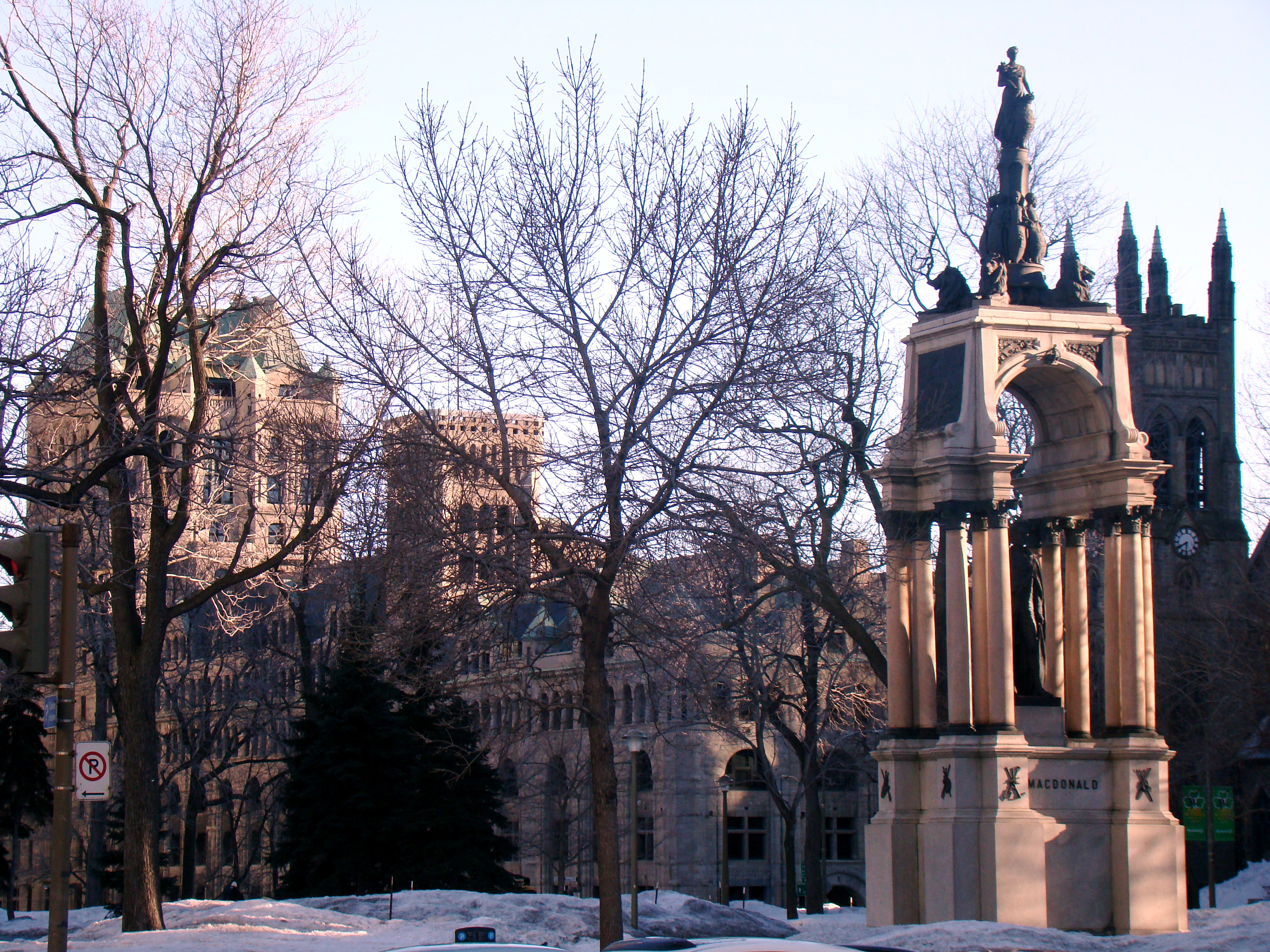
Place du Canada from René Lévesque Boulevard; Windsor Station in behind

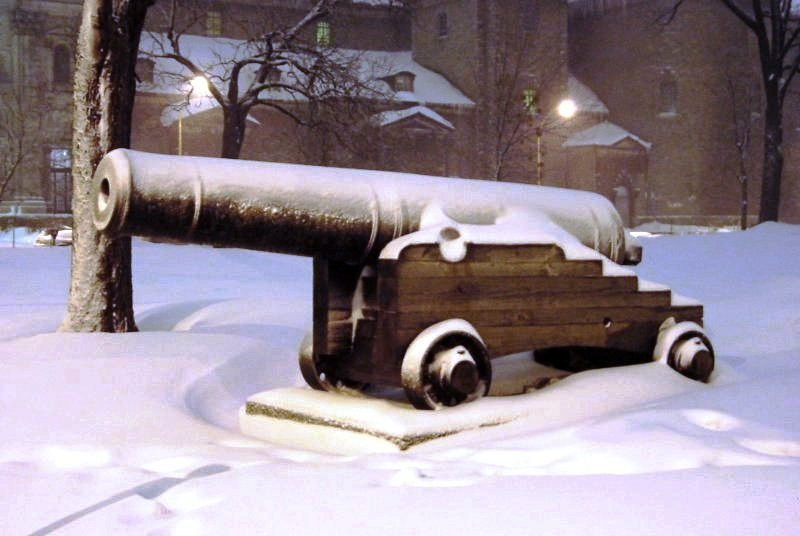
A cannon flanking the monument

Canada Day, 2013

== See also ==
- List of monuments and memorials removed during the George Floyd protests
