= List of documents from the constitutional history of Canada =

This is a list of significant documents related to the history of the Constitution of Canada, some of which constitute part of the Constitution itself. (see List of Canadian constitutional documents for a list of documents that make up the Constitution).

== Pre-Confederation ==
- Articles of Capitulation of Quebec (September 18, 1759)
- Articles of Capitulation of Montreal (September 8, 1760)
- Treaty of Paris (1763) (February 10, 1763)
- British Royal Proclamation of 1763 (October 7, 1763)
- Instructions to Governor Murray
- Instructions to Governor Carleton
- Quebec Act (June 22, 1774)
- Constitutional Act of 1791 (June 10, 1791)
- Ninety-Two Resolutions (February 21, 1834)
- Report of the Royal Commission for the Investigation of all Grievances Affecting His Majesty's Subjects of Lower Canada (1837)
- Lord John Russell's Ten Resolutions (March 6, 1837)
- Declaration of Independence of Lower Canada (February 22, 1838)
- Report on the Affairs of British North America (1839) (February, 1839)
- Act of Union (1840) (February 10, 1841)
- British North America Act 1867 (July 1, 1867)

== Confederation ==
- Manitoba Act (1870)
- Francoeur motion (1918)
- Statute of Westminster (1931)
- Report of the Rowell-Dafoe-Sirois Royal Commission on Dominion-Provincial Relations (1940)
- Letters Patent (1947)
- Report of the Tremblay Royal Commission of Inquiry on Constitutional Problems (1953)
- Report of the Laurendeau-Dunton Royal Commission on Bilingualism and Biculturalism (1963)
- Official Languages Act (1969)
- Victoria Charter (1971)
- Report of the Gendron Commission of Inquiry on the Situation of the French Language and Linguistic Rights in Quebec (1972)
- Charter of the French Language (1977)
- Report of The Pépin Robarts Commission - Task Force on Canadian Unity (1978)
- Sovereignty-Association Act (1980)
- Canada Act 1982 (1982)
- Meech Lake Accord (1989)
- Beaudoin-Edwards committee report (June 20, 1991)
- Report of the Bélanger-Campeau Commission on the Political and Constitutional Future of Québec (March 27, 1991)
- Allaire Report (January 28, 1991)
- Report of the Citizens' Forum on Canada's Future ("Spicer Commission"), 1991
- Report of the Parliamentary Committee to Examine Matters Relating to the Accession of Québec to Sovereignty (1992)
- Charlottetown Accord (1992)
- Act Respecting the Future of Quebec (1995)
- 1997 Calgary Accord
- Reference re Secession of Quebec (1998)
- Clarity Act (1998)
- Act respecting the exercise of the fundamental rights and prerogatives of the Québec people and the Québec State (1999)
