= Bill 1: Act Respecting the Future of Quebec =

Bill in Quebec National Assembly

National Assembly of Quebec
- Considered by: National Assembly of Quebec

Legislative history
- Bill title: Bill 1: Act Respecting the Future of Quebec
- Introduced by: Jacques Parizeau, Premier of Quebec
- First reading: 7 September 1995
- Status: Not passed

Bill 1: Act Respecting the Future of Quebec (also known as the "Sovereignty Bill") was a bill proposed to the Quebec National Assembly by Premier Jacques Parizeau and his Parti Québécois government in 1995. It proposed to give the National Assembly the power to declare Quebec sovereign, with the "exclusive power to pass all its laws, levy all its taxes and conclude all its treaties". It received a first reading in the National Assembly but the final version of the bill was never voted on following the defeat of the sovereignty option in the 1995 Quebec referendum. Had it become law, it would have served as the legal basis for the Quebec government to declare Quebec a sovereign country.

== Preamble ==
The bill contained a 1,586-word preamble, evoking the history of Quebec and the right of the Quebec people to choose its destiny. It also contained considerable poetic phrases, such as "We know the winter in our souls. We know its blustery days, its solitude, its false eternity and its apparent deaths." It concluded with the phrase, "We, the people of Québec, through our National Assembly, proclaim: Québec is a sovereign country."

The original version of the bill had a blank page as its preamble. Jacques Parizeau explained it this way:

... the preamble... has intentionally been left unwritten. This preamble will eventually become the Declaration of Sovereignty of Quebec. It must describe who we are as a people and who we wish to become. As such, it must be a vivid reflection of our values and our hopes, our traditions and our ambitions. This blank page calls out to all of us. We must devise it together, participate and contribute the best of ourselves.

In the end, the preamble was written by several prominent pro-sovereignty Quebec writers and poets, including famous Quebec singer Gilles Vigneault, author-playwright Marie Laberge, sociologist Fernand Dumont and constitutional experts Andrée Lajoie and Henri Brun.

== Main text ==
In addition to declaring Quebec a sovereign country, the bill laid out several key steps in the independence process. It required the Government of Quebec to propose to the rest of Canada a partnership treaty based on a "Tripartite Agreement" signed on 12 June 1995 between Parizeau, Bloc Québécois leader Lucien Bouchard and Action democratique du Quebec leader, Mario Dumont. This agreement outlined a series of proposals that the leaders agreed a sovereign Quebec would make to Canada to share power between the two countries, including in the areas of:

- customs union;
- free movement of goods;
- free movement of individuals;
- free movement of services;
- free movement of capital;
- monetary policy;
- labour mobility; and
- citizenship.

The Bill provided that negotiations on a partnership treaty could not extend past 30 October 1996 (one year after the 1995 referendum).

The Bill also foresaw the drafting of a new Quebec constitution, the continuity of Quebec's current boundaries, the creation of a Quebec citizenship, use of the Canadian dollar and continuity of current laws and social benefits.

== Political significance ==
The bill was part of the Quebec government's strategy to increase support for sovereignty prior to the 1995 referendum. The Parti Québécois promised during the 1994 Quebec election to hold a referendum during 1995. However, the Parti Québécois received only 0.35% more votes than the federalist Quebec Liberal Party in that election, and polls at the time showed that Quebec independence (at least, without significant economic and political links with Canada) was not supported by the majority of Quebecers. Along with the February 1995 hearings on the future of Quebec and the 12 June 1995 Tripartite agreement between Parizeau, Bouchard and Dumont, the sovereignty bill was designed to both get people interested in discussing Quebec sovereignty and reassure Quebecers about the likelihood that a sovereign Quebec would retain links with Canada. As part of this strategy, the draft bill was sent to every Quebec household by the Quebec government in advance of the referendum campaign, along with a copy of the Parizeau-Bouchard-Dumont agreement of 12 June 1995. Despite these efforts, polls did not show a significant increase in support for Quebec sovereignty until the final weeks of the October 1995 referendum campaign.

The bill was explicitly referred to in the question appearing on the ballot in the 1995 Quebec sovereignty referendum:

Do you agree that Québec should become sovereign after having made a formal offer to Canada for a new economic and political partnership within the scope of the bill respecting the future of Québec and of the agreement signed on 12 June 1995?.

== See also ==
- 1995 Quebec referendum
- List of documents from the constitutional history of Canada
- Quebec sovereignty movement
- Politics of Quebec
