= Pierre F. Côté =

Canadian civil servant and lawyer

Chief Electoral Officer of Quebec
- In office May 25, 1978 – July 16, 1997
- Preceded by: Office created
- Succeeded by: François Casgrain

Personal details
- Born: July 16, 1927 Quebec City, Quebec, Canada
- Died: June 17, 2013 (aged 85)

Pierre-Ferdinand Côté, OQ (July 16, 1927 – June 17, 2013) was a Canadian civil servant and lawyer. Côté served as the first Chief Electoral Officer of Quebec from 1978 until 1997. The Chief Electoral Officer is the official responsible for the administration of the electoral and referendum system in the province of Quebec.

Côté began his career as a Quebec City lawyer. He first entered politics as the chief of staff of René Lévesque when Lévesque served as the provincial Minister of Natural Resources within the government of Quebec Premier Jean Lesage during the 1960s.

He was appointed as the first Chief Electoral Officer of Quebec in 1978. He oversaw the administration of Quebec's elections and referendums for nearly twenty years, including the Charlottetown Accord referendum and the Quebec independence referendum held on October 30, 1995.

During the run-up to the 1995 referendum, Côté accused attendees of a pro-Canadian unity rally of violating provincial spending laws, prompting criticism from Québécois federalists. The large pro-union rally was held in Montreal on October 27, 1995, just three days before the sovereignty referendum. Côté formally charged a number of pro-union rally participants, individuals and businesses, all from outside Quebec, with violating the province's spending laws by transporting people to Montreal for the rally. The move was heavily criticized by federalists within Quebec and across Canada.

Federalists accused Côté of minimizing the unusually high number of spoiled ballots from pro-federalist ridings. A later investigation of Côté and the referendum found no evidence to support accusations of wrongdoing.

In 1998, Côté was named an officer of the National Order of Quebec.

Côté died on June 17, 2013, at the age of 85.
