= Place du Canada =

Square in Montreal, Canada

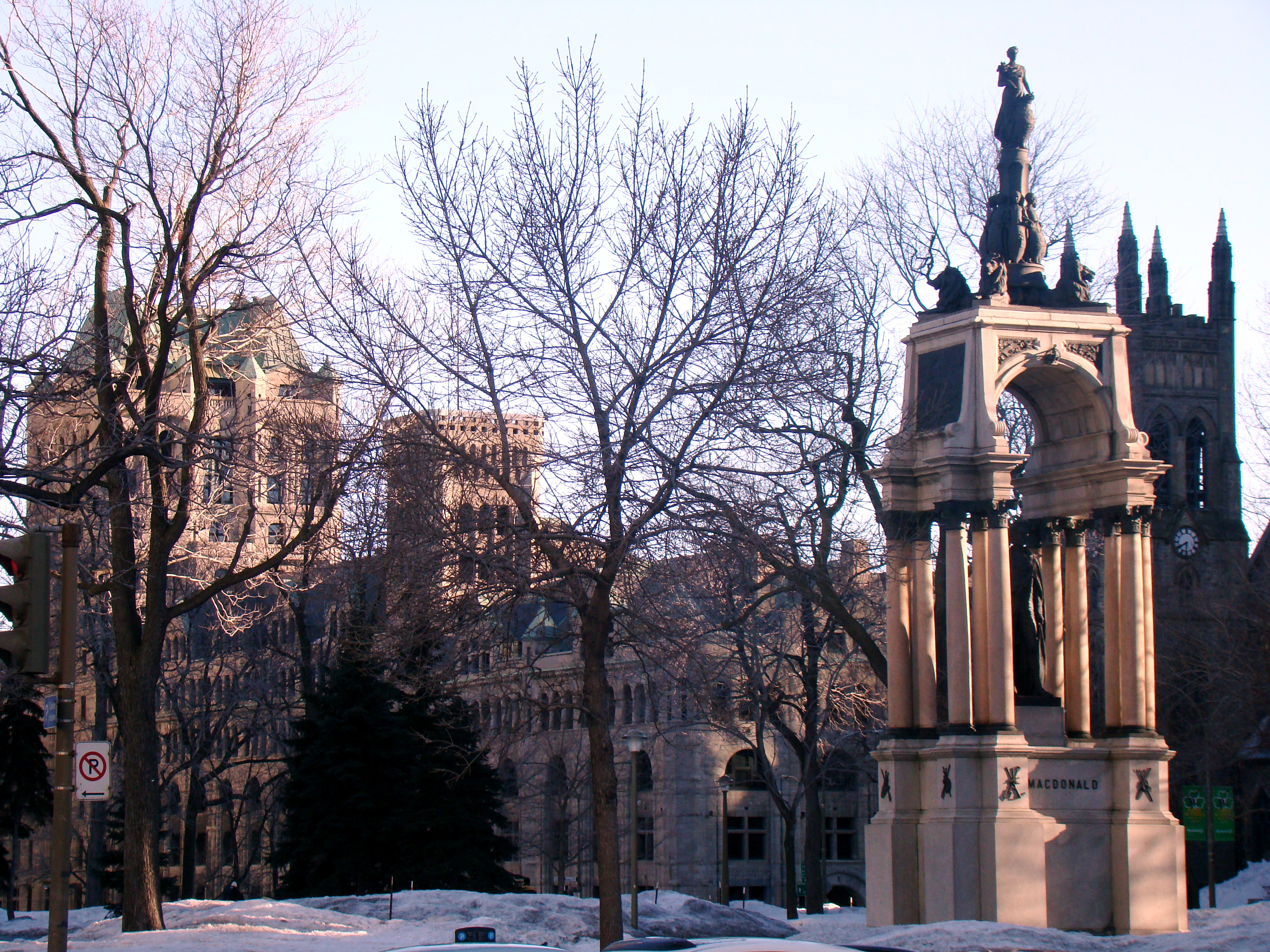
- Place du Canada from René Lévesque Boulevard.

- Location within Montreal
- Type: Town square
- Location: Ville-Marie, Montreal, Quebec, Canada
- Coordinates: 45°29′54″N 73°34′08″W
- Area: 1.4 hectares (3.46 acres)
- Created: 1876 (renamed 1967)
- Operator: City of Montreal
- Status: Open all year

Place du Canada (part of Dominion Square until 1967) is a large urban square in downtown Montreal.

== Overview ==
At 14,000 square metres (150,000 sq ft) it is slightly larger than the adjacent Dorchester Square, with a more varied topography due to a downward slope towards De la Gauchetière Street. Place du Canada also differs from Dorchester Square in having manicured, though densely packed, pockets of flora arranged to impede direct lines of sight and diffuse pedestrian traffic. The French term place can roughly be translated as denoting a plaza, which has a different legal definition from squares or parks in Montreal. It is open twenty-four hours per day and is bordered by René Lévesque Boulevard to the North, Peel to the East, De la Cathédrale to the West and De la Gauchetière Street to the South.

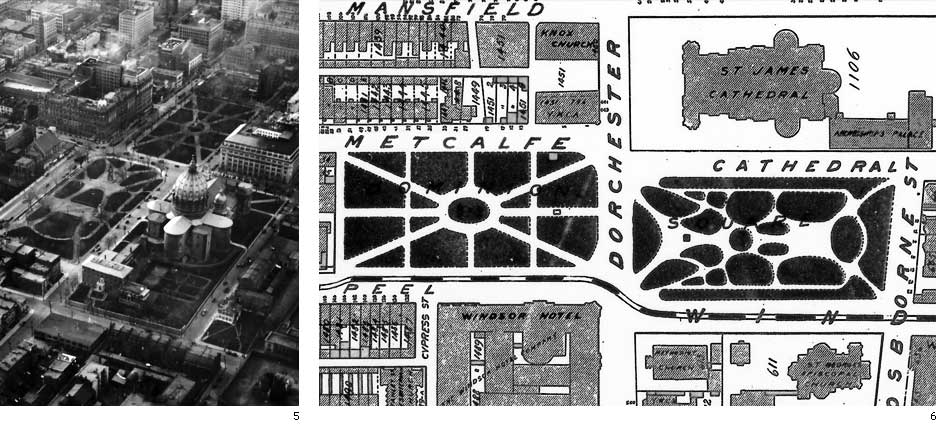
Photo of Dominion Square in 1927 and the 1907 Groundplan. Notice the key design differences between the square and the plaza

== History ==
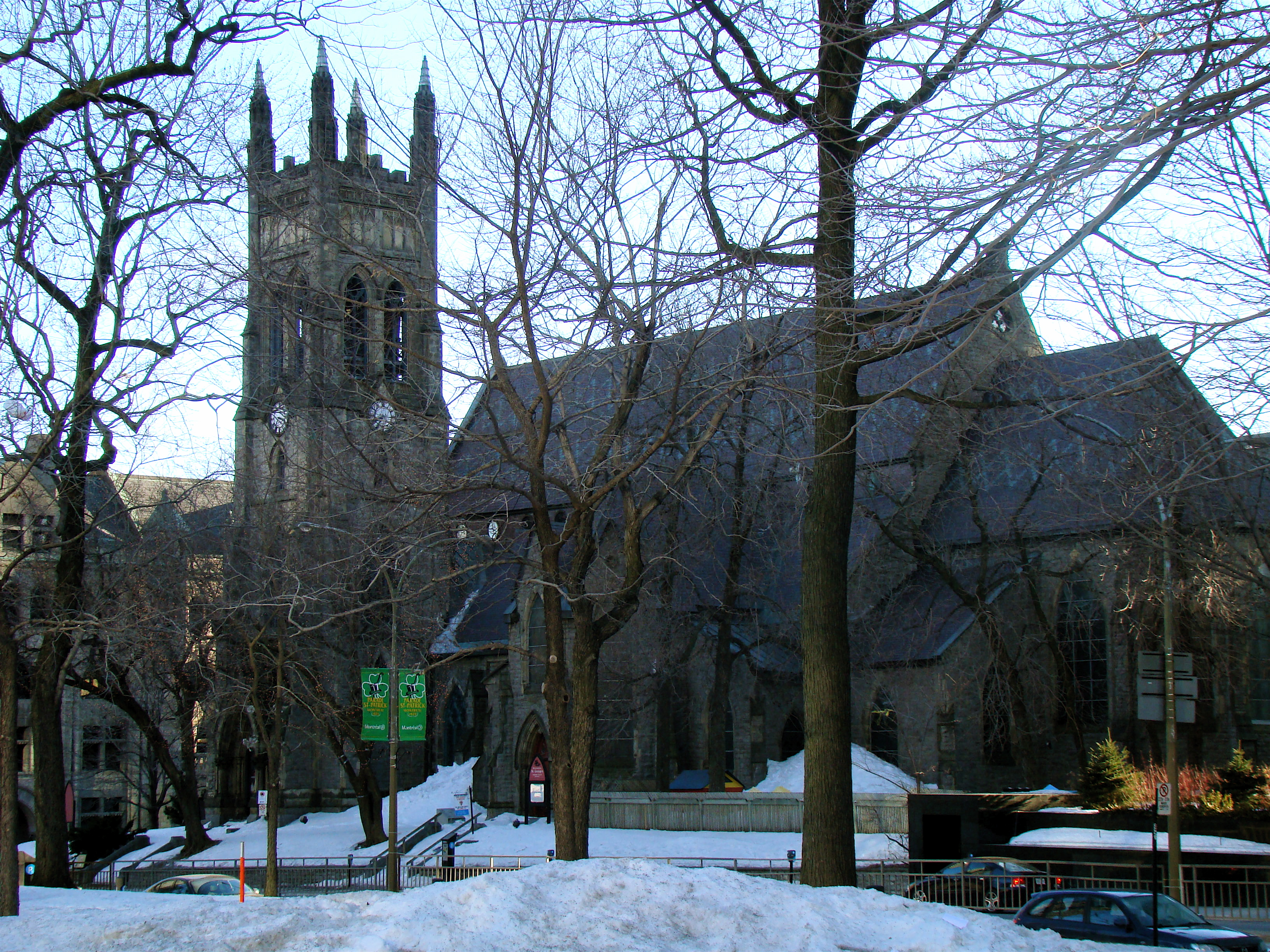
St. George's Anglican Church from Place du Canada

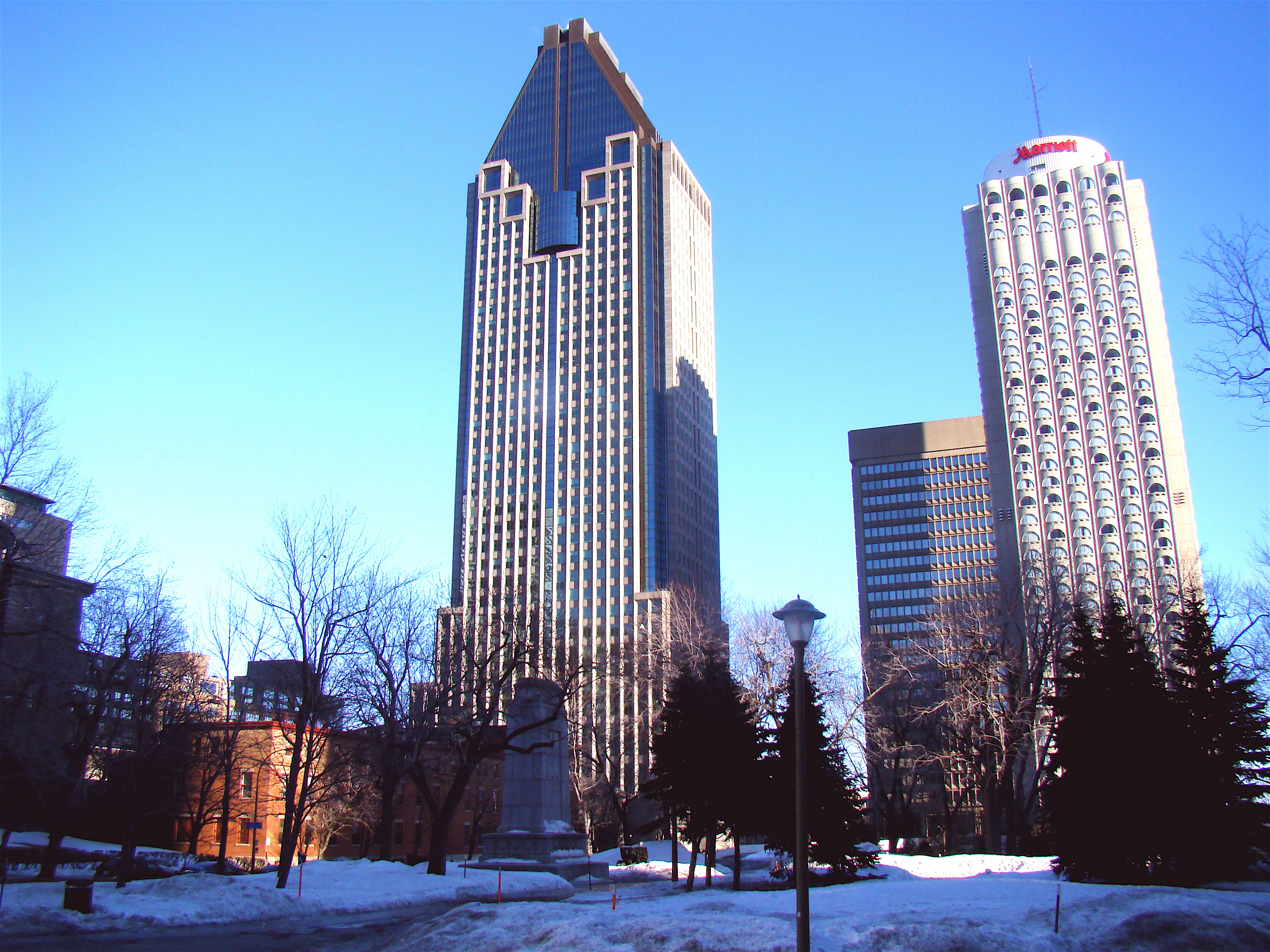
Centre of the plaza with cenotaph in foreground and 1000 de La Gauchetière, Place-du-Canada and the Chateau Champlain in the background.

Place du Canada was developed along with the present Dorchester Square between 1872 and 1876 and was formally inaugurated that year as Dominion Square. It quickly developed into a prestige address and major transportation hub, with streetcars, cabs, carriages (and by 1889) the Canadian Pacific Railway's Windsor Station at the southwest corner of the plaza. What had once been an informal meeting place and common green would be formalized as a pedestrian traffic corridor, linking the estates and middle class suburbs to the west and northwest with the commercial sector moving up the hill from the southeast. As an urban square, it satisfied two goals; first to provide a method of diffusing transit nodes, and second as an open manicured natural environment to provide rest, recreation and a healthy respite from the cramped industrial and business core immediately south of the area.

After the cholera outbreak of 1851, the area had been the site for several hastily convened cemeteries of various denominations. Beginning in 1854, the City of Montreal began exhuming the bodies from the Saint-Antoine Catholic Cemetery to be relocated to Notre-Dame-des-Neiges Cemetery on the northeast slope of Mount Royal. This allowed for the extension of Dorchester Boulevard (now René-Lévesque Boulevard) to the west and the development of this area. Several large properties were surveyed and offered for sale.

In 1869, St. George's Anglican Church was built on the along the western side of the plaza, which was a former Jewish cemetery that had also relocated to Mount Royal, near the entrance of the Mount Royal Cemetery. Soon, many other Protestant denominations would build churches in the same area—beginning the trend that would establish the site as a prestige address.

That same year, it was suggested that the City of Montreal purchase the former Catholic cemetery and transform it into a public park in order to prevent the movement of bodies of cholera victims. The following year (1870), the land was purchased and landscaping was done. In 1872, it was given the name Dominion Square. This name came from Canada, which consisted of the four provinces that make up the Canadian Confederation in 1867.

In the 1870s, Mary, Queen of the World Cathedral took up its form as a one-fifth replica of St. Peter's Cathedral along De la Cathédrale forming the eastern side of the plaza. By 1889, Windsor Station would take up its prominent position at the corner of Peel and De la Gauchetière, with the plaza providing a path directly to the corner opposite. In 1895, the Macdonald Monument would be constructed under a stone baldachin in the centre of the northern third of the plaza. His baldachin is replete with copper bas reliefs of the various industrial and agricultural trades practised in the Dominion he first commanded. While the plaza is arranged along the skewed cardinality characteristic of Montreal, John A. Macdonald looks more west-northwest than north. The monument is purposeful; under a canopy created by the union of industry and agriculture, Canada's chief securely observes the vast expanse that awaits the command coming from Montreal.

In 1967, when Canada celebrated its centennial anniversary, the southern portion of Dominion Square was renamed and given the name of Place du Canada. From this point, the southern and northern section of the park had different names.

Place du Canada was the site of the Unity Rally, a massive political rally held on October 27, 1995, in downtown Montreal, where an estimated 100,000 Canadians from in and outside Quebec came to celebrate a united Canada, and plead with Quebecers to vote "No" in the 1995 Quebec independence referendum (three days before the vote).

== Monuments ==
- John A. Macdonald Monument, by George E. Wade (1895)
- Montreal Cenotaph (1924). Replica of the Cenotaph on Whitehall in the City of Westminster of London.
- Two cannons (1889), offered by Queen Victoria
- Mitrailleuse
