= Libman v Quebec (AG) =

Judgement of the Supreme Court of Canada

- Supreme Court of Canada

Hearing: April 22, 1997 Judgment: October 9, 1997
- Full case name: Libman v. Quebec (Attorney General)
- Citations: [1997] 3 S.C.R. 569

Court membership
- Chief Justice: Antonio Lamer; Puisne Justices: Gérard La Forest, Claire L'Heureux-Dubé, John Sopinka, Charles Gonthier, Peter Cory, Beverley McLachlin, Frank Iacobucci, John C. Major

Reasons given

Libman v Quebec (AG) [1997] 3 S.C.R. 569 is a Supreme Court of Canada ruling issued on October 9, 1997, which invalidated part of Quebec's referendum law dealing with the regulation of expenses by third parties during a referendum campaign.

A former leader of the Quebec Equality Party, Robert Libman, took the case to court after the 1992 referendum on the Charlottetown Accord.

The Supreme Court overturned the Court of Quebec, the Quebec Superior Court, and the Quebec Court of Appeal. The section of the Referendum Act that ruled out third party expenditure (s. 404) was considered incompatible with freedom of expression under section 2 of the Canadian Charter of Rights and Freedoms.

The Supreme Court found that the objectives of the Act "to permit an informed choice to be made by ensuring that some positions are not buried by others" and "to preserve the confidence of the electorate in a democratic process that it knows will not be dominated by the power of money" are valid and praiseworthy. However, ruling out third party expenditure altogether was too restrictive to be justified as a reasonable limit "prescribed by law as can be demonstrably justified in a free and democratic society" as per section 1 of the Charter.

The Supreme Court's judges suggested the Quebec legislature limit expenditure by "private intervenors" to $300 on "publicity expenses" to advertise the intervenor's views on a matter of public interest and raise the ceiling of $600 to organize a meeting to $1000.

As a result, the Chief Electoral Officer of Quebec was forced to drop charges on 20 people prosecuted under the Quebec Referendum Act for illegal spendings during the 1995 referendum on sovereignty.

== See also ==
- Politics of Quebec
- List of Supreme Court of Canada cases (Lamer Court)
