= Unity Rally =

1995 rally in opposition of Quebec's independence

The Unity Rally (French: Rassemblement de l'unité) was a rally held on October 27, 1995, in downtown Montreal, where an estimated 100,000 Canadians from in and outside Quebec came to celebrate a united Canada, and plead with Quebecers to vote "No" in the Quebec independence referendum (held three days after the rally). Held at the Place du Canada, it was Canada's biggest political rally until the 2012 Quebec student protests. The rally attracted considerable controversy because corporate sponsors, particularly from outside Quebec, made what, in the view of the Director General of Elections in Quebec, were illegal contributions to the No campaign (for example offering free or heavily discounted transportation to Montreal for demonstrators). In the end, it was determined that these provisions of Quebec's electoral laws did not apply to sponsors located outside Quebec.

== Events ==
Prime Minister Jean Chrétien, Progressive Conservative Party leader Jean Charest and Quebec Liberal Party leader Daniel Johnson spoke to the crowd. Minister of Fisheries and Oceans Brian Tobin played a crucial role in organizing and promoting the event. Many Canadian politicians from outside Quebec, who had previously been asked not to get involved by the "No" committee, participated in the event, notably Ontario Premier Mike Harris, New Brunswick Premier Frank McKenna, Nova Scotia Premier John Savage, and Prince Edward Island Premier Catherine Callbeck. "Welcome to our future partners," read a sign streaming from the back of an airplane that circled the skies above the massive rally.

Several Canadian phone companies joined the rally, Newfoundland Telephone Co. Ltd, BC Tel, AGT Inc and New Brunswick Telephone Co. Ltd. allowed residential customers to make free five-minute long-distance calls to Quebec from 9 a.m. to 5 p.m.

Canadian transportation corporations and companies, such as Via Rail, Canadian Airlines, Air Canada and Coach Canada, in addition to multiple travel agencies and hotel operators throughout the country, offered massive discounts on travel to Montreal for the weekend to participate. Though the legality of this particular element of the rally remained controversial and in litigation for some time afterward, the social, psychological and economic impact of the rally is generally viewed as the deciding factor for the "No" campaign.

A Le Devoir article described the event as "Les touristes du fédéralisme".

== Crowd ==
This estimated number was largely disputed on the day of the rally and for many years after. (There were huge discrepancies on the size of the crowd in the media. Montreal's English-language radio station CJAD reported the crowd at upward of 150,000, where CKAC, a French-language radio station, reported the crowd at 30,000.) A study of video footage by CBC television put the estimate at around 60,000.

== Charges ==
Aurèle Gervais, communications director for the Liberal Party of Canada, as well as the students' association at Ottawa's Algonquin College, were charged after the referendum for illegally hiring buses to bring supporters to Montreal for the rally, part of a larger accusation by some supporters of Quebec sovereignty that much of the spending on the rally was illegal because it was not authorized by the "No" Committee or entered in its expenditure report. Environment Minister Sergio Marchi told reporters "Mr. Gervais, on behalf of the Liberal Party of Canada, should wear [the charges against him] like a badge of honour," and "I think it's a crock and they should stop nickelling and diming Canadians' sense of patriotism to death." Two years later, the Quebec Superior Court dismissed the charges, stating that the alleged infractions took place outside of Quebec, and did not break any laws under the Quebec Electoral Act.

Robin Philpot, co-author of the book Les secrets d'Option Canada, said that Brian Tobin, chief organizer for the rally, told him that various Canadian corporations had helped to fund the initiative. Two days prior to the rally, Canadian Airlines had announced its "Unity fare: up to 90% discounts for people who want to purchase tickets from anywhere in Canada." Quebec chief electoral officer Pierre F. Côté then issued a warning to six Canadian transport companies, including Air Canada, Canadian Airlines and Via Rail, that they would face up to a $10,000 fine for any money illegally spent transporting people to Montreal.

== See also ==
- 1995 Quebec referendum
