= Robin Philpot =

French-Canadian journalist and politician (born 1948)

Robin Philpot (born 1948) is a Quebec journalist and 2007 electoral candidate for the Parti Québécois.

== Background ==
Originally from Thunder Bay, Ontario, where his father Roderick Philpot was an alderman of the city of Fort William, Philpot is a graduate of Fort William Collegiate Institute and earned degrees in literature and history from the University of Toronto. After working in Africa, he established himself in Quebec in 1974. In 1999, he became director of communications for the Saint-Jean-Baptiste Society in Montreal. He founded publishing company Baraka Books in 2009 with the support of Denis Vaugeois and Gilles Herman.

== Political views ==
Philpot has called into question the testimony of Roméo Dallaire on the Rwandan genocide; his brother is the Montreal lawyer John Philpot, who represented Jean-Paul Akayesu and other defendants accused of genocide and crimes against humanity at the trials conducted by the International Criminal Tribunal for Rwanda. He is also known for his role in attacking the former federal Liberal government over the Option Canada program, a promotional enterprise funded by the federal government intended to promote federalism in Quebec and counter the Quebec sovereignty movement. His book Oka: dernier alibi du Canada anglais analyses the Oka Crisis, arguing that the dispute was used by English Canada as a political tool against Quebec.

== 2007 campaign ==
Philpot was an unsuccessful candidate for the riding of Saint-Henri–Sainte-Anne in the 2007 Quebec general election, representing the Parti Québécois. During the campaign, remarks by Philpot about the Rwandan Genocide were publicised, including the statement: "In none of my writings have I denied that there were mass killings, some even of an ethnic character. However, I categorically reject the abusive use of the expression 'genocide'", from a 2004 opinion piece in Le Devoir. The Parti Québécois was criticised over these remarks; PQ leader André Boisclair defended Philpot, stating that Philpot's words had been misrepresented.

== Works ==
- 2004: Rwanda 1994: Colonialism dies hard
- 2006: Les secrets d'Option Canada (coauthored by Normand Lester)
- 2009: A People's History of Quebec (cowritten by Jacques Lacoursière)
