= Élections Québec =

Election agency in Quebec, Canada

Élections Québec (French pronunciation: [elɛksjɔ̃ kebɛk]) is the independent office of the National Assembly of Quebec that oversees the administration of the electoral and referendum system in Quebec, Canada. It is led by the chief electoral officer of Quebec (French: Directeur général des élections du Québec, pronounced [diʁɛktœʁ ʒeneʁal dez‿elɛksjɔ̃ dy kebɛk]; DGEQ).

== Chief electoral officer ==
The chief electoral officer designates both a person and a position. Since 2015, Pierre Reid has served as DGEQ; he also simultaneously serves as the president of Commission de la représentation électorale (Commission of Electoral Representation). The DGEQ is also responsible for providing electors with information and ensuring transparency in the Quebec political financing system.

A former Quebec chief electoral officer, Pierre F. Côté, became well known in Quebec for his warnings and reports on alleged financing and voting irregularities during the 1995 Quebec independence referendum.

== List of chief electoral officers of Quebec ==
1. Pierre F. Côté (May 25, 1978 – July 16, 1997)
2. François Casgrain (interim; July 16, 1997 – July 13, 1998)
3. Jacques Girard (July 13, 1998 – April 21, 1999)
4. Jean Jolin (interim; April 21, 1999 – November 3, 1999)
5. Francine Barry (interim; November 3, 1999 – May 3, 2000)
6. Marcel Blanchet (May 3, 2000 – January 1, 2011)
7. Jacques Drouin (January 1, 2011 – July 11, 2014)
8. Pierre Reid (July 12, 2015 – present)

== See also ==
- Chief Electoral Officer (Canada)
- Politics of Quebec
