= Canadian Unity Council =

Canadian non-profit organization

The Canadian Unity Council (CUC) was a privately owned, non-profit organization whose mission was to promote the Canadian Unity and the current federal institutions.

The CUC started as the "Canada Committee" in 1964, in the middle of Quebec's Quiet Revolution. The period corresponds to the rise of both the Quebec independence movement and the demands for reform by Quebec federalists.

The election of the Parti Québécois in 1976 gave the impulse for a coalition strategy, which included all federalist parties. Funded by the Government of Canada, the CUC published numerous pro-Canada studies advertising the merits of Canadian federalism.

In 1996, the Centre for Research and Information on Canada (CRIC) was created to assist in the CUC's mission to promote the federal government's view of what federal Canada is.

In 2006, the Government of Stephen Harper announced the reduction of funding for the Unity Council.

== Centre for Research and Information on Canada ==
The Centre for Research and Information on Canada (CRIC) was an organization established in 1996 by the CUC to manage its research and communications activities. The organization was divided into two branches: one to research on Canada (CRIC Research) and the other to inform Canadian citizens of the research's findings (CRIC Information).

The research office was located in Ottawa and is responsible for conducting studies and polls, and drafting special publications. The Communications and Citizen Participation Office oversaw the activities of three regional offices: the Ontario and Atlantic Canada Regional Office (Toronto), the Western and Northern Regional Office (Calgary) and the Quebec Regional Office (Quebec City). The CRIC published a weekly newsletter called Opinion Canada.

As of August 9, 2010, the CIRC and the Canadian Unity Council are no longer available on the Internet.

== Board of directors ==
- 2005
  - Chairman of the Board -The Honourable Bob Rae, P.C., O.C., Q.C., LL.D. - Partner, Goodmans - Toronto, ON
  - Vice-Chairman - Mr. George N. Addy - Senior Partner, Davies Ward Phillips & Vineberg LLP - Toronto, ON
  - Vice-Chairman - Mr. Gilbert G. Dalton, C.A. - Executive Vice-President & C.F.O., Baine Johnston Corporation - St. John's, NL
  - Secretary - Mr. Ronald Bilodeau - Vice-President, East Canadian Pacific Railway - Montreal, QC
  - President & Chief Executive Officer - Mr. Michel Desjardins - The Canadian Unity Council - Montreal, QC
