= Côte Saint-Luc =

City on the Island of Montreal, Quebec, Canada

- City
- City of Côte Saint-Luc
- Aerial view of Côte Saint-Luc in winter, showing the mix of apartment towers, townhouses and detached houses typical of the city

- Coat of arms Logo
- Motto: Civibus Meis ("For My Citizens")
- Location of Côte Saint-Luc on the Island of Montreal
- Coordinates: 45°28′N 73°40′W
- Country: Canada
- Province: Quebec
- Region: Montréal
- Village: April 25, 1903
- Town: December 19, 1951
- City: February 14, 1958
- Reconstituted: January 1, 2006
- Electoral Districts Federal: Mount Royal
- Provincial: D'Arcy-McGee

Government
  - Mayor: David Tordjman
  - Federal MP(s): Anthony Housefather (LIB)
  - Quebec MNA(s): Elisabeth Prass (PLQ)

Area
  - Land: 7.04 km^{2} (2.72 sq mi)

Population (2021)
  - Total: 34,504
  - Density: 4,903.7/km^{2} (12,701/sq mi)
  - Pop. 2016-2021: ▲6.3
  - Dwellings: 15,548
- Demonym: Côte Saint-Lucer
- Time zone: UTC-5 (Eastern (EST))
  - Summer (DST): UTC-4 (EDT)
- Postal code(s): H4V, H4W, H4X
- Area codes: (514) and (438)
- Website: cotesaintluc.org

Côte Saint-Luc (French pronunciation: [kot sɛ̃ lyk]) (Note: The city, like the provincial statutes that incorporated it in 1903, 1951 and 1958, writes its name without a hyphen between "Côte" and "Saint-Luc". The Quebec government's official list of municipal names, published in the Gazette officielle du Québec on March 15, 1969, adopted the hyphenated form Côte-Saint-Luc, which is used by the Commission de toponymie du Québec and by Statistics Canada. The place was also known historically in English as Cote St. Luke.) is a city on the Island of Montreal in Quebec, Canada. A residential suburb bordered mostly by boroughs of the city of Montreal and by the towns of Hampstead and Montreal West, it is one of the fifteen suburban municipalities that, with Montreal, form the urban agglomeration of Montreal. With 34,504 residents at the 2021 Canadian census, it is the third most populous municipality on the island after Montreal and Dollard-des-Ormeaux.

The name records one of the côtes, or rows of long farm lots, into which the Sulpician seigneurs divided the island under the French regime; the côte Saint-Luc was farmed by French-Canadian families for two centuries and had some 200 inhabitants in 1818. Detached from the village of Notre-Dame-de-Grâce-Ouest and incorporated as a village in 1903, it lost its north-eastern lots to the new town of Hampstead in 1914 and still counted fewer than 800 people in 1941. After the Second World War it was transformed within fifteen years into a suburb of bungalows, to which apartment towers were added in the 1960s and 1970s; it became a town in 1951 and a city in 1958, and its population passed 20,000 by 1966. Most of the newcomers were Jewish families moving west from central Montreal: by 1971 three-quarters of residents were Jewish, and according to the Jewish community's own census analyses the city has the largest Jewish population of any district or suburb in the Montreal area.

Predominantly English-speaking and officially bilingual under Quebec's Charter of the French Language, the city has repeatedly taken public positions on language laws and sovereignty on behalf of its anglophone and Jewish residents. It was merged into Montreal on January 1, 2002, and re-established as an independent city on January 1, 2006, after 87 per cent of voters in a 2004 referendum chose to leave. About a third of its territory is taken up by Canadian Pacific's St-Luc rail yard, opened in 1950, which, with the rail lines that feed it, leaves the main part of the city with only two road exits under the tracks; the extension of Cavendish Boulevard across the yards, first planned in the 1960s, has never been built. The city is also known for its volunteer emergency medical service, for a public library that opens every day of the year, and for an unusually elderly population, more than a quarter of which is aged 65 or over.

== Toponymy ==
On the Island of Montreal the word côte did not originally mean a slope. Under the seigneurial regime it designated a unit of agrarian settlement: a row of narrow, parallel lots running back from a river bank or, in the interior of the island, from a common road, and each côte bore its own name. The road serving the côte Saint-Luc is recorded from the seventeenth century. On Péladeau's 1778 plan it branches off the chemin de la Côte-des-Neiges and runs west around the Westmount hill; that eastern stretch is today's Queen Mary Road, and a short north–south road linking it to the chemin de la Côte-Saint-Antoine became Décarie Boulevard. Tollgates were later set up on the road to stop travellers avoiding the toll on the Côte-des-Neiges road.

The origin of "Saint-Luc" is uncertain. The Commission de toponymie du Québec and The Canadian Encyclopedia suggest that it probably recalls Luc de La Corne, known as La Corne Saint-Luc (1711–1784), an officer, merchant and interpreter who spent much of his life in Montreal. The city of Montreal's street-name repertoire, however, dates the chemin de la Côte-Saint-Luc to the seventeenth century, and the town's 1955 Golden Book (Livre d'or) held that the name already appeared on the seigneurs' land roll (terrier) before the last third of that century. The Golden Book concluded that the historian "is reduced to conjecture" and that the name was most likely a pious dedication, perhaps chosen by a man whose Christian name was Luc; the same book's heraldic section, and the city today, attribute it to Saint Luke the Evangelist, whose symbol, a winged bull, appears on the city's coat of arms. (Note: The extract hosted by the city library reproduces the 1955 text with later additions (it lists mayors up to 1976 and mentions the new city hall on Cavendish Boulevard).) The crest of five ears of wheat recalls the city's agricultural origins, the gyronny of silver and black in the base of the shield symbolizes the railway marshalling yard, and the Latin motto Civibus meis was chosen for its deliberate ambiguity: "for my citizens" or "by my citizens".

The city's residents are known in English as Côte Saint-Lucers; the French demonym is Côte-Saint-Luçois.

== History ==
=== The côte under the Sulpicians (1679–1903) ===
The long lots of the côte Saint-Luc on a 1937 copy of Péladeau's 1778 survey, with the boundaries of the village (as of 1937) coloured in

The first land grants on the Coteau Saint-Pierre, the plateau west of Mount Royal, date from the end of the seventeenth century, but the côtes beyond it were peopled mainly in the eighteenth, once the Iroquois wars had ended. In 1679 the Sulpician superior François Dollier de Casson granted Jean Descary eighty arpents "at the end of and adjoining" the concession he already held on Lac Saint-Pierre; Pierre Hurtubise obtained land on the Coteau Saint-Pierre in 1687, Jacques and Philippe Leduc in 1693 and Pierre LeLac in 1696. Clearing of the côte itself began in the early 1700s, and farming remained its livelihood for two centuries. The earliest surviving count dates from 1818, when the Sulpician François Ciquard, charged with visiting the western districts of the parish of Notre-Dame, listed 209 people on the côte Saint-Luc—65 men, 61 women, 41 boys and 42 girls—in about two dozen households headed by Hurtubises, Gougeons, Lemieux, Prud'hommes, Valades, Lorties and Saint-Germains, more than the 177 he found on the neighbouring Coteau Saint-Pierre.

The chapel of 1848, photographed before 1900, when it served as the côte's schoolhouse

The farmers of the côte were the first in the district to ask for a place of worship. They petitioned the Sulpicians for a chapel in December 1845, and it opened in 1848, five years before the church of Notre-Dame-de-Grâce was blessed in 1853. In 1854 the Seminary offered the churchwardens of Notre-Dame twenty acres at Côte Saint-Luc, free of charge, as the site of Montreal's new Catholic cemetery; the wardens preferred the farm they had bought at Côte-des-Neiges, which became Notre Dame des Neiges Cemetery. When the parish of Notre-Dame-de-Grâce was canonically erected in 1867 its territory expressly included "la Côte St-Luc", and the first churchwardens elected in 1874 included members of the Décarie, Lemieux, Prud'homme and Gougeon families that also farmed the côte. By 1900 the old stone chapel was serving as the schoolhouse for the residents of the côte, who by then had their own school commission.

The strip farms of "Cote St. Luke" and their owners—Décaries, Prud'hommes, Lemieux, Gougeons—on Hopkins's 1879 atlas of the parish of Montreal

Lovell's gazetteer of 1873 described Cote St. Luc simply as "a concession in the parish of Notre Dame de Grace ... 2 miles from Montreal. Pop. 300", and the 1879 Hopkins atlas of the island shows the whole côte as a ladder of strip farms owned by Décaries, Prud'hommes, Lemieux, Gougeons and a few owners with British names. Municipally the côte belonged to the village of Notre-Dame-de-Grâce-Ouest, created in 1876, from which Montreal West was detached in 1897. In 1903 P. Lemieux, Stanislas Viau, François-Xavier Décarie, Jérémie Prud'homme, J. H. McDonald and other freeholders petitioned the legislature for a municipality of their own, and a provincial statute sanctioned on April 25, 1903, erected the lands of the côte as the village of Côte Saint-Luc, bounded by the parishes of Saint-Laurent and Lachine, the municipalities of Saint-Pierre-aux-Liens and Montreal West, the Côte Saint-Luc road and the village of Côte-des-Neiges. Luc Prud'homme became the first mayor; his successor Pierre Lemieux, first elected in 1905, held the office for most of the next three decades. The house Lemieux built on Côte Saint-Luc Road in 1927 was bought by the village in 1946 and served as its town hall until 1964.

=== Village (1903–1945) ===
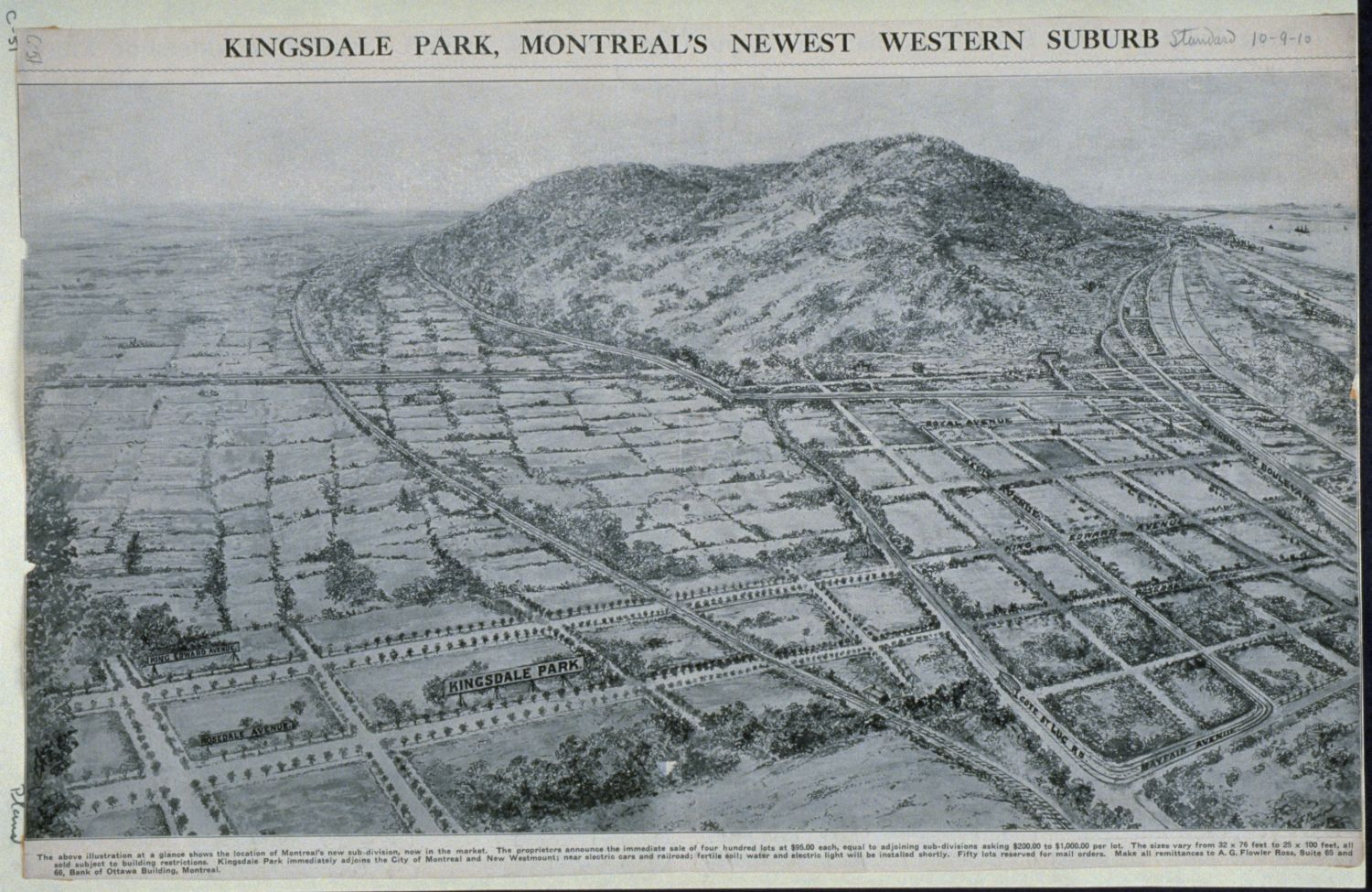
A 1910 advertisement for "Kingsdale Park", a subdivision on Côte St. Luc Road offering 400 lots at $95 each

Subdividers soon arrived. In 1910 an advertisement for "Kingsdale Park, Montreal's newest western suburb" on Côte St. Luc Road offered four hundred lots at $95 apiece with the promise that water and electric light "will be installed shortly", and Côte St-Luc Realty Limited was chartered in 1912 with a capital of $150,000 to deal in real estate of every kind. The most consequential of these schemes was a syndicate led by the financier Herbert Holt, which bought eight of the côte's original farm lots, in the municipality of Côte Saint-Luc, to subdivide into building lots and, by an act sanctioned on February 19, 1914, had them erected as the separate town of Hampstead, with the village's secretary-treasurer as returning officer for its first election. The separation of Hampstead—followed, according to the city library, by its annexation of a further 52.8 acres around Dufferin Avenue and Queen Mary Road in 1925—left the village's easternmost lots along Queen Mary Road, the present Macdonald Avenue exclave, cut off from the rest of its territory.

A wayside cross among the fields on Côte-Saint-Luc Road, photographed by Conrad Poirier in April 1938

Growth was slow for the next three decades. The village counted 303 people in 1911, 377 in 1921, 490 in 1931 and 776 in 1941. Its character, however, was changing. A French-Canadian, Catholic farming community became a mixed one: people of British origin made up 43 per cent of the population in 1931 and 54 per cent in 1941, nearly a fifth of the 1931 residents were British-born, and Roman Catholics were a minority by 1941. There was as yet no Jewish community—the 1931 census recorded no residents of the Jewish faith, and the 1941 census thirteen.

Boys beside a poster for a "Wings for Britain" horse show at Red Top Farm, 7071 Côte St. Luc Road, September 1941

The eastern end of the village along Queen Mary Road, where the first apartment building went up in 1921, was already integrated into Montreal's uniform tramway-fare zone under the 1918 contract between the city and the Montreal Tramways Company. The rest of the village remained rural into the 1940s—a horse show in aid of "Wings for Britain" was held at Red Top Farm on Côte St. Luc Road in 1941—and was crossed by the Canadian Pacific Railway, whose St. Luc Junction was described in 1924 as "a busy sorting yard".

=== Suburban boom (1945–1976) ===
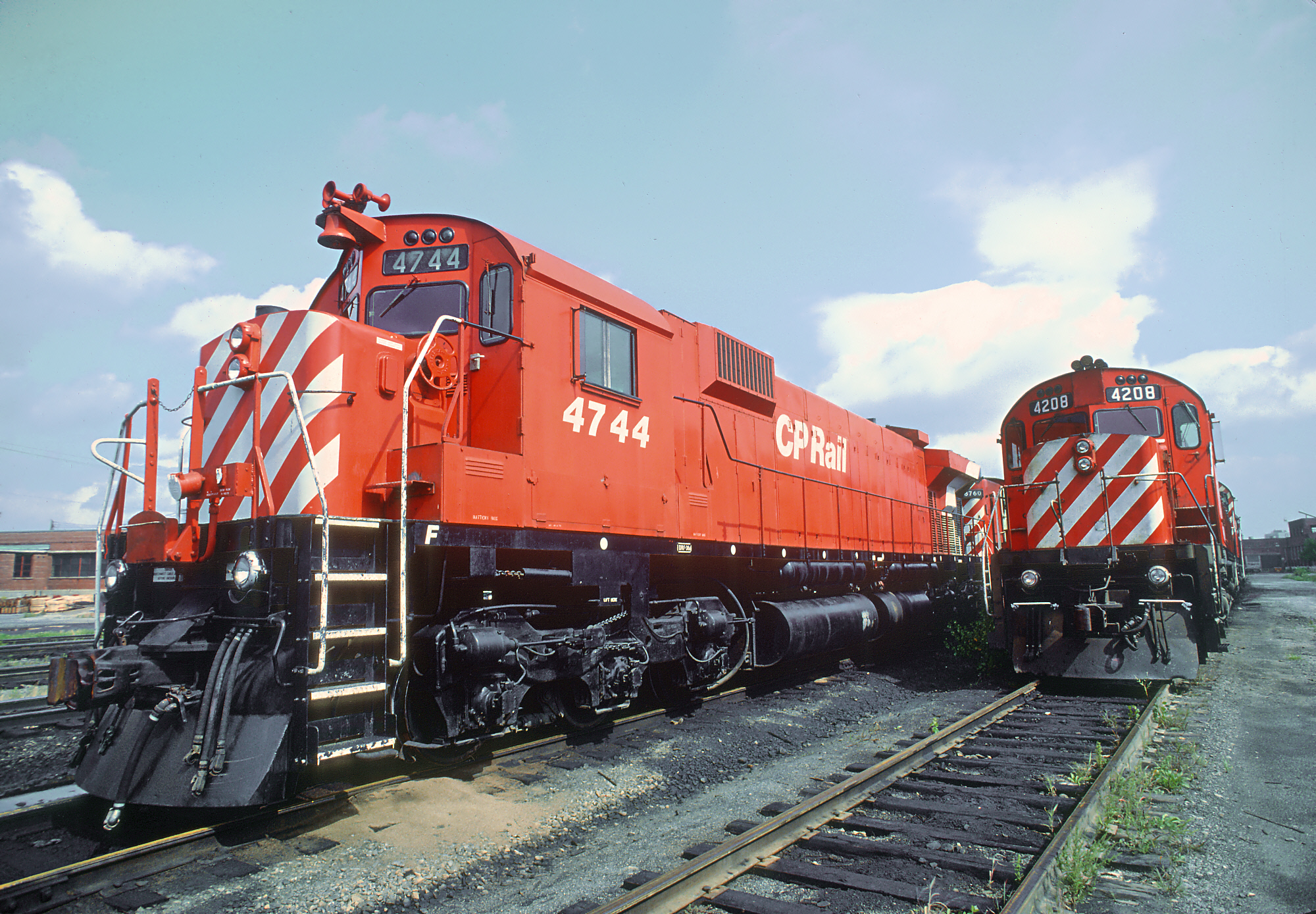
Canadian Pacific locomotives at St-Luc Yard in 1979. The yard, opened in 1950, occupies about a third of the city.

In November 1947 the Canadian Pacific Railway began building a new freight terminal on 682 acres (276 ha) of woods and fields in the northern part of the village, and on July 6, 1950, the federal transport minister, Lionel Chevrier, formally opened the $12-million St. Luc Yard by pulling the uncoupling pin that sent the first freight car rolling down its "hump". With more than 75 mi (121 km) of track and room for 4,869 cars, it replaced CP's Sortin, Outremont and Hochelaga yards as the railway's principal Montreal freight terminal and was described as the first fully electrically equipped and signalled hump yard in Canada. The following year the village asked to be reorganized as a town, telling the legislature that the sale of land as building lots, and the development bound to follow recent construction, had outgrown the powers of the Municipal Code; the town charter was sanctioned on December 19, 1951, when Côte Saint-Luc had 1,083 residents. The town's sewer system was built between 1951 and 1953.

Encouraged by the mortgage-loan insurance that the Canada Mortgage and Housing Corporation introduced in 1954, developers bought up the remaining farms and laid out streets of detached houses; the town's first master plan, adopted in 1954, imposed a rectangular grid that followed the boundaries of the old French-regime concessions, while a second plan in 1965 prescribed winding streets and cul-de-sacs for the districts still unbuilt. According to the research of the city library, the Wentworth Development Corporation bought Sydney Brown's farm between Wentworth and Palmer avenues in 1954 and sold its bungalows for $12,500, so that they became known locally as "the 12/5s". The population rose more than twelvefold in a decade, from 1,083 in 1951 to 5,914 in 1956 and 13,266 in 1961; in 1958, under Mayor J.-Adalbert Paris, the town had its charter amended to constitute it as the Cité de Côte Saint-Luc, on the ground that its population now justified city status. Planners of the 1960s expected far more: they projected a maximum population of 98,000, on the assumption of dense apartment districts and an industrial zone.

The newcomers were overwhelmingly Jewish. Montreal's Jewish population had been moving steadily north-west from the Main through Outremont to Snowdon and Côte-des-Neiges since the 1930s, and in the 1950s it spread into the suburbs beyond, including "Cote St. Luc, merely farmland when Jews first began to settle there". The 1951 census had found 34 Jews in the village; Beth Zion Congregation, the city's first synagogue, was planned in 1953 by ten men on behalf of about 25 Jewish families and opened in a six-room cottage on Hudson Avenue in 1956; by 1961 there were 8,307 Jews, 63 per cent of the population, and by 1971, 18,075, or 74 per cent. The Maimonides Hospital and Home for the Aged bought a seven-and-a-half-acre site in the city, on Caldwell Avenue, in 1964; the Protestant school board opened Wagar High School in 1963 for a student body that was largely Jewish; and the Jewish People's and Peretz Schools, on Wavell Road since 1960, opened Bialik High School there in 1972. The Catholic minority, for its part, received a parish of its own, Saint-Richard, in 1959, and its church on Guelph Road, still the city's only Catholic church, opened in 1963. In May 1963 Samuel Moskovitch, a 58-year-old corporation lawyer and long-time B'nai B'rith leader making his first foray into municipal politics, unseated Paris by 1,558 votes to 331 to become the city's first Jewish mayor. The election turned on a provincial inquiry into the city's purchase of a tract of former CP land at nearly three times the price the vendor had paid four months earlier—a transaction the municipal affairs minister, Pierre Laporte, said "smells badly of speculation"—and voters had thrown out, 984 to 98, a $960,000 loan by-law to build a municipal garage and police and fire station on the site. Moskovitch was never opposed at the polls again during his thirteen years in office.

In October 1959 property owners voted, 498 to 322, to borrow $655,000 to replace the level crossing on Westminster Avenue with an underpass beneath the CP tracks; it was officially opened in December 1960. A second underpass, at Cavendish Boulevard, was opened in June 1965, at a ceremony where the city called on its neighbours to "follow its lead" by extending the boulevard north across the rail yards to Côte-de-Liesse Road—a link that was never built. The underpass opened the land north of the tracks to development, and over the following decade the Cavendish sector filled with eighteen-storey towers, low-rise apartment clusters and, in August 1973, the Cavendish Mall, anchored by Eaton's and Steinberg's. The city's public library opened in 1966 in a storefront of the Côte Saint-Luc Shopping Centre, The Suburban, which describes itself today as Quebec's largest English-language weekly, was founded in 1963 in a basement on Davies Avenue, and in 1975 Côte Saint-Luc became, according to The Canadian Jewish News, the first Quebec municipality to twin with an Israeli city when Moskovitch led a delegation to Ashkelon. Moskovitch died on May 24, 1976, after collapsing at a golf club in Sainte-Thérèse minutes into a speech at a friend's anniversary party; the city declared a civic holiday for his funeral and named its newly built arena after him.

=== Language politics and the Lang years (1976–1998) ===
Bernard Lang, an engineer who had sat on council since 1963, won the mayoralty in 1976 in the city's first contested election in thirteen years, and held it for twenty-two years. By then every member of council was Jewish, and the council acted on several occasions on issues affecting the Jewish community: in the late 1960s it had pressed Quebec to let Jews vote for and sit on the Protestant School Board of Greater Montreal, whose schools in the city were 90 per cent Jewish; it asked the province to remove the "J" designation identifying Jewish taxpayers on assessment rolls and school-tax bills; it asked Prime Minister Pierre Trudeau, the local member of Parliament, to press for the release of the Soviet dissident Anatoly Shcharansky; and it named a street for Raoul Wallenberg. Marking the city's eightieth anniversary in 1983, the Canadian Jewish News called it a "shtetl".

The same years brought Quebec's language laws. Côte Saint-Luc is one of the municipalities recognized under the Charter of the French Language as having "bilingual status", the recognition that allows a municipality to serve its residents in English as well as French; the reconstituted city's recognition dates from November 2, 2005. In 1991 Lang told a synagogue audience that Bill 178, which banned languages other than French on outdoor commercial signs, was "fascism at its worst". The provincial riding of D'Arcy-McGee, which includes Côte Saint-Luc, returned the strongest "No" vote in Quebec in both the 1980 (95.9 per cent) and 1995 (96.4 per cent) referendums on sovereignty, and in 1989 it elected Robert Libman, leader of the newly founded anglophone-rights Equality Party, to the National Assembly with 58 per cent of the vote. After the narrow federalist victory of 1995, Côte Saint-Luc became the first municipality to adopt a "staying Canadian" resolution. On November 4, 1996, before a council chamber so full that more than 200 people were turned away at the door, council voted unanimously, on a motion by Councillor Mitchell Brownstein, that the city would hold its own referendum on remaining in Canada if Quebec voted to secede and Ottawa failed to hold a national referendum with a clear question. Hampstead followed within weeks, while Westmount's mayor refused to take part in what he called an illegal and divisive exercise; by February 2000, according to testimony before a Commons committee, more than forty-eight Quebec municipalities representing nearly a million people had adopted similar resolutions, promoted by federalist "unity" groups and by advocates of the partition of Quebec.

Lang's administration built the city's present civic core: a combined city hall and library on Cavendish Boulevard, opposite the mall, opened in 1986, and was renamed the Bernard Lang Civic Centre when he retired in 1998. Lang also opposed the extension of Cavendish Boulevard north across the rail yards, which the Montreal Urban Community had written into its development plan in the early 1980s—"We don't need it, we don't want it, we can't afford it," a councillor later recalled him saying—and the city did not reverse its position until 1998. The Mount Sinai Hospital, founded in 1909 as a tuberculosis sanatorium in the Laurentians, moved to Côte Saint-Luc in 1990 as a long-term and palliative-care hospital. According to the city's planning program, the exclave north of Hampstead that contains Décarie Square was added to the city in 1994 following discussions with Montreal.

=== Merger and demerger (1998–2006) ===
Robert Libman, by then Quebec regional director of B'nai Brith Canada, was acclaimed mayor on October 9, 1998, when no one else filed to succeed Lang, and took office on November 9. Two years later the Parti Québécois government's Bill 170, passed on December 19, 2000, ordered the amalgamation of every municipality on the island into a single city of Montreal. Côte Saint-Luc was merged on January 1, 2002, with Hampstead and Montreal West into the borough of Côte-Saint-Luc–Hampstead–Montréal-Ouest; in the November 2001 election of the new city's first council, Libman and councillor Dida Berku won the borough's two seats on the Montreal city council on Gérald Tremblay's ticket, with Libman taking 87 per cent of the ballots cast, and Anthony Housefather was elected borough councillor. Libman sat on Montreal's executive committee, where he was the first member responsible for the new Office de consultation publique de Montréal.

When the Jean Charest government allowed the former municipalities to vote on reconstitution, Côte Saint-Luc's referendum on June 20, 2004, produced 9,128 votes to leave Montreal against 1,359 to stay—87 per cent of valid ballots. Turnout was 47 per cent, and the "yes" votes amounted to 40.4 per cent of the 22,575 registered voters, above the threshold the law required: a majority of valid votes amounting to at least 35 per cent of the electors on the list. The city was reconstituted on January 1, 2006, as one of the fifteen reconstituted municipalities that, with Montreal, form the new urban agglomeration of Montreal, which exercises the powers over police, fire protection, water, transit, assessment and the arterial road network. In the election of November 2005 that chose the reconstituted city's first council, Housefather defeated Lang, who had come out of retirement at nearly 80 to contest it, by 6,366 votes to 1,397.

=== Independent again (2006–present) ===
Housefather was returned by acclamation in 2009 and 2013 and resigned in November 2015 on his election to the House of Commons for Mount Royal; Mitchell Brownstein, a lawyer who had sat on council since 1990, was acclaimed mayor in March 2016. Brownstein defeated Libman's comeback bid in 2017 and councillor David Tordjman in 2021, but in November 2025 Tordjman, a civil engineer, unseated him by a single vote on the updated count and by seven votes—4,241 to 4,234—after a judicial recount supervised by the Court of Quebec.

Demolition of about 40 per cent of the Cavendish Mall, which had lost Eaton's in 1998, began in 2010 to make way for houses and townhouses, and the remainder was renamed Quartier Cavendish; an $18-million Aquatic and Community Centre opened in 2011; and the population, which had grown only slowly since the mid-1980s, rose by 6.3 per cent between 2016 and 2021. A planning program adopted in May 2026 identifies the potential for some 4,000 new dwellings and a population increase of more than 35 per cent, mostly through the gradual replacement of the city's shopping centres by mixed-use streets.

The council has continued to take public stands on provincial legislation affecting minorities. Housefather campaigned against the proposed Quebec Charter of Values in 2013, and the city hosted a rally against Bill 21 in 2019. When Bill 96 (2022) provided that municipalities would lose their bilingual status unless a majority of residents had English as their mother tongue or their council passed a resolution to keep it, the Office québécois de la langue française notified Côte Saint-Luc in December 2022 that only 46.0 per cent of its residents met the language test; council adopted the required resolution ten days later, and in June 2023 the city joined twenty-two other bilingual municipalities in a Superior Court challenge to parts of the law. The court declined to suspend the contested provisions in October 2024 while the case proceeds.

== Geography ==
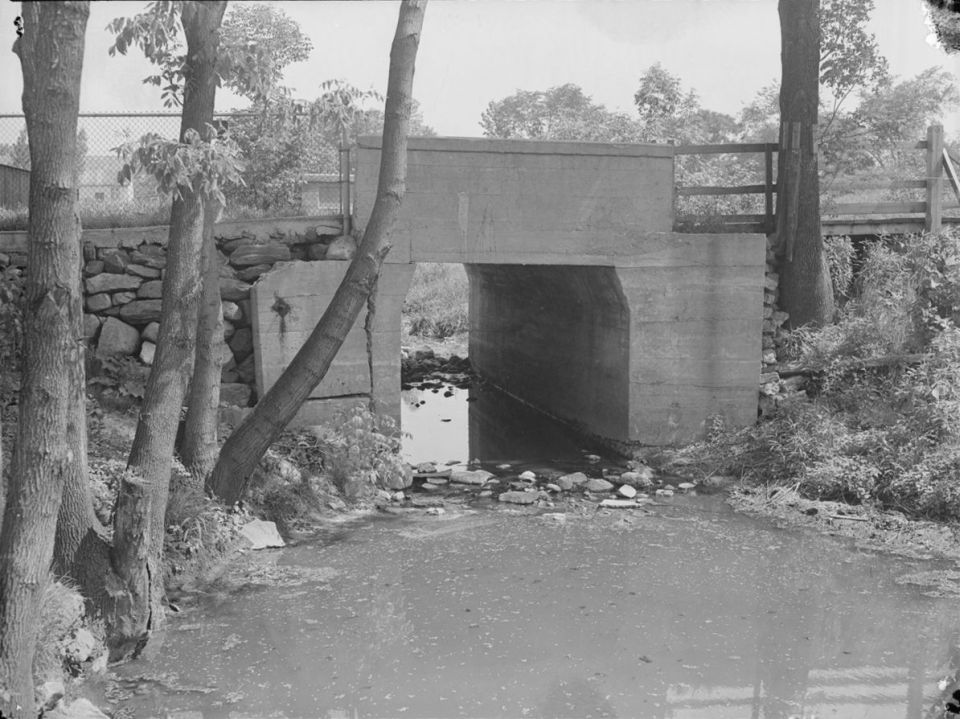
A stone-and-concrete bridge over the Saint-Pierre River in Côte Saint-Luc, photographed by Conrad Poirier in June 1938; the river has since been buried

Côte Saint-Luc lies in the west-central part of the Island of Montreal. Together with Hampstead and Montreal West it forms an enclave within the city of Montreal, whose boroughs of Côte-des-Neiges–Notre-Dame-de-Grâce, Lachine and Saint-Laurent surround the three towns; it meets the Town of Mount Royal only at its northern corner. The municipality itself is in three pieces. The main body is separated from two small exclaves by Hampstead: the larger, north of Hampstead beside the Décarie Expressway, contains the Décarie Square shopping centre and the apartment towers and houses of David-Lewis Street, and the smaller consists of the apartment buildings along Macdonald Avenue, east of Hampstead. Statistics Canada measures the city's land area at 7.04 km^{2} (2.72 sq mi); the provincial municipal directory gives 6.81 km^{2} (2.63 sq mi).

Almost a third of the territory—close to 200 ha (490 acres) in the north—is occupied by the St-Luc yard of Canadian Pacific Kansas City, an intermodal and classification yard that operates around the clock and which the city describes as a source of noise, vibration and hazardous-goods risk as well as a barrier to development. Because the yard and the rail lines that feed it surround the main part of the city, the underpasses at Cavendish Boulevard and Westminster Avenue are its only two road exits across the tracks; four emergency gates can be opened only in coordination with the railways. The little Saint-Pierre River, which once ran through the côte and was still crossed by a stone bridge in 1938, has since been buried, along with most of the city's other streams; a tributary ran along Côte Saint-Luc Road and through the site of the Meadowbrook Golf Club, a 57 ha (140 acres) course straddling the Lachine–Côte Saint-Luc boundary that has been the object of a development battle for decades. Côte Saint-Luc rezoned its portion of the course from residential to recreational in 2000; the owner, Meadowbrook Groupe Pacific, which bought the course in 2006 hoping to build 1,600 homes, lost a $44-million suit against Montreal when the Supreme Court of Canada refused leave to appeal in May 2020, while its separate action against the Côte Saint-Luc rezoning was still before the courts in 2022.

Apartment towers on Marc-Chagall Avenue; more than half of the city's dwellings are in buildings of five storeys or more

The built-up area records the city's history in its street pattern: a grid of 1950s bungalows in the north-west, the loops and cul-de-sacs of the 1960s and 1970s around Kildare Road and the arena, and the towers and townhouses of the Cavendish sector, the last large sector to be developed. The largest share of the housing stock dates from 1961 to 1980, and 56 per cent of dwellings are apartments in buildings of five or more storeys.

== Demographics ==
Historical populations

| Year | Pop. | ±% |
|---|---|---|
| 1818 | 209 | — |
| 1911 | 303 | +45.0% |
| 1921 | 377 | +24.4% |
| 1931 | 490 | +30.0% |
| 1941 | 776 | +58.4% |
| 1951 | 1,083 | +39.6% |
| 1956 | 5,914 | +446.1% |
| 1961 | 13,266 | +124.3% |
| 1966 | 20,546 | +54.9% |
| 1971 | 24,375 | +18.6% |

| Year | Pop. | ±% |
|---|---|---|
| 1976 | 25,721 | +5.5% |
| 1981 | 27,531 | +7.0% |
| 1986 | 28,582 | +3.8% |
| 1991 | 28,700 | +0.4% |
| 1996 | 29,705 | +3.5% |
| 2001 | 30,244 | +1.8% |
| 2006 | 31,395 | +3.8% |
| 2011 | 32,321 | +2.9% |
| 2016 | 32,448 | +0.4% |
| 2021 | 34,504 | +6.3% |

1818: Sulpician parish count. 1911–1971: Statistics Canada historical bulletins. 1976–1996: census publications. 2001–2021: census profiles. The 1991 figure is the count within the boundaries of that year; adjusted to the 1996 boundaries it was 30,126.

In the 2021 Census of Population conducted by Statistics Canada, Côte Saint-Luc had a population of 34,504 living in 14,603 of its 15,548 total private dwellings, a change of 6.3% from its 2016 population of 32,448. With a land area of 7.04 km^{2} (2.72 sq mi), it had a population density of 4,901.1/km^{2} (12,693.9/sq mi) in 2021.

The city's population is markedly older than Quebec's. In 2021, 28.7 per cent of residents were aged 65 or over and 6.3 per cent were 85 or over, against 20.6 and 2.5 per cent for the province; the median age was 44.8. The population has nonetheless been getting younger: the median age was 50.5 in 2001 and has fallen at every census since. Just over half of households rent their homes, 36 per cent of households consist of one person, and the median total household income in 2020 was $72,500.

Forty-three per cent of residents in 2021 were immigrants, the largest groups having been born in Morocco (2,295), Iran (1,350), the Philippines (1,320), Russia (695) and Romania (530), and 27 per cent belonged to a visible minority, chiefly Black (2,020), West Asian (1,720) and Filipino (1,685) residents. Among ethnic or cultural origins, "Jewish" (9,500) was the most frequent response, followed by Moroccan (4,130), Russian (2,745), Canadian (2,285), Polish (2,035), Iranian (1,730), Italian (1,525), Filipino (1,525), Romanian (1,410) and Israeli (1,355).

=== Language ===
English is the mother tongue of about 40 per cent of residents and French of 19 per cent, while a third report another first language, the largest being Russian, Persian, Hebrew, Spanish, Romanian, Arabic, Tagalog, Italian and Yiddish. English is the language spoken most often at home by 55 per cent of residents and French by 16 per cent, and it is the first official language spoken of 63 per cent; about 64 per cent of residents can carry on a conversation in both official languages. The city is recognized under section 29.1 of the Charter of the French Language as a municipality that may serve its residents in English as well as French, a status it kept in 2023 after the Office québécois de la langue française found that 46.0 per cent of residents had English as their mother tongue in the 2021 census. (Note: The Office's figure is drawn from the same census but is computed on a different basis from the single-response figures in the table below.)

Mother tongue, 2021 census (single responses; multiple responses shown as one line)
| Language | Population | Share |
|---|---|---|
| English | 13,515 | 39.8% |
| French | 6,465 | 19.0% |
| Russian | 1,655 | 4.9% |
| Persian | 1,650 | 4.9% |
| Hebrew | 950 | 2.8% |
| Spanish | 810 | 2.4% |
| Romanian | 680 | 2.0% |
| Arabic | 660 | 1.9% |
| Tagalog | 590 | 1.7% |
| Italian | 565 | 1.7% |
| Yiddish | 495 | 1.5% |
| Multiple responses | 2,600 | 7.7% |

=== Religion and the Jewish community ===
Religion, 2001–2021 (2011 figures are from the voluntary National Household Survey)
| | 2001 | 2011 | 2021 |
|---|---|---|---|
| Jewish | 69.1% | 60.1% | 52.9% |
| Catholic | 12.2% | 13.1% | 13.6% |
| Muslim | 4.8% | 3.9% | 7.0% |
| No religion | 5.2% | 9.6% | 12.2% |

According to the Jewish community's own census analyses, Côte Saint-Luc has the largest Jewish population of any district or suburb in the Montreal metropolitan area. Those analyses counted 19,785 Jews in the city in 2001, 19,395 in 2011 and 18,180 in 2021 (the definitions used differ slightly from one report to the next), about a fifth of all the Jews in the region; the community peaked at about 22,300 in 1991 and has since declined slowly, in part because of the deaths of elderly residents. Measured as a share of the population, Jews formed 74 per cent of residents in 1971, 69 per cent in 2001 and 53 per cent in 2021; only neighbouring Hampstead, at 63 per cent in 2021, has a higher proportion, and Federation CJA describes the two towns as having "the highest densities of Jews in the country".

Côte Saint-Luc has the largest number of foreign-born Jews in Montreal (6,105 in 2021) and the largest share of the region's Sephardic community (6,790), which is largely of Moroccan origin; in 2011 French was the home language of nearly a fifth of the city's Jews. It also has Montreal's largest concentrations of Israelis and of Jews from Eastern Europe, and one of its largest of Jews from the former Soviet Union, who arrived mainly in the 1990s and 2000s. More than a third of the city's Jews—6,575 in 2021—are aged 65 or over, the largest concentration of Jewish seniors in the region. The food court of the Cavendish Mall was for years a daily meeting place for the city's elderly residents, among them many Holocaust survivors.

Muslims, at 7 per cent of residents in 2021, are the largest religious minority after Christians, who make up about a quarter of residents; the Catholic parish of Saint-Richard has the city's only Catholic church. The city has "a high number of places of worship", mostly synagogues, and demand for more has occasionally divided residents: in 2017 council approved, over neighbours' objections, a rezoning to allow a Sephardic kollel to build beside the Quartier Cavendish, then withdrew it after residents petitioned for a referendum, and finally rejected a revised project in 2021.

== Economy ==
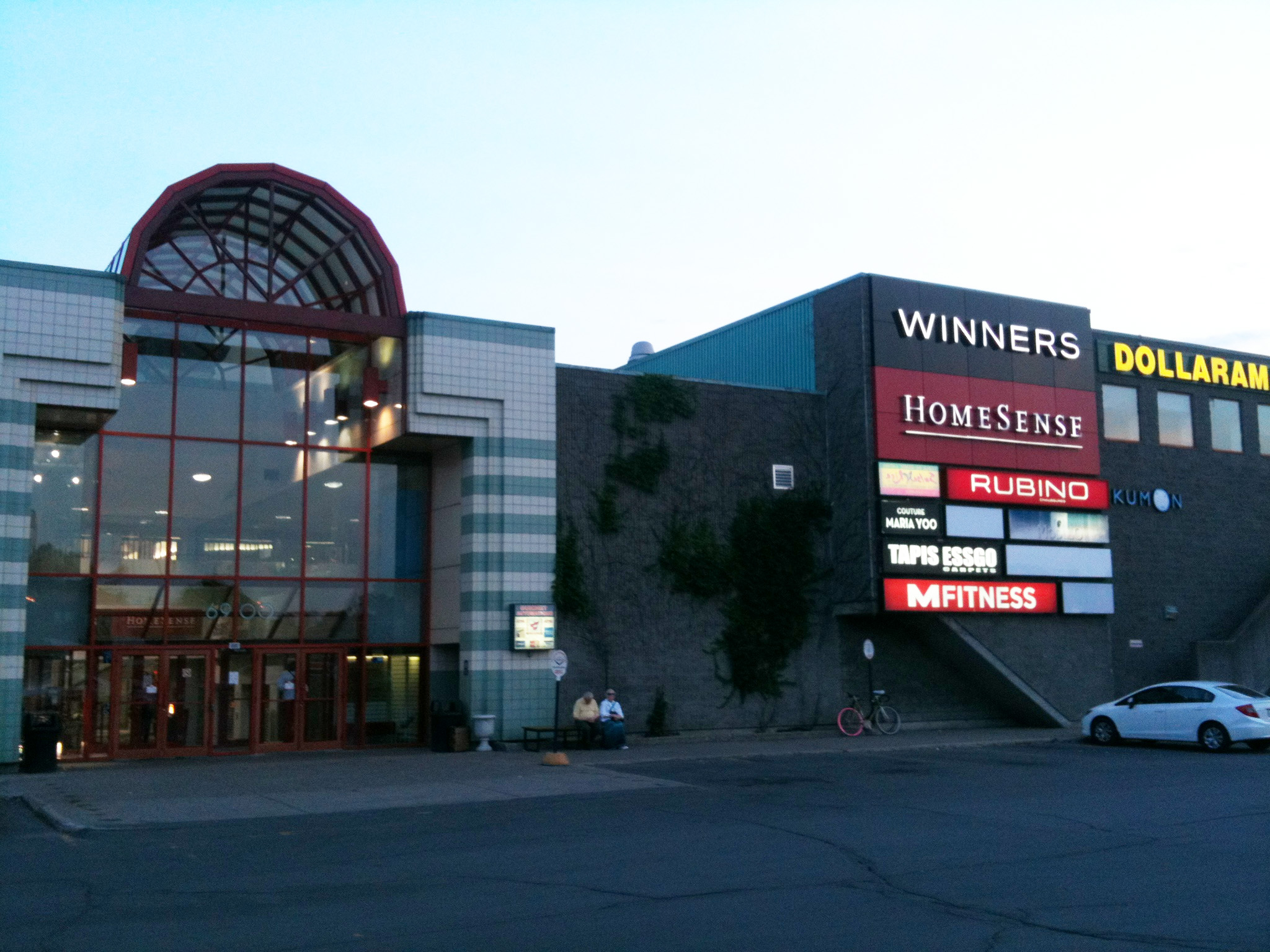
Décarie Square (1977), in the city's northern exclave

Côte Saint-Luc is almost entirely residential. Commerce is concentrated in three shopping centres and along Westminster Avenue, Caldwell Avenue and Kildare Road. The Côte Saint-Luc Shopping Centre on Côte Saint-Luc Road, built in 1956 and enclosed in 1970, is the oldest of the three; the Cavendish Mall, opened in August 1973 by a partnership led by the developer Roy Salomon and his brother Richard, with Eaton's as its anchor tenant alongside Steinberg's, Miracle Mart and Warshaw's, had some 400,000 sq ft (37,000 m^{2}) and up to eighty stores in its heyday, before competition, an ageing clientele and the closure of Eaton's in 1998 led its owners to begin demolishing two-fifths of it for housing in 2010; and Décarie Square, opened in 1977 beside the Décarie Expressway, houses shops and restaurants, a medical clinic, offices and a private college, with several vacant spaces. The owners of all three have presented plans to replace them over the next decades with mixed-use districts of housing above shops, and the city's 2026 planning program sets minimum densities for the redevelopment of the Décarie Square and Quartier Cavendish sites.

The other economic presence is the St-Luc yard, which links Canadian Pacific's eastern and western networks and handles wood, chemicals, plastics, metals, minerals, consumer goods and oil, and to which a transload terminal for forest products, metals and aggregates was added in September 2020. In 2016 Mayor Brownstein and a coalition led by former mayor Libman explored the relocation of the yard off the island, valuing its land at more than $1 billion, but the railway has since expanded its operations there and the city's long-term plans treat the site as a mixed-use district only if the yard is ever moved. Of residents commuting to work in 2021, three-quarters drove and fewer than a fifth took public transit.

== Government and public services ==
City hall on Cavendish Boulevard, part of the Bernard Lang Civic Centre, which the city shares with its public library

Côte Saint-Luc is governed by a mayor and eight councillors, one for each electoral district, elected for four-year terms on the first Sunday of November, as in every Quebec municipality since 2005. Municipal elections have often gone uncontested: the mayor was acclaimed in 1998, 2009, 2013 and 2016, and most council seats went uncontested in 2009 and 2013. The council elected on November 2, 2025 is listed below.

| Position | Name |
|---|---|
| Mayor | David Tordjman |
| District 1 | Oren Sebag |
| District 2 | Mike Cohen |
| District 3 | Jamie Fabian |
| District 4 | Steven Erdelyi |
| District 5 | Mitch Kujavsky |
| District 6 | Lior Azerad |
| District 7 | Sidney Benizri |
| District 8 | Andee Shuster |

=== Mayors ===
- Luc Prud'homme (1903–1905)
- Pierre Lemieux (1905–1909, 1912–1938)
- François-Xavier Décarie (1909–1912)
- Frederick D. Lamont (1938–1939)
- Donald Fletcher (1939–1951)
- John H. Fyon (1951–1953)
- J.-Adalbert Paris (1953–1963)
- Samuel Moskovitch (1963–1976)
- Bernard Lang (1976–1998)
- Robert Libman (1998–2001)
- Borough of Montreal (2002–2005)
- Anthony Housefather (2006–2015)
- Mitchell Brownstein (2016–2025)
- David Tordjman (2025–present)

Sources: village and town mayors, Moskovitch, Lang, Libman, Housefather, Brownstein and Tordjman.

=== Agglomeration and municipal services ===
Since its reconstitution in 2006 Côte Saint-Luc has been one of the sixteen "related municipalities" of the urban agglomeration of Montreal, of which Montreal is the central municipality. The agglomeration council, controlled by the city of Montreal, exercises the powers the law reserves to it—property assessment, public transit, the arterial road network, water supply and purification, waste disposal, the municipal court, social housing and the "public security" functions of police, fire protection and first-responder services—and bills each related municipality an aliquot share of the cost in proportion to its fiscal potential. Powers not assigned to the agglomeration, among them local streets, parks and recreation, the library, zoning, waste collection and by-law enforcement, are exercised by the city itself.

Côte Saint-Luc runs several public-safety services of its own. It had its own police force until January 1, 1972, when policing on the island was taken over by the Montreal Urban Community; it is now served by Neighbourhood Station 9 of the Montreal police, which also covers Hampstead and Montreal West. Firefighting, long a duty of the police, passed to a municipal fire department in 1972 and to the Montreal fire department when all the island's fire services were amalgamated on January 1, 2002; the city's station on Côte Saint-Luc Road, opened in 1961, became Montreal's Station 78. A municipal Public Security department enforces by-laws and patrols parks and buildings, and since 2006 it has been supplemented by Volunteer Citizens on Patrol (vCOP), a programme of resident volunteers in marked vehicles that the city says was the first of its kind in Quebec.

A Public Security vehicle. The city runs its own by-law enforcement, volunteer patrols and volunteer first-responder service.

Côte Saint-Luc Emergency Medical Services (EMS) is an all-volunteer first responder corps founded in 1965 as the Emergency Measures Organization and providing pre-ambulance emergency care since 1980. With a full-time director, a round-the-clock dispatch centre and more than ninety volunteers, it answers over 3,000 calls a year, typically arriving within four minutes, ahead of the Urgences-santé ambulances that provide advanced care and transport; the city says it is the only volunteer first-responder service of its kind in Quebec. The city has said the service would have disappeared after the merger: a 2003 collective agreement between Montreal and its firefighters gave the fire department a monopoly on first-response calls, and the December 2005 agglomeration decree protected the EMS only until the end of 2008. After the city lobbied the National Assembly, the government's Bill 22 of 2008 amended the agglomeration act to declare first-responder services on Côte Saint-Luc's territory a local rather than an agglomeration power, exempting the city from paying for Montreal's first-responder scheme.

The council has also used its by-law powers in ways that drew attention beyond the city. In 2012 it adopted what CBC News described as Quebec's toughest outdoor anti-smoking by-law, banning smoking within 20 metres of playgrounds and sports fields, and on June 1, 2020, during the first wave of the COVID-19 pandemic, it became, by its own account, the first municipality in Canada to make face masks mandatory in shops and public buildings.

=== Representation ===
Federally, Côte Saint-Luc lies in the riding of Mount Royal, held by the Liberals without interruption since 1940. Its members have included Pierre Trudeau, who represented it from 1965 to 1984, including his years as prime minister, Sheila Finestone (1984–1999), Irwin Cotler (1999–2015) and, since 2015, former mayor Anthony Housefather. Provincially it lies in D'Arcy-McGee, represented by the Liberals Victor Goldbloom (1966–1979), Herbert Marx (1979–1989), Lawrence Bergman (1994–2014), David Birnbaum (2014–2022) and Elisabeth Prass (from 2022), and, between Marx and Bergman, by Robert Libman of the Equality Party (1989–1994; an independent from December 1993).

=== Twin city ===
Côte Saint-Luc has been twinned with Ashkelon, Israel, since 1975, when Mayor Moskovitch led a delegation to the twinning ceremony there; after his death the city raised $135,000 for a sports complex at Ashkelon's ORT school dedicated to his memory in 1981. Ashkelon Crescent was named in 1985 and the Ashkelon Gardens behind the library in 1988, and the city raised money for bomb shelters in its twin during the rocket attacks of 2009 and 2014.

== Culture and community life ==
=== Library and recreation ===
The Eleanor London Côte Saint-Luc Public Library was founded in 1966 by its first librarian, Eleanor London, who was hired in 1965 to build a library that did not yet exist and opened it in a second-floor storefront of the Côte Saint-Luc Shopping Centre; it moved in 1986 into the new civic centre on Cavendish Boulevard, which she helped design, and was renamed in her honour shortly before her retirement after thirty-six years. London insisted that the library open every day of the year from 10 a.m. to 10 p.m., and its services and hours made it, in the Gazette's words, "the envy of Montreal residents"; it remained open 365 days a year after weekend evening hours were trimmed in 2016, and it marked its sixtieth anniversary in 2026.

The Human Rights Walkway in Pierre Elliott Trudeau Park

The city maintains about thirty parks, the Samuel Moskovitch Arena on Mackle Road, and the Aquatic and Community Centre on Parkhaven Avenue, an $18-million complex with indoor pools, fitness rooms and seniors' lounges opened in August 2011 beside the outdoor Parkhaven pool. Centennial Park on Mackle Road was renamed Pierre Elliott Trudeau Park in 2001; on Canada Day that year Trudeau's son Sacha unveiled a bronze bust of the former prime minister, who had been the area's member of Parliament for nineteen years. The park contains the Human Rights Walkway, inaugurated in September 2000, where plaques are added to honour defenders of human rights: René Cassin and John Peters Humphrey first, then Raoul Wallenberg, Jules Deschênes, Maxwell Cohen, Mary Two-Axe Earley, Helen Suzman, Antonio Lamer, Miep Gies, the Canadian Jewish activists who campaigned for Soviet, Syrian and Ethiopian Jews, Jackie Robinson, Nelson Mandela, Irwin Cotler, Roméo Dallaire, Viola Desmond, the Indigenous advocate Nakuset and, in 2025, Herbert Marx, Richard French and Clifford Lincoln, the three ministers who resigned from the Quebec cabinet in December 1988 in protest against the use of the notwithstanding clause to override a Supreme Court ruling on minority language rights.

=== Religious and community institutions ===
Places of worship are mostly synagogues. Beth Zion Congregation on Hudson Avenue, the oldest, grew from twenty-five families in 1953 to nearly a thousand by 1965 and was led for more than half a century by Rabbi Sidney Shoham, for whom the stretch of Hudson Avenue in front of the synagogue was renamed in 2016. Tifereth Beth David Jerusalem on Baily Road, a Modern Orthodox congregation, brought together four congregations from the old immigrant neighbourhoods—Beth David, Tifereth Jerusalem, Beth Itzchak and Kehal Yeshurun—whose roots reach back to the 1880s. Beth Israel Beth Aaron on Mackle Road and the Sephardic congregation Or Hahayim are among the others, and the Catholic parish of Saint-Richard on Guelph Road, founded in 1959, has the city's only Catholic church.

Two institutions serve the elderly: the Donald Berman Maimonides Geriatric Centre on Caldwell Avenue, descended from the Montreal Hebrew Old People's and Sheltering Home founded in 1910, which moved to a seven-and-a-half-acre site in the city in the 1960s and has had 387 beds since 1983, and the Mount Sinai Hospital on Cavendish Boulevard, a long-term and palliative-care hospital that moved from the Laurentians in 1990. Since about 2010 an all-volunteer Cats Committee has run a trap-neuter-return programme for the city's stray cats, proposed by Councillor Mike Cohen at a time when a local veterinarian estimated their number at 10,000; the city cut its funding for the programme in 2024.

== Education ==
Public schooling is provided by the Centre de services scolaire Marguerite-Bourgeoys, which runs two French-language elementary schools, École de la Mosaïque on McMurray Avenue and École des Amis-du-Monde on Mackle Road, and by the English Montreal School Board, which runs Merton School, a French-immersion elementary school on Robinson Avenue, the alternative Mountainview High School on Côte Saint-Luc Road, and, in the former Wagar High School building on Parkhaven Avenue, John Grant High School for students with special needs and the Wagar Adult Education Centre. Wagar, named for a Protestant school commissioner, opened in 1963 and had more than 1,700 students at its peak in the 1970s; it closed in 2005, and later attempts to reopen an English public high school in the building failed, leaving the city without one. The city's private schools are Jewish day schools: the Hebrew Academy on Kellert Avenue, in the city since the late 1970s and in its present building since 1992; JPPS–Bialik on Kildare Road, where Bialik High School moved from Wavell Road in 1984; the French-language École Maïmonide, founded in 1969 by the francophone Sephardic community, on Parkhaven Avenue; and the Yeshiva Yavne on Wavell Road.

== Transportation ==
A level crossing on Côte-Saint-Luc Road in February 1937; the Westminster and Cavendish crossings of the CP line were replaced by underpasses in 1960 and 1965

Only two roads cross the CP tracks out of the main part of the city: Cavendish Boulevard, known as King George Boulevard until 1969, and Westminster Avenue, each of which passes under the railway. The city has no metro or commuter-rail station. It is served by STM bus routes 104 Cavendish, 162 Westminster, 138 Notre-Dame-de-Grâce, 161 Van Horne, 103 Monkland and 420 Express Notre-Dame-de-Grâce; the nearest train station is Montréal-Ouest station, just across the boundary, and the city has asked the regional transit authority for a station of its own on the Saint-Jérôme line, which crosses its territory.

The northward extension of Cavendish Boulevard across the rail yards to Saint-Laurent, a distance of about 1.3 km (0.81 mi), has been debated since the early 1960s, when the city's own plans foresaw the link being completed in time for Expo 67. It appeared in the Montreal Urban Community's development plan in the early 1980s, but Mayor Lang opposed opening the city to through traffic and the project stalled until the city reversed its position in 1998. Montreal put the link in its capital budget in 2015, and in 2017 the province transferred the former Blue Bonnets racetrack to the city on condition that it build the extension; a 2018 gas leak that partially blocked the Cavendish underpass gridlocked the city for hours. In 2022 the Valérie Plante administration filed a project notice for a $200-million "urban boulevard" with reserved transit lanes, bicycle paths and only one lane of car traffic in each direction—a design Côte Saint-Luc criticized as too narrow—but dropped the link from its Namur–Hippodrome plan in 2024 without completing the environmental review. The administration elected in November 2025 revived the project, and in mid-2026 the agglomeration council authorized the expropriation of land in Mount Royal and Saint-Laurent for a first phase linking Royalmount Avenue to Cavendish, though the final alignment through the yards remained undetermined.

== Notable people ==
- Judy Batalion, author of The Light of Days, born in Côte Saint-Luc
- Barry Blitt, The New Yorker cover artist and 2020 Pulitzer Prize winner, born in Côte Saint-Luc and a Wagar High School graduate
- Ricky Blitt, screenwriter and producer (Family Guy, The Ringer), who grew up in the city
- Gary Carter, Montreal Expos catcher and Hall of Famer, who lived in the city during his final season with the Expos in 1992; the city renamed a baseball field in Pierre Elliott Trudeau Park for him in 2012
- Jamie Elman and Eli Batalion, creators of the Yiddish web comedy Yidlife Crisis, who grew up in the city and learned Yiddish at Bialik High School
- Bianca Farella, member of Canada's rugby sevens team at the 2016 Summer Olympics, a native of the city
- Anthony Housefather, mayor from 2006 to 2015 and member of Parliament for Mount Royal since 2015
- Irving Layton, poet, who lived on Kildare Road from 1950 to 1958 and died at the Maimonides Geriatric Centre in 2006; Irving Layton Avenue is named for him
- Alison Levine, boccia player ranked second in the world in 2019, who grew up in the city
- Robert Libman, co-founder and first leader of the Equality Party, MNA for D'Arcy-McGee and mayor from 1998 to 2001
- Steven Pinker, cognitive psychologist and author, who grew up in Montreal West and Côte Saint-Luc
- Elisabeth Prass, MNA for D'Arcy-McGee, who grew up in the city
- Cy Strulovitch, basketball player at the 1948 Summer Olympics, born in Côte Saint-Luc

== See also ==
- List of anglophone communities in Quebec
- List of enclaves and exclaves
- History of the Jews in Montreal
