= Anthony Housefather =

Canadian politician (born 1970)

Anthony Housefather MP

Member of Parliament for Mount Royal
- Incumbent
- Assumed office November 4, 2015
- Preceded by: Irwin Cotler

Mayor of Côte Saint-Luc
- In office November 7, 2005 – November 4, 2015
- Preceded by: Robert Libman
- Succeeded by: Mitchell Brownstein

Councillor for the Borough of Côte-Saint-Luc–Hampstead–Montreal West
- In office 2001–2005

President of Alliance Quebec
- In office 2000–2001
- Preceded by: William Johnson
- Succeeded by: Brent Tyler

Town Councillor in Hampstead
- In office 1994–2001

Personal details
- Born: January 25, 1970 (age 56) Montreal, Canada
- Party: Liberal
- Education: McGill University; Concordia University
- Website: Liberal Party of Canada

Anthony Housefather (born January 25, 1970) is a Canadian politician, lawyer, and athlete who has served as a Member of Parliament representing the riding of Mount Royal on the island of Montreal since 2015.

He was first elected to office in 1994 as a municipal councillor in the Town of Hampstead. When Hampstead and all the other cities on the Montreal island were forced to merge into the City of Montreal by the Parti Québécois government in 2001, he was elected as a municipal councillor in the borough of Côte Saint-Luc-Hampstead-Montreal West. Housefather then led the demerger movement in his borough. Following the successful demerger of all three municipalities as determined in a referendum on June 20, 2004, he was elected Mayor of the City of Côte Saint-Luc, and served from 2005 until 2015, when he resigned following his election to Parliament.

Housefather was first elected to Parliament in the Canadian federal election of October 2015. From 2015 to 2019, Housefather served as the Chair of the Justice and Human Rights Committee. Following the 2019 election, he was named the Parliamentary Secretary to the Minister of Labour. Following the 2021 federal election, Housefather was named Parliamentary Secretary to the Minister of Public Services and Procurement, a position he held until fall 2023. Housefather was also named to the Standing Committee on Canadian Heritage and the Standing Committee on Operations and Estimates in 2021. In 2024, he became Parliamentary Secretary to the President of the Treasury Board.

== Early life and career ==
Housefather was born in Montreal, Quebec, and is Jewish. He is the son of Myrna and David Housefather, a notary. His grandparents were all born in Montreal. He was considered intellectually gifted as a child, and attended McGill University's Summer School for Gifted and Talented Children at the age of 11.

He went to Herzliah High School, and is fluent in Hebrew. Housefather holds two law degrees (B.C.L. and LL.B.) from McGill University, and an MBA from Concordia University's John Molson School of Business. Before his election to federal office, he served as Executive Vice President, Corporate Affairs and General Counsel, at Dialogic Corporation, a multinational technology company.

Housefather was a nationally ranked athlete as a student. He returned to competitive swimming in 2010, and earned seven medals (two silver, and five bronze) in swimming masters events at the 2013 Maccabiah Games in Israel, and five at the 2017 Maccabiah Games.

Housefather became active in the Mount Royal Liberal Association as a teenager. He was elected as Policy Vice President of the Young Liberals of Canada's Quebec wing in 1991, and in 1992 was elected to the Liberal Party's national executive as Policy Vice President of the Young Liberals of Canada. In that role, he worked on the platform committee for the development of the Red Book, the Liberal Party platform in the 1993 campaign.

== Early political career ==
When his term on the national executive ended, Housefather ran for Hampstead Town Council and was elected in 1994, defeating two other candidates. He was re-elected in 1998, and served in this capacity until 2001, when the Quebec government forced all cities and towns on the Island of Montreal to merge.

=== Alliance Quebec President ===
Housefather was involved in organizations working on behalf of Quebec's English-speaking minority in the 1990s. In addition to being involved with Federation CJA's Pro Montreal at its inception, he was also involved in the creation of Youth Employment Services. Both of these groups concentrated on keeping the youth of the English-speaking community in Quebec by helping them find jobs.

He also served on the Board of Directors, and then as the Executive, of Alliance Quebec. Housefather was elected President of Alliance Quebec in 2000 and served until 2001, when he ran for office in the new mega-city of Montreal following the forced mergers.

== Municipal politics (2001-2005) ==
Housefather, together with the vast majority of Mayors and Councillors of suburban municipalities, opposed the forced mergers of municipalities on the island of Montréal to form a single City of Montreal. When the Quebec Court of Appeals ruled that the cities had no constitutional protection against the forced mergers, Housefather joined many suburban mayors and councillors who ran for election in the City of Montreal, campaigning on the promise to support demerger if a new government ever permitted it. In the 2001 election, he was elected as a Councillor for the Borough of Côte Saint-Luc–Hampstead–Montreal West, receiving approximately 70% of the vote.

When the Quebec Liberal Party was elected in 2003, it set in motion a process that permitted cities and towns to de-merge from the consolidated city of Montréal. Housefather was alone amongst the three elected Councillors in Côte Saint-Luc-Hampstead-Montreal West to support the demerger of the three communities. In 2004, he served as co-chair of the demerger committee of the Côte Saint-Luc along with former City Councillors Mitchell Brownstein, Ruth Kovac, and Glenn J. Nashen. He was also a member of the Hampstead Demerger Committee and the Montreal West Demerger Committee. On June 20, 2004, all three communities voted to demerge from Montreal, with the Yes vote representing 91% of the votes cast in Hampstead, 87% of the votes cast in Côte Saint-Luc, and 84% of the votes cast in Montreal West. Thus, all three municipalities were reconstituted within their former borders as of January 1, 2006, with elections scheduled for November 2005.

=== Mayor of Côte Saint-Luc (2005–2015) ===
On November 7, 2005, Housefather was elected mayor of the reconstituted City of Côte Saint-Luc, winning election with 75% of the vote while former Mayor Bernard Lang received 14% of the vote, and a third opponent received 10% of the vote.

Housefather was generally well regarded by the public during his time as mayor, and was re-elected by acclamation to a second term as Mayor of Côte Saint-Luc on October 2, 2009, in advance of a November 1, 2009 vote. He was acclaimed again on October 4, 2013, in advance of a November 4, 2013 vote.

As mayor, Housefather was very involved in provincial as well as local issues. He led the fight by bilingual municipalities against the Parti Quebecois' government's Bill 14, which amongst other things would have deprived many Quebec municipalities of bilingual status. He drafted and presented a brief with Town of Mount Royal Mayor Philippe Roy at the National Assembly of Quebec on Bill 14 on March 11, 2013.

He also held a rally at Côte Saint-Luc City Hall for religious tolerance, and led in the opposition to the PQ's Charter of Values which sought to bar any employee from wearing religious gear in schools, hospitals, municipalities and provincial government. Both of these bills were dropped.

During the years when Côte Saint-Luc was in Montreal, a collective agreement was signed by the mega-city giving firefighters a monopoly on first response, which put Côte Saint-Luc's much-valued Emergency Measures Service at risk of disappearing. With the help of D'Arcy-McGee MNA Lawrence Bergman, Housefather was able to convince the Quebec Government to add a provision to Bill 22 to allow Côte Saint-Luc to operate its first-responder service permanently. Housefather also was able to work with other mayors to save a local police station and to convince the Agglomeration of Montreal to adopt a resolution allocating $44 million for the Cavendish extension. He also worked with Councillor Dida Berku and environmental groups to help preserve the Meadowbrook Golf Course as a green space.

At a local level, Housefather and his council were viewed as one of the most innovative councils in Quebec. Côte Saint-Luc built an $18 million Aquatic and Community Centre on time and under budget, and developed one of Montreal's leading aquatics programs. Under the Housefather administration, Côte Saint-Luc was the first city on the island of Montreal to launch a composting program for all single-family homes, the first to launch a food policy, and launched a farmer's market and community gardens. The median age of residents of the City of Côte Saint-Luc fell by seven years over Housefather's tenure as mayor, as the community expanded high-quality programs for children and young adults and sponsored townhouses and other housing favourable to young families. But at the same time a permanent home was found for the city's seniors clubs and legion.

In addition to his duties within local government, between 2006 and 2015 Housefather also served as the Secretary of the Association of Suburban Municipalities (ASM), which represents the 15 demerged cities and towns on the Island of Montreal. Housefather was also a member of the island-wide Montreal agglomeration council and the agglomeration's Public Security Commission.

== Member of Parliament (2015–present) ==
=== Federal elections ===
2015

When Liberal Party of Canada MP Irwin Cotler announced he would not run in the 2015 federal election in the Mount Royal riding, Housefather was supported by most of the elected officials in the riding when he declared his intention to run. His Liberal nomination opponent was communications strategist Jonathan Goldbloom. Housefather said his 20 successful years in municipal politics were excellent preparation for the role of MP. Over the course of the year he signed up over 3,000 residents of the riding to support him at the nominating meeting.

The Mount Royal nomination meeting took place on November 30, 2014. With 1,948 ballots cast, Housefather was declared the winner and the official Liberal Party candidate for the 2015 federal election.

The Conservative Party targeted Mount Royal in the 2015 election, with Prime Minister Stephen Harper launching his party's campaign in Mount Royal. Housefather ran a vigorous door-to-door campaign, and managed to assemble support from a wide variety of communities within the riding as well as the majority of elected officials at the municipal and school board election. Housefather and the NDP candidate debated four times in the riding, with the Conservative candidate participating in two of the debates and refusing two. However, Housefather debated against Conservative candidate Robert Libman on CTV and Radio Shalom, and all three candidates debated on CJAD.

Following the campaign, Housefather was elected as the Member of Parliament for Mount Royal on October 19, 2015, with 50.4% of the vote, and tripling the Liberal majority from the 2011 election.

Housefather was profiled as one of 10 rookie MPs to watch in the new parliament.

2019

Housefather was re-elected with 56.3% of the vote and substantially increased his margin of victory compared to the 2015 Federal Election, from 12.4% to 31.4%, beating conservative candidate David Torjdman by 13,703 votes. Following his re-election, Housefather was named Parliamentary Secretary to the Minister of Labour.

2021

Housefather was again reelected in Mount Royal with the highest percentage of votes in the riding since 2006. Housefather increased his margin of victory from 56.3% in 2019 to 57.7% in 2021, even as the Liberal party's vote share nationally fell 0.5%, to beat runner up Conservative candidate Frank Cavallaro by 13421 votes. Following his re-election, Housefather was named Parliamentary Secretary to the Minister of Public Services and Procurement.

In 2024, he became Parliamentary Secretary to the President of the Treasury Board.

=== In Parliament ===
On February 16, 2016, he was elected as Chairman of the Standing Committee on Justice and Human Rights.

Housefather received considerable acclaim for his chairing of the Standing Committee on Justice and Human Rights, with committee members from all parties praising his handling of the difficult committee hearings on the assisted dying bill C-14. Housefather also helped lead several unanimous reports through the committee, including the Human Trafficking in Canada Report, Report to Better Support Mental Health for Jurors, and Access to the Justice System including via Legal Aid and the Court Challenges Program. He also led the fight in passing Bill S-201, An Act to prohibit and prevent genetic discrimination.

As of May 20, 2016, no rookie Liberal MP had spoken more in the House of Commons than Housefather.

Housefather was the Chair of The Standing Committee on Justice and Human Rights which, on March 13, 2019, voted to adjourn rather than debate whether Jody Wilson-Raybould should reappear before the committee to provide additional testimony on the SNC-Lavalin affair and, on March 19, 2019 (the day of the 2019 Federal Budget), ended the study into the affair without calling further witnesses.

In February 2019, Housefather apologized after suggesting during multiple media interviews that Jody Wilson-Raybould was likely shuffled for her inability to speak French.

On December 12, 2019, with MP Rodger Cuzner no longer a sitting Member of the House of Commons, Housefather took on the role of reciting a poem and parody of the Night Before Christmas that took good-humoured jabs at political rivals just before the House of Commons rose for their annual holiday break. It was received with a standing ovation and roars of laughter from Members of all parties.

In 2021, Housefather assumed the chairmanship of the Canada-Israel Interparliamentary Group and in 2022 the role of vice-chair of the Canada-United States Inter-Parliamentary Group. Mr. Housefather has been active on the issue of bilingualism and the protection of minority language rights. Since the introduction of Quebec's Bill 96, he has frequently stood in the House to voice his opposition to the Bill.

In July 2024, Prime Minister Justin Trudeau appointed MP Anthony Housefather as his adviser on Canadian Jewish community and antisemitism.

Housefather has stated that he is a centrist.

Housefather, as the lone dissident in the Liberal Party, voted against Bill C-13, introduced by his own party, which was aimed at "moderniz[ing] the Official Languages Act," according to the National Post. Citing concerns about English-speakers in Quebec, Housefather was the sole MP to vote 'No' to the bill, in a 301-to-1 vote.

==== In the riding ====
In February 2016, Housefather relayed the support of the constituents in his riding for the Cavendish Boulevard extension between Côte St. Luc and St. Laurent in the House of Commons. In May 2016, Quebec Liberals adopted a resolution calling for the Cavendish extension to be realized.

In April 2016, Housefather and Minister of Families, Children and Social Development Jean-Yves Duclos announced the federal government would provide $390,913 over a period of three years for a new drop-in centre, which provides relief for caregivers of seniors, at the Côte St. Luc Aquatic and Community Centre as part of the New Horizons for Seniors Program. In total $1.1 million was received for senior programs assisting caregivers in the riding.

In May, Housefather announced that over 270 summer jobs had been created for students in the riding, with more than double the number of jobs created than in 2015.

In the election campaign, Housefather had promised to hold quarterly town hall meetings in the riding to give constituents a report on what is happening in Ottawa and in the riding and to take questions as he did as Mayor. The first town hall meeting was held in Hampstead in January and the second was held in the Town of Mount Royal in April. The meetings are called Anthony's Assemblies.

==== In the media ====
Housefather has written several opinion pieces for Canadian newspapers, and has been interviewed on local and national news networks, sharing his views on subjects including his experience as a member of parliament, minority language issues, and his support of more permissive surrogacy laws in Canada.

In November 2020, Housefather published an op-ed in CNN alongside his co-members of the Interparliamentary Taskforce on Combatting Online Antisemitism. Their article expressed the need for global collaboration to hold social media companies accountable for what takes place on their platforms and to create internationally cohesive and transparent policies to tackle hate speech.

In 2021, Housefather published an op-ed in the National Post discussing the need for a new independent institution in Canada to combat online disinformation.

Following the introduction of Bill 96 in Québec, Housefather has been featured prominently in local and national media for his opposition to the Bill. In May 2022, Housefather published an op-ed in the Montreal Gazette expressing his concern with the bill.[i] That same month, the Canadian Broadcasting Corporation reported that Housefather and other Liberal members of parliament participated in a protest against Bill 96. He later joined Rosemary Barton on Rosemary Barton Live to discuss his concerns with the legislation.

In July 2024, Housefather, who is Jewish, was labelled a neo-Nazi in flyers with a swastika photoshopped into where the Star of David should be on an Israeli flag. The flyers, which were posted in Montreal, also stated that he should "get out of town." Canada's Special Envoy for Preserving Holocaust Remembrance and Combating Antisemitism Deborah Lyons wrote on social media that "the sign was not only targeting Housefather but all Jewish Canadians, most of whom identified as Zionists." Lyons has stated that antisemitism in Canada is at a high, could potentially get worse, and needs to be addressed on many levels.

== Israel advocacy ==
In February 2016, Housefather earned international media attention for a speech he delivered in support of an anti-Boycott, Divestment, and Sanctions (BDS) motion put forward in the House of Commons. The motion urged the government to reject the goals of the BDS movement, while calling on the government to "condemn any and all attempts by Canadian organizations, groups or individuals to promote [it] both here at home and abroad." Prime Minister Justin Trudeau and most other Liberals voted in favour of the motion, which passed 229–51.

On March 24, 2016, Housefather echoed Foreign Minister Stéphane Dion's criticism of the UN Human Rights Council's decision to appoint University of Western Ontario law professor Michael Lynk as its Special Rapporteur on human rights in Palestine. This followed criticism from Jewish groups including the Centre for Israel and Jewish Affairs, which accused Lynk of bias against Israel.

In May 2018, Housefather distanced himself from his own government and strongly disagreed with Justin Trudeau, when he made a statement that condemned the Israeli military for using excessive force against unarmed civilians and called for an independent investigation into Israel, after an Israeli sniper shot a Canadian physician, Dr. Tarek Loubani in Gaza. Housefather strongly denounced any claims of not being a forceful advocate for Israel and stated that he always has been and "will continue to be a huge supporter of Israel." Housefather characterizes himself as one of the most prominent Israeli advocates in Parliament, and reiterated his loyalty to his constituents as well as Canada's Jewish community. Housefather is a member of the Canada-Israel Interparliamentary group. Following the start of the Israeli war on Gaza in October 2023, Housefather travelled to Israel and took photos with former Israeli Prime Minister Naftali Bennett. On January 19, 2024, Housefather appeared on CBC's Power and Politics and stated that Canada should categorically reject South Africa's genocide claim against Israel while saying that Israel was merely "defending itself".

Housefather made the headlines once more in April 2024 when he drew attention to his future within the Liberal Party after his party supported an NDP-backed motion about a potential Palestinian statehood. While he had been "angered" by the "adoption of the motion and all the events that preceded it," Housefather said he also knew his "core values remain[ed] Liberal ones" and "believe[d] [his] greatest value to Canadians is staying in caucus to advocate for a centrist classical Liberal Party" he believes in.

In July 2025, Housefather said that the Irish band Kneecap should be banned from entering Canada.

== Athletics ==
Housefather was a competitive swimmer in his teens, and then a competitive water polo player. He started competitive swimming again in 2010. In July and August 2013, Housefather won seven medals, five silver medals and two bronze medals, in the Masters category in swimming at the 2013 Maccabiah Games in Israel. He won five medals, three silver medals and two bronze medals, in a number of Masters (35+) swimming events at the 2017 Maccabiah Games.

Housefather swims on the Parliamentary Swim Team and runs with the running group on the Hill, which, as part of a wider fitness initiative, aims to keep members of Parliament physically active while promoting health and physical fitness. He advocates for athletics and physical fitness as a Member of Parliament, serving as the Liberal Party lead on the Parliamentary fitness initiative started by former MP John Weston.

== Electoral record ==
=== Federal ===
2025 Canadian federal election: Mount Royal
Party	Candidate	Votes	%	±%	Expenditures
Liberal	Anthony Housefather	25,544	51.06	−6.35	$86,551.70
Conservative	Neil Oberman	20,244	40.47	+16.40	$123,088.34
New Democratic	Adam Frank	2,353	4.70	−4.13	$5,334.51
Bloc Québécois	Yegor Komarov	1,671	3.34	−0.73	$3,221.59
Marxist–Leninist	Diane Johnston	216	0.43	+0.20	$0.00
Total valid votes/expense limit		49,028	98.74	–	$125,466.16
Total rejected ballots		871	1.26		
Turnout		49,899	64.84		
Eligible voters		76,951			
Liberal hold		Swing		+11.38	
Source: Elections Canada
Note: number of eligible voters does not include voting day registrations.

2021 Canadian federal election: Mount Royal
Party	Candidate	Votes	%	±%	Expenditures
Liberal	Anthony Housefather	23,292	57.71	+1.42	$93,203.95
Conservative	Frank Cavallaro	9,871	24.46	-0.47	$16,697.71
New Democratic	Ibrahim Bruno El-Khoury	3,378	8.37	+0.11	$575.63
Bloc Québécois	Yegor Komarov	1,582	3.92	-0.10	$2,242.01
Green	Clement Badra	1,085	2.78	-2.69	$638.61
People's	Zachary Lozoff	1,053	2.61	+1.78	$0.00
Marxist–Leninist	Diane Johnston	96	0.24	+0.04	$0.00
Total valid votes/expense limit		40,357	–	–	$107,092.98
Total rejected ballots					
Turnout		56.72	-3.69		
Eligible voters		71,153			
Liberal hold		Swing		+0.94	
Source: Elections Canada

2019 Canadian federal election: Mount Royal
Party	Candidate	Votes	%	±%	Expenditures
Liberal	Anthony Housefather	24,590	56.30	+5.95	$75,605.49
Conservative	David Tordjman	10,887	24.93	-12.96	$80,742.48
New Democratic	Eric-Abel Baland	3,609	8.26	+0.18	none listed
Green	Clément Badra	2,389	5.47	+3.92	$4,397.05
Bloc Québécois	Xavier Levesque	1,757	4.02	+2.12	none listed
People's	Zachary Lozoff	362	0.83	–	$0.00
Marxist–Leninist	Diane Johnston	85	0.19	-0.07	$0.00
Total valid votes/expense limit		43,679	98.68		
Total rejected ballots		583	1.32		
Turnout		44,262	60.41		
Eligible voters		73,273			
Liberal hold		Swing		+9.46	
Source: Elections Canada

2015 Canadian federal election
Party	Candidate	Votes	%	±%	Expenditures
Liberal	Anthony Housefather	24,187	50.34	+8.93	–
Conservative	Robert Libman	18,201	37.88	+2.27	–
New Democratic	Mario Jacinto Rimbao	3,884	8.08	-9.77	–
Bloc Québécois	Jade Bossé Bélanger	908	1.90	-1.01	–
Green	Timothy Landry	747	1.55	-0.20	–
Marxist–Leninist	Diane Johnston	124	0.26	-0.02	–
Total valid votes/Expense limit		48,051	100.00	–	$207,183.11
Total rejected ballots		425	0.88	–	–
Turnout		48,476	65.18	+7.54	–
Eligible voters		74,374	–	–	–
Source: Elections Canada
Liberal hold		Swing		+6.66	

=== Municipal ===
2013 Côte Saint-Luc mayoral election
Mayoral candidate	Vote	%
Anthony Housefather (X)	Acclaimed	

2009 Côte Saint-Luc mayoral election
Mayoral candidate	Vote	%
Anthony Housefather (X)	Acclaimed	

2005 Côte Saint-Luc mayoral election
Mayoral candidate	Vote	%
Anthony Housefather	6,366	73.55
Bernard Lang	1,397	16.14
David Fuchs	892	10.28
