= Strulovitch =

Strulovitch is a surname. Notable people with the surname include:

- Lance Strulovitch (born 1998), Canadian racecar driver better known as Lance Stroll
- Lawrence Sheldon Strulovitch (born 1959), Canadian billionaire businessman better known as Lawrence Stroll
- Sidney "Cy" Strulovitch (1925–2020), Canadian basketball player and Olympian
