= Robert Libman =

Canadian politician and architect

Leader of the Equality Party
- In office 1989–1994
- Preceded by: new party
- Succeeded by: Keith Henderson

Borough Mayor of Côte-Saint-Luc–Hampstead–Montreal West
- In office 2001–2005
- Preceded by: position established
- Succeeded by: position abolished

Mayor of Côte Saint-Luc
- In office 1998–2001
- Preceded by: Bernard Lang
- Succeeded by: Anthony Housefather

Member of the National Assembly of Quebec for D'Arcy-McGee
- In office 1989–1994
- Preceded by: Herbert Marx
- Succeeded by: Lawrence Bergman

Personal details
- Born: November 8, 1960 (age 65) Montreal, Quebec
- Party: Equality Party; Conservative Party
- Spouses: Malia Azeroual (div. 1994); Joanne Shapiro (m. 1997)
- Children: Kevin, Daniel and Jonathan

Robert Libman (born November 8, 1960) is a Canadian politician and architect.

== Background ==
Born in Montreal, Quebec, he is the son of David Libman and Goldie Aronovitch and is the oldest of four brothers. He attended Herzliah High School, Vanier College, and received a Bachelor of Architecture from McGill University in 1985. From 1985 to 1989, he practiced architecture with Jacques Beique et Associés and Tolchinsky and Goodz Architects. He rose to political prominence in the late 1980s and into the 1990s as a defender and spokesperson for the rights of Quebec's English speaking community.

== Provincial politics ==
In 1988, he co-founded the Equality Party to protest against the Quebec Liberal Party government's decision to extend a ban on English commercial signs. In 1989, the party won four seats in the provincial election, including Libman's who was elected as a Member of the National Assembly in the Montreal riding of D'Arcy-McGee, winning 57.85% of the valid ballots.

Due in part to the surprise victory of the Equality Party, the Quebec government later lessened restrictions on English signs. During his term in office, Libman made headlines by using his parliamentary privilege to reveal the details of confidential, money-losing contracts signed between Hydro-Québec and some of Quebec's aluminum producers.

Libman left the Equality Party and sat as an independent shortly before the 1994 general election. His supporters attempted to make him the Quebec Liberal Party candidate in his riding. However, new Quebec Liberal Party leader Daniel Johnson refused to sign his nomination papers. Libman ran as an independent and lost to the Quebec Liberal Party candidate Lawrence Bergman.

After his election defeat, he hosted an evening talk show on Montreal radio station CJAD for three years. He also became the Quebec Regional Director of B'nai Brith Canada.

In 1997 Libman won a unanimous Supreme Court of Canada judgement in Libman v Quebec (AG). Certain sections of the Quebec Referendum Law, concerning restrictions on third party spending, were struck down. As a result of this decision, the charges against federalist groups who participated in the large Pro-Canada Rally during the 1995 referendum campaign were cancelled.

In 1995 Libman authored Riding the Rapids; The Whitewater Rise and Fall of Quebec's Anglo Protest published by Robert Davies Publishing.

== Mayor of Côte Saint-Luc ==
In 1998, Libman was acclaimed mayor of the city of Côte Saint-Luc, Quebec. In 2001, he was elected borough mayor of Côte Saint-Luc—Hampstead—Montreal West and was a member of the Montreal City Council and its Executive Committee, after the forced mergers of the island of Montreal municipalities into the City of Montreal. He was responsible for the Urban Planning and Development portfolio and was charged with overseeing the creation of Montreal's new Urban Master Plan which was adopted by City Council in 2004.

As mayor he worked to resolve the long-standing impasse regarding the Cavendish extension, which had been opposed by his predecessor, Bernard Lang. In 2000 he met with a former National Assembly colleague, Guy Chevrette who was now the Minister of Transport proposing a route that connected the northern and southern portions of Cavendish but jogged slightly to the east to connect with Ferrier Street and Royalmount Avenue thus diminishing the impact of a direct highway running through Côte Saint-Luc. As part of the Montreal Executive Committee the City announced the creation of a project bureau to study the proposal, but with the subsequent demerger of the City, the project fell by the wayside.

Libman supported the continued merger of the borough of Côte Saint-Luc with the megacity of Montreal after the provincial government watered down their promise of allowing the former cities to return to the same status as they had before the merger.

He decided to quit politics in 2005, and not to run for mayor of the re-constituted city of Côte Saint-Luc following its demerger from the megacity of Montreal. He returned to private life and opened his own architectural consulting firm, Libcorp Consultants Inc. He was also a director and partner in RSW Properties, a property management firm in Montreal until 2015. Later that year he joined Olymbec, a large real estate developer as their in-house consultant on architecture, planning and municipal zoning.

== Move to federal politics ==
Libman returned to politics in 2014 by seeking the Conservative Party of Canada nomination in Mount Royal for the 2015 federal election. Libman won the nomination on April 26, beating former TVA journalist, Pascale Déry. On October 19, 2015, Libman was defeated by Liberal Anthony Housefather.

In January 2021 Libman was named by the Montreal Gazette as a weekly political affairs columnist for the Saturday edition.

== Electoral history ==
=== Federal ===
2015 Canadian federal election
Party	Candidate	Votes	%	±%	Expenditures
Liberal	Anthony Housefather	24,187	50.34	+8.93	–
Conservative	Robert Libman	18,201	37.88	+2.27	–
New Democratic	Mario Jacinto Rimbao	3,884	8.08	-9.77	–
Bloc Québécois	Jade Bossé Bélanger	908	1.90	-1.01	–
Green	Timothy Landry	747	1.55	-0.20	–
Marxist–Leninist	Diane Johnston	124	0.26	-0.02	–
Total valid votes/Expense limit		48,051	100.00	–	$207,183.11
Total rejected ballots		425	0.88	–	–
Turnout		48,476	65.18	+7.54	–
Eligible voters		74,374	–	–	–
Liberal hold		Swing		+6.66	
Source: Elections Canada

=== Provincial ===
1994 Quebec general election
Party	Candidate	Votes	%	±%
Liberal	Lawrence Bergman	21,325	65.37	+29.82
Independent	Robert Libman	10,056	30.83	-27.02
Parti Québécois	François Normandin	1,084	3.32	+0.27
Natural law	Ena Kahn	157	0.48	–
Total valid votes		32,622	99.38	–
Rejected and declined votes		204	0.62	–
Turnout		32,826	84.46	+8.07
Electors on the lists		38,868	–	–
Liberal gain from Equality		Swing		+28.42
Source: Official Results, Le Directeur général des élections du Québec.

1989 Quebec general election
Party	Candidate	Votes	%	±%
Equality	Robert Libman	15,746	57.85	–
Liberal	Gary Waxman	9,677	35.55	-55.90
Parti Québécois	Jacques Carraire	829	3.05	-1.47
Green	Harriett Fels	532	1.95	–
Independent	Carol Zimmerman	262	0.96	–
New Democratic	David Alexander Schulze	173	0.64	-3.12
Total valid votes		27,219	99.17	–
Rejected and declined votes		221	0.81	–
Turnout		27,440	76.39	+7.81
Electors on the lists		35,921	–	–
Equality gain from Liberal		Swing		+56.88
Source: Official Results, Le Directeur général des élections du Québec.

== See also ==
- List of third party leaders (Quebec)
- History of Quebec
