= Westmount (provincial electoral district) =

Coordinates: 45°29′N 73°36′W

Quebec electoral district

Defunct provincial electoral district
- Legislature: National Assembly of Quebec
- District created: 1912
- District abolished: 1939
- District re-created: 1965
- District re-abolished: 1988
- First contested: 1912
- Last contested: 1989

Demographics
- Census division(s): Montreal (part)
- Census subdivision(s): Westmount

Westmount was a former provincial electoral district located in the Montreal region of Quebec, Canada.

It corresponded to the city of Westmount in Montreal.

It was created for the 1912 election from Montréal–Saint-Georges. It disappeared in the 1939 election and its successor election was Westmount–Saint-Georges. However, Westmount–Saint-Georges disappeared in the 1966 election and its successor electoral district was the re-created Westmount. Westmount's final election was in 1989. It disappeared for good in the 1994 election.

== Members of the Legislative Assembly / National Assembly ==
Legislature	Years	Member	Party
Riding created from Montréal–Saint-Georges
13th	1912–1916	Charles Allan Smart	Conservative
14th	1916–1919	Charles Allan Smart	Conservative
15th	1919–1923	Charles Allan Smart	Conservative
16th	1923–1927	Charles Allan Smart	Conservative
17th	1927–1931	Charles Allan Smart	Conservative
18th	1931–1935	Charles Allan Smart	Conservative
19th	1935–1936	Charles Allan Smart	Conservative
20th	1936–1939	William Ross Bulloch	Union Nationale
Dissolved into Westmount–Saint-Georges
Recreated from Westmount–Saint-Georges
29th	1970–1973	Thomas Kevin Drummond	Liberal
30th	1973–1976	Thomas Kevin Drummond	Liberal
31st	1976–1981	George Springate	Liberal
32nd	1981–1985	Richard French	Liberal
33rd	1985–1989	Richard French	Liberal
34th	1989–1991	Richard Holden	Equality
34th	1991–1992	Richard Holden	Independent
34th	1992–1994	Richard Holden	Parti Québécois
Dissolved into Westmount–Saint-Louis
