= Richard French =

Richard French may refer to:

- Richard French (American politician) (1792–1854), U.S. Representative from Kentucky
- Richard French (Canadian politician) (born 1947), Canadian businessman, academic and politician
- Richard French (newscaster), host of Richard French Live! program on RNN
- Richard G. French (born 1949), American planetary astronomer
- Richard West French, also known as "Bo" French, American politician from Texas
