= Herbert Marx =

Herbert Marx may refer to:

- Herbert Manfred Marx, known as Zeppo Marx, member of The Marx Brothers
- Herbert Marx (politician) (1932–2020), Canadian politician and judge
