= Contributing editor =

Profession in the media business

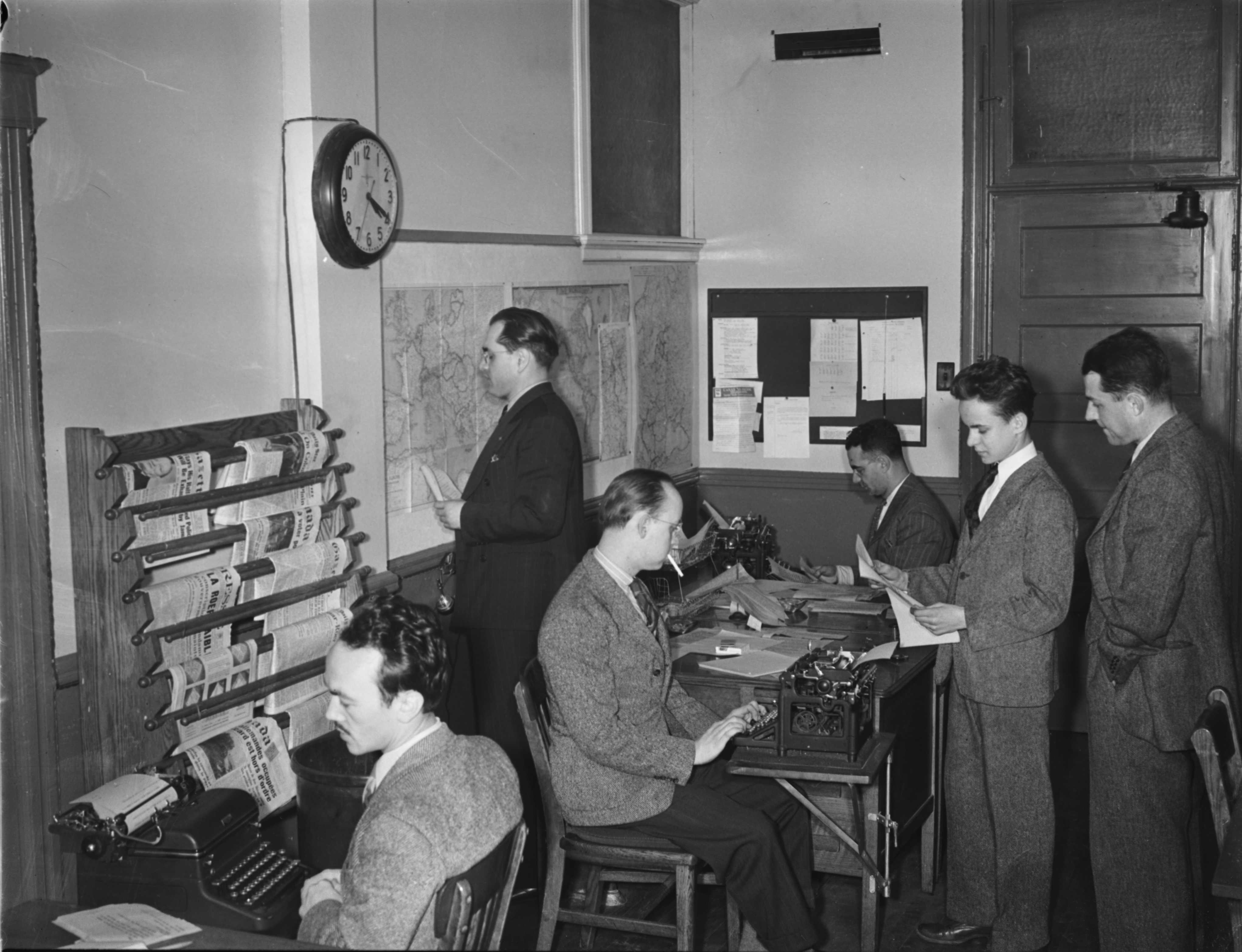
Journalists and contributing editors writing in the newsroom of the Canadian Broadcasting Corporation, photographed by Conrad Poirier (Montréal, 1944)

A contributing editor is a newspaper, magazine or online job title that varies in its responsibilities. Often, but not always, a contributing editor is a "high-end" freelancer, consultant, or expert who has proven ability and has readership draw. This contributing editor regularly contributes articles to the publication but does not always edit articles. Here the title "editor" implies a certain level of prestige rather than a more traditional editing role. In other instances, however, a contributing editor may oversee projects or specific aspects of a publication and have more regular editing duties. At smaller magazines, the title can imply a staff member with regular writing responsibility and some editorial duties. Magazines, websites, books, sources, and journals use contributing editors.

When a "contributing editor" is listed on the title page of a book, the term generally designates a person who has served as some kind of consultant in the book's preparation but who is not responsible for the book's final content.

In 2011, a contributing editor's salary often ranged from $40,000 to $60,000 per year. Salaries vary depending on the company overseeing the project and the size of the project.

A contributing editor's responsibilities may include developing content for articles, meeting deadlines, reviewing articles, editing grammar and content to ensure quality readership, attending conferences to develop editing skills, and exchanging ideas with others.
