= D'Arcy-McGee =

Provincial electoral district in Quebec, Canada

Coordinates: 45.4698°N 73.6625°W

Quebec electoral district
- Location in Montreal

Provincial electoral district
- Legislature: National Assembly of Quebec
MNA
Elisabeth Prass
Liberal
- District created: 1965
- First contested: 1966
- Last contested: 2026

Demographics
- Population (2011): 61,490
- Electors (2014): 40,892
- Area (km²): 10.8
- Pop. density (per km²): 5,693.5
- Census division: Montreal (part)
- Census subdivision(s): Montreal (part), Côte Saint-Luc, Hampstead

D'Arcy-McGee is a provincial electoral district in the Montreal region of the province of Quebec, Canada, that elects members to the National Assembly of Quebec. It consists of the cities of Côte-Saint-Luc and Hampstead and part of the Côte-des-Neiges–Notre-Dame-de-Grâce borough of the city of Montreal. It is the only provincial electoral district in Quebec with a Jewish plurality. It is considered to be one of the safest districts in Quebec for the Liberals; in the 2014 provincial election the Liberals garnered 92% of the vote, making it the most secure seat in the province.

It was created for the 1966 election from parts of the former Montréal-Outremont and Westmount–Saint-Georges electoral districts.

The boundaries of the D'Arcy-McGee electoral district on the 2011 electoral map are identical to the previous boundaries. Following the 2017 redistribution, the riding will lose its territory in Notre-Dame-de-Grâce to the riding of Notre-Dame-de-Grâce and will gain a large part of the Côte-des-Neiges neighbourhood from Mont-Royal and Outremont.

The riding was named after Thomas D'Arcy McGee, a Father of Confederation.

== Members of the Legislative Assembly / National Assembly ==
This riding has elected the following members of the National Assembly:

Legislature	Years	Member	Party
Riding created from Montréal-Outremont and Westmount–Saint-Georges
28th	1966–1970	Victor Goldbloom	Liberal
29th	1970–1973	Victor Goldbloom	Liberal
30th	1973–1976	Victor Goldbloom	Liberal
31st	1976–1979	Victor Goldbloom	Liberal
31st	1979–1981	Herbert Marx	Liberal
32nd	1981–1985	Herbert Marx	Liberal
33rd	1985–1989	Herbert Marx	Liberal
34th	1989–1993	Robert Libman	Equality
34th	1993–1994	Robert Libman	Independent
35th	1994–1998	Lawrence Bergman	Liberal
36th	1998–2003	Lawrence Bergman	Liberal
37th	2003–2007	Lawrence Bergman	Liberal
38th	2007–2008	Lawrence Bergman	Liberal
39th	2008–2012	Lawrence Bergman	Liberal
40th	2012–2014	Lawrence Bergman	Liberal
41st	2014–2018	David Birnbaum	Liberal
42nd	2018–2022	David Birnbaum	Liberal
43rd	2022–2026	Elisabeth Prass	Liberal
44th	2026–Present	Elisabeth Prass	Liberal

== Geography ==
D'Arcy-McGee is located on the island of Montreal.

It consists of the municipalities of:

- Côte Saint-Luc
- Hampstead
- Montreal (part)

== Linguistic demographics ==
- Anglophone: 42.4%
- Allophone: 38.2%
- Francophone: 19.3%

== Election results ==
2026 Quebec general election
** Preliminary results — Not yet official **
Party	Candidate	Votes	%	±%
Liberal	Elisabeth Prass	16,442	60.74	+9.33
Conservative	Adrien Pouliot	5,336	19.71	–2.24
Québec solidaire	Lucian Costin	2,703	9.98	+1.46
Parti Québécois	Maïté Larouche	1,056	3.90	+1.39
Coalition Avenir Québec	Junlian Leblanc	694	2.56	–3.35
Canadian	Joyce Stoliar Shanks	439	1.62	–3.35
Green	Gavin Zheng	246	0.91	–1.20
Marxist–Leninist	Diane Johnston	83	0.31	+0.05
Parti nul	Guillaume Massie-Hamel	72	0.27	N/A
Total valid votes		27,071	98.88	–0.08
Total rejected ballots		306	1.12	+0.08
Turnout		27,377	48.10	+0.61
Electors on the lists		56,919		
Liberal hold		Swing		+5.79
Source: Élections Québec

2022 Quebec general election
Party	Candidate	Votes	%	±%
Liberal	Elisabeth Prass	13,298	51.41	-22.91
Conservative	Bonnie Feigenbaum	5,677	21.95	+17.46
Québec solidaire	Hilal Pilavci	2,203	8.52	+1.27
Coalition Avenir Québec	Junlian Leblanc	1,529	5.91	-0.49
Canadian	Marc Perez	1,285	4.97	–
Parti Québécois	Renée-Claude Lafontaine	648	2.51	-0.05
Bloc Montreal	Joel Debellefeuille	613	2.37	–
Green	Moussa Seck	547	2.11	-1.15
Marxist–Leninist	Diane Johnston	66	0.26	-0.04
Total valid votes		25,866	98.96	
Total rejected ballots		273	1.04	
Turnout		26,139	47.49	
Electors on the lists		55,044		

2018 Quebec general election
Party	Candidate	Votes	%	±%
Liberal	David Birnbaum	19,085	74.32	-17.83
Québec solidaire	Jean-Claude Kumuyange	1,861	7.25	+5.19
Coalition Avenir Québec	Mélodie Cohn	1,643	6.40	+3.95
Conservative	Yaniv Loran	1,153	4.49	
Green	Jérémie Alarco	837	3.26	+1.71
Parti Québécois	Eliane Pion	657	2.56	+0.77
New Democratic	Leigh Smit	368	1.43	
Marxist–Leninist	Diane Johnston	77	0.30	
Total valid votes		25,681	98.98	
Total rejected ballots		265	1.02	
Turnout		25,946	46.56	
Eligible voters		55,726		
Liberal hold		Swing		-11.51
Source(s) "Rapport des résultats officiels du scrutin". Élections Québec.

2014 Quebec general election
Party	Candidate	Votes	%	±%
Liberal	David Birnbaum	26,983	92.15	+7.43
Coalition Avenir Québec	Elizabeth Smart	716	2.45	-4.92
Québec solidaire	Suzanne Dufresne	604	2.06	-1.69
Parti Québécois	Eliane Pion	524	1.79	-1.13
Green	Abraham Weizfeld	454	1.55	+0.30
Total valid votes		29,281	99.38	–
Total rejected ballots		184	0.62	-0.16
Turnout		29,465	72.06	+6.24
Electors on the lists		40,892	–	–
Liberal hold		Swing		+6.18

2012 Quebec general election
Party	Candidate	Votes	%	±%
Liberal	Lawrence Bergman	22,285	84.72	-4.03
Coalition Avenir Québec	Sophie Leroux	1,938	7.37	+5.53*
Québec solidaire	Émilie Beauchesne	987	3.75	+2.09
Parti Québécois	Guy Amyot	767	2.92	-0.63
Independent	Abraham Weizfeld	328	1.25	-0.41
Total valid votes		26,305	99.22	–
Total rejected ballots		207	0.78	–
Turnout		26,512	65.82	+26.93
Electors on the lists		40,280	–	–

* Result compared to Action démocratique

2008 Quebec general election
Party	Candidate	Votes	%	±%
Liberal	Lawrence Bergman	14,087	88.75	+4.54
Green	Jean-Christophe Mortreux	666	4.20	-2.52
Parti Québécois	Marie-Aude Ardizzon	564	3.55	+0.30
Action démocratique	Mathieu Lacombe	292	1.84	-2.43
Québec solidaire	Abraham Weizfeld	264	1.66	+0.11
Total valid votes		15,873	99.22	–
Total rejected ballots		125	0.78	–
Turnout		15,998	38.89	-14.21
Electors on the lists		41,132	–	–

2007 Quebec general election
Party	Candidate	Votes	%	±%
Liberal	Lawrence Bergman	18,410	84.21	-7.08
Green	Robert Leibner	1,470	6.72	–
Action démocratique	Marcelle Guay	934	4.27	+2.29
Parti Québécois	Pierre-Philippe Émond	710	3.25	-0.89
Québec solidaire	Abraham Weizfeld	338	1.55	–
Total valid votes		21,862	99.34	–
Total rejected ballots		145	0.66	–
Turnout		22,007	53.10	-8.54
Electors on the lists		41,445	–	–

2003 Quebec general election
Party	Candidate	Votes	%	±%
Liberal	Lawrence Bergman	23,968	91.29	+0.68
Parti Québécois	Mathieu Breault	1,087	4.14	+1.02
Action démocratique	Sylvain James Bowes	520	1.98	+0.73
Equality	William F. Shaw	406	1.55	-2.81
Bloc Pot	Blair T. Longley	274	1.04	–

1998 Quebec general election
Party	Candidate	Votes	%	±%
Liberal	Lawrence Bergman	29,065	90.61	+25.24
Equality	Bernard King	1,397	4.36	–
Parti Québécois	Jean-Claude Gaudette	1,002	3.12	-0.20
Action démocratique	Norman Brisson	400	1.25	–
Socialist Democracy	Abraham Weizfeld	135	0.42	–
Natural law	Ena Kahn	77	0.24	-0.24

1995 Quebec referendum
Side	Votes	%
Non	37,253	96.38
Oui	1,401	3.62

1994 Quebec general election
Party	Candidate	Votes	%	±%
Liberal	Lawrence Bergman	21,325	65.37	+29.82
Independent	Robert Libman	10,056	30.83	-27.02
Parti Québécois	François Normandin	1,084	3.32	+0.27
Natural law	Ena Kahn	157	0.48	–
Total valid votes		32,622	99.38	–
Rejected and declined votes		204	0.62	–
Turnout		32,826	84.46	+8.07
Electors on the lists		38,868	–	–
Liberal gain from Equality		Swing		+28.42
Source: Official Results, Le Directeur général des élections du Québec.

1992 Charlottetown Accord referendum
Side	Votes	%
Oui	28,552	92.21
Non	2,412	7.79

1989 Quebec general election
Party	Candidate	Votes	%	±%
Equality	Robert Libman	15,746	57.85	–
Liberal	Gary Waxman	9,677	35.55	-55.90
Parti Québécois	Jacques Carraire	829	3.05	-1.47
Green	Harriett Fels	532	1.95	–
Independent	Carol Zimmerman	262	0.96	–
New Democratic	David Alexander Schulze	173	0.64	-3.12
Total valid votes		27,219	99.17	–
Rejected and declined votes		221	0.81	–
Turnout		27,440	76.39	+7.81
Electors on the lists		35,921	–	–
Equality gain from Liberal		Swing		+56.88
Source: Official Results, Le Directeur général des élections du Québec.

1985 Quebec general election
Party	Candidate	Votes	%	±%
Liberal	Herbert Marx	22,799	91.45	-0.51
Parti Québécois	Richard C. Bougie	1,127	4.52	-0.89
New Democrat	Heather Yampolsky	937	3.76	–
Christian Socialist	Jocelyn Rivest	67	0.27	–

1981 Quebec general election
Party	Candidate	Votes	%	±%
Liberal	Herbert Marx	26,064	91.96	-4.52
Parti Québécois	André Daoust	1,532	5.41	+1.89
Libertarian	Victor Levis	635	2.24	–
Union Nationale	John Holmes	111	0.39	–

1980 Quebec referendum
Side	Votes	%
Non	36,365	95.88
Oui	1,563	4.12

Quebec provincial by-election, November 26, 1979
Party	Candidate	Votes	%	±%
Liberal	Herbert Marx	22,293	96.48	+28.45
Parti Québécois	David Levine	813	3.52	-1.21

1976 Quebec general election
Party	Candidate	Votes	%	±%
Liberal	Victor Charles Goldbloom	21,248	68.03	-25.74
Union Nationale	Barry Fridhandler	7,058	22.60	+22.07
Parti Québécois	Jacques Mackay	1,476	4.73	+0.48
Democratic Alliance	Elie Chalouh	950	3.04	–
Independent	Max Wollach	417	1.33	–
Ralliement créditiste	Gaëtan Gauthier	83	0.27	-1.18

1973 Quebec general election
Party	Candidate	Votes	%	±%
Liberal	Victor Charles Goldbloom	26,958	93.77	+3.36
Parti Québécois	Jacqueline Dugas	1,221	4.25	-3.74
Ralliement créditiste	John Holmes	418	1.45	N/A
Union Nationale	Florian Prévost	152	0,53	-1.07

1970 Quebec general election
Party	Candidate	Votes	%	±%
Liberal	Victor Charles Goldbloom	36,543	90.41	-0.17
Parti Québécois	Paul Unterberg	3,230	7.99	N/A
Union Nationale	Léonard Rosen	647	1.60	-4.07

1966 Quebec general election
Party	Candidate	Votes	%
Liberal	Victor Goldbloom	24,709	90.57
Union Nationale	Boris Garmaise	1,548	5.67
RIN	Louise Belzile	895	3.28
Ralliement national	Gilles Côté	129	0.47
Total valid votes		27,281	100.00
Rejected and declined ballots		699	
Turnout		27,980	60.88
Electors on the lists		45,962	
Source: Official Results, Le Directeur général des élections du Québec.

== See also ==
- List of Quebec provincial electoral districts
- Canadian provincial electoral districts
