= Michael Goldbloom =

Canadian lawyer, publisher and academic administrator (born 1953)

Michael Goldbloom CM

Chair of the Canadian Broadcasting Corporation
- Incumbent
- Assumed office April 3, 2018
- Preceded by: Rémi Racine

18th Principal and Vice-Chancellor of Bishop's University
- In office August 1, 2008 – June 30, 2023
- Preceded by: Jonathan Rittenhouse (interim)
- Succeeded by: Sébastien Lebel-Grenier

Personal details
- Born: 1953 (age 72–73) Montreal, Quebec, Canada
- Parent: Victor Goldbloom (father)
- Education: Harvard University (BA); McGill University (BCL, LLB)

Michael Goldbloom CM (born 1953) is a Canadian lawyer, publisher, and academic administrator. He is the former publisher of the Toronto Star, Canada's largest newspaper by circulation.

== Early life and education ==
Born into a Jewish family in Montreal, Quebec, as the son of Victor Goldbloom, he attended Selwyn House School and Williston Academy before receiving a Bachelor of Arts degree in 1974 from Harvard University. He received a Bachelor of Civil Law degree in 1978 and a Bachelor of Law degree in 1979 from McGill University. He was called to the Quebec Bar in 1981.

== Career ==
Goldbloom was an editorial writer for The Montreal Gazette in 1980. From 1981 to 1991, he was a labour lawyer at the Martineau Walker law firm (now known as Fasken). From 1985 to 1987, he was the president of Alliance Quebec. From 1991 to 1994, he was the president and CEO of the YMCA de Montréal. In 1994, he was appointed president and publisher of The Montreal Gazette.

In 2003, he was appointed deputy publisher and senior vice-president of strategy and human resources at the Toronto Star. In 2004, he was named publisher. He was replaced in 2006 and later was appointed head of McGill University's government relations and inter-institutional affairs office, effective January 3, 2007.

Goldbloom served as the 18th Principal and Vice-Chancellor of Bishop's University in Lennoxville, Quebec from August 2008 until June 30, 2023.

In 2013, he was made a Member of the Order of Canada "for establishing several transformative civic organizations in Montreal and for his dedication to building bridges between the city’s English- and French-speaking communities".

Goldbloom was appointed as the chair of the Canadian Broadcasting Corporation on April 3, 2018, for a five-year term.

On December 15, 2022, his term was renewed for another five years.
