= Richard Holden (Canadian politician) =

Canadian politician

Richard B. Holden

Member of the Legislative Assembly of Quebec for Westmount-Saint-Georges

Personal details
- Born: July 7, 1931
- Died: September 18, 2005 (aged 74) Marché Atwater apartment, Montreal
- Cause of death: Suicide
- Party: Independent
- Children: Arthur, Christopher, Caroline
- Occupation: Politician and lawyer

Richard B. Holden (7 July 1931 – September 18, 2005) was a lawyer and member of the provincial legislature of Quebec, Canada. An obituary describes him as cynical and self-deprecating, a boulevardier and a maverick.

== Personal life ==
Richard Holden was the son of John Hastie Holden and Marguerite Holden Hutcheson. His father was an engineer; his grandfather found fortune with a company that procured boots for soldiers during World War I. Holden studied law at McGill University and the Université de Montréal and political science at the Universite de Grenoble.

A litigator, he practiced primarily in the field of personal injury and professional malpractice cases at various law firms from his call to the bar in 1956 until elected to political office in 1989.

He divorced Helene Papachristidis in 1981. He was survived by children Christopher, Arthur, and Caroline.

== Political career ==
Holden first entered politics running as an independent candidate in the district of Westmount-Saint-Georges in 1962. He stood opposed to Hydro-Québec's nationalization. He finished second, ahead of the Union Nationale candidate.

Holden also ran unsuccessfully for the Progressive Conservatives in the 1979 federal election in the riding of Dollard placing a distant second place.

He was elected to the legislature in the 1989 election in Westmount as a candidate of the federalist, English-rights Equality Party, but was expelled from the party caucus for balking at party discipline.

After briefly sitting as an independent, he shocked his predominantly English-speaking constituents when he crossed the floor to join the sovereigntist Parti Québécois (PQ) in 1992. Holden's brother, John Rodney Clement Holden, stopped speaking to him and threatened to change his name as a result of the defection.

Holden ran in the neighbouring Verdun riding in the 1994 election as a PQ candidate. However, he was defeated. After the election, the PQ government appointed Holden to the province's rental housing board, on which he served until 1999.

== Death ==
Suffering from chronic, debilitating back pain, Holden committed suicide at the age of 74 by jumping from the eighth-floor balcony of his Atwater Market apartment in Montreal.

National Assembly of Quebec
Preceded by Richard French (Liberal)	MNA for Westmount; 1989–1994	Succeeded by District merged with Saint-Louis
