= École Maïmonide =

Coordinates: 45°28′2″N 73°39′42″W

- בית ספר הרמב״ם

Location
- Parkhaven Campus: 5615 Parkhaven Road; Côte Saint-Luc, Quebec, H4W 1X3 Jacob Safra Campus: 1900 Bourdon Road; Saint-Laurent, Quebec, H4M 2X7

Information
- Type: Private Jewish day school
- Religious affiliation: Judaism
- Established: 1969; 57 years ago
- President: Esther Krauze
- Grades: K–11
- Language: French, Hebrew
- Affiliation: FEEP, AJDS
- Website: ecolemaimonide.org

École Maïmonide (Hebrew: בֵּית סֵפֶר הַרַמְבַּ״ם) is a French-language Jewish day school located in Montreal, Quebec. The school has two campuses: the Parkhaven Campus in Côte Saint-Luc and the Jacob Safra Campus in Saint-Laurent.

== History ==
The years between 1950 and 1980 saw the departure of nearly the entire Jewish community from Morocco, mostly to Israel and France, as Arab nationalism and tension between Israel and its neighbours led them to seek refuge elsewhere. Several thousand Moroccan Jews emigrated to Quebec, with immigration reaching its peak between 1965 and 1967 as Canada relaxed its quotas for North African Jews, and Quebec's immigration laws began favouring francophones.

At the time of their arrival, Quebec's confessional school system prohibited Jews from attending French-language Catholic schools, relegating them to the English-language Protestant public school system. The existing Jewish community, which had historically associated with the anglophone minority, had no French institutions to offer the new immigrants.

At its fifteenth plenary session in May 1968, the Canadian Jewish Congress committed to assisting the Association séfarade francophone (the main organization of the francophone Jewish community) in creating a French-language Jewish school in Montreal. A committee representing both groups met with the Ministry of Education to discuss implementation of the plan. The project was approved, and École Maïmonide founded in 1969, initially operating in a wing of the Catholic Saint Antonin School. The costs were shared by the Montreal Catholic School Commission, Allied Jewish Community Services, and the United Jewish Relief Agencies of Canada. In 1972, the school moved to its own premises in Côte Saint-Luc.

In 1990, the school opened its second campus in Saint-Laurent.

== Academics ==
In the 2018 Fraser Institute Quebec secondary school rankings, the Jacob Safra Campus was ranked 44th in the province, while the Parkhaven Campus was ranked 194th (out of 452).
