= Elisabeth Prass =

Canadian politician

Elisabeth Prass MNA

Member of the National Assembly of Quebec for D'Arcy-McGee
- Incumbent
- Assumed office October 3, 2022
- Preceded by: David Birnbaum

Personal details
- Born: 1979 (age 46–47) Montreal
- Party: Quebec Liberal Party
- Spouse: Deric D Davis

Elisabeth Prass is a Canadian politician who was elected to the National Assembly of Quebec in the 2022 Quebec general election. She represents the riding of D'Arcy-McGee as a member of the Quebec Liberal Party.

== Biography ==
After graduating from Outremont High School, Prass attended Dawson College. She then completed her Bachelor of Arts at Concordia University, earning a degree in Sociology with a minor in Political Science. Prass later attended McGill University, where she obtained a Certificate in International Business.

In 2006, she worked as a political attachée in the office of the Minister of Status of Women. That same year, Prass also served as a researcher and translator with the Parliamentary Wing Research Service, a position she held until 2007. She then worked as a policy advisor with the Office of the Minister of Economic Development, Innovation and Export Trade from 2008 to 2012.

Prass has also worked with VIA Rail Canada as a Senior Advisor for Government and Community Relations in 2022.

Prior to her election to the legislature, Prass was the director of the D’Arcy-McGee riding office from 2014 to 2021.

As of October 27, 2023, she serves as the Official Opposition Critic for Social Services, Mental Health, Homelessness and People Living with a Handicap or on the Autism Spectrum. Prass also serves as the Official Opposition Critic for Relations with English-Speaking Quebecers since June 26, 2025.

From June 2024 to May 2025, Prass acted as a member of the Special Commission on the Impacts of Screens and Social Networks on the Health and Development of Young People.

Prass is the mother of two sons, one of whom is disabled. She lives in Montreal with her husband, Deric D. Davis.

== Electoral record ==
2022 Quebec general election: D'Arcy-McGee
Party	Candidate	Votes	%	±%
Liberal	Elisabeth Prass	13,298	51.41	-22.91
Conservative	Bonnie Feigenbaum	5,677	21.95	+17.46
Québec solidaire	Hilal Pilavci	2,203	8.52	+1.27
Coalition Avenir Québec	Junlian Leblanc	1,529	5.91	-0.49
Canadian	Marc Perez	1,285	4.97	–
Parti Québécois	Renée-Claude Lafontaine	648	2.51	-0.05
Bloc Montreal	Joel Debellefeuille	613	2.37	–
Green	Moussa Seck	547	2.11	-1.15
Marxist–Leninist	Diane Johnston	66	0.26	-0.04
Total valid votes		25,866	98.96	
Total rejected ballots		273	1.04	
Turnout		26,139	47.49	
Electors on the lists		55,044		
