= Victor Goldbloom =

Canadian politician (1923–2016)

Victor Goldbloom CC OQ

4th Commissioner of Official Languages
- In office 1991–1999
- Preceded by: D'Iberville Fortier
- Succeeded by: Dyane Adam

Member of the National Assembly of Quebec for D'Arcy-McGee
- In office 1966–1979
- Succeeded by: Herbert Marx

Minister of Municipal Affairs and the Environment
- In office 1973–1976

Personal details
- Born: Victor Charles Goldbloom; July 31, 1923 Montreal, Quebec, Canada
- Died: February 15, 2016 (aged 92) Montreal, Quebec, Canada
- Party: Liberal
- Spouse: Sheila Barshay-Rothstein (m. 1948)
- Children: Michael Goldbloom; Jonathan Goldbloom; Susan Restler

Victor Charles Goldbloom CC OQ (July 31, 1923 – February 15, 2016) was a Canadian pediatrician, lecturer, and politician.

== Early life and education ==
He was born in Montreal, the son of Jewish pediatrician Alton Goldbloom and Annie Ballon. He studied at Selwyn House School and Lower Canada College. He studied at McGill University receiving his BSc in 1944, his MD in 1945, his DipEd in 1950 and his DLitt in 1992. Dr. Goldbloom was assistant resident at the Babies' Hospital of the Columbia Presbyterian Medical Center, in New York.

== Career ==
He was a professor of pediatrics and of medicine at McGill University from 1950 to 1970. He was elected in 1966 as the MNA for the Montreal riding of D'Arcy-McGee. He was re-elected in 1970, 1973, and 1976. While Robert Bourassa was Premier of Quebec, Goldbloom was Minister of State responsible for Quality of Environment (1970–73). In 1973, he was appointed Minister of Municipal Affairs as well as Quebec's first Minister of the Environment, serving in both positions until the Liberal government's defeat in 1976. Goldbloom was in charge of the Olympic Installations Board for the 1976 Summer Olympics in Montreal.

He was the first member of the Jewish community to become a cabinet minister in the Quebec government. He kept his seat in the 1976 provincial election that defeated the Liberal government and sat on the Opposition benches until he resigned his seat on October 16, 1979 after Claude Ryan became Liberal leader.

Subsequently, from 1980 to 1987, he was CEO of the Canadian Council of Christians and Jews.

From 1991 until 1999, he was Canada's fourth Commissioner of Official Languages. During his tenure, Commissioner Goldbloom conducted two comprehensive studies. The first study examined the availability of services in both official languages in offices designated bilingual, which concluded that the federal government's bilingualism was not yet fully implemented nor functional. The second study focused on the implementation of Part VII of the Official Languages Act by the federal government and suggested different ways that Section 41 of the Official Languages Act could be implemented. In this report, Goldbloom suggested assigning a role of Coordinator of Language Policy at the Privy Council Office.

In 2009, he expressed concerns on the state of Catholic-Jewish relations after the lifting of the excommunications of the bishops of the Society of Saint Pius X.

Goldbloom died of a heart attack on February 15, 2016.

== Family ==
In June 1948, he married Sheila Barshay (1925-2022) of Montreal, a social worker who was later named to the Order of Canada. Their sons are Michael Goldbloom, Principal and Vice-Chancellor of Bishop's University and former publisher of the Toronto Star and the Montreal Gazette, and Jonathan Goldbloom, chair of the board of directors of Via Rail and Hockey Canada. Their daughter, Susan Restler, lives in Brooklyn, New York.

His brother Richard Goldbloom was also a pediatrician, who worked in Halifax, Nova Scotia at Dalhousie University and at the Izaak Walton Killam Hospital for Children.

== Honours ==
- Officer of the Order of Canada (1983), was promoted to Companion in 2000.
- Officer of the National Order of Quebec. (1991)
- Honorary Doctorate from the University of Ottawa.(1994)
- Honorary Doctorate from the Université Sainte-Anne at Church Point (Pointe de l'Église), Nova Scotia (1996)
- James H. Graham Award of the Royal College of Physicians and Surgeons of Canada (1996)
- Knight of the Order of St. Sylvester (2012)

== Sheila and Victor Goldbloom Distinguished Community Service Award ==
In June 2009, the Quebec Community Groups Network (QCGN) established the Sheila and Victor Goldbloom Distinguished Community Service Award in their honor.

In September 2009, the first awards were presented to lawyer and longtime promoter of quality and English rights Casper Bloom, Eastern Townships-based health-care advocate Marjorie Goodfellow, and researcher Jack Jedwab, who has contributed to the knowledge and understanding of English-speaking Quebec.

== Electoral record ==
1966 Quebec general election: D'Arcy-McGee
Party	Candidate	Votes	%
Liberal	Victor Goldbloom	24,709	90.57
Union Nationale	Boris Garmaise	1,548	5.67
RIN	Louise Belzile	895	3.28
Ralliement national	Gilles Côté	129	0.47
Total valid votes		27,281	100.00
Rejected and declined ballots		699	
Turnout		27,980	60.88
Electors on the lists		45,962	
Source: Official Results, Le Directeur général des élections du Québec.

1970 Quebec general election: D'Arcy-McGee
Party	Candidate	Votes	%	±%
Liberal	Victor Charles Goldbloom	36,543	90.41	-0.17
Parti Québécois	Paul Unterberg	3,230	7.99	N/A
Union Nationale	Léonard Rosen	647	1.60	-4.07

1973 Quebec general election: D'Arcy-McGee
Party	Candidate	Votes	%	±%
Liberal	Victor Charles Goldbloom	26,958	93.77	+3.36
Parti Québécois	Jacqueline Dugas	1,221	4.25	-3.74
Ralliement créditiste	John Holmes	418	1.45	N/A
Union Nationale	Florian Prévost	152	0,53	-1.07

1976 Quebec general election: D'Arcy-McGee
Party	Candidate	Votes	%	±%
Liberal	Victor Charles Goldbloom	21,248	68.03	-25.74
Union Nationale	Barry Fridhandler	7,058	22.60	+22.07
Parti Québécois	Jacques Mackay	1,476	4.73	+0.48
Democratic Alliance	Elie Chalouh	950	3.04	–
Independent	Max Wollach	417	1.33	–
Ralliement créditiste	Gaëtan Gauthier	83	0.27	-1.18

Government offices
Preceded by D'Iberville Fortier	Commissioner of Official Languages; 1991–1999	Succeeded by Dyane Adam
