= Cy Strulovitch =

Canadian basketball player (1925–2020)

Sidney "Cy" Strulovitch (20 June 1925 – 11 June 2020) was a Canadian basketball player who competed in the 1948 Summer Olympics. He was born in Côte Saint-Luc, Quebec.

== Career ==
Initially he pursued a career in baseball and was drafted as a pitcher by the minor league Montreal Royals, but would later switch to play basketball from 1948, continuing on to the 1950s.
