= David Birnbaum =

Canadian politician, activist, and journalist

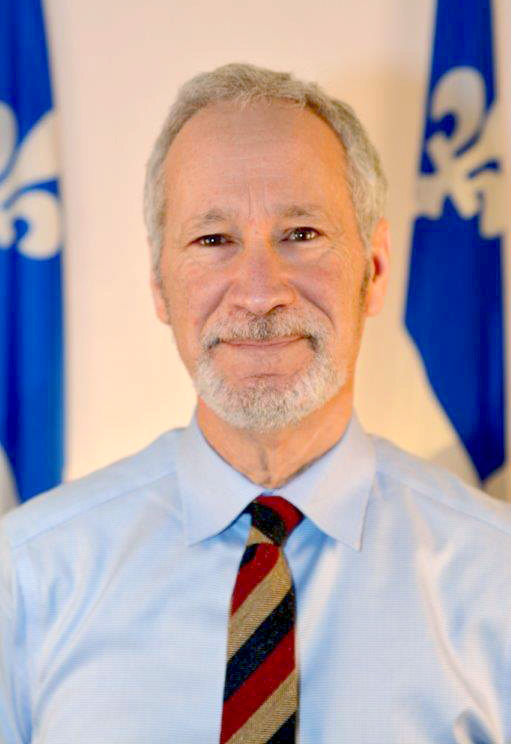
- David Birnbaum in 2016

Member of the National Assembly of Quebec for D'Arcy-McGee
- In office April 7, 2014 – August 28, 2022
- Preceded by: Lawrence Bergman
- Succeeded by: Elisabeth Prass

Personal details
- Born: April 8, 1956 (age 70) Montreal, Quebec
- Party: Quebec Liberal Party
- Occupation: journalist, administrator

David Birnbaum (born April 8, 1956) is a Canadian politician, activist, and former journalist. Birnbaum was elected to the National Assembly of Quebec in the 2014 election. He represented the electoral district of D'Arcy-McGee as a member of the Quebec Liberal Party until his retirement from politics at the 2022 Quebec general election. He was the Opposition Critic for Indigenous Affairs, and was formerly the Parliamentary Assistant to the Minister of Education and Higher Education, and was the Parliamentary Assistant to the Premier of Quebec. He sits on the Committee on Citizen Relations.

== Biography ==
Birnaum was born in Montreal, Quebec. He is a former journalist at The Gazette and Communications Officer at the old Protestant School Board of Greater Montreal, Centraide-Montreal Board member and long-time Big Brother.

Birnbaum held the position of executive director of the Quebec English School Boards Association from 2004 to 2014, Executive Director of Canadian Jewish Congress, Quebec Region from 1998 to 2004, executive director of Alliance Quebec from 1990 to 1998. In those capacities, he strived to promote and defend minority concerns while strengthening relationships with Québec's francophone majority community.

He and his wife have two children, Vincent and Zoë.

== See also ==
- D'Arcy-McGee
- Quebec Liberal Party
