= Conrad Poirier =

Québécois photographer

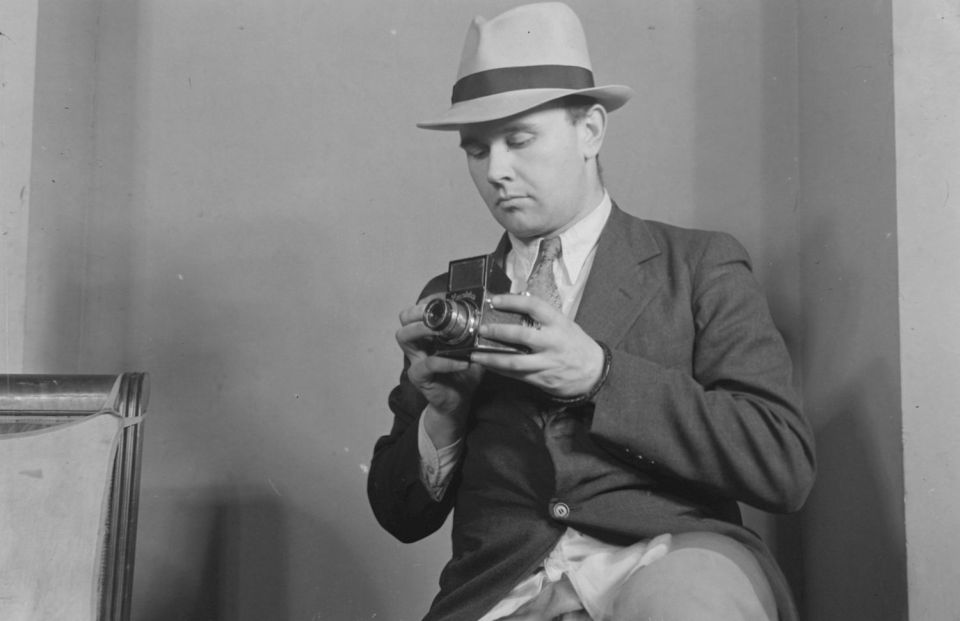
- Born: July 17, 1912; Montreal
- Died: January 12, 1968 (aged 55); Montreal West
- Occupation: Photographer

Conrad Poirier (born in Montreal July 17, 1912 – died January 12, 1968, in Montreal West) was a Quebec photographer, a pioneer of photojournalism in Quebec.

== Biography ==
Self-taught photographer, Poirier began his career in 1932 with a Speed Graphic, a device that uses a 4 × 5 film, Poirier captures images of sports and cultural events Montréal. In addition, he photographed many famous Quebec personalities of the time. He was a freelance writer and sold his photos to large newspapers: The Gazette, Montreal Standard, La Patrie, La Presse. His customers included thirty Canadian media institutions both in French and English.

== Honors and awards ==
Popular entertainment and leisure places for Montrealers (Belmont Park, the Delorimier Stadium, Montreal Forum, the evenings at the chalet de la Montagne on Mount Royal, the public beaches of Saint Helen's Island and LaSalle), were the subject of several photo essays by Poirier for which he won numerous awards: Grand National Canadian Prize, Canadian Press Prize, Prize of the Association of Photographers of Canada.
