= Herbert Marx (politician) =

Canadian politician (1932–2020)

Herbert Marx (March 16, 1932 – March 19, 2020) was a Canadian lawyer, university law professor, politician, and judge. He was a member of the National Assembly of Quebec from 1979 to 1989, a cabinet minister, and a Justice of the Quebec Superior Court.

== Biography ==
Herbert Marx was born in Montreal to a Jewish family, his father Robert, a tailor, and his mother Miriam Marx in 1932 and graduated from Baron Byng High School. He was uninterested in school as a youth, preferring to hang out in pool halls, and failed grade 9. He worked selling encyclopedias door-to-door before working in the lighting industry from 1955 to 1965, becoming vice-president of Verd-A-Ray Industries Ltd.

He returned to his studies and attended Sir George Williams University (B.A., 1958); Université de Montréal (M.A., English Literature); and Harvard Law School (LL.M., 1969). Throughout his law studies, he received a number of prizes. Moreover, he was awarded the Prix du Barreau for having come first in the Quebec Bar Exams in 1968. He was also awarded scholarships by the Quebec and Canadian governments.

In 1967 and 1968 he articled in the law firm of Stikeman Elliott in Montreal. He joined the Faculty of Law at the Université de Montréal in July 1969. Over the next ten years, he taught constitutional law, civil liberties and poverty law. Between 1969 and 1979, he was a consultant to the Quebec Ministries of Justice, Education and Intergovernmental Affairs as well as to the Canada Law Reform Commission, the Quebec Civil Code Revision Office, the Quebec Gendron Commission on Language Rights and the Montreal Island School Council. He was also a visiting professor at the Université du Québec à Montréal and McGill University Faculty of Law. In 1969, he was a founding member of the Pointe Saint-Charles Legal Aid Clinic in Montreal. He was a Commissioner of the Quebec Human Rights Commission from 1975 to 1979, and a member of the Consultative Committee of the Institute of Intergovernmental Relations at Queen's University, Kingston, Ontario from 1977 to 1982.

In 1979, he was elected in a by-election as the member from D'Arcy-McGee to the Quebec National Assembly. He was re-elected in 1981 and 1985. He was Minister of Justice and Attorney General of Quebec from 1985 to 1988 and in addition served variously as solicitor general, minister responsible for consumer protection, and minister of public security. He resigned first as justice minister in late 1988, and six months later as a Member of the National Assembly in protest of the Quebec government's decision to use the notwithstanding clause of the Constitution of Canada to override a Supreme Court of Canada ruling that a law banning non-French outdoor signs was unconstitutional.

He was appointed a Justice of Quebec Superior Court in 1989 by the federal government and took mandatory retirement in 2007.

He was active in a number of non-governmental organizations: Co-chair of the McGill Consortium for Human Rights Advocacy Training; Co-Chair of the McGill Middle East Programme in Civil Society and Peace Building; Governor of Tel Aviv University; President of the Association for Canadian Studies; Member of the Board of the Tolerance Foundation.

He is the author and co-author of the following books:

- Les Problèmes constitutionnels posés par la restructuration scolaire de l'île de Montréal (with F. Chevrette and A. Tremblay), Editeur officiel du Québec, 83 pages.
- Les Grand arrêts de la jurisprudence constitutionnelle au Canada, Les Presses de l'Université de Montréal, 761 pages.
- Droits et pauvreté au Québec: documents, notes et problèmes (with J. Hetu), Les Edition Thémis, 566 pages.
- The Law and the Poor in Canada (with I. Cotler), Black Rose Books, 143 pages.
- Droit Constitutionnel (with F. Chevrette), Les Presses de l'Université de Montréal, 1728 pages.

He is also the author of many peer-reviewed articles on constitutional law, civil liberties and poverty law. He died on March 19, 2020, aged 88.

National Assembly of Quebec
Preceded by Victor Goldbloom	MNA for D'Arcy-McGee; 1979 – 1985	Succeeded by Robert Libman
