= Richard French (Canadian politician) =

Canadian politician

Richard D. French

Member of the National Assembly of Quebec for Westmount
- In office 1981–1989
- Preceded by: George Springate
- Succeeded by: Richard Holden

Personal details
- Born: February 25, 1947 (age 79) Montreal, Quebec
- Party: Liberal
- Education: University of British Columbia; University of Oxford
- Profession: Businessman, academic

Richard D. French CM (born February 25, 1947) is a Canadian businessman, academic, and a former politician.

Born in Montreal, Quebec, French received a Bachelor of Science degree from the University of British Columbia in 1968 and a D. Phil. from the University of Oxford in 1973. From 1971 to 1972, he was an assistant professor of history at Princeton University. From 1972 to 1973, he was an assistant adviser to the Ministry of State for Science and Technology. From 1973 to 1974, he was an advisor to the Science Council of Canada. From 1974 to 1977, he worked in the Privy Council Office. From 1977 to 1981, he was an associate professor at the Faculty of Management at McGill University. From 1978 to 1981, he was a partner at SECOR.

He was elected to the National Assembly of Quebec for the riding of Westmount in 1981. A Liberal, he was re-elected in 1985. He held various ministerial positions in the cabinet of Robert Bourassa. He did not run in 1989.

After leaving politics, he held various vice presidential positions at Bell Canada from 1989 to 1996. From 1996 to 1999, he was president and CEO of Tata Communications in Hyderabad, India. He was vice-chairman (telecommunications) of the Canadian Radio-Television and Telecommunications Commission from 2005 to 2007. In 2007, he became a professor at the University of Ottawa. He is currently the inaugural chairholder of the CN Paul M. Tellier Chair on Business and Public Policy.

He is the author of How Ottawa Decides: Planning and Industrial Policy-making 1968-1980 published in 1984. He is also the author of several scholarly articles including an analysis of the concept of political capital, and a provocative account of the ways in which academics misunderstand the nature of political office.

In December 2016, French was named a Member of the Order of Canada.
