= Côte-Saint-Luc–Hampstead–Montreal West =

Coordinates: 45°28′36.3″N 73°38′11.5″W

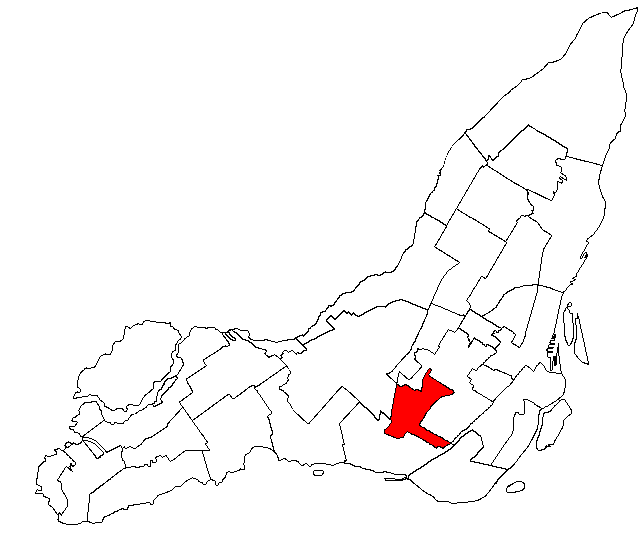

Côte Saint-Luc–Hampstead–Montreal West was a borough in the western part of Montreal, Quebec. It comprised the municipalities of Côte Saint-Luc, Hampstead, and Montreal West.

On January 1, 2002, all three municipalities were merged as part of the large-scale municipal reorganization by the provincial Parti Québécois government. On June 20, 2004, all three municipalities voted via referendum to return to independent municipalities, dissolving the borough effective January 1, 2006.

== See also ==
- List of former boroughs
- Montreal Merger
- Municipal reorganization in Quebec
