= Lawrence Bergman =

Canadian politician

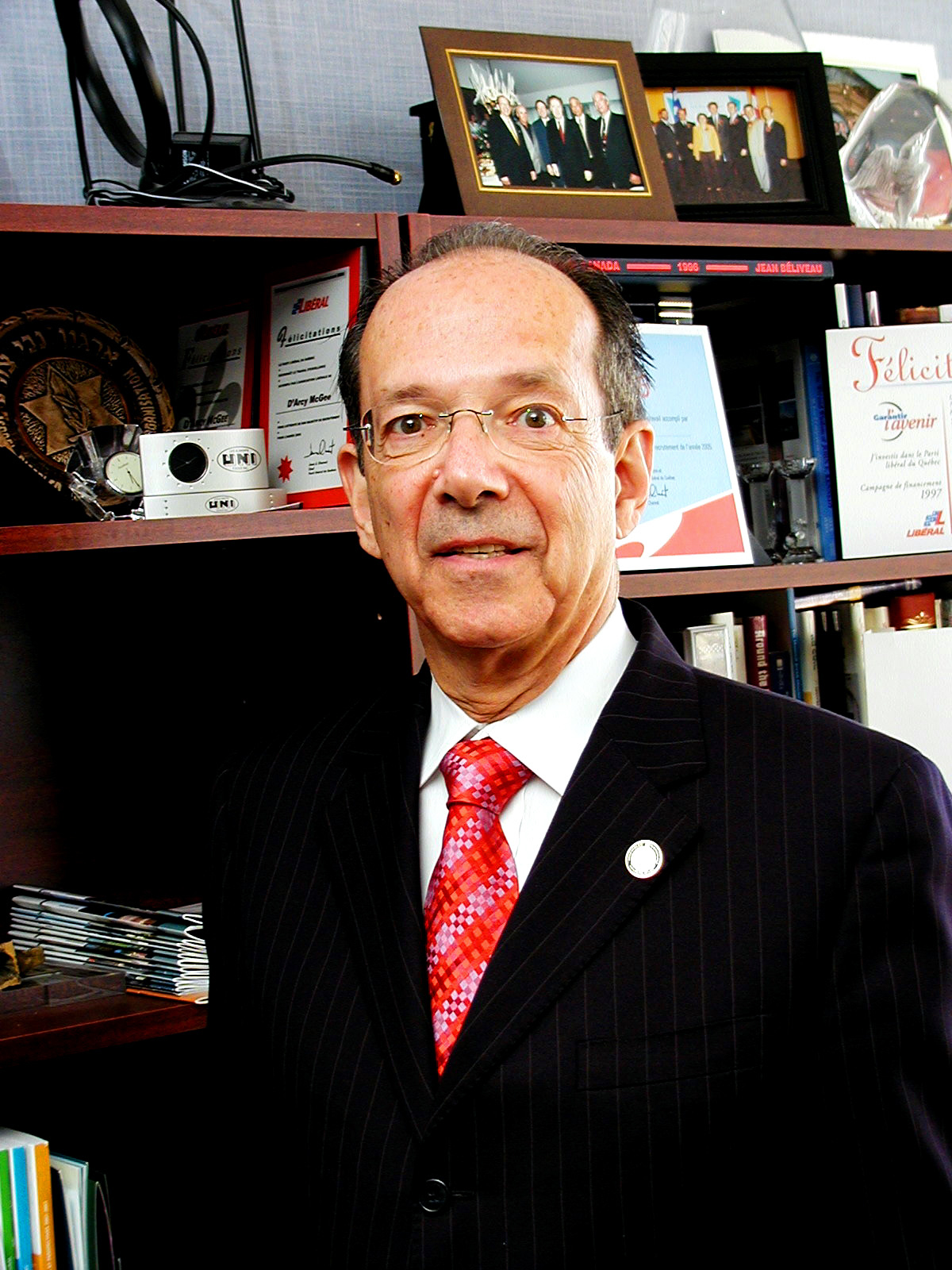

Member of the National Assembly of Quebec for D'Arcy-McGee
- In office September 12, 1994 – April 23, 2014
- Preceded by: Robert Libman
- Succeeded by: David Birnbaum

Personal details
- Born: December 6, 1940 (age 85) Montreal, Quebec
- Party: Quebec Liberal Party
- Education: Sir George Williams University; Université de Montréal

Lawrence S. Bergman (born December 6, 1940) is a Canadian politician in Quebec, Canada. He was a minister of the government of Quebec from 2003 to 2007, the Member of National Assembly of Quebec for the riding of D'Arcy-McGee in Montreal's west end from 1994 to 2014, and Chairperson of the Government Caucus in the parliamentary office of Quebec.

== Biography ==
Born in Montreal, Quebec, Bergman received a Bachelor of Arts from Sir George Williams University (now Concordia University) in 1961. In 1964, he received a Diploma from the Faculty of Law of Université de Montréal. He became a notary in 1965. He was a practicing notary until his nomination as Minister of Revenue by Jean Charest in 2003.

He was also a member of the disciplinary committee of the Chambre des notaires du Quebec. He also received several honors for his service among the Jewish Community while he was a council member of the Montreal Jewish Community, an honorary president of the Montreal's Jewish community centres and the director of Magen David Adom for Israel.

In the 1994 election, he was elected for the first time, winning 65.37% of the valid ballots against the incumbent Robert Libman, as a Liberal Member of the National Assembly of Quebec (MNA) for the Montreal riding of the D'Arcy-McGee, the only riding in Quebec with a Jewish majority and a safe Liberal riding. This riding has elected a Jewish MNA in every election since its creation in 1965. He was re-elected in the 1998 (winning 90.61% of the valid ballots) and 2003 elections (winning 91.29% of the valid ballots). In 2003, he was appointed Minister of Revenue. He was re-elected for a fourth term in 2007 and a fifth term in the 2008 but was not named in the Jean Charest Cabinet in both occasions although he was named in 2008 the President of the Cabinet Caucus.

He retired following the 2014 election and was succeeded by David Birnbaum.

== Notes ==
1. 1994 election results
2. 1998 election results
3. 2003 election results

Political offices
Preceded by Guy Julien	Minister of Revenue; 2003–2007	Succeeded by Jean-Marc Fournier
