= Equality Party (Quebec) =

Equality Party Parti Égalité
- Founder: Robert Libman
- Founded: April 7, 1989
- Dissolved: December 31, 2012
- Headquarters: Montreal West, Quebec, Canada
- Ideology: Quebec federalism Canadian nationalism Anglophone interests
- Political position: Big tent
- Colours: Navy blue and red (unofficial)

The Equality Party (French: Parti Égalité) was a political party in Quebec, Canada, that promoted the use of English in Quebec on an equal basis with French. Four Equality Party members were elected to Quebec's National Assembly in 1989, as part of an anglophone reaction to changes made by the governing Liberals to Quebec's language law. The party had no success in subsequent elections, and stopped organizing after the 2003 Quebec election.

== History ==
=== Foundation to 1989 election ===
The party was formed in 1989 as a reaction to then-Premier Robert Bourassa invoking the "Notwithstanding clause" of the Canadian constitution to override a Supreme Court ruling overturning parts of the Charter of the French Language (commonly known as "Bill 101"). The court ruling would have allowed languages other than French to appear on store signs and outdoor advertising; the government instead allowed other languages only on small signs inside shops. Another issue that fed Equality Party support was the Quebec Liberal Party's forcing anglophone Members of the Quebec National Assembly (MNAs) to condemn a report from the Official Languages Commissioner suggesting Quebec anglophones felt "humiliated" by laws such as Bill 101.

The Equality Party's platform called for equality of both languages (French and English) in Quebec, opposing Bill 101 which made French the sole official language of Quebec, imposed restrictions on the use of English on public signs, and required children to attend school in French unless one of their parents went to school in English in Canada. The Equality Party drew virtually all of its support from elements of Quebec's anglophone minority, and only ran candidates in electoral districts with very high anglophone populations.

The party first came to prominence in the 1989 general election, when it won four seats on Montreal Island in the National Assembly with 3.7% of the popular vote. Along with its then-sister party, the Unity Party (which ran candidates outside the Montreal Island), it won 4.7% of the provincial popular vote. The winning candidates were Gordon Atkinson, Neil Cameron, Richard Holden and party leader Robert Libman, who won popular votes ranging from 41 percent to 58 percent in their respective ridings.

=== In the National Assembly 1989-1994 ===
The party did not receive official party status in Quebec's National Assembly, being eight members short of the required twelve necessary for recognition, nor had they received 20% of the popular vote which would have otherwise qualified them for official status. The Liberals and Parti Quebecois agreed that the Equality Party caucus would receive some of the privileges of an "official party", including having their members' seats in the National Assembly placed together and office space allocated close to each other, as well as some research funding; however, they were not allocated a guaranteed number of questions in the National Assembly's daily Question Period, meaning that their opportunity to speak was left to the Speaker's discretion. (This arrangement was repeated in later elections when Action démocratique du Québec won fewer seats in the National Assembly than required for official status.)

The four members took an active role in National Assembly debates, most notably when Party leader Robert Libman made headlines by using his parliamentary privilege to reveal the details of confidential, money-losing contracts signed between Hydro-Québec and some of Quebec's aluminum producers.

The party voted against Bill 150, a law providing for a referendum on sovereignty for Quebec (which was later cancelled in favour of a referendum on the Charlottetown Accord).

The Unity Party merged with the Equality Party on May 7, 1990, increasing the party's membership to what the party reported as 16,000. The party's published financial statements, however, reported that only $7,795 in membership dues were collected in 1990, down 75% from 1989 and enough to account for only 1,559 dues-paying members.

From 1990 onward, the party suffered from frequent and public infighting, clashing over personalities and over issues such as whether to support the Meech Lake Accord and Charlottetown Accord. This peaked when Richard Holden, Equality MNA for the overwhelmingly Anglophone Westmount riding, left the party and eventually defected to the Parti Québécois, a party which had little support in Westmount due to its support of Bill 101 and Quebec independence. Three of the Equality Party's four elected members, including Libman, the party's leader, quit the party before the next election.

In addition to the infighting and defections, the Equality Party's raison d'être arguably vanished when the government amended the Charter of the French Language in 1993 to allow for more prominent English language text on commercial signs, so that the law no longer needed the use of the "notwithstanding clause" to withstand constitutional challenge. Furthermore, opinion polls prior to the 1994 election showed a close race between the two largest parties (the Liberals and the Parti Québécois), with the PQ explicitly promising an independence referendum if it was victorious. All of these factors encouraged Equality Party voters from 1989 to switch their support back to the Liberals in 1994.

=== Post-1994 activities ===
The Equality Party never repeated its electoral success of 1989. Cameron, the party's sole remaining MNA, was defeated in the 1994 general election. Two subsequent general elections in 1998 and 2003 did nothing to improve the party's fortunes.

The party continued to exist for another decade in a desultory fashion. Its remaining members held meetings, maintained a website and ran candidates for office until 2003. During these years, the party promoted political positions such as the reversal of the 2002 municipal mergers on the island of Montreal. Following the party's poor showing in the 2003 election, its leader, Keith Henderson, announced he would resign once a new leader was chosen, which never occurred. The party stopped holding meetings, updating its website or running candidates in elections; however, it continued to file annual reports with the Director General of Elections until it was removed from the list of registered political parties at the end of 2012.

In 2013, a group attempted to restart the party under the name of "Equality Party 2.0 - Parti Égalité 2.0"; the group abandoned efforts due to lack of support.

== Leaders ==
- Robert Libman (1989–1994)
- Keith Henderson (1994-2012)

== Members of the Quebec National Assembly ==
- Gordon Atkinson (1989–1994)
- Neil Cameron (1989–1994)
- Robert Libman (1989–1994)
- Richard Holden (1989–1992)

== Election results ==
General election	# of candidates	# of elected candidates	% of popular vote
1989	19	4	3.69%
1994	17	0	0.29%
1998	24	0	0.31%
2003	21	0	0.11%
2007	0	-	-
2008	0	-	-
2012	0	-	-

== See also ==
- Politics of Quebec
- List of Quebec general elections
- List of Quebec premiers
- List of Quebec leaders of the Opposition
- National Assembly of Quebec
- Timeline of Quebec history
- Political parties in Quebec
- Partition of Quebec
- Canadian Party of Quebec
- Bloc Montreal
