= Alex Tyrrell =

Canadian politician

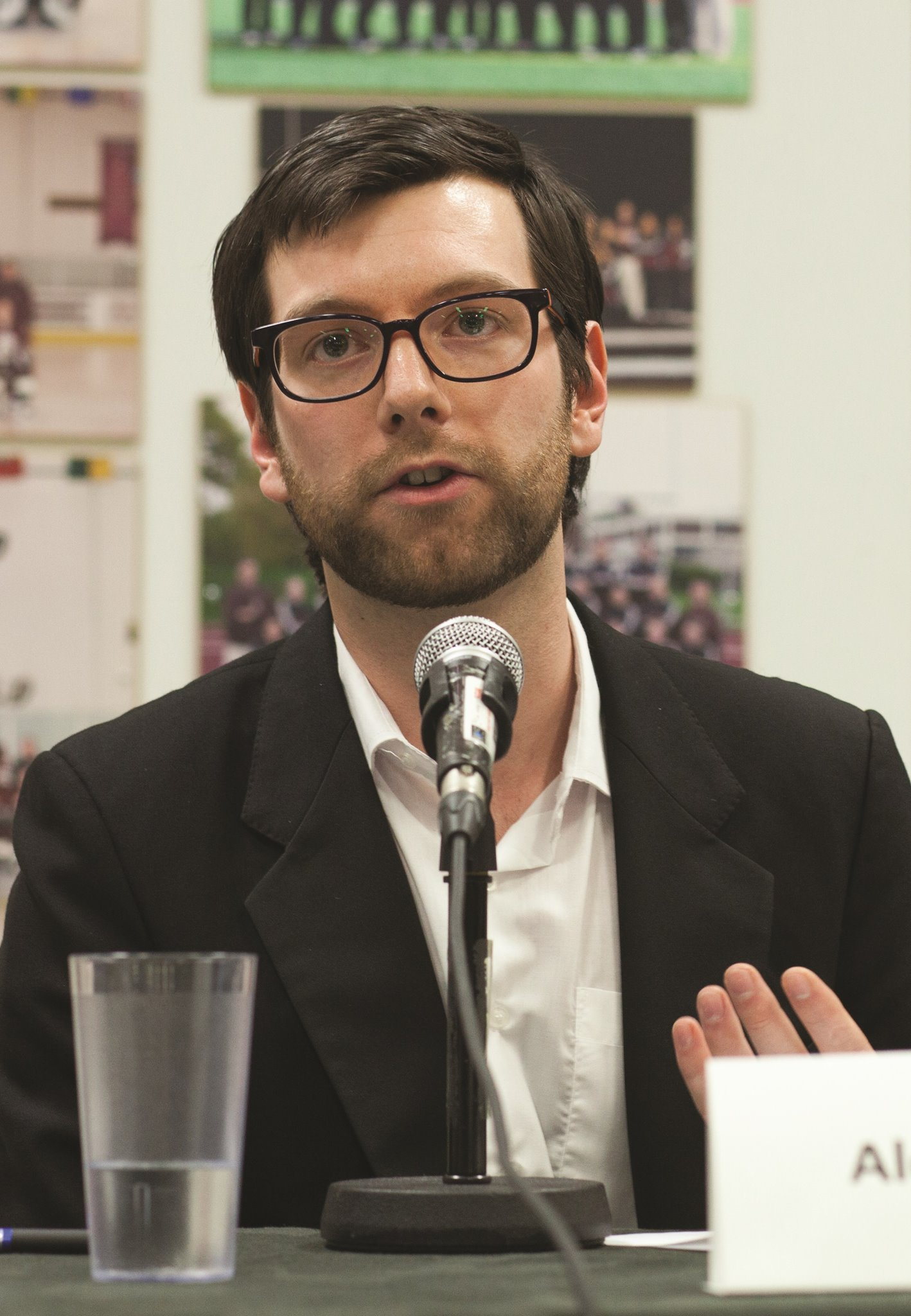

Leader of the Green Party of Quebec
- Incumbent
- Assumed office 21 September 2013
- Preceded by: Claude Sabourin

Personal details
- Born: 23 March 1988 (age 38) Beaconsfield, Quebec, Canada
- Party: Green Party of Quebec
- Other political affiliations: Green Party of Canada (2012–2022); New Democratic Party (2006–2012)
- Education: Concordia University
- Website: www.pvq.qc.ca

Alex Tyrrell (born 23 March 1988) is a Canadian politician who has served as the leader of the Green Party of Quebec since 2013.

== Early life and education ==
Born in 1988, Tyrrell grew up in Beaconsfield on the West Island of Montreal.

Following his secondary education, Tyrrell enrolled in the Mechanical Engineering Technology program at Montreal's Dawson College. During his technical studies at the CEGEP, he worked on the issues of biofuels and became involved in an advocacy campaign to finance a project of design of electric vehicles for the students of his department.

In 2011, Tyrrell enrolled in an environmental science program at Concordia University in Montreal, focusing his studies to better understand the problems of pollution, the impacts of climate change, and issues related to the environment. During the course of his degree, Tyrrell studied the negative environmental impact of mining and resource extraction in Quebec. He graduated in June 2017.

== Social activism ==
In spring 2012, Tyrrell was actively involved in the Maple Spring student protests.

Later in 2012, Tyrrell actively participated in the Indigenous rights 'Idle No More' demonstrations in Montreal, meeting movement leader Raymond Robinson. During Robinson's hunger strikes, he and Tyrrell developed a friendship, leading to Tyrrell, in April 2013, being named communications officer for the project. Tyrrell participated in meetings with the Chief of The First Nations Assembly and the Minister of Aboriginal Affairs.

Tyrrell's involvement with Idle No More led to his participation in Indigenous-led protests against shale gas exploration in New Brunswick.

== Federal politics ==
Tyrrell became involved in politics in 2006 with the New Democratic Party during the early years of Jack Layton's leadership.

During his involvement with the New Democrats, Tyrrell held several positions on the Executive Committee of the riding of Lac St-Louis and participated in the 2008 and 2011 election campaigns, serving as the chief organizer for the NDP campaign in this constituency and, subsequently, as president of the local association. Following the campaign, he volunteered with Pierrefonds-Dollard MP Lysane Blanchette-Lamothe.

During the 2011-2012 NDP leadership race, he supported the candidacy of Nathan Cullen, becoming the co-organizer of his campaign in Quebec. Following the victory of Thomas Mulcair, Tyrrell stepped back from the federal political scene and turned his commitment to the student movement.

Tyrrell had been mulling a run for the leadership of the federal Green Party after Elizabeth May gave mixed comments about whether or not she would resign the leadership after the election. May subsequently resigned on 4 November 2019, triggering a leadership election. He declared his candidacy on 15 January 2020, but suspended his campaign on 3 June 2020.

On March 4, 2022, eight days after Russia began an invasion of Ukraine, Tyrrell published a thread on Twitter suggesting that Russia's demands regarding Ukraine were reasonable. He added that while he was against the violence, he felt that Ukraine should not be supplied with weapons and materials, but should instead engage in negotiations with Russia and consider their demands. His comments were immediately met with fierce criticism. Bernard Drainville, former member of the National Assembly of Quebec, accused Tyrell of "adopting Putin’s rhetoric ... and being his accomplice", while CAQ Deputy Christopher Skeete noted this was a "horrible insult to the Jewish community". Quebec politician Benoit Charette called on Tyrell to apologize immediately to both the Ukrainian & Jewish community. His comments were denounced by the leadership of both the Ontario and Federal Green Parties, with the latter designating his views as "abhorrent". Tyrrell later conducted an interview with Toronto-based radio station CFRB, during which he acknowledged the widespread criticism of his position. Alex Tyrrell argues that activism for peace was always carried by the left and the Green Party both in Canada and in Quebec and his position reflects that.

In July 2022, Tyrrell was expelled from the federal Green Party while preparing to launch a leadership bid, in part due to the controversy surrounding his comments about the war in Ukraine. As of 2022, he was appealing the decision.

== Green Party of Quebec ==
Following the student protests of 2012, Tyrrell became interested in provincial politics, becoming involved with the Green Party of Quebec by submitting his candidacy in the riding of Jacques-Cartier.

During the 2014 campaign, Tyrrell finished in third in the riding of Notre-Dame-de-Grâce with 4.5% of the vote, earning the second highest number of votes for a Green candidate in that election.

=== Party leader (2013–present) ===
Following the party's sagging fortunes in the 2012 campaign, including a public incident in which a journalist with the newspaper La Presse was able to secure candidacy with the party without vetting, incumbent Green Party leader Claude Sabourin resigned. Tyrrell was the first candidate to declare his intention to seek the leadership of the party.

Tyrrell campaigned on the slogan "Uniting the PVQ", a direct reference to the internal divisions that he saw as preventing the party from advancing in Quebec politics. He proposed to unite the party around progressive values, to modernize the program, and to return the party clearly to the left of the provincial scene. Tyrrell proposed to broaden the party's environment-oriented agenda to present a more comprehensive platform that called for massive investments in public services such as health and education.

On 21 September 2013, Tyrrell won the leadership of the party, beating Sainte-Justine-de-Newton mayor Patricia Domingos, former Action démocratique du Québec candidate Marc-André Beauchemin, and party activist Pierre Étienne Loignon.

Soon after assuming the leadership of the party, Tyrrell was faced with opposition from the party's executive. Tyrrell summarily dismissed the executive on 3 December 2013, an act which dismissed members said violated the party's statutes and regulations.

Following the calming of internal tensions, Tyrrell participated in the adopted a new political program for the party that addressed environmental issues, recognized social struggles, and adopted an eco-socialist position for the 2014 general election.

Soon after his election as leader, Tyrrell faced off against newly elected Liberal leader Philippe Couillard in a by-election held in Outremont.

By positioning the Quebec Green Party on the left of the political spectrum, Tyrrell and federal Green Party leader Elizabeth May had a public falling out, with leaked emails indicating May had said to federal members: "Please, as a federal Green, do nothing to associate yourself with Alex [Tyrrell, leader of the Quebec Green Party]." May's positions on issues such as being against the federal Green Party's support for the BDS movement led to Tyrrell labeling May's leadership as "detrimental" to the green movement in Canada.

During the 2017 by-election in the riding of Gouin, Tyrrell announced he would be seeking the seat, and positioned the Green Party of Quebec as a progressive federalist political party.

Tyrrell again contested a by-election in 2017, seeking the seat of Louis-Hébert, left vacant after the resignation of Employment Minister Sam Hamad.

Tyrrell again contested the 2018 provincial election and a by-election in 2018.

== Electoral record ==
2026 Quebec general election: Notre-Dame-de-Grâce
** Preliminary results — Not yet official **
Party	Candidate	Votes	%	±%
Liberal	Désirée McGraw	16,355	61.04	
Québec solidaire	Élise Davignon	4,761	17.77	
Conservative	Guillaume St-Pierre	2,126	7.93	
Parti Québécois	Vincent Hubert	1,586	5.92	
Coalition Avenir Québec	Kaan Altintas	767	2.86	
Green	Alex Tyrrell	679	2.53	
Canadian	Christian Turgeon	356	1.33	
Marxist–Leninist	Rachel Hoffman	103	0.38	
Communist	Ivan Byard	63	0.24	
Total valid votes				
Total rejected ballots				
Turnout			57.09	
Electors on the lists			–	–
Source: Élections Québec

2022 Quebec general election: Notre-Dame-de-Grâce
Party	Candidate	Votes	%	±%
Liberal	Désirée McGraw	12,918	50.46	-12.52
Québec solidaire	Élisabeth Labelle	3,967	15.49	+3.65
Conservative	Roy Eappen	2,087	8.15	+6.64
Coalition Avenir Québec	Geneviève Lemay	1,877	7.33	-0.68
Bloc Montreal	Balarama Holness	1,701	6.64	–
Parti Québécois	Cloé Rose Jenneau	1,302	5.09	-0.37
Green	Alex Tyrrell	956	3.73	-2.94
Canadian	Constantine Eliadis	723	2.82	–
Marxist–Leninist	Rachel Hoffman	71	0.28	-0.03
Total valid votes		25,602	98.72	–
Total rejected ballots		332	1.28	–
Turnout		25,934	55.76	-0.38
Electors on the lists		46,506	–	–

Quebec provincial by-election, April 11, 2022: Marie-Victorin Resignation of Catherine Fournier
Party	Candidate	Votes	%	±%
Coalition Avenir Québec	Shirley Dorismond	5,697	34.95	+6.56
Parti Québécois	Pierre Nantel	4,902	30.07	–0.74
Québec solidaire	Shophika Vaithyanathasarma	2,316	14.21	–7.46
Conservative	Anne Casabonne	1,696	10.40	–
Liberal	Émilie Nollet	1,130	6.93	–8.28
Climat Québec	Martine Ouellet	310	1.90	–
Green	Alex Tyrrell	142	0.87	–1.28
Accès propriété et équité	Shawn Lalande McLean	42	0.26	–
Indépendance du Québec	Michel Blondin	21	0.13	–
Union Nationale	Michel Lebrun	17	0.10	–
Independent	Philippe Tessier	17	0.10	–
Équipe Autonomiste	Florent Portron	11	0.07	–0.09
Total valid votes		16,301	98.86	+0.70
Total rejected ballots		188	1.14	–0.70
Turnout		16,489	36.13	–26.78
Electors on the lists		45,636	–	
Source: Élections Québec
Coalition Avenir Québec gain from Parti Québécois		Swing		+3.65

Quebec provincial by-election, 10 December 2018 Resignation of Philippe Couillard
Party	Candidate	Votes	%	±%
Coalition Avenir Québec	Nancy Guillemette	8,369	54.53	+30.37
Parti Québécois	Thomas Gaudreault	2,688	17.51	–1.51
Liberal	William Laroche	2,334	15.21	–27.25
Québec solidaire	Luc-Antoine Cauchon	1,584	10.32	–0.38
Conservative	Carl C. Lamontagne	172	1.12	–0.60
Citoyens au pouvoir	Julie Boucher	121	1.12	–0.31
Green	Alex Tyrrell	80	0.52	
Total valid votes		15,384	99.45	
Total rejected ballots		85	0.55	–0.89
Turnout		15,433	34.67	–28.72
Electors on the list		44,509		
Coalition Avenir Québec gain from Liberal		Swing		+28.81

2018 Quebec general election: Verdun
Party	Candidate	Votes	%	±%
Liberal	Isabelle Melançon	11,054	35.51	-0.10
Québec solidaire	Vanessa Roy	7,457	23.95	+5.37
Coalition Avenir Québec	Nicole Leduc	6,343	20.38	+7.65
Parti Québécois	Constantin Fortier	3,929	12.62	-14.53
Green	Alex Tyrrell	1,157	3.72	-0.56
New Democratic	Raphaël Fortin	717	2.30	–
Conservative	Yedidya-Eitan Moryoussef	217	0.70	+0.05
Parti nul	Marc-André Milette	151	0.49	–
Bloc Pot	Hugo Richard	76	0.24	–
Marxist–Leninist	Eileen Studd	29	0.09	–
Total valid votes		31130	98.88	
Total rejected ballots		354	1.12	
Turnout		31,484	63.19	
Eligible voters		49,826		
Liberal hold		Swing		-2.74
Source(s) "Rapport des résultats officiels du scrutin". Élections Québec.

Quebec provincial by-election, 2 October 2017 On the resignation of Sam Hamad
Party	Candidate	Votes	%	±%
Coalition Avenir Québec	Geneviève Guilbault	12,091	51.04	+25.12
Liberal	Ihssane El Ghernati	4,433	18.71	–30.51
Parti Québécois	Normand Beauregard	3,852	16.26	–2.11
Québec solidaire	Guillaume Boivin	1,235	5.21	+0.27
Conservative	Sylvie Asselin	976	4.12	+3.29
Green	Alex Tyrrell	487	2.06	–
New Democratic	Denis Blanchette	319	1.35	–
Independent	Vincent Bégin	215	0.91	–
Option nationale	Martin St-Louis	61	0.26	–0.45
Équipe Autonomiste	Jean-Luc Rouckout	18	0.08	–
Total valid votes		23,687	99.20	
Total rejected ballots		190	0.80	
Turnout		23,877	52.43	
Electors on the lists		45,540	–	
Coalition Avenir Québec gain from Liberal		Swing		+27.82

Quebec provincial by-election, 2017
Party	Candidate	Votes	%	±%
Québec solidaire	Gabriel Nadeau-Dubois	9,872	69.30	+18.32
Liberal	Jonathan Marleau	1,269	8.91	–8.89
Option nationale	Vanessa Dion	1,116	7.83	+6.70
Coalition Avenir Québec	Benjamin Bélair	954	6.70	–1.97
Green	Alex Tyrrell	651	4.57	–
Bloc Pot	Jean-Patrick Berthiaume	113	0.79	–
Parti indépendantiste	Alexandre Cormier-Denis	81	0.57	–
Conservative	Samuel Fillion-Doiron	70	0.49	–
Parti des sans Parti	Nicole Goulet	34	0.24	–
Parti libre	Michel Leclerc	34	0.24	–
Independent	François-Xavier Richard-Choquette	24	0.17	–
Independent	Sébastien Théodore	15	0.11	–
Équipe Autonomiste	Louis Chandonnet	12	0.08	–
Total valid votes		14,245	98.32	–
Total rejected ballots		243	1.68	–
Turnout		14,488	32.79	–40.39
Electors on the lists		44,185	–	–
Québec solidaire hold		Swing		+13.55

Quebec provincial by-election, 11 April 2016
Party	Candidate	Votes	%	±%
Parti Québécois	Mireille Jean	8,810	46.69	+12.21
Liberal	Francyne Gobeil	5,700	30.21	+0.65
Coalition Avenir Québec	Hélène Girard	2,216	11.74	–5.71
Québec solidaire	Pierre Dostie	1,508	7.99	+1.54
Green	Alex Tyrrell	465	2.46	
Option nationale	Catherine Bouchard-Tremblay	170	0.90	–0.10
Total valid votes		18,869	98.43	
Total rejected ballots		301	1.57	–0.11
Turnout		19,170	41.11	–29.46
Electors on the lists		46,626	–	
Parti Québécois hold		Swing		+5.78

2014 Quebec general election
Party	Candidate	Votes	%	±%
Liberal	Kathleen Weil	22,336	76.61	+13.96
Québec solidaire	Annick Desjardins	2,164	7.42	–1.14
Coalition Avenir Québec	Noah Sidel	1,649	5.66	–7.96
Parti Québécois	Olivier Sirard	1,610	5.52	–2.77
Green	Alex Tyrrell	1,318	4.52	–1.20
Marxist–Leninist	Rachel Hoffman	78	0.27	–0.01
Total valid votes		29,155	99.35	–
Total rejected ballots		192	0.65	–
Turnout		29,347	72.50	+4.56
Electors on the lists		40,476	–	–

Quebec provincial by-election, 9 December 2013
Party	Candidate	Votes	%	±%
Liberal	Philippe Couillard	5,582	55.11	+13.59
Québec solidaire	Édith Laperle	3,264	32.23	+14.21
Option nationale	Julie Surprenant	677	6.68	+4.97
Green	Alex Tyrrell	384	3.79	–
Conservative	Pierre Ennio Crespi	145	1.43	–
Parti nul	Mathieu Marcil	59	0.58	–0.34
Autonomist Team	Guy Boivin	17	0.17	–
Total valid votes		10,128	99.13	–
Total rejected ballots		89	0.87	–
Turnout		10,217	26.42	–41.79
Electors on the lists		38,671	–	–
Liberal hold		Swing		–0.41

2012 Quebec general election
Party	Candidate	Votes	%	±%
Liberal	Geoffrey Kelley	24,525	73.11	–7.74
Coalition Avenir Québec	Paola L. Hawa	5,006	14.92	+11.09*
Green	Alex Tyrrell	1,522	4.54	–2.97
Parti Québécois	Olivier Gendreau	1,232	3.67	–2.35
Québec solidaire	François-Xavier Charlebois	859	2.56	+1.12
Independent	Francis Juneau	189	0.56	–
Option nationale	Raphaël Hébert	128	0.38	–
Quebec Citizens' Union	Ágnes Mina Barti	86	0.26	–
Total valid votes		33,547	99.47	–
Total rejected ballots		178	0.53	–
Turnout		33,725	76.89	+24.12
Electors on the lists		43,861	–	–
