= Reed Scowen =

Canadian politician (1931–2020)

MNA for Notre-Dame-de-Grâce
- In office 1978–1987
- Preceded by: Bryce Mackasey
- Succeeded by: Harold Thuringer

Personal details
- Born: June 13, 1931 Sherbrooke, Quebec
- Died: May 28, 2020 (aged 88) Toronto, Ontario, Canada
- Party: Liberal
- Profession: businessman

Philip Reed Scowen (June 13, 1931 – May 28, 2020) was a Canadian business executive, author and politician, living in Quebec.

Born in Sherbrooke, Quebec, Scowen graduated from Bishop's University in Quebec's Eastern Townships, and later took a degree in administration from Harvard University. In 1972 he attended the London School of Economics

For 18 years Scowen was president and general manager of the Canadian paper company, Perkins. He served on the boards of a number of public companies.

From 1974 to 1978 he worked for the Canadian federal government in Ottawa as executive director of the Price Control Program (AIB) and the Task Force on Canadian Unity.

Scowen was a member of the National Assembly of Quebec from 1978 to 1987, representing the electoral district of Notre-Dame-de-Grâce as a member of the Quebec Liberal Party. He later acted as an economic adviser to former premier Robert Bourassa, and as delegate general for Quebec in London, New York and Washington.

Scowen was actively involved in the issue of Quebec's place in Canada. He was chairman of anglophone civil rights group Alliance Quebec. He favored official bilingualism for the City of Montréal.

He was the author of two books on Canadian politics and was a regular columnist on business and economic matters for the Montreal Gazette.

In May 2011 Scowen was awarded the honorary degree - DCL Honoris causa - at Bishop's University for services to Quebec and the university

His son Peter Scowen has worked for CanWest Global's National Post newspaper and the Globe & Mail. Reed died in Toronto in May 2020 at the age of 88.

== Publications ==
- Réflexions sur l'avenir de la langue anglaise au Québec (1979)
- A Different Vision: the English in Quebec in the 1990s (1991)
- Le temps des adieux — Plaidoyer pour un Canada sans le Québec, V.l.B. (1999)
- Time to Say Goodbye: Building a Better Canada Without Quebec (second edition, 2007)
