= John Cyril Bennett =

British-born American architect

- Born: June 21, 1891; Hereford, England, U.K.
- Died: May 25, 1957; Los Angeles, California, U.S.
- Occupation: Architect
- Spouse: Olivia Cobb

John Cyril Bennett (June 21, 1891 – May 25, 1957) was a British-born American architect.

== Early life ==
Bennett was born in Hereford, England, and moved to Chicago, Illinois at three months of age.

From 1907 to 1910, he attended the University of California, Berkeley.

== Career ==
As an architech, Bennett designed several buildings in Pasadena, California, including the Pasadena Playhouse, the Pasadena Civic Auditorium, the Raymond Theatre in Pasadena, California, and the house at 1155 North Hill Avenue.

In 1954, President Dwight D. Eisenhower cited Cyril Bennett's role as head of the war bonds drive in Pasadena during World War II. Under Bennett's leadership, more war bonds were sold there than in any other American city of similar size.

== Personal life ==
On April 16, 1913, Bennett married Olivia Cobb, with whom he had two children: Robert and Margaret. In 1955, Bennett became a naturalized U.S. citizen.

Bennett died at his home in Pasadena, California on May 25, 1957. He was interred in the Pasadena Mausoleum.

== See also ==
- George Bergstrom
- Fitch Harrison Haskell
