= Catcon =

Catcon or CatCon may refer to:

- Catcon (company), Australian construction and civil engineering company
- CatCon (convention), annual convention and adoption event for cat enthusiasts
