= Désirée McGraw =

Canadian politician

Désirée McGraw MNA

Member of the National Assembly of Quebec for Notre-Dame-de-Grâce
- Incumbent
- Assumed office October 3, 2022
- Preceded by: Kathleen Weil

Personal details
- Party: Quebec Liberal Party

Désirée McGraw is a Canadian politician, who was elected to the National Assembly of Quebec in the 2022 Quebec general election. She represents the riding of Notre-Dame-de-Grâce as a member of the Quebec Liberal Party.

As of September 7, 2024, she serves as the opposition critic for Social Economy, Social Solidarity and Community Action, and Estrie.

In 2024, McGraw's private member's bill designating October 15 as a day of perinatal bereavement awareness passed with unanimous support from all parties in the National Assembly.

== Electoral record ==
2026 Quebec general election: Notre-Dame-de-Grâce
** Preliminary results — Not yet official **
Party	Candidate	Votes	%	±%
Liberal	Désirée McGraw	16,355	61.04	
Québec solidaire	Élise Davignon	4,761	17.77	
Conservative	Guillaume St-Pierre	2,126	7.93	
Parti Québécois	Vincent Hubert	1,586	5.92	
Coalition Avenir Québec	Kaan Altintas	767	2.86	
Green	Alex Tyrrell	679	2.53	
Canadian	Christian Turgeon	356	1.33	
Marxist–Leninist	Rachel Hoffman	103	0.38	
Communist	Ivan Byard	63	0.24	
Total valid votes				
Total rejected ballots				
Turnout			57.09	
Electors on the lists			–	–
Source: Élections Québec

2022 Quebec general election: Notre-Dame-de-Grâce
Party	Candidate	Votes	%	±%
Liberal	Désirée McGraw	12,918	50.46	-12.52
Québec solidaire	Élisabeth Labelle	3,967	15.49	+3.65
Conservative	Roy Eappen	2,087	8.15	+6.64
Coalition Avenir Québec	Geneviève Lemay	1,877	7.33	-0.68
Bloc Montreal	Balarama Holness	1,701	6.64	–
Parti Québécois	Cloé Rose Jenneau	1,302	5.09	-0.37
Green	Alex Tyrrell	956	3.73	-2.94
Canadian	Constantine Eliadis	723	2.82	–
Marxist–Leninist	Rachel Hoffman	71	0.28	-0.03
Total valid votes		25,602	98.72	–
Total rejected ballots		332	1.28	–
Turnout		25,934	55.76	-0.38
Electors on the lists		46,506	–	–
