= Raymond Barakett =

Canadian lawyer and arbitrator

Raymond Barakett was a Canadian lawyer and arbitrator.

Barakett graduated from McGill University with a BA (1955) and a BCL (1958). During his studies at the McGill Faculty of Law, he served as Editor-in-Chief of the McGill Law Journal. In the 1960s, Barakett served as Chairman of the Board for Canada Steamship Lines and as an active member of the Liberal Party of Canada. He attempted to become the Liberal nominee for Parliament in 1968, losing the position to William Tetley. In 1978, Barakett represented Warren Allmand in a scandal involved the Royal Canadian Mounted Police when he was the Federal Minister of Consumer and Corporate Affairs.

Barakett died in Lachine on September 7, 2019 at the age of 86.
