= Eric Maldoff =

Canadian lawyer and political advisor

Eric Maldoff is a Canadian lawyer and political advisor. He was a close advisor to former Prime Minister of Canada, Jean Chrétien, and a negotiator on behalf of the Government of Canada from 1995 to 2007, particularly regarding first nations land claims.

He obtained his common law and civil law degrees from McGill University, and was called to the Bar of Quebec in 1976. He is a partner at the Montreal law firm of Lapointe Rosenstein Marchand Melançon. He has also sat on the board of governors of McGill University since 2006. He is president of the Old Brewery Mission.

In 1982, he was a founder and became the first president of Alliance Quebec, the pro-anglophone Quebec lobby group.

In 2024, he made media statements as chair of the Coalition for Quality Health and Social Services.

== Honours ==
- 2001 - Order of Canada
- 2002 - Golden Jubilee Medal
- 2013 - Diamond Jubilee Medal
- 2013 - Lawyer Emeritus
