= Royal Orr =

Canadian former radio host

Royal Orr is a Canadian former radio host, best known as the host of CBC Radio's Cross Country Checkup from 1992 to 1994.

Originally a reporter for the network's bureau in Quebec City and an activist with the anglophone Quebecer lobby group Alliance Quebec, he became the organization's president in 1987. In 1988, he sued Le Journal de Montréal and Télé-Métropole for libel, when both organizations falsely reported that he was the "prime suspect" after the organization's offices were destroyed by arson. The lawsuit was eventually settled out of court.

He left Alliance Quebec in 1989 to become a host for Montreal commercial radio station CJAD, remaining with that station until joining public broadcaster CBC's Cross Country Checkup in 1992. He transitioned from Checkup in 1994 to become host of Daybreak, the local morning program on the network's Montreal station CBM. He left the show in 1996, attributing his decision to the fact that as a resident of Hatley, the job required him to either get up at 2:30 a.m. or stay in Montreal away from his family for most of the week.

He then became host of Spirit Connection, a documentary series about faith and spirituality produced by the United Church of Canada for VisionTV. At WorldFest-Houston in 2004, he won awards for two Spirit Connection documentaries, "All My Friends Just Fade" and "God's People, Among All God's People".

He received the Sheila and Victor Goldbloom Distinguished Community Service Award from the Quebec Community Groups Network in 2015.
