= Alliance Quebec =

Lobbyist group for anglophone Quebecers

Alliance Quebec (AQ) was a group formed in 1982 to lobby on behalf of English-speaking Quebecers in the province of Quebec, Canada. It began as an umbrella group of many English-speaking organizations and institutions in the province, with approximately 15,000 members. At its height in the mid-1980s, the group had a network of affiliated anglophone groups throughout the province. However, a prolonged decline in influence, group cohesion, membership and funding ultimately led to its closure in 2005.

== Early years — constructive engagement: 1982–1989 ==
The Parti Québécois (PQ), a party that supports the sovereignty of Quebec and the dominant use of French in most areas of public and business life, won a majority in the Quebec National Assembly (the province's legislature) in 1976. The vast majority of Quebec anglophones (i.e., Quebecers who speak English as a first language), who at that time made up approximately 13% of Quebec's population (see Language demographics of Quebec), did not support this party. Some anglophones formed local lobby groups to promote federalism and argue against new laws such as the Charter of the French Language (also known as "Bill 101"). After the Parti Québécois was re-elected in 1981, several of these groups (notably the "Positive Action Committee" and the "Council of Quebec Minorities") joined in May 1982, as "The Alliance of Language Communities in Quebec" (or "Alliance Québec") in an effort to gain more influence and to start a province-level dialogue between linguistic groups.

AQ's ideology reflected a desire to promote the rights and interests of the English language community while recognizing there were legitimate goals being pursued by the provincial government in promoting the French language, such promotion having strong support in the majority Francophone population. Alliance Quebec's best-known accomplishments from its earliest years included:

- Alliance Quebec's first success was to lobby the PQ to amend Bill 101. In 1983, the Charter of the French Language was amended (Law 57) to recognize in its preamble to the Charter of the French Language the institutions of the Anglophone community in Québec, abolish language testing for people educated in Quebec, and to widen the use of English in Anglophone communities and public institutions.
- Alliance Quebec also worked to get English language health and social service guarantees. As a result, in 1986, Law 142 was enacted which compels regional authorities to draw up programmes for access in the English language to health and social services throughout Quebec.
- With the financial support and legal leadership of Alliance Quebec, Bill 101's prohibition of English language signs was challenged in court. In 1988, in its decision Ford v. Quebec (Attorney General), the Supreme Court of Canada concluded that the prohibition of all other languages but French on public signs and posters and in commercial advertising was in opposition to the freedom of expression but opened the door to the clear predominance of French. This solution was ultimately adopted by the Government of Quebec and prevails to this day.

The group had widespread grassroots volunteer activity in its early years. It formed at least 20 regional chapters, including 8 in the anglophone neighbourhoods of Montreal. The federal government subsidized AQ in an effort to promote minority official language groups in the province, providing it with most of AQ's budget ($1.4 million in 1986). Similar funding was provided to French language groups outside Quebec.

In addition to AQ's regional chapters, six federally funded anglophone groups outside of Montreal became affiliated with AQ and sent delegates to its annual convention. Affiliated Quebec anglophone universities, CEGEPs and health and social service institution and community associations were also allowed to send delegates. Institutional members brought AQ substantial public policy expertise and participated in the policy formulation process.

By the end of the 1980s, AQ claimed to have 40,000 people on its membership list (including members of regional associations affiliated with AQ, such as the Townshippers' Association). This led to critiques that people who did not renew their memberships were not removed from this list and that the actual number of dues-paying members hovered around 5,000.

Many of Alliance Quebec's founders were active in the Liberal Party of Quebec, the main opposition party while the PQ was in government. The Liberal Party of Quebec won the provincial election of 1985, and many of AQ's initial leaders were recruited to work for the new government. Several of AQ's highly educated and bilingual early staff members went on to become Liberal cabinet ministers in later years, such as Thomas Mulcair, Kathleen Weil, and Geoffrey Kelley (Jacques-Cartier), while others served as MNAs—Russell Williams (Nelligan), Russell Copeman (NDG). While this initially gave AQ strong lobbying contacts within the government, the departure of many of the group's founding leaders eventually hurt the group. Some have argued that the 1985 election was the beginning of a decline in influence of Alliance Quebec, as English-speakers believed the new government was friendlier and so the need for AQ was lower, while the Liberals had more connections with English-speakers than the PQ and so relied less on AQ to transmit their points of view. The group also faced criticism, almost since its founding, that it was not aggressive enough in its demands.

In December 1988, AQ's offices were destroyed in a case of arson. Then-president Royal Orr sued Le Journal de Montréal and Télé-Métropole, for falsely reporting that he was the "prime suspect" in setting the blaze. The lawsuit was eventually settled out of court.

== Middle years — stagnation and infighting: 1989–1998 ==
AQ's weakened bargaining position was brought to prominence in 1989 when the Liberal government passed Bill 178. Although the Liberal Party had campaigned in 1985 to loosen the legal restrictions on languages other than French, Bill 178 overturned the Supreme Court's "Ford" decision (see above), restoring the prohibition on non-French commercial signage (with an exception for small signs inside stores). Alliance Quebec's inability to prevent the adoption of Bill 178 by the Liberal government it had perceived as an ally, opened it to criticism from the anglophone community. Right-wing critics of AQ dubbed it "Compliance Quebec" and "the lamb lobby" for its perceived unwillingness to challenge the government.

Internal tension arose among the directors of AQ over the issue of denied access to English language schools in the province. Tensions increased over whether or not to support the Liberals in the Quebec general election of 1989 in spite of Bill 178. Some prominent AQ leaders urged a protest vote by anglophones, either by spoiling their ballots or voting for the upstart Equality Party that opposed the Liberals' legislation. The Equality Party won four seats in the National Assembly in 1989, but quickly lost its support due to infighting, garnering only 0.3% of the vote in 1994. Rebuffed at the ballot box, some of the Equality Party's remaining active members instead concentrated on winning elected positions in Alliance Quebec in order to have AQ promote the Equality Party's platform (notably, favouring a complete repeal of all mandatory use of French in Quebec, and partitioning Quebec in the event of independence). Public infighting between so-called "moderates" (sympathetic to the Liberal Party) and "radicals" (the remaining members of the Equality Party) within AQ throughout the 1990s, along with a gradual decrease in interest among the general Quebec population in language politics, led to the marginalization of AQ in the province's politics.

While infighting preoccupied the board of directors and annual convention, the grassroots elements of AQ became less active. Government funding allowed for a permanent staff for the group, which relied less and less on volunteers. AQ's smallest regional chapters, in Quebec's Magdalen Islands, Lower North Shore and Baie-Comeau, closed down for lack of members, while six of the group's eight chapters on the Island of Montreal merged in order to avoid closing.

In 1996, the Chief Electoral Officer of Quebec investigated alleged irregularities during the 1995 Quebec sovereignty referendum, finding among other things that votes in three mainly federalist ridings had been rejected without valid reasons. Alliance Quebec sued the Quebec government to try to force it to re-examine the rejected ballots in all 125 Quebec ridings. The trial judge ruled against AQ in 2000. AQ appealed, but ceased operations in 2005 (see below). In 2008 the Chief Electoral Officer got the court's permission to destroy the ballots after ruling that AQ's appeal had taken too long.

== Final years — radicalization and closure: 1998–2005 ==
In May 1998, the group elected a "radical" president, Montreal Gazette columnist William Johnson. Previously a vocal critic of AQ, he won by rallying a group known derisively as "angryphones" (mainly members of the tiny Equality Party and some listeners of right wing talk radio shows, particularly the Howard Galganov show). He in turn supported Equality Party members for positions on AQ's board of directors. Unlike previous presidents, he made no attempt to meet with political leaders, preferring to conduct his lobbying through media, such as on radio talk shows. Also unlike previous presidents, who generally accepted the objectives of Bill 101 and focused on changing how it was applied, Johnson questioned the commitment to tolerance and human rights of those who supported Bill 101.

After his election, Johnson organized two demonstrations against stores, in particular Eaton's and The Hudson's Bay Company, that did not place English on their in-store advertising (which was once again legal after amendments to the Charter of the French Language in 1994). Johnson told a crowd of demonstrators that he refused an Eaton's offer to put up English signs in their stores if AQ would quietly call off the protest, as Johnson wanted to make it a public issue. Johnson also had AQ's constitution amended to add his view that Canada's federal government should refuse to recognize a Quebec unilateral declaration of independence. Johnson also made headlines when the Entartistes threw a cream pie in his face while he marched in Montreal's 1998 Saint-Jean-Baptiste Day parade.

Johnson's presidential campaign and his first six months as president temporarily brought more media attention and members to Alliance Quebec, as the PQ government and Quebec nationalist groups publicly criticized AQ's new, more confrontational tone. However, Johnson called off the group's protests in October 1998 and AQ's media coverage fell considerably, never to recover. Johnson's presidency and those of his similarly minded successors also provoked a negative reaction from the mainstream community of anglophones that formerly supported AQ. Links to the community's key healthcare, educational and community institutions vanished. Several events during these years highlighted the group's lack of support, which ultimately caused it to close down:

- half of the group's board of directors (those not associated with the Equality Party) quit the group en masse in May 1999, calling Johnson "a bully and a publicity hound";
- in a study published in 2000, only 16% of Quebec anglophones named Alliance Quebec as the group that best protected their interests;
- the number of members of AQ declined steadily (4,198 members in May 1998; 2,440 members in August 2001; 1,554 members in December 2003);
- Chapters and affiliated groups severed their ties, including some that removed the word "Alliance" from their names to avoid being associated with AQ;
- the severity of infighting among remaining members increased, sometimes requiring intervention by the courts;
- private donations ($250,000 in the mid-1990s) dropped over 90% from 1998 to 2003, with corporate donations stopping completely;
- the federal government, its main sponsor (providing over 90% of AQ's annual budget), decreased funding to the group by 69% between 2000 and 2004. The first funding decrease (from $934,000 to $634,000 annually) came in 2001 after twenty anglophone groups ended their affiliation with Alliance Quebec and asked for separate government funding through the newly formed Quebec Community Groups Network. A second series of funding cuts (to $200,000 annually) came in 2003-2004 after federal government dissatisfaction with AQ's lack of spending controls and a drop in its membership and influence. When the Department of Canadian Heritage finally discontinued its grant in 2005 after AQ failed to produce audited financial statements, the group became insolvent and ceased activity.

== Structure ==
Alliance Quebec was registered as a non-profit association in Quebec, with a headquarters in Montreal. Anyone could join as a member by paying a nominal fee of $5–$10. Membership entitled them to participate in the regional chapter in which they lived. Each regional chapter had its own board of directors and executive and obtained their budget mainly from membership fees.

Each chapter could send nine delegates to the annual convention, which took place each May in Montreal. In the 1990s, six chapters in central Montreal merged, which allowed the merged chapter to send up to 54 delegates. (In the William Johnson era, the West Island chapter's number of delegates was increased to reflect that it was the chapter with the second-largest number of members.) A youth commission of members under thirty years of age also existed and could send up to 18 delegates to the convention. Affiliated groups such as the Townshippers' Association could also send delegates, as could affiliated universities, hospitals and community groups. The outgoing president and board of directors were also entitled to vote at the convention, representing 41 delegates. In theory, an annual convention could have nearly 400 delegates during the 1990s. In practice, the number of delegates attending annual conventions decreased over time as membership fell and affiliated groups stopped participating; the annual convention in 1985 had about 470 delegates while each of the conventions from 1999 onward had under 100 delegates.

The annual convention chose the president and treasurer of AQ for the upcoming year. (In the William Johnson era, the president's term was lengthened to two years, although each subsequent president resigned before the end of their full two-year term.) The delegates would also choose the board of directors. Half of the forty-person board of directors of AQ would be up for election annually for a two-year term; the top twenty candidates who received the most votes being elected. The new board of directors would meet immediately after the convention to choose the remaining executive positions, including vice president, vice president "off-island" (meaning from outside of Montreal), secretary, and chairman of the board. The group also had an "Advisory Council" of prominent anglophones to advise the group on important issues from time to time, but this fell into disuse by the late 1990s.

The executives and directors were volunteer positions (although the president received a stipend). There were also a number of paid staff members (around two dozen in 1994), such as a general director, a fundraiser, receptionists, researchers and organizers, paid for mainly from federal government grants.

For most of its existence, AQ also maintained committees to study issues. These included (at various times)committees for health and social services, education, access to English schools, youth employment, legal affairs, communication, internal rules, and membership. Some committees organized events and activities. One of these activities, "Youth Employment Services", became independent of AQ in the 1990s and continues to operate. Larger chapters also had some committees, especially in the group's early years.

== Presidents ==
- Eric Maldoff (1982–1985), lawyer
- Michael Goldbloom (1985–1987), lawyer
- Royal Orr (1987–1989), teacher
- Peter M. Blaikie, Q.C.(1989), lawyer
- Robert Keaton (1989–1993), political science professor
- Michael Hamelin (1993–1997), lawyer, Immigration and Refugee Board member
- Constance Middleton-Hope (1997–1998), educator
- William Johnson (1998–2000) journalist, author
- Anthony Housefather (2000–2001), lawyer, municipal politician
- Brent Tyler (2001–2004), lawyer
- Darryl Gray (2004–2005), member of the clergy
