= Eric Kierans =

Canadian politician

The Honourable Eric Kierans PC OC
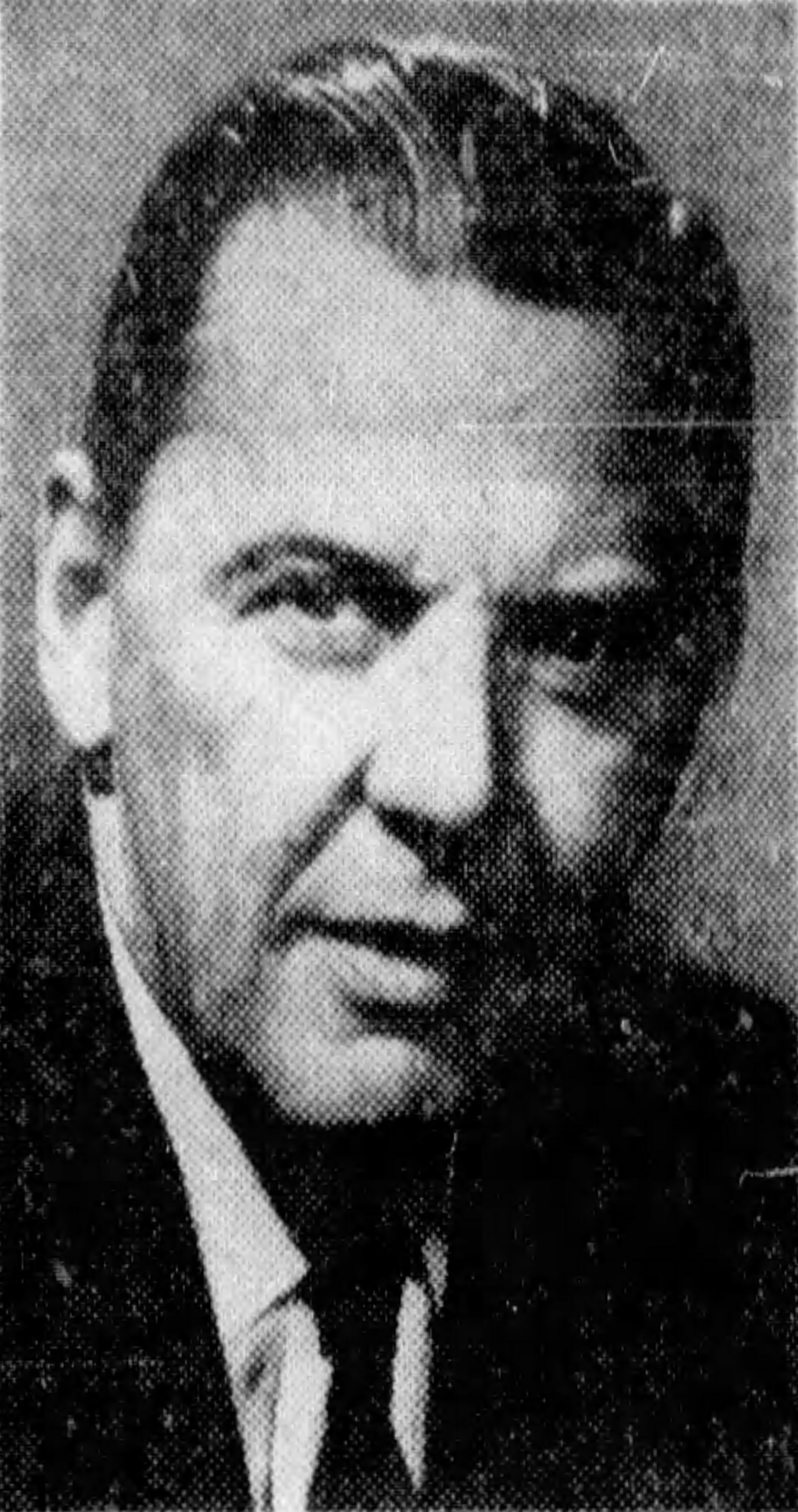
- Kierans, 1966

Minister of Communications
- In office 1 April 1969 – 28 April 1971
- Prime Minister: Pierre Trudeau
- Preceded by: Office established
- Succeeded by: Jean-Pierre Côté (acting)

Postmaster General of Canada
- In office 6 July 1968 – 31 March 1969
- Prime Minister: Pierre Trudeau
- Preceded by: Jean-Pierre Côté
- Succeeded by: Jean-Pierre Côté

Member of Parliament for Duvernay
- In office 25 June 1968 – 29 October 1972
- Preceded by: Riding created
- Succeeded by: Yves Demers

Member of the National Assembly of Quebec for Notre-Dame-de-Grâce Montréal–Notre-Dame-de-Grâce (1963–1966)
- In office 25 September 1963 – 31 May 1968
- Preceded by: Paul Earl
- Succeeded by: William Tetley

Personal details
- Born: Eric William Kierans; 2 February 1914 Montreal, Quebec, Canada
- Died: 10 May 2004 (aged 90) Montreal, Quebec, Canada
- Party: Liberal
- Other political affiliations: New Democratic
- Spouse: Teresa Whelan (m. 1938; died 2003)
- Children: 2
- Education: Loyola College (BA); McGill University
- Occupation: Professor; Economist

Eric William Kierans PC OC (2 February 1914 – 10 May 2004) was a Canadian economist and politician.

== Early life ==
Eric Kierans was born on 2 February 1914, in Montreal to Irish immigrant parents. He grew up in a working-class neighborhood and attended Loyola College, where he earned a bachelor's degree in commerce.

After graduation, Kierans worked for several years in the family fur and leather business before leaving to pursue a career in politics. He joined the Liberal Party of Canada and was elected to the House of Commons in 1962, representing the riding of Saint-Laurent.

During his early life, Kierans was a passionate supporter of the cooperative movement and believed in the power of community organizing. He was also committed to social justice issues and worked to improve the lives of working-class Canadians.

He died on 10 May 2004, at the age of 90.

== Career ==
After serving as director of the school of commerce at McGill University and president of the Montreal Stock Exchange, Kierans entered provincial politics in 1963. Nicknamed the "Socialist Millionaire," he was appointed Minister of Revenue and then Minister of Health in the Quebec Liberal government of Quebec Premier Jean Lesage during the Quiet Revolution.

Kierans became president of the Quebec Liberal Party and clashed with former cabinet minister and colleague René Lévesque in 1967, daring him to give up the idea of Quebec separatism or quit the Liberal Party. Lévesque later quit the Liberal Party and established the Mouvement Souveraineté-Association, which became Quebec's leading sovereigntist party as the Parti Québécois.

Initially a critic of Walter L. Gordon's economic nationalism, Kierans' experience in government changed his mind, and he became a believer in the need for state intervention in the economy.

In 1968, Kierans entered federal politics running unsuccessfully for the leadership of the Liberal Party of Canada at its 1968 leadership convention. He was elected to the House of Commons in the 1968 federal election. Kierans served as Postmaster-General and Minister of Communications in the cabinet of Prime Minister Pierre Trudeau. He did not run for re-election in the 1972 election, partly as a result of his criticisms of Trudeau's economic policy.

Kierans called for Canada to leave the North Atlantic Treaty Organization (NATO) in 1969. He argued that the organization might have served a useful purpose on its initial formation but had since become anachronistic. Some others with the Trudeau government agreed with Kierans, but others strongly disagreed. The Trudeau government ultimately kept Canada in NATO but reduced Canada's troop deployment.

He considered running for the leadership of the New Democratic Party in 1975 but declined in favour of Ed Broadbent.

After leaving politics, Kierans taught at McGill and Dalhousie University. In the 1980s, he became a familiar voice appearing with Dalton Camp and Stephen Lewis as part of a weekly political panel on Peter Gzowski's Canadian Broadcasting Corporation radio show, Morningside.

In 1994, he was made an Officer of the Order of Canada.

== Archives ==
There is an Eric William Kierans fonds at Library and Archives Canada.
