= 2013 Green Party of Quebec leadership election =

- September 21, 2013
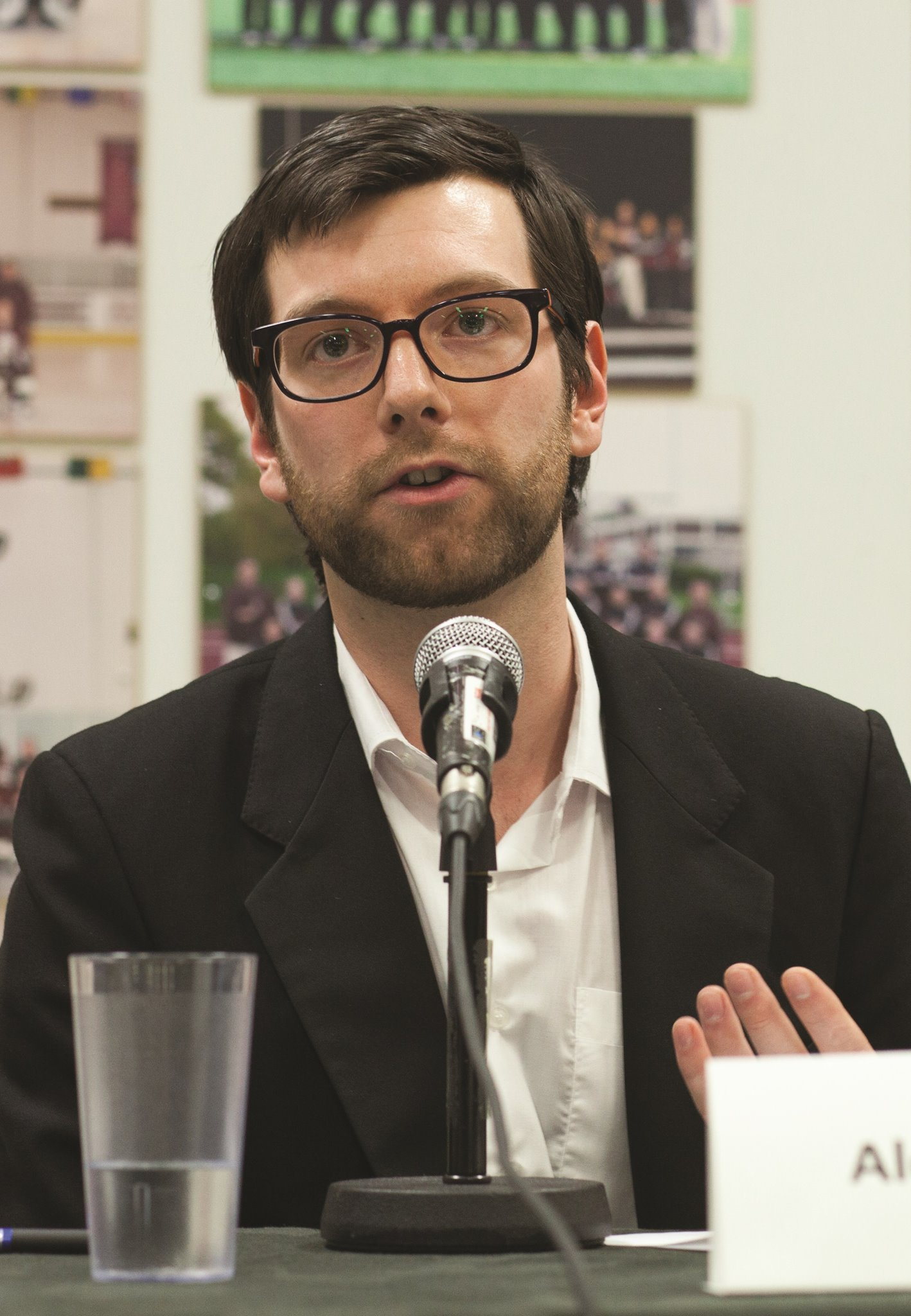
		PD	MB
Candidate	Alex Tyrrell	Patricia Domingos	Marc-André Beauchemin
Result	Winner	-	-
	PEL
Candidate	Pierre Étienne Loignon
Result	-
Leader before election
Claude Sabourin
Elected Leader
Alex Tyrrell

2013 Green Party of Quebec leadership election
- Date: September 21, 2013
- Convention: Quebec City, Quebec
- Resigning leader: Claude Sabourin
- Won by: Alex Tyrrell
- Ballots: 1
- Candidates: 4

The 2013 Green Party of Quebec leadership election took place September 21, 2013 in Quebec City, Quebec

Following the party's sagging fortunes in the 2012 campaign, including a public incident in which a journalist with the newspaper La Presse was able to secure candidacy with the party without vetting, incumbent Green Party leader Claude Sabourin resigned.

== Registered candidates ==
- Alex Tyrrell, candidate for Jacques-Cartier in the 2012 Quebec general election.
- Patricia Domingos, mayor of Sainte-Justine-de-Newton.
- Marc-André Beauchemin, candidate for the Action démocratique du Québec in La Pinière in the 2007 and 2008 Quebec general elections.
- Pierre Étienne Loignon, party activist.

== Potential candidates who did not enter ==
- Paul-André Martineau, 2010 candidate for leader.
