= Pasadena Playhouse =

Theater in California, U.S.

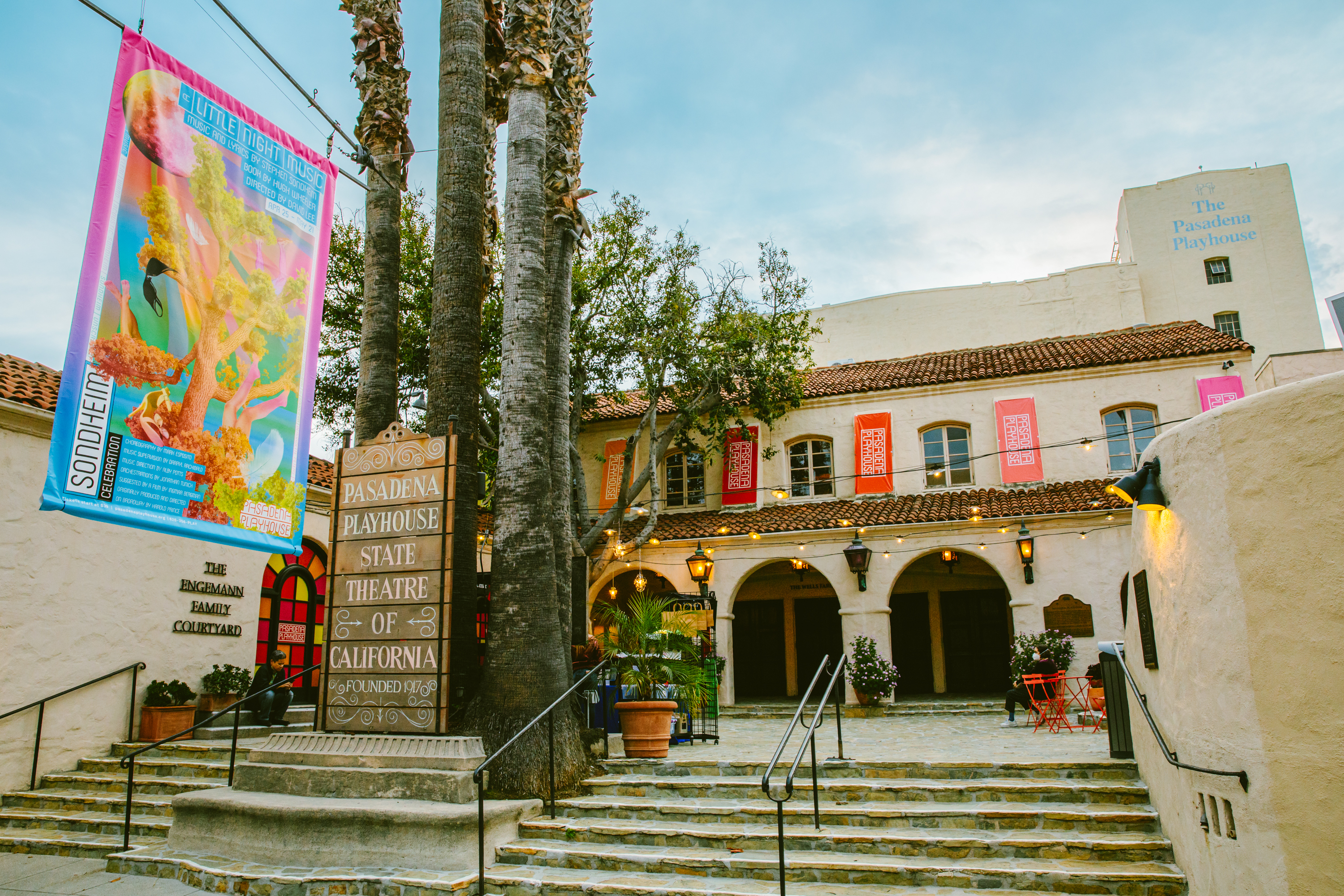
- Interactive map of Pasadena Playhouse
- Address: 39 South El Molino Avenue; Pasadena, California; United States
- Coordinates: 34°08′42.5″N 118°08′15″W
- Owner: Pasadena Playhouse State Theatre of California, Inc.
- Capacity: 686
- Type: Regional theatre
- Public transit: Memorial Park

Construction
- Opened: 1924
- Reopened: 1986

Website
- pasadenaplayhouse.org
- Pasadena Playhouse
- U.S. National Register of Historic Places
- California Historical Landmark No. 887
- Architect: Elmer Grey; A. Dwight Gibbs; Cyril Bennett
- Architectural style: Spanish Colonial Revival
- NRHP reference No.: 75000435
- CHISL No.: 887
- Added to NRHP: November 11, 1975

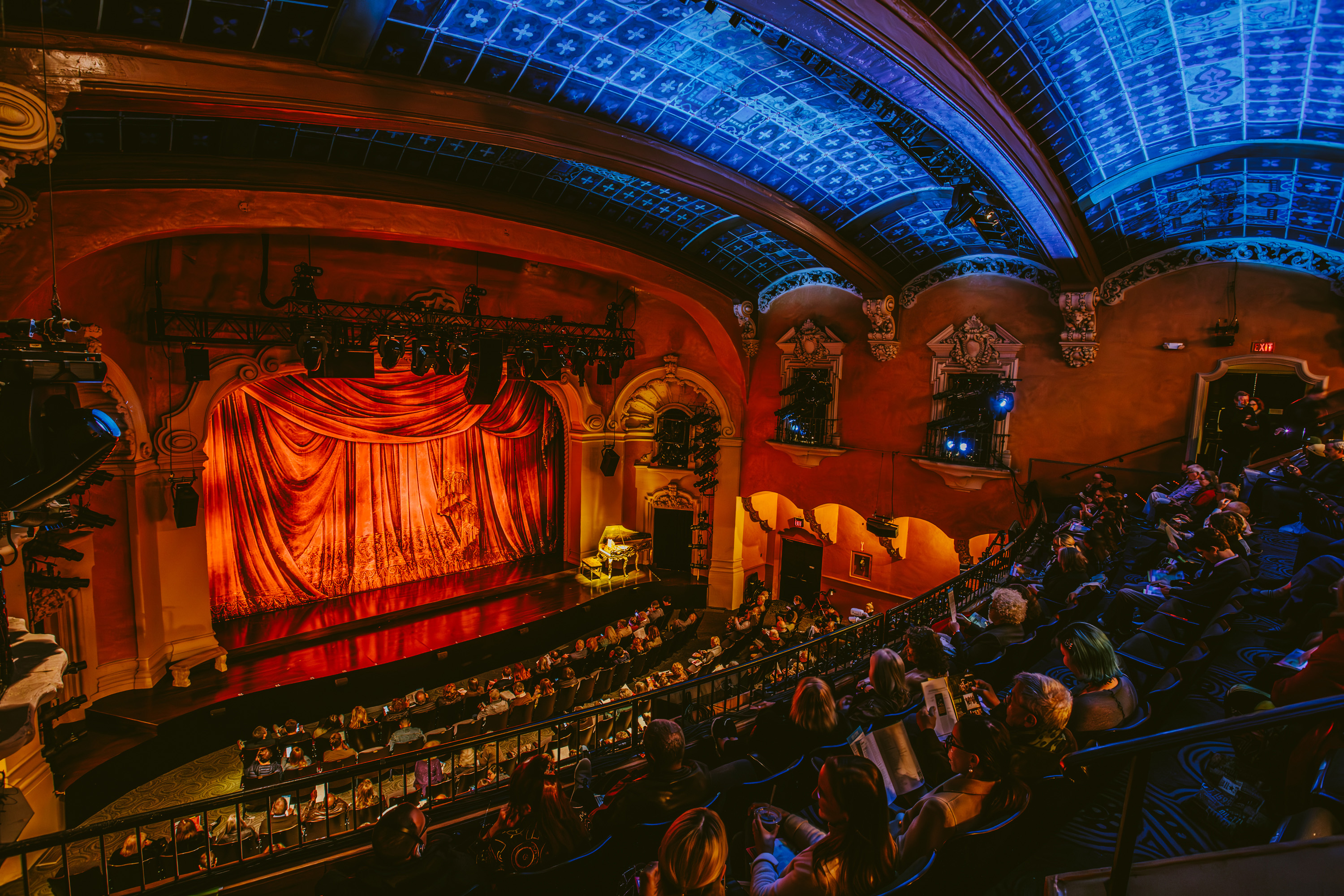
Interior of Pasadena Playhouse, as seen from the mezzanine

Pasadena Playhouse is a performing arts venue located at 39 S. El Molino Avenue in Pasadena, California. The 686-seat auditorium produces a variety of cultural and artistic events, professional shows, and community engagements each year.

== History ==
Beginning around 1912, the period known as the Little Theatre Movement developed in cities and towns across the United States. The artistic community that founded the Pasadena Playhouse was started in 1916 when actor-director Gilmor Brown began producing a series of plays at a renovated burlesque theatre with his troupe "The Gilmor Brown Players". Brown established the Community Playhouse Association of Pasadena in 1917 that would later become the Pasadena Playhouse Association, which necessitated a new venue for productions.

The community theatre organization quickly grew and in May 1924, the citizens of Pasadena raised funds to build a new theatre in the city center at 39 South El Molino Avenue. Completed in 1925, the theatre was designed in a Spanish Colonial Revival style by Pasadena artist and architect Elmer Grey, with a fire curtain painted by Pasadena artist Alson S. Clark.

Its non-professional, community beginnings and the tremendous amount of local support for the project led George Bernard Shaw to dub Pasadena "the Athens of the West", likening the enterprise to the ancient Festival Dionysia.

The building that was designed by Grey and built by the Winter Construction Co. drew the attention of the nation, bringing Southern California world premieres by authors such as Eugene O'Neill, William Saroyan, Noël Coward, F. Scott Fitzgerald and Tennessee Williams, as well as many English language premieres of significant European dramas. The Playhouse was recognized by the Legislature as the State Theatre of California in 1937.

The Pasadena Playhouse School of Theatre Arts was established in 1927 initially offering course credit via the University of California. Later known as the Pasadena Playhouse College of Theatre Arts, it eventually became an accredited college in 1936, offering BFA and MFA degrees. The college trained notable talents such as Raymond Burr, Victor Mature, Ernest Borgnine, Eleanor Parker, Charles Bronson, Ray Vasquez, Gene Hackman, Dustin Hoffman, Sally Struthers, Jamie Farr, Mako, Robert Rockwell, and others. During the school years, the Playhouse was very active, having as many as five independent stages in operation at any given time, giving 306–322 performances annually on the main stage alone. In order to provide housing for the many students, older homes along El Molino Avenue were modified to become dormitories.

The varied staging capabilities offered by its five venues led the Playhouse to become one of the first companies in California to experiment with new theatrical forms such as theatre-in-the-round. The Playhouse also built and operated one of the first television stations in Southern California. In addition to training the Air Force to use television and radio equipment, the Pasadena Playhouse supplied the majority of Southern California's early TV stations with the first trained technicians in the business.

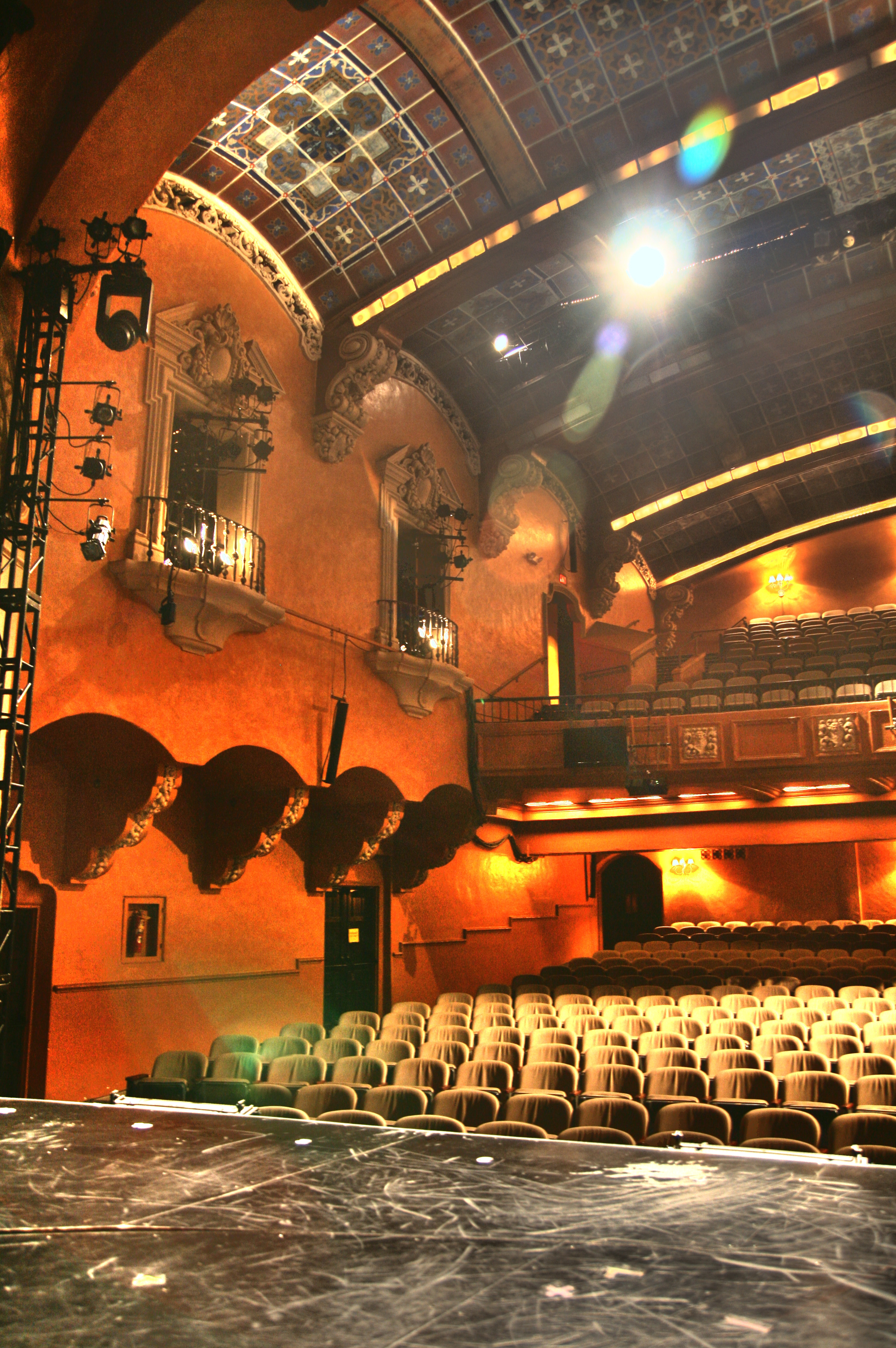
A partial view of the theater auditorium

Due to changes in Actors' Equity Association laws, and the opening of drama departments in many schools and universities across the country, the College of Theatre Arts shut down in 1969. Later that year, after the death of founding director Gilmor Brown, the theatre itself went bankrupt. After six years, the city bought the building in 1975 and later transferred it to real estate developer David Houk. After it lay dormant for 17 years, he relaunched the theatre in 1986 as a place to develop shows that would tour other California venues. While the Pasadena Playhouse reopened for use as a community theatre, the acting school remained closed. Over the next twenty years, the theatre staged classic drama, new musicals and plays, and integrated itself as an educational facility, slowly regaining a prominent place in the national theatre scene to become a major operation of over eight million dollars a year by 2008.

== 2010–2011 financial situation ==
Regardless of continued recent critical acclaim of the Playhouse, and despite its steadily popular and ambitious season schedules, the theatre had a history of financial difficulties since its reopening in the 1980s. Saddled with millions of dollars' worth of debt from earlier unforeseen expenditures during the theatre's restoration, the Playhouse's operators struggled with balancing interest and loan repayments with increasing running costs.

On January 29, 2010, the Los Angeles Times announced that, due to financial difficulties, the theatre would close on February 7 after its run of the musical Camelot and cancel the remaining 2010 season. On May 11, 2010, the Pasadena Playhouse filed for Chapter 11 bankruptcy protection and announced an intention to restructure its operations to reduce its debt burden.

After less than four months, on July 7, 2010, it emerged from bankruptcy after a multimillion-dollar anonymous matching fund contribution toward operating costs and judicially approved debt cancellation. The Pasadena Playhouse also reduced paid staff to essential upper level administration, keeping the Artistic Director Sheldon Epps as coordinator for the rest of the planned consolidation. Director Epps announced through an interview with the LA Times that the shake-up was intended to put the theatre back on solid financial footing and ensure the Playhouse's survival into the future. The Playhouse released a tentative Fall/Winter season schedule including one new production of Dangerous Beauty slated for January 2011. Plans for a new extension and 400 seat venue designed pro bono by Frank Gehry were announced in 2007, but the extension was never built.

A majority of the subscribers donated the rest of their season back to the theatre rather than requesting refunds, recusing the theatre of over a million dollars in possible financial liability. Epps has said that as the debt burden is lifted these steps will allow the theatre to carefully and responsibly rebuild the company.

On April 1, 2011, the Playhouse held a "Premiere Gala: Opening Night" to celebrate its newfound financial solvency and announce next year's productions.

== The next century ==
In 2017, after 20 years as artistic director, Sheldon Epps announced his departure from the theater. Epps produced over 100 plays during his tenure and personally directed 13 of them. Danny Feldman, the executive director at Labyrinth Theater Company in New York was chosen as his replacement.

Pasadena Playhouse received the 2023 Regional Theatre Tony Award at the 76th Tony Awards.

== Awards and nominations ==
Awards	Production	Nominations	Wins	Notes
2009 Ovation Awards	Stormy Weather	3	0	
2011 Ovation Awards	Twist – An American Musical	5	2	Won for Scenic Design and Costume Design
2012 Ovation Awards	The Heiress	2	0	
2013 Ovation Awards	Fallen Angels (play)	5	0	
76th Tony Awards	Regional Theatre Tony Award	N/A	N/A	

== Notable alumni and players ==
- Jane Adams
- Martha Allan
- Louise Allbritton
- John Alvin
- Gordon Anderson
- Dana Andrews
- Morris Ankrum
- Eve Arden
- Jean Arthur
- Ed Asner
- Gordon Atkinson
- Claudia Barrett
- Angela Bassett
- Florence Bates
- Ernest Borgnine
- Wayne Brady
- Henry Brandon
- Charles Bronson
- Joshua Bryant
- Max Showalter
- Edgar Buchanan
- Raymond Burr
- Ruth Buzzi
- Richard Carlson
- Youssef Chahine
- Jack T. Chick
- Lee J. Cobb
- Maxine Cooper Gomberg
- John Conte
- Laird Cregar
- Donald Curtis
- Merle Dandridge
- Helmut Dantine
- Henry Darrow
- Herschel Daugherty
- Frances Dee
- Don DeFore
- Agnes De Mille
- Bill Erwin
- Gene Evans
- Jamie Farr
- Yvonne Lime Fedderson (as Yvonne Lime)
- Frank Ferguson
- Horton Foote
- Martha Graham
- Ariana Grande
- Dabbs Greer
- Gene Hackman
- William Henry
- Peter Hansen
- Neil Patrick Harris
- Samuel S. Hinds
- Max Hodge
- Dustin Hoffman
- William Holden
- Earl Holliman
- Kim Hunter
- Martha Hyer
- Carolyn Jones
- Victor Jory
- Werner Klemperer
- John Meredyth Lucas
- Helen Mack
- Mako
- John Mantley
- Hugh Marlowe
- Kerwin Mathews
- Victor Mature
- Marilyn Maxwell
- Rue McClanahan
- Joel McCrea
- Eve McVeagh
- Joyce Meadows
- Ruth Mix
- Douglass Montgomery
- Mickey Moore
- Wayne Morris
- Ben Murphy
- George Nader
- John M. Nickolaus, Jr.
- Leonard Nimoy
- David Niven
- Lloyd Nolan
- Nick Nolte
- Moroni Olsen
- Al Pacino (2017)
- Eleanor Parker
- Tyrone Power
- Robert Preston
- George Reeves (as George Bessolo)
- Robert Ridgely
- John Ritter
- Robert Rockwell
- Barbara Rush
- Ben Savage
- Joe Sawyer (as Joseph Sauers)
- Randolph Scott
- Ralph Senensky
- Maria Solveg
- Paul Sorensen
- Harry Dean Stanton
- Edward Stephenson
- Julie Stevens
- Onslow Stevens
- Sally Struthers
- Gloria Stuart
- Robert Taylor
- Toni Trucks
- Daniel Truhitte
- Catherine Turney
- Joan Valerie
- Ray Vasquez
- James Westerfield
- Joan Wheeler
- Frank Wilcox
- Jo Anne Worley
- Maris Wrixon
- Meg Wyllie
- David Young
- Gig Young (as Byron Barr)
- Robert Young
- Paul Zastupnevich
