= Kathleen Weil =

Canadian politician and lawyer

The Honourable Kathleen Weil
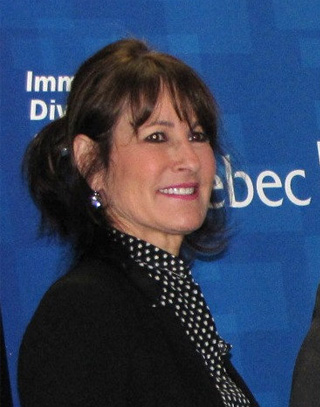

Member of the National Assembly of Quebec for Notre-Dame-de-Grâce
- In office December 8, 2008 – August 28, 2022
- Preceded by: Russell Copeman
- Succeeded by: Désirée McGraw

Minister responsible for Relations with English-Speaking Quebecers
- In office October 11, 2017 – October 18, 2018
- Preceded by: Position created
- Succeeded by: François Legault

Quebec Minister of Immigration, Diversity and Inclusiveness
- In office April 23, 2014 – October 11, 2017
- Preceded by: Diane De Courcy
- Succeeded by: David Heurtel

Quebec Minister of Immigration and Cultural Communities
- In office August 11, 2010 – September 19, 2012
- Preceded by: Yolande James
- Succeeded by: Diane De Courcy

Quebec Minister of Justice
- In office December 18, 2008 – August 11, 2010
- Preceded by: Jacques Dupuis
- Succeeded by: Jean-Marc Fournier

Personal details
- Born: 1954 (age 71–72)
- Party: Quebec Liberal Party
- Spouse: Michael Novak
- Profession: Lawyer

Kathleen Weil is a Canadian politician and lawyer. Weil was elected to represent the riding of Notre-Dame-de-Grâce in the National Assembly of Quebec in the 2008 provincial election. She is a member of the Quebec Liberal Party and a former provincial cabinet minister.

Weil studied at McGill University and received a bachelor's degree in history and political sciences in 1978 and a degree in civil and common law in 1982 before being admitted to the Bar of Quebec in 1983. She served as an official with Alliance Quebec.

In addition to her law practice, she was heavily involved from 2000 in the health and social services sector, being an administrative member for the Montreal Children's Hospital and the Régie régionale des services de la santé et des services sociaux à Montréal. Before entering politics, she was President CEO of the Foundation of Greater Montreal.

She was appointed to the Executive Council of Quebec on December 18, 2008, as Minister of Justice and Attorney General.

In 2010, Weil was appointed as Minister of Immigration and Cultural Communities. In the 2012 election the Liberals lost power to the Parti Quebecois and Weil returned to the opposition benches as Official Opposition critic for employment and the social economy. Following the 2014 provincial election the Liberals returned to power, and she was appointed Minister of Immigration, Diversity and Inclusiveness.

On 11 October 2017, Weil was sworn in as the first Ministre responsable des Relations avec les Québécois de langue anglaise.

She was re-elected for a fourth time as a member of the Quebec National Assembly in the 2018 Quebec general election. The Liberals lost the election and returned as the official opposition to a new CAQ government. On June 6, 2022, Weil announced she would not be seeking re-election in the 2022 election and bowing out of politics after 14 years.

Weil is married to Michael Novak, ex-president of AtkinsRéalis International.

== Electoral record ==
2018 Quebec general election: Notre-Dame-de-Grâce
| Party | Candidate | Votes | % | ±% |
|---|---|---|---|---|
| Liberal | Kathleen Weil | 16,843 | 62.98 | -13.63 |
| Québec solidaire | Kathleen Gudmundsson | 3,166 | 11.84 | +4.42 |
| Coalition Avenir Québec | Nathalie Dansereau | 2,142 | 8.01 | +2.35 |
| Green | Chad Walcott | 1,785 | 6.67 | +2.15 |
| Parti Québécois | Lucie Bélanger | 1,460 | 5.46 | -0.06 |
| New Democratic | David-Roger Gagnon | 708 | 2.65 | |
| Conservative | Souhail Ftouh | 405 | 1.51 | |
| Independent | Cynthia Nichols | 151 | 0.56 | |
| Marxist–Leninist | Rachel Hoffman | 82 | 0.31 | +0.04 |
| Total valid votes | | 26,742 | 99.08 | |
| Total rejected ballots | | 249 | 0.92 | |
| Turnout | | 26,991 | 56.14 | |
| Eligible voters | | 48,076 | | |
| Liberal hold | | Swing | | -9.025 |
Source(s) "Rapport des résultats officiels du scrutin". Élections Québec.

2014 Quebec general election
| Party | Candidate | Votes | % | ±% |
|---|---|---|---|---|
| Liberal | Kathleen Weil | 22,336 | 76.61 | +13.96 |
| Québec solidaire | Annick Desjardins | 2,164 | 7.42 | -1.14 |
| Coalition Avenir Québec | Noah Sidel | 1,649 | 5.66 | -7.96 |
| Parti Québécois | Olivier Sirard | 1,610 | 5.52 | -2.77 |
| Green | Alex Tyrrell | 1,318 | 4.52 | -1.20 |
| Marxist–Leninist | Rachel Hoffman | 78 | 0.27 | -0.01 |
| Total valid votes | | 29,155 | 99.35 | – |
| Total rejected ballots | | 192 | 0.65 | – |
| Turnout | | 29,347 | 72.50 | +4.56 |
| Electors on the lists | | 40,476 | – | – |

2012 Quebec general election
| Party | Candidate | Votes | % | ±% |
|---|---|---|---|---|
| Liberal | Kathleen Weil | 16,761 | 62.65 | -5.33 |
| Coalition Avenir Québec | Angely M.Q. Pacis | 3,643 | 13.62 | +10.76* |
| Québec solidaire | David Mandel | 2,291 | 8.56 | – |
| Parti Québécois | Olivier Sirard | 2,217 | 8.29 | -5.37 |
| Green | Claude Sabourin | 1,531 | 5.72 | -8.67 |
| Option nationale | Sylvain Labranche | 236 | 0.88 | – |
| Marxist–Leninist | Rachel Hoffman | 74 | 0.28 | -0.45 |
| Total valid votes | | 26,753 | 99.31 | – |
| Total rejected ballots | | 187 | 0.69 | – |
| Turnout | | 26,940 | 67.94 | +24.92 |
| Electors on the lists | | 39,652 | – | – |

* Result compared to Action démocratique

2008 Quebec general election: Notre-Dame-de-Grâce
| Party | Candidate | Votes | % | ±% |
|---|---|---|---|---|
| Liberal | Kathleen Weil | 11,475 | 67.98 | +6.65 |
| Green | Peter McQueen | 2,430 | 14.39 | −1.34 |
| Parti Québécois | Fabrice Martel | 2,307 | 13.66 | +3.08 |
| Action démocratique | Matthew Conway | 483 | 2.86 | −4.34 |
| Marxist–Leninist | Linda Sullivan | 124 | 0.73 | +0.43 |
| Independent | David Sommer Rovins | 64 | 0.38 | |
| Total valid votes | | 16,883 | 98.66 | |
| Rejected and declined votes | | 230 | 1.34 | |
| Turnout | | 17,113 | 43.02 | −15.50 |
| Electors on the lists | | 39,780 | | |

Political offices
| Preceded by Jacques Dupuis | Minister of Justice (Quebec); 2008–2010 | Succeeded by Jean-Marc Fournier |
| Preceded by Yolande James | Minister of Immigration and Cultural Communities; 2010–2012 | Succeeded by Diane De Courcy |
| Preceded by Diane De Courcy | Minister of Immigration, Diversity and Inclusiveness; 2014–2018 | Succeeded by Simon Jolin-Barrette |
