= Harold Thuringer =

Canadian politician (born 1934)

MNA for Notre-Dame-de-Grâce
- In office 1987–1989
- Preceded by: Reed Scowen
- Succeeded by: Gordon Atkinson

Personal details
- Born: October 21, 1934 (age 91) Vibank, Saskatchewan, Canada
- Party: Liberal
- Profession: Social worker

Harold Thuringer (born October 21, 1934) is a former Canadian politician who represented Notre-Dame-de-Grâce in the National Assembly of Quebec from 1987 to 1989.

== Early life ==
Thuringer was born in Vibank, Saskatchewan.

== Professional career ==
A social worker, Thuringer was elected to the legislature in a by-election in 1987, following the resignation of Reed Scowen. He was defeated in the 1989 election by Gordon Atkinson of the Equality Party.

== Electoral record ==
1989 Quebec general election: Notre-Dame-de-Grâce
Party	Candidate	Votes	%	±%
Equality	Gordon Atkinson	11,638	43.03	–
Liberal	Harold Thuringer	9,548	35.30	−26.74
Parti Québécois	Suzanne Morin	3,017	11.15	+4.52
Green	Nicole Painchaud	2,024	7.48	–
New Democratic	Michel Decoste	388	1.43	−24.10
Independent	Marc Brunel Belhomme	234	0.87	–
Progressive Conservative	Jean-Christophe Coppenrath	143	0.53	–
Marxist–Leninist	Margaret Frain	55	0.20	–

Notre-Dame-de-Grâce by-election, September 14, 1987
Party	Candidate	Votes	%	±%
Liberal	Harold Thuringer	8,622	62.04	-15.79
New Democratic	Hélène Guay	3,548	25.53	+16.89
Parti Québécois	Sébastien Richard	921	6.63	-5.58
Independent	Jay Laurence Taylor	335	2.41	-
Parti créditiste	Denis Patenaude	251	1.80	-
Humanist	Richard Banville	86	0.62	+0.02
Parti indépendantiste	Stéphane Duchesne	86	0.62	-
Workers	Serge Turmel	49	0.35	-
