= Gordon Atkinson (Canadian politician) =

Canadian politician

MNA for Notre-Dame-de-Grâce
- In office 1989–1994
- Preceded by: Harold Thuringer
- Succeeded by: Russell Copeman

Personal details
- Born: August 24, 1922 Winnipeg, Manitoba
- Died: January 13, 2006 (aged 83)
- Party: Equality Party
- Profession: broadcaster

Gordon William Atkinson (August 24, 1922 – January 13, 2006) was a broadcaster and politician in Quebec, Canada.

== Background ==
Gordon Atkinson was born in Winnipeg, Manitoba, the son of William James Atkinson, officer of the Canadian Armed Forces, and Martha Kathleen Johnson. He was an infantry officer with the Calgary Highlanders during the Second World War and served in the Northwest Europe campaign. After the war Gordon moved to Los Angeles as a TV, radio and motion picture actor, writer and director. He received his training at the Pasadena Playhouse, where he studied with notables as Carolyn Jones (The Adams Family) and Barbara Hale (Perry Mason's secretary, Della Street).

Atkinson became a radio announcer in Calgary, Alberta, in 1937. Between 1946 and 1950 he worked in radio, cinema and theatre both in Los Angeles and Canada. In the early 1950s he rejoined the Canadian Army with Princess Patricia's Canadian Light Infantry (PPCLI) for the Korean War, serving in Korea and Japan. After the war, he was asked by the CBC to become a teacher of television for the newly created CBC-TV in Toronto. From 1955 to 1957 he worked as an advisor to Prime Minister Louis St. Laurent.

He moved to Winnipeg from Toronto in 1954 as CBC Program Manager. While there, he created many television shows, most of which were brought under question due to the morals of the time. He hired a night club entertainer and his wife as a (male) host for an entertainment program. The program was cancelled as common folk objected to a night club owner/entertainer involved in Television. While in Winnipeg, he helped to bring up lines from B.C. to Vancouver, and created Vancouver CBC Television. He later moved his family to Montreal, where he worked in theatre at the Mountain Playhouse for many years. He was actor, director, and voice actor in the community. He also directed many plays at McGill University (Wry and Ginger 1959).

From 1957 to 1980 Atkinson was a CBC TV sports commentator, working out of Montreal, covering all Olympic, Pan-American, Canadian and international events. Throughout the 1980s, Gordon was a political / social commentator on CJAD 800 in Montreal. His radio work was paused when he was elected a Member of the Quebec National Assembly in 1989. He served one term and then got back into radio from 1993 to 1997 as political and social commentator for CIQC 600 AM radio in Montreal. Atkinson retired in 1998, but recorded a two-hour program broadcast every Remembrance Day (November 11) on CJAD 800 AM radio. The program was given to CJAD in perpetuity, in memory of "those friends who were killed in the two wars in which I participated."

In the early 1960s he worked as a bit player in many films about Canada, and was also a regular on Seaway, a CBC series, filmed in Quebec City.

== Provincial politics ==
In the general election of 1989, he ran as the Equality Party (EP) candidate in the Montreal riding of Notre-Dame-de-Grâce. Atkinson defeated Liberal incumbent Harold Thuringer and become a Member of the National Assembly of Quebec.

By March 29, 1994, Atkinson quit EP and filled his seat as an Independent. He was defeated by Liberal candidate Russell Copeman in 1994.

== Titles ==
Commander, Most Ven. Order of St. John of Jerusalem; Bd. of Din, St. John Ambulance & St. John Fdn. 1980– ; Knight of Justice, St. Lazarus of Jerusalem, Board of Directors St. John Ambulance and St. John Fdn (1980) Hon. Aide de camp to Lieutenant-Governor of Quebec 1989–2005

== Awards ==
- 1967 – Centennial Medal for most beautiful small farm in Quebec (St. Eustache (Parish))
- 1976 – Actra Award – Radio Commentary
- 1976 – Short TV Documentary
- 1989 – Nellie – Editorial Commentary (Radio)

== Boards ==
- 1993–1996 – Board of Directors – Catherine Booth Hospital
- 1985–1991 – Director, CH of St. James the Apostle (Anglican)
- 1989 – Heraldry Society of Canada (Montreal Chapter)
- 1991 – Member, United Empire Loyalist
- 1988 – Board of Directors – War Veterans Homes (Quebec)
- 1980–1982 – President, Montreal Press Club

== Honorary positions ==
- 1967–1978 – Honorary Secretary Montreal Hunt Club
- 1980–2003 – Hon. Lt-Col 78th Fraser Highlanders
- 1980 – Founding Member, Equality Party

== Recreation ==
- Fox Hunting (Montreal Hunt Club)
- Equestrian Competitions (Hunter Trials all over Canada and Europe)
- Tennis (Club – Mount Stephen, Montreal)

== Personal life ==
Gordon Atkinson was married from 1952 to 1977 to Lucy Leach, a singer with Leslie Bell Singers. She appeared on CBC the first night they aired television. They had three children: Kathryn, Marta, and Christopher.

He is survived by four grandchildren: Adrianna, Kathryn, Kellina and Andrew.

In 1986, he married Constance (divorced 1997). The marriage produced no children.

Atkinson is survived by his widow, Pierrette (2004). At his death, he had been ill for some time and had been living in a seniors residence.
