= Russell Copeman =

Canadian politician

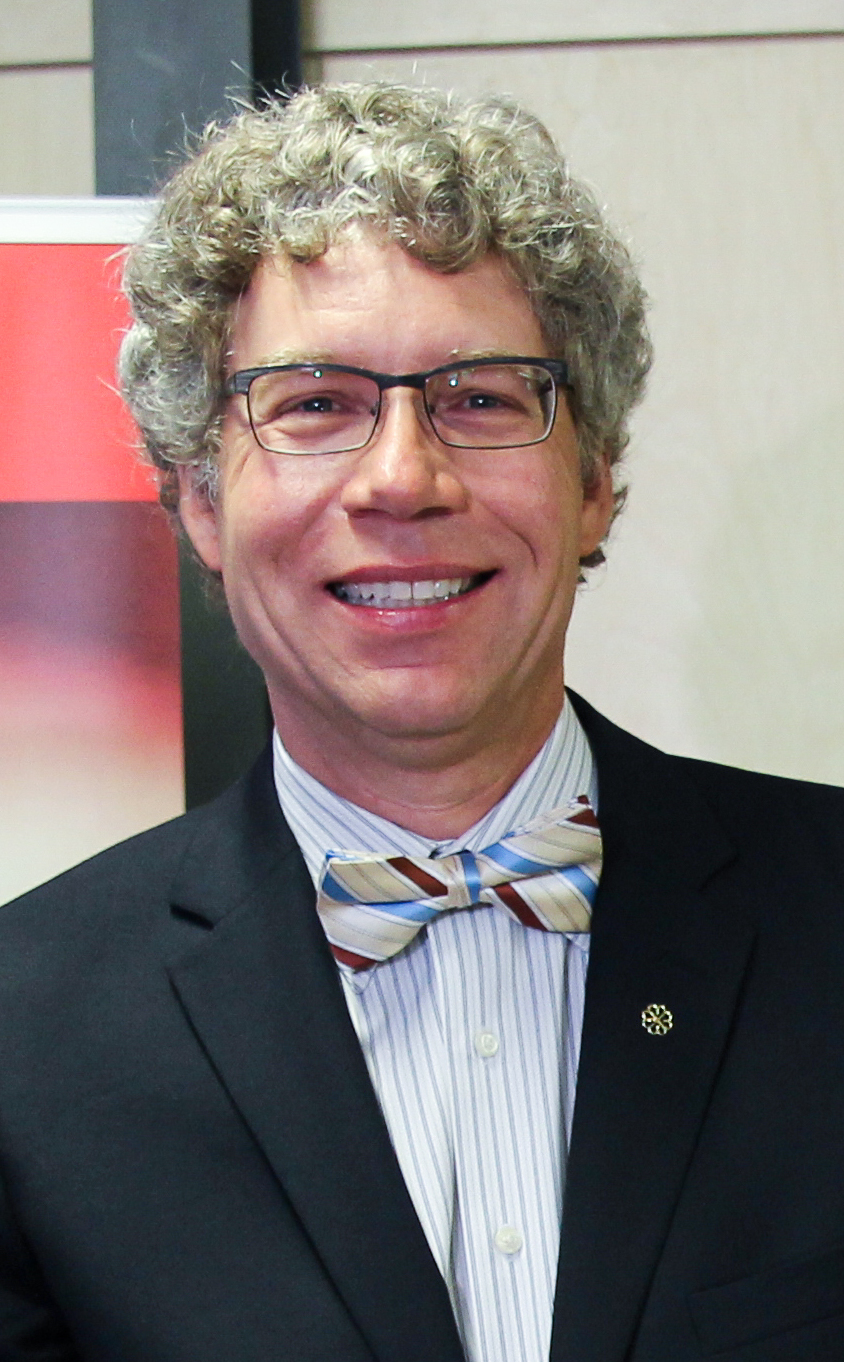
- Russell Copeman in 2016.

Borough mayor of Côte-des-Neiges–Notre-Dame-de-Grâce
- In office November 14, 2013 – November 16, 2017
- Preceded by: Lionel Perez (interim)
- Succeeded by: Sue Montgomery

MNA for Notre-Dame-de-Grâce
- In office September 12, 1994 – October 22, 2008
- Preceded by: Gordon Atkinson
- Succeeded by: Kathleen Weil

Personal details
- Born: April 1, 1960 (age 66) Montreal, Quebec
- Party: Coalition Montréal (municipal); Quebec Liberal Party (provincial)
- Education: McGill University; Concordia University

Russell Copeman (born April 1, 1960) is a Canadian politician. He was a Montreal City Councillor and was the borough mayor for Côte-des-Neiges-Notre-Dame-de-Grace from November 14, 2013 to November 16, 2017. He also sat on the Montreal Executive Committee, and was responsible for housing, urban planning, buildings, real estate transactions and strategies, and the Office of Public Consultation.

He was the Liberal Member of the National Assembly of Quebec (MNA) representing the riding of Notre-Dame-de-Grâce from 1994 to 2008.

== Education ==
Born in Montreal, Quebec, Copeman graduated from Vanier College and received a Bachelor of Arts with honours in political science from McGill University in 1983. While at McGill, in 1982 he was the Prime Minister of the Parlement Jeunesse du Québec, then known as the Quebec Youth Parliament. He attended Concordia University in 1984 where he pursued graduate studies in public administration.

== Provincial politics ==
From 1986 to 1988, he was the Assistant Director of the Education Program, Director of Social Affairs and Director of the Education Program for Alliance Quebec.

In 1989, he was the political aide to the Minister of Energy and Resources. From 1989 to 1991, he was the Quebec Liberal Party coordinator and from 1991 to 1994 he was the constituency assistant to former Quebec Premier Robert Bourassa.

In the 1994 election, he was elected to the National Assembly in Notre-Dame-de-Grâce. He was re-elected in the 1998, 2003 and 2007 elections. He was chair of the Standing Committee on Social Affairs from June 2003 to February 2007. He was the Parliamentary Assistant to the Minister of Health and Social Services. Active in National Assembly relations with the United States he was the 2007 Chairman of the Council of State Government's Eastern Regional Conference.

Copeman resigned on October 22, 2008 after accepting a job as Associate Vice-President at Concordia University.

== Montreal municipal politics ==
Copeman ran as a candidate for Coalition Montréal as part of the November 3, 2013 municipal election and was elected to Montreal City Council as borough mayor of Côte-des-Neiges–Notre-Dame-de-Grâce. On November 18, 2013, he was appointed to the Montreal Executive Committee by Mayor Denis Coderre, on which he is responsible for housing, urban planning, buildings, real estate transactions and strategies, and the Office of Public Consultation.

In November 2016, Copeman became a part of Équipe Denis Coderre pour Montréal.

== Personal life ==
He is married and has three children.

== Electoral record (partial) ==
2013 Montreal municipal election: Borough Mayor, Côte-des-Neiges–Notre-Dame-de-Grâce
| Party | Candidate | Votes | % | ±% |
|---|---|---|---|---|
| Coalition Montréal | Russell Copeman | 10,482 | 29.42 | – |
| Projet Montréal | Michael Simkin | 9,348 | 26.24 | +0.23 |
| Vrai changement | Andrew Ross | 7,918 | 22.22 | – |
| Équipe Denis Coderre | Kevin Copps | 7,880 | 22.12 | – |
| Total valid votes | | 35,628 | 97.23 | – |
| Total rejected ballots | | 1,014 | 2.77 | – |
| Turnout | | 36,642 | 38.74 | +2.65 |
| Electors on the lists | | 94,587 | – | – |
Source: Election results, 2013, City of Montreal.

2007 Quebec general election: Notre-Dame-de-Grâce
| Party | Candidate | Votes | % | ±% |
|---|---|---|---|---|
| Liberal | Russell Copeman | 14,077 | 61.43 | −13.16 |
| Green | Peter McQueen | 3,605 | 15.73 | +11.15 |
| Parti Québécois | Sophie Fréchette | 2,425 | 10.58 | −3.07 |
| Action démocratique | Julie Clouatre | 1,649 | 7.20 | +2.37 |
| Québec solidaire | David Mandel | 1,091 | 4.76 | - |
| Marxist–Leninist | Linda Sullivan | 69 | 0.30 | +0.02 |
| Total valid votes | | 22,916 | 99.41 | |
| Rejected and declined votes | | 137 | 0.59 | |
| Turnout | | 23,053 | 58.52 | −3.28 |
| Electors on the lists | | 39,392 | | |
