= Notre-Dame-de-Grâce (provincial electoral district) =

Provincial electoral district in Quebec, Canada

Coordinates: 45°28′N 73°38′W

Quebec electoral district
- Location in Montreal

Provincial electoral district
- Legislature: National Assembly of Quebec
MNA
Désirée McGraw
Liberal
- District created: 1965
- First contested: 1966
- Last contested: 2026

Demographics
- Population (2011): 60,790
- Electors (2018): 40,476
- Area (km²): 8.7
- Pop. density (per km²): 6,987.4
- Census division: Montreal (part)
- Census subdivision(s): Montreal (part), Montreal West

Notre-Dame-de-Grâce (French: [nɔtʁə dam də ɡʁɑs], locally [nɔtʁ̥œ̈ dam dœ̈ ɡʁɑːs]) is a provincial electoral district in the Montreal region of Quebec, Canada, that elects members to the National Assembly of Quebec. It comprises the city of Montreal West and part of the Côte-des-Neiges–Notre-Dame-de-Grâce borough of the city of Montreal.

It was created for the 1966 election from part of the Montréal–Notre-Dame-de-Grâce electoral district.

In the change from the 2001 to the 2011 electoral map, it lost some territory to the Saint-Henri–Sainte-Anne electoral district. In the change from the 2011 to the 2017 electoral map, the riding gains the remainder of the Notre-Dame-de-Grâce neighbourhood from D'Arcy-McGee.

== Linguistic demographics ==
- Anglophone: 41.9%
- Allophone: 31.1%
- Francophone: 27.0%

== Members of the Legislative Assembly / National Assembly ==
Legislature	Years	Member	Party
Riding created from Montréal–Notre-Dame-de-Grâce
28th	1966–1968	Eric Kierans	Liberal
28th	1968–1970	William Tetley	Liberal
29th	1970–1973	William Tetley	Liberal
30th	1973–1976	William Tetley	Liberal
31st	1976–1978	Bryce Mackasey	Liberal
31st	1978–1981	Reed Scowen	Liberal
32nd	1981–1985	Reed Scowen	Liberal
33rd	1985–1987	Reed Scowen	Liberal
33rd	1987–1989	Harold Thuringer	Liberal
34th	1989–1994	Gordon Atkinson	Equality
34th	1994–1994	Gordon Atkinson	Independent
35th	1994–1998	Russell Copeman	Liberal
36th	1998–2003	Russell Copeman	Liberal
37th	2003–2007	Russell Copeman	Liberal
38th	2007–2008	Russell Copeman	Liberal
39th	2008–2012	Kathleen Weil	Liberal
40th	2012–2014	Kathleen Weil	Liberal
41st	2014–2018	Kathleen Weil	Liberal
42nd	2018–2022	Kathleen Weil	Liberal
43rd	2022–2026	Désirée McGraw	Liberal
44th	2026–Present	Désirée McGraw	Liberal

== Election results ==
2026 Quebec general election
** Preliminary results — Not yet official **
Party	Candidate	Votes	%	±%
Liberal	Désirée McGraw	16,355	61.04	
Québec solidaire	Élise Davignon	4,761	17.77	
Conservative	Guillaume St-Pierre	2,126	7.93	
Parti Québécois	Vincent Hubert	1,586	5.92	
Coalition Avenir Québec	Kaan Altintas	767	2.86	
Green	Alex Tyrrell	679	2.53	
Canadian	Christian Turgeon	356	1.33	
Marxist–Leninist	Rachel Hoffman	103	0.38	
Communist	Ivan Byard	63	0.24	
Total valid votes				
Total rejected ballots				
Turnout			57.09	
Electors on the lists			–	–
Source: Élections Québec

2022 Quebec general election
Party	Candidate	Votes	%	±%
Liberal	Désirée McGraw	12,918	50.46	-12.52
Québec solidaire	Élisabeth Labelle	3,967	15.49	+3.65
Conservative	Roy Eappen	2,087	8.15	+6.64
Coalition Avenir Québec	Geneviève Lemay	1,877	7.33	-0.68
Bloc Montreal	Balarama Holness	1,701	6.64	–
Parti Québécois	Cloé Rose Jenneau	1,302	5.09	-0.37
Green	Alex Tyrrell	956	3.73	-2.94
Canadian	Constantine Eliadis	723	2.82	–
Marxist–Leninist	Rachel Hoffman	71	0.28	-0.03
Total valid votes		25,602	98.72	–
Total rejected ballots		332	1.28	–
Turnout		25,934	55.76	-0.38
Electors on the lists		46,506	–	–

2018 Quebec general election
Party	Candidate	Votes	%	±%
Liberal	Kathleen Weil	16,843	62.98	-13.63
Québec solidaire	Kathleen Gudmundsson	3,166	11.84	+4.42
Coalition Avenir Québec	Nathalie Dansereau	2,142	8.01	+2.35
Green	Chad Walcott	1,785	6.67	+2.15
Parti Québécois	Lucie Bélanger	1,460	5.46	-0.06
New Democratic	David-Roger Gagnon	708	2.65	
Conservative	Souhail Ftouh	405	1.51	
Independent	Cynthia Nichols	151	0.56	
Marxist–Leninist	Rachel Hoffman	82	0.31	+0.04
Total valid votes		26,742	99.08	
Total rejected ballots		249	0.92	
Turnout		26,991	56.14	
Eligible voters		48,076		
Liberal hold		Swing		-9.025
Source(s) "Rapport des résultats officiels du scrutin". Élections Québec.

2014 Quebec general election
Party	Candidate	Votes	%	±%
Liberal	Kathleen Weil	22,336	76.61	+13.96
Québec solidaire	Annick Desjardins	2,164	7.42	-1.14
Coalition Avenir Québec	Noah Sidel	1,649	5.66	-7.96
Parti Québécois	Olivier Sirard	1,610	5.52	-2.76
Green	Alex Tyrrell	1,318	4.52	-1.20
Marxist–Leninist	Rachel Hoffman	78	0.27	-0.01
Total valid votes		29,155	99.35	–
Total rejected ballots		192	0.65	-0.04
Turnout		29,347	72.50	+4.56
Electors on the lists		40,476	–	–
Liberal hold		Swing		+7.55

2012 Quebec general election
Party	Candidate	Votes	%	±%
Liberal	Kathleen Weil	16,761	62.65	-5.33
Coalition Avenir Québec	Angely M.Q. Pacis	3,643	13.62	+10.76*
Québec solidaire	David Mandel	2,291	8.56	–
Parti Québécois	Olivier Sirard	2,217	8.29	-5.37
Green	Claude Sabourin	1,531	5.72	-8.67
Option nationale	Sylvain Labranche	236	0.88	–
Marxist–Leninist	Rachel Hoffman	74	0.28	-0.45
Total valid votes		26,753	99.31	–
Total rejected ballots		187	0.69	–
Turnout		26,940	67.94	+24.92
Electors on the lists		39,652	–	–

* Result compared to Action démocratique

2008 Quebec general election
Party	Candidate	Votes	%	±%
Liberal	Kathleen Weil	11,475	67.98	+6.65
Green	Peter McQueen	2,430	14.39	−1.34
Parti Québécois	Fabrice Martel	2,307	13.66	+3.08
Action démocratique	Matthew Conway	483	2.86	−4.34
Marxist–Leninist	Linda Sullivan	124	0.73	+0.43
Independent	David Sommer Rovins	64	0.38	
Total valid votes		16,883	98.66	
Rejected and declined votes		230	1.34	
Turnout		17,113	43.02	−15.50
Electors on the lists		39,780		

2007 Quebec general election
Party	Candidate	Votes	%	±%
Liberal	Russell Copeman	14,077	61.43	−13.16
Green	Peter McQueen	3,605	15.73	+11.15
Parti Québécois	Sophie Fréchette	2,425	10.58	−3.07
Action démocratique	Julie Clouatre	1,649	7.20	+2.37
Québec solidaire	David Mandel	1,091	4.76	-
Marxist–Leninist	Linda Sullivan	69	0.30	+0.02
Total valid votes		22,916	99.41	
Rejected and declined votes		137	0.59	
Turnout		23,053	58.52	−3.28
Electors on the lists		39,392		

2003 Quebec general election
Party	Candidate	Votes	%	±%
Liberal	Russell Copeman	18,911	74.59	-3.03
Parti Québécois	Laurent Malépart	3,460	13.65	+0.32
Action démocratique	Allan Patrick	1,225	4.83	+1.47
Green	Jessica Gal	1,084	4.28	–
Bloc Pot	Helene Jutras	261	1.03	–
Equality	Peter Sauvé	246	0.97	-3.02
Christian Democracy	Thomas Kernan	96	0.38	–
Marxist–Leninist	Rachel Hoffman	71	0.28	+0.09
Total valid votes		25,354	99.45	–
Total rejected ballots		139	0.55	–
Turnout		25,493	61.80	-12.12
Electors on the lists		41,253	–	–

1998 Quebec general election
Party	Candidate	Votes	%	±%
Liberal	Russell Copeman	22,627	77.62	+4.54
Parti Québécois	Chantal Pelletier	3,886	13.33	+0.69
Equality	Keith Henderson	1,163	3.99	-0.71
Action démocratique	Benoit Turcotte	980	3.36	–
Socialist Democracy	Marie Bertrand	256	0.88	-0.49
Natural Law	Elizabeth Gibson	140	0.48	+0.10
Marxist–Leninist	Marsha Fine	55	0.19	–
Communist	Malek Khouri	44	0.15	–

1995 Quebec referendum
Side	Votes	%
Non	31,306	86.57
Oui	4,855	13.43

1994 Quebec general election
Party	Candidate	Votes	%	±%
Liberal	Russell Copeman	21,716	73.08	+37.38
Parti Québécois	Denise Plamondon	3,755	12.64	+1.49
No designation	Gordon Atkinson	1,628	5.48	-37.55
Equality	Keith Henderson	1,396	4.70	-38.33
New Democrat	Marie Bertrand	406	1.37	-0.06
Green	Mathieu Raymond-Beaubien	397	1.34	-6.14
CANADA!	Serge Baruchel	182	0.61	–
No designation	Al Rhino Feldman	124	0.42	–
Natural Law	Frederic Klein	112	0.38	–

1992 Charlottetown Accord referendum
Side	Votes	%
Oui	24,978	80.11
Non	6,201	19.89

1989 Quebec general election
Party	Candidate	Votes	%	±%
Equality	Gordon Atkinson	11,638	43.03	–
Liberal	Harold Thuringer	9,548	35.30	−26.74
Parti Québécois	Suzanne Morin	3,017	11.15	+4.52
Green	Nicole Painchaud	2,024	7.48	–
New Democratic	Michel Decoste	388	1.43	−24.10
Independent	Marc Brunel Belhomme	234	0.87	–
Progressive Conservative	Jean-Christophe Coppenrath	143	0.53	–
Marxist–Leninist	Margaret Frain	55	0.20	–

Quebec provincial by-election, September 14, 1987
Party	Candidate	Votes	%	±%
Liberal	Harold Thuringer	8,622	62.04	-15.79
New Democrat	Hélène Guay	3,548	25.53	+16.89
Parti Québécois	Sébastien Richard	921	6.63	-5.58
Independent	Jay Laurence Taylor	335	2.41	–
Lemon	Denis Patenaude	251	1.80	–
Humanist	Richard Banville	86	0.62	+0.02
Parti indépendantiste	Stéphane Duchesne	86	0.62	–
Workers	Serge Turmel	49	0.35	–

1985 Quebec general election
Party	Candidate	Votes	%	±%
Liberal	Reed Scowen	21,024	77.83	-4.13
Parti Québécois	Jean-Guy Mailloux	3,298	12.21	-1.93
New Democrat	Michel Agnaieff	2,333	8.64	–
Humanist	Gertrude Retieff-Caisse	162	0.60	–
Commonwealth of Canada	Alain Gaudreault	113	0.42	–
Christian Socialist	Michel Lacroix	82	0.30	–

1981 Quebec general election
Party	Candidate	Votes	%	±%
Liberal	Reed Scowen	24,821	81.96	+19.73
Parti Québécois	Kevin Henley	4,281	14.14	+2.73
Libertarian	David Bonet	507	1.67	–
Freedom of Choice	Roopnarine Singh	501	1.65	-22.58
Union Nationale	Raymond Tanguay	174	0.58	-1.06

1980 Quebec referendum
Side	Votes	%
Non	26,843	85.28
Oui	4,633	14.72

Quebec provincial by-election, July 5, 1978
Party	Candidate	Votes	%	±%
Liberal	Reed Scowen	12,797	62.23	+13.36
Freedom of Choice	David De Jong	4,983	24.23	–
Parti Québécois	Michel Gélinas	2,347	11.41	-2.26
Union Nationale	Albert Brulotte	338	1.64	-27.47
Workers	Gérard Lachance	100	0.49	–

1976 Quebec general election
Party	Candidate	Votes	%	±%
Liberal	Bryce Mackasey	13,161	43.87	-37.77
Union Nationale	Francis Donaldson	8,732	29.11	+27.62
Parti Québécois	Pierre Mailloux	4,100	13.67	+0.86
Democratic Alliance	Robert Keaton	3,497	11.66	–
Ralliement créditiste	Auguste Gagné	167	0.56	-3.50
Parti national populaire	Carl B. O'Malley	119	0.40	–
Independent	John J. Raudsepp	117	0.39	–
NDP – RMS coalition	Cyril Durocher	103	0.34	–

1973 Quebec general election
Party	Candidate	Votes	%	±%
Liberal	William Tetley	23,263	81.64	-5.62
Parti Québécois	Georges-Étienne Cartier	3,650	12.81	+5.21
Parti créditiste	Mary-Elizabeth Hall Taylor	1,156	4.06	+3.08
Union Nationale	Louise Bertrand	424	1.49	-0.37

1970 Quebec general election
Party	Candidate	Votes	%	±%
Liberal	William Tetley	31,930	87.26	+7.98
Parti Québécois	Jacqueline Dugas	2,783	7.60	–
New Democrat	Donald Robson Peacock	843	2.30	–
Union Nationale	Geneviève Faribault	680	1.86	-18.86
Ralliement créditiste	Paul J. Kingwell	357	0.98	–

Quebec provincial by-election, December 4, 1968
Party	Candidate	Votes	%	±%
Liberal	William Tetley	17,302	79.28	+2.86
Union Nationale	John Lynch-Staunton	4,521	20.72	+12.64

1966 Quebec general election
Party	Candidate	Votes	%	±%
Liberal	Eric Kierans	19,563	76.42	-9.20
Independent	Luke Gerald Dougherty	2,941	11.49	+7.15
Union Nationale	Dollard Dansereau	2,068	8.08	–
RIN	Walter Patrice O'Leary	949	3.71	–
Ralliement national	Marcien St-Aubin	77	0.30	–

== See also ==
- List of Quebec provincial electoral districts
- Canadian provincial electoral districts
