= Pasadena Convention Center =

Convention center in United States

Coordinates: 34.143383°N 118.144243°W

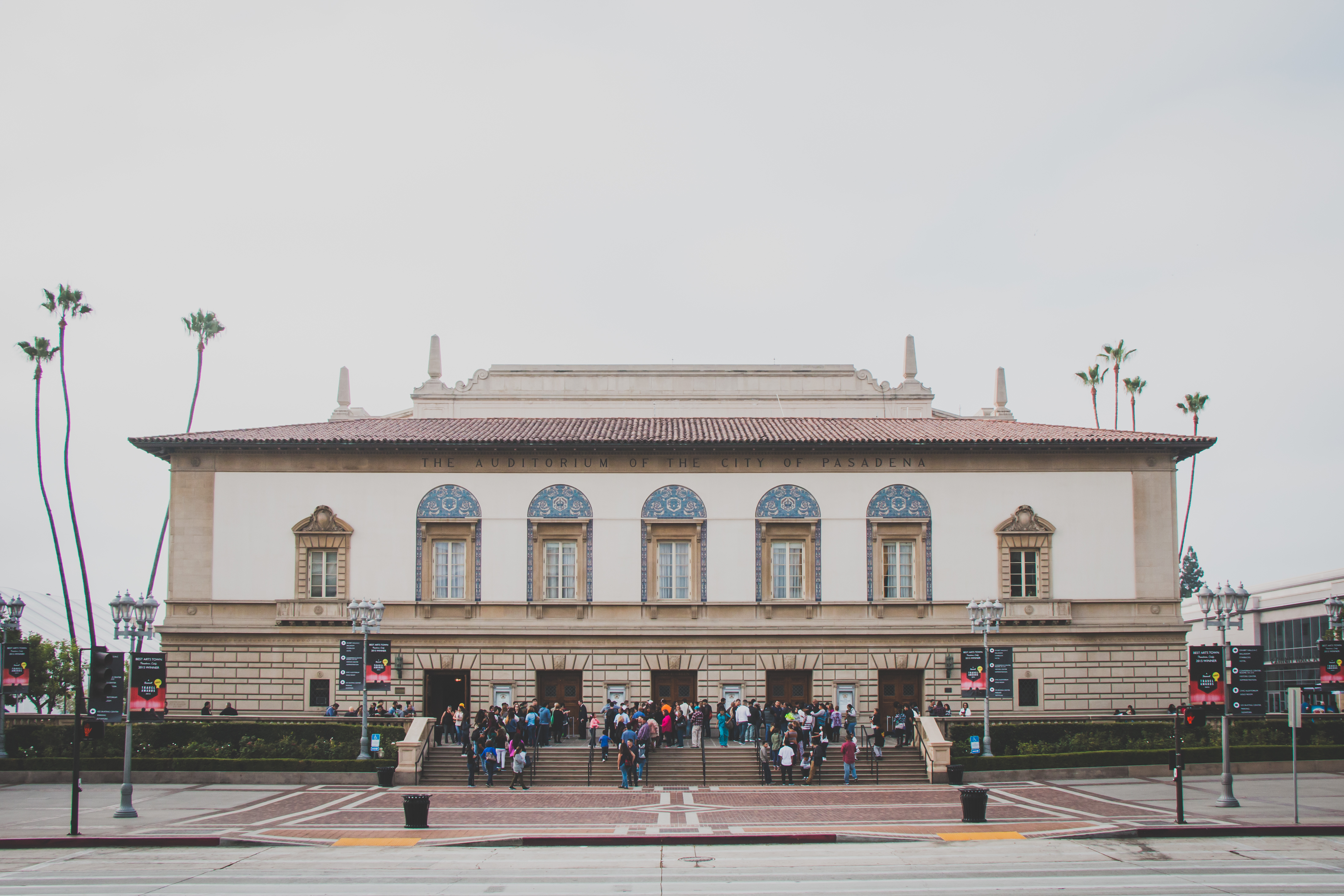
- Front entrance of Pasadena Civic Auditorium, part of the Pasadena Convention Center complex, in October 2016
- Interactive map of Pasadena Convention Center
- Address: 300 East Green Street
- Location: Pasadena, California, United States
- Owner: City of Pasadena
- Operator: Pasadena Center Operating Company
- Capacity: 1,664 (Exhibit Hall C); 2,552 (Ballroom); 2,997 (Pasadena Civic Auditorium); 5,290 (Exhibit Halls A&B)

Construction
- Built: 1931

The Pasadena Convention Center is a convention center in Pasadena, California, United States. It consists of three buildings.

== Pasadena Civic Auditorium ==
The Civic Auditorium, one of the major structures in the Pasadena Civic Center District, was built in 1931 and is best known for being the home for the Emmy Awards from 1977 until 1997. It was designed by architects George Edwin Bergstrom, Cyril Bennett, and Fitch Haskell. It is the former home of the Pasadena Symphony Orchestra. It has also been used for some episodes of American Idol. It was used as the show's venue for "Hollywood Week" in seasons 1, 3 and 10. The 3,029-seat theater hosts musicals, operas and concerts, among other events, on its 56 by 42 ft (17 by 13 m) stage.

The venue's theatre organ was acquired in 1979, having been commissioned from American firm M. P. Möller in 1938 as a touring organ by Englishman Reginald Foort, who attended its Pasadena inauguration on April 23, 1980. It had been used by the BBC during and after World War II.

In addition to the main auditorium, the Civic Auditorium building originally contained two lecture rooms and an exhibition hall of 100 by 200 ft (30 by 61 m).

The auditorium was famously the site of some of the earliest live performances of Van Halen before being discovered.

The Motown 25: Yesterday, Today, Forever special was taped here on March 25, 1983; and aired on NBC in May. The show is best remembered for Michael Jackson's performance of "Billie Jean" in which he debuted his signature dance move the "Moonwalk". Louis Armstrong's 1951 album Satchmo at Pasadena was also recorded here.

The annual NAACP Image Awards have been held at the Auditorium numerous times, including at least (earlier records are incomplete) 1992–2000, 2014–2018, 2020, 2023 and 2025, excluding 1995 (no awards presented), 2021 and 2022 (virtual due to the COVID-19 pandemic).

The auditorium has also been used for the Miss Teen USA 2007 pageant. The preliminary and final competitions were broadcast live on NBC.

From 2017 to 2019, the Auditorium hosted the 44th, 45th, and 46th Daytime Emmy Awards alongside their related 44th, 45th and 46th Daytime Creative Arts Emmy Awards.

The auditorium has hosted the America's Got Talent audition rounds since season 11 (2016). It also serves as the main venue for the live shows starting on season 17 (2022).

The auditorium hosts the annual Pasadena Unified School District graduation ceremonies for Blair High School, John Marshall Fundamental Secondary School, John Muir High School and Pasadena High School, which takes place after the Memorial Day holiday, since 2000.

== Exhibition Building ==
The Exhibition Building, adjacent to the west side of the Auditorium, features 50,000 sq ft (4,650 m^{2}) of exhibit space and can seat up to 4,400 for various events. Adjacent to the Exhibition Building is a 15,000 sq ft (1,400 m^{2}) annex seating up to 600 patrons.

The building holds large corporate events, conventions (such as CatCon), along with trade shows.

== Conference Building ==
The Conference Building, adjacent to the south side of the Auditorium, has 17 meeting rooms totaling 28,000 sq ft (2,600 m^{2}).

== Gallery ==
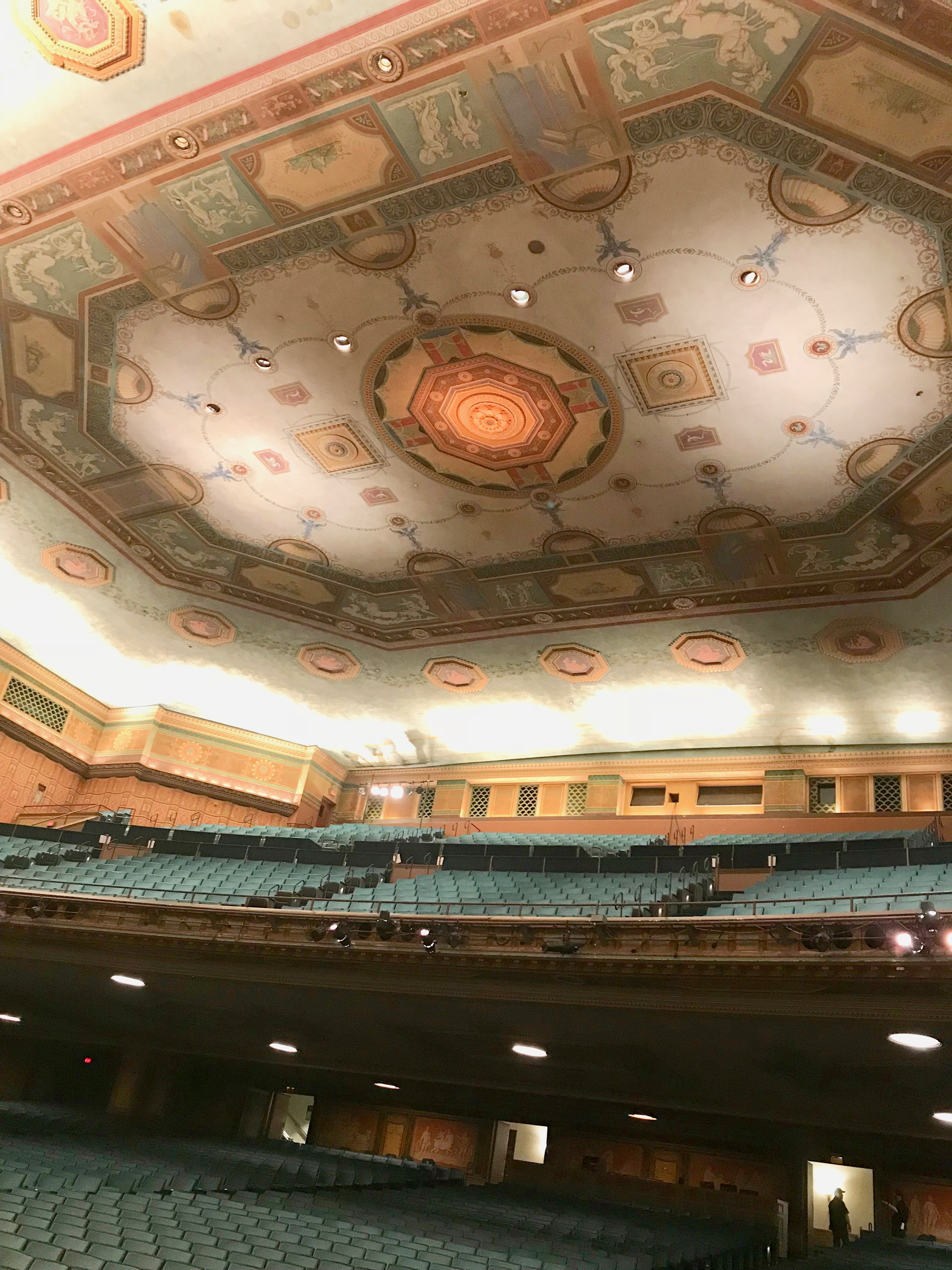
Inside the Pasadena Civic Auditorium

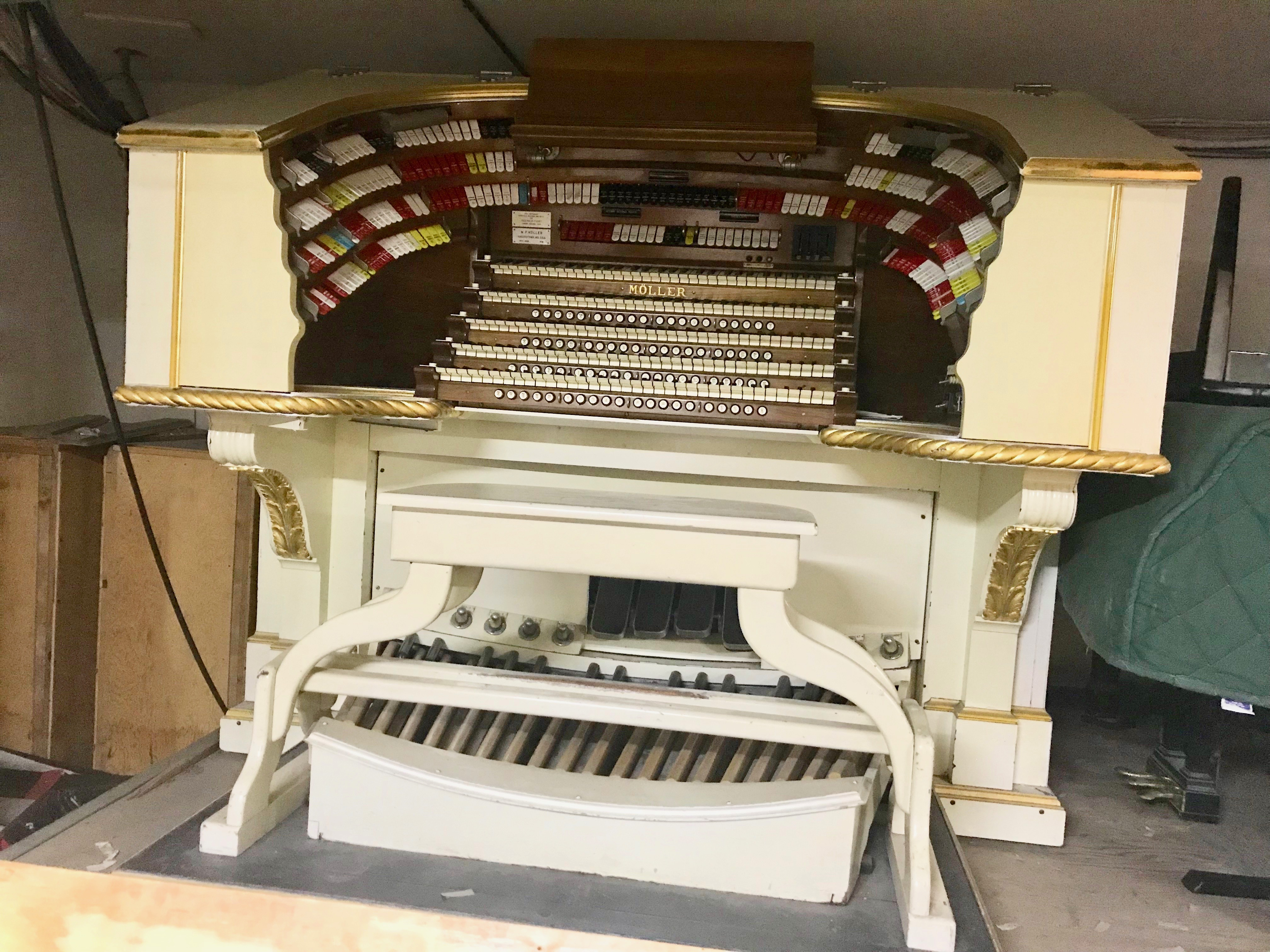
The theatre's Moller organ

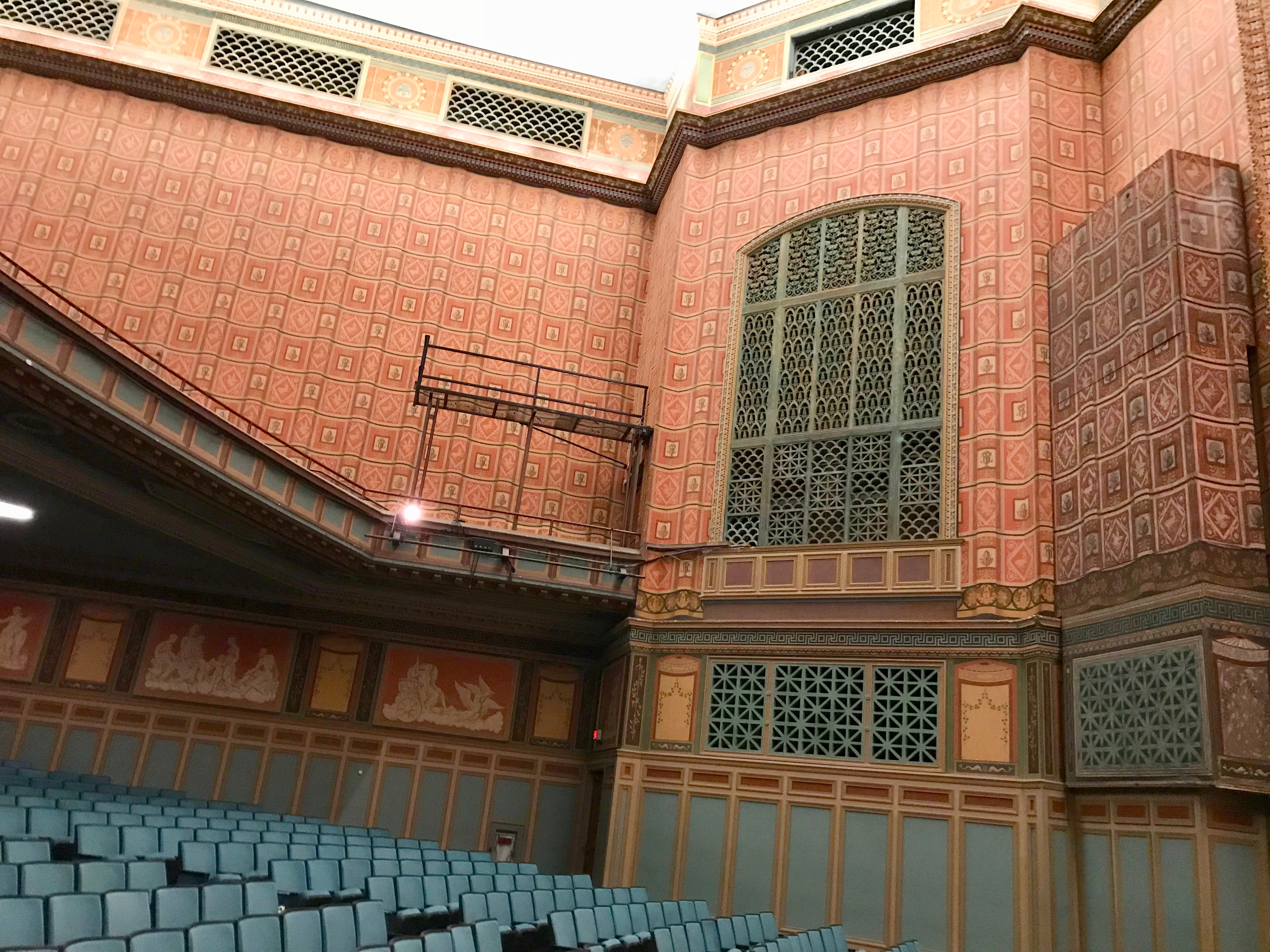
Handpainted walls inside the auditorium

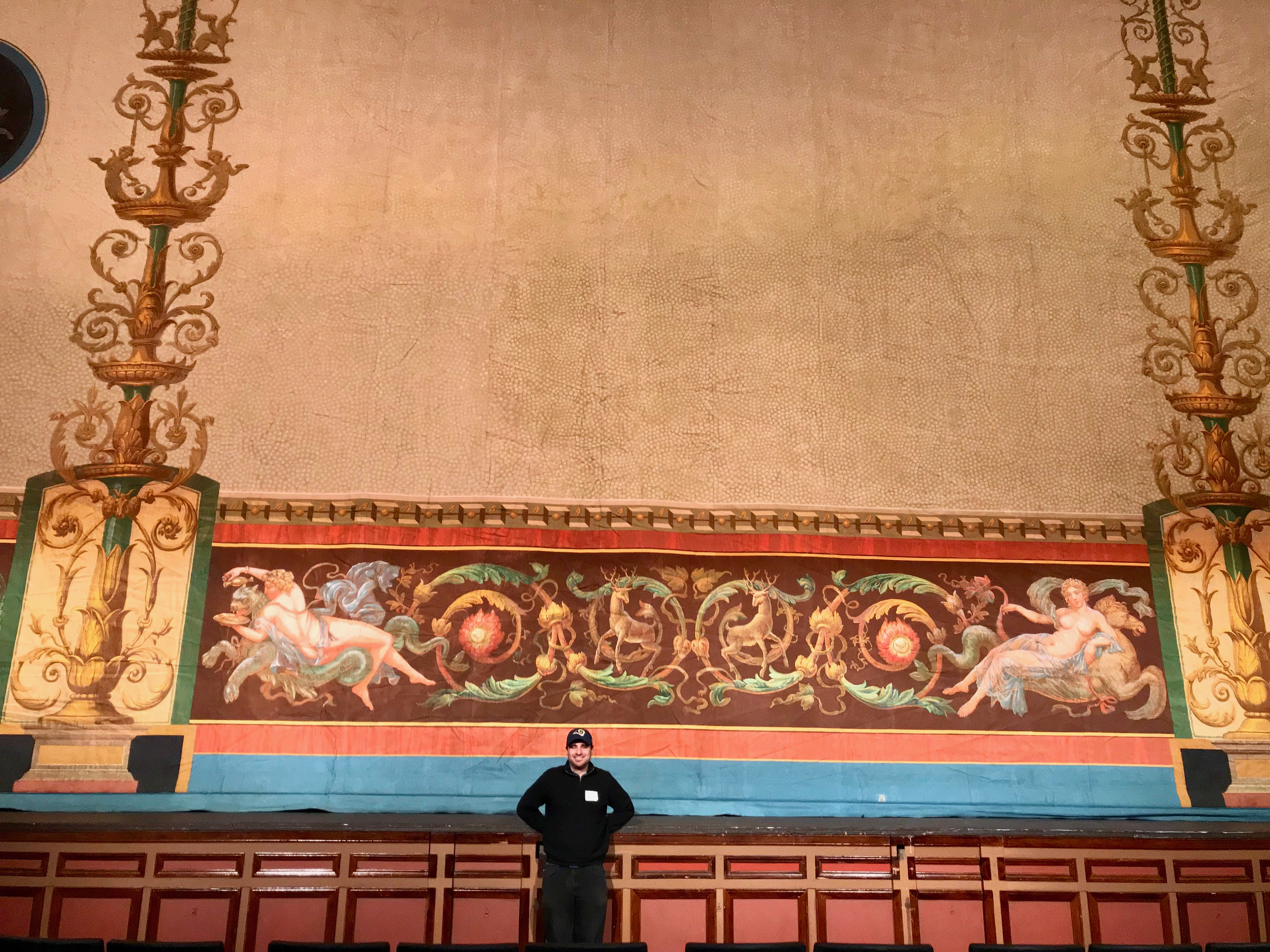
Handpainted curtain inside the auditorium

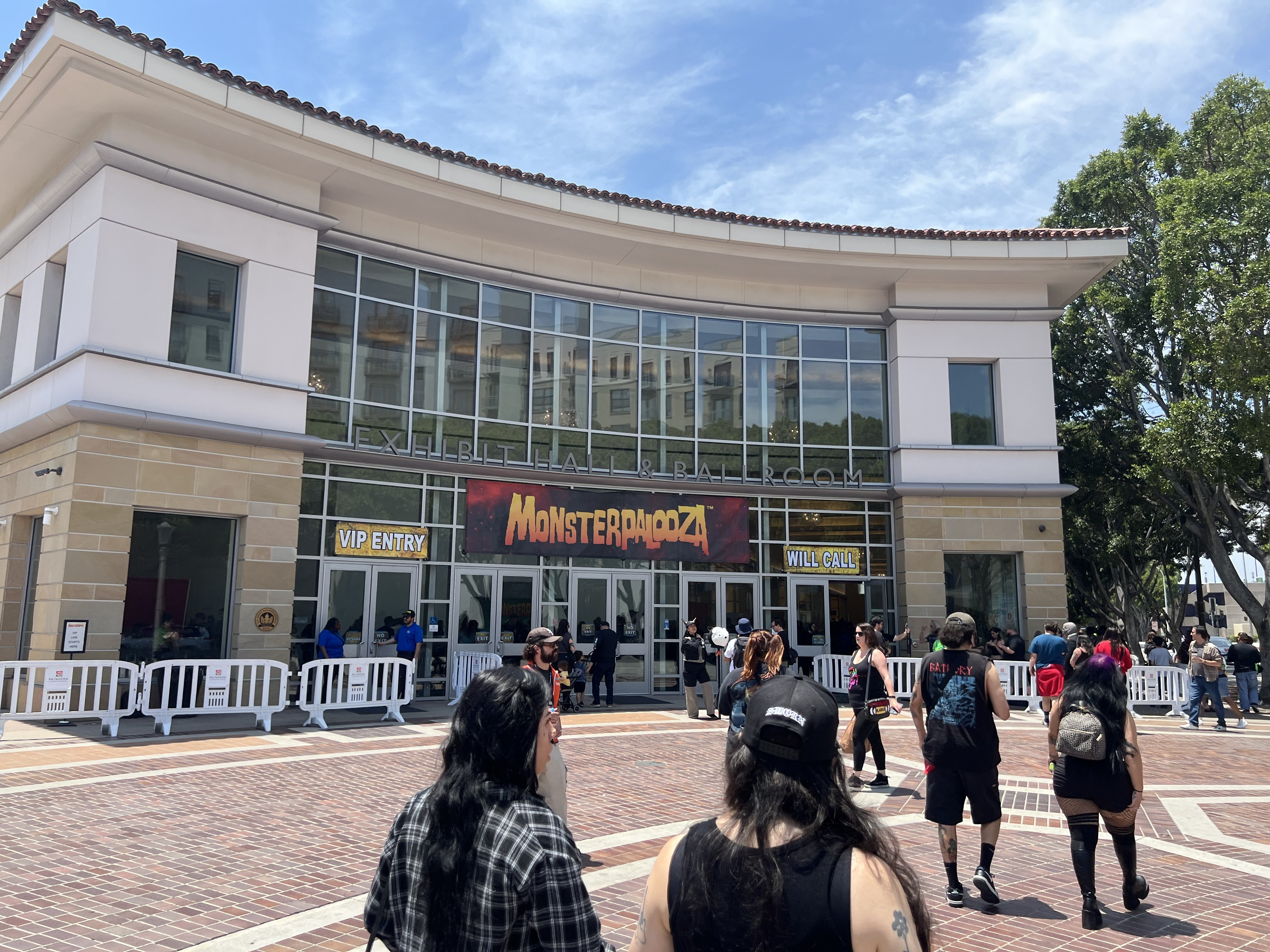
Pasadena Convention Center, while hosting Monsterpalooza in 2025

== Notable events ==
- FanFan, On the Road to Happiness world tour - January 26, 2018

== See also ==
- List of convention centers in the United States
