= Fitch Harrison Haskell =

American architect

- Born: October 30, 1883; Ashtabula, Ohio, U.S.
- Died: May 20, 1962 (aged 78); Santa Clara County, California, U.S.
- Education: Phillips Exeter Academy
- Alma mater: Harvard University; École des Beaux-Arts
- Occupation: Architect

Fitch Harrison Haskell (October 30, 1883 – May 20, 1962) was an American architect. He designed several buildings in Pasadena, California, including the Pasadena Civic Auditorium and All Saints' Episcopal Church.

== Education ==
He graduated from Phillips Exeter Academy in 1901 before getting his B.A. from Harvard College in 1905. He also received a B.S. from the Lawrence Scientific School (Harvard University) in 1906 and a D.P.L.G. from Ecole Nationale des Beaux-Arts In 1911. He was elected to Phi Beta Kappa while at Harvard University.
