= CatCon (convention) =

Convention for cat enthusiasts

- Genre: Cats
- Venue: Pasadena Convention Center (2015–present)
- Locations: Pasadena, California, US
- Next event: October 10 -11, 2026
- Website: Official website

CatCon is an annual convention and adoption event for cat enthusiasts held in Pasadena, California, United States. Founded by journalist Susan Michals, the event debuted in 2015 at The Reef in downtown Los Angeles, returned there in 2016, and has been hosted at the Pasadena Convention Center from 2017 onward. Described as a comic con for cat people, the event advocates for the adoption of cats and raises money for cat-related charities.

Celebrity guests at CatCon have included Angela Kinsey, Ian Somerhalder, Julie Newmar, and the firefighters of the Australian Firefighters Calendar. Among the expert speakers appearing at CatCon are Dr. Marty Becker, Dr. Matt McGlasson, and Sterling Davis.
