= William Tetley =

Canadian politician

William Tetley CM QC

MNA for Notre-Dame-de-Grâce
- In office 1968–1976
- Preceded by: Eric Kierans
- Succeeded by: Bryce Mackasey

Personal details
- Born: February 10, 1927 Montreal, Quebec
- Died: July 1, 2014 (aged 87) Montreal, Quebec
- Party: Liberal
- Spouse: Rosslyn
- Profession: lawyer

William Tetley CM QC (February 10, 1927 – July 1, 2014) was a lawyer and professor of law at McGill University in Montreal, the visiting professor of Maritime and Commercial Law at Tulane University in New Orleans, Louisiana, and a former member of the National Assembly of Quebec and Cabinet Minister.

William Tetley attended the Royal Canadian Naval College and served with the Royal Canadian Navy. He graduated from McGill University with a bachelor's degree then obtained a law degree from Université Laval. He was admitted to the Bar of Quebec in 1952, a year he also began contributing to the Montreal Star and the Montreal Gazette newspapers as a literary critic. He is also the author of books and has written a number of articles on public affairs and legal matters for Canadian, United Kingdom and American newspapers. Active in the Boy Scouts of Canada for many years, in 1969 William Tetley was awarded the Boy Scouts of Canada Medal. As well, he served the Montreal community as a board member and chairman of the city's International Branch of the YMCA.

For 18 years, William Tetley practised law becoming a partner in the prominent Montreal firm, Martineau, Walker, Allison, Beaulieu, Tetley and Phelan. He entered municipal politics and in 1965 was elected as a councillor in Mount Royal, Quebec. He gave up his seat on council after being elected to the Legislative Assembly of Quebec in a 1968 by-election as the Liberal Party's representative for Notre-Dame-de-Grâce. Following his party's victory in the 1970 provincial election, he was appointed Minister of Revenue. He served in that position between May and October when he was made Minister of Financial Institutions, Companies, Cooperatives and Consumer Protection. Re-elected in 1973, he remained in that a position until 1975. During his tenure, Tetley was responsible for the province of Quebec's first consumer protection act. In July 1975 he was appointed Minister of Public Works & Supply, holding that position until November 1976 when he retired from politics to become a professor at McGill University's faculty of law.

In 1995, William Tetley was made a Member of the Order of Canada. In December 2006, his book The October Crisis, 1970: An Insider's View was published by McGill-Queen's University Press.

An art collector, William Tetley was a member of the board of directors of the McCord Museum of Canadian History.

Rosslyn Tetley, William Tetley's lifelong companion, died on January 14, 2016, at the age of 81.

== Books ==
- International Maritime and Admiralty Law (2003)
- Maritime Liens and Claims (1985, 1998)
- International Conflict of Laws, Common, Civil and Maritime (1994)
- The October Crisis, 1970: An Insider's View (2006, ISBN 0-7735-3118-1)
- Marine Cargo Claims (1965, 1978, 1988, 2008, ISBN 978-2-89635-126-8)

== Links ==
- "Biography". Dictionnaire des parlementaires du Québec de 1792 à nos jours (in French). National Assembly of Quebec.
- McGill University Curriculum Vitae for William Tetley (English and French languages)
- "Tetley's Maritime & Admiralty Law", McGill University website
