= Canadian Party of Quebec =

Canadian Party of Quebec Parti canadien du Québec
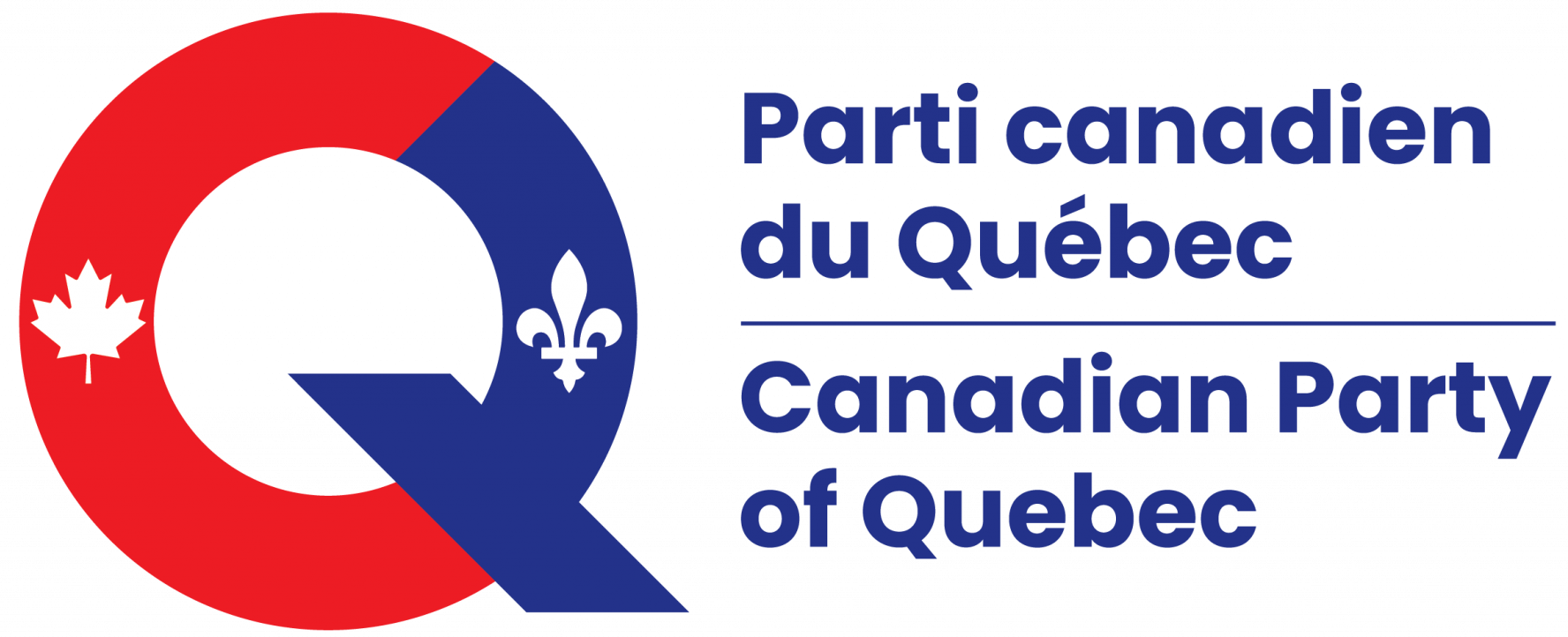
- Abbreviation: CaPQ (English); PaCQ (French)
- Leader: Joseph Cianflone
- President: Charles Roburn
- Founded: June 15, 2022
- Headquarters: Brossard, Quebec, Canada
- Ideology: Quebec federalism Official bilingualism Canadian nationalism Anglophone interests
- Political position: Centre
- Colours: Red and navy blue
- Seats in the National Assembly: 0 / 127

Website
- EN: canadianpartyquebec.ca FR: particanadienquebec.ca

The Canadian Party of Quebec (Note: French: Parti canadien du Québec, pronounced [paʁti kanadjɛ̃ dy kebɛk]) is a provincial political party in Quebec. Founded in 2022, the party advocates for federalism and deepening Quebec's ties with the rest of Canada. Its current leader is Joseph Cianflone while Charles Roburn serves as the party's president.

The core political philosophy of the Canadian Party of Quebec is what it calls "Canadian Exceptionalism"; it believes in the equality of all Canadians and the confederation between anglophone, francophone and native peoples, and opposes identity politics. The party states its mission is to defend the individual rights of the citizenry that, in its view, define the democratic tradition of Quebec and the rest of Canada; the party is dedicated to abolishing political nationalism.

The party ran 20 candidates in the 2022 Quebec general election and 29 candidates in the 2026 Quebec general election.

== Electoral results ==
Election	Leader	Candidates	Elected	Votes	%	Place
2022	Colin Standish	20 / 125	0	12,981	0.32	7th
2026	Joseph Cianflone	29 / 127	0	8,232	0.19	8th
