= Premiership of Justin Trudeau =

Period of the Government of Canada from 2015 to 2025

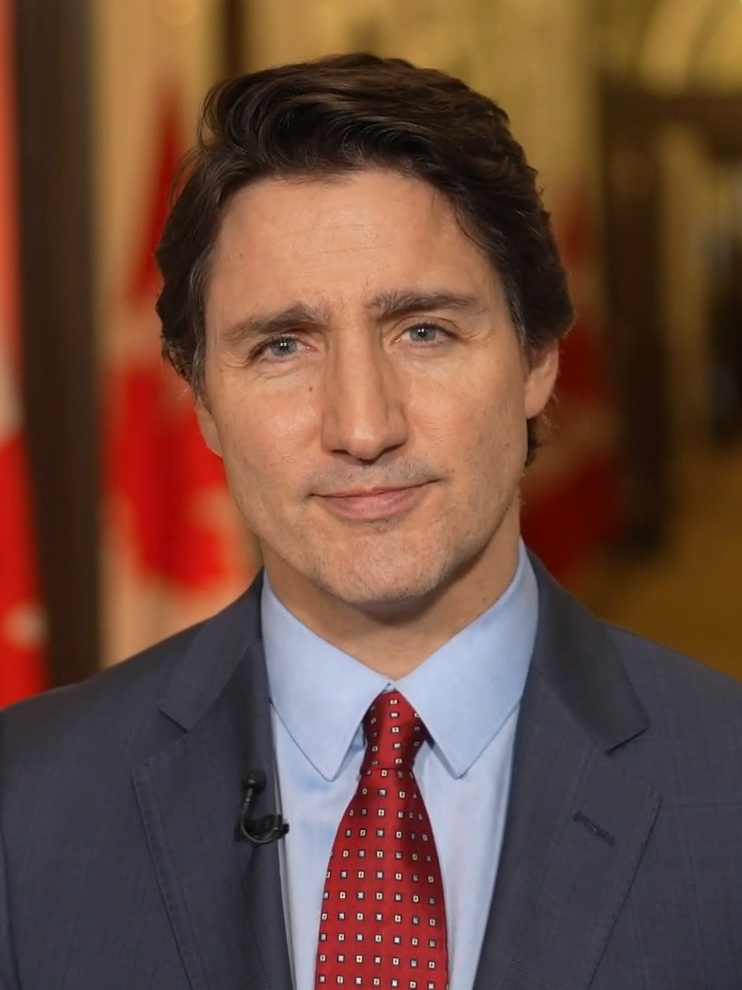
- Trudeau in 2023
- Premiership of Justin Trudeau; November 4, 2015 – March 14, 2025
- Monarchs: Elizabeth II; Charles III
- Prime Minister: Justin Trudeau
- Cabinet: 29th Canadian Ministry
- Party: Liberal
- Election: 2015; 2019; 2021
- Appointed by: David Johnston
- Seat: Office of the Prime Minister
- Constituency: Papineau

Justin Trudeau's tenure as prime minister of Canada began on November 4, 2015, when he accepted an invitation by David Johnston, the governor general of Canada, to form the 29th Canadian Ministry, succeeding Stephen Harper of the Conservative Party. Trudeau, leader of the Liberal party, led his party to victory following the 2015 federal election, where they won a majority of seats in the House of Commons of Canada, defeating the Conservative majority government. Trudeau's Liberals were reduced to minority governments in the federal elections of 2019 and 2021, with his party losing the national popular vote twice.

On March 14, 2025, Trudeau resigned as prime minister, being succeeded by Mark Carney.

== Mandates ==
Justin Trudeau's Liberal Party won the 2015 Canadian federal election with 6,943,276 votes, representing 39.47% of votes cast. In the following election in 2019, Justin Trudeau's Liberals won the most seats, but with fewer votes than Andrew Scheer's Conservative Party. The Liberals received 6,018,728 votes (33.12%) compared to the Conservatives' 6,239,227 (34.34%). In the following election in 2021, Justin Trudeau's Liberals won the most seats, but again with fewer votes than Erin O'Toole's Conservative Party. The Liberals received 5,556,629 votes (32.62%) compared to the Conservatives' 5,747,410 (33.74%).

=== 2015 federal election ===
In the federal election of October 19, 2015, the Liberal Party, led by Justin Trudeau, won 184 seats in the 42nd Canadian Parliament and formed a majority government. Trudeau and his Cabinet were sworn in on November 4, 2015. The Conservative Party, led by incumbent prime minister Stephen Harper, won 99 seats, becoming the Official Opposition. Harper had served as prime minister from 2006 to 2015. Trudeau decided to reside at Rideau Cottage rather than 24 Sussex Drive as prime minister.

=== 2019 federal election ===
In the federal election of October 21, 2019, the Liberals, led by incumbent prime minister Justin Trudeau, won 157 seats in the 43rd Canadian Parliament, losing 20 seats from 2015 and thus formed a minority government. The Conservatives, led by Andrew Scheer, won 122 seats, gaining 26 from 2015, and also won the popular vote. The Bloc Québécois, led by Yves-François Blanchet, won 32 seats, gaining 10 from 2015, and attained third-party status in the House of Commons. The New Democratic Party (NDP), under Jagmeet Singh, won 24 seats, losing 15 from 2015. The Green Party, led by Elizabeth May, won 3 seats, gaining 2 from 2015.

=== 2021 federal election ===
In the federal election of September 20, 2021, the Liberals, led by incumbent prime minister Justin Trudeau, won 160 seats in the 44th Canadian Parliament, gaining 3 seats from 2019 and thus formed another minority government. The Conservatives, led by Erin O'Toole, won 119 seats, losing 2 from 2019 and also won the popular vote. The Bloc Québécois, led by Yves-François Blanchet, won 32 seats and remained "third-party status in the House of Commons". The New Democratic Party (NDP), under Jagmeet Singh, won 25 seats, gaining 1 seat from 2019. The Green Party, led by Annamie Paul, won 2 seats, losing 1 from 2019.

== Cabinet ==
Following the November 4, 2015 Rideau Hall swearing in ceremony by Governor General David Johnston, Justin Trudeau, was invited to form his Cabinet and to become the 23rd Prime Minister of Canada. The Liberal Party, led by Trudeau, won a majority of the seats in the House of Commons of Canada, defeating the Conservative led by Prime Minister Stephen Harper. The original members of the 29th Canadian Ministry included fifteen men and fifteen women and was the first gender-balanced cabinet in Canadian history. Following the July 2018 cabinet shuffle, the cabinet consisted of 34 members with 17 women and 17 men, excluding Trudeau.

Trudeau has promised to decentralize power from the Prime Minister's Office and give Cabinet a larger role in governing, stating "government by cabinet is back".

Trudeau reshuffled his cabinet in 2018, 2019, 2021, 2023, and 2024. In 2019, Chrystia Freeland was appointed the country's deputy prime minister.

== Domestic policy ==
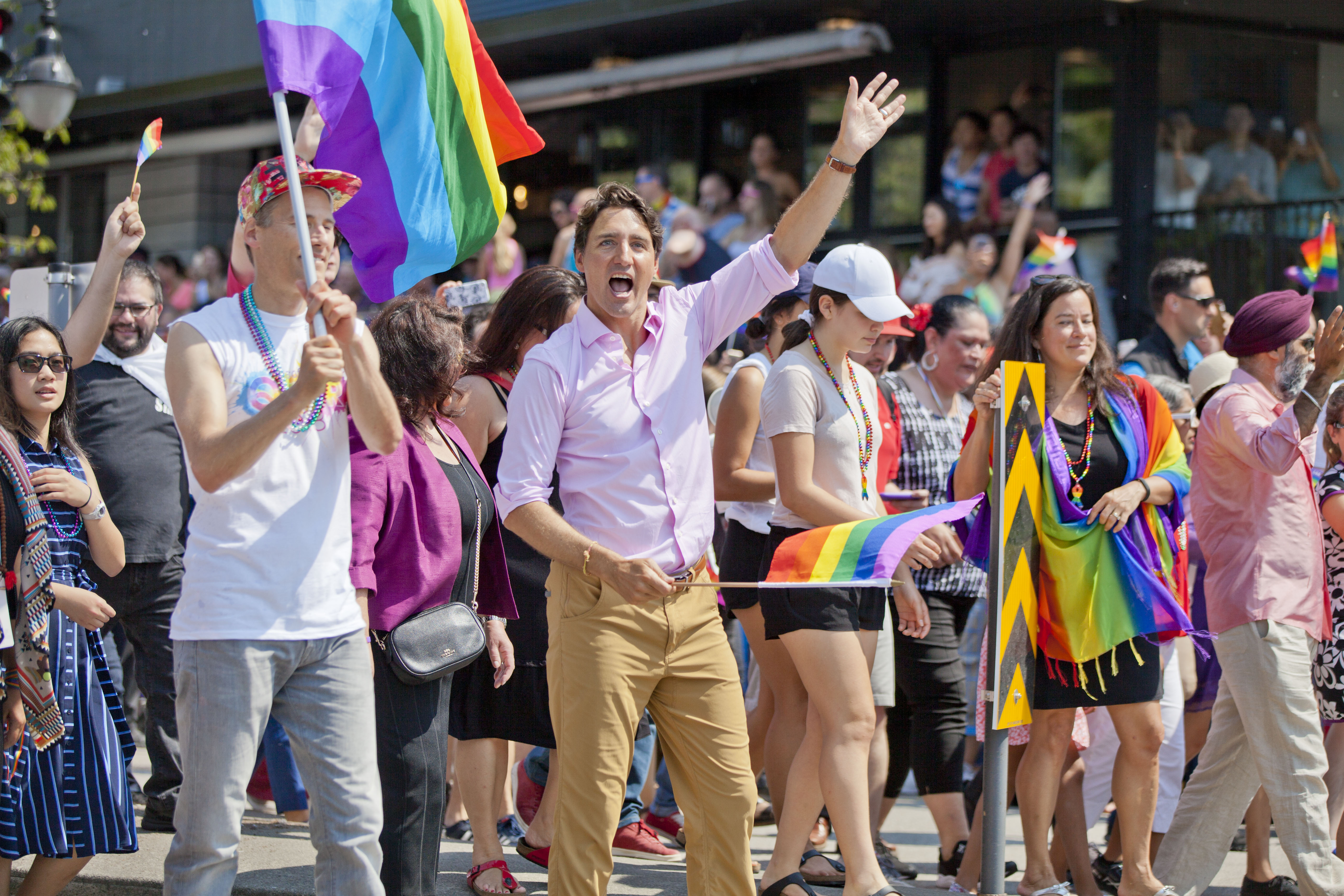
Trudeau at the Vancouver Pride Parade, August 6, 2018

The Trudeau government's economic policy relied on increased tax revenues to pay for increased government spending. While the government did not balance the budget in its first term, it purported being fiscally responsible as it reduced the country debt-to-GDP ratio every year until the year 2020, when the COVID-19 pandemic hit. Trudeau's progressive social policy included strong advocacy for feminism and abortion rights, and introduced the right to medically assisted dying. Canada also legalized cannabis for recreational use in October 2018.

On November 5, 2015, during the first Liberal caucus meeting since forming a majority government, the party announced that it would reinstate the mandatory long-form census that had been scrapped in 2010, effective with the 2016 census.

His government responded to the COVID-19 pandemic with expansive government aid programs, leading Canada to be characterized among the group of countries with the most interventionist economic policies during the period. Amidst the pandemic, he became increasingly preoccupied with addressing what he saw as the fundamental problems and social inequalities that had been laid bare by the crisis. This shift was signified by the replacement of Bill Morneau by Chrystia Freeland as finance minister, with the former hailing from the party's right flank, and the latter from the economically interventionist camp. Media commenters identified this moment as a turning point, where the government took a major turn to the left on fiscal policy. Trudeau's government would go on to establish a national childcare program, which analysts have described as the largest expansion of Canada's welfare state since the establishment of universal healthcare in the 1960s. And the implementation of a dental care program, under a confidence and supply agreement with the NDP, would expand it even further.

His environmental policy included introducing new commitments to reducing greenhouse gas emissions by 30% before 2030, and to achieve net-zero emissions by 2050. His main tool for reaching this target is a federal carbon pricing policy, which eventually became largely unpopular with the Canadian public. Trudeau's parliament also adopted legislation for marine conservation, banning single-use plastic, and strengthening environmental impact assessments. However, Trudeau is in favor of oil and gas pipelines to bring Canadian fossil fuel resources to foreign markets.

Under Trudeau, Canada set targets to welcome an increased number of immigrants and refugees. In 2024, Canada admitted 483,390 new permanent residents, including 127,320 from India.

Shortly before his resignation, Trudeau announced the Alto high speed rail project between Toronto and Quebec City.

=== Establishments ===
In July 2016, Trudeau announced the formation of the first Prime Minister's Youth Council. Thirty Canadians aged 16 to 24 comprised the board, that would advise the prime minister on education, economy, climate change, and other issues affecting youth.

In June 2017, Trudeau created the Canada Infrastructure Bank, a federal Crown Corporation of Canada tasked with financially supporting revenue-generating infrastructure projects that are "in the public interest" through public-private partnerships.

In July 2019, Trudeau established the Office of the Intelligence Commissioner of Canada as part of the National Security Act, 2017, an omnibus bill introduced by the government which reworked many of the existing mechanisms within the intelligence community in Canada, including oversight of intelligence gathering and any actions taken by intelligence agencies on behalf of the Government of Canada.

=== In Parliament ===
In 2015, his government announced a new Senate of Canada members' appointment process overseen by a new Independent Advisory Board for Senate Appointments, which was seen as an attempt to make the Senate less partisan without requiring constitutional change. The Independent Advisory Board was constituted in 2016. Members of the board include members from each jurisdiction where there is a vacancy. The board provides a short list of recommended candidates to the prime minister, who is not bound to accept them. Some provinces refused to participate, stating that it would make the situation worse by lending the Senate some legitimacy.

In 2017, Trudeau's government introduced a policy to answer all questions once a week on Wednesday during every sitting of the House of Commons, in addition to the traditional Question Period. However, the practice was discontinued in 2025 by his successor, Mark Carney.

==== Confidence and supply agreement ====
On March 22, 2022, the Liberals and the NDP entered a confidence and supply agreement. The intent of the agreement was to avert any prospective early election prior to 2025 and to allow the minority Trudeau government to stay in power for the full four-year term of the parliament in exchange for Liberals supporting certain policy priorities favored by NDP.

Among the policies included in the deal were: the establishment of a national dental care program for low-income Canadians, progress towards a national pharmacare program, labour reforms for federally regulated workers, and new taxes on financial institutions.

In early 2024, the two parties reached an impasse over pharmacare, putting the deal in jeopardy. The agreement called for the development of the Canada Pharmacare Act by the end of 2023, setting out a framework for the system; however, the NDP had agreed to extend the deadline to March 1 of the following year as negotiations became fraught. Major points of contention included the NDP's demand that the system be single-payer, as well as preliminary coverage for certain drugs prior to the implementation of the full system. On February 23, the parties reached an agreement, salvaging the deal. The agreement provided coverage for diabetes and contraceptive drugs ahead of the full program's launch.

In September 2024, the NDP pulled their support and ended the confidence and supply agreement. NDP leader Jagmeet Singh said the Liberals had "let people down" and were "too weak, too selfish and too beholden to corporate interests" to fight for people, citing discontent with the Liberals' performance on healthcare reforms and affordability measures. Trudeau stated he would continue to work for Canadians and not focus on politics.

==== No-confidence motions ====
On September 25, 2024, Trudeau survived a no-confidence vote brought by the Conservative Party, followed by another on October 1, 2024, and on December 9, 2024. On December 20, 2024, Singh pledged to put forward another no-confidence motion and vote out Trudeau's government.

=== Changes to the Parliamentary Budget Office ===
The Liberal Party's 2015 election platform committed to making the PBO "truly independent of the government" and "accountable only – and directly – to Parliament", as opposed to being under the Library of Parliament. The platform also committed to expand the PBO's mandate to include "the costing of party election platforms". These changes were included in the Budget Implementation Act, 2017 and came into force in September 2017, but also included new restrictions on the PBO.

=== Town hall meetings ===
Before the COVID-19 pandemic, Justin Trudeau would hold in-person town hall meetings around Canada. The attendees would ask him questions for around an hour and a half, and he would answer every one of them. Admission was open to everyone and the questions were not vetted.

The Commissioner of Official Language, Ghislaine Saikaley, received 60 complaints related to Prime Minister Justin Trudeau's use of English and French during these town hall meetings in early 2017. Eleven of the reports came following a session in Sherbrooke, Quebec, where Trudeau, whose father had enacted the Official Languages Act, answered in French when he was asked in English to address a lack of government-provided mental health services for English-speaking persons. Three other reports were related to Trudeau answering in English to a question asked in French while in Peterborough, Ontario. Trudeau apologized for these missteps.

=== Evaluations ===
The federal governments of Justin Trudeau and Stephen Harper fulfilled the majority of their campaign promises and scored highest on fulfilling their campaign promises compared to any other "Canadian government over the last 35 years", according to an August 30, 2019, publication based on research at Laval University. The 237-page publication, Assessing Justin Trudeau's Liberal Government. 353 promises and a mandate for change, includes the work of "two dozen Canadian academics". They found that Justin Trudeau's Liberal government kept 92 percent of pledges, when complete and partial pledges were added together, while the Harper government kept 85 percent of complete and partial pledges. When only completed, realized pledges were calculated, Harper's government, in their last year, kept 77 percent of promises while the Liberal government kept 53.5 percent. The book notes that Harper's pledges tended towards transactional pledges which target sub-populations while Trudeau's government's promises were transformative.

== Foreign policy ==
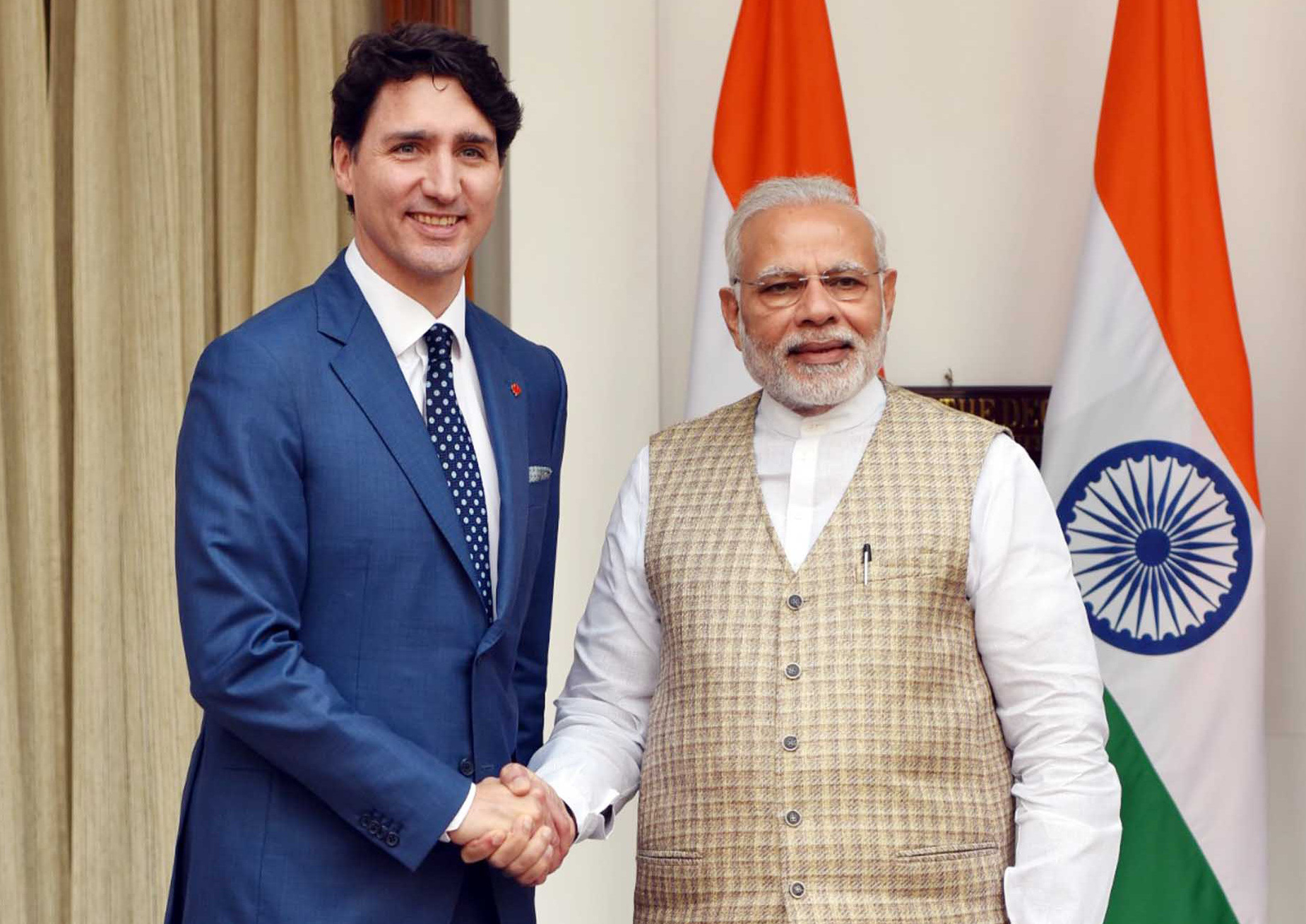
Trudeau with Indian prime minister Narendra Modi in New Delhi, February 23, 2018

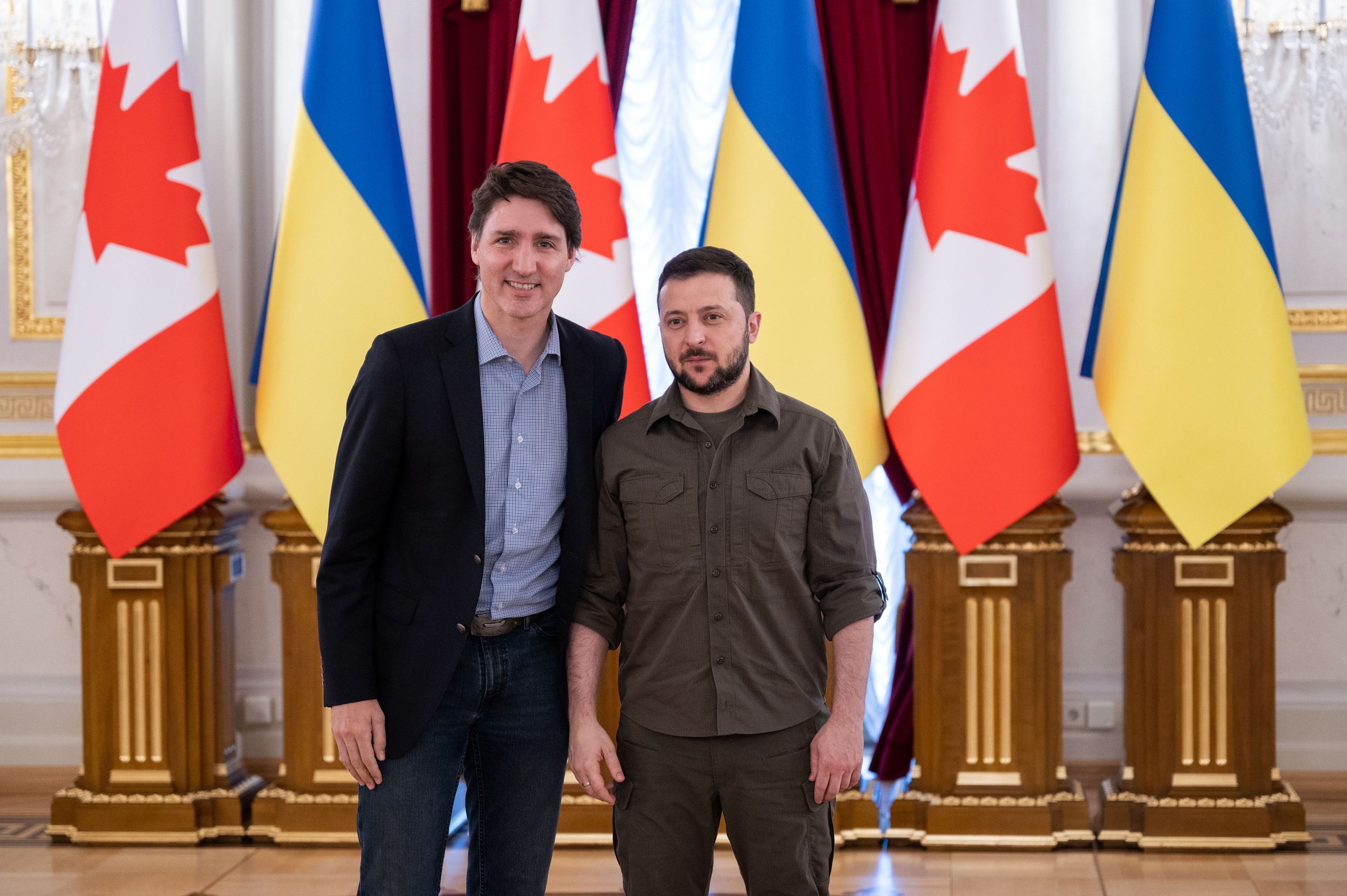
Trudeau meets with President of Ukraine Volodymyr Zelenskyy in Kyiv, May 8, 2022

Canada's Minister of Foreign Affairs was Mélanie Joly from October 2021 to May 2025. Trudeau enjoyed good relations with the United States under Democratic President Barack Obama, despite Trudeau's support for the Keystone Pipeline which was later rejected. Trudeau's first foreign policy challenges included respecting his campaign promise to withdraw Royal Canadian Air Force support from the Syrian civil war and to welcome 25,000 Syrian war refugees.

The Trudeau government signed the Arms Trade Treaty in 2019, The government also signed the Declaration on the Rights of Indigenous Peoples in 2021. In 2016 the Trudeau government promised to sign the Optional Protocol to the Convention against Torture.

Canada's relationship with the United States changed under Republican president Donald Trump. Notably, there was the renegotiation of the North American Free Trade Agreement to create the United States–Mexico–Canada Agreement, in which Canada made significant concessions in allowing increased imports of American milk, weakening Canada's dairy supply management system. President Trump also implemented tariffs on Canadian steel and aluminum, to which Trudeau retaliated by imposing tariffs on American steel, aluminum and a variety of other American products.

Canada's relationship with China also deteriorated under Justin Trudeau, beginning with the arrest of Meng Wanzhou at the Vancouver International Airport in December 2018 at the request of the United States, and the arrest of Michael Spavor and Michael Kovrig in China 12 days later. Both countries requested the release of their nationals, which they saw as political prisoners. Justin Trudeau claimed he did not have the authority to free Meng Wanzhou, as his policy was to respect Canada's extradition treaty with the United States. After over 1000 days of imprisonment, these three individuals were released at the exact same time in September 2021.

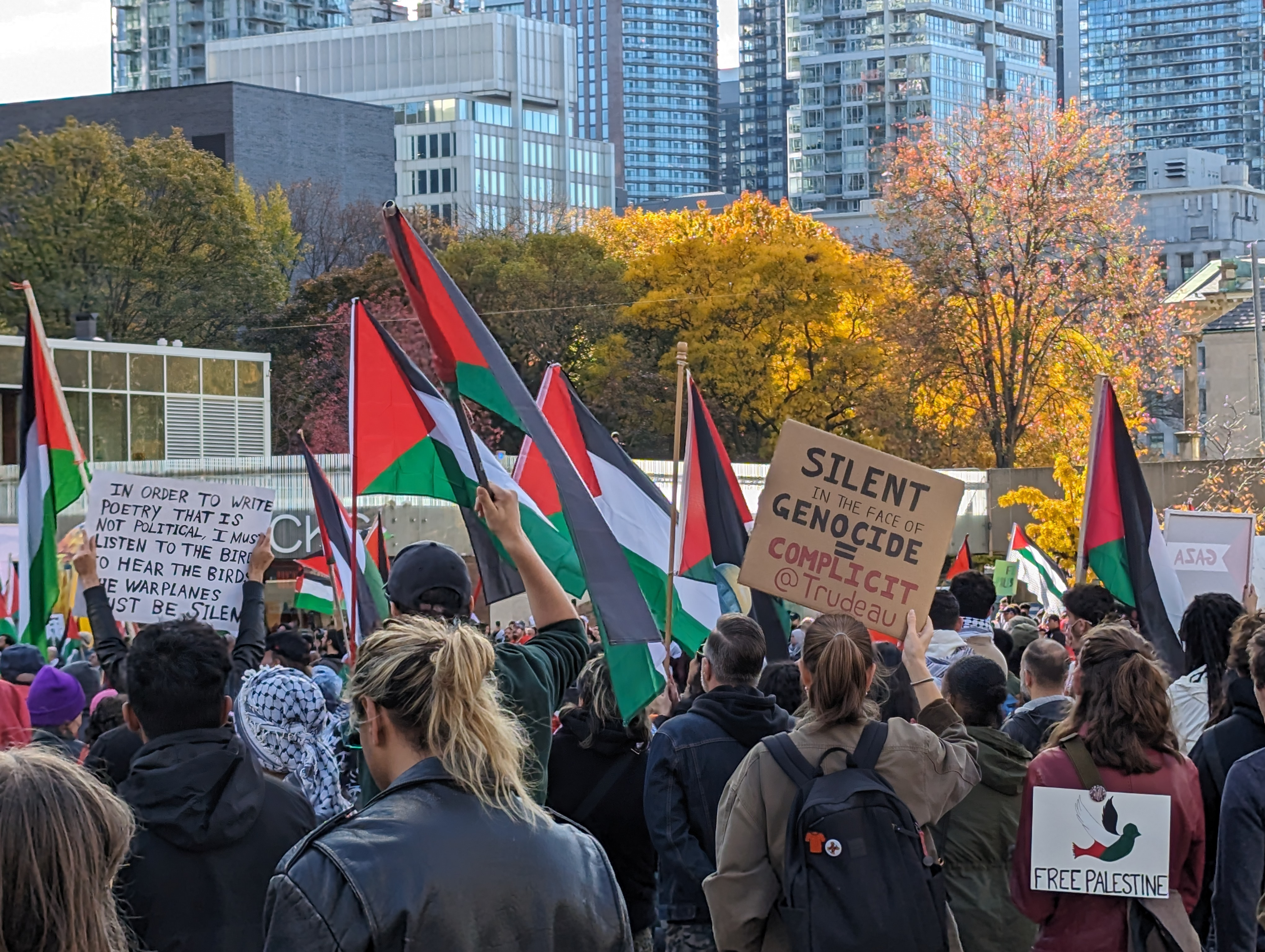
Pro-Palestinian protest in Toronto, October 28, 2023

In a similar fashion, Canada's relationship with Saudi Arabia seemed to deteriorate as Human Rights groups called on Trudeau to stop selling military equipment to that country under a deal struck by his predecessor. In 2018, Saudi Arabia recalled its Canadian ambassador and froze trade with the country after Canada had called on the Saudis to release opposition blogger Raif Badawi. However, in 2019, Canada doubled its weapons sales to Saudi Arabia, despite a "moratorium on export permits following the killing of the Saudi journalist Jamal Khashoggi and mounting civilian deaths from the Saudi Arabian-led intervention in Yemen."

In January 2019, at the request of the Office of the United Nations High Commissioner for Refugees, Canada granted asylum to 18-year-old Saudi teenager Rahaf Mohammed, who was fleeing her abusive family in Kuwait; Freeland personally greeted Mohammed at Toronto Pearson International Airport.

In 2020, Canada lost its bid to join the United Nations Security Council with the two open seats going to Ireland and Norway. This was the second time Canada failed an attempt to join the security council, the first time being in 2009 under Trudeau's predecessor Stephen Harper.

The Canada–India diplomatic row was a diplomatic dispute between Canada and India that started in September 2023, with periodic escalation throughout the following year. While the diplomatic row was initially triggered due to Canadian Prime Minister Justin Trudeau's allegations that the Indian government was involved in the assassination of the militant Hardeep Singh Nijjar, the ongoing tensions between India and Canada have been largely fuelled by disagreements over the Sikh separatist and militant Khalistan movement and its active supporters.

This led to a prolonged diplomatic stand-off between the countries. Both the countries expelled diplomatic staff, claiming interference in the other's internal affairs.

In 2023, both countries expelled members of each other's diplomatic staff and advised their citizens against traveling to the other; Canada closed three consulates in India. In October 2024, Canada expelled Sanjay Kumar Verma, the Indian High Commissioner to Canada, along with five other diplomats. India retaliated with six expulsions of its own.

Leaders of various nations released statements expressing concern on the stand-off. However, under Prime Minister Mark Carney, relations have improved and the two countries have restored diplomatic relations since 2025.

== Resignation ==
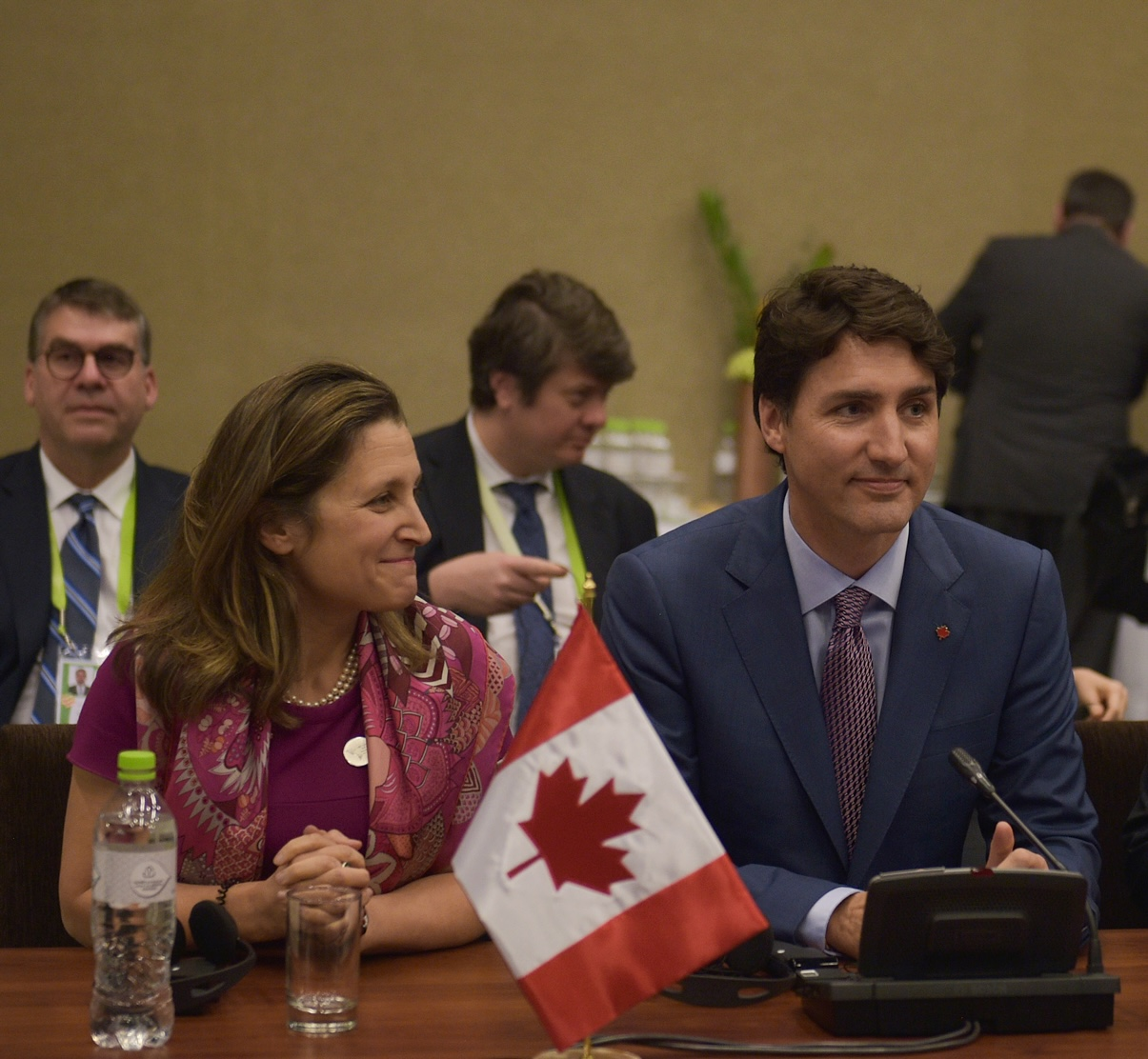
Trudeau seated next to Chrystia Freeland in 2018. Freeland's resignation from Trudeau's Cabinet in December 2024 led to the political crisis.

On December 16, 2024, Chrystia Freeland resigned as Deputy Prime Minister and Minister of Finance, hours before she was due to release the government's fall economic statement. In her resignation letter, Freeland reported Trudeau had asked her to resign as finance minister and that she would be offered another Cabinet position; she instead decided to resign altogether from his Cabinet. It was also reported that Trudeau had intended to appoint former Bank of Canada governor Mark Carney as finance minister, who ultimately declined the position. Freeland's resignation came amid threats from the incoming Trump administration to impose 25% tariffs upon Canada. It also renewed calls for his resignation emerging from Liberal MPs.

On January 6, 2025, citing "internal battles" within the Liberal Party caucus, Trudeau announced that he would tender his resignation as leader of the Liberal Party, and as prime minister of Canada after the party elects his successor. He also announced that Governor General Mary Simon would prorogue Parliament until March 24, while the party organizes and holds its next leadership election. On January 15, Trudeau subsequently confirmed he would not seek re-election in his riding of Papineau. On March 9, the Liberal Party elected Mark Carney as the new leader, with Trudeau resigning and Carney being sworn in as prime minister on March 14. The party subsequently won the 2025 Canadian federal election, overturning months of dire public opinion polling and a large lead held by the Conservative Party of Pierre Poilievre. The Liberals also took much of the NDP's support in the election.

== Scandals and controversies ==
=== Security incidents ===
Since being elected as a member of Parliament and later as prime minister, Trudeau has been the target of increasingly hostile and even violent rhetoric, primarily on social media. Authorities have responded to a number of security incidents and made arrests of several individuals who have made credible threats to his life. According to journalist Brian Busby, "the first call to kill Justin Trudeau came on October 23, four days after the 2015 election." In January 2016, a 57-year-old Ontario man was charged for allegedly threatening to kill Trudeau, his family and female MPs while aboard a Via Rail train headed to Toronto. In August 2016, a 41-year-old man from Saskatchewan was charged with uttering threats to Trudeau on Facebook, and in May 2017, another 34-year-old Saskatchewan man faced charges in connection to a separate incident of threatening Trudeau's life. In January 2018, a 52-year-old man from Medicine Hat, Alberta, pleaded guilty to making threats against Trudeau and other public officials, while another man from Alberta faced charges that same month for threatening to kill Trudeau and the premier of Alberta Rachel Notley. In February of that year charges of uttering threats were laid for a 41-year-old man from Edmonton, Alberta, while in June, a 60-year-old man from Leamington, Ontario, faced charges for contacting Trudeau's office by phone and threatening "to use an AK-47 on the prime minister" before referencing the 2014 shootings on Parliament Hill. Trudeau's wife Sophie Grégoire Trudeau was also the target of threats in May 2017 by a woman from Lethbridge, Alberta, who was placed under a restraining order, barred from attending political events, and prohibited from coming within a 100-metre radius of Grégoire Trudeau.

On February 20 and 21, 2019, a controversial event was held on Parliament Hill known as the "United We Roll" truck convoy, at which several members of the yellow vests movement shouted slogans and carried signs calling for Trudeau to be charged with "treason". Prominent political officials were criticized by anti-racism activists and fellow members of Parliament for attending the event, which was seen as lending the group legitimacy in the eyes of the government. On the second day of the two-day rally, Privy Council Clerk Michael Wernick, in his testimony regarding the SNC-Lavalin affair, raised concern over the increasing calls to violence against public officials and the Prime Minister in particular, telling the House of Commons Justice Committee that "I worry about the rising tide of incitements to violence, when people use terms like 'treason' and 'traitor' in open discourse. Those are the words that lead to assassination. I'm worried that someone is going to be shot in this country this year during the political campaign." Later that month, a 52-year-old man from Nipawin, Saskatchewan, was charged with threatening to shoot Trudeau and blow up the Parliament buildings in Ottawa. In May 2019, a man with connections to the yellow vests movement was arrested for making threats against Trudeau at a fundraising event in Mississauga, Ontario. Protesters there accused Trudeau of advancing "global communism" and again condemned him as a "traitor."

In October 2019, during the federal election campaign, a rally in Mississauga, Ontario, was delayed for 45 minutes while police fitted Trudeau with a bulletproof vest after becoming aware of an unspecified potential threat. In December 2019, two men from Quebec with links to a white nationalist group known as the Storm Alliance were arrested for alleged threats to the prime minister and to Muslim Canadians. It was not immediately clear as to whether the arrests of the two men were in connection with the security threat during the campaign. In July 2020, one of the men faced additional charges of intimidating a justice system participant and inciting genocide, after the RCMP revealed that he had made more than 100 social media posts under various pseudonyms containing hate, threats, or incitement to violence. In a statement, RCMP Corporal Charles Poirier confirmed that the justice system participant the man was accused of intimidating was Prime Minister Trudeau.

On July 2, 2020, one day after another far-right protest took place on Canada Day on the grounds of Parliament Hill, a Canadian Army Reservist from Manitoba rammed through the gates of Rideau Hall with his pick-up truck, and lurked on the grounds of the property where Trudeau and Governor-General Julie Payette have their respective residences. Neither Trudeau, his family, nor Payette were at home or on the grounds at the time. After a nearly two-hour de-escalation process, the man was taken into custody by RCMP officers working security for the estate. Though RCMP sources initially claimed that the man just wanted to "chat" with Trudeau, he eventually was served with 22 criminal charges, 21 of them firearms-related and one charge of uttering threats to the prime minister. He had four weapons on his person during the standoff, including one that had been banned by an order-in-council following the May 2020 massacre in Nova Scotia. Though initial media reports downplayed the severity of the attack, further details revealed that he had carried a note with him, and that his social media history indicated possible radicalization by far-right Internet outlets and conspiracy theories, including the QAnon phenomenon. In addition to a litany of personal struggles, the note contained accusations that Trudeau was "turning [Canada] into a communist dictatorship" and avoiding accountability by shuttering Parliament during the COVID-19 pandemic and issuing lockdown orders, which were in the interest of public health.

Reactions to the story online ranged from criticism of the media for its lack of coverage of what appeared to be an assassination attempt against the Canadian prime minister, to criticism of opposition party leaders for their initial lack of condemnation of the attack or words of support for the prime minister, his family, and the governor-general, to criticism of the RCMP for a perceived double standard in confrontation tactics towards a white person versus a person of visible minority status, to calls to have a GoFundMe campaign for the intruder's family shut down for "funding terrorism." Six days passed before any opposition leaders issued statements denouncing the attack or expressing gratitude that the prime minister, his family and the governor-general were unharmed. Asked to comment on the incident at a press conference a day after the attack, Trudeau said only that he wished to "thank the extraordinary members of the police services and the RCMP who did their job."

=== Aga Khan ===
In January 2017, Canada's Ethics Commissioner, Mary Dawson, began an investigation into Trudeau for a vacation he and his family took to Aga Khan IV's private island in the Bahamas. The Ethics Commissioner's report, released in December 2017, found that Trudeau had violated four provisions of the Conflict of Interest Act. By breaking the law, he became the first sitting prime minister to do so.

=== Elbowgate ===
Elbowgate was an incident in which Canadian prime minister Justin Trudeau came into physical contact with two opposition Members of Parliament in the House of Commons on May 18, 2016, during the parliamentary session. During the incident Trudeau grabbed Conservative MP Gord Brown by the arm and then inadvertently elbowed New Democratic MP Ruth Ellen Brosseau in the chest. Trudeau subsequently apologized and was not subject to parliamentary sanctions for the incident.

=== SNC-Lavalin affair ===
==== Background ====
On February 8, 2019, The Globe and Mail reported that sources close to the government said that the Prime Minister's Office allegedly had attempted to influence Minister Jody Wilson-Raybould concerning an ongoing prosecution of SNC-Lavalin while she was Minister of Justice and Attorney General. When asked about the allegations, Trudeau said that the story in the Globe was false and that he had never "directed" Wilson-Raybould concerning the case. Wilson-Raybould refused to comment on the matter, citing solicitor-client privilege and, on February 11, the Ethics Commissioner announced the opening of an investigation into the allegations. Trudeau welcomed the investigation, stating that "Her presence in cabinet should actually speak for itself." Wilson-Raybould resigned from the Trudeau cabinet on February 12, 2019, the next day. Trudeau said he did not anticipate her resignation and expressed disappointment over her decision, as it was not reflective of the conversations they had had during their recent meetings. Following Wilson-Raybould's resignation, Trudeau further elaborated by stating that the government abided by all rules, did its job properly, and that if anyone within the government – including the former attorney-general – felt otherwise, the responsibility lay with Wilson-Raybould to address these concerns directly to him. Trudeau refutes Wilson-Raybould's claim that this is an issue involving attorney-client privilege and mentioned that she did not approach him to discuss or highlight any concerns regarding this case. She has retained Thomas Cromwell, a former judge for the Supreme Court of Canada, as counsel in order to determine the scope of information she is allowed to share with the public. On February 18, 2019, Gerald Butts, Trudeau's principal secretary, resigned from the government and categorically denied all allegations.

==== Jody Wilson-Raybould testimony at the House of Commons Justice Committee ====
On February 27, 2019, Jody Wilson-Raybould testified in front of the House of Commons Justice Committee that "For a period of approximately four months between September and December 2018, I experienced a consistent and sustained effort by many people within the government to seek to politically interfere in the exercise of prosecutorial discretion in my role as the attorney general of Canada in an inappropriate effort to secure a Deferred Prosecution Agreement with SNC-Lavalin." She named 11 people involved with the "sustained effort" to politically interfere which include Gerald Butts, Trudeau's former principal secretary, Katie Telford, Trudeau's chief of staff, Bill Morneau, Trudeau's Minister of Finance, and many other high ranking people within the prime minister's office and the clerk of the Privy Council, Michael Wernick. She says she was promised a line of positive op-eds if she intervened in the case to say what she was doing is proper. Further, Wilson-Raybould says she received "veiled threats" while receiving the sustained pressure even after saying no previously.

Later that same day in a news conference in Quebec, Justin Trudeau said that "I completely disagree with the former attorney general's version of events," adding he had not ruled out whether she will remain a Liberal MP or be allowed to run for the party in the fall election.

==== High profile resignations ====
In the wake of the SNC-Lavalin Affair, during February 2019, Principal Secretary Gerald Butts resigned from office. In March 2019, Jody Wilson-Raybould and Jane Philpott resigned from cabinet while remaining members of the Liberal party caucus. After delivering his second testimony to the Justice Committee in March, the Clerk of the Privy Council Michael Wernick resigned from office.

==== Ethics Commissioner's report ====
Mario Dion, the Parliament of Canada's Ethics Commissioner, began an investigation in March. On August 14, 2019, he released a report that said Trudeau contravened section 9 of the Conflict of Interest Act by improperly pressuring Wilson-Raybould.

==== Polling ====
A Leger poll conducted for the Canadian Press found that 41 percent of respondents thought Trudeau had done something wrong amid the SNC scandal, while 12 percent thought he hadn't. Another 41 percent were undecided. Despite questions and criticism regarding whether his public reputation as a feminist was in doubt due to Wilson-Raybould and Philpott's alleged treatment, a later poll conducted by Innovative Research found that those most likely to dispute Trudeau's feminist credentials in the wake of the controversy were "Conservatives and populists" already opposed to Trudeau and the Liberal Party. According to the Toronto Star, 30 percent of those surveyed said Trudeau's Liberals were best-placed on gender equality issues, down from 36 percent in polling conducted before SNC but still well ahead of all other opposition parties by that measure.

=== Brownface/blackface controversy ===
On September 18, 2019, Time magazine published a photograph of Trudeau wearing brownface makeup in the spring of 2001. The photograph, which had not been previously reported, was taken at an "Arabian Nights"-themed gala. The photograph showed Trudeau, wearing a turban and robes with his face, neck and hands completely darkened. The photograph appeared in the 2000–2001 yearbook of the West Point Grey Academy, where Trudeau was a teacher. A copy of the yearbook was obtained by Time earlier in the month from Vancouver businessman Michael Adamson, who was part of the West Point Grey Academy community. Adamson said that he first saw the photograph in July and felt it should be made public.

On the night of September 18, following Time's publication of the photograph, Trudeau spoke to reporters and apologized: "I shouldn't have done that. I should have known better and I didn't. I'm really sorry." When asked if he thought the photograph was racist, he said, "Yes it was. I didn't consider it racist at the time, but now we know better." While speaking to reporters, Trudeau also admitted to wearing blackface makeup in high school while singing "Day-O" at a talent show.

On September 19, 2019, Global News obtained and published a video from the early 1990s showing Trudeau in blackface. The video showed Trudeau covered in dark makeup and raising his hands in the air while laughing, sticking his tongue out and making faces. The video showed his arms and legs covered in makeup as well.

=== Bombardier ===
Trudeau's government provided a CA$372.5 million bailout to Bombardier in February 2017. It was later revealed that Bombardier executives received US$32 million of these funds in bonuses, while laying off 14,500 workers around the world that year. Patrick Pichette, a director of Bombardier Inc., sits as a board member of the Trudeau Foundation.

=== WE Charity ethics investigation ===
Following complaints by opposition parties that the Trudeau family had ties to WE Charity, the ethics commissioner on July 3, 2020, announced an investigation into Trudeau's and the government's decision to have the charity administer a summer, student-grant program which could assist students financially during the COVID-19 pandemic. Trudeau responded by saying WE was the charity that had the capability to administer such a program. WE and the federal government decided to "part ways" leaving administration of the grant program to the federal government.

We Charity was criticized for its close ties to the Trudeau family; the investigation came after revelations that Trudeau's mother, brother, and wife were paid nearly $300,000 in total to speak at WE Charity events. On July 16, 2020, the ethics commissioner also announced the investigation was being expanded to include Finance Minister Bill Morneau.

=== Appointment and resignation of Julie Payette ===
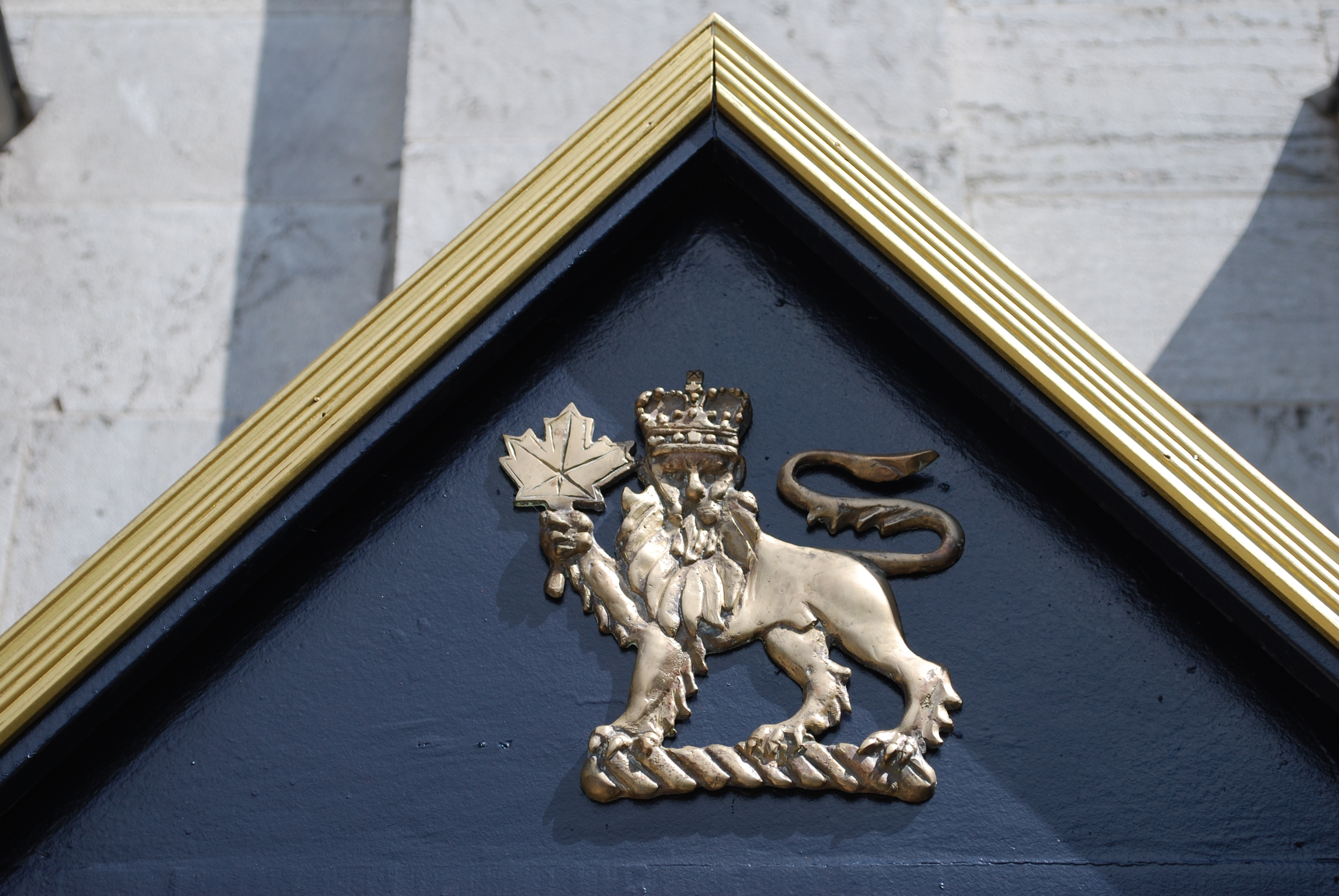
The vice regal badge seen outside of Rideau Hall

On July 13, 2017, Trudeau announced his recommendation of Julie Payette to succeed David Johnston as the 29th governor general of Canada. Payette was formally appointed by Queen Elizabeth II on October 2, 2017. The role of the governor general is to represent the monarch of Canada, Queen Elizabeth II when she is not in the country and includes granting royal assent to legislation passed by Parliament, and dissolving Parliament for an election on the advice of the prime minister. Trudeau's method of selection for the role was criticized for failing to appropriately vet candidates, as the Advisory Committee on Vice-Regal Appointments established in 2012, was left dormant following Trudeau taking office in 2015.

In 2020, allegations surfaced that Rideau Hall staff faced harassment and verbal abuse by the governor general and her secretary, leading to the Privy Council Office initiating a review of the workplace culture.

During the investigation, CBC News reported that the prime minister's office failed to conduct checks with Payette's previous employers prior to her appointment as governor general. Sources who previously worked with Payette describe similar experiences. As well as revealing previous departures from the Montreal Science Centre in 2016 and Canadian Olympic Committee in 2017 following complaints and investigations into similar matters.

Following the review on January 21, 2021, Payette and her secretary resigned from their roles, with Chief Justice Richard Wagner service as administrator of Canada in the interim.

=== Sexual misconduct controversies ===
==== Groping allegation ====
In June 2018, Trudeau critic Warren Kinsella tweeted a picture of a 2000 local newspaper editorial that noted Trudeau had inappropriately "handled" a female journalist at a music festival in Creston, British Columbia, when he was 28 years old. The editorial states that Trudeau apologized for the incident, and said "If I had known you were reporting for a national paper I never would have been so forward." Kinsella added the MeToo hashtag in the tweet.

When asked about the incident, Prime Minister Trudeau responded to the allegation by saying he doesn't recall "any negative interactions that day at all." The author of the 2000 editorial declined to talk to journalists about the allegation, as she considered the matter closed.

==== Jonathan Vance ====
Jonathan Vance served as chief of the defence staff of the Canadian Armed Forces under Prime Minister Justin Trudeau until Vance announced his retirement in mid-2020. He formally left the position after the change of command ceremony held on January 14, 2021.

In February 2021, a report emerged detailing inappropriate behaviour from Vance towards two female subordinates, possibly violating "directives that govern personal relationships and such actions might contravene provisions in the National Defence Act (NDA) that relate to good order and discipline."

Following the allegations, an investigation into Vance's conduct was launched by the Canadian Forces National Investigation Service, a unit of the Military Police. Additionally, the House of Commons defence committee voted to study the matter, and the Department of National Defence committed to an external probe into Vance, which has since expanded to "also deal with rising concerns that the issue of sexual misconduct by the senior ranks could be a systemic issue in the Canadian Armed Forces".

In May 2021, it came to light that Minister of National Defence Harjit Sajjan and the prime minister's chief of staff, Katie Telford, knew of the sexual misconduct allegations Vance faced in 2018 but that no action was taken in response. Telford responded that she did not know of the content of the allegation but that "there was a possibility that it could be that, that it could be a sexual allegation, and so that's why we were taking it so seriously at the beginning".

=== China election interference ===
In 2022 and 2023, Canadian media reports alleged that the People's Republic of China had made attempts to interfere in the 2019 Canadian federal election and 2021 Canadian federal election and threatened Canadian politicians. In late 2022, the Global News television network reported on a suspected attempt by the People's Republic of China to infiltrate the Parliament of Canada by funding a network of candidates to run in the 2019 Canadian federal election. In early 2023, The Globe and Mail newspaper published a series of articles reporting that the Canadian Security Intelligence Service (CSIS), in several classified documents, advised that China's Ministry of State Security (MSS) and United Front Work Department had employed disinformation campaigns and undisclosed donations to support preferred candidates during the 2021 Canadian federal election, with the aim of ensuring that the Liberals would win again, but only with a minority.

Canadian opposition political parties demanded a public inquiry into what they called failures by the Canadian government of Justin Trudeau to warn parliamentarians of China's activities, notify parliamentarians whom China had targeted, and further protect Canadian democratic procedures. In May 2023, the Canadian government expelled Chinese diplomat Zhao Wei, accused of intimidating a Canadian politician. Rejecting a full public inquiry, Trudeau nominated former Governor General of Canada David Johnston to investigate the allegations. Johnston filed an interim report in May 2023. In his report, he described China's interference as a danger to Canadian democracy, stated that some of the media reports were partially incorrect, and that the Canadian intelligence services and Canadian government needed to make several improvements to counter the threat and protect members of Parliament. While several opposition political parties had called for a full-scale judicial inquiry into the allegations, Johnston recommended against this, stating that the intelligence information is considered "top secret" and could not be discussed in a fully-open inquiry. Johnston intended to continue his inquiry with public hearings and a final report in October 2023, but instead resigned as the special rapporteur on June 9.

Following Johnston's resignation, Trudeau tasked Intergovernmental Affairs minister Dominic LeBlanc with negotiating with opposition parties to discuss the possibility public inquiry on the issue. In September 2023, Justin Trudeau commissioned Québec justice Marie-Josée Hogue to preside the Public Inquiry into Foreign Interference in Federal Electoral Processes and Democratic Institutions. Her mandate includes investigation foreign interference not just from China, but also from other states deemed hostile to Canada, such as Russia.

== Opinion polling ==
=== 42nd Parliament ===
From the 2015 election until the end of 2017, Justin Trudeau's Liberals led in public opinion polls. In 2018, the Conservatives and Liberals exchanged leads in opinion polls. At the beginning of 2019, the Conservatives took the lead following the SNC-Lavalin affair, but polls returned to a tie during the summer and until the election in October 2019.

=== 43rd Parliament ===
Following the 2019 election, polls tied the Liberals and the Conservatives until the onset of the COVID-19 pandemic in March 2020, after which Trudeau's Liberals took a large lead. However, after the 2021 snap election was called, the Liberals large lead evaporated and the party went back to being neck and neck with the Conservatives for the rest of the election cycle.

=== 44th Parliament ===
After the 2021 election, the Liberals briefly held a modest lead. However, as 2022 progressed, that modest lead switched over to the Conservatives, who on average held that lead for most of the rest of the year. In the summer of 2023, the Conservatives began to open up a large 20-point lead over the Liberals, which stayed mostly consistent throughout the rest of the year and into 2024.

Throughout 2024, the Conservatives' large lead on average held steady. The latter part of the year, however, saw the Liberals' support tumble even further, particularly after the events of Donald Trump's re-election as President of the United States in November and his subsequent threat of 25% tariffs on Canada, and the resignation of his Deputy Prime Minister and Finance Minister Chrystia Freeland in mid-December. Several pollsters began writing off the Liberals at this point, as the Conservatives' lead would have translated into a decisive victory if repeated at an election. In some polls, the Liberals were fighting for second place with the NDP in the popular vote and for second place with the Bloc Québécois in the parliamentary seat count. However, in the 2025 election, the Liberal Party under Mark Carney won a fourth term in office after a large upswing in polling numbers following Trudeau's resignation.

=== Approval rating ===
According to Angus Reid Institute polling, from his election in October 2015 until the fall of 2017, Justin Trudeau had a positive approval rating. December 2017 was the first time his approval rating fell into the negatives, and it largely remained this way until the COVID-19 pandemic in April 2020, at which point it returned to the positive. His approval returned to the negatives on the onset of the WE Charity scandal, and ticked back up when Canada's mass-vaccination campaign started in December 2020. However, his approval rating returned to the negatives since 2023 due to his government's widespread unpopularity. However, weeks before his resignation, Trudeau and his government's popularity saw an increase, mostly due to his response to Trump's threats of tariffs and annexation.

== Appointments ==
Trudeau's Prime Minister's Office was led by chief of staff Katie Telford for his entire tenure. He advised the appointments of several provincial and territorial lieutenant governors, with Julie Payette and Mary Simon becoming governor general under his premiership in 2017 and 2021, respectively. Trudeau also appointed several deputy ministers and other bureaucratic staff, including clerks of the Privy Council Michael Wernick, Ian Shugart, and John Hannaford. In addition, he appointed Peter Harder and Marc Gold to serve as the Representative of the Government in the Senate. Diplomatically, Trudeau's notable appointments include John Horgan to Germany, Dennis King to Ireland, David MacNaughton to the United States, Ralph Goodale to the United Kingdom, Bob Rae to the United Nations, John McCallum to China, Stéphane Dion to Germany, France, and Monaco, Kirsten Hillman to the United States, and Carolyn Bennett to Denmark. In 2022, Stephanie Cadieux was appointed as Canada's first chief accessibility officer. In January 2023, Amira Elghawaby was appointed as Canada's first Special Representative on Combatting Islamophobia, with a mandate to advise the federal government and support efforts to address anti-Muslim hate.

=== Officers of Parliament ===
List of Officers of Parliament nominated by Justin Trudeau
| Office | Nominee | Assumed office |
|---|---|---|
| Auditor General | Sylvain Ricard (interim) | March 29, 2019 |
| Auditor General | Karen Hogan | June 3, 2020 |
| Chief Electoral Officer | Stéphane Perrault | December 28, 2016 (interim) |
| Chief Electoral Officer | Stéphane Perrault | June 8, 2018 |
| Commissioner of Lobbying | Nancy Bélanger | December 14, 2017 |
| Commissioner of Official Languages | Ghislaine Saikaley (Interim) | December 19, 2016 |
| Commissioner of Official Languages | Madeleine Meilleur (withdrew) | N/A |
| Commissioner of Official Languages | Raymond Théberge | January 29, 2018 |
| Ethics Commissioner | Mario Dion | January 8, 2018 |
| Information Commissioner | Caroline Maynard | March 1, 2018 |
| Intelligence Commissioner | Jean-Pierre Plouffe | July 12, 2019 |
| Parliamentary Budget Officer | Yves Giroux | September 3, 2018 |
| Privacy Commissioner | Philippe Dufresne | June 27, 2022 |

== See also ==
- Premierships of Pierre Trudeau
- Premiership of Jean Chrétien
- Premiership of Paul Martin
- Premiership of Stephen Harper
- Premiership of Mark Carney

Canadian federal premierships
| Preceded by Stephen Harper | Justin Trudeau; 2015–2025 | Succeeded by Mark Carney |
