= Award of Excellence – Promotion of Linguistic Duality =

The Award of Excellence – Promotion of Linguistic Duality (also called the Award of Excellence for the Promotion of Linguistic Duality) is given annually by Canada's Commissioner of Official Languages. It is given to groups or individuals which are not bound to the Official Languages Act, but whose leadership helped promote Canadian Linguistic Duality, in Canada or abroad, or helped the development of Official Language Minority Communities. The prize was first awarded in 2009 by Commissioner Graham Fraser, and its first recipient was Linda Leith.

== Recipients ==
Recipients of the Award of Excellence – Promotion of Linguistic Duality
Year	Recipient	Commissioner
2009	(Quebec) Linda Leith	Graham Fraser
2010	(Ontario) Claudette Paquin	Graham Fraser
2011	(Manitoba) Festival du voyageur	Graham Fraser
2012	(Quebec) Bernard St-Laurent	Graham Fraser
2013	(Ontario) Justin Morrow	Graham Fraser
2014	(New Brunswick) The Frye Festival	Graham Fraser
2015	(Manitoba) Mariette Mulaire	Graham Fraser
2016	(Canada) Canadian Parents for French	Graham Fraser

The prize was not awarded in 2017 because there was no permanent Commissioner of Official Languages in office that year. Raymond Théberge has not awarded the prize since the beginning of his tenure as Commissioner in January 2018.
