= Festival du Voyageur =

Winter festival in Winnipeg, Manitoba, Canada

- Status: Active
- Genre: Winter festival
- Date: 10 days in February
- Frequency: Annually
- Venue: Voyageur Park
- Locations: Whittier Park, Winnipeg, Manitoba, Canada
- Years active: 57
- Inaugurated: 1970
- Attendance: 70,051 (2026)
- Budget: $3.6m (2025)
- Filing status: Non-profit
- Website: heho.ca/en

The Festival du Voyageur is an annual 10-day winter festival that takes place in Winnipeg, Manitoba, Canada. The event is held each February in Winnipeg's French quarter, Saint-Boniface, and is western Canada's largest winter festival. It celebrates Canada's fur-trading past and unique French heritage and culture through entertainment, arts and crafts, music, exhibits, and displays.

The word "Voyageur" refers to those who worked for a fur-trading company and usually travelled by canoe. In the case of Festival du Voyageur, the title of "Official Voyageur" is given to ambassadors of the festival.

== History ==
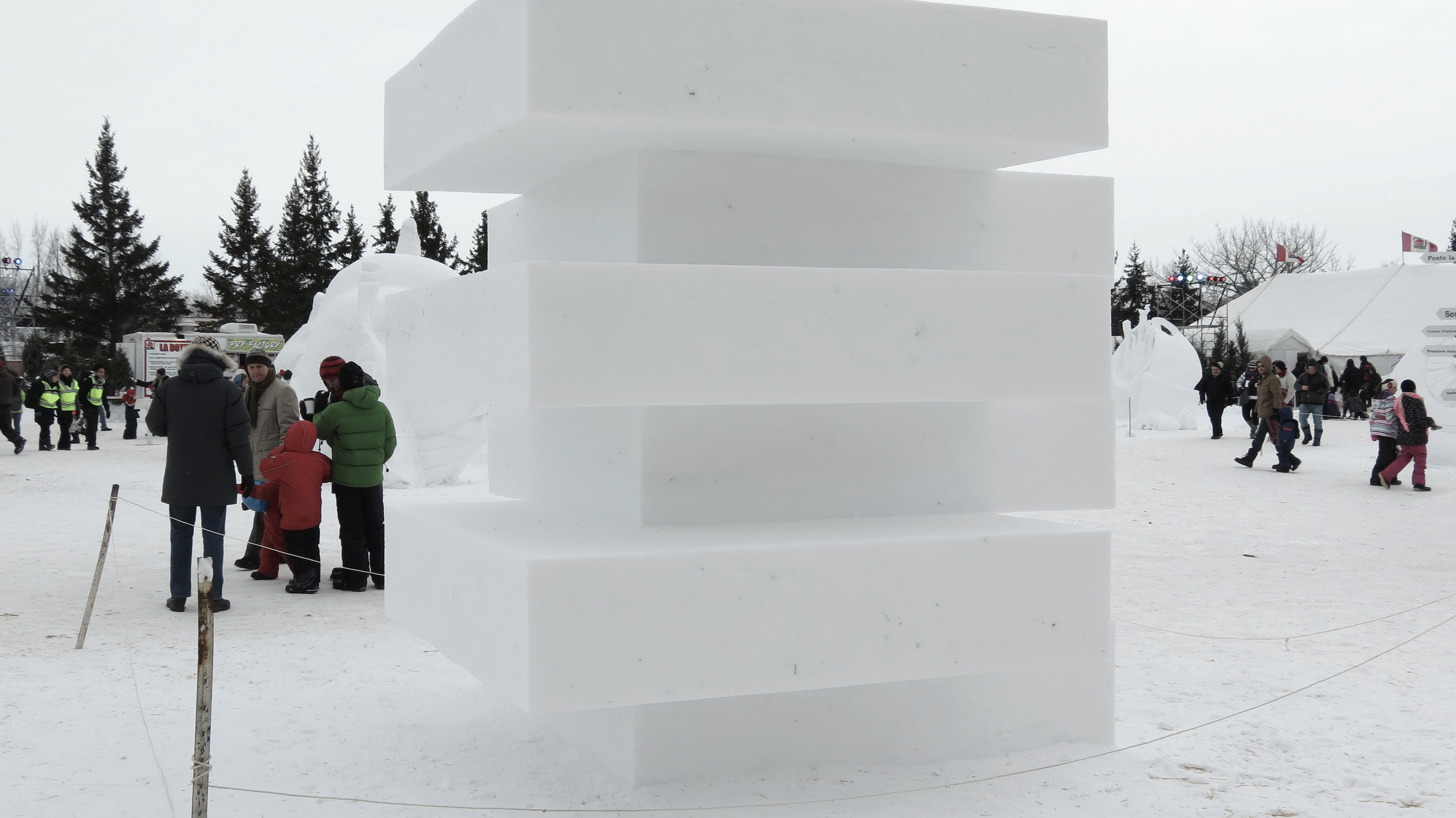
Snow sculpture at Festival du Voyageur, with the Fort Gibraltar in the background.

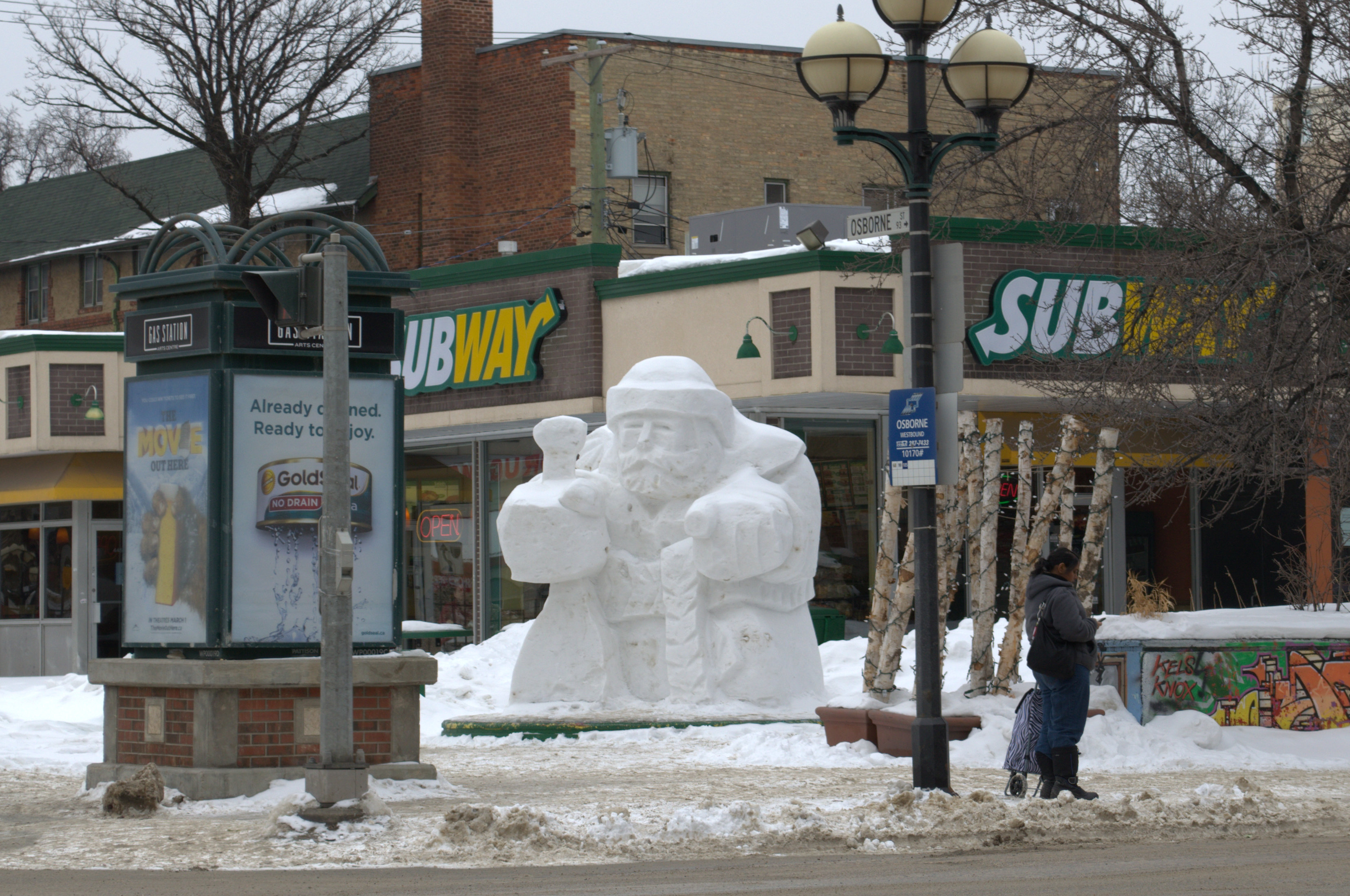
Snow sculpture from Festival 2013

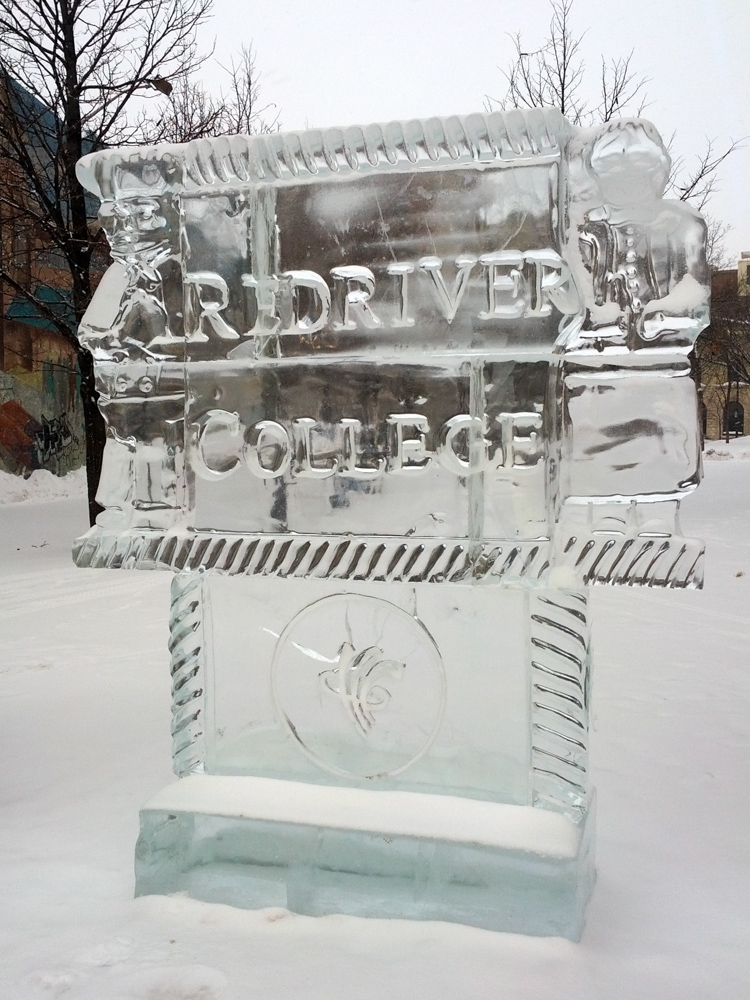
Ice sculpture for Red River College in the Exchange District from Festival 2014

The idea for a winter festival to celebrate Manitoba's Francophonie was first proposed in 1967 by Georges Forest, who became the first official "Voyageur". The proposal was put forth to the then-City of St. Boniface, but the city's offer was insufficient.

In the summer of 1969, mayor of St. Boniface Ed Turner, along with city council, granted their support under the condition that Festival became an incorporated organization. Judge Robert Trudel became the first president of Festival du Voyageur. Festival du Voyageur Inc. was incorporated under the Companies Act of Manitoba on December 18, 1969. It received a city grant of $35,000 but had to give back all profits up to $35,000.

At a press conference held on January 13, 1970, mayor Turner announced that the city of Saint-Boniface would present a festival honouring the Voyageur of the fur-trading era, in celebration of Manitoba's centennial. The first Festival du Voyageur took place that year from February 26 to March 1, at Provencher Park, with an estimated attendance of 50,000 people. Acting as an 'ambassador' for the event, Georges Forest promoted the event by wearing clothing that represented the Voyageurs. This initiated the tradition of "Official Voyageurs", which continues to this day. The 1970 festival lasted four days and featured the walk down Provencher Boulevard, the Governor's Bal, and the Voyageur Trading Post.

A large number of attendees required an unforeseen level of expenditure by festival organizers; by the festival's conclusion, the organization had debt in excess of $40,000. To remedy their financial situation, the organizers held horse races as a fundraiser in conjunction with the 1971 festival. The 1971 festival was a success, drawing nearly 200,000 guests. However, instead of resolving the financial situation, the fundraiser pushed the organization further into debt.

The snow sculpture that won the 1971 event was of a pair of boots and a toque. This sculpture inspired the creation of a mascot, Léo La Tuque, who was introduced in 1972 and became the trademark of Festival du Voyageur.

Grants from the city of Winnipeg and the Secretary of State allowed the Festival to make arrangements with their creditors. The name was changed to "Festival du Voyageur" (the "of the" was dropped). For the 1972 festival, Arthur D'Eschambault was elected president. He hired a number of financial and management directors (most of whom were anglophone). The festival ran from February 21 to 27, and the profits amounted to $108.46.

Two "school" voyageurs were appointed in 1977, to visit schools and teach children about the voyageurs and Festival.

In 1977, construction began on wooden log cabins in Whittier Park to accommodate the festival. The log cabins were constructed to be left there year-round. In 1978, the organization had accumulated enough surplus funds to make Whittier Park the permanent site of the festival. Provencher Park had become too small for the growing number of attendees. These cabins formed the foundation of the historic reconstruction that became known as Fort Gibraltar.

In 1981, the Festival du Voyageur purchased an empty warehouse, located at 768 Taché Avenue, for administrative offices and to be used for an additional venue. The building became known as the Rendez-Vous and eventually came to include a bar named Le Canot.

From February to October 2001, a large house was constructed in Fort Gibraltar for the event. The house is called the Maison du Bourgeois.

The Rendez-Vous building on Taché was put up for sale in 2003, and sold in 2006. New administrative offices were found in a building at 233 Provencher Avenue, and it came to also feature a store called the Boutique du voyageur.

In 2005, a year-round interpretive centre was built in Fort Gibraltar.

In 2011, The Festival was awarded the Award of Excellence – Promotion of Linguistic Duality by the Commissioner of Official Languages Graham Fraser for its contribution to the vitality of the Franco-Manitoban Community.

In 2021, due to the COVID-19 pandemic, Festival du Voyageur offered virtual programming and broadcast its concert events over YouTube and Facebook.

=== Attendance ===
Year	Attendance
2026	70,051
2025	67,380
2024	74,975
2023	76,000
2022	16,470
2021	Virtual only
2020	73,675
2019	96,000
2018	93,400
2017	94,000
2016	102,000
2015	91,000
2014	100,000
2013	97,000
2012	95,000
2011	97,000

== Current operation ==
In 2025, the festival saw volunteers donate 12,946 hours of work.

The festival employs around 10 permanent staff and employs approximately 200 temporary staff during the February event. In 2025, the festival's expenses were approximately $3.6m.

In 2025, 181 artists were on 7 stages for a total of 282 hours of performance.

=== Sponsors and Partners ===
As of January 2026, organizations affiliated with the Festival du Voyageur include:

- Official partners: Air Canada, Bell MTS, Assiniboine Credit Union, Canada Life, Fairmont, Manitoba Liquor & Lotteries, Nonsuch Brewing, and SiriusXM.
- Premier sponsors: Payworks, Red River Co-op, Prairie Mobile Communications, and Université de Saint-Boniface.
- Major sponsors: Alberta Pure, Brio Insurance, Canadian Club, Canadian Parents for French, Franco-Manitoban Cultural Centre, Cerberus Security, CN Rail, Conseil jeunesse provincial (“Provincial Youth Council”), Enns Brothers, Firewood Manitoba, Go RV Winnipeg, Greenwoods Dental, Industrial Metals, International Fur Dressers & Dyers, Johnson Group, Manitoba Film & Music, MB Live, Premier Tyndall, Qualico, Recycle Everywhere, Compassion Network, Francophone Society of Manitoba, and Windy Day Woodworks.
- Media sponsors: ALT 94.3, BOUNCE 99.9, CTV, Envol 91 FM, Golden West Broadcasting, La Liberté, NCI FM, QX104, Ici Radio-Canada Première, Winnipeg Free Press, and Virgin Radio.
- "Friends of Festival:" 100 Nons, Anvil Tree, Avenir IT, Country John's Portable Toilet Rentals, Dead Horse Cider, Continuing Education (USB), Éducatrices et éducateurs Francophones du Manitoba, Efficiency Manitoba, Falcon Ridge Ski, Fireball, Fort Group, Hub International, Legal Locksmith, Maxim Truck & Trailer, Ocean Trailer, Patent 5, Peg-City Co-op, PepsiCo, plain bicycle, Prism Kombucha, Royal Canadian Mint, Showpass, TDS Law, Tétrault Wealth, WETT Sales, Winnipeg Airports Authority, and Winnipeg Trails Association.
- Funders: Governments of Canada, Manitoba, and Winnipeg; FrancoFonds; Musicaction; Winnipeg Arts Council; and The Winnipeg Foundation.

== See also ==
- Coureur des bois
