= Théberge =

Théberge or Theberge is a surname. Notable people with the surname include:

- Carole Théberge (born 1953), marketer and politician from Quebec
- Greg Theberge (born 1959), Canadian ice hockey player
- James Daniel Theberge (born 1930), American diplomat
- Raymond Théberge (born 1952), Canadian civil servant
- Robert Theberge, American politician

== Other ==
- Théberge v. Galerie d'Art du Petit Champlain Inc., a Supreme Court of Canada case on copyright
- 16212 Theberge (2000 CB84), a main-belt asteroid discovered in 2000
