= Frye Festival =

Annual literary festival

Coordinates: 46.0886°N 64.7746°W

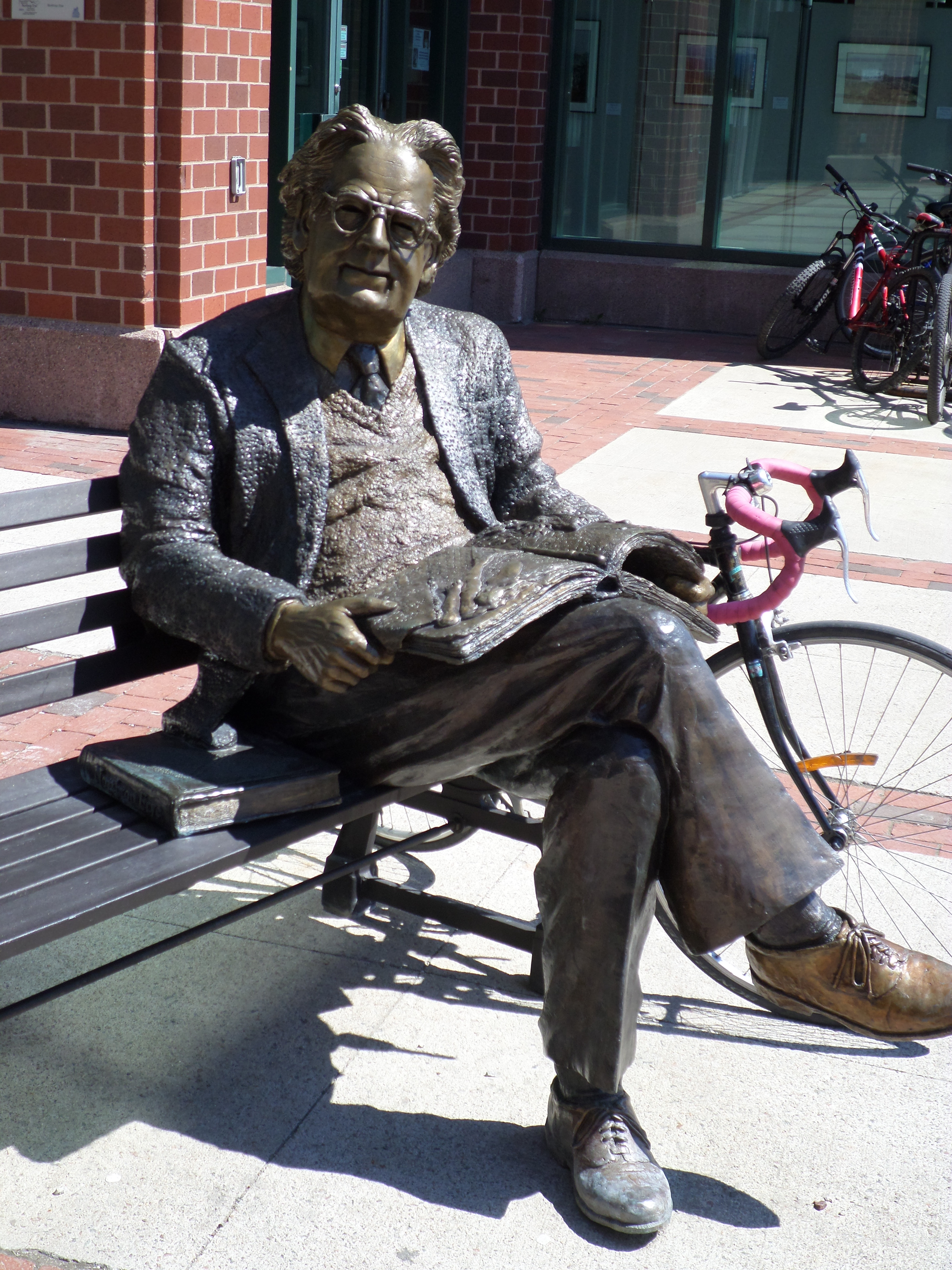
Northrop Frye statue at the Moncton Public Library

The Frye Festival, formerly known as the Northrop Frye International Literary Festival, is a bilingual (French and English) literary festival held in Moncton, New Brunswick, Canada in April of each year. The festival began in 1999 and honours noted literary critic Herman Northrop Frye (1912–1991), who spent his formative years in Moncton, graduating from Aberdeen High School.

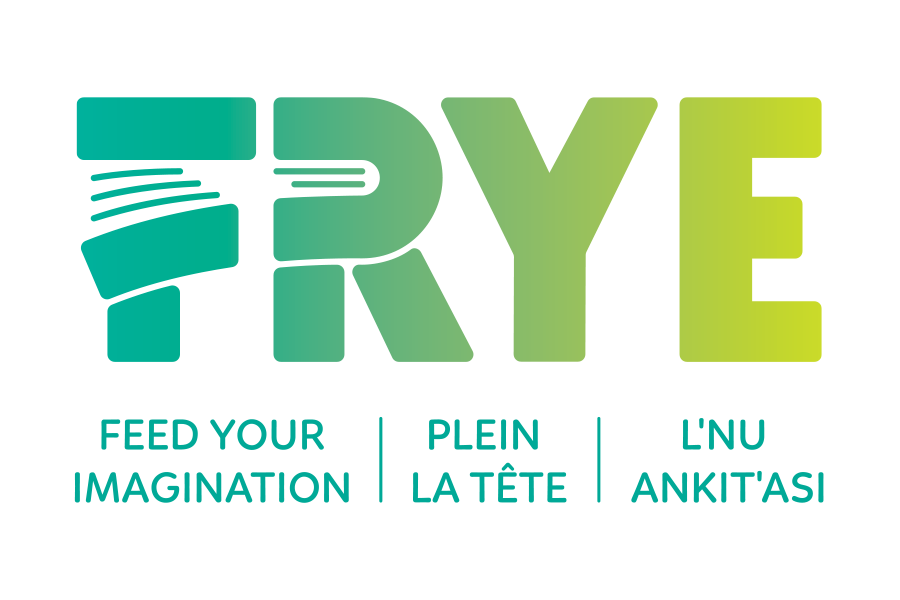
Frye Festival logo as of September 2021

== History ==
Although born in Sherbrooke, Quebec, Northrop Frye was seven years old when his family moved to Moncton, New Brunswick. He became an accomplished author and was elected to the Royal Society of Canada in 1951.

He was named University Professor by the University of Toronto in 1967 and was Norton professor at Harvard University.

In November 1990, at the invitation of Professor Serge Morin, Northrop Frye returned to Moncton to deliver the Pascal Poirier Lecture at the Université de Moncton. During his stay he had the chance to meet and talk with many Monctonians, and he was able to visit his old home and the grave of his mother in Elmwood Cemetery. "They were two of the best days of my life," he reported to fellow Monctonian, Reuben Cohen. The following year, after Frye's death in January 1991, The Northrop Frye Society hosted a gathering of Frye-ites, and John Ayre, Frye's biographer, delivered the Pascal Poirier Lecture.

In 1997 the City of Moncton, developed an Arts Policy which recommended that the city have a festival to honour Northrop Frye.

The Frye Festival was founded by three partners from the Greater Moncton region: the Aberdeen Cultural Centre, the Northrop Frye Society, and the Greater Moncton Economic Commission.

In December 1999, a public conference featuring two Canadian literary superstars, Antonine Maillet and John Ralston Saul, was organized at the Capitol Theatre by the Greater Moncton Economic Commission, Vision TV, and the Aberdeen Cultural Centre. This project became the catalyst for the creation of the Festival.

The first edition of the festival, known as the time as the Northrop Frye International Literary Festival, took place in 2000.

In its first year more than 3,000 people attended the Festival. In 2011 more than 15,000 people attended. The Frye Festival has become one of the major literary events in Canada, and continues to grow every year. More than 450 award-winning authors, from every continent and recipients of almost every major international literary prize, have now attended the Festival. The Festival is the proud recipient of the 2005 Lieutenant-Governor's Dialogue Award, the 2007 Éloize for Event of the Year, the 2009 TD Canada Trust Arts Organization of the Year by the New Brunswick Foundation for the Arts, and the 2014 Commissioner of Official Language's Award of Excellence—Promotion of Linguistic Duality.

The Frye Festival is the largest literary happening in Atlantic Canada.

== Awards ==
Throughout the years, the Frye Festival has received many awards:

- New Brunswick Lieutenant-Governor’s Dialogue Award (2005)
- Éloizes Event of the Year Award (2008, with another nomination in 2012)
- TD Arts Organization of the Year by the NB Foundation for the Arts (2009)
- Community Service Excellence Award from the Greater Moncton Chamber of Commerce (2012)
- Recognition Award from the Association of Professional Librarians of NB (2012)
- Dr. Marilyn Trenholme Counsell Award for Community Literacy Programs (2014)
- Excellence Award—Promotion of Linguistic Duality, Commissioner for Official Languages of Canada (2014)
- Dr. Marilyn Trenholme Counsell Award for Community Literacy Programs (2014)
- Prix Acadie-Québec (2018)
- Finalist of the Non-profit Organization of the Year Category at the Chamber of Commerce for Greater Moncton Business Excellence Awards (2018)

== See also ==
- Events in Greater Moncton
