= Mariette Mulaire =

Canadian businesswoman

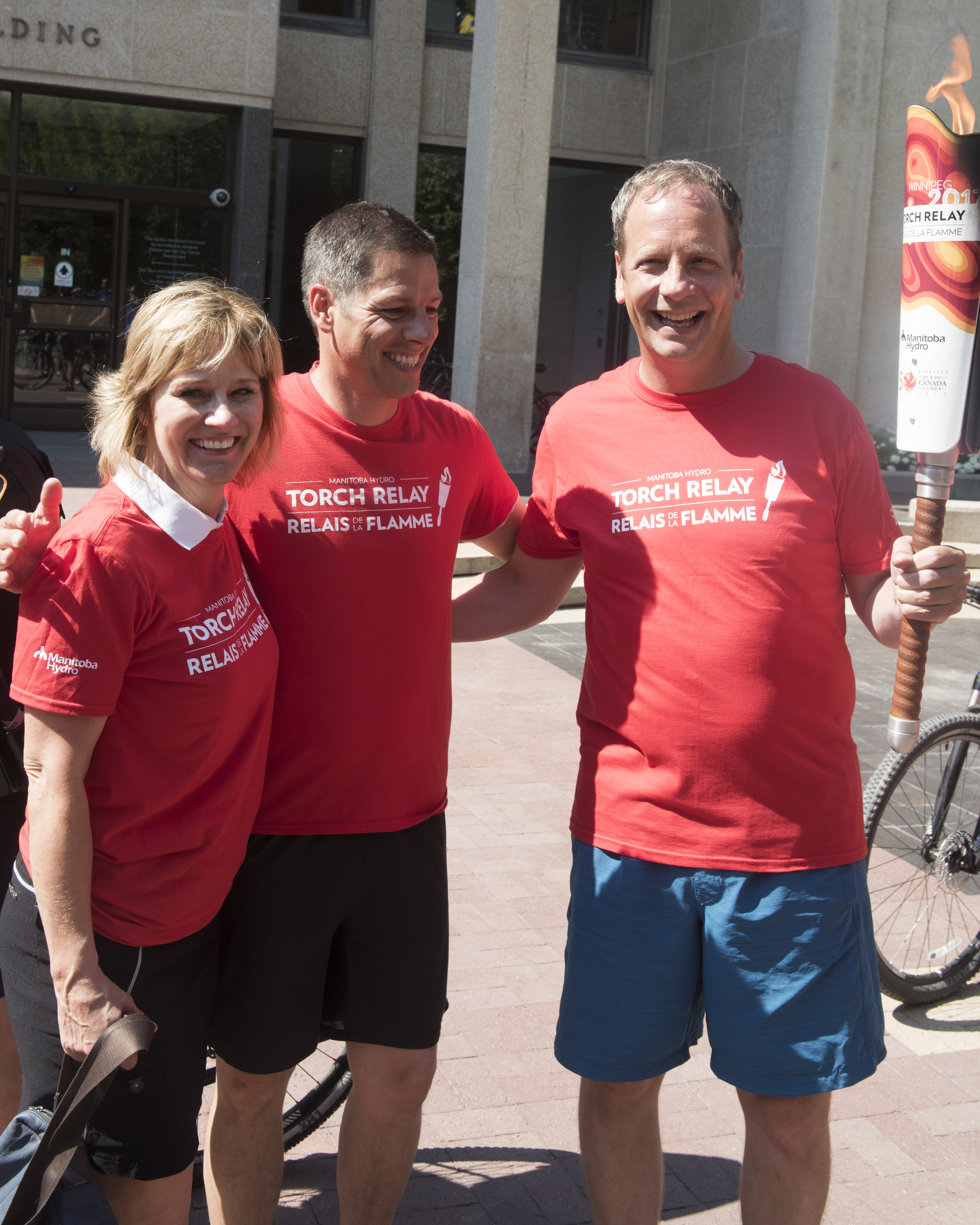
- Mariette Mulaire with John Orlikow and Brian Bowman at the 2017 Canada Games torch relay
- Born: St-Pierre-Jolys, Manitoba
- Occupation: Businesswoman
- Known for: Executive director at the Bank of Canada, President and CEO of World Trade Center Winnipeg

Mariette Mulaire is a Canadian businesswoman serving as the managing director of the World Trade Centers Association since 2022. She has been an executive director at the Bank of Canada since 2018.

Mulaire is a Franco-Manitoban and a proponent of the French language in Manitoba.

== Career ==
Mariette Mulaire was a civil servant for the Department of Canadian Heritage and the Department of Western Economic Diversification from 1984 to 1996. She became an executive director at CDEM (Economic Development Council for Manitoba Bilingual Municipalities) in 1996, and worked there until 2007, when she became the president and CEO of ANIM (l’Agence nationale et internationale du Manitoba, Manitoba's bilingual trade agency) from its foundation until 2012. She became the president and CEO of the World Trade Center Winnipeg in 2012. In 2015, she was awarded the Commissioner of Official Languages’ Award of Excellence – Promotion of Linguistic Duality. In 2022, Mulaire resigned her position at the World Trade Center Winnipeg to become managing director of the World Trade Centers Association.
