= Bernard St-Laurent =

Bernard St-Laurent is the name of:

- Bernard St-Laurent (politician) (1953–2015), member of Canadian Parliament 1993–1997
- Bernard St-Laurent (broadcaster), Canadian radio host
