= Anne Lagacé Dowson =

Canadian radio journalist

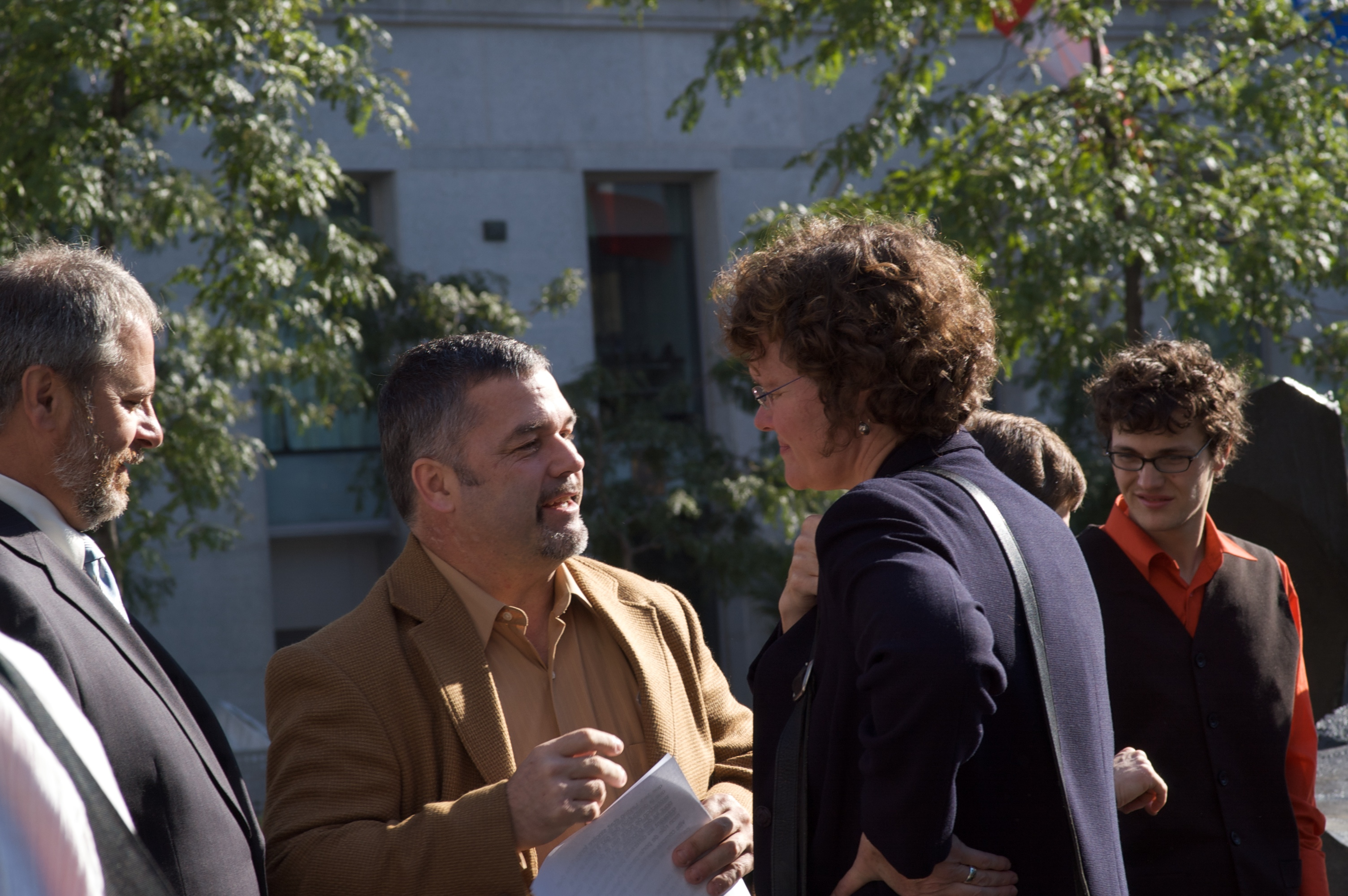
Anne Lagacé Dowson talking with Daniel Breton

Anne Lagacé Dowson (born January 29, 1959, in Toronto, Ontario) is a Canadian radio journalist.

== Radio career ==
A longtime host of CBC Radio's Radio Noon, a daily current affairs and phone-in program in Quebec, she left to run for political office in 2008. She also hosted Home Run in Montreal, and was producer of C'est la Vie. She was a news reporter, arts reporter, press reviewer, and has guest hosted Cross Country Checkup and As It Happens, where she was also a producer. Anne has been a frequent guest in the francophone media, she was a juror on the Radio Canada version of Canada Reads, entitled Le Combat des livres, and she championed Mordecai Richler's Barney's Version.

She was a daily presence on the Radio-Canada radio program Sans Préliminaires with Franco Nuovo. She has been a member of a weekly politics panel on Radio-Canada's flagship television newscast Le Téléjournal with Jean-François Lisée, Liza Frulla and Tasha Kheiriddin, hosted by Céline Galipeau.

Anne was the first ever Anglophone spokesperson for the Festival International du Film sur l'Art in Montreal, the biggest festival of films on art in the world.

From September 2009 to August 2011, she hosted a Saturday afternoon show on CJAD-AM in Montreal. She now participates in the Tommy Schnurmacher Show as a member of the Gang of Four, and does a weekly column on politics on the drive show with Aaron Rand.

Her column about Anglo Quebec entitled "Bloke Nation" appeared in the entertainment weekly Hour Community.

In 2015, she was the guest host for the noontime Barry Morgan Show when Barry was on vacation on Montreal's CJAD 800 AM radio.

== Political career ==
She was the New Democratic Party candidate in the 2008 Canadian federal election for Westmount—Ville-Marie, coming second to Liberal Marc Garneau. She had originally been the party's candidate in a by-election for Westmount—Ville Marie, which was superseded by the general election call.

She was endorsed by Cory Doctorow of Boing Boing, McGill University academics Charles Taylor and Desmond Morton, human rights lawyer Julius Grey and the former mayor of Westmount, May Cutler.

She ran for office in the 2015 election in the riding of Papineau, losing against Liberal leader Justin Trudeau.

== Education ==
Dowson holds a B.A. in sociology and women's studies at the University of Ottawa, where she was a member of the student senate, and holds a M.A. (1989) in Canadian studies at Carleton University. At Carleton, Dowson served as vice president of the teaching assistant's union. She moderated at the Montreal Museum of Fine Arts to writers ranging from Salman Rushdie to John Ralston Saul. Invited by the governor general, she hosted events at Rideau Hall, most recently three national panel debates on the arts.

Fluently bilingual, she is the daughter of trade unionist Hugh Dowson of Toronto and Québec City's Claire Lagacé. Claire Lagacé studied with the Ursulines alongside leading Québec author Anne Hébert, from whom Anne derives her name.

Her great uncle Pierre Édouard Blondin was a Conservative Minister in Prime Minister Robert Borden's government, and went on to become Speaker of the Senate. Her uncle Ross Dowson ran for Mayor of Toronto after the war on a Trotskyist platform.

Her aunts Lois and Joyce Dowson co-founded the Ontario chapter of the Canadian Hemophilia Society in the 1950s after Joyce, married to sculptor Joe Rosenthal, discovered that their son, Ronald Rosenthal, had hemophilia. Lois and Joyce were also leading pro choice activists, and supporters of Henry Morgentaler.

== Electoral history ==
2015 Canadian federal election: Papineau
Party	Candidate	Votes	%	±%	Expenditures
Liberal	Justin Trudeau	26,391	51.98	+14.05	$129,821.55
New Democratic	Anne Lagacé Dowson	13,132	25.87	−3.6	$111,652.95
Bloc Québécois	Maxime Claveau	6,182	12.18	−12.71	$19,007.27
Conservative	Yvon Vadnais	2,390	4.71	−0.33	$5,649.91
Green	Danny Polifroni	1,443	2.84	+0.95	$82.71
Independent	Chris Lloyd	505	0.99	–	$5,759.41
Rhinoceros	Tommy Gaudet	323	0.64	–	–
Independent	Kim Waldron	159	0.31	–	$2,101.20
Marxist–Leninist	Peter Macrisopoulos	142	0.28	−0.25	–
No affiliation	Beverly Bernardo	103	0.2	–	–
Total valid votes/expense limit		50,770	98.64		$213,091.50
Total rejected ballots		698	1.36	–	
Turnout		51,468	65.44	–	
Eligible voters		78,649			
Liberal notional hold		Swing		+8.83	
Source: Elections Canada

2008 Canadian federal election: Westmount—Ville-Marie
Party	Candidate	Votes	%	±%	Expenditures
Liberal	Marc Garneau	18,041	46.47	+0.79	$78,009
New Democratic	Anne Lagacé Dowson	8,904	22.93	+7.56	$79,186
Conservative	Guy Dufort	6,139	15.81	−1.84	$34,968
Bloc Québécois	Charles Larivée	2,818	7.26	−5.30	$8,281
Green	Claude William Genest	2,733	7.04	−1.31	–
Rhinoceros	Judith Vienneau	62	0.16	–	–
Marxist–Leninist	Linda Sullivan	49	0.13	−0.10	–
Independent	David Rovins	47	0.12	–	$30
Communist	Bill Sloan	34	0.09	−0.08	$2,433
Total valid votes/expense limit		38,827	99.43		$83,153
Total rejected ballots		224	0.57	−0.06	
Turnout		39,051	50.64	−3.05	
Eligible voters		77,112			
Liberal hold		Swing		−3.39	
