= Bernard St-Laurent (broadcaster) =

Bernard St-Laurent is a Canadian retired journalist and radio personality, best known as a longtime host of programming on CBC Radio. In 2012, he was given the Award of Excellence – Promotion of Linguistic Duality by the Commissioner of official languages Graham Fraser for having "dedicated his life to keeping English-speaking Canadians informed of what's happening in the other official language".

== Background ==
Originally from Compton, Quebec, he began his career as a journalist with the Sherbrooke Record before joining CJAD in Montreal in 1976 as a political reporter covering the National Assembly of Quebec.

Louis St. Laurent, a former prime minister of Canada, is his great uncle. He has attributed his passion for politics and journalism to the childhood exposure he had to that world, particularly when Louis St. Laurent visited his family with media always in tow.

== CBC ==
He joined the CBC in 1981, initially continuing as a national reporter on Quebec politics.

He left CBC between 1987 and 1991 for various jobs at the Montreal Daily News (columnist, city editor, 1988–1989), MétéoMedia (executive producer, 1989–1990) and the Gazette in Montreal (columnist, 1990–1991).

After rejoining the CBC in 1991, he continued to work as a political analyst for both the English and French services, and served as host of various programs, including the Quebec edition of Radio Noon, Montreal's local afternoon program Homerun and C'est la vie, a national radio program which he created in 1998. He was also a guest host of numerous other programs on the network, including The Current, Sounds Like Canada, As It Happens, The House and Cross Country Checkup.

He retired from the CBC in 2015.
