= Linda Leith =

Montreal-based writer, translator, and publisher

Linda Jane Leith OC is a Montreal-based writer, translator, and publisher.

== Biography ==
Leith was born in Belfast, Northern Ireland, when her family was living in the linen town of Lisburn. After elementary and secondary schooling in London and Basel, Switzerland, she moved to Montreal with her family as an adolescent.

She graduated from McGill University in Montreal in 1970, and then studied in Paris and was awarded her PhD from Queen Mary College of the University of London in 1975.

A member of the Department of English at John Abbott College in Sainte-Anne-de-Bellevue, Quebec, 1976–2000, Leith has also taught at Concordia University and at McGill University in Montreal. In 1990, she spent two years in Budapest, Hungary, with her Hungarian-born first husband and their children. It was here where she wrote her first novel.

The founder of Blue Metropolis Foundation, she spent fourteen years as president and artistic director of Blue Metropolis, the first multilingual literary festival in the world.

Leith stepped aside from Blue Metropolis in 2010 and founded a literary publishing company, Linda Leith Publishing and the online literary forum Salon .ll. in 2011.

She is the author, most recently, of The Girl from Dream City: A Literary Life, published by the University of Regina Press in April 2021. Earlier works of nonfiction works include the literary history Writing in the Time of Nationalism, which The Globe and Mail called "a very fine book," "written in clear, exhilarating prose," and Marrying Hungary, as well as Introducing Hugh MacLennan's Two Solitudes. She is the author of three novels: Birds of Passage (1993), The Tragedy Queen (1995), and The Desert Lake (2007) all published by Signature Editions.

She was awarded the Quebec Writers' Federation Community Award in 2003 and Canada's Commissioner of Official Languages' first Award of Excellence – Promotion of Linguistic Duality, in 2009. She was awarded the Queen Elizabeth II Diamond Jubilee Medal for her "contribution to Canada" in 2012 and in 2020 was appointed an Officer of the Order of Canada.

In March 2026, Leith transferred ownership of Linda Leith Publishing to Co-Publisher and CFO Felicia Mihali.

== Bibliography ==
=== Novels ===
- Birds of Passage, Signature Editions, 1993
- The Tragedy Queen, Signature Editions, 1995 (translated into French by Agnès Guitard, as Un Amour de Salomé, XYZ, 2002)
- The Desert Lake, Signature Editions, 2007

=== Non-fiction ===
- Marrying Hungary, Signature Editions, 2008 (translated into French by Aline Apostolska, as Épouser la Hongrie, Leméac, 2004; translated into Serbian by Aleksandra Mančić, as U braku sa Mađarskom, Rad, 2005)
- Writing in the Time of Nationalism: From Two Solitudes to Blue Metropolis, Signature Editions, 2010 (translated into French by Alain Roy, as Écrire au temps du nationalisme, Leméac, 2014)
- The Girl from Dream City: A Literary Life, University of Regina Press, 2021.
