= Graham Fraser =

Canadian journalist and author (born 1946)

Graham Fraser OC
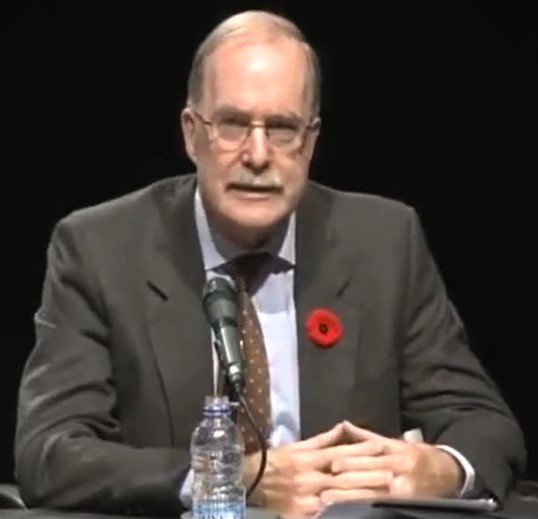
- Fraser in 2011

6th Commissioner of Official Languages
- In office September 2006 – December 2016
- Preceded by: Dyane Adam
- Succeeded by: Ghislaine Saikaley

Personal details
- Born: 1946 (age 79–80) Ottawa, Ontario, Canada
- Spouse: Barbara Uteck
- Education: Upper Canada College, University of Toronto
- Profession: Journalist

Graham Fraser OC (born 1946) is a Canadian former journalist and writer who served as Canada's sixth Commissioner of Official Languages. He is the author of several books, both in English and French.

== Early life and education ==
Fraser is the son of Blair Fraser, a respected newspaper and magazine reporter of the mid-20th century. Blair Fraser drowned on a canoe trip in 1968. Graham Fraser attended Upper Canada College and, later, studied at the University of Toronto where he obtained a BA in 1968 and an MA in history in 1973.

In the summer of 1965, Graham Fraser went on an archeology trip at Fort Lennox, Quebec, with the intention to learn French and learn more about Quebec, as the province was undergoing the vast social transformations of the Quiet Revolution. In his 2006 book Sorry, I Don't Speak French, Fraser described that, in this trip, he felt like a "foreigner in his own country", because of the linguistic and cultural differences he encountered there. This trip sparked his lifelong interest in the Canadian language question and in the relationship between Anglo Canadians and French Canadians.

== Career ==
=== Journalist ===
During his career as a journalist, Fraser wrote for Maclean's, The Globe and Mail, The Montreal Gazette, The Toronto Star and Le Devoir. He served as the National Affairs Correspondent for the Toronto Star, for which he also wrote a weekly column. He was also an adjunct professor of journalism at Carleton University from 2003 to 2008.

=== Commissioner of Official Languages ===
Fraser's unusual abilities as a journalist to write in both of Canada's official languages gave him natural qualifications to be Canada's Commissioner of Official Languages. In early 2006, he published a book, Sorry, I Don't Speak French, in which he reviewed the successes and failures of Canada's official bilingualism policy. It was largely on the basis of this book, and of Fraser's bilingual work experience, that then-Prime Minister Stephen Harper nominated Fraser to be Canada's next Commissioner of Official Languages in September 2006. The nomination was unanimously approved by the House of Commons on October 17.

==== Award of Excellence – Promotion of Linguistic Duality ====
In 2009, Graham Fraser created the Award of Excellence – Promotion of Linguistic Duality. The prize is given annually by the Office of the Commissioner of Official Languages to an individual or organization in Canada that is not subject to the federal Official Languages Act, but that makes a difference by promoting linguistic duality in Canada or abroad, or by contributing to the development of official language minority communities.

==== 2010 Winter Olympics ====
After they were announced, Graham Fraser had identified that the 2010 Winter Olympics, held in Vancouver, were an opportunity to showcase Canada's linguistic duality. He negotiated with the CRTC so that more Canadian homes would have access to Olympics broadcasting in French. However, Fraser voiced his disappointment with the lack of French during the Torch relay, in which many events, such as the Torch's arrival in Victoria, were held only in English.

One of the biggest challenges Fraser had to deal with as Commissioner was regarding the place of French in the 2010 Winter Olympics opening ceremony. Fraser was of the impression that the event was "developed, perceived and presented in English with a French song." Fraser's office received over 100 complaints regarding the ceremony. Minister of Canadian Heritage James Moore, Quebec Premier Jean Charest, and Secretary General of La Francophonie Abdou Diouf also expressed their disappointment regarding the place of French in the Ceremony. VANOC, however, defended their case and said that they had made "a very deliberate focus and effort to ensure a strong celebration of Quebec culture and language." They also said that there was a significant amount of French in the opening ceremony. David Atkins also said that the ceremonies did celebrate francophone Canada.

In his official report on the 2010 Winter Olympics opening ceremony, Fraser identified two causes for the lack of French in it. The first was lack of understanding. The commissioner said that "it was apparent that, in several areas, the official language requirements in the multi-party agreement signed by the organizing committee and Canadian Heritage were rather vague and unclear". He also stated the secrecy traditionally given to the opening ceremony prevented the commissioner from making sure that Canada's linguistic duality was well-showcased in the show. In order to prevent such mistake for future major events held in Canada, such as the 2015 Panamerican games, "official language requirements must be specific and clear to ensure that organizing committees grasp the importance of linguistic duality, understand their official languages obligations and plan adequately." In early 2011, the Office of the commissioner of Official Langues published guide in early 2011 based on the lessons learned at the Vancouver Games to help federal institutions and organizing committees of future large-scale sporting events to better understand, plan, implement, and monitor their activities toward the full respect and inclusion of English and French.

One year following the Vancouver games, former VANOC CEO John Furlong discussed the language controversy in the Olympics in his book Patriot Hearts: Inside the Olympics that Changed a Country. Furlong said he had received praise from Fraser before the opening ceremony because of the large amount of bilinguals in his staff. He defended his refusal to apologise for the perceived lack of French in the opening ceremony. He alleged that, when discussing the place of French at the Olympics, "Mr. Fraser pointed fingers from a distance but rarely pitched in with ideas or support." Fraser answered these criticisms, saying that his office had given him precise indications and ideas to promote linguistic duality during the games, which were implemented. He said that, overall, the services in the Games were provided in both official languages, and that the absence of French was mostly in the cultural program, and this was the only part he took issue with.

==== Special Report on Air Canada ====
In June 2016, the commissioner tabled in parliament a special report on Air Canada. In this report, Fraser outlined Air Canada's history of non-compliance with the Official Languages Act since 1969. He stated that Air Canada is one of the institutions that generates the most complaints to his office, and that the numerous interventions of Fraser and his predecessors did very little to enhance their compliance. Since 1988, Air Canada is the only institution which has been brought to court by every Commissioner of official languages. Fraser argued that the compliance of Air Canada to the Official Languages Act is important because "the national airline’s activities should reflect Canada’s bilingual nature."

In the face of these failure to improve Air Canada, Fraser requested the Parliament to modernise the laws and regulations pertaining to Air Canada and the powers of the commissioners. He argued that there are legal gaps in the administration of Air Canada that allows some of their subsidiaries, such as Air Canada Jazz, to be excluded from the Official Languages Act. Fraser requested that these loopholes be closed, and that the Commissioner be granted more coercive powers it can use against federal institutions, such as the ability to impose fines.

Air Canada viewed this special report as unjustified, stating that the number of complaints against them had remained stable at 50 every year.

==== Judicial interventions ====
As commissioner, Fraser intervened in many judicial cases in Canada in order to defend linguistic rights. in 2007, he intervened in a case where the FCFA challenged the abolition of the Court Challenges Program. the plaintiff succeeded in having the program partially restored in June 2008 for the official languages minority component of the program, under the name Language Rights Support Program. Fraser was also coappellant in the DesRochers case, after which the Supreme court of Canada broadened the scope of Part IV of the Official Languages Act. Fraser also intervened in the Nguyen case, after which the Supreme court of Canada interpreted Article 23 of the Quebec Charter of Human Rights and Freedoms in a way favourable to official language minority communities.

=== Professorship ===
As of 2018, Fraser was a visiting professor at the McGill Institute for the Study of Canada.

== Family ==
Fraser's wife Barbara Uteck was Private Secretary for the Governor General of Canada from 2000 to 2006 and lived at Rideau Cottage behind Rideau Hall.

== Award and honours ==
During his life, Graham Fraser received the following distinctions:

- The Public Policy Forum's Hyman Solomon Award for Excellence in Public Policy Journalism (1992)
- An honorary doctorate by the Université Sainte-Anne (2008)
- An honorary doctorate by the University of Ottawa (2008)
- The Baldwin-LaFontaine Award from the Canadian Club of Vancouver (2010)
- Knight of the Order of La Pléiade, awarded by the Assemblée parlementaire de la Francophonie (2011)
- Officer of the Order of Canada (2019)

Fraser was also shortlisted for the Governor General’s Literary Award for Non-fiction in 1984, for his book PQ: René Lévesque and the Parti Québécois in Power.

== Bibliography ==
- Fighting Back: Urban Renewal in Trefann Court (1972)
- PQ: René Lévesque and the Parti Québécois in Power (1984)
- Playing for Keeps: The Making of the Prime Minister, 1988 (1989)
- Vous m'intéressez: Chroniques (2001)
- Sorry, I Don't Speak French: Confronting the Canadian Crisis That Won't Go Away (2006)

Government offices
| Preceded by Dyane Adam | Commissioner of Official Languages; 2006–2016 | Succeeded by Ghislaine Saikaley |
