= D'Iberville Fortier =

Canadian diplomat and public servant

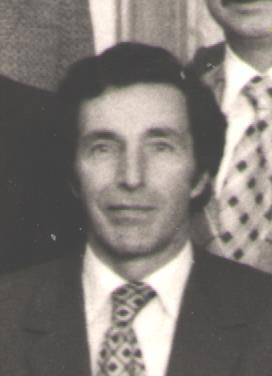

3rd Commissioner of Official Languages
- In office 1984–1991
- Preceded by: Max Yalden
- Succeeded by: Victor Goldbloom

Personal details
- Born: February 5, 1926 Montreal, Quebec
- Died: April 22, 2006 (aged 80)

D'Iberville Fortier, OC (February 5, 1926 – April 22, 2006) was a Canadian diplomat and public servant.

== Career ==
A career diplomat, his service spanned the years 1952 to 1984. During this time, he was the Canadian ambassador to: Libya, Tunisia, Italy, Luxembourg, and Belgium. In addition, he was the High Commissioner to Malta and the Acting Canadian Commissioner at the ICSC for Cambodia.

From 1984 to 1991, he was the third Commissioner of Official Languages.

In 2000, he was made an Officer of the Order of Canada in recognition of being "a public servant and a diplomat highly respected in the international community".

Government offices
Preceded by Max Yalden	Commissioner of Official Languages; 1984–1991	Succeeded by Victor Goldbloom
