= Max Yalden =

Canadian diplomat (1930–2015)

Max Yalden CC

2nd Commissioner of Official Languages
- In office 1977–1984
- Preceded by: Keith Spicer
- Succeeded by: D'Iberville Fortier

Canadian Ambassador to Luxembourg
- In office 1984–1988
- Preceded by: D'Iberville Fortier
- Succeeded by: Jacques J.A. Asselin

Canadian Ambassador to Belgium
- In office 1984–1987
- Preceded by: D'Iberville Fortier
- Succeeded by: Jacques J.A. Asselin

Personal details
- Born: Maxwell Freeman Yalden; April 12, 1930 Toronto, Ontario, Canada
- Died: February 9, 2015 (aged 84) Ottawa, Ontario, Canada
- Spouse: Janice Yalden
- Children: Robert Yalden; Cicely Yalden (deceased)
- Education: University of Michigan
- Occupation: Diplomat, civil servant

Maxwell Freeman Yalden, CC (April 12, 1930 – February 9, 2015) was a Canadian civil servant and diplomat.

Born in Toronto, Ontario, he received a Bachelor of Arts degree from the University of Toronto in 1952, a Master of Arts degree in 1954 and a Ph.D in 1956 from the University of Michigan. He joined the Department of External Affairs in 1956. From 1969 to 1973, he was assistant under-secretary of state and in 1973 was deputy minister of communications.

He was the second Commissioner of Official Languages from 1977 until 1984. He was Ambassador to Belgium and Luxembourg from 1984 to 1987. From 1987 to 1996 he was the Chief Commissioner of the Canadian Human Rights Commission. In 1996 he was elected to a four-year term a member of the United Nations Human Rights Committee. He was re-elected for a second term in 2000.

In 1988 he was made an Officer of the Order of Canada and was promoted to Companion in 1999. In 1998 he was awarded an Honorary LL.D. from Carleton University.

He died at Ottawa, Ontario, at age 84, from pneumonia complications.

Government offices
Preceded by Keith Spicer	Commissioner of Official Languages; 1977–1984	Succeeded by D'Iberville Fortier
