= Aberdeen Cultural Centre =

Acadian cultural centre in Moncton, NB

Coordinates: 46.0933°N 64.7782°W

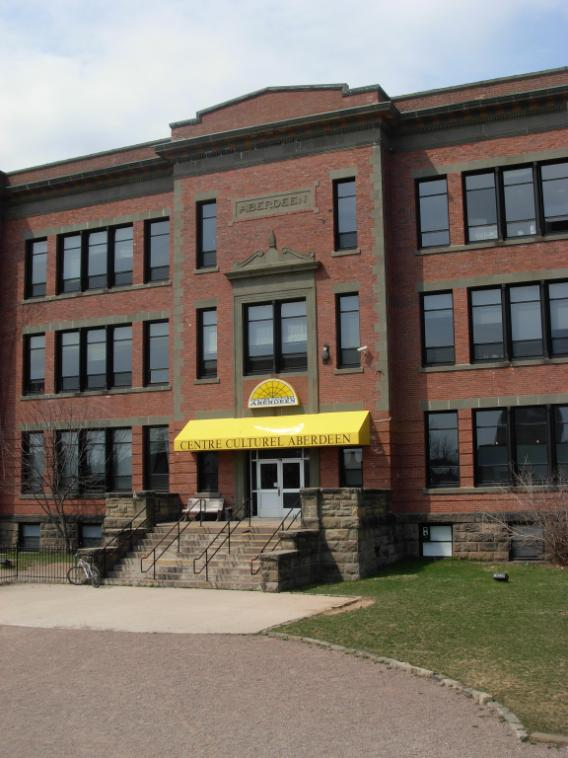
- Established: 1990
- Location: 140 Botsford Street; Moncton, New Brunswick; E1C 4X5
- Website: centreculturelaberdeen.com

The Aberdeen Cultural Centre (French: Centre culturel d'Aberdeen) is an Acadian cultural cooperative containing multiple studios and galleries and is located on Botsford Street in Moncton, New Brunswick. The Centre houses the Galerie Sans Nom, which presents art exhibitions that showcase current trends in visual arts, concentrating on artists from across Canada. Also active in the centre is the Imago Artist-Run Print Studio, which is a production centre devoted to the continued development and dissemination of printmaking.

The Aberdeen Cultural Centre is located in the building that once housed Aberdeen High School, built in 1898.

== Affiliations ==
The Museum is affiliated with: CMA, CHIN, and Virtual Museum of Canada.

== See also ==
- Events in Greater Moncton
- Frye Festival
