= Radio Noon =

Canadian midday radio programme

Radio Noon is the name of CBC Radio One's regional noon-hour programs in the Canadian provinces of Manitoba, Quebec and Newfoundland and Labrador. It was formerly the name of all of the network's noon programs, regardless of location, although many of the programs have since adopted new names such as Maritime Noon, BC Almanac and Ontario Today.

Each province has its own Radio Noon program, which is produced by the network's primary station in the province but airs provincewide. All of the programs follow roughly the same format, with interviews mixed with phone-in segments.

== Manitoba ==
Radio Noon in Manitoba is produced at the studios of CBW in Winnipeg, and is hosted by Marjorie Dowhos.

== Newfoundland and Labrador ==
Produced at the studios of CBN in St. John's, the Newfoundland and Labrador edition (called Cross Talk) is hosted by Adam Walsh.

== Quebec ==
CBME-FM in Montreal produces the Quebec edition of Radio Noon. Formerly hosted by Anne Lagacé Dowson (who took a leave from the network to run as a candidate in the Westmount—Ville-Marie by-election), and later by veteran broadcaster Bernard St-Laurent (who retired in 2015), the program's current host is Shawn Apel.
