= Dyane Adam =

Canadian politician

5th Commissioner of Official Languages
- In office 1999–2006
- Preceded by: Victor Goldbloom
- Succeeded by: Graham Fraser

Personal details
- Born: 1953 (age 72–73) Casselman, Ontario, Canada
- Education: University of Ottawa
- Profession: Psychologist, University professor
- Employers: University of Ottawa; Glendon College; Laurentian University

Dyane Adam, CM OOnt (born 1953) was the Canadian Official Languages Commissioner from 1999 to 2006. She was responsible for promoting bilingualism within the government of Canada. She holds a PhD in psychology from the University of Ottawa and taught at this university, as well as at Glendon College and Laurentian University.

After she had led a campaign to preserve bilingualism at York University and Montfort Hospital, then-Prime Minister Jean Chrétien appointed her Official Languages Commissioner.

As Commissioner of Official Languages, Adam has often been critical of the government in regards to the application of the Official Languages Act within the Canadian Forces, on the Internet, in Ottawa, and in the airline industry. She took part in the elaboration of the 2003-2008 government action plan on official languages. She had a key role in the 2005 modification of the Official Languages Act, which expanded the prerogatives of part 7 of the Act, requiring all federal departments and agencies to take positive actions for the development of Canada's Official Languages minority communities.

In September 2006, after her term had been extended by several months, it was announced that Graham Fraser would replace her.

She was awarded honorary doctorates from McGill University, University of Ottawa, Université de Moncton, Laurentian University, Saint Paul University as well as an honorary diploma from Collège Boréal. Dr. Adam was also made Chevalier de l'Ordre des Palmes académiques de la France et Chevalier de l'Ordre de la Pléiade de l'Assemblée parlementaire de la Francophonie. She received the Golden Jubilee Medal of the Order of Canada in 2013.

In September 2016, Adam was appointed by the provincial government to chair the French Language University Planning Board which led to the creation of the Université de l'Ontario français (UOF) in 2018. Adam served as the chair of the university's board of governors from 2018 to 2022.

In 2019, a French-language elementary school in Milton, Ontario, was named after her.

Government offices
Preceded by Victor Goldbloom	Commissioner of Official Languages; 1999–2006	Succeeded by Graham Fraser
