= Ghislaine Saikaley =

Interim Commissioner of Official Languages
- In office December 19, 2016 – January 29, 2018
- Preceded by: Graham Fraser
- Succeeded by: Raymond Théberge

Personal details
- Born: 1962 (age 63–64) Rouyn-Noranda, Quebec, Canada
- Education: Université de Montréal
- Profession: Public Servant

Ghislaine Saikaley (born 1962 in Rouyn-Noranda, Quebec) was the interim Commissioner of Official Languages of Canada from 2016 to 2018. During her tenure as commissioner, she called for a modernization of the Official Languages Act in order to adapt it for the digital age.

== Early life and education ==
Saikaley grew up in Rouyn-Noranda. Her father was a chief of police in the area, and her mother was also working in the police service. She studied at the University of Montreal, where she received a Bachelor's degree in Criminology.

== Career ==
Saikaley entered the Canadian public service in 1986, when she started working at the Rouyn-Noranda Correctional Centre. Within 6 months of working there, she became manager of the facility. She later moved to Granby for family reasons, and then to Hull in order to become manager of the parole office in the region. During this time, the Hells Angels were very active in the area, and Saikaley received numerous death threats related to her work. Her house was therefore put under police surveillance while she held this position.

=== Office of the Commissioner of Official Languages ===
Saikaley joined the Office of the Commissioner of Official Languages in 2008 as Assistant Commissioner, responsible for the Offices' investigations into breach of compliances of the Official Languages Act.

Upon Graham Fraser's retirement as Commissioner of Official Languages, Saikaley was appointed as interim commissioner in December 2016 for a 6-month period. Five months later, Canadian Prime Minister Justin Trudeau nominated Madeleine Meilleur to replace her replacement for commissioner. The opposition parties labelled this nomination as partisan, because Meilleur was a former Ontario Liberal Party Minister. Meilleur eventually withdrew her bid to become commissioner in June 2017. Saikaley's 6-month term as interim commissioner ended up expiring without a replacement appointed, leaving the Office of the Commissioner of Official Languages in a "legal limbo" where it was devoid of all authority without a commissioner. Saikaley's mandate was extended for another 6 months shortly thereafter.

During her time as commissioner, Saikaley suggested, among other things, that the Official Languages Act be modernized and minimum standards of English-French bilingualism required to become a manager in the Canadian civil service be elevated. On the former, Saikaley stated that the Treasury Board Secretariat's low English-French proficiency requirement resulted in a lack of uniform application of part V of the Official Languages Act.

Government offices
Preceded by Graham Fraser	Commissioner of Official Languages; 2016–2018	Succeeded by Raymond Théberge
