= C'est la vie (radio program) =

C'est la vie is a Canadian English language radio program about Francophone Canadian life, language and culture. First aired in 1998, the program was heard on CBC Radio One at 7:30 on Sunday evening and repeated at 11:30 Tuesday morning. The program covered both news and arts stories from Quebec, and aspired to give English Canada a greater contextual understanding of the province's politics and culture.

A regular feature of the show was "The Word of The Week," where a key French language word used in the main story of the episode was put into focus with recordings of ordinary people illustrating how the word is used in conversation. Afterward, the word is discussed by the host and the series' resident language expert, Johanne Blais, "The Word Lady."

The program was created by Bernard St-Laurent, who hosted it until his retirement from the CBC in June 2015. The program was initially expected to continue with a new host in the fall; although the CBC never issued a formal cancellation announcement, the program has not aired on the Radio One schedule since 2015.
