= Language Rights Support Program =

Language Rights Support Program (LRSP) is or was a non-profit organisation whose objectives are "to promote awareness of language rights through public education; to offer access to alternative dispute resolution processes to settle disputes out of court; to support litigation that helps to advance and clarify constitutional language rights when test cases are involved and dispute resolution efforts have not resolved matters."

Following the abolition of the Court Challenges Program of Canada in 2006, the Language Rights Support Program was created in 2008, receiving an annual budget of $1.5 million from the Government of Canada.

The LRSP works to promote constitutional language rights in Canada and offers financial aid to individuals, groups and non-profit organizations who belong to official language communities in Canada and who feel their constitutional language rights have been breached.

Financial aid can be awarded for alternative dispute resolution such as mediation, negotiation and arbitration or it can be awarded for litigation. To receive financial aid, applicants must fulfill the criteria set forth by the LRSP, most importantly having a case that involves constitutional language rights.
