= Court Challenges Program of Canada =

Canadian non-profit organization

Court Challenges Program
- Abbreviation: CCP - PCJ
- Type: Nonprofit organization
- Headquarters: Ottawa
- Location: Canada
- Website: https://pcj-ccp.ca/

The Court Challenges Program of Canada (CCP) is a non-profit organization whose stated purpose is "to provide financial support to Canadians to bring before the courts test cases of national significance that aim to clarify and assert certain constitutional and quasi-constitutional official language rights and human rights".

Its history can be traced to 1978, when the federal government of Canada began providing assistance for minority language cases. The government of Brian Mulroney created an expanded Court Challenges Program in 1985, after the equality section of the Canadian Charter of Rights and Freedoms became law. However, the Mulroney government later withdrew financial support for the program in 1992. This was a controversial decision, and was opposed by some people. The government of Jean Chrétien re-established the program in 1994, and the current CCP traces its origins to this period.

The government of Stephen Harper abolished the $5.5 million in funding for the program in 2006. This was again a controversial decision, and was strongly criticized by some civic society groups. For a time the CCP stopped accepting new applications for funding, although it honoured pre-existing grants and continued to process requests for reimbursement for these grants. The program was partially restored in June 2008 for the official languages minority component of the program, under the name Language Rights Support Program.

As of February 2017, the Court Challenges Program has been reinstated with an annual budget of $5 million. Since then up to May 2022, the program has received 115 applications for the official languages rights branch and 292 for the human rights branch. Of those, the CCP funded 74 and 127 respectively. The information as to which cases are funded is not disclosed in the interest of preserving the right of program applicants to keep their information confidential, just as any other person or group seeking legal action.
