= Raymond Théberge =

Canadian writer (born 1952)

7th Commissioner of Official Languages
- In office January 29, 2018 – March 30, 2026
- Preceded by: Ghislaine Saikaley
- Succeeded by: Kelly A. Burke

Personal details
- Born: 1952 (age 73–74) Ste. Anne, Manitoba, Canada
- Education: Université de Moncton, McGill University, Université de Saint-Boniface
- Profession: Public servant, University professor

Raymond Théberge (born 1952 in Sainte-Anne-des-Chênes, Manitoba) is the former Commissioner of Official Languages of Canada, having held this position from 2018 to 2026. He was previously the ninth President and Vice-Chancellor of the Université de Moncton from June 1, 2012, to January 26, 2018.

== Early life and education ==
Théberge holds a Ph.D. in Linguistics from McGill University (1984), a Master of Arts in Applied Linguistics from the University of Ottawa (1976) and a Bachelor of History degree from the Université de Saint-Boniface (1973).

== Career ==
After having finished his Ph.D., Théberge served as Director General of the Société franco-manitobaine for 1 year.

=== Academic career ===
Between 1985 and 2003, he held several positions related to teaching, research and university administration. In 1985, he became director of the Research Center at the Université de Saint-Boniface, a position he held for 18 years. During this period, he also held other position. From 1994 to 1995, he was acting Dean Faculty of Arts and Social Sciences at the Université de Saint-Boniface. Théberge was president and director of the Centre d’études franco canadiennes de l’Ouest from 1995 to 2004. He was professor and associate professor at Université Laval between 2001 and 2003. In 1997, Raymond Théberge was appointed Dean of the Faculty of Education at the Université de Saint-Boniface, a position he held until 2003.

Raymond Théberge has authored more than 20 peer-reviewed publications, 84 papers and presentations, three books, a bibliography and 45 research projects on education, community, communication, culture and economics.

=== Public service ===
Raymond Théberge then entered the Canadian public service as a senior official. From 2004 to 2005, he was Assistant Deputy Minister of the Bureau de l’éducation française in Manitoba's Department of Education, Citizenship and Youth. From 2005 to 2009, he headed the Council of Ministers of Education of Canada (CMEC) as executive director.

Raymond Théberge has been a member of the Board of the UNESCO International Bureau of Education, and a member of the Working Group for the Preparation of the International Conference education. Raymond Théberge also chaired the following institutions: the Council of the Deans and Directors of Education in Manitoba, the Manitoba Teacher Education and Teaching Certification Committee, the Departmental Task Force on Teacher Shortages in Manitoba, and the Francophone Association of Deans and Directors of Education in Canada. He was Co-Chair of the Round Table on Basic Education organized by the Canadian International Development Agency (CIDA).

=== University of Moncton ===
In June 2012, Mr. Théberge was named President and Vice-Chancellor of the Université de Moncton, the largest francophone university in Canada outside of the province of Quebec. Under his leadership, the university's first ever strategic plan was implemented, based on extensive consultation and dialogue with the province's post-secondary, francophone and Acadian communities.

=== Commissioner of official languages ===
In December 2017, Prime Minister Justin Trudeau announced the appointment of Raymond Théberge as Canada's next Commissioner of Official Languages. He began his duties as Commissioner on January 29, 2018.

==== Nomination of Mary Simon as governor general ====
On July 19, 2021 Théberge confirmed that his office would "investigate the process for nominating governors general" in Canada, following over 400 complaints to his Office that the governor general designate, Mary Simon, does not speak French. Simon is fluent in English and Inuktitut, and has committed to learning French as part of her mandate. The governor general is the federal viceregal representative of the Canadian monarch.

The investigation will target the Privy Council Office for its advisory role in the governor general selection process. In an official statement, Théberge addressed a perception of nominations to high offices in Canada. "Too often, I see a discourse that puts respect for diversity and inclusion on one hand, and respect for official languages on the other, as if they could not coexist. I would like to remind decision-makers that it is entirely possible to respect official languages while being inclusive.". In the same statement, Théberge nonetheless noted that Simon's appointment could enable her to help preserve Indigenous and minority languages in Canada.

The Official Languages Act does not mandate any language requirement for the governor general, nor does it provide the Commissioner with any authority to provide any remedy or relief, apart from the ability to author reports for Parliament's consideration. However, the Act mandates the commissioner to investigate good-faith complaints related to alleged non-compliance of "the spirit and intent" of the Official Languages Act with regard to the "administration of the affairs of any federal institution." Since the adoption of the Official Languages Act in 1969, two unilingual anglophone governors general were appointed: Ed Schreyer and Ray Hnatyshyn. Neither they nor the process for their nomination was investigated by the Commissioner for Official Languages at the time.

== Bibliography ==
- Demain, la francophonie en milieu minoritaire ? (1987)
- Canada : horizons 2000, Un pays à la recherche de soi (1997)
- Cahiers franco-canadiens de l’Ouest. Numéro spécial, La question métisse: entre la polyvalence et l’ambivalence identitaires, volume 14, number 1 and 2. (2003)

Government offices
Preceded by Ghislaine Saikaley	Commissioner of Official Languages; 2018–2026	Succeeded by Kelly A. Burke
