= Office of the Commissioner of Official Languages =

- Commissariat aux langues officielles

Agency overview
- Formed: 1970
- Jurisdiction: Official languages in Canada
- Headquarters: 30 Victoria Street; Gatineau, Quebec K1A 0M6
- Employees: 174
- Annual budget: $21.9M (2019)
- Agency executive: Kelly A. Burke, Commissioner of Official Languages
- Website: www.ocol-clo.gc.ca

The Office of the Commissioner of Official Languages of the Canadian government is responsible for achieving the objectives of, and promoting, Canada's Official Languages Act. Canada has two official languages: English and French.

The 1988 Official Languages Act mandates this office and its commissioner, who holds office for seven years. Its mission has three main objectives: ensuring the equality of English and French within the Government of Canada and institutions subject to the Act; preserving and developing official language communities; and ensuring the equality of English and French in Canadian society at large.

== Commissioners of Official Languages ==
From 1999 to 2006, the commissioner was Dyane Adam, who was born in Casselman, Ontario, and holds a doctorate in clinical psychology from the University of Ottawa. After the federal election of January 2006, Prime Minister Stephen Harper requested that Adam prolong her term by a few months to give him time to find a suitable replacement. On September 13, 2006, he nominated Graham Fraser for the post.

In November 2017, Prime Minister Justin Trudeau nominated Raymond Théberge, the President and Vice-Chancellor of Université de Moncton, as the commissioner replacing Fraser. The nomination was approved in December 2017. Théberge is the first Commissioner from Western Canada and from outside Ontario and Quebec.

- Keith Spicer, 1970–1977
- Max Yalden, 1977–1984
- D'Iberville Fortier, 1984–1991
- Victor Goldbloom, 1991–1999
- Dyane Adam, 1999–2006
- Graham Fraser, 2006–2016
- Ghislaine Saikaley (interim), 2016–2018
- Raymond Théberge, January 29, 2018 – March 30, 2026
- Kelly A. Burke, March 30, 2026 – present
