= Proposal for the Province of Toronto =

Proposed Canadian province

A map of the Greater Toronto Area with the City of Toronto and the four surrounding regional municipalities.

The Province of Toronto is an urban secession proposal to split the city of Toronto and some or all of the Greater Toronto Area (GTA) from the province of Ontario into a new Canadian province. Secession of Toronto, the surrounding region, or any other portion of the province from Ontario to create a new province would require an amendment to the Constitution of Canada.

The proposal for a new province of Toronto has been made by politicians and urban affairs commentators, in 2010 by MPP Bill Murdoch, and most recently by 2018 Toronto mayoral candidate and former Toronto Chief Planner Jennifer Keesmaat. The concept has also been supported by Jane Jacobs and others.

Variations of the proposal have appeared intermittently for decades.

In fact, the remedy he proposes has been discussed, off-and-on for decades, by a variety of urban advocates dedicated to securing more power, autonomy and clout for Canada's largest city.

— Editorial, "Should Toronto be a province?", Toronto Star

== Causes ==
Arguments posited for Toronto or GTA provincehood include those stating that the area's residents are politically and economically exploited by the rest of the province. Another argument presented is the urban issues faced by Toronto not present in other cities or rural areas of Ontario, including the delivery of public services to large numbers of immigrants and visible minorities, gun control, and differences in the delivery of education and health care to its residents. A federal political issue is the Greater Toronto Area's under-representation in the House of Commons.

The Toronto region, with a population of almost six million, is under-represented in the Commons with fewer seats than its population warrants.

— Jim Coyle, "Toronto secede? Where's the door?", Toronto Star

Murdoch's proposal was motivated by a contrary sentiment, that the rural areas of Ontario have little clout in the Legislative Assembly of Ontario compared to Toronto. Andrew Steele, in an editorial in The Globe and Mail, stated that Murdoch was instead speaking to the rural base of voters in his constituency and calling for the separation of rural Ontario from Toronto. Another argument sometimes presented to support a split of Toronto from the province is that politicians from other cities in the province are concerned about their influence on provincial politics.

He said rural Ontario is fighting a losing battle against "a Toronto mentality," adding that Toronto decision-makers ignore rural voices.

— The Canadian Press, "MPP's vision: Province of Toronto", Toronto Star

Glen Murray has stated that Canadian cities must rely on property taxes, as they have no ability to enact other taxes or collect income or consumption taxes.

Cities - largely reliant on stagnant property taxes - need access to growing revenue sources such as the income tax, and consumption taxes such as the GST, the PST and the gas tax, Murray says. And they need the power to spend that money for the good of their residents without having to ask the province for permission.

— Laurie Monsebraaten, "Toronto the could...", Toronto Star

== History ==
The Province of Toronto was first proposed as the name of the province of Ontario during the debates leading to Canadian Confederation in 1867. British imperial officials considered the name after noting that Quebec City was the capital of Quebec, and hence Toronto should be the capital of a similarly named province. The idea had little traction and was dismissed in favour of using the same name for the province as the lake adjacent to its capital city, Lake Ontario.

The provincehood movement idea has been supported by the urban activist Jane Jacobs and urban planner Joe Berridge. Jacobs viewed Toronto as a region, which was split into multiple jurisdictions as an artefact of historical politics.

In the 1970s, Paul Godfrey presented to the Royal Commission on Metropolitan Toronto, as chairman of Metropolitan Toronto, arguments that the region should have the capability to set policy as does a provincial government.

Back in the 1970s, Paul Godfrey, when he was Metro chair, argued before the Royal Commission on Metropolitan Toronto that the region should have the range and flexibility of a province in its decision making.

— Vanessa Lu, "Should Toronto go it alone?", Toronto Star

In 1991 academic and future member of parliament Ted McWhinney argued before a parliamentary committee that if Quebec were to separate Ontario would need to be broken up to rebalance confederation. According to McWhinney, splitting off Toronto would be the most sensible option, pointing to Germany where Hamburg and Berlin have their own states as an example.

Mel Lastman proposed Toronto provincehood in 1999 while attending the Mayors Summit of the Americas in Miami, Florida; he later retracted his comments, but by then, they had already spurred discussion of the idea in the media. Lastman was panned in an editorial by The Hamilton Spectator for not having considered all the consequences of provincehood. Debate flourished, as various proposals were presented, including one for the creation of the Province of Southern Ontario and another for the creation of a city-state status in Canada, which could also include Vancouver and Montreal. The Committee for the Province of Toronto was formed to seek a constitutional amendment enabling the formation of a new province. On 9 February 1999, councillor Michael Walker presented a notice of motion to Toronto City Council on behalf of the committee. Lastman also considered issuing a plebiscite to the residents of Toronto about Toronto provincehood.

"I'm in favour of it considering it and thinking about it", the mayor said, adding the secession question could be put to Torontonians as early as the municipal election in November, 2000.

— Robert Benzie, "Lastman mulls referendum on city secession", National Post

These debates faded, but did result in negotiation between the City of Toronto government and the provincial government about greater autonomy for Toronto, which eventually resulted in new legislation "The Stronger City of Toronto for a Stronger Ontario Act", as well as the City of Toronto Act which granted the city more policy-setting powers; it has used these, for example, to define new taxes, and to ban corporate and union donations for municipal election campaigns. It also indirectly influenced federal policy, as the New Deal for Cities in 2003 was one of the platforms for Paul Martin after he succeeded Jean Chrétien as Prime Minister of Canada.

Tooker Gomberg who placed second to Lastman in the 2000 mayoral election, also favoured the idea. In November 2000, just before the election, he stated that "the province of Toronto idea, though it's a long shot and a long-term solution, is something I favour. It's a compelling idea whose time has not quite come."

At a meeting of the Bruce County Federation of Agriculture in 2010, a Member of Provincial Parliament from central Ontario, Bill Murdoch, suggested that the city of Toronto become its own province, but the other parts of the GTA (also known as the 905) would remain in Ontario, proposing its new capital to be London. David Miller, mayor of Toronto, responded by issuing a message via Twitter, stating "Province of Toronto... an idea whose time has come?", and his spokesman Stuart Green indicated that Miller would consider a public debate about the possible secession of Toronto from Ontario, and Murdoch stated that he received an email from Miller also indicating he was agreeable to a discussion about it. Murdoch had considered presenting a private member's bill to the Legislative Assembly of Ontario about this proposal. Thunder Bay mayor Lynn Peterson opposed Murdoch's proposal, stating that one of the perceived issues was inconsequential, specifically that policies defined in the Ontario legislature are not Toronto-centric. Michael Gravelle, the Minister of Northern Development and Mines, said "I look at it from the perspective of would this be good for Northern Ontario . . . and I don't think it would be".

In 2018, some activists revived the proposal again, after Ontario premier Doug Ford introduced legislation to reduce Toronto City Council from 47 to 25 seats, months after the 2018 municipal election was already underway.

== Constitutional amendment ==
For any part of Toronto and the surrounding region to secede from Ontario to create a new province would require an amendment to the Constitution of Canada. The constitutional amendment would require resolutions from the House of Commons of Canada and the Senate of Canada, and resolutions from the legislative bodies of 7 of the provinces representing at least 50% of the population.

However, it has also been suggested that such an amendment may not be necessary if the federal and provincial government agree to split the province.

Expert opinion suggests it might not require a constitutional amendment. If there was agreement between the feds and the legislature to divide the province, presto, Canada's first and second largest province could apparently be created overnight.

— Don Martin, "Toronto as 11th province not all that far-fetched", Calgary Herald

== By the numbers ==
With 2.6 million residents as of 2016, the city of Toronto is more populous than six provinces: namely, Manitoba, New Brunswick, Newfoundland and Labrador, Nova Scotia, Prince Edward Island and Saskatchewan. With a population of over 6 million, the Greater Toronto Area is more populous than those six, as well as Alberta and British Columbia.

The Province of Toronto would become the second smallest in Canada by area, larger only than Prince Edward Island, whose area is 5,660 km^{2}, but would become the third most populous province in Canada only after Quebec and the resized Ontario.

Name	Total area (km^{2})	Rank	Population est 2011	Rank
Existing Province of Ontario	1,076,395	2 of 10	12,851,821	1 of 10
Existing City of Toronto	630	n/a	2,615,060	n/a
Regional Municipality of Durham	2,523.15	n/a	608,124	n/a
Regional Municipality of Halton	967.17	n/a	501,669	n/a
Regional Municipality of Peel	1,241.99	n/a	1,296,814	n/a
Regional Municipality of York	1,761.84	n/a	1,032,524	n/a
Resized Province of Ontario	1,069,270.85	2 of 11	6,797,630	2 of 11
Combined Province of Toronto	7,124.15	10 of 11	6,054,191	3 of 11

If the boundaries were redefined to also include the adjacent city of Hamilton to turn the contiguous Greater Toronto and Hamilton Area into the new province of Toronto, it would supersede the resized province of Ontario as the 2nd largest province by population.

Name	Total area (km^{2})	Rank	Population est 2011	Rank
City of Hamilton	1138.11	n/a	519,949	n/a
Resized Province of Ontario	1,068,132.74	2 of 11	6,277,681	3 of 11
Combined Province of Toronto	8,262.26	10 of 11	6,574,140	2 of 11

== Political party ==
Registration for the Province of Toronto Party was accepted by Elections Ontario on 18 June 2001, and became effective on 1 July that year. One of its founding members was David Vallance. Members of the party contested for the mayorship of Toronto in the 2003 and 2006 municipal elections.

Paul Lewin's campaign in the 2003 mayoral election used the slogan "Free 416", referring to the regional use of the city's area code as a nickname, while advocating a Province of Toronto. He fared poorly in the municipal election.

David Vallance was the 2006 candidate for the mayoral election in Toronto. He has written several Letters to the Editor over the years on various matters, including the state of Toronto's provincial tax burden. He was a vocal opponent of the amalgamation of the old City of Toronto with neighbouring municipalities in 1997, and led the group Taxpayers Against Megacity. He had previously campaigned for city council in the 1997 municipal election as an extension of his anti-megacity campaign, and also advocated property tax reforms. In 2006, he argued that Torontonians should "take control of our own taxes and control our own destiny".

== See also ==
- Proposal for the Province of Montreal
