= Brent Tyler =

Brent Tyler was a lawyer in Quebec, Canada, known for his frequent court challenges to "Bill 101", Quebec's Charter of the French Language. After several temporary disbarments from the Quebec Bar Association, he no longer appears in the directory of licensed attorneys in Quebec as of 2023.

== Legal career ==
Notable legal cases involving Tyler include:

- He was found guilty of a 1995 assault of a pedestrian who touched his car. The judge found that Tyler got out of his car, knocked the man over and kicked him in the head. He was given a conditional discharge pending a $500 donation to charity. Tyler's argument of self-defense was rejected, the judge saying that "revenge and not self-defense more aptly described what ensued". Despite losing his appeal, Tyler never admitted doing anything wrong and challenged his victim to sue him in civil court.
- He represented a business owner in a 2003 case he called the "Lion and the Walrus" case, where he tried to get part of the French Language Charter that regulated the use of languages other than French on commercial signs declared unconstitutional. He won the case in provincial court but lost the appeals in front of Superior Court and the Quebec Court of Appeal.
- In 2005, he lost a case in the Supreme Court where he tried to get parts of Bill 101 dealing with restrictions on eligibility for English public schools declared unconstitutional. The Supreme Court dismissed the appeal, to which Tyler responded that the Supreme Court "screwed up big time". He applied to the United Nations to review the case. The United Nations also rejected hearing the case, stating that Tyler did not use all the arguments that he could have used when the case was in Canadian courts.
- In 2008, he challenged Quebec's Bill 104, which amended the Charter of the French Language to remove private school education in English as one of the ways that children became eligible for public school education in English, in front of the Supreme Court of Canada. In 2009, The Supreme Court ruled Bill 104 unconstitutional and gave the government of Quebec one year to put in place new rules. The Supreme Court did not grant Tyler the $100,000 in lawyer fees that he was seeking.
- In 2014 he lost a personal case at the Rental Board, having been evicted for frequent late payment of his $700 monthly rent for a 6-room apartment. While Tyler accused his landlord of "intimidation" and "harassment", the Rental Board found that the landlord was simply insisting that Mr. Tyler pay his rent on time.

== Disbarments ==
Tyler was temporarily disbarred in March 2016 for having not filed financial reports with the Quebec Bar Association. He was temporarily disbarred in November 2011 for not completing the continuing education requirements. He was further disbarred for three months in 2019.

== Political activities ==
Tyler was an unsuccessful candidate for the Equality Party in the 1994 Quebec provincial election in the riding of Westmount–Saint-Louis. He came fourth with 727 votes (2.17%), compared to the winner, Jacques Chagnon, who received 26,478 votes (79.2%). (The Equality Party had won the Westmount-Saint-Louis riding in the previous election.)

From 2001 to 2004, he was president of the pro-English language lobby group, Alliance Quebec. His term as president was marked by infighting and questioning of the organization's continued relevance. During his term as president, Alliance Quebec membership dropped by 50% to 1554 members, its lowest-ever number. Also during his term, grants and donations to Alliance Quebec dropped from nearly $950,000 per year to less than $500,000. During his Alliance Quebec tenure, the press characterized him as having a "brazen, ramrod persona" and criticized him for his "hair-trigger temper". He resigned as president 4 months before his term was finished. The year after he resigned, Alliance Quebec ran out of money and closed down.

In June, 2014, Tyler announced in a press conference at the EMSB Headquarters that he will be running for the position of chair for the English Montreal School Board. He dropped out of the race by email in August 2014.

Tyler is a member of the Special Committee for Canadian Unity, a lobby group that existed in the 1990s and revived for one press conference during the 2014 Quebec election to encourage the federal government to intervene in the election.

Tyler states that his law practice has suffered due to his political activities, including his outspoken support for issues such as the partition of Quebec and his controversial Bill 101 cases. Some of his fees for his Bill 101 cases have been paid for by fund-raising events and donations by groups opposed to Bill 101, including: the National Citizens Coalition (then headed by future Canadian Prime Minister Stephen Harper), National Post editor Diane Francis, the lobby group headed by Howard Galganov and the Montreal weekly newspaper, "The Suburban".
