= Proposal for the Province of Montreal =

Proposal for Canadian province

During the prelude to Canadian Confederation in the 1860s, some proposals were made to divide up Lower Canada, the current Province of Quebec, into multiple provinces, the one with the most currency being to create the Provinces of Montreal, Eastern Townships, and Quebec.

After the renewed rise of the Quebec sovereignty movement in the 1990s, efforts revived to create a Province of Montreal. Roopnarine Singh of Montreal founded the Movement for the 11th Province of Montreal in that era. The era before and after the 1995 referendum also produced proposals to split the western Ottawa Valley region, the Eastern Townships of Quebec along the US border, and English-speaking parts of Montreal (such as the West Island and Westmount) into a Province of Montreal. The proposal was made by the partitionist movement, which demands the right for minorities to secede from Quebec if Quebec secedes from Canada. In the wake of the referendum, prominent lawyer and then-federalist Guy Bertrand led a court fight to allow for the creation of the Province of Montreal if Quebec were to secede. West Virginia was used as an example to support the position in public.

== See also ==
- Proposal for the Province of Toronto
- Bloc Montreal
- London independence
