= Independent city =

Type of city or town

An autonomous or independent city or town is a city or town that does not form part of another local government entity, such as a province, county, or similar administrative division. Their legal statuses vary between jurisdictions.

Independent cities are found in many countries under a variety of legal and administrative arrangements. They can have the status of states, provinces, or districts. Some are national capitals established as separate jurisdictions.

Historical examples include the free imperial cities of the Holy Roman Empire. Present-day independent cities include Berlin, Vienna, Seoul, Buenos Aires, and the independent cities of the United States.

== Historical precursors ==
In the Holy Roman Empire, and to a degree in its successor states the German Confederation and the German Empire, so-called "free imperial cities" (nominative singular freie Reichsstadt, nominative plural freie Reichsstädte) held the legal status of imperial immediacy, according to which they were not subinfeudated to any vassal ruler and were instead subject to the authority of the Emperor alone. Examples included Hamburg, Bremen, and Lübeck, along with others that gained and/or lost the privileges of immediacy over the course of the Empire's history.

== National capitals ==
A number of countries have made their national capitals into separate entities.

=== Federal capitals ===
In countries with a federal structure, the federal capital is often separate from other jurisdictions in the country, and frequently has a unique system of government.

== Africa ==
=== Ethiopia ===
Addis Ababa, capital of Ethiopia, has held the designation of chartered city since 1991, when it was separated from the former province of Shewa. It shares this status with one other city, Dire Dawa.

=== Mali ===
Bamako, the capital of Mali, is contained within the Bamako Capital District.

=== Mozambique ===
Maputo, the capital of Mozambique, is its own district with provincial status surrounded by the Province of Maputo.

=== Niger ===
Niger's capital, Niamey, comprises a capital district of Niger. It is surrounded by the Tillabéri Department.

=== Nigeria ===
Nigeria's capital Abuja is located in the Federal Capital Territory. The Territory was established in 1976, and the capital was formally moved from Lagos (the historic capital) in 1991.

== Asia ==
=== Taiwan ===
In Taiwan under the administrative division system of the Republic of China, some cities are directly administered by the Executive Yuan, some are administered by provinces (the province of Taiwan is nominal), and some are subordinate to counties. The centrally-administered (Taipei City, Kaohsiung City, New Taipei City, Taichung City, Tainan City, and Taoyuan City) and province-administered ones are like independent cities under this definition.

=== Korea ===
In both South Korea and North Korea, special cities are independent from their surrounding provinces and city-states under direct governance from the central government. Examples are Seoul, Busan, Daegu, Incheon, Gwangju, Daejeon and Ulsan in South Korea and Pyongyang and Rason in North Korea. In South Korea, the main criterion for granting secession from the province is a population reaching one million.

=== South Korea ===
In addition to its nine provinces, South Korea has seven province-level "metropolitan cities". By far the largest among these in terms of population is the capital, Seoul, called a teukbyeol-si (Korean: 특별시; Hanja: 特別市; lit. ''special city''), which is home to more than 20% of the entire population of the country. The remaining six independent cities are called gwangyeok-si (광역시; 廣域市; lit. ''large city'') whose names are: Busan, Daegu, Daejeon, Incheon, Gwangju, and Ulsan.

Historically, these independent cities have been carved from the province that surrounds them. Consequently, they typically share a strong regional and cultural identity with the adjoining province(s). For instance, Gwangju, located at the center of Jeolla region, is heavily associated with the region. Seoul and Incheon are said to make up the Seoul Metropolitan Area with the densely populated Gyeonggi that almost completely encompasses them.

One interesting relic of the newer independent cities is that, in some cases, the government administrative buildings (docheong) of the provinces they were once a part of are still located within city boundaries, meaning that these provinces have capitals that are not within their borders.

On 1 July 2012, Yeongi-gun, Chungcheongnam-do absorbed parts of Cheonan, Gongju and Cheongju, and became independent from Chungcheongnam-do as Sejong Special Self-governing City under the Special Act on the Installation of Sejong City. Currently, the population of Sejong Special Self-governing City is lower than that of the aforementioned metropolitan cities, but the population is increasing with the construction of a mixed-use administrative city. In 2006, the ruling party floated a proposal to eliminate all current province and independent-city borders. This plan would divide the entire republic into fifty or sixty city- or county-level administrations, similar to the system in Japan. The plan was intended to help reduce regional discrimination and animosity by eliminating provincial identity.

=== Philippines ===
Many major cities in the Philippines are independent cities, classified as either "highly urbanized" or "independent component" cities. These cities are administratively and legally not subject to a province, and thus do not share their tax revenues with any province. In practise, most cities outside of Metropolitan Manila are often still grouped with provinces that they were partitioned from for the sake of convenience and simplicity. The national government and its agencies serve these cities through sub-offices for each region, to which the cities are indirectly subject. There are 38 such cities, with 16 being located in Metro Manila (including the City of Manila, the national capital); eight in the rest of Luzon and its surrounding islands; seven in the Visayas island group; and seven in Mindanao and its surrounding islands.

=== Vietnam ===
Vietnam has six municipalities that are not part of any of the Vietnam's provinces. This includes Hanoi, the capital of Vietnam; and Ho Chi Minh City (Saigon), the most populous city of Vietnam.

=== China ===
In China, both Beijing and Tianjin are independent of the surrounding province of Hebei, of which they were formerly a part. Similarly, Shanghai is now independent from Jiangsu and Chongqing from Sichuan. Hong Kong and Macao have the status of special administrative regions, separated from their original province Guangdong.

=== Thailand ===
In Thailand, the capital Bangkok operates independently of any province and is considered a special administrative area. It is a primate city in terms of its large population, having nearly 8% of Thailand's total population.

=== Indonesia ===
In Indonesia, the national capital Jakarta is within the Daerah Khusus Ibukota Jakarta (Jakarta Capital Special Region). Jakarta is considered one of Indonesia's provinces, therefore Jakarta is headed by a governor and not a mayor. However, Jakarta is divided into 5 smaller "administration-cities" (kota administrasi) and one "administration-regency" (kabupaten administrasi). The administration-cities are Central, North, East, West, and South Jakarta. The Kepulauan Seribu (Thousand Islands) administration-regency is also included in the formal definition of Jakarta. All of these sub-units have their own degree of autonomy. Mayors of the five administration-cities and the regent of Kepulauan Seribu administration-regency are not elected, but directly appointed by the Governor and members of the Provincial Parliament of Jakarta. Furthermore, these sub-units do not have local parliament as opposed to other cities or regencies in Indonesia.

=== India ===
New Delhi and the old city of Delhi together form the National Capital Territory of Delhi.

=== Iraq ===
The capital of Iraq, Baghdad, is contained within a special capital district.

=== Japan ===
In Japan, Tokyo, as well as being a city, forms a prefecture, falling into a special category of "metropolitan prefecture" having some of the attributes of a city and some of a prefecture. Within Tokyo, there are smaller units, "wards", "cities", "towns", etc., but some of the responsibilities normally assigned to cities and towns in other Japanese prefectures are handled by the Tokyo Metropolitan Government instead.

=== Pakistan ===
The capital of Pakistan, Islamabad, is a planned city within the Islamabad Capital Territory, which was created in 1960 out of the Punjab Province. The Territory elects representatives to both houses of the legislature. Before Islamabad was made the capital, Karachi was located in the Federal Capital Territory, which later reverted to the Sindh Province.

=== UAE ===
In United Arab Emirates, the seven emirates are themselves city-states, or were historically, in particular, Dubai Ajman and Sharjah.

=== Mongolia ===
In Mongolia, its only independent city is its capital Ulaanbaatar which doesn't belong to any other provinces within the country.

== Europe ==
=== Austria ===
The city of Vienna is a federal state within the Republic of Austria. A similar concept is the statutory city.

=== Belgium ===
The Brussels Capital Region, a densely built-up area consisting of 19 communes including the capital city Brussels, became one of Belgium's three regions after the country was turned into a federation in 1970. (In Belgium there are special circumstances due to the country's language communities.)

=== Bosnia and Herzegovina ===
The Brčko District is independent of both Entities that constitute Bosnia and Herzegovina (Republika Srpska and Federation of Bosnia and Herzegovina). All other cities and municipalities are under the jurisdiction of the Entity (in Republika Srpska) or under the jurisdiction of cantons (Federation of Bosnia and Herzegovina). The Dayton Peace Agreement afforded the special designation as a district, while also creating the Office of the High Representative that currently oversees the district of Brčko.

=== Bulgaria ===
The capital city of Sofia has the status of oblast (region).

=== Croatia ===
The capital city of Zagreb has the status equal to županija (county), whereas all other cities and municipalities are under a county jurisdiction.

Historically, Croatian cities became independent by being named a "royal free city". Under the Austro-Hungarian Empire, the city of Rijeka (Fiume) was a separate city from the Counties of Hungary, and the Modros-Fiume County that surrounded it.

=== France ===
The city of Paris is both a département and a commune; it is the only French city with this status. The Council of Paris (Conseil de Paris) exercises functions similar to those of a departmental council (conseil départemental) and a city council (conseil municipal). However, Paris and the départements closest to it are part of the Île-de-France région. Lyon is a metropole, a unique territorial collectivity which includes the commune of Lyon itself and its suburbs. The Lyon metropole is an entity which is not part of the nearby Rhone department but it is still part of the Auvergne-Rhône-Alpes region, however it has significant more autonomy than a typical department. All together, the Lyon metropolis makes up the second largest city in France

=== Germany ===
In Germany, most of the federal states are subdivided into administrative districts called Kreise (circles), each of which normally includes several towns or cities. However, a number of the more important and more populous cities are not part of a Kreis, but are instead themselves each equivalent in status and functions to a Kreis. Such cities are known as kreisfreie Städte (literally, "district-free cities") – or, in the case of Baden-Württemberg, Stadtkreise ("urban districts").

There are currently 110 kreisfreie Städte (or equivalents). Of these, the 22 largest are:

- Berlin (Note: Berlin, Hamburg, and Bremen are also federal states in their own right.)
- Hamburg
- Munich (München)
- Cologne (Köln)
- Frankfurt (Frankfurt am Main)
- Stuttgart
- Düsseldorf
- Dortmund
- Essen
- Leipzig
- Bremen
- Dresden
- Hanover (Hannover) (Note: Effectively a kreisfreie Stadt, although the city is de jure a part of the special-status Hanover Region.)
- Nuremberg (Nürnberg)
- Duisburg
- Bochum
- Wuppertal
- Bielefeld
- Bonn
- Münster
- Karlsruhe
- Mannheim

==== Stadtstaaten of Germany ====
Two cities in Germany, namely Berlin and Hamburg, are considered city-states (German: Stadtstaaten). Additionally, the state of Bremen is officially classified as a city-state although it consists of the two cities of Bremen and Bremerhaven, which are separated by the state of Lower Saxony. Together with thirteen area states (German: Flächenländer), they form the sixteen states of Germany. Hamburg and Bremen are "Free and Hanseatic Cities".

Generally, the city-states have no other rights or duties than the other states. Through the financial redistribution system of Equalization Payments in Germany (German: Länderfinanzausgleich), they do receive more money because of their demographic characteristics. The city-states are most distinctive due to the names of their state organs: their governments are called Senate, the prime ministers 'mayor' (Governing Mayor in Berlin and First Mayor in Hamburg) or President of the Senate (in Bremen) and also the expressions for their state parliaments differ from the other states.

In the 18th century, many German cities were free imperial cities (German: Reichsstädte), without a principality between them and the imperial level. After the Napoleonic era, in 1815, four were still city-states: Hamburg, Bremen and Lübeck in Northern Germany, and Frankfurt where the Federal Convention was located. Frankfurt was incorporated by Prussia in 1866, and Lübeck became a part of Prussia during the Nazi regime in 1937 (Greater Hamburg Act). After 1945, Berlin was a divided city, and West Berlin became a German quasi-state under (Western) Allied supervision. Since 1990/1991, the reunited Berlin is an ordinary German state among others.

=== Hungary ===
In Hungary, 23 of the cities are "cities with county rights". These cities have equal rights with the 19 counties of Hungary. Budapest, the capital city is also a special district, outside of the country's system of counties. Although Budapest does not belong to Pest County which surrounds it, it is still the county headquarters.

=== Ireland ===
Cork, Dublin and Galway are governed by independent city councils.

=== Norway ===
In Norway, Oslo is both a municipality (kommune) and a county (fylke) within itself.

=== Poland ===
==== Urban gmina ====
Among Polish municipalities containing a town or a city, 638 are organized as a mixed urban-rural gmina (Polish: gmina miejsko-wiejska) consisting of a town and surrounding villages and countryside, governed by a common municipal government. The remaining 302 of them, however, are a standalone urban gmina (Polish: gmina miejska) which contains solely either an independent town or one of the 107 cities (the latter governed by a city mayor or prezydent miasta).

==== City with powiat rights ====
Among the 107 cities, 66 of them constitute counties in their own right, formally called cities with powiat rights. They are suitably marked on the list of counties in Poland.

=== Romania ===
Bucharest, the capital of Romania, is outside the country's system of counties.

=== Russian Federation ===
In the Russian Federation, Moscow and Saint Petersburg are both subjects of the federation and cities themselves. Russia also considers the Crimean city of Sevastopol to be a federal city of Russia, but this is not recognized by the majority of states who see the 2014 Russian annexation of Crimea as unlawful.

=== Spain ===
In Spain, there exist two so-called autonomous cities, Ceuta and Melilla, which are located on the North African coast surrounded by Morocco and have been under Spanish jurisdiction since the 15th century. Spain is a highly decentralized state organized in autonomous communities. These two cities hold their special status because they are not large enough to be considered regions on their own. Nonetheless, they function as autonomous communities with a high degree of self-administration and law-making powers.

=== Sweden ===
Historically, until 1967, Stockholm did not belong to any county of Sweden. Instead, there was a Governor of Stockholm that had the normal responsibilities of the County Administrative Boards and their managers, the governors. There was no County Council (which is elected by the people and is responsible, for example, for health care); instead, the City of Stockholm handled such tasks.

=== Switzerland ===
One of the cantons of Switzerland, Basel-Stadt, is considered to be a city-state, although it contains two smaller municipalities Bettingen and Riehen alongside the city of Basel itself.

=== Ukraine ===
In Ukraine, the cities of Kyiv and Sevastopol are part of the country constituent regions along with the autonomous republic of Crimea (ARK), and 24 other oblasts (see Oblasts of Ukraine).

=== United Kingdom ===
In the UK, having city status gives the city's local government no additional inherent powers; city status depends on a grant from the monarch and merely confers on the place so designated the right to call itself a city. Many cities and large urban areas are unitary authorities, meaning they have their own local government, separate from the surrounding county. (However, a number of large urban areas have a number of unitary authorities, such as Greater Manchester, which mean they do not have a unified, citywide local government.) County borough referred to a borough or a city, independent of county council control in England and Wales from 1889 to 1974 with the term continuing in use in Northern Ireland. Wales re-introduced the term in 1994 for use with certain unitary authorities.

London, the capital of the United Kingdom and its constituent country England, is administratively Greater London, which consists of the City of London and 32 London boroughs. Greater London is not one of the metropolitan or non-metropolitan counties, which the remainder of England is subdivided into. London has its own assembly and directly elected mayor, which exercise local government/devolved powers greater than any other city or place in the UK, apart from the nations/provinces of Wales, Scotland and Northern Ireland.

== North America ==
=== Canada ===
In the Canadian province of Ontario, independent cities are referred to as a single-tier municipalities. In addition, there are also separated municipalities.

In Quebec, they are often called separated cities, as they are not a part of their surrounding regional county municipality.

In Alberta, all municipalities (cities, towns, villages, and summer villages) are separate from their surrounding county.

In Saskatchewan and Manitoba, all cities, towns, villages, and resort villages are separate from their surrounding rural municipality; unincorporated communities, including local urban districts, remain part of the rural municipality they lie within.

In New Brunswick, all county government was abolished in 1967. Therefore, in theory, all cities, townships, and settlements in New Brunswick could be considered independent cities.

=== Dominican Republic ===
In Dominican Republic the Nacional District, containing the city of Santo Domingo de Guzman was created as a special district in 1922.

=== Mexico ===
Previously, the Federal District was a separate entity from any of the states of Mexico. However, on 30 January 2016, it became one of the states of the United Mexican States, as well as the capital of the country, calling itself Mexico City.

=== United States ===
There are 41 independent cities in the United States. Of these, 38 are in Virginia. They are called 'independent' because they are not in the territory of any county or counties. Independent cities in Virginia may, however, serve as county seats for neighboring counties.

The three independent cities outside Virginia are Baltimore, Maryland; St. Louis, Missouri; and Carson City, Nevada.

New York City displays many features associated with independent cities but is, in fact, a sui generis municipality that is coextensive with five counties. Counties invariably are administrative divisions of state government. In the case of New York City, however, they are also administrative divisions of city government. As city administrative divisions, the five counties are called boroughs, retaining the label 'county' as state administrative divisions. For three out of the five boroughs, the borough and county have different names: the borough of Manhattan is the County of New York; Brooklyn is Kings County; and Staten Island is Richmond County. For the remaining two boroughs, Queens and the Bronx, the county and borough share the same name. Each county elects their own District Attorney to prosecute crimes. Other than that, they have no administrative functions independent of the city government.

Another similar entity is a consolidated city-county. An independent city is not even nominally part of any county, whereas for a consolidated city and county, the county at least nominally exists. In some cases, such as Indianapolis, Indiana, the largest city in a county is consolidated with the county government while smaller communities continue to operate within the same county but separately from Indianapolis. In other cases, such as The City and County of Honolulu, Hawaii, and The City and County of San Francisco, California, there is a complete consolidation of municipality and county. San Francisco, for example, has a chief executive called "Mayor", a term normally associated with city government, but the legislative body is called "Board of Supervisors", which is otherwise associated with county government in California.

Washington, D.C., meanwhile, effectively functions in varying ways as an independent city, consolidated city-county, and state all in one, although it has special Constitutional status as the "district constituting the seat of government of the United States," and is not part of a county or a state. In 1871, the cities of Washington and Georgetown and the County of Washington were consolidated into a single local government.

== South America ==
=== Argentina ===
The Buenos Aires city was previously the Federal District of Argentina. In 1996, under the 1994 reform of the Argentine Constitution, the city gained autonomous city status, and changed its formal name to Autonomous City of Buenos Aires, and held its first mayoral elections. Buenos Aires is represented in the Argentine Senate by three senators and in the Argentine Chamber of Deputies by 25 national deputies.

=== Brazil ===
Brasília, the capital of Brazil, is set within the Federal District. The Federal District is a special unit of the federation, as it is not organized the same manner as a municipality, does not possess the same autonomy as a state (but is ranked among them) and is closely related to the central power. The District Governor is elected directly for a 4-year term. Local laws are issued by a legislative chamber also elected by the local population. Judiciary affairs are carried out by the Union, instead of being appointed by the governor as in the other states of Brazil. The Federal District has the status of a federal state in many aspects. It has representatives both in the Chamber of Deputies (lower house of congress) and in the Federal Senate (upper house of congress).

=== Colombia ===
In Colombia the Capital District, containing the city of Bogotá was created as Special District in 1955 by Gustavo Rojas Pinilla.

=== Venezuela ===
The Capital District has the capital of Venezuela, Caracas.

== Oceania ==
=== Papua New Guinea ===
Port Moresby, the capital of Papua New Guinea, has been contained within the National Capital District of Papua New Guinea since the country achieved independence in 1975.
