= Urban secession =

City becomes independent political unit

Urban secession is a city's secession from its surrounding region to form a new political unit.

This new unit is usually a subdivision of the same country as its surroundings. Many cities around the world form a separate local government unit. The most common reason is that the population of the city is too large for the city to be subsumed into a larger local government unit.

However, in a few cases, full sovereignty may be attained, in which case the unit is usually called a city-state. It is an extreme form of urban autonomy, which can be expressed in less formal terms or by ordinary legislation such as a city charter.

== History ==
Urban autonomy has a long history back to the prehistoric urbanization and the original Mediterranean city-states of classical times, e.g. Ancient Athens, Ancient Rome. In medieval times such measures as the Magdeburg rights established special status for cities and their residents in commercial relations. In general it receded as European cities were incorporated into nation-states especially in the 17th century to 20th century, eventually losing many special rights.

== Theory of urban secession ==
Modern theorists of local civic economies, including Robert J. Oakerson and Jane Jacobs, argue that cities reflect a clash of values, especially of tolerances versus preferences, with views of the city varying from a pure community to that of a pure marketplace. Suburbanites have a strong tendency to view the city as a marketplace since they do not participate in its street life voluntarily, nor do they consider the city to be a safe and comfortable place to live in. By contrast, those who choose downtown living tend to see it as more of a community, but must pay careful attention to their tolerances (for smog, noise pollution, crime, taxation, etc.). Ethics and thus politics of these interest groups vastly differ.

Secession (the setup of entirely new legislative and executive entities) is advocated by certain urban theorists, notably Jane Jacobs, as the only way to deal politically with these vast differences in culture between modern cities and even their nearest suburbs and essential watersheds. She stated that "cities that wish to thrive in the next century must separate politically from their surrounding regions." She rejected the lesser "Charter" and less formal solutions, arguing the full structure of real regional government was necessary, and applied to the urban area alone. In particular she rejected the idea that suburban regions should have any say over the rules in the city: "they have left it, and aren't part of it." Jacobs herself lived in an urban neighborhood (The Annex, Toronto) which would have been paved over in the 1970s by a highway project to serve the suburbs, the Spadina Expressway, had the proponents of urban secession not stopped it. Jacobs likewise took part in blocking the development of the Lower Manhattan Expressway in the 1960s, opposing Robert Moses. These freeways are examples of the clash of urban community versus suburban market interests.

Advocates of highway development and suburban participation in urban government theorize that cities which protect themselves from the suburbs, forcing them to become self-sufficient small towns, cutting off the freeways, forcing commuters into subways, etc., are committing suicide by forcing business out into the suburbs. Advocates respond that cities depend more on their quality of life to attract migrants and professionals, and that remote work makes it possible for workers in the city to live anywhere, coming into town less frequently, without the rush.

== Examples ==
=== City-states and semi-autonomous cities ===
Fully autonomous cities, or city-states, are the objective of urban secession. A modern instance of a city-state is the Republic of Singapore, which was expelled from Malaysia for a variety of political and social reasons. Currently, Singapore is the sole city which has total independence, an indigenous currency, and a substantial military. The other two existing and de jure city-states are Monaco and Vatican City, which operate as, nominally, politically independent urban areas.

Certain cities like Hong Kong and Macau have a degree of autonomy, but not full political independence. Specifically, the status of a special administrative regions (SAR) has been conferred upon Hong Kong and Macau in the People's Republic of China. The reason for their relative autonomy stems from their existence for more than a century as European colonies, and a resultant difficulty of full reintegration.

=== Asia ===
In China, both Beijing and Tianjin are independent of the surrounding province of Hebei, of which they were formerly a part. Similarly, Shanghai is now independent from Jiangsu and Chongqing from Sichuan.

In Japan, Tokyo, as well as being a city, forms a prefecture, falling into a special category of "metropolitan prefecture" having some of the attributes of a city and some of a prefecture. Within Tokyo, there are smaller units, "wards", "cities", "towns", etc., but some of the responsibilities normally assigned to cities and towns in other Japanese prefectures are handled by the Tokyo metropolitan government instead.

In both South Korea and North Korea, special cities are independent from their surrounding provinces and city-states under direct governance from the central government. Examples are Seoul, Busan, Daegu, Incheon, Gwangju, Daejeon and Ulsan in South Korea and Pyongyang and Rason in North Korea. In South Korea, the main criterion for granting secession from the province is a population reaching one million.

Taiwan, officially the Republic of China, administers six cities, formerly part of the Republic of China's Taiwan Province, as special municipalities: Kaohsiung, Taichung, Tainan, Taipei, New Taipei and Taoyuan. (The People's Republic of China, which claims Taiwan, continues to recognise these municipalities as an integral part of PRC's purported Taiwan Province; the People's Republic of China regards Taiwan as its 23rd province, with Taipei as its capital.)

In Indonesia, the capital Jakarta was once part of West Java until it gained special autonomy status and broke away from its former province in 1961. The mayor position was replaced by governor, making it special autonomous province and operates independently from its surrounding provinces

Malaysian capitals Kuala Lumpur and Putrajaya as well as Labuan island were once part of Selangor and Sabah respectively. In 1974 Kuala Lumpur was declared as the first Federal Territory in Malaysia. In order to prevent clashes between Selangor state government and federal government, the state capital of Selangor was later moved to nearby Shah Alam. In 1984 Labuan was chosen by the federal government for the development of an offshore financial centre and declared as the second Federal Territory after Kuala Lumpur. Putrajaya was declared the third Federal Territory in 2001, after the federal government finished developing the city as the new federal capital, while Kuala Lumpur remains the royal capital.

In Thailand, the capital Bangkok operates independently of any province and is considered a special administrative area. It is a primate city in terms of its large population, having nearly 8% of Thailand's total population.

=== Europe ===
The Brussels capital region, a densely built-up area consisting of 19 communes including the capital city Brussels, became one of Belgium's three regions after the country was turned into a federation in 1970. (In Belgium there are special circumstances due to the country's language communities.)

In Bulgaria the capital Sofia is an oblast of its own - Sofia-grad, while the surrounding area is divided between the Pernik Oblast and the Sofia Oblast.

Madrid has its own autonomous region, including a regional parliament even though Spain is a unitary state.

Paris and the Lyon Metropolis are their own departments in France.

The capital city of Bucharest is also a county within Romania.

Kyiv and Sevastopol have status of city with special status in Ukraine.

Moscow and Saint Petersburg, the biggest cities in Russia, have a federal city status. Following the 2014 annexation of Crimea by the Russian Federation, the city of Sevastopol is also administered as a federal city, though Ukraine and most of the UN member countries continue to regard Sevastopol as a city with special status within Ukraine.

In the United Kingdom, London secessionism gathered some momentum following the Brexit referendum, when voters in Greater London (which is a region and county of England) voted to remain in the EU, in contrast with the rest of England in general.

Apart from Greater London, Greater Manchester is also its own county within England with its own elected mayor. While England has other regions with directly elected mayors, few of these areas correspond neatly to a recognised built-up area.

==== German-speaking countries ====
In Germany there are two cities — Berlin and Hamburg — that are Bundesländer in themselves (thus, they are city-states within a federal system). The Free Hanseatic City of Bremen is also a city-state, comprising two cities: Bremen and Bremerhaven. At the district level, many large and medium-sized cities form their own district-free cities (German: Kreisfreie Städte).

The city of Vienna is a federal state within the Republic of Austria. As in Germany, many large and medium-sized cities in Austria are separate from the regular districts, instead forming their own statutory cities (German: Statutarstädte).

One of the cantons of Switzerland, Basel-Stadt, is a city-state.

=== North America ===
There are no city-states in North America. The District of Columbia in the United States and Ciudad de México (CDMX) in Mexico are federal government districts and not ordinary municipalities. As such, they are subject to the direct authority, respectively, of the U.S. and Mexican federal governments. The residents of Washington, D.C. did not elect their own mayor and city council until 1972, when the United States Congress extended home rule to the city. However, the actions of the mayor and city council must still be approved, at least retroactively, by Congress, and no legislation passed by the Government of the District of Columbia can take effect until and unless the U.S. Congress approves it.

==== Canada ====
Urban secession is one of many possible solutions pondered by some Canadian cities as they contemplate their problems. It is one that is considered politically useful because of the strong secessionist movement in Quebec, as well as the weaker secessionist movements in Newfoundland (formerly independent), Alberta and British Columbia.

In Quebec, with a secessionist movement and linguistic dichotomy, the division of a newly independent Quebec has been a strong undercurrent, with some having a Province of Montreal remaining in Canada, sometimes containing only the West Island and the West Shore of Montreal.

For many decades, the urban communities of Toronto, Montreal and Vancouver have been configured separately from their respective provinces, for purposes of apportioning Members of Parliament after the national censuses conducted every five years.

==== United States ====
Various proposals have been made for New York City to secede from New York State. On a lower level, some states permit or have permitted a city to secede from its county and become a county-equivalent jurisdiction in its own right. Whether the new county-equivalent jurisdiction is considered to be a consolidated city-county like Philadelphia, Pennsylvania or San Francisco, California or an independent city like St. Louis, Missouri is a matter for each such state to decide. In November 2018, the Georgia General Assembly allowed voters in a wealthy enclave of Stockbridge, Georgia to decide if they wanted to secede, which they then declined to do. In Ohio, hundreds of cities and villages have withdrawn from their surrounding townships by forming paper townships.

=== Oceania ===
The 2007 Royal Commission on Auckland Governance was set up by the New Zealand Government to investigate possible changes to the administration of Auckland. The city was in 2009 named as the country's only supercity with the merging of several former councils, and in 2010 the Auckland Region became a unitary authority governed by the Auckland Council. Suggestion has since been made that the region could become an independent city state.

== See also ==
- Libertarian municipalism
- Free City of Danzig
- Italian Regency of Carnaro
- Localism (politics)
