= Jennifer Maccarone =

Canadian politician

Jennifer Maccarone MNA

Member of the National Assembly of Quebec for Westmount–Saint-Louis
- Incumbent
- Assumed office October 1, 2018
- Preceded by: Jacques Chagnon

Personal details
- Born: Montreal
- Party: Quebec Liberal Party
- Education: Marianopolis College McGill University
- Profession: Entrepreneur

Jennifer Maccarone is a Canadian politician in the province of Quebec. Maccarone was elected to the National Assembly of Quebec in the 2018 provincial election. She represents the electoral district of Westmount–Saint-Louis as a member of the Quebec Liberal Party. As of September 7, 2024, she serves as the Official Opposition Critic for Family, Public Security, 2SLGBTQIA+ Community, Fight Against Racism, and Mauricie.

== Early life ==
Maccarone studied at Marianopolis College and McGill University. She began her career as an entrepreneur in marketing and communications, gaining over twenty years of experience in the industry.

== Political career ==
Her career in public service began with Quebec's English school boards, as Chair of the Sir Wilfrid Laurier School Board. From 2015 until September 2018, she served as the President of the Québec English School Boards Association.

A mother of two autistic children, Maccarone was designated as the first politician in Canada to hold the responsibility for people on the Autism Spectrum. In the November 2019, she proposed that the National Assembly's Health and Social Services Committee study services for young people with autism as they transition to adulthood.

Maccarone has served as the Official Opposition Critic for Families and for People Living with a Handicap or on the Autism Spectrum and the Official Opposition Critic for LGBTQ2 Rights.

In February 2020, Maccarone became the first elected official of the National Assembly to hold the official title of Critic for LGBTQ2 Rights. She is also the first elected member of the Quebec Liberal Party to openly describe themselves as LGBTQ2.

== Electoral record ==
=== Provincial ===
2026 Quebec general election: Westmount–Saint-Louis
** Preliminary results — Not yet official **
Party	Candidate	Votes	%	±%
Liberal	Jennifer Maccarone	14,532	59.89	
Québec solidaire	Olivier Sylvestre	3,729	15.37	
Conservative	Guy Diotte	2,483	10.23	
Parti Québécois	Victoria Piscina	1,801	7.42	
Coalition Avenir Québec	Karim Abi Haila	816	3.36	
Green	Hailey Roop	432	1.78	
Canadian	Maryam Kamali Nezhad	290	1.20	
Communist	Kaity Zozula	107	0.44	
Parti nul	Marc A. Lefebvre	74	0.30	
Total valid votes				
Total rejected ballots				
Turnout			45.98	
Electors on the lists			–	–
Liberal hold		Swing		
Source: Élections Québec

2022 Quebec general election: Westmount-Saint-Louis
Party	Candidate	Votes	%	±%
Liberal	Jennifer Maccarone	10,576	50.48	-16.23
Québec solidaire	David Touchette	2,687	12.82	+2.57
Coalition Avenir Québec	Maria-Luisa Torres-Piaggio	2,112	10.08	+0.40
Conservative	Katya Rossokhata	1,930	9.21	+7.01
Parti Québécois	Florence Racicot	1,267	6.05	+0.98
Canadian	Colin Standish	1,029	4.91	–
Bloc Montreal	Heidi Small	735	3.51	–
Green	Sam Kuhn	616	2.94	-0.41
Total valid votes		20,952	99.27	–
Total rejected ballots		155	0.73	–
Turnout		21,107	44.99	-3.47
Electors on the lists		46,919	–	–
Liberal hold		Swing		
Source(s) "2022 provincial general election results". Élections Québec.

2018 Quebec general election: Westmount-Saint-Louis
Party	Candidate	Votes	%	±%
Liberal	Jennifer Maccarone	14,547	66.71	-16.49
Québec solidaire	Ekaterina Piskunova	2,236	10.25	+4.01
Coalition Avenir Québec	Michelle Morin	2,110	9.68	
Parti Québécois	J. Marion Benoit	1,105	5.07	-1.46
Green	Samuel Dajakran Kuhn	730	3.35	-0.67
New Democratic	Nicholas Peter Lawson	598	2.74	
Conservative	Mikey Colangelo Lauzon	479	2.20	
Total valid votes		21,805	99.19	
Total rejected ballots		178	0.81	
Turnout		21,983	48.47	
Eligible voters		45,352		
Liberal hold		Swing		-10.25
Source(s) "Rapport des résultats officiels du scrutin". Élections Québec.
