= Westmount–Saint-Louis =

Provincial electoral district in Quebec, Canada

Coordinates: 45.496°N 73.584°W

Quebec electoral district
- Location in Montreal

Provincial electoral district
- Legislature: National Assembly of Quebec
MNA
Jennifer Maccarone
Liberal
- District created: 1992
- First contested: 1994
- Last contested: 2026

Demographics
- Population (2011): 65,905
- Electors (2014): 39,736
- Area (km²): 11.1
- Pop. density (per km²): 5,937.4
- Census division: Montreal (part)
- Census subdivision(s): Montreal (part), Westmount

Westmount–Saint-Louis is a provincial electoral district in the Montreal region of Quebec, Canada, that elects members to the National Assembly of Quebec. It comprises the city of Westmount as well as parts of the Le Plateau-Mont-Royal and Ville-Marie boroughs of Montreal, including most of downtown.

It was created for the 1994 election from parts of Saint-Louis, Westmount and Sainte-Anne electoral districts.

In the change from the 2001 to the 2011 electoral map, it lost a very small amount of territory to the Saint-Henri–Sainte-Anne electoral district.

== Linguistic demographics ==
- Allophone: 38.9%
- Anglophone: 37.0%
- Francophone: 24.1%

== Members of the National Assembly ==
Legislature	Years	Member	Party
Riding created from Saint-Louis, Westmount and Sainte-Anne
35th	1994–1998	Jacques Chagnon	Liberal
36th	1998–2003	Jacques Chagnon	Liberal
37th	2003–2007	Jacques Chagnon	Liberal
38th	2007–2008	Jacques Chagnon	Liberal
39th	2008–2012	Jacques Chagnon	Liberal
40th	2012–2014	Jacques Chagnon	Liberal
41st	2014–2018	Jacques Chagnon	Liberal
42nd	2018–2022	Jennifer Maccarone	Liberal
43rd	2022–2026	Jennifer Maccarone	Liberal
44th	2026–Present	Jennifer Maccarone	Liberal

== Election results ==
2026 Quebec general election
** Preliminary results — Not yet official **
Party	Candidate	Votes	%	±%
Liberal	Jennifer Maccarone	14,532	59.89	
Québec solidaire	Olivier Sylvestre	3,729	15.37	
Conservative	Guy Diotte	2,483	10.23	
Parti Québécois	Victoria Piscina	1,801	7.42	
Coalition Avenir Québec	Karim Abi Haila	816	3.36	
Green	Hailey Roop	432	1.78	
Canadian	Maryam Kamali Nezhad	290	1.20	
Communist	Kaity Zozula	107	0.44	
Parti nul	Marc A. Lefebvre	74	0.30	
Total valid votes				
Total rejected ballots				
Turnout			45.98	
Electors on the lists			–	–
Liberal hold		Swing		
Source: Élections Québec

2022 Quebec general election
Party	Candidate	Votes	%	±%
Liberal	Jennifer Maccarone	10,576	50.48	-16.23
Québec solidaire	David Touchette	2,687	12.82	+2.57
Coalition Avenir Québec	Maria-Luisa Torres-Piaggio	2,112	10.08	+0.40
Conservative	Katya Rossokhata	1,930	9.21	+7.01
Parti Québécois	Florence Racicot	1,267	6.05	+0.98
Canadian	Colin Standish	1,029	4.91	–
Bloc Montreal	Heidi Small	735	3.51	–
Green	Sam Kuhn	616	2.94	-0.41
Total valid votes		20,952	99.27	–
Total rejected ballots		155	0.73	–
Turnout		21,107	44.99	-3.47
Electors on the lists		46,919	–	–
Liberal hold		Swing		
Source(s) "2022 provincial general election results". Élections Québec.

2018 Quebec general election
Party	Candidate	Votes	%	±%
Liberal	Jennifer Maccarone	14,547	66.71	-16.49
Québec solidaire	Ekaterina Piskunova	2,236	10.25	+4.01
Coalition Avenir Québec	Michelle Morin	2,110	9.68	
Parti Québécois	J. Marion Benoit	1,105	5.07	-1.46
Green	Samuel Dajakran Kuhn	730	3.35	-0.67
New Democratic	Nicholas Peter Lawson	598	2.74	
Conservative	Mikey Colangelo Lauzon	479	2.20	
Total valid votes		21,805	99.19	
Total rejected ballots		178	0.81	
Turnout		21,983	48.47	
Eligible voters		45,352		
Liberal hold		Swing		-10.25
Source(s) "Rapport des résultats officiels du scrutin". Élections Québec.

2014 Quebec general election
Party	Candidate	Votes	%	±%
Liberal	Jacques Chagnon	20,297	83.20	+15.51
Parti Québécois	Denise Laroche	1,594	6.53	-0.93
Québec solidaire	Mélissa Desjardins	1,523	6.24	-0.17
Green	Lisa Julie Cahn	981	4.02	+0.09
Total valid votes		24,395	98.98	–
Total rejected ballots		252	1.02	–
Turnout		24,647	62.03	+2.59
Electors on the lists		39,736	–	–

2012 Quebec general election
Party	Candidate	Votes	%	±%
Liberal	Jacques Chagnon	15,774	67.69	-7.48
Coalition Avenir Québec	Johnny Kairouz	3,056	13.11	+10.17*
Parti Québécois	Marc-André Bahl	1,739	7.46	-2.87
Québec solidaire	Mélissa Desjardins	1,493	6.41	+2.25
Green	Lisa Julie Cahn	916	3.93	-3.47
Option nationale	Benoit Guérin	230	0.99	–
No designation	Pierre JC Allard	94	0.40	–
Total valid votes		23,302	99.34	–
Total rejected ballots		154	0.66	–
Turnout		23,456	59.44	+22.63
Electors on the lists		39,462	–	–

* Result compared to Action démocratique

2008 Quebec general election
Party	Candidate	Votes	%	±%
Liberal	Jacques Chagnon	11,108	75.17	+7.58
Parti Québécois	Daniella Johnson-Meneghini	1,527	10.33	+2.01
Green	Patrick D'Aoust	1,094	7.40	-4.39
Québec solidaire	Nadia Alexan	615	4.16	+0.08
Action démocratique	Léonidas Priftakis	434	2.94	-4.92
Total valid votes		14,778	99.13	–
Total rejected ballots		130	0.87	–
Turnout		14,908	36.81	-12.42
Electors on the lists		40,500	–	–

2007 Quebec general election
Party	Candidate	Votes	%	±%
Liberal	Jacques Chagnon	13,368	67.59	-12.64
Green	Patrick D'Aoust	2,331	11.79	–
Parti Québécois	Denise Laroche	1,646	8.32	-2.06
Action démocratique	Caroline Morgan	1,554	7.86	+3.66
Québec solidaire	Nadia Alexan	807	4.08	+0.94*
Marxist–Leninist	Nicholas Lin	73	0.37	+0.09
Total valid votes		19,779	99.31	–
Total rejected ballots		137	0.69	–
Turnout		19,916	49.23	-3.63
Electors on the lists		40,455	–	–

* Result compared to UFP

2003 Quebec general election
Party	Candidate	Votes	%	±%
Liberal	Jacques Chagnon	18,330	80.23	+1.06
Parti Québécois	Denise Laroche	2,372	10.38	-3.52
Action démocratique	Nathalie Beaupré	959	4.20	+0.73
UFP	David Fennario	718	3.14	–
Bloc Pot	David John Proctor	223	0.98	–
Equality	Don Donderi	182	0.80	-1.15
People's Front	Diane Johnston	64	0.28	+0.11

1998 Quebec general election
Party	Candidate	Votes	%	±%
Liberal	Jacques Chagnon	26,244	79.17	-0.03
Parti Québécois	Christian D. Armour	4,609	13.90	+0.81
Action démocratique	Christian Thibault	1,150	3.47	+1.25
Equality	Christy McCormick	648	1.95	-0.22
Socialist Democracy	Sorem Kvist	224	0.68	-0.03
Natural Law	Allen Faguy	130	0.39	+0.09
Communist	Jacques Hardy	89	0.27	–
People's Front	Louis Lang	56	0.17	-0.01

1995 Quebec referendum
Side	Votes	%
Non	38,295	84.77
Oui	6,880	15.23

1994 Quebec general election
Party	Candidate	Votes	%
Liberal	Jacques Chagnon	26,478	79.20
Parti Québécois	François Dagenais	4,378	13.09
Action démocratique	Valérie Tremblay	741	2.22
Equality	Brent Tyler	727	2.17
Green	Bernard Cooper	444	1.33
New Democrat	Armand Vaillancourt	239	0.71
CANADA!	Rudolph Scalzo	137	0.41
Natural Law	Allen Faguy	100	0.30
People's Front	Arnold August	61	0.18
Economic	Gérald Bouffard	55	0.16
Republic of Canada	Gilles Gervais	49	0.15
Independent (CL)	Michel Prairie	24	0.07

== See also ==
- List of Quebec provincial electoral districts
- Canadian provincial electoral districts
