= Special city =

Special city refers to:

- Special cities of Korea (disambiguation), province-independent/province-level cities
- Special cities of Japan (since 2000), a city with a population of at least 200,000 that is delegated functions normally carried out by prefectural governments
- Special wards of Tokyo (since 1947), city-independent/city-level wards
- Special cities of China, now known as the municipalities of China

== See also ==
- City with special status, the cities of Kyiv and Sevastopol, Ukraine
