= Bloc Montreal =

Bloc Montreal Bloc Montréal
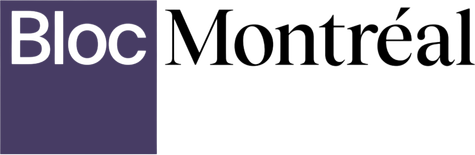
- Leader: Balarama Holness
- Founded: June 7, 2022
- Dissolved: February 21, 2026
- Headquarters: Montreal, Quebec, Canada
- Ideology: Quebec federalism Montreal city state Official bilingualism Minority rights
- Political position: Big tent
- Colours: Purple and white (unofficial)
- Seats in the National Assembly: 0 / 125

Website
- www.blocmtl.com

The Bloc Montreal (French: Bloc Montréal) was a provincial political party in Quebec. It represented the interests of Montreal residents. The party ran thirteen candidates in the Greater Montreal Area during the 2022 Quebec general election.

On February 21, 2026, party leader Balarama Holness disbanded the party and encouraged its remaining supporters to migrate to the Quebec Liberal Party.

== Policies ==
Bloc Montreal leader Balarama Holness indicated that the party supported the idea of Montreal being a bilingual city state.

== Election results ==
=== 2022 Quebec general elections ===
Bloc Montreal received 7,744 votes in the 2022 Quebec general election, with a share of 0.2%.

== See also ==
- Equality Party
- Canadian Party of Quebec
- Partition of Quebec
- Proposal for the Province of Montreal
