= Jacques Chagnon =

Canadian politician

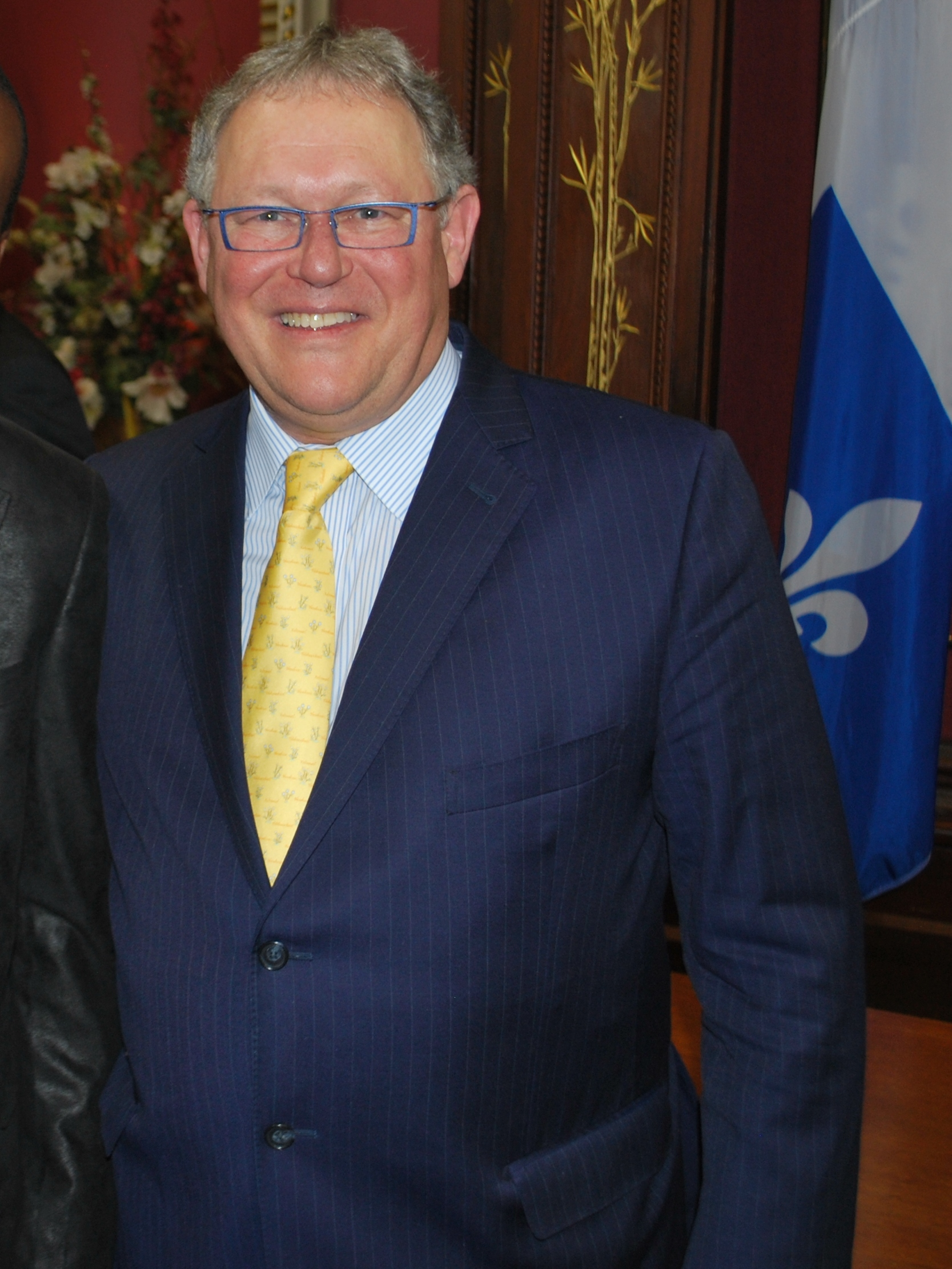
- Jacques Chagnon during a ceremony to award the National Order of Quebec in 2013.

45th President of the National Assembly of Quebec
- In office April 5, 2011 – November 26, 2018
- Preceded by: Yvon Vallières
- Succeeded by: François Paradis

Member of the National Assembly of Quebec for Westmount–Saint-Louis (Saint-Louis; 1985–1994)
- In office December 2, 1985 – October 1, 2018
- Preceded by: Harry Blank
- Succeeded by: Jennifer Maccarone

Personal details
- Born: August 28, 1952 (age 73) Montreal, Quebec, Canada
- Party: Liberal

Jacques Chagnon (French pronunciation: [ʒak ʃaɲɔ̃]; born August 28, 1952) is a retired Canadian politician who served in the National Assembly of Quebec from 1985 to 2018. A member of Quebec Liberal Party, he was appointed Minister of Education in 1994, when his party went back on to form government in 2003, he was appointed Minister of Public Security until 2005.

He was President of the National Assembly of Quebec from 2011 to 2018.

He represented the electoral districts of Saint-Louis from 1985 to 1994 and Westmount–Saint-Louis from 1994 to 2018 as a member of the Quebec Liberal Party (QLP). He retired from political life in 2018, after serving more than 33 years as a member of the National Assembly.

== Background and early life ==
Born in Montreal on August 28, 1952, Jacques Chagnon has spent his entire life in Boucherville. He is married to Sylvie Bélisle and has three daughters: Marie-Claude Chagnon, Sophie Roberge and Stéphanie Chagnon.

He studied at Dawson College and then at Concordia University where he graduated with a bachelor's degree in political science and history. He then studied law and political science at the University of Montreal.

He was elected Commissioner of the Saint-Exupéry School Board in 1975, he became vice-president of the Regional School Board of Chambly, becoming its president in 1978. As President, he created the first international public school in the world the Macdonald-Cartier school and launched the creation of the first sports-study schools in Quebec.

In 1982, he was elected President of the Fédération des Commissions scolaire du Québec, which he headed until 1985, the year of his election to the National Assembly.

== Political career ==
Spotted by Robert Bourassa, he was elected to the National Assembly for the first time during the 1985 Quebec general election. He was then Member of National Assembly for Saint-Louis, a riding that took the name of Westmount–Saint-Louis in 1994. He became a parliamentary assistant and a member of the Treasury Board. He will be re-elected without interruption in the riding of Westmount-Saint Louis until his retirement from political life in 2018.

He was the Minister of Education in the government of Daniel Johnson from January 11, 1994, to September 26, 1994, when the QLP was defeated in the 1994 election. When the QLP retook power in 2003, he was appointed to cabinet by Premier Jean Charest as Minister of Public Security from April 29, 2003, to February 18, 2005. During his time as Minister of Public Security, he had to deal with the Kanesatake crisis. Chagnon was the chair the committee on education in the National Assembly until 2007 and was named the Second Vice-president of the National Assembly after the elections.

From 2007 to 2011, he was second vice-president of the National Assembly. During this period, he participated in many delegations such as that of the Parliamentary Assembly of the Francophonie. From April 5, 2011, and until the end of his political career, he served as President of the National Assembly.

On October 31, 2017, he publicly took offense in a speech to Parliament that the Permanent Anti-Corruption Unit (UPAC) arrested MP Guy Ouellette without charges being laid six days later. "Let's accuse or apologize.” Otherwise, this Assembly will have to take steps to defend the very foundations of its existence.

Chagnon was first elected in the riding of Saint-Louis in the 1985 election and was re-elected again in 1989. He was then elected in the new riding of Westmount–Saint-Louis during the 1994 election. He was subsequently re-elected in this riding in the 1998, 2003, 2007, 2008 and 2012 elections. On April 5, 2011, Chagnon was appointed Speaker of the National Assembly, serving until his retirement in 2018.

For almost eight years as president, Jacques Chagnon was heavily involved in parliamentary diplomacy. He twice chaired the APF (Parliamentary Assembly of La Francophonie), which brings together 90 countries dedicated to the development of La Francophonie.

During his presidency, the National Assembly of Quebec concluded new bilateral relations agreements with Newfoundland, Massachusetts, Louisiana, Morocco, the province of Shandong (China) as well as the prefecture of Kyoto (Japan). These were in addition to the others that have been concluded since 1964.

On June 15, 2018, he announced his retirement from political life after 33 years of service as a Member of Parliament.

== Honours ==
- 2011 : Grand Cross of the Order of the Pleiade
- Commander of the Order of the Pleiade
- Officer of the Legion of Honor (France), 2015.
- Merit Pierre Boucher (highest distinction awarded by the city of Boucherville to one of these citizens).

== See also ==
- Politics of Quebec
- Quebec general elections
- Quebec Liberal Party

== Electoral record (partial) ==
1989 Quebec general election: Saint-Louis
Party	Candidate	Votes	%
Liberal	Jacques Chagnon	9,034	40.58
Parti Québécois	Ariane Véronneau	6,659	29.91
Equality	José Di Bona	3,815	17.14
Green	François Chevalier	1,804	8.10
New Democratic	Kathleen Parewick	457	2.05
Commonwealth of Canada	Denis Tremblay	143	0.64
Independent	Philippe Champagne	133	0.60
Marxist–Leninist	Hélène Héroux	114	0.51
Workers	Jean-Claude St-Amour	101	0.45
Total valid votes		22,260	100.00
Rejected and declined votes		374	
Turnout		22,634	65.53
Electors on the lists		34,541	
Source: Official Results, Le Directeur général des élections du Québec.

Political offices
Preceded by Lucienne Robillard (Liberal)	Minister of Education (Quebec); 1994	Succeeded by Jean Garon (PQ)
Preceded by Serge Ménard (PQ)	Minister of Public Security (Quebec); 2003–2005	Succeeded by Jacques Dupuis (Liberal)
