= Partition of Quebec =

Hypothetical scenarios upon Quebec independence

The partition of Quebec refers to the proposed division or secession of specific regions within the province, primarily discussed as a potential scenario if Quebec were to secede from Canada. While the topic was not a primary focus during either the 1980 or 1995 referendums on Quebec sovereignty, it became a central issue in national unity debates for approximately two years following the 1995 vote. Since that period, the subject has occasionally re-emerged in political discourse, such as during the 2007 provincial election.

== Legal context ==
Any debate or proposal regarding a future partition of Quebec must be looked at in light of the Canadian Constitution (British North America Act, 1871), which stipulates that the limits of a province may not be increased, diminished or otherwise altered without the consent of the legislature of that province, a constitutional provision that would need the consent of the legislatures of all ten provinces to be modified.

In the event that Quebec were to legally secede from Canada, international law as it stands does not recognize the right of entities within a de jure sovereign state to unilaterally secede from that state by invoking the right to self-determination.

== Partition proposals ==
What area would an independent Quebec occupy? That of the Province as it is today without any territorial waters? That of 1867 i.e., the territory without the 1898 and 1912 annexes? That of 1984 with the addition of Newfoundland's Labrador?

— A.-L. Sanguin, 1984

Broadly speaking, partition proposals have tended to fall into three categories:

1. New borders based on a return to historical boundaries that predate the Confederation of 1867.

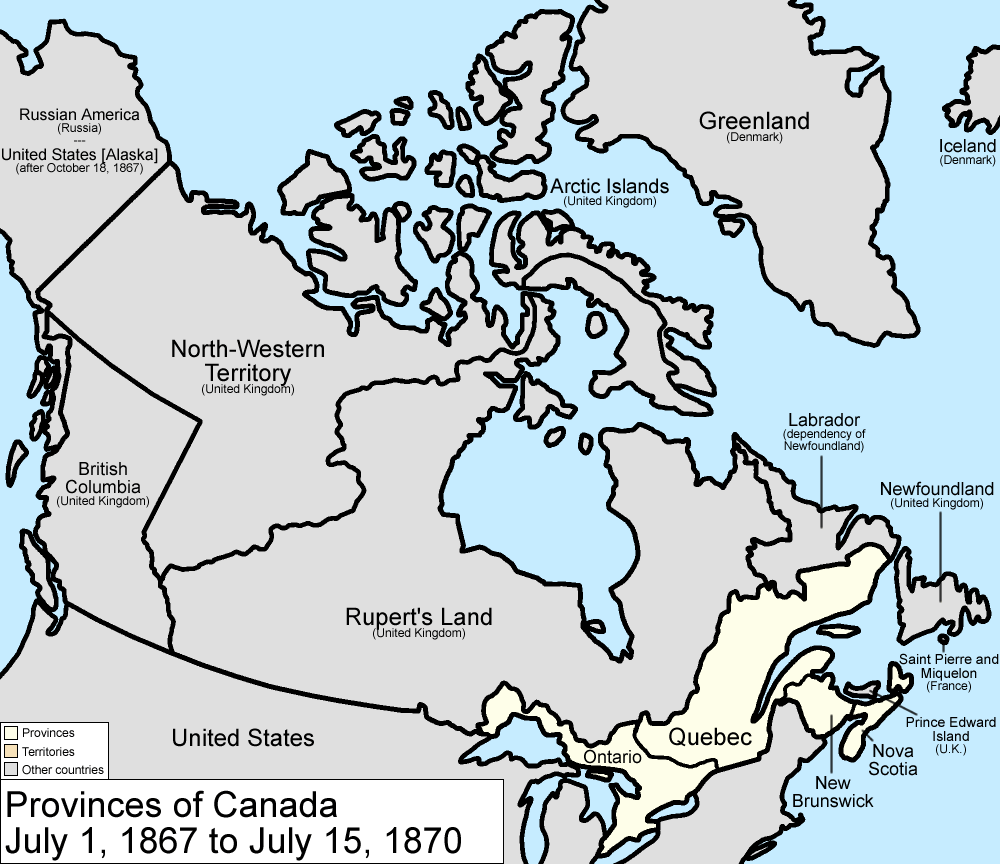
Provinces of Canada at Confederation in 1867

The logic here is that the separation of Quebec would represent an end to a constitutional deal in which Quebec was granted stewardship over certain lands which would revert to their former sovereign owners if Quebec were to leave Canada.
For example, in his 1991 book Who Gets Ungava?, David Varty notes that the northern two-thirds of Quebec’s current territory had formerly been a part of the lands owned by the Hudson's Bay Company, and that it had been transferred to Quebec by means of two acts of the Canadian Parliament, in 1898 and 1912 respectively. For this reason, if Quebec were to secede, the transfer would be legally void:

Quebec was a province of Canada at the time that the Ungava territory was transferred to Quebec’s jurisdiction... Had Quebec been moving to become an independent country, the transfer of jurisdiction would not have taken place. There was an implied condition that the Province of Quebec was going to remain part of Canada. Any attempt to move to independence would constitute a breach of that implied condition attached to the transfer.

2. New borders that would create a ‘land bridge’ between New Brunswick and Ontario
This could be set up to prevent Canada’s remaining nine provinces from being split into two non-contiguous chunks of territory separated by about 300 miles (480 km) of foreign (Quebec) soil. The term sometimes used for this eventuality is "Pakistanization", in reference to the way in which East Pakistan and West Pakistan were separated by hundreds of miles of foreign soil, following independence in 1947, with East Pakistan eventually separating and becoming its own country, Bangladesh, in 1971. The fear is that Canada would be unworkable if its four Atlantic provinces were to become an exclave.
3. New borders based on the preferences of local populations.
The logic of this approach is that, if Quebecers as a whole have the right to determine by majority vote whether to separate from Canada, then by extension the residents of regions within Quebec ought to be accorded the same right to separate from Quebec and to remain within Canada. The areas of Quebec that have been mentioned as likely to choose to remain in Canada include predominantly English-speaking municipalities on the western part of the Island of Montreal, Northern Quebec, the Eastern Townships and the Pontiac region in the Outaouais. In his 1992 book Canada Remapped: How the Partition of Quebec Will Reshape the Nation, Scott Reid argues in favour of partition as determined by local populations and largely dismisses the first two lines of thought on partition listed above.

== History of the partition debate ==
The partition movement dates from May 1976, when William Shaw, a candidate for the leadership of the Union Nationale, proposed the idea in a series of interviews with journalists. Writing several years later, Shaw recounted one of these interviews: "I said to the journalist at that time, ‘I want to introduce a new word into the lexicon of Canadian politics—PARTITION. The threat of partition will prevent separation.’"

In December 1976, an organization called the "Preparatory Committee for an Eleventh Province" was formed in Montreal. This group contained some individuals who believed, along with Shaw, that the threat of a partition in which some parts of Quebec would remain within Canada would weaken support for separation.

Other members of the Preparatory Committee sought to create a new province out of the linguistically mixed parts of Quebec even if Quebec were to remain in Canada, in order to create a new, bilingual province. This faction within the early partition movement bears some resemblance to the movements that have arisen from time to time in parts of some Canadian provinces to break away and form new provinces. For example, also in the 1970s, there was a movement, led by the Parti Acadien, to create a new Acadian province out of northern New Brunswick.

Shortly before the 1980 referendum on Quebec secession, Prime Minister Pierre Trudeau remarked, "Si le Canada est divisible, le Québec doit être aussi divisible." (This translates as, "If Canada is divisible, Quebec must also be divisible.") Apparently taking their inspiration from this statement, Shaw and co-author Lionel Albert published a book on the subject by the end of the year. Partition: The Price of Quebec’s Independence outlined a plan for the excision of three slices of territory from a newly independent Quebec republic:

- The northern two-thirds of the province would be retained by Canada following independence, on the basis that the territory had been assigned (not ceded) to the Province of Quebec in two steps, in 1898 and 1912;
- All Quebec territory south of the St. Lawrence River would also be retained by Canada, on the basis of the 18th-century claim of the then-colonies of New York and Massachusetts to these lands, which had been abandoned by the British Crown only after Quebec had been captured by Britain in 1759;
- The Pontiac region of west Quebec, the lower north shore of the Gulf of St. Lawrence and the western part of the island of Montreal would remain in Canada on the basis that local populations are predominantly non-Francophone, and presumably therefore would be Canadian rather than Québécois in their loyalties.

Shaw and Albert calculated that the resulting independent Quebec republic would contain somewhat less than one-quarter of the province's total landmass, have a population of around 2.9 million, and would be about 97% French-speaking. The parts remaining in Canada would contain over three million residents, of whom about two-thirds would be French-speaking. But they also seem to have believed that their scenario would never play out. As they put it, "Such a country will not be proclaimed—ever. The French-Canadian people would not have it. They would rather have a large province than a small country. That is why separation will not happen."

The Grand Council of the Crees and the Inuit of Nunavik in Northern Quebec have both said that they will keep their lands in Canada should Quebec secede, invoking international laws that guarantee their right to self-determination. In 1995, a Cree referendum voted 95% in favour of staying in Canada should Quebec secede.

Following the narrow loss by the separatist side in the October 1995 referendum on secession, there was a widespread belief that another referendum would be held in the near future. For this reason, potential players began to take actions that would strengthen their positions in the coming unity crisis. Forty-three municipal councils in Quebec, including many on the western part of the Island of Montreal, passed resolutions expressing their will to stay in Canada.

In 1997, Denzil Spence, the mayor of Allumette Island, a small west Quebec municipality on the Ontario border, approached the county councils in several nearby Ontario counties with the following pro-partition resolution which had previously been endorsed by Quebec's Equality Party:

Resolved: Regardless of the outcome of any referendum on the independence of Quebec conducted by the government of the province of Quebec, the Government of Canada guarantee forthwith the rights of loyal citizens of Canada, where they form the majority in any provincial riding in Quebec, to remain citizens of Canada, territorially part of the Canadian nation and people, one and indivisible.

Between March and August 1997, the resolution was endorsed by county councils in Renfrew County, Frontenac County, Lanark County, and Stormont, Dundas and Glengarry United Counties, but it was rejected by the council of Prescott-Russell County.

A similar resolution, circulated by a group called the Quebec Committee for Canada, was endorsed by New Brunswick premier Frank McKenna in early summer 1997, and shortly afterwards by New Brunswick's Union of Municipalities, representing about 40 predominantly anglophone municipal councils. However the parallel francophone organization, the Association of New Brunswick Municipalities, rejected the partition resolution. Quebec Premier Lucien Bouchard responded to Premier McKenna's letter of endorsement with a letter of his own, defending Quebec's right to secede with its territory intact. This in turn provoked an open letter from federal Intergovernmental Affairs Minister Stéphane Dion, arguing that partition was a legitimate option. Finally, on August 14, Quebec's deputy premier, Bernard Landry, responded with an open letter in Le Droit, accusing partitionists of being anti-democratic.

Shortly after these events, the sovereigntist provincial government of Premier Bouchard enacted a law forcing many of Quebec's municipalities to merge — and in particular, forcing all of the small non-francophone municipalities on the Island of Montreal to become part of a single francophone-majority municipality covering the entire island. Montreal Gazette columnist Henry Aubin observed shortly afterwards that "many sovereigntists hoped that the merger would boost French and stymie partition.", ignoring the fact that municipalities have no constitutional powers and belong to the province.

== Arguments against partition ==
Quebec sovereigntists and federalist Quebec nationalists generally oppose partition. Partition is chiefly supported by the argument of the right of territorial integrity (intégrité térritoriale) of Quebec. A number of arguments have been advanced in defence of this position.

1. International law guarantees the territorial integrity of Quebec. The most precise expression of the argument that international law would guarantee a sovereign Quebec's right to its current boundaries was given, in 1992, from the Bélanger-Campeau Commission, by a panel of international law experts (Thomas Franck, Rosalyn Higgins, Alain Pellet, Malcolm Shaw, Christian Tomuschat) commissioned by the government of Quebec in the aftermath of the failed Meech Lake Accord. They responded to the following two questions on the territorial integrity and the potential partition of an independent Quebec, which were posed by a special commission of the Quebec National Assembly:

Question No. 1: “Assuming that Quebec were to attain sovereignty, would the boundaries of a sovereign Quebec remain the same as its present boundaries, including the territories attributed to Quebec under the federal legislation of 1898 and 1912, or would they be those of the Province of Quebec at the time of the creation of the Canadian Federation in 1867?”

Question No 2: “Assuming that Quebec were to attain sovereignty, would international law enforce the principle of territorial integrity (or uti possidetis) over any claims aiming to dismember the territory of Quebec, and more particularly:

“(a) claims of the Natives of Quebec invoking the right to self-determination within the meaning of international law;
“(b) claims of the anglophone minority, particularly in respect of those regions of Quebec in which this minority is concentrated;
“(c) claims of the inhabitants of certain border regions of Quebec, regardless of ethnic origin?"

The panellists answered with their opinions as follows:

Answer No. 1: “If Quebec were to attain independence, the borders of a sovereign Quebec would be its present boundaries and would include the territories attributed to Quebec by the federal legislation of 1898 and 1912, unless otherwise agreed to by the province before independence, or as between the two States thereafter.”

Answer No. 2: “If Quebec were to attain independence, the principle of legal continuity (absence of a vacuum juris) would allow the territorial integrity of Quebec, guaranteed both by Canadian constitutional law and public international law, to be asserted over any claims aimed at dismembering the territory of Quebec, whether they stem from:

“- the Natives of Quebec, who enjoy all the rights belonging to minorities, in addition to those recognized in indigenous peoples by present-day international law, but without giving rise to the right to secede;
“- the anglophone minority for whom the protection provided by international law has no territorial effect; or
“- persons residing in certain border regions of Quebec, who, as such, enjoy no particular protection under international law."

“These conclusions are reinforced by the applicability of the principle of the succession to the existing territorial limits at the time of independence.”

This line of argumentation is supported by "Uti possidetis juris" which states, as per customary international law, that newly formed sovereign states should have the same borders that their preceding dependent area had before their independence.

2. Quebec is a nation, and therefore it has the collective right to be an independent nation-state, and also a collective right not to be partitioned or divided. There may be corollaries to this argument. First, Canada including French-speaking and English-speaking Canadians would be considered not to be a nation, and hence its territorial integrity does not warrant the protection given under international law to the existing borders of nation-states. Second, the fact that English-speaking Canadians living in Quebec are linked by language to another nation (the rest of Canada) does not mean that they have the right to remain within Canada in their homes if the province secedes. This was the argument presented by Premier Lucien Bouchard when he stated, on January 27, 1996, that "Canada is not a real country."

This argument is also based in international law, more specifically Section b. of Article XI of the Charter of the United Nations, stating:

"Members of the United Nations which have or assume responsibilities for the administration of territories whose peoples have not yet attained a full measure of self-government recognize the principle that the interests of the inhabitants of these territories are paramount, and accept as a sacred trust the obligation to promote to the utmost, within the system of international peace and security established by the present Charter, the well-being of the inhabitants of these territories, and, to this end:

[...]

b. to develop self-government, to take due account of the political aspirations of the peoples, and to assist them in the progressive development of their free political institutions, according to the particular circumstances of each territory and its peoples and their varying stages of advancement; [...]"

Worded otherwise, this means that Quebec, as a distinct nation, has the right to aspirations to form a sovereign state, as well as the right to be supported by the Federal government in this endeavour.

Gérald Larose, the president of the Confederation of National Trade Unions, used this argument to explain why he referred to partition proposals as "racist":

"Asked why he calls the partition movement racist, Larose said, 'cutting up a territory, wherever it's done in the world, is a racist project. They cut according to the backyard and the sidewalks of people, according to their race. This is a racist project.' Asked why this does not apply to the sovereigntist project and Canada, he said, 'There is not one people in Canada. There are two peoples. Quebec is a people and Canada is another people and we have our territory. That is why Canada is divisible, Quebec un-divisible.'"

This argument has also been supported by francophones in provinces outside of Quebec. In the two-year period following the 1995 referendum, when many municipal councils in Ontario and New Brunswick were passing resolutions endorsing the right of individual municipalities within Quebec to leave the province and rejoin Canada, the "partition resolution" was rejected by almost all French-majority municipalities in the two provinces. In the mostly French-speaking Ottawa suburb of Vanier, the council approved the resolution, and later rescinded its approval. Mayor Guy Cousineau explained this reversal to a newspaper reporter by stating "I had letters and calls from many francophones in Nepean, Gloucester, and on the Quebec side." He went on to explain, "We must show solidarity for 'la francophonie' from one ocean to the other. Not just here in Ontario, not just in Quebec, but everywhere in Canada…. Now, it's very clear and certain that we're not in favour of Quebec separation, but there are better ways to encourage Quebecers to remain in Canada."

3. Partition is based on the undemocratic assumption that Quebec is not divisible as long as it is voting "No" to secession, but that it is divisible as soon as it votes "Yes." In 1997, future Parti Québécois leader Bernard Landry expressed this point of view when he wrote,

"The partitionists argue that 'No' voters should have more rights than 'Yes' voters. In 1980 and again in 1995, sovereigntist voters accepted with good grace the majority decision. According to the partitionists, some 'No' voters could ignore democracy, refuse the verdict and change the rules of the game. This would be an intolerable injustice…. [Do] you think that the towns or the regions that voted 'Yes' in 1980 and in 1995 also have the right to break themselves away from Canada? Surely not."

As an example of what ex-premier Bernard Landry explained, it can be established that after the Quebec Referendum of 1995 where the Yes vote lost by a margin of about 0.5% (49.42% Yes, 50.58% No), no attempts to partition were made by the "Yes" voter base, in respect of the referendum. It is an argument based less on legal grounds, and more on moral grounds.

4. Partition is an impractical solution, or is being proposed insincerely even by its advocates. This argument has been advanced by Raymond Villeneuve, a founding member of the FLQ and leader of the Mouvement de libération nationale du Québec (MLNQ), who says,

"They're always threatening us, always, always. Whether it's Brent Tyler, Stephen Scott, William Johnson, William Shaw or whoever. And they're very subtle about it. They say that if we want to divide Canada, then they'll divide Quebec. And they make it sound as though people will accept it. Their real objective is to scare people, but they say, 'We don't want violence. We just won't pay our taxes. We'll use civil disobedience.' "

There is merit in Villeneuve's characterization of partition as being primarily an argument designed to encourage Quebecers to vote against separation in any future referendum on separation. Trudeau's 1980 observation that if Canada is divisible, Quebec is also divisible, was made on the eve of a referendum in which he was attempting to encourage voters to cast their ballots against secession. The first book on the subject, and the one which gave its name to the movement, was 1980's Partition, the Price of Quebec's Independence, by Lionel Albert and William Shaw. The title of this book makes clear its intention to use the threat of territorial losses to dissuade Quebecers from voting in favour of secession. Stephen Scott was even more direct about his intention to use the threat of partition as a means of preventing separation altogether:

"Partition is to Quebec nationalists like rats for Winston Smith in George Orwell's novel 1984 — it is the ultimate fear. That is the only thing they have ever been afraid of: the disintegration of their territory."

By the time of the second referendum on secession, in 1995, not all partition arguments were designed with the intention of causing Quebecers to vote against independence. The referendums by Quebec's Cree and Inuit populations in the days prior to the province's referendum seem to have been designed not to serve as a threat, but rather to provide a clear basis on which to actually carry out the separation of these territories from Quebec, in the event of a provincewide majority in favour of secession.

5. Partition is illegal due to municipalities being entities created by the Quebec National Assembly and therefore, the municipalities cannot hold referendum on separations, because they don't have any constitutional powers.

The fact that municipalities don't have constitutional powers is recognised by the constitution act:

"The Constitution Act, 1867 established the parameters of current federal and provincial relationships with municipalities. Section 92 of the Act sets out the exclusive powers of provincial legislatures in 16 areas, with section 92(8) giving the legislature of each province exclusive responsibility for making laws relating to that province’s municipal institutions. [...] Because local governments are legally subordinate to provincial governments, the only sources of authority and revenue available to municipalities are those that are specifically granted by provincial legislation."

6. Partition is not allowed without the consent of the affected provinces. Section 43 of the Canadian Charter of Rights and Freedoms explicitly states that “any alterations to boundaries between provinces […] only where so authorized by resolutions […] of the legislative assembly of each province to which the amendment applies”

== Popular support / opposition ==
No polling was done on the subject of partition prior to the 1995 referendum on secession, so it is difficult to guess at levels of support. However, during the years following the referendum, a number of polls were conducted, asking Canadians their views on the subject. Different questions sometimes elicited different responses, but certain patterns could nevertheless be distinguished:

Support for partition was relatively low when people were asked, simply, if they favoured “partition” as a concept, but rose rapidly when the pollsters asked whether people or regions should be allowed to choose whether to remain in Canada. For example, one poll published in late September 1997 reported that when Quebecers were asked, “Are you for or against partition?” only 34.4% supported the idea. In another poll conducted at almost the same time, 60% of Quebecers answered “yes” when asked, “Do you believe that any regions of Quebec which want to remain part of Canada have the right to do so?”

Within Quebec, opinion was about evenly divided as to whether parts of the province that wish to remain within Canada should be permitted to do so. However, outside Quebec, a decisive majority believed that parts of Quebec which wish to remain Canadian should be permitted to do so. In a poll conducted five months after the referendum, 48% of Quebecers responded “yes”, and 45% “no” to the question, “If Quebec becomes sovereign, do you think regions of Quebec should have the right to remain part of Canada?” In the rest of Canada, 75% answered “yes” and only 23% answered “no.” In a 1997 poll, 56% of Quebecers and 80% of non-Quebecers felt that “regions” of Quebec should “have the right to stay in Canada” if Quebec were to secede.

Both inside and outside Quebec, there tended to be opposition to any option that hinted of the use of force to settle territorial issues. The strongest opposition to partition came in the answers to a 1996 poll in which respondents were asked whether it would be acceptable “for groups within Quebec to partition the territory and separate from Quebec.” Only 66% of non-Quebecers said this option was acceptable (about 10 - 15% below support levels in other polls), and it was supported by only 25% of Quebecers. Significantly, survey respondents had first been asked whether they agreed with the statement, “If Quebec votes to leave Canada, the federal government should use force to make it stay,” and it seems likely that many survey respondents associated partition with the use of force.

Among both Quebecers and non-Quebecers, support was higher for giving the right to self-determination to Quebec's aboriginals, than it was for giving the same right to non-aboriginals who might want to remain within Canada. For example, in a 1997 poll, 75% of Quebecers and 92% of non-Quebecers agreed that the Cree and Inuit regions of northern Quebec “have the right to stay in Canada.” A 1999 poll showed that 72% of Quebecers found it reasonable that “northern regions with an aboriginal majority could stay in Canada”, while only 49% were willing to accord the same right to regions where a majority had voted No to separation.

No major political party in Quebec supports partition, including federalist parties.

== Provincial election of 2007 ==
During the Quebec provincial election of 2007, Liberal Premier Jean Charest stated that while he personally was opposed to partition, it would emerge as an issue if Quebec voted to secede from Canada. Political rivals Mario Dumont (Action démocratique du Québec) and Andre Boisclair (Parti Québécois) criticized this.

== Pierre-Karl Péladeau controversy, 2015 ==
On 26 November 2015, PQ leader Pierre-Karl Péladeau created controversy when he implied First Nations and other groups could negotiate secession from an independent Quebec. This went against his party's longstanding position than an independent Quebec's borders would remain the same. He later retracted his statement, saying negotiations with First Nations would take place within the context of Quebec's current territory.

== See also ==
- Proposal for the Province of Montreal
- Partitionism
- Balkanization
