= List of proposed provinces and territories of Canada =

Evolution of the borders and names of Canada's provinces and territories over time

Since Canadian Confederation in 1867, there have been several proposals for new Canadian provinces and territories. Since 1982, the current Constitution of Canada requires an amendment ratified by seven provincial legislatures representing at least half of the national population for the creation of a new province while the creation of a new territory requires only an act of Parliament. Because opening up the constitution to amendment could entice provinces to demand other changes too in exchange for such support, this is seen to be a politically unfeasible option. The newest province, Newfoundland and Labrador, joined Canada in 1949 by an act of the British Parliament before the 1982 patriation of the constitution.

== Movements inside Canada ==
There have been movements to create new provinces and territories inside the borders of Canada.

=== Atlantic Canada ===
==== Acadia ====
Approximate map of the most commonly accepted definition of Acadia

The Parti Acadien supported the creation of a new province consisting of the francophone parts of New Brunswick, in tandem with most Acadian Society of New Brunswick members. The party went into the 1978 election with a platform of independence. However, the idea died down after Richard Hatfield and the governing Progressive Conservatives promoted a platform that promised to increase the role of the Acadian people and culture within the province.

==== Cape Breton Island ====
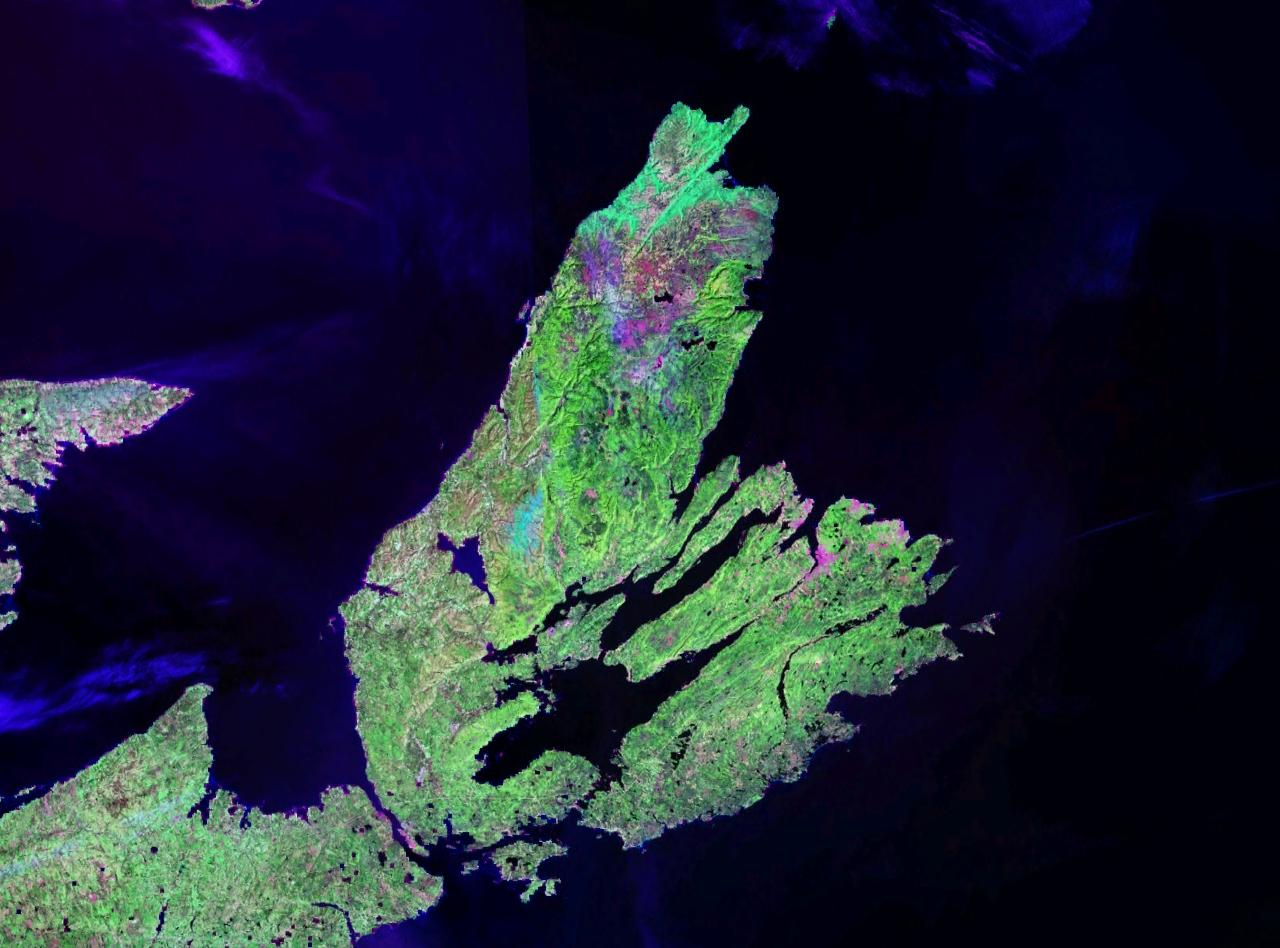
Cape Breton Island, northeast of the Nova Scotia peninsula

In 1784 Cape Breton Island became a separate colony, but it was incorporated back into Nova Scotia in 1820. Provincehood was advocated by the Cape Breton Labour Party from 1982 to 1984.

==== Labrador ====
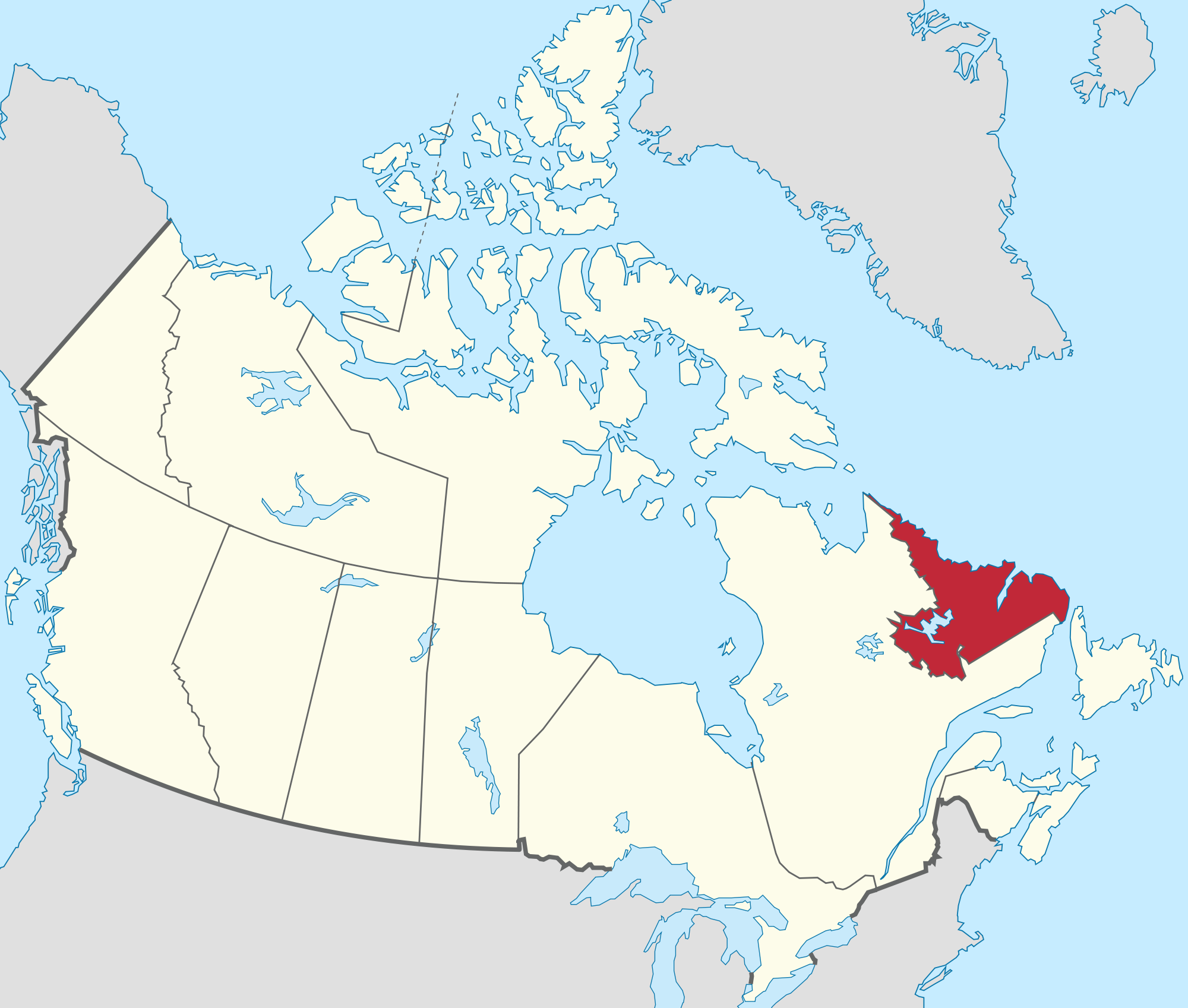
Labrador (red) within Canada

Labrador is the mainland portion of the province of Newfoundland and Labrador. The Labrador Party has campaigned on the platform of a separate province. A similar campaign was held by locals in 2016 with a petition written to the MP on the federal level and the Labrador MHAs on the provincial level, based on claims that the provincial government has been inadequately funding for Labrador's amenities such as roads, in contrast with Newfoundland; but largely benefited from its resources. Neither federal nor provincial representatives responded.

==== Maritime Union ====
The three Maritime Provinces (red) which would make up the proposed merger within Canada

The Maritime Union is a proposed province that would be formed by a merger of the three existing Maritime provinces of Canada: Nova Scotia, Prince Edward Island, and New Brunswick. It would be the fifth-largest Canadian province by population. The Maritime Union has also been expanded to a proposed "Atlantic Union," which would include Newfoundland and Labrador as well.

=== Quebec ===
==== Mohawk territory/province ====
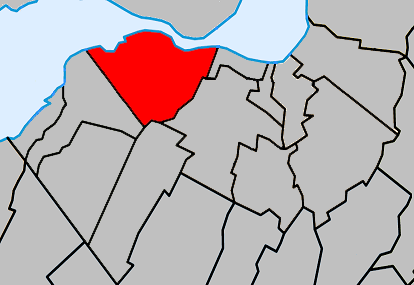
Kahnawake Mohawk Territory, an example of a Mohawk First Nations reserve in Quebec

Before the 1995 Quebec sovereignty referendum, Mohawk leaders asserted a sovereign right to secede from Quebec if Quebec were to secede from Canada. In the CBC Television documentary Breaking Point, premier of Quebec Jacques Parizeau said that if the referendum had succeeded, he would have allowed the Mohawk communities to secede from Quebec on the grounds that they had never given up their sovereign rights.

==== Montreal ====
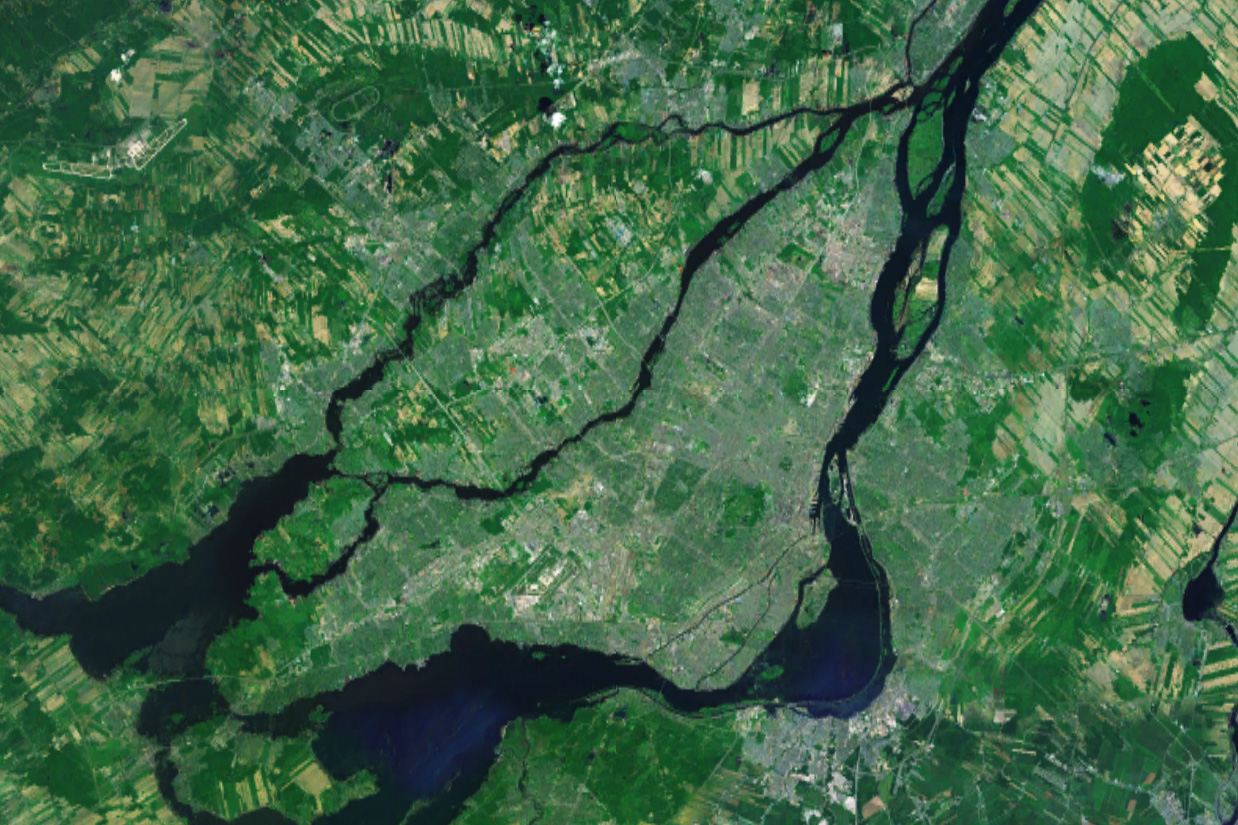
The Island of Montreal

It has been proposed to separate the city of Montreal, its metropolitan area, or its non-francophone parts into a province separate from Quebec. There have been several proposals of that nature since the mid-20th century. Around the time of the 1995 Quebec referendum on sovereignty, a self-named partition movement flourished advocating the separation of certain areas of Quebec, particularly the anglophone areas such as Montreal's West Island, in the event of Quebec separation, and such areas would remain part of Canada. The movement is no longer active.

==== Nunavik ====
Nunavik (red) within Quebec

Nunavik is Quebec's northernmost Inuit and First Nation territory, as well as northernmost territory overall, which seeks a status similar to Nunatsiavut in Labrador.

=== Ontario ===
==== Northern Ontario ====
Northern Ontario (red) within Ontario. The green area is an extended administrative area.

There have been various movements proposing that the region of Northern Ontario secede from Ontario to form its own province. The first such movement emerged in Sudbury in the 1890s, when the provincial government began taxing mines. A second movement emerged after the creation of Alberta and Saskatchewan in 1905. In the 1940s, an organization, called the New Province League, was formed to lobby for the creation of a new territory of "Aurora."

In 1966, a committee of mayors from the region, comprising Max Silverman of Sudbury, G. W. Maybury of Kapuskasing, Ernest Reid of Fort William, Leo Del Villano of Timmins, Merle Dickerson of North Bay, and Leo Foucault of Espanola, was formed to study the feasibility of Northern Ontario forming a new province. In 1999, the Northeastern Ontario Municipal Association, a committee consisting of the mayors of 14 Northern Ontario municipalities, wrote a letter to Prime Minister Jean Chrétien asking him to outline the necessary conditions for the region to secede from Ontario to form a new province. The movement emerged as a reaction to the government of Mike Harris, whose Common Sense Revolution was widely unpopular in the region even though Harris was representing the Northern Ontario riding of Nipissing in the Ontario Legislature.

The Northern Ontario Heritage Party advocated the creation of a separate province by dividing from Southern Ontario in the 1970s although the party did not attract widespread electoral support. A newer group, the Northern Ontario Secession Movement, began a similar campaign in 2006 but did not attract the same degree of attention. The Northern Ontario Heritage Party was re-registered in 2010 with a platform that did not advocate for full separation, but instead supported a number of measures to increase the region's power in the province. In 2016, the party began advocating for the full secession of Northern Ontario from the province, but it dropped separation from its platform again in 2018.

==== Northwestern Ontario ====
Northwestern Ontario (red) within Ontario

In 2006, some residents of Northwestern Ontario proposed that the region secede from Ontario to join Manitoba, due to the perception that the government of Ontario does not pay sufficient attention to the region's issues. One paper in Canadian Public Policy suggested the region merge with Manitoba to form a new province called "Mantario."

==== Toronto ====
Map of Greater Toronto

Toronto is the largest city in Canada. Some have argued that the rest of Ontario benefits from Toronto more than the reverse. Some activists have lobbied for a separate province of Toronto. Toronto Mayor Mel Lastman was in office when he floated the idea because of what he perceived as the province's excessive draining of tax resources from Toronto without providing sufficient support for public services within the city. In 2018, some activists revived the proposal again after Premier Doug Ford had introduced legislation to cut the number of seats on Toronto City Council from 47 to 25 seats months after the 2018 municipal election was already underway.

=== Western Canada ===
==== Buffalo ====
Buffalo was a proposed Canadian province prior to 1905. Carved out of the southern portion (south of 55°N) of the North-West Territories, it would have comprised the southern halves of the present-day provinces of Alberta and Saskatchewan, including the already-sizable urbanized communities of Edmonton, Calgary, Saskatoon, and Regina, with Regina as the capital. Its main proponent was Sir Frederick Haultain, the Premier of the North-West Territories, who said in 1904, "One big province would be able to do things no other province could." The proposal was not popular, especially in Calgary and Edmonton, both of which had their own ambitions to be a capital city (Edmonton eventually became the capital of Alberta). The proposal was rejected in 1905 by Prime Minister Wilfrid Laurier, who divided the region reaching 60°N with a north–south boundary as the provinces of Alberta and Saskatchewan.

==== Vancouver Island ====
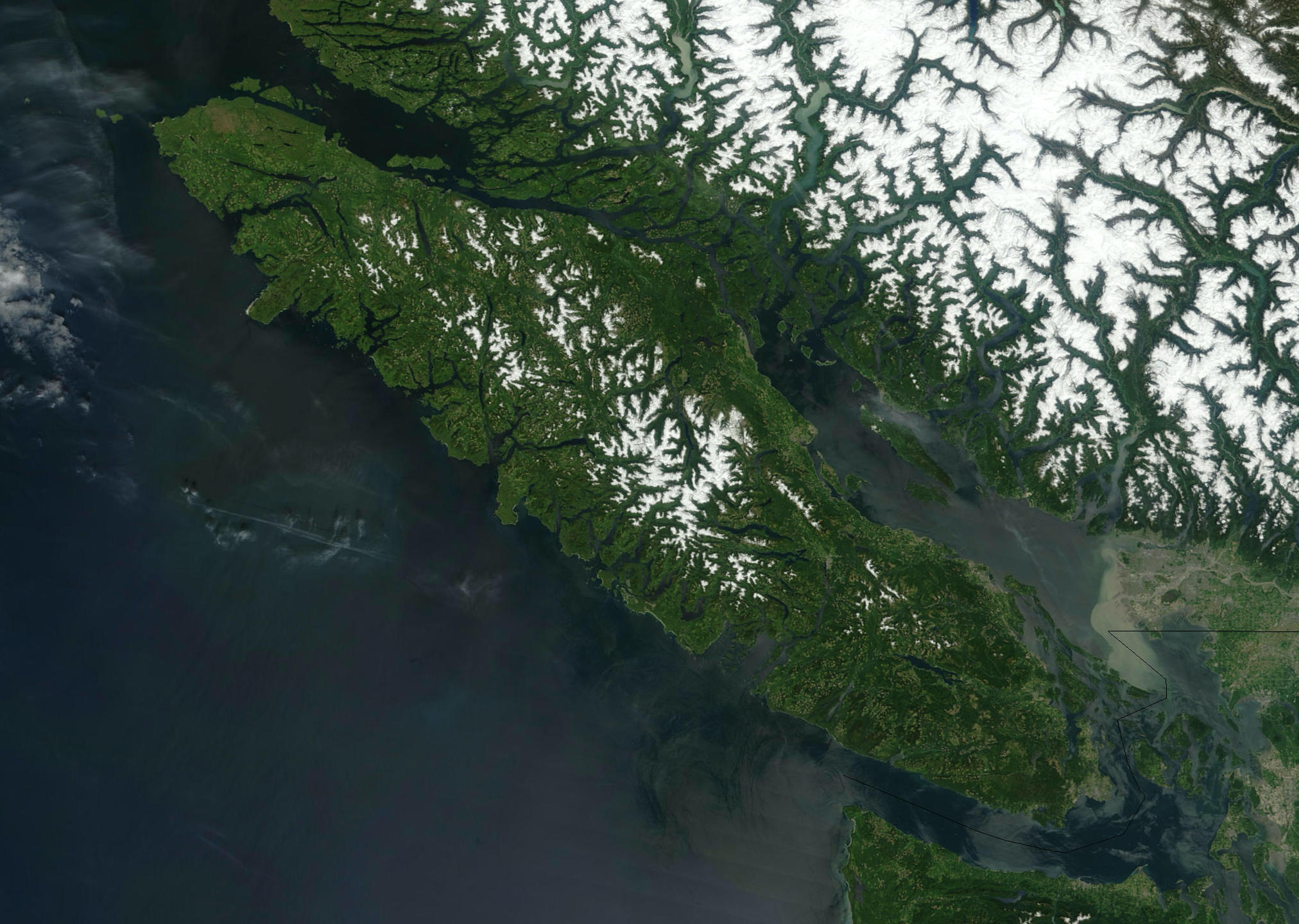
Vancouver Island, off the coast of mainland British Columbia

The Colony of Vancouver Island was established in 1849, but was joined to the mainland Colony of British Columbia in 1866; when the united colony joined Canada in 1871, Vancouver Island remained part of the province of British Columbia. In 2013, in response to the federal electoral district redistribution, two separatist groups emerged to make Vancouver Island its own country or province. They hoped to move the British Columbia Legislature to a different city, make Vancouver Island its own province, and fly the flag of Vancouver Island by 2021. In the 2017 provincial election, the Vancouver Island Party proposed a referendum for Vancouver Island residents to vote on the issue. Vancouver Island has more people than three provinces and all three territories.

=== Northern Canada ===
The three territories of Northern Canada (red)

Each of the three Canadian territories has movements lobbying for their territorial political status to be upgraded to full provincehood. Yukon Premier Tony Penikett fought the Meech Lake Accord in the 1980s on the grounds that provisions of the accord would have made it virtually impossible for the territory ever to become a province. In late 2004, Prime Minister Paul Martin surprised some observers by expressing his personal support for all three territories "eventually" gaining provincial status. He cited their importance to the country as a whole and the ongoing need to assert sovereignty in the Arctic, particularly since global warming could make that region more open to exploitation and lead to more complex international waters disputes.

=== National Capital Region ===
The National Capital Region of Canada (striped)

At various times, provincial, territorial or special federal status has been proposed for the metropolitan area consisting of Ottawa, Ontario and Gatineau, Quebec so that the National Capital Region would be a district like the Australian Capital Territory, District of Columbia (United States), or the National Capital Territory of Delhi (India).

== Movements outside Canada ==
There have been movements to create new provinces and territories outside the borders of Canada.

=== Movements inside British overseas territories ===
In 1905, Ian Malcolm suggested in the British House of Commons that the United Kingdom might benefit from transferring one or more isles of the West Indies to Canada for national defence.

In 1919, Canadian Prime Minister Robert Borden and his delegation to the Paris Peace Conference discussed transferring parts of the West Indies as territories, sub-dominions, or League of Nations mandates, including the possibility of exchanging some to the United States for the Alaska Panhandle.

==== Current British overseas territories ====
===== Bermuda =====
In 1949 Henry Vassey, then Chairman of the Bermuda Trade Development Board, urged the House of Assembly of Bermuda to pursue a political union with Canada. Four Methodist church congregations in Bermuda are part of the United Church of Canada, forming Bermuda Presbytery of the United Church's Maritime Conference headquartered in Sackville, New Brunswick. The same Salvation Army Church territory serves both Canada and Bermuda with many of their pastors travelling between countries.

In January 2009, Nova Scotia Premier Rodney MacDonald and Bermuda Premier of Bermuda Ewart Brown signed a five-year agreement that would strengthen Nova Scotia's ties with Bermuda and enhance service export opportunities, tourism, transportation, and health links in both jurisdictions.

Bermuda's ties to Canada include the Institute of Chartered Accountants of Bermuda being overseen by Canada's Chartered Professional Accounting profession.

===== Turks and Caicos Islands =====
The Turks and Caicos Islands are a British overseas territory in the West Indies. There is some support for a union with Canada, but the islands' small economy and Canada's involvement in Haiti made that controversial. In 1917, Robert Borden first suggested for Canada to annex the islands. In 1974, Canadian New Democratic Party MP Max Saltsman introduced a failed attempt at consolidating the islands.

The idea was brought up again in 1986 by Progressive Conservative MP Dan McKenzie, but it was rejected by his party's caucus committee on external affairs in 1987. The committee, chaired by David Daubney, looked at immigration, banking, health care, and tourism issues in making its decision.

In 2004, Conservative MP Peter Goldring visited Turks and Caicos to explore the possibility once more. He drafted a motion asking the Canadian government to look into the issue, but his party declined and cited immigration, tourism, and economic issues. However, the Canadian government did not dismiss the possibility of a future union. That year, the province of Nova Scotia voted to invite Turks and Caicos to join the province if the islands ever became part of Canada. That would bypass the problems with admitting Turks and Caicos as a separate province.

On 2 March 2009, the Ottawa Citizen ran an article on its online site reporting the interest of the Canadian government to open a deep-water port in the Caribbean that would open up "a new market for Canadian goods... in the Caribbean and nearby Central and South America." "Suppose the port, unaffordable for Caribbean countries, boosted their standard of living and bolstered hemispheric security. Suppose the port doubled as a Canadian military operations base for countries wanting help to patrol their waters and to interdict the Caribbean's robust trade in smuggled arms, drugs and people."

In May 2014, Turks and Caicos Premier Rufus Ewing visited the Canadian Parliament looking to improve its relationship with Canada, and was open to a possible "marriage" in the future.

In the Turks and Caicos Islands, support for a "special relationship" with Canada was at 90% in the 1990s, and in 2003, support for the relationship stood at around 60%. Goldring has championed the cause of integrating the Turks and Caicos Islands as a Canadian territory for security benefits as well as increasing Canada's influence in Central and Southern America with regard to counterterrorism and trade and combating encroaching Chinese influence in several small Caribbean islands, such as St. Lucia.

==== Former British overseas territories ====
Former British territories have expressed interest in joining Canada.

===== The Bahamas =====
In 1911, at the request of the Bahamian House of Assembly, the Canadian and the Bahamian governments began serious negotiations for Bahamian accession to the Canadian Confederation. However, a racial panic ignited by the migration of over 1000 African-Americans fleeing violence in Oklahoma derailed the discussions. Canadian Prime Minister Wilfrid Laurier turned against the idea and cited incompatible "ethnical origin." After Laurier lost the September 1911 federal election, Bahamian Governor William Grey-Wilson travelled to Canada to reopen accession talks with the newly elected Prime Minister Robert Borden. In a meeting between Grey and Borden on 18 October 1911, Borden rejected the possibility of taking the Bahamas into the Canadian Confederation. His reasoning was that the events of the past year had proved that Canadian public opinion would not countenance the admission of a majority-black province. The British Colonial Office concurred: "No doubt for the moment the Dominion government would safeguard their interests, but there are signs of the rise of a colour question in Canada and in any case it cannot be long before U.S. opinion gives the tone to Canada in regard the Negro."

===== Barbados =====
In 1884, the Barbados Agricultural Society sent a letter to Sir Francis Hincks requesting his private and public views on whether the Dominion of Canada would favourably entertain having the then colony of Barbados admitted as a member of the Canadian Confederation. Asked of Canada were the terms of the Canadian side to initiate discussions and whether the island of Barbados could depend on the full influence of Canada in getting the change agreed to by Britain.

In 1952, the Barbados Advocate newspaper covered the idea and even polled several prominent Barbadian politicians, lawyers, businessmen, the Speaker of the Barbados House of Assembly, and later, as first President of the Senate, Sir Theodore Brancker; however, they were moreso in favor of the immediate federation of Barbados along with the rest of the British Caribbean (a proposal that would later materialize as the West Indian Federation) with complete dominion status within five years.

In 2008, the former President of the Barbados International Business Association (BIBA) reflected on the close historical relations between both nations and questioned whether a political union was possible within the next 100 years.

===== Jamaica =====
In the political crisis that hit Jamaica in 1882, one of the proposed solutions was joining Canada. Michael Solomon led the pro-Confederation faction, but when he introduced a motion to that effect in the Legislative Council, everyone but he voted against it.

===== The West Indies Federation =====
In a 1952 letter by T. G. Major, a Canadian Trade Commissioner in Trinidad and Tobago, it was stated to the Under Secretary of State for External Affairs that the respective leaders of the British Caribbean could not reach a clear consensus for the exact style of a federal union. During a parliamentary conference held in Ottawa, it was also noted though that the colony of British Honduras (now Belize, which held observer status in the West Indies Federation) showed more interest in a union with Canada than with the other British Caribbean colonies.

=== Movements inside the United States ===
==== Maine ====
Some propose for Maine to secede from the United States and join Canada as a province. Maine was briefly held by British forces and part of British North America during the War of 1812. It was returned to the United States by the Treaty of Ghent.

==== Minnesota ====
In the late 2010s, the petitions and discussions have launched what people are calling "Minnexit". Although no political party has floated the notion of secession, there is a long-standing history of reconnecting at least part of Minnesota with Canada through Manitoba's southeast attachment, the Northwest Angle.

Starting in December 2025, the Trump administration's use of ICE in Minnesota during Operation Metro Surge led some Minnesota residents to reexamine their relationship with the US and consider whether Minnesota would be better off as a province. One local resident created bumper stickers with the phrase "Minnetoba," following up on his previous letter to the editor of a local newspaper suggesting Minnesota join Confederation.

In January 2026, in response to the increasing use of violence by ICE and the deaths of three civilians (Renée Good, Alex Pretti, and a third who died in ICE custody), former Minnesota Governor Jesse Ventura stated that he thought that Minnesota should join Canada. Ventura stated that he was not joking, insisting "I'm serious about this," and that "It's obvious Trump don't want us. It's obvious that he's ready to fracture the whole country for his own folly." In his remarks, Ventura referenced the Trump administration's increasingly brash imperialist rhetoric with regards to Canada and other countries, such as Greenland, saying "Instead of Canada becoming the 51st state of America and lose their health care ... I'd like to see all of us become Canadians." This comes in the wake of remarks by Donald Trump about annexing Canada, insisting he would use "economic force" to annex Canada and make it the "51st state."

===== Northwest Angle =====
The Northwest Angle is a part of Lake of the Woods County, Minnesota that is accessible by road to the rest of the United States only through Manitoba (excluding winter ice roads). Due to laws restricting fishing rights in the Lake of the Woods, some residents suggested leaving the United States and joining Canada in 1997. The following year, Representative Collin Peterson proposed a constitutional amendment that would allow the residents of the Northwest Angle, which is part of his district, to vote on seceding from the United States and joining Canada. Peterson's proposal angered the leaders of Red Lake Indian Reservation, which holds most of the Northwest Angle's land. Whether this change would also include Elm Point, a small cape to the south of the angle but also cut off from the United States, is not determined.

==== Vermont ====
Some supporters of the Vermont independence movement propose for Vermont to join Canada as a province.

==== Washington ====
===== Point Roberts =====
Point Roberts is a peninsula, attached by land to the city of Delta, British Columbia, but surrounded entirely by water otherwise; residents of Point Roberts must travel through Canada, or by water or air, to reach any other part of Washington state. In 1949, there was talk about Point Roberts seceding from the U.S. and joining Canada, but this never happened. The idea has been periodically revived, most recently in 2020 after the community was heavily impacted by the closure of the Canada-U.S. border during the COVID-19 pandemic, but has still not been actively pursued.

=== Movements inside European outer regions ===
==== Saint Pierre and Miquelon ====
In the past, a few politicians in Saint Pierre and Miquelon have proposed that the islands pursue secession from France to become part of Canada either as part of Quebec or as a new territory so that the islands, whose economy is highly dependent on the Atlantic fishery, could participate in Canada's much larger maritime fishing zone, rather than France's limited "keyhole" zone. In April 2021, during the COVID-19 pandemic, the president of St. Pierre and Miquelon's territorial council, Bernard Briand, proposed that the islands join the "Atlantic Bubble".

=== Movements inside Europe ===
==== Iceland ====
During the 2008–2011 Icelandic financial crisis, a small group of Icelanders launched "Invite Iceland In," a campaign to get Iceland admitted to Confederation as Canada's 11th province. The campaign did not attract widespread political support and is now dormant. A smaller-scale proposal for Iceland to adopt the Canadian dollar as its new official currency to replace the Icelandic króna received much more attention, including attracting comment from Icelandic Prime Minister Jóhanna Sigurðardóttir, but it also failed to get adopted.

==== Scotland ====
There were renewed calls for a second independence referendum from pro-independence parties such as the Scottish National Party after the U.K. voted to leave the EU in the 2016 Brexit referendum despite Scotland voting to remain in the European Union. The author Ken McGoogan stated that Scotland should join Canada as its eleventh province and argued that Scotland would be treated better under Canadian rule. However, there is little support for that from either the Scottish public or Scotland's main political parties.

== See also ==
- 51st state
- Alberta separatism
- Former colonies and territories in Canada
- Inuit Nunangat
- Quebec sovereignty movement
- Territorial evolution of Canada – after 1867
- Western alienation in Canada
- Potential Canadian EU membership
- Cascadian independence movement
- List of proposed state mergers
