= Special cities of Korea =

Special cities of Korea may refer to:

- Special cities of North Korea
- Special cities of South Korea
