= RMS Queen Mary =

Former British ocean liner

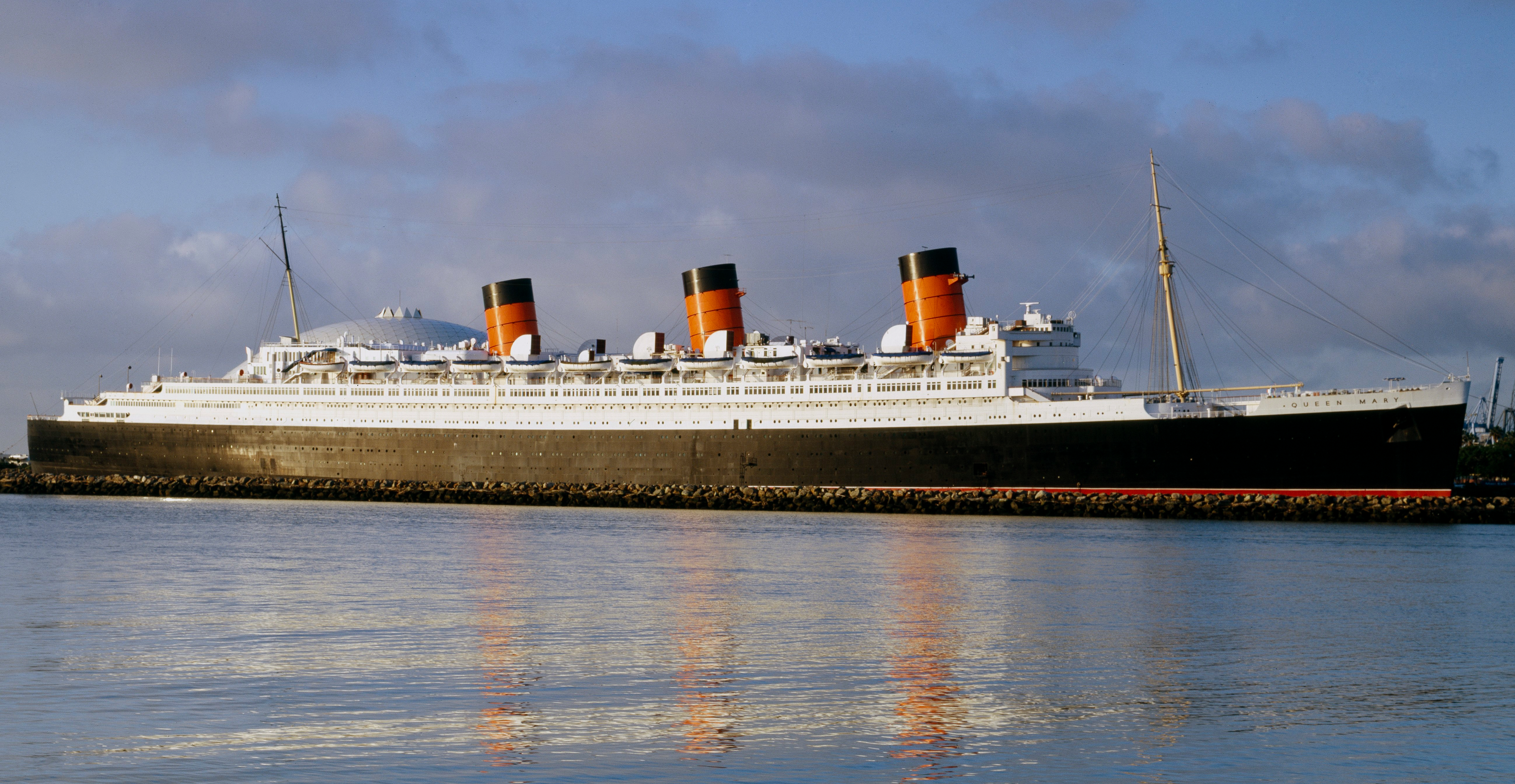
- Queen Mary at Long Beach, California

History

- Name: Queen Mary
- Namesake: Mary, Queen of the United Kingdom
- Owner: 1936–49: Cunard-White Star Line; 1949–67: Cunard Line; 1967–present: City of Long Beach
- Port of registry: Liverpool
- Route: Southampton to New York via Cherbourg
- Ordered: 3 April 1929
- Builder: John Brown & Company; Clydebank, Scotland
- Yard number: 534
- Laid down: 1 December 1930
- Launched: 26 September 1934
- Sponsored by: Queen Mary
- Christened: 26 September 1934
- Maiden voyage: 27 May 1936
- In service: 1936–1967
- Out of service: 9 December 1967
- Identification: IMO number: 5287938; Radio Callsign: GBTT
- Status: Converted into a floating hotel and museum, Long Beach.

General characteristics
- Type: Ocean liner
- Tonnage: 80,774 GRT, 34,118 NRT (1936); 81,237 GRT, 33,073 NRT (1947)
- Displacement: 77,400 long tons (78,642 metric tons)
- Length: 1,019.4 ft (310.7 m) LOA; 1,004 ft (306.0 m) LWL; 965 ft (294.1 m) LBP
- Beam: 118 ft (36.0 m)
- Height: 181 ft (55.2 m)
- Draught: 38 ft 9 in (11.8 m)
- Decks: 12
- Installed power: 24 × Yarrow boilers
- Propulsion: 4 × Parsons single-reduction geared steam turbines; 4 shafts, 200,000 shp (150,000 kW)
- Speed: 28.5 kn (52.8 km/h; 32.8 mph) (service)
- Capacity: 2,140 passengers: 776 first (cabin) class, 785 cabin (tourist) class, 579 tourist (third) class
- Crew: 1,100
- RMS Queen Mary
- U.S. National Register of Historic Places
- Location within California
- Coordinates: 33°45′11″N 118°11′23″W
- NRHP reference No.: 92001714
- Added to NRHP: 15 April 1993

RMS Queen Mary is a former British ocean liner that operated primarily on the North Atlantic Ocean from 1936 to 1967 for the Cunard Line. It is currently a hotel, museum, and convention space in Long Beach, California, United States. It is on the US National Register of Historic Places and member of Historic Hotels of America, the official program of the National Trust for Historic Preservation. Built by John Brown & Company in Clydebank, Scotland, she was subsequently joined by RMS Queen Elizabeth in Cunard's two-ship weekly express service between Southampton, Cherbourg and New York. These "Queens" were the British response to the express superliners built by German, Italian, and French companies in the late 1920s and early 1930s.

Queen Mary sailed on her maiden voyage on 27 May 1936 and won the Blue Riband that August; she lost the title to SS Normandie in 1937 and recaptured it in 1938, holding it until 1952, when the new SS United States claimed it. With the outbreak of World War II, she was converted into a troopship and ferried Allied soldiers during the conflict. On one voyage in 1943, she carried over 16,600 people, setting a record for the most people carried on one vessel at the same time that still stands.

Following the war, Queen Mary returned to passenger service and, along with Queen Elizabeth, commenced the two-ship transatlantic passenger service for which the two ships were initially built. The pair dominated the transatlantic passenger transportation market until the dawn of the jet age in the late 1950s. By the mid-1960s, Queen Mary was ageing and operating at a loss.

After several years of decreased profits, Cunard officially retired the Queen Mary from service in 1967. Bought by the City of Long Beach to function as a restaurant, museum, and hotel, she left Southampton for the last time on 31 October 1967 and sailed to the Port of Long Beach where she was permanently moored. After undergoing extensive refurbishment and modifications, Queen Mary opened to the public in 1971 and has remained operational since.

== Construction and naming ==
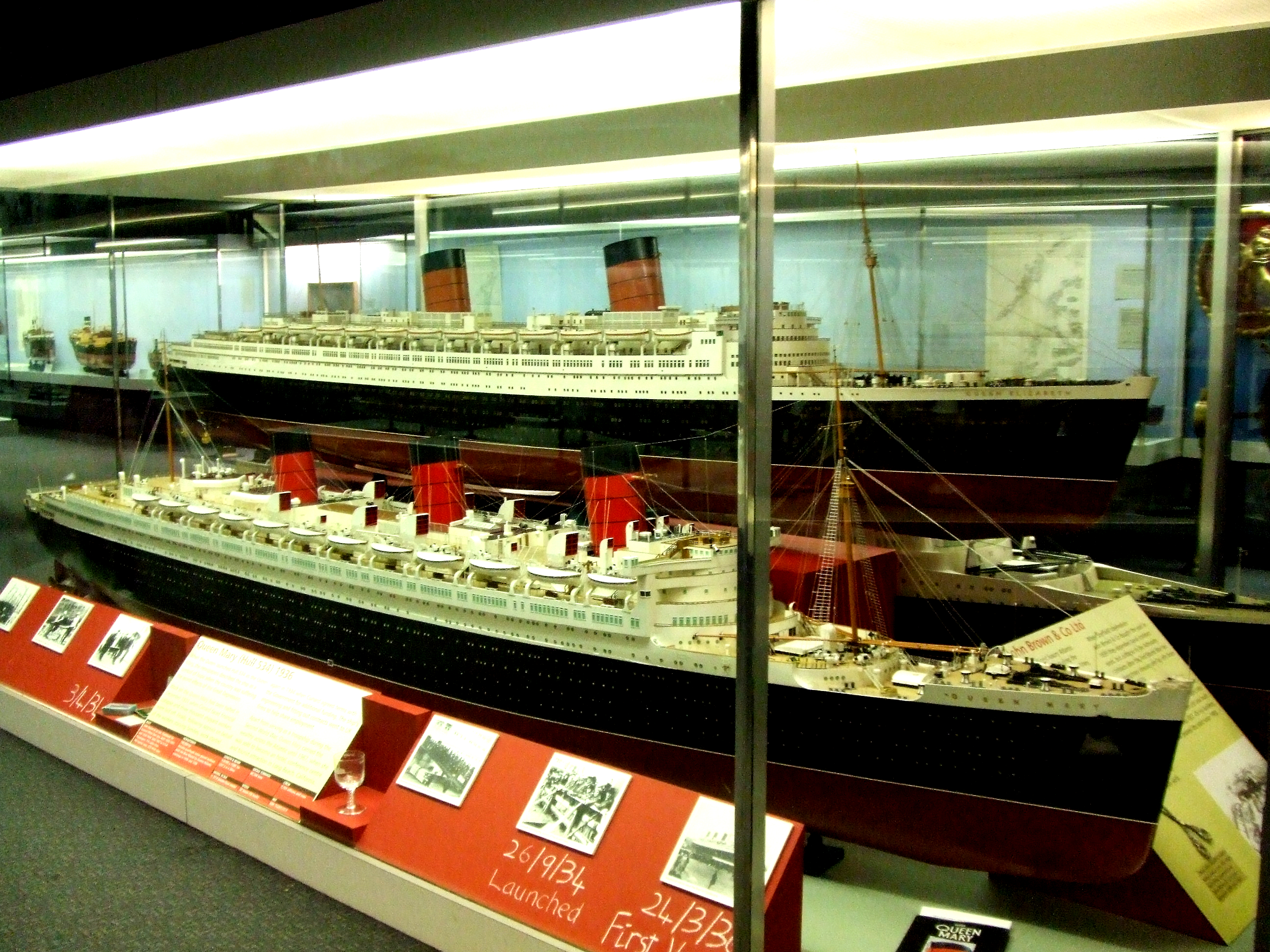
Scale models of Queen Mary (foreground) and Queen Elizabeth (background) created by John Brown & Company, on display at the Glasgow Museum of Transport.

With Weimar Germany launching Bremen and Europa into service, the United Kingdom and its shipping companies did not want to be left behind in the shipbuilding race. White Star Line, Cunard's chief British rival, began construction on the 80,000-ton Oceanic in 1928, while Cunard planned a 75,000-ton unnamed ship. Cunard's chief naval architect, George Mcleod Paterson, was the principal designer.

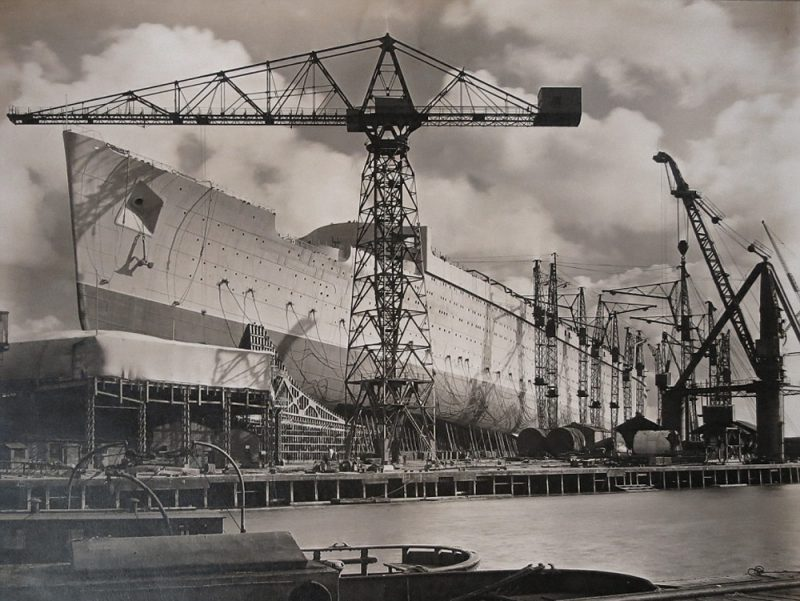
Queen Mary under construction at Clydebank, c. 1934

Construction on the ship, then known only as "Hull Number 534", began in December 1930 on the River Clyde by the John Brown & Company shipyard at Clydebank in Scotland. John Brown assisted in the design and construction of the vessel, which was his first major project in the shipyard. Work halted in December 1931 due to the Great Depression and Cunard applied to the British Government for a loan to complete 534. The Government granted the loan, providing enough money to complete the unfinished ship, and also to build a running mate to provide a two ship weekly service to New York.

One condition of the loan was that Cunard merge its operations with the White Star Line, which was also struggling due to the depression and had cancelled construction of its Oceanic. Both lines agreed to the merger, and, on 10 May 1934, the companies created a third company, Cunard-White Star Line, to manage their newly combined fleet. Work on 534 resumed immediately with a launch scheduled for 1934. Prior to the ship's launch, the River Clyde had to be specifically deepened and widened to cope with her size, undertaken by the engineer D. Alan Stevenson.

On 26 September 1934, Her Majesty Queen Mary launched Hull 534 as RMS Queen Mary. Eighteen drag chains slowed the ship down the slipway, which checked the liner's progress into the River Clyde. Until her launch, the name was a closely guarded secret. Cunard intended to name the ship Victoria, in keeping with company tradition of giving its ships names ending in "ia", but when company representatives asked King George V's permission to name the ocean liner after Britain's "greatest queen", he said his wife, Mary, would be delighted. Accordingly, the delegation had no other choice but to report that 534 would be called Queen Mary. (Note: Cunard officials have always denied the story; and, traditionally, the names of royal family members have only been used for capital ships of the Royal Navy. This anecdote has also been widely contested ever since Frank Braynard published it in his 1947 book: Lives of the Liners. Some support for the story was provided by Washington Post editor Felix Morley, who sailed as a guest of the Cunard Line on Queen Mary's 1936 maiden voyage. In his 1979 autobiography, For the Record, Morley wrote that he was placed at a table with Sir Percy Bates, Chairman of the Cunard Line. Bates told him the story of the naming of the ship "on condition you won't print it during my lifetime." The story was finally confirmed in 1988 when Braynard attended the same dinner party as Eleanor Sparkes, daughter of Sir Ashley Sparkes, who'd been with Bates during the conversation with George V. She confirmed the "favourite ship story" to him, telling the exact anecdote that Braynard had published in his book.) The name had already been given to the Clyde turbine steamer TS Queen Mary, so Cunard made an arrangement with its owners and this older ship was renamed Queen Mary II.

Following her launch, workers began fitting out the Queen Mary. She received 24 Yarrow boilers in four boiler rooms and four Parsons turbines in two engine rooms. The boilers delivered 400 pounds per square inch (28 bar) steam at 700 °F (371 °C), which provided a maximum of 212,000 shp (158,000 kW) to four propellers, each turning at 200 RPM.

Workers completed most of Queen Mary's work by March 1936 and she left Clydebank for her sea trials. During those trials, she achieved a speed of 32.84 knots. She then prepared for her maiden voyage. The 1,019.4 ft (310.7 m) LOA Queen Mary measured 80,774 gross register tons (GRT), potentially capturing the title of the world's largest passenger ship. Her rival Normandie, was 1,029 ft (313.6 m) LOA, but only measured 79,280 GRT. However, before Queen Mary entered service, Normandie resumed service after her winter overhaul. During that overhaul, CGT modified Normandie to increase her size to 83,243 GRT, retaining the title of world's largest passenger ship. Completion of Queen Mary ultimately took 3 1/2 years and cost 3.5 million pounds sterling, then equal to $17.5 million (equivalent to $330 million in 2025).

== Pre-World War II ==
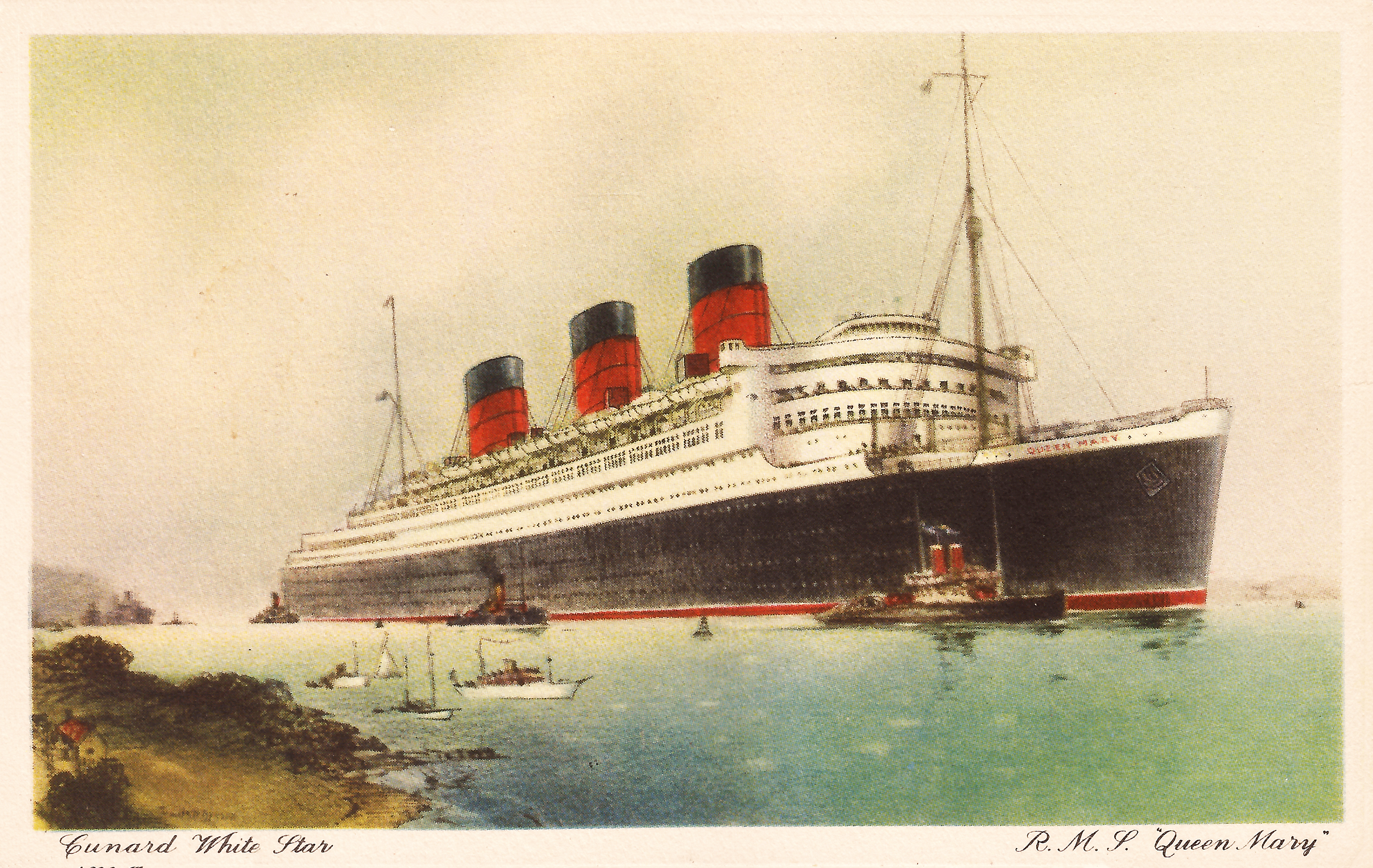

Commanded by Sir Edgar Britten, Queen Mary sailed on her maiden voyage from Southampton on 27 May 1936. She sailed at high speed for most of her maiden voyage to New York until heavy fog forced a reduction of speed on the final day of the crossing, arriving in New York Harbor on 1 June 1936.

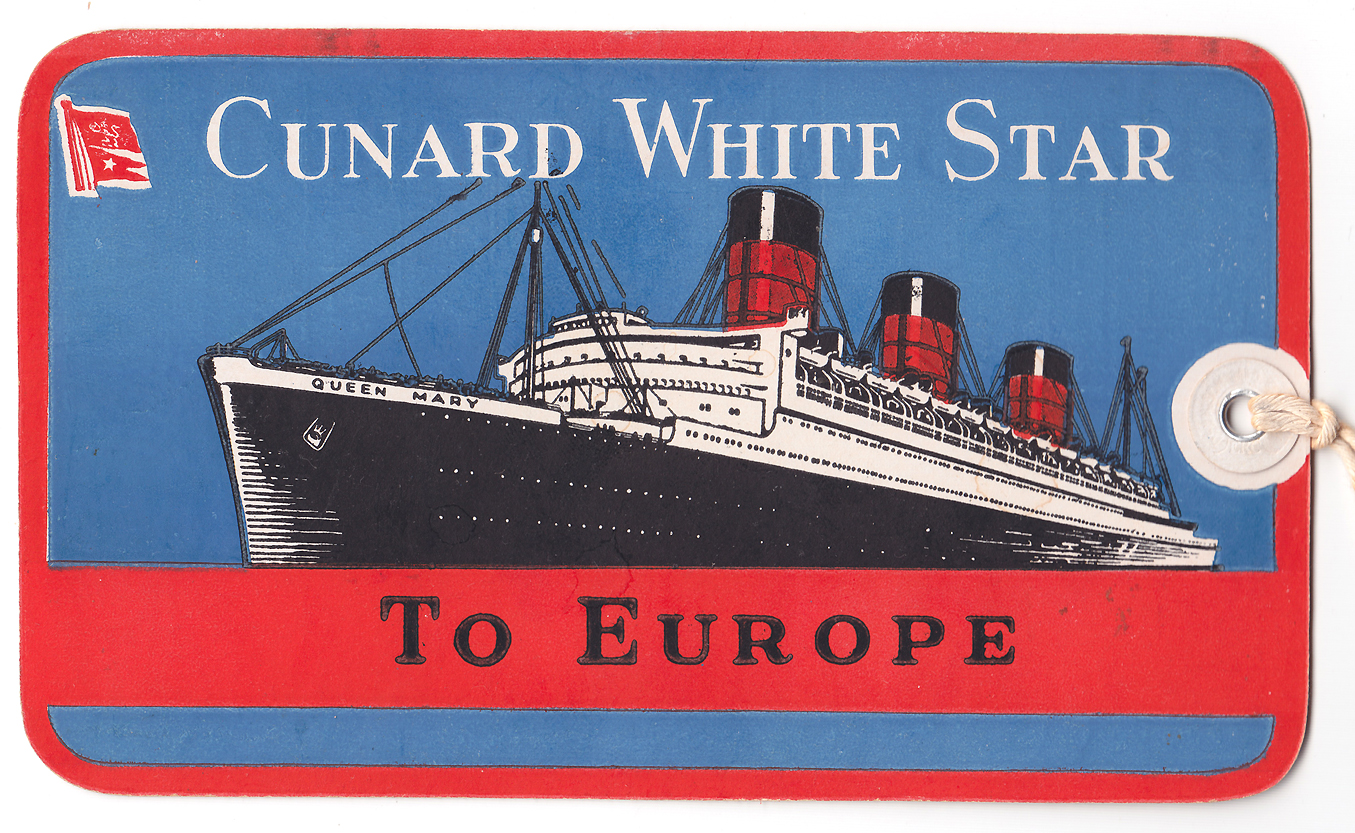
A Queen Mary baggage tag

Queen Mary's design received criticism for being too traditional, especially when Normandie's hull was revolutionary with a clipper-shaped, streamlined bow. Except for her cruiser stern, she seemed to be an enlarged version of her Cunard predecessors from the pre-First World War era. Her interior design, while mostly Art Deco, seemed restrained and conservative when compared to the ultramodern French liner. Nonetheless Queen Mary proved to be the more popular vessel than her rival, in terms of passengers carried.

"It's Men That Count", a late 1930s promotional poster for the Cunard Line

In August 1936, Queen Mary captured the Blue Riband from Normandie, with average speeds of 30.14 knots (55.82 km/h; 34.68 mph) westbound and 30.63 knots (56.73 km/h; 35.25 mph) eastbound. In 1937, Normandie received a new set of propellers and reclaimed the Blue Riband. However, in 1938, under the command of Robert B. Irving, Queen Mary took back the Blue Riband in both directions, with average speeds of 30.99 knots (57.39 km/h; 35.66 mph) westbound and 31.69 knots (58.69 km/h; 36.47 mph) eastbound, records which stood until lost to United States in 1952.

In 1938, a smaller fleetmate based on Queen Mary, Mauretania (1938), entered service. She will later provide some inspiration for the Queen Elizabeth, which was due to enter service in 1940.

=== Interior ===
Arthur Joseph Davis of Messrs, Mewes and Davis, and Benjamin Wistar Morris designed the Queen Mary's interior spaces. The Bromsgrove Guild constructed much of the ship's interior, while H.H. Martyn & Co. built the staircases, foyers, and entrances. Among the facilities available on board Queen Mary, the liner featured two indoor swimming pools, beauty salons, libraries and children's nurseries for all three classes, a music studio, a lecture hall, telephone connectivity to anywhere in the world, outdoor paddle tennis courts, and dog kennels. The largest room on board was the cabin class main dining room (grand salon), spanning three stories in height and anchored by wide columns. The ship had many air-conditioned public rooms on board. The cabin-class swimming pool facility spanned over two decks in height. This was the first ocean liner to be equipped with her own Jewish prayer room – part of a policy to show that British shipping lines avoided the antisemitism evident in Nazi Germany.

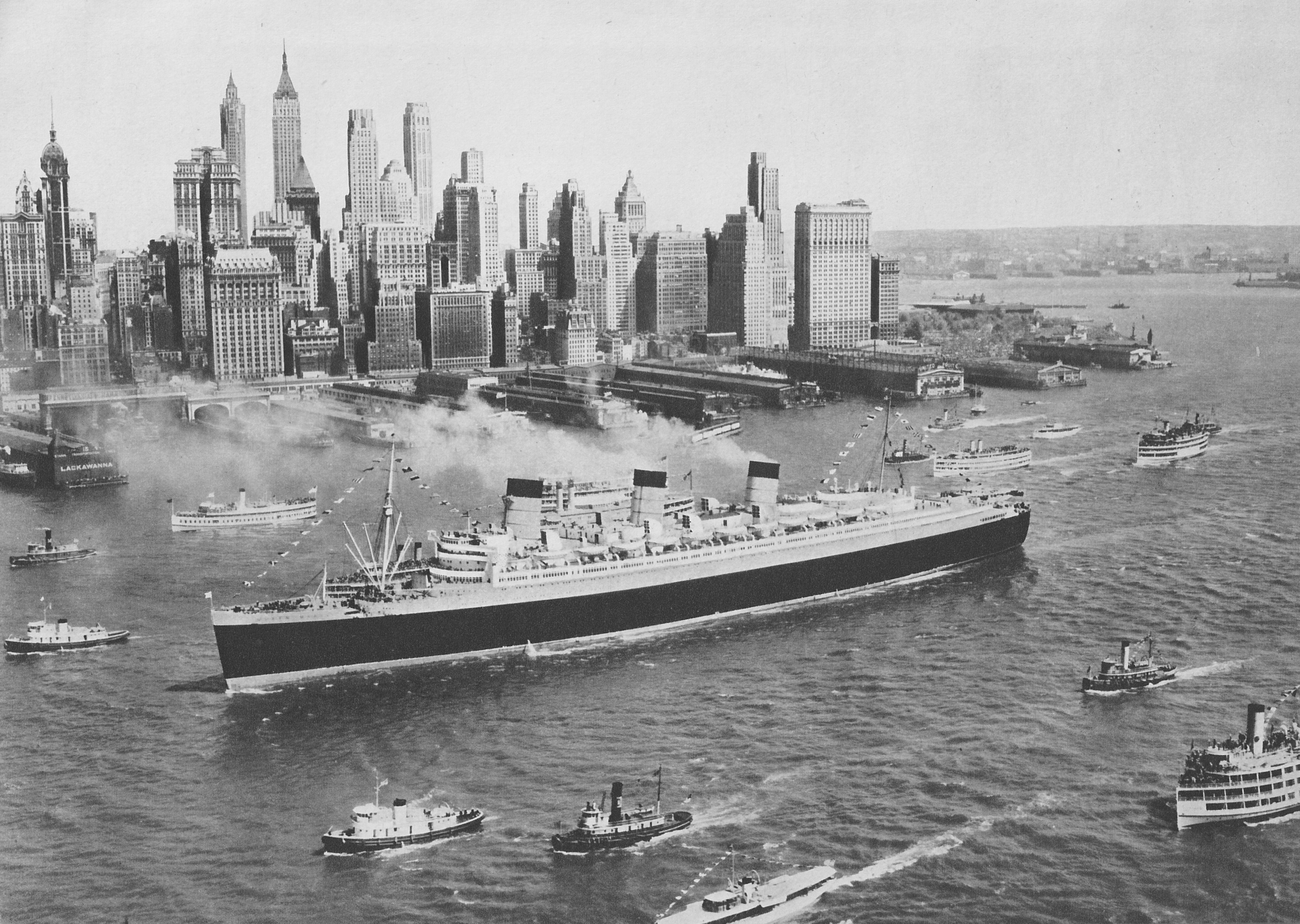
Pre-war view of the Queen Mary entering New York

The cabin class main dining room featured a large map of the transatlantic crossing, with twin tracks symbolising the winter/spring route (further south to avoid icebergs) and the summer/autumn route. During each crossing, a small motorised model of Queen Mary would travel along the mural to indicate the vessel's progress en route. As an alternative to the main dining room, Queen Mary featured a separate cabin class Verandah Grill on the Sun Deck at the upper aft of the ship. The Verandah Grill was an exclusive à la carte restaurant with a capacity of approximately eighty passengers and converted to the Starlight Club at night. It was designed and painted by Doris Zinkeisen and Cecil Beaton described it as "By far the prettiest room on any ship". Also on board was the Observation Bar, an Art Deco-styled lounge with wide ocean views.

Woods from different regions of the British Empire were used in her public rooms and staterooms. Accommodation ranged from fully equipped, luxurious cabin (first) class staterooms to modest and cramped third-class cabins. Artists commissioned by Cunard in 1933 for works of art in the interior include Edward Wadsworth and A. Duncan Carse, as well as Algernon Newton RA, whose painting Evening on the Avon hung opposite Bertram Nicholls' Sussex in the Long Gallery. There are also murals and paintings by Kenneth Shoesmith.

Queen Mary First Class Art Deco Interiors
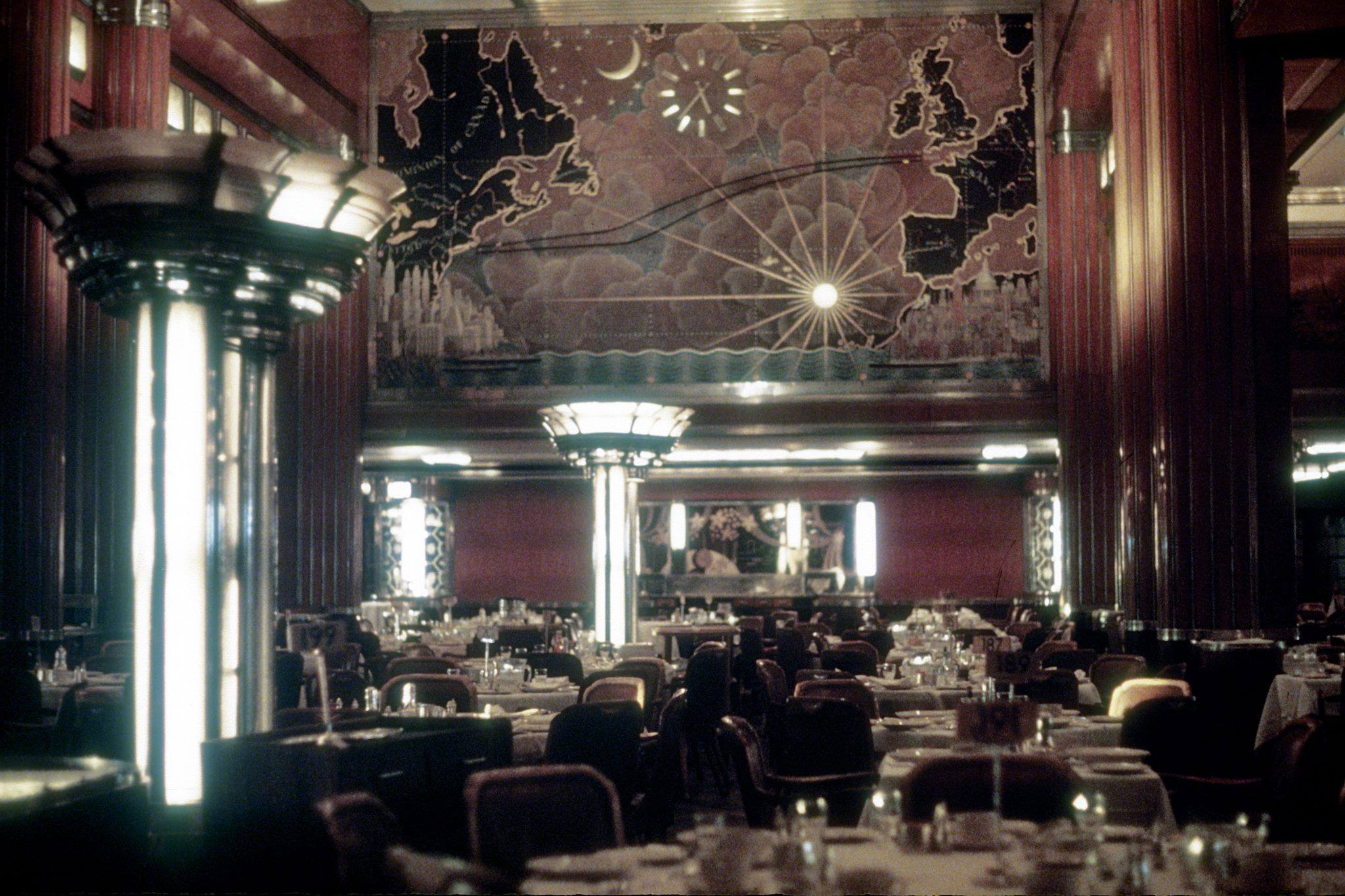
First class dining room, now known as the "Grand Salon". Note the mural above, which had a moving crystal model that tracked the route progress of the Queen Mary and later, when in service, RMS Queen Elizabeth.

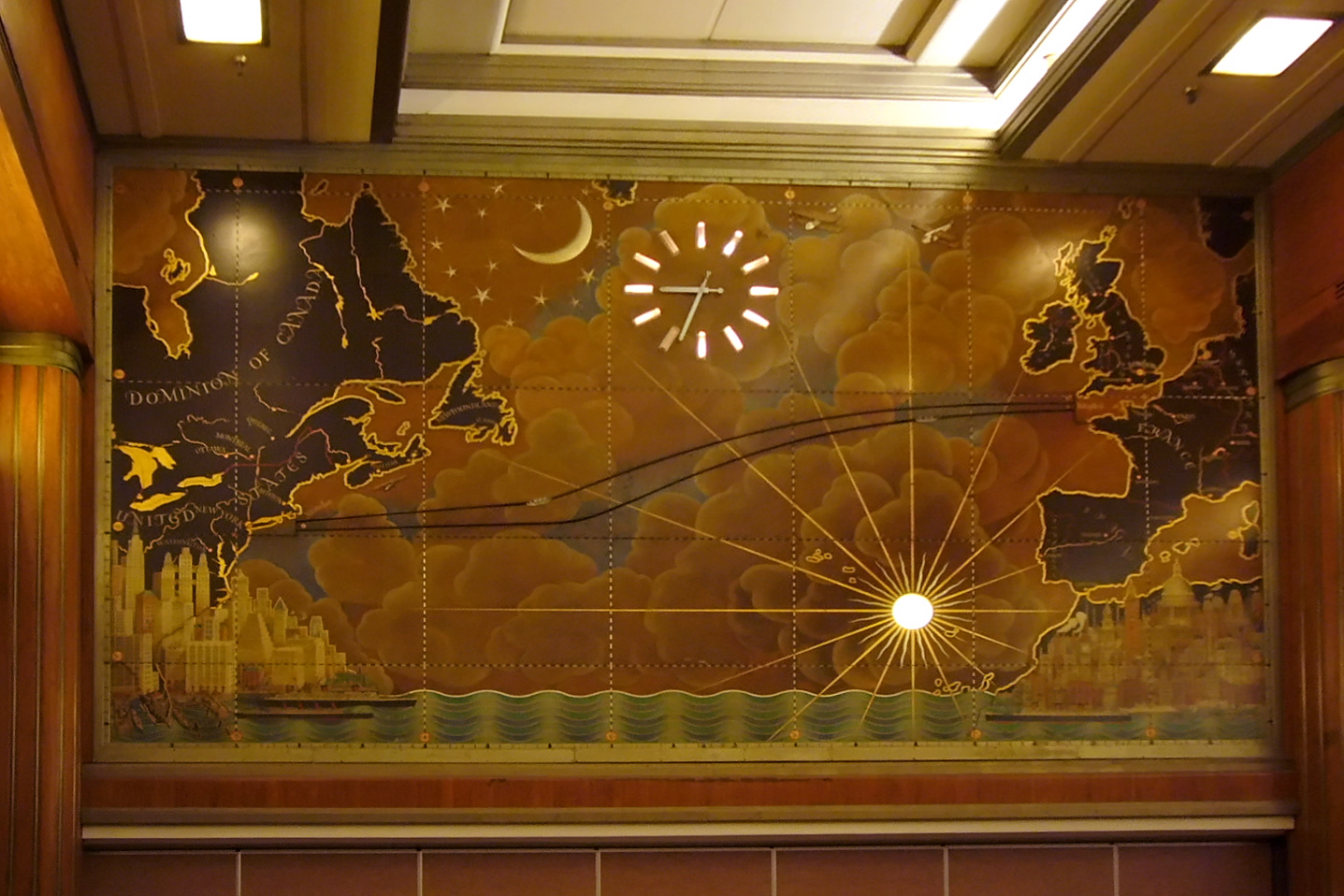
Mural in the main dining room, or "Grand Salon" on which a crystal model tracked the ship's progress

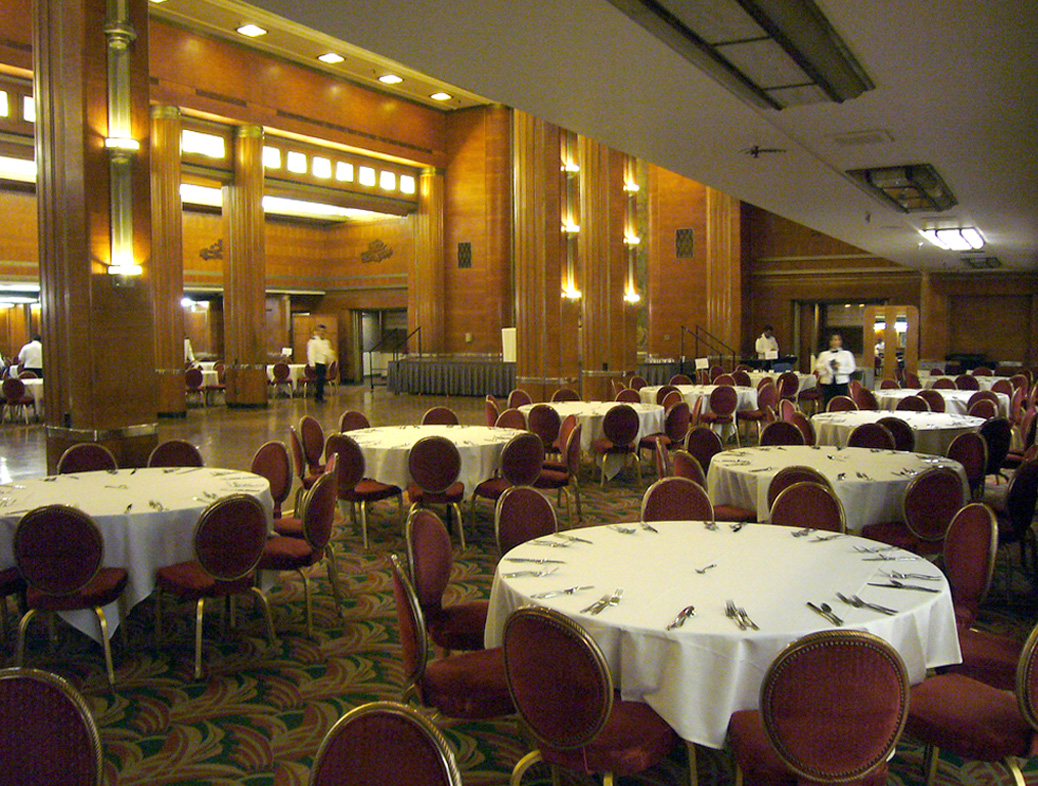
First class dining room, now known as the "Grand Salon"

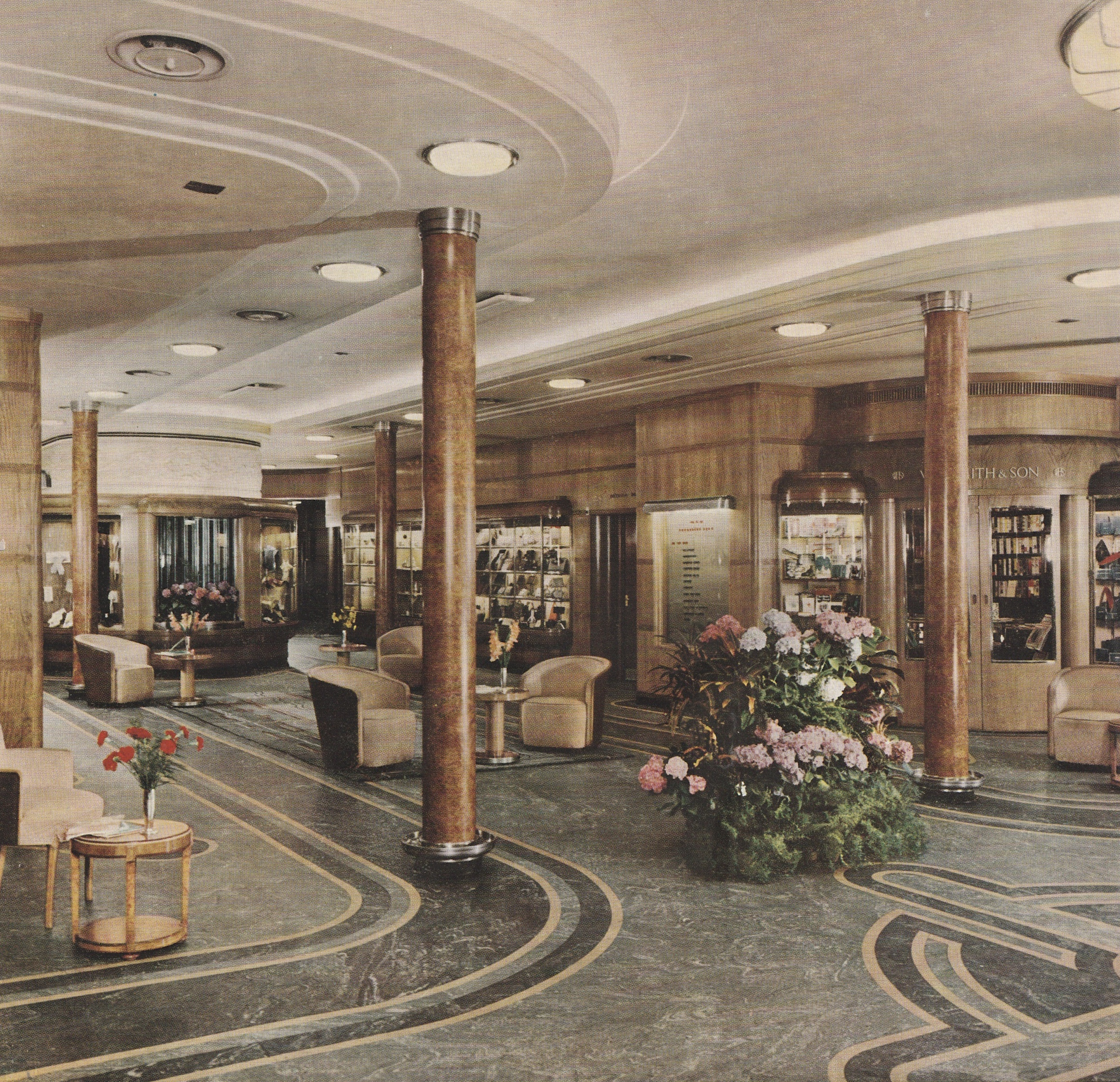
First Class Shopping Centre photographed during the 1930's.

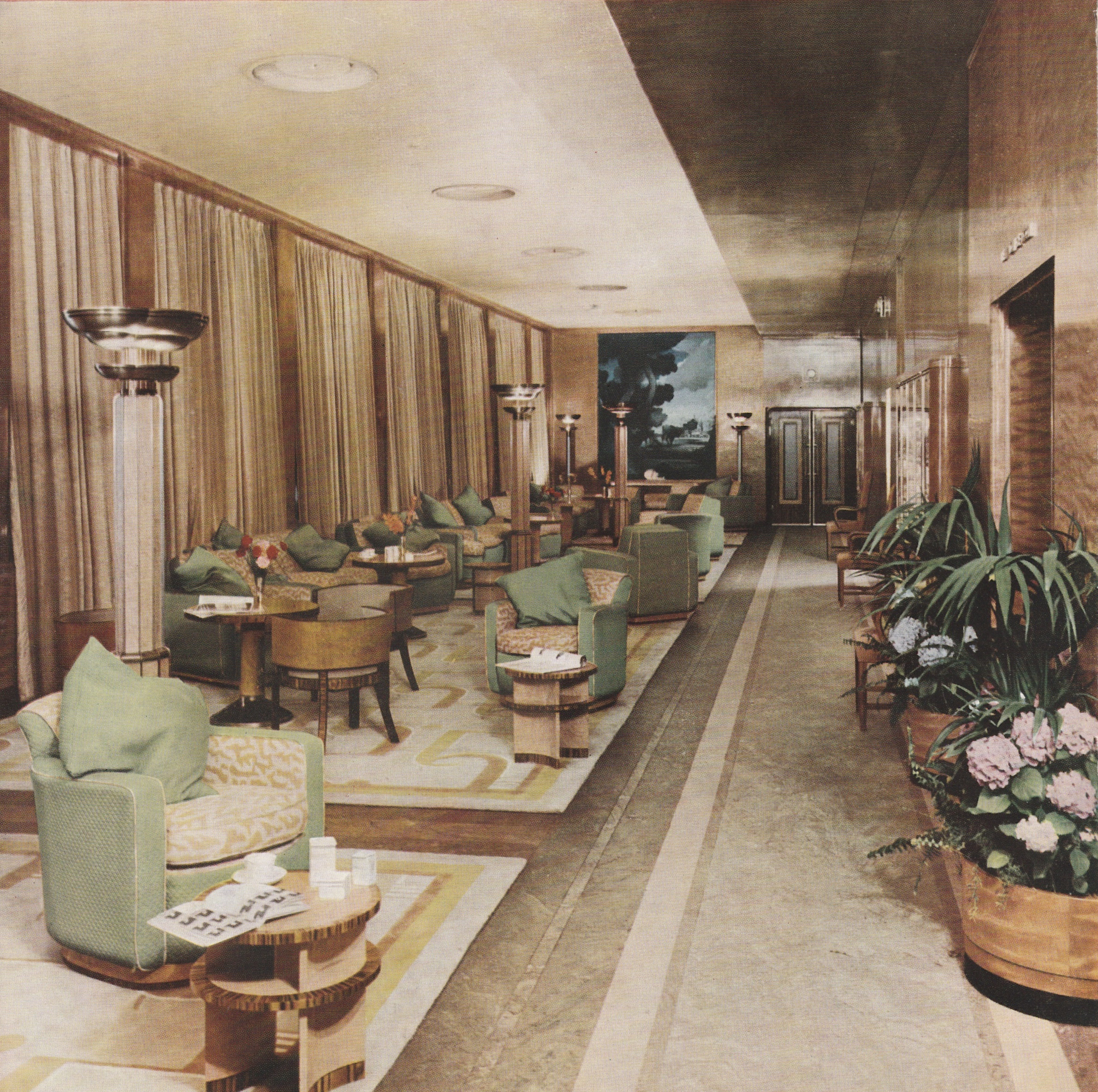
The Long Gallery photographed during the 1930's.

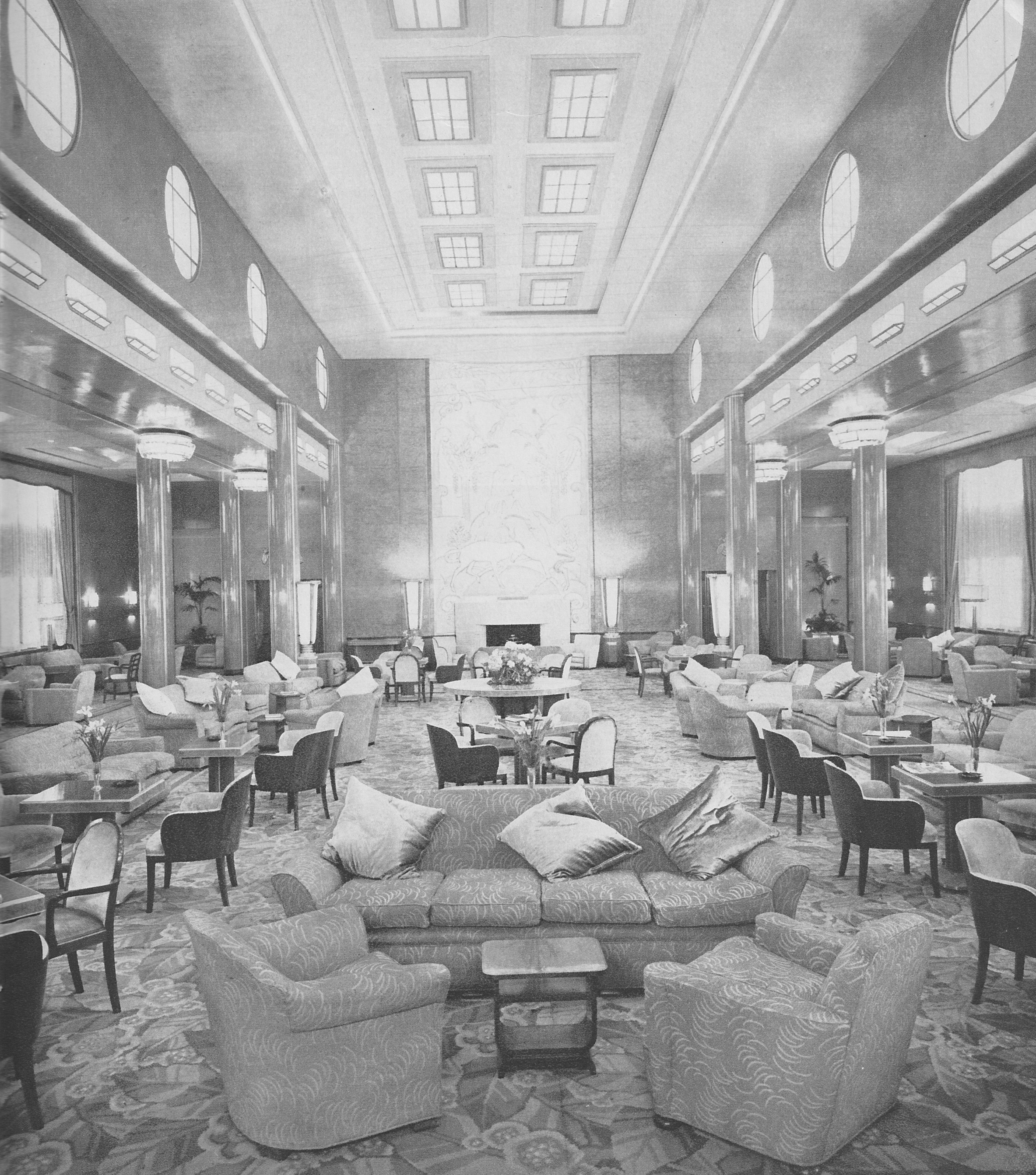
First Class Main Lounge photographed during the 1930's.

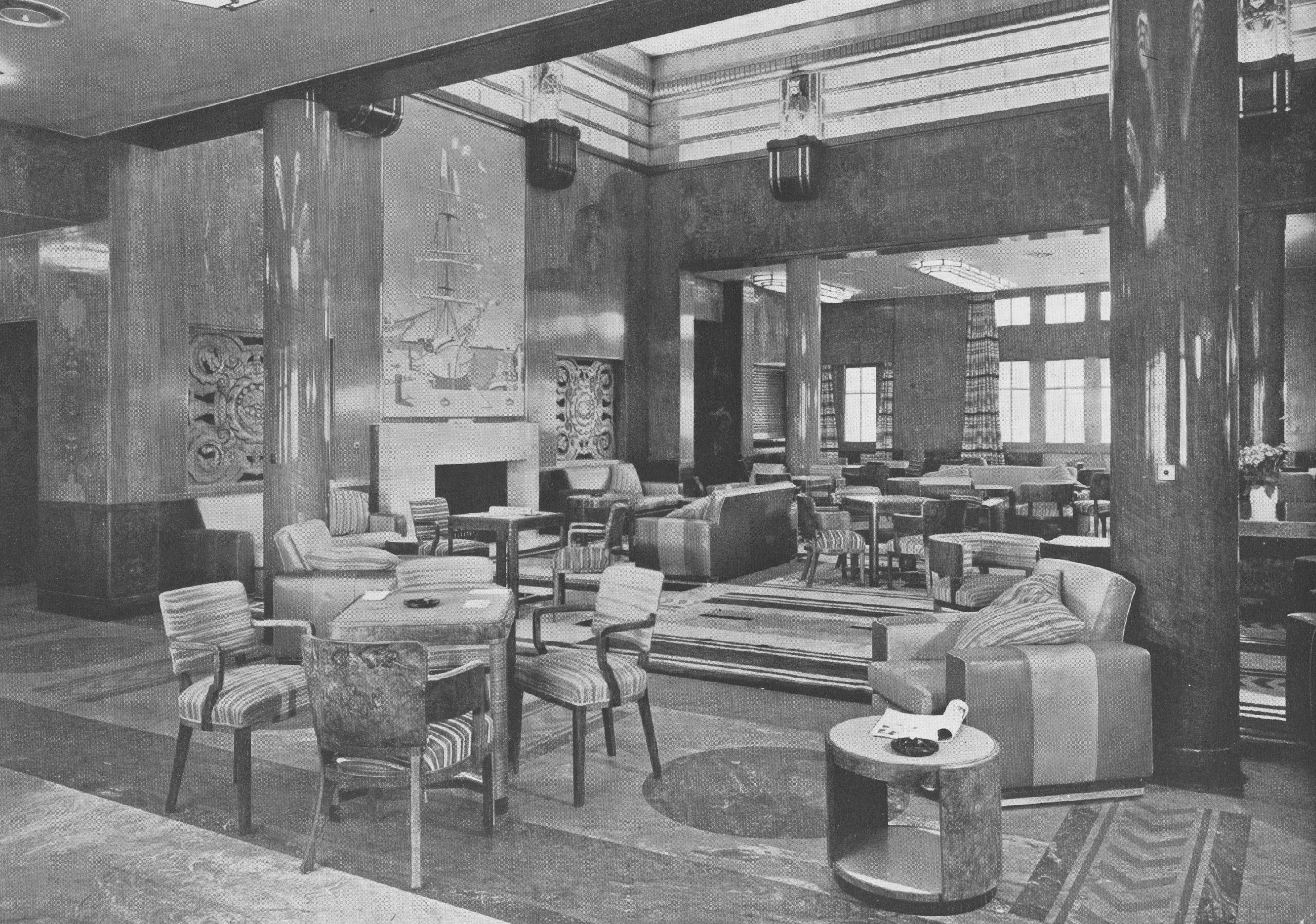
First Class Smoking Room photographed during the 1930's.

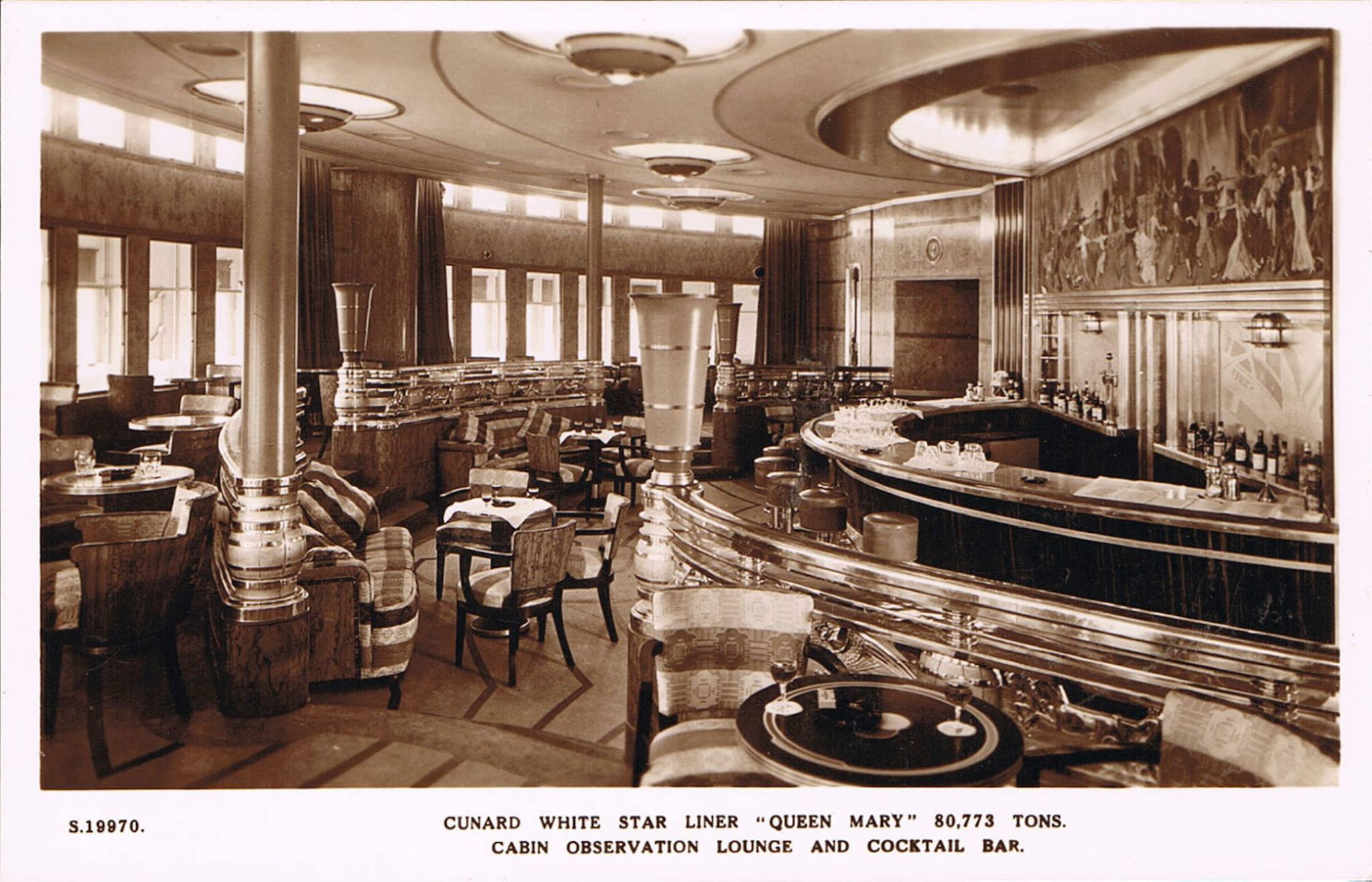
Observation Bar. Note the lower band of windows that look into the enclosed Promenade Deck. They were removed in 1967 after the lounge was extended.

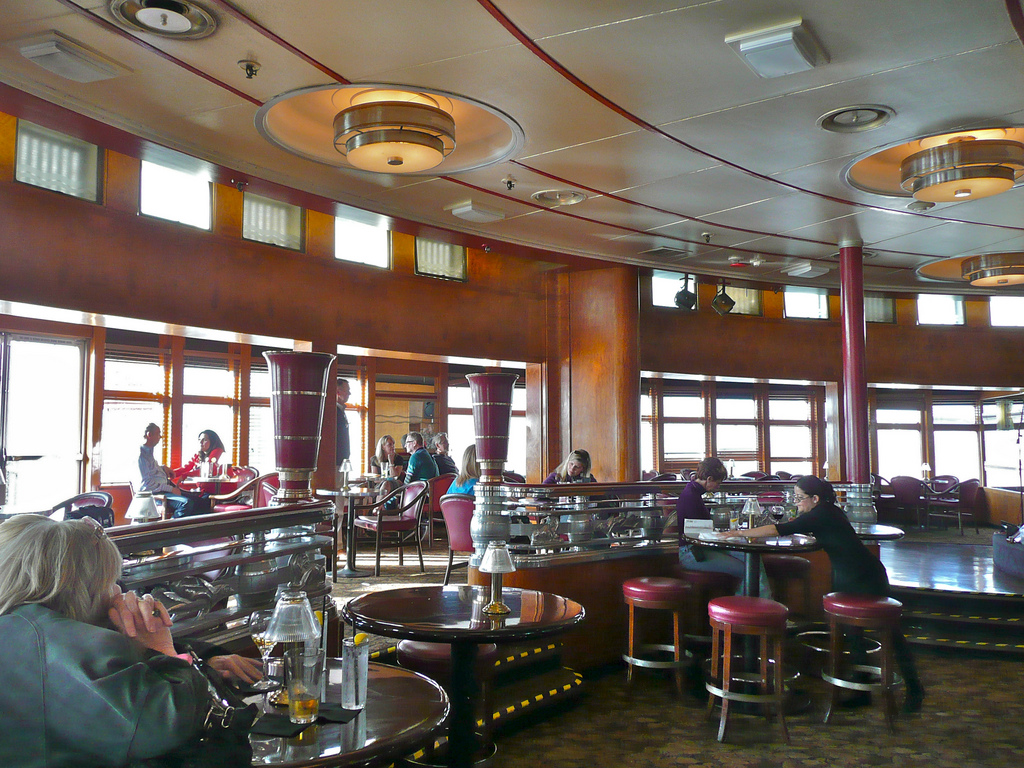
Observation Bar lounge. The windows were once part of the enclosed Promenade Deck turnaround; the lounge was extended forward after 1967.

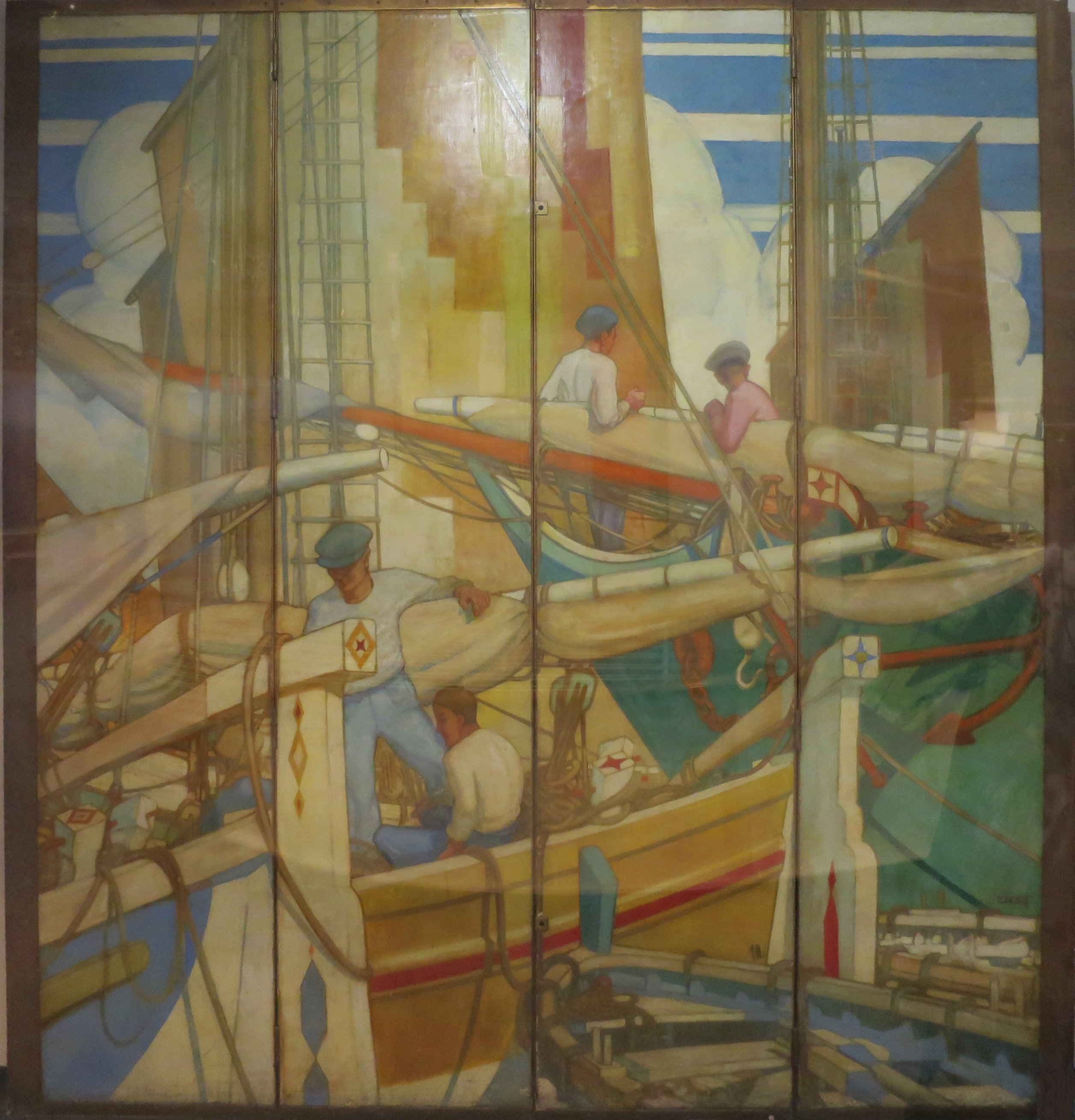
"Mediterranean Harbour Scene", folding screen in 1st class drawing room by Kenneth Shoesmith

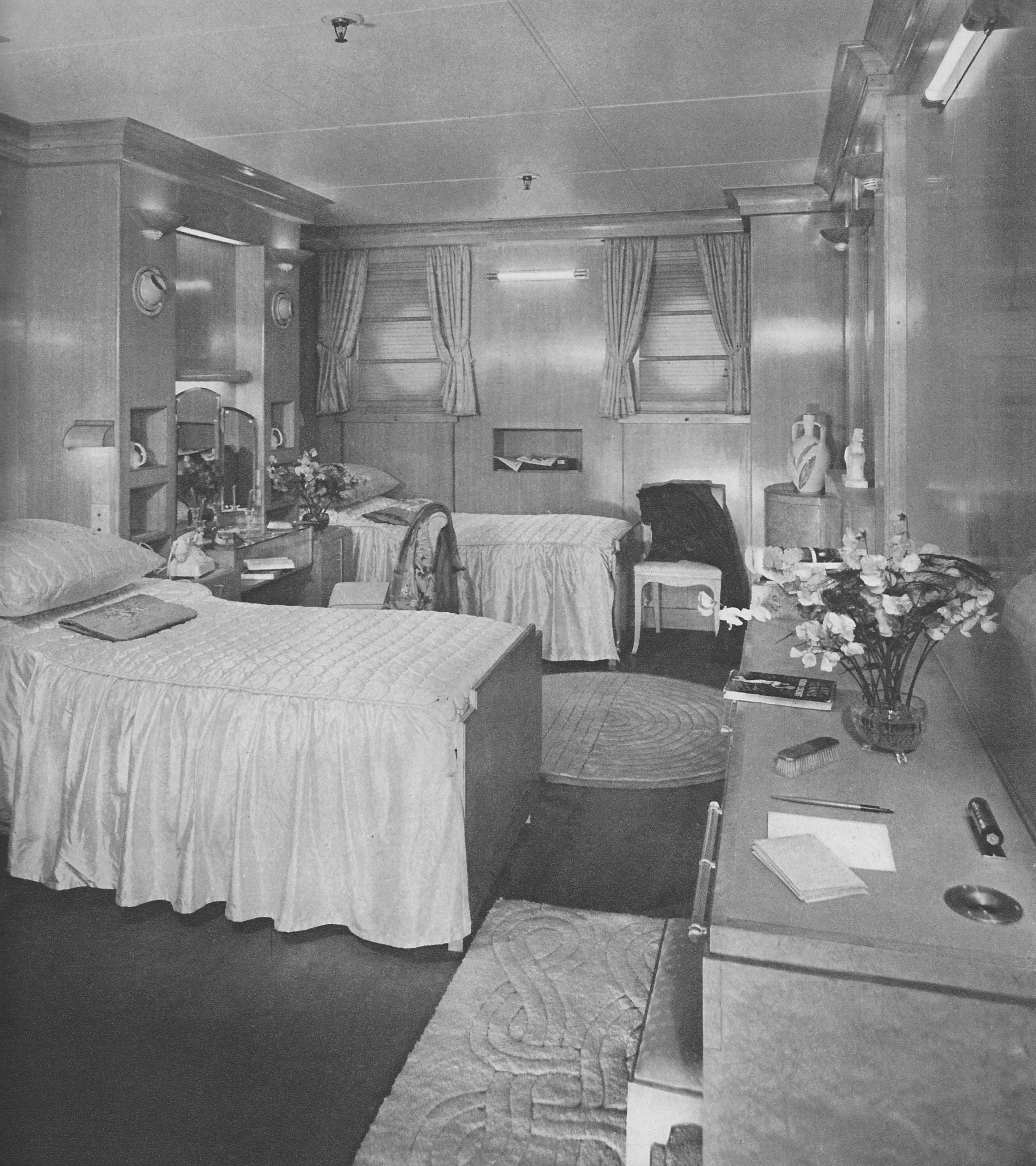
First Class bedroom photographed during the 1930's.

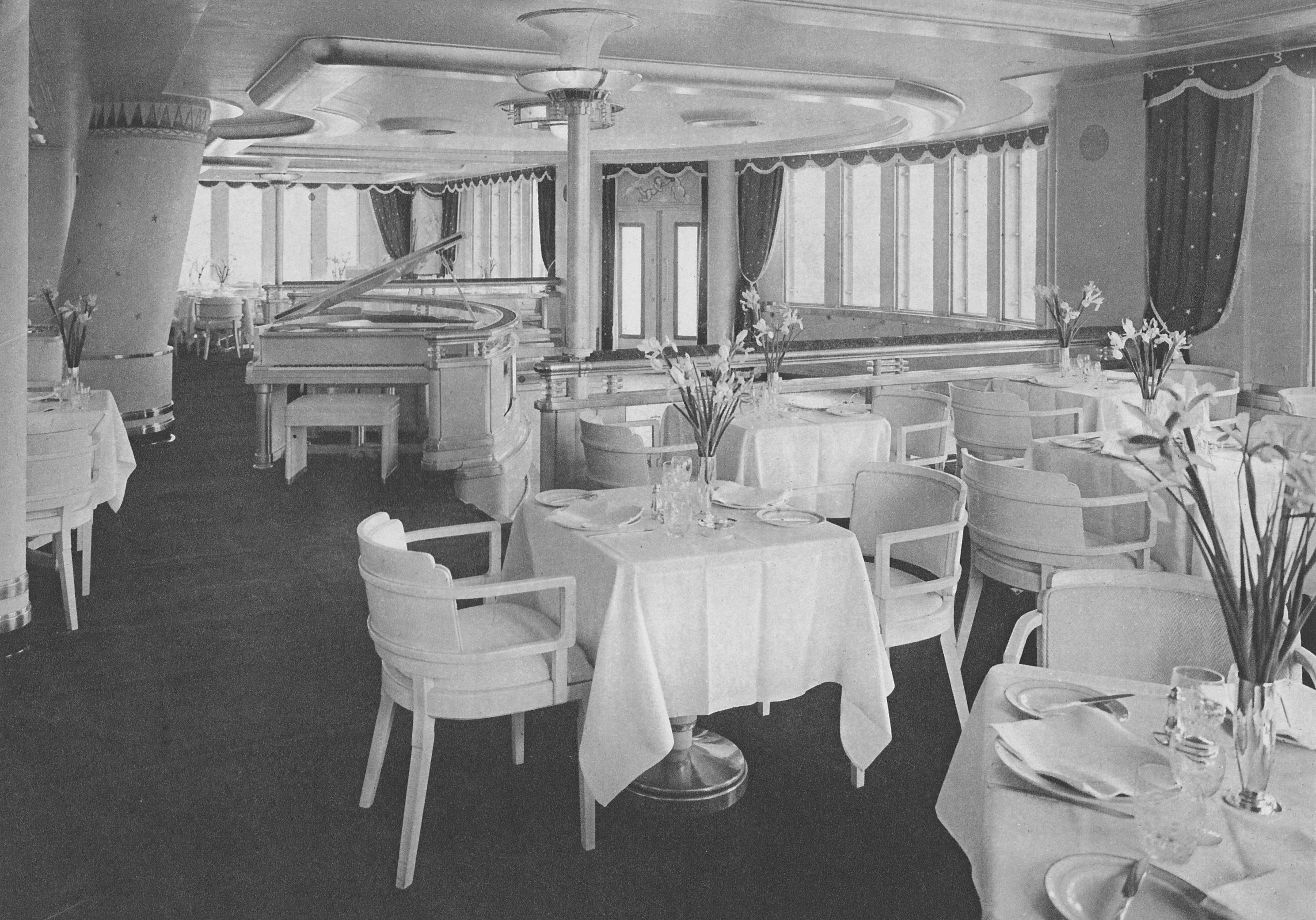
The Verandah Grill photographed during the 1930's.
Cabin Class Interiors
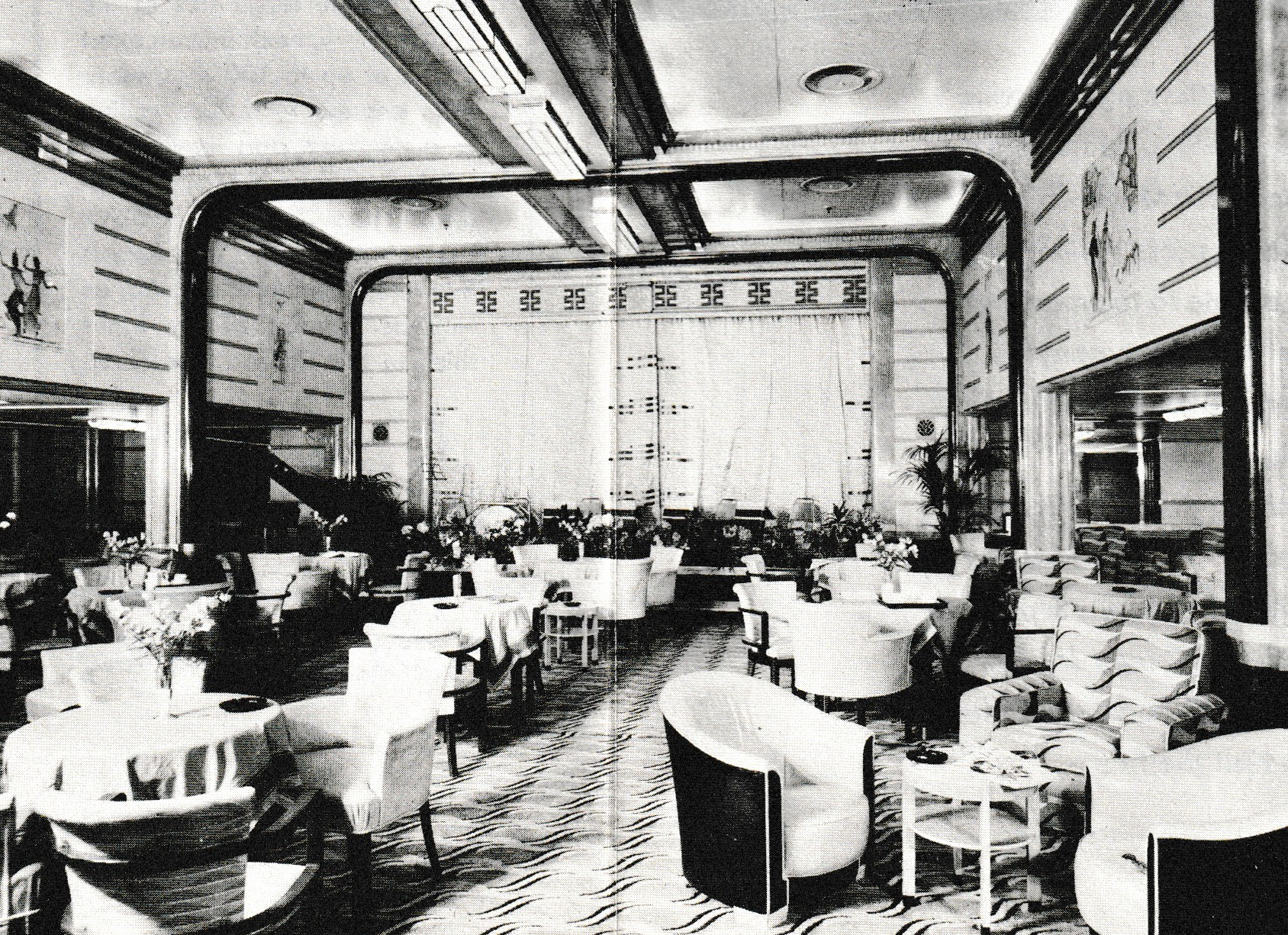
Cabin Class Dining Saloon photographed during the 1930's.

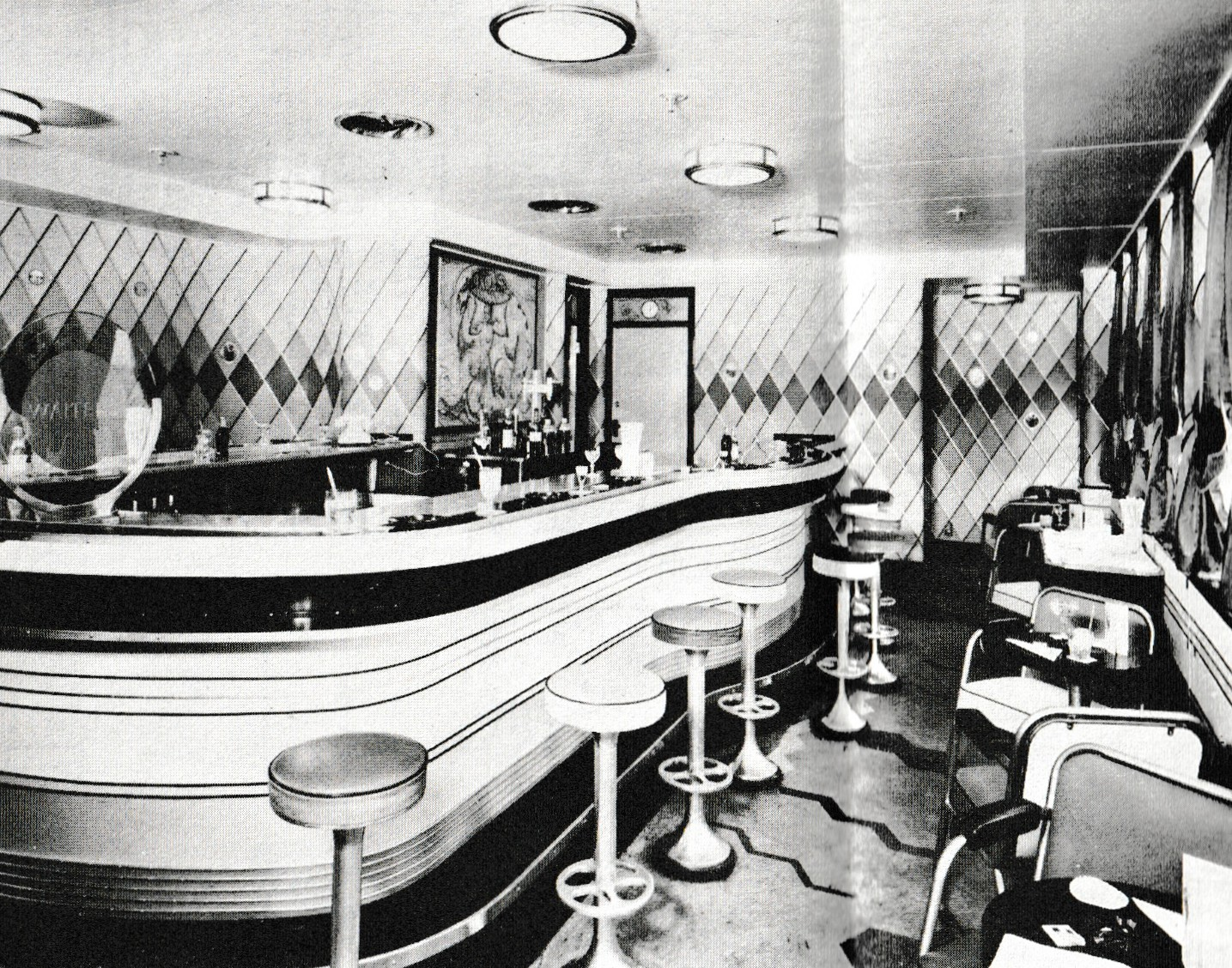
Cabin Class Cocktail Bar photographed during the 1930's.

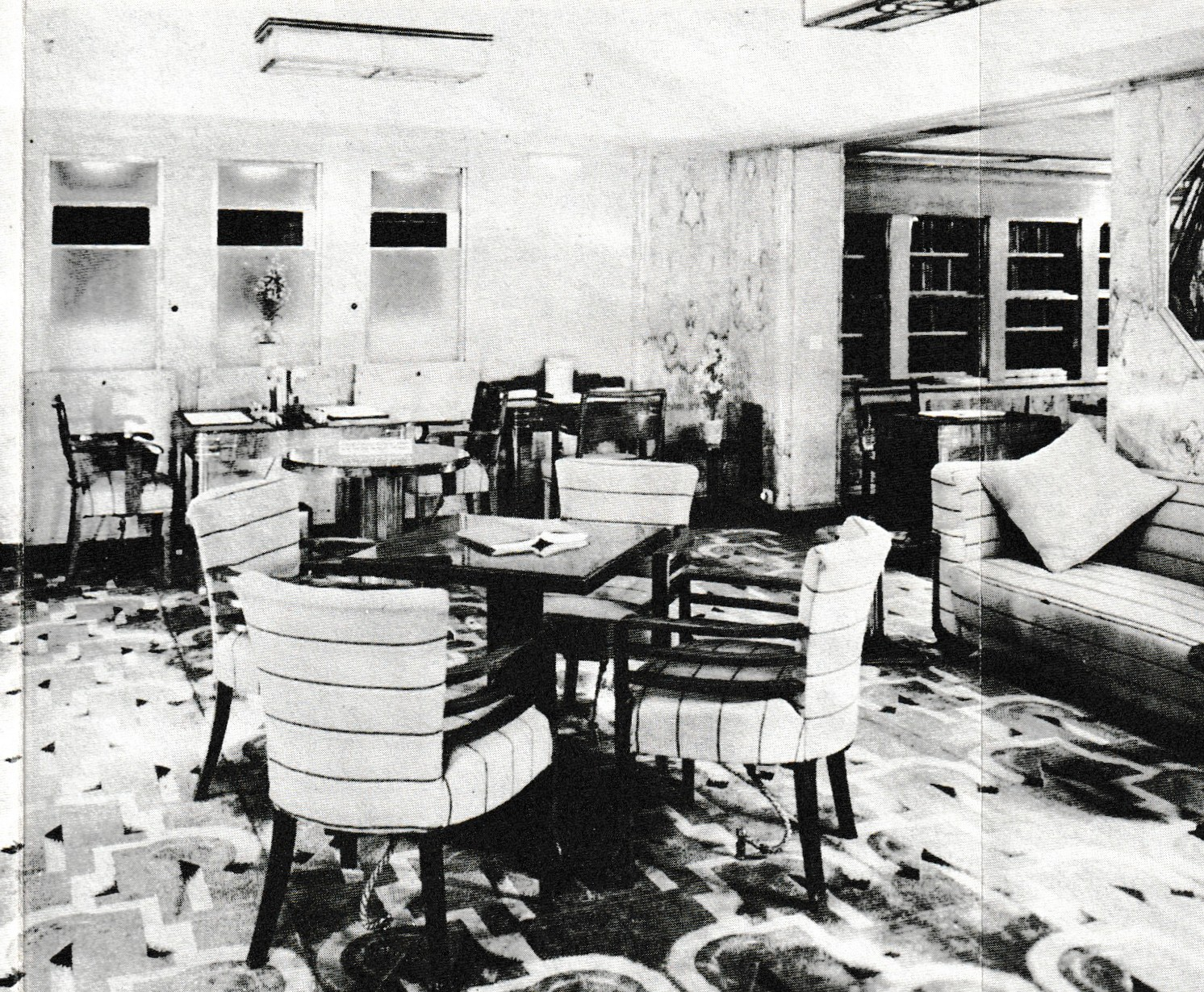
Cabin Class Library and Writing Room photographed during the 1930's.

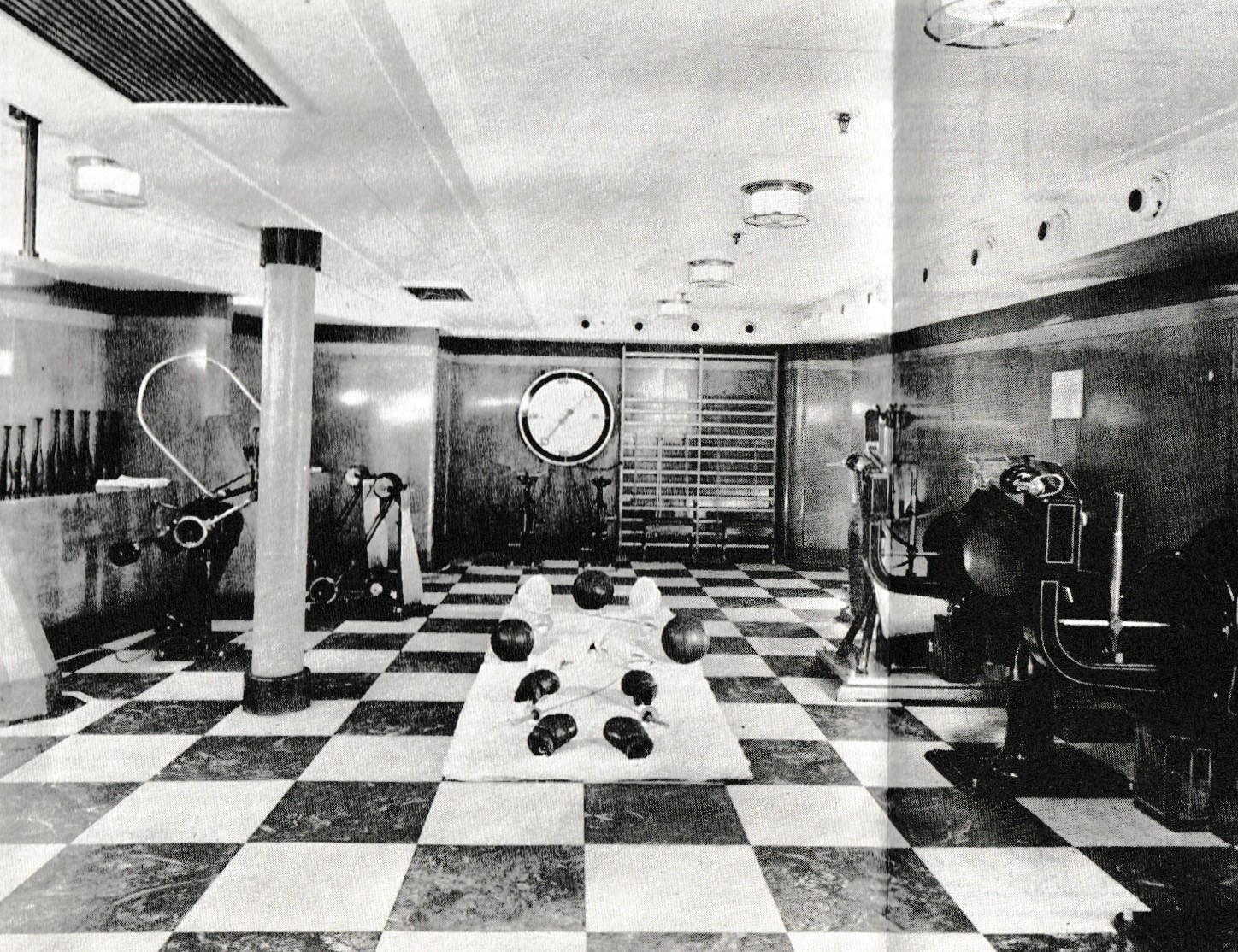
Cabin Class Gymnasium photographed during the 1930's.

== World War II ==
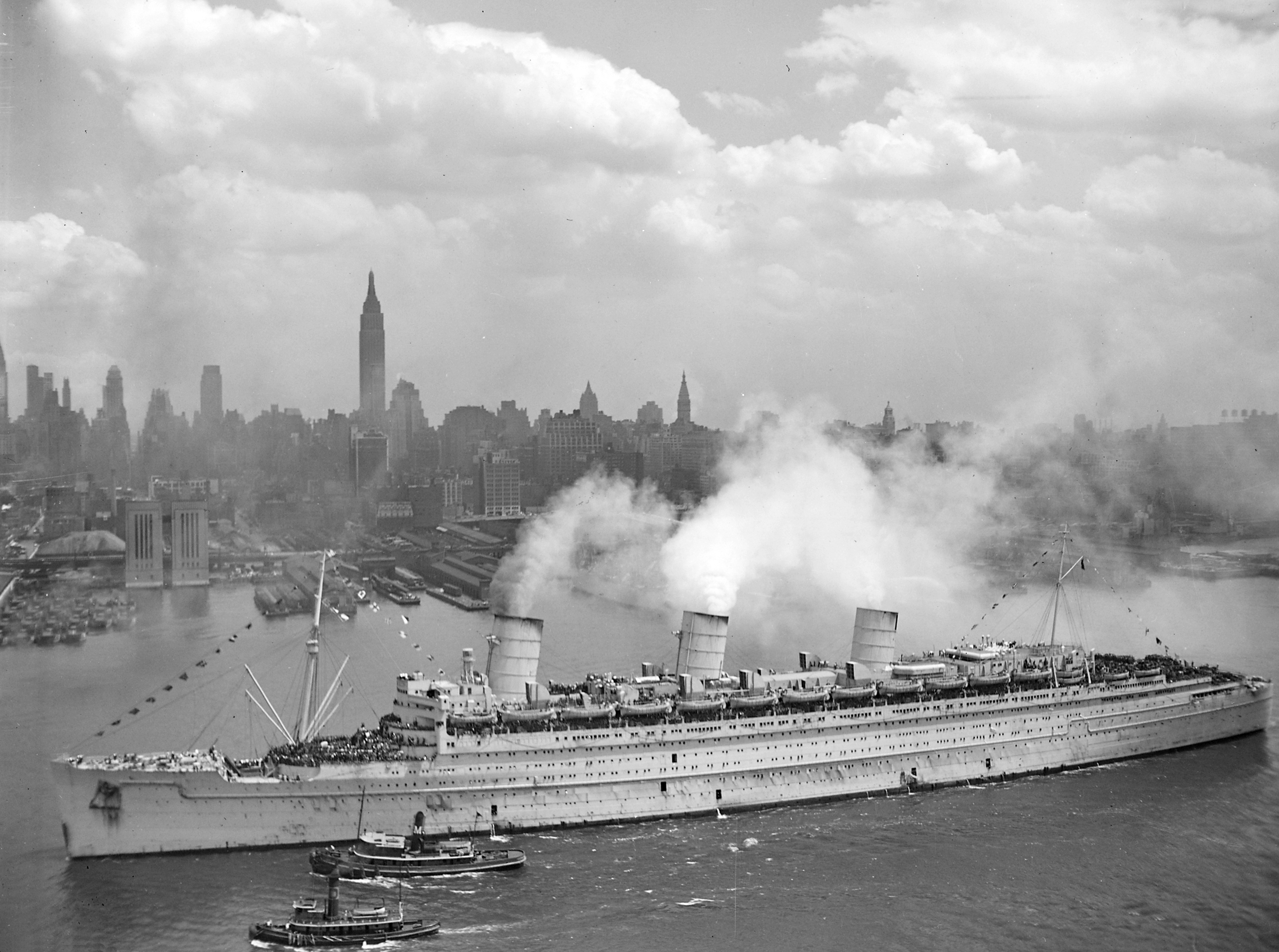
Arriving in New York Harbor, 20 June 1945, with thousands of US soldiers

In late August 1939, Queen Mary was on a return run from New York to Southampton. The international situation led to her being escorted by the battlecruiser HMS Hood. She arrived safely and set out again for New York on 1 September. By the time she arrived, war had been declared and she was ordered to remain in port alongside Normandie until further notice.

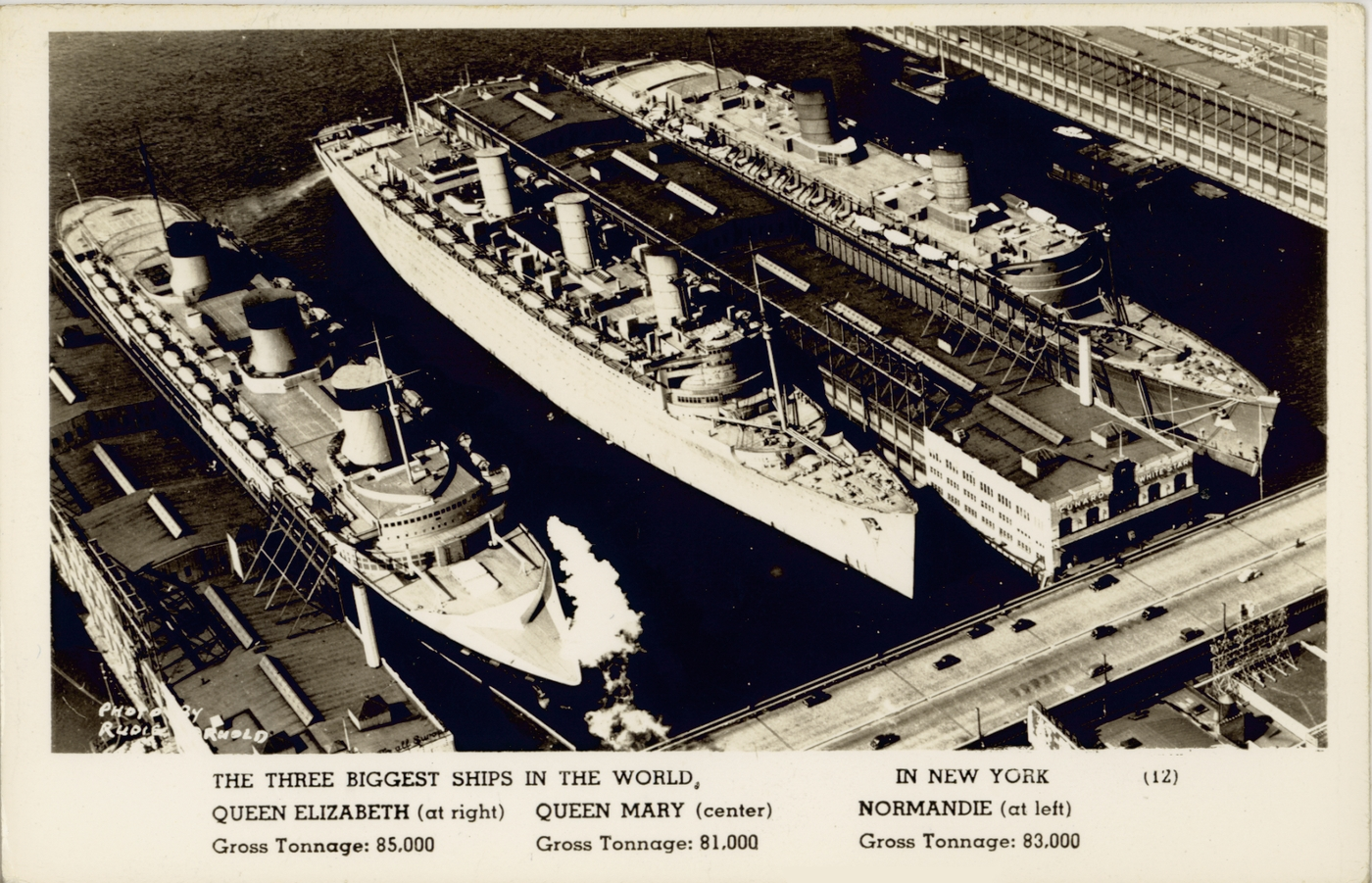
Normandie, Queen Mary and Queen Elizabeth in New York in 1940, docked due to the war

In March 1940, Queen Mary and Normandie were joined in New York by Queen Mary's new running mate Queen Elizabeth, fresh from her secret voyage from Clydebank. The three largest liners in the world sat idle for approximately two weeks when Queen Mary left for Sydney, Australia. Once there, along with several other liners, was converted into a troopship to carry Australian and New Zealand soldiers to the United Kingdom.

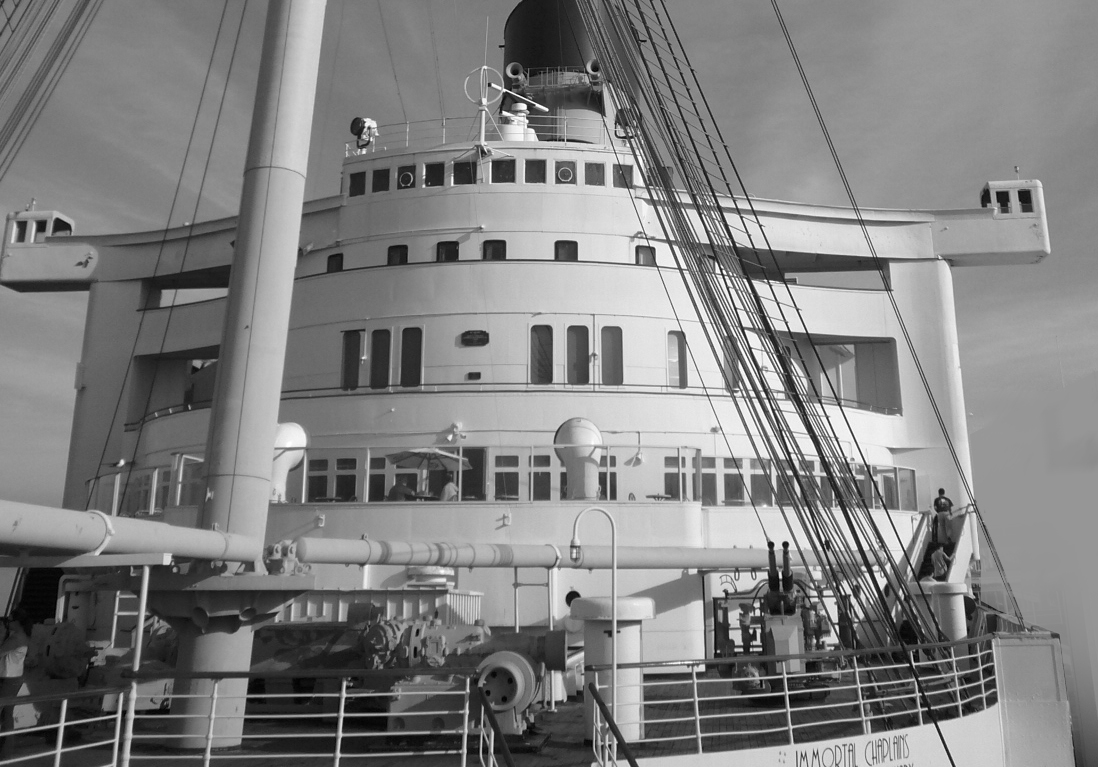
Queen Mary's forward superstructure, shown here in Long Beach. When she came to Long Beach, the Sun Deck windows were enlarged and an anti-aircraft gun was placed on display astride the foremast to represent the Second World War days of the liner

In the conversion, the ship's hull, superstructure, and funnels were painted navy grey. As a result of her new colour, and in combination with her great speed, she became known as the "Grey Ghost". To protect against magnetic mines, a degaussing coil was fitted around the outside of the hull. Inside, stateroom furniture and decoration were removed and replaced with triple-tiered (fixed) wooden bunks, which were later replaced by "standee" (fold-up) bunks.

A total of 6 miles (10 km) of carpet, 220 cases of china, crystal and silver services, tapestries, and paintings were removed and stored in warehouses for the duration of the war. The woodwork in the staterooms, the cabin-class dining room, and other public areas were covered with leather.

Queen Mary and Queen Elizabeth were the largest and fastest troopships involved in the war, often carrying as many as 15,000 men in a single voyage, and often travelling out of convoy and without escort. The Queens' high speed and zigzag courses made it virtually impossible for U-boats to catch them, although one attempted to attack the ship. On 25 May 1944, U-853 spotted Queen Mary and submerged to attack, but the ship outran the U-boat before it could do so. Because of their importance to the war effort, Adolf Hitler offered a bounty of 1 million Reichsmarks and Oak Leaves to the Knight's Cross, Germany's highest military honour, to any U-boat captain that sank either ship.

On 2 October 1942, Queen Mary accidentally sank one of her escort ships, slicing through the light cruiser HMS Curacoa off the Irish coast with a loss of 338 lives. Queen Mary was carrying thousands of Americans of the 29th Infantry Division to join the Allied forces in Europe. Due to the risk of U-boat attacks, Queen Mary was under orders not to stop under any circumstances and steamed onward with a fractured stem. Some sources claim that hours later, the convoy's lead escort, consisting of Bramham and one other ship, returned to rescue 99 survivors of Curacoa's crew of 437, including her captain John W. Boutwood. This claim is contradicted by the liner's then Staff Captain Harry Grattidge, who recorded that Queen Mary's Captain, Gordon Illingsworth, immediately ordered the accompanying destroyers to look for survivors within moments of Curacoa's sinking.

Later that year, from 8–14 December 1942, Queen Mary carried 10,389 soldiers and 950 crew (total 11,339). During this trip, on 11 December, while 700 miles (1,100 km) from Scotland during a gale, she was suddenly broadsided on her starboard side by a rogue wave that might have reached a height of 28 metres (92 ft). An account of this crossing can be found in Carter's book. As quoted in the book, Carter's father, Dr. Norval Carter, part of the 110th Station Hospital on board at the time, wrote in a letter that at one point Queen Mary "damned near capsized... One moment the top deck was at its usual height and then, swoom! Down, over, and forward she would pitch." It was calculated later that the ship rolled 52 degrees, and would have capsized had she rolled another three degrees.

From 25 to 30 July 1943, Queen Mary carried 15,740 soldiers and 943 crew (total 16,683), a standing record for the most passengers ever transported on one vessel. This was only possible in summer as passengers had to sleep on deck.

During the war, Queen Mary carried British prime minister Winston Churchill across the Atlantic three times for meetings with fellow Allied forces officials. He was listed on the passenger manifests as "Colonel Warden". On one crossing in 1943, Churchill and his staff planned the Normandy Invasion and he signed the D-Day Declaration aboard. Churchill later stated that the Queens, "challenged the fury of Hitlerism in the battle of the Atlantic. Without their aid, the day of final victory must unquestionably have been postponed." By the war's end, Queen Mary had carried over 800,000 troops and travelled over 600,000 miles across the world's oceans.

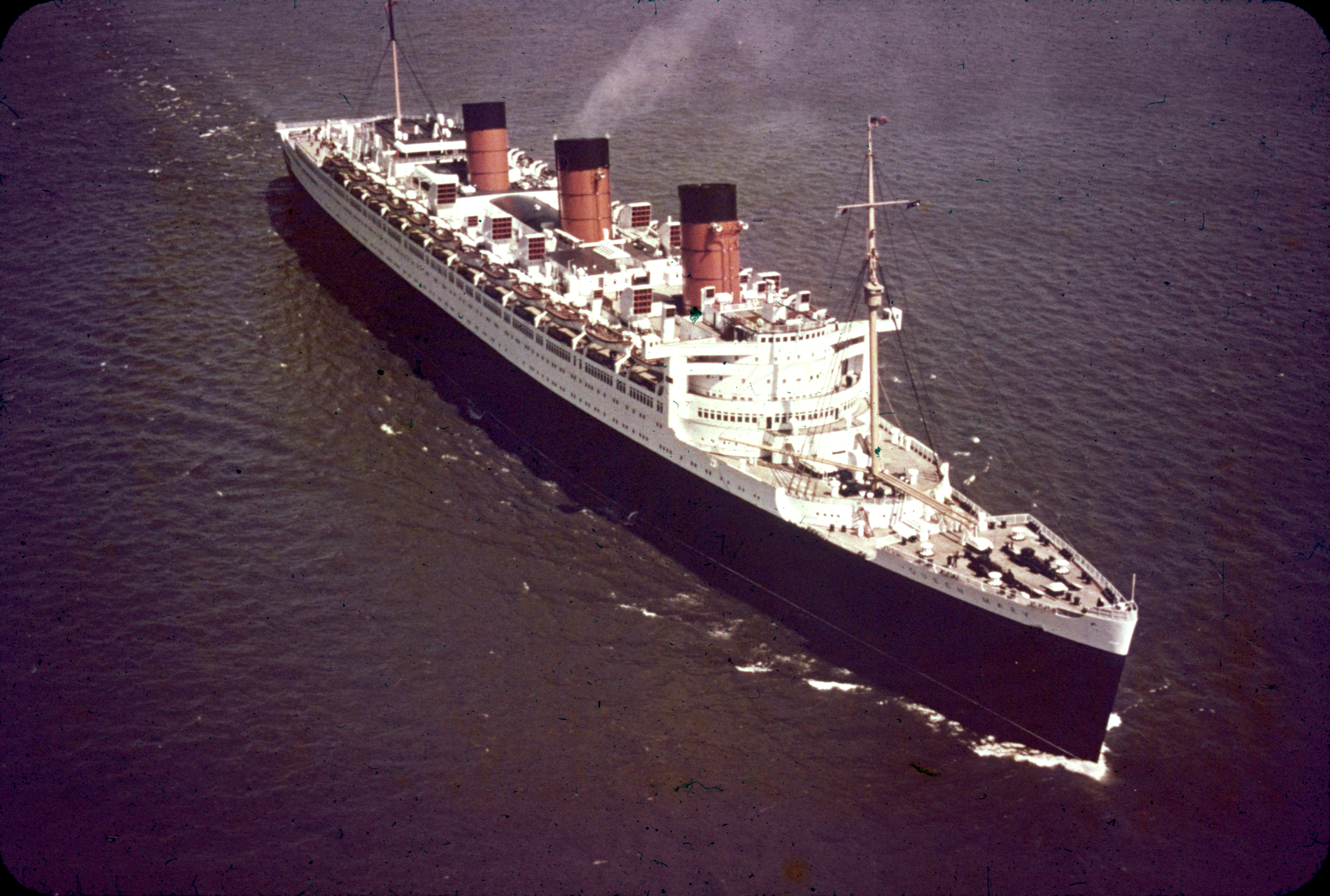
Queen Mary in 1965

== After World War II ==
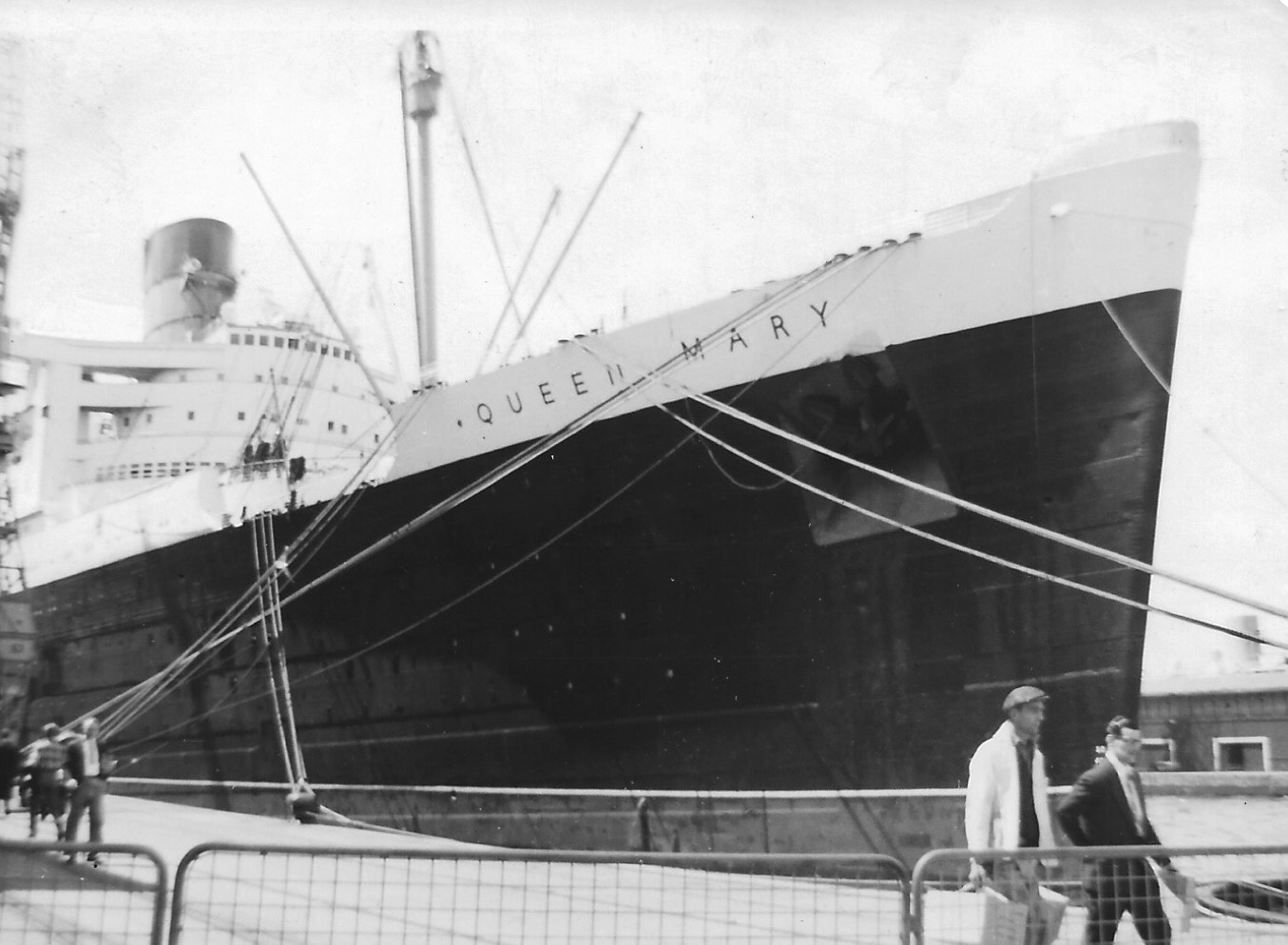
Queen Mary at Southampton, 1960

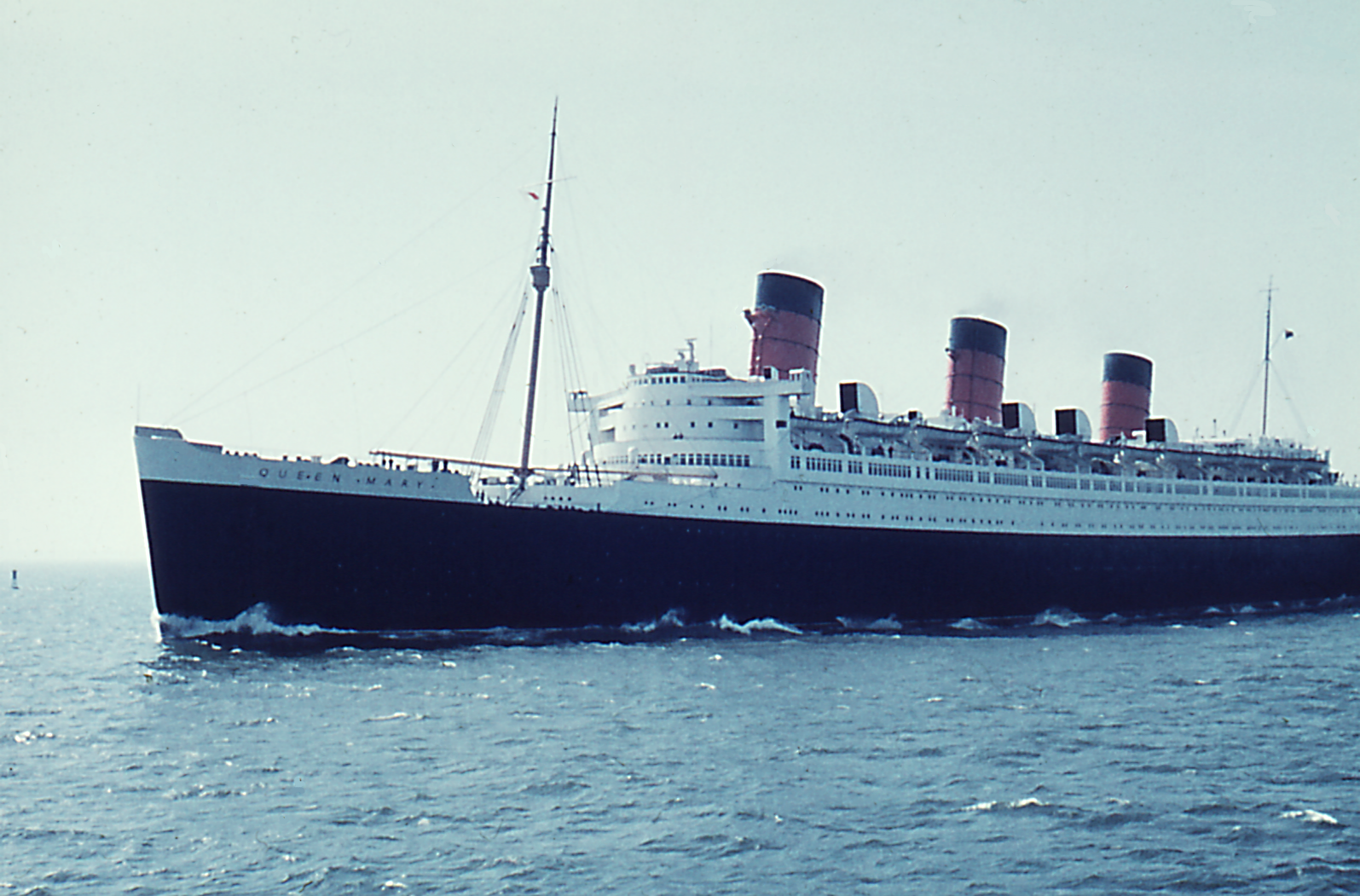
Queen Mary on the North Sea, 1959

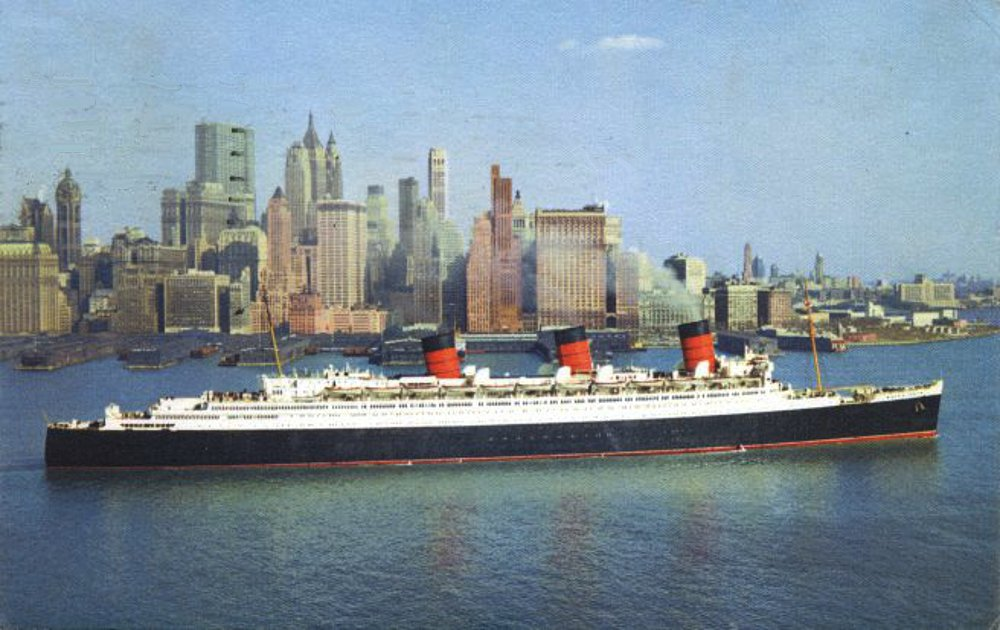
Queen Mary at New York, 1961

After delivering war brides to Canada, Queen Mary made her fastest ever crossing, returning in early 1946 to Southampton in only three days, 22 hours and 42 minutes at an average speed of 31.9 kn (59.1 km/h; 36.7 mph). From September 1946 to July 1947, Queen Mary was refitted for passenger service, adding air conditioning and upgrading her berth configuration to 711 first class (formerly called cabin class), 707 cabin class (formerly tourist class) and 577 tourist class (formerly third class) passengers. Doris Zinkeisen retouched the mural in the Verandah Grill, which had been damaged by gunnery officers tacking charts to the poster board that covered it. She reportedly painted a mouse so there would always be a mouse on the Queen Mary, a joke reference to Cunard's claim to proudly have no rodents on their ships.

Following their refit, Queen Mary and Queen Elizabeth dominated the transatlantic passenger trade as Cunard White Star's two-ship weekly express service through the latter half of the 1940s and well into the 1950s. They proved highly profitable for Cunard (as the company was renamed on 31 December 1949).

On 1 January 1949, Queen Mary ran aground off Cherbourg, France. She was refloated the next day and returned to service.

In 1952, on the maiden voyage of SS United States, Queen Mary lost the Blue Riband to the new American liner, the record had been held by the Cunarder for 14 years.

On 29 January 1955, she took aboard two injured crew members from the Panamanian Liberty ship Liberator. In 1958, the first commercial transatlantic flights by jet began a completely new era of competition for passenger liners. With a London–New York travel time reduced to just 7–8 hours, demand for multi-day ocean crossing dropped precipitously. On some voyages, winters especially, Queen Mary sailed into harbour with more crew than passengers, though both she and Queen Elizabeth still averaged over 1,000 passengers per crossing into the middle 1960s. By 1965, the entire Cunard fleet was operating at a loss.

Hoping to continue financing Queen Elizabeth 2, which was under construction at Brown's shipyard, Cunard mortgaged the majority of the fleet. Due to a combination of age, lack of public interest, inefficiency in a new market, and the damaging after-effects of the national seamen's strike, Cunard announced that both Queens would be retired from service and sold off. Many offers for Queen Mary were submitted, and the bid of $3.45m/£1.2m from Long Beach, California surpassed the Japanese scrap merchants. Queen Mary was featured in the film Assault on a Queen (1966) starring Frank Sinatra. That August, Queen Mary made her fastest eastbound passage since August 1938, crossing in 4 days, 10 hours and 6 minutes at an average speed of 29.46 knots (54.56 km/h).

Queen Mary was retired from service in 1967. On 27 September 1967, Queen Mary completed her 1,001st and last crossing of the North Atlantic, having carried 2,112,000 passengers over 3,295,355 nautical miles (3,792,227 mi; 6,102,997 km). Under the command of Captain John Treasure Jones, who had been her captain since 1965, she sailed from Southampton for the last time on 31 October with 1,093 passengers and 806 crew. After a voyage around Cape Horn, she arrived in Long Beach on 9 December. Queen Elizabeth was withdrawn in 1968 and Queen Elizabeth 2 took over the transatlantic route in 1969.

== Post-retirement ==
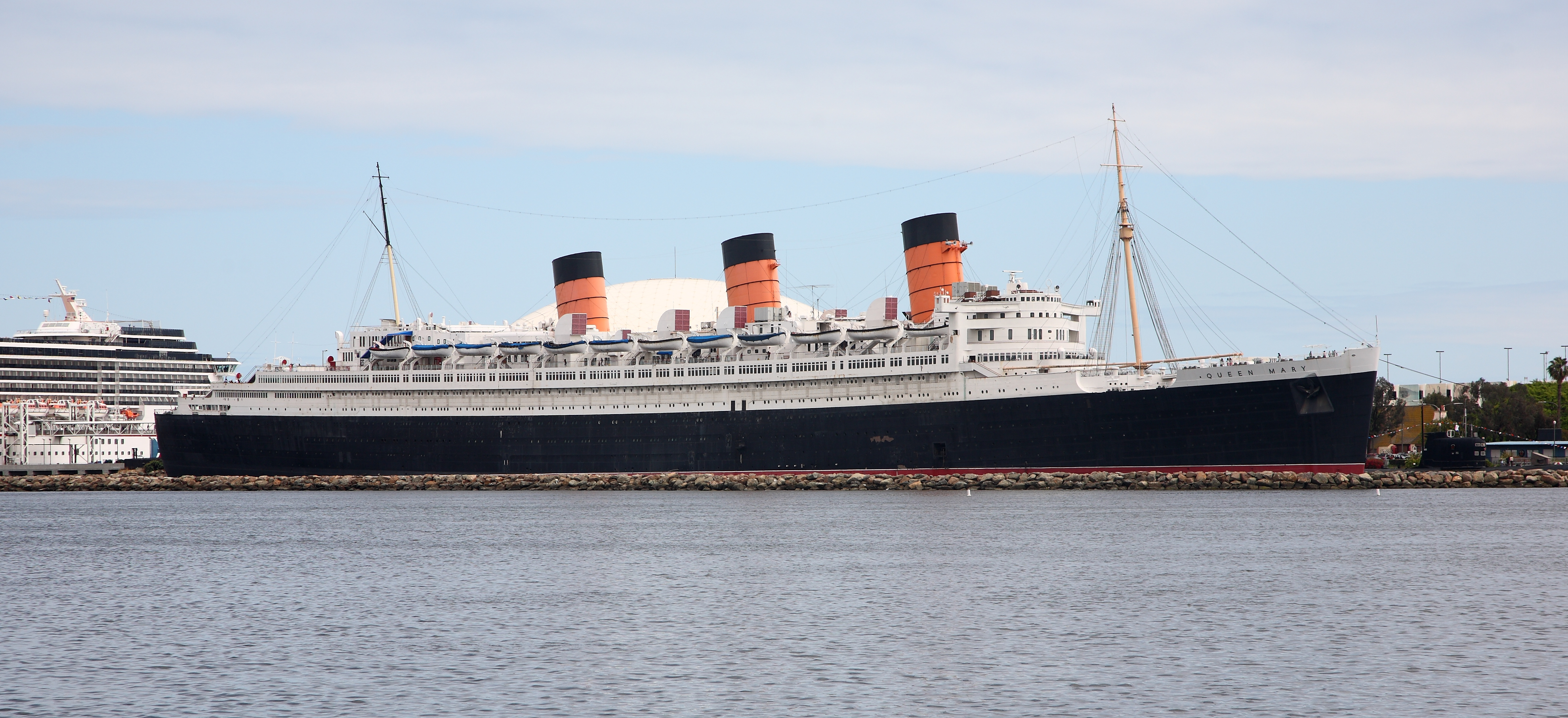
Queen Mary from the northern side of Long Beach harbour in 2008

Queen Mary is permanently moored in Long Beach as a tourist attraction, hotel, museum and event facility.

=== Conversion ===
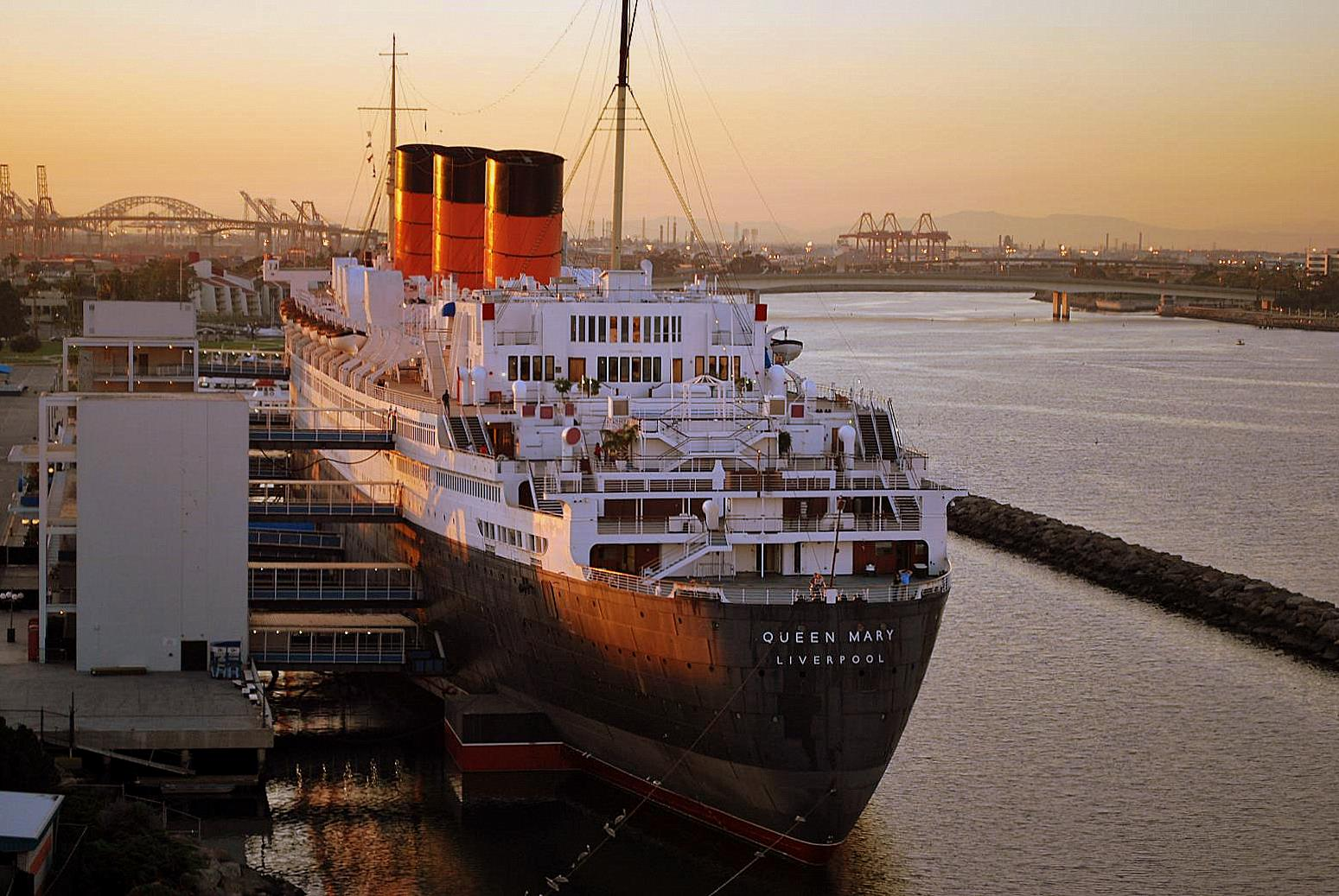
Queen Mary from the stern in 2010

Queen Mary, bought by Long Beach in 1967, was converted from a seafaring vessel to a floating hotel. The plan included clearing almost every area of the ship below "C" deck (called "R" deck after 1950, to lessen passenger confusion, as the restaurants were located on "R" deck) to make way for Jacques Cousteau's new Living Sea Museum. This increased museum space to 400,000 square feet (37,000 m^{2}).

It required the removal of all the boiler rooms, the forward engine room, both turbo generator rooms, the ship stabilisers and the water softening plant. The ship's empty fuel tanks were filled with local mud to keep the ship's centre of gravity and draft at the correct levels, as these critical factors had been affected by the removal of the various components and structure. Only the aft engine room and "shaft alley", at the stern of the ship, was spared. The remaining space was used for storage or office space.

One problem that arose during the conversion was a dispute between land-based and maritime unions over conversion jobs. The United States Coast Guard had the final say. Queen Mary was deemed a building, since most of her propellers had been removed and her machinery gutted. The ship was also repainted with its red water level paint at a slightly higher level than during her service years. During the conversion, the funnels were removed, as this area was needed to lift out the scrap materials from the engine and boiler rooms. Workers found that the funnels were significantly degraded, and they were replaced with replicas.

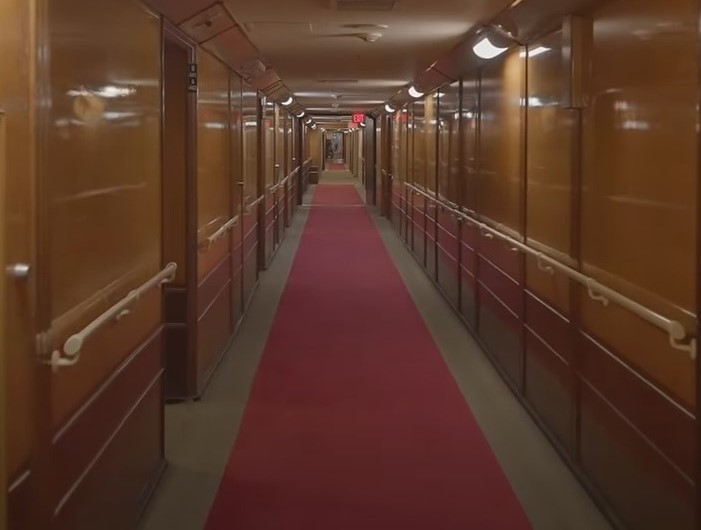
Passageway in first-class accommodation, now part of the onboard hotel, as of January 2024.

With all of the lower decks nearly gutted from R deck and down, Diners Club, the initial lessee of the ship, converted the remainder of the vessel into a hotel. In 1969, it was reported that the hotel would be operated by Sky Chefs, the catering and hospitality division of American Airlines. Diners Club Queen Mary dissolved and vacated the ship in 1970 after their parent company, Diners Club International, was sold, and a change in corporate direction was mandated during the conversion process. Specialty Restaurants, a Los Angeles-based company that focused on theme-based restaurants, took over as master lessee the following year.

This second plan was based on converting most of her first- and second-class cabins on A and B decks into hotel rooms, and converting the main lounges and dining rooms into banquet spaces. On Promenade Deck, the starboard promenade was enclosed to feature an upscale restaurant and café named Lord Nelson's and Lady Hamilton's; it was themed in the fashion of early-19th century sailing ships. The famed and elegant Observation Bar was redecorated as a western-themed bar.

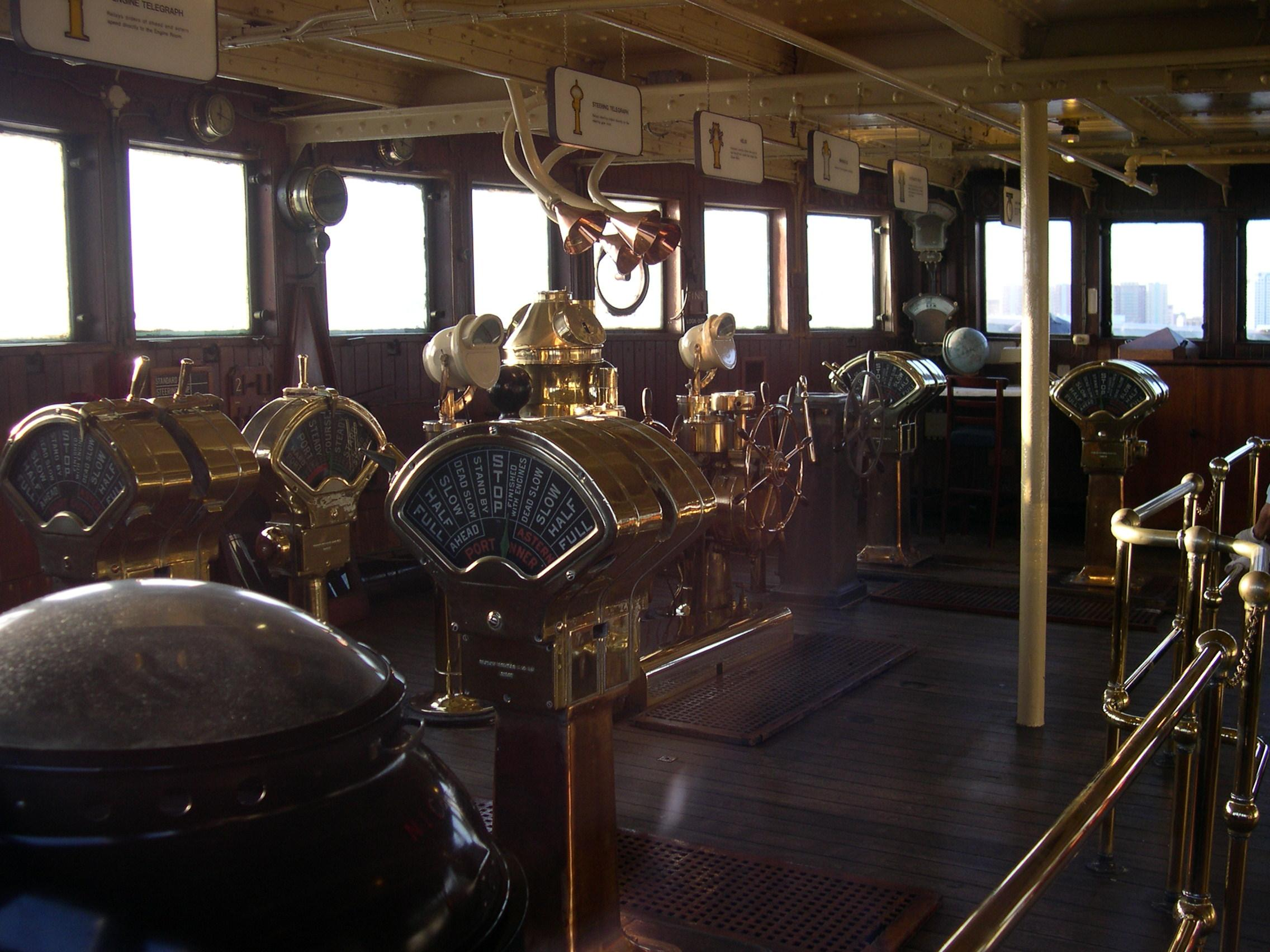
Queen Mary's bridge in 2005

The smaller first-class public rooms, such as the Drawing Room, Library, Lecture Room and the Music Studio, were stripped of most of their fittings and converted to commercial use. This markedly expanded retail space on the ship. Two more shopping malls were built on the Sun Deck in separate spaces previously used for first-class cabins and engineers' quarters.

A post-war feature of the ship, the first-class cinema, was removed for kitchen space for the new Promenade Deck dining venues. The first-class lounge and smoking room were reconfigured and converted into banquet space. The second-class smoking room was subdivided into a wedding chapel and office space. On the Sun Deck, the elegant Verandah Grill was gutted and converted into a fast-food eatery, while a new upscale dining venue was created directly above it on Sports Deck, in space once used for crew quarters.

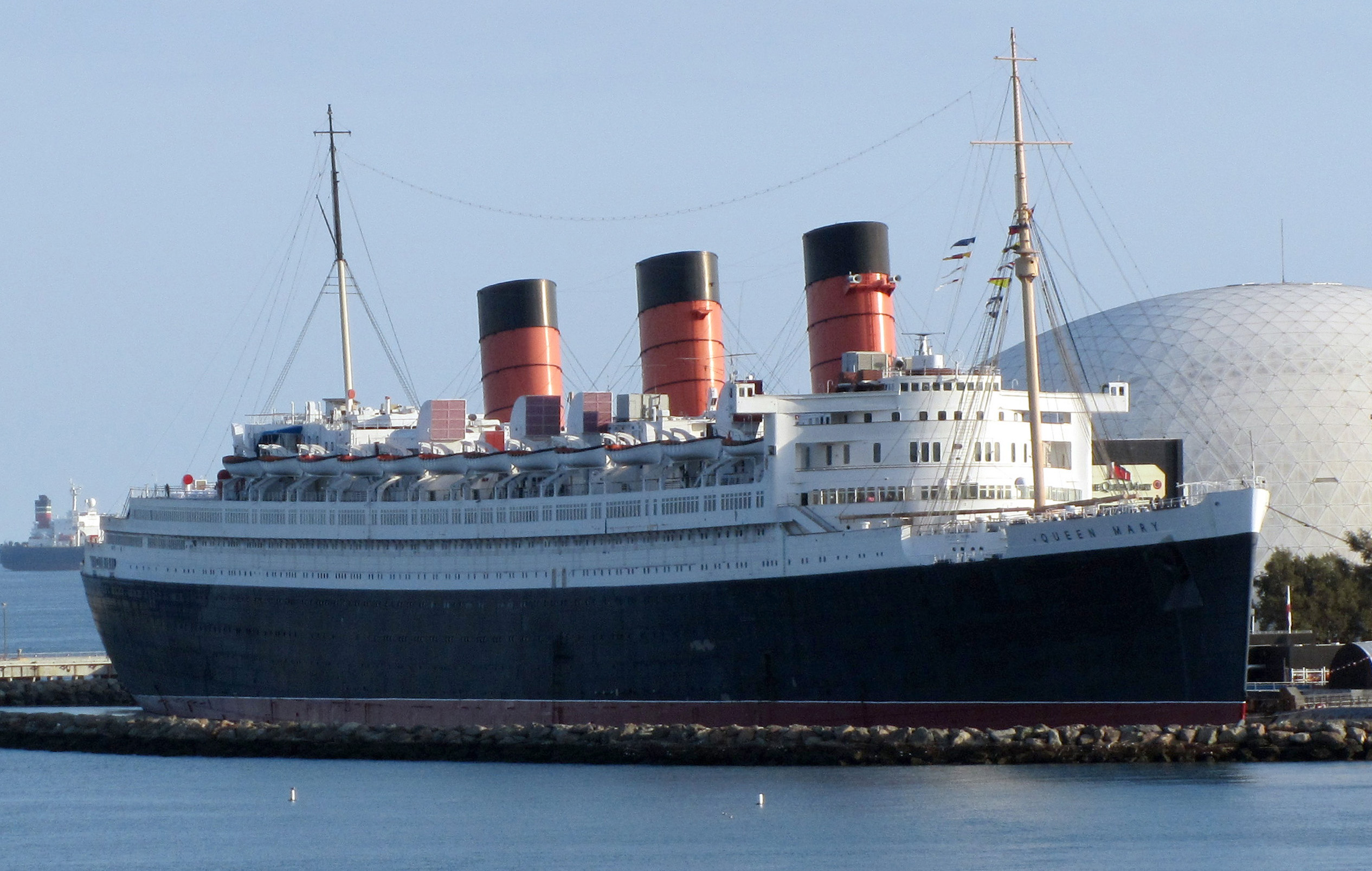
Queen Mary in Long Beach is alongside the Cruise Terminal

The second-class lounges were expanded to the sides of the ship and used for banqueting. On R deck, the first-class dining room was reconfigured and subdivided into two banquet venues, the Royal Salon and the Windsor Room. The second-class dining room was subdivided into kitchen storage and a crew mess hall, while the third-class dining room was initially used as storage and crew space.

Also on R deck, the first-class Victorian Turkish baths complex, the 1930s equivalent to a spa, was removed. The second-class pool was removed and its space initially used for office space, while the first-class swimming pool was open for viewing by hotel guests and visitors. Because of modern safety codes and the compromised structural soundness of the area directly below, the swimming pool could not be used for swimming after the conversion, although it was filled with water until the late 1980s. Today the pool can only be seen on guided tours and from the first class entrance on R deck. No second-class, third-class or crew cabins remain intact aboard the ship today.

=== Opening as a tourist destination ===
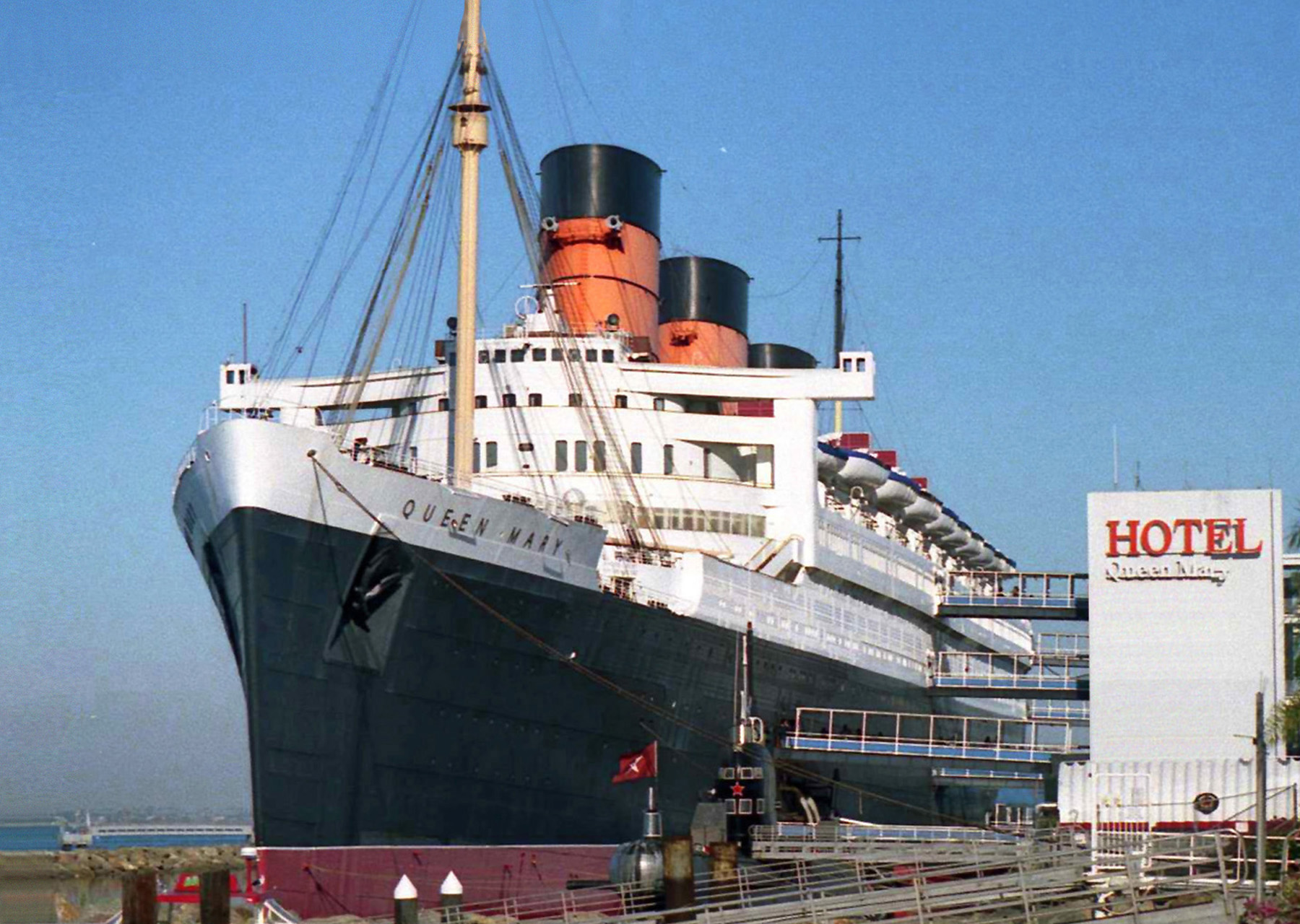
Ship as a hotel, with permanent boarding gangways in 2009

On 8 May 1971, Queen Mary opened her doors to tourists. Initially, only portions of the ship were open to the public as Specialty Restaurants had yet to open its dining venues and PSA had not completed work converting the ship's original First Class staterooms into the hotel. As a result, the ship was open only on weekends. On 11 December 1971, Jacques Cousteau's Museum of the Sea opened, with a quarter of the planned exhibits completed. Within the decade, Cousteau's museum closed due to low ticket sales and the deaths of many of the fish that were housed in the museum. On 2 November 1972, the PSA Hotel Queen Mary opened its initial 150 guest rooms. Two years later, with all 400 rooms finished, PSA brought in Hyatt Hotels to manage the hotel, which operated from 1974 to 1980 as the Queen Mary Hyatt Hotel.

By 1980, it had become apparent that the existing system was not working. The ship was losing millions each year for the city because the hotel, restaurants and museum were run by three separate concessionaires, while the city owned the vessel and operated guided tours. It was decided that a single operator with more experience in attractions was needed.

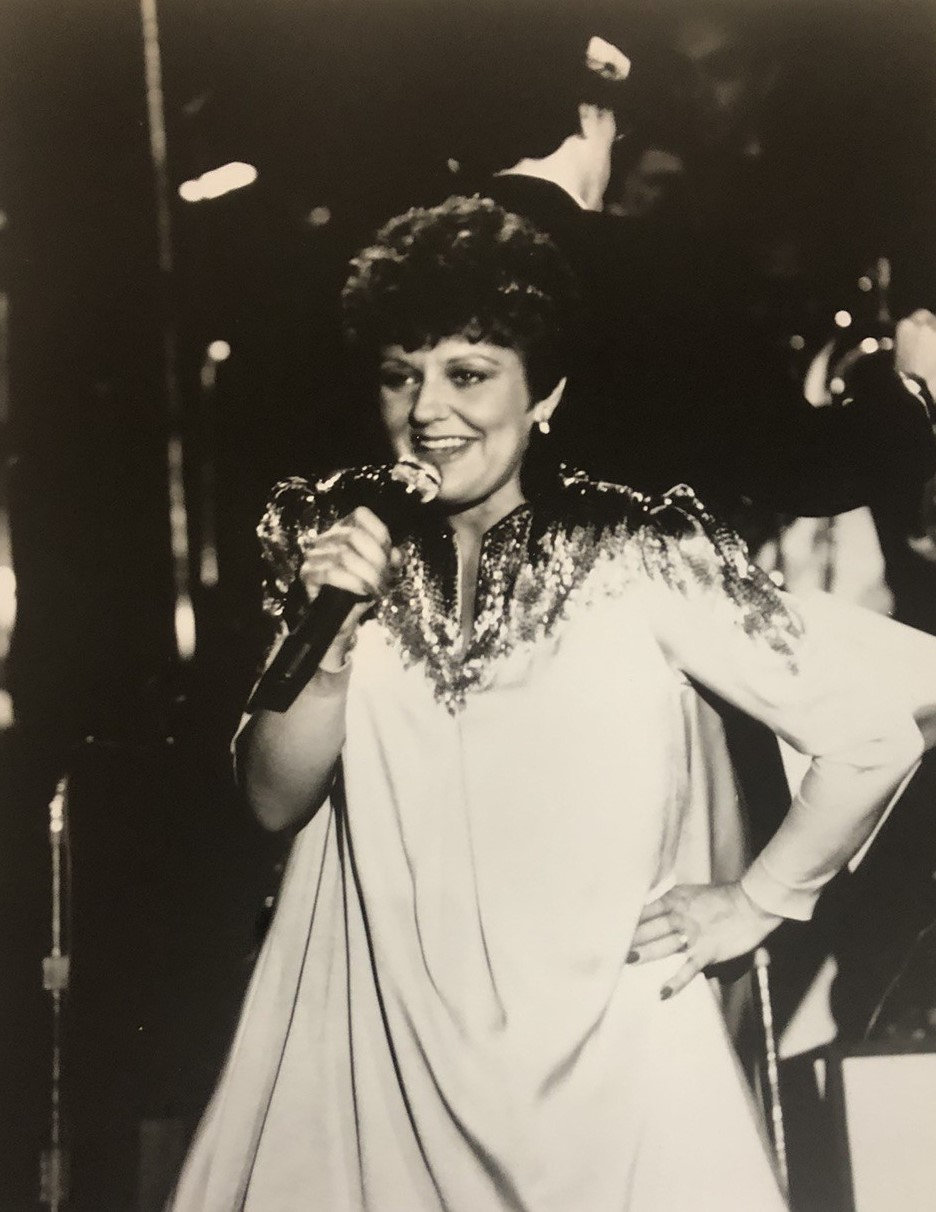
Pudgy filming The Unpredictable Pudgy! aboard the ship, 1983

Jack Wrather, a local millionaire, had fallen in love with the ship because he and his wife, Bonita Granville, had fond memories of sailing on it numerous times. Wrather signed a 66-year lease with the city of Long Beach to operate the entire property. He oversaw the display of the H-4 Hercules, nicknamed the Spruce Goose, on long-term loan. The immense plane, which had been sitting in a hangar in Long Beach for decades unseen by the public, was installed in a huge geodesic dome adjacent to the liner in 1983, attracting increased attendance. Comedian Pudgy filmed her 1983 Showtime special The Unpredictable Pudgy! aboard the ship.

Wrather Port Properties operated the entire attraction after his death in 1984 until 1988, when his holdings were bought by the Walt Disney Company. Wrather had built the Disneyland Hotel in 1955, when Walt Disney had insufficient funds to construct the hotel himself. Disney had been trying to buy the hotel for 30 years. When they finally succeeded, they also acquired Queen Mary. This was never marketed as a Disney property. Through the late 1980s and early 1990s, Queen Mary struggled financially. Disney pinned their hopes for turning the attraction around on Port Disney, a huge planned resort on the adjacent docks. It was to include an attraction known as DisneySea, a theme park celebrating the world's oceans. The plans eventually fell through; in 1992 Disney gave up the lease on the ship to focus on building what would become Disney California Adventure Park. The DisneySea concept was recycled a decade later in Japan as Tokyo DisneySea, with a recreated ocean liner resembling Queen Mary named the SS Columbia as the centrepiece of the American Waterfront area.

=== 1992 closure and reopening ===
With Disney gone, the Hotel Queen Mary closed on 30 September 1992. The owners of the Spruce Goose, the Aero Club of Southern California, sold the plane to the Evergreen Aviation & Space Museum in McMinnville, Oregon. The plane departed on barges on 2 October 1992. The Queen Mary was closed indefinitely on 31 December 1992.

During this period, the ship was nominated and listed on the National Register of Historic Places in 1993. Also the Port of Long Beach turned over control of the vessel to the city in 1993.

On 5 February 1993, RMS Foundation, Inc signed a five-year lease with the city of Long Beach to act as the operators of the property. The foundation was run by President and C.E.O. Joseph F. Prevratil, who had managed the attraction for Wrather. On 26 February 1993 the tourist attraction reopened completely, while the hotel reopened partially on 5 March with 125 rooms and the banquet facilities, with the remainder of the rooms coming online on 30 April. In 1995, RMS Foundation's lease was extended to twenty years, while the scope of the lease was reduced to operation of the ship. A new company, Queen's Seaport Development, Inc. (QSDI), was established in 1995 to control the real estate adjacent to the vessel. The dome was used extensively as a soundstage for film and television by taking advantage of the adaptable interior space that was larger than any sound stage in the Los Angeles area. In 1998, the city of Long Beach extended the QSDI lease to 66 years. Carnival Cruises repurposed a portion of the dome as a passenger terminal in 2001. The California State Lands Commission also issued a report in response to citizens' concerns about the use of public trust lands and mismanagement of public trust funds. The report determined that the uses were not barred by the granting statutes or the public trust doctrine, but may be considered necessarily incidental to the enjoyment of public tidelands. They found no evidence of mismanagement, a conclusion that was reviewed and affirmed by the State Attorney General.

In 2004, Queen Mary and Stargazer Productions added Tibbies Great American Cabaret to the space previously occupied by the ship's bank and wireless telegraph room. Stargazer Productions and Queen Mary transformed the space into a working dinner theatre complete with stage, lights, sound and scullery.

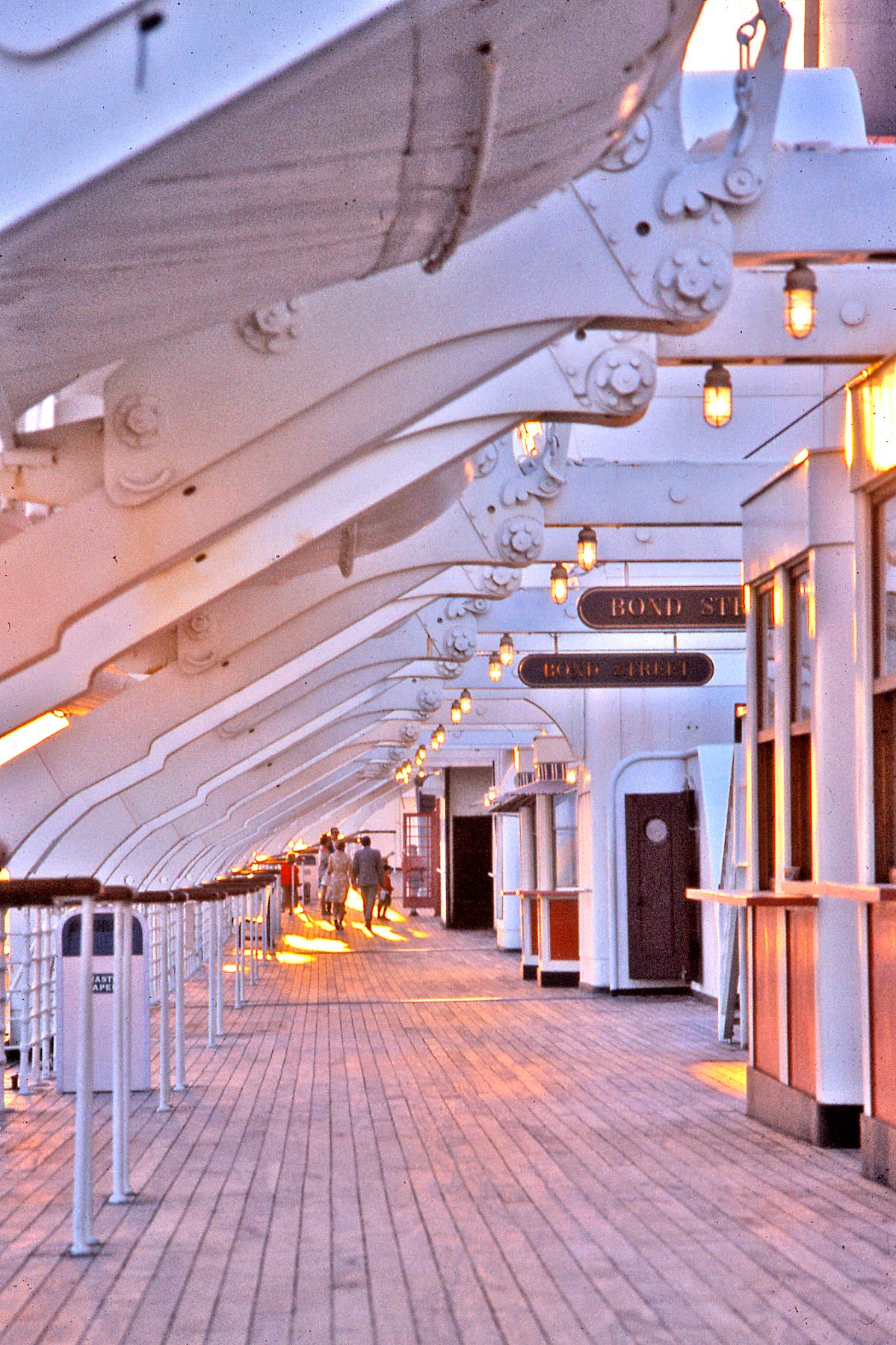
Starboard sun deck, 1972

In 2005, QSDI sought Chapter 11 protection due to a rent credit dispute with the city. In 2006, the bankruptcy court requested bids from parties interested in taking over the lease from QSDI. The minimum required opening bid was $41M. The operation of the ship, by RMS Foundation, remained independent of the bankruptcy. In summer 2007, Queen Mary's lease was sold to a group named "Save the Queen", managed by Hostmark Hospitality Group.

They planned to develop the land adjacent to Queen Mary, and upgrade, renovate and restore the ship. During their management, staterooms were updated with iPod docking stations, flatscreen TVs. The ship's three funnels and waterline area were also repainted to their original Cunard red colour. The portside Promenade Deck's planking was restored and refinished. Many lifeboats were repaired and patched, and the ship's kitchens were renovated with new equipment.

In late September 2009, management of Queen Mary was taken over by Delaware North Companies, who planned to continue the restoration and renovation of the ship and its property. They were determined to revitalise and enhance the ship as an attraction. But in April 2011, the city of Long Beach was informed that Delaware North was no longer managing Queen Mary. Garrison Investment Group said this decision was purely business. Delaware North continued to manage Scorpion, a Soviet submarine that has been a separate attraction next to Queen Mary since 1998. Evolution Hospitality, LLC. assumed operational control of Queen Mary on 23 September 2011, with Garrison Investments leasing Queen Mary. The dome was used as a venue for the Long Beach Derby Gals roller derby team and as an event venue.

=== 2006 meeting of the two Queen Marys ===
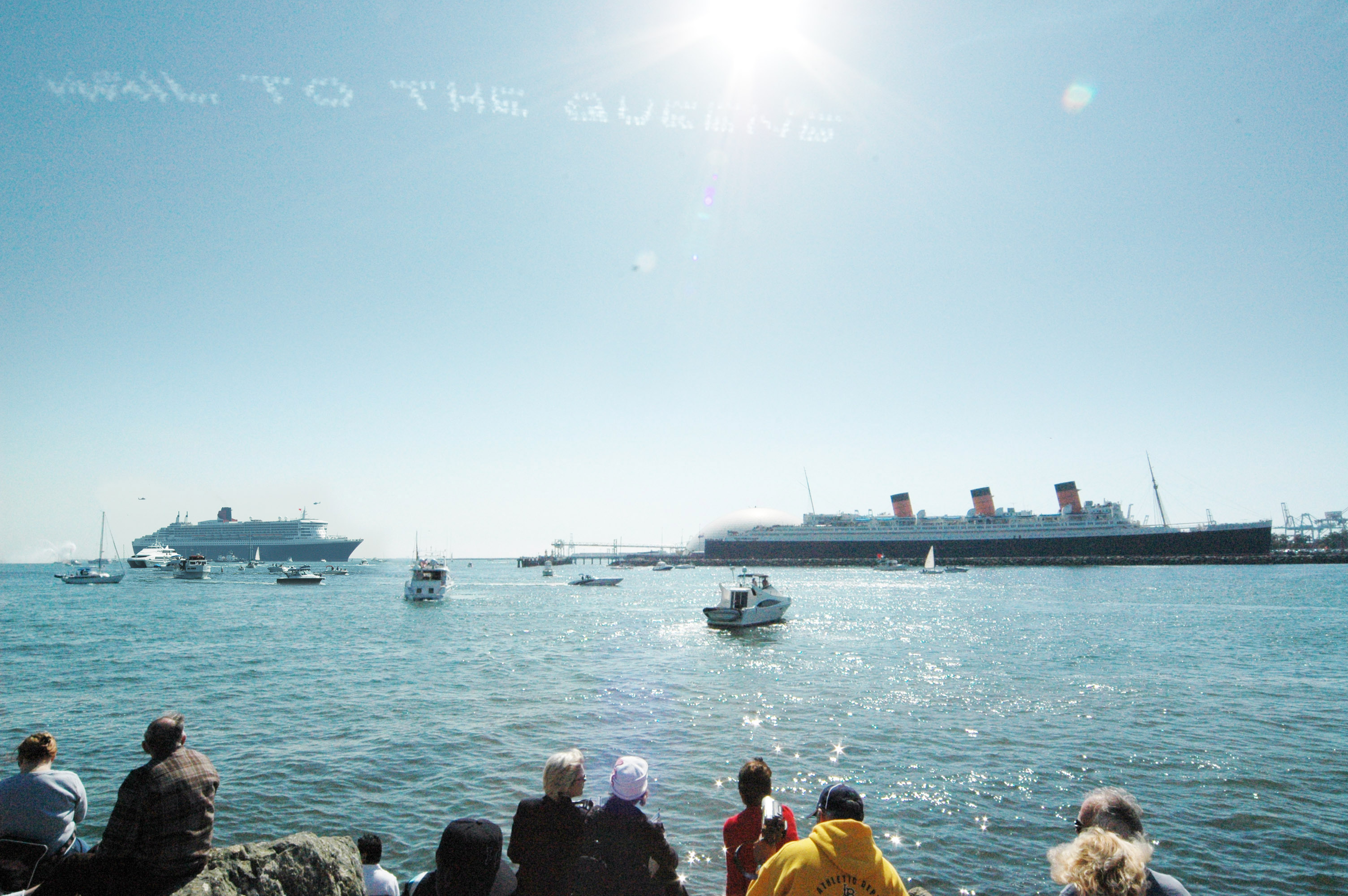
RMS Queen Mary 2 approaching the Queen Mary at her berth, 23 February 2006, under a salute of "HAIL TO THE QUEENS" in skywriting.

On 23 February 2006, RMS Queen Mary 2 saluted her predecessor as she made a port of call in Los Angeles Harbor, while on a cruise from South Africa to Mexico.

The salute was carried out with Queen Mary replying with her one working air horn in response to Queen Mary 2 sounding her combination of two brand new horns and an original 1934 Queen Mary horn, which is on loan from the City of Long Beach. Queen Mary originally had three whistles tuned to 55 Hz, a frequency chosen because it was low enough that the extremely loud sound of it would not be painful to human ears.

Modern IMO regulations specify ships' horn frequencies to be in the range 70–200 Hz for vessels that are over 200 metres (660 ft) in length. Traditionally, the lower the frequency, the larger the ship. Queen Mary 2, being 1,132 feet (345 m) long, was given the lowest possible frequency (70 Hz) for her regulation whistles, in addition to the refurbished 55 Hz whistle on permanent loan. 55 Hz is the "A" note an octave above the lowest note of a standard piano keyboard. The air-driven Tyfon whistle can be heard at least 10 miles (16 km) away.

In March 2011, Queen Mary was saluted by MS Queen Victoria and fireworks, and on 12 March 2013, MS Queen Elizabeth made a similar fireworks accompanied salute.

=== 2016 lease to Urban Commons ===
In 2016, Urban Commons, a real estate company, bought the lease, which extended to 2082, out of default. The lease obligated them to perform the ship's daily upkeep and long-term projects. Carnival Cruises took over the entire dome and made efficiency improvements under their management. The operator generated funds through its events, the hotel bookings, and passenger fees from the nearby Carnival cruise terminal, which was the largest source. Taxpayer funds were not being used to maintain the ship under the lease agreement. Urban Commons had plans to extensively renovate the liner and to redevelop the adjacent 45 acres (18 ha) of parking with a boutique hotel, restaurants, a marina, an amphitheater, jogging trails, bike paths and possibly a huge Ferris wheel, all at a cost of up to $250 million.

In May 2019, Urban Commons formed Eagle Hospitality Real Estate Trust with the goal of generating up to $566 million for the Queen Mary along with its portfolio of 12 other hotel properties that it owns or manages. In December 2019, it was announced that the city was reviewing the finances of Urban Commons to determine whether the City of Long Beach had "received all revenues owed."

=== 2017 condition ===
In 2017, a report on the ship's condition was issued. The report observed that, not only the hull, but also the supports for a raised exhibition area within the ship were corroding and that the ship's deteriorating condition left areas such as the engine room vulnerable to flooding. Repair costs were estimated at close to $300 million. In November 2016 the City of Long Beach had put $23 million toward addressing Queen Mary's most vital repairs. John Keisler, economic and property development director for Long Beach, said: "We have a timeline in which the engineers believe they can complete those immediate projects. These are major challenges we can only address over time; it can't all be done at once." Political leaders in Scotland, birthplace of Queen Mary, called for the then UK prime minister Theresa May to pressure the American government to fund a full repair of the liner in 2017.

In August 2019, Edward Pribonic, the engineer responsible for inspecting Queen Mary on behalf of the City of Long Beach, issued a report stating that the ship was in the worst condition he had seen in his 25 years on the job. Pribonic stated that the neglect of Queen Mary had grown worse under the management of Urban Commons, and concluded that "without an immediate and very significant infusion of manpower and money, the condition of the ship will likely soon be unsalvageable." Incidents of recent neglect include the flooding of the Grand Ballroom with sewage after a pipe which was flimsily patched with duct tape burst, significant amounts of standing water in the ship's bilge, and recently applied paint on the ship's funnels already peeling because of the poor way in which it was applied. The pessimistic conclusion of Pribonic was disputed by city officials, who called the warnings "hyperbolic" and pointed to the "significant" work that has already been undertaken towards repairing Queen Mary.

The $23 million apportioned for repairs ran out in 2018, with 19 out of the 27 urgent projects identified by a 2015 marine survey completed as of September 2019. There were significant cost overruns overall, with the cost of fire safety repairs increasing from the original estimate of $200,000 to $5.29 million. Two of the remaining eight issues identified in 2015 were considered "critical" – this includes the removal of the ship's lifeboats, which were rotted and in danger of collapsing.

In October 2019, the City of Long Beach warned Urban Commons that the company was failing to uphold its commitment to maintain and repair Queen Mary and that it was accordingly in danger of defaulting on its 66-year lease agreement. Urban Commons responded with an updated plan for repairs, including the removal of the lifeboats at a cost of between $5 and $7 million, and new paint work.

=== 2020 closure and reopening ===
The Queen Mary ceased operations in May 2020, due to the COVID-19 pandemic. As overseer for several corporations that operated the Queen Mary, Eagle Hospitality Trust filed a motion in federal bankruptcy court on 9 March 2021 to auction off its lease. Court filings by the city claimed that Urban Commons' repair work was incomplete or not performed correctly and would likely have to be redone. Also, the current condition of the vessel was such that significant safety repairs needed to be performed before it could reopen to the public. In court filings, Eagle Hospitality Trust stated that the lease was their most valuable asset. There were no bidders on the lease after all of Eagle's other hotel properties were sold at a bankruptcy court auction. Eagle Hospitality Trust agreed to surrender its lease agreement back to the city, and Long Beach took back control in June 2021. To keep the ship running, the city approved a $2 million, six-month contract with Evolution Hospitality to cover monthly utility fees, security, landscaping and other costs. Simultaneously, the city contracted with Evolution Hospitality, a hotel management company that had been managing the daily operations of the ship since 2011, to act as caretaker.

An architecture and marine engineering firm hired by the city found that $23 million was needed for urgent safety repairs to keep the ship viable over the next two years. The report by Elliott Bay Design Group reported that the vessel was vulnerable to flooding or possibly even capsizing. On 21 September 2021, the Long Beach City Council voted to explore turning the Queen Mary and surrounding property over to the Harbor Department. Transfer of the ship and the surrounding land from city control to the port would include Pier H. An urgent removal of the deteriorated lifeboats was completed as they were putting stress on the side shell of the ship which has created cracks in the support system. Of the 22 lifeboats then on the ship, 15 were original while the remaining 7 were from other ships. Although the city offered the lifeboats to various groups, none were able to meet the city's removal requirements. Consequently, the city saved 11 of the original lifeboats for restoration and scrapped the remaining 11 (4 originals and 7 non-originals).

In June 2022, the city established a new agreement with Evolution Hospitality where company managed the ship for a portion of the revenues while the city controlled repair and restoration of the ship. By November, the city had spent $2.8 million for plumbing repairs, a new Wi-Fi connection, handrail restoration and energy-efficient lightbulbs. This also included beginning work on the ship's boilers and heat exchangers. The city approved $1 million to continue repairs to the ship's linoleum flooring and carpet, refrigerators, elevators, kitchen exhaust hoods, and guest room locks.

=== Reopening and new investments ===
The Queen Mary reopened for limited tours on 15 December 2022, and formally reopened to the public on 1 April 2023. Later in the month, the city announced that the ship and Pier H would remain with the city with the port being a partner. The repairs, along with increased tourism, led the Queen Mary to earn over $3.5 million in operating profits from April – December 2023. In 2024, the Queen Mary was inducted into the Historic Hotels of America registry for its historical significance. In February 2025, the City of Long Beach approved an agreement with the Queen Mary Heritage Foundation, a nonprofit organization dedicated to the ship's preservation, allowing it to fundraise and carry out restoration projects aboard the vessel without requiring individual City Council approvals. Under this arrangement, the foundation will focus on restoring artwork, furnishings, and historic fixtures, while structural repairs remain under the city's oversight.

=== 2026 meeting with Queen Mary 2 ===
On February 2, 2026, Queen Mary 2 reunited with Queen Mary for the first time in 20 years for a "Royal Rendezvous" and to celebrate the 90th anniversary of Queen Mary's maiden voyage. Like the 2006 event, a fireboat was present, and the two Queens exchanged a whistle salute heard throughout Long Beach. The following day, in honour of the 20th anniversary rendezvous, Dr. Stephen Payne, the designer of QM2, lectured aboard Queen Mary in an event co-organized by broadcaster and The Expert Cruise Show co-host Anthony Davis.

== Amateur radio room ==
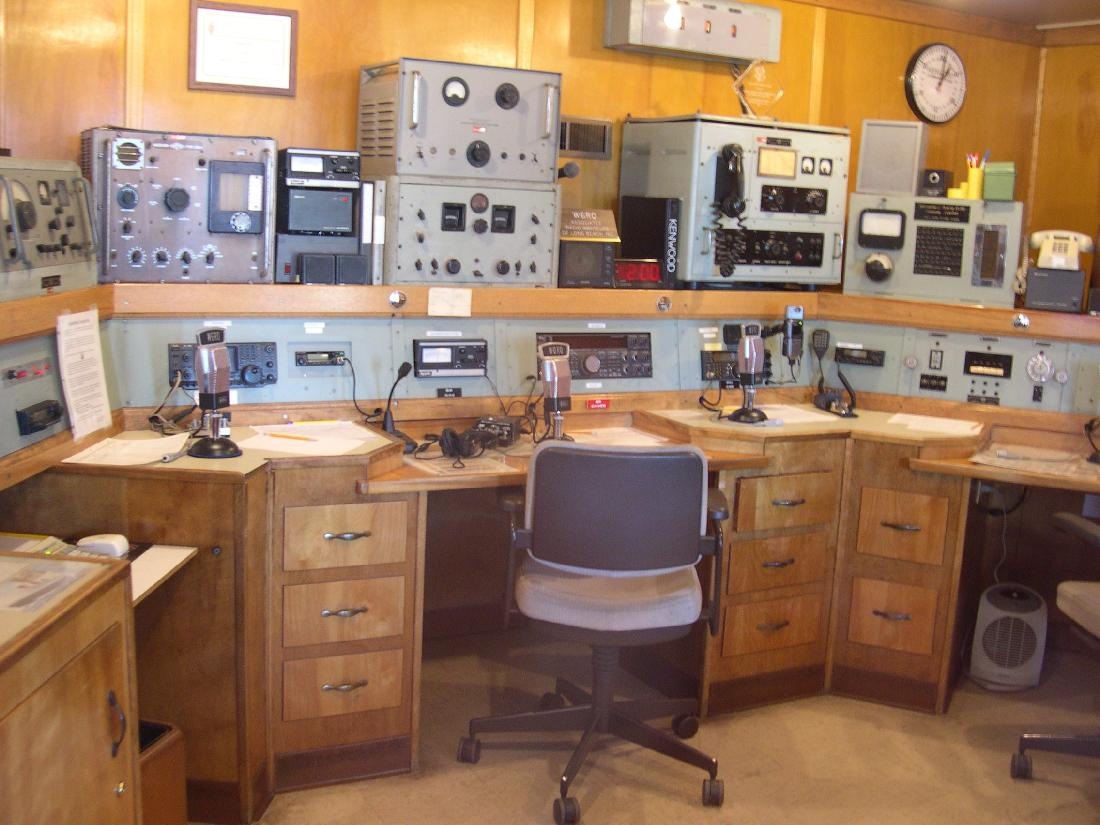
Queen Mary's relocated, amateur-manned, modern-equipped Wireless radio room

Queen Mary's original professionally manned wireless radio room was removed when the ship was moored in Long Beach. In its place, an amateur radio room proposed by Long Beach resident and radio amateur Nate Brightman, K6OSC, was created one deck above the original radio reception room, with some of the discarded original radio equipment used for display purposes. The new Wireless Room was opened for operation on 22 April 1979. The amateur radio station, with the call sign W6RO ("Whiskey Six Romeo Oscar"), relies on volunteers from a local amateur radio club. They staff the radio room during most public hours. The radios can also be used by other licensed amateur radio operators.

In honour of his over forty years of dedication to W6RO and Queen Mary, in November 2007 the Queen Mary Wireless Room was renamed as the Nate Brightman Radio Room. This was announced on 28 October 2007, at Brightman's 90th birthday party by Joseph Prevratil, former president and CEO of Queen Mary.

== Alleged hauntings ==
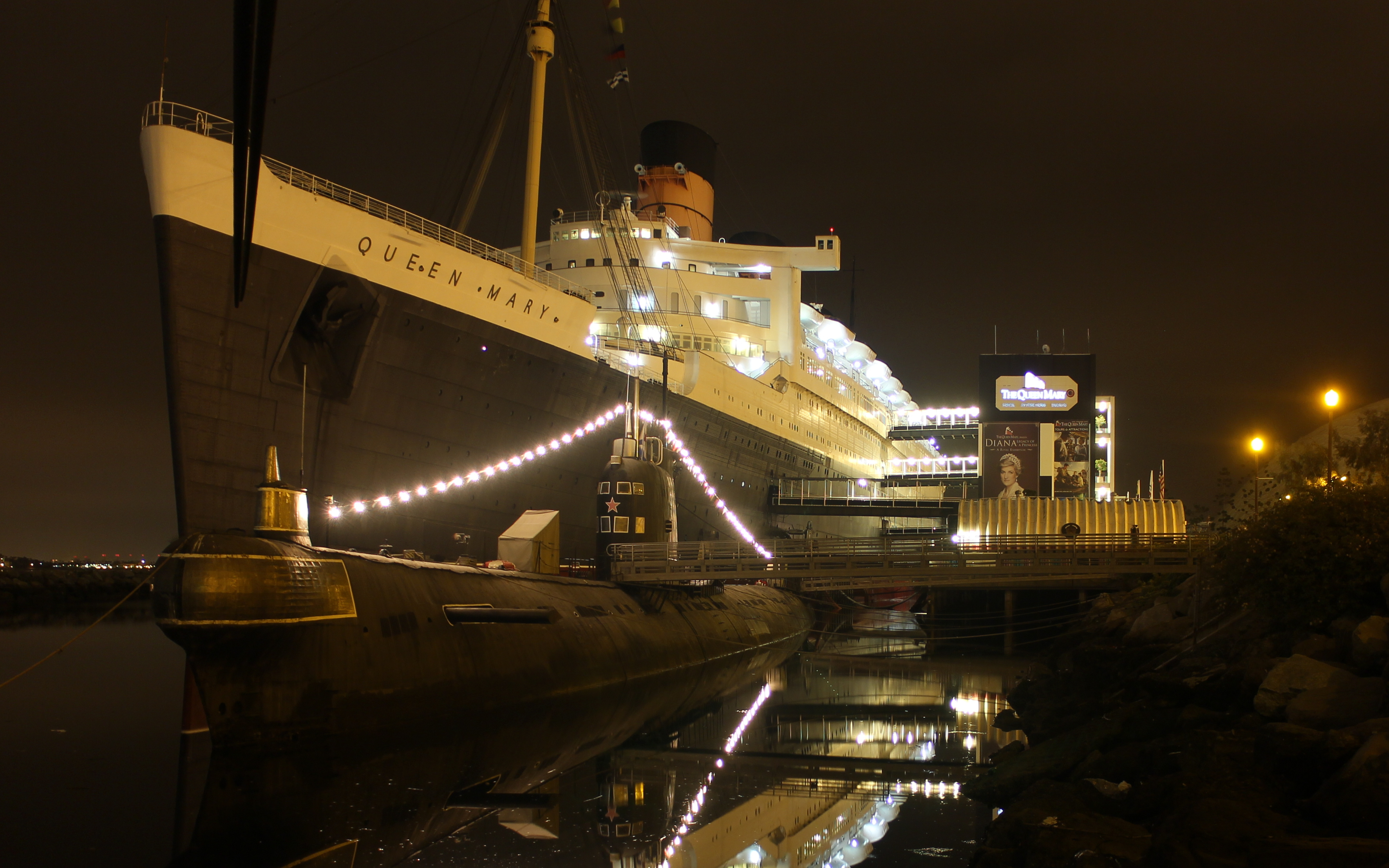
The Queen Mary with the Soviet submarine B-427, since closed to the public

Following Queen Mary's permanent docking in California, claims were made that the ship was haunted. These claims began in earnest in the 1980s (possibly done by employees to increase business or spook guests) and have grown since then. For example, in 2008, Time magazine included the Queen Mary among its "Top 10 Haunted Places". One of the staterooms is alleged to be haunted by the spirit of a person supposedly murdered there. Other legends include a young girl who haunts the ship's former second class pool and a father who murdered his two daughters on board.

However, there is no historical record to support these claims as no person was murdered aboard the ship. Most deaths aboard the ship were due to natural causes. The Center for Inquiry fellow Joe Nickell attributes the Queen Mary's haunting legends to pareidolia, illusory mental images triggered by subjective feelings, and daydreaming commonly experienced by workers doing repetitive chores.

== See also ==
Ships that are berthed

- Hikawa Maru – As a museum in Yokohama, Japan
- Minghua (former Ancerville) – As a hotel in Shenzhen, China
- SS Rotterdam – As a hotel in Rotterdam, the Netherlands

== Notes ==
Records
Preceded by Normandie	Blue Riband (Westbound record); 1936–1937	Succeeded by Normandie
Preceded by Normandie	Blue Riband (Eastbound record); 1936–1937	Succeeded by Normandie
Preceded by Normandie	Blue Riband (Westbound record); 1938–1952	Succeeded by United States
Preceded by Normandie	Blue Riband (Eastbound record); 1938–1952	Succeeded by United States
