= HMS Menestheus =

Cargo ship that was converted into a minelayer and amenities ship

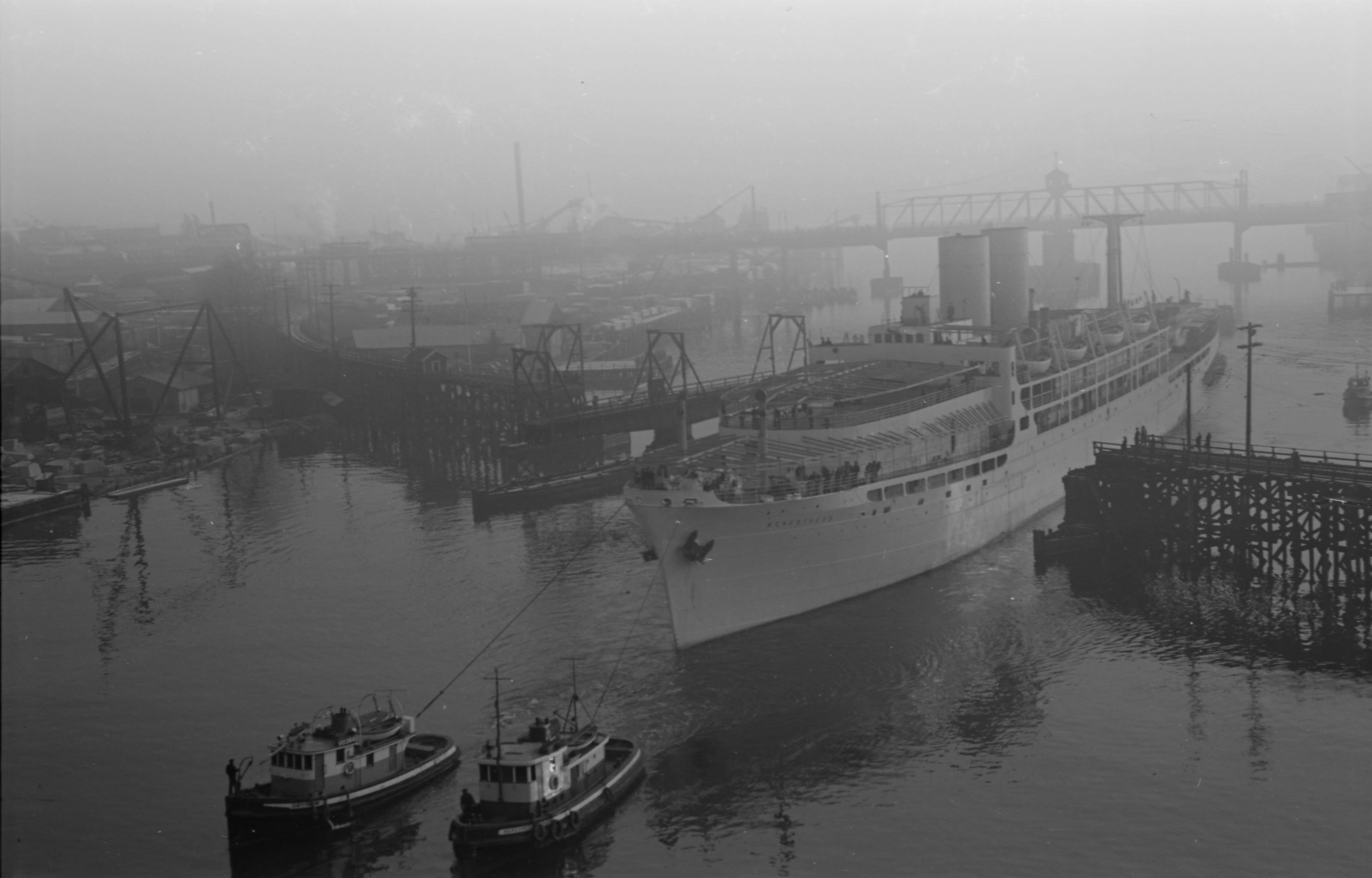
- HMS Menestheus in 1945 as an amenities ship

History

United Kingdom
- Name: Menestheus
- Namesake: Menestheus
- Owner: Ocean SS Co Ltd
- Operator: 1929: A Holt & Co; 1940: (United Kingdom) Royal Navy; 1946: A Holt & Co
- Port of registry: (United Kingdom) Liverpool
- Builder: Caledon Sb & Eng Co, Dundee
- Yard number: 326
- Launched: 6 August 1929
- Completed: December 1929
- Commissioned: into Royal Navy, 1940
- Decommissioned: returned to owners, 1946
- Identification: UK official number 161134; code letters LPHV; call sign GBDT; 1940: pennant number M93
- Fate: Burnt out in 1953, then scrapped

General characteristics
- Type: 1929: refrigerated cargo ship; 1940: auxiliary minelayer
- Tonnage: 7,771 GRT, 4,818 NRT, 9,140 DWT
- Length: 560.0 ft (170.7 m)
- Beam: 59.4 ft (18.1 m)
- Depth: 29.2 ft (8.9 m)
- Decks: 2
- Installed power: 1,295 NHP
- Propulsion: 2 × screws; 2 × four-stroke diesel engines
- Speed: 15.5 knots (28.7 km/h)
- Crew: 81 (as cargo ship)
- Sensors & processing systems: by 1933: wireless direction finding; by 1937: echo sounding device; by 1953: radar
- Armament: 3 × 4-inch guns; 2 × 2-pounder guns; 12 × Oerlikon 20 mm cannon; 438 × mines
- Notes: sister ships: Agamemnon, Deucalion, Memnon, Ajax

HMS Menestheus was originally the Blue Funnel Line refrigerated cargo ship Menestheus. She was built in 1929, and traded between the UK and the Far East. She was an auxiliary minelayer from 1940 to 1943. In 1945, during the Second World War, she was converted into an amenities ship. She was scrapped in 1953 after being gutted by fire.

She was the first of three Blue Funnel Line ships to be named after Menestheus, the legendary king of Athens during the Trojan War. She was the only Royal Navy ship to be called Menestheus.

== Five sister ships ==
Between 1929 and 1931 Blue Funnel Line had a class of five cargo ships built to the same design by four different UK shipyards. Menestheus was the second of the five. Caledon Shipbuilding & Engineering Company built her in Dundee as yard number 326, launching her in August 1929 and completing her that September.

The first of the class was Agamemnon, built by Workman, Clark and Company in Belfast. She was launched on 25 April 1929, and completed that September. The others were Deucalion, launched by R. & W. Hawthorn, Leslie and Company in Hebburn in July 1930; Memnon, launched by Caledon in Dundee in October 1930; and Ajax, launched by Scotts Shipbuilding and Engineering Company in Greenock in December 1930.

== Menestheus as built ==
Menestheus' registered length was 560.0 ft (170.7 m), her beam was 59.4 ft (18.1 m) and her depth was 29.2 ft (8.9 m). Her tonnages were 7,771 GRT, 4,818 NRT and 9,140 DWT.

Menestheus was a twin-screw motor ship. She had two eight-cylinder Burmeister & Wain four-stroke single-acting diesel engines. Between them, her twin engines were rated at 1,295 NHP. The engines were supercharged on the Büchi and Rateau systems, which increased their bhp from 6,600 to 8,600. This gave Agamemnon a speed of 15.5 knots (28.7 km/h).

Blue Funnel Line registered Menestheus at Liverpool. Her UK official number was 161134, and until 1933 her code letters were LFHV. By 1930 she also had the wireless telegraph call sign GBDT. Her navigation equipment included wireless direction finding by 1933, and an echo sounding device by 1937.

== Naval service ==
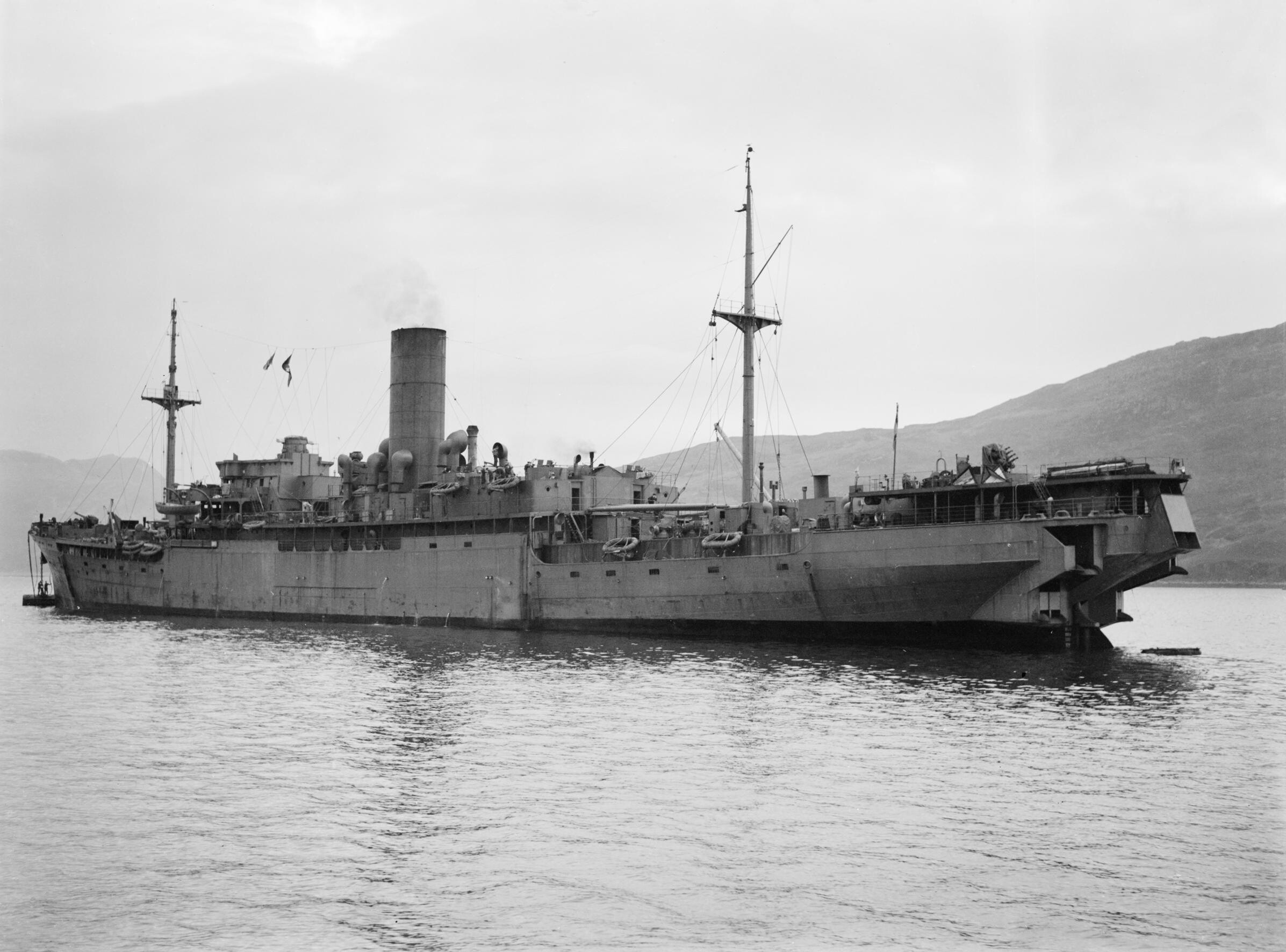
Menestheus at Kyle of Lochalsh, showing the minelaying gear at her stern

After the UK entered the Second World War the Admiralty requisitioned Menestheus. She was converted into an auxiliary minelayer, and was commissioned on 22 June 1940 with the pennant number M93. She was armed with three QF 4-inch naval gun Mk V guns, two QF 2-pounder naval guns and 12 Oerlikon 20 mm cannons.

By mid-August 1940 she had joined the 1st Minelaying Squadron at Kyle of Lochalsh (port ZA), along with four other auxiliary minesweepers, including her sister ship Agamemnon, plus an escort of Royal Navy destroyers.

Menestheus and other members of the 1st Minelaying Squadron laid mines in the Northern Barrage. In February 1941 Menestheus was damaged by a drifting British mine, and Agamemnon towed her back to Kyle of Lochalsh. The 1st Minelaying Squadron completed laying the Northern Barrage in late September 1943, and that was disbanded that October.

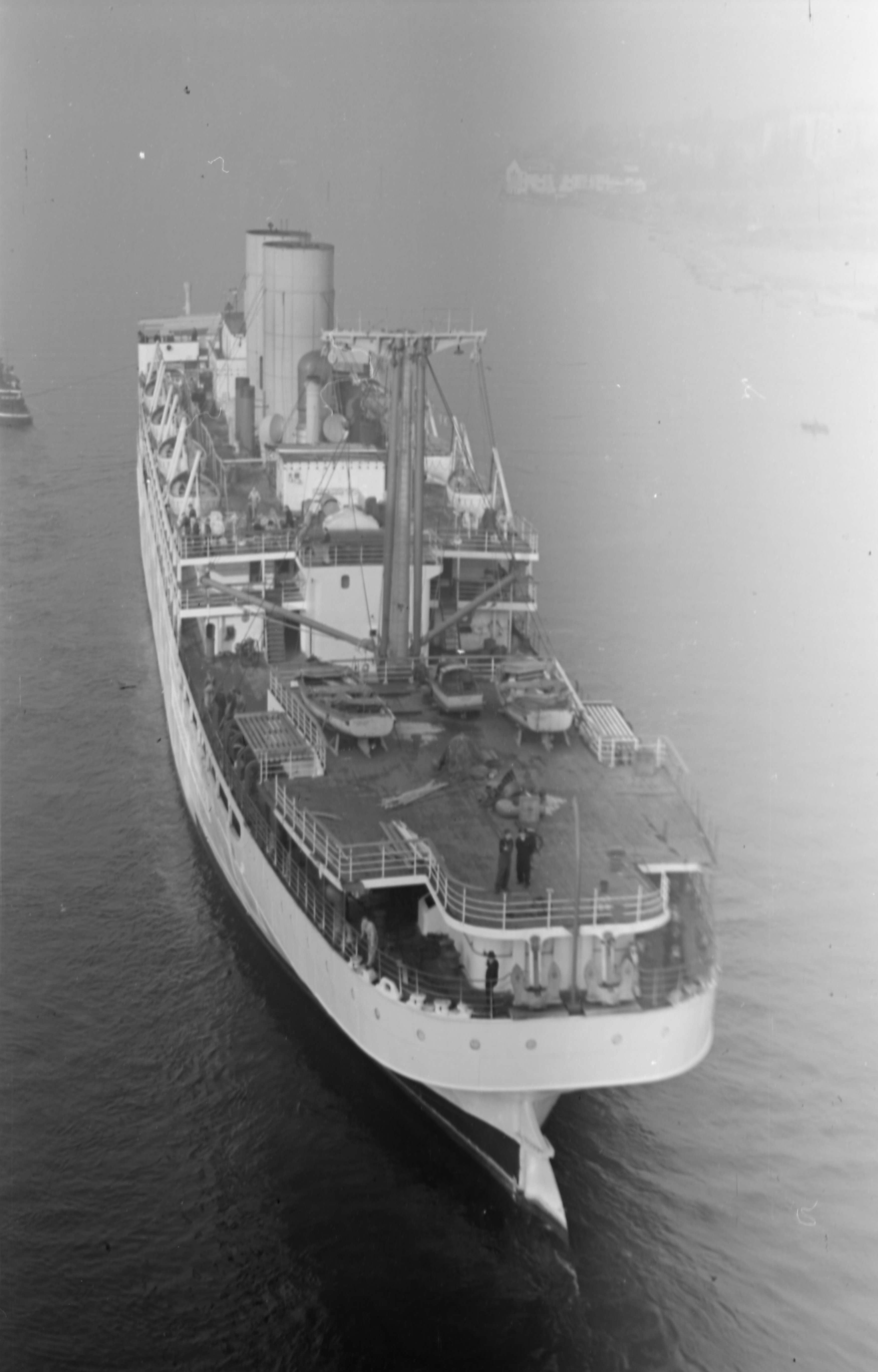
Menestheus as an amenities ship, seen from astern

In 1944 Menestheus sailed to Vancouver, British Columbia for conversion into an amenities ship for the British Pacific Fleet. Conversion included installation of a cinema and canteen, to be staffed by mercantile crews of the Royal Fleet Auxiliary, and a bar, supplied by its own shipboard brewery. The ship's superstructure was greatly enlarged for these new facilities, and a second funnel was added for the brewery. George Adlam & Sons of Bristol supplied the brewery plant. It was claimed to be "the World's only floating brewery". Menestheus' Davy Jones' Bar sold English mild ale at 9d per pint. The ship was repainted white for service in the Pacific.

== Fate ==
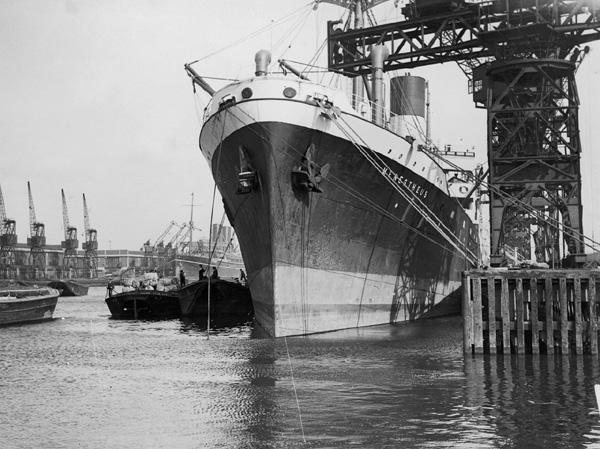
Menestheus in King George V Dock, London

In 1946 Menestheus left Yokohama to return to the UK for decommissioning. She was returned to her owners in 1948. By 1953 her navigation equipment included radar.

Early in 1953 Menestheus sailed from Philadelphia, bound for Osaka. She passed through the Panama Canal, and on 5 April she cleared Balboa, Panama.

On 16 April she was at position 25°28′N 113°21′W, off the Mexican island of Punta Eugenia in the Pacific, when an auxiliary generator in her engine room exploded, causing a fire that forced her crew to abandon her. The Pacific Far East Line ship Navajo Victory rescued her crew.

The next day, Menestheus was still burning from stem to stern, and listing by ten degrees. But her Master and Chief Officer managed to secure a tow line to her rudder. She was towed stern first to Magdalena Bay in Baja California Sur, and on 20 April she was re-boarded. The fire had completely gutted her, yet the ship's cat was found alive, and the animal made a full recovery.

The ship was towed to Long Beach, where she arrived on 5 May, and an inquiry into the explosion and fire was held. In June 1953 she arrived in Baltimore, where she was scrapped.

== Bibliography ==
- "Alphabetical List of Cargo Steamers and Motorships of 500 tons Deadweight capacity and above, with approximate Deadweight and Cubic capacities". Lloyd's Register of Shipping (PDF). Vol. I.–Steamers and Motorships Under 300 Tons, Trawlers, Tugs, Dredgers, etc. Sailing Vessels, Shipowners, etc. London: Lloyd's Register of Shipping. 1930 – via Southampton City Council.
- Haws, Duncan (1984). Blue Funnel Line. Merchant Fleets. Vol. 6. Burwash: Travel Creatours Ltd Publications. ISBN 0-946378-01-0.
- Le Fleming, HM (1961). Ships of the Blue Funnel Line. Southampton: Adlard Coles Ltd.
- Lenton, HT; Colledge, JJ (1968). British and Dominion Warships of World War II. Garden City, NY: Doubleday & Co.
- Lloyd's Register of Shipping (PDF). Vol. II.–Steamers and Motorships of 300 Tons Gross and Over. London: Lloyd's Register of Shipping. 1930 – via Southampton City Council.
- Lloyd's Register of Shipping (PDF). Vol. II.–Steamers and Motorships of 300 Tons Gross and Over. London: Lloyd's Register of Shipping. 1933 – via Southampton City Council.
- Lloyd's Register of Shipping (PDF). Vol. II.–Steamers and Motorships of 300 Tons Gross and Over. London: Lloyd's Register of Shipping. 1934 – via Southampton City Council.
- Lloyd's Register of Shipping (PDF). Vol. II.–Steamers and Motorships of 300 Tons Gross and Over. London: Lloyd's Register of Shipping. 1937 – via Southampton City Council.
- Mercantile Navy List. London. 1930 – via Crew List Index Project.
- Register Book. Vol. II, M–Z. London: Lloyd's Register of Shipping. 1953 – via Internet Archive.
- Rohwer, Jürgen (2005). Chronology of the War at Sea 1939–1945: The Naval History of World War Two (Third Revised ed.). Annapolis, MD: Naval Institute Press. ISBN 1-59114-119-2.
- Winton, John (1970). The Forgotten Fleet. London: Michael Joseph. ISBN 978-0718106430.
