= MV Deucalion =

British cargo ship that took part in two Malta convoys

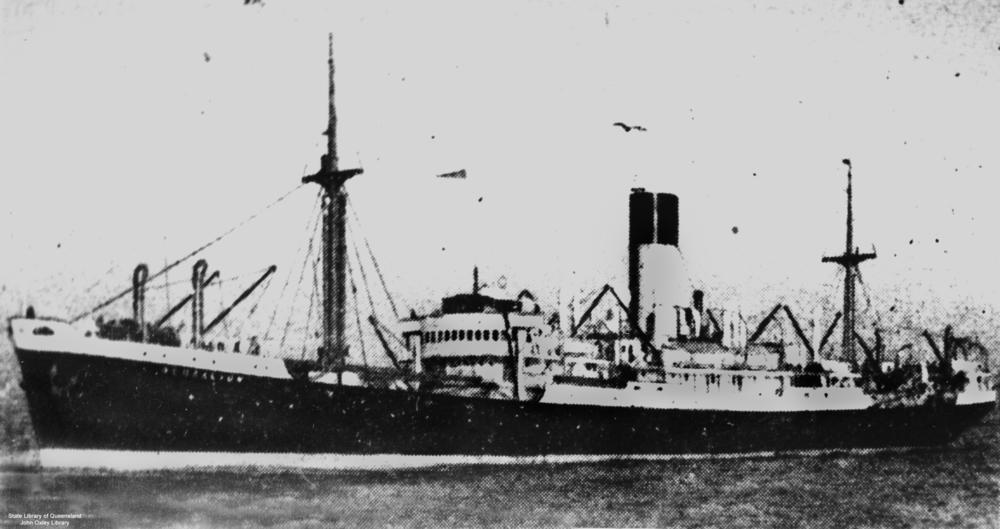
- Deucalion

History

United Kingdom
- Name: Deucalion
- Namesake: Deucalion
- Owner: Ocean SS Co Ltd
- Operator: A Holt & Co
- Port of registry: Liverpool
- Builder: Hawthorn, Leslie & Co, Hebburn
- Yard number: 568
- Launched: 29 July 1930
- Completed: December 1930
- Identification: UK official number 162329; until 1933: code letters LGQS; call sign GSWR
- Fate: Scuttled, 12 August 1942

General characteristics
- Type: refrigerated cargo ship
- Tonnage: 7,740 GRT, 4,790 NRT, 8,880 DWT
- Length: 460.0 ft (140.2 m)
- Beam: 59.4 ft (18.1 m)
- Depth: 29.3 ft (8.9 m)
- Decks: 2
- Installed power: 1,307 NHP, 8,600 bhp
- Propulsion: 2 × screws; 2 × four-stroke diesel engines
- Speed: 16 kn (30 km/h)
- Sensors & processing systems: by 1934: wireless direction finding; by 1936: echo sounding device
- Armament: DEMS
- Notes: sister ships: Agamemnon, Menestheus, Memnon, Ajax

MV Deucalion was a Blue Funnel Line refrigerated cargo ship that was built in England in 1930 and sunk in the Second World War in 1942. She survived being damaged in the Liverpool Blitz in December 1940 and took part in two Malta convoys to relieve the Siege of Malta. She survived air attacks during the first of these, Operation Substance, in July 1941 but was lost on her second Malta Convoy, Operation Pedestal, in August 1942. This was the third of five Blue Funnel ships to be named after Deucalion, a mythological king of Thessaly in Ancient Greece.

== Five sister ships ==
Between 1929 and 1931 Blue Funnel Line had a class of five cargo ships built to the same design by four UK shipyards. Deucalion was the third of the five. R. & W. Hawthorn, Leslie and Company built her in Hebburn on the River Tyne as yard number 568. She was launched on 29 July 1930 and completed that December.

The first member of the class was Agamemnon, built by Workman, Clark and Company in Belfast and launched in April 1929. The second was Menestheus, built by Caledon Shipbuilding & Engineering Company in Dundee and launched in August 1929. The others were Memnon, launched by Caledon in Dundee in October 1930 and Ajax, launched by Scotts Shipbuilding and Engineering Company in Greenock in December 1930.

== Description and identification ==
Deucalion's registered length was 460.0 ft (140.2 m), her beam was 59.4 ft (18.1 m) and her depth was 29.3 ft (8.9 m). Her tonnages were 7,740 GRT, 4,790 NRT and 8,880 DWT.

Deucalion was a twin-screw motor ship. She had two eight-cylinder Burmeister & Wain four-stroke single-acting diesel engines. Her twin engines were rated at 1,307 NHP. The engines were supercharged on the Büchi and Rateau systems, which increased their bhp from 6,600 to 8,600. This gave Deucalion a speed of 16 kn (30 km/h).

Blue Funnel Line registered Deucalion at Liverpool. Her UK official number was 162329 and until 1933 her code letters were LGQS. Her wireless telegraph call sign was GSWR. Her navigation equipment included wireless direction finding by 1934 and an echo sounding device by 1936.

== War service ==
In the Second World War, Deucalion usually sailed independently. Only a few times did she have the protection of convoys. Early in September 1940 she was in home waters. On 25 September she left Liverpool with Convoy OB 10 and then continued unescorted via Gibraltar, the Suez Canal, Colombo, Penang, Singapore, Manila, Hong Kong, Shanghai and Kobe to Yokohama, where she arrived on 22 November. On 7 December she left Yokohama for home, calling at Kobe, Singapore, Penang, Colombo, Suez and Gibraltar. She reached London on 22 January 1940 and Liverpool on 30 January.

Deucalion's next voyage began from Liverpool on 28 February 1940. She sailed via the Suez Canal, Jeddah, Aden, Penang, Singapore, Hong Kong and Shanghai to Tientsin, where she was in port from 23 to 26 April. She returned home via Singapore, Penang, Colombo, Cape Town and Freetown in Sierra Leone, reaching London on 29 June.

France had capitulated in the Armistice of 22 June 1940, making the English Channel more dangerous for Allied shipping. Deucalion returned from London to Liverpool via the North Sea and around the north of Scotland. She left Southend-on-Sea on 8 July with Convoy FN 217, which took her as far as Methil on the Firth of Forth. From there she continued with Convoy OA 182, which took her to Swansea. She returned unescorted to Liverpool, arriving on 21 July.

Deucalion's next voyage began from Liverpool on 31 July 1940. She vailed via Cape Verde, Cape Town, Penang, Singapore, Hong Kong and Shanghai to Kobe. She left Kobe on 8 October and returned via Cebu, Singapore and Cape Town, reaching Liverpool on 7 December. From 20 to 22 December 1940 there were air raids on Liverpool that came to be called the Christmas Blitz. Deucalion was in Gladstone Dock, where she was damaged on the night of 21–22 December.

Deucalion's next voyage began from Liverpool on 25 January 1941. She sailed via Cape Town, Singapore and Hong Kong to Shanghai, where she was in port from 12 to 14 April. She returned via Manila, Singapore and Cape Town, reaching Liverpool on 11 June 1941.

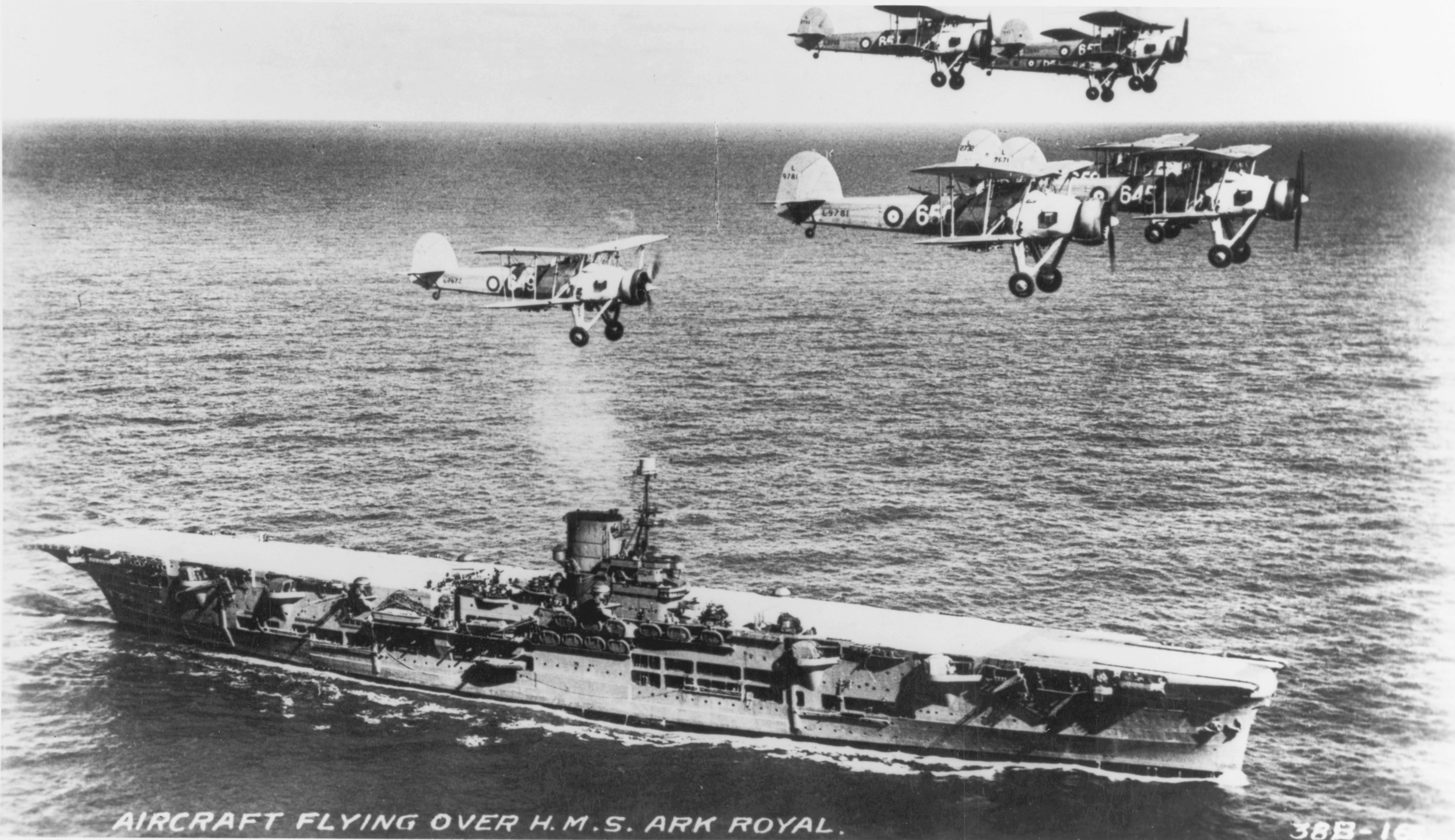
Force H's escort for Convoy GM 1 included air cover from HMS Ark Royal

On 24 June Deucalion left Liverpool for Swansea, where she was prepared to take part in Operation Substance to relieve the Siege of Malta. She left Swansea on 11 July and became one of six merchant ships in Convoy WS 9C, which reached Gibraltar on 20 July. There the six merchant ships became part of Convoy GM 1, which left that day and reached Malta on 24 July, escorted by the Royal Navy's Force H.

Operation Substance was successful but as Deucalion left Malta on 26 August, a coastal artillery battery inexplicably opened fire on her. She was undamaged but minutes later one of her paravanes detonated a mine that damaged some of her plates. Later that day, Savoia-Marchetti aircraft fired at least two torpedoes at her. By skilful manoeuvring, Deucalion evaded each torpedo, one by only 3 ft (1 m) and another scraped her side. One of the bombers was shot down. Deucalion's crew then sighted the periscope of a submarine, but an Allied destroyer and Short Sunderland arrived, enabling Duecalion to escape. Deucalion reached Gibraltar under escort on 29 August and then continued unescorted to New York, where she was in port from 15 to 27 September. She returned unescorted to Britain, arriving in the Firth of Clyde on 8 October.

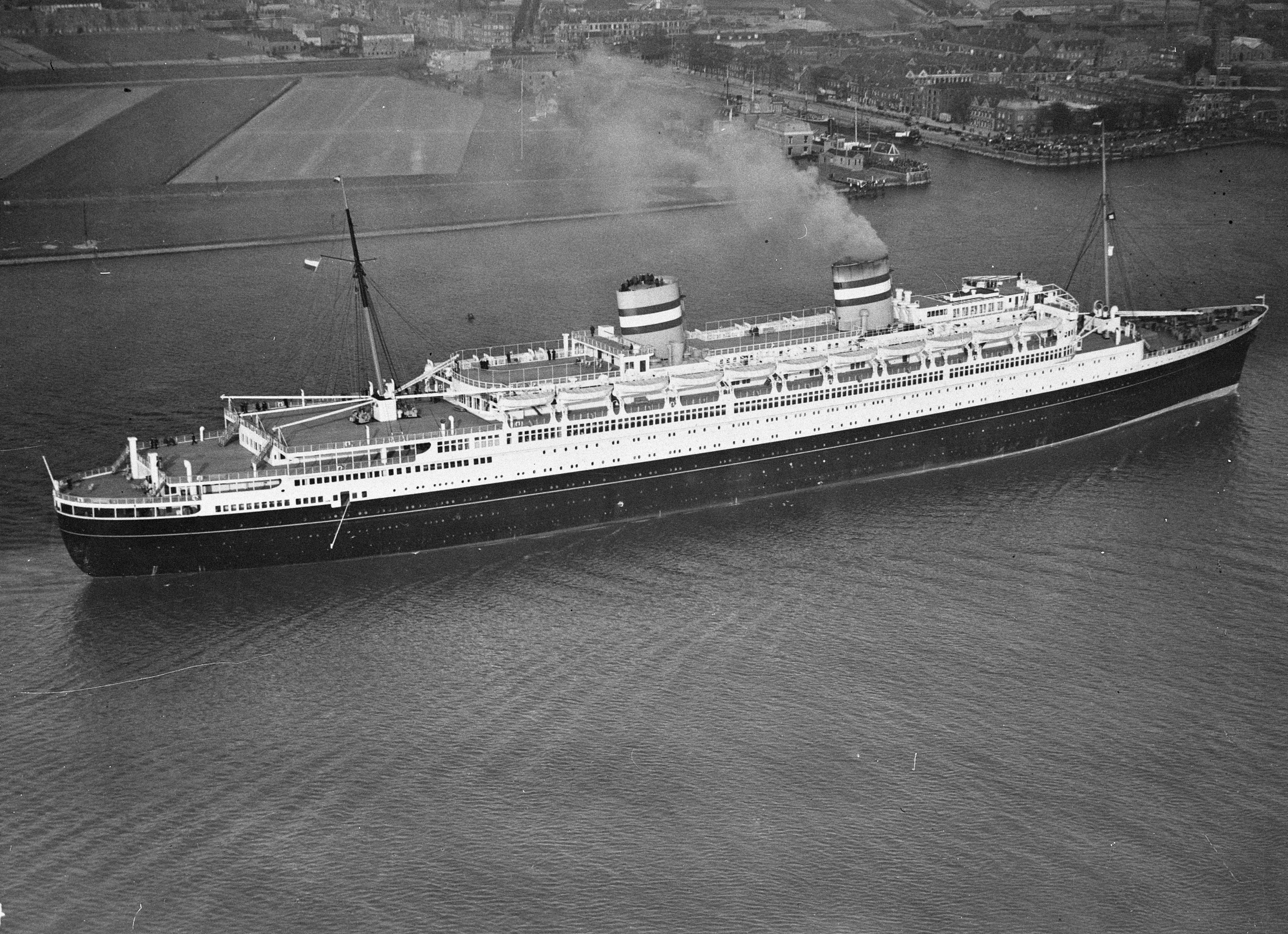
Nieuw Amsterdam, largest of the troop ships in Convoy WS 12Z

Deucalion's next voyage began from the Clyde on 12 November 1941. She sailed via Freetown and Durban to Bombay with Convoy WS 12Z, a large convoy that included several troop ships. From Bombay she continued independently via Batavia, Surabaya and Fremantle to Sydney, where she was in port from 10 March to 10 April. She returned to Britain via Port Chalmers, Bluff and the Panama Canal, reaching the Clyde on 3 July.

=== Operation Pedestal ===
In August 1942 Deucalion took part in Convoy MW 12, part of Operation Pedestal to relieve Malta. MW 12 passed Gibraltar on 10 August and came under attack from 11 August. On 12 August five Heinkel He 111 bombers attacked Deucalion. One bomb penetrated her number 5 hold aft, exploded below the waterline and lifted the ship bodily in the water. Number 1 hold forward also flooded but Deucalion kept under way toward Malta. A few hours later, three bombers made a low-level attack but their bombs missed.

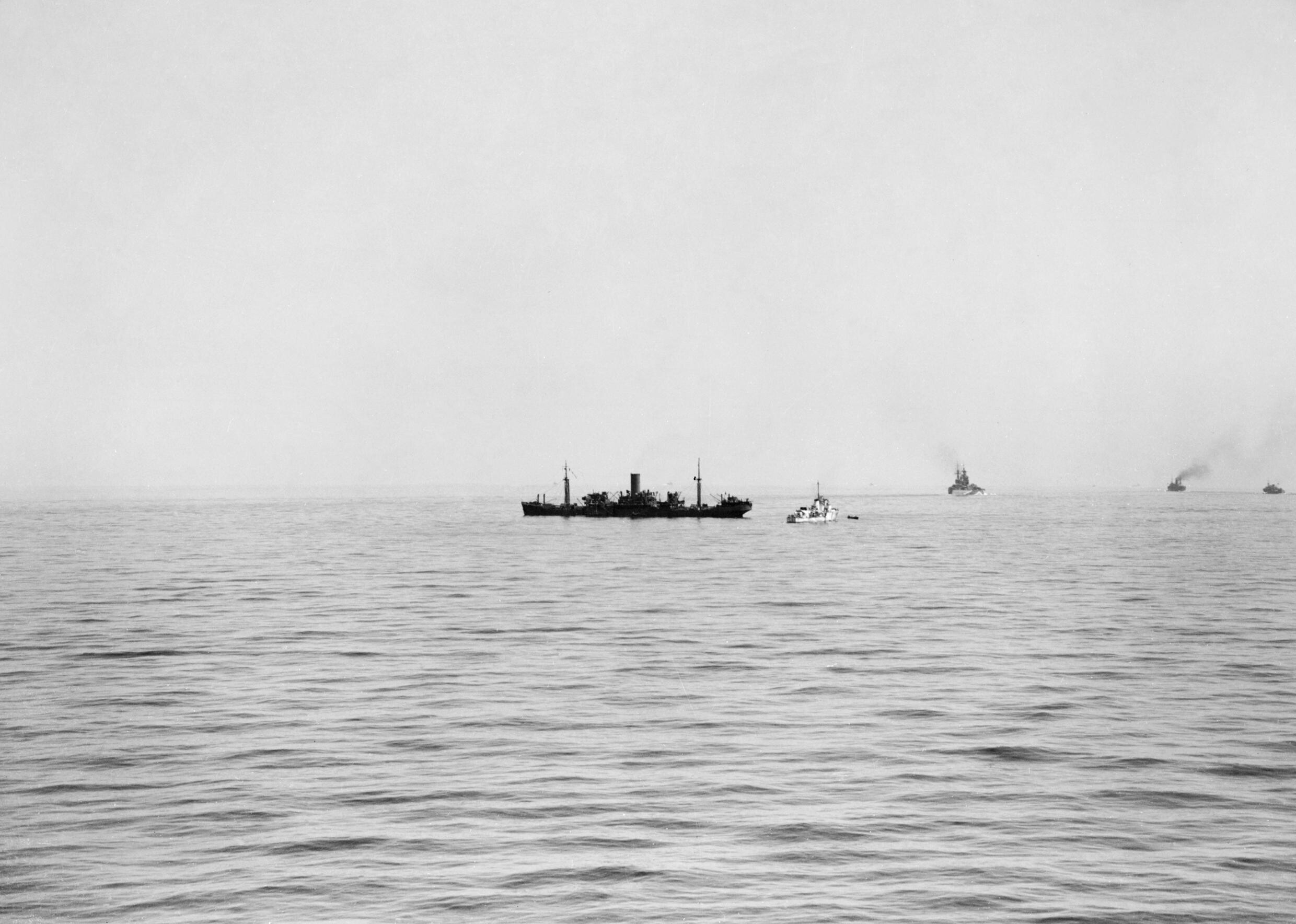
Deucalion after being damaged by a bomb. A destroyer, presumably HMS Bramham, is standing by.

An aircraft launched a torpedo at her, hitting her starboard side in number 6 hold aft. The explosion broke her starboard propeller shaft and ignited high-octane spirit that was part of her cargo. A sheet of flame rose twice the height of her masthead, preventing crew members at her stern from reaching their boat stations. Crew members amidships launched life rafts for those crew members who were trapped astern. One badly-injured DEMS gunner had been trapped by a falling raft but two apprentices freed him and lowered him into the water, where one of the apprentices, John Gregson, towed him a distance of about 600 yards to a rescuing destroyer. Despite the severity of the attack, only one member of Deucalion's crew was killed. The destroyer HMS Bramham stood by and rescued survivors. Despite being seriously damaged Deucalion did not immediately sink and was scuttled by Bramham.

=== Honours ===
On 10 November 1942 Deucalion's Master, Captain Ramsay Brown, was awarded the Distinguished Service Cross for his actions aboard Deucalion, and the King's Commendation for his actions when I-7 sank a previous command of his, Glenshiel, on 2 April 1942. Lloyd's of London awarded Lloyd's War Medal for Bravery at Sea to Captain Brown, apprentice John Gregson, and a Captain Percival Pycraft, OBE, DSC, RNR, who was also aboard Deucalion.

On 6 December 1942, Brown was a passenger on the Elder, Dempster ship Henry Stanley when U-103 sank her. The passengers and crew abandoned ship in her four lifeboats, but none of the boats or its occupants was ever found.

On 6 February 1943, Gregson was awarded the Albert Medal for Lifesaving for his part in freeing the trapped gunner and towing him to safety.

== Bibliography ==
- "Alphabetical List of Cargo Steamers and Motorships of 500 tons Deadweight capacity and above, with approximate Deadweight and Cubic capacities". Lloyd's Register of Shipping (PDF). Vol. I.–Steamers and Motorships Under 300 Tons, Trawlers, Tugs, Dredgers, etc. Sailing Vessels, Shipowners, etc. London: Lloyd's Register of Shipping. 1931 – via Southampton City Council.
- Crabb, Brian James (2014). Operation Pedestal: The story of Convoy WS21S in August 1942. England: Shaun Tyas. ISBN 978-1-907730-19-1.
- Haws, Duncan (1984). Blue Funnel Line. Merchant Fleets. Vol. 6. Burwash: Travel Creatours Ltd Publications. ISBN 0-946378-01-0.
- Le Fleming, HM (1961). Ships of the Blue Funnel Line. Southampton: Adlard Coles Ltd. OCLC 776899828.
- Lloyd's Register of Shipping (PDF). Vol. II.–Steamers and Motorships of 300 Tons Gross and Over. London: Lloyd's Register of Shipping. 1931 – via Southampton City Council.
- Lloyd's Register of Shipping (PDF). Vol. II.–Steamers and Motorships of 300 Tons Gross and Over. London: Lloyd's Register of Shipping. 1934 – via Southampton City Council.
- Lloyd's Register of Shipping (PDF). Vol. II.–Steamers and Motorships of 300 Tons Gross and Over. London: Lloyd's Register of Shipping. 1936 – via Southampton City Council.
- Mercantile Navy List. London. 1931 – via Crew List Index Project.
