= HMS Agamemnon (M10) =

Cargo ship that was converted into an auxiliary minelayer

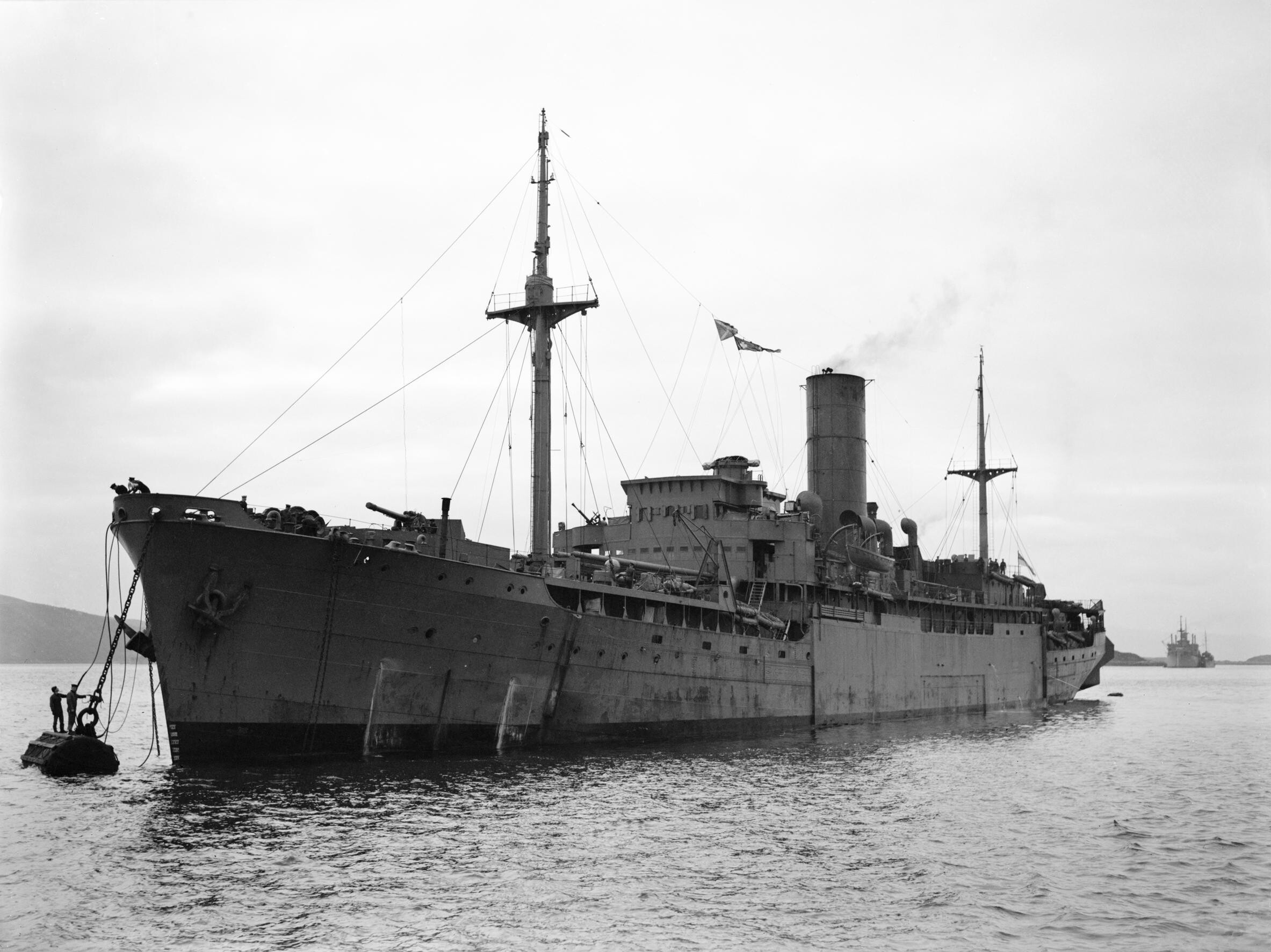
- HMS Agamemnon moored at Kyle of Lochalsh

History

United Kingdom
- Name: Agamemnon
- Namesake: Agamemnon
- Owner: Ocean SS Co Ltd
- Operator: 1929: A Holt & Co; 1940: (United Kingdom) Royal Navy; 1946: A Holt & Co
- Port of registry: (United Kingdom) Liverpool
- Builder: Workman, Clark & Co, Belfast
- Yard number: 503
- Launched: 25 April 1929
- Completed: September 1929
- Acquired: requisitioned, 30 December 1939
- Commissioned: into Royal Navy, 1940
- Decommissioned: returned to owners, 1946
- Identification: UK official number 161124; until 1933: code letters LFCN; from 1930: call sign GNYL; 1940: pennant number M10
- Fate: scrapped in 1963

General characteristics
- Type: 1929: refrigerated cargo ship; 1940: auxiliary minelayer; 1943: amenities ship
- Tonnage: 7,877 GRT, 4,830 NRT, 9,110 DWT
- Length: 459.8 ft (140.1 m)
- Beam: 59.4 ft (18.1 m)
- Depth: 29.3 ft (8.9 m)
- Decks: 2
- Installed power: 1,300 NHP, 8,600 bhp
- Propulsion: 2 × screws; 2 × four-stroke diesel engines
- Speed: 16 knots (30 km/h)
- Sensors & processing systems: wireless direction finding; by 1936: echo sounding device; by 1959: radar
- Armament: 3 × 4-inch guns; 2 × 2-pounder guns; 4 × Oerlikon 20 mm cannon; 4 × 0.5-inch machine guns; 542 × mines
- Notes: sister ships: Menestheus, Deucalion, Memnon, Ajax

HMS Agamemnon was originally the Blue Funnel Line refrigerated cargo ship Agamemnon. She was built in 1929, traded between the United Kingdom and the Far East, and was scrapped in 1963. During the Second World War she was converted into an auxiliary minelayer in 1940, and then into an amenities ship in 1943.

She was the third of four Blue Funnel Line ships to be named after Agamemnon, the king of Mycenae during the Trojan War. She was also the fifth of six Royal Navy ships to be called Agamemnon.

== Five sister ships ==
Between 1929 and 1931 Blue Funnel Line had a class of five cargo ships built to the same design by four different UK shipyards. Agamemnon was the first of the five. Workman, Clark and Company built her in Belfast as yard number 503. She was launched on 25 April 1929, and completed that September.

Caledon Shipbuilding & Engineering Company built Menestheus in Dundee, launching her in August 1929 and completing her that September. R. & W. Hawthorn, Leslie and Company built Deucalion in Hebburn, launching her in July 1930 and completing her that December. Caledon in Dundee also built Memnon, launching her on 21 October 1930 and completing her in January 1931. Scotts Shipbuilding and Engineering Company built Ajax at Greenock, launching her in December 1930 and completing her in April 1931.

== Agamemnon as built ==
Agamemnon's registered length was 459.8 ft (140.1 m), her beam was 59.4 ft (18.1 m) and her depth was 29.3 ft (8.9 m). Her tonnages were 7,877 GRT, 4,830 NRT and 9,110 DWT.

Agamemnon was a twin-screw motor ship. She had two eight-cylinder Burmeister & Wain four-stroke single-acting diesel engines. Between them, her twin engines were rated at 1,300 NHP. The engines were supercharged on the Büchi and Rateau systems, which increased their bhp from 6,600 to 8,600. This gave Agamemnon a speed of 16 knots (30 km/h).

Blue Funnel Line registered Agamemnon at Liverpool. Her UK official number was 161124, and until 1933 her code letters were LFCN. By 1930 she also had the wireless telegraph call sign GNYL.

Agamemnon's navigation equipment included wireless direction finding. By 1936 she was equipped also with an echo sounding device.

== Naval service ==
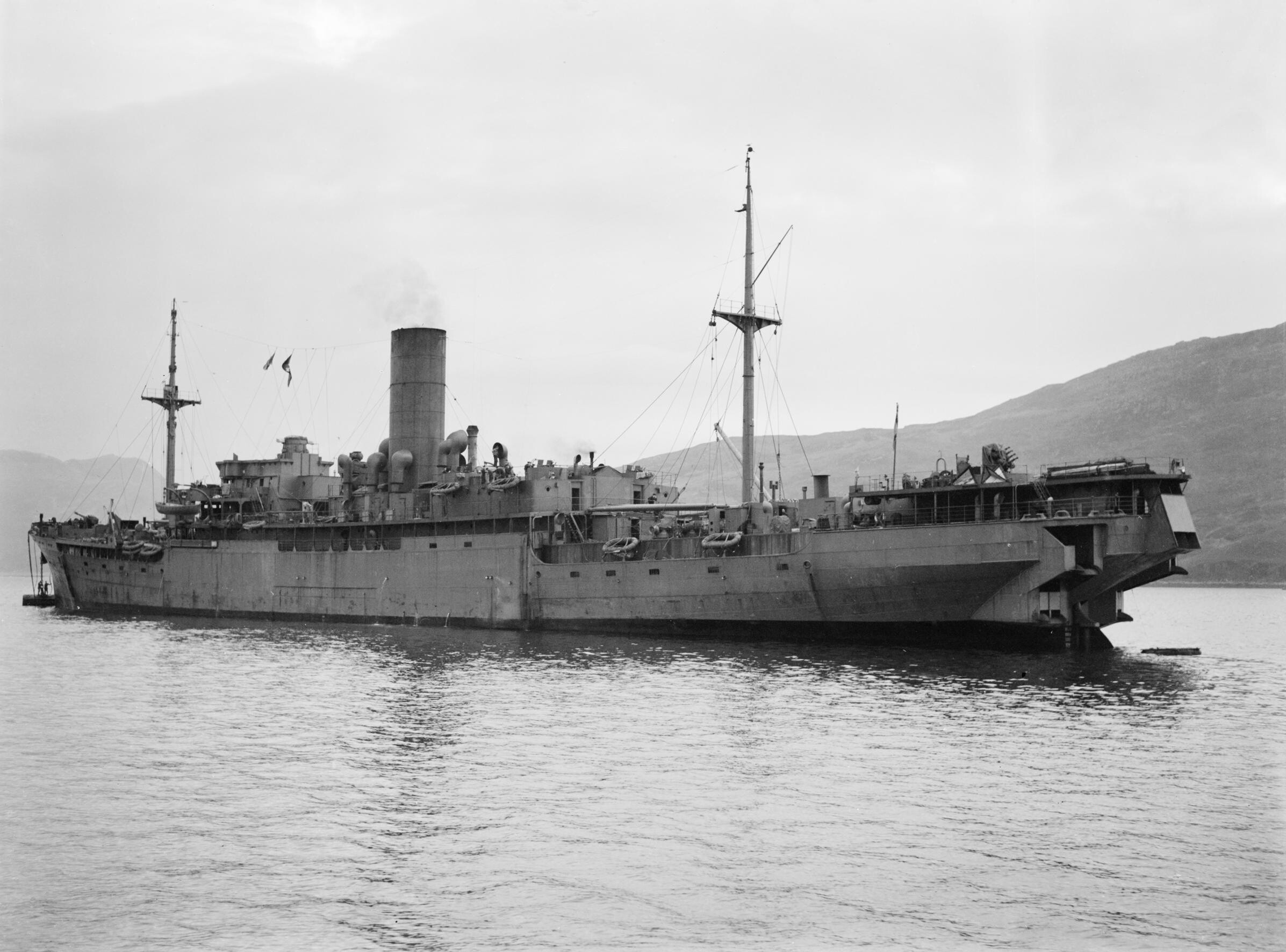
Agamemnon's sister ship Menestheus at Kyle of Lochalsh, showing the minelaying gear at her stern

On 30 December 1939 the Admiralty requisitioned Agamemnon. She was converted into an auxiliary minelayer, and was commissioned in August or September 1940 with the pennant number M10. She was armed with three QF 4-inch naval gun Mk V, two QF 2-pounder naval guns, four Oerlikon 20 mm cannon and four Vickers .50 machine guns.

On 18 October 1940 she joined the 1st Minelaying Squadron at Kyle of Lochalsh (port ZA), along with four other auxiliary minesweepers, including her sister ship Menestheus, plus an escort of Royal Navy destroyers. From Mid-October 1940, Agamemnon and other members of the 1st Minelaying Squadron laid mines in the Northern Barrage. In February 1941 Menestheus was damaged by a drifting British mine, and Agamemnon towed her back to Kyle of Lochalsh. From November 1942 until March 1943 she was refitted at a commercial shipyard on the River Thames. The 1st Minelaying Squadron completed laying the Northern Barrage in late September 1943, and that was disbanded that October. In November 1944 Agamemnon sailed to Vancouver, British Columbia for conversion into an amenities ship for the British Pacific Fleet. Conversion included installation of a cinema and canteen, to be staffed by mercantile crews of the Royal Fleet Auxiliary. When Japan surrendered in August 1945 the conversion was still incomplete, so the work was abandoned.

== Fate ==
Most sources assert that the Admiralty returned Agamemnon to her owners in 1946 but one suggests that it was in April 1947. Either way, she resumed Blue Funnel Line merchant service. By 1952 her navigation equipment included a gyrocompass and by 1959 it included radar. Agamemnon arrived in Hong Kong on 22 March 1963 to be scrapped.

== Bibliography ==
- "Alphabetical List of Cargo Steamers and Motorships of 500 tons Deadweight capacity and above, with approximate Deadweight and Cubic capacities". Lloyd's Register of Shipping (PDF). Vol. I.–Steamers and Motorships Under 300 Tons, Trawlers, Tugs, Dredgers, etc. Sailing Vessels, Shipowners, etc. London: Lloyd's Register of Shipping. 1930 – via Southampton City Council.
- Haws, Duncan (1984). Blue Funnel Line. Merchant Fleets. Vol. 6. Burwash: Travel Creatours Ltd Publications. ISBN 0-946378-01-0.
- Le Fleming, HM (1961). Ships of the Blue Funnel Line. Southampton: Adlard Coles Ltd.
- Lenton, HT; Colledge, JJ (1968). British and Dominion Warships of World War II. Garden City, NY: Doubleday & Co.
- Lloyd's Register of Shipping (PDF). Vol. II.–Steamers and Motorships of 300 Tons Gross and Over. London: Lloyd's Register of Shipping. 1930 – via Southampton City Council.
- Lloyd's Register of Shipping (PDF). Vol. II.–Steamers and Motorships of 300 Tons Gross and Over. London: Lloyd's Register of Shipping. 1934 – via Southampton City Council.
- Lloyd's Register of Shipping (PDF). Vol. II.–Steamers and Motorships Over 300 Tons. London: Lloyd's Register of Shipping. 1936 – via Southampton City Council.
- Mercantile Navy List. London. 1930 – via Crew List Index Project.
- Register Book. Vol. I, A–L. London: Lloyd's Register of Shipping. 1952 – via Internet Archive.
- Register Book. Vol. I Register of Ships. London: Lloyd's Register of Shipping. 1959 – via Internet Archive.
- Rohwer, Jürgen (2005). Chronology of the War at Sea 1939–1945: The Naval History of World War Two (Third Revised ed.). Annapolis, MD: Naval Institute Press. ISBN 1-59114-119-2.
