= John Gregson (sailor) =

Recipient of the George Cross

John Sedgwick Gregson GC
- Born: 4 January 1924; Bombay, British India (now Mumbai, India)
- Died: 25 December 2016 (aged 92); Tauranga, New Zealand
- Known for: Actions during the Second World War
- Awards: George Cross

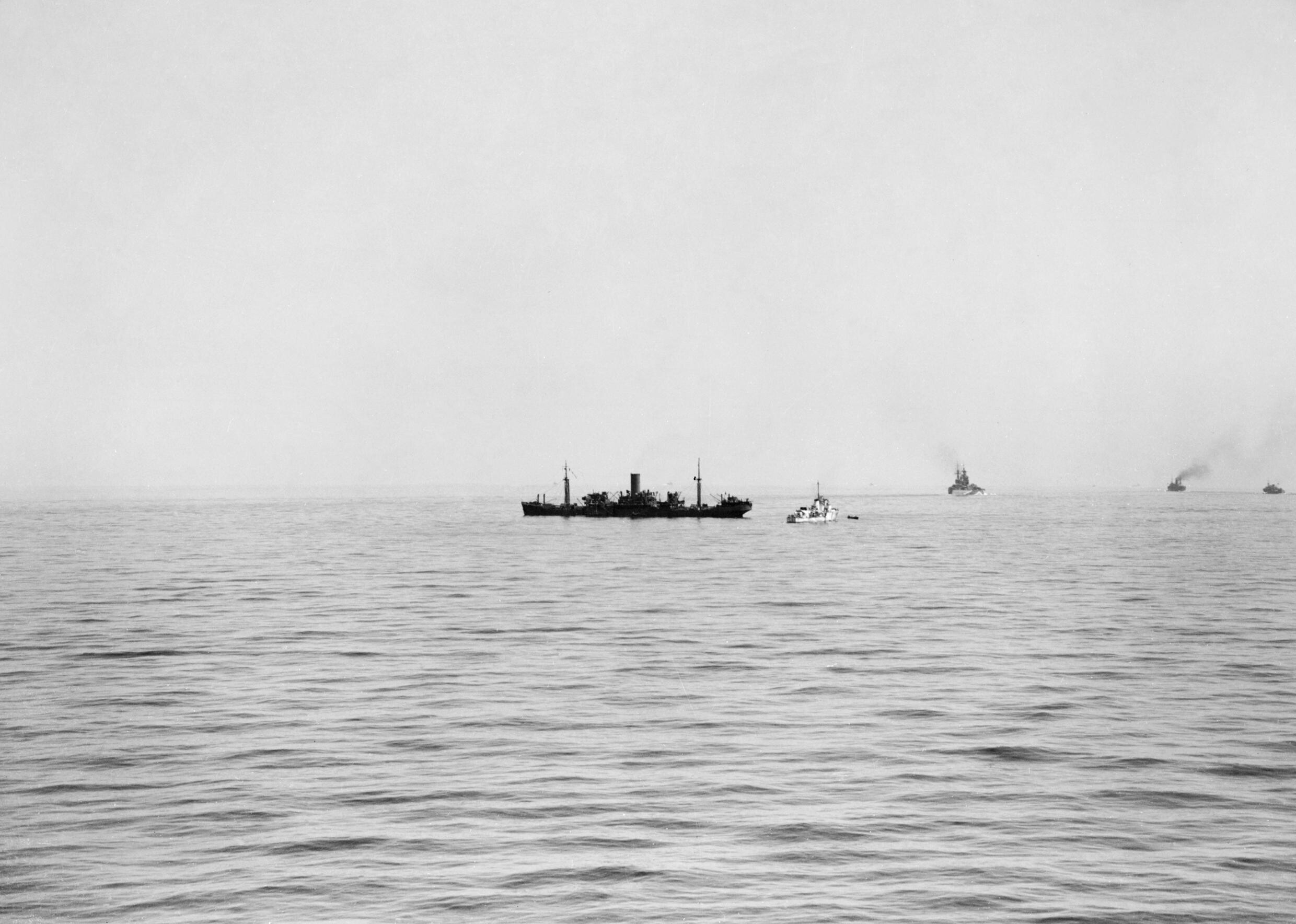
A British destroyer, possibly HMS Bramham, standing by Deucalion after the latter had been bombed

John Sedgwick Gregson, GC (4 January 1924 – 25 December 2016) was an apprentice in the British Merchant Navy who was awarded the Albert Medal during the Second World War. This was later replaced with the George Cross.

== Second World War ==
Gregson served aboard Deucalion as part of Operation Pedestal, a British operation to carry supplies to the island of Malta in August 1942. On the morning of 12 August, Deucalion and other members of the convoy came under attack off the Tunisian coast.

An account of the Deucalion attack, and notice of Gregson's award of the Albert Medal was published in The London Gazette on 2 February 1943, reading:

The KING has been graciously pleased to make the following award:-

The Albert Medal.

John Sedgwick Gregson, Apprentice.

The ship was set on fire by the explosion of a torpedo during an attack by enemy aircraft. The flames spread rapidly and almost immediately orders were given to abandon ship. One of the ship's gunners, however, was pinned under a raft. Apprentice Gregson immediately went to his assistance and, with help freed him. The gunner had sustained severe injuries and, as it was impossible to get him into a boat or on to a raft, he was dropped overboard. Gregson dived into the sea after him, and, in the darkness, towed his helpless shipmate to a ship which picked them up, a distance of about 600 yards.

But for Apprentice Gregson's gallant and determined action, undertaken with complete disregard of his personal safety, the injured man would have had little chance of survival.

== Later life ==
Gregson moved to New Zealand in 1952, where he worked on the coastal tanker fleet, and later became a harbour pilot with the Port of Tauranga. He died on Christmas Day 2016, aged 92.
