= Ranger-class tanker =

Class of six fleet support tankers of the Royal Fleet Auxiliary

- RFA Black Ranger

Class overview
- Name: Ranger class
- Builders: Harland & Wolff; Caledon Shipbuilding & Engineering Company
- Operators: Royal Fleet Auxiliary
- Succeeded by: Wave class
- Built: 1940–1941
- In commission: 1941–1973
- Completed: 6

General characteristics
- Type: Fleet support tanker
- Displacement: 6,700 long tons (6,808 t) full load
- Length: 365 ft 10 in (111.51 m)
- Beam: 47 ft (14 m)
- Draught: 20 ft 2 in (6.15 m)
- Propulsion: 1 × 6-cylinder B&W diesel, 3,500 shp (2,600 kW) or 1 × 4-cylinder Doxford diesel, 2,800 shp (2,100 kW); 1 shaft
- Speed: 13 knots (15 mph; 24 km/h)
- Range: 6,000 nmi (11,000 km) at 13 kn (15 mph; 24 km/h)
- Complement: 40

The Ranger-class tanker was a series of six fleet support tankers built for the Royal Fleet Auxiliary (RFA), the naval auxiliary fleet of the United Kingdom.

- RFA Black Ranger (A163), built by Harland & Wolff
- RFA Blue Ranger (A157), built by Harland and Wolff
- RFA Brown Ranger (A169), built by Harland and Wolff
- RFA Gold Ranger (A130), built by Caledon Shipbuilding & Engineering Company
- RFA Green Ranger (A152), built by Caledon Shipbuilding & Engineering Company
- RFA Gray Ranger, built by Caledon Shipbuilding & Engineering Company

== See also ==
- List of replenishment ships of the Royal Fleet Auxiliary
