= Lord Murray =

Lord Murray or Baron Murray may refer to:

== People ==
=== Judicial titles ===
- John Murray, Lord Murray (1778–1859), Scottish judge
- Charles Murray, Lord Murray (1866–1936), Scottish Tory politician, lawyer and judge
- David King Murray, Lord Birnam (1884–1955), Scottish advocate and judge, known from 1938 to 1941 as Lord Murray
- Ronald King Murray, Lord Murray (1922-2016), Scottish Labour Member of Parliament 1970–79, and judge

=== Life peers ===
- Keith Murray, Baron Murray of Newhaven KCB (1903–1993), British academic and life peer, Rector of Lincoln College, Oxford
- Len Murray, Baron Murray of Epping Forest (1922–2004), British trade union leader, and Labour Party life peer
- Albert Murray, Baron Murray of Gravesend (1930–1980), British Labour Party politician, MP 1964–70, life peer 1976–80
- Simon Murray, Baron Murray of Blidworth (born 1974), British Conservative Party politician

=== Hereditary peers and courtesy titles ===
- Lord George Murray (bishop) (1761–1803), Anglican Bishop of Saint David's 1801–03, developer of Britain's first optical telegraph
- Lord Henry Murray (1767–1805), British soldier and administrator who served as the fourth Lieutenant Governor of the Isle of Man
- Alexander Murray, 1st Baron Murray of Elibank (1870–1920), Scottish Liberal politician

== Ships ==
- SS Baron Murray, a cargo ship in service with H Hogarth & Sons, Glasgow between 1946 and 1959
