= Liberty cuffs =

Personal decorations worn inside the cuffs of military uniforms

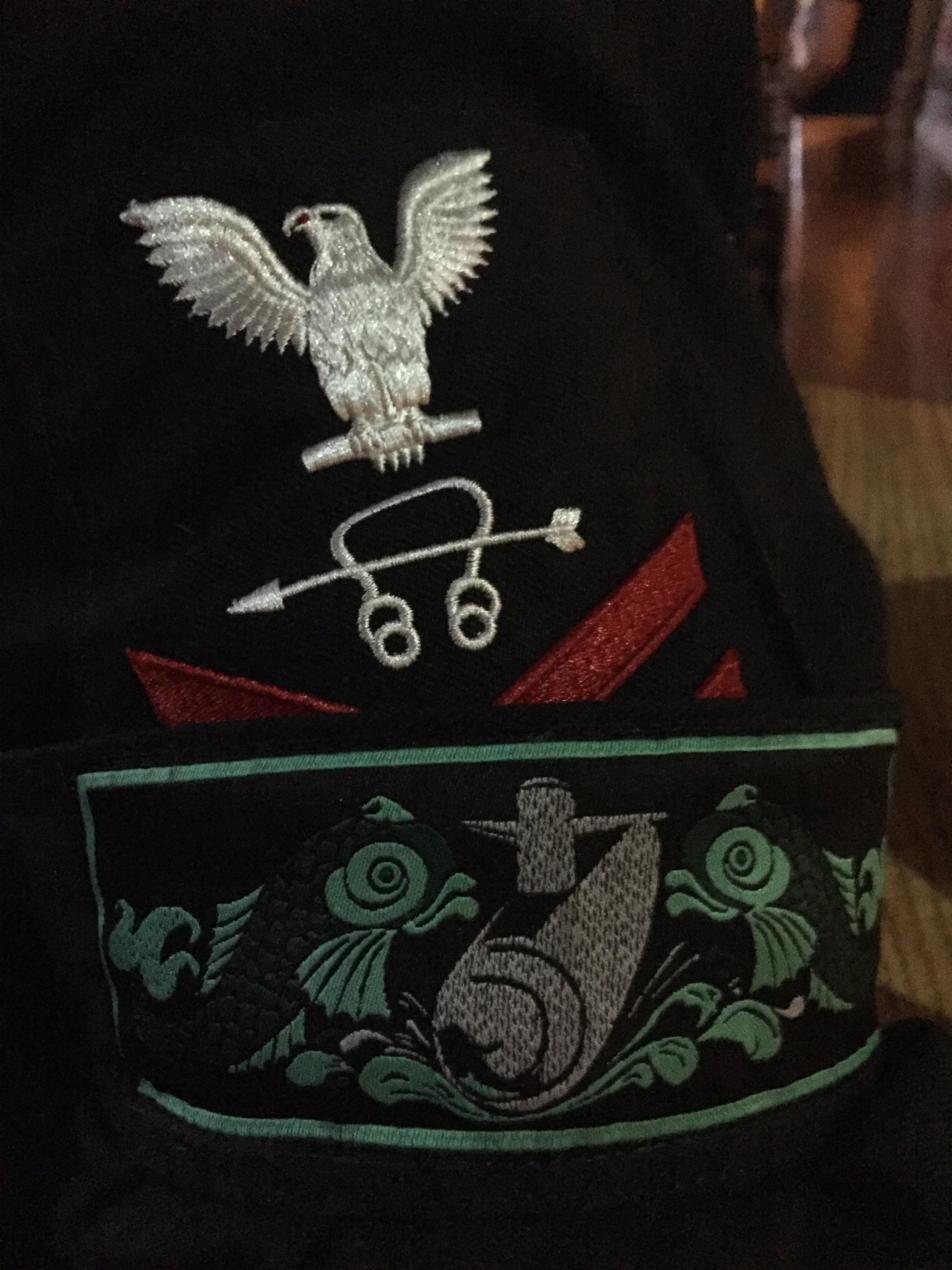
Liberty cuff of US Navy PO on port call in Baltimore, October 2018

Liberty cuffs are a form of unauthorized personal decoration applied to the inside of the cuffs of military uniforms, which became popular in the United States Navy in the early 1900s and were imitated by other U.S. military branches starting around World War I. Liberty cuffs were embroidered patches sewn on the inside cuffs of sailors’ uniform shirts or jackets; the patches could only be seen when the cuffs were rolled up, which the sailor would do while on "liberty" or shore leave away from his ship.

Decorative stitching on Navy uniform cuffs was banned in 1910, forcing sailors to switch to this covert form of embroidered decoration. The cuffs were noted as popular prior to World War II in the United States Asiatic Fleet, including dragons and other popular regional symbols. Popular World War II imagery included dragons, mermaids, as well as dolphins for those working on submarines and birds for those working with aircraft.
