= Amenities ship =

Naval vessel outfitted with recreational facilities

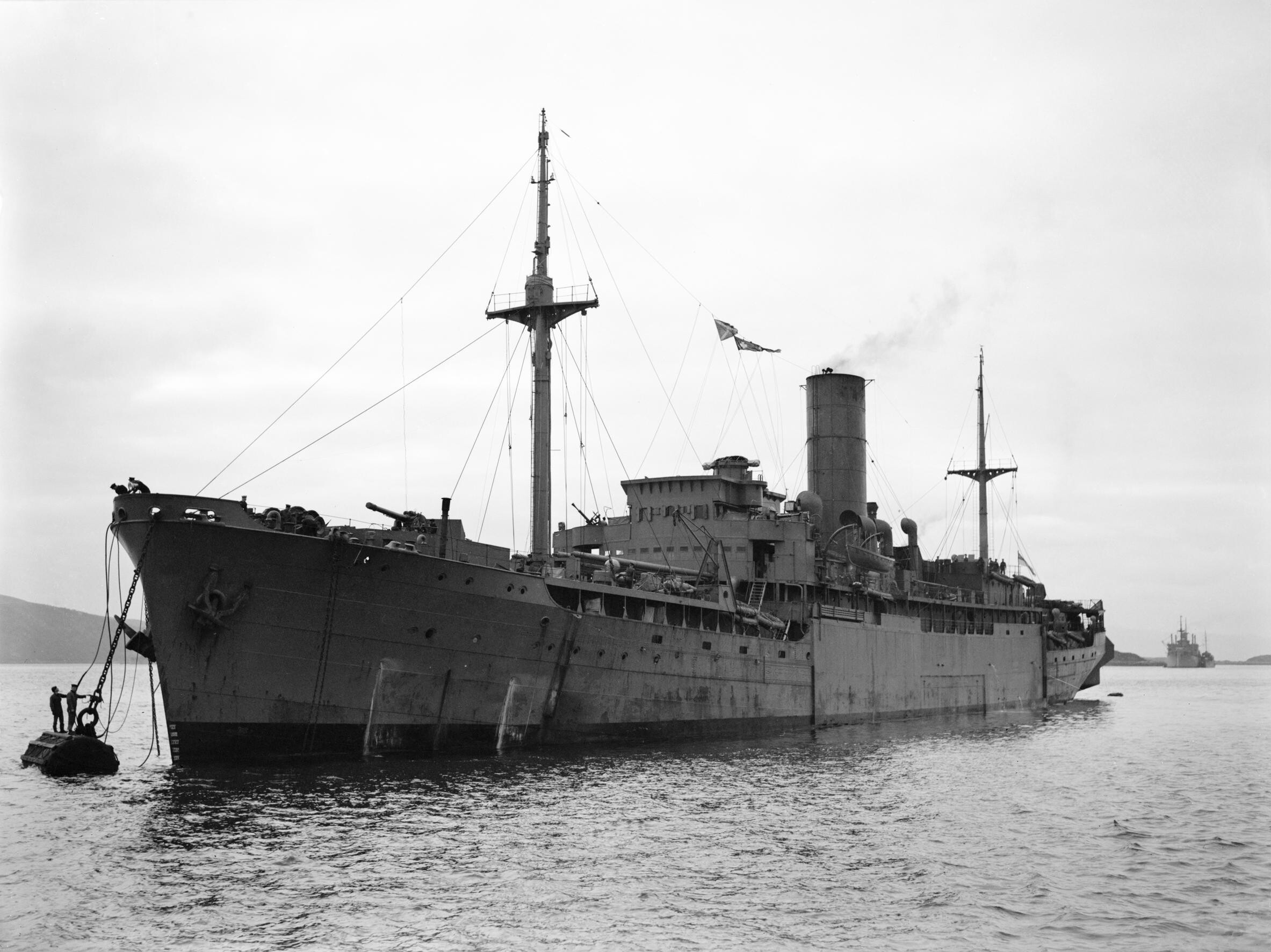
The auxiliary minelayer HMS Agamemnon moored at a minelaying base in Kyle of Lochalsh

An amenities ship was a naval vessel outfitted with recreational facilities as part of a mobile naval base. Amenities ships provided cinemas and canteens staffed by mercantile crews of the Royal Fleet Auxiliary. These ships were intended to provide a place where British Pacific Fleet personnel could relax between operations.

== Background ==
As the Royal Navy prepared for operations in the Pacific Ocean during the final stage of World War II, it was recognised that warships would be operating far from base facilities. Mobile naval base facilities were prepared for remote Pacific harbours without shore facilities. Each mobile base would include repair ships and depot ships to provide maintenance and personnel services for flotillas of small ships like destroyers, submarines, minesweepers, and landing craft. Base ships were outfitted with offices to provide administrative and communications services for efficient refuelling and resupply of ships using the base, and accommodation ships provided living quarters for base staff and personnel awaiting transfer.

== Description ==
Amenities ships were expected to provide an alternative to shore leave in remote locations without commercial recreation facilities. Two former minelayers, HMS Agamemnon and Menestheus, were converted to amenities ships after the Northern Barrage was completed. These 7,500-ton ships were former Blue Funnel Liners launched in 1929 and initially converted to auxiliary minelayers. They underwent further conversion at Vancouver in 1944 including installation of a brewery to make beer for shipboard consumption. These ships had been painted grey for service as North Atlantic minelayers, but were repainted white for service in the western Pacific. The war ended before they were used in their intended role as amenities ships.
