= HMS Agamemnon =

Five ships and one submarine of the Royal Navy have been named HMS Agamemnon, after the legendary Greek king Agamemnon.

- HMS Agamemnon (1781) was a 64-gun third-rate launched in 1781. She took part in the Battle of Trafalgar in 1805 and was wrecked in 1809.
- HMS Agamemnon (1852) was a 91-gun screw-propelled second-rate launched in 1852 and sold in 1870.
- HMS Agamemnon (1879) was an Ajax-class battleship launched in 1879 and broken up in 1903.
- HMS Agamemnon (1906) was a Lord Nelson-class battleship launched in 1906, used as a target ship from 1920 and sold in 1927.
- HMS Agamemnon (M10) was a civilian cargo ship requisitioned as an auxiliary minelayer for the Northern Barrage in 1940 and returned in 1946.
- HMS Agamemnon (S124) is an Astute-class nuclear submarine commissioned in 2025.

== Battle honours ==
- Ushant 1781
- The Saints 1782
- Genoa 1795
- Copenhagen 1801
- Trafalgar 1805
- San Domingo 1806
- Crimea 1854–55
- Dardanelles 1915–16

== See also ==
- SS Agamemnon (1865), an early long-distance merchant steamship with a fuel efficient compound engine.
