= RFA Gold Ranger =

1941 Ranger-class fleet support tanker of the Royal Fleet Auxiliary

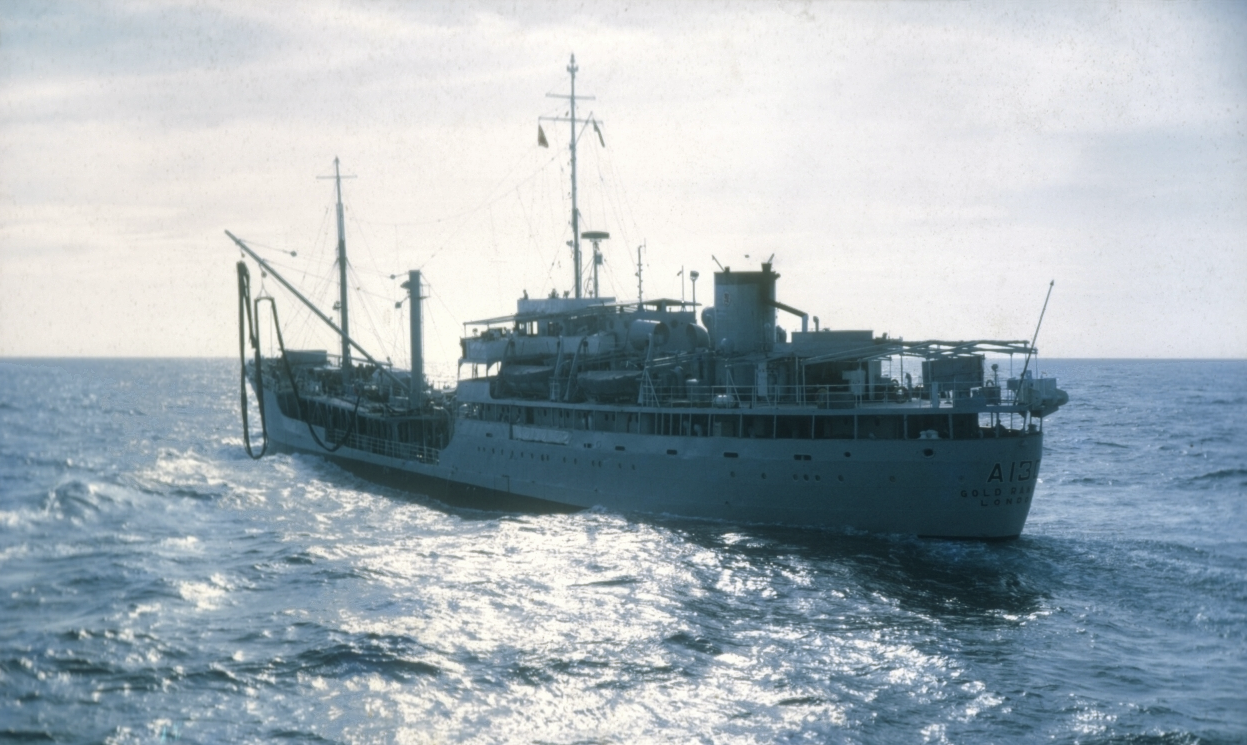

History

United Kingdom
- Name: Gold Ranger
- Ordered: 28 August 1939
- Builder: Caledon Shipbuilding Co Ltd
- Yard number: 389
- Laid down: 14 May 1940
- Launched: 12 March 1941
- Decommissioned: December 1972; Laid up at Singapore
- In service: 4 July 1941
- Out of service: July 1973
- Identification: IMO number: 5132937; Pennant number: X30 (WWII) A130 (post 1947)
- Fate: Sold commercially with name unchanged, July 1973; Scrapped at Hong Kong, March 1977

General characteristics
- Class & type: Ranger-class fleet support tanker
- Tonnage: 3,313 GRT; 1,506 NRT
- Displacement: 6,700 long tons (6,808 t) full load
- Length: 365 ft 4 in (111.35 m)
- Beam: 47 ft (14 m)
- Draught: 22 ft 2 in (6.76 m)
- Propulsion: 1 × 4-cylinder Doxford diesel engine; 2,800 shp (2,100 kW); 1 shaft
- Speed: 13 knots (15 mph; 24 km/h)
- Range: 6,000 nmi (11,000 km) at 14.5 kn (16.7 mph; 26.9 km/h)
- Complement: 40

RFA Gold Ranger (A130) was a Ranger-class fleet support tanker of the Royal Fleet Auxiliary which first served in World War II.

In December, 1949, she supported Operation Corkscrew by providing aviation fuel at Deception Island for aircraft which helped relieve men of the Falkland Islands Dependencies Survey at Base E on Stonington Island. She later served in the Korean War, and in support of the atomic tests at Mauro Atoll. She was later employed as a support ship for minesweepers during the Indonesian Confrontation.

In 1972 she brought the expedition members of the Joint Services Egmont Islands Expedition (JSEI) from Gan, Addu Atoll to the Egmont Atoll. Led by Sqn Leader "Dickie" Bird RAF, it was the first scuba diving expedition in the Chagos Archipelago. Following its success, a second expedition was undertaken to Danger Island the following year.
