= SS Navajo Victory =

Victory ship of the United States

- Typical Victory Ship.

History

United States
- Name: Navajo Victory
- Namesake: Navajo City, New Mexico and Navajo, Arizona
- Owner: War Shipping Administration
- Operator: Luckenbach Line Company 1944, American Mail Line 1966
- Builder: California Shipbuilding Company, Los Angeles
- Laid down: March 5, 1944
- Launched: May 2, 1944
- Completed: June 30, 1944
- Identification: IMO number: 5247940
- Fate: Scrapped in Kaohsiung, Taiwan, 1985

General characteristics
- Class & type: VC2-S-AP3 Victory ship
- Tonnage: 7,612 GRT, 4,553 NRT
- Displacement: 15,200 tons
- Length: 455 ft (139 m)
- Beam: 62 ft (19 m)
- Draught: 28 ft (8.5 m)
- Installed power: 8,500 shp (6,300 kW)
- Propulsion: HP & LP turbines geared to a single 20.5-foot (6.2 m) propeller, by Westinghouse Electric & Mfg. Co., Essington
- Speed: 16.5 knots
- Boats & landing craft carried: 4 Lifeboats
- Complement: 62 Merchant Marine and 28 US Naval Armed Guards
- Armament: 1 × 5 inch (127 mm)/38 caliber gun as Victory ship; 1 × 3 inch (76 mm)/50 caliber gun; 8 × 20 mm Oerlikon

SS Navajo Victory was a cargo ship built during World War II under the Emergency Shipbuilding program. It was completed by the California Shipbuilding Company on June 30, 1944, and served in the Pacific during World War II. Victory Ship class vessels were designed to replace the Liberty Ship class. Victory Ships were designed to last longer and to serve the US Navy after the war. The Victory Ships were faster, longer, wider, and taller than the Liberty ships, and they had a thinner stack set farther toward the superstructure as well as a long raised forecastle.

== Launch ==
Navajo Victory was christened by Mrs. Tom Price, wife of the general manager of Kaiser Shipyards; the matron of honor was Mrs. Frank Backman. Navajo Victory was the 15th Victory Ship built by the California Shipbuilding Corporation, it was one of 218 Victory Ships named after cities in the United States.

== World War II ==
Navajo Victory conducted supply operations in the Pacific Ocean throughout the war under the operation of the Luckenbach Line. On October 18, 1944, it entered Palau with another cargo ship, Sea Pike, escorted by a Marshall Islands-based destroyer, USS Brackett, for protection. On November 29, 1944, Navajo Victory and Sea Pike delivered troops and supplies from Ewa Villages, Hawaii, to Marine Fighter Attack Squadron 323. Navajo Victory also delivered supplies for the liberation of The Philippines, and for the USS Floyd County, an American tank landing ship. On December 29, 1944, it supplied fleet ships at Seeadler Harbor, Manus Island. On January 16, 1945, it unloaded troop rations at New Guinea for the troops stationed there. It prepared for Operation Downfall, the invasion of Japan, from June 26 to August 15, 1945, with exercises at Leyte. The training exercises were halted after the surrender of Japan on August 15.

== Postwar ==
From 1946 to 1949, Navajo Victory was a relief ship, a fleet supply ship and as part of the National Defense Reserve Fleet in Astoria, Oregon.

== Korean War ==
Navajo Victory served as a United States Merchant Marine vessel during the Korean War. It made nine trips to Korea between November 18, 1950, and December 23, 1952, transporting mail, food, and other supplies, and assisted in the transport of the 140th Tank Battalion. Merchant marine ships transported roughly 75% of all personnel to Korea.

== Menestheus rescue ==
On April 16, 1953, Navajo Victory received a distress call from the motor ship Menestheus, a 7,800-ton British freighter. Menestheus had left Balboa, Panama, on April 5 en route to Osaka with a cargo of rice. When Menestheus was about 90 miles northwest of Magdalena Bay and 130 miles west of Baja California, an auxiliary generator exploded in her engine room, starting a fire that forced the crew to abandon ship. The crew of 81 was in the lifeboats by the time Navajo Victory arrived. Navajo Victory rescued them and took them to San Diego. Navajo Victory towed Menestheus for nearly 500 miles, but was eventually forced to abandon her.

Navajo Victory lay idle in Astoria, Oregon until 1966.

== Vietnam War ==
In 1966 Navajo Victory was reactivated for the Vietnam War. It was operated by the American Mail Line.

After the war in 1973, it was laid up in Suisun Bay as part of the National Defense Reserve Fleet as part of the Suisun Bay Reserve Fleet. It was scrapped at Kaohsiung, Taiwan, in 1985.

== See also ==
- List of Victory ships
- Liberty ship
- Type C1 ship
- Type C2 ship
- Type C3 ship

== Sources ==
- Sawyer, L.A. and W.H. Mitchell. Victory ships and tankers: The history of the ‘Victory’ type cargo ships and of the tankers built in the United States of America during World War II, Cornell Maritime Press, 1974, 0-87033-182-5.
- United States Maritime Commission:
- Victory Cargo Ships
