= HMS Dumbarton Castle (K388) =

History

United Kingdom
- Name: Dumbarton Castle
- Ordered: 2 February 1943
- Builder: Caledon Shipbuilding & Engineering Company, Dundee
- Laid down: 6 May 1943
- Launched: 28 September 1943
- Completed: 25 February 1944
- Identification: Pennant number: K388
- Honours and awards: Atlantic 1944-45
- Fate: Sold for scrap, 16 November 1960

General characteristics
- Class & type: Castle-class corvette
- Displacement: 1,010 long tons (1,030 t) (standard); 1,510 long tons (1,530 t) (deep load)
- Length: 252 ft (76.8 m)
- Beam: 33 ft (10.1 m)
- Draught: 14 ft (4.3 m)
- Installed power: 2 Admiralty 3-drum boilers; 2,880 ihp (2,150 kW)
- Propulsion: 2 shafts, 2 geared steam turbines
- Speed: 16.5 knots (30.6 km/h; 19.0 mph)
- Range: 6,500 nmi (12,000 km; 7,500 mi) at 15 knots (28 km/h; 17 mph)
- Complement: 99
- Sensors & processing systems: Type 145 and Type 147 ASDIC; Type 277 search radar; HF/DF radio direction finder
- Armament: 1 × single 4 in (102 mm) gun; 2 × twin, 2 × single 20 mm (0.8 in) AA guns; 1 × 3-barrel Squid anti-submarine mortar; 15 × depth charges, 1 rack and 2 throwers

HMS Dumbarton Castle (K388) was one of 44 Castle-class corvettes built for the Royal Navy during World War II. She saw action in the Battle of the Atlantic during the war.

== Design and description ==
The Castle-class corvette was a stretched version of the preceding Flower class, enlarged to improve seakeeping and to accommodate modern weapons. The ships displaced 1,010 long tons (1,030 t) at standard load and 1,510 long tons (1,530 t) at deep load. They had an overall length of 252 feet (76.8 m), a beam of 36 feet 9 inches (11.2 m) and a deep draught of 14 feet (4.3 m). They were powered by a pair of triple-expansion steam engines, each driving one propeller shaft using steam provided by two Admiralty three-drum boilers. The engines developed a total of 2,880 indicated horsepower (2,150 kW) and gave a maximum speed of 16.5 knots (30.6 km/h; 19.0 mph). The Castles carried enough fuel oil to give them a range of 6,500 nautical miles (12,000 km; 7,500 mi) at 15 knots (28 km/h; 17 mph). The ships' complement was 99 officers and ratings.

The Castle-class ships were equipped with a single QF 4-inch (102 mm) Mk XVI gun forward, but their primary weapon was their single three-barrel Squid anti-submarine mortar. This was backed up by one depth charge rail and two throwers for 15 depth charges. The ships were fitted with two twin and a pair of single mounts for 20-millimetre (0.8 in) Oerlikon light AA guns. Provision was made for a further four single mounts if needed. They were equipped with Type 145Q and Type 147B ASDIC sets to detect submarines by reflections from sound waves beamed into the water. A Type 277 search radar and a HF/DF radio direction finder rounded out the Castles' sensor suite.

== Construction and career ==
Dumbarton Castle was laid down by Caledon Shipbuilding & Engineering Company at their shipyard in Dundee on 6 May 1943 and launched on 28 September. She was completed on 25 February 1944 and served as a convoy escort until the end of the war in May 1945. The ship was placed in reserve April 1946. Dumbarton Castle was sold for scrap on 16 November 1960 and arrived at Gateshead in March 1961 to be broken up.

== Bibliography ==
- Chesneau, Roger, ed. (1980). Conway's All the World's Fighting Ships 1922–1946. Greenwich, UK: Conway Maritime Press. ISBN 0-85177-146-7.
- Colledge, J. J.; Warlow, Ben (2006) [1969]. Ships of the Royal Navy: The Complete Record of All Fighting Ships of the Royal Navy from the 15th Century to the Present (3rd Rev ed.). London: Chatham Publishing. ISBN 978-1-86176-281-8. OCLC 67375475.
- Goodwin, Norman (2007). Castle Class Corvettes: An Account of the Service of the Ships and of Their Ships' Companies. Liskeard, UK: Maritime Books. ISBN 978-1-904459-27-9.
- Lenton, H. T. (1998). British & Empire Warships of the Second World War. Annapolis, Maryland: Naval Institute Press. ISBN 1-55750-048-7.
- Rohwer, Jürgen (2005). Chronology of the War at Sea 1939–1945: The Naval History of World War Two (Third Revised ed.). Annapolis, Maryland: Naval Institute Press. ISBN 1-59114-119-2.
