= RFA Bacchus (A103) =

History

United Kingdom
- Name: RFA Bacchus
- Namesake: Bacchus
- Ordered: 17 December 1935
- Builder: Caledon Shipbuilding & Engineering Company, Dundee
- Laid down: 14 February 1936
- Launched: 15 June 1936
- Commissioned: 20 September 1936
- Decommissioned: 13 April 1962
- Fate: Scrapped, 1964

General characteristics
- Displacement: 6,325 long tons (6,426 t) full load
- Length: 338 ft (103 m)
- Beam: 49 ft 4 in (15.04 m)
- Draught: 18 ft (5.5 m)
- Propulsion: 1 × 3-cylinder triple expansion steam engine, 2,000 ihp (1,491 kW)
- Speed: 12 knots (22 km/h; 14 mph)
- Complement: 49

RFA Bacchus (A103) was a stores freighter and fresh water distilling ship of the Royal Fleet Auxiliary. She was the second ship to bear this name, replace the one before her. In her time she would carry the pennants X03, B556, A103.

== Service history ==
Built by the Caledon Shipbuilding & Engineering Company, Dundee. She was converted to stores issuing ship in 1942, and reconverted to freighter in 1946.

She was used first on the Chatham - Gibraltar - Malta run taking naval supplies and a small number of passengers. With World War II breaking out she was given the distillation unit from HMS Resolution and after then a stores ship. Attached to the British Pacific Fleet Train in 1945 she spent time at HMS Tamar in Hong Kong.

== Post WWII ==
From 1946 RFA Bacchus started on the overseas sea freight service she would make the run through U.K, Mediterranean and Far East Run through the Suez Canal and Aden. In 1956 she took part in Operation Musketeer on the (Suez).

Laid up at Singapore, she was sold on 14 August 1962 and renamed Pulau Bali. Beached at Singapore on 12 August 1964 prior to scrapping.
