= RFA Green Ranger =

1941 Ranger-class fleet support tanker of the Royal Fleet Auxiliary

Coordinates: 50.972°N 4.535°W

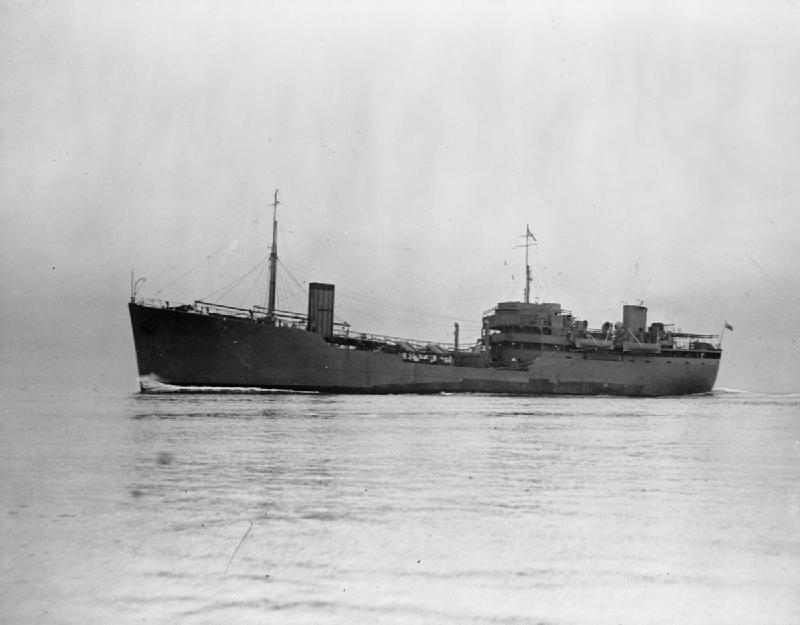

History

United Kingdom
- Name: Green Ranger
- Ordered: 28 August 1939
- Builder: Caledon Shipbuilding & Engineering Company, Dundee
- Yard number: 391
- Laid down: 23 September 1940
- Launched: 21 August 1941
- In service: 4 December 1941
- Out of service: 17 November 1962
- Fate: Wrecked on Gunpath Rock, Devon 17 November 1962

General characteristics
- Class & type: Ranger-class fleet support tanker
- Displacement: 6,700 long tons (6,808 t) full load
- Length: 355 ft 3 in (108.28 m) o/a
- Beam: 47 ft (14 m)
- Draught: 20 ft 2 in (6.15 m)
- Installed power: 3,500 shaft horsepower (2,600 kilowatts)
- Propulsion: 1 × 6-cylinder B&W diesel engine; 1 shaft
- Speed: 13 knots (15 mph; 24 km/h)
- Range: 6,000 nmi (11,000 km) at 13 kn (15 mph; 24 km/h)
- Complement: 40

RFA Green Ranger was a Ranger-class fleet support tanker of the Royal Fleet Auxiliary.

On 24 September 1946, Green Ranger was struck by a torpedo in Portland Harbour, Dorset. Although holed below the waterline, she remained afloat. She was wrecked on the Hartland peninsula, on a large rock, called Gunpath Rock, on 17 November 1962. She broke her tow from the tug that was taking her to be refitted in Cardiff, and drifted onto the rocks. Her skeleton crew of seven were rescued by the Hartland Lifesaving Company, with their breeches buoy. The ship became a total loss, and her remains are still visible at low tide.
