= HMS Bramham =

Destroyer of the Royal Navy

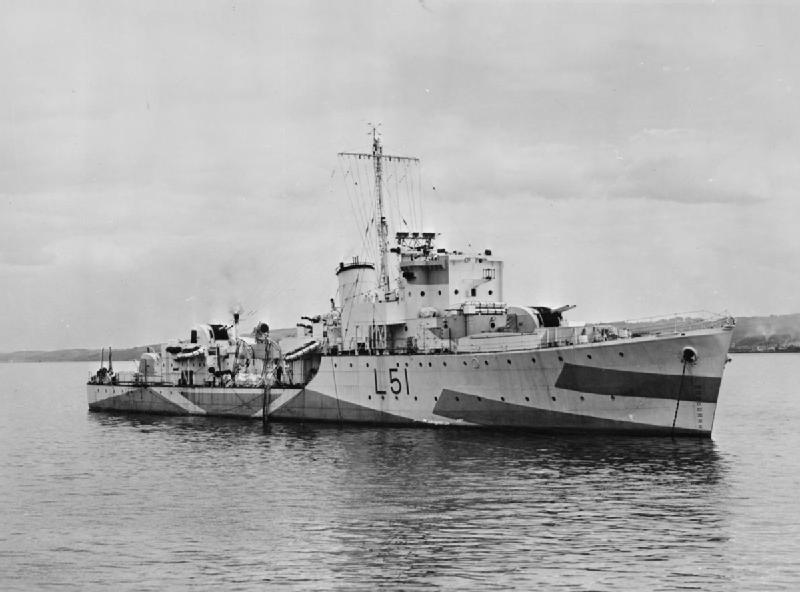
- HMS Bramham on the River Clyde, 1942 (IWM)

History

United Kingdom
- Name: HMS Bramham
- Ordered: 4 September 1940
- Builder: Alexander Stephen and Sons
- Laid down: 7 April 1941
- Launched: 29 January 1942
- Commissioned: 16 June 1942
- Decommissioned: March 1943
- Identification: Pennant number: L51
- Fate: Transferred to Royal Hellenic Navy, March 1943.

Greece
- Name: Themistoklis
- Namesake: Themistocles
- Acquired: March 1943
- Commissioned: 1943
- Decommissioned: 1959
- Stricken: 12 November 1959
- Fate: Returned to Royal Navy, 12 November 1959 and scrapped 1960

General characteristics
- Class & type: Type II Hunt-class destroyer
- Displacement: 1,050 long tons (1,067 t) standard; 1,490 long tons (1,514 t) full load
- Length: 85.34 m (280.0 ft)
- Beam: 9.62 m (31.6 ft)
- Draught: 2.51 m (8 ft 3 in)
- Propulsion: 2 shaft Parsons geared turbines; 19,000 shp
- Speed: 25.5 kn (47.2 km/h; 29.3 mph)
- Range: 3,600 nmi (6,670 km) at 14 knots (26 km/h)
- Complement: 164
- Armament: 6 × QF 4 in Mark XVI on twin mounts Mk. XIX; AAA - 2 × 4 12.7mm Vickers, 2 × 20 mm; 6 Thornycroft depth charge throwers

HMS Bramham (L51) was a Hunt-class destroyer of the Royal Navy laid down in Alexander Stephen and Sons shipyards Govan, Scotland on 7 April 1941. She was launched on 29 January 1942 and commissioned into the Royal Navy on 16 June 1942. She was named after the Bramham Moor Hunt and has been the only Royal Navy warship to bear the name. She was adopted by the town of Beverley in the East Riding of Yorkshire during the Warship Week savings campaign of 1942.

== Royal Navy service ==
Bramham was one of two ships that returned to rescue the survivors of HMS Curacoa.

In the following August she served in Operation Pedestal, a mission to deliver supplies to the besieged island of Malta, as an escorting destroyer. On 12 August she rescued survivors from Deucalion. In the last stages of the operation Bramham along with two other destroyers, Ledbury and Penn took on the final tow of the tanker Ohio into Malta.

== Royal Hellenic Navy service ==
In March 1943 Bramham was transferred to the Royal Hellenic Navy and renamed Themistoklis after the ancient Greek commander Themistocles. She served until 1959 and was then returned to the Royal Navy on 12 November 1959. She was scrapped in Greece in 1960.

== Publications ==
- Colledge, J. J.; Warlow, Ben (2006) [1969]. Ships of the Royal Navy: The Complete Record of All Fighting Ships of the Royal Navy from the 15th Century to the Present (3rd Rev ed.). London: Chatham Publishing. ISBN 978-1-86176-281-8. OCLC 67375475.
- Crabb, Brian James (2014). Operation Pedestal: The story of Convoy WS21S in August 1942. England: Shaun Tyas. ISBN 978-1-907730-19-1.
- The Hunts: a history of the design, development and careers of the 86 destroyers of this class built for the Royal and Allied Navies during World War II, John English, World Ship Society, 1987, ISBN 0-905617-44-4
- Crabb, Brian James (2014). Operation Pedestal: The story of Convoy WS21S in August 1942. England: Shaun Tyas. ISBN 978-1-907730-19-1.
