= Shore leave =

Permission for sailors to be away on land

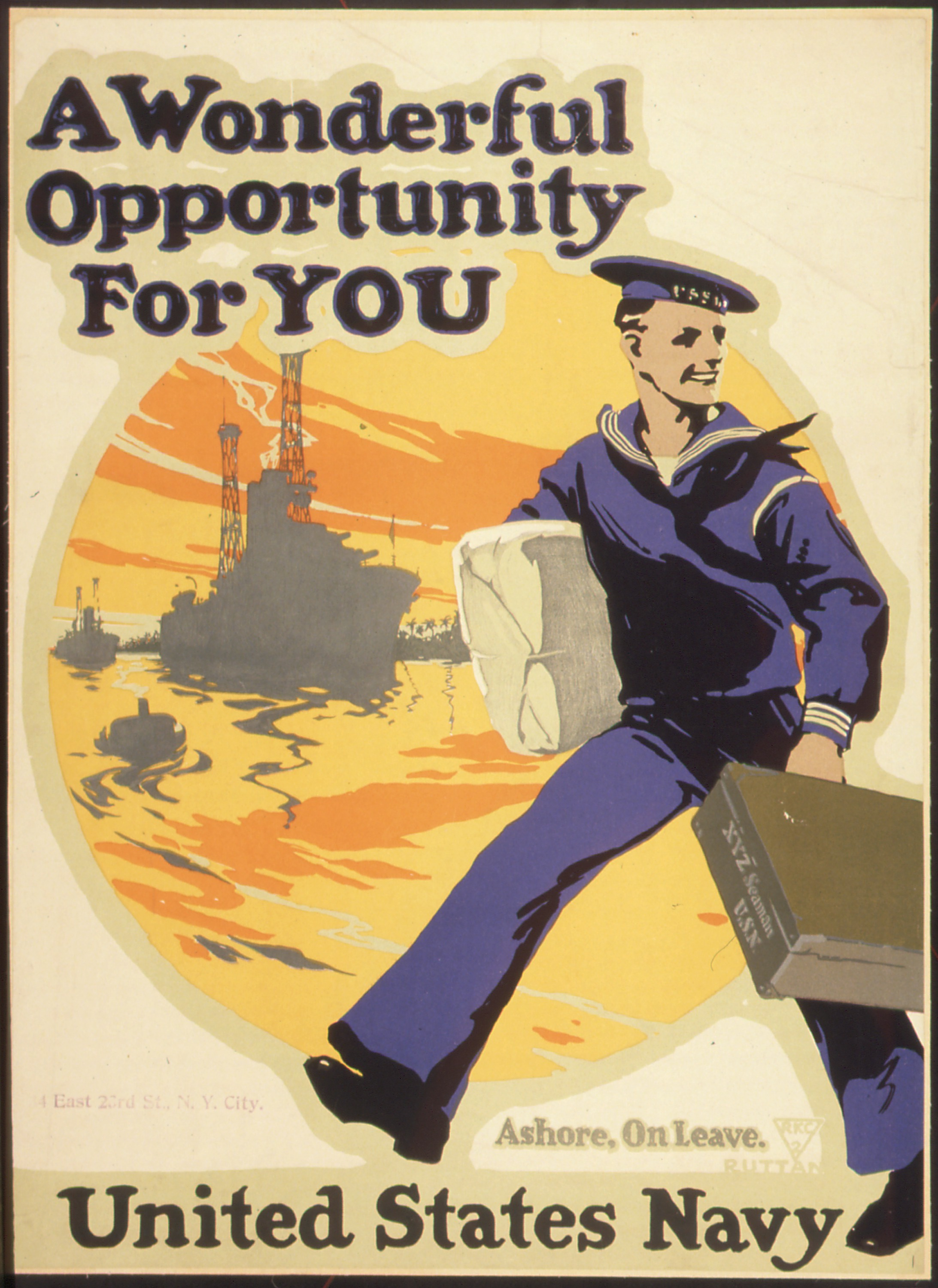
World War I-era recruitment poster promoting shore leave.

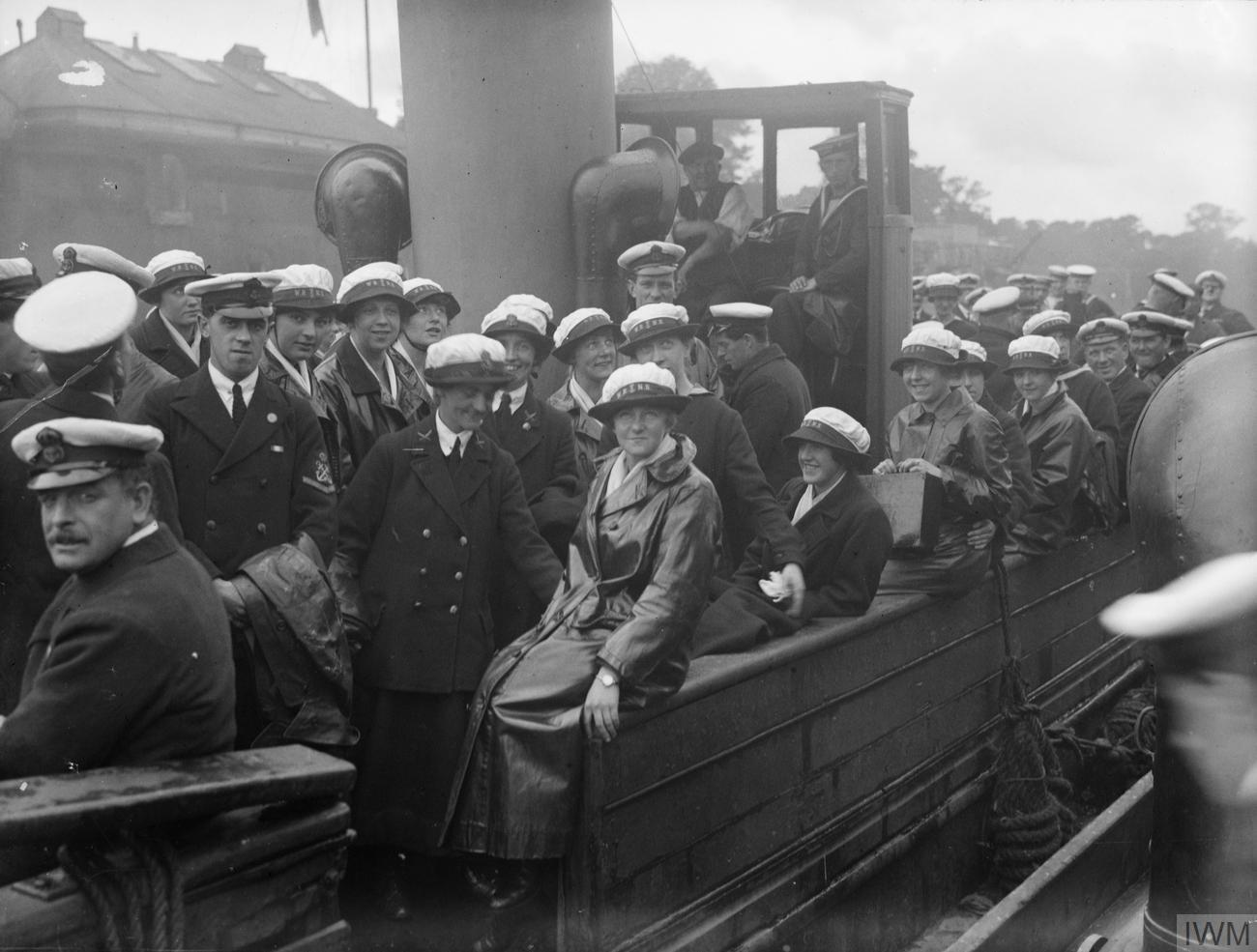
Officers and ratings of the Royal Navy and Women's Royal Naval Service from HMS Essex going on shore leave during World War I.

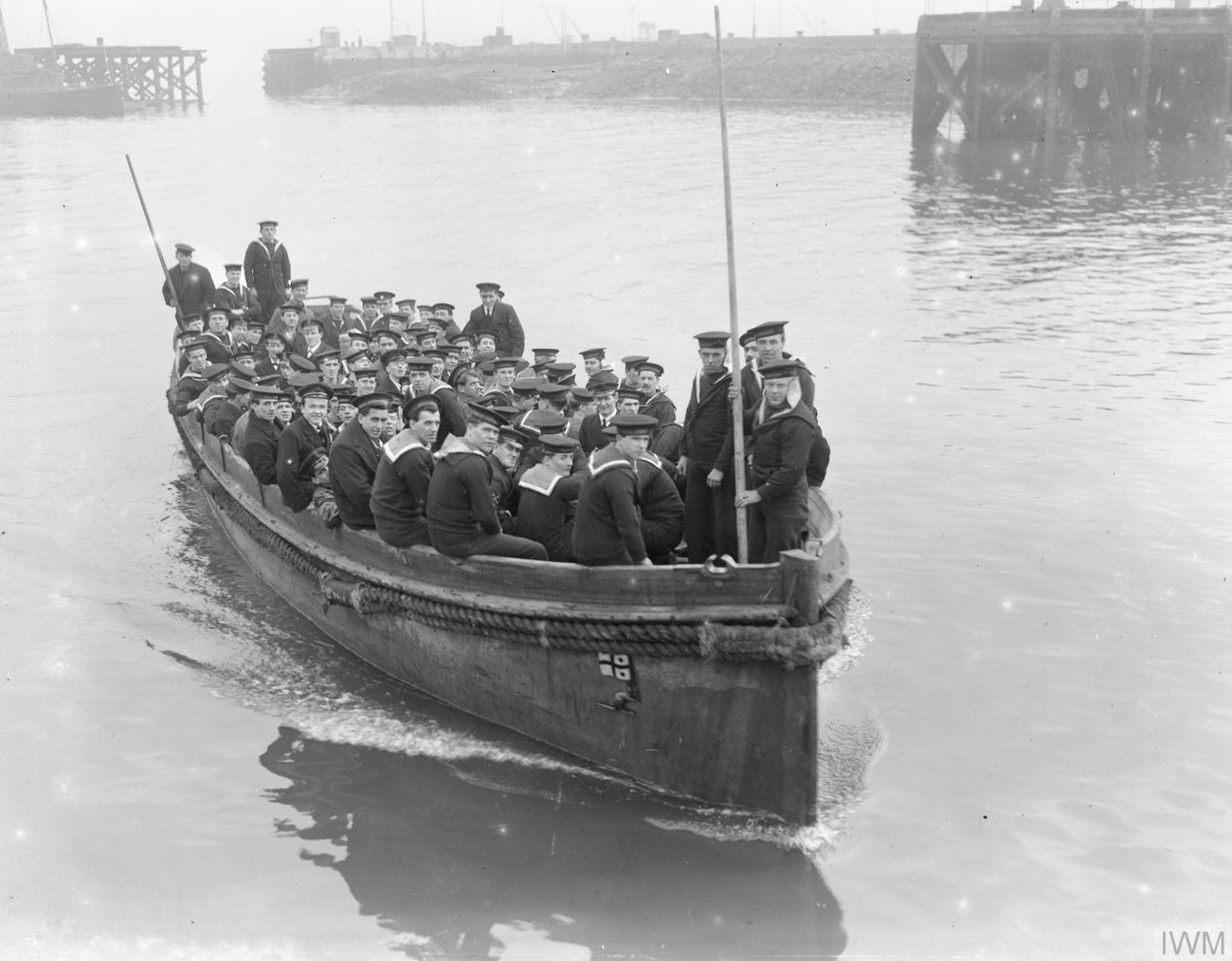
Men of the battlecruiser HMAS Australia aboard a liberty boat coming into Rosyth during World War I.

Shore leave is the leave that professional sailors get to spend on dry land. It is also known as "liberty" within the United States Navy, Coast Guard, and Marine Corps.

During the Age of Sail, shore leave was often abused by the members of the crew, who took it as a prime opportunity to drink in excess, indulge in prostitutes, and desert. Many captains were forced to take on new members of the crew to replace the ones lost due to shore leave.

== Amenities ships ==
As the Royal Navy prepared for operations in the Pacific Ocean during the final stage of World War II, warships were recognized to be operating far from populated ports. Amenities ships were expected to provide an alternative to shore leave at remote island anchorages without commercial recreation facilities.

== United States Navy liberty ==
The United States Navy has organized a 21st-century liberty and single sailor program for active duty military personnel and their guests 18 years or older. The program provides off-duty recreational opportunities for geographic bachelors and unaccompanied service members from all allied military service branches to enhance the quality of life for these individuals by providing a safe and healthy environment for social, cultural, recreation, athletic and fitness activities. Facilities on naval bases offer free use of internet computers and most locations offer a theater or television lounge area, table tennis and pool tables, and video game systems. Some of these liberty facilities offer full snack bars while most offer a variety of snack items; and all offer package tour information and sign ups to visit nearby sites of interest.

== In popular culture ==
Books, films, and songs about sailors on shore leave include Jean Genet's 1953 novel Querelle of Brest; Gene Kelly and Stanley Donen's 1949 film musical of Leonard Bernstein's On the Town; and Belgian singer-songwriter Jacques Brel's 1964 ballad "Amsterdam".

Singer-songwriter Tom Waits, a former Coast Guardsman, wrote a song entitled "Shore Leave" in 1982, and included it on his album of the following year Swordfishtrombones. As well as describing the excesses noted above, it also details the loneliness that many sailors feel when they suddenly find themselves with free time but without loved ones to share it with.

In many science fiction stories in which space travel is depicted, shore leave has the same basic principle but is more metaphorical, as a spacecraft crew does not necessarily disembark to a planetary location with a shoreline. The crew sometimes does not visit a planet at all but instead spend its shore leave on a space station with recreational facilities for crewpersons on leave. Filk musician Leslie Fish recorded a song based on the original Star Trek television series called "Banned from Argo" that detailed the debauchery and chaos caused by the Starfleet crew on shore leave.

In the 1955 film Mister Roberts, Mr. Roberts (Henry Fonda) is forced to give up his dreams by working out a deal with the ship's tyrannical Captain Morton (James Cagney) to give the crew liberty. However, the crew ends up crashing a party for colonel and raiding an admiral's house, which leads to it getting kicked out the very next morning.

== See also ==
- Halifax Riot
- R&R (military)
