= SS Empire Archer =

World War II merchant ship of the United Kingdom

History
- Name: Empire Archer (1942-46); Baron Murray (1946-59); Cathay (1959-63)
- Owner: Ministry of War Transport (1942-46); H Hogarth & Sons, Glasgow (1946-59); Cathay Shipping Corporation, Panama (1959-63)
- Operator: Owner operated except:-; Rayburn & Verel Ltd (1942-46)
- Port of registry: (United Kingdom) Dundee (1942-59); Panama (1959-63)
- Builder: Caledon Shipbuilding & Engineering Company, Dundee
- Yard number: 395
- Launched: 29 June 1942
- Completed: August 1942
- Out of service: 1963
- Identification: UK Official Number 166215 (1942-59); Code letters BDZV (1942-46)
- Fate: Scrapped 1963

General characteristics
- Tonnage: 7,031 GRT
- Length: 431 ft 3 in (131.45 m)
- Beam: 56 ft 3 in (17.15 m)
- Depth: 35 ft 2 in (10.72 m)
- Propulsion: 1 x triple expansion steam engine (North East Marine Engine Co (1938) Ltd) 510 hp (380 kW)

Empire Archer was a 7,031 ton cargo ship which was built in 1942. She was renamed Baron Murray in 1946. In 1959 she was renamed Cathay, serving until 1963 when she was scrapped.

== History ==
=== Wartime ===
Empire Archer was built by Caledon Shipbuilding & Engineering Company, Dundee as yard number 395. She was launched on 29 June 1942 and completed in August 1942. Empire Archer was built for the Ministry of War Transport and managed by Raeburn & Verel Ltd.

Empire Archer served in a number of convoys during the Second World War.

JW51B

Convoy JW 51B sailed from Liverpool on 22 December 1942 and arrived at the Kola Inlet on 4 January 1943. Empire Archer was carrying the convoy's Commodore, Captain R A Melhuish. Her cargo consisted of 21 fighter aircraft, 4,376 tons of general cargo, 18 tanks and 141 vehicles. This convoy was unsuccessfully attacked on 31 December by German heavy warships in the Battle of the Barents Sea

RA 53

Convoy RA 53 sailed from the Kola Inlet on 1 March 1943 and arrived at Loch Ewe on 14 March.

KMS 19

Convoy KMS 19 sailed from the Clyde on 25 June 1943 and passed Gibraltar on 6 July. The convoy was operating in support of Operation Husky. Empire Archer was bound for Malta, from where she sailed on 23 July as part of Convoy KMS 19T, arriving in Tripoli on 24 July.

RA 56

Convoy RA 56 sailed from the Kola Inlet on 3 February 1944 and arrived at Loch Ewe on 11 February.

OS 89

Empire Archer was listed as a member of Convoy OS 89, sailing from Liverpool on 15 September 1944 bound for Freetown, Sierra Leone. Empire Archer was due to sail from Aultbea, but did not sail in this convoy.

The reason that Empire Archer was not in the convoy was that on 13 September she had become stranded on Rathlin Island on her way from Sunderland to join the convoy prior to sailing to the United States. She was refloated and then beached off Bangor. Later she was towed to Belfast and then Glasgow for repairs, arriving on 25 September 1944.

JW 63

Convoy JW 63 sailed from Loch Ewe on 30 December 1944 and arrived at the Kola Inlet on 8 January 1945. Amongst Empire Archer's cargo were Spifire LFIXs MJ188, MJ336, MJ337, MJ400, SM542, SM572, SM588, SM595, SM617, SM619, SM630, SM637 and SM663.

RA 64

Convoy RA 64 sailed from the Kola Inlet on 17 February 1945 and arrived at Loch Ewe on 28 February. Empire Archer was carrying the convoys Vice Commodore.

=== Postwar ===
In 1946, Empire Archer was sold to H Hogarth & Sons, Glasgow and renamed Baron Murray. She served with them until 1959 when she was sold to the Cathay Shipping Corporation, Panama and renamed Cathay. In 1963, she was sent to Yokosuka for scrapping, arriving on 24 July.

== Official number and code letters ==
Official Numbers were a forerunner to IMO Numbers.

Empire Archer and Baron Murray had the UK Official Number 166215. Empire Archer used the Code Letters BDZV.
