= Alfred Büchi =

Swiss engineer

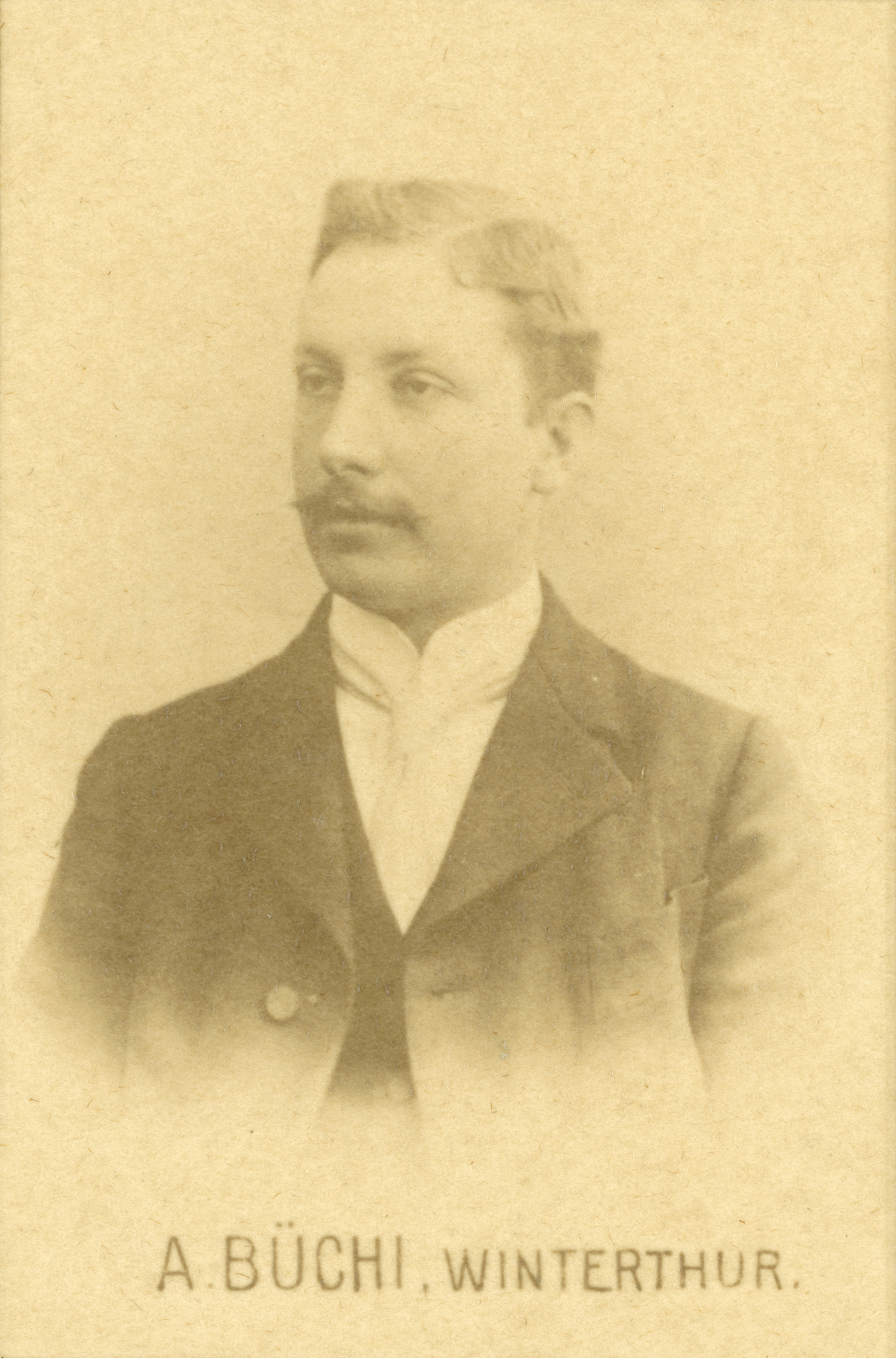
Alfred Büchi

Alfred Büchi (July 11, 1879 – October 27, 1959) was a Swiss engineer and inventor. He was best known as the inventor of turbocharging. Büchi was born July 11, 1879, in Winterthur, Switzerland, growing up there and in Ludwigshafen. He was the son of Johann Büchi, a chief executive at Swiss industrial engineering and manufacturing firm Sulzer.

He was well-positioned to pursue a similar field and would eventually achieve fame as a result of his inventions. In 1899 he enrolled as a machine engineering student at Federal Polytechnic Institute (ETH) in Zürich, receiving a degree in 1903. From there he practised engineering in Belgium and England before returning to Switzerland (Wetzikon) in 1908.

== The turbocharger ==
During his early years outside Switzerland, Büchi became fascinated with the challenge of improving combustion engine efficiency relating to exhaust heat loss.

=== Büchi's patents ===
Büchi's patent, No. 204630 received from the Imperial Patent Office of the German Reich on November 6, 1905, describes a "highly supercharged compound engine" with a solution to capture such heat using an "axial compressor, radial piston engine and axial turbine on a common shaft".

The idea was simple, however the materials and fuels required for it to function were not yet available. While a later patent (1925) describing "pulse operation for low-pressure supercharging" is considered his landmark, due to Büchi's invention the year 1905 is thus acknowledged as the birth of the turbocharging era. Büchi's principles from 1905 remain the same for turbocharging today. Power and efficiency are improved "by forcing additional air into the cylinders, with the heat from the exhaust gas used to drive the turbine".

=== Sulzer and Brown Boveri ===
Joining Sulzer in 1909, Büchi researched diesel engines while continuing to investigate turbocharging innovations, focusing on large marine applications. In 1911 Sulzer opened an experimental turbocharger plant, and Büchi's first prototype for turbocharged diesel engine was produced in 1915. Intending to mitigate effects of thin air in high altitude for airplane engines, this version did not maintain consistent boost pressure and thus was not well received.

In 1915 Büchi began a dialog with Brown, Boveri & Cie (BBC) to set up cooperation, though it took them until 1923 to reach an agreement. Büchi went on to lead the Sulzer diesel department during 1918-19.

=== Marine applications ===
Nearly two decades later Büchi's invention achieved practical application. The first use of turbocharging technology was for large marine engines, when the German Ministry of Transport commissioned the construction of the passenger liners Preussen and Hansestadt Danzig in 1923. Both ships featured twin ten-cylinder diesel engines with output boosted from 1750 to 2500 horsepower by turbochargers designed by Büchi and built under his supervision by Brown Boveri (BBC) (now ABB).

=== Büchi Syndicate ===
Eventually near the end of his tenure at the firm, in 1925 Büchi for the first time succeeded in combining his technology with a diesel engine, increasing efficiency by over 40%, the same year filing Swiss patent number 122 664 under his own name ("Büchi-Duplex turbocharging system"). In 1926 he left Sulzer and established a new company known as the "Büchi Syndicate". Büchi headed engineering and customer relations, Swiss Locomotive and Machine Works (SLM) in Winterthur provided engines for testing, and BBC in Baden built turbochargers. The same year Büchi also became Director of SLM.

Two years later Büchi's new, larger turbocharger design yielded improved results, leading to an increase in licensing agreements with engine builders. The Büchi Syndicate stayed together until 1941 when BBC continued turbo-related operations under its own name.

=== Automotive applications ===
Racecar engines began to utilize turbocharging in the 1930s and the technology reached commercial automobiles toward the end of the decade. In 1938, Saurer in Switzerland produced the first truck engine to take advantage of turbocharging.

== Death ==
Büchi died October 27, 1959, and was buried in Winterthur's Rosenberg cemetery.

== Honours ==
In 1938 Büchi was awarded an honorary doctorate from ETH Zurich.

In summer 2012 the city of Winterthur celebrated the inventor and pioneer with the inauguration of the road "Alfred Büchi Way" in Neuwiesenquartier.
