= Caledon Shipbuilding & Engineering Company =

Former Scottish shipbuilding company

- Company type: Public
- Industry: Shipbuilding
- Founded: 1874
- Defunct: 1981
- Fate: Closed
- Headquarters: Dundee, Scotland

The Caledon Shipbuilding & Engineering Company, Limited was a major Scottish shipbuilding company based in Dundee, Scotland that traded for more than a century and built more than 500 ships.

== History ==
W.B. Thompson CBE (1837 - 1923) founded the Tay Foundry in 1866 and the WB Thompson Shipbuilding in 1874. In 1889 the company took over the Marine Engineering Works at Lilybank Foundry. In 1896 WB Thompson was restructured and the name changed to Caledon Shipbuilding & Engineering Company in honour of the founder's first customer, the Earl of Caledon.

In 1932 Caledon closed the Lilybank engine works. In 1968 Caledon merged with Henry Robb of Leith, forming Robb Caledon Shipbuilding Limited. The Caledon Shipyard built its last ships in 1980 and operations ceased there in 1981.

The Caledon yard built a total of 509 ships, plus 20 barges and 34 launches.

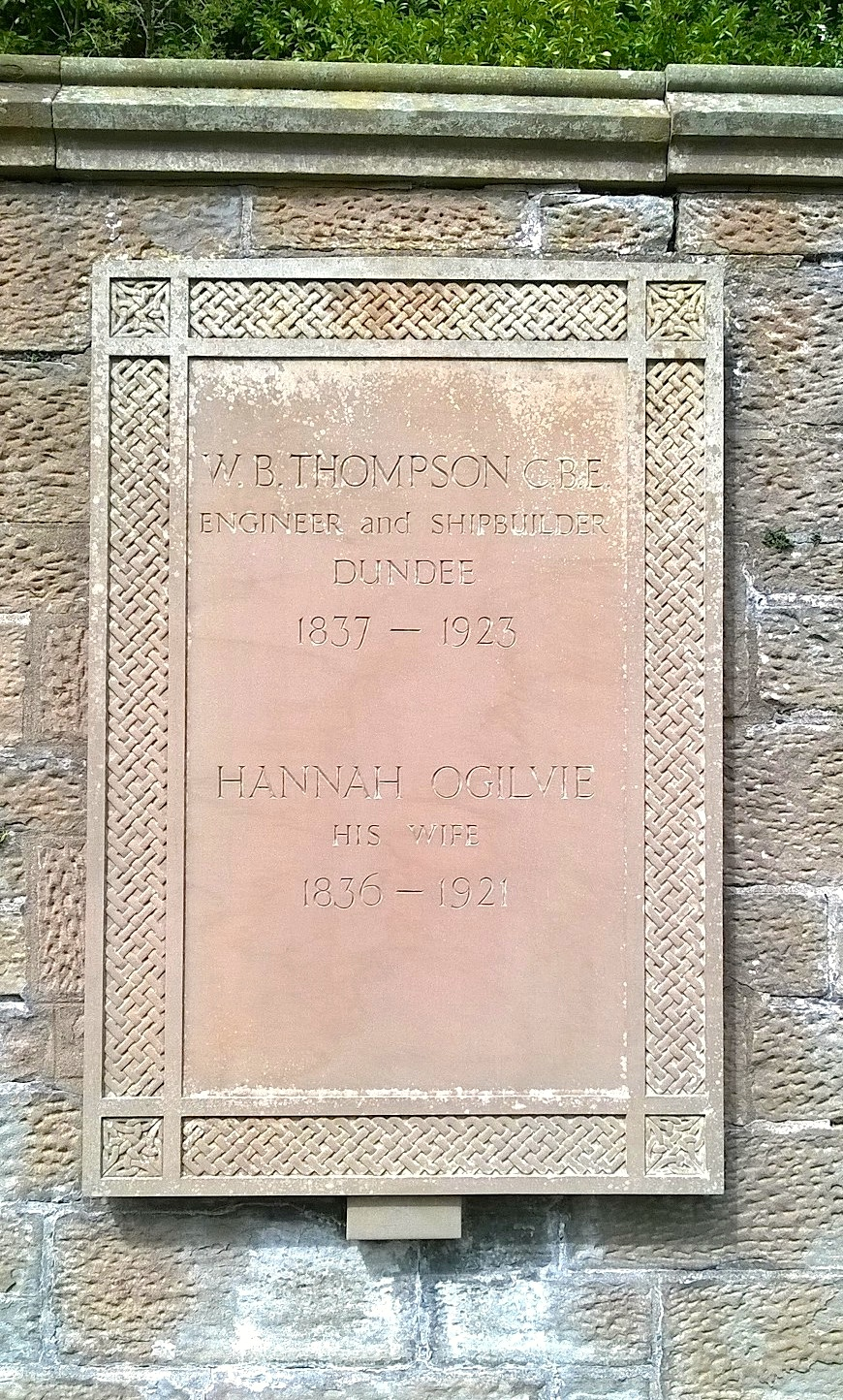
W. B. Thompson CBE, shipbuilder, Dundee

W.B. Thompson CBE and his wife Hannah Ogilvie (1836 - 1921) are interred at Western Cemetery, Dundee.

Victoria Drummond, the first woman marine engineer in the UK, completed her apprenticeship with Caledon.

== Ships built by Caledon ==
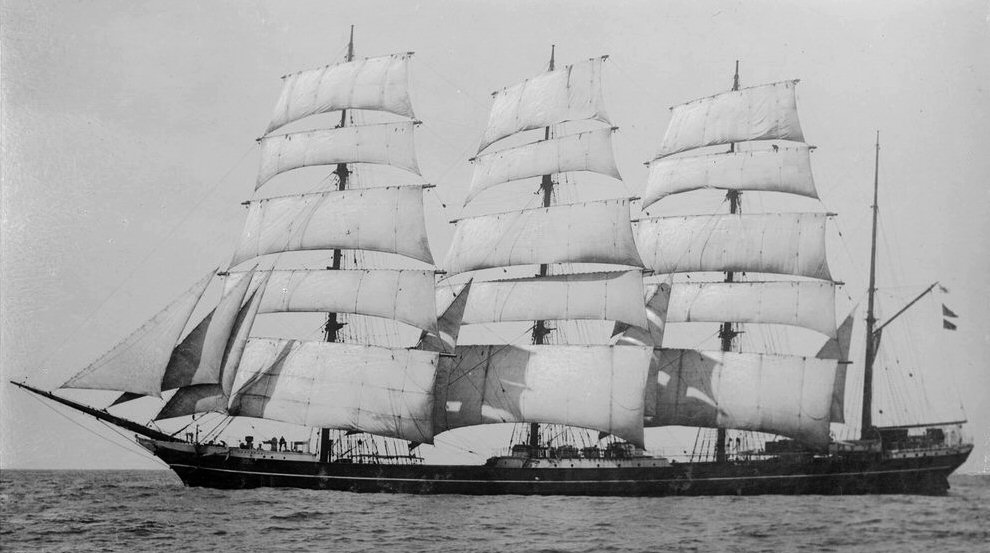
Garthpool

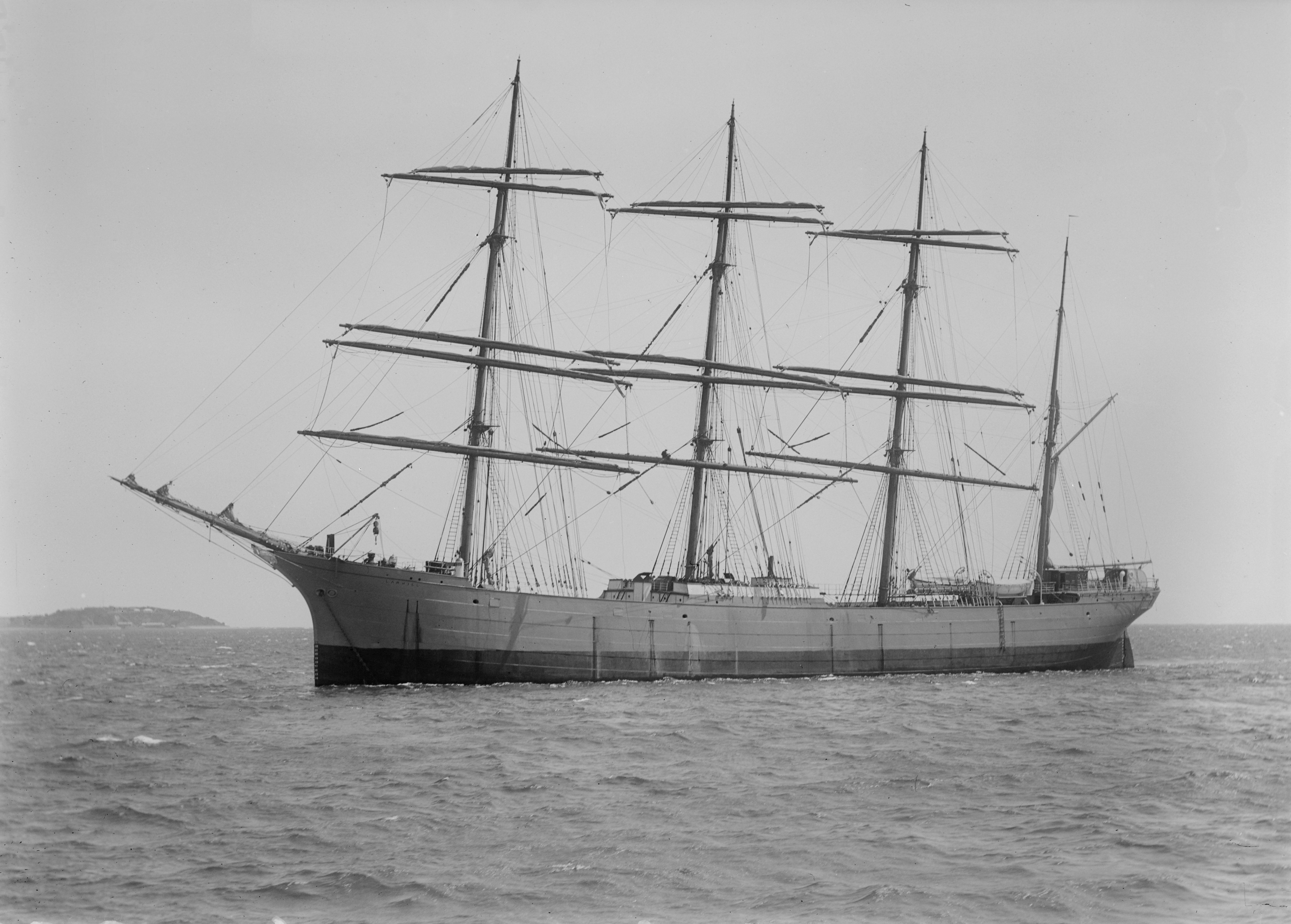
Lawhill

Ships built by Caledon include:

=== Naval ===
Aircraft carriers

- HMS Activity (United Kingdom) Royal Navy

Frigates

- HMS Loch Lomond (United Kingdom) Royal Navy
- HMS Loch More (United Kingdom) Royal Navy
- HMS Loch Arkaig (United Kingdom) Royal Navy
- HMS Loch Tralaig (United Kingdom) Royal Navy
- a further ship of this class – HMS Loch Seaforth – was cancelled.

Survey ships

- HMS Hecla Royal Navy
- HMS Herald Royal Navy

Corvettes

- HMS Carisbrooke Castle (United Kingdom) Royal Navy
- HMS Dumbarton Castle (United Kingdom) Royal Navy
- HMS Hurst Castle (United Kingdom) Royal Navy

Landing ships

- HMS Glengyle (United Kingdom) Royal Navy

Auxiliaries

- RFA Bacchus (United Kingdom) Royal Fleet Auxiliary
- RFA Gold Ranger (United Kingdom) Royal Fleet Auxiliary
- RFA Green Ranger (United Kingdom) Royal Fleet Auxiliary
- RFA Gray Ranger (United Kingdom) Royal Fleet Auxiliary

=== Merchant ===
Yard No	Name	Type	Launch	Owner/Notes
5	Ilala	single screw iron steamship	1874	WB Thompson
7	Scotia	single screw iron steamship	1875	Dundee, Perth & London Shipping Co
8	Glentrum	single screw steamship	1875	James Mitchell
11	Astoria	sailing ship	1876	Joseph Gibson & Co
14	Ugarte No 1	single screw iron steamship	1876	Ugarte Bros
16	Earlshall	iron barque	1876	Robertson Bros
17	Lintrathen	iron sailing barque	1876	Joseph Gibson & Co
18	Tulchan	iron sailing barque	1876	AM Banks & Co
19	Altona	single screw iron steamship	1877	Yorkshire Coal & Steam Shipping Co
20	Kaffrarian	steam paddle tug	1877	Kaffrarian Steam Landing & Shipping Co
21	Rosedale	twin screw iron steamship	1877	Gippsland SN Co
22	Glenisia	single screw iron steamship	1878	James Mitchell
23	Fairport	single screw iron coastal steamship	1877	John Smart Roy
24	Vesper	single screw iron steamship	1878	RA Mudie & sons
25	Marathon	single screw steamship	1878	D Scott & Son
27	Otto M'Combie	single screw iron steamship	1879	J M'Combie
28	Inchcape	single screw iron steam coaster	1879	JS Roy & David Linsay
29	Vasco da Gama	single screw iron steamship	1879	George MacAndrew
30	Coraki	twin screw shallow draught passenger steamship	1879	Clarence & Richmond SN Co
31	Dundee	single screw iron steamship	1880	RA Mudie & Sons
32	Garry	single screw iron steamship	1880	North Sea Steam Shipping Co
33	Countess of Cromertie	single screw steamship	1880	WB Thomson
34	Kenmore	single screw iron steamship	1880	Albany Shipping Co
36	Diamond	single screw iron steamship	1881	Dundee Gem Line SS Co
37	Opal	single screw iron steamship	1881	Dundee Gem Line SS Co
38	John Ray	single screw iron steamship	1881	MA Ray & Son
40	Coxhaven	single screw steamship	1882	Yorkshire Coal & Steam Shipping Co
41	Dundee	iron sailing ship	1882	Charles Barrie
42	Calabria	single screw iron steamship	1883	D Scott & Son
43	Goya	single screw iron steamship	1882	Miguel Saenz
44	Lista	single screw iron steamship	1882	Miguel Saenz
43	St Thomas	single screw steel steamship	1882	Arbroath & London SS Co
47	Lauderdale	single screw cargo steamship	1882	R Mackill & Co
50	Fushun	single screw steel steamship	1883	WB Thompson
53	Jasper	single screw steel steamship	1883	Dundee Gem Line SS Co
56	AD Bordes	four-masted sailing ship	1884	AD Bordes et Fils
57	Retriever	twin screw iron steam tug	1884	Retriever Steamship Co
58	Craig Burn	four-masted iron sailing ship	1884	R Shankland & Co
59	Dresden	single screw steel steamship	1884	Yorkshire Coal & Steam Shipping Co
60	Lanquedoc	iron passenger steamship	1884	SG de Transporte Marte de Vapeur
62	Firth of Stronsa	barque	1885	J Spencer & Co
63	Chili	iron barque	1885	AD Bordes et Fils
64	Firth of Solway	barque	1885	J Spencer & Co
65	Indra	iron twin screw steam tug	1888	Ganges Steam Towing Co
68	Avocet	single screw steel steamship	1885	Cork Steamship Co
71	Tarapaca	four-masted iron sailing ship	1886	AD Boedes et Fils
73	Eddystone	single screw cargo and passenger steamship	1886	Clyde Shipping Co
75	Dalhousie	single screw iron steam trawler	1886	WB Thompson
76	Lamberton	iron steam trawler	1885	Berwick Trawling Co
78	Euphrates	irson steam trawler	1886	Thomas Hamling
81	Portland	single screw iron steamship	1887	Clyde Shipping Co
82	Glanmire	single screw iron steamship	1887	City of Cork Steam Packet Co
83	Retriever	twin screw iron steam tug	1888	Turner, Morrison & Co
85	Ibis	single screw steel steamship	1888	Cork Steamship Co
86	Fulmar	single screw steamship	1888	Cork Steamship Co
87	Curfew	single screw steamship	1888	RA Mudie & Son
88	Pladda	single screw steamship	1889	Clyde Shipping Co
89	Arrow	twin screw steam tug	1889	Shropshire Union Railways & Canal Co
90	Red Sea	single screw steamship	1889	Dundee, Perth & London Shipping Co
91	Ailsa Craig	single screw steamship	1890	Clyde Shipping Co
93	Egret	three-masted single screw steel steamship	1890	Cork Steamship Co
95	Perth	single screw steel steamship	1890	JW Kidd
96	Ptarmigan	single screw steel steamship	1890	Cork Steam Shipping Co
98	Arranmore	single screw iron steamship	1890	Clyde Shipping Co
106	Berlin	single screw iron steamship	1891	Yorkshire Coal & Steam Shipping Co
107	Juteopolis	steel-hulled four-masted barque	1891	Charles Barrie
112	Lawhill	steel-hulled four-masted barque	24 Aug 1892	Charles Barrie
159	Californian	cargo and passenger liner	26 Nov 1901	Leyland Line
177	Ardeola	cargo and passenger liner	17 Jun 1904	Yeoward Brothers
189	Lanfranc	passenger liner	18 Oct 1906	Alfred Booth and Company
200	Hilary	cargo and passenger liner	31 May 1908	Alfred Booth and Company
209	Aguila	cargo and passenger liner	6 May 1909	Yeoward Brothers
216	Andorinha	cargo and passenger liner	2 Mar 1911	Yeoward Brothers
224	Viera y Clavijo	cargo and passenger liner	7 Nov 1911	Compañía de Vapores Correos Interinsulares Canarios
225	Gomera-Hierro	cargo and passenger liner	22 Jan 1912	Compañía de Vapores Correos Interinsulares Canarios
227	Ardeola	cargo and passenger liner	17 July 1912	Yeoward Brothers
228	Dublin	cargo and passenger liner	14 Aug 1912	Compañía Argentina de Nav
235	Alban	cargo and passenger liner	11 Mar 1914	Alfred Booth and Company
242	Aguila	cargo and passenger liner	16 Sep 1916	Yeoward Brothers
259	Perseus	refrigerated cargo	1922	China Mutual SN Co
275	Alondra	cargo and passenger liner	30 Nov 1921	Yeoward Brothers.
279	Avoceta	cargo and passenger liner	21 Sep 1922	Yeoward Brothers
282	British Commander	oil tanker	1922	British Tanker Company
283	British Commodore	oil tanker	1923	British Tanker Company
309	Alca	cargo and passenger liner	15 Jun 1927	Yeoward Brothers
313	British Faith	oil tanker	1928	British Tanker Company
314	British Hope	oil tanker	1928	British Tanker Company
376	Tambua	cargo ship	1938	Colonial Sugar Refinery Co
381	NLV Hesperus	lighthouse tender	1939	Northern Lighthouse Board
389	RFA Gold Ranger	Ranger class attendant oil tanker	12 Mar 1941	Royal Fleet Auxiliary
390	RFA Gray Ranger	Ranger class attendant oil tanker	27 May 1941	Royal Fleet Auxiliary
391	RFA Green Ranger	Ranger class attendant oil tanker	21 Aug 1941	Royal Fleet Auxiliary
393	Empire Heywood	cargo ship	21 Oct 1941	Ministry of War Transport
394	Empire Prince	cargo ship	31 Mar 1942	Ministry of War Transport
395	Empire Archer	cargo ship	29 Jun 1942	Ministry of War Transport
396	Empire Bard	heavy lift ship	30 Dec 1941	Ministry of War Transport
409	Rhexenor	single screw motor cargo ship	1945	China Mutual SN Co
410	Stentor	single screw motor cargo ship	1946	Ocean SS Co
426	Rajah Brooke	cargo and passenger ship	1948	Sarawak Steamship Co
471	Rossetti	cargo	1950	Lamport and Holt
507	NLV Pharos	lighthouse tender	1955	Northern Lighthouse Board
508	Canadian Star	cargo ship	1956	Blue Star Line
531	NLV Pole Star	lighthouse tender	1961	Northern Lighthouse Board
532	Ngakuta	cargo ship	1962	Union Steamship Co
533	Ngatoro	cargo ship	1962	Union Steamship Co
536	John Burns	ferry	1963	Woolwich Free Ferry
537	Ernest Bevin	ferry	1963	Woolwich Free Ferry
538	James Newman	ferry	1963	Woolwich Free Ferry
539	Parthia	cargo ship	1963	Cunard
541	Port Huon	cargo ship	1965	Port Line
542	Port Albany	cargo ship	1965	Port Line
543	Ngahere	cargo ship	1966	Union Steamship Co
544	Ngapara	cargo ship	1966	Union Steamship Co
560	Caedmon	C-class ferry	3 May 1973	Sealink
561	Cenwulf	C-class ferry	1 Jun 1973	Sealink
562	Cenred	C-class ferry	3 Jul 1973	Sealink
564	CS Monarch	cable layer	12 Feb 1975	The Post Office
570	Tucuman	refrigerated cargo	24 Jan 1978	Lineas Maritimas Argentinas
572	Golden Bay	bulk carrier	12 Feb 1979	Blue Circle Cement
575	Malbork II	bulk carrier	5 Oct 1978	Polsteam
576	Bytom	bulk carrier	19 Oct 1979	Polsteam
577	Kościerzyna	cargo ship	21 Dec 1980	Polsteam
579	Countess	ferry	Mar 1981	British Shipbuilders

=== Other ===
- HMS Triad a yacht that was hired into service of the Royal Navy during World War I
