= Quebec City (disambiguation) =

Quebec City is the capital of the Canadian province of Quebec.

Quebec City or City of Quebec may also refer to:

== Places ==
- Urban agglomeration of Quebec City
- Communauté métropolitaine de Québec, the Metropolitan Community of Quebec City
- Communauté urbaine de Québec (CUQ), the Quebec City Urban Community (Metro Quebec City)
- Old Quebec, the historic district of Quebec City; the walled city of Quebec

== Other uses ==
- HMCS Ville de Quebec (a.k.a. HMCS Quebec City), a Royal Canadian Navy ship name

== See also ==
- Name of Quebec City
- List of municipalities in Quebec
- Ville de Québec (disambiguation)
- Quebec (disambiguation)
