= Quebec (disambiguation) =

Quebec is a French-speaking province in Eastern Canada.

Quebec may also refer to:

- Province of Quebec (1763–1791), a British colony in North America
- Quebec City, the capital city of the province of Quebec

== Places ==
=== Canada ===
- Québec (electoral district), Canadian federal electoral district
- Quebec (census division), a census division and county-municipal territorial unit of the province
- Communauté métropolitaine de Québec, an administrative division of the province comprising the Quebec City metropolitan area
- Québec administrative region, the former name of the Capitale-Nationale administrative region of Quebec
- Quebec County, Quebec, a historic county comprising Quebec City and its environs

=== United Kingdom ===
- Quebec, County Durham, a village in England, in the United Kingdom
- Quebec, West Sussex, a UK location

=== United States ===
- Quebec, Connecticut, a neighborhood in the Borough of Danielson, Windham County, Connecticut
- Quebec, Montana
- Quebeck, Tennessee

== Arts ==
- "Quebec" (song), a 2026 song by Drake
- Quebec (album), a 2003 album by Ween
- Quebec (1951 film), a film directed by George Templeton about the Patriotes Rebellion
- Quebec (2007 film), a film directed by Steve Conrad
- Québec: Duplessis and After..., a 1972 film directed by Denys Arcand
- Ike Quebec (1918–1963), jazz tenor saxophonist

== Ships ==
- HMCS Quebec, a list of ships
- HMCS Ville de Quebec
- HMS Quebec, three ships and a shore establishment of the British Royal Navy
- Quebec-class submarine, the NATO reporting name for the Soviet Project 615 submarine

== Other uses ==
- "Quebec", the letter Q in the NATO phonetic alphabet
- .quebec, the geographic top-level domain (GeoTLD) for Quebec
- Quebec platelet disorder, a genetic blood disorder
- 45555 Quebec, a British LMS Jubilee Class locomotive
- Pingualuit crater, a meteor crater once known as the New Quebec Crater

== See also ==
- Battle of Quebec (disambiguation), numerous battles in or near Quebec
- Quebecer (disambiguation)
- Québécois (disambiguation)
- Quebec City (disambiguation)
- Ville de Québec (disambiguation)
