= Ville de Québec =

Ville de Québec is the French wording for Quebec City (direct translation: City of Québec) and may also refer to:

- HMCS Ville de Quebec, naval vessels named after the city
  - HMCS Ville de Québec (FFH 332), the second and current vessel- a Halifax class frigate

== See also ==
- Name of Quebec City
- Quebec City (disambiguation)
- Quebec (disambiguation)
