= Québécois =

Québécois(e) or Quebecois(e) may refer to:

- Related to the Canadian province of Quebec
  - most often, Québécois people, a native or inhabitant of Quebec
  - any native or resident of Quebec, see Demographics of Quebec
  - the French culture of Quebec
- Quebec French, the variety of French spoken in Quebec
- A native or inhabitant of the province's capital, Quebec City (rare in English)
- Le Québécois, a newspaper based in Quebec City
- Algoma Quebecois, a freighter launched in 1963
- Groupe La Québécoise, a passenger transport company

== See also ==
- French Canadian
- Quebecer (disambiguation)
- Quebec (disambiguation)
