= Northern Barrage =

British minefield in WW2

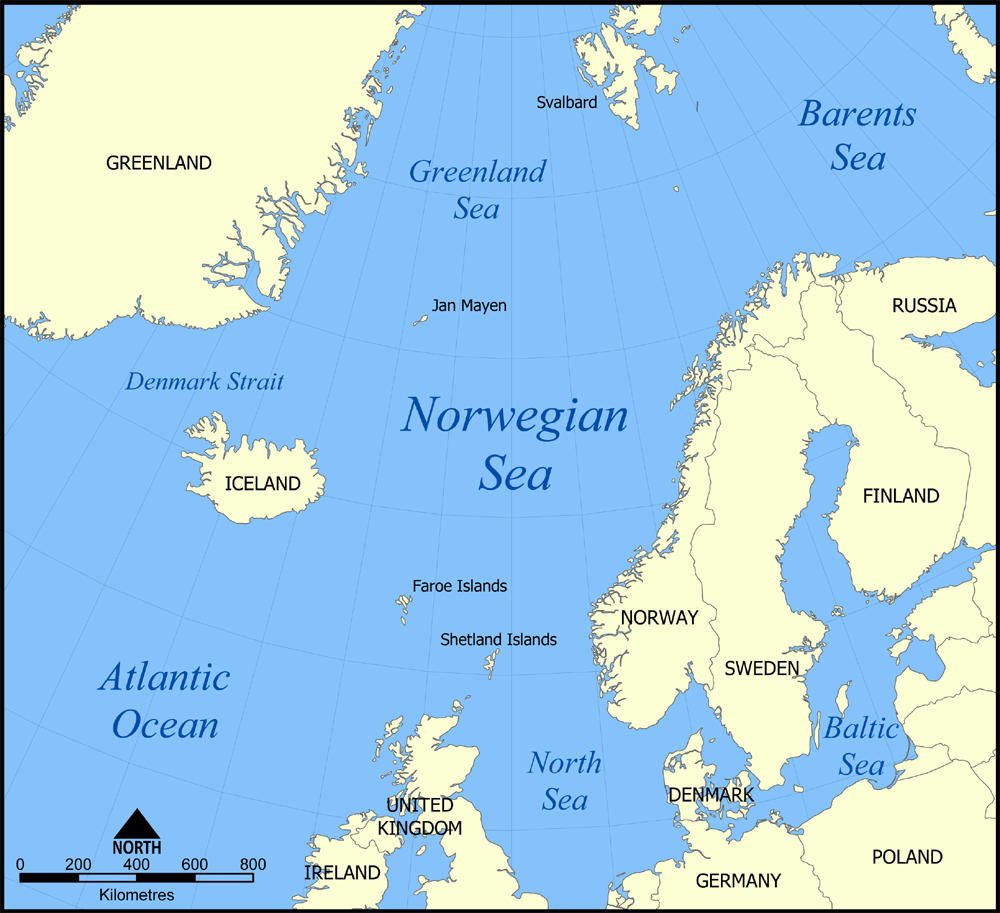
Map of the Norwegian Sea

The Northern Barrage was the name given to minefields laid by the British during World War II to restrict German access to the Atlantic Ocean. The barrage stretched from the Orkney to the Faroe Islands and on toward Iceland. Mines were also laid in the Denmark Strait, north of Iceland.

== Concept ==
The objective of a defensive minefield is to restrict movement of enemy ships into areas used by friendly shipping. The assumed presence of a minefield may have a morale effect of assumed risk in addition to actually damaging ships attempting to cross the field. In July 1939, before World War II had begun, the possibility of a Northern Barrage between the Orkney Islands and Norway (similar to the North Sea Mine Barrage of World War I) had been considered. Other alternatives were investigated after the occupation of Norway by the Germans in April 1940.

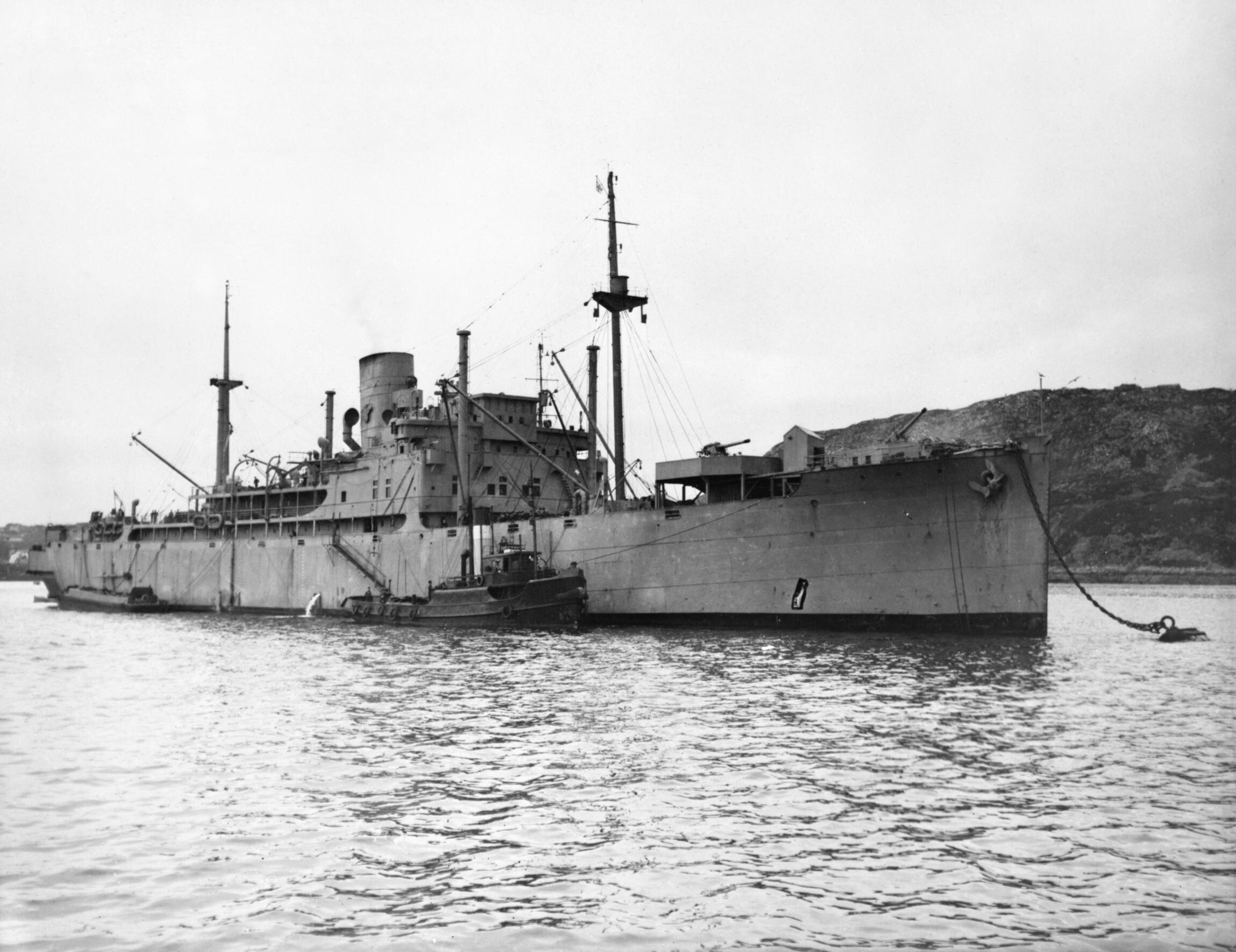
Minelayer Southern Prince was flagship of the first Minelaying Squadron.

Conventional mines of the era employed a contact-fuzed explosive charge within a buoyant shell suspended over an anchor attached by a wire rope. Use of such mines against surface ships required the mine to be suspended at a depth no greater than the ship's draft. The ability of a submarine to submerge under that depth would require layers of contact-fuzed mines at differing depths to afford equal probability of destruction. The World War I mine barrage had reduced the number of mines required by using a copper wire antenna with a float to extend it above the mine. A ship's steel hull touching the copper antenna would form a battery and seawater acted as an electrolyte completing a circuit with an insulated copper plate on the mine surface to actuate a detonating relay within the mine.

American Mk 6 mines had been used for the deeper water portions of the World War I mine barrage. The Royal Navy standard Mk XVII mine inventory available for use at the outbreak of World War II lacked an antenna fuze. The Mk XVII mine could be suspended at depths as great as 300 feet (91 m) below the surface anchored in water as deep as 6,000 feet (1,800 m). Those depth capabilities suggested the possibility of laying mines along the Iceland–Faeroes Ridge, a submerged mountain range between Iceland and the Faeroe Islands which separates the deeper portions of the Norwegian Sea to the north and the Atlantic Ocean to the south. The ridge top is less than 500 metres (1,600 ft) below the surface and significantly shallower east of Iceland and on the Faeroe shelf. Channels are 850 metres (2,790 ft) deep between the Faeroe shelf and Scotland and in the Denmark Strait between Greenland and Iceland. Mk XVII mines would be laid in the shallower areas while the antenna-fuzed Mk XX mine was under development. Gaps were planned to allow passage of the fleet and convoys.

== Navigation ==
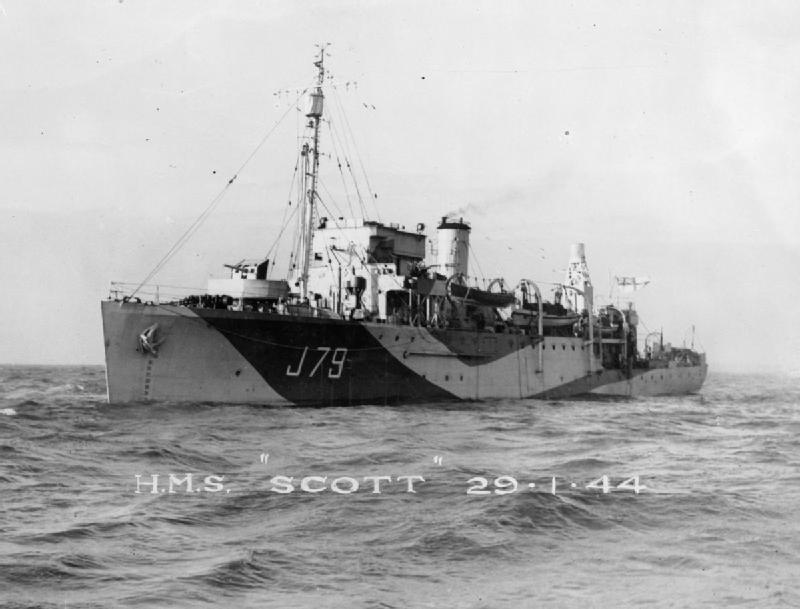
HMS Scott did much of the survey work to locate the Northern Barrage.

Maintaining records of minefield locations is an important element of defensive minefields, since these minefields are often close to waters traditionally used by friendly shipping. Most defensive minefields had historically been within visual distance of navigational aids establishing precise locations. Laying the Northern Barrage in waters so far from land was a challenging navigational problem before Global Positioning System information was available. Much of the preparatory survey work was completed by the survey vessel HMS Scott. Scott later operated with the minelayers placing the deep water minefields from the spring of 1942 until minelaying was discontinued in the autumn of 1943. Scott helped establish the boundaries of adjacent minefields so the minelayers could minimize un-mined gaps without accidentally straying into mined areas.

== Laying the barrage ==
The first Minelaying Squadron, based at Kyle of Lochalsh (code-named port ZA for secrecy) was formed in June 1940. Five fast and modern cargo liners were requisitioned from civilian service, but the conversion to auxiliary minelayers HMS Agamemnon, Menestheus, Port Napier, Port Quebec and Southern Prince was not completed until October. Arrival of Town-class destroyers from the Destroyers for Bases Agreement provided escorts for the minelayers. The first minelaying mission left port ZA on 18 October 1940, and 10,300 conventional contact mines were laid at the southern end of the Iceland–Faeroes Ridge before the end of the year.

The Mk XX mine became available in early 1941 with a copper wire antenna extended 60 ft (18 m) above the explosive casing by a buoyant float and a lower antenna extending 74 ft (23 m) below the casing. Minelaying progressed with new fields laid north and south of the Faeroes and in the Denmark Strait using Mk XX mines wherever its 134 ft (41 m) depth coverage would reduce the number of mines required. Additional safety measures were required for the new mines after Menestheus was damaged by the detonation of a drifting Mk XX mine on 6 February 1941. Intelligence reports in July indicated that U-boats were using the Faeroes–Iceland passage, so a series of deep anti-submarine fields were laid north-west of the Faeroes.

1942 minelaying used a new Mk XXII mine with a buoyant copper tube upper antenna replacing the solid copper wire and buoyant float of the Mk XX mines. The minelaying cruiser HMS Adventure laid the first M Mk I moored magnetic mines and became a regular participant in the 1st Minelaying Squadron missions from May through November 1942. Portions of the Denmark Strait minefield damaged by ice were relaid with M Mk I moored magnetic mines.

Date	Operation	Location	Minelayers
October 1940	SN3	Iceland–Faeroes Ridge	HMS Agamemnon, Menestheus, Port Napier, Port Quebec and Southern Prince
November 1940	SN11	southern Iceland–Faeroes Ridge	Agamemnon, Menestheus, and Port Quebec; Port Napier exploded in port ZA
December 1940	SN10A	southern Iceland–Faeroes Ridge	Agamemnon and Menestheus
January 1941	SN6	south of Faeroes	Agamemnon, Menestheus, Port Quebec and Southern Prince
January 1941	SN65	south of Faeroes	Agamemnon, Menestheus, Port Quebec and Southern Prince
February 1941	SN7A		Port Quebec and Southern Prince, Menestheus damaged by Mk XX mine, towed to port ZA by Agamemnon
February 1941	SN7B & SN68A		Agamemnon, Port Quebec and Southern Prince
March 1941	SN4	Iceland–Faeroes Ridge	Agamemnon, Menestheus, Port Quebec and Southern Prince; Agamemnon damaged by collision with HMS Castleton on return voyage
April 1941	SN71	Denmark Strait	Menestheus, Port Quebec and Southern Prince
April 1941	SN8	Denmark Strait	Agamemnon, Menestheus, Port Quebec and Southern Prince
May 1941	SN9	Iceland–Faeroes Ridge	Agamemnon, Menestheus and Port Quebec
June 1941	SN64	North Rona area	Agamemnon and Menestheus
June 1941	SN66		Agamemnon and Menestheus
June 1941	SN70B	Iceland–Faeroes Ridge	Agamemnon and Menestheus; collision, HMS Kenya and Brighton
July 1941	SN67A	Iceland–Faeroes Ridge	Agamemnon, Menestheus and Port Quebec
July 1941	SN12A	north-west of Sula Sgeir	HMS Teviot Bank
August 1941	SN22B	Butt of Lewis	Agamemnon
August 1941	SN70A	Butt of Lewis	Menestheus, Port Quebec and Southern Prince; Southern Prince torpedoed U-652 returning
September 1941	SN61	North Rona area	Agamemnon
September 1941	SN23	Butt of Lewis	Port Quebec
October 1941	SN24	Butt of Lewis	Port Quebec
October 1941	SN83A	northern Faeroes gap	HMS Welshman, Menestheus and Port Quebec
November 1941	SN83B	northern Faeroes gap	Menestheus and Port Quebec
November 1941	SN25	north-west approaches	Menestheus
January 1942	SN26	Butt of Lewis	Agamemnon
February 1942	SN5B	Faeroes fjords	Agamemnon and Menestheus
February 1942	SN84	Iceland–Faeroes Ridge	Agamemnon, Menestheusand Port Quebec
February 1942	SN85	Iceland–Faeroes Ridge	Agamemnon, Menestheus, Port Quebec and Southern Prince
March 1942	SN81	Iceland–Faeroes Ridge	Agamemnon, Menestheus, Port Quebec and Southern Prince
March 1942	SN87	Iceland–Faeroes Ridge	Agamemnon, Menestheus, Port Quebec and Southern Prince
April 1942	SN88	Iceland–Faeroes Ridge	Agamemnon, Menestheus, Port Quebec and Southern Prince
May 1942	SN3A	Faeroes shelf west of Orkney Islands	HMS Adventure, Agamemnon, Menestheus, Port Quebec and Southern Prince
June 1942	SN72	Denmark Strait	Adventure, Agamemnon, Menestheus, Port Quebec and Southern Prince
June 1942	SN3B	Faeroes shelf west of Orkney Islands	Adventure, Agamemnon, Menestheus, Port Quebec and Southern Prince
July 1942	SN3C	Faeroes shelf west of Orkney Islands	Adventure, Agamemnon, Menestheus, Port Quebec and Southern Prince
July 1942	SN82	Iceland–Faeroes Ridge	Adventure, Agamemnon, Menestheus, Port Quebec and Southern Prince
August 1942	SN73	Denmark Strait	Adventure, Agamemnon, Menestheus, Port Quebec and Southern Prince
September 1942	SN89	Iceland–Faeroes Ridge	Adventure, Agamemnon, Menestheus, Port Quebec and Southern Prince
September 1942	SN65A	Iceland–Faeroes Ridge	Adventure, Agamemnon, Menestheus, Port Quebec and Southern Prince
October 1942	SN3E	Faeroes shelf west of Orkney Islands	Adventure, Agamemnon, Menestheus, Port Quebec and Southern Prince
November 1942	SN3F	Faeroes shelf west of Orkney Islands	Adventure, Agamemnon, Menestheus, Port Quebec and Southern Prince
March 1943	SN90A	west of Iceland	Agamemnon, Menestheus and Port Quebec
May 1943	SN111A	off Iceland	Agamemnon, Menestheus and Port Quebec
May 1943	SN123A	Butt of Lewis	Agamemnon, experimental field, modified M Mark I Mines
May 1943	SN123B	Butt of Lewis	Agamemnon, Menestheus and Port Quebec lay experimental field
June 1943	SN123C	Butt of Lewis	Agamemnon, Menestheus and Port Quebec lay experimental field
June 1943	SN222A	south-east of Iceland	Agamemnon, Menestheus and Port Quebec
August 1943	SN74	Denmark Strait	Agamemnon, Menestheus and Port Quebec
September 1943	SN222B	south-east of Iceland	Agamemnon, Menestheus and Port Quebec
September 1943	SN222C	south-east of Iceland	Agamemnon, Menestheus and Port Quebec

In fog on 5 July 1942 HMS Niger mistook an iceberg for Iceland’s North Western Cape and led six merchant ships of Murmansk to Reykjavík convoy QP 13 into minefield SN72 laid one month earlier at the entrance to the Denmark Strait. Every ship struck mines. There were no crewmen lost aboard the Soviet freighter Rodina (4441 GRT), the Panamanian-flagged freighter Exterminator (6115 GRT), or the American freighter Hybert (6120 GRT); but 46 civilian crew and 9 Naval Armed Guards died aboard the American Liberty ship John Randolph (7191 GRT) and freighters Hefron (7611 GRT) and Massmar (5825 GRT); and there were only eight survivors of the 127 men aboard Niger. Only Exterminator could be salvaged. The value of the Northern Barrage was questioned following the accident, though new fields were laid south of Iceland, before starting new deep fields on the Faeroes shelf.

== Cancelled ==
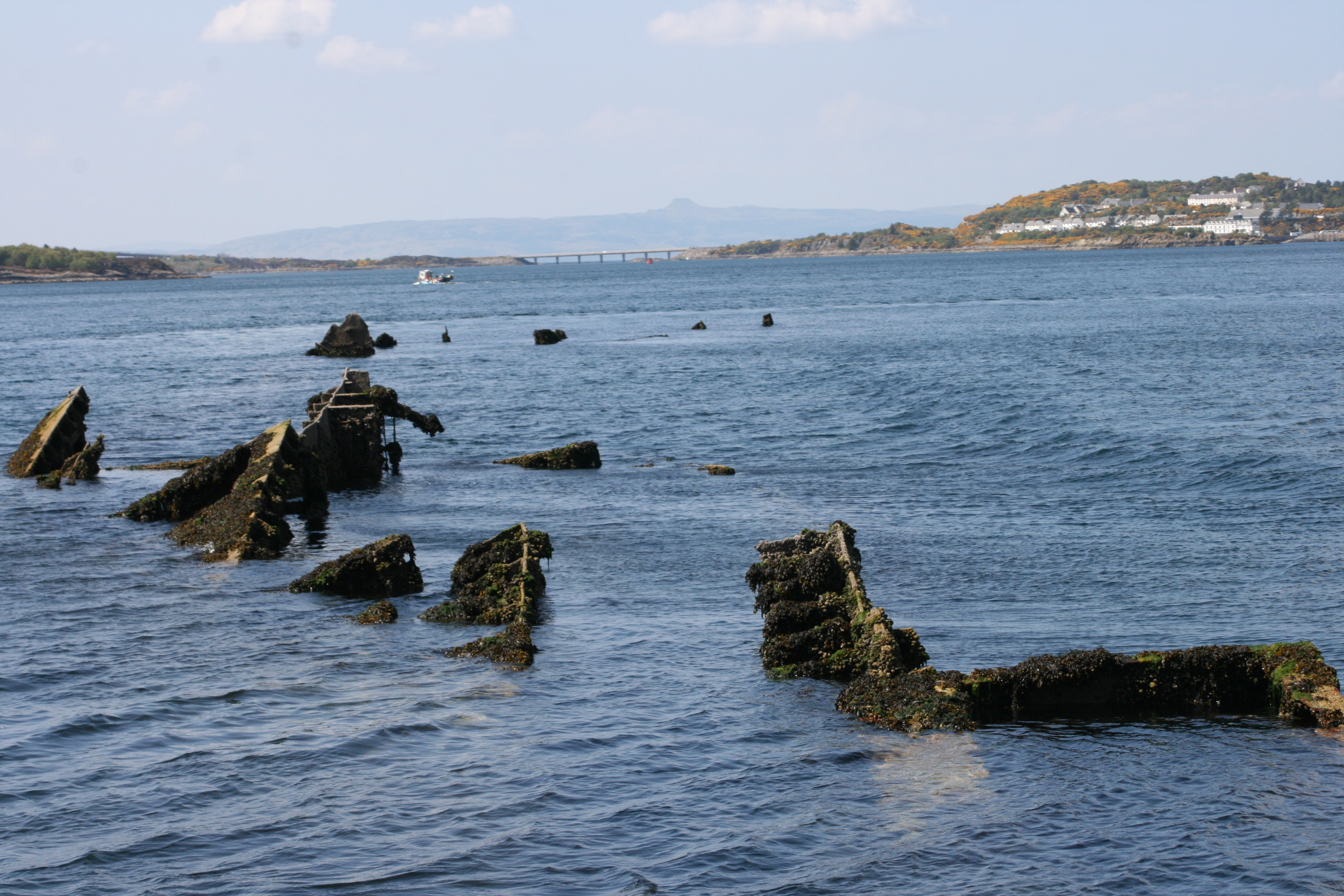
The shattered frame of HMS Port Napier remains visible where the minelayer exploded preparing to leave the first Minelaying Squadron's base at Port ZA.

The future of the Northern Barrage was discussed by the Admiralty at meetings in January and July 1943. Escorts allocated to protecting the minelayers had created a shortage of convoy escorts. The barrage had proved difficult to maintain and there were no survivors to verify sinking of U-boats by the northern mine barrage; although it may have claimed several whose loss has not been otherwise explained, including U-104 in November 1940, U-702 in March 1942, U-253 in September 1942, U-647 in July 1943 and U-855 in September 1944. The Allies were unaware of these U-boat losses and attributed most of them to Allied ship and aircraft attacks after the Commander-in-Chief of the Home Fleet declared the Northern Barrage "the least profitable voluntary major undertaking of the war".

The programme was cancelled and apart from the laying of an additional field at the entrance to the Denmark Strait, the only minelaying approved was a series of deep fields at the northern end of the Faeroes–Iceland gap. The First Minelaying Squadron was disbanded after laying 92,083 mines. The minefield represented 35 percent of all British minelaying effort during the war. The Northern Barrage had failed to justify its existence and had often been more dangerous to Allied forces than to the Germans. Afterwards more effort was deployed on offensive minelaying by submarines, motor launches and aircraft, which proved far more effective.

== Legacy ==
Not all of the mines were removed or destroyed during or following the war and unexploded mines have been discovered into the twenty-first century. Most of the steel shell has corroded unless protected by burial in anaerobic sediment; but the cast explosive charge may still be intact. The most commonly used mines included 227 kilograms (500 lb) or 137 kilograms (302 lb) of explosives. TNT was the most commonly used explosive, although it was sometimes mixed with ammonium nitrate (forming Amatol) for economy and with powdered aluminum (forming Minol) to increase underwater damage.
