= Port Quebec =

Port Quebec or Port Québec may refer to:

- Port of Quebec, the port of Quebec City
- HMS Port Quebec
