= German submarine U-855 =

German World War II submarine

History

Nazi Germany
- Name: U-855
- Ordered: 5 June 1941
- Builder: DeSchiMAG AG Weser, Bremen
- Yard number: 1061
- Laid down: 21 October 1942
- Launched: 17 April 1943
- Commissioned: 2 August 1943
- Fate: Missing since 11 September 1944, probably sunk by mine in position 63°10′N 12°30′W on 17 September 1944

General characteristics
- Class & type: Type IXC/40 submarine
- Displacement: 1,144 t (1,126 long tons) surfaced; 1,257 t (1,237 long tons) submerged
- Length: 76.76 m (251 ft 10 in) o/a; 58.75 m (192 ft 9 in) pressure hull
- Beam: 6.86 m (22 ft 6 in) o/a; 4.44 m (14 ft 7 in) pressure hull
- Height: 9.60 m (31 ft 6 in)
- Draught: 4.67 m (15 ft 4 in)
- Installed power: 4,400 PS (3,200 kW; 4,300 bhp) (diesels); 1,000 PS (740 kW; 990 shp) (electric)
- Propulsion: 2 shafts; 2 × diesel engines; 2 × electric motors
- Speed: 19 knots (35 km/h; 22 mph) surfaced; 7.3 knots (13.5 km/h; 8.4 mph) submerged
- Range: 13,850 nmi (25,650 km; 15,940 mi) at 10 knots (19 km/h; 12 mph) surfaced; 63 nmi (117 km; 72 mi) at 4 knots (7.4 km/h; 4.6 mph) submerged
- Test depth: 230 m (750 ft)
- Complement: 4 officers, 44 enlisted
- Armament: 6 × torpedo tubes (4 bow, 2 stern); 22 × 53.3 cm (21 in) torpedoes; 1 × 10.5 cm (4.1 in) SK C/32 deck gun (180 rounds); 1 × 3.7 cm (1.5 in) SK C/30 AA gun; 1 × twin 2 cm FlaK 30 AA guns

Service record
- Part of: 4th U-boat Flotilla; 2 August 1943 – 31 March 1944; 10th U-boat Flotilla; 1 April – 11 September 1944
- Identification codes: M 53 689
- Commanders: Kptlt. Albert Sürenhagen; 2 August 1943 – 2 April 1944; Oblt.z.S. Prosper Ohlsen; 3 April – 11 September 1944
- Operations: 1 patrol: 1 July – 11 September 1944
- Victories: None

German submarine U-855 was a Type IXC/40 U-boat built for Nazi Germany's Kriegsmarine during World War II.

== Design ==
German Type IXC/40 submarines were slightly larger than the original Type IXCs. U-855 had a displacement of 1,144 tonnes (1,126 long tons) when at the surface and 1,257 tonnes (1,237 long tons) while submerged. The U-boat had a total length of 76.76 m (251 ft 10 in), a pressure hull length of 58.75 m (192 ft 9 in), a beam of 6.86 m (22 ft 6 in), a height of 9.60 m (31 ft 6 in), and a draught of 4.67 m (15 ft 4 in). The submarine was powered by two MAN M 9 V 40/46 supercharged four-stroke, nine-cylinder diesel engines producing a total of 4,400 metric horsepower (3,240 kW; 4,340 shp) for use while surfaced, two Siemens-Schuckert 2 GU 345/34 double-acting electric motors producing a total of 1,000 shaft horsepower (1,010 PS; 750 kW) for use while submerged. She had two shafts and two 1.92 m (6 ft) propellers. The boat was capable of operating at depths of up to 230 metres (750 ft).

The submarine had a maximum surface speed of 18.3 knots (33.9 km/h; 21.1 mph) and a maximum submerged speed of 7.3 knots (13.5 km/h; 8.4 mph). When submerged, the boat could operate for 63 nautical miles (117 km; 72 mi) at 4 knots (7.4 km/h; 4.6 mph); when surfaced, she could travel 13,850 nautical miles (25,650 km; 15,940 mi) at 10 knots (19 km/h; 12 mph). U-855 was fitted with six 53.3 cm (21 in) torpedo tubes (four fitted at the bow and two at the stern), 22 torpedoes, one 10.5 cm (4.13 in) SK C/32 naval gun, 180 rounds, and a 3.7 cm (1.5 in) SK C/30 as well as a 2 cm (0.79 in) C/30 anti-aircraft gun. The boat had a complement of forty-eight.

== Service history ==
U-855 was ordered on 5 June 1941 from DeSchiMAG AG Weser in Bremen under the yard number 1061. Her keel was laid down on 21 October 1942 and the U-boat was launched the following year on 17 April 1943. She was commissioned into service under the command of Kapitänleutnant Albert Sürenhagen (Crew 36) in 4th U-boat Flotilla.

On 3 April 1944 Sürenhagen handed over command to Oberleutnant zur See Prosper Ohlsen (Crew 36). U-855 transferred to the 10th U-boat Flotilla for front-line service and left Kiel for operations in the North Atlantic on 22 June 1944, but experienced engine problems which forced her to return to Kiel. The U-boat left Kiel again on 1 July and served as a weather boat in the North Atlantic until September 1944.

An attack on an unescorted freighter on 6 September 1944 was not successful. The next day U-855 met with U-516 and supplied her with provisions for twelve days. The following day, 9 September, she refuelled U-516 before making for port. Her last transmission was received on 11 September 1944, after that the U-boat was missing.

Since U-855 would have had to pass through known mine barrages about a week into her return voyage. Since she failed to report the successful passage, as other U-boats would do, she was probably sunk by a mine in the Northern Barrage on 17 October. That day another U-boat in the vicinity, U-804 reported hearing an explosion of a mine. The previous assumption that U-855 was attacked and sunk by a British aircraft, Liberator 'A' of No. 224 Squadron RAF, on 24 September is not correct as this attack damaged U-763.

== Bibliography ==
- Busch, Rainer; Röll, Hans-Joachim (1999). German U-boat commanders of World War II: a biographical dictionary. Translated by Brooks, Geoffrey. London, Annapolis, Md: Greenhill Books, Naval Institute Press. ISBN 1-55750-186-6.
- Busch, Rainer; Röll, Hans-Joachim (1999). Der U-Boot-Krieg, 1939-1945: Deutsche U-Boot-Verluste von September 1939 bis Mai 1945 [German U-boat losses from September 1939 to May 1945] (in German). Vol. IV. Hamburg, Berlin, Bonn: Mittler. ISBN 3-8132-0514-2.
- Gröner, Eric; Jung, Dieter; Maass, Martin (1991). German Warships 1815-1945: U-boats and Mine Warfare Vessels. Vol. 2. Translated by Thomas, Keith; Magowan, Rachel. London: Conway Maritime Press. ISBN 0-85177-593-4.
