= Quebecer =

Quebecer or Quebecker may refer to:

- Québécois people, a native or resident of the province of Quebec
- The Quebecers, a pro-wrestling team
- Quebecer, a native or inhabitant of Quebec City

== See also ==
- French Canadian
- Quebec (disambiguation)
- Québécois (disambiguation)
