= Québécois nation motion =

2006 Canadian parliamentary motion

The Québécois nation motion was a parliamentary motion tabled by Conservative Party leader and Prime Minister of Canada Stephen Harper on November 22, 2006, and approved by the House of Commons of Canada on November 27. It was approved 265–16 with supporters in every party in the Commons. The English motion read:

That this House recognize that the Québécois form a nation within a united Canada."

and, in French, read:

Que cette Chambre reconnaisse que les Québécoises et les Québécois forment une nation au sein d'un Canada uni."

== Historical background ==
The debate about Québécois nationhood centres on the question of the status of the province of Quebec and its primarily French-speaking population. During the Quiet Revolution of the 1960s, the term Québécois largely replaced French Canadian as an expression of cultural and nationalist identity as French Canadians asserted themselves culturally. The modern Québécois identity is secular and based on a social democratic ideal of the Quebec State promoting Quebec French culture and language in the arts, education, and business within the province. Politically, this resulted in a movement towards more provincial autonomy. Quebec federalists in the Liberal Party of Quebec argued for more autonomy within Canada, while Quebec sovereigntists, mostly within the Parti Québécois, argued for outright independence from Canada. Quebec nationalists increasingly referred to provincial institutions as being "national", changing the name of the provincial Legislative Assembly to National Assembly of Quebec in 1968 and referring to Quebec City as the "national capital", for example.

In response, the Liberal Party of Canada under Prime Minister Pierre Trudeau advocated an increased role for French-speaking Canadians in the federal government through a policy of Official Bilingualism, a federal presence in social programs that sought to create a unified Canadian identity that resisted demands for more provincial autonomy, and a new constitution based on individual rights that would sever the remaining colonial ties to Britain. This alienated many Quebec nationalists who demanded legal, constitutional recognition of the collective cultural identity in Quebec.

The conflict culminated in the Parti Québécois government of René Lévesque holding a province-wide referendum on Sovereignty-Association in 1980 that proposed that Quebec would assume all federal powers while maintaining economic links to Canada; it was rejected by 60% of Quebecers. Prime Minister Pierre Trudeau subsequently pushed through the amendment of the constitution with the Canada Act 1982. This was done with the approval of the other provincial governments, but not the government of Quebec.

In 1987, the Progressive Conservative government of Prime Minister Brian Mulroney negotiated the Meech Lake Accord with the federalist government of Robert Bourassa. It recognized Quebec as a "distinct society" within Canada. All provinces originally agreed, but Manitoba and Newfoundland failed to ratify the accord, amid vocal criticism of the accord from Pierre Trudeau. In April 1988, Manitoba voters elected a Conservative minority government, but the leader holding the 'balance of power' in the minority government, Liberal leader Sharon Carstairs, stood opposed to the Accord. In April 1989, Newfoundland voters elected a Liberal majority government, led by Premier Clyde Wells, who held a second vote in the legislature that rescinded Newfoundland's support for the agreement in April 1990. In June 1990, the Manitoba government was unable to even vote on the accord, due to a procedural vote (requiring unanimity) that was brought down by one Aboriginal New Democratic Party MLA, Elijah Harper. First Nation groups and the populist Reform Party in Western Canada also opposed the accord, arguing that their cultural and regional grievances were being ignored.

The failure of the Meech Lake Accord generated a backlash in Quebec. Support for sovereignty soared to above 60%, and the sovereigntist Bloc Québécois formed under disaffected Progressive Conservative Cabinet Minister Lucien Bouchard. The Bloc represented the majority of Quebec in the federal Parliament between the 1993 federal election and the Canadian federal election of 2011. However, the federal Liberal Party of Jean Chrétien won power in 1993 by sweeping Ontario and picking up votes in all provinces. They advocated the status-quo on constitutional issues. The conservative Reform Party under Preston Manning displaced the Progressive Conservatives in the Western provinces, and advocated a constitutional reform that would recognize all provinces as equal, opposing special legal status for Quebec. The Progressive Conservative were reduced to two seats. A Parti Québécois government held another referendum on sovereignty and a "partnership" with Canada in 1995 and lost by only a few thousand votes. A major theme of popular sovereigntist leader Lucien Bouchard the referendum was that English Canada did not recognize the Quebec people in the constitution, depicting it as an English Canadian humiliation of French Quebec.

Following the referendum, support for Quebec sovereignty decreased. The Parti Québécois government renewed the push for recognition as a nation through symbolic motions that gained the support of all parties in the National Assembly. They affirmed the right to determine the independent status of Quebec.

They also renamed the area around Quebec City the Capitale nationale (national capital) region and renamed provincial parks Parcs nationaux (national parks). In opposition in October 2003, a Parti Québécois motion was unanimously adopted in the National Assembly of Quebec in 2003 that recognized the Quebec people as "forming a nation".

== Evolution of motion ==
During the 2006 Liberal Party of Canada leadership election, when describing his vision for Canada, leading candidate and academic Michael Ignatieff wrote an op-ed in Maclean's on September 1 where he defended the idea that Quebec should be considered a nation by stating that it is a civic not an ethnic nation. Ignatieff suggested that Quebec as well as Indigenous communities should be recognized as nations within the fabric of Canada. When the Quebec wing of the federal Liberals adopted a resolution on October 21 recognizing that Quebec was a nation, many Liberals began questioning Ignatieff's judgement. Justin Trudeau, son of Pierre Trudeau, criticized Ignatieff for lacking political judgement. Stéphane Dion, the lone Quebec leadership candidate criticized Ignatieff for not considering all the ramifications and complications.

Sensing political division in his political opposition, Bloc Québécois leader Gilles Duceppe scheduled a motion in the House of Commons for November 23, 2006—similar to the 2003 Parti Québécois resolution passed unanimously by the National Assembly of Quebec—that it also recognize "Quebeckers as a nation". He knew that the motion would probably be rejected, but argued he could use this to show that Canadians once again did not recognize the identity of Quebecers. If the motion did pass, he could use it to make claims on Quebec sovereignty.

Dion eventually won the Liberal leadership and moved to reconcile positions within the Liberal party, circulating a draft of a resolution that would have changed the wording of the resolution.

On November 22, 2006, the Conservative Prime Minister Stephen Harper tabled the Québécois nation motion the day before the Bloc Québécois resolution came to a vote. The English version changed the word Quebecer to Québécois and added "within a united Canada" at the end of the Bloc motion. Harper further elaborated, stating that the motion's definition of Québécois relies on personal decisions to self-identify as Québécois, and therefore is a personal choice. Dion said that this resolution was similar to the one he had circulated several days earlier. The Bloc Québécois members originally rejected this motion as overly partisan and federalist, but supported the motion the following day.

== Vote in the House of Commons ==
The House of Commons voted overwhelmingly to pass the motion. The motion passed by a margin of 265 (yeas) to 16 (nays). At that time, there were 308 seats in the House of Commons, but two were vacant. Of the rest, 283 MPs voted on the motion, 20 were absent for various reasons, three chose to abstain and two had pre-arranged to be paired with absent voters (not counting their votes). MPs then voted down the Bloc Québécois motion.

Conservative members were ordered by the Prime Minister not to oppose the motion or be expelled from the caucus. Many of his MPs had deep reservations about the motion, but only six members of his caucus were absent, all from Western Canada. Harper's Intergovernmental Affairs minister Michael Chong resigned from his position and abstained from voting, arguing that this motion was too ambiguous and had the potential of recognizing ethnic nationalism in Canada.

Members of the New Democratic Party and Bloc Québécois all voted for the motion. Liberals were the most divided on the issue and comprised 15 of the 16 votes against the motion. Liberal MP Ken Dryden summarized the view of many of these dissenters, maintaining that it was a game of semantics that cheapened issues of national identity.

== Popular support ==
A survey of 1,500 Canadians by Leger Marketing for the Association of Canadian studies in November 2006 showed that Canadians were deeply divided on this issue, though polls used wording that did not directly reflect the motion. When asked if "Quebecers" are a nation, only 48 per cent of Canadians agreed, 47 per cent disagreed, with 33 per cent strongly disagreeing; 78 per cent of French-speaking Quebecers agreed that "Quebecers" are a nation, next to 38 per cent of English-speakers. As well, 78 per cent of 1,000 Quebecers polled thought that "Quebecers" should be recognized as a nation.

== Subsequent events ==
A few months after his election in 2015, Prime Minister, Justin Trudeau advocated to the Assembly of First Nations a "nation-to-nation" relationship with Indigenous peoples is rooted in a policy framework built on recognition of rights, respect, co-operation, and partnership. During the 2016 Parti Québécois leadership race, candidate Jean-François Lisée asked Trudeau to clarify his position on this subject due to Harper motion. Trudeau acknowledged "Canada is a nation; Quebec is a nation."

In 2021, François Legault's Coalition Avenir Québec government in Quebec proposed to amend the Charter of the French Language and the provincial constitution to more strongly entrench French as the sole official language. In response to this, the Bloc Québécois initiated a motion in the House of Commons endorsing the constitutionality of Legault's initiatives and reasserting Quebecers' nationhood. The Commons passed the motion 281–2, with 36 abstentions.

That the House agree that Section 45 of the Constitution Act, 1982, grants Quebec and the provinces exclusive jurisdiction to amend their respective constitutions and acknowledge the will of Quebec to enshrine in its constitution that Quebecers form a nation, that French is the only official language of Quebec and that it is also the common language of the Quebec nation.
