= HMS Scott (J79) =

Minesweeper of the Royal Navy

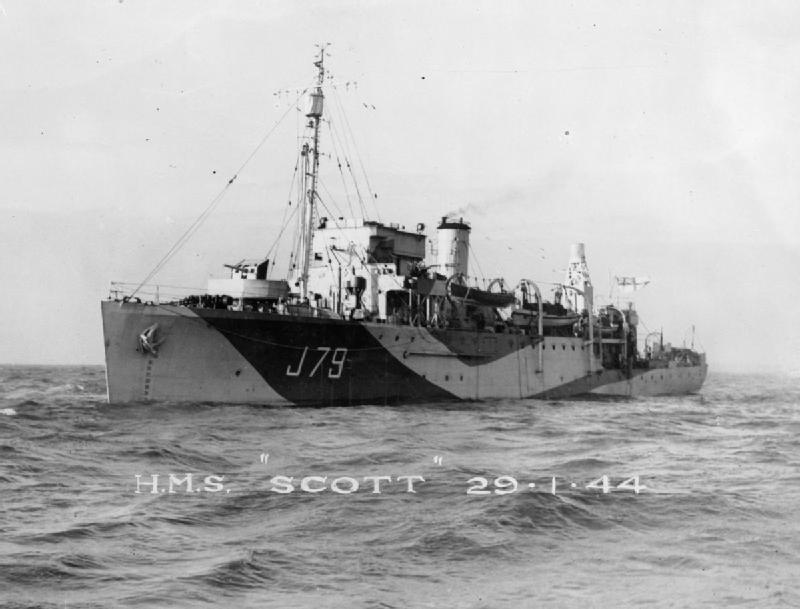
- HMS Scott, 1944

History

United Kingdom
- Name: HMS Scott
- Namesake: Robert Falcon Scott
- Builder: Caledon Shipbuilding & Engineering Company, Dundee
- Laid down: 30 August 1937
- Launched: 23 August 1938
- Completed: 23 February 1939
- Fate: Scrapped, 1965

General characteristics
- Class & type: Halcyon-class minesweeper
- Displacement: 875 long tons (889 t) standard; 1,350 long tons (1,372 t) full load
- Length: 245 ft 9 in (74.90 m) o/a
- Beam: 33 ft 6 in (10.21 m)
- Draught: 8 ft (2.4 m)
- Propulsion: 2 × Admiralty 3-drum water-tube boilers; Parsons steam turbines; 1,750 shp (1,300 kW) on 2 shafts
- Speed: 17 knots (31 km/h; 20 mph)
- Complement: 80

HMS Scott (J79) was a Halcyon-class minesweeper (officially, "fleet minesweeping sloop") of the British Royal Navy completed as an unarmed survey ship with an enlarged bridge and a large chart room abaft the extended forecastle deck. She served through World War II and the two following decades.

== Service history ==
=== World War II ===
Scott surveyed the English Channel in 1939 in preparation for laying a Channel Mine Barrage, and directed minelayers laying the barrage immediately following declaration of war. She was equipped for anti-submarine escort assignments when the Channel minelaying was completed, but retained the chart room by sacrificing her mainmast to compensate for the additional topside weight of a QF 12 pounder 12 cwt naval gun on the forecastle. By the spring of 1940 her assignments were refocused on minelaying surveys rather than escort work. She measured depth of water with tidal fluctuations and currents to determine suitable minefield locations.

In May 1941 Scott narrowly avoided detection by the German battleship Bismarck while surveying Greenland pack ice in the Denmark Strait. She was damaged in a collision with HMS Arethusa in December 1941 while assisting the British Commando raid Operation Anklet on the Lofoten Islands.

After the collision damage was repaired, Scott focused on providing navigational information for the minelayers placing the Northern Barrage between Greenland and Scotland from the spring of 1942 until the project was abandoned in the autumn of 1943. She surveyed the minefields in advance, and then accompanied the minelayers while the fields were placed.

After testing the Decca Navigator System at Moray Firth in early 1944, Scott surveyed positions for the blockships and Phoenix breakwaters of the Mulberry harbour at Arromanches during the Invasion of Normandy. She then surveyed liberated harbours including Morlaix, Boulogne, Brest, Dunkirk and Antwerp; and surveyed locations for the cross-channel pipelines of Operation Pluto.

=== Post-war service ===
Scott was deployed in June 1960 to map shipwrecks from both World Wars in the English Channel after the arrival of giant tankers. The requirements of those ships changed the minimum of clearance between their hulls and the wrecks below.

Scott completed two decades of peacetime hydrographic duties in Home Waters before being retired in 1964 and scrapped in 1965. She located and swept many war-time wrecks while re-surveying coastal Great Britain. Her work was continued by Hecla class survey vessels which have, in turn, been replaced by a new HMS Scott.
