= HMCS Quebec =

List of ships with the same or similar names

Several Canadian naval units have been named HMCS Quebec.

- HMCS Quebec (C66) (I) was a Crown Colony-class cruiser commissioned in the Royal Navy as HMS Uganda (C66) during World War II and later transferred to the Royal Canadian Navy as HMCS Uganda (C66). She was reactivated by the RCN from 1952 to 1956 and renamed HMCS Quebec.
- CSTC HMCS Quebec (II) was a cadet summer training centre of the Royal Canadian Sea Cadets which carried the unit name until 2012.
- HMCS Quebec was a planned Canada-class submarine cancelled in 1989

== See also ==
- HMCS Ville de Québec
- HMS Quebec, Royal Navy ships and bases of the name
- HMS Port Quebec
