= HMS Southern Prince =

Motor ship that was a British reefer ship, WW2 minelayer, and Italian passenger ship

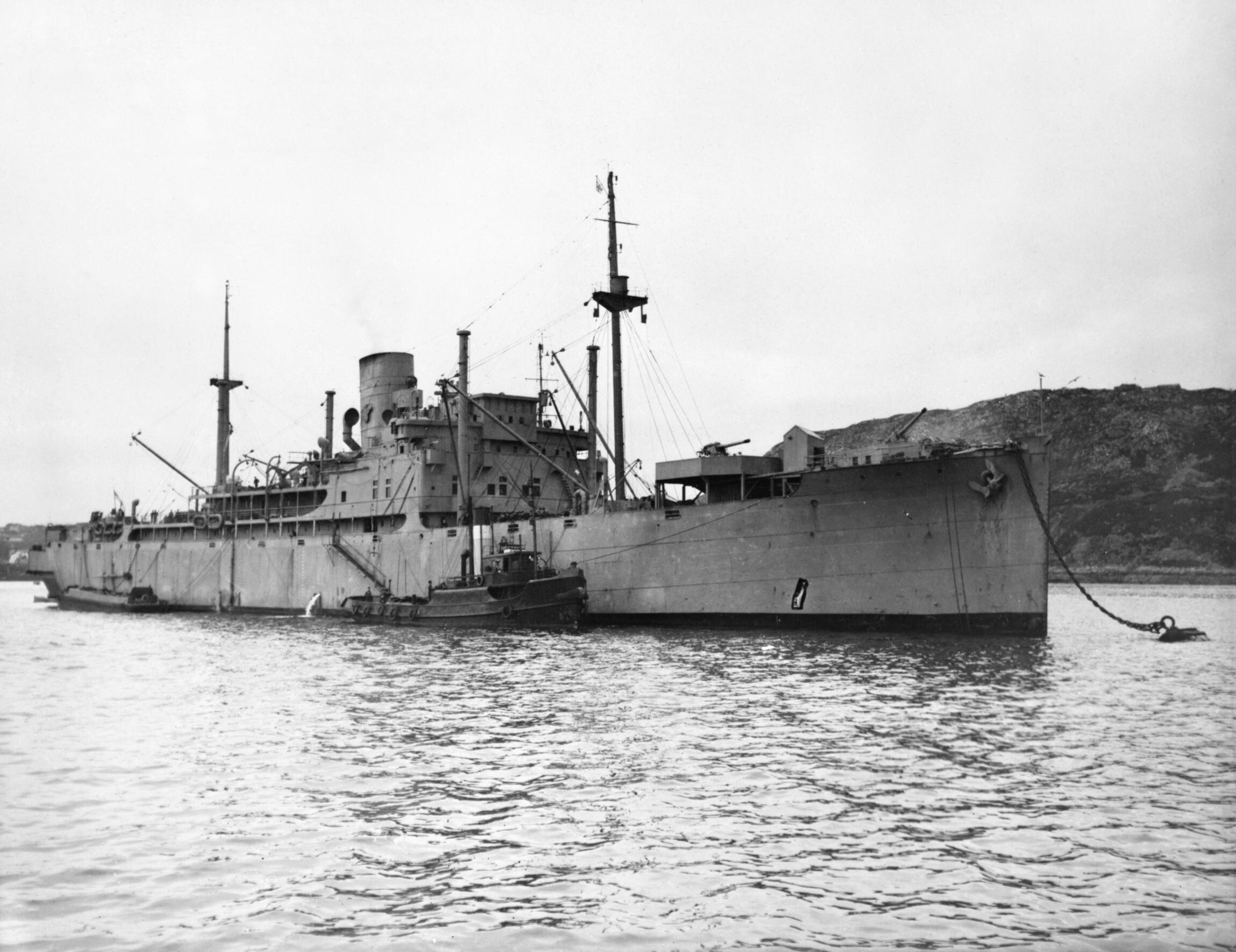
- HMS Southern Prince at Kyle of Lochalsh

History
- Name: 1929: Southern Prince; 1947: Anna C
- Owner: 1929: Prince Line; 1946: Ministry of Transport; 1947: Giacomo Costa fu Andrea; 1969: Costa Armatori SpA
- Operator: 1929: Furness, Withy; 1940: (United Kingdom) Royal Navy
- Port of registry: 1929: (United Kingdom) London; 1947: (Italy) Genoa
- Builder: Lithgows, Port Glasgow
- Yard number: 816
- Launched: 12 March 1929
- Completed: August 1929
- Acquired: requisitioned 16 December 1939
- Commissioned: into Royal Navy, 15 June 1940
- Decommissioned: from Royal Navy, April 1947
- Identification: UK official number 161277; 1929–33: code letters LDQJ; 1930–47: call sign GTCW; 1940–: pennant number M47; 1947–72: call sign ICKA
- Honours and awards: Normandy 1944
- Fate: Scrapped in 1972

General characteristics
- Type: 1929: refrigerated cargo ship; 1940: minelayer; 1944: headquarters ship; 1944: accommodation ship; 1945: training ship; 1947: passenger ship; 1952: cruise ship
- Tonnage: 1930: 10,917 GRT, 6,501 NRT; 1947: 11,447 GRT, 3,560 NRT; 1953: 11,736 GRT, 6,803 NRT
- Length: 496.2 ft (151.2 m)
- Beam: 64.9 ft (19.8 m)
- Draught: 26 ft 6 in (8.08 m)
- Depth: 35.4 ft (10.8 m)
- Decks: 3
- Installed power: as built: 2,200 NHP
- Propulsion: 2 × screws; as built: 2 × 4-stroke diesels; 1953: 2 × 2-stroke diesels
- Speed: 17 knots (31 km/h)
- Capacity: 148,583 cu ft (4,207 m^{3}) refrigerated cargo space
- Sensors & processing systems: as built: wireless direction finding, submarine signalling.; by 1947: gyrocompass; by 1959: radar
- Armament: 2 × 4-inch guns; 2 × 2-pounder guns; 7 × Oerlikon 20 mm cannons; 4 × 0.5-inch machine guns; 556 × mines
- Notes: sister ships: Northern Prince, Eastern Prince, Western Prince

HMS Southern Prince was a motor ship that was built in 1929 as the refrigerated cargo ship Southern Prince. She was commissioned into the Royal Navy in 1940 as a minelayer. She became a headquarters ship and then an accommodation ship in 1944, was a fleet training ship in 1945, and returned to civilian trade in 1946. In 1947 she was sold to Italian owners who had her refitted as a passenger ship and renamed her Anna C. From 1952 she was a cruise ship. She was scrapped in 1972.

This was the first of two Prince Line ships to be called Southern Prince. The second was a general cargo ship that was launched in 1955, sold and renamed in 1971, and scrapped in 1978.

== Building and identification ==
In 1928 and 1929 Prince Line, part of the Furness, Withy shipping group, had four large refrigerated cargo ships built by two Clydeside shipyards. Lithgows at Port Glasgow built Northern Prince and Southern Prince, and Napier and Miller in Old Kilpatrick built their sister ships Eastern Prince and Western Prince.

Lithgows built Southern Prince as yard number 816. She was launched on 12 March 1929 and completed that August. Her registered length was 496.2 ft (151.2 m), her beam was 64.9 ft (19.8 m) and her depth was 35.4 ft (10.8 m). Her tonnages were 10,917 GRT and 6,501 NRT, and she had 148,583 cu ft (4,207 m^{3}) of refrigerated cargo space.

Southern Prince had twin screws, driven by a pair of eight-cylinder, double-acting, four-stroke diesel engines built by John G. Kincaid & Company of Greenock. Between them, her twin engines were rated at 2,200 NHP and gave her a speed of 17 knots (31 km/h).

Prince Line registered Southern Prince in London. Her UK official number was 161277, and until 1933 her code letters were LDQJ. From 1930 her wireless telegraph call sign was GTCW. Prince Line employed her on its route between New York and Argentina.

== Minelayer ==
The Admiralty requisitioned Southern Prince on 16 December 1939. She was converted into an auxiliary minelayer, with capacity to carry and lay 556 mines. She was armed with two QF 4-inch naval gun Mk V, two QF 2-pounder naval guns, seven Oerlikon 20 mm cannons and four Vickers .50 machine guns. She was commissioned into the Royal Navy on 15 June 1940, with the pennant number M47.

By mid-August 1940 Southern Prince had joined the 1st Minelaying Squadron at Kyle of Lochalsh (Port ZA), along with four other auxiliary minesweepers, and an escort of destroyers. She was the largest and swiftest auxiliary minesweeper in the squadron. She and other ships of the flotilla started laying the Northern Barrage.

On the night of 25–26 August 1941, Southern Prince and other members of the flotilla were between Iceland and the Faroe Islands, returning in convoy from laying minefield SN-70A. At 0044 hrs U-652 fired a spread of three torpedoes at Southern Prince at position 62°55′N 09°55′W. One torpedo hit her amidships near her bridge, but she stayed afloat. At 0053 hrs U-652 fired a fourth torpedo, but it missed. The destroyers HMS Lightning and Lamerton came from Scapa Flow and escorted the damaged ship to The Minch.

Southern Prince had been repaired and returned to service by the end of February 1942, when she and other members of the flotilla were laying minefield SN85 between the Faroes and Iceland. The Northern Barrage was completed in September 1943.

== Later naval service ==
In June 1944 Southern Prince was Rear Admiral Rivett-Carnac's headquarters ship in the Normandy landings. She left The Solent on 7 June 1944 with Convoy EWP-1, and anchored off Juno Beach the next day.

After October 1944 Southern Prince was an accommodation ship. By the end of the war in 1945 she was a training ship in the Pacific.

== Anna C. ==
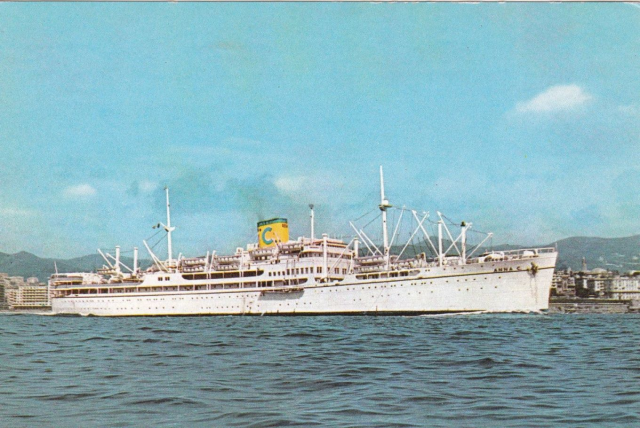
Anna C. as a Costa cruise ship in 1959

In 1946, ownership of Southern Prince was transferred from Prince Line to the Ministry of Transport. In April 1947 she was returned to her owners, who then sold her on to Giacomo Costa fu Andrea. Costa renamed her Anna C. and registered her in Genoa. Her Italian call sign was ICKA. Costa put her in passenger service between Italy and South America.

In 1952 Anna C. was refitted as a cruise ship. In her refit, her original engines were replaced with a pair of nine-cylinder, single-acting, two-stroke diesel engines built by FIAT. By 1959 her navigation equipment included radar.

In 1971 a serious fire damaged the ship. She was scrapped at La Spezia in the second quarter of 1972.

== Bibliography ==
- Burrell, David (1992). Furness Withy 1891–1991. Kendal: World Ship Society. ISBN 0-905617-70-3.
- Lenton, HT; Colledge, JJ (1968). British and Dominion Warships of World War II. Garden City, NY: Doubleday & Co.
- "List of vessels fitted with refrigerating appliances". Lloyd's Register of Shipping (PDF). Vol. I.–Steamers and Motorships Under 300 Tons, Trawlers, Tugs, Dredgers, etc. London: Lloyd's Register of Shipping. 1930 – via Southampton City Council.
- Lloyd's Register of Shipping (PDF). Vol. II.–Steamers and Motorships of 300 Tons Gross and Over. London: Lloyd's Register of Shipping. 1930 – via Southampton City Council.
- Lloyd's Register of Shipping. Vol. Steamers and Motorships of 300 Tons Gross and Over. London: Lloyd's Register of Shipping. 1947 – via Internet Archive.
- Mercantile Navy List. London. 1930 – via Crew List Index Project.
- Register Book. Vol. I A–L. London: Lloyd's Register of Shipping. 1953 – via Internet Archive.
- Register Book. Vol. I – Register of Ships. London: Lloyd's Register of Shipping. 1959 – via Internet Archive.
- Rohwer, Jürgen (2005). Chronology of the War at Sea 1939–1945: The Naval History of World War Two (Third Revised ed.). Annapolis, MD: Naval Institute Press. ISBN 1-59114-119-2.
