= HMS Quebec =

List of ships with the same or similar names

Three ships and a shore establishment of the Royal Navy have borne the name HMS Quebec, after the city of Quebec in Canada:

== Ships ==
- HMS Quebec (1760) was a 32-gun fifth rate launched in 1760 and blown up in action with French in 1779.
- HMS Quebec (1775) was a schooner purchased in 1775 and wrecked later that year.
- HMS Quebec (1781) was a 32-gun fifth rate launched in 1781 and broken up in 1816.

== Shore establishments ==
- HMS Quebec (shore establishment) was a combined training centre (No 1 CTC) at Inveraray, Scotland, between 1940 and 1946. Now Argyll Caravan Site.
- HMS Quebec II was the headquarters of the commanding officer of the northern patrol and Combined Operations Staff Officer Training Centre at Hollywood Hotel in Largs (North Ayrshire, Scotland) between 1941 and 1942.

== See also ==
- HMCS Quebec
- HMCS Ville de Quebec
- HMS Port Quebec, subsequently HMS Deer Sound, originally MV Port Quebec
