= Québécois people =

Residents of Quebec, Canada

Québécois (French pronunciation: [kebekwa]; also known as Quebecers or Quebeckers in English) are people associated with Quebec. The term is most often used in reference to either descendants of the French settlers in Quebec or people of any ethnicity who live and trace their origins to the province of Quebec.

Self-identification as Québécois became dominant starting in the 1960s; prior to this, the francophone people of Quebec mostly identified themselves as French Canadians and as Canadiens before anglophones started identifying as Canadians as well. A majority in the House of Commons of Canada in 2006 approved a motion by Prime Minister Stephen Harper, which stated that the Québécois are a nation within a united Canada. Harper later elaborated that the motion's definition of Québécois relies on personal decisions to self-identify as Québécois, and therefore is a personal choice.

== Nomenclature ==
Québécois (pronounced [kebekwa]); feminine: Québécoise (pronounced [kebekwaz]), Quebecois (fem.: Quebecoise), or Québecois (fem.: Québecoise) is a word used primarily to refer to a French-speaking inhabitant of the Canadian province of Quebec. Sometimes, it is used more generally to refer to any inhabitant of Quebec. It can refer to French spoken in Quebec. It may also be used, with an upper- or lower-case initial, as an adjective relating to Quebec, or to the French-Canadian culture of Quebec. A resident or native of Quebec is often referred to in English as a Quebecer or Quebecker. In French, Québécois or Québécoise usually refers to any native or resident of Quebec. Its use became more prominent in the 1960s as French Canadians from Quebec increasingly self-identified as Québécois.

=== English usage ===
English expressions employing the term may imply specific reference to francophones; examples include "Québécois music","a Québécois rocker" or "Québécois literature".

=== Ethnic designation in French ===
==== Dictionaries ====
The dictionary Le Petit Robert, published in France, states that the adjective québécois, in addition to its territorial meaning, may refer specifically to francophone or French Canadian culture in Quebec. The dictionary gives as examples cinéma québécois and littérature québécoise.

However, an ethnic or linguistic sense is absent from Le Petit Larousse, also published in France, as well as from French dictionaries published in Canada such as Le Dictionnaire québécois d'aujourd'hui and Le Dictionnaire du français Plus, which indicate instead Québécois francophone "francophone Quebecer" in the linguistic sense.

The online dictionary Grand dictionnaire terminologique of the Office québécois de la langue française mentions only a territorial meaning for Québécois.

==== Other opinion ====
Newspaper editor Lysiane Gagnon has referred to an ethnic sense of the word Québécois in both English and French.

== Etymology ==
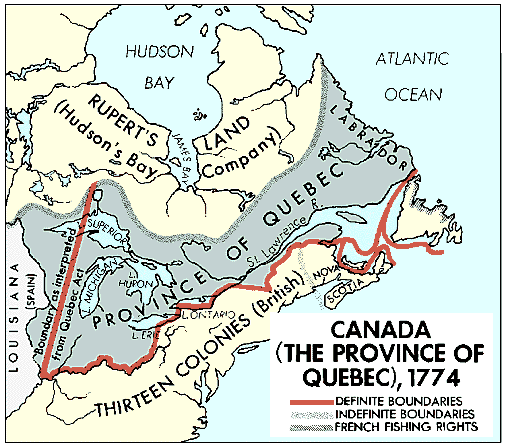
Province of Quebec 1774

The name Québec comes from an Algonquin word meaning 'narrow passage' or 'strait'. The name originally referred to the area around Quebec City where the Saint Lawrence River narrows to a cliff-lined gap. French explorer Samuel de Champlain chose this name in 1608 for the colonial outpost he would use as the administrative seat for the French colony of Canada and New France. The Province of Quebec was first founded as a British colony in the Royal Proclamation of 1763 after the Treaty of Paris formally transferred the French colony of New France to Britain after the Seven Years' War. Quebec City remained the capital. In 1774, Guy Carleton obtained from the British Government the Quebec Act, which gave Canadiens most of the territory they held before 1763; the right of religion; and their right of language and culture. The British Government did this to in order to keep their loyalty, in the face of a growing menace of independence from the 13 original British colonies.

== Québécois as an ethnicity ==
As shown by the 2016 Statistics Canada census, 58.3% of residents of Quebec identify their ethnicity as Canadian, (Note: English-language questionnaires listed this ethnicity as Canadian, while French-language questionnaires used Canadien.) 23.5% as French and 0.4% as Acadian. Roughly 2.3% of residents, or 184,005 people, describe their ethnicity as Québécois.

In the 2021 census, 982,000 people reported identifying as being of Québécois ethnic or cultural origin, representing roughly 11.2% of the province's population.

Number	Language	Beliefs	Related Groups
184,005	French, English	Roman Catholicism, Atheism, Agnosticism, Protestantism	Canadian, Canadien, French

== Québécois identity ==
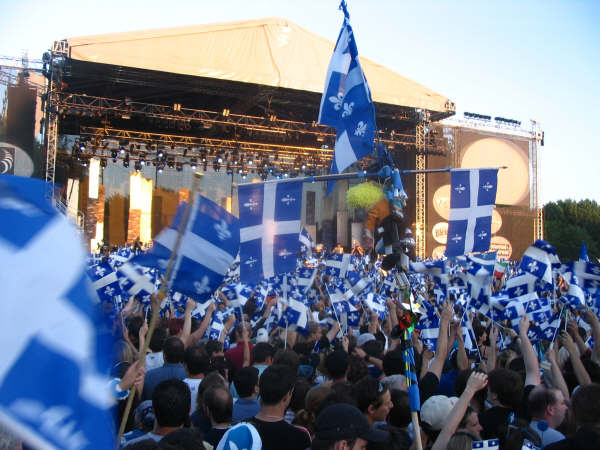
Fête Nationale du Québec (or Saint-Jean-Baptiste Day) Montreal

The term became more common in English as Québécois largely replacing French Canadian as an expression of cultural and national identity among French Canadians living in Quebec during the Quiet Revolution of the 1960s. The predominant French Canadian nationalism and identity of previous generations was based on the protection of the French language, the Roman Catholic Church, and Church-run institutions across Canada and in parts of the United States. In contrast, the modern Québécois identity is secular and based on a social democratic ideal of an active Quebec government promoting the French language and French-speaking culture in the arts, education, and business within the Province of Quebec. Politically, this resulted in a push towards more autonomy for Quebec and an internal debate on Quebec independence and identity that continues to this day. The emphasis on the French language and Quebec autonomy means that French-speakers across Canada now self-identify more specifically with provincial or regional identity-tags, such as acadienne, or franco-canadienne, franco-manitobaine, franco-ontarienne or fransaskoise. Terms such as Franco-Ontarian and Franco-Manitoban are still predominant. Francophones and anglophones use many terms when discussing issues of francophone linguistic and cultural identity in English.

== Québécois nation ==
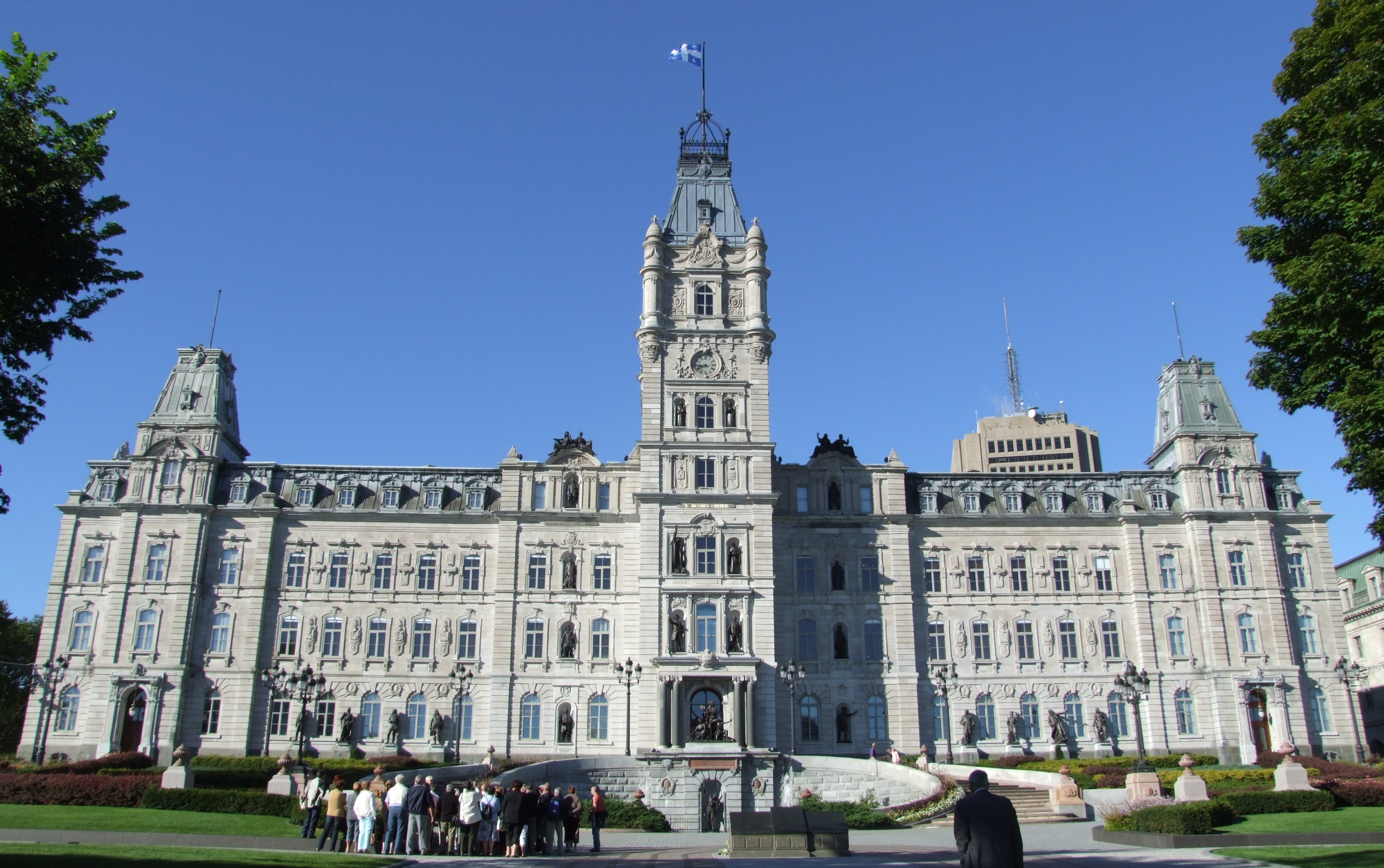
Parliament Building in Quebec City

The political shift towards a new Quebec nationalism in the 1960s led to Québécois increasingly referring to provincial institutions as being national. This was reflected in the change of the provincial Legislative Assembly to National Assembly in 1968. Nationalism reached an apex in the 1970s and 1990s, with contentious constitutional debates resulting in close to half of all of French-speaking Québécois seeking recognition of nation status through tight referendums on Quebec sovereignty in 1980 and 1995. Having lost both referendums, the sovereigntist Parti Québécois government renewed the push for recognition as a nation through symbolic motions that gained the support of all parties in the National Assembly. Bloc Québécois leader Gilles Duceppe scheduled a motion in the House of Commons for November 23, 2006, that would have recognized "Quebecers as a nation". Conservative Prime Minister Stephen Harper tabled the Québécois nation motion the day before the Bloc Québécois resolution came to a vote. The English version changed the word Quebecer to Québécois and added "within a united Canada" at the end of the Bloc motion.

The "Québécois nation" was recognized by the House of Commons of Canada on November 27, 2006. The Prime Minister specified that the motion used the "cultural" and "sociological" as opposed to the "legal" sense of the word "nation". According to Harper, the motion was of a symbolic political nature, representing no constitutional change, no recognition of Quebec sovereignty, and no legal change in its political relations within the federation. The Prime Minister has further elaborated, stating that the motion's definition of Québécois relies on personal decisions to self-identify as Québécois, and therefore is a personal choice.

== Québécois in census and ethnographic studies ==
The Québécois self-identify as an ethnic group in both the English and French versions of the Canadian census and in demographic studies of ethnicity in Canada.

In the 2016 census, 74,575 chose Québécois as one of multiple responses with 119,985 choosing it as a single response (194,555 as a combined response).

In the 2001 Census of Canada, 98,670 Canadians, or just over 1% of the population of Quebec, identified "Québécois" as their ethnicity, ranking "Québécois" as the 37th most common response. These results were based on a question on residents in each household in Canada: "To which ethnic or cultural group(s) did this person's ancestors belong?", along with a list of sample choices ("Québécois" did not appear among the various sample choices). The ethnicity "Canadien" or Canadian, did appear as an example on the questionnaire, and was selected by 4.9 million people or 68.2% of the Quebec population.

In the more detailed Ethnic Diversity Survey, Québécois was the most common ethnic identity in Quebec, reported by 37% of Quebec's population aged 15 years and older, either as their only identity or alongside other identities. The survey, based on interviews, asked the following questions: "1) I would now like to ask you about your ethnic ancestry, heritage or background. What were the ethnic or cultural origins of your ancestors? 2) In addition to "Canadian", what were the other ethnic or cultural origins of your ancestors on first coming to North America?" This survey did not list possible choices of ancestry and permitted multiple answers. In census ethnic surveys, French-speaking Canadians identify their ethnicity most often as French, Canadien, Québécois, or French Canadian, with the latter three referred to by Jantzen (2005) as "French New World" ancestries because they originate in Canada. Jantzen (2005) distinguishes the English Canadian, meaning "someone whose family has been in Canada for multiple generations", and the French Canadien, used to refer to descendants of the original settlers of New France in the 17th and 18th centuries.

Those reporting "French New World" ancestries overwhelmingly had ancestors that went back at least 4 generations in Canada: specifically, 90% of Québécois traced their ancestry back this far. Fourth generation Canadiens and Québécois showed considerable attachment to their ethno-cultural group, with 70% and 61% respectively reporting a strong sense of belonging.

The generational profile and strength of identity of French New World ancestries contrast with those of British or Canadian ancestries, which represent the largest ethnic identities in Canada. Although deeply rooted Canadians express a deep attachment to their ethnic identity, most English-speaking Canadians of British ancestry generally cannot trace their ancestry as far back in Canada as French-speakers. As a result, their identification with their ethnicity is weaker tending to have a more broad based cultural identification: for example, only 50% of third generation "Canadians" strongly identify as such, bringing down the overall average. The survey report notes that 80% of Canadians whose families had been in Canada for three or more generations reported "Canadian and provincial or regional ethnic identities". These identities include "Québécois" (37% of Quebec population), "Acadian" (6% of Atlantic provinces) and "Newfoundlander" (38% of Newfoundland and Labrador).

== Special terms using 'Québécois' ==
French expressions employing "Québécois" often appear in both French and English.

- Parti Québécois: Provincial-level political party that supports Quebec independence from Canada
- Bloc Québécois: Federal-level political party that supports Quebec independence from Canada
- Québécois de souche ("old-stock Quebecker"): Quebecer who can trace their ancestry back to the regime of New France
- Québécois pure laine: "true blue" or "dyed-in-the-wool" Quebecker
- Québécois francophone: "francophone Quebecer"
- Québécois anglophone: "anglophone Quebecer"
- néo-Québécois ("new Quebecers"): immigrant Quebecers
- Le Québec aux Québécois ("Quebec for Québécois", or "Quebec for Quebecers"): slogan sometimes chanted at Quebec nationalist rallies or protests. This slogan can be controversial, as it might be interpreted both as a call for a Quebec controlled by Québécois pure laine, with possible xenophobic connotations, or as a call for a Quebec controlled by the inhabitants of the province of Quebec, and free from outside interference.

== See also ==
- Language demographics of Quebec
- Culture of Quebec
- Cuisine of Quebec
- Symbols of Quebec
- English-speaking Quebecers
- List of people from Quebec
- Quebecer (disambiguation)
- Quebec (disambiguation)
