= HMS Port Napier =

British World War II auxiliary minesweeper that caught fire and exploded

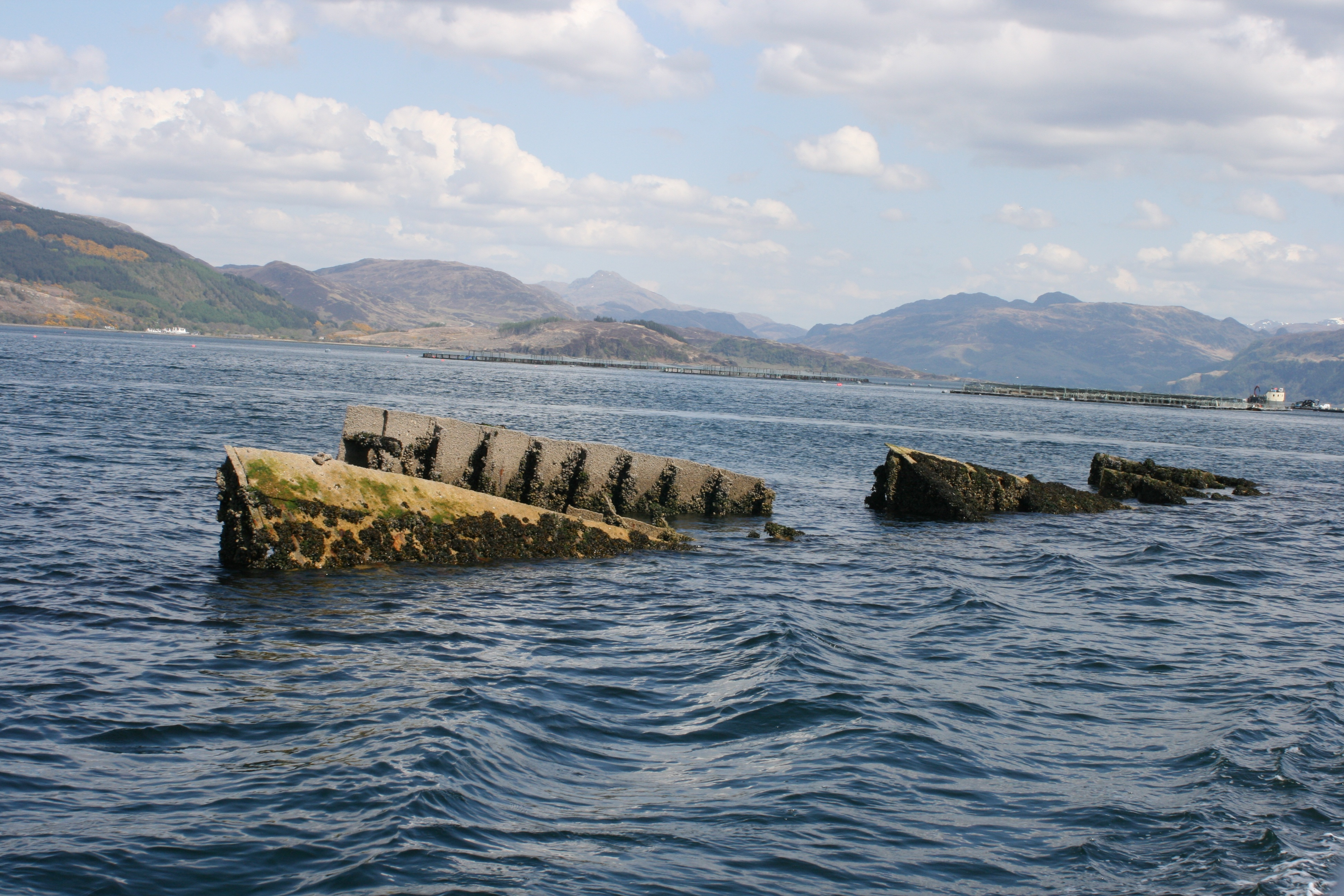
- Port Napier's wreck in Loch Alsh in 2010

History

United Kingdom
- Name: Port Napier
- Namesake: Napier Port
- Owner: Port Line
- Operator: Royal Navy
- Port of registry: London
- Builder: Swan, Hunter & Wigham Richardson, Wallsend
- Yard number: 1569
- Launched: 23 April 1940
- Completed: June 1940
- Commissioned: 12 June 1940
- Identification: UK official number 167578; call sign GLSK; pennant number M32
- Fate: Fire & explosion, November 1940

General characteristics
- Type: Auxiliary minelayer
- Tonnage: 9,847 GRT, 5,906 NRT
- Length: 503.3 ft (153.4 m)
- Beam: 68.2 ft (20.8 m)
- Depth: 29.8 ft (9.1 m)
- Installed power: 7,500 bhp
- Propulsion: 2 × screws; 2 × two-stroke diesel engines
- Speed: 16 knots (30 km/h)
- Sensors & processing systems: wireless direction finding; echo sounding device; gyrocompass
- Armament: 2 × 4-inch guns; 2 × 2-pounder guns; 4 × Oerlikon 20 mm cannons; 600 × mines
- Notes: sister ships: Port Jackson, Port Phillip, Port Victor

HMS Port Napier was a British motor ship that was designed and laid down as a civilian cargo ship but completed in 1940 as an auxiliary minelayer for the Royal Navy. An engine room fire caused an explosion that destroyed her in November 1940. Her remains in Loch Alsh in Scotland are now a recreational wreck diving site.

She was the third of four ships called Port Napier to be owned by Port Line. She was named after Napier Port on the North Island of New Zealand.

== Four sister ships ==
Between 1937 and 1942 Swan, Hunter & Wigham Richardson's Wallsend shipyard built four twin-screw motor ships for Port Line. The first was the refrigerated cargo ship Port Jackson, launched in November 1936 and completed in January 1937. Her sister ships Port Napier, Port Phillip and Port Victor were launched in 1940, 1941 and 1942 respectively. Their dimensions and appearance were similar to that of Port Jackson, but their engines were five-cylinder instead of four-cylinder.

Port Napier was built as yard number 1569. She was launched on 23 April 1940 and completed that June. Her registered length was 503.3 ft (153.4 m), her beam was 68.2 ft (20.8 m) and her depth was 29.8 ft (9.1 m). Her tonnages were 9,847 GRT and 5,906 NRT.

She had a pair of five-cylinder, single-acting, two-stroke diesel engines, built by William Doxford & Sons of Sunderland, which between them developed a total of 7,500 bhp and gave her a speed of 16 knots (30 km/h).

Port Line registered Port Napier at London. Her UK official number was 167578 and her wireless telegraph call sign was GLSK. But she never entered merchant service. The Admiralty requisitioned her, and had her completed as an auxiliary minelayer.

== Auxiliary minelayer ==
Port Napier's holds were adapted to carry 600 mines, and chutes were installed in her stern to lay them. A pair of narrow-gauge railways was laid inside the ship, one on each side, to carry each mines on a trolley from her holds to her stern chutes. She was armed with two QF 4-inch naval gun Mk Vs, two QF 2-pounder naval guns and four Oerlikon 20 mm cannons, and protected with 2-inch (51 mm) armour plate.

On 12 June 1940 the ship was commissioned as HMS Port Napier, with the pennant number M32. By mid-August she had joined the 1st Minelaying Squadron at Kyle of Lochalsh (Port ZA), along with four other auxiliary minesweepers, and an escort of Royal Navy destroyers.

On 17 August 1940 the Squadron including Port Napier left Kyle of Lochalsh on minelaying mission SN 12. They returned on 19 August. On 11 September 1940 the Squadron including Port Napier left Kyle of Lochalsh on minelaying mission SN 41. They returned on 12 September. It was claimed that Port Napier "had proved to be an excellent minelayer".

== Loss ==
In November 1940 the Squadron prepared at Kyle of Lochalsh for minelaying mission SN 11. Port Napier loaded 600 mines. Most of the mines had their detonator inserted, as it was easier to do this in port than at sea.

On the evening of 26 November a gale blew, causing Port Napier to drag her anchor. Her anchor chain fouled that of a collier, and the two ships drifted until they ran aground on the shore of the Isle of Skye. Neither ship was damaged.

On 27 November Port Napier was de-bunkered to lighten and re-float her. As de-bunkering was being completed, a fire was reported in her engine room. For safety, all ships, including the collier, left port, and local residents were evacuated. Most of Port Napier's crew abandoned ship, but her mining party remained and started removing detonators from her mines. After about 20 minutes her lower mine deck became too hot, so they abandoned ship.

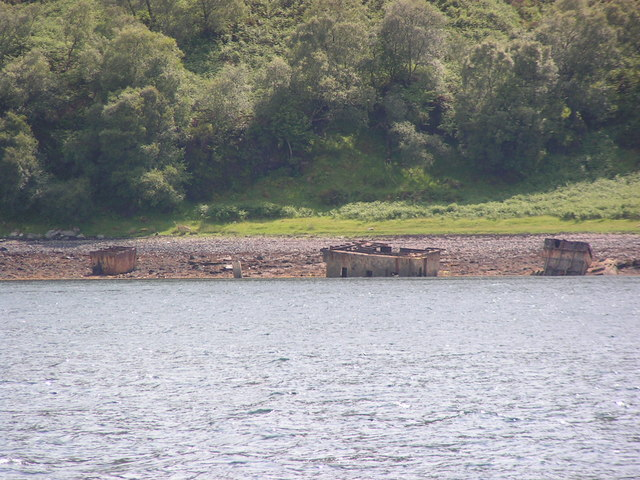
Parts of Port Napier's superstructure on a beach on the Isle of Skye

Port Napier did not explode, so the mining party returned. By now the heat was buckling the deck above her engine room, where the fire had started. They started jettisoning mines into the water via her stern chutes. The fire worsened, so the mining party abandoned ship a second time. Almost immediately after they had done so, there were two explosions. The first blew débris 200 feet (61 m) into the air. Large parts of her bridge superstructure landed on the shore of the Isle of Skye, 1/4 mile (400 m) away. The second created a tall column of smoke and flame. Port Napier rolled onto her starboard side, a total loss. There were no fatalities.

In 1944 some of her plates were salvaged for re-use. In 1950 the Royal Navy began to remove her mines and the 6,000 rounds of ammunition for her guns. The rest of the wreck remains, with her port side visible at low tide.

== The wreck today ==
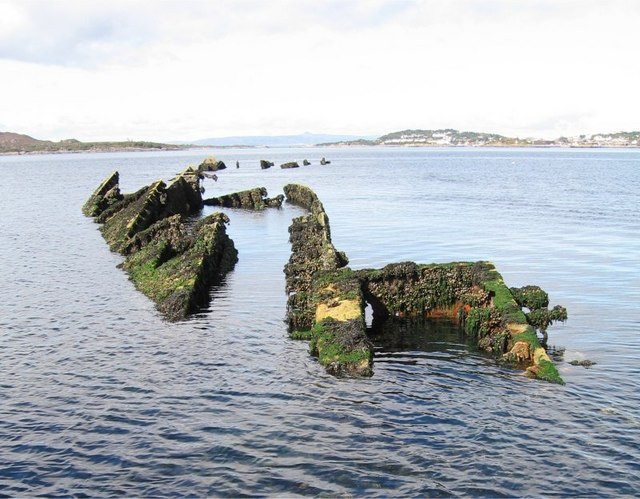
Port Napier's wreck in 2008

The remains of Port Napier's hull are on the south side of Loch Alsh at position 57°15′57.24″N 5°41′15.03″W. Parts of her superstructure are still on the beach nearby, but the main part of her wreck is in the water, where it attracts recreational divers. Penetration diving is facilitated by large parts of her port side being missing.

Her bow and the timber of her decking are fairly intact. Her four-inch guns were mounted aft of her forecastle, and at least one of them is still visible to divers. Trolleys for transporting the mines are scattered on the seabed. plumose anemones live on parts of the deck, including the timber decking and steel cables. Scallops also inhabit the wreck.

== Bibliography ==
- Haws, Duncan (1991). Port Line with Corry, Royden, Tyser and Milburn. Merchant Fleets. Vol. 21. Hereford: Travel Creatours Ltd Publications. ISBN 0-946378-18-5.
- Lloyd's Register of Shipping (PDF). Vol. I–Steamers and Motorships of 300 Tons, Trawlers, Tugs, Dredgers, etc. London: Lloyd's Register of Shipping. 1940 – via Southampton City Council.
