= Name of Quebec City =

Canadian municipal etymology

The official name of Quebec City (used by both the Government of Canada and Government of Quebec) is Québec, with an acute accent, in both official languages of Canada (Canadian English and Canadian French).

In English, the acute accent differentiates between the official name of the city named Québec, and the constitutional name of the province named Quebec, spelled without any diacritics. In French, they are both spelled Québec, with an acute accent.

== Distinction with the province ==
In unofficial English texts, the accent is often dropped and Québec is informally referred to as "Quebec City". In French, names of geographical regions such as provinces and countries are typically preceded by articles whereas city names are not (unless it is part of the name, such as "La Malbaie"). As a result, the province is called le Québec (thus "in Quebec" = au Québec, "from/of Quebec" = du Québec) while the city remains simply Québec ("in Québec City" = à Québec, "from/of Quebec City" = de Québec). Where context requires further differentiation, words such as "la ville de Québec" and "la province de Québec" can be used (taking care not to capitalize the word "ville").

== Other names ==
The name of the municipal corporate body instituted to govern Québec is Ville de Québec, in both English and French. This naming convention applies to all municipal corporations in the province (e.g. Ville de Montréal is the corporate body governing Montréal). Thus, where "Ville de ..." is capitalized, it means the corporate body and it is not part of the toponym (Montréal, Québec), but is the incorporated name of the city. In the English section of Ville de Québec's official website, the city is variously referred to as "Québec" and "Québec City" (with an accent) whereas the corporate body is referred to as "City of Québec".

Quebec City is sometimes referred to as "la capitale nationale" ("the national capital"). The government officially named it this way under the Union Nationale party, which governed during three periods between 1936 and 1970. The provincial administrative region where the city is situated bears the name Capitale-Nationale (capitalized). The word national is the adjective for the noun nation used in its normal basic sense and refers to Quebec as a nation within Canada, and has no indication of sovereignty.

== Demonyms ==
Residents of Québec are called, in French, Québécois (male) or Québécoise (female). To avoid confusion with Québécois/e meaning an inhabitant of the province, the term Québécois/e de Québec for residents of the city is sometimes used. In English, the terms Quebecer (or Quebecker) and Québécois/e are common.

== See also ==
- History of Quebec City
- HMCS Ville de Québec (FFH 332), the Royal Canadian Navy warship whose full name is a title, and is capitalized.
