= HMCS Ville de Québec =

Several Canadian naval units have been named HMCS Ville de Québec (meaning "Quebec City" in English).

- HMCS Ville de Québec (K242) (I) was a Flower-class corvette that served in the Royal Canadian Navy during the Second World War.
- HMCS Ville de Québec (FFH 332) (II) is a Halifax-class frigate serving the Canadian Forces from 1993 to present.

== Battle honours ==
- Atlantic, 1942–1944.
- Gulf of St. Lawrence, 1942.
- Mediterranean, 1943.
- English Channel, 1944–1945.

== See also ==
- HMCS Quebec
- HMS Quebec
- HMS Port Quebec
