= HMS Port Quebec =

Cargo ship that served as a minelayer and repair ship in WW2

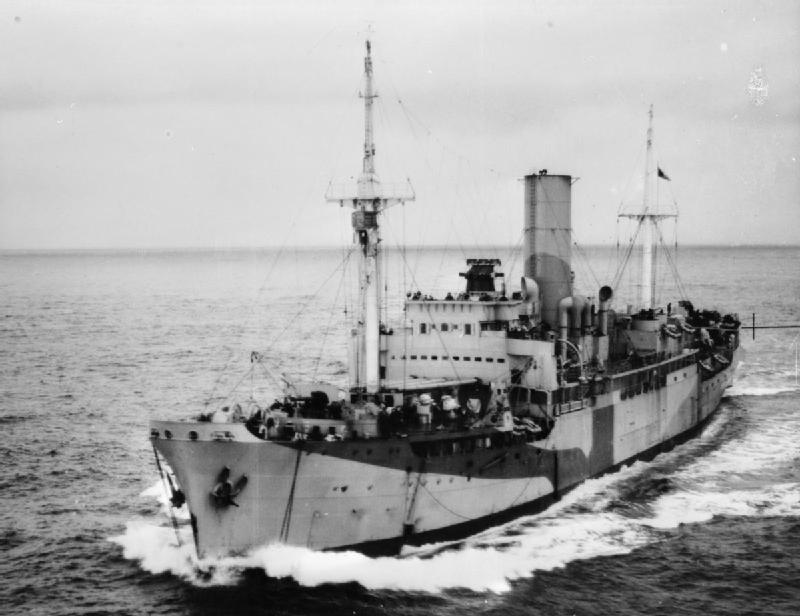
- HMS Port Quebec under way

History

United Kingdom
- Name: 1939: Port Quebec; 1944: Deer Sound; 1947: Port Quebec
- Namesake: 1940, 1947: Port of Quebec
- Owner: 1940: Port Line; 1945: Admiralty; 1947: Port Line
- Operator: 1940: (United Kingdom) Royal Navy; 1947: Port Line
- Port of registry: (United Kingdom) London
- Builder: JL Thompson & Sons, North Sands
- Cost: £207,783
- Yard number: 593
- Launched: 17 August 1939
- Completed: November 1939
- Commissioned: 1940
- Decommissioned: 1947
- Identification: UK official number 167532; call sign GWGQ; 1940: pennant number M59; 1944: pennant number F99
- Fate: Scrapped, December 1968

General characteristics
- Type: 1940: auxiliary minelayer; 1947: cargo ship
- Tonnage: 5,936 GRT, 3,452 NRT
- Length: 468.0 ft (142.6 m) overall; 451.0 ft (137.5 m) registered
- Beam: 59.7 ft (18.2 m)
- Depth: 25.2 ft (7.7 m)
- Decks: 2
- Installed power: 1,076 NHP
- Propulsion: 1 × screw; 1 × two-stroke diesel engine
- Speed: 14.5 knots (27 km/h)
- Capacity: 1948: 19,084 cubic feet (540 m^{3}) refrigerated; 1949: 37,102 cubic feet (1,051 m^{3}) refrigerated
- Sensors & processing systems: by 1947: wireless direction finding, echo sounding device, gyrocompass.; by 1951: radar; by 1959: position fixing device, radiotelephone
- Armament: 2 × 4-inch guns; 2 × 2-pounder guns; 13 × Oerlikon 20 mm cannon; 550 × mines

HMS Port Quebec was a British motor ship that was designed and launched in 1939 to be the refrigerated cargo ship Port Quebec, but completed in 1940 as an auxuiliary minelayer. In 1944 she was converted into an aircraft component repair ship and renamed HMS Deer Sound. In 1947 she was returned to her owner, Port Line, and completed as a cargo ship. She was scrapped in Taiwan in 1968.

== Building and identification ==
J.L. Thompson and Sons built the ship as yard number 593 at their North Sands shipyard in Sunderland on the River Wear. She was launched on 17 August 1939 and completed that November at a cost of £207,783. She was named Port Quebec because Port Line planned to use her on its Montreal, Australia and New Zealand (MANZ) service, which was a joint operation with Ellerman & Bucknall and the New Zealand Shipping Company.

Port Quebec's length overall was 468.0 ft (142.6 m) and her registered length was 451.0 ft (137.5 m). Her beam was 59.7 ft (18.2 m) and her depth was 25.2 ft (7.7 m). Her tonnages were 5,936 GRT and 3,452 NRT.

She had a single screw, driven by a five-cylinder, single-acting two-stroke diesel engine built by William Doxford & Sons of Sunderland. It was rated at 1,076 NHP and gave her a speed of 14.5 knots (27 km/h).

In 1940 Port Line registered Port Quebec in London. Her UK official number was 167532 and her wireless telegraph call sign was GWGQ.

== Naval service ==
In November 1939 the Admiralty requisitioned Port Quebec and had her completed as an auxiliary minelayer. She was armed with two QF 4-inch naval gun Mk V, two QF 2-pounder naval guns, 13 Oerlikon 20 mm cannons, and minelaying equipment. She had capacity for 550 mines.

In 1940 she was commissioned as HMS Port Quebec, with the pennant number M59. By mid-August she had joined the 1st Minelaying Squadron at Kyle of Lochalsh (port ZA) along with four other auxiliary minesweepers, plus an escort of Royal Navy destroyers. Port Quebec and other members of the 1st Minelaying Squadron laid mines in the Northern Barrage. The barrage was completed in September 1943.

In 1944 Port Quebec was converted into an aircraft component repair ship. She was renamed HMS Deer Sound, and her pennant number was changed to F99. On 1 January 1945 the Admiralty bought the ship from her owners.

== Merchant service ==
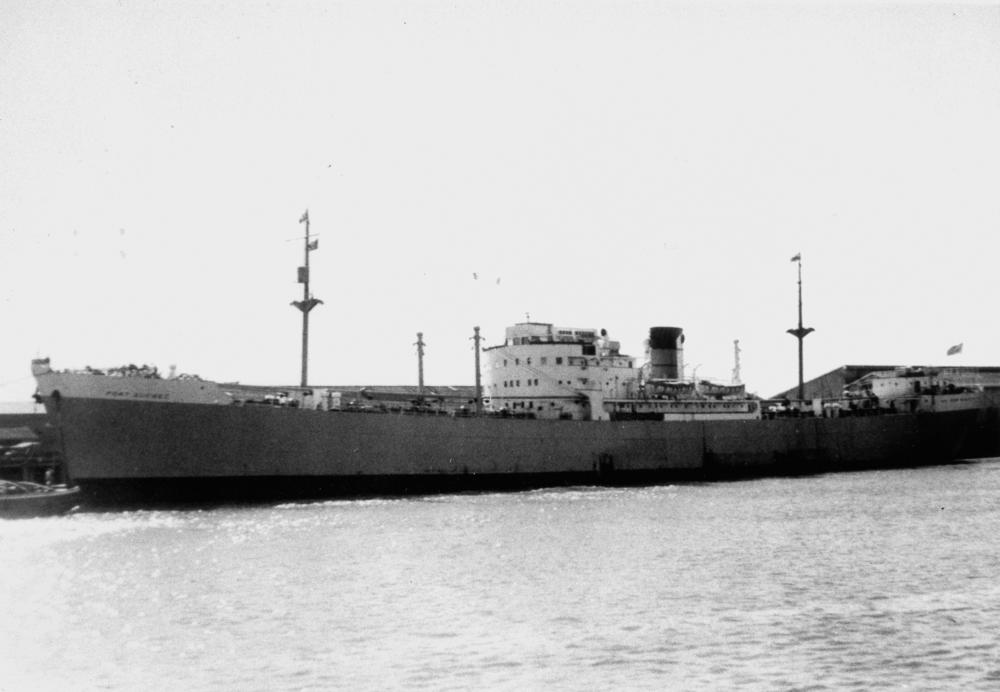
Port Quebec in Port Line service

On 24 October 1947 the Admiralty sold the ship back to Port Line, who restored her original name Port Quebec. She was completed as a cargo ship, with only part of her hold space refrigerated. In 1948 her refrigerated capacity was recorded as only 19,084 cubic feet (540 m^{3}). By 1950 this had been doubled to 37,102 cubic feet (1,051 m^{3}), but it was still only a small part of her total hold space.

By 1947 Port Quebec's navigation equipment included wireless direction finding, an echo sounding device and a gyrocompass. radar had been added by 1951, and a position fixing device and radiotelephone by 1959.

In December 1968 Port Quebec arrived in Kaohsiung in Taiwan to be scrapped.

== Bibliography ==
- Haws, Duncan (1991). Port Line with Corry, Royden, Tyser and Milburn. Merchant Fleets. Vol. 21. Hereford: Travel Creatours Ltd Publications. ISBN 0-946378-18-5.
- Lenton, HT; Colledge, JJ (1968). British and Dominion Warships of World War II. Garden City, NY: Doubleday & Co.
- Lloyd's Register of Shipping (PDF). Vol. II.–Steamers and Motorships of 300 Tons, Trawlers, Tugs, Dredgers, Etc. London: Lloyd's Register of Shipping. 1940 – via Southampton City Council.
- Lloyd's Register of Shipping. Vol. Steamers and Motorships of 300 Tons Gross and Over. London: Lloyd's Register of Shipping. 1947 – via Internet Archive.
- Mercantile Navy List. London. 1947 – via Crew List Index Project.
- "List of ships fitted with refrigerating appliances". Lloyd's Register of Shipping. Vol. II. M–Z. London: Lloyd's Register of Shipping. 1948 – via Internet Archive.
- "List of ships fitted with refrigerating appliances". Lloyd's Register of Shipping. Vol. II. M–Z. London: Lloyd's Register of Shipping. 1949 – via Internet Archive.
- Register Book. Vol. II M–Z. London: Lloyd's Register of Shipping. 1951 – via Internet Archive.
- Register Book. Vol. I Register of Ships. London: Lloyd's Register of Shipping. 1959 – via Internet Archive.
- Rohwer, Jürgen (2005). Chronology of the War at Sea 1939–1945: The Naval History of World War Two (Third Revised ed.). Annapolis, MD: Naval Institute Press. ISBN 1-59114-119-2.
