= List of gay, lesbian or bisexual people: C =

This is a partial list of notable people who were or are gay men, lesbian or bisexual.

The historical concept, definition and terminology of sexual orientation varies and has changed greatly over time; for example the general term "gay" wasn't used to describe sexual orientation until the mid 20th century. A number of different classification schemes have been used to describe sexual orientation since the mid-19th century, and scholars have often defined the term "sexual orientation" in divergent ways. Indeed, several studies have found that much of the research about sexual orientation has failed to define the term at all, making it difficult to reconcile the results of different studies. However, most definitions include a psychological component (such as the direction of an individual's erotic desire) and/or a behavioural component (which focuses on the sex of the individual's sexual partner/s). Some prefer to simply follow an individual's self-definition or identity.

The high prevalence of people from the West on this list may be due to societal attitudes towards homosexuality. The Pew Research Center's 2013 Global Attitudes Survey found that there is "greater acceptance in more secular and affluent countries," with "publics in 39 countries [having] broad acceptance of homosexuality in North America, the European Union, and much of Latin America, but equally widespread rejection in predominantly Muslim nations and in Africa, as well as in parts of Asia and in Russia. Opinion about the acceptability of homosexuality is divided in Israel, Poland and Bolivia." As of 2013, Americans are divided – a majority (60 percent) believes homosexuality should be accepted, while 33 percent disagree.

== C ==
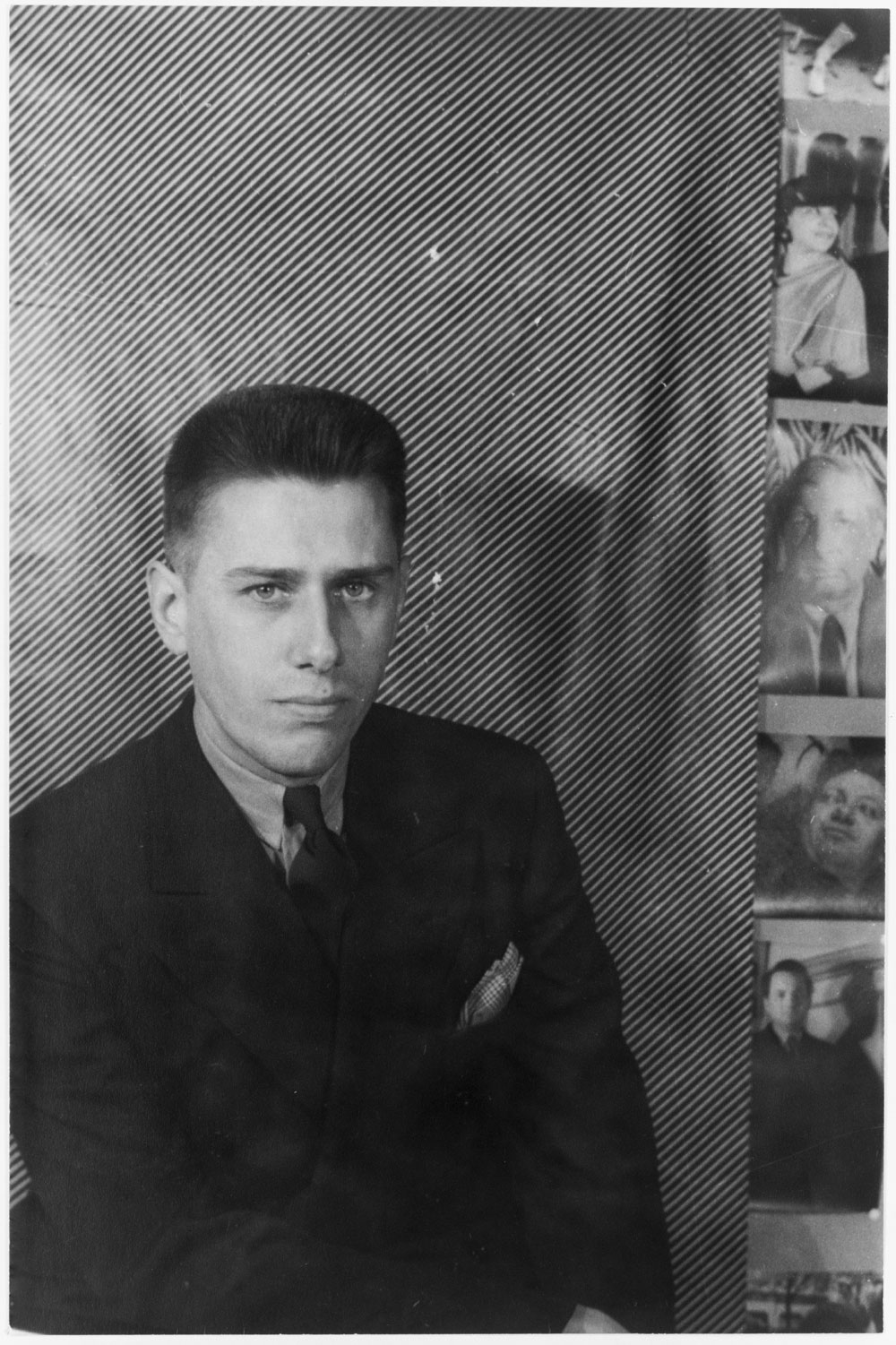
Artist Paul Cadmus

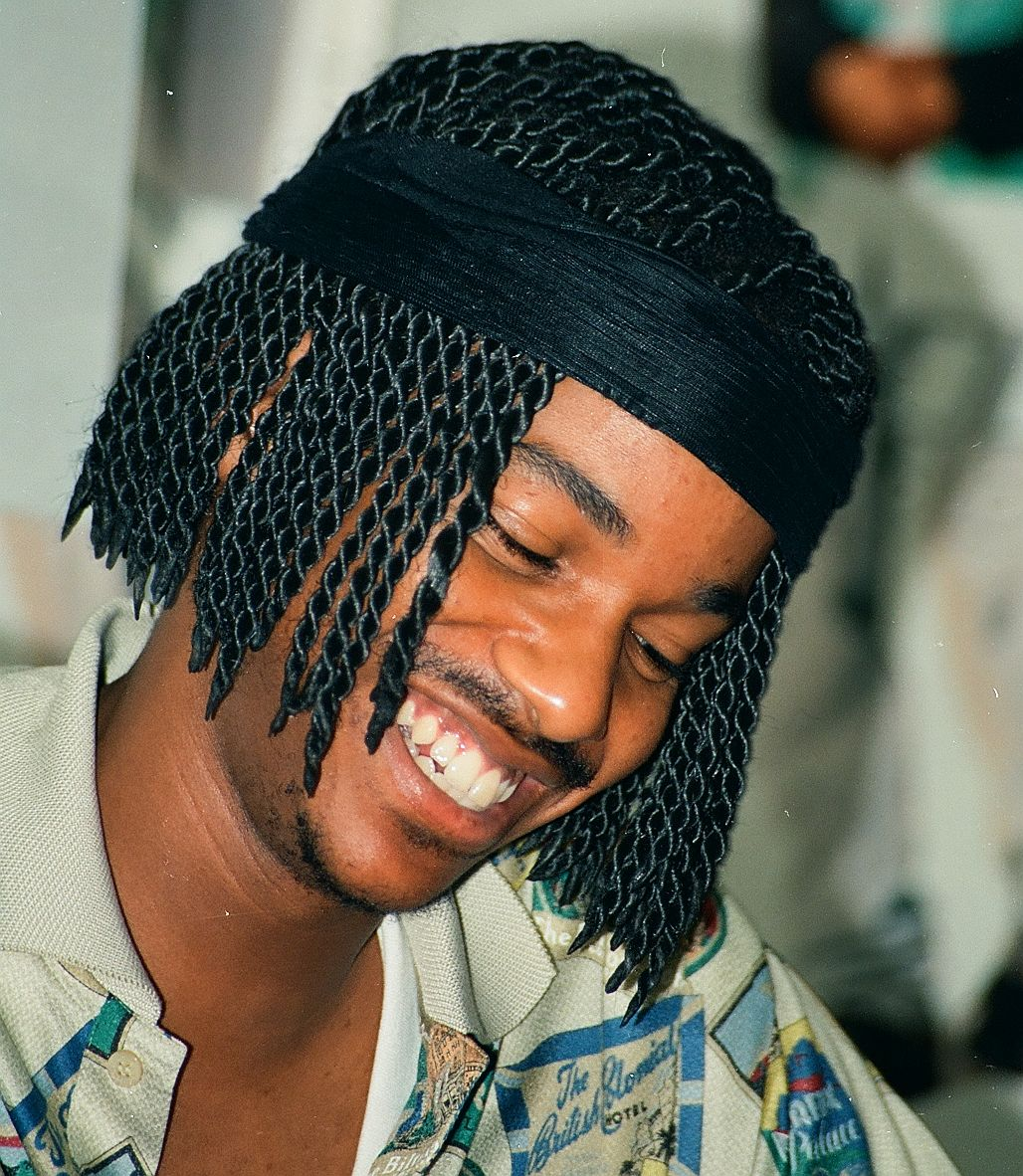
Singer Tevin Campbell

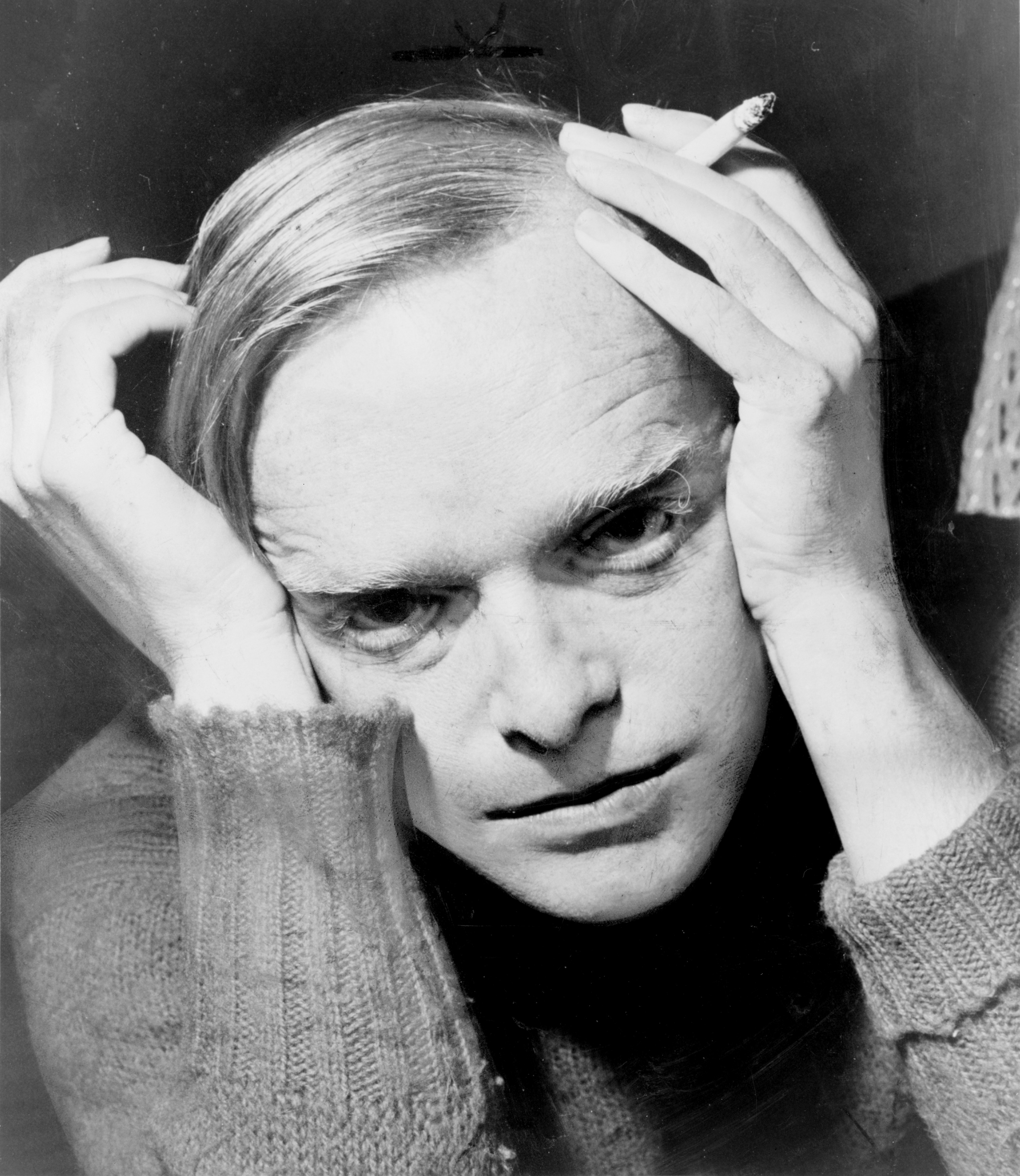
Writer Truman Capote

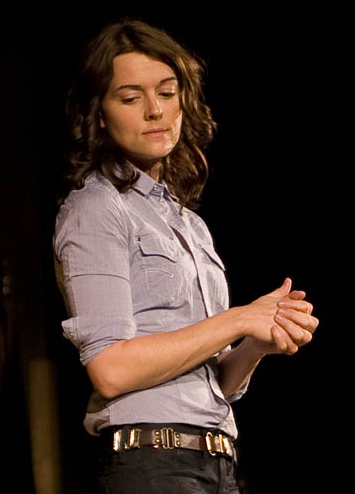
Musician Brandi Carlile

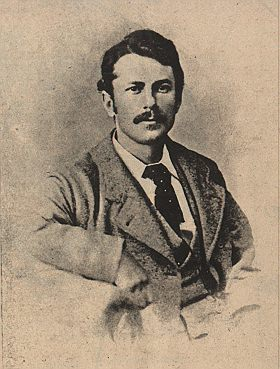
Social reformer Edward Carpenter

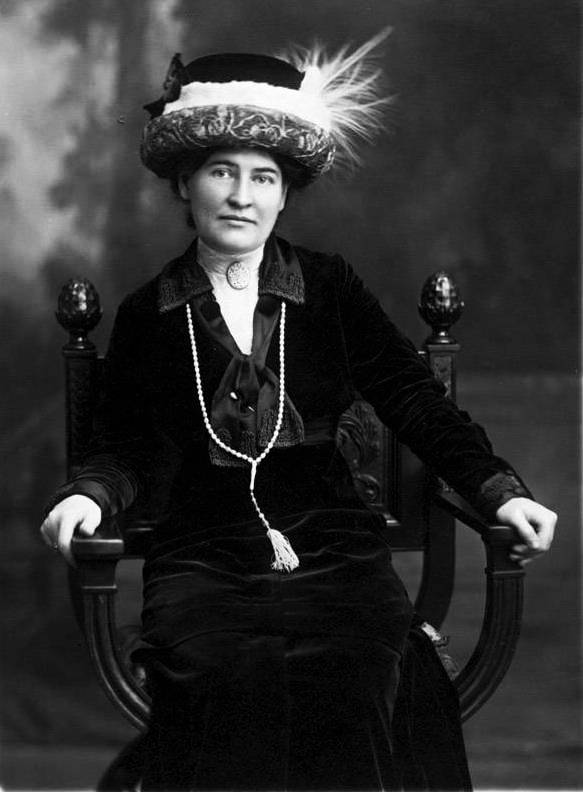
Author and poet Willa Cather

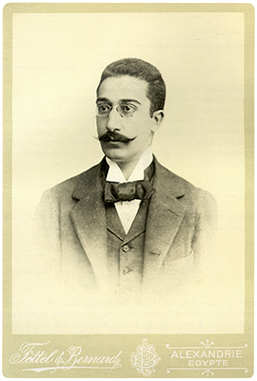
Poet, journalist and civil servant Constantine P. Cavafy

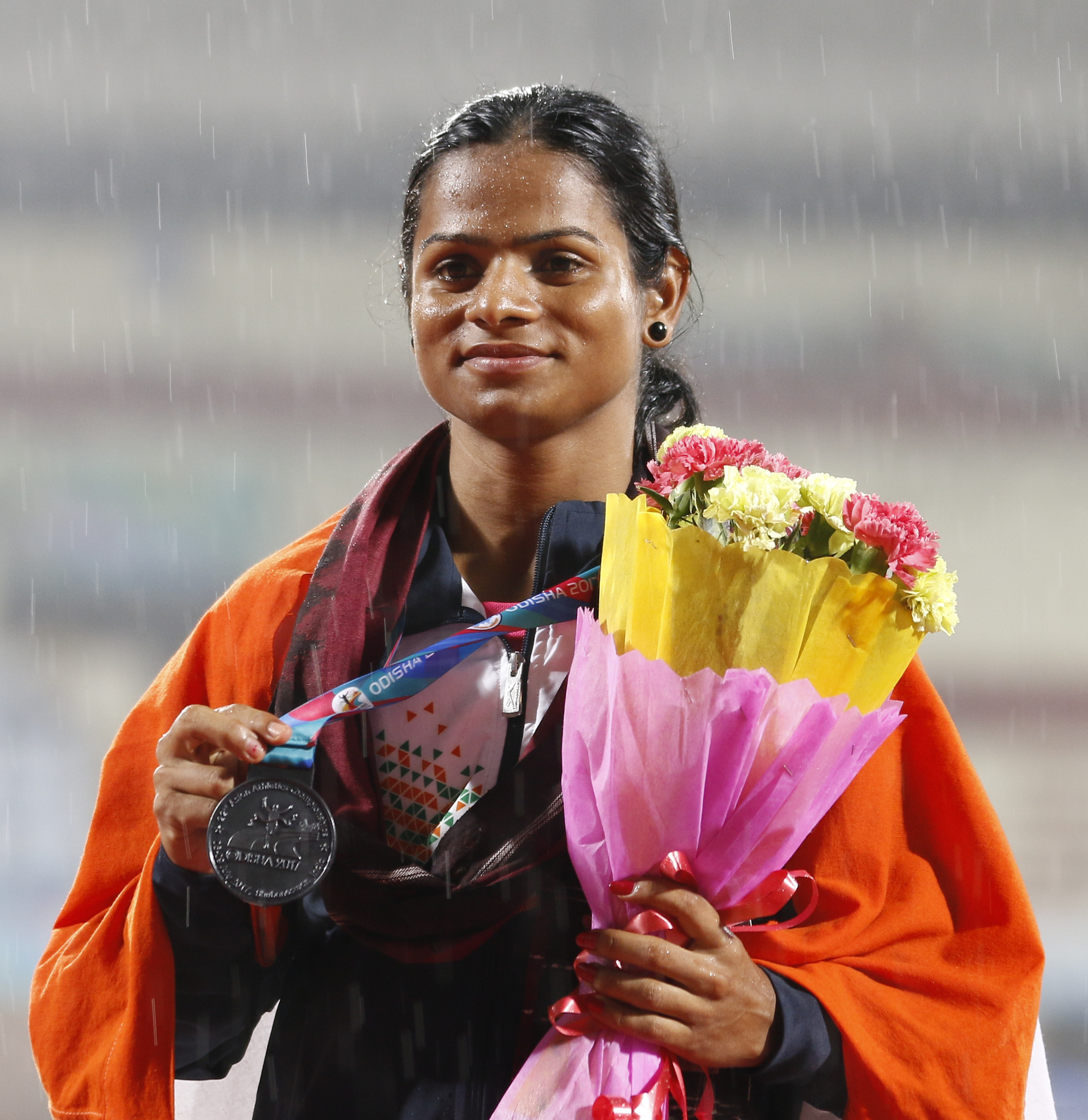
Sprinter Dutee Chand

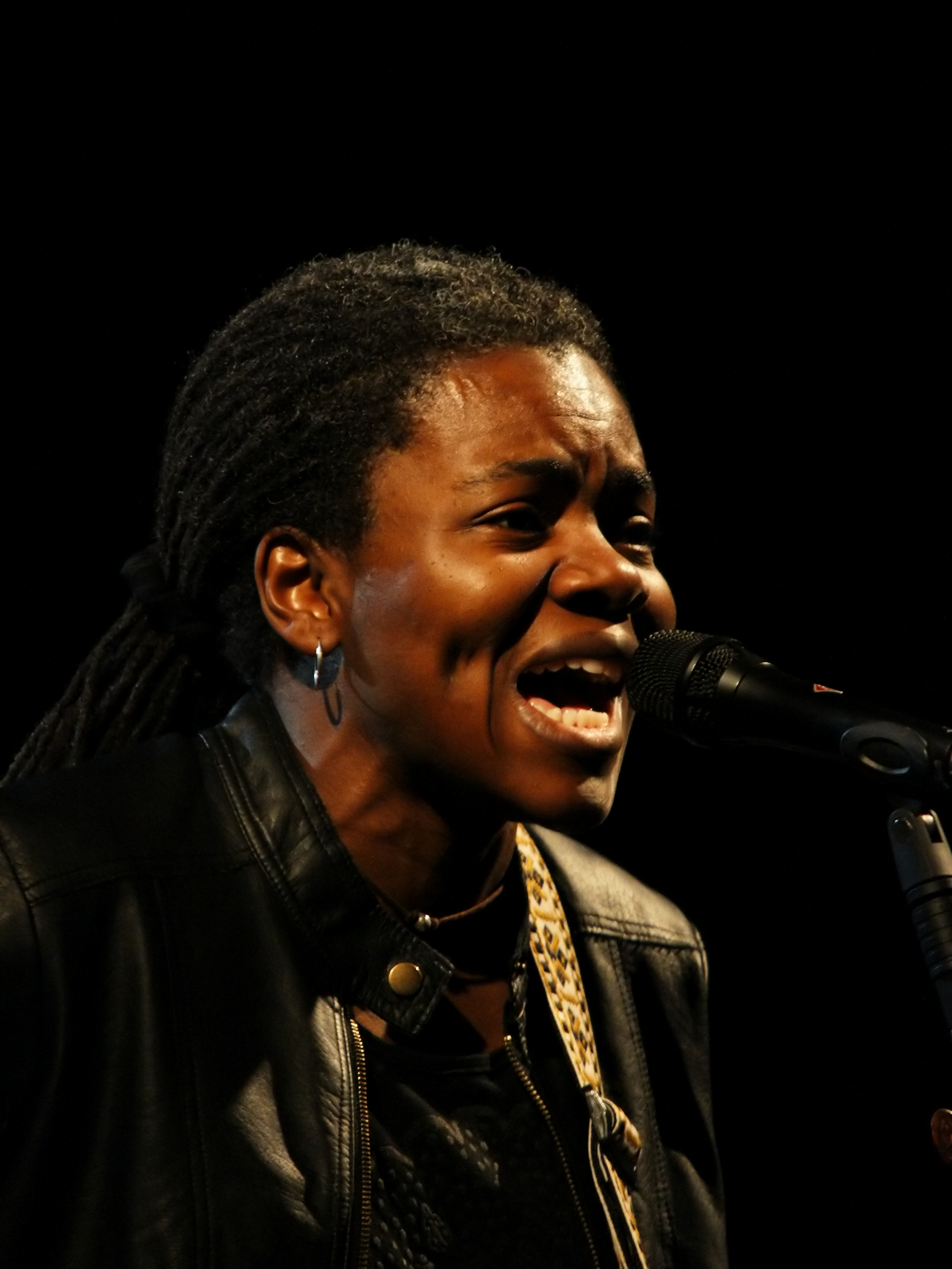
Singer-songwriter Tracy Chapman

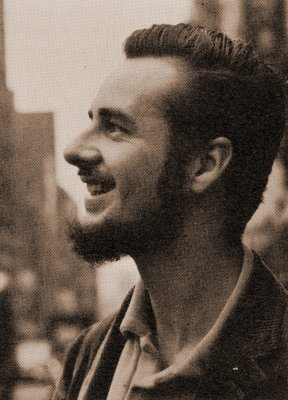
Folk singer Paul Clayton

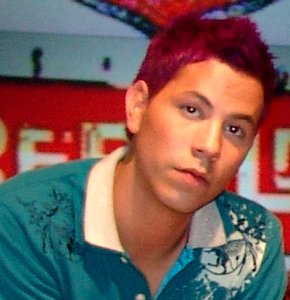
Actor Christian Chávez

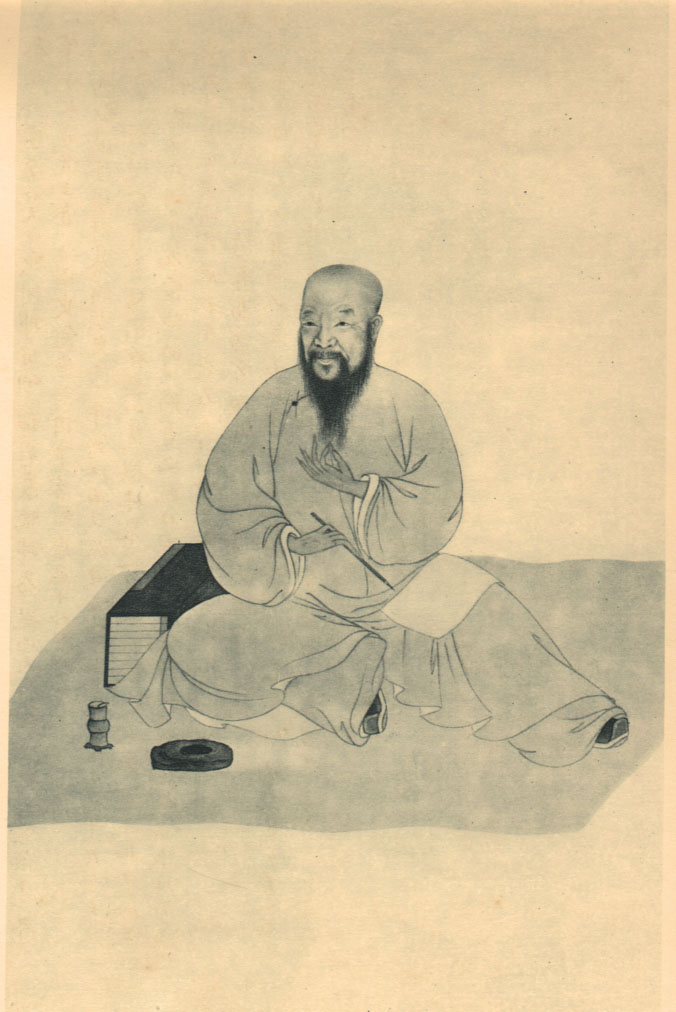
Poet Chen Weisong

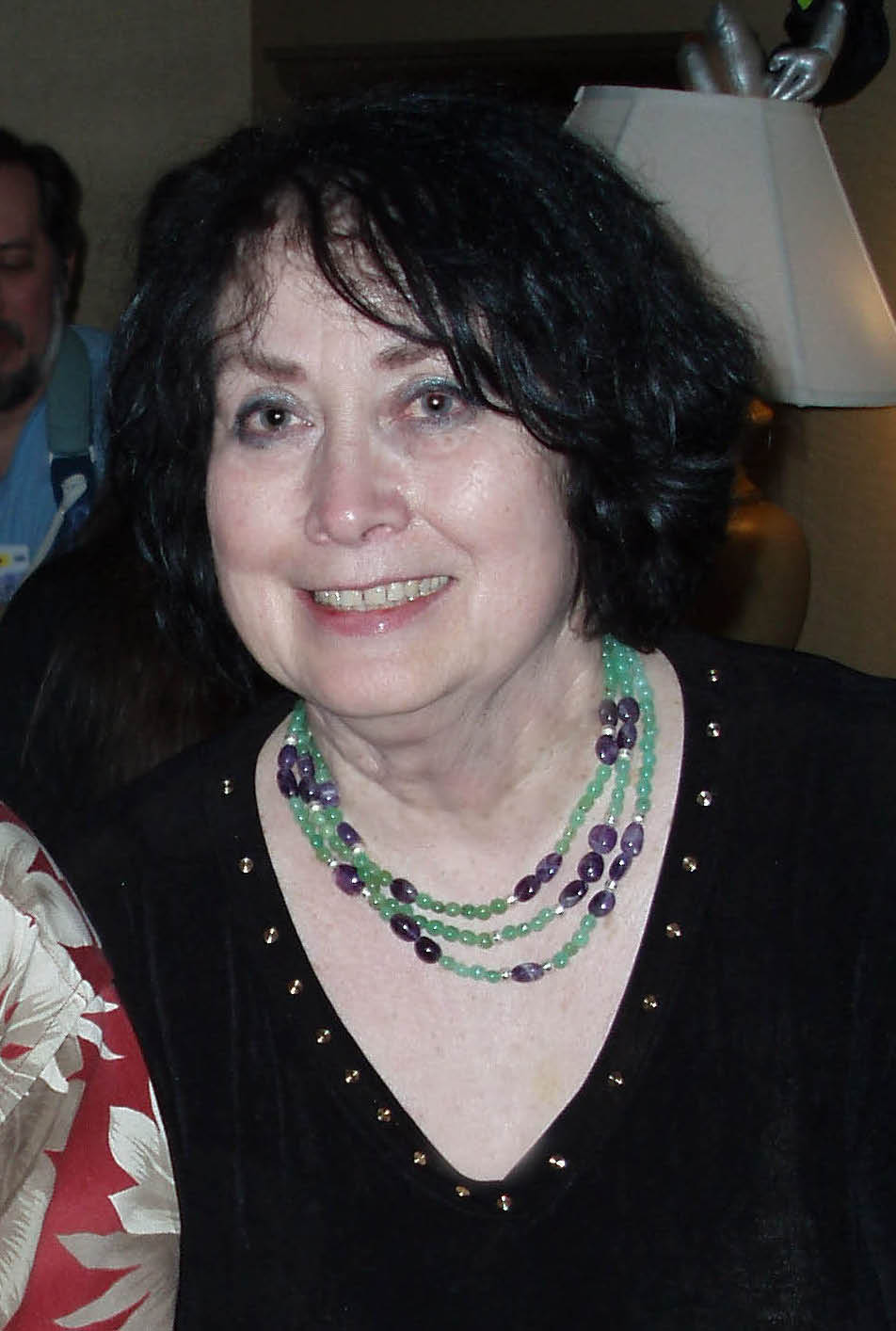
Writer C. J. Cherryh

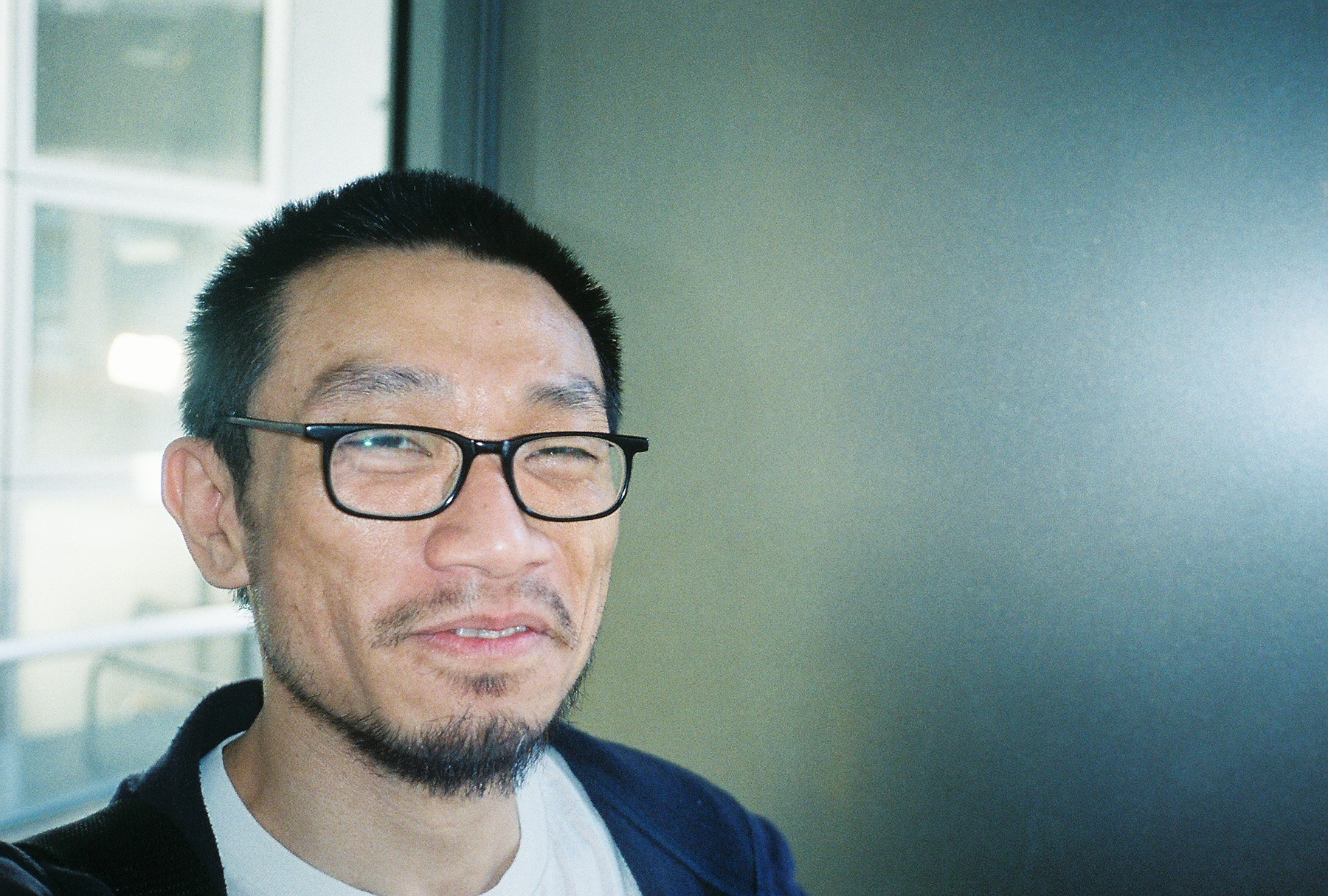
Poet and essayist Justin Chin

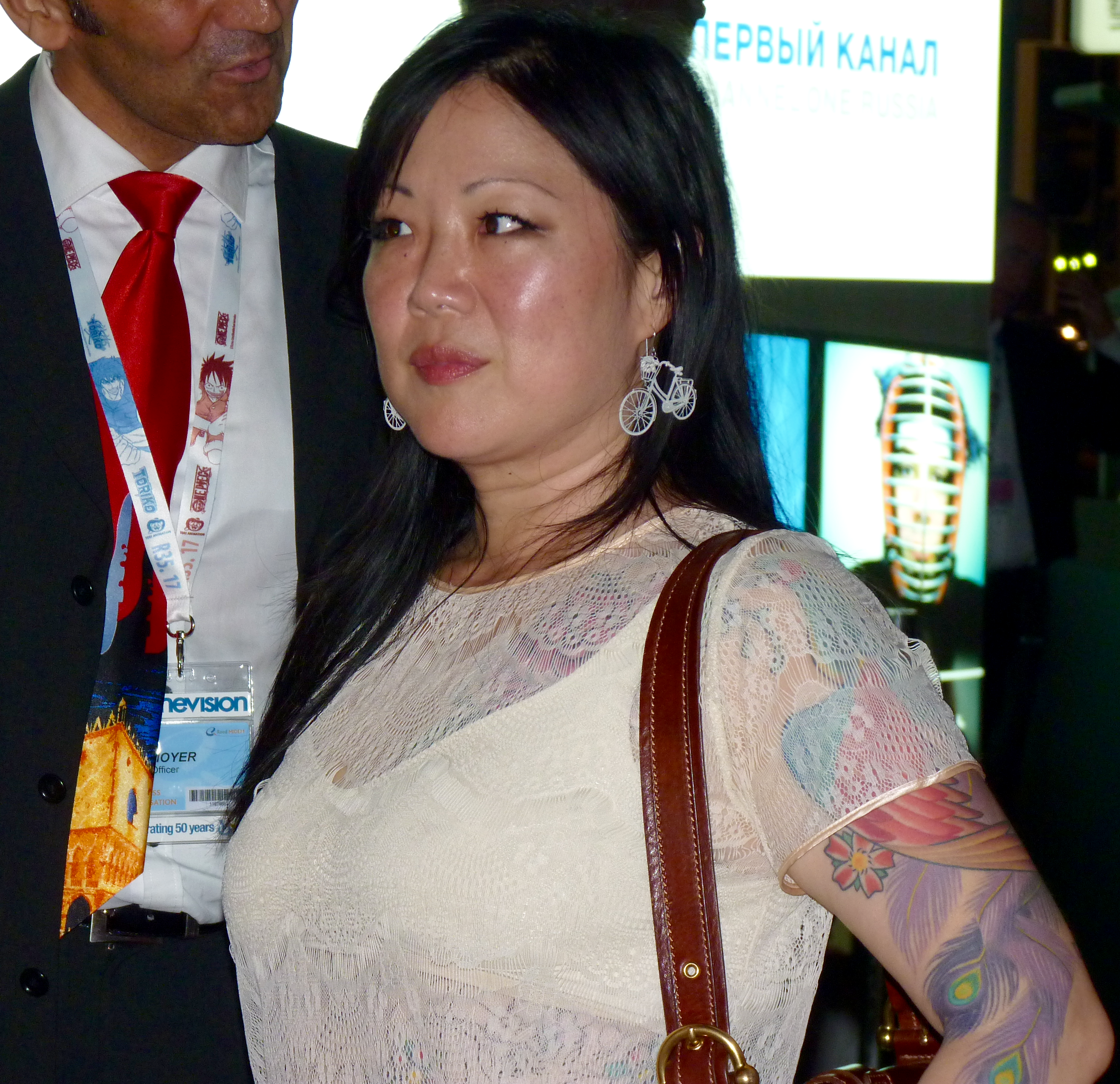
Comedian Margaret Cho

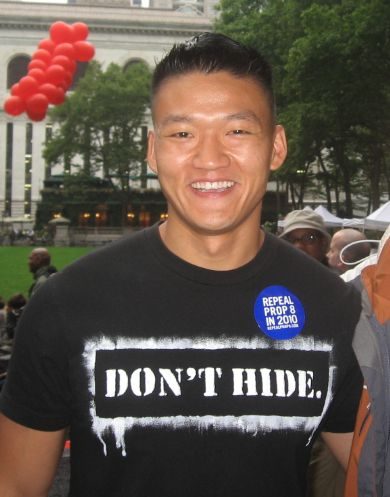
LGBT rights activist and former military officer Dan Choi

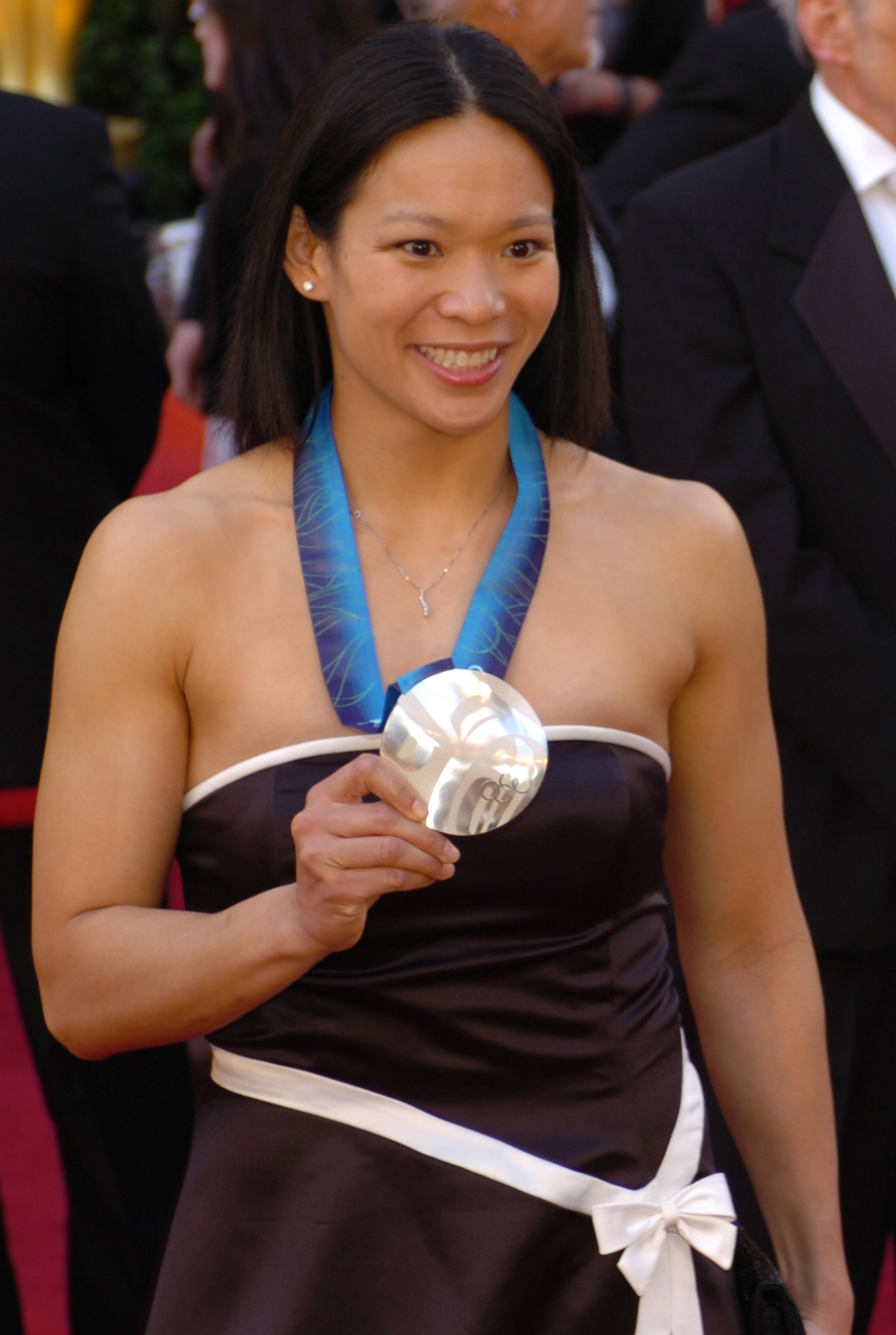
Ice hockey player Julie Chu

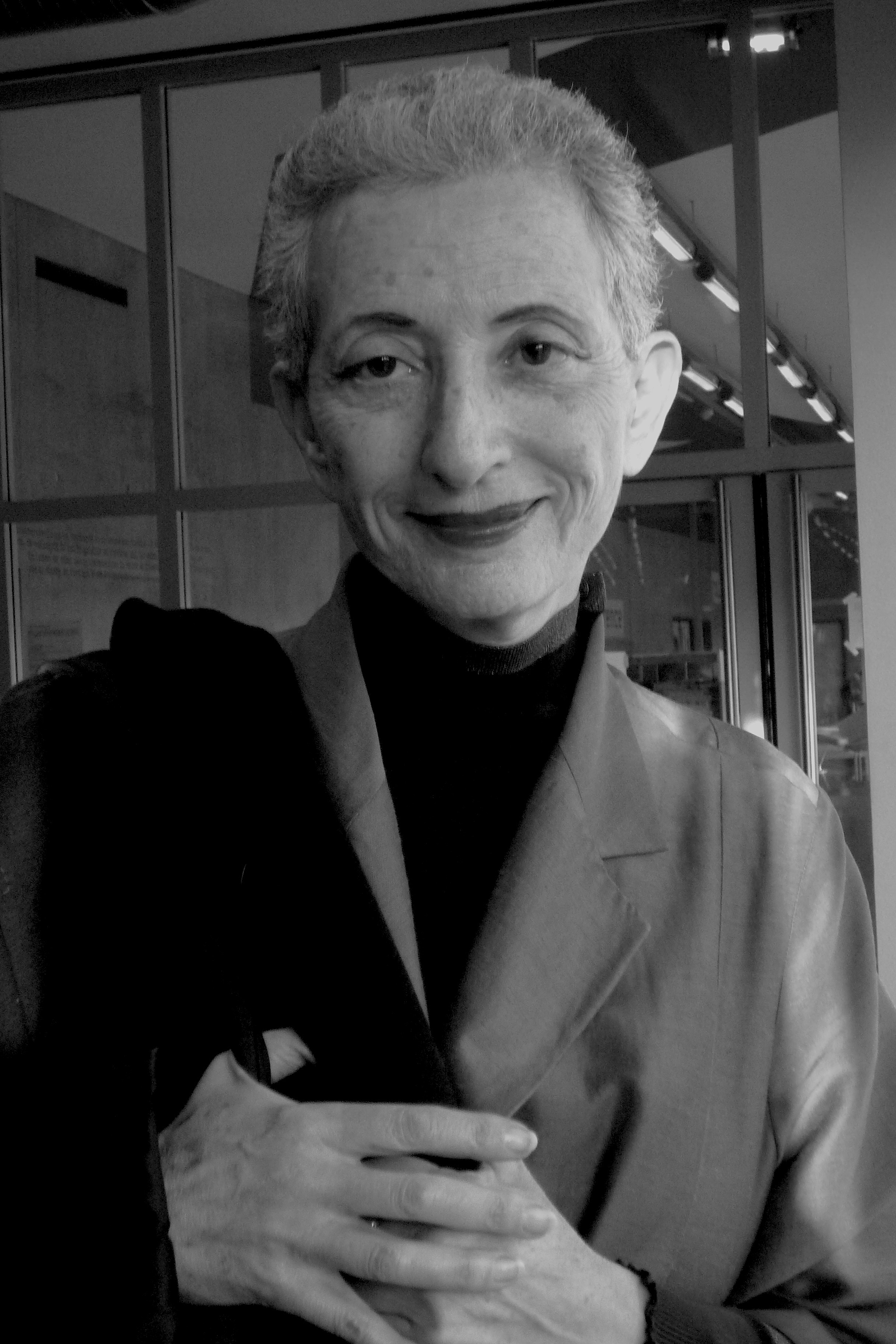
Professor, writer, poet, playwright, philosopher, literary critic and rhetorician Hélène Cixous

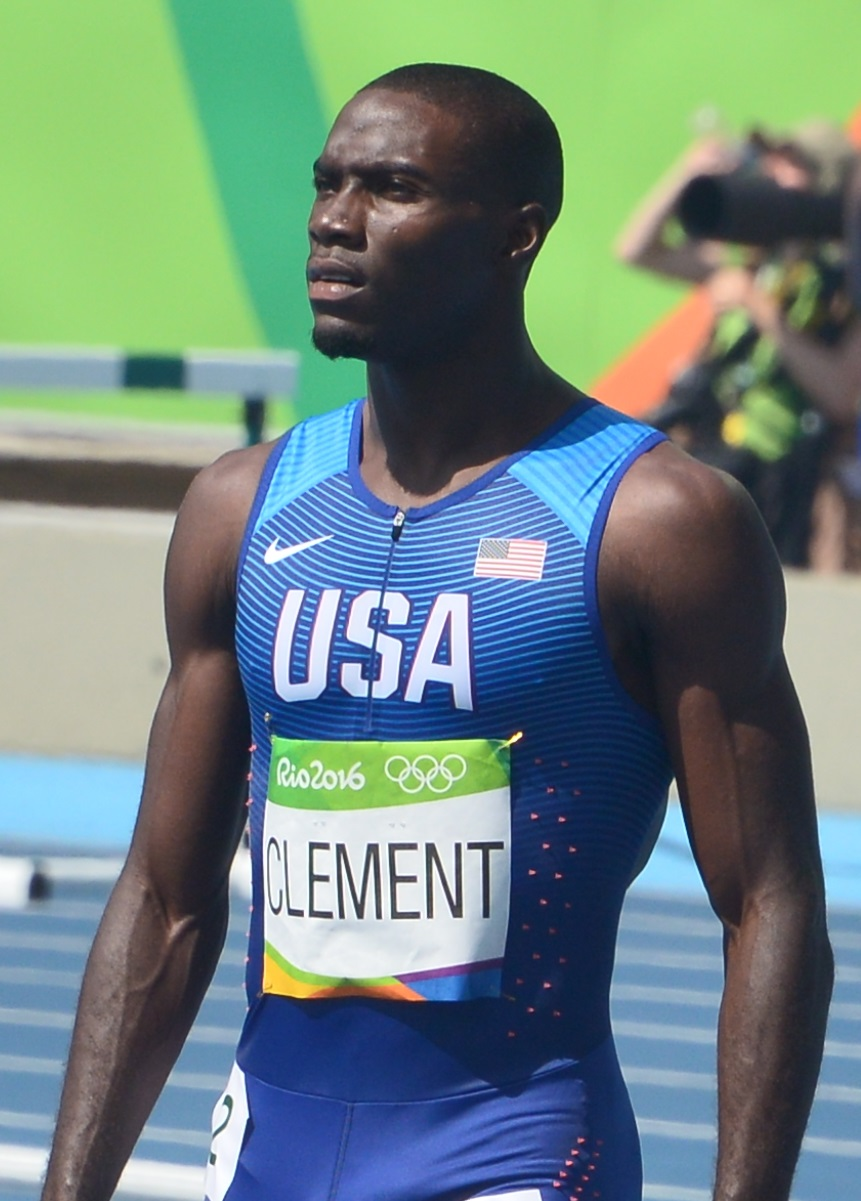
Track and field athlete Kerron Clement

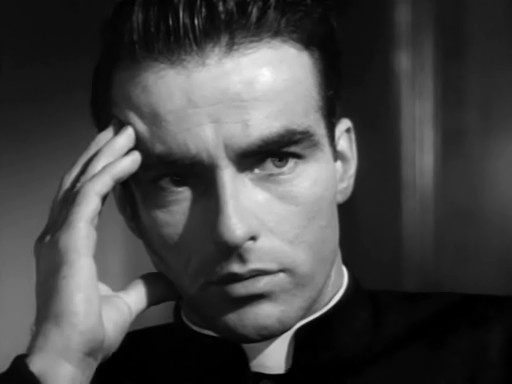
Actor Montgomery Clift

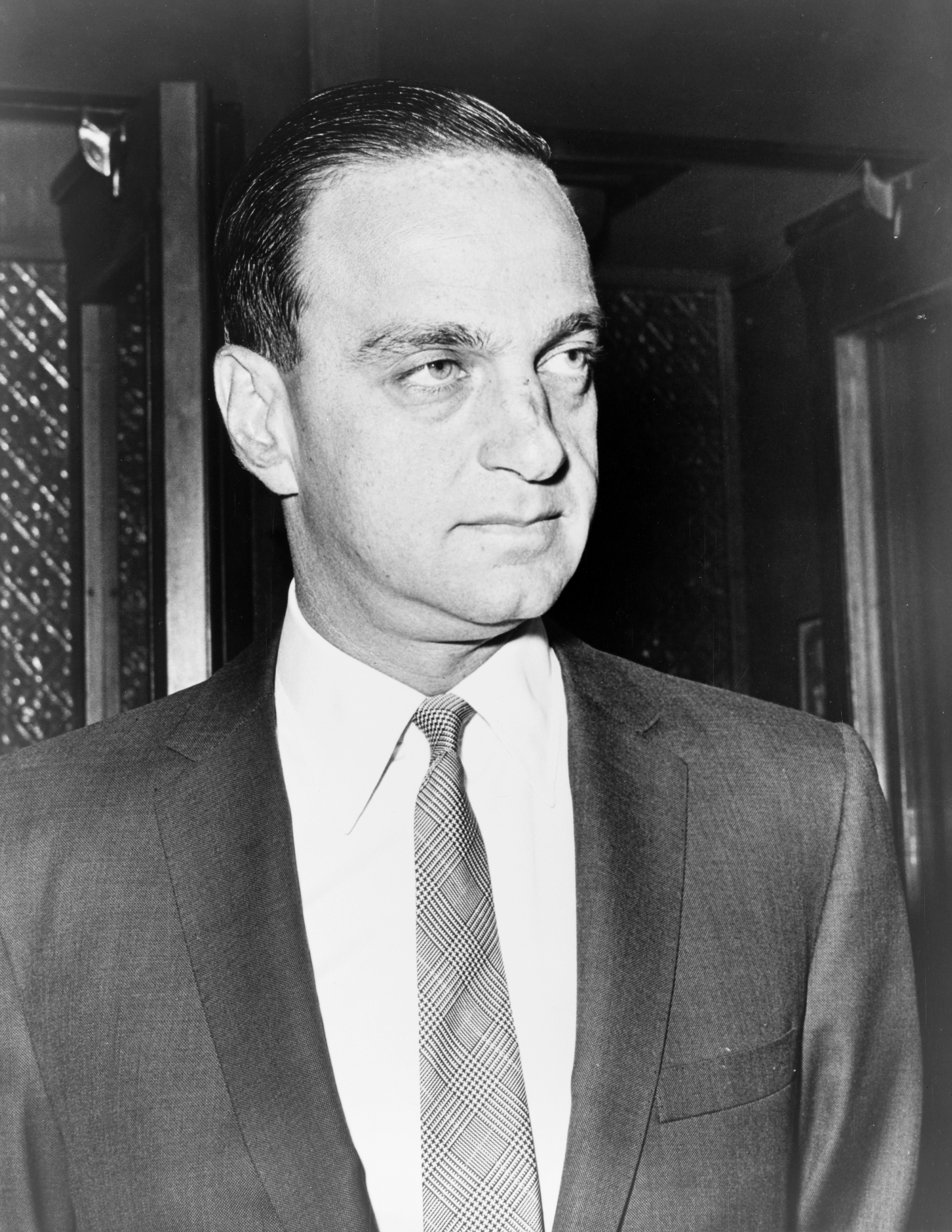
Attorney Roy Cohn

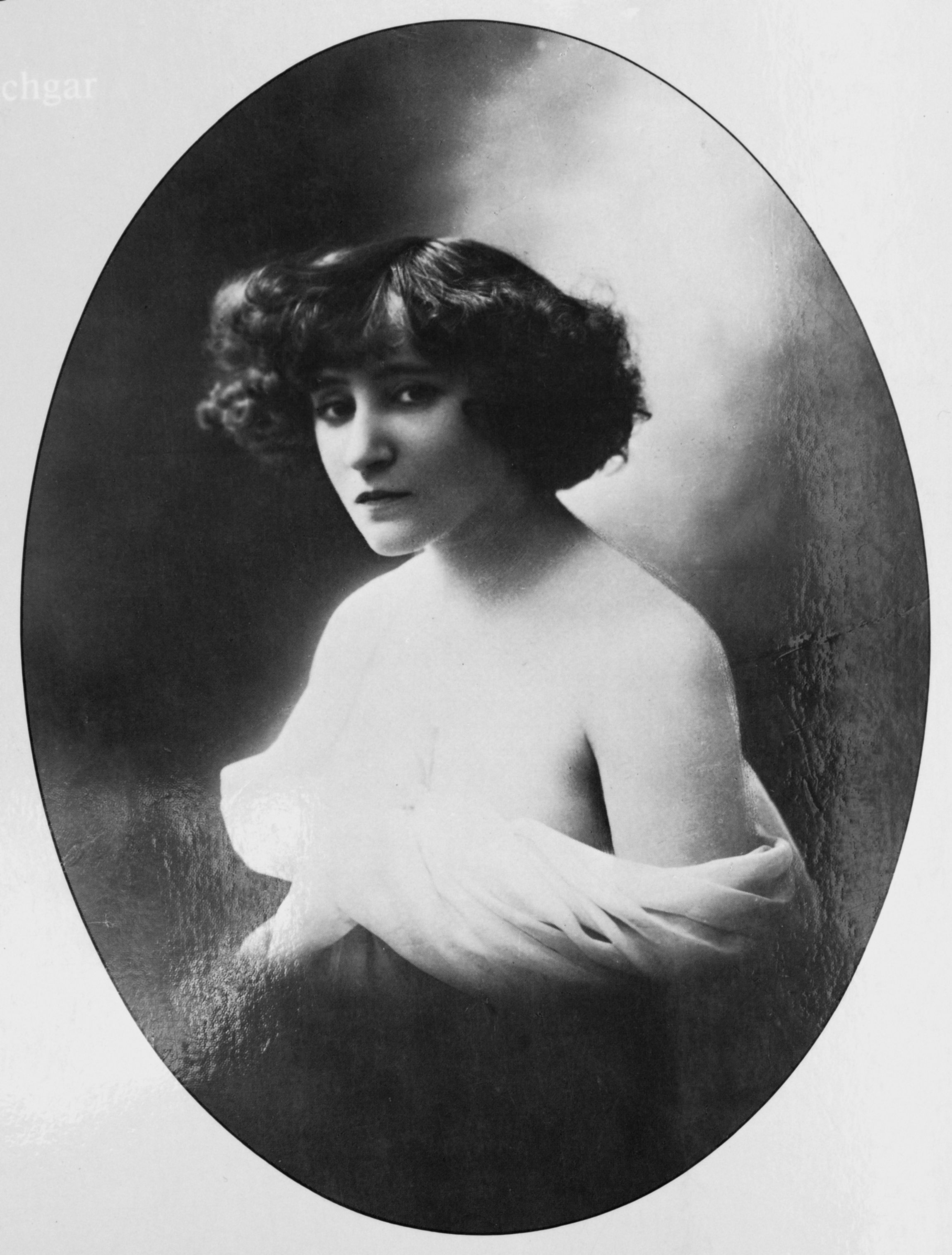
Writer Colette

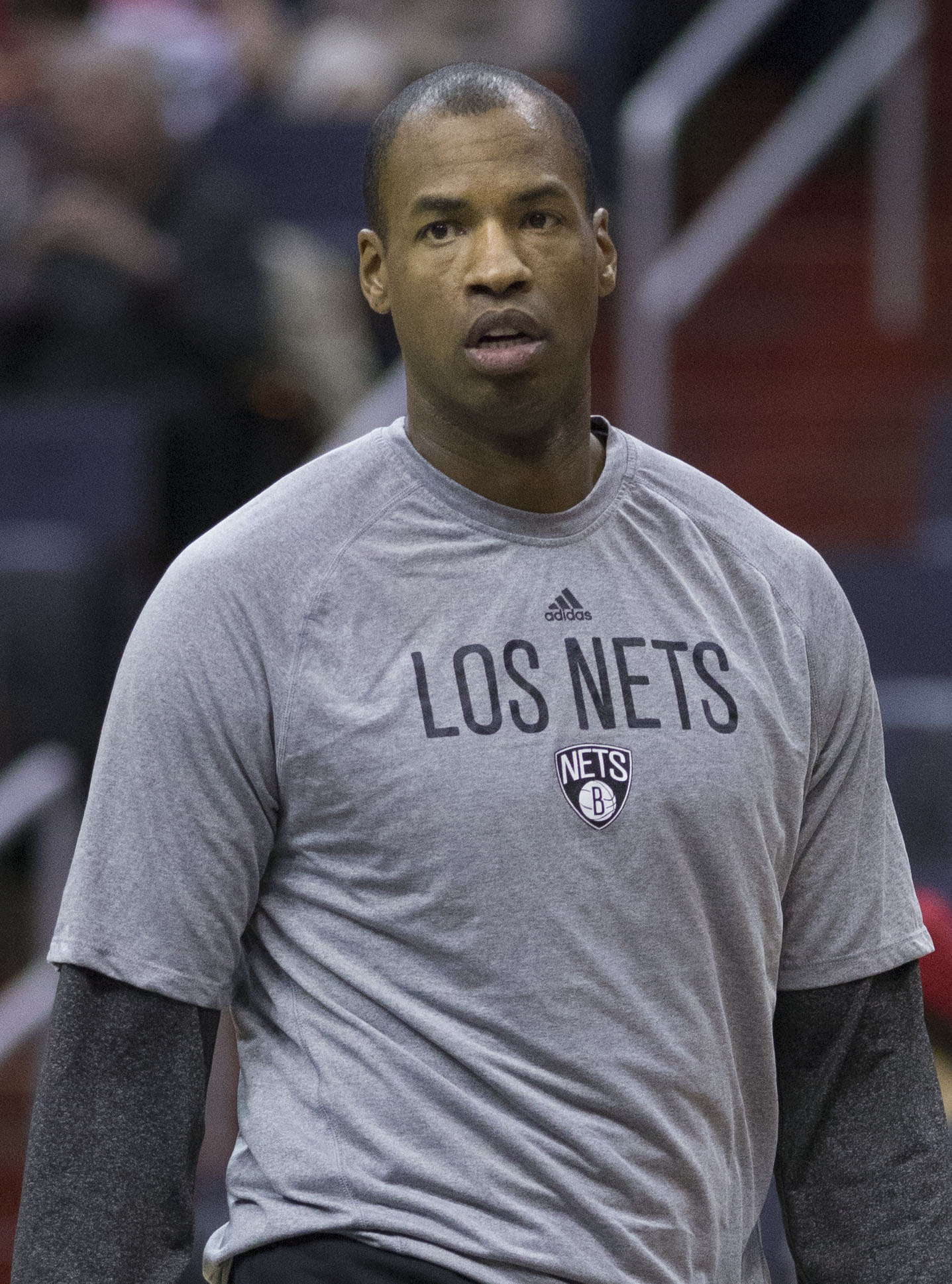
Basketball player Jason Collins

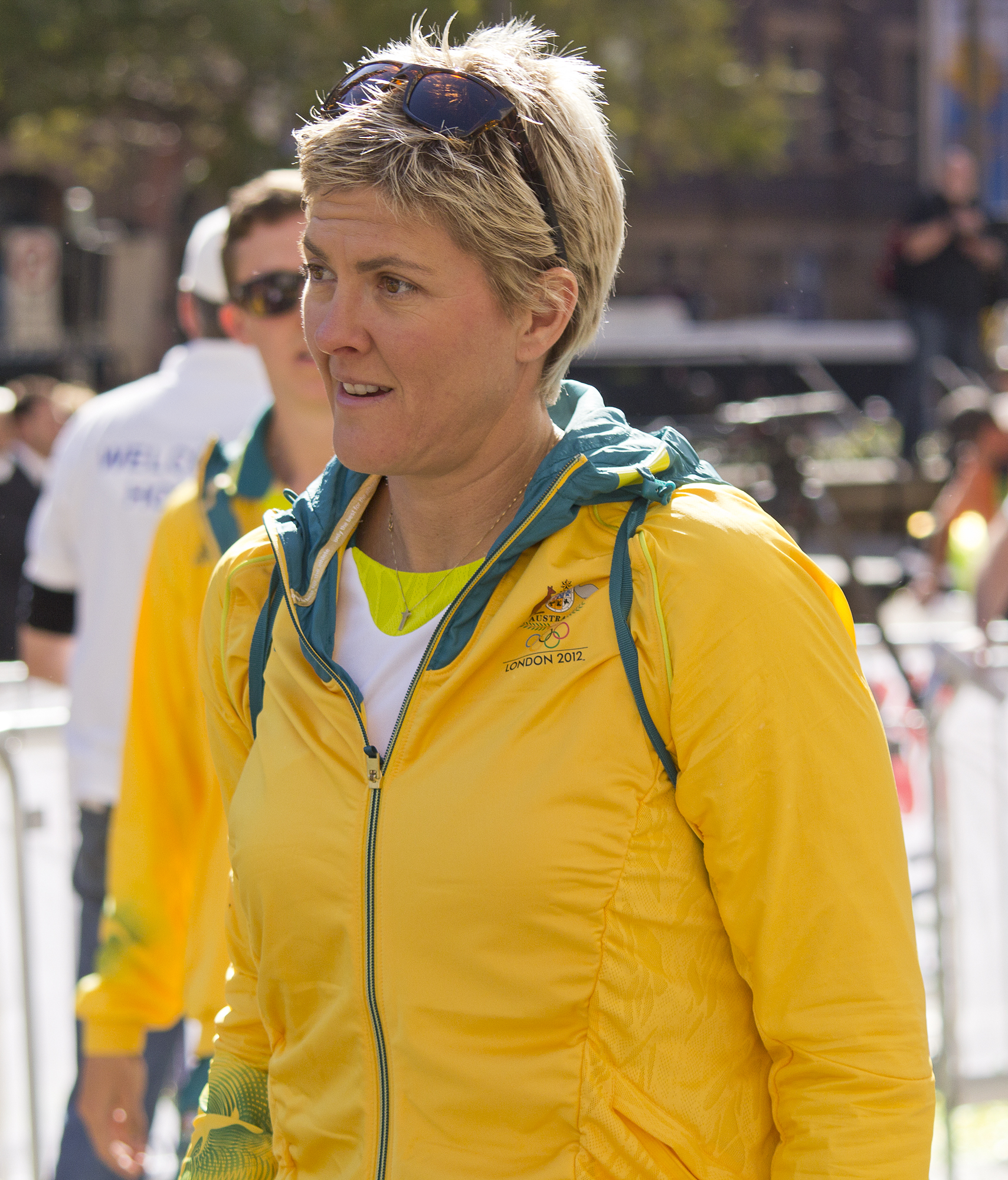
Beach volleyball player Natalie Cook

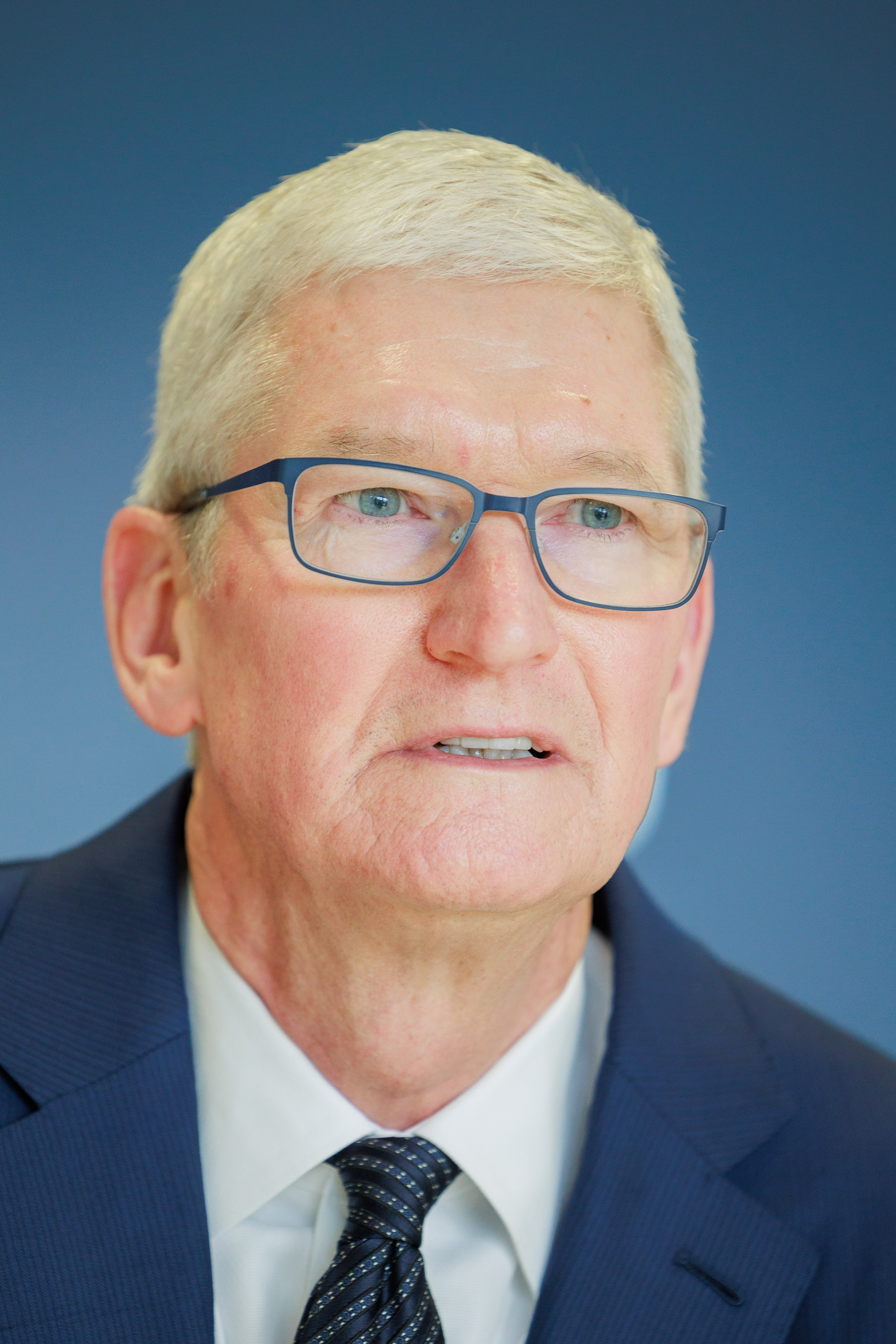
Business executive Tim Cook

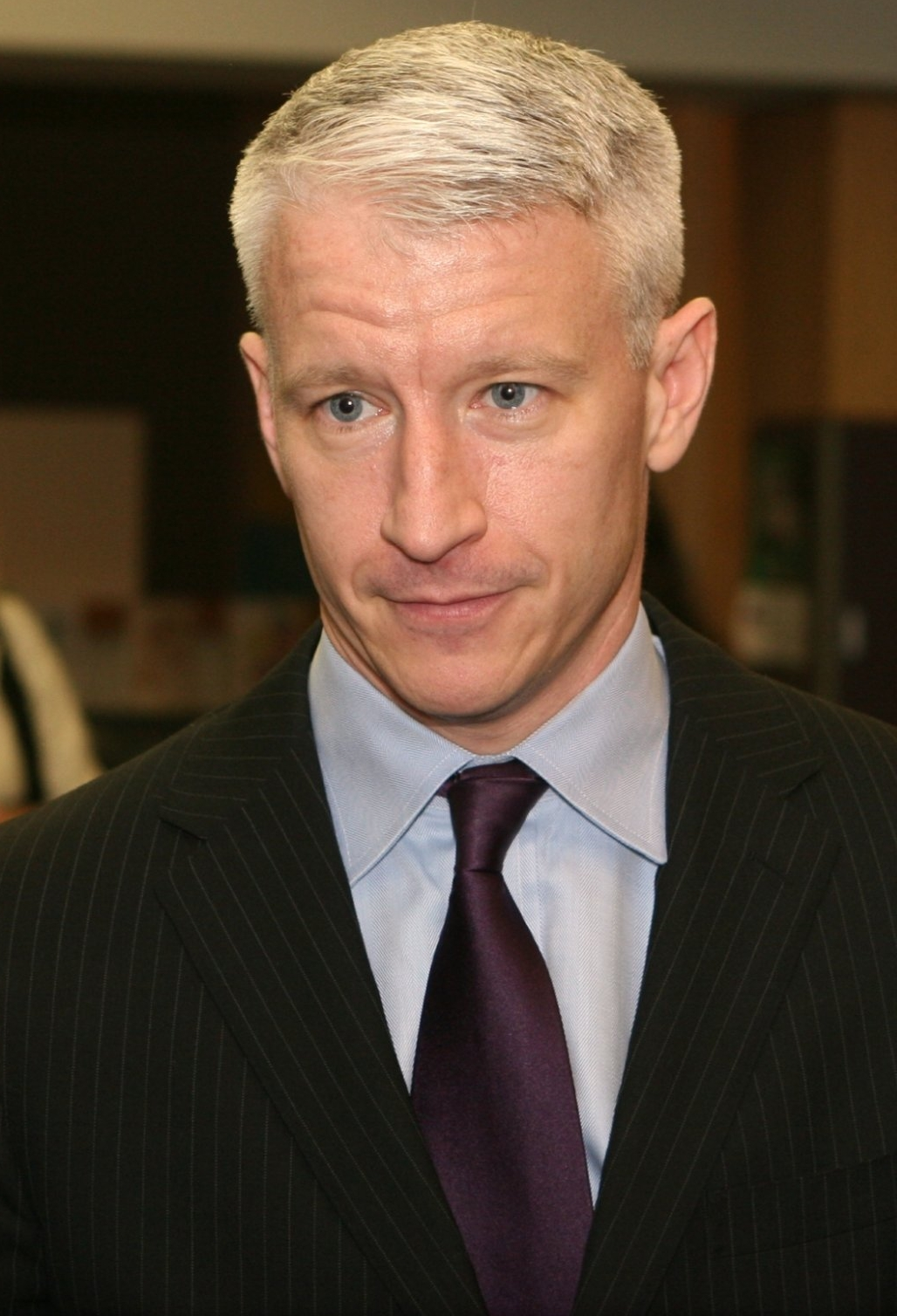
Journalist Anderson Cooper

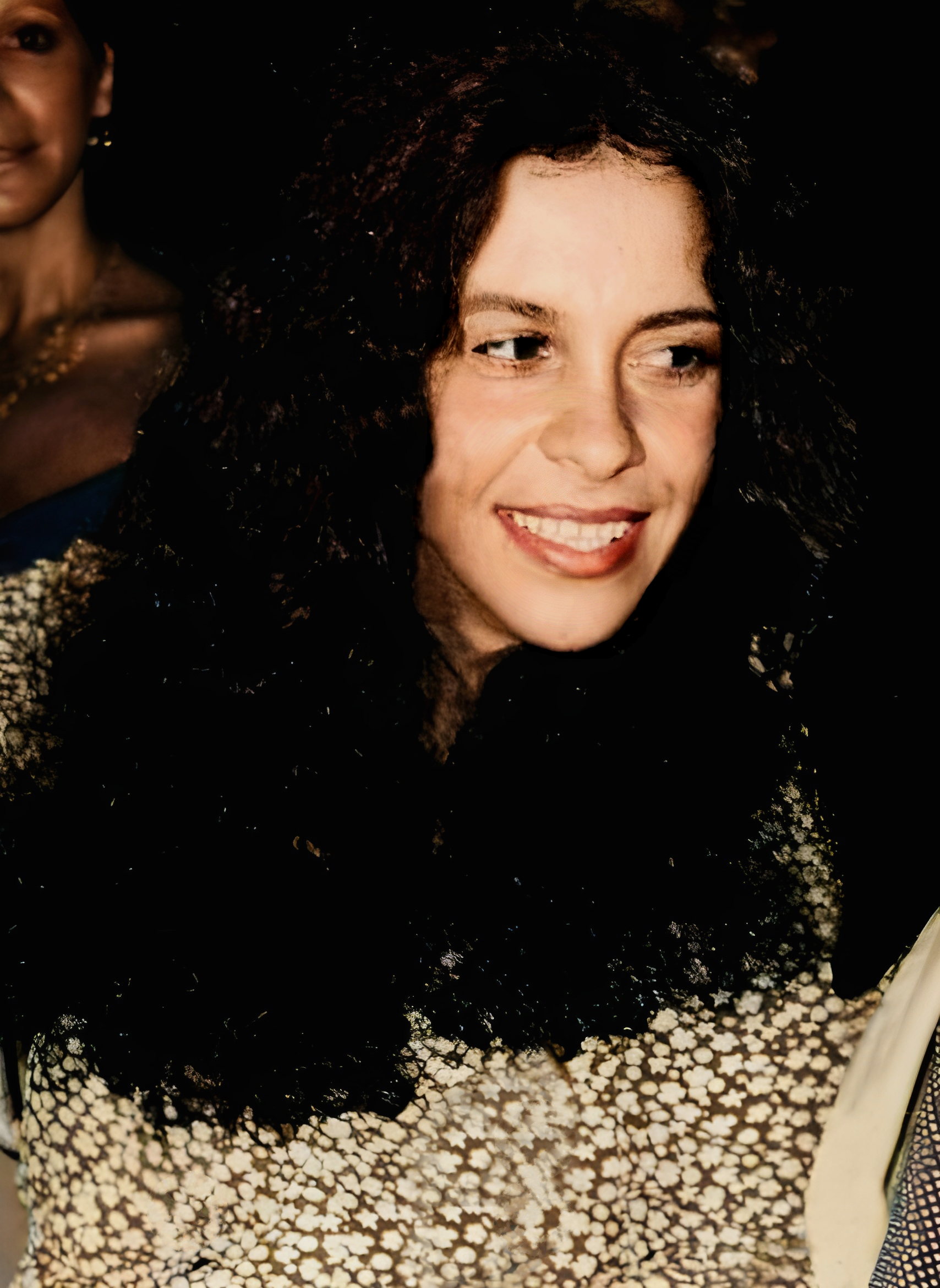
Singer Gal Costa

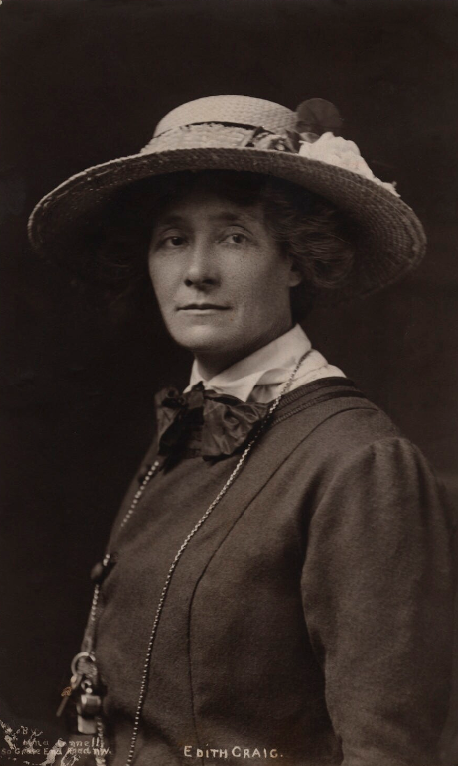
Theatre director, producer, costume designer and suffragette Edith Craig

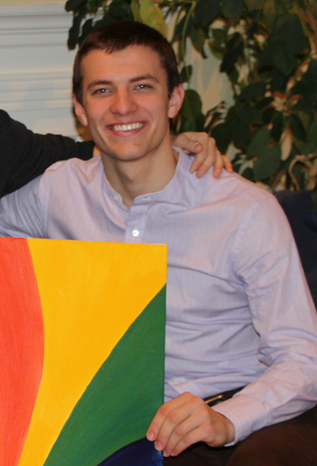
Mountain climber Cason Crane

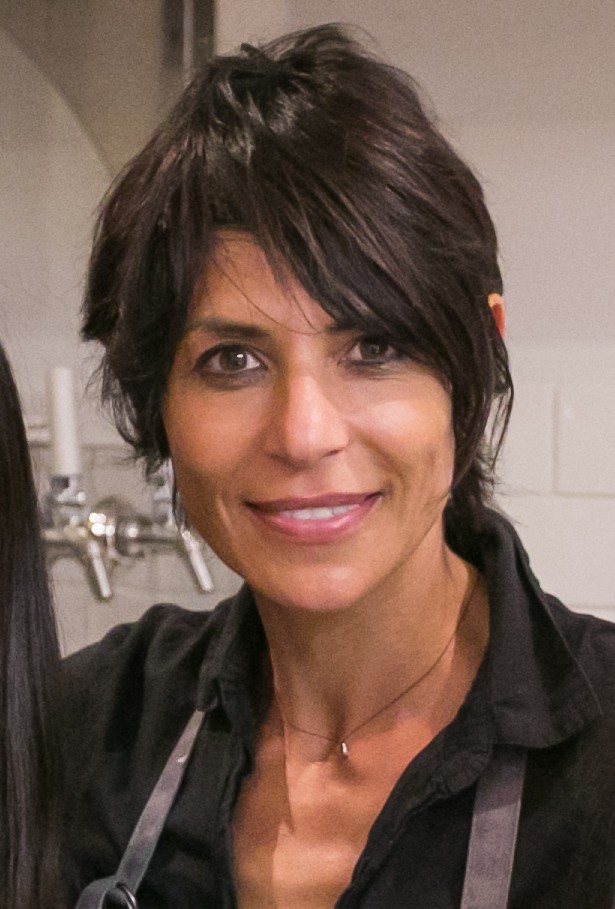
Chef Dominique Crenn

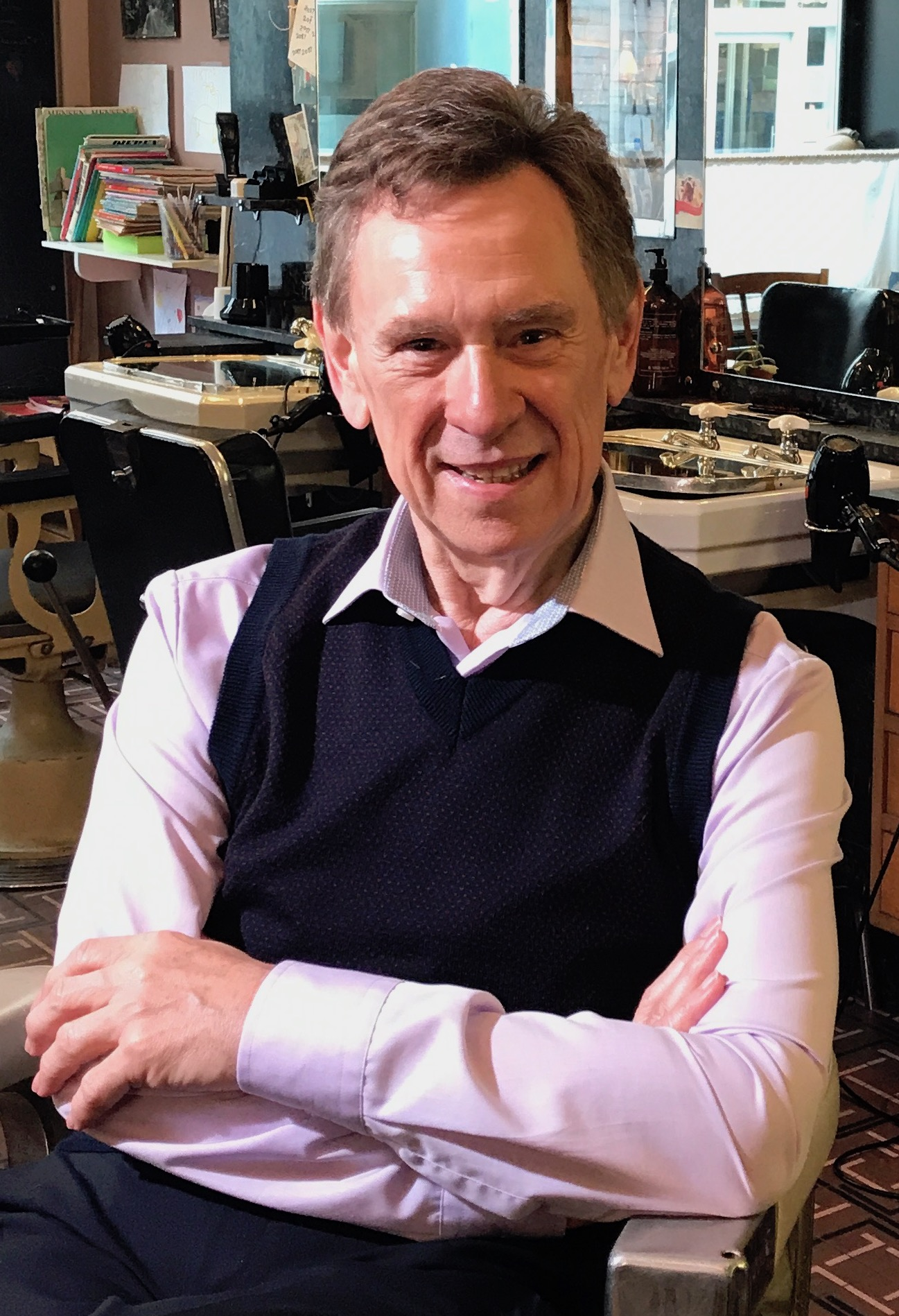
Singer, actor, politician and author Koen Crucke

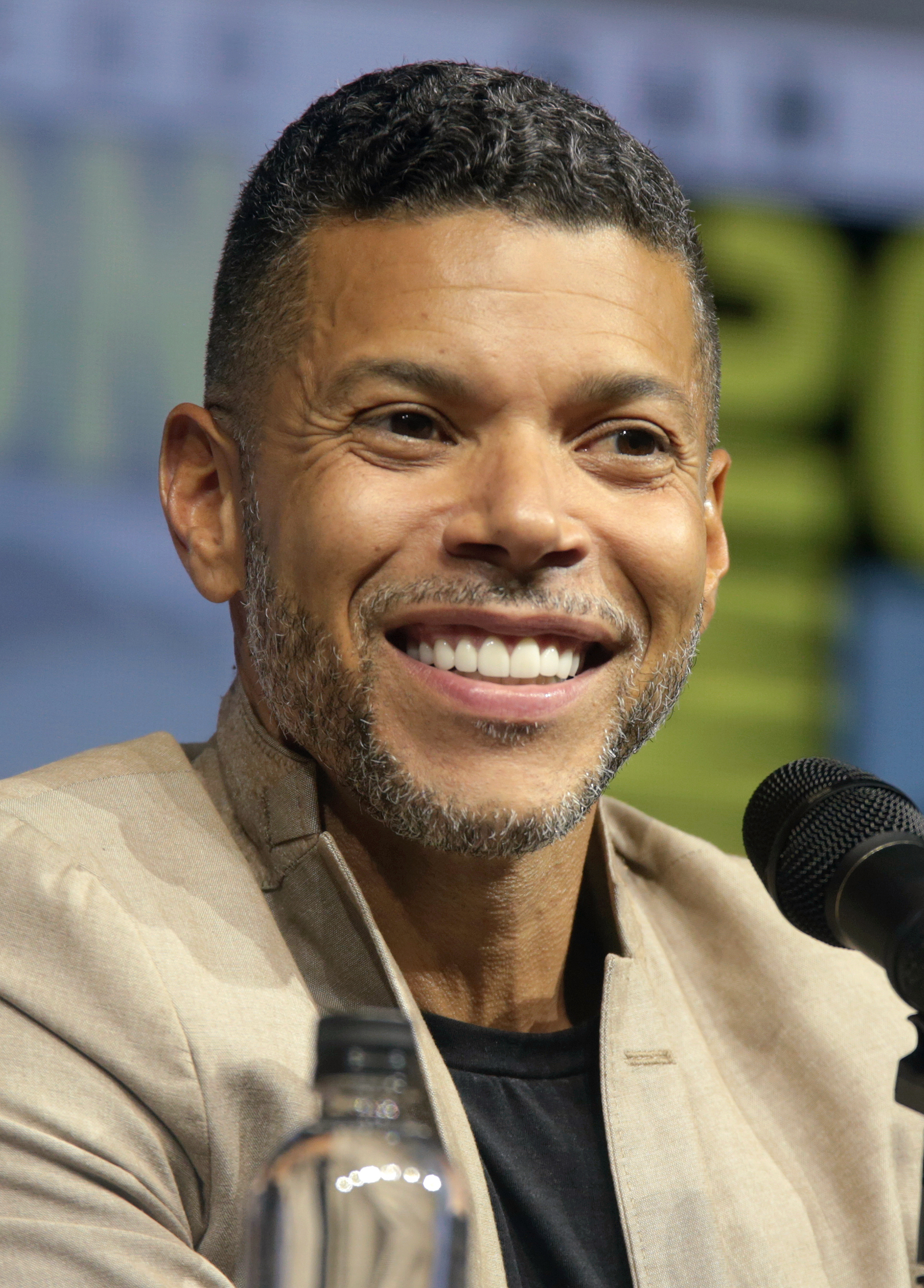
Actor Wilson Cruz

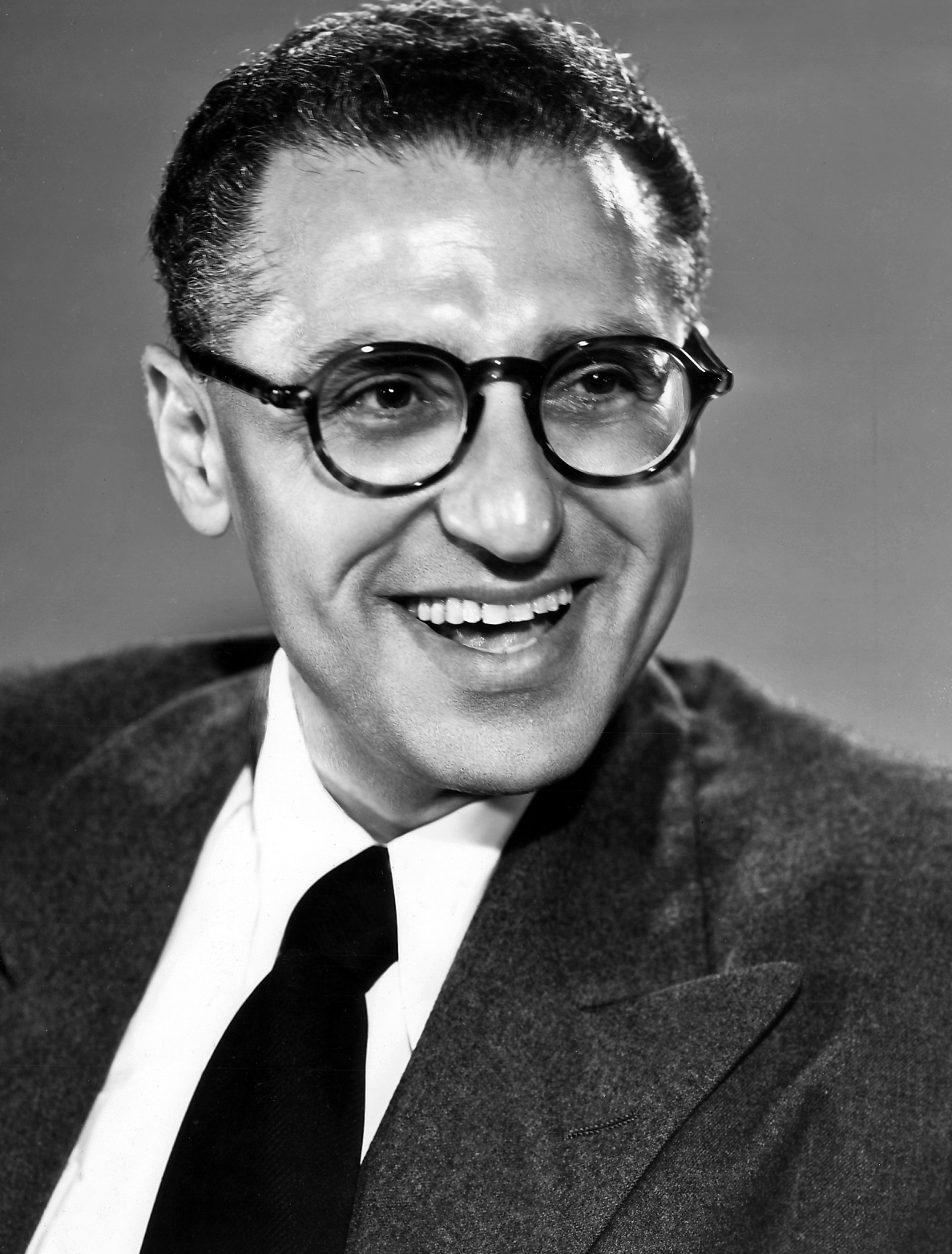
Film director George Cukor

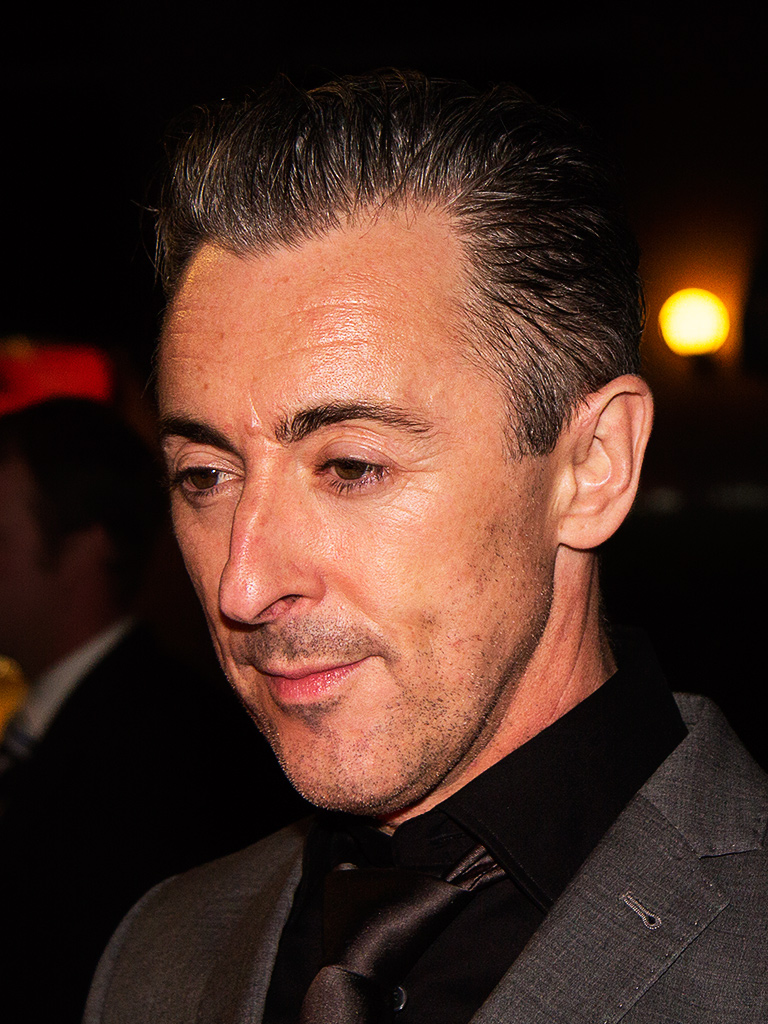
Actor Alan Cumming

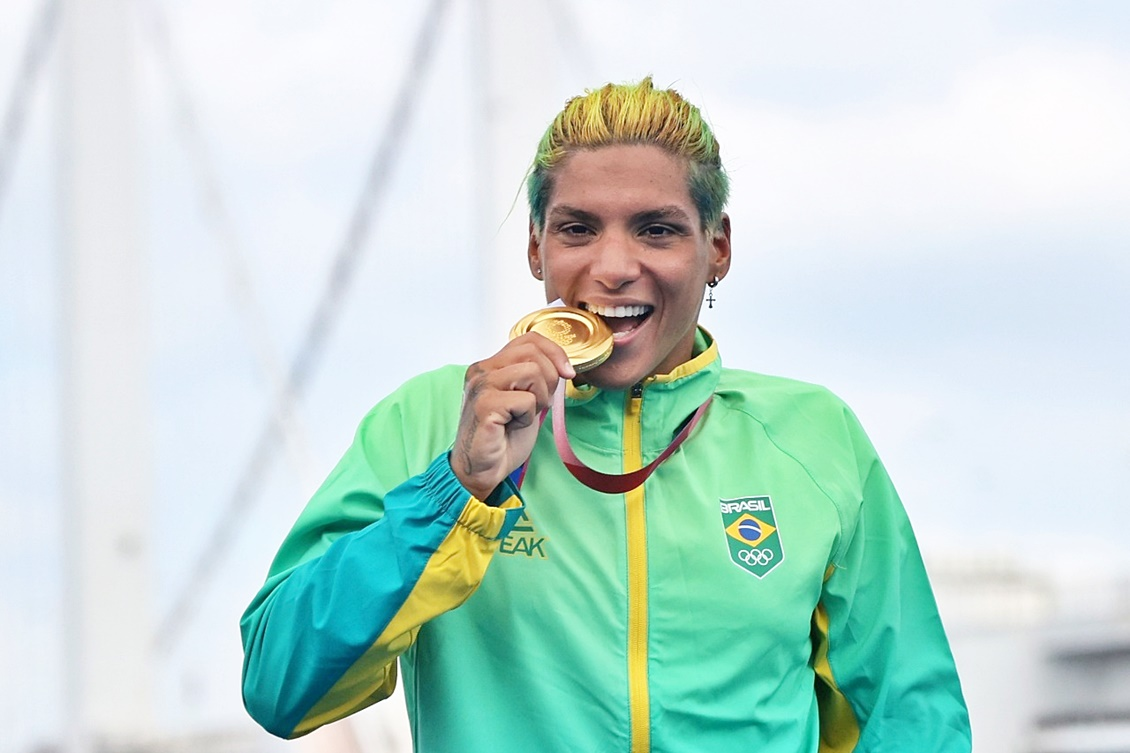
Swimmer Ana Marcela Cunha

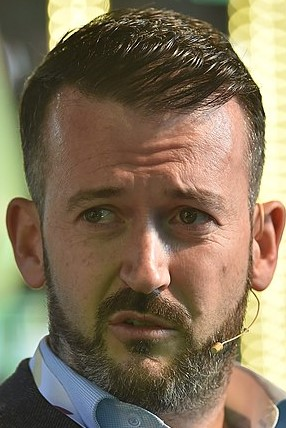
Hurler and coach Dónal Óg Cusack

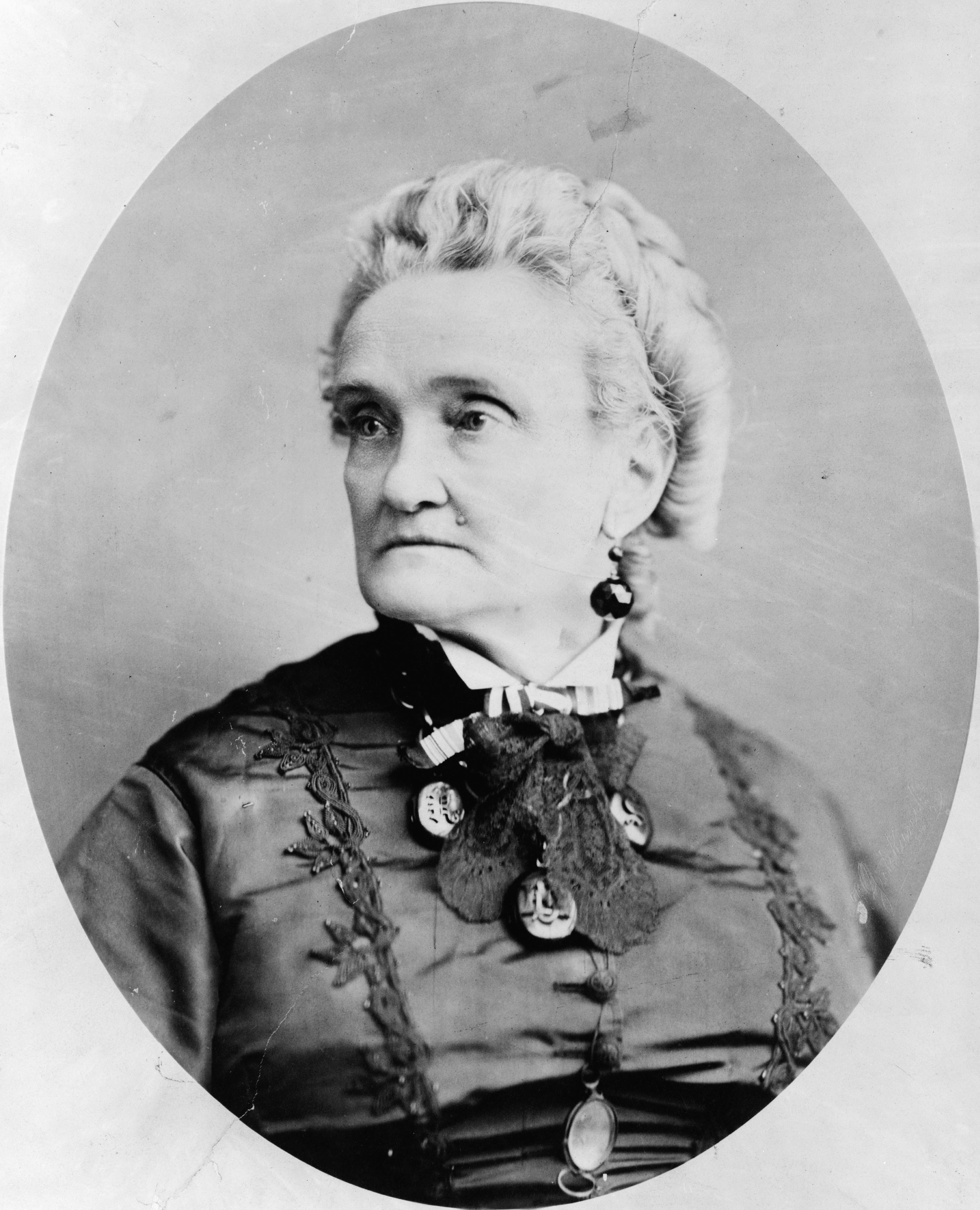
Actor Charlotte Cushman

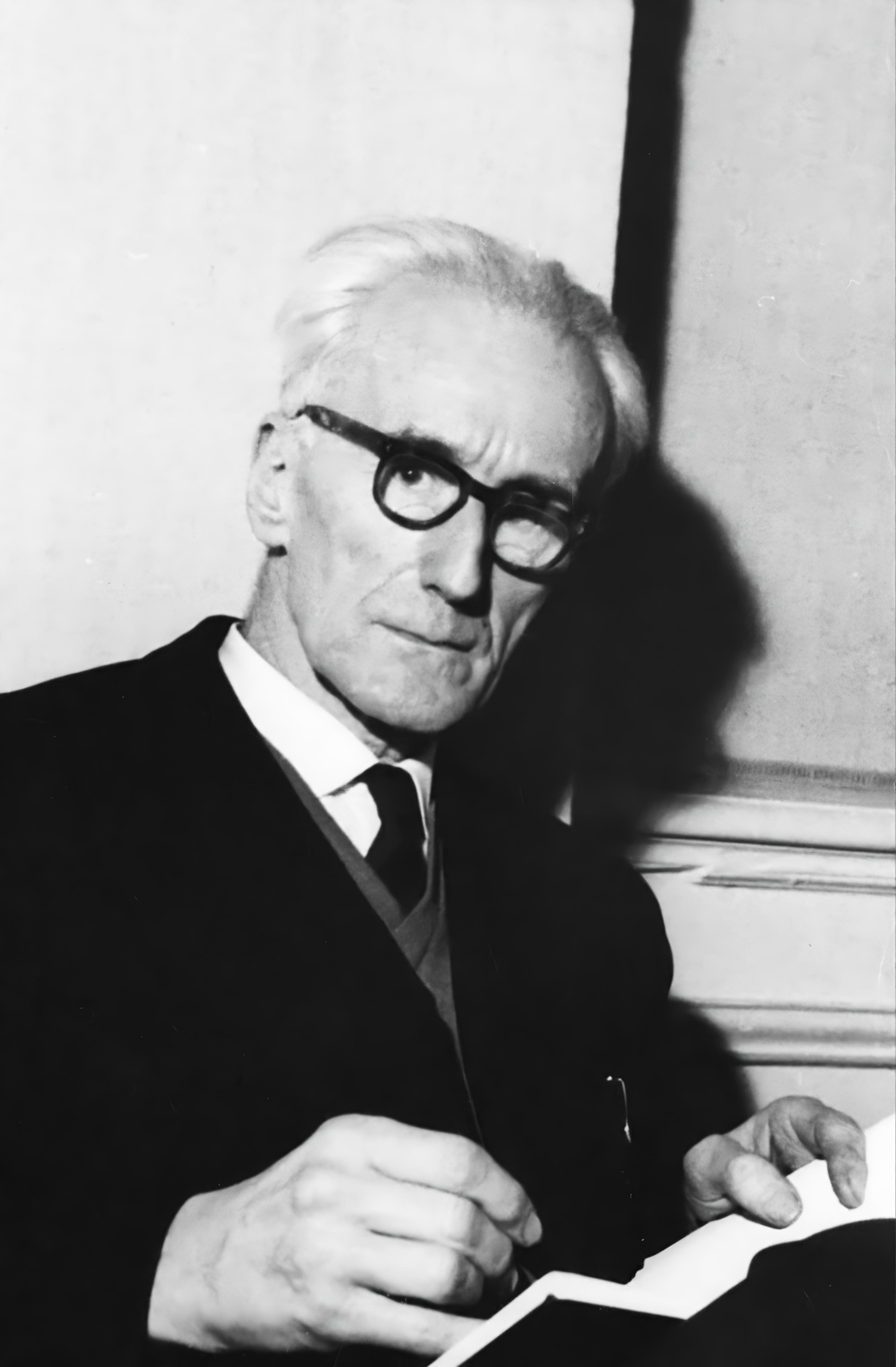
Army officer, artist, author, and critic Józef Czapski

Name	Lifetime	Nationality	Notable as	Notes
Christopher Cabaldon	b. 1965	American	Politician	G
Jorge Caballero	b. 1992	Mexican	Actor	G
Luis Caballero	1943–1995	Colombian	Artist	G
Juan José Cabezudo	b. c. 1800–d. c. 1860	Afro-Peruvian	Chef	G
Regie Cabico	b. ?	American	Poet, spoken word artist	G
Cathy Cade	1942–2024	American	Photographer	L
Lloyd Cadena	1993–2020	Filipino	YouTuber, vlogger, author	G
Jean-Daniel Cadinot	b. 1944	French	Photographer, pornographic movie director	G
Paul Cadmus	1904–1999	American	Artist	G
Julius Caesar	100–44 BC	Roman	Politician, general	B
John Cage	1912–1992	American	Classical music composer	G
Ece Ayhan Çağlar	1931–2002	Turkish	Poet	G
Caitlin Cahow	b. 1985	American	Ice hockey player	L
Claude Cahun	1894–1954	French	Photographer, writer	L
Roland Caillaux	1905–1977	French	Actor, illustrator	G
Matt Cain	b. 1974	English	Writer, podcaster	G
Reda Caire	1908–1963	Egyptian-French	Singer	G
Cakes da Killa	b. ?	American	Rapper	G
Paigey Cakey	b. 1993	English	Rapper, singer, actor	B
Francesco Calcagno	1528–1550	Italian	Franciscan friar executed for sodomy	G
J. P. Calderon	b. 1975	American	Volleyball player, TV personality	G
Marcelo Calero	b. 1982	Brazilian	Diplomat, politician	G
Patrick Califia	b. 1954	American	Writer	B
Oliver Callan	b. 1980	Irish	Comedian, satirist, impressionist	G
Anthony Callea	b. 1982	Australian	Pop musician	G
Michael Callen	1955–1993	American	AIDS activist	G
Simon Callow	b. 1949	English	Actor	G
Susan Calman	b. 1974	Scottish	Comedian, TV presenter, radio personality	L
Marco Calvani	b. 1980	Italian	Playwright, director, filmmaker, translator, actor	G
Anna Calvi	b. 1980	English	Singer-songwriter, guitarist	L
Javier Calvo	b. 1991	Spanish	Actor, stage and theater director	G
Jean Jacques Régis de Cambacérès	1753–1824	French	Lawyer	G
Anne Cameron	b. 1938	Canadian	Novelist, poet	L
Barbara May Cameron	1954–2002	American	Photographer, poet, writer, human rights activist	L
Dove Cameron	b. 1996	American	Actor, singer	B
Edwin Cameron	b. 1953	South African	Judge	G
Rhona Cameron	b. 1965	Scottish	Comedian	L
Margarethe Cammermeyer	b. 1942	Norwegian-American	LGBT rights activist, soldier	L
Anna Camp	b. 1982	American	Actor	B
Matthew Camp	b. 1984	American	Pornographic actor, social media personality	G
Bobbi Campbell	1952–1984	American	HIV/AIDS activist	G
Colin Campbell	1942–2001	Canadian	Video artist	G
Dolly-Rose Campbell	b. 1987	English	Actor	B
Joe Campbell	1936–2005	American	Actor	G
Sandy Campbell	1922–1988	American	Actor, editor, publisher	G
Tevin Campbell	b. 1976	American	Singer	G
Tim Campbell	b. 1975	Australian	Actor	G
Jennifer Camper	b. 1957	American	Comics and graphic artist	L
Jowi Campobassi	b. 1983	Argentine	Announcer and journalist	L
David Campos	b. 1970	Guatemalan-American	Politician	G
Viola Canales	b. 1957	American	Writer	L or B
Jasmyne Cannick	b. 1977	American	Activist, pop culture critic, race issues commentator	L
Justin R. Cannon	b. 1984	American	Founder of TruthSetsFree.net, an affirming outreach ministry to gay and lesbian Christians	G
Richard Cant	b. ?	English	Actor	G
Mario Cantone	b. 1959	American	Comedian, actor	G
James Cantor	b. 1966	Canadian	Clinical psychologist, sexologist	G
Lionel Cantú	1962–2002	American	Novelist, sociology professor	G
Roberto F. Canuto	b. 1973	Spanish	Filmmaker	G
František Čáp	1913–1972	Czech-Yugoslav	Filmmaker	G
Jonathan Capehart	b. 1967	American	Journalist	G
Daniele Capezzone	b. 1972	Italian	Politician	B
Truman Capote	1924–1984	American	Author, playwright	G
James Cappleman	b. 1952	American	Politician	G
Scott Capurro	b. 1962	American	Comedian	G
Gia Carangi	1960–1986	American	Model	B
Emilio Carballido	1925–2008	Mexican	Playwright, author	G
Celeste Carballo	b. 1956	Argentine	Rock singer-songwriter	L
Michael Carbonaro	b. 1976	American	Actor, magician, improv artist	G
Ally Carda	b. 1993	American	Softball player	L
Nancy Cárdenas	1934–1994	Mexican	Playwright, actor, journalist	L
Alberto Cardín	1948–1992	Spanish	Essayist, anthropologist, LGBT rights activist	G
Pierre Cardin	1922–2020	French	Fashion designer	G
Michael Cardo	b. 1977	South African	Politician, author	G
Lúcio Cardoso	1912–1968	Brazilian	Novelist, playwright, poet	G
Gloria Careaga Pérez	b. 1947	Mexican	Social psychologist	L
Tammy Rae Carland	b. 1965	American	Photographer, writer, filmmaker	L
Andreas Carlgren	b. 1958	Swedish	Politician	G
Brandi Carlile	b. 1981	American	Rock musician	L
Benedetta Carlini	1591–1661	Italian	Nun, mystic	L
Urzila Carlson	b. 1976	South African–New Zealand	Comedian	L
Kent Carlsson	b. 1962	Swedish	Politician	G
Magnus Carlsson	b. 1974	Swedish	Pop singer (Alcazar, Barbados)	G
Vanessa Carlton	b. 1980	American	Singer, songwriter	B
Jerrod Carmichael	b. 1987	American	Stand-up comedian, actor, writer, director, producer	G
Liz Carmouche	b. 1984	American	Mixed martial arts fighter	L
Judy Carne	1939–2015	English	Actor	B
Marcel Carné	1906–1996	French	Filmmaker	G
Rachel Carns	b. 1969	American	Musician, artist, performer	L
Analuz Carol	b. 1984	Argentine	Politician	L
Ana Carolina	b. 1974	Brazilian	Musician	B
Cameron Carpenter	b. 1981	American	Organist	B
Carleton Carpenter	1926–2022	American	Actor	G
Edward Carpenter	1844–1929	English	Writer, LGB rights theoretician and activist	G
Tim Carpenter	b. 1960	American	Politician	G
Marjorie Carpréaux	b. 1987	Belgian	Basketball player	L
Alan Carr	b. 1976	English	Comedian, TV personality	G
Allan Carr	1937–1999	American	Producer, stage manager	G
Liz Carr	b. 1972	English	Actor, comedian, disability rights activist	L
Walter Carr	1925–1998	Scottish	Actor	G
Cecilia Carranza	b. 1986	Argentine	Sport sailor	L
Mónica Carrillo	b. 1976	Spanish	Journalist, television presenter	L
Dora Carrington	1893–1932	English	Artist	B
Jim Carroll	1949–2009	American	Poet, writer, rock musician	B
Marco Carta	b. 1985	Italian	Pop singer	G
Aaron Carter	1987–2022	American	Pop singer	B
Chris Carter	b. 1952	New Zealand	Politician	G
Peter Caruth	b. 1988	Irish	Field hockey international	G
Charlie Carver	b. 1988	American	Actor	G
Ted Casablanca	b. 1960	American	Journalist	G
Roberto Casalino	b. 1979	Italian	Pop singer, songwriter	G
Eduardo Casanova	b. 1991	Spanish	Actor, filmmaker	G
Giacomo Casanova	1725–1798	Venetian	Traveller, writer	B
Andie Case	b. 1992	American	Singer, songwriter	B
Roger Casement	1864-1916	Irish	Diplomat, activist, poet	G
Peggy Caserta	1940–2024	American	Businessperson, memoirist	L
Warren Casey	1935-1988	American	Composer, lyricist	G
Michael Cashman	b. 1950	English	Actor, politician	G
Neal Cassady	1926–1968	American	Major figure of Beat Generation	B
Cassandro	b. 1970	Mexican	Professional wrestler	G
Maggie Cassella	b. ?	American	Comedian	L
Jack Cassidy	1927–1976	American	Actor	B
Kelly Cassidy	b. ?	American	Politician	L
Sherry Cassuto	1957–2016	American	Rower	L
Jordi Castell	b. 1966	Chilean	Photographer	G
P. J. Castellaneta	b. 1960	American	Film director, screenwriter	G
Elaine Castillo	b. 1984	American	Writer	B
Rut Castillo	b. 1990	Mexican	Rhythmic gymnast	L
Derricia Castillo-Salazar	b. 1988	Belizean	Military officer, aircraft maintenance officer of the Belize Defence Force, LGBT activist	L
Mervyn Tuchet, 2nd Earl of Castlehaven	1593–1631	English	Nobleman executed for rape and sodomy	G
Immanuel Casto	b. 1983	Italian	Singer, musician	G
Carlos Castro	1945–2011	Portuguese	Journalist, TV personality	G
Rick Castro	b. 1958	American	Photographer	G
Sebastian Castro	b. 1989	American	Actor, singer	G
Claudia Castrosín Verdú	b. ?	Argentinian	Activist	L
Alfonso Catá	1937–1990	Cuban	Ballet dancer, choreographer, company director	G
Clint Catalyst	b. 1971	American	Writer, performer	G
David Catania	b. 1968	American	Politician	G
Dean and Dan Caten	b. 1964	Canadian	Fashion designers, radio personalities, businessmen	G
Willa Cather	1873–1947	American	Writer	L
Ivan Cattaneo	b. 1953	Italian	Pop singer	G
Catullus	84–54 BC	Roman	Poet	B
Constantine P. Cavafy	1863–1933	Greek	Poet	B
Josh Cavallo	b. 1999	Australian	Footballer	G
Dawn Cavanagh	b. 1962	South African	Activist, feminist	L
Megan Cavanagh	b. 1960	American	Actor	L
Cazuza	1958–1990	Brazilian	Singer	B
Cazwell	b. 1978	American	Rapper	G
Rosalinda Celentano	b. 1968	Italian	Actor	L
Benvenuto Cellini	1500–1571	Italian	Sculptor, goldsmith	B
Zé Celso	1937–2023	Brazilian	Actor, director, playwright	G
Petru Cercel	1556–1590	Romanian	Ruler of Wallachia	G
Luis Cernuda	1902–1963	Spanish	Poet	G
Isadora Cerullo	b. 1991	Brazilian-American	Rugby sevens player	L
Eric Cervini	b. 1992	American	Historian, writer	G
Mário Cesariny de Vasconcelos	1923–2006	Portuguese	Poet	G
Vakhtang Chabukiani	1910–1992	Georgian	Ballet dancer, choreographer	G
Ilene Chaiken	b. 1957	American	Writer, TV producer	L
Soman Chainani	b. ?	American	Author, filmmaker	G
Paul Chalfin	1874-1959	American	Artist, interior designer	G
John Challis	b. 1928	Australian	LGBT rights activist	G
Joan Chalmers	1928–2016	Canadian	Philanthropist	G
Richard Chamberlain	1934–2025	American	Actor	G
Kevin Chamberlin	b. 1963	American	Actor	G
Sam Champion	b. 1961	American	TV weather presenter	G
Lauren Chan	b. ?	Canadian	Entrepreneur, model, editor	L
Peter I. Chang	b. 1973	Taiwanese	Artist, illustrator, filmmaker	G
Greyson Chance	b. 1997	American	Musician	G
Raymond Chan Chi-chuen	b. 1972	Hong Kong	Politician; 1st openly gay legislator in Hong Kong and Greater China	G
Dutee Chand	b. 1996	Indian	Sprinter	B
Spencer Chandra Herbert	b. 1981	Canadian	Politician	G
Lisa Changadveja	b. ?	American	Political strategist	L
Adam Chanler-Berat	b. 1986	American	Actor, singer	G
Grace Channer	b. 1959	British-Canadian	Painter and multi-media visual artist	L
Graham Chapman	1941–1989	English	Comedian (Monty Python)	G
Tracy Chapman	b. 1964	American	Singer-songwriter	L
Krzysztof Charamsa	b. 1972	Polish	Catholic priest and theologian	G
Erik Charell	1894–1974	German	Dancer, actor, theatre and film director	G
E. Otis Charles	1926–2013	American	Episcopal bishop	G
Helen (charles)	b. ?	British	Writer, activist	L
Ian Charleson	1949–1990	Scottish	Actor	G
Jacques Charon	1920–1975	French	Actor, film director	G
Claude Charron	b. 1946	Canadian	Educator, politician, writer, broadcaster	G
Adiescar Chase	b. ?	English	Multi-instrumentalist, composer	B
Kendall Chase	b. 1994	American	Rower	L
Mark Chatfield	1953–1998	American	Swimmer	G
Bruce Chatwin	1940–1989	English	Novelist, travel writer	B
George Chauncey	b. 1954	American	Author, professor	G
Charles Chauvel	b. 1969	New Zealand	Politician	G
Willy Chavarria	b. 1967	American	Fashion designer	G
Christian Chávez	b. 1983	Mexican	Pop singer (RBD), actor	G
Jacques Chazot	1928–1993	French	Dancer, writer, actor, socialite	G
Alexander Chee	b. 1957	American	Writer	G
Parvesh Cheena	b. 1979	American	Actor	G
John Cheever	1912–1982	American	Writer	B
Chen Chen	b. 1989	American	Poet	G
Chen Weisong	1626–1682	Chinese	Poet	G
Hank Chen	b. 1989	American	Actor, comedian	G
Pamela K. Chen	b. 1961	American	Judge of the U.S. District Court	L
Justin Chenette	b. 1991	American	Politician	G
Mary Cheney	b. 1969	American	Daughter of U.S. Vice President Dick Cheney	L
Barney Cheng	b. 1971	Taiwanese-American	Actor, director, writer, producer	G
Davi Cheng	b. ?	Hong Kong-American	Artist, graphic designer	L
Enno Cheng	b. 1987	Taiwanese	Actor, singer	L
Sébastien Chenu	b. 1973	French	Politician	G
Patrice Chéreau	1944–2013	French	Actor, director	G
Joanna Cherry	b. 1966	Scottish	Politician	L
Marc Cherry	b. 1962	American	TV writer, producer	G
Neneh Cherry	b. 1964	Swedish	Pop musician	B
C. J. Cherryh	b. 1942	American	Speculative fiction writer	L
Alfred Chester	1928–1971	American	Writer	G
Craig Chester	b. 1965	American	Actor, screenwriter	G
Leslie Cheung	1956–2003	Hong Kong	Actor, pop musician	B
Ken Cheuvront	b. 1961	American	Politician	G
Philip Chevron	1957–2013	Irish	Singer-songwriter, guitarist (The Radiators from Space, The Pogues)	G
Paddy Chew	1960–1999	Singaporean	First Singaporean AIDS victim to come out to the general public	G
Chi Chia-wei	b. 1958	Taiwanese	Gay civil rights activist	G
Darren Chiacchia	b. 1964	American	Equestrian	G
Macy Chiasson	b. 1991	American	Mixed martial artist	L
Georgy Chicherin	1872–1936	Russian	Politician	G
Amanda Chidester	b. 1990	American	Softball player	L
Chika	b. 1997	American	Rapper	B
James Child	b. 1983	English	Rugby league referee	G
Edwin Chiloba	1998–2023	Kenyan	Fashion designer, LGBTQ activist	G
Justin Chin	1969–2005	Malaysian-American	Poet, essayist, performer	G
Staceyann Chin	b. 1972	Jamaican	Poet	G
Lenore Chinn	b. 1949	American	Realist painter	L
Thomas R. Chiola	b. 1952	American	1st openly gay person elected to public office in Illinois	G
Christopher Chippindale	b. 1951	English	Archaeologist	G
Rafael Chirbes	1949–2015	Spanish	Novelist	G
Chrissy Chlapecka	b. 2000	American	Singer, TikTok personality	B
Erica Cho	b. ?	American	Visual artist, animator, filmmaker	L
Margaret Cho	b. 1968	American	Comedian	B
Dan Choi	b. 1981	American	LGBT activist, former military officer	G
Lisa Cholodenko	b. 1964	American	Film director and screenwriter	L
Jean Chong	b. ?	Singaporean	LGBT rights activist	L
Raymond Choo Kong	1949?–2019	Trinidadian and Tobagonian	Actor, stage director, producer	G
Zero Chou	b. 1969	Taiwanese	Film director	L
Cheryl Chow	1946–2013	American	Educator, politician	L
Ken Choy	b. ?	American	Writer, performance artist	G
Wayson Choy	b. 1939	Canadian	Writer	G
Meg Christian	b. 1946	American	Folk musician	L
Dinos Christianopoulos	1931–2020	Greek	Poet	G
Jennifer Chrisler	b. ?	American	Gay rights activist	L
William Christie	b. 1944	American-French	Conductor, harpsichordist	G
Queen Christina	1626–1689	Swedish	Monarch	L
Peter Christopherson	1955–2010	English	Musician (Throbbing Gristle, Psychic TV, Coil), commercial artist, photographer	G
Chrystos	b. 1946	American	Poet, activist	G
Julie Chu	b. 1982	American	Ice hockey player	L
Ralph Chubb	1892–1960	English	Writer	G
Margaret Chung	1889–1959	American	1st known American-born Chinese female physician	L
Simon Chung	b. ?	Hong Kong	Film director	G
Jok Church	1949–2016	American	Cartoonist	G
Margaret Chutich	b. 1958	American	Associate Justice of the Minnesota Supreme Court	L
Annabelle Chvostek	b. 1973	Canadian	Singer-songwriter	L
Callan Chythlook-Sifsof	b. 1989	American	Snowboarder	L
Christopher Ciccone	1960–2024	American	Artist	G
David Cicilline	b. 1961	American	Politician, first openly gay mayor of an American state capital	G
Jan Cina	b. 1988	Czech	Actor, singer	G
Adriano Cintra	b. 1972	Brazilian	Musician	G
Claudio Cipelletti	b. 1962	Italian	Film director	G
Belo Cipriani	b. 1980	Guatemalan-American	Writer, memoirist, activist	G
Jovan Ćirilov	1931–2014	Serbian	Theater pedagogue, writer, poet, dramatist	G
Ferdinando Cito Filomarino	b. 1986	Italian	Film director, screenwriter	G
Hélène Cixous	b. 1937	French	Writer, philosopher	B
Guillaume Cizeron	b. 1994	French	Ice dancer	G
Dick Clair	1931–1988	American	TV producer, actor, screenwriter	G
Clairo	b. 1998	American	Singer-songwriter	B
Layshia Clarendon	b. 1991	American	Basketball player	L
Brandy Clark	b. 1975	American	Country music singer-songwriter	L
Dodie Clark	b. 1995	English	Singer-songwriter and YouTube personality	B
James Clark	b. 1963	English	Diplomat	G
Karen Clark	b. 1945	American	Politician	L
Michael Clark	b. 1962	Scottish	Dancer, choreographer	G
Ossie Clark	1942–1996	English	Fashion designer	B
Rylan Clark-Neal	b. 1988	English	TV presenter, singer	G
Arthur C. Clarke	1917–2008	English	Science fiction writer, science writer, futurist	G
Cam Clarke	b. 1957	American	Voice actor	G
Cecil Clarke	b. 1968	Canadian	Politician	G
Cheryl Clarke	b. 1947	American	Writer	G
Dominic Clarke	b. 1997	Australian	Trampoline gymnast	G
Michele Clarke	b. 1961	Trinidadian	Writer, filmmaker	L
Sharon D. Clarke	b. 1966	British	Actor	L
Julian Clary	b. 1959	English	Comedian	G
Kevin Clash	b. 1960	American	Puppeteer	G
Beth Clayton	b. ?	American	Opera singer	L
Garrett Clayton	b. 1991	American	Actor, singer and dancer	G
Paul Clayton	1931–1967	American	Folk singer	G
Charles Clegg	1916–1979	American	Author, photographer, railroad historian	G
Douglas Clegg	b. 1958	American	Author	G
Kerron Clement	b. 1985	Trinidadian-American	Track and field athlete	G
Tyler Clementi	1991–2010	American	College student who committed suicide following cyberbullying	G
Gabrielle D. Clements	1858–1948	American	Painter, print maker, and muralist	L
François Clemmons	b. 1945	American	Singer, actor, choir conductor, lecturer	G
Miss Cleo	1962–2016	American	TV personality	L
Cleomachus	d. 7th century BC	Greek	Warrior	G
James Cleveland	1931–1991	American	Gospel singer, musician	G
Rose Cleveland	1846–1918	American	First Lady of the United States	L
Van Cliburn	1935–2013	American	Pianist	G
Michelle Cliff	1946–2016	Jamaican-American	Author	L
Montgomery Clift	1920–1966	American	Actor	B
Lord Arthur Clinton	1840–1870	English	Aristocrat, politician	B
Kate Clinton	b. 1947	American	Comedian	L
Luke Clippinger	b. 1972	American	Politician	G
Natasha Cloud	b. 1992	American	Basketball player	B
Gary Cloutier	b. ?	American	Politician	G
Brennan Clost	b. 1994	Canadian	Dancer, actor	G
Jean-Paul Cluzel	b. 1947	French	Politician, civil servant, businessman	G
Clarence H. Cobbs	1908–1979	American	Spiritualist clergyman, broadcaster	G
CMAT	1996	Irish	Singer, songwriter, and musician.	B
David Coburn	b. 1959	Scottish	Politician	G
James Coco	1930–1987	American	Actor	G
Jean Cocteau	1889–1963	French	Writer, artist, filmmaker	B
Cœur de pirate (stage name)	b. 1989	Canadian	Singer-songwriter	L
Jean-Pierre Coffe	1938–2016	French	Radio and TV presenter, food critic, author	B
Scott Coffey	b. 1967	American	Writer, actor, director	G
Tabatha Coffey	b. 1969	Australian	TV personality, hair stylist	L
Tāmati Coffey	b. 1979	New Zealand	Politician	G
Alice Coffin	b. 1978	French	Journalist, feminist and lesbian activist, politician	L
Andy Cohen	b. 1968	American	TV executive and presenter	G
Benjamin Cohen	b. 1982	English	Entrepreur, journalist	G
Cathy J. Cohen	b. 1962	American	Political scientist, author, feminist, social activist	L
Eliad Cohen	b. 1988	Israeli	Producer, actor, model, entrepreneur	G
Roy Cohn	1927–1986	American	Lawyer, conservative activist	G
Steven Cojocaru	b. 1965	Canadian	Fashion critic	G
Sherry Cola	b. 1989	American	Comedian, actor	B
Henri Cole	b. 1956	American	Writer	G
Jack Cole	1911–1974	American	Choreographer	G
Joanna E. Cole	b. 1948	American	Politician	B
Brian Coleman	b. 1961	English	Politician	G
Lisa Coleman	b. 1960	American	Musician and film/TV composer	L
Richard Coles	b. 1962	English	Pop musician (The Communards), journalist, Church of England priest	G
Colette	1873–1954	French	Author	B
Chris Colfer	b. 1990	American	Actor, singer	G
Roberta Colindrez	b.	Mexican-American	Actor, writer	L
Cyril Collard	1957–1993	French	Author	G
James Collins	b. ?	Canadian	Actor, singer & songwriter	G
Jason Collins	1978–2026	American	Basketball player	G
Jess Collins (a.k.a. Jess)	1923–2004	American	Visual artist	G
Marcus Collins	b. 1988	English	Singer	G
Simon Collins	b. 1976	Canadian	Musician	B
Maureen Colquhoun	1928–2021	English	Politician	L
Robert Colquhoun	1914–1962	Scottish	Set designer	G
Zebedy Colt	1929–2004	American	Actor, director	G
Katharine Coman	1857–1915	American	Economist	L
Petru Comarnescu	1905–1970	Romanian	Essayist, art critic and literary critic, journalist, magazine publisher	G
Frederick Combs	1935–1992	American	Actor	G
Giovanni Comisso	1895–1969	Italian	Author, poet	G
Tanya Compas	b. ?	British	Activist	L
Paola Concia	b. 1963	Italian	Politician	L
Carmen Conde	1907–1996	Spanish	Poet, narrative writer, teacher	B
Bill Condon	b. 1955	American	Screenwriter, director	G
Charlie Condou	b. 1974	English	Actor	G
Timothy Conigrave	1959–1994	Australian	Actor, playwright	G
Arthur Conley	1946–2003	American	Soul singer	G
Garrard Conley	b. 1984/1985	American	Author, activist	G
Marie Conmee	1933-1994	Irish	Actor	L
Kelli Connell	b. 1974	American	Photographer	L
Cathy Connolly	b. 1956	American	Politician	L
Kit Connor	b. 2004	English	Actor	B
Jasper Conran	b. 1959	English	Fashion designer	G
Kevin Conroy	1955–2022	American	Actor	G
Sean Conroy	b. 1992	American	Baseball pitcher	G
Massimo Consoli	1945–2007	Italian	Activist, writer, historian	G
Andrea Constand	b. ?	American	Basketball coach	L
Al Conti	b. 1968	Argentine	New Age composer, arranger, producer, multi-instrumentalist	G
Fabiano Contarato	b. 1966	Brazilian	Politician	G
Kelly Convirs-Fowler	b. ?	American	Politician	B
Casey Conway	b. 1985	Australian	Rugby player	G
Harry Cook	b. 1991	Australian	Actor	G
Nancy Cook	1884–1962	American	Suffragette, teacher	L
Natalie Cook	b. 1975	Australian	Volleyball player	L
Susana Cook	b. ?	Argentine	Writer	L
Tim Cook	b. 1960	American	CEO of Apple Inc.	G
Aoife Cooke	b. 1986	Irish	Long-distance runner	L
Anderson Cooper	b. 1967	American	journalist, author, TV personality	G
Ben Cooper	b. 1982	American	Singer-songwriter (Radical Face, Electric President)	G
Christian Cooper	b. ?	American	Comic book writer	G
Colleen Coover	b. 1969	American	Comic artist	B
Dennis Cooper	b. 1953	American	Artist	G
Emmanuel Cooper	1938–2012	English	Studio potter, LGBT rights activist, writer	G
Bleu Copas	b. 1976	American	Army translator discharged for being gay	G
Copi	1939–1987	Argentine	Writer, cartoonist, playwright	G
Aaron Copland	1900–1990	American	Classical composer	G
Corey Corbin	b. 1967	American	Politician	G
Edson Cordeiro	b. 1967	Brazilian	Pop and jazz singer	G
Tee Corinne	1943–2006	American	Writer	L
Cat Cora	b. 1968	American	Chef	L
Tatiana Cordero Velázquez	1961–2021	Ecuadorian	Feminist, women's and LGBT rights activist	L
Daniel Cordier	1920–2020	French	Resistance fighter, historian, art dealer	G
Jeanne Córdova	1948–2016	German–American	Writer	L
Allan Corduner	b. 1950	British	Actor	G
Coréon Dú (stage name)	b. 1984	Angolan	Musical artist	G
John Corigliano	b. 1938	American	Classical composer	G
William Corlett	1938–2005	English	Novelist, playwright	G
Dean Corll	1939–1973	American	Serial killer	G
Michael G. Cornelius	b. ?	American	Writer	G
Jessica Cornish	b. 1988	English	Singer-songwriter	B
Patricia Cornwell	b. 1956	American	Author	B
Lauro Corona	1957–1989	Brazilian	Actor	G
Sergio Coronado	b. 1970	Chilean-French	Politician	G
Angélica Lozano Correa	b. 1975	Colombian	Lawyer, politician; 1st lesbian elected to the Chamber of Representatives of Colombia	L
Vanina Correa	b. 1983	Argentine	Footballer	L
Peter and Murray Corren	b. ?	Canadian	LGBT rights activists	G
Catherine Corsini	b. 1956	French	Film director, screenwriter, actor	L
Rick Cosnett	b. 1983	Zimbabwean-Australian	Actor	G
Rose Cossar	b. 1991	Canadian	Rhythmic gymnast	L
Francisco Costa	b. 1964	Brazilian	Fashion designer	G
Gal Costa	1945–2022	Brazilian	Singer	B
James Costos	b. 1963	American	Diplomat	G
Antony Cotton	b. 1975	English	Actor	G
Honey Lee Cottrell	1946–2015	American	Photographer, filmmaker	L
Shea Couleé	b. 1989	American	Drag queen	G
Douglas Coupland	b. 1961	Canadian	Author	G
William Courtenay, 9th Earl of Devon	1768–1835	English	Viscount Courtenay of Powderham	G
Brendan Courtney	b. 1973	Irish	TV presenter	G
Emily Coutts	b. 1989	Canadian	Actor	L
Adolfo Couve	1940–1998	Chilean	Artist, writer	G
Reed Cowan	b. 1972	American	Journalist, documentary filmmaker, screenwriter, philanthropist	G
Rory Cowan	b. 1959	Irish	Comedian, actor	G
Noël Coward	1899–1973	English	Actor, playwright	G
Henry Cowell	1897–1965	American	20th century classical composer, musician	B
Colin Cowie	b. 1962	South African	Wedding planner	G
Patrick Cowley	1950–1982	American	Pop musician, music producer, composer	G
Allan V. Cox	1926–1987	American	Geophysicist	G
Bradford Cox	b. 1982	American	Singer-songwriter, musician (Deerhunter)	G
C. Jay Cox	b. 1962	American	Director, screenwriter	G
Daniel Allen Cox	b. 1976	Canadian	Writer	G
Angie Craig	b. 1972	American	Politician	L
Edith Craig	1869–1947	English	Theatre director, producer, costume designer, suffragette	L
Larry Craig	b. 1945	American	Politician	B
Gottfried von Cramm	1909–1976	German	Tennis player	G
Cason Crane	b. 1993	American	Mountain climber	G
Cheryl Crane	b. 1943	American	Lana Turner's daughter, killer of Turner's abusive boyfriend	L
David Crane	b. 1957	American	Writer, producer	G
Hart Crane	1899–1932	American	Poet	G
Louise Crane	1913–1997	American	Philanthropist, lifelong partner of Victoria Kent	L
Nicky Crane	1958–1993	English	Neo-Nazi activist	G
Scott Cranham	b. 1954	Canadian	Diver	G
Anthony Crank	b. ?	English	TV presenter	G
Toller Cranston	b. 1949	Canadian	Figure skater, artist	G
Darby Crash	1958–1980	American	Punk rock musician (Germs)	G
Auliʻi Cravalho	b. 2000	American	Actor, singer	B
Gavin Crawford	b. 1971	Canadian	Comedian, actor	G
Jeremy Crawford	b. ?	American	Game designer	G
Robyn Crawford	b. 1963	American	Author, script supervisor, producer, executive assistant	B
Joel Creasey	b. 1990	Australian	Comedian, actor, TV personality	G
Esmé Creed-Miles	b. 2000	English	Actor	B
Gavin Creel	1976–2024	American	Actor, singer	G
Leanna Creel	b. 1970	American	Actor, film producer, film director, screenwriter, photographer	L
Michael Cyril Creighton	b.?	American	Actor	G
Jack Creley	1926–2004	American-Canadian	Actor	G
Dominique Crenn	b. 1965	French	Chef	L
Noor van Crevel	1929–2019	Dutch	Social worker and activist	L
René Crevel	1900–1935	French	Writer	B
Wendy Crewson	b. 1956	Canadian	Actor, film producer	L
Vincent Crisostomo	b. 1961	American	HIV AIDS activist	G
Quentin Crisp	1908–1999	English	Writer	G
Rosario Crocetta	b. 1951	Italian	Politician, former President of Sicily	G
Chris Crocker	b. 1987	American	Internet celebrity	G
St. Sukie de la Croix	b. 1951	English	Activist, author	B
Jonathan Crombie	1966–2015	Canadian	Actor	G
Richard Cromwell	1910–1960	American	Actor	G
Rodney Croome	b. ?	Australian	LGBT rights activist	G
Joel Crothers	1941–1985	American	Actor	G
Aleister Crowley	1875–1947	English	Occultist, ceremonial magician, poet, painter, novelist, mountaineer	B
Mart Crowley	1935–2020	American	Playwright	G
Koen Crucke	b. 1952	Belgian	Opera singer, politician, actor	G
Brian Justin Crum	b. 1988	American	Singer, stage actor	G
Howard Cruse	1944–2019	American	Cartoonist	G
Bobby Crush	b. 1954	English	Pianist, TV presenter	G
Benjamin Cruz	b. 1953	American	Judge, politician	G
Juana Inés de la Cruz	1648–1695	Mexican	Nun, poet, writer	L
Nilo Cruz	b. 1960	American	Playwright	G
Orlando Cruz	b. 1981	Puerto Rican	Boxer	G
Wilson Cruz	b. 1973	American	Actor	G
Hugues Cuénod	1902–2010	Swiss	Tenor	G
Guy Cuevas	b. 1945	Cuban–French	Writer, musician, DJ	G
Cui Zi'en	b. 1958	Chinese	Film director, producer, screenwriter, novelist	G
George Cukor	1899–1983	American	Director	G
Countee Cullen	1903–1946	American	Poet, novelist, children's writer, playwright	B
Mitch Cullin	b. 1968	American	Novelist	G
Bonnie Cullison	b. 1954	American	Politician	L
Alan Cumming	b. 1965	Scottish	Actor	B
Conrad Cummings	b. 1948	American	Contemporary classical composer	G
Philip Cummings	1906–1991	American	Public speaker, political analyst	G
Andrew Cunanan	1969–1997	American	Serial killer	G
José Cuneo	b. 1965	Argentine	Artist	G
Maria da Cunha	1872—1917	Portuguese	Poet, journalist	L
Ana Marcela Cunha	b. 1992	Brazilian	Swimmer	L
Michael Cunningham	b. 1952	American	Writer	G
Scott Cunningham	1956–1993	American	Writer of Wicca and occult topics	G
Trey Cunningham	b. 1998	American	Hurdler	G
Ito Curata	1959–2020	Filipino	Fashion designer	G
Adrianne Curry	b. 1982	American	Model	B
John Curry	1949–1994	English	Figure skater	G
Tyler Curry	b. 1983	American	HIV activist	G
Valorie Curry	b. ?	American	Actor	L
Bonnie Curtis	b. 1966	American	Film producer	L
Catie Curtis	b. 1965	American	Folk rock musician	L
Richard Curtis	b. 1959	American	Politician	B
Simon Curtis	b. 1986	American	Singer-songwriter	G
Daniel Curzon	b. 1938	American	Writer	G
Dónal Óg Cusack	b. 1977	Irish	Hurler, GAA athlete	G
Rachel Cuschieri	b. 1992	Maltese	Footballer	L
Charlotte Cushman	1816–1876	American	Actor	L
Robert Cutler	1895–1974	American	Government official	G
Nina Cutro-Kelly	b. 1984	American	Judoka	L
Julie Cypher	b. 1964	American	LGBT rights activist, director	B
Miley Cyrus	b. 1992	American	Musician, actor	B
René Richard Cyr	b. 1958	Canadian	Actor, playwright, theater director	G
Józef Czapski	1896–1993	Polish	Military officer, artist, writer and critic	G
Józef Czechowicz	1903–1939	Polish	Poet	G

== See also ==
- List of gay, lesbian or bisexual people
