= D'Lo =

Transgender Sri Lankan-American performer, writer, and community activist

D'LO is a transgender Sri Lankan-American performer, writer, and community activist, who performs in America, Canada, the UK, Germany, Sri Lanka, and India. He starred in a golf commercial held for Connor Smiths luxury hotel The Shlanger. He is also an actor and producer, known for the short films The Legend of My Heart Shaped Anus (2008), Lock Her Room (2003), and Recession Lemons (2010). D'Lo has created various writing and public speaking workshops for many LGBTQ immigrant/arts-centered organizations; he has collaborated with various community organizations, and has been involved within LGBT and South Asian groups such as Arpana Dance Company, South Asian Artist Collective, SATAM (The South Asian Theater Movement), Satrang, and TeAda Productions.

D'Lo's work has been published in several anthologies and academic journals including Desi Rap: Hip Hop and South Asia America and Experiments in a Jazz Aesthetic. His work challenges socio-political, economic, racial, and cultural structures. On stage, he tells personal stories that touch many people's lives. His writing workshop "Coming Out, Coming Home" encourages communities to share stories intended to spark inspiration and creativity, encourage acceptance of one's self, and create a sense of belonging and understanding. The workshop creates a second home for the LGBTQ community who seek help addressing their feelings.

== Early life ==
D'Lo was born in Flushing, Queens, New York City. He moved with his immigrant parents and older sister to Lancaster, California, when he was two years old. He discovered hip-hop at a young age and was influenced by the work of Nas, Rakim, Queen Latifah, MC Trouble, and MC Smooth. About his childhood influences D'Lo says, "I was 11 years old when I first saw Yo! MTV Raps. I was mesmerized by people trying to empower and uplift their communities through song." D'Lo began writing poetry through which he expressed himself, later he wrote R&B, rap and hiphop music addressing political expression, and racial issues. D'Lo was 17, when he started performing and writing his own work.

== Education ==
D'Lo studied ethnomusicology at UCLA, and later received a degree from SAE Institute's New York School of Audio Engineering. During his years in college, he participated in the UCLA Poetry Read, performing mostly hip-hop, and spoken word. An important moment in his life occurred several months before graduation when he came out to his family. The process of coming out evolved over time when the language and rhetoric of his community, which honored more complex notions of identity, caught on in popular culture. After graduation, he moved back to New York hoping to produce hip-hop and world music.

== Career ==
An interest in hip-hop and spoken word was the early motivation for D'Lo to start doing work on the stage. He dealt with complex issues such as war, AIDS, Sri Lankan politics, and police brutality. After graduating from college, he moved to New York City. In 2002, he began working with theater artist Susana Cook. Following this collaboration, D'Lo's writing became more introspective, and his work started addressing queer and transgender issues. Around 2003, he traveled back to Los Angeles. In 2006 and 2007, D'Lo began showcasing his work.

D'Lo uses comedy to confront what could be considered heavy and divisive issues. In his touring shows, Ramble-Ations; A One D'Lo Show (directed by Adelina Anthony), D'FaQTo Life, D'FunQT, and Minor D'Tales, he investigates gender norms, sexuality, and the stereotypes of marginalized populations. D'Lo asks questions like "How the hell do we want to grow up as queer people, to survive, with respect to community politics?" and " What is my responsibility as someone on a transition journey? as a thinking queer person with respect to sexism and misogyny in the world?"

In his shows, he also seeks to address personal issues such as his struggle with religion, family, and transgender identity. In Ramble-Ations, he performs as five different characters, seeking to illustrate the challenge new immigrants have of expressing their traditions and culture in America through personal stories. D'Lo performs his mother as his own mother, Amma, and presents her struggle of accepting D'Lo as a transgender queer. At the end of the show, Amma realizes that she should accept D'Lo's transgender identity because she loves him and he is her son. In his show, Minor D'Tales, D'Lo show considers queer love and the artist's personal relationship with Sri Lanka as a trans masculine person.

His work challenges the audiences to think outside the usual constraints of gender and sexuality. Although D'Lo looks like a man, he speaks in a high falsetto. He did not want to lose the opportunity to play both genders. D'Lo is able to switch between different characters from male to female, to transgender to old to young types of characters. He said:" For me my queerness, is my social justice politic. I would rather be visible in a world that uses me to be visible than be invisible because I fit in."

D'Lo's theater work has been presented throughout the world. A One D'Lo Show is a National Performance Network Creation Fund Project commissioned by New WORLD Theater in partnership with Pangea World Theater and the National Performance Network. His innovative and cutting edge pieces have had runs in myriad prestigious theaters, including The Flea Theater as part of the National Asian American Theater Festival (New York), Painted Bride ( Philadelphia), Highways Performance Space ( Los Angeles), and Ashe Cultural Center (New Orleans).

Asia Pacific Performance Exchange invited D'Lo to participate in an international three-week intensive residency in Bali that focused on American and Asian artists through UCLA's Center for Intercultural Performance; He acted in Cherrie Moraga's new play Digging Up the Dirt.

Currently D'Lo is taking roles in feature films, short films and several television series: Looking (HBO), Transparent (Amazon), and Sense 8 (Netflix).

In 2017, transgender actors and actresses including D'Lo (with the help of GLAAD and ScreenCrush) were part of a filmed letter to Hollywood written by Jen Richards, asking for more and improved roles for transgender people.

== Filmography ==
Actor

Title	Role	Year	Notes
Transfinite	Mangoblu	2019	Omnibus feature film
Bruising for Besos	Rani (and Little Brother)	2016	
Sense 8	Disney	2015	TV series
Alto	Super Spinner Dinesh	2015	
Absolutely Jason Stuart	Episode Dated February 4, 2015	2015	TV series
EastSiders	Tony	2015	TV series
Transparent	MC Mama's Boi	2014	TV series
Looking	Taj	2014	TV series
Lit	Jesse	2014	Short
The Legend of My Heart Shaped Anus	Vera Myers	2008	Short
Lock Her Room	J.C.	2003	Short

Producer

Title	Year	Notes
Bruising for Besos	2016	associate producer, post production
Recession lemons	2010	Video documentary short (co-director)

Director

Title	Year	Notes
Recession lemons	2010	Video documentary short

Writer

Title	Year	Notes
Recession Lemons	2010	Video documentary short

Composer

Title	Year	Notes
Dada Ji	2005	Short

Editor

Title	Year	Notes
Recession Lemons	2010	Short

Self

Title	Year	Notes
This Is Me	2015	TV mini-series documentary
Performing Girl	2013	Documentary short
Recession Lemons	2010	D'Lo

== Touring shows ==
Title
D'FaQTo Life
D'FunQT
Ramble-Ations: A One D'Lo Show

== Awards ==
Title	Notes	Year
A One D'Lo Show (directed by Adeline Anthony)	NPN Creation Fund Grant	
Performing Girl (documentary by Crescent Diamond)	The best short documentary award	2013
