= Bleu Copas =

American Arabic translator

Bleu Copas is an American Arabic translator. In 2006, he was discharged from the United States Army under the Don't ask, don't tell policy for being gay. The discharge was seen as controversial not only for the policy but also for the timing when the Army had a pronounced need for Arab translators with the war on terrorism.

Born in 1976, Copas was raised in Tennessee in a conservative and religious environment. He reports admiring the ideal of military service as a child, and he enrolled in ROTC in college. After the September 11, 2001 attacks on the United States, Copas enlisted in the Army. After basic training at Fort Jackson, South Carolina, he attended the Defense Language Institute in California. There, he was trained in Arabic for future assignment as a combat translator.

Copas, who never admitted being gay while a soldier, was discharged honorably after an eight-month investigation. The investigation was triggered by a number of anonymous e-mails accusing Copas of homosexual acts; Copas's battalion commander with the 82nd Airborne at Fort Bragg determined that the evidence was sufficient to discharge Copas despite his denial. The Army claimed that the evidence indicated that Copas had engaged in at least two homosexual affairs while in the service, and that the e-mails had been sent in revenge for the failure of one of these relationships. Copas suggests that the information came from an anonymous informant whom he had met and mistakenly befriended in a chat room.

Copas has since returned to East Tennessee State University where he is studying for a master's degree in counseling.

== See also ==
- Sexual orientation and the United States military
