= Susana Cook =

Argentine writer

Susana Cook is an Argentinean-born, New York City-based experimental performance artist who has been writing and producing original work for over 20 years.

Cook began studying drama and performing in Argentina, before moving to New York City in 1993.

== Works ==
- The Fury of the Gods (2010)
- The unPatriotic Act: Homeland Insecurities (2007)
- The Idiot King (2006)
- The Values Horror Show (2005)
- 100 Years of Attitude (2004)
- Dykenstein: Sex, Horror and the Tragedy of the Straight Brain (2003)
- Hamletango: Prince of Butches (2002)
- Spic for Export (2002)
- The Fraud (2001)
- Gross National Product (2000)
- Conga Guerilla Forest (1999)
- Hot Tamale (1999)
- We are Faking our National Orgasm (1999)
- Bitches are a Girl’s Best Friend (1998)
- Parable of the Sour (1998)
- Rats: The Fantasy of Extermination (1998)
- Butch Fashion Show in the Femme Auto Body Shop (1997)
- Post Colonial Butches: Post Patriarchal Femmes and other Blessings (1997)
- Gender Acts (1996)
- Tango Lesbiango (1996)
- The Service Economy Vaudeville (1996)
- The Title: A Parody of Opera, Angels and Tango (1994)
- Las Tres Américas (1992)
