= Canadian ethnicity =

"Canadian" as an ethnic identity

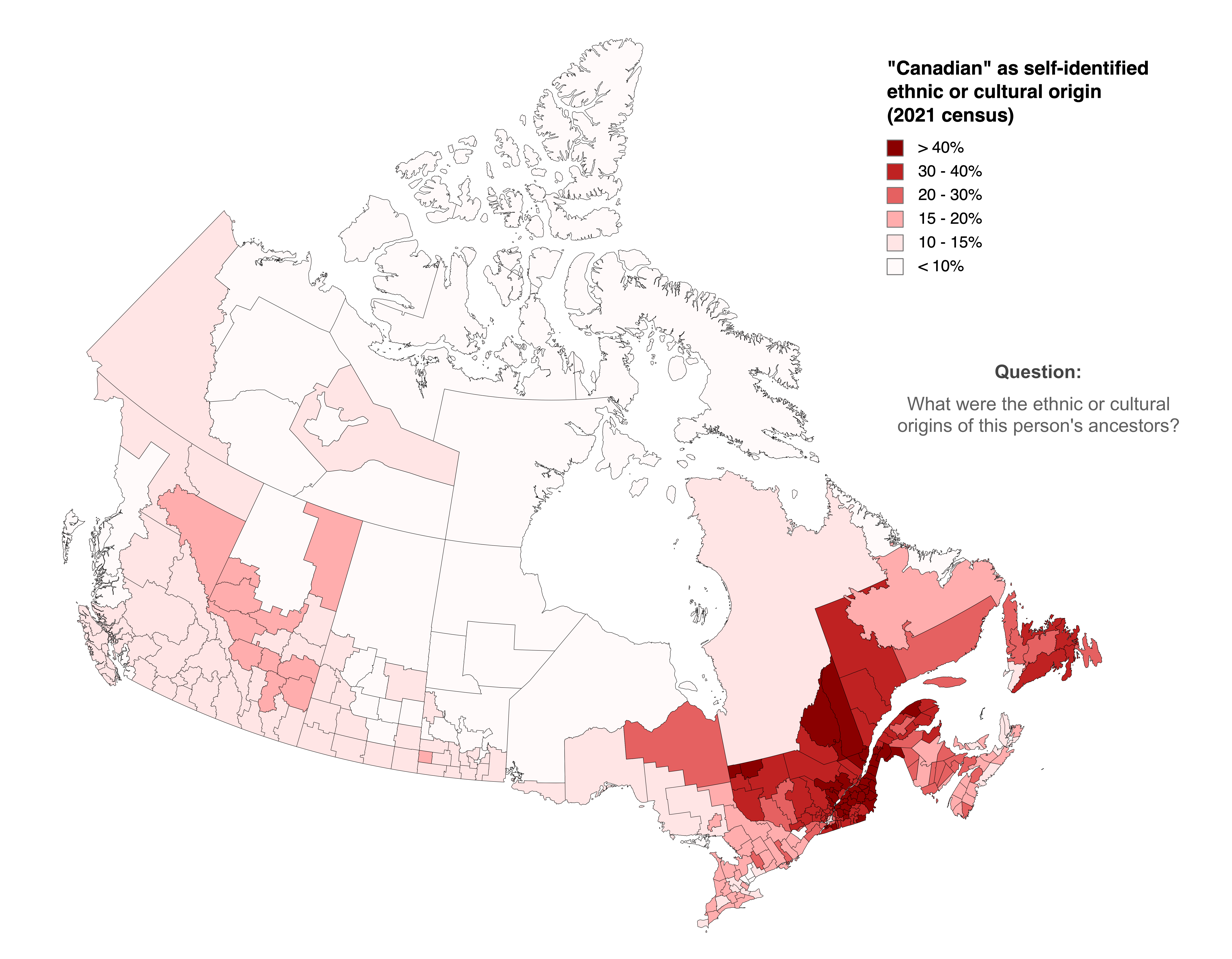
- Canadian ethnic identity in each census division in 2021

Total population
- 5,677,205; 15.6% of Canada's population (2021)

Regions with significant populations
- Quebec and Atlantic Canada

Languages
- English; French

Religion
- Predominantly Christianity (Catholicism and Protestantism)

Related ethnic groups
- French Canadians, English Canadians, Scottish Canadians, Irish Canadians

Canadian ethnicity refers to the self-identification of one's ethnic origin or ancestral roots as being Canadian. (Note: "Often referred to as a person's ancestral 'roots', ethnic or cultural origins should not be confused with citizenship, nationality, language or place of birth." In the 2021 census, the terms "origins" and "ancestry" are used interchangeably.) It was added as a possible response for an ethnic origin in the Canadian census in 1996. (Note: Ethnic origin, as defined in the Census, refers to the ethnic or cultural group(s) to which the respondent's ancestors belong. An ancestor is someone from whom a person is descended, and is usually more distant than a grandparent.) The identification is attributed primarily to White Canadians who do not identify with their ancestral ethnic origins due generational distance from European ancestors. The identification is more common in eastern parts of the country that were first settled by Europeans than in the rest of the country.

Canadians with ancestral roots in France and the British Isles are the most likely groups to identify or perceive their ethnic origin as Canadian. As their languages, traditions, and cultural practices largely define Canadian society, many do not see themselves as linked to any other nation or ethnic group. French-speaking Canadians with settler roots are more likely to perceive their ethnic origin as Canadian than as French. Most English-speaking Canadians whose families have lived in Canada for multiple generations identify with their European ethnic ancestry, and Canadian ethnic identity among them is significantly less common than among French Canadians.

Indigenous Canadians generally do not perceive their ethnic origin as Canadian, as Canadian identity originated with European settlers and does not reflect Indigenous nations which possess their own languages, cultures, and identities; Indigenous ethnic groups are the First Nations groups, Inuit, and Métis. Canadians with non-European or Indigenous origins (referred to as "visible minorities") (Note: "Visible minority" remains a legal term according to the Government of Canada, though Statistics Canada has generally replaced the term with "racialized people" or "racialized groups" since 2022. Indigenous peoples are excluded from both definitions.) may choose "Canadian" to express a Canadian "ethno-cultural ancestry". In 2001, 8% of all visible minorities (including those mixed with non-visible minority groups) reported a "Canadian" response. 5.9% of the Black Canadian population (91,850 people) reported the response in 2021 (2.5% as a single origin).

"Canadian" was the most common ethnic or cultural origin reported in the 2021 census, reported alone or in combination with other origins by 5.67 million people or 15.6% of the total population. This has decreased significantly from its historic peak of 39.4% in the 2001 Census.

== Definition ==
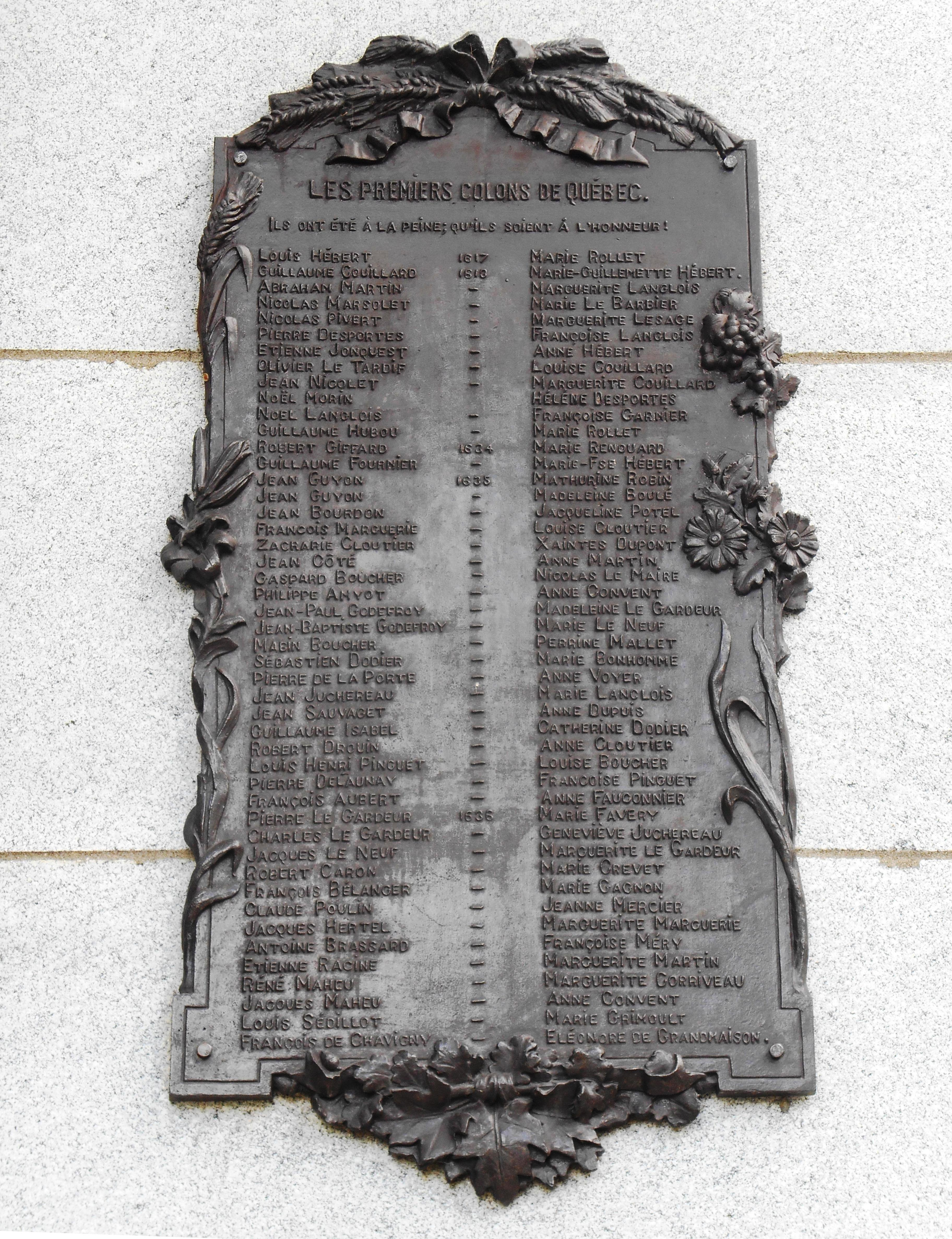
Several surnames of the first French settlers of Quebec City ceased to exist in France but became well-established in North America (mainly in Quebec), such as Gagnon, Cloutier, and Corriveau.

There exists a contrast in the understanding of ethnicity between English- and French-speaking Canadians. Social scientist Rhoda Howard-Hassmann has stated that among English-speaking Canadians, ethnic identity is frequently misunderstood as meaning biological ancestry, "so that everyone's true identity is presumed to be rooted somewhere else". French-speaking Canadians more frequently perceive their ethnic origin as rooted in cultural heritage rather than biological ancestry.

Canadian identity emerged separately in English and in French, and tends to have different undertones or meanings to speakers of these languages. Beginning in the 1600s, the identity Canadien was originally used exclusively by the French settlers of the French colony of Canada. After New France ceased to exist and settlement from France completely stopped, Canadian identity became adopted by British and English-speaking settlers, following the arrival of United Empire Loyalists to British North America. The English identity Canadian was considered equivalent to the French identity Canadien for the first known time in 1792. Descendants of the settlers of the French colony of Canada began using "French Canadian" and, since the Quiet Revolution of the 1960s, "Québécois" to distinguish themselves from other Canadians.

=== Modern usage ===
Many people with mixed racialized origins report a dual identity rather than one based on being a visible minority. Statistics Canada allows multiple ethnic origin responses on the census, meaning a small share of racialized or visible minority respondents identify "Canadian" alongside other ancestral roots. The common ingroup identity model suggests that some individuals who struggle to integrate various identities may affiliate themselves with a more inclusive and larger group. Some racialized individuals identify as "Canadian," a persona they believe is more inclusive for persons from a diverse variety of cultural backgrounds.

== Statistical data ==
The 1996 census was the first where Statistics Canada allowed "Canadian" as a valid ethnic origin response. It immediately became the most common origin reported and was correlated with a significant decline in English and French origin responses. People with Scottish or Irish origins were likely to list these origins along with "Canadian" and the number of responses for them did not significantly change. By 2001, English and French responses had each declined by more than 3 million from 1986.

Of the 5.67 million Canadian ethnic origin responses in the 2021 census, 4.18 million people reported it as a single origin and 1.49 million reported it in combination with other origins. According to Statistics Canada 2021 census data, roughly 5.9% of the Black population in Canada reported "Canadian" as an ethnic or cultural origin. This equals 91,850 total responses, with 38,810 reporting it as a single origin and 53,040 reporting it alongside multiple origins. Long-established or third-generation Black Canadians are more likely to report multiple roots—including European or Canadian origins.

Across all provinces, people living in non-metropolitan areas are significantly more likely to identify Canadian ethnicity than metropolitan residents.

Compared to other countries settled by Europeans, 5.3% of the U.S. population reported "American" ancestry in the 2022 American Community Survey and 29.9% of respondents reported "Australian" ancestry in the 2021 Australian census. (Note: The 2021 Australian census form included "Australian" as an example of an ancestral origin, making it comparable to Canada's 1996-2016 censuses and not the 2021 census.)

Canadian ethnic origin
Year	Total	Percent of population
1996	8,806,275	30.9%
2001	11,682,680	39.4%
2006	10,066,290	32.2%
2011	10,563,805	32.2%
2016	11,135,965	32.3%
2021	5,677,205	15.6%

The decline in Canadian ethnic origin responses in 2021 is largely due to changes in the format of the ethnic origin question in the census. Each census questionnaire between 1996 and 2016 included a list of examples of ethnic origins to enter, all with "Canadian" as the first example listed, except in 1996 when it was the fifth example. The 2021 census did not list any examples, negatively affecting a respondent's likelihood of entering "Canadian" as an origin. Additionally, prior to the 2021 census, a respondent answering "French Canadian" would be counted once for French and once for Canadian. New ethnic categories were created for the 2021 census, including "French Canadian" as a single ethnic origin, reported by 906,000 people. Because of these changes, Statistics Canada has stated that "2021 census data on ethnic or cultural origins are not comparable to data from previous censuses."

Between 2016 and 2021, there was a significant increase in other non-Indigenous North American origins. Responses for "Québécois" increased from 195,000 to 982,000 and "Acadian" from 192,000 to 305,000. Between these years, the number of people responding "Canadian" declined less significantly as a single origin (from 6.43 million to 4.18 million) than when including responses with other origins (from 11.13 million to 5.67 million).

For the 2006 census, Statistics Canada stated "ethnic origin responses in the census are a reflection of each respondent's perception of their ethnic ancestry". For the 2021 census, Statistics Canada stated "ethnic or cultural origins refers to the ethnic or cultural origins of the person's ancestors. Ancestors may have Indigenous origins, or origins that refer to different countries, or other origins that may not refer to different countries."

=== Geographic distribution ===
Canadian ethnic identity is most prevalent in Quebec and Atlantic Canada, which were the first parts of the country to be settled by Europeans. Identification is particularly high in Quebec among the majority French Canadian population, who trace their ancestry to settlers who arrived at the French colony of Canada from the Kingdom of France beginning in 1608 and ending with the Conquest of New France in 1760. Approximately 33,500 colonists arrived from France during this period, though only about 8,500 did not die early due to harsh winters or return to France and had at least one child in the colony. Through historically high birth rates, there are about seven million French Canadians today descended almost entirely from these original 8,500 settlers.

For the most part, Western Canada was populated by large numbers of Europeans starting in the early 1900s, considerably later than Quebec and the Atlantic provinces. Its later settlement has led to the comparatively lower number of people in Western provinces who consider their ancestral origin Canadian. The first Europeans to populate Western Canada were generally considered immigrants and not settlers, in contrast to the first Europeans to populate Eastern Canada.

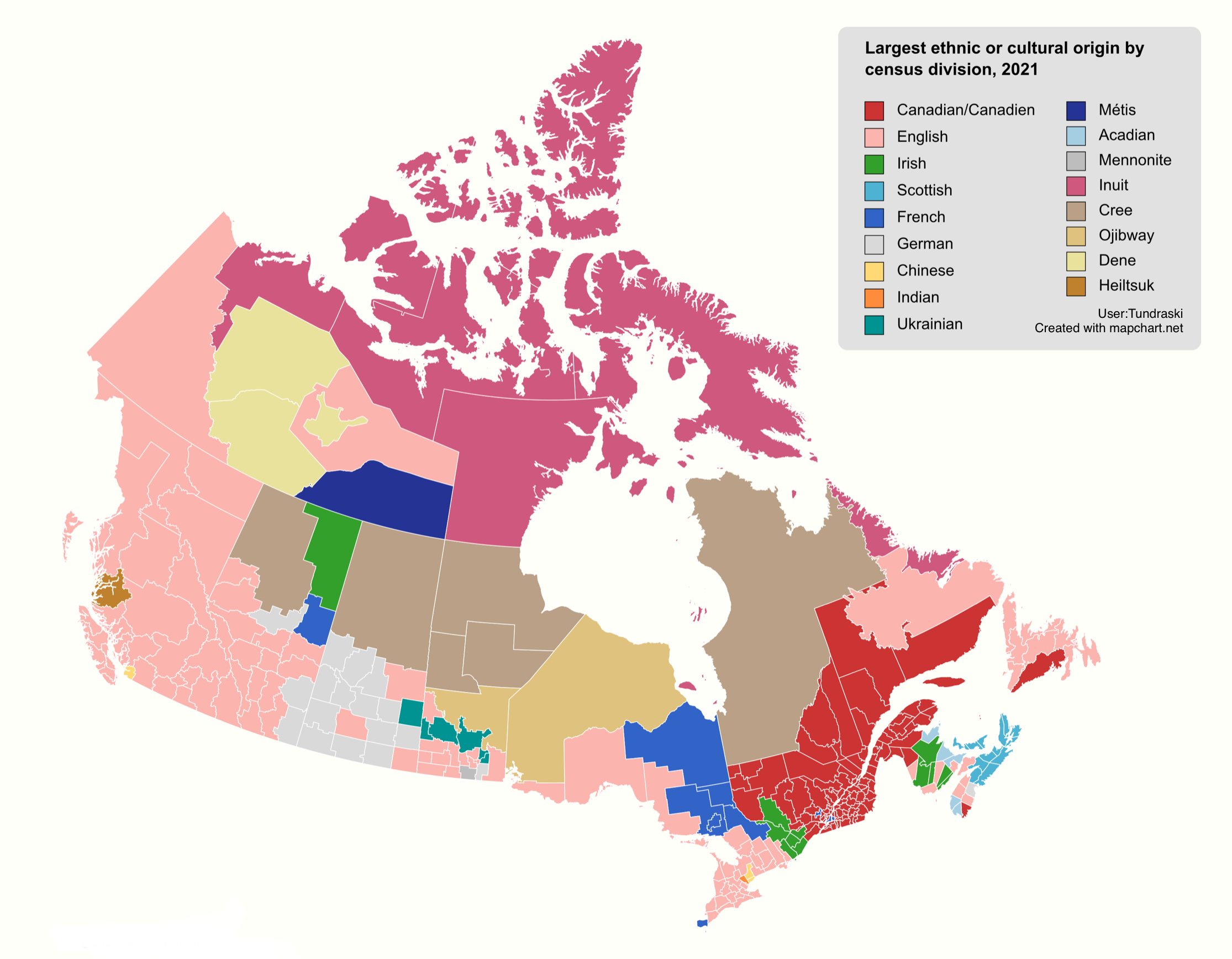
Largest ethnic or cultural origin by census division in 2021.

Provinces & territories
Province/territory	Percent	Total
Quebec	29.0%	2,412,040
Newfoundland and Labrador	24.9%	125,120
New Brunswick	23.0%	174,910
Nova Scotia	15.8%	151,300
Prince Edward Island	15.2%	22,825
Yukon	11.8%	4,680
Alberta	11.6%	484,655
Ontario	11.6%	1,621,655
Saskatchewan	9.7%	107,095
British Columbia	9.3%	459,320
Northwest Territories	8.4%	3,380
Manitoba	8.4%	109,195
Nunavut	2.8%	1,025
Canada	15.6%	5,677,205

=== Religion ===
Canadian ethnicity by religion
Religion	2001		2021	
Religion	Total	Percent	Total	Percent
Christianity	9,892,025	84.67%	3,356,160	59.12%
Catholic	6,648,200	56.91%	2,294,495	40.42%
Protestant	2,998,725	25.67%	646,445	11.39%
Other Christian	245,780	2.1%	415,220	7.31%
Irreligion	1,665,410	14.26%	2,169,870	38.22%
Other	125,245	1.07%	151,175	2.66%
Total	11,682,680	100%	5,677,205	100%

=== In other countries ===
In the New Zealand census, "Canadian" is an ethnicity in the "European" category. In 2023, it was reported by 8,910 respondents. It is listed at the end of the European category, along with "American", "Afrikaner", and other groups descended from Europeans, instead of alphabetically like the rest of the European groups.

In the United States census, "Canadian" and "French Canadian" are ancestral origins in the "Other White" category. In the 2020 American Community Survey, more than 640,000 people had Canadian ancestry and more than 1.9 million had French Canadian ancestry. The highest concentration of respondents for both ancestries is in New England.

== Addition to the census ==
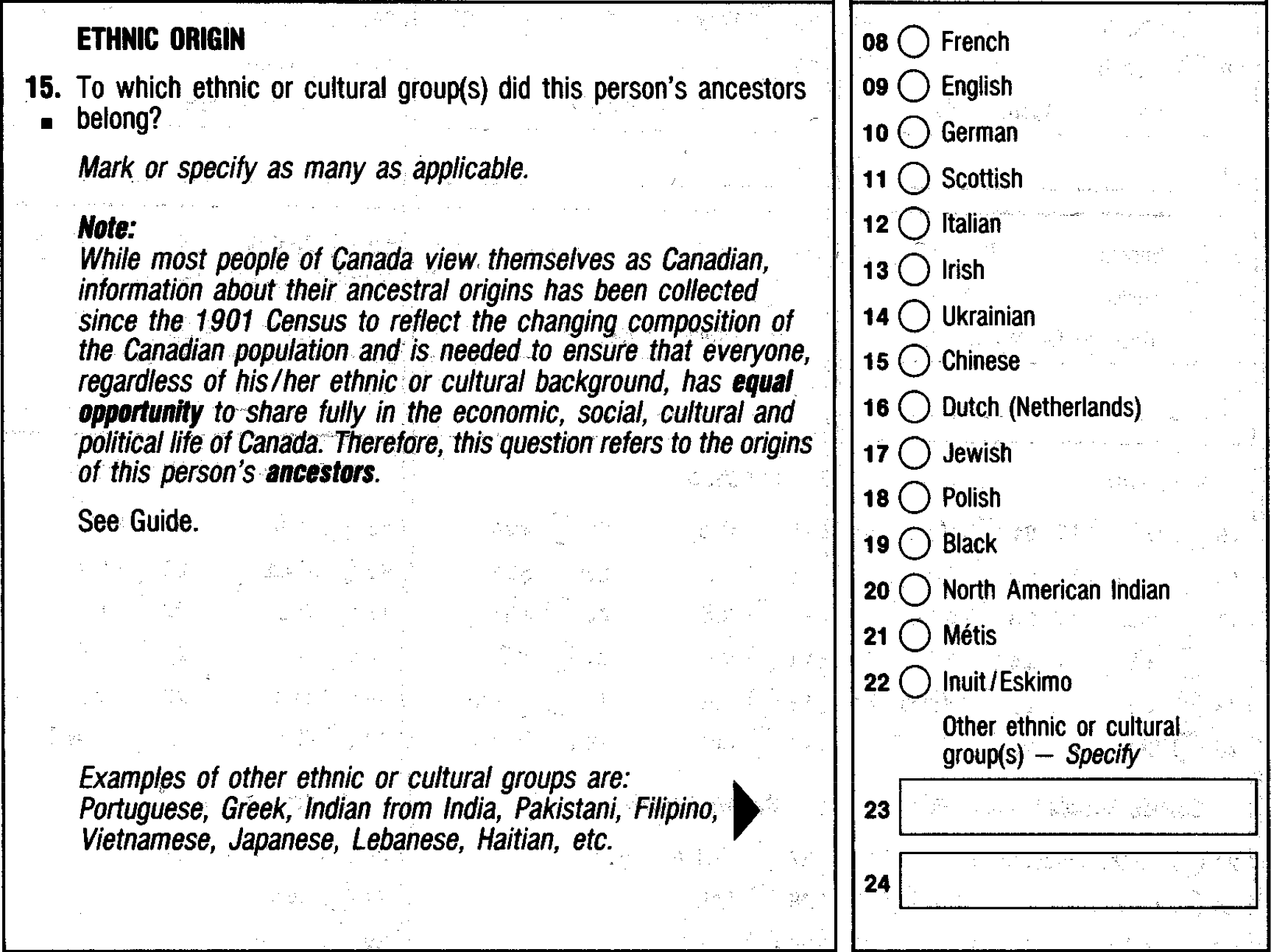
The 1991 census question on ethnic origin discouraged the entry of "Canadian".

Prior to 1996, "Canadian" as a response for an ethnic origin was explicitly discouraged in the census. Respondents were instructed to enter only Old World or Indigenous ethnic origins, and were allowed to record Canadian "only if the respondent insisted". In 1986, 112,830 people reported Canadian as their ethnic origin.

A campaign named "Count Me Canadian" was organized in 1990 with the Toronto Sun encouraging the entry of "Canadian" to the 1991 census ethnic origin question. The campaign was initiated by the belief that ethnic differences were the cause of the "national unity crisis" amid the rise of the Quebec sovereignty movement several years before the 1995 Quebec independence referendum. Over one million respondents (two-thirds from Ontario) entered "Canadian" as their ethnic origin, making it the fifth most common origin response. This led to changes to the following 1996 census ethnic origin question. It became open-ended, prompting respondents to write-in their answer rather than checking a box from a list, with "Canadian" listed fifth alongside other examples of responses.

Ethnic Origin Questions from 1971 to 2001
Census Year	1971	1981	1986	1991, 1996, 2001
Ethnic Origin Question	To what ethnic or cultural group did you or your ancestors (on the male side) belong on coming to this continent?	To which ethnic or cultural group did you or your ancestors belong on first coming to this continent?	To which ethnic or cultural group(s) do you or did your ancestors belong?	To which ethnic or cultural group(s) did this person's ancestors belong?

== See also ==
- Old Stock Canadians
- Name of Canada
- Zacharie Cloutier
