= André Corriveau =

André Corriveau may refer to:

- André Corriveau (filmmaker), Canadian filmmaker
- André Corriveau (ice hockey) (1928–1993), Canadian ice hockey player

== See also ==
- Corriveau (surname)
