= Pure laine =

French term for Québécois people of full French-Canadian ancestry

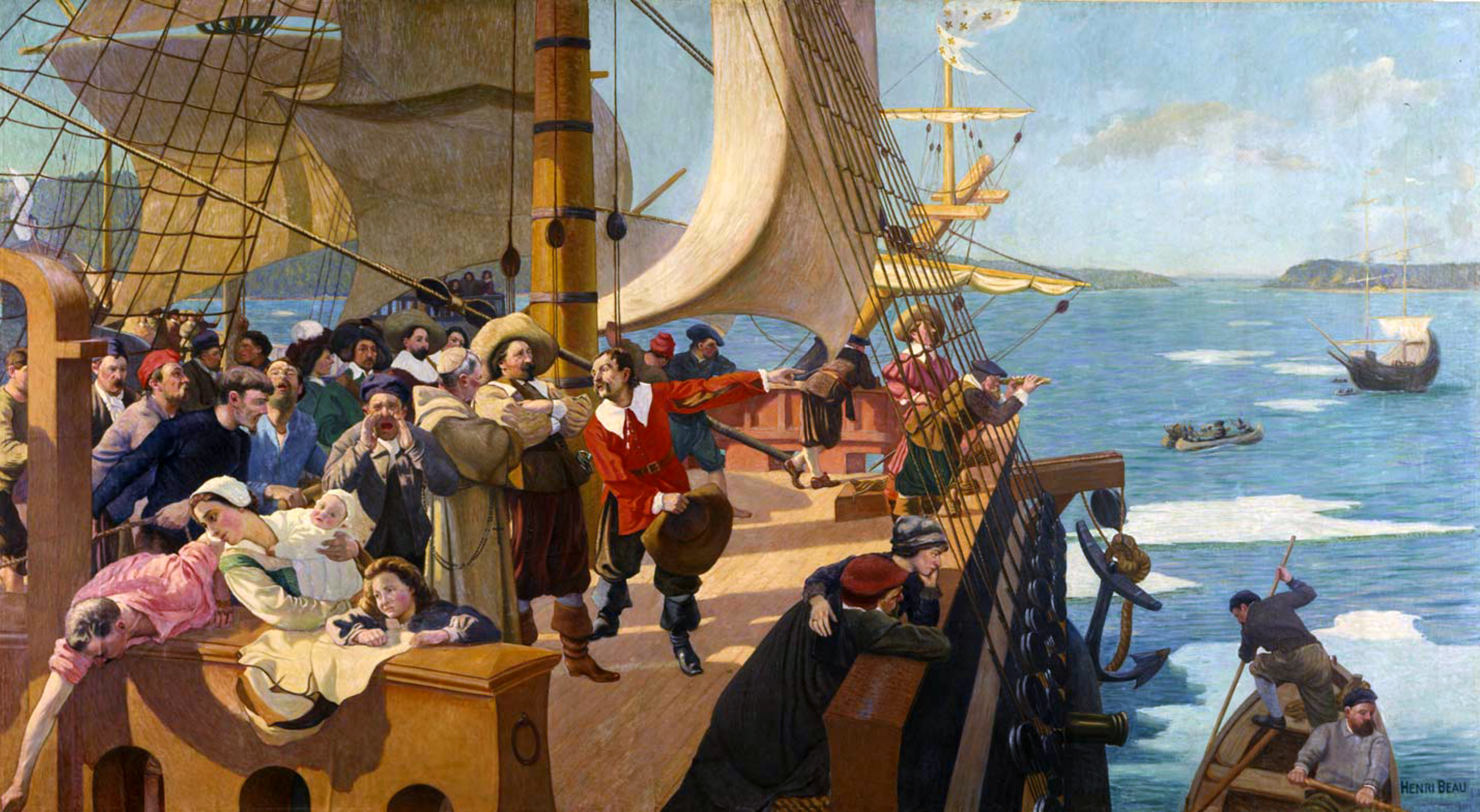
Samuel de Champlain was a French explorer who established the earliest French settlements in what is now Quebec.

The French term pure laine (lit. 'pure wool' or 'genuine', often translated as 'old stock' or 'dyed-in-the-wool') refers to Québécois people of full French Canadian ancestry, meaning those descended from the original settlers of New France who arrived during the 17th and 18th centuries. Terms with a similar meaning include de souche (of the base of the tree, or root) and old stock as in "Old Stock Canadians".

Many French-Canadians are able to trace their ancestry back to the original settlers from France—a number are descended from mixed marriages between the French, Scottish, and Irish settlers. Unions sharing Roman Catholic faith were approved by the Roman Catholic Church in Quebec. Many English emigrants in the region, especially after 1763 when Quebec was ceded to Britain, were ultimately assimilated into Francophone culture.

The term is associated with nativism and ethnic nationalism in Quebec, and its usage has been criticized for excluding immigrants from Québécois identity and culture.

== History ==
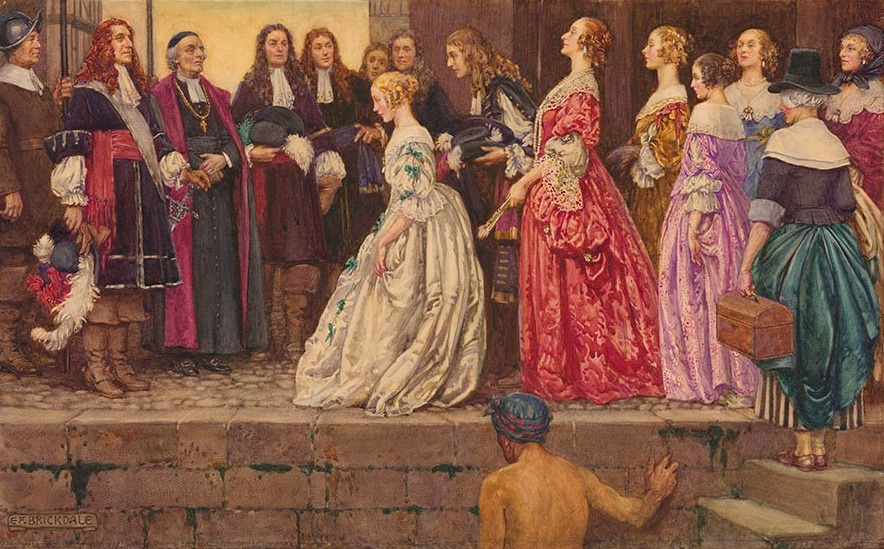
The King's Daughters (les filles du roi) were among the first French women to settle in New France, becoming the ancestors of many claiming pure laine ancestry.

The genealogy of the pure laine – dating back to original settlers of New France in the seventeenth century – has been the subject of detailed research. Prior to 1663 the Société Notre-Dame de Montréal recruited women to come to Montreal, then known as Ville-Marie. King Louis XIV – following the advice of Jean Talon, Intendant of New France – sponsored about 800 female immigrants the King's Daughters or les filles du Roi to increase the number of marriages and therefore the population of New France. The Sisters of Notre-Dame facilitated their settling in Ville-Marie. In his 1992 PhD dissertation Yves Landry listed 770 of the approximately 800 by name.

From the seventeenth century into the twentieth century, French Canadians lived in relative geographic and linguistic isolation. Their "settlements, internal migrations, and natural population increase" were well-documented with "3 million records covering the whole province of Quebec over four centuries." By 2015 "extended pedigrees of up to 17 generations" were constructed from "a sample of present-day individuals." In an article published in 2001 in the Annual Review of Genomics and Human Genetics, McGill University professor Charles R. Scriver, observed there is "important evidence of social transmission of demographic behavior [sic] that contributed to effective family size and population structure." Founder populations, like the descendants of the early French immigrants, have an important role in the study of genetic diseases. With an unusually high prevalence of genetic disorders in the subpopulations of Quebec, they became the subject of human genetics research. Clusters of hereditary disorders in eastern Quebec in the twentieth century were traced to immigrants from Perche, France who arrived in the seventeenth century.

Catholic priest and historian Lionel Groulx (1878–1967) was the key figure behind the rise of Quebec nationalism which stressed "territoriality and the use of the Quebec state" in the first half of the twentieth century. Jean Éthier-Blais claimed that among Quebec nationalist intellectuals the twentieth century was Groulx century — "le siècle de l'abbé Groulx." Groulx's best-known novel L'Appel de la race, challenged the narrative surrounding French-English relationships in Quebec and revisited the history of Canada from a French Canadian perspective. In the 1920s following the publication of this novel, French Canadian nationalism "espoused the thought of Lionel Groulx", retained Catholicism and abandoned Henri Bourassa's pan-Canadian perspective. In 1998, Xavier Gélinas, then-Curator at the Canadian Museum of History (French: Musée canadien de l’histoire), then known as the Canadian Museum of Civilization, presented a talk at a conference on Quebec history in which he argued that even in the 1980s Groulxism remained as an important ideology among Quebecois. Groulx's work is considered to be a contributing factor to the Quiet Revolution in 1960 even though the Quebec nationalism of the révolution tranquille was "a-religious and ethnically pluralistic." Expressions such as Canadiens français pure laine, Québécois pure laine or révolution tranquille became powerful evocative symbols charged with ideology and identity. Gélinas challenged the thesis of French Canadian historian Esther Delisle whom he described as pure laine. Delisle's controversial PhD political science dissertation and the book entitled The Traitor and the Jew based on her thesis, argued that Groulx and the newspaper Le Devoir were antisemitic and supported fascism.

== Controversy and debate ==
The use of pure laine was brought to the forefront following its controversial usage in the front-page article by Jan Wong in Canada's nationally distributed newspaper, The Globe and Mail on September 16, 2006, three days after the shooting at Dawson College in Montreal. In her article entitled "Get under the desk," Wong argued that the frequent and historic use of the term pure laine revealed a uniquely Québécois brand of racism. "Elsewhere, to talk of racial 'purity' is repugnant. Not in Quebec." Furthermore, she suggested that the school shootings might have been related to the fact that the perpetrators were not old-stock French Québécois and they had been alienated by a Quebec society concerned with "racial purity."

Wong's accusations were denounced by National Post journalist, Barbara Kay, then-Premier Jean Charest and the Société Saint-Jean-Baptiste (SSJB). SSJB President Jean Dorion declared "There is no obsession for racial purity in Quebec, definitely not. The expression 'pure laine' is absolutely obsolete."

However the term was still frequently used in both English and French media. And in 2007, the Bouchard-Taylor Commission included the recommendation that the use of the expression "Québécois de souche" be ended and replaced with the term "Quebecers of French-Canadian origin." The Commission investigated reasonable accommodation of immigrants into Quebec society.

According to David Austin, author of Fear of a Black Nation (2013), which was based on Austin's two decades of inquiry including interviews and international archival research,

Québecois has conventionally been used to signify the descendants of Québec settlers from France, the majority habitants of the province, who are otherwise referred to as pure laine (pure wool) or Québécois de souche (of the base of the tree, or root). However, the changing face of Québec's increasingly diverse population challenges the privileged place of those French descendants and calls for a more inclusive notion of what it means to be Québécois or a Quebecer.

== Similar terms in English ==
=== Old-stock Canadians ===
The English-Canadian equivalent to pure laine is "old stock", referring to the descendants of those original settlers of British Canada and French Canada who immigrated in the 17th and 18th centuries. Liberal MP Stéphane Dion used the term in 2014: "If I'm fishing with a friend on a magnificent lake in the Laurentians ... and I see a small boat in the distance ... usually it's two middle-aged old-stock French-Canadians or English-Canadians."

== See also ==
- Québécois people
- Canadian ethnicity
- Pur et dur
