= Cloutier =

Cloutier may refer to:

- Cloutier (surname)
- 253587 Cloutier, an asteroid
- Cloutier, Quebec, an area in the city of Rouyn-Noranda, Canada
- Cloutier River, a river in Quebec, Canada
- Saint-Alphonse/Lac Cloutier Water Aerodrome, an airport in Quebec, Canada

== See also ==
- Cloutierville, Louisiana, an unincorporated community in the United States
- Cloture, a type of parliamentary motion
