= Old Stock Canadians =

European Canadians whose family has lived in Canada prior to the Canadian Confederation

- One version of the Canadian Red Ensign. The banners on the shield represent the ancestries usually associated with 'Old Stock Canadians' (English, Scottish, Irish, French).

Regions with significant populations
- Canada and the United States

Languages
- Acadian French; Canadian English; Canadian French; Canadian Gaelic; Newfoundland Irish

Religion
- Christianity: Roman Catholicism; Protestantism (mostly Anglican, Presbyterian, and United)

Related ethnic groups
- Old Stock Americans, English, French, Québécois, Acadians, Irish, Scots, First Nations, Métis, Inuit, White Anglo-Saxon Protestants

Old Stock Canadians is a term referring to Western European Canadians whose families have lived in Canada for many generations (prior to Confederation). It is used by some to refer exclusively to English-speaking Canadians with British Isles settler ancestors, (Note: Often tied to the United Empire Loyalist identity. They were central to the Initial settlement of what would become Upper Canada (and later Ontario) which was also foundational for the development of English Canada.) but it usually refers to British Canadians, Irish and French Canadians as parallel old stock groups. Ethnic French Canadians, who descend from French settlers in New France (prior to the Conquest of New France in 1760), are sometimes referred to as pure laine, often translated as "dyed in the wool", but with the same connotation as old stock.

== Colonial history of Canada ==
Old stock Canadians arrived as the original settlers of French Canada and British Canada. In 1871 (right after Confederation), approximately 3.4 million Canadians were of Western European descent (98.4% of the total population) of which roughly 83.9% were Canadian-born.

== Definition and use ==
Elaine Elke defines old stock Canadians as, "white, Christian and English speaking."

Richard Bourhis, however, regards both Anglophone and Francophone Canadians as old stock, reporting that large number of both groups self-describe their ethnicity as "Canadian," although he states that many Canadians associate the term with Anglophone identity. Boyd and Norris concur in finding that Canadians primarily associate the term with Anglophone identity.

While the term can refer to Canadians who are descendants of settlers or immigrants who have lived in the country for one or more generations as then PM Stephen Harper said in 2015, it is most typically applied to those whose families were originally from France or Britain. For example, Liberal MP Stéphane Dion used the term in 2014 in the following manner:

"If I'm fishing with a friend on a magnificent lake in the Laurentians ... and I see a small boat in the distance ... usually it's two middle-aged old-stock French-Canadians or English-Canadians."

Some would also refer to this term as those whose families arrived in Canada prior to post-WWII waves of immigration.

Individuals of Francophone descent who self-describe as "old stock" include journalist Lysiane Gagnon, "I am an old-stock Canadian whose ancestor, Mathurin Gagnon, came to Canada in 1640 from a small farming community in the western part of Normandy." She describes "old stock" as "those who came from France in the early 17th century and a much smaller group who came from Great Britain in the wake of the 1759 British Conquest." She explains that, "There's never been, in my family, stories or recollections of another kind of life on another continent or memories of an exodus. My forebears never knew another country than Canada. They never had another native language than French. They never cooked meals that were different from their neighbour's. They never had a wide network of cousins in faraway places. As a child, the most 'different' persons I had in my family circle were a Scottish aunt and a few Irish cousins. Coming from an old-stock background (which is the case of 80 per cent of Quebeckers) shapes your personality and influences your views – not always for the best..."

According to Gagnon, "Old-stock francophones used to call themselves "French-Canadians" (with a hyphen)," but the term has passed out of fashion. Journalist Tu Thanh Ha concurs. Now they will call themselves Quebecois, as they consider themselves as a distinguished ethnic group of Canada.

According to sociolinguist Charles Boberg, while most Canadians reporting their ethnicity in the 2000 census as "Canadian" were "old stock" descendants of French or British immigrant ancestors, descendants of 20th century Welsh, American, Swedish, Norwegian, Danish, Irish or Scots ancestors were more likely to consider themselves as Canadian, than those of Chinese, Filipino, East Indian, Portuguese, Greek, Vietnamese, or Jamaican descent, indicating that northern Europeans assimilated with old stock Canadians more readily than other groups.

Some writers describe the effort to construct a Canadian identity encompassing First Nations peoples, old stock Francophones and Anglophones, and recent immigrants and their Canada-born descendants.

During discussions about Quebec's demands to be labelled a "distinct society", then Prime Minister Pierre Trudeau said that the Province's attempt was a racist concept that would make "second- or third- class citizens of everyone but 'old stock' Quebecers."

== Justin Trudeau controversy ==
In 2007, Justin Trudeau, later Prime Minister but then a candidate for the Liberal Party of Canada, raised the ire of some commentators for using "old stock Canadian" during an interview, dismissing Quebec's claim of being a "nation". He asked: "...whether everyone in Quebec was part of that nation, or just the “old stock” pioneers." In a later speech to the University Club about the distinctiveness of Quebec, he clarified: "In the sociological sense of the term we can talk about the nation of Quebec or Quebec as a nation."

== Harper controversy ==
In the 2015 federal election campaign in Canada, which was taking place against the backdrop of hundreds of thousands of refugees of the Syrian Civil War (2011–2020) fleeing to Europe, then Prime Minister Stephen Harper's use of the appellation 'Old Stock Canadians' created a media frenzy.

Harper explained (in reference to a debate on health care policy): "I know that that is a position supported widely through the Canadian population, it's supported by Canadians who are themselves immigrants and also supported by the rest of us, by Canadians who have been the descendants of immigrants for one or more generations."

Social researcher Frank Graves, founder and current president of EKOS Research Associates Inc., described the use of the term 'old-stock Canadians' as a deliberate strategy called dog-whistle politics, a term that originated in Australian politics in the mid-1990s, which was used by John Howard in his successful political campaign under the direction of Lynton Crosby. Crosby was retained by Harper in September 2015. Graves claimed that this was a "deliberate strategy "to energize the Conservative base' and to sort them from the rest of the electorate. It creates a sense of us versus others." The 'dog-whistle' message analogy refers to the way in which a political message, which may in effect be exclusionary, distasteful and even racist, reactionary or inflammatory to some, is not understood as such by those outside the target subgroup of the electorate. The message resonates and energizes this target group and is misheard or misunderstood by others, just as the high pitched sound of the dog whistle is not heard except by dogs.

Tu Thanh Ha linked the phrase not only to "Québécois de souche" but also to Prime Minister Harper's recent hiring of Lynton Crosby, who is known to win elections "against great odds" in Australia (where he masterminded the successful General Election victories for the former Australian prime minister John Howard, in 1998 and 2001) and Britain by using "emotionally-charged campaigning tactics". In Canada, divisive polarizing issues include the banning of the niqāb from citizenship ceremonies and "raising fears about terrorism." Tu Thanh Ha claims that Harper was trying to pitch to minority voters "by drawing a line between the law-abiding ones, whose social values also happened to be conservative, and the others, those who were portrayed as queue-jumping terrorist-sympathizing bogus asylum seekers."

In an interview with the Toronto Star George Elliott Clarke, a Canadian poet and playwright and a 7th-generation descendant of black refugees of the War of 1812, said,

"The true 'old-stock' Canadians are the First Nations and Inuit and Metis, followed by the many divergent ethnicities who were also present in colonial Canada, from African slaves in muddy York to 'German' settlers on the South Shore of Nova Scotia, from the Chinese merchants present in Nouvelle-France to the Portuguese and Basque fishermen of Newfoundland...Personally, I think the current Prime Minister is unsure about his own identity and possibly nervous about the true, multicultural, multilingual, multiple-faiths and multiracial Canada that now beautifully, proudly, lives and flourishes."

— George Elliott Clarke

== See also ==
- Old Stock Australians
- Old Stock Americans
- Canadian ethnicity
- Cornish Canadians
- Pure laine
- Welsh Canadians
