= Cloutier (surname) =

Cloutier is a French occupational name for a nailer, from an agent derivative of clou (Latin clavus) for "nail". Most people with the surname Cloutier are descendants of Zacharie Cloutier, a pioneer who settled in New France from Perche, France in 1634 and founded one of the foremost families of Quebec. Notable people with the name include:

- Albert Edward Cloutier (1902–1965), Canadian painter
- Alexandre Cloutier (born 1977), Canadian politician
- Armand Cloutier (1901–1982), Canadian politician
- Braeden Cloutier (born 1974), American soccer coach and player
- Carl-Antoni Cloutier (born 1996), Canadian professional gamer better known as CarlJr.
- Catherine Cloutier (born 1950), American politician
- Cécile Cloutier (1930–2017), Canadian writer and educator
- Claude Cloutier (born 1957), Canadian film animator and graphic novel artist
- Dan Cloutier (born 1976), Canadian ice hockey player
- Dave Cloutier (1938–2017), American football player
- Émile Proulx-Cloutier (born 1983), Canadian actor and musician
- Fabien Cloutier (born 1975), Canadian actor and playwright
- François-Xavier Cloutier (1848–1934), Canadian cleric and Bishop of Trois Rivières
- Frederic Cloutier (born 1981), Italian ice hockey player
- Gary Cloutier (born 1962), American politician
- George Cloutier (1876–1946), Canadian lacrosse player
- Gilles Cloutier (1928–2014), Canadian scientist
- Guy Cloutier (born 1940), Canadian music producer and convicted sex offender
- Guylaine Cloutier (born 1969), Canadian international swimmer
- Jacques Cloutier (born 1960), Canadian ice hockey player
- James Cloutier (born c. 1938), American cartoonist
- Jean Cloutier (born c. 1959), Canadian politician
- Jean-Paul Cloutier (1924–2010), Canadian politician
- John Cloutier (born 1957), American politician
- Julie Cloutier (born 1986), Canadian fencer
- Kim Cloutier (born 1987), Canadian model
- Kristen Cloutier, American politician
- Loïc Cloutier (born 2004), Canadian soccer player
- Milaine Cloutier (born 1972), Canadian badminton player
- Nathalie Cloutier, Canadian film producer
- Patrick Cloutier (born 1970), Canadian soldier who became famous during the 1990 Oka Crisis
- Philip D. Cloutier (1949–1998), American politician
- Réal Cloutier (born 1956), Canadian ice hockey player
- Réjean Cloutier (born 1960), Canadian ice hockey player
- Roger Cloutier (born 1965), American military general
- Roland Cloutier (born 1957), Canadian ice hockey player
- Sheila Watt-Cloutier (born 1953), Canadian Inuit activist
- Suzanne Cloutier (1927–2003), Canadian film actress
- Suzanne Cloutier (gymnast) (born 1947), Canadian gymnast
- Sylvain Cloutier (born 1974), Canadian ice hockey player
- Sylvie Cloutier, Canadian geneticist and academic
- T. J. Cloutier (born 1939), American professional poker player
- Véronique Cloutier (born 1974), Canadian TV and radio personality
- William Cloutier, Canadian singer
- Zacharie Cloutier (c. 1590–1677), French carpenter and one of the founders of Beauport, Quebec
