= English Canadians =

Canadians of English birth or descent

Canadiens anglais
- English Canadians as per cent of population by census division.

Total population
- 6,263,880 (by ancestry) (Note: "English": 5,322,825 "British Isles, n.o.s.": 938,950 "British Isles origins, n.i.e.": 2,105) (Note: 1971-present: Statistic also includes all "Other British Origins" responses. Additionally, 1996-present census populations are undercounts, due to the creation of the "Canadian" ethnic origin. All citizens of Canada are classified as "Canadians" as defined by Canada's nationality laws. However, "Canadian" as an ethnic group has since 1996 been added to census questionnaires for possible ancestry. "Canadian" was included as an example on the English questionnaire and "Canadien" as an example on the French questionnaire. "The majority of respondents to this selection are from the eastern part of the country that was first settled. Respondents generally are visibly European (Anglophones and Francophones), however no-longer self identify with their ethnic ancestral origins. This response is attributed to a multitude or generational distance from ancestral lineage.); 17.2% of the total Canadian population (2021) c. 31.63 million (English-speaking Canadians); 87.1% of the total Canadian population (2021)

Regions with significant populations
- Throughout Canada, minority in Quebec

Languages
- English, Canadian English, Canadian French

Religion
- Christianity (Primarily Protestantism and Roman Catholicism)

Related ethnic groups
- English Americans and other English diaspora, Scottish Canadians and other British Canadians, Old Stock Canadians

English Canadians or Anglo-Canadians refers either to Canadians of English ethnic origin and heritage or to English-speaking (Anglophone) Canadians of any ethnic origin; it is used primarily in contrast with French Canadians. Canada is an officially bilingual country, with English and French official language communities. Immigrant cultural groups ostensibly integrate into one or both of these communities, but often retain elements of their original cultures. The term English-speaking Canadian is sometimes used interchangeably with English Canadian.

In addition to the terms "English Canadian" and "Canadian", the terms "Anglophone Canadian" and "Anglo-Canadian" are also used. An additional 11,135,965 Canadians describe their ethnic background as "Canadian", many of whom may also be of English ancestry.

== History ==
Ethnic English Canadian Population History
Year	Pop.	±%
1871	706,369	—
1881	881,301	+24.8%
1901	1,260,899	+43.1%
1911	1,871,268	+48.4%
1921	2,545,358	+36.0%
1931	2,741,419	+7.7%
1941	2,968,402	+8.3%
1951	3,630,344	+22.3%
1961	4,195,175	+15.6%
1971	6,247,585	+48.9%
1981	7,060,470	+13.0%
1986	9,311,910	+31.9%
1991	8,624,900	−7.4%
1996	6,982,320	−19.0%
2001	6,129,460 (Note: "English": 5,978,875 "British, n.i.e.": 150,585)	−12.2%
2006	6,973,930 (Note: "English": 6,570,015 "British Isles, n.i.e.": 403,915)	+13.8%
2011	7,085,530 (Note: "English": 6,509,500 "British Isles origins, n.i.e.": 576,030)	+1.6%
2016	6,964,780 (Note: "English": 6,320,085 "British Isles origins, n.i.e.": 644,695)	−1.7%
2021	6,263,880	−10.1%
Source: Statistics Canada Note1: 1981 Canadian census did not include multiple ethnic origin responses, thus population is an undercount. Note2: 1996-present census populations are undercounts, due to the creation of the "Canadian" ethnic origin category.

=== Newfoundland (and Labrador) ===
English Canadian history starts with the attempts to establish English settlements in Newfoundland in the sixteenth century. The first English settlement in present-day Canada was at St. Johns Newfoundland, in 1583. Newfoundland's population was significantly influenced by Irish and English immigration, much of it as a result of the migratory fishery in the decades prior to the Great Famine of Ireland. Although the location of the earliest English settlement in what would eventually become Canada, Newfoundland itself (now called Newfoundland and Labrador) was the last province to enter Confederation in 1949.

=== Nova Scotia ===
The area that forms the present day province of Nova Scotia was contested by the British and French in the eighteenth century. French settlements at Port Royal (Annapolis Royal), Louisbourg and what is now Prince Edward Island were seized by the British. After the 1713 Treaty of Utrecht ceded the French colony of Acadia (today's mainland Nova Scotia and New Brunswick) to Great Britain, efforts to colonize the province were limited to small settlements in Canso and Annapolis Royal. In 1749, Colonel Edward Cornwallis was given command of an expedition for the settlement of Chebucto by some three thousand persons, many of whom were Cockney. Cornwallis' settlement, Halifax, would become the provincial capital, the primary commercial centre for the Maritime provinces, a strategic British military and naval outpost and an important east coast cultural centre. To offset the Catholic presence of Acadians, foreign Protestants (mainly German) were given land and founded Lunenburg. Nova Scotia itself saw considerable immigration from Scotland, particularly to communities such as Pictou in the northern part of the province and to Cape Breton Island, but this began only with the arrival of the Hector in 1773.

=== Loyalists: New Brunswick, Quebec and Ontario ===
The history of English Canadians is bound to the history of English settlement of North America, and particularly New England, because of the resettlement of many Loyalists following the American Revolution in areas that would form part of Canada. Many of the fifty thousand Loyalists who were resettled to the north of the United States after 1783 came from families that had already been settled for several generations in North America and were from prominent families in Boston, New York and other east coast towns. Although largely of British ancestry, these settlers had also intermarried with Huguenot and Dutch colonists and were accompanied by Loyalists of African descent. Dispossessed of their property at the end of the Revolutionary War, the Loyalists arrived as refugees to settle primarily along the shores of southern Nova Scotia, the Bay of Fundy and the Saint John River and in Quebec to the east and southwest of Montreal.

The colony of New Brunswick was created from western part of Nova Scotia at the instigation of these new English-speaking settlers. The Loyalist settlements in southwestern Quebec formed the nucleus of what would become the province of Upper Canada and, after 1867, Ontario.

=== Ontario ===
Upper Canada was a primary destination for English, Scottish and Scots-Irish settlers to Canada in the nineteenth century, and was on the front lines in the War of 1812 between the British Empire and the United States. The province also received immigrants from non English-speaking sources such as Germans, many of whom settled around Kitchener (formerly called Berlin). Ontario became the most populous province in the Dominion of Canada at the time of Confederation, and, together with Montreal, formed the country's industrial heartland and emerged as an important cultural and media centre for English Canada. Toronto is today the largest city in Canada, and, largely as a result of changing immigration patterns since the 1960s, is also one of the most multi-cultural cities in the world.

=== Quebec ===
After the fall of New France to the British in 1759, a colonial governing class established itself in Quebec City. Larger numbers of English-speaking settlers arrived in the Eastern Townships and Montreal after the American Revolution. English, Scottish, and Irish communities established themselves in Montreal in the 1800s. Montreal became Canada's largest city and commercial hub in Canada. An Anglo-Scot business elite controlled Canadian commerce until the 1950s, founding a Protestant public school system and hospitals and universities such as McGill University. These immigrants were joined by other Europeans in the early 1900s, including Italians and Jews, who assimilated to a large degree into the anglophone community. Many English-speaking Quebeckers left Quebec following the election of the Parti Québécois in 1976 resulting in a steep decline in the anglophone population; many who have remained have learned French in order to function within the dominant Francophone society.

=== British Columbia ===
As in much of western Canada, many of the earliest European communities in British Columbia began as outposts of the Hudson's Bay Company, founded in London in 1670 to carry on the fur trade via Hudson Bay. Broader settlement began in earnest with the founding of Fort Victoria in 1843 and the subsequent creation of the Colony of Vancouver Island in 1849. The capital, Victoria developed during the height of the British Empire and long self-identified as being "more English than the English".

The Colony of British Columbia was established on the mainland in 1858 by Governor James Douglas as a means of asserting British sovereignty in the face of a massive influx of gold miners, many of whom were American. Despite the enormous distances that separated the Pacific colony from Central Canada, British Columbia joined Confederation in 1871, choosing to become Canadian partly as a means of resisting possible absorption into the United States. Chinese workers, brought in to labour on the construction of the Canadian Pacific Railway, established sizeable populations in many B.C. communities, particularly Vancouver which quickly became the province's economic and cultural centre after the railway's completion in 1886. Like Ontario, British Columbia has received immigrants from a broad range of countries including large numbers of Germans, Scandinavians, Italians, Sikhs from India and Chinese from Hong Kong, Taiwan and in more recent years, the People's Republic, and the ongoing influx of Europeans from Europe continues. However, for many years British Columbia, in contrast to the Prairie Provinces, received a majority of immigrants from Great Britain: over half in 1911 and over 60 per cent by 1921. Over half of people with British ancestry in British Columbia have direct family ties within two generations (i.e. grandparent or parent) to the British Isles, rather than via British ethnic stock from Central Canada or the Maritimes (unlike the Prairies where Canadian-British stock is more common). Europeans of non-British stock have been more common, also, in British Columbia than in any other part of Canada, although certain ethnicities such as Ukrainians and Scandinavians are more concentrated in the Prairies. Except for the Italians and more recent European immigrants, earlier waves of Europeans of all origins are near-entirely assimilated, although any number of accents are common in families and communities nearly anywhere in the province, as has also been the case since colonial times. Interethnic and interracial marriages and were also more common in British Columbia than in other provinces since colonial times.

=== Alberta, Manitoba and Saskatchewan ===
The French-English tensions that marked the establishment of the earliest English-speaking settlements in Nova Scotia were echoed on the Prairies in the late nineteenth century. The earliest British settlement in Assiniboia (part of present-day Manitoba) involved some 300 largely Scottish colonists under the sponsorship of Thomas Douglas, Lord Selkirk in 1811. The suppression of the rebellions allowed the government of Canada to proceed with a settlement of Manitoba, Saskatchewan and Alberta that was to create provinces that identified generally with English Canada in culture and outlook, although immigration included large numbers of people from non English-speaking European backgrounds, especially Scandinavians and Ukrainians.

=== Twentieth century ===
Although Canada has long prided itself on its relatively peaceful history, war has played a significant role in the formation of an English Canadian identity. As part of the British Empire, Canada found itself at war against the Central Powers in 1914. In the main, English Canadians enlisted for service with an initial enthusiastic and genuine sense of loyalty and duty. The sacrifices and accomplishments of Canadians at battles such as Vimy Ridge and the Dieppe Raid in France are well known and respected among English Canadians and helped forge a more common sense of nationality. In World War II, Canada made its own separate declaration of war and played a critical role in supporting the Allied war effort. Again, support for the war effort to defend the United Kingdom and liberate continental Europe from Axis domination was particularly strong among English Canadians. In the post war era, although Canada was committed to the North Atlantic Treaty Organization, English Canadians took considerable pride in the Nobel Peace Prize awarded to Lester Pearson for his role in resolving the Suez Crisis and have been determined supporters of the peacekeeping activities of the United Nations.

In the late twentieth century, increasing American cultural influence combined with diminishing British influence, and political and constitutional crises driven by the exigencies of dealing with the Quebec sovereignty movement and Western alienation contributed to something of an identity crisis for English Canadians. George Grant's Lament for a Nation is still seen as an important work relating to the stresses and vulnerabilities affecting English Canada. However, the period of the 1960s through to the present have also seen tremendous accomplishments in English Canadian literature. Writers from English-speaking Canada such as Margaret Atwood, Mordecai Richler, Margaret Laurence, Robertson Davies, Timothy Findley, and Carol Shields dissected the experience of English Canadians or of life in English Canadian society. and assumed a place among the world's best-known English-language literary figures. Journalist Pierre Berton wrote a number of books popularizing Canadian history which had a particular resonance among English-speaking Canadians, while critics and philosophers such as Northrop Frye and John Ralston Saul have attempted to analyze the Canadian experience. Still, particularly at the academic level, debate continues as to the nature of English Canada and the extent to which English Canadians exist as an identifiable identity.

== Demography ==
Canadians of English descent total population (1871−2021)
Note1: 1981 Canadian census did not include multiple ethnic origin responses, thus population is an undercount.
Note2: 1996-present census populations are undercounts, due to the creation of the "Canadian" ethnic origin category.
Canadians of English descent percentage of the total population (1871−2021)
Note1: 1981 Canadian census did not include multiple ethnic origin responses, thus population is an undercount.
Note2: 1996-present census populations are undercounts, due to the creation of the "Canadian" ethnic origin category.

=== Population ===
Ethnic English Canadian Population History 1871−2021
Year	Population	% of total population
1871	706,369	20.264%
1881	881,301	20.378%
1901	1,260,899	23.475%
1911	1,871,268	25.966%
1921	2,545,358	28.964%
1931	2,741,419	26.419%
1941	2,968,402	25.797%
1951	3,630,344	25.914%
1961	4,195,175	23.002%
1971	6,247,585	28.967%
1981	7,060,470	29.317%
1986	9,311,910	37.215%
1991	8,624,900	31.951%
1996	6,982,320	24.475%
2001	6,129,460	20.68%
2006	6,973,930	22.323%
2011	7,085,530	21.568%
2016	6,964,780	20.211%
2021	6,263,880	17.242%

=== Religion ===
English Canadian demography by religion
Religious group	2021 (Note: Religious breakdown proportions based on "English" ethnic or cultural origin response on the 2021 census.)		2001 (Note: Religious breakdown proportions based on "English" ethnic or cultural origin response on the 2001 census.)	
Religious group	Pop.	%	Pop.	%
Christianity	2,784,555	52.31%	4,629,025	77.42%
Islam	5,330	0.1%	6,070	0.1%
Irreligion	2,458,015	46.18%	1,288,610	21.55%
Judaism	16,470	0.31%	20,815	0.35%
Buddhism	8,905	0.17%	10,110	0.17%
Hinduism	1,820	0.03%	2,700	0.05%
Indigenous spirituality	3,095	0.06%	6,005	0.1%
Sikhism	1,445	0.03%	1,805	0.03%
Other	43,195	0.81%	13,730	0.23%
Total English Canadian population	5,322,830 ▼	100%	5,978,875	100%

Canadian demography by Christian sects
Religious group	2021		2001	
Religious group	Pop.	%	Pop.	%
Catholic	835,230	30%	1,176,285	25.41%
Orthodox	11,980	0.43%	12,540	0.27%
Protestant	1,563,060	56.13%	3,271,120	70.67%
Other Christian	374,285	13.44%	169,080	3.65%
Total English christian population	2,784,555	100%	4,629,025	100%

== Geographical distribution ==
Data from this section from Statistics Canada, 2021.

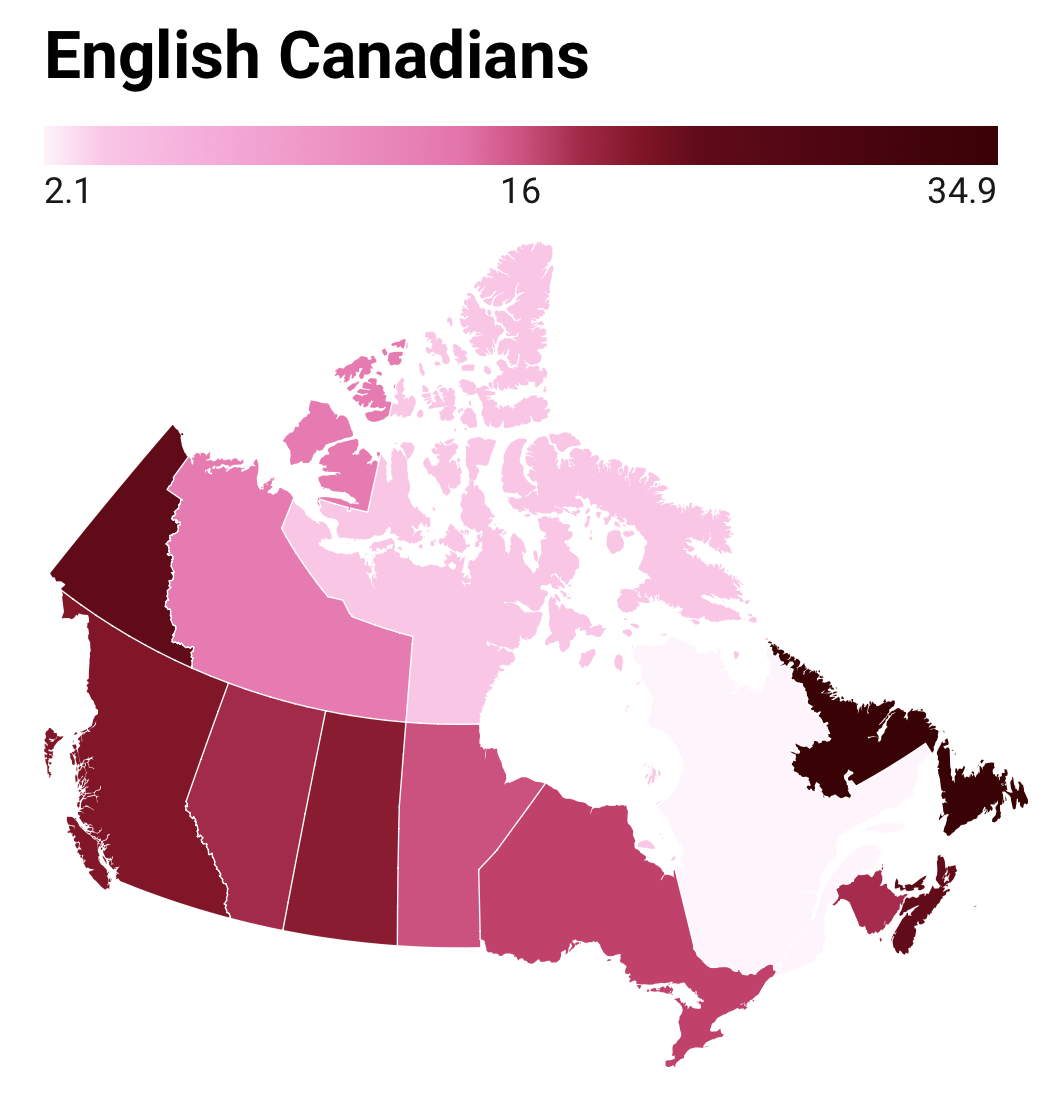
English per cent in Canadian province/territory, 2021 census

=== Provinces and territories ===
Province / Territory	Per cent English	Total English
Alberta	18.3%	766,070
British Columbia	20.7%	1,019,250
Manitoba	16.1%	210,285
New Brunswick	18.1%	137,145
Newfoundland and Labrador	34.9%	175,045
Northwest Territories	13.6%	5,495
Nova Scotia	22.8%	217,910
Nunavut	3.8%	1,405
Ontario	16.7%	2,347,685
Prince Edward Island	24.0%	36,050
Quebec	2.1%	177,710
Saskatchewan	19.9%	219,665
Yukon	23.0%	9,105
Canada — Total	14.7%	5,322,830

== Symbols ==
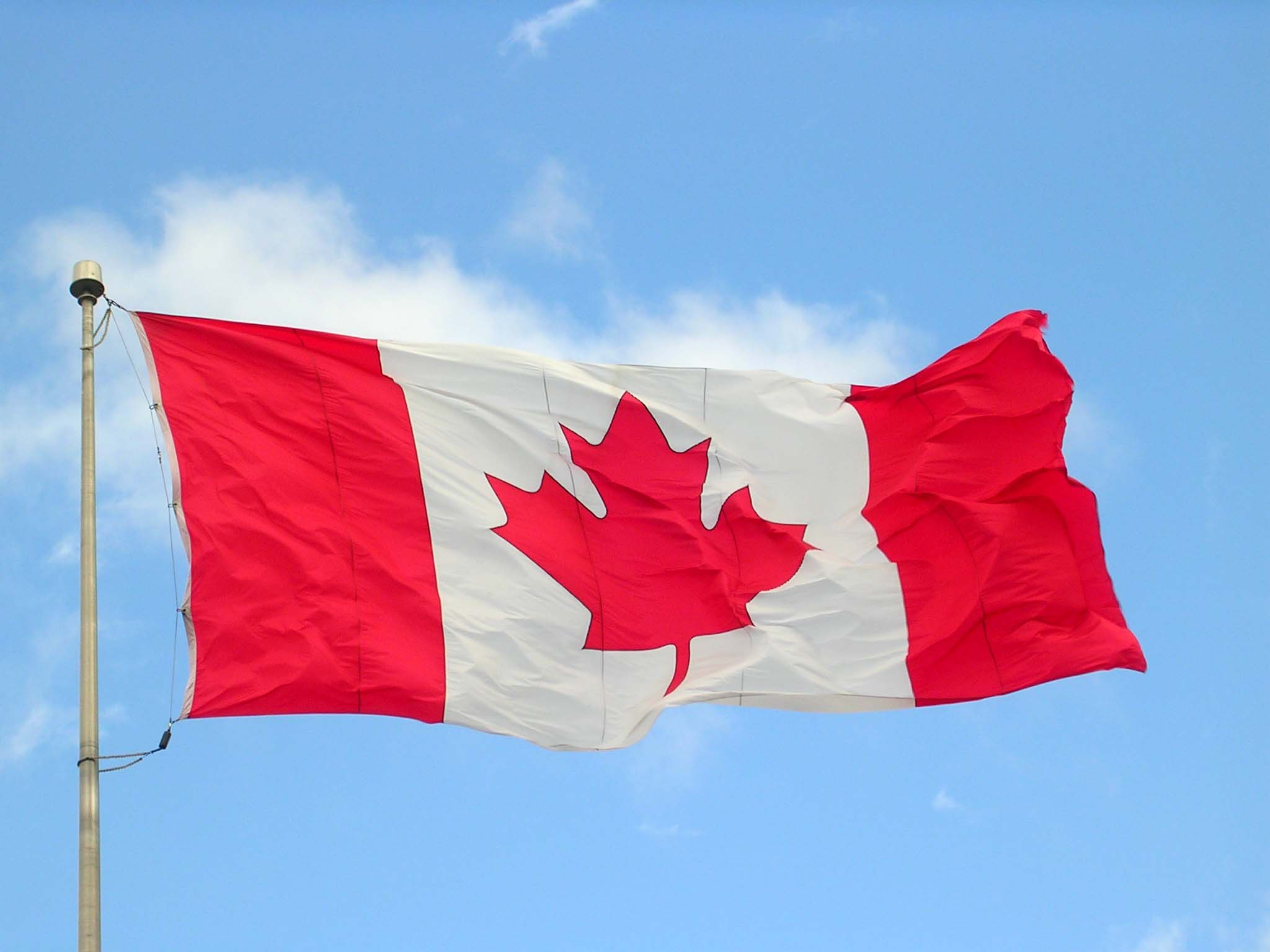
The Canadian flag flying at the Maritime Museum of the Atlantic, located at Halifax, Nova Scotia

1957 version of the Canadian Red Ensign that had evolved as the de facto national flag until 1965.

English-speaking Canadians have not adopted symbols specific to themselves. Although English Canadians are attached to the Canadian flag, it is the national flag and intended to be a symbol for all Canadians, regardless of ethnicity or language. The flag debate of 1965 revealed a strong attachment to the Canadian Red Ensign, previously flown as the flag of Canada prior to the adoption of the Maple Leaf in 1965. Even today, there is considerable support for use of the Red Ensign in certain specific circumstances, such as the commemoration ceremonies for the Battle of Vimy Ridge.

The maple leaf itself, as a symbol, was used as early as 1834 in what is now Quebec as a symbol of the Société St. Jean Baptiste but was adopted for use shortly afterwards by the English-speaking community in Canada. The "Maple Leaf Forever" was penned in 1867, at the time of Confederation, and was once regarded as an informal anthem for English Canadians, but the reaction by English-speaking Canadians to a decision of a New Brunswick school to stop the singing of the anthem are attached to the official national anthem, "O Canada", by Calixa Lavallée suggests that the official anthem enjoys considerable support.

The beaver is sometimes seen as another Canadian symbol but is not necessarily specific to English Canadians. It too was used originally in connection with the Société St. Jean Baptiste before coming into currency as a more general Canadian symbol. In the 1973 political satire by Stanley Burke, Frog Fables & Beaver Tales, a spoof on Canadian politics of the Pierre Trudeau era, English Canadians are depicted in the main as well-meaning but not terribly clever beavers (with other animals such as frogs, sea otters and gophers assigned to represent other linguistic and provincial populations). The historical relevance of the beaver stems from the early fur trade. It has been asserted, "The fur trade in general and the Hudson's Bay Company in particular exercised a profound influence on the sculpting of the Canadian soul."

The Crown has historically been an intangible but significant symbol for many English Canadians. Loyalty to Great Britain created the initial fracture lines between the populations of the Thirteen Colonies and the populations of Nova Scotia and Quebec at the time of the American Revolution and forced the flight of the Loyalists after the end of the war. As such, English Canada developed in the 19th century along lines that continued to emphasize this historical attachment, evident in the naming of cities, parks, and even whole provinces after members of the royal family; the retention of flags, badges, and provincial mottos expressive of loyalty; and enthusiastic responses to royal visits. While such loyalty is no longer as powerful a unifying force as it once was among English Canadians, it continues to exert a noticeable influence on English Canadian culture. According to the author and political commentator Richard Gwyn, "[t]he British connection has long vanished... it takes only a short dig down to the sedimentary layer once occupied by the Loyalists to locate the sources of a great many contemporary Canadian convictions and conventions." Gwyn considers that the modern equivalent of the once talismanic loyalty is "tolerance": "a quality now accepted almost universally as the feature that makes us a distinct people."

== Ethnic composition ==
The 2001 Census of Canada provides information about the ethnic composition of English-speaking Canadians. This "refers to the ethnic or cultural group(s) to which the respondent's ancestors belong". However, interpretation of data is complicated by two factors.

- Respondents were instructed to specify as many ethnic origins as applicable. Thus, if one has seven great-grandparents of English descent and one of Welsh descent, one will answer "English" and "Welsh" to this question, and in this example the representation of Welsh ancestry is exaggerated. This method is likely to lead to overrepresentation of smaller groups compared to the method in use until 1976, in which only paternal ancestry was reported.If on the other hand one restricts attention to single responses, groups which have arrived in Canada more recently will be overrepresented compared to groups which have been present longer.
- Non-Aboriginal respondents are not discouraged from providing responses denoting origins in North America. The most frequent of these is "Canadian". The response "Canadian" is in fact provided as an example in the census instructions, based on its frequency in past surveys.

See the definition of "ethnic origin" from the 2001 Census dictionary for further information.

The data in the following tables pertain to the population of Canada reporting English as its sole mother tongue, a total of 17,352,315 inhabitants out of 29,639,035. A figure for single ethnic origin responses is provide, as well as a total figure for ethnic origins appearing in single or multiple responses (for groups exceeding 2% of the total English-speaking population). The sum of the percentages for single responses is less than 100%, while the corresponding total for single or multiple responses is greater than 100%. The data are taken from the 2001 Census of Canada.

Ethnic group	Total responses	Percen- tage	Single responses	Percen- tage
Total	17,352,315	100.0%		
Canadian	6,244,055	36.0%	3,104,955	17.9%
English	5,809,805	33.5%	1,464,430	8.4%
Scottish	4,046,325	23.3%	592,825	3.4%
Irish	3,580,320	20.6%	457,985	2.6%
German	2,265,505	13.1%	385,760	2.2%
French	1,993,100	11.5%	158,400	0.9%
Ukrainian	877,690	5.1%	188,830	1.1%
Dutch	749,945	4.3%	184,415	1.1%
North American Indian	713,925	4.1%	280,795	1.6%
Italian	670,300	3.9%	234,610	1.4%
Polish	555,740	3.2%	72,110	0.4%
Norwegian	350,085	2.0%	38,980	0.2%

The remaining ethnic groups (single or multiple responses) forming at least 1% of the English-speaking population are Welsh (2.0%), Swedish (1.5%), Hungarian (1.5%), East Indian (1.4%), Métis (1.4%), Jewish (1.4%), Russian (1.4%), American (1.3%), Jamaican (1.2%) and Chinese (1.1%). The remaining ethnic groups (single response) forming at least 0.5% of the English-speaking population are East Indian (1.0%), Jamaican (0.8%) and Chinese (0.6%).

Depending on the principal period of immigration to Canada and other factors, ethnic groups (other than British Isles, French, and Aboriginal ones) vary in their percentage of native speakers of English. For example, while a roughly equal number of Canadians have at least partial Ukrainian and Chinese ancestry, 82% of Ukrainian Canadians speak English as their sole mother tongue, and only 17% of Chinese Canadians do (though this rises to 34% in the 0 to 14 age group). As the number of second and third-generation Chinese Canadians increases, their weight within the English-speaking population can also be expected to increase. It should also be borne in mind that some percentage of any minority ethnic group will adopt French, particularly in Quebec.

== Culture ==
=== Language ===
In the 2001 Canadian census, 17,572,170 Canadians indicated that they were English-speaking. As discussed in the Introduction, however, this does not mean that 17.5 million people in Canada would necessarily self-identify as being 'English Canadian'.

Except in Newfoundland and the Maritime provinces, most Canadian English is only subtly different from English spoken in much of the mid-western and western United States. Spoken English in the Maritimes has some resemblance to English of some of the New England states. While Newfoundland speaks a specific Newfoundland English dialect, and so has the most distinct accent and vocabulary, with the spoken language influenced in particular by English and Irish immigration. There are a few pronunciations that are distinctive for most English Canadians, such as 'zed' for the last letter of the alphabet.

English Canadian spelling continues to favour most spellings of British English, including 'centre', 'theatre', 'colour' and 'labour'. Other spellings, such as 'gaol' and 'programme', have disappeared entirely or are in retreat. The principal differences between British and Canadian spelling are twofold: '-ise' and '-yse' words ('organise/organize' and 'analyse' in Britain, 'organize' and 'analyze/analyse' in Canada), and '-e' words ('annexe' and 'grille' in Britain, 'annex' and 'grill' in Canada, but 'axe' in both, 'ax' in the USA).

Vocabulary of Canadian English contains a few distinctive words and phrases. In British Columbia, for example, the Chinook Jargon word 'skookum' for, variously, 'good', 'great', 'reliable', or 'durable', has passed into common use, and the French word 'tuque' for a particular type of winter head covering is in quite widespread use throughout the country.

Languages besides English are spoken extensively in provinces with English-speaking majorities. Besides French (which is an official language of the province of New Brunswick and in the three territories), indigenous languages, including Inuktitut and Cree are widely spoken and are in some instances influencing the language of English speakers, just as traditional First Nations art forms are influencing public art, architecture and symbology in English Canada. Immigrants to Canada from Asia and parts of Europe in particular have brought languages other than English and French to many communities, particularly Toronto, Vancouver and other larger centres. On the west coast, for example, Chinese and Punjabi are taught in some high schools; while on the east coast efforts have been made to preserve the Scots Gaelic language brought by early settlers to Nova Scotia. In the Prairie provinces, and to a lesser degree elsewhere, there are a large number of second-generation and more Ukrainian Canadians who have retained at least partial fluency in the Ukrainian language.

=== Religion ===
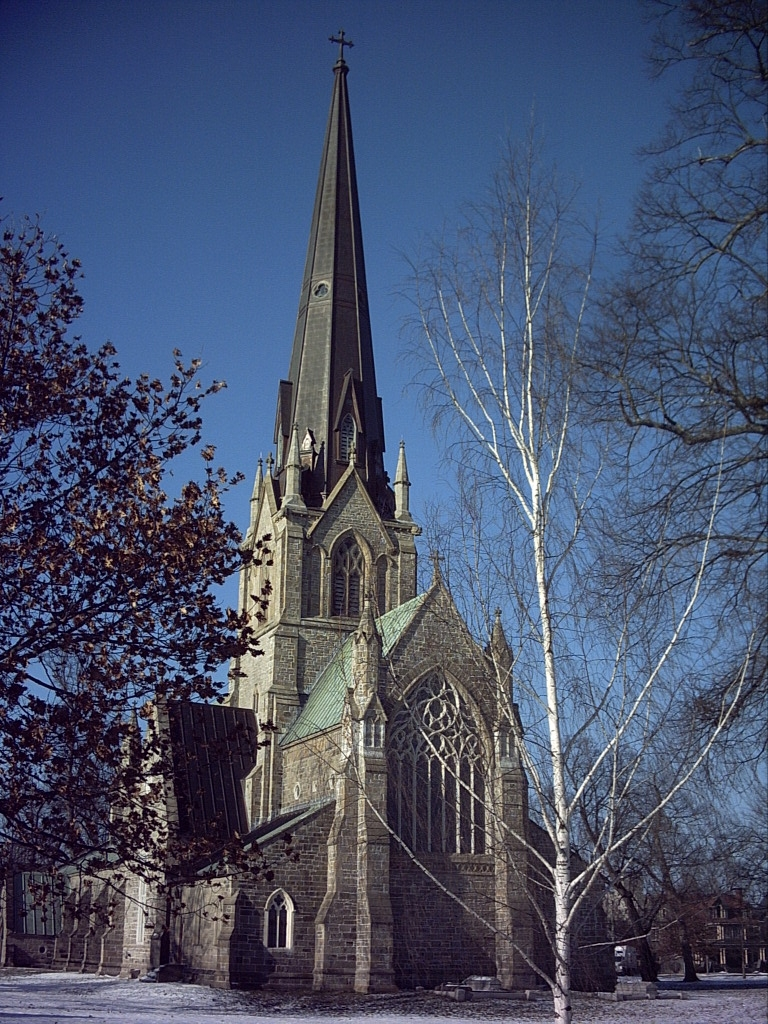
Christ Church Cathedral, Fredericton, construction began in 1845

The population of the provinces other than Quebec in the 2001 Census is some 22,514,455. It is impossible to know with certainty how many of that number would self-identify as 'English Canadians' under the broadest interpretation of the term. Persons self-identifying with 'English' as their primary ethnic origin as part of the 2001 census – Quebec included – totaled slightly less than 6,000,000 persons. However, many Canadians who identify other ethnic origins for the purpose of the census might identify as 'English Canadian' in the broader sense of 'English-speaking Canadians' and possibly share some cultural affinities with the group identifying itself as 'English Canadian' in the more limited sense.

Of the total population of the provinces outside Quebec, the following numbers provide an approximation of the two largest religious groupings: *Protestant: 8,329,260; *Roman Catholic: 6,997,190.

Those claiming no religious affiliation in 2001 numbered 4,586,900.

For comparison purposes, other religious groups in the provinces other than Quebec in 2001:

- Orthodox Christian: 379,245
- Other Christian: 723,700
- Muslim: 471,620
- Jewish: 340,080
- Hindu: 272,675
- Sikh: 270,185
- Buddhist: 258,965

In sum, while the single largest religious affiliation of 'English Canadians' – in the Rest of Canada sense of the term – may for convenience be slotted under the different Christian religions called Protestantism, it still represents a minority of the population at less than 37%. So-called 'English Canadians' include a large segment who do not identify as Christian. Even with a clear majority of almost 73%, English Canadian Christians represent a large diversity of beliefs that makes it exceedingly difficult to accurately portray religion as a defining characteristic.

=== Literature ===
Humour, often ironic and self-deprecating, played an important role particularly in early Canadian literature in English, such as Thomas Chandler Haliburton and Stephen Leacock.

In Survival: A Thematic Guide to Canadian Literature, Margaret Atwood's seminal book on Canadian Literature published in 1973, the author argues that much of Canadian literature in both English and French is linked thematically to the notion of personal and collective survival. This theme continues to reappear in more recent literary works, such as Yann Martel's Life of Pi, winner of the 2002 Booker Prize.

In the 1970s authors such as Margaret Laurence in The Stone Angel and Robertson Davies in Fifth Business explored the changing worlds of small town Manitoba and Ontario respectively. Works of fiction such as these gave an entire generation of Canadians access to literature about themselves and helped shape a more general appreciation of the experiences of English-speaking Canadians in that era.

=== Arts ===
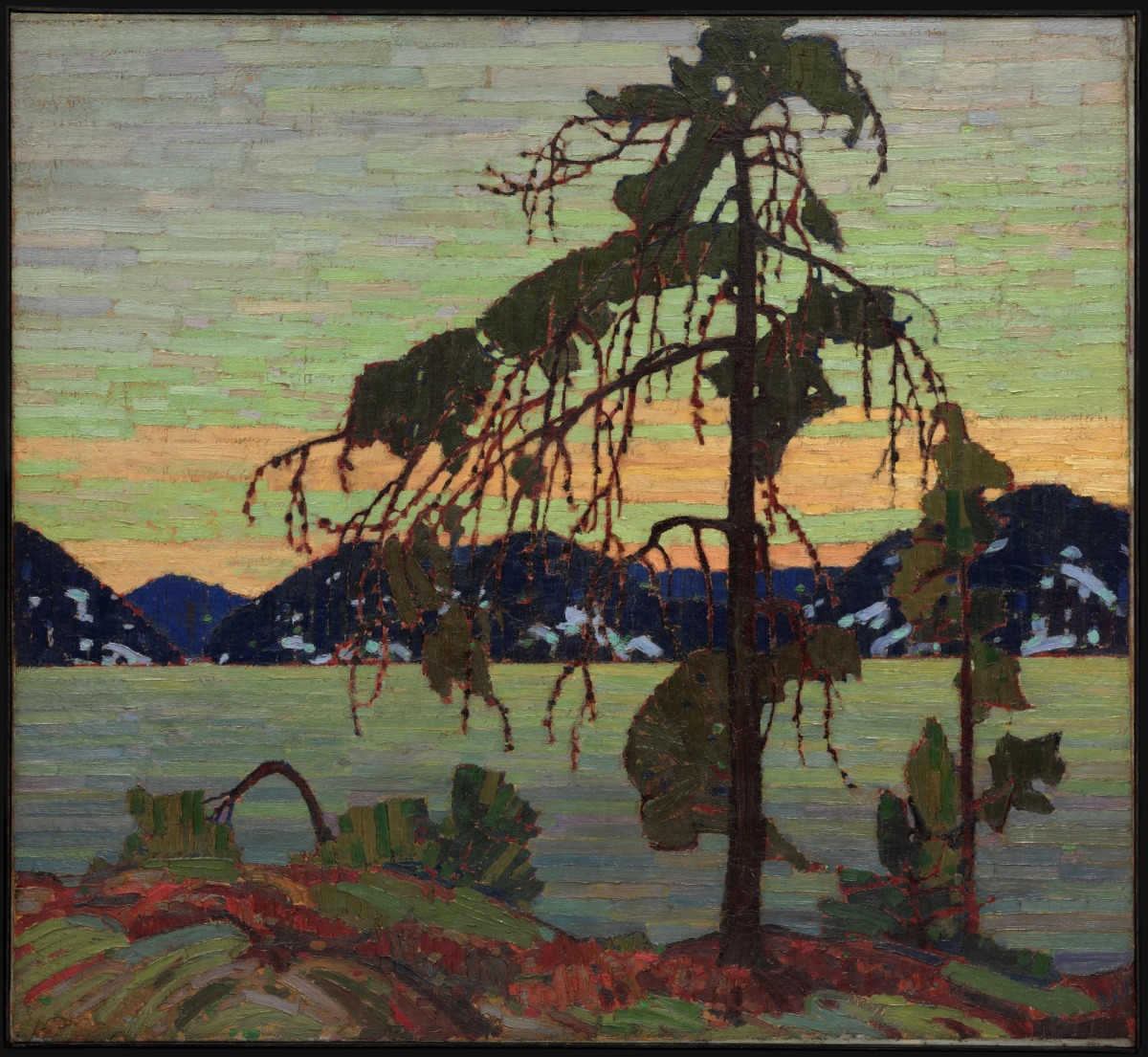
The Jack Pine by Tom Thomson

In the early years of the twentieth century, painters in both central Canada and the west coast began applying Post-Impressionist style to Canadian landscape paintings. Painters such as Tom Thomson and the Group of Seven, which included painters such as A.Y. Jackson, captured images of the wilderness in ways that forced English Canadians to discard their conservative and traditional views of art. In British Columbia, Emily Carr, born in Victoria in 1871, spent much of her life painting. Her early paintings of northwest coast aboriginal villages were critical to creating awareness and appreciation of First Nations cultures among English Canadians. The Arctic paintings of Lawren Harris, another member of the Group of Seven, are also highly iconic for English Canadians. Cowboy artist and sculptor Earl W. Bascom of Alberta became known as the "dean of Canadian cowboy sculpture" with his depictions of early cowboy and rodeo life.

=== Heroes, heroines and national myths ===
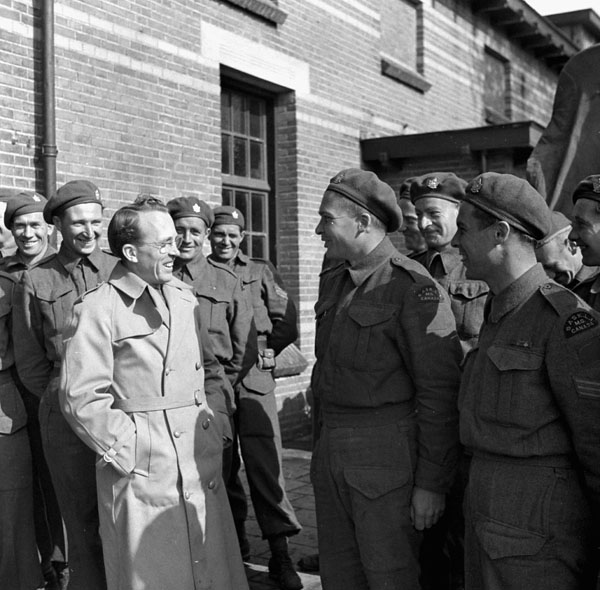
Tommy Douglas (centre left).

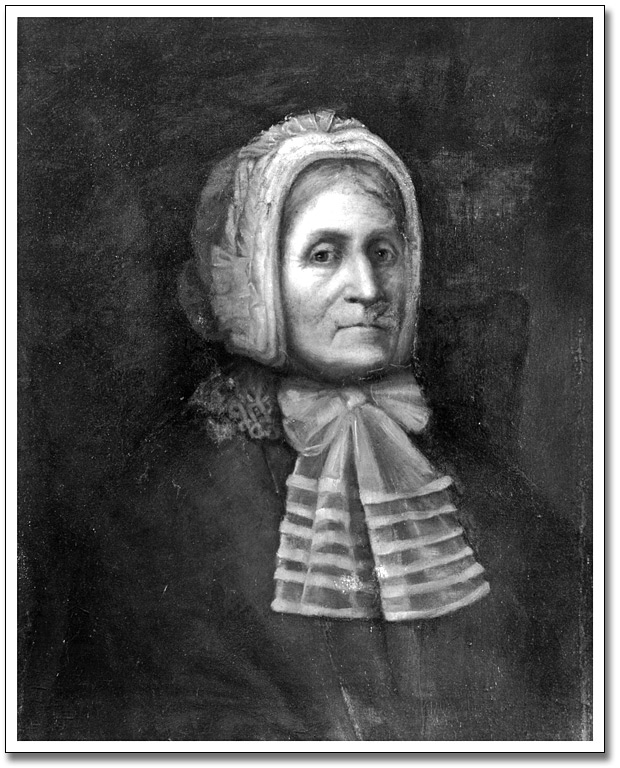
Painting of Loyalist heroine Laura Secord by Mildred Peel

From colonial times the arrival and settlement of the first pioneers, the fur trade empire established by the North West Company and the Hudson's Bay Company – although the fur company histories are more relevant to French Canadians, Métis and Scottish Canadians – as well as the mass resettlement of refugee Loyalists are important starting points for some English Canadians. Some have argued that the Loyalist myth, so often accepted without second thought, represents also a collective English Canadian myth-making enterprise

The War of 1812 produced one of the earliest national heroes, Laura Secord, who is credited with having made her way through American lines at night to carry a warning to British troops of impending American plans and contributing to the victory at the Battle of Beaver Dams, where the American advance into Upper Canada was turned back.

The War of 1812 also saw the capture and burning of Washington, D.C. by the British in August 1814, an event still remembered in English Canada. The War of 1812 itself, to which Canadian and aboriginal militia forces made important contributions, is viewed as the event that ensured the survival of the colonies that would become Canada, or, as termed by the critic Northrop Frye "in many respects a war of independence for Canada."

There is an element of the heroic that attaches to Sir John A. Macdonald, the Scottish lawyer from Kingston, Ontario, who became Canada's first prime minister. His weaknesses (such as an alleged fondness for alcohol, and the multifaceted corruption inherent in the Pacific Scandal) and the controversial events surrounding the rebellions in the west have not erased admiration for his accomplishments in nation building for English Canadians. Macdonald's pragmatism laid the foundation of the national myth of the 'two founding nations' (English and French), which was to endure well into the twentieth century among a strong minority of English Canadians and was eventually reflected in the official government policy that flowed from the Royal Commission on Bilingualism and Biculturalism in the 1960s.

Macdonald was also instrumental in the founding of the North-West Mounted Police in 1875, forerunners of the Royal Canadian Mounted Police (RCMP) Canada's iconic national police force. The RCMP itself, established to "subdue the West", i.e. the newly acquired Northwest Territories, formerly the HBC's Rupert's Land, as declared in the preamble to its charter. The RCMP, long since eulogized into a moral, symbolic image of Canadian authority, far from its true nature as a paramilitary force commissioned with bringing First Nations and Métis to heel, plays a role in English Canada's perception of itself as a nation of essentially law-abiding citizens that confederated in 1867 for the purposes of establishing peace, order and good government.

The Klondike Gold Rush of 1898 in the Yukon was another event that resonated in the English Canadian imagination, with its stories of adventure and struggle in a harsh northern environment. The myth of the North itself, the forbidding landscape and difficult climate, peopled by the hardy Inuit is of central importance to English Canadians, from Susanna Moodie (whose 'north' was the 'wilderness' of 1830s southern Ontario) to the present, as the myth of the north is reexamined, challenged and reinvented for an increasingly post-colonial culture.

In the twentieth century Tommy Douglas, the politician from Saskatchewan who is credited with the creation of Canada's programme of universal health care has been recognized as the greatest Canadian in a contest sponsored by the Canadian Broadcasting Corporation, Canada's national public broadcaster. Lester B. Pearson, winner of the Nobel Peace Prize and Prime Minister of Canada responsible for the adoption of the maple leaf flag, is widely regarded as an English Canadian figure.

Another person who had an enormous impact on English Canadians was British Columbian Terry Fox whose 1981 attempt to run across Canada from St. John's, Newfoundland to the Pacific to raise money for cancer research. Although forced to discontinue the run near Thunder Bay due to a recurrence of his cancer, Terry Fox captured the imagination of millions of Canadians, particularly in the English-speaking provinces. This feat was followed by British Columbian Rick Hansen's successful Man in Motion tour shortly afterwards.

Sports heroes include, among many others, the legendary Wayne Gretzky from Ontario who led the Edmonton Oilers to successive Stanley Cup victories in the 1980s; the women's Olympic hockey team that won the Gold Medal in the 1992 Winter Olympics in Salt Lake City and Team Canada that won the famed Canada-Russia hockey series in 1972.

Rodeo is a popular sport in Canada. One of the great legends of Canadian rodeo is Ray Knight, known as the "Father of Canadian Professional Rodeo" having produced Canada's first professional rodeo in 1903. Another Canadian rodeo legend is Earl Bascom. Bascom, is known as the "Father of Modern Rodeo" for his rodeo equipment inventions and innovations, was the first rodeo champion to be inducted into Canada's Sports Hall of Fame.

Other significant figures include Nellie McClung (activist in politics and women's rights), Emily Carr (post-impressionist artist), Billy Bishop (World War I airman), Dr. Frederick Banting (co-discover of insulin) and Dr. Norman Bethune (doctor in China). Alexander Graham Bell, inventor of the telephone, is often claimed by English Canada because of his residence on Cape Breton Island, although he was born in Scotland and later moved to the United States.

At the same time, historian and author Charlotte Gray has described Canadians as people who do not do heroes or hero-worship well, preferring instead to celebrate the collective rather than the individual: "[t]he qualities that are celebrated in our national life today are collective virtues - the bravery of our peace-keepers, the compassion of all Canadians for Manitoba's flood victims … individualism has never been celebrated in Canada. It is not a useful quality for a loose federation perched on a magnificent and inhospitable landscape …"

The contribution of French-speaking Canadians to the culture of English Canada is significant. Many popular Canadian symbols such as the maple leaf and the beaver were first adopted by Francophones. Francophone sports figures (particularly in hockey and figure-skating) have always been highly regarded. Sir Wilfrid Laurier, Prime Minister in the early 20th century, is viewed as an important statesman in English Canada. A more controversial figure is Pierre Trudeau, who is often praised for his handling of the October Crisis (also known as the FLQ Crisis) and the process of constitutional reform that implemented the Canadian Charter of Rights and Freedoms but who also caused considerable Western Alienation and has been criticised for the critical failure to bring Quebec into the 1982 agreement on constitutional reform. Trudeau was nevertheless ranked 3rd in the Canadian Broadcasting Corporation's contest to choose The Greatest Canadian. Haitian-born Francophone Michaëlle Jean, a former Governor-General, has overcome some initial misgivings regarding her appointment. The motto chosen for her arms, Briser les solitudes (break down the solitudes), echoes one of the significant works of early English Canadian fiction, Hugh MacLennan's Two Solitudes which describes the sometimes painful separateness dividing Canada's English and French-speaking populations.

Canada's role in the First and Second World Wars played a large part in the political evolution of Canada and the identity of English Canadians. After the fall of France in 1940 and prior to the entry of the United States into the war in 1942, Canada saw itself as Britain's principal ally against Adolf Hitler. The well-known poem "In Flanders Fields", written during the First World War by John McCrae of Guelph, Ontario, is associated with Remembrance Day.

=== Popular culture ===
The RCMP "Mountie" has become a figure associated with Canada in the popular imagination of not only Canada, but other countries as well. Although it has many Francophone officers, in popular culture the mountie has been typically represented by an anglophone, such as Dudley Do-Right, Benton Fraser or Sergeant Preston of the Yukon. The myth of the stalwart (if somewhat rustic) heroic Canadian also appeared in the form of Johnny Canuck, a comic book figure of the mid-twentieth century.

Anne of Green Gables by Lucy Maud Montgomery of Prince Edward Island is one of English Canada's best known contribution to general popular culture. The themes of gentle slapstick and ironic but affectionate observation of small-town Canadian life that appeared in the work of Stephen Leacock carried forward into the later part of the twentieth century to reappear in successful television sitcoms such as The Beachcombers, Corner Gas and Little Mosque on the Prairie.

Canadian humour took on an even broader form in the comedy of SCTV, in particular the Great White North sketches, The Red Green Show and more recently Trailer Park Boys.

Traditional music in much of English-speaking Canada has sources in the music of Scotland and Ireland, brought to Newfoundland and the Maritime provinces in the 19th century. In the late 20th Century, Maritime artists, particularly musicians from Cape Breton Island such as Rita MacNeil, the Rankin Family, Natalie MacMaster and Ashley MacIsaac and Great Big Sea from Newfoundland achieved substantial popularity and influence throughout English Canada. A Celtic influence is similarly felt in the work of musicians from other parts of Canada, such as Spirit of the West, from British Columbia, Ontarian Stan Rogers, or Manitoba-born Loreena McKennitt.

== See also ==
- English-speaking Quebecers
- British North America
- Culture of Canada
- List of English Canadians
- British diaspora in Africa
- Canada–United Kingdom relations
