= Corriveau =

Corriveau is a French surname. Notable people with the surname include:

- Marie-Josephte Corriveau (1733–1863), Canadian murderer
- André Corriveau (filmmaker), film editor and director from Quebec, Canada
- André Corriveau (ice hockey) (1928–1993), retired Canadian professional ice hockey forward
- Antoine Corriveau (born 1985), Canadian singer-songwriter and author
- François Corriveau (born 1969), politician in Quebec, Canada
- Georges Corriveau (born 1951), Canadian politician
- Jacques Corriveau (c. 1933–2018), Quebec businessperson and owner of the graphic design firm Pluri Design Canada Inc
- John Dennis Corriveau, OFM Cap (born 1941), Canadian prelate of the Roman Catholic Church
- Larissa Corriveau, Canadian actress
- Léopold Corriveau (1926–1998), Liberal party member of the Canadian House of Commons
- Michel Corriveau (born 1962), Canadian composer of film and television scores
- Monique Corriveau (1927–1976), Canadian writer
- Raúl Corriveau (1930–2025), Canadian Roman Catholic bishop
- Thomas Corriveau (born 1957), Canadian artist and filmmaker
- Yvon Corriveau (born 1967), Canadian retired ice hockey left winger
