= Gary Cloutier =

American lawyer

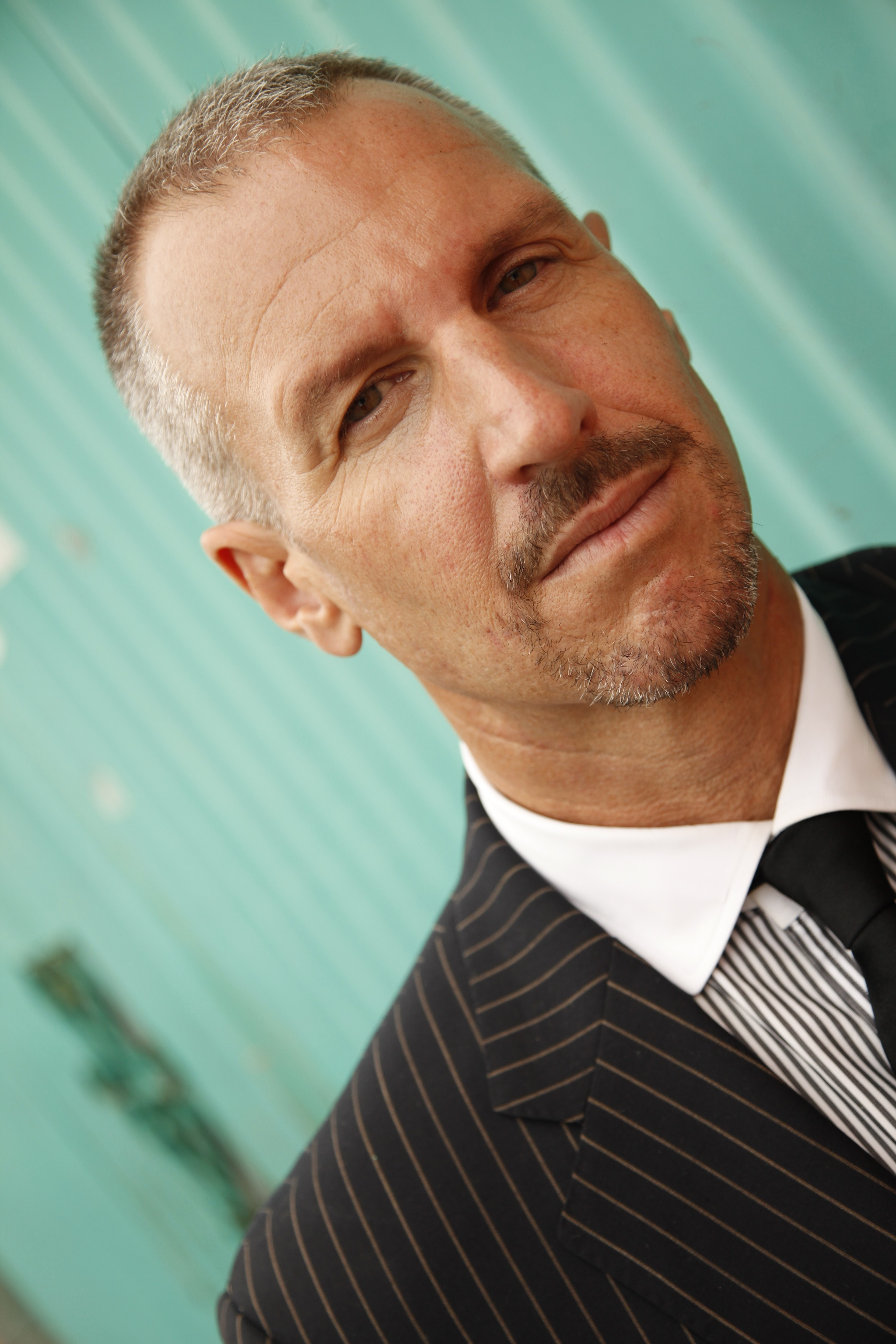

Gary Cloutier is a citizen activist and formerly elected mayor of Vallejo, California. Elected on November 21, 2007, and sworn in on December 4, 2007, he was replaced on December 7 when his opponent, Osby Davis, requested a recount that showed Davis had won the election.

== Early years ==
Cloutier grew up in Rhode Island and received a BA in Political Science from Brown University, where he was an all-Ivy defensive tackle and the winner of the Eugene Swift award. He received a law degree from Suffolk Law School in 1991.

Between these two educational pursuits, Cloutier served as a legislative aide for Sen. Claiborne Pell (D-RI).

== Legal career ==
Cloutier is the former law partner of pioneering gay civil rights lawyer Paul Wotman. Wotman and Cloutier were among the first lawyers in the State of California to make new law under the Americans with Disabilities Act for same- and opposite-sex couples who had been discriminated against in seeking life insurance due to the HIV status of one partner. In one of the first refusal to treat cases to go to trial since the United States Supreme Court ruled that people with asymptomatic HIV are protected by disability law, he won a significant verdict against a University of California surgeon who refused to operate on an HIV positive patient with avascular necrosis.

In the more recent San Francisco Superior Court case of Gohstand v. Leibert, he obtained a large and highly publicized settlement on behalf of a straight man who was beaten outside a gay bar by two students from UC Berkeley who believed the victim was gay.

== Political career ==
Cloutier's political career began with an involvement in the city government of Vallejo, California. He was first elected to the position of city councilmember in 1999, and continued to serve as councilmember and vice-mayor over the next eight years.

In 2007, Cloutier participated in the mayoral race in Vallejo against real estate attorney Osby Davis. Both candidates represented a first for the city of Vallejo: Cloutier would be the first openly gay mayor of Vallejo, whereas Davis would be its first African-American mayor. The initial count of the voting results indicated that Cloutier had won the seat. He was elected on November 21, 2007, and was sworn in on December 4, 2007. However, when Davis requested a recount shortly thereafter, the results showed that Davis was the winner, and so the position was transferred.

== Arrest ==
On November 17, 2007, Cloutier was arrested for charges of public intoxication in Palm Springs. He spent five hours in jail and was released. At a press conference outside Vallejo City Hall, Cloutier said he "...Made a mistake that I deeply regret... I had too much to drink...[and] I make no excuses, and I accept full responsibility for my actions. I have embarrassed myself, concerned my colleagues and disappointed my supporters. I deeply regret my actions, and apologize to the people I've let down, especially those who have worked so hard on my campaign." Cloutier also said it would never happen again.

The matter was dismissed after Cloutier pleaded to lesser charges stemming from the arrest and paid a $100 fine.

== Aftermath ==
After the Vallejo mayoral race, Cloutier moved on to work as an aide to the Mayor and Commissioner of the City of Miami Beach.

In 2010, he published a book, Rough Point, on his experience as an athlete, civil rights lawyer and politician.

He also started maintaining a blog, "Among The Hogs," that is dedicated to the art of living well in a great democracy.

In March 2012, he was inducted into the Westerly High School Athletic Hall of Fame.

== Groundwork Providence ==
In May 2012, Cloutier was taken on as Executive Director of Groundwork Providence. Groundwork Providence is an environmental and community development trust in Providence, Rhode Island. In January 2013, Citizens Bank awarded Groundwork Providence its "Champions in Action" award, which is given annually to the best non-profit organization in the state of Rhode Island.

In August 2013, Cloutier left Groundwork Providence to return to practicing law in San Francisco.
