= André Corriveau (ice hockey) =

Canadian ice hockey player

- Born: May 15, 1928; Granby, Quebec, Canada
- Died: October 1, 1993 (aged 65)
- Height: 5 ft 8 in (173 cm)
- Weight: 134 lb (61 kg; 9 st 8 lb)
- Position: Right wing
- Shot: Left
- Played for: Montreal Canadiens
- Playing career: 1946–1957

Joseph Alfred André Corriveau (May 15, 1928 – October 1, 1993) was a Canadian professional ice hockey forward. He played three games in the National Hockey League for the Montreal Canadiens during the 1953–54 season. The rest of his career, which lasted from 1946 to 1957, was spent in the minor leagues. Corriveau was born in Grand-Mère, Quebec.

== Career statistics ==
=== Regular season and playoffs ===
			Regular season					Playoffs
Season	Team	League	GP	G	A	Pts	PIM	GP	G	A	Pts	PIM
1944–45	Montreal Nationale	QJHL	10	2	4	6	4	—	—	—	—	—
1945–46	Montreal Nationale	QJHL	20	12	16	28	8	4	2	0	2	2
1946–47	Montreal Nationale	QJHL	26	33	46	79	26	11	12	14	26	12
1946–47	New York Rovers	EAHL	2	1	0	1	0	—	—	—	—	—
1947–48	Valleyfield Braves	QSHL	43	22	31	53	20	6	1	3	4	2
1948–49	Valleyfield Braves	QSHL	62	32	43	75	40	3	2	1	3	0
1949–50	Valleyfield Braves	QSHL	60	33	54	87	25	5	3	0	3	0
1950–51	Valleyfield Braves	QSHL	58	38	51	89	15	16	10	14	24	0
1951–52	Valleyfield Braves	QSHL	60	27	36	63	8	6	1	6	7	2
1952–53	Valleyfield Braves	QSHL	60	40	45	85	10	4	0	1	1	0
1953–54	Montreal Canadiens	NHL	3	0	1	1	0	—	—	—	—	—
1953–54	Valleyfield Braves	QSHL	69	37	51	88	8	7	3	4	7	2
1954–55	Valleyfield Braves	QSHL	56	31	32	63	28	—	—	—	—	—
1955–56	Montreal Royals	QSHL	62	37	40	77	2	11	1	7	8	2
1956–57	Montreal Royals	QSHL	63	22	34	56	8	3	1	1	2	2
QSHL totals			593	319	417	736	164	61	22	37	59	10
NHL totals			3	0	1	1	0	—	—	—	—	—
