= Arts council =

Non-profit organization dedicated to promoting the arts

An arts council is a government or private non-profit organization dedicated to promoting the arts; mainly by funding local artists, awarding prizes, and organizing arts events. They often operate at arms-length from the government to prevent political interference in their decisions.

== List of arts councils ==
The International Federation of Arts Councils and Culture Agencies (IFACCA) maintains a list of national arts councils on its website.

== North America ==
=== Canada ===
- Canada Council

Provincial

- British Columbia Arts Council
- Alberta Foundation for the Arts
- Saskatchewan Arts Board
- Manitoba Arts Council
- Ontario Arts Council
- Conseil des arts et des lettres du Québec
- Prince Edward Island Council of the Arts

Municipal

- Council for the Arts in Ottawa
- Kingston Arts Council
- Sudbury Arts Council
- Arts Council~Haliburton Highlands
- Spruce Grove Allied Arts Council

=== United States ===
- National Endowment for the Arts (NEA)

Regional councils

- Southeast Southern Arts Federation
- Mid-Atlantic Mid Atlantic Arts Foundation
- Northeast New England Foundation for the Arts
- Mid-America Mid-America Arts Alliance
- Mid-West Arts Midwest
- West Western States Arts Federation

==== States ====
===== California =====
California Arts Council (CAC)

- Alameda County: Alameda County Arts Commission
  - City of Alameda: Alameda Arts Council (AAC)
- Amador County: Amador County Arts Council (ACAC)
- Calaveras County: Calaveras County Arts Council
- Contra Costa County: Arts and Culture Commission of Contra Costa County
- Humboldt County: Humboldt Arts Council (HAC)
- Inyo County: Inyo Council for the Arts
- Lake County: Lake County Arts Council
- Los Angeles County: LA County Arts Commission
  - City of Los Angeles: City of Los Angeles Cultural Affairs Department
- Madera County: Madera County Arts Council
- Marin County: Marin Arts Council
- Mariposa County: Mariposa County Arts Council
- Mendocino County: Arts Council of Mendocino County (ACMC)
- Merced County: Merced County Arts Council (MCAC)
- Modoc County: Modoc County Arts Council
- Monterey County: Arts Council for Monterey County (ACMC)
- Napa County: Arts Council of Napa Valley (ACNV)
- Nevada County: Nevada County Arts Council (NCAC)
- Orange County: Arts Orange County (AOC)
- Placer County: Arts Council of Placer County (PlacerArts)
- Riverside County: Riverside Arts Council (RAC)
- Sacramento County: Sacramento Metropolitan Arts Commission (SMAC)
- San Bernardino County: Arts Council for San Bernardino County (Arts Connection)
- San Diego County: City of San Diego Commission for Arts and Culture
- San Francisco County: San Francisco Arts Commission (SFAC)
- San Luis Obispo County: San Luis Obispo County Arts Council
- Santa Barbara County: Santa Barbara County Arts Commission
- Santa Clara County: Arts Council Silicon Valley
- Shasta County: Shasta County Arts Council (SCAC)
- Siskiyou County: Siskiyou Arts Council
- Solano County: Solano County Arts Council
- Sonoma County: Cultural Arts Council of Sonoma County
- Sutter County: Yuba-Sutter Regional Arts Council (YSRAC)
- Tulare County: Arts Council of Tulare County
- Tuolumne County: Central Sierra Arts Council
- Ventura County: Ventura County Arts Council
- Yolo County: Yolo County Arts Council (YCAC)
- Yuba County: Yuba-Sutter Regional Arts Council (YSRAC)

===== Florida =====
- Florida Keys Council of the Arts

===== Minnesota =====
- Minneapolis Arts Commission

===== New York =====
- New York State Council on the Arts
- Bronx County: Bronx Council on the Arts
- Columbia, Greene, Schoharie County: CREATE Council on the Arts
- Queens County: Queens Council on the Arts
- Suffolk County: Arts Project of Cherry Grove
- Sullivan County: Delaware Valley Arts Alliance

===== North Carolina =====
- Hillsborough Arts Council
- Arts Council of Winston-Salem and Forsyth County
- The United Arts Council of Raleigh and Wake County
- Durham Arts Council
- The Beaufort County Arts Council

===== Oregon =====
Oregon Arts Commission

Arts Council of Lake Oswego

===== Pennsylvania =====
Pennsylvania Council on the Arts

===== Utah =====
- Utah Arts Council

== Europe ==
=== Bulgaria ===
- National Culture Fund of Bulgaria

=== Germany ===
- Akademie der Künste
- Kulturstiftung des Bundes

=== Ireland ===
- Arts Council of Ireland

=== Italy ===
- Italian Council

=== Isle of Man ===
- Isle of Man Arts Council

=== Luxembourg ===
- Kultur | lx - Arts Council Luxembourg

=== Malta ===
- Arts Council Malta

=== Norway ===
- Norsk Kulturråd

=== Sweden ===
- Swedish Arts Council

=== Switzerland ===
- Pro Helvetia
- Geneva art councils

=== United Kingdom ===
- Arts Council of Great Britain - broken up in 1994 into the following three:
  - Arts Council England
  - Scottish Arts Council
  - Arts Council of Wales
- Arts Council of Northern Ireland
- Cayman National Cultural Foundation, Cayman Islands

== Asia ==
=== India ===
- Indira Gandhi National Centre for the Arts

=== Pakistan ===
- Arts Council of Pakistan Karachi
- Pakistan National Council of the Arts

=== Philippines ===
- National Commission for Culture and the Arts

=== Singapore ===
- National Arts Council (Singapore)

=== Japan ===
- Arts Council Tokyo

== Africa ==
- Bomas of Kenya
- Baraza la Sanaa la Taifa, Tanzania
- National Arts Council of Zimbabwe

== Oceania ==
- Australia Council for the Arts
- Regional Arts Australia
- Creative New Zealand
