= Green Party of Canada candidates in the 2008 Canadian federal election =

This is a list of nominated candidates for the Green Party of Canada in the 40th Canadian federal election. Candidates ran in all but five ridings: Humber—St. Barbe—Baie Verte (NL), Cumberland—Colchester—Musquodoboit Valley (NS), Jonquière—Alma (QC), Saint-Laurent—Cartierville (QC), Sherbrooke (QC).

== Newfoundland and Labrador - 7 seats ==
Riding	Candidate	Notes	Gender	Residence	Occupation	Votes	%	Rank
Avalon	David Aylward		M			713	2.17	4th
Bonavista—Gander—Grand Falls—Windsor	Robert O'Connor		M			568	1.98	4th
Humber—St. Barbe—Baie Verte	no candidate					0		
Labrador	Nyssa McLeod		F			302	3.91	4th
Random—Burin—St. George's	Kaitlin Wainwright		F			462	1.98	4th
St. John's East	Howard Story		M			586	1.38	4th
St. John's South—Mount Pearl	Ted Warren		M			643	1.86	4th

== Prince Edward Island - 4 seats ==
Riding	Candidate	Notes	Gender	Residence	Occupation	Votes	%	Rank
Cardigan	Emma Daughton		F			713	3.71	5th
Charlottetown	Laura Bisaillon		F			858	4.83	4th
Egmont	Rebecca Ridlington		F			626	3.39	4th
Malpeque	Peter Bevan-Baker		M			1,291	6.86	4th

== Nova Scotia - 11 seats ==
Riding	Candidate	Notes	Gender	Residence	Occupation	Votes	%	Rank
Cape Breton—Canso	Dwayne McEachern		M			2,692	7.28	4th
Central Nova	Elizabeth May	Party leader.	F		Environmentalist	12,620	32.24	2nd
Cumberland—Colchester—Musquodoboit Valley	no candidate					0		
Dartmouth—Cole Harbour	Paul Shreenan		M			2,417	5.96	4th
Halifax	Darryl Whetter		M			3,891	8.72	4th
Halifax West	Michael Munday		M			2,921	7.08	4th
Kings—Hants	Brendan MacNeill		M			2,353	6.24	4th
Sackville—Eastern Shore	Noreen Hartlen		F			2,033	5.15	4th
South Shore—St. Margaret's	Michael Oddy		M			2,090	5.23	4th
Sydney—Victoria	Collin Harker		M			1,941	5.54	4th
West Nova	Ronald Mills		M			2,114	5.01	4th

== New Brunswick - 10 seats ==
Riding	Candidate	Notes	Gender	Residence	Occupation	Votes	%	Rank
Acadie—Bathurst	Michelle Aubin		F			904	2.01	4th
Beauséjour	Michael Milligan		M			3,187	7.19	4th
Fredericton	Mary Lou Babineau		F			4,273	10.16	4th
Fundy Royal	Erik Millett		M			2,443	7.32	4th
Madawaska—Restigouche	André Arpin		M			1,367	3.75	4th
Miramichi	Todd Smith		M			1,107	3.85	4th
Moncton—Riverview—Dieppe	Alison Ménard		F			4,037	8.79	4th
New Brunswick Southwest	Robert Boucher		M			1,667	5.56	4th
Saint John	Michael Richardson		M			1,888	5.42	4th
Tobique—Mactaquac	Mark Glass		M			1,810	5.76	4th

== Quebec - 75 seats ==
Riding	Candidate	Notes	Gender	Residence	Occupation	Votes	%	Rank
Bas-Richelieu—Nicolet—Bécancour	Rebecca Laplante	Laplante was eighteen years old at the time of the election and was a student in Quebec City.	F		Student	1,334	2.72	5th
Brome—Missisquoi	Pierre Brassard	Brassard was born in Montreal and has a diploma in financial administration from the Université du Québec à Montréal. He worked for Hydro Quebec from 1960 to 1996. He was elected to the Bromont city council in a 2000 by-election and served for two years before being defeated in 2002. He later attempted to return to council in 2005 and 2009.	M			1,784	3.58	5th
Outremont	François Pilon	Pilon was a Green Party candidate in 2006, 2007 (by-election), 2008, and 2011.	M			1,566	4.31	5th
Shefford	Michel Champagne	Champagne is an organic farmer and veteran member of Canada's environmental movement. He has studied at the University of Montreal. He ran for the House of Commons of Canada as a Natural Law candidate in a 1995 by-election, later joined the Green Party, and has stood as a party candidate in two elections. He has also sought election at the municipal level.	M			1,848	3.66	5th
Abitibi—Baie-James—Nunavik—Eeyou	Patrick Rancourt		M			928	3.34	5th
Abitibi—Témiscamingue	Bruno Côté		M			976	2.23	5th
Ahuntsic	Lynette Tremblay		F			1,228	2.57	5th
Alfred-Pellan	Tristan Desjardins Drouin		M			1,665	3.13	5th
Argenteuil—Papineau—Mirabel	Pierre Audette		M			2,055	3.74	5th
Beauce	Nicolas Rochette		M			2,436	4.77	5th
Beauharnois—Salaberry	David Smith		M			1,764	3.28	5th
Beauport—Limoilou	Luc Côté		M			1,363	2.78	5th
Berthier—Maskinongé	Denis Lefebvre		M			1,691	3.11	5th
Bourassa	François Boucher		M			1,166	2.92	5th
Brossard—La Prairie	Sonia Ziadé		F			1,816	3.10	5th
Chambly—Borduas	Olivier Adam		M			2,460	3.88	5th
Charlesbourg—Haute-Saint-Charles	François Bédard		M			1,231	2.46	5th
Châteauguay—Saint-Constant	Brian Sarwer-Foner		M			1,755	3.18	5th
Chicoutimi—Le Fjord	Jean-François Veilleux		M			1,193	2.50	5th
Compton—Stanstead	Gary Caldwell		M			2,368	4.87	5th
Drummond	Réginald Gagnon		M			1,144	2.52	5th
Gaspésie—Îles-de-la-Madeleine	Julien Leblanc		M			1,136	3.11	5th
Gatineau	David Inglis		M			1,342	2.57	5th
Haute-Gaspésie—La Mitis—Matane—Matapédia	Louis Drainville		M			1,139	3.57	5th
Hochelaga	Philippe Larochelle		M			1,946	4.26	5th
Honoré-Mercier	Gaëtan Bérard		M			1,380	2.80	5th
Hull—Aylmer	Frédéric Pouyot		M			2,774	5.26	5th
Jeanne-Le Ber	Véronik Sansoucy		F			2,345	4.78	5th
Joliette	Annie Durette		F			2,588	4.84	5th
Jonquière—Alma	No Candidate					0	–	–
La Pointe-de-l'Île	Domita Cundari		F			1,340	2.89	5th
Lac-Saint-Louis	Peter Graham		M			4,415	8.58	4th
LaSalle—Émard	Kristina Vitelli		F			1,579	3.72	5th
Laurentides—Labelle	Jacques Rigal		M			2,094	3.95	5th
Laurier—Sainte-Marie	Dylan Percival-Maxwell		M			3,801	7.92	4th
Laval	Eric Madelein		M			1,607	3.18	5th
Laval—Les Îles	Brent Neil		M			1,752	3.28	5th
Lévis—Bellechasse	Lynne Champoux-Williams		F			1,370	2.54	5th
Longueuil—Pierre-Boucher	Danielle Moreau		F			1,752	3.50	5th
Lotbinière—Chutes-de-la-Chaudière	Shirley Picknell		F			1,265	2.44	5th
Louis-Hébert	Michèle Fontaine		F			1,408	2.43	5th
Louis-Saint-Laurent	Jean Cloutier					1,260	2.51	5th
Manicouagan	Jacques Gélineau		M			1,112	2.60	5th
Marc-Aurèle-Fortin	Lise Bissonnette		F			2,178	3.88	5th
Mégantic—L'Érable	Jean Guernon		M			959	2.16	5th
Montcalm	Michel Paulette		M			1,854	3.08	5th
Montmagny—L'Islet—Kamouraska—Rivière-du-Loup	Claude Gaumond		M			978	2.20	5th
Montmorency—Charlevoix—Haute-Côte-Nord	Jacques Legros		M			1,147	2.70	5th
Mount Royal	Tyrell Alexander		M			1,565	4.42	4th
Notre-Dame-de-Grâce—Lachine	Jessica Gal		F			3,378	7.71	5th
Papineau	Ingrid Hein		F			1,213	2.84	5th
Pierrefonds—Dollard	Ryan Young		M			3,161	6.91	5th
Pontiac	André Sylvestre		M			2,148	5.01	5th
Portneuf—Jacques-Cartier	Nathan John Weatherdon		M			1,452	3.20	5th
Québec	Yonnel Bonaventure		M			1,650	3.27	5th
Repentigny	Paul W. Fournier		M			1,666	2.85	5th
Richmond—Arthabaska	François Fillon		M			1,337	2.57	5th
Rimouski-Neigette—Témiscouata—Les Basques	James D. Morrison		M			645	1.63	6th
Rivière-des-Mille-Îles	Marie Martine Bédard		F			2,134	5.42	5th
Rivière-du-Nord	René Piché					1,656	3.34	5th
Roberval—Lac-Saint-Jean	Jocelyn Tremblay		F			737	2.00	5th
Rosemont—La Petite-Patrie	Vincent Larochelle		M			2,406	4.59	5th
Saint-Bruno—Saint-Hubert	Simon Bernier		M			2,031	3.84	5th
Saint-Hyacinthe—Bagot	Jacques Tétreault		M			1,771	3.70	5th
Saint-Jean	Pierre Tremblay		M			2,160	4.04	5th
Saint-Lambert	Diane Joubert		F			1,566	3.60	5th
Saint-Laurent—Cartierville	No Candidate (Note: No candidate due to deal between Elizabeth May and Liberal Party leader Stéphane Dion not to run candidates in each other's ridings.)					0	–	–
Saint-Léonard—Saint-Michel	Frank Monteleone		M			1,063	2.81	5th
Saint-Maurice—Champlain	Martial Toupin		M			1,562	3.37	5th
Sherbrooke	No Candidate					0	–	–
Terrebonne—Blainville	Martin Drapeau		M			1,714	3.17	5th
Trois-Rivières	Ariane Blais		F			1,540	3.11	5th
Vaudreuil—Soulanges	Jean-Yves Massenet		M			2,625	2.11	5th
Verchères—Les Patriotes	Annie Morel		F			1,679	3.09	5th
Westmount—Ville-Marie	Claude William Genest		M			2,733	7.04	5th

== Ontario - 106 seats ==
Riding	Candidate	Notes	Gender	Residence	Occupation	Votes	%	Rank
Ajax—Pickering	Mikhel Harilaid		M			3,543		
Algoma—Manitoulin—Kapuskasing	Lorraine Rekmans		F			1,451		
Ancaster—Dundas—Flamborough—Westdale	Peter Ormond		M			5,149		
Barrie	Erich Jacoby-Hawkins		M			5,921		
Beaches—East York	Zoran Markovski		M			4,389		
Bramalea—Gore—Malton	Mark Pajot		M			2,551		
Brampton—Springdale	Dave Finlay		M			3,516		
Brampton West	Patti Chmelyk		F		Healthcare Administrator	3,329		
Brant	Nora Fueten		F			3,805		
Bruce—Grey—Owen Sound	Dick Hibma		M			13,095		
Burlington	Marnie Mellish		F			4,083		
Cambridge	Scott Cosman		M			4,279		
Carleton—Mississippi Mills	Jake Cole		M			6,983		
Chatham-Kent—Essex	Alina Abbott		F			2,712		
Davenport	Wayne Scott		M			3,655		
Don Valley East	Wayne Clements		M			2,618		
Don Valley West	Georgina Wilcock		F			3,155		
Dufferin—Caledon	Ard Van Leeuwen		M			7,377		
Durham	Stephen Leahy		M			6,041		
Eglinton—Lawrence	Andrew James		M			3,629		
Elgin—Middlesex—London	Noel Burgon		M			3,241		
Essex	Richard Bachynsky	Richard Bachynsky is an environmentalist, writer, and consultant. Richard has been active in environmental interests since the mid-1980s, when he began to travel as a consultant. He was to see the complete disregard for environmental issues evident in both developing countries and North America. Richard was born and raised in the Windsor area, and has seen the rapid decline of the region in terms of jobs, environmental issues, and health related issues. With the failure of recent members of Parliament to attract new industry, improve the environment, or create better infrastructure, members of the community are motivated for change. A region rich in agriculture, industry, and resources, it is inconceivable – but true – that the region has one of Canada's highest unemployment rates. The residents of the region are being shortchanged, and need better federal support for job creation, tourism promotion, small business assistance, health care, and seniors. Active in finance, Richard has worked towards establishing new green industries including tire and industrial waste rubber recycling, biodiesel fuel plants, and alternative energy development worldwide. He also has extensive experience in real estate management and financing, and has served as a consultant for numerous firms completing projects both in Canada, and internationally. He currently holds of the position of Vice President International Sales and Finance for GreenShift Corporation, NY, NY USA, is Head of Export Finance Department, Roberts &Schaefer Engineering and Construction, USA., Finance Dir for Alternativa Corporation, Ukraine and is a Broker for Argentum Mortgages Toronto, and a consultant for Bachynsky Group, Bachynsky Realty Inc., and Bachynsky Mortgage Corporation, Windsor. Richard holds an MBA and is certified as a mortgage broker in Ontario. He is a member of the Board of the Amherstburg Chamber of Commerce. Previously, he was a member of parent and teacher association of F.J. Brennan High School in Windsor, and of the OMBA. In addition, he was active as a coach for minor hockey for the Windsor Minor Hockey Association, Riverside Hockey Association, and the Patterson Chiefs Hockey Program. Richard is the parent of 3 teenagers Erik, Laura, and Daniel. Richard Bachynsky was the candidate for the Green Party of Canada for the Federal election of 2008. Richard Bachynsky is currently the nominated candidate for the Green Party of Canada for the riding of Windsor-Tecumseh.	M			2,234		
Etobicoke Centre	Marion Schaffer		M			2,688		
Etobicoke—Lakeshore	David Corail		M			3,562		
Etobicoke North	Nigel Barriffe		M			1,460		
Glengarry—Prescott—Russell	Sylvie Lemieux		F					
Guelph	Mike Nagy		M					
Haldimand—Norfolk	Stephana Johnston		F					
Haliburton—Kawartha Lakes—Brock	Michael Bell	Michael Bell owns a publishing company, and has published The Wire and The Green Zine. He is also a singer-songwriter and has worked with the Peterborough Food Bank, Peterborough Flood Relief, World Vision, the United Way and Amnesty International. He has spent the majority of his life in Peterborough, although he says he became involved with the environmental movement while living in Australia between 2006 and 2008. He initially sought the Green Party nomination for Peterborough in the buildup to the 2008 election, but either withdrew from the contest or was defeated by rival candidate Emily Berrigan. Running in Haliburton—Kawartha Lakes—Brock, he limited his election expenses to only two dollars in 2008. He received 4,505 votes (8.29%), finishing fourth against Conservative incumbent Barry Devolin.	M		Publisher, Singer/songwriter			
Halton	Amy Collard		F					
Hamilton Centre	John Livingstone		M					
Hamilton East—Stoney Creek	Dave Hart Dyke		M					
Hamilton Mountain	Stephen Brotherston		M					
Huron—Bruce	Glen Smith		M					
Kenora	Jo Jo Holiday		F					
Kingston and the Islands	Eric Walton		M					
Kitchener Centre	John Bithell		M					
Kitchener—Conestoga	Jamie Kropf		M					
Kitchener—Waterloo	Cathy MacLellan		F					
Lambton—Kent—Middlesex	Jim Johnston		M					
Lanark—Frontenac—Lennox and Addington	Chris Walker		M					
Leeds—Grenville	Jeanie Warnock		F					
London—Fanshawe	Daniel O'Neail		M					
London North Centre	Mary Ann Hodge		F					
London West	Monica Jarabek		F					
Markham—Unionville	Leonard Aitken		M					
Mississauga—Brampton South	Grace Yogaretnam		F					
Mississauga East—Cooksville	Jaymini Bhikha		M					
Mississauga—Erindale	Richard Pietro		M					
Mississauga South	Richard Laushway		M					
Mississauga—Streetsville	Otto Casanova		M					
Nepean—Carleton	Lori Gadzala		F					
Newmarket—Aurora	Glenn Hubbers		M					
Niagara Falls	Shawn Willick		M					
Niagara West—Glanbrook	Sid Frere		M					
Nickel Belt	Frederick Twilley		M					
Nipissing—Timiskaming	Craig Bridges		M					
Northumberland—Quinte West	Ralph Torrie		M					
Oak Ridges—Markham	Richard Taylor		M					
Oakville	Blake Poland		M					
Oshawa	Pat Gostlin	Pat Gostlin was a retired teacher. She was killed in a car accident involving a suspected drunk driver on 26 October 2008, less than two weeks following the election.	F		retired teacher			
Ottawa Centre	Jen Hunter	Hunter has been an executive member of Equal Voice National Capital Chapter, has led an annual international Team Learning Adventure, was co-leader of a women's leadership event in Toronto, and was the first international board member for the Appalachian Trail Conservancy. She is also the founder of the Learning Catalyst. Hunter attended Queen's University, where she received her honours degree in political studies. Hunter chose to run for office in order to increase the number of women running. She believes in giving more federal money to cities, and in income splitting.	F					
Ottawa—Orléans	Paul Maillet		M					
Ottawa South	Qais Ghanem		M					
Ottawa—Vanier	Akbar Manoussi		M					
Ottawa West—Nepean	Frances Coates		F					
Oxford	Cathy Mott		F					
Parkdale—High Park	Robert L. Rishchynski		M					
Parry Sound-Muskoka	Glen Hodgson	Glen Hodgson was raised in Orillia. He has a bachelor's degree in English and Environmental Studies from Trent University and a Bachelor of Education degree from Queen's University. A high school teacher by profession, he is also a newspaper columnist and has served on the West Parry Sound District Museum and the Georgian Bay Biosphere Reserve. Hodgson joined the Green Party while attending Trent in the early 1990s, and has run for the party in four federal elections and one provincial election. He was nominated as the party's candidate for Parry Sound—Muskoka in the 2011 federal election. He briefly joined the Progressive Conservative Party of Canada in 1998 to support David Orchard's leadership bid. He criticized the heightened security at the 2010 G8 summit in Huntsville and the 2010 G20 summit in Toronto, and said that he would protest peacefully at the "People First! We Deserve Better" rally.	M		High school Teacher, Columnist			
Perth Wellington	John Cowling		M					
Peterborough	Emily Berrigan	Emily was twenty-one years old at the time of the election. She became active with the Green Party while attending high school in Port Hope, Ontario, and later worked for eight months at party headquarters in Ottawa. During the election, she noted that she was from a working class background. She received 4,029 votes (6.91%), finishing fourth against Conservative incumbent Dean Del Mastro. She later moved to Toronto and became project manager for a non-governmental organization. Berrigan was one of several people arrested on 26 June 2010, at the G20 Toronto protests. After taking part in non-violent protests, and wandering the streets in observation, she and a group of friends returned to Queen's Park in the evening for their bicycles. She was arrested while standing in the designated protest zone and taken to a detention centre, where she was kept in a small cage that was exposed to pepper spray and not given food or water for eight hours. She was released the next day, after being charged with obstruction and unlawful demonstration. Berrigan has described her arrest as "completely unacceptable" and the arrest conditions as "inhumane."	F					
Pickering—Scarborough East	Jason Becevello		M					
Prince Edward—Hastings	Alan Coxwell		M					
Renfrew—Nipissing—Pembroke	Ben Hoffman		M					
Richmond Hill	Dylan Marando		M					
St. Catharines	Jim Fannon		M					
St. Paul's	Justin Erdman		M					
Sarnia—Lambton	Alan McKeown		M					
Sault Ste. Marie	Luke Macmichael		M					
Scarborough—Agincourt	Adrian Molder		M					
Scarborough Centre	Ella Ng		F					
Scarborough-Guildwood	Alonzo Bartley		M					
Scarborough—Rouge River	Attila Nagy		M					
Scarborough Southwest	Stefan Dixon		M					
Simcoe—Grey	Peter Ellis		M					
Simcoe North	Valerie Powell		F					
Stormont—Dundas—South Glengarry	David Rawnsley		M					
Sudbury	Gordon Harris	Gordon has been a sales and marketing manager and a publisher. He moved to Sudbury in 2002 and became president of the Sudbury Arts Council in 2007. Before joining the Green Party, he worked on election campaigns for the Progressive Conservative Party of Ontario and the Liberal Party of Canada. He aligned with the Greens in the 2003 provincial election, and has served on the party's provincial executive. In the 2008 election, Harris said that he was not aligned with either a right-wing or left-wing ideology. He received 3,330 votes (7.75%), finishing fourth against New Democratic Party candidate Glenn Thibeault. He planned to seek the party's nomination again for the 2011 federal election, but later withdrew.	M		Arts Council Board Executive			
Thornhill	Norbert Koehl		M					
Thunder Bay—Rainy River	Russ Aegard		M					
Thunder Bay—Superior North	Brendan Hughes		M					
Timmins-James Bay	Larry Verner		M					
Toronto Centre	Ellen Michelson		F					
Toronto—Danforth	Sharon Howarth		F					
Trinity—Spadina	Stephen LaFrenie		M					
Vaughan	Adrian Visentin		M					
Welland	Jennifer Mooradian		F					
Wellington—Halton Hills	Brent Bouteiller		M					
Whitby—Oshawa	Doug Anderson		M					
Willowdale	Lou Carcasole		M					
Windsor—Tecumseh	Kyle Prestanski		M					
Windsor West	John Esposito		M					
York Centre	Rosemary Frei		F					
York—Simcoe	John Dewar		M					
York South—Weston	Andre Papadimitriou		M					
York West	Nick Capra		M					

== Manitoba - 14 seats ==
Riding	Candidate	Notes	Gender	Residence	Occupation	Votes	%	Rank
Brandon—Souris	Dave Barnes		M			5,408	15.78	3rd
Charleswood—St. James—Assiniboia	Brian Timlick		M			2,614	6.56	4th
Churchill	Saara Harvie		F			606	3.29	4th
Dauphin—Swan River—Marquette	Kate Storey		F			1,916	6.51	4th
Elmwood—Transcona	Christopher Hrynkow		M		PhD student in the Peace and Conflict Studies program at the University of Manitoba.	1,839	5.86	4th
Kildonan—St. Paul	Kevan Bowkett		M			1,679	4.60	4th
Portage—Lisgar	Charlie Howatt		M			2,606	8.07	3rd
Provencher	Janine Gibson		F			2,149	5.79	4th
Saint Boniface	Marc Payette		M			2,104	5.0	4th
Selkirk—Interlake	Glenda Whiteman		F			2,126	5.5	4th
Winnipeg Centre	Jessie Klassen					2,798	11.06	4th
Winnipeg North	Catherine Johannson		F			1,077	4.8	4th
Winnipeg South	David Cosby		M			1,936	4.50	4th
Winnipeg South Centre	Vere Scott					2,865	7.35	4th

== Saskatchewan - 14 seats ==
Riding	Candidate	Notes	Gender	Residence	Occupation	Votes	%	Rank
Battlefords—Lloydminster	Norbert Kratchmer		M			1,287	5.0	4th
Blackstrap	Imre Pallagi		M			2,325	6.0	4th
Cypress Hills—Grasslands	Bill Clary		M			1,919	6.6	4th
Desnethé—Missinippi—Churchill River	George Morin		M			735	3.82	4th
Palliser	Larissa Shasko		F			1,580	5.18	4th
Prince Albert	Amanda Smytaniuk		F			1,413	4.9	4th
Regina—Lumsden—Lake Centre	Nicolas Stulberg		M			1,737	5.5	4th
Regina—Qu'Appelle	Greg Chatterson		M			1,556	5.8	4th
Saskatoon—Humboldt	Jean-Pierre Ducasse		M			2,211	6.4	4th
Saskatoon—Rosetown—Biggar	Amber Jones		F			1,228	4.57	3rd
Saskatoon—Wanuskewin	Tobi-Dawne Smith		F			2,182	6.73	4th
Souris—Moose Mountain	Bob Deptuck		M			1,643	6.0	4th
Wascana	George Wooldridge		M			1,706	4.6	4th
Yorkton—Melville	Jen Antony		F			1,664	5.7	3rd

== Alberta - 28 seats ==
Riding	Candidate	Notes	Gender	Residence	Occupation	Votes	%	Rank
Calgary Centre	Natalie Odd		F					
Calgary Centre-North	Eric Donovan		M					
Calgary East	Nathan Coates		M					
Calgary Northeast	Abeed Monty Ahmad		M					
Calgary—Nose Hill	Tony Hajj		M					
Calgary Southeast	Margaret Chandler		F					
Calgary Southwest	Kelly Christie		F					
Calgary West	Randy Weeks		M					
Crowfoot	Kaity Kettenbach		F					
Edmonton Centre	David J. Parker		M					
Edmonton East	Trey Capnerhurst		M					
Edmonton—Leduc	Valerie Kennedy		F					
Edmonton—Mill Woods—Beaumont	David Allan Hrushka		M					
Edmonton—St. Albert	Peter Johnston		M					
Edmonton—Sherwood Park	Nina Erfani		F					
Edmonton—Spruce Grove	Wendy Walker		F					
Edmonton—Strathcona	Jane Thrall		F					
Fort McMurray—Athabasca	Dylan Richards		M					
Lethbridge	Amanda Swagar		F					
Macleod	Jared McCollum		M					
Medicine Hat	Kevin Dodd		M					
Peace River	Jennifer Villebrun		F					
Red Deer	Evan Bedford		M					
Vegreville—Wainwright	Will Munsey		M					
Westlock—St. Paul	Aden Murphy		M					
Wetaskiwin	Les Parsons		M					
Wild Rose	Lisa Fox		F					
Yellowhead	Monika Schaefer		F					

== British Columbia - 36 seats ==
Riding	Candidate	Notes	Gender	Residence	Occupation	Votes	%	Rank
Abbotsford	Karen Durant		F					
British Columbia Southern Interior	Andy Morel		M					
Burnaby—Douglas	Doug Perry		M					
Burnaby—New Westminster	Carrie–Ann McLaren		F					
Cariboo—Prince George	Amber Van Drielen		F					
Chilliwack—Fraser Canyon	Barbara LeBeau		F					
Delta—Richmond East	Matt Laine		M					
Esquimalt—Juan de Fuca	Brian Gordon		M					
Fleetwood—Port Kells	Brian Newbold		M					
Kamloops—Thompson—Cariboo	Donovan Cavers		M					
Kelowna—Lake Country	Angela Reid		F					
Kootenay—Columbia	Ralph Moore		M					
Langley	Patrick Meyer		M					
Nanaimo—Alberni	John Fryer		M					
Nanaimo—Cowichan	Christina Knighton		F					
Newton—North Delta	Liz Walker		F					
New Westminster—Coquitlam	Marshall Smith		M					
North Vancouver	Jim Stephenson		M					
Okanagan—Coquihalla	Dan Bouchard		M					
Okanagan—Shuswap	Huguette Allen		F					
Pitt Meadows—Maple Ridge—Mission	Mike Gildersleeve		M					
Port Moody—Westwood—Port Coquitlam	Rod Brindamour		M					
Prince George—Peace River	Hilary Crowley		F					
Richmond	Michael Wolfe		M					
Saanich—Gulf Islands	Andrew Lewis		M					
Skeena—Bulkley Valley	Hondo Arendt		M					
South Surrey—White Rock—Cloverdale	David Blair		M					
Surrey North	Dan Kashamanga		M					
Vancouver Centre	Adriane Carr		F					
Vancouver East	Mike Carr		M					
Vancouver Island North	Philip Stone		M					
Vancouver Kingsway	Doug Warkentin		M					
Vancouver Quadra	Daniel Grice		M					
Vancouver South	Csaba Gulyas		M					
Victoria	Adam Saab		M					
West Vancouver—Sunshine Coast—Sea to Sky Country	Blair Wilson		M					

== Yukon - 1 seat ==
Riding	Candidate	Notes	Gender	Residence	Occupation	Votes	%	Rank
Yukon	John Streicker		M			1,880	12.83	3rd

== Northwest Territories - 1 seat ==
Riding	Candidate	Notes	Gender	Residence	Occupation	Votes	%	Rank
Western Arctic	Sam Gamble		M			752	5.49	4th

== Nunavut - 1 seat ==
Riding	Candidate	Notes	Gender	Residence	Occupation	Votes	%	Rank
Nunavut	Peter Ittinuar	Former NDP and Liberal MP for Nunatsiaq.	M	Iqaluit		675	8.37	4th

== See also ==
- Results of the Canadian federal election, 2008
- Results by riding for the Canadian federal election, 2008

Election	Division	Party	Votes	%	Place	Winner
2000 Bromont by-election	Councillor, Ward Two	n/a	elected		1/?	himself
2002 Bromont municipal	Councillor, Ward Two	n/a	205	37.68	2/2	Patrick Charbonneau
2005 Bromont municipal	Councillor, Ward Four	n/a	210	33.07	2/2	Paul Rolland
2008 federal	Brome—Missisquoi	Green	1,784	3.58	5/6	Christian Ouellet, Bloc Québécois
2009 Bromont municipal	Councillor, Ward Four	n/a	64	9.55	4/4	Marie-Ève Lagacé

Election	Division	Party	Votes	%	Place	Winner
federal by-election, 13 February 1995	Brome—Missisquoi	Natural Law	77	0.21	9/10	Denis Paradis, Liberal
2006 federal	Brome—Missisquoi	Green	1,721	3.55	6/6	Christian Ouellet, Bloc Québécois
2008 federal	Shefford	Green	1,848	3.66	5/5	Robert Vincent, Bloc Québécois
2009 Bromont municipal	Council, Ward Six	n/a	57	13.38	3/3	Anie Perrault

Electoral record
Election	Division	Party	Votes	%	Place	Winner
1997 federal	Parry Sound-Muskoka	Green	513	1.20	5/7	Andy Mitchell, Liberal
2003 provincial	Parry Sound—Muskoka	Green	2,277	5.88	4/5	Norm Miller, Progressive Conservative
2004 federal	Parry Sound-Muskoka	Green	3,524	8.02	4/4	Andy Mitchell, Liberal
2006 federal	Parry Sound-Muskoka	Green	3,701	8.02	4/4	Tony Clement, Conservative
2008 federal	Parry Sound-Muskoka	Green	5,119	11.77	4/5	Tony Clement, Conservative
