= Carol Lee Sanchez =

American poet

Carol Lee Sanchez (born 1934–2014) was a Native American poet, visual artist, essayist, and teacher.

== Biography ==
Carol Lee Sanchez was born in Albuquerque, New Mexico. She describes her cultural heritage as Lebanese-American and Laguna Pueblo. She received her Bachelor of Arts degree in Art Administration from San Francisco State University in 1978.

== Career ==
From 1976 to 1985, she was a member of the San Francisco State University faculty. After a brief stay in Central California (1986–89) she relocated to Central Missouri and has taught at the University of Missouri, State Fair Community College, Sedalia, Missouri and Whiteman Air Force Base, Knob Noster, Missouri.

=== Poet and lecturer ===
As a poet and lecturer, Sanchez was invited by the Art America Division of the United States Information Agency (USIA) to speak on Native American culture held in Germany and Latvia (Fall 1993). She has appeared on the PBS Television network reading her poetry. A past executive director of the California Poets in the Schools program (1976–78), she received her training and appointment as a Master Poetry Teacher while serving as Bay Area coordinator of the program (1974–76). Sanchez continues to conduct poetry workshops in the schools.

=== Artist ===
As a visual artist, her "Works in Canvas" and other paintings have been exhibited in Northern and Southern California and in the Northwest states of Oregon, Washington and Montana. Her works have been shown at the University of California Santa Barbara Women's Center and UC Riverside American Indian Center in 1988 and 1989. Prior to their move to central Missouri, Sanchez and her husband (Thomas Allen) owned and operated Ha pa nyi Fine Arts, an American Indian Art Gallery in Santa Barbara, California (1987–89). Sanchez selected the artists represented by the gallery, curated individual and group shows & coordinated the gallery's guest speakers on "Contemporary Issues for American Indians in the United States". Her drawings, paintings & mixed media works are in private collections throughout the US and Europe.

=== Activist ===
As a multicultural consultant/community activist best describes the way Sanchez has worked with such diverse community organizations as Ha pa nyi Fine Arts Gallery, Santa Barbara Arts Council, California Confederation for the Arts, Santa Barbara County Arts Commission, California Poets in the Schools, Artist's Equity of Northern CA, All Indian Nations Arts, Bay Area Video Coalition and Galeria de la Raza.

=== Educator ===
As an educator, Sanchez served on the Faculty of San Francisco State University, where she taught courses in the American Studies, Ethnic Studies & Women's Studies Programs (1976–85); she was appointed Acting Chairperson of American Indian Studies (1979–80) and served in other academic and student services positions. She has taught courses in American Indian Studies at the San Francisco Art Institute (1978–80), Mills College in Oakland, CA (1981), and courses in Women Studies at CSU Northridge in Northridge, CA (1989), and the University of Missouri in Columbia, Missouri (1993). She has also served as Writer in Residence at Stephens College for Women in Columbia, Missouri, during the Fall Semester of 1998. Her teaching in Pettis County includes extended education mini-courses on American Indian Cultures and Customs (at State Fair Community College) and Poetry Workshops through the Boonslick Regional Library in Sedalia.

== Honors ==
Sanchez has served on many Arts Panels and Boards, such as Panelist for the Exemplary Arts Program of the California Arts Council and the California State Board of Education (1984); Literature Grants Panelist for the Michigan Council on the Arts (1987); Panelist for Artists in Communities (1985–86) and Artists in Schools Grants Panels (1988–89) of the California Arts Council; 2nd District Commissioner for the Santa Barbara County Arts Commission (1987–89); Task Force Planning Committee for the Sedalia Arts Council in Sedalia, Missouri (1993–94).

In 1998, she was given the Writer of the Year Award for Poetry by the members of the Wordcraft Circle of Native Authors and Storytellers.

== Selected works ==
=== Writing available online ===
- above and beyond
- For the cloud people
- Tribal Chant
- san francisco & fox tales-1
- Her Song (for SHE WHO THOUGHT US INTO BEING)
- The Old Ones Beloit Poetry Journal- American Indian chapbook [PDF]

=== Books ===
- Rainbow Visions & Earth Ways, O.B.E.M.A. Multicultural Series, Universitätsverlag Rasch, Osnabrück, 1998.
- From Spirit to Matter: new and selected poems, 1969–1996, Taurean Horn Press.
- She poems, Chicory Blue Press.
- Excerpts from a mountain climber's handbook: selected poems, 1971–1984, Taurean Horn Press.
- Message Bringer Woman, Taurean Horn Press.
- Time Warps, Taurean Horn Press.
- Conversations from the Nightmare, Casa Editorial.

=== Anthologies ===
- "The Performing Poet As An Almost Storyteller" in Reclaiming The Vision – Past, Present and Future: Native Voices for the Eighth Generation, edited with James Bruchac, Greenfield Review Press.
- Joy Harjo and Gloria Bird (editors), Reinventing the Enemy's Language: Contemporary Native Women's Writing of North America, W.W. Norton.
- "Animal, Vegetable, & Mineral: The Sacred Connection" in Carol J. Adams (editor), Ecofeminism and the sacred, Harvard University Press.

=== Chapters in other books ===
- Gatherings, The En'owkin Journal of First North American Peoples A Retrospective of the First Decade, Volume 10, Theytus Books.
- Returning the Gift: Poetry and Prose from the First North American Native Writers' Festival (Sun Tracks Books, No. 29), University of Arizona Press.
- Gatherings, The En'owkin Journal of First North American Peoples Beyond Victimization: Forging a Path to Celebration, Volume 9, Theytus Books.
- Callaloo: Native Literatures Special Issue, 17, 1994, Johns Hopkins University Press.
- Joseph Bruchac and Dian Landau (editors), Singing of Earth, Walking Stick Press & The Nature Company.
- "Creating Urban Tribal Communities" in Judith Plaskow and Carol Christ (editors), Weaving the Visions: New Patterns in Women's Spirituality, Harper & Row.
- "Sex, Class and Race Intersections/Visions of Women of Color" in Beth Brant (editor), A Gathering of Spirit: A Collection by North American Indian Women, Firebrand Books.
- Janine Canan (editor), She Rises Like the Sun: Invocations of the Goddess, Crossing Press.
- Rayna Green (editor), That's What She Said: Contemporary Poetry and Fiction by Native American Women, Indiana University Press.
- Bo Scholer (editor), Coyote Was Here: essays on contemporary Native American literary and political mobilization, The Dolphin No. 9, University of Aarhus, Denmark.
- James Koller, Steve Nemirow, Caroll Arnett, and Peter Blue Cloud (editors), Coyote's Journal, Wingbow Press, 1982
- Gogisgi/Caroll Arnett (editor), The Beloit Poetry Journal: American Indian Chapbook, Winter 1979.
- The Remembered Earth: An Anthology of Contemporary Native American Literature, Geary Hobson (editor), University of New Mexico Press
- Carol A. Simone (editor), Networks: An Anthology of Bay Area Women Poets, Vortex Editions.
- Ishmael Reed & Al Young (editors), Y'Bird, Yardbird Press, Vol 1 No 1. 1977–78.
