= Arts Council of Mendocino County =

The Arts Council of Mendocino County (ACMC) is the Mendocino County, California arts council serving the arts in the Mendocino area. This council is under the California state arts council the California Arts Council.

The Mendocino Ballet is connected with this organization, funding it in part with ticket sales. It awards grants through its Get Arts in the Schools Program to bring artists, musicians, and other creative professionals into local schools.

The Arts Council of Mendocino County runs under the California state arts council, the California Arts Council (CAC).

== Executive Staff ==
- Alyssum Wier - Executive Director, Since 2010
- Hal Wagenet - President
- Trudy McCreanor - Vice-President
