= Mainly Mozart Festival =

Mainly Mozart is a 501(c)(3) non-profit based in San Diego, California. Mainly Mozart was created in 1988 by Maestro David Atherton and Executive Director Nancy Laturno, formerly of the San Diego Symphony, to give the people of Southern California and Baja California an opportunity to experience classical music performed live in the summer by principal orchestral musicians.

The focus was placed on Mozart because he is considered by many to be the greatest composer of all time and because of the variety of his musical genius. Since its inception, Mainly Mozart has added the works of other composers with an emphasis on those of the 18th and 19th centuries. Using the common language of music, Mainly Mozart has served as a regional resource by connecting communities in Southern California and Baja California to Mainly Mozart musicians, classical music, and stories behind the music.

== Presentations ==
=== Concerts ===
The first Mainly Mozart Festival in June 1989 – a series of nine concerts—was performed on the outdoor stage of the Old Globe Theatre in Balboa Park. Over the ensuing years, Mainly Mozart has increased its overall annual concert performances staged at various venues. In June 2008, and just in time for the 20th anniversary of the Mainly Mozart Festival, Mainly Mozart will become the primary tenant of the restored 83-year-old, 1,300-seat Balboa Theatre in downtown San Diego. A $26-million renovation of the “jewel box” theatre has maintained its blend of Mediterranean, Moorish and Spanish Revival architectural styles. Since 1992, the Balboa Theatre has been on the National Register of Historic Places. San Diego’s Centre City Development Corporation funded the restoration.

=== Spotlight Series ===
In 1996, Mainly Mozart began producing the Spotlight Series featuring chamber music concerts during the winter and spring. The principal home of the series is Scripps Research in La Jolla, but facilities in the north San Diego County coastal community of Carlsbad, and the inland community of Rancho Santa Fe are also used.

=== Bi-national and educational outreach ===
In 1992 the Mainly Mozart Orchestra was invited to participate in the first Festival Internacional de Mozart in Baja California (now Mozart Binacional). This was also the year that Mainly Mozart established an educational component to bring music to students in low income or at risk neighborhoods in both San Diego County and Baja California. These programs are continually expanding and now reach over 60,000 students in both countries.

The lives and music of Wolfgang Amadeus Mozart and Ludwig van Beethoven are brought to school children through the Living Composers Series. These informative and entertaining half-hour assemblies engage students in interactive mini-plays set to the music of these master composers. Question and answer session rounds out the teaching session, and in-school materials are provided for both the pre- and post- performance educational activities.

Mainly Mozart also has been working to enrich the lives of economically disadvantaged families in Southeast San Diego through a partnership with the Jackie Robinson Family YMCA. Mainly Mozart's free ticket program has allowed hundreds of children to enjoy their very first concert experience at Jacobs Music Center (home of the San Diego Symphony). In another outreach program, Mainly Mozart offers high school and college music students discounted concert tickets.

== Other endeavors ==
=== The Amadeus Suite ===
Mainly Mozart commissioned “The Amadeus Suite” in 1999. It was created by British jazz trumpeter Guy Barker, who based his composition on characters from Mozart operas. In 2006, the suite was expanded by Barker and was performed in San Diego during the Mainly Mozart-led year-long San Diego County-wide celebration of Mozart's 250th birthday (January 27, 1756). The celebration was coordinated with cultural officials in Austria.

=== Club Amadeus ===
To show its appreciation of its patron/donors, Mainly Mozart has presented a smaller, more intimate concert series known as Club Amadeus. The supporters hear chamber music in elegant private residences and other special venues throughout San Diego. Other annual funding for Mainly Mozart is provided, in part, by the City of San Diego Commission for Arts and Culture; the County of San Diego Community Enhancement program; the California Arts Council; the National Endowment for the Arts; and contributions from local businesses and foundations.
