= CCMC =

CCMC may refer to:

- Cataract-microcornea syndrome
- Cebu City Medical Center
- Central Crisis Management Cell, a secret security committee formed by the Syrian government to coordinate a crackdown on revolt during the Syrian civil war
- Coimbatore City Municipal Corporation
- Comité des Constructeurs du Marché Commun (1972-1991), automobile industry group, the predecessor of European Automobile Manufacturers Association
- Committee on the Costs of Medical Care, an early advocacy group for national health insurance in the United States of America
- Communications Consortium Media Center
- Communist Chinese military companies
- Community Coordinated Modeling Center
- Connecticut Children's Medical Center
- Cultural Council for Monterey County
- CCMC (band), a Canadian free improvisation group
- CEN-CENELEC Management Centre
