= Brendan Hughes (disambiguation) =

Brendan Hughes (1948–2008) was an Irish republican.

Brendan Hughes may also refer to:

- Brendan Patrick Hughes (director, podcaster), American director and podcast host
- Brendan Hughes (EastEnders), character from EastEnders
- Brendan Hughes (politician), Canadian politician
