= Arts Orange County =

Arts council in California, USA

Coordinates: 33.69751°N 117.91416°W

The Arts Orange County (AOC) is the official Orange County, California, USA arts council. It runs under the California state arts council, the California Arts Council (CAC). As of 2017, the organization's headquarters are in Irvine, California and the President is Richard Stein.

== Programs ==
=== Arts Education ===
Arts Orange County provides leadership for increasing the quality of arts education in the county's K-12 schools, functioning at the unique intersection point between the county's professional artists, arts organizations and schools.

=== Arts OC Workshops & Conferences ===
Workshops, conferences, and personalized training to help build professional skills of those working in the nonprofit arts community. Technical assistance and resources offered by other organizations in the county and beyond are available in the Making Connections section of this website.

=== Grants Program ===
Supporting the development and strengthening of the county's arts organizations, individual artists and arts education by offering strategic financial assistance.

=== Imagination Celebration ===
The annual spring festival of arts for children, teenagers, and families.

=== Orange County Arts Awards ===
This annual event celebrates progress and achievements in the cultural life of Orange County and the people who make them happen.
