= Arts Council of Placer County =

Coordinates: 38.90104°N 121.06818°W

The Arts Council of Placer County (PlacerArts) is the official Placer County, California, USA arts council.

The Arts Council of Placer County (PlacerArts) was established in 1983 as a not-for-profit agency. As the catalyst for the arts and humanities in Placer County, the Council encourages excellence and expansion of visual, musical, theatrical, literary, media, and dance art endeavors. The Council serves as a clearinghouse for information on the arts in Placer County and also publishes a bimonthly arts magazine Perspectives. Its purpose is to create a forum for communication for artists and art organizations in Placer County and to increase awareness of activities and programs related to arts and culture in the area.

The Arts Council of Placer County runs under the California state arts council, the California Arts Council (CAC).

== Programs ==
=== Regranting ===
PlacerArts has successfully managed a Regrant Program since 1988. This competitive process is an equitable means to identify, encourage and reward artists, art agencies and art initiatives, thereby improving both the quality and accessibility of art programs throughout Placer County.

=== Technical Assistance ===
PlacerArts provides ongoing technical assistance to Placer County's established and emerging artists, local art agencies, and art groups. PlacerArts is part of several event and initiative committees in the county and has been instrumental in fostering three community concert series, six art festivals, one national arts exhibition, three major multicultural celebrations and three art education programs.

=== Touring / Presenting ===
PlacerArts presents professional performing arts and community theatrical performances in varying venues. Additionally, through its popular stART program, PlacerArts sponsors presentations in more than 30 schools.

=== Galleries / Exhibitions ===
The Autumn Art Studios Tour is taking place Autumn 2004 featuring several artists throughout Western Placer County. Auburn Art Walk, whereby over 30 local businesses open their storefront wall or window spaces to area artists for a six-week period, has increased local awareness and business support of PlacerArts programs.

=== Art in Public Places Programs ===
PlacerArts was instrumental in convincing the City of Auburn to pass a Public Art Ordinance and in establishing the Auburn Arts Commission to manage future Public Art projects in the county seat. Placer County's Public Art policy is under development at this time. New public installations have been dedicated in Granite Bay, Roseville, Newcastle and Lincoln with PlacerArts assistance.

=== Arts in Education ===
Artist-in-school residencies are provided through PlacerArts's stART Program and matching funds pool. Initiated in 1991 through a PlacerArts Regrant, the pilot was developed by local city partner Lincoln Arts, and since 1995 administered by PlacerArts. In cooperation with the Office of Education, PlacerArts serves foster children and other youths at risk via Kaleidoscope Program for After School Arts and School/Community Violence Prevention Program.

=== Information Services ===
Perspectives, a comprehensive bimonthly newsletter, regularly features county calendar of art events, reviews, calls for entries, current information, interviews, guest articles, and related ads. Perspectives is distributed by mail to PlacerArts members and targeted area residents as well as in person, to the public, via visitor centers, art centers, chambers, bookstores, coffee houses, schools, and libraries around the county.

=== Fairs / Festivals ===
PlacerArts presents two festivals: AGROart Festival, each October, at historic Griffith Quarry Park in Penryn featuring the quirky AGROart sculpture competition where only fruits and vegetables may be used. One Root Festival takes place in September in downtown Roseville and celebrates cultural diversity through food, art and music.

=== Conferences ===
Annually, PlacerArts provides a grant writing workshop for prospective Regrant applicants. In cooperation with the Sacramento Metropolitan Arts Partnership, a workspace giving workshop provides an opportunity for state employees to contribute to PlacerArts. As co-chair for CALAA Region 3, PlacerArts planned together with co-chair Yuba-Sutter Regional Arts Council for the 1997 CALAA regional meeting and technical assistance workshops.
