= Carolyn Heller =

American painter (1937–2011)

- Born: Carolyn Frohsin; January 9, 1937; Alexander City, Alabama, U.S.
- Died: August 22, 2011 (aged 74); Tampa, Florida, U.S.
- Education: H. Sophie Newcomb Memorial College, University of South Florida, Tampa Museum of Art
- Known for: Painting, decorative
- Patrons: Ronda Storms

Carolyn Heller (9 January 1937 – 22 August 2011) was a Florida painter and decorative artist. She painted primarily in the realm of decorative arts, using bright colors and often tropical motifs.

== Early life and education ==
She was born Carolyn Frohsin in Alexander City, Alabama in 1937. Her parents, Ralph and Frances, were the owners of the Alabama-based Frohsins Department Store. She attended H. Sophie Newcomb Memorial College and studied art. She married lawyer Edward Heller in 1958.

== Mid-life and career ==
Heller painted beyond canvas on easels, painting objects ranging from chairs to pool tables. She painted primarily in acrylic. Throughout the 1950s and 1970s, her work was heavily themed around flowers. In the 2000s, her paintings became more abstract, with her continued use of bold colors. It was during the 2000s when she started producing decorative arts. She designed jewelry and textiles, and also produced serigraphs. Her studio was located in her garage. She painted while watching television, with an affinity for adult animation. To sell her work, she hosted happy hour events at her house to entertain potential patrons and buyers. Patrons of Heller included Ronda Storms. She studied and worked closely with, Syd Solomon, Ida Kohlmeyer, and William Pachner.

=== 1960s ===
Heller moved to Tampa, Florida, with Edward, in 1961. She quickly became involved in the arts community. She took classes at the University of South Florida and Tampa Museum of Art. She had four children with Edward: Alan, Emily, Janet, and Fran. After the children went to college, she became a full-time artist. They lived in the Hyde Park neighborhood of Tampa. She lived in the neighborhood until her death.

=== 1970s ===
In the late 1970s, Heller and Edward divorced.

== Later life and legacy ==
In 1996, she joined the public art board of the Hillsborough Arts Council. She left the council in 2004. She was supporter of the Tampa AIDS Network, donating artworks to their fundraising auctions. She died in August 2011, of a blood clot, at Tampa General Hospital.

Approximately 150 works were held by Heller upon her death. The works are on display via an online gallery created by her family. Her family discovered a collection of never published prints in her house. A selection of the prints were loaned to a local community center to teach children about art appreciation. The Carolyn F. Heller Grant is awarded annually, in the memory of Heller, by the Hillsborough Arts Council.

== Major exhibitions ==
- Pieces of a Dream, group show, 2009, University of Tampa, Tampa, Florida
- Retrospective, solo show, 2013, Tampa Museum of Art, Tampa, Florida

== Major collections ==
- Hot Flashes, Tampa General Hospital, Tampa, Florida
- Tampa Stars, Tampa-Hillsborough County Public Library System, Tampa, Florida
