= Eliot Fintushel =

American novelist

Eliot S. Fintushel
- Born: March 13, 1948 (age 78); Rochester, New York, U.S.
- Occupations: Actor; educator; author
- Writing career
- Genre: speculative fiction

Eliot S. Fintushel (born March 13, 1948) is an American actor, educator and speculative fiction writer. He writes as Eliot Fintushel.

== Biography ==
Fintushel is a baker's son, born in Rochester, New York. At nine he is reported to have "grinned down" a cougar terrorizing upstate New York and delivered it to the Monroe County Zoo, where it afterwards killed two zookeepers and a county sheriff before being put down by a tranquilizer gun.

He studied Zen at the Rochester Zen Center with Philip Kapleau and Toni Packer.

Fintushel currently makes his living as a writer and as an itinerant solo performer, fiction writer, and college teacher as an adjunct theater professor at Santa Rosa Junior College. He lives between the horse stables and transmission shops behind the Sonoma County Fairgrounds in Santa Rosa, California.

== Theatrical career ==
Fintushel began his professional acting career at thirty at a mime theater in upstate New York. He has performed original solo shows at thousands of theaters, community centers, libraries, schools, and other venues, as well as various international festivals, including the National Theater, the Wolftrap International Children's Festival, and the International Clown and Mime Festival.

Once, for a party of UN diplomats, he performed under the anti-aircraft gun of a German training ship in New York Harbor, putting a clown nose on then German consul Jetta Grutzner. In 2006 his Faces of Sonoma County project, funded by the Sonoma County Cultural Arts Council, found him casting faces on street corners.

== Literary career ==
Fintushel has been active as a science fiction author since 1993. Harlan Ellison has been quoted as saying "Eliot Fintushel and his nifty stories have been an ongoing joy for me for years."

Fintushel has had numerous short stories published, most in Asimov's Science Fiction, with others appearing in Analog, Strange Horizons, Amazing Stories, Lady Churchill’s Rosebud Wristlet, and Crank!

His work has also appeared in various anthologies, including Jewish Sci-Fi Stories for Kids, Jewish Detective Stories for Kids, Nalo Hopkinson's Mojo: Conjure Stories, Polyphony 4, and several times in the annual anthology The Year’s Best Science Fiction.

His novel Breakfast with the Ones You Love is available from Random House.

== Recognition ==
As a performer, Fintushel has received the US National Endowment for the Arts' Fellowship for Solo Performance Artists twice, as well as grants for creating and touring shows from arts councils and foundations on both east and west coasts.

As a writer, he has had stories nominated for the Nebula and Theodore Sturgeon Awards. "Izzy and the Father of Terror" was nominated for the 1999 Nebula Award for Best Novella, placed sixth in the 1998 Asimov's Readers' Poll for Best Novella and eighteenth in the 1998 Locus Poll Award for Best Novella. "Crane Fly" was a finalist for the 1999 Theodore Sturgeon Award. "Milo and Sylvie" was a finalist for the 2001 Theodore Sturgeon Award. "Female Action" placed ninth in the 2002 Asimov's Readers' Poll for Best Novella. Breakfast with the Ones You Love placed eighth in the 2008 Locus Poll Award for Best First Novel.

== Bibliography ==
=== Novels ===
- Breakfast with the Ones You Love (2007)

=== Short fiction ===
- "Herbrand's Conjecture and the White Sox Scandal" (1993)
- "Ylem" (1994)
- "A Ram in the Thicket" (1994)
- "Hamisch in Avalon" (1995)
- "Noses" (1995)
- "Old Man" (1995)
- "The Beast with Two Backs" (1995)
- "Fillet of Man" (1995)
- "Dikduk" (1995)
- "Santacide" (1996)
- "Popeye and Pops Watch the Evening World Report" (1996)
- "Izzy at the Lucky Three" (1996)
- "Shell Game" (1996)
- "Sir Blamor in Dieu Et Mon Droit!" (1997)
- "Izzy and the Father of Terror" (1997)
- "Conejo Por Lunchay" (1998)
- "Crane Fly" (1998)
- "Galactic Business" (1998)
- "Izzy and the Hypocrite Lecteur" (1998)
- "Auschwitz and the Rectification of History" (1998)
- "Honey Baby and Mademan" (1999)
- "Malocchio" (1999)
- "De Rerum" (1999)
- "Iz and the Blue God" (1999)
- "We from Afar" (1999)
- "Open Mike" (1999)
- "Milo and Sylvie" (2000)
- "Going Private" (2001)
- "Female Action" (2001)
- "Drought" (2001)
- "Chronic Zygotic Dermis Disorder" (2003)
- "The Grass and the Trees" (2003)
- "White Man's Trick" (2003)
- "Kukla Boogie Moon" (2003)
- "Women Are Ugly" (2004)
- "Gwendolyn Is Happy to Serve You" (2004)
- "The Eye" (2004)
- "Bone Women" (2005)
- "My Termen" (2006)
- "How the Little Rabbi Grew" (2007)
- "Last Drink Bird Head" (2009)
- "No, Really" (2011)
- "Harry Truman in Hell" (2012)
- "Zen City" (2016)
- "In Boonker's Room" (2016)
- "Chubba Luna" (2017)
- "Zen" (2018)

=== Verse ===
- "Sonnet on First Learning the Definitive Role of Neurotransmitters in the Determination of Human Emotions" (1998)
- "Icommensurable" (2016)

=== Nonfiction ===
- "Bubby Sophie's Glass Tea" (1996)
- "Notes on Science Fiction, Fantasy, and the Lazzo of Stage Reality" (1997)
- "Letter (NYRSF, May 1997) (1997)
- "Letter (NYRSF, March 1998) (1998)
- "Vissi D'Arte (I've Had It with Art)" (1999)
- "Introduction to Afternoon at Schrafft's" (2001)

New Afterward to "Looking Backward" by Edward Bellamy, 2000 Signet Classics edition
