= Madera County Arts Council =

The Madera County Arts Council is the official Madera County, California, USA arts council.

A partner in the state-local partnership of the California Arts Council since 1982.

A private, non-profit organization working to support and promote all arts in Madera County.

Blends the expertise from many partnerships and twenty-one directors to create the necessary link between the arts and community development.

The Madera County Arts Council runs under the California state arts council, the California Arts Council (CAC).

== Programs ==
=== Circle Gallery ===
A non-profit Gallery showcasing and promoting the juried work of the area’s professional artists.

=== Scholarship and grant program ===
Serving graduating high school seniors and county arts groups.
