= Arlington Hotel (Narrowsburg, New York) =

- U.S. National Register of Historic Places
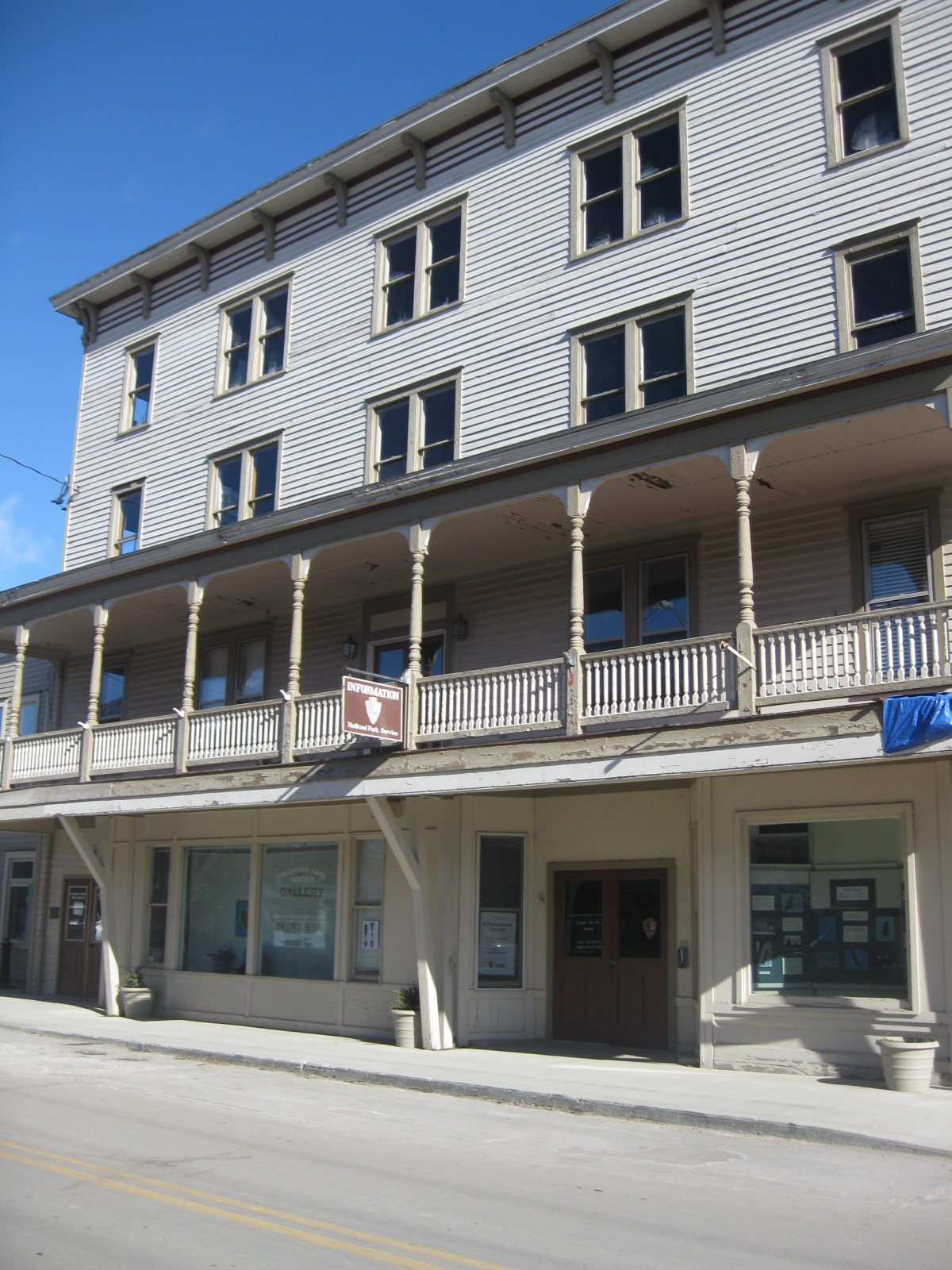
- Arlington Hotel, February 2010

- Location within New York Location within the United States
- Location: Main St., Narrowsburg, New York
- Coordinates: 41°36′30″N 75°3′40″W
- Area: 0.2 acres (0.081 ha)
- Built: 1894
- NRHP reference No.: 83001806
- Added to NRHP: March 31, 1983

Arlington Hotel is a historic hotel located at Narrowsburg in Sullivan County, New York. It was added to the National Register of Historic Places on March 31, 1983.

== History and features ==
The Arlington Hotel was built in 1894. It was initially operated by J.G. Gutheil.

During the 1890s, the hotel accommodated adventurers and explorers including J. Wallace Hoff of Delaware who later spoke highly of the hospitality and attractive waitresses.

During the 1920s, businessman George Oellrich bought the hotel for use as a general store.

The hotel is a four-story frame structure, five bays wide and three bays deep. The upper three stories are covered in clapboard and the first floor in modern wood siding and permastone. It features a second story porch that spans the south facade.

== Delaware Valley Arts Alliance ==
The building now serves as the Delaware Valley Arts Alliance. The DVAA offers two art galleries, a gift shop, performing arts and cultural programs, in addition to serving as the Arts Council for Sullivan County and providing grant funds for arts nonprofits and individual artists.
