= Mariposa County Arts Council =

The Mariposa County Arts Council is the official Mariposa County, California, USA arts council.

Established in 1981, it runs under the California state arts council, the California Arts Council (CAC).

On May 17, 2012, the council gallery, office, and records were destroyed in a fire that started in the kitchen of a pizza restaurant in another part of the building.

For 30 years, the council's signature event was its annual Mariposa Storytelling Festival. The festival came to an end in 2017 because of rising production costs and falling sponsorship.
