= Ventura County Arts Council =

The Ventura County Arts Council is the official arts council for Ventura County, located in Southern California.

It was founded in 1996, and incorporated as a 501(c)(3) public-benefit corporation in 1997.

== Function ==
The Ventura County Arts Council is the official local partner of the California Arts Council. It has strategic partnerships with the California Department of Education, the Ventura County Superintendent of Schools, and the Ventura County Board of Supervisors.

== See also ==
- Art in the Greater Los Angeles Area
- Museums in Ventura County, California
