= Gibson Mansion =

Historic house in California, United States

- William B. Gibson House
- U.S. National Register of Historic Places
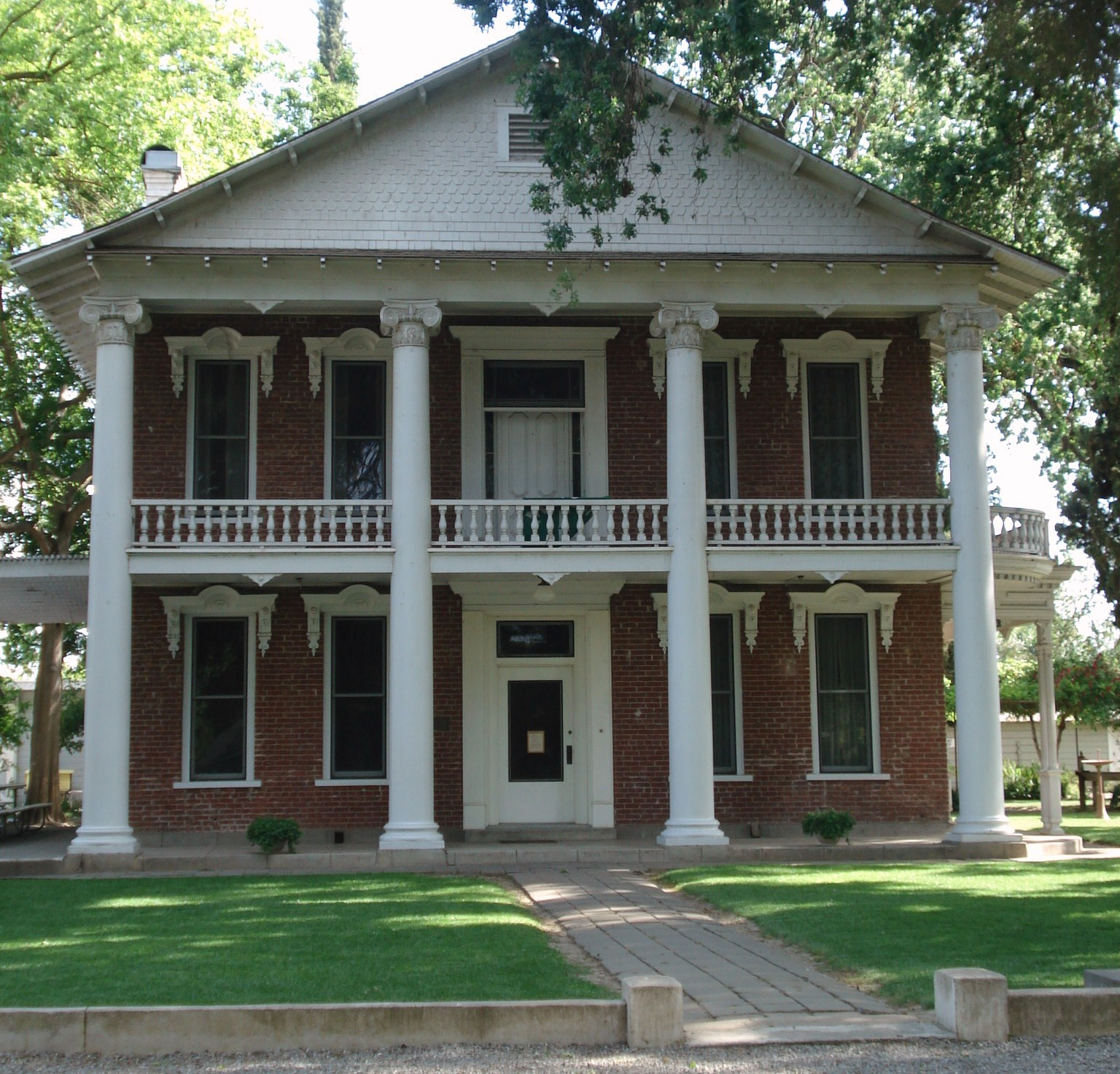

- Location within California Location within the United States
- Location: 512 Gibson Road; Woodland, California
- Coordinates: 38°39′44.42″N 121°46′24.77″W
- Built: 1857; 169 years ago
- Architectural style: Mixed (more than 2 styles from different periods)
- NRHP reference No.: 76000542
- Added to NRHP: November 7, 1976

The Gibson House (also known as the Yolo County Historical Collection, YCHC, the Gibson Mansion, or the Gibson Museum) is a historic house that now serves as a museum in Woodland, California. It exemplifies several architectural styles, including Georgian Revival, Italianate and Neoclassical. It was listed in the National Register of Historic Places in 1976.

== History ==
=== The Gibson Family ===
William Byas Gibson (1831–1906), originally from Virginia, moved from Missouri to California in 1850 with other "overlanders" seeking fortune in California's gold laden hills. He travelled via covered wagon and settled on Cache Creek in 1850, where he built a modest home. In October 1850 he went to Scott Bar to mine gold, but found little success. He returned to Yolo County in 1851 and bought a plot of 160 acres four and a half miles north east of Woodland, where he grew grain and raised livestock. He sold this property in 1857, and purchased 320 acres of land adjoining the southern part of Woodland, CA. He built a small 16' by 20' structure on this land, which, later became the center of his 3,000 acre estate. He specialized in raising high-grade cattle, like Shorthorn Durhams. Near Christmas of 1857, William married Mary Isabel Cook (d.1915) of Kentucky. Mary was no stranger to living on farming estates. The Cook family emigrated to California in 1853 and established their own successful farm in Yolo County.

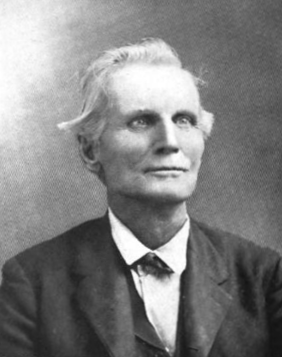
William Byas Gibson

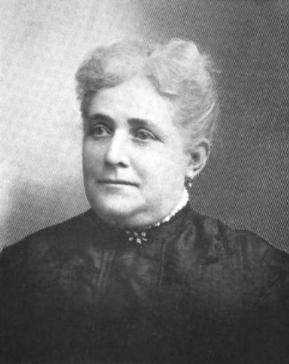
Mary Isabel Gibson

William and Mary had three sons: Robert (1859-1941), Thomas (1861-1914), and Joseph (1863-1897). William and Mary lived in the estate's main property until their deaths in 1906 and 1915. Before his death, William handed management of the estate over to his eldest son, Robert. Robert Gibson earned a business degree from Heald's Business College in San Francisco, California, and continued operating the estate's grain and livestock cultivation following his father's death. He and his wife Elnora (born Elnora Root) lived on the property until their deaths in 1941 and 1963. The second child, Thomas Ballard Gibson, also remained in Woodland. He opened a successful hardware store while also promoting the Woodland Creamery Company. Thomas remained a prominent figure in Woodland throughout his life: He served on several boards concerning local politics, education, businesses, and agriculture. He was also a member of the Native Sons of the Golden West. Thomas died on Sunday, 11 October 1914. Not much is known about the youngest son, Joseph, who died at the age of 34 in 1897.

=== The Gibson House and Ranch ===
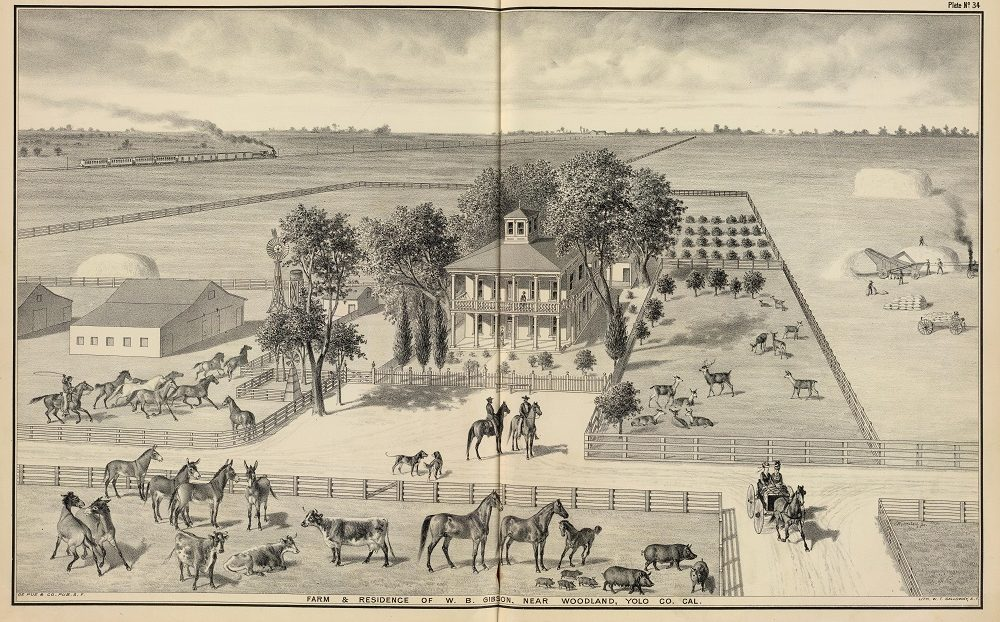
Lithograph of the William B. Gibson House. Found in the Illustrated Atlas and History of Yolo County, California. De Pue & Company, 1879. Courtesy of Yolo County Archives

The Gibson House started as a 16' by 20' structure on a 320-acre estate. After William and Mary had children, the first structure became too small. William used his increasing wealth from a successful agricultural business to enlarge the house. He made several extensions between the 1870s and the 1900s, adopting architectural styles popular during each period. The first extension, completed in 1877, included adding two large parlors on the first floor, and a second story with four bedrooms. By 1891, the Gibson estate had grown from the initial 320 acres to 2,400 acres. The farmhouse was surrounded by many outbuildings to help make the operation self-sustaining. Along with a kitchen, pantry and dining room addition to the main house, a root cellar, cook's house, tan house for water storage, workshop, smokehouse, and a bunk house for hired workers were added to the property.

The house entered a state of stasis between 1900 and 1963, with no major extensions or alterations. Meanwhile, the surrounding estate was sold for residential, commercial and agricultural development. Following Elnora Gibson's death in 1963, the home and acreage was uncared for and dilapidated. Some labeled it a haunted house during this vacancy. In 1975, efforts to purchase the house and the 2.5 acres it resides on were directed by the County of Yolo to establish it as a county park and the first countywide historical museum. Yolo County Historical Museum Corporation was incorporated in 1986, and their board of directors operated the museum on behalf of the county. In 2018, the Yolo County Board of Supervisors transferred stewardship of the house and grounds to YoloArts, the County arts organization, to change the usage of the property. The main house remains a museum, open to the public on weekdays. Two of the barns were transformed, one into a gallery space and another adapted with temperature control for archival and collection storage.

== Architectural Features and Styles ==
=== Initial Construction and Modified Georgian Revival ===
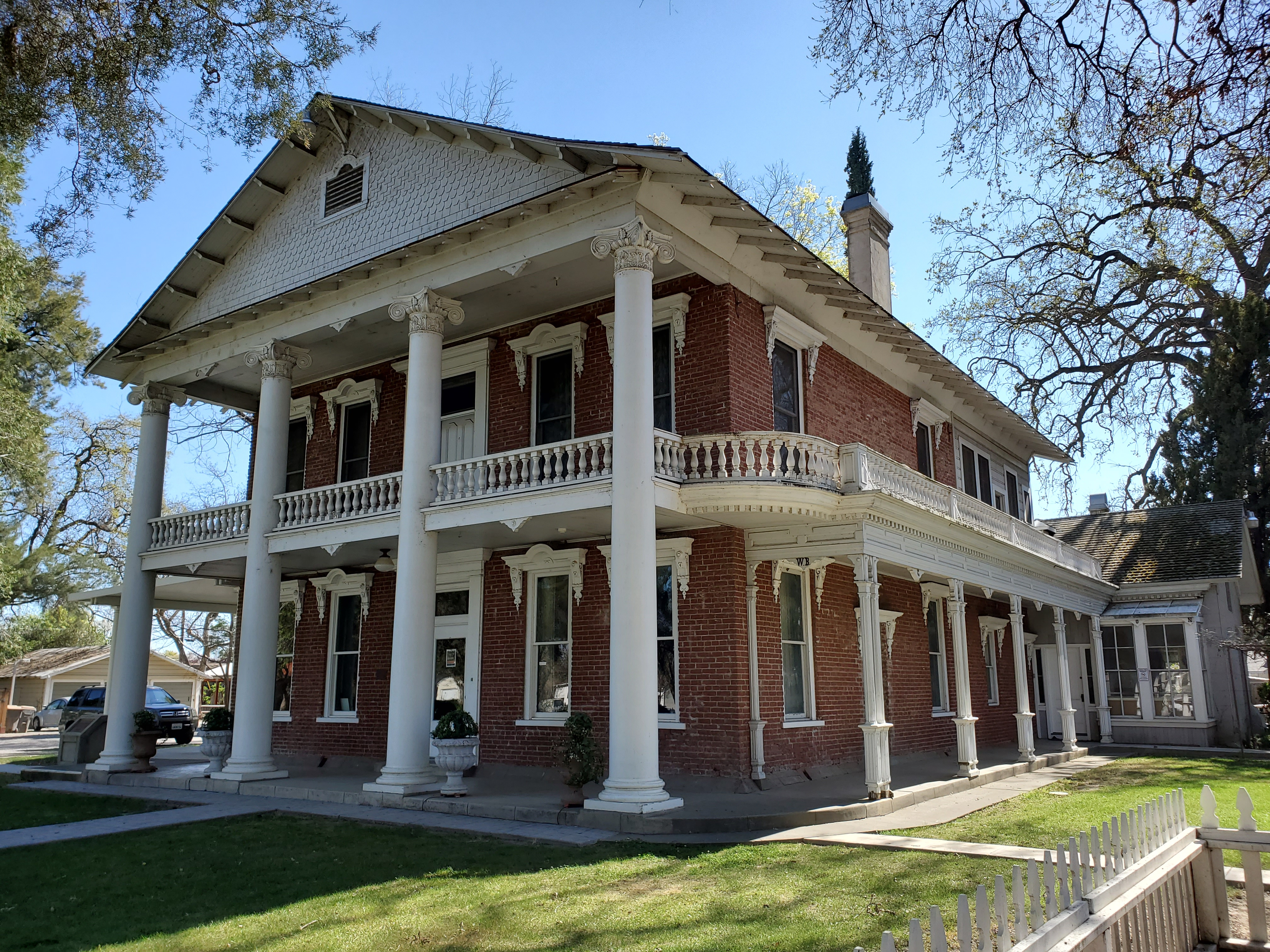
The Gibson House's northern façade; camera facing south-east

The Gibson house reflects multiple architectural styles. The oldest part of the present structure was a rectangular 16' by 20' wooden building. It is unknown how many stories it had, and whether it displayed any significant features associated with a particular architectural style. In 1877, William Gibson added a 31' by 37' brick structure north of the building, consisting of two stories with porches and balconies on the north and west sides. He next added a smaller two-story brick building to the south end of the old wooden structure, approximately 17' by 35' large. These extended several feet off each side of the old building. Gibson built around the original building instead of demolishing and rebuilding on the same plot. He incorporated the initial house into the additions. It is visible today only upon a structural inspection, mainly seen in the difference in wall thickness. The initial building's exterior walls, which were thicker than the interior walls, are visible in the doorways between the dining room and kitchen.

The 1976 National Register of Historic Places assessment identified the style of the main brick structure as modified Georgian revival due to its massing, hipped roof, and floor plan consisting of a central hallway with two rooms off to each side, each having a fireplace on the outside wall, and four bedrooms upstairs. However, Georgian style was popular in California around 1830, which is far outside of the Gibson House's construction period. A more appropriate style would be Italianate, which was popular from 1840 to 1885 and fits the house's style and construction period.

=== Italianate ===
An 1879 lithograph reflects features consistent with Italianate style. Italianate style began in England as part of the Picturesque movement. The movement responded to the formal classical ideals in art and architecture that had been fashionable for the last 200 years. It emphasized the features seen in informal Italian farmhouses, such as their square towers. In the United States, the style took on regional characteristics. In general, the style can be identified by multiple stories, a low-pitched hipped roof, and often a polygonal or square cupola placed on the roof. Other Italianate features visible on the present property include the balustraded balcony, tall double-hung windows with hood moulds, and the paneled front door with a decorative entablature and pilasters. The original square cupola was removed during the Neoclassical remodel, done between 1890 and 1900.

=== Neoclassical ===
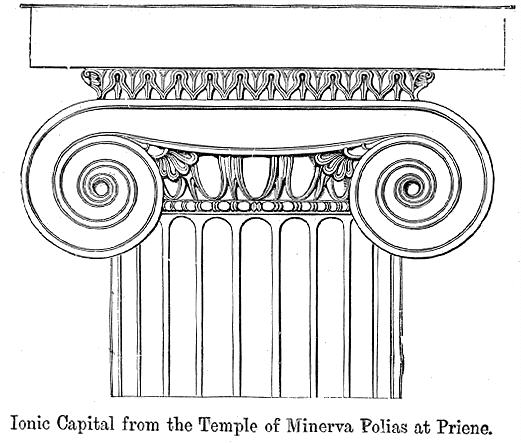
Example of an Ionic Capital from the Temple of Minerva Polias at Priene.

Neoclassical style rose in popularity from 1895 to 1955. The interest in classical architecture can be attributed to the World's Columbian Exposition, held in Chicago in 1893. The planners emphasized a classical theme, and the central court consisted of colonnaded buildings designed by some of the periods best known architects. The fair was widely attended and documented, with photos of the exhibits shared throughout the country. The monumental sized buildings influenced the construction of commercial and residential classical buildings. Some of the identifying features include full height porches supported by classical columns (with Ionic or Corinthian capitals), and a symmetrically balanced windows and central door. The Gibson House's most dominant Neoclassical features are the four columns on the northern façade. The columns have Ionic capitals, identified by the volutes. An oak leaf motif was added to the capital, likely for the surrounding oak trees that still stand on the property today. With the addition of the columnated porch, the house lost its hipped pyramid roof, at present it now has a front gable with patterned wood shingles. The original hipped shape is still visible in the attic space, suggesting the original roof was not removed during the reconstruction but instead covered. The Neoclassical additions were the last major alterations done to the house.

== As a museum ==
Gibson House was Yolo County's first countywide historical museum. It was designated by the National Park Service to be on the National Register of Historic places on November 7, 1976, about a year after the County of Yolo purchased the house. The museum houses changing exhibits relating to the history of Yolo County, designed by the County museum curator with items from the Yolo County Historical Collection. The collection consists of 11,000 objects dated between 1830 and 1930. It includes textiles, agricultural equipment, paintings, archival materials, ephemera, photographs, archaeological items, tools, ceramics, household items, furniture, and personal items. On the museum grounds, in addition to the main house there is a functional blacksmith shop and dairy display focusing on the Woodland Creamery Company.

In 2018, the Yolo County Board of Supervisors transferred stewardship of the house and grounds to YoloArts, the County arts organization, to change the usage of the property. Two of the barn spaces were remodeled during the transition. One barn became a modified gallery space, while another was adapted with temperature control to create a stable environment for the historical collection.
