= San Luis Obispo County Arts Council =

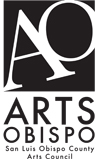
San Luis Obispo County Arts Council logo

The San Luis Obispo County Arts Council (SLOCAC) is the official San Luis Obispo County, California, USA arts council. It runs under the California state arts council, the California Arts Council (CAC).
