= California Riverside Ballet =

American ballet company

General information
- Name: California Riverside Ballet
- Year founded: 1969

California Riverside Ballet was a ballet company formerly headquartered in Riverside, California, United States, in Riverside's historic Aurea Vista Hotel, city landmark number 84. The company was founded in 1969, and operated as a non-profit organization, with support from the city of Riverside, the County of Riverside, the Riverside Arts Council, The Press-Enterprise, and other charitable donations. In addition to staging local ballet performances, the organization was known for its annual fundraiser, called Ghost Walk, that took place prior to Halloween in Downtown Riverside. Prior to closing, California Riverside Ballet also hosted multiple events in downtown Riverside each year including Spirit Walk, the Nutcracker Tea and The Nutcracker.

California Riverside Ballet created The Academy Program in June 2013 that offered affordable and free ballet training to students in low income areas.

== History ==
Founded in 1969, California Riverside Ballet (CRB) was a nonprofit ballet company and the performance arm associated with Riverside Ballet Arts. Under Artistic Director Glenda Carhart, who led both organizations beginning in 1984, CRB presented performances and educational outreach programs throughout the Inland Empire, including an annual production of The Nutcracker. In May 2010, Carhart resigned as Artistic Director of California Riverside Ballet and subsequently established Ballet Resource Active Volunteer Association (BRAVA), now known as Riverside Ballet BRAVA, as a separate nonprofit organization.
