= NCAC =

NCAC could refer to:

== Australia ==
- National Cadet Advisory Council, the link between cadets and officers in the Australian Army Cadets
- National Childcare Accreditation Council, a non-profit organization funded by and accountable to the Australian Government

== Poland ==
- Nicolaus Copernicus Astronomical Center of the Polish Academy of Sciences, an astronomy research institute in Poland

== United States ==
- National Capital Area Council of the Boy Scouts of America
- National Coalition Against Censorship
- Nevada County Arts Council, art council in Nevada County, California, USA
- North Carolina Arts Council, an organization that provides grants to artists
- North Coast Athletic Conference, an NCAA Division III athletic conference
- Northern California Athletic Conference, a former NCAA Division II football conference
- Northern Combat Area Command, a mainly Sino-American formation that participated in Burma during World War II
