= ACAC =

ACAC or acac may refer to:

- Acetylacetonate (acac), a ligand in coordination chemistry derived from acetylacetone
- ACAC consortium, a subsidiary of China Aviation Industry Corporation
- Alberta Colleges Athletics Conference, the governing body for collegiate sports in Alberta, Canada
- Amador County Arts Council, the official Amador County, US arts council
- Allen County Athletic Conference, High School conference in Indiana, US
- Atlanta Contemporary Art Center, a contemporary art museum in Atlanta
