= Calaveras County Arts Council =

The Calaveras County Arts Council is an arts council in Calaveras County, California, US, founded in 1981. It operates as a private nonprofit, 501(c)(3) public benefit corporation under the California Arts Council (CAC).
