= Breakfast with the Ones You Love =

2007 novel by Eliot Fintushel

- Cover of first edition
- Author: Eliot Fintushel
- Cover artist: Stephen Youll
- Language: English
- Genre: Fantasy
- Publisher: Bantam Books
- Publication date: 2007
- Publication place: United States
- Media type: Print (paperback, ebook)
- Pages: x, 275
- ISBN: 978-0-553-38405-5
- OCLC: 70836793

Breakfast with the Ones You Love is a contemporary fantasy novel by American author Eliot Fintushel. It was first published in ebook by Bantam Books in February 2007, followed by a trade paperback edition from the same publisher in March of the same year.

== Summary ==
Lea Tillem, a 16-year old runaway, has been battered by the world, to which she shows an emotionless face. Her only two relationships are with her talking cat Tule and her heroin-dealing boyfriend Jack Konar, whom she rescued when one of his drug deals went bad. Convinced he is one of the Chosen who will be taken up into heaven by God Tetragrammaton, Jack is "building a spaceship" (decorating an abandoned room) in the back of a Sears and Roebuck store; God's ship is to dock there when it is finished. Lea helps him in his eccentric project in the hope Jack will take her along. Complications occur. The Mafia, learning of Lea's secret ability to kill with a thought, tries to get her to fix a boxing match, which she bungles by targeting the wrong contestant; now the local boss has it in for her. A group of men called the Minyan, Jack's secret guardians, show up, one of whom turns out to be Lea's missing brother. Lea's landlady is revealed to also be able to kill with a thought. The devil possesses Lea's brother and fights off everyone else. Somehow, in all this madness, Lea starts to reconnect with the world.

== Reception ==
According to Paul Kincaid, writing in Strange Horizons, the novel "read[s] like a crazy, quirky short story that got away from the author and grew way beyond its natural length ... a pretty good novella [that] has been bulked out artificially to qualify as a novel." Finding it "edgy and involving" at first, he feels it falters once Fintushel "makes it plain that everything is meant literally. From that moment on he has to load [on] more and more weirdness ... to keep the thing moving at the headlong rush he has established." Kincaid also finds the novel's Yiddish "bounce and rhythm, which "gives [Fintushel's] short stories their particular verve and character ... rather tiring" put in the mouth of the explicitly non-Jewish narrator. He deems the book's "remorseless" pace, "succession of determinedly quirky characters," and "one-pitch narrative voice" exhausting to the reader, while noting "there are enough set-piece scenes and sparkling passages of dialogue [to] remind you how good [the author] can be when fully in control of his material."

The novel was also reviewed by Faren Miller in Locus no. 557, June 2007, and Peter Heck in Asimov's Science Fiction, December 2007.

== Awards ==
Breakfast with the Ones You Love placed eighth the 2008 Locus Poll Award for Best First Novel.
