= Kirk House (Narrowsburg, New York) =

Historic house in New York, United States

- U.S. National Register of Historic Places
- Location within New York Location within the United States
- Location: Kirk's Rd., Narrowsburg, New York
- Coordinates: 41°36′27″N 75°3′26″W
- Area: 3.1 acres (1.3 ha)
- Built: 1876
- Architect: Paul, Karl
- NRHP reference No.: 84003043
- Added to NRHP: May 10, 1984

Kirk House is a historic home located at Narrowsburg in Sullivan County, New York, United States. The original section was built in the 1840s as a one-story frame schoolhouse. It was moved to its present site in 1875 and a second story was added the following year. It measures 32 by 20 feet (9.8 by 6.1 m), three bays in length and two bays wide. It was coated with stucco in the 1920s. It features a center entrance and foll width, one story porch with Italianate style detailing.

It was added to the National Register of Historic Places in 1984.
