= Narrowsburg Methodist Church =

Historic church in New York, United States

- U.S. National Register of Historic Places
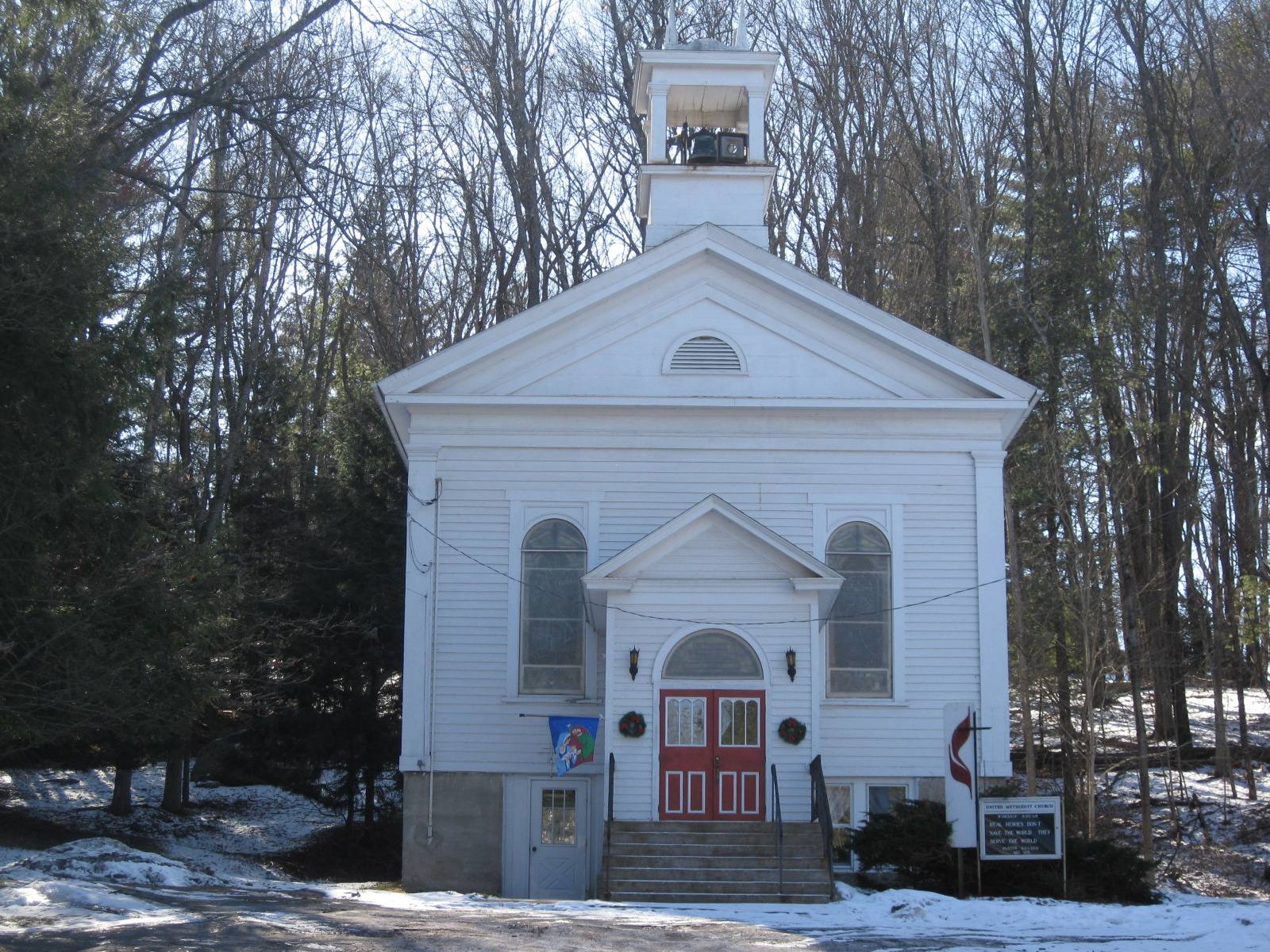
- Narrowsburg Methodist Church, February 2010

- Location within New York Location within the United States
- Location: Lake St., Narrowsburg, New York
- Coordinates: 41°36′18″N 75°3′45″W
- Area: less than one acre
- Built: 1856
- Architect: Kohler, William; Long, W.J.
- Architectural style: Greek Revival
- MPS: Upper Delaware Valley, New York and Pennsylvania MPS
- NRHP reference No.: 00000053
- Added to NRHP: February 4, 2000

Narrowsburg Methodist Church is a historic Methodist church on Lake Street in Narrowsburg, Sullivan County, New York, United States. It was built in 1856 and is a frame, Greek Revival-style, meeting house. The rectangular structure features a pedimented facade and an open belfry decorated with finials. The church was moved to its present location in 1879 and modified about 1930.

It was added to the National Register of Historic Places in 2000.
