= Cultural Arts Council of Sonoma County =

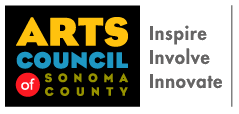
- Dissolved: October 2013
- Type: 501(c) organization
- Legal status: arts council
- Purpose: fine art
- Headquarters: Sonoma County, California
- Region served: Sonoma County, California
- Official language: English
- Affiliations: California Arts Council

The Cultural Arts Council of Sonoma County (or the Arts Council of Sonoma County) was the official Sonoma County, California, USA arts council. The council, which functioned for 26 years, was a partner of the California Arts Council. In 2002, the organization went by the Arts Council of Sonoma County, but never legally changed its name. In mid-October 2013, the Council dismissed all staff and suspended operations due to lack of funding.
