= Minneapolis Arts Commission =

America cultural organization

The Minneapolis Arts Commission is the arts council for the city of Minneapolis, Minnesota in the United States. It was established in 1974. The 17 volunteer commissioners are appointed by the mayor and city council. The commission's role includes finding support for the arts from both public and private sources.

== History ==
In the mid 1970s the Arts Commission looked for a project to provide space for arts activities in an area the city wanted to redevelop economically. They received a grant from the Design Arts program of National Endowment for the Arts to fund a feasibility study for converting the historic Masonic Temple into an arts center. The result was the opening of the Hennepin Center for the Arts in 1979.

In 1999 the commission became part of the new Office of Cultural Affairs, along with the Office of Film, Video and New Media. In 2002 this new office was cut back significantly by the mayor as part of reducing the city debt.

In the early 2000s the Arts Commission developed the new Minneapolis 10-year plan for the arts. The Minneapolis Plan for Arts and Culture was made public in September 2005.
