= Narrowsburg, New York =

- CDP
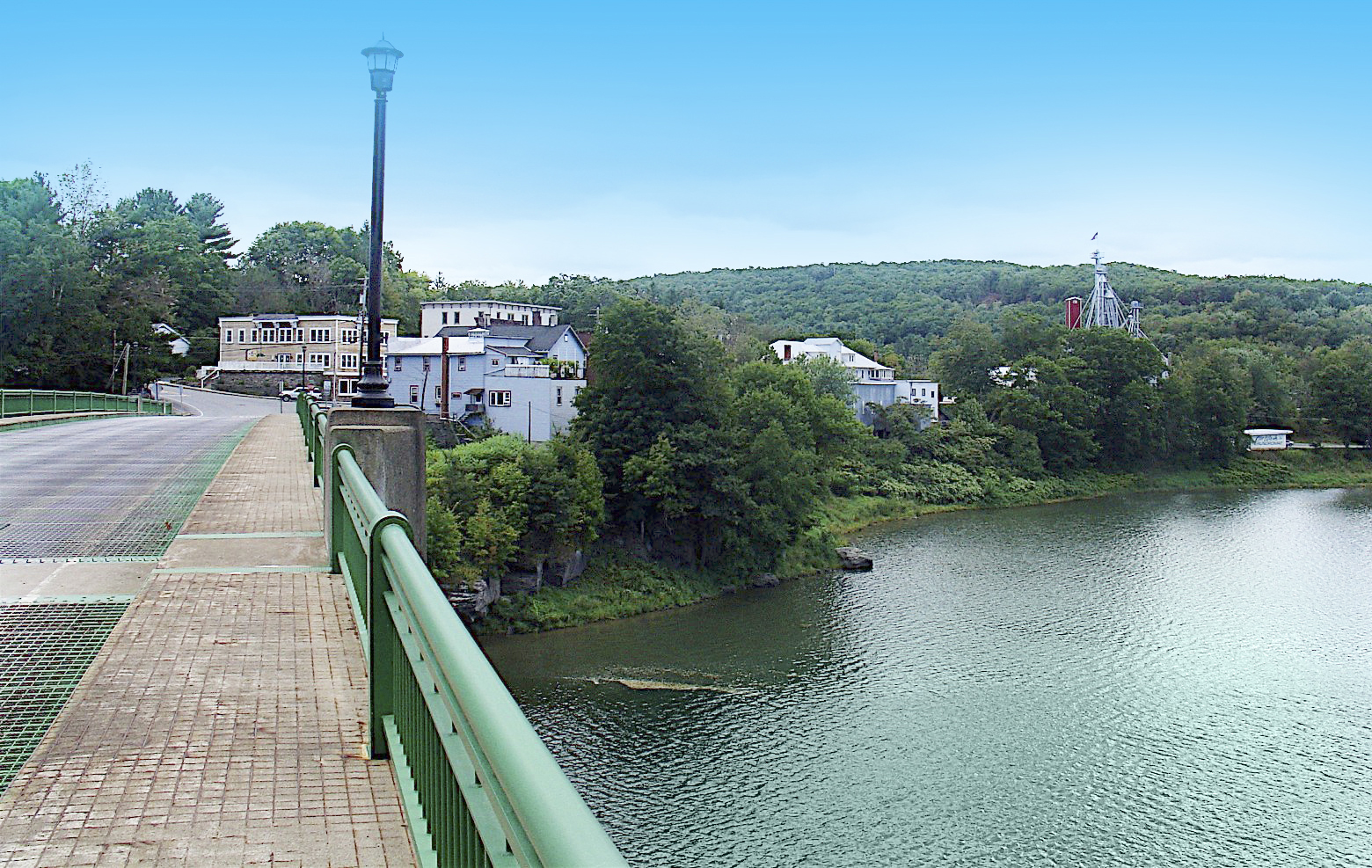
- Narrowsburg viewed from the Narrowsburg–Darbytown Bridge.

- Location of Narrowsburg in Sullivan County, New York
- Coordinates: 41°36′25″N 75°3′44″W
- Country: United States
- State: New York
- County: Sullivan

Area
  - Total: 1.96 sq mi (5.07 km^{2})
  - Land: 1.81 sq mi (4.68 km^{2})
  - Water: 0.15 sq mi (0.39 km^{2})
- Elevation: 663 ft (202 m)

Population (2020)
  - Total: 379
  - Density: 210/sq mi (80.9/km^{2})
- Time zone: UTC-5 (Eastern (EST))
  - Summer (DST): UTC-4 (EDT)
- ZIP code: 12764
- Area code: 845
- FIPS code: 36-49473
- GNIS feature ID: 0958272

Narrowsburg is a hamlet (and a census-designated place) in Sullivan County, New York, United States. The population was 379 at the 2020 census. Narrowsburg is in the western part of the Town of Tusten at the junction of Routes 52 and 97.

== History ==
The community was first called "Homans Eddy" after Benjamin Homan, the first settler in the town.

The Arlington Hotel, Kirk House, and Narrowsburg Methodist Church are listed on the National Register of Historic Places.

== Geography ==
Narrowsburg is located at 41°36′25″N 75°3′44″W (41.606881, -75.062255).

According to the United States Census Bureau, the CDP has a total area of 1.5 square miles (3.9 km^{2}), of which 1.4 square miles (3.6 km^{2}) is land and 0.1 square miles (0.26 km^{2}) (8.61%) is water.

The community is situated on the eastern shore of the Delaware River, adjacent to the border of Pennsylvania. It is between the Catskill Mountains and the Pocono Mountains.

== Demographics ==
Historical population
Census	Pop.	Note	%±
2010	431		—
2020	379		−12.1%
U.S. Decennial Census

As of the census of 2010, there were 431 people, 190 households, and 119 families residing in the CDP. The population density was 300.7 inhabitants per square mile (116.1/km^{2}). There were 254 housing units at an average density of 184.5 per square mile (71.2/km^{2}). The racial makeup of the CDP was 91.9% White, 1.6% African American, 2.6% Asian, 1.6% from other races, and 2.3% from two or more races. Hispanic or Latino of any race were 3.0% of the population.

There were 189 households, out of which 25.9% had children under the age of 18 living with them, 50.8% were married couples living together and 37.6% were non-families. 35.4% of all households were made up of individuals, and 20.1% had someone living alone who was 65 years of age or older. The average household size was 2.19 and the average family size was 2.80.

In the CDP, the population was spread out, with 21.7% under the age of 18, 3.6% from 18 to 24, 24.6% from 25 to 44, 25.8% from 45 to 64, and 24.2% who were 65 years of age or older. The median age was 46 years. For every 100 females, there were 90.8 males. For every 100 females age 18 and over, there were 89.5 males.

The median income for a household in the CDP was $35,694, and the median income for a family was $44,688. Males had a median income of $33,500 versus $26,563 for females. The per capita income for the CDP was $19,577. About 5.3% of families and 4.7% of the population were below the poverty line, including 4.3% of those under age 18 and 3.5% of those age 65 or over.

== Arts and culture ==
Narrowsburg is the home of the Delaware Valley Arts Alliance (DVAA), the Arts Council for Sullivan County, which offers art exhibitions, Big Eddy Film Festival, Deep Water Literary Fest, Riverfest, and concerts at the Tusten Theatre.

== See also ==
- Ten Mile River Boy Scout Camp
