= City of San Diego Commission for Arts and Culture =

The City of San Diego Commission for Arts and Culture is the official arts council for San Diego, California. The commission consists of 15 volunteers appointed by the mayor of San Diego, supported by a professional staff.

The commission was established by city ordinance in 1988 as part of Mayor Maureen O'Connor's "Year of the Arts" proclamation. It serves in an advisory capacity to the mayor and the San Diego City Council on promoting, encouraging and increasing support for the arts and culture institutions of San Diego. The first chairman was Milton "Micky" Fredman.

It is the commission's responsibility to make all recommendations pertaining to arts and culture for city funding to the city council. The commission makes grants through a competitive application process under two categories: organizational support for nonprofit arts and culture organizations, and support for specific projects. Its funds come from a portion the city's transient occupancy tax as well as from grants from the California Arts Council, the National Endowment for the Arts, and other sources.

== Impact ==
The commission believes that arts and cultural organizations and activities promote a better quality of life for local residents. Such activities also play a major role in the tourism industry; 2.7 million visitors in 2007 made their travel decision based primarily on the city's cultural attractions. Arts and culture also provide employment for the area; the 85 organizations funded by the commission in 2005 provide more than 4,500 jobs for area residents. In 2009 the commission funded 76 organizations, which directly stimulated the local economy to the tune of $181 million and attracted 1.46 million arts-and-culture tourists who pumped $750 million into the local economy.
