= Riverside Arts Council =

The Riverside Arts Council (RAC) is the official Riverside County, California, USA arts council.

The Arts Council became a non-profit organization in 1978 to better serve the growing needs for arts services and programs in the City and County of Riverside. In 1981, the Arts Council became the designated County partner of the California Arts Council’s State-Local Partnership Program, and the central source for arts services, information, and advocacy throughout Riverside County.

Through innovative community and arts partnerships, education, outreach and other programs and services to the arts, Riverside Arts Council continues to demonstrate leadership in the development and cultural vitality of the communities it serves.
