= National Culture Fund of Bulgaria =

The National Culture Fund of Bulgaria is the official arts council for Bulgaria.

National Culture Fund is the Bulgarian organization that supports on national level the creation, development and distribution of Bulgarian culture and arts in the country and abroad.
