= ABCA3 =

Protein-coding gene in humans

Identifiers
- Aliases: ABCA3, ATP-binding cassette, sub-family A (ABC1), member 3, ABC-C, ABC3, EST111653, LBM180, SMDP3, ATP binding cassette subfamily A member 3
- External IDs: OMIM: 601615; MGI: 1351617; GeneCards: ABCA3
Enzyme activity
EC #	BRENDA	ExPASy	KEGG	MetaCyc
7.6.2.1	↗	↗	↗	↗
7.6.2.2	↗	↗	↗	↗

Gene location (Human)
Chr.	Chromosome 16 (human)
Band	16p13.3	Start	2,275,881 bp
Band	16p13.3	End	2,340,746 bp

Gene location (Mouse)
Chr.	Chromosome 17 (mouse)
Band	17|17 A3.3	Start	24,570,924 bp
Band	17|17 A3.3	End	24,629,175 bp
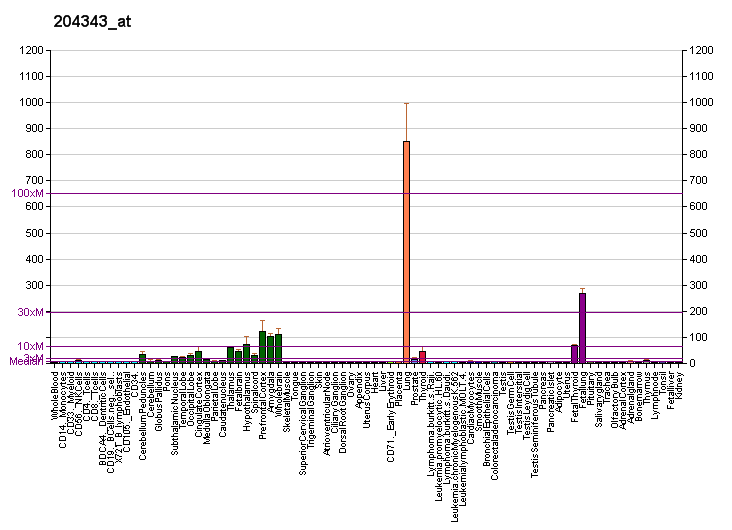
RNA expression pattern
Bgee	Human / Mouse (ortholog); Top expressed in: lower lobe of lung; upper lobe of lung; upper lobe of left lung; right hemisphere of cerebellum; frontal pole; paraflocculus of cerebellum; tendon of biceps brachii; prefrontal cortex; right frontal lobe; inferior olivary nucleus / Top expressed in: left lung lobe; right lung; right lung lobe; human kidney; vestibular membrane of cochlear duct; transitional epithelium of urinary bladder; right kidney; Rostral migratory stream; facial motor nucleus; trigeminal ganglion; More reference expression data
BioGPS	More reference expression data
Gene ontology
Molecular function	ATPase-coupled transmembrane transporter activity; nucleotide binding; ATPase activity; ATP binding; transporter activity; lipid transporter activity
Cellular component	lamellar body membrane; integral component of membrane; plasma membrane; membrane; alveolar lamellar body membrane; alveolar lamellar body; extracellular space; intracellular membrane-bounded organelle
Biological process	lipid transport; response to glucocorticoid; transmembrane transport; transport
Sources:Amigo / QuickGO
Orthologs
Databases	NCBI: entry; OMA: entry
Species	Human	Mouse
Entrez	21	27410
Ensembl	ENSG00000167972	ENSMUSG00000024130
UniProt	Q99758	Q8R420
RefSeq (mRNA)	NM_001089	NM_001039581; NM_013855
RefSeq (protein)	NP_001080	NP_001034670; NP_038883
Location (UCSC)	Chr 16: 2.28 – 2.34 Mb	Chr 17: 24.57 – 24.63 Mb
PubMed search
- Wikidata
View/Edit Human	View/Edit Mouse

ATP-binding cassette sub-family A member 3 is a protein that in humans is encoded by the ABCA3 gene.

The membrane-associated protein encoded by this gene is a member of the superfamily of ATP-binding cassette (ABC) transporters. ABC proteins transport various molecules across extra- and intracellular membranes. ABC genes are divided into seven distinct subfamilies (ABC1, MDR/TAP, MRP, ALD, OABP, GCN20, White). This protein is a member of the ABC1 subfamily. Members of the ABC1 subfamily comprise the only major ABC subfamily found exclusively in multicellular eukaryotes. The full transporter encoded by this gene may be involved in development of resistance to xenobiotics and engulfment during programmed cell death.

== Clinical significance ==
Mutations in ABCA3 are associated to cataract-microcornea syndrome.

It is associated with Surfactant metabolism dysfunction type 3.

== See also ==
- ATP-binding cassette transporter
