= Arts Council Napa Valley =

Coordinates: 38.29804°N 122.29362°W

Arts Council Napa Valley (ACNV) is the officially designated local arts agency (LAA) for Napa County, California. Established in 1963, it became a 501(c)3 nonprofit organization in 1981. ACNV advances the arts in Napa County through diverse cultural programs and community services responding to its three core initiatives: Cultural Marketing, Art in Public Spaces, and Arts in Education.

== Funding ==
Arts Council Napa Valley is in part funded by the California state arts council, the California Arts Council (CAC), the Hewlett Foundation, Napa Valley Community Foundation, and James Irvine Foundation, in addition to private donors.
