= Amador County Arts Council =

Amador County Arts Council logo

The Amador County Arts Council (ACAC) is the official Amador County, United States, arts council.

A non-profit, local partner of the California Arts Council.

== Mission ==
The Amador County Arts Council's mission is to Support Promote and Encourage the Arts in our Schools and Community.

== Programs ==
=== ACAC Arts in Education Program ===
To help local schools maintain the arts as an integral part of their children's curriculum.
