= Florida Keys Council of the Arts =

American cultural organization

Florida Keys Council of the Arts is a leading cultural organization in the Florida Keys, and serves the population from Key Largo to Key West. A non-profit local arts agency, it makes grants, operates the Monroe County Art in Public Places program, sponsors seminars, and manages the on-line cultural calendar for the region . It also manages the County's Cultural Umbrella grants process, under the Tourism Development Council and serves as a leading advocate for cultural tourism on lower Florida. In 1998, the Florida Keys Council of the Arts was designated by the Board of Monroe County Commissioners as the area's Local Arts Agency as provided by Florida Statute 286.011.

The Florida Keys Council of the Arts is currently the main source of information on arts and culture in the Keys. The Council also presents residencies and concerts by performing and literary artists, rotating exhibits in public buildings by visual artists, and music in public places by local musicians in a hospital, a convalescent center, two airports, three government buildings, four senior citizen centers, five county commissioner offices, and six to twelve schools.

The Council also maintains an artist registry; publishes and distributes a weekly and quarterly Cultural Calendar, gallery guide, and a map to historic WPA artwork in the Keys; as well as maintaining the website, www.keysarts.com. The executive director, Elizabeth S. Young serves as staff and liaison to the County Art in Public Places Committee and the City of Key West Art in Public Places Board. Other ongoing initiatives include managing a county-wide Performing Arts Network, a Children's Festival of the Arts, and (with The Studios of Key West and Sculpture Key West) helped facilitate the 2007 Arts Speak gathering for local cultural leaders.

== Cultural Umbrella Program ==
In the 1980s, the citizens of Monroe County passed referendums authorizing a 3-cent sales tax on tourist lodging (the bed tax) to be used for tourism advertising, promotion, and some tourist related capital projects.

The Board of County Commissioners passed several ordinances to implement this tax including one that created a Tourist Development Council to recommend expenditures of the bed tax revenue and to administer the expenditures. To accommodate the different geographic communities of the Keys, five District Advisory Committees were created. They are DAC I-Key West; DAC 2–The Lower Keys: DAC 3–Marathon; DAC 4–Islamorada; and DAC 5–Key Largo. The DACs recommend expenditures for approximately one-third of the revenue which is divided among the districts according to the percentage of revenue collected in the district.

To accommodate three keys-wide tourism industries, three "umbrellas" were created: the Dive Umbrella, the Fishing Umbrella, and the Cultural Umbrella. DACs and Umbrellas are unique to Monroe County.

== Public Art Program ==
The Florida Keys Council of the Arts serves as staff to the Art in Public Places committee. This committee is charged with purchase and installation of artwork under a 1% for art program in any new major county construction.

The first 1% project, The Roth Building on Plantation Key, was completed in 2003. Projects currently underway include the Freeman Justice Center in Key West; Fire Stations in Key Largo, Big Pine and Conch Key; the Key West International Airport and the Murray Nelson Government Building in Key Largo.

The Arts Council also facilitates rotating art exhibits in eleven public buildings and several commissioners’ offices, all curated by volunteers from the Keys community. Musicians are sponsored in concert series in the lower keys hospital and six senior citizen centers, and the airport PA features original local recorded music.
