= Nevada County Arts Council =

Art council in Nevada County, California, USA

Nevada County Arts & Culture (formerly the Nevada County Arts Council) is the arts council for Nevada County, California. It partners with the California Arts Council.

In 2017, California Arts Council selected 14 California Cultural Districts. Nevada County is home to two: Grass Valley-Nevada City and Truckee.
