= Delaware Valley Arts Alliance =

Arts organization in Sullivan County, New York

The Delaware Valley Arts Alliance is a nonprofit arts organization and the Arts Council for Sullivan County, New York.

Located in Narrowsburg, NY, DVAA offers art galleries, performances and cultural programming at the historic Arlington Hotel and Tusten Theatre. DVAA supports local artists with gallery exhibitions and grant funding. Founder Elaine Giguere retired from her role as executive director in 2017. Some of DVAA's programs include Big Eddy Film Festival and Riverfest.
