= Arts Council for Monterey County =

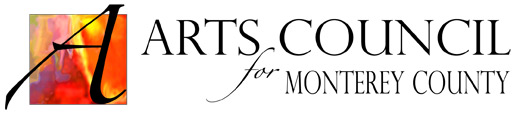
Logo for Arts Council for Monterey County

Arts Council for Monterey County, formerly known as The Cultural Council for Monterey County (CCMC), is the official arts agency for Monterey County, California. Arts4MC, a non-for-profit organization promotes and supports arts education, appreciation and excellence in the arts throughout Monterey County. Formed in 1982, the nonprofit agency also serves as Monterey County's officially designated local partner to the California Arts Council. In 1985, the County of Monterey first contracted with the council to provide cultural services to improve the economic health of the region — with funding from the county's Tourism Occupancy Tax.

James Alinder, Ilene Tuttle, George De Groat, Todd Lueders, George Faul, and Helen Kingsley, along with the support of Ansel Adams, created the Council in 1982 as part of a nationwide movement powered by the National Endowment for the Arts, “to develop and assist art and cultural programs, and to promote the employment of artists within the county.”

The council is partially funded through a hotel tax.
