= Mendocino Ballet =

The Mendocino Ballet is the official dance company for Mendocino County, California, USA. It consists of two main parts, the Mendocino Ballet Company formed in 1984, and the Mendocino Ballet School formed in 2001 as a classical ballet school. Mendocino Ballet received its non-profit corporation status in 1985. It is the only dance program in the area with classical ballet as its foundation.

The Mendocino Ballet performs at the Mendocino's center theater. The company puts on two shows per year: a production of The Nutcracker and a ballet of the director's choice in the spring.

Founded by Mary Knight Morris, the company was passed over to the present director Trudy McCreanor, thus making the Mendocino Ballet Company. Since then, the company has been involved in many cultural exchange programs with companies from France. The company has also taken part in numerous dance festivals across the country, such as Regional Dance America, under the direction of Knight and McCreanor.

Mendocino Ballet has produced many students that go on to professional dance careers. Students are given the opportunity to audition for summer programs for world-renowned companies such as American Ballet Theatre and the San Francisco Ballet.
