= Cataract-microcornea syndrome =

- Other names: Microcornea cataract syndrome
- Cataract-microcornea syndrome is inherited in an autosomal dominant manner.

Cataract-microcornea syndrome is a rare genetic syndrome characterized by congenital cataracts and microcornea in the absence of any other systemic anomaly or dysmorphism. Clinical findings include a reduction in corneal diameter (less than 10 mm) in both meridians in an otherwise normal eye, as well as an inherited cataract, that is primarily bilateral posterior polar with opacification within the lens periphery which advances to form a total cataract after visual maturity is achieved. Other ocular manifestations, such as myopia, iris coloboma, sclerocornea, and Peters anomaly, may be observed.

== Signs and symptoms ==
Congenital cataract is a lens transparency disorder that occurs at birth or soon after. It is a leading cause of treatable vision loss or visual impairment in children. A cataract is a clouding of the eye's lens. and is caused by a disruption in the normal structure or function of the lens protein, resulting in opacity.

Microcornea is a congenital corneal abnormality in which the cornea and anterior segment of the eye are less developed than normal. Even in adulthood, the horizontal diameter of the cornea stays under 10 mm.

== Causes ==
Cataract-microcornea syndrome is thought to be caused by mutations in the ABCA3 gene.

== See also ==
- Cataract
- ABCA3
