= 2002 Bromont municipal election =

The 2002 Bromont municipal election took place on 3 November 2002, to elect a mayor and councillors in Bromont, Quebec. Incumbent mayor Pauline Quinlan was re-elected to a second mandate without difficulty.

== Results ==
2002 Bromont election, Mayor of Bromont
Candidate	Total votes	% of total votes
Pauline Quinlan (incumbent)	2,051	82.84
Pierre Jacob	425	17.16
Total valid votes	2,476	100.00

2002 Bromont election, Councillor, District One
Candidate	Total votes	% of total votes
Donald Demers	269	69.69
Jean McMaster (incumbent)	117	30.31
Total valid votes	386	100.00

2002 Bromont election, Councillor, District Two
Candidate	Total votes	% of total votes
Patrick Charbonneau	339	62.32
Pierre Brossard (incumbent)	205	37.68
Total valid votes	544	100.00

- Patrick Charbonneau is the son of former Cowansville mayor Jacques Charbonneau and the brother of Canadian Football League player Steve Charbonneau. Both Charbonneau and Brossard focused their campaigns on environmental concerns. In 2005, Charbonneau took part in a press conference to announce that Bromont's equestrian site from the 1976 Summer Olympics would be devoted to a permanent horse track. He did not seek re-election in 2005.

2002 Bromont election, Councillor, District Three
Candidate	Total votes	% of total votes
Jean-Marc Malthais	223	51.15
Onil Couture (incumbent)	213	48.85
Total valid votes	436	100.00

2002 Bromont election, Councillor, District Four
Candidate	Total votes	% of total votes
Paul Rolland (incumbent)	328	67.49
Chantal Lecourt	158	32.51
Total valid votes	486	100.00

2002 Bromont election, Councillor, District Five
Candidate	Total votes	% of total votes
Real Brunelle	246	61.50
Jean-Guy Tarte (incumbent)	154	38.50
Total valid votes	400	100.00

2002 Bromont election, Councillor, District Six
Candidate	Total votes	% of total votes
Serge Dion	178	59.73
Marcel Dion (incumbent)	120	40.27
Total valid votes	298	100.00

Source: Maurice Crossfield, "Quinlan re-elected Bromont mayor by landslide," Sherbrooke Record, 4 November 2002, p. 10.
