= 2009 Bromont municipal election =

The 2009 Bromont municipal election took place on November 1, 2009, to elect a mayor and councillors in Bromont, Quebec. Incumbent mayor Pauline Quinlan was re-elected to another term without difficulty.

== Results ==
2009 Bromont election, Mayor of Bromont
Candidate	Total votes	% of total votes
(incumbent)Pauline Quinlan	2,205	75.90
Gilles Duchesne	700	24.10
Total valid votes	2,905	100.00

2009 Bromont election, Councillor, District One
Candidate	Total votes	% of total votes
(incumbent)Jean-Marc Maltais	298	61.44
Jean McMaster	187	38.56
Total valid votes	485	100.00

2009 Bromont election, Councillor, District Two
Candidate	Total votes	% of total votes
Marie-Claude Cabana	284	52.01
(incumbent)Alain Chénier	262	47.99
Total valid votes	546	100.00

2009 Bromont election, Councillor, District Three
Candidate	Total votes	% of total votes
Diane Perron	238	57.63
(incumbent)Onil Couture	175	42.37
Total valid votes	413	100.00

2009 Bromont election, Councillor, District Four
Candidate	Total votes	% of total votes
Marie-Ève Lagacé	435	64.93
Sylvain Cormier	106	15.82
Simon Gnocchini Messier	65	9.70
Pierre Brassard	64	9.55
Total valid votes	670	100.00

2009 Bromont election, Councillor, District Five
Candidate	Total votes	% of total votes
Jacques Lapensée	274	81.07
Maurice Desruisseaux	64	28.93
Total valid votes	338	100.00

2009 Bromont election, Councillor, District Six
Candidate	Total votes	% of total votes
Anie Perrault	214	50.23
Claude Nadeau	155	36.38
Michel M. Champagne	57	13.38
Total valid votes	426	100.00

Source: Simon-Olivier Lorange, Confiance renouvelée en Pauline Quinlan, 2 November 2009, accessed 18 November 2010.
