= 2005 Bromont municipal election =

Political election

The 2005 Bromont municipal election took place on November 6, 2005, to elect a mayor and councillors in Bromont, Quebec. Incumbent mayor Pauline Quinlan was re-elected to a third mandate without difficulty.

== Results ==
2005 Bromont election, Mayor of Bromont
| Candidate | Total votes | % of total votes |
|---|---|---|
| (incumbent)Pauline Quinlan | 1,791 | 72.69 |
| Ruth Dupont | 673 | 27.31 |
| Total valid votes | 2,464 | 100.00 |

2005 Bromont election, Councillor, District One
| Candidate | Total votes | % of total votes |
|---|---|---|
| (incumbent)Jean-Marc Maltais | accl. | . |

2005 Bromont election, Councillor, District Two
| Candidate | Total votes | % of total votes |
|---|---|---|
| Alain Chénier | 234 | 45.26 |
| Michel Bilodeau | 230 | 44.49 |
| Yves R. Gosselin | 53 | 10.25 |
| Total valid votes | 517 | 100.00 |

2005 Bromont election, Councillor, District Three
| Candidate | Total votes | % of total votes |
|---|---|---|
| (incumbent)Onil Couture | 209 | 51.86 |
| Diane Perron | 194 | 48.14 |
| Total valid votes | 403 | 100.00 |

2005 Bromont election, Councillor, District Four
| Candidate | Total votes | % of total votes |
|---|---|---|
| (incumbent)Paul Rolland | 425 | 66.93 |
| Pierre Brassard | 210 | 33.07 |
| Total valid votes | 635 | 100.00 |

- Paul Rolland has worked with the government of Quebec, including a tenure as cabinet director for the ministry of Municipal Affairs. An experienced municipal politician, he was the only incumbent councillor in Bromont to be re-elected in 2002. He stood down in 2009.

2005 Bromont election, Councillor, District Five
| Candidate | Total votes | % of total votes |
|---|---|---|
| (incumbent)Real Brunelle | accl. | . |

2005 Bromont election, Councillor, District Six
| Candidate | Total votes | % of total votes |
|---|---|---|
| (incumbent)Serge Dion | accl. | . |

Source: Joshua Bleser, "Pauline Quinlan returned as mayor of Bromont," Sherbrooke Record, 7 November 2005, p. 4.
