= Gogisgi =

American poet

Gogisgi (1927–1997), who also published under his baptismal name of Carroll Arnett, who self-identified as the Deer Clan Chief of the Overhill Band of the Cherokee Nation, and also one of the most prolific self-identified Cherokee poets.

== Bibliography ==
- Spells. Blue Creek, OH : Bloody Twin Press, 1995.
- Night perimeter : new and selected poems 1958-1990. Greenfield Center, NY : Greenfield Review Press, 1991.
- Engine. Norman, OK : Point Riders Press, 1988.
- Rounds. Merrick, NY : Cross-Cultural Communications, 1982.
- American Indian chapbook. Beloit, WI. : Beloit Poetry Journal, 1980.
- South line : poems. New Rochelle, NY : Elizabeth Press, 1979.
- Tsalagi : poems. New Rochelle, NY : Elizabeth Press, 1976.
- Come. New Rochelle, NY : Elizabeth Press, 1973.
- Earlier. New Rochelle, NY : Elizabeth Press, 1972.
- Through the woods. New Rochelle, NY : Elizabeth Press, 1971.
- Like a wall. New Rochelle, NY : Elizabeth Press, 1969.
- Not only that. New Rochelle, NY : Elizabeth Press, 1967.
- Then : poems. New Rochelle, NY : Elizabeth Press, 1965.
