= Arts Council~Haliburton Highlands =

The Arts Council~Haliburton Highlands is an arts council in Haliburton County, Ontario, Canada; serve as a catalyst for community economic development through the arts.

== History ==
In 1968 the Haliburton School of The Arts was founded by a local group (the Haliburton Highlands Guild of Fine Arts) in collaboration with the new Sir Sandford Fleming College started in the same year in Peterborough. The school began to attract artists to the community to teach the courses and helped to develop a growing community of artists who made their living in the county. The guild supported the development of small groups that began developing arts activity. This led to the creation of the Rails End Gallery in 1979, the Haliburton Concert Series (offering three (mostly classical) concerts each year) and the Haliburton County Studio Tour in 1987. The guild now operates as Rails End Gallery and Arts Centre. The Haliburton School of The Arts grew to be one of Canada's largest art schools.

In 1997, an Arts Committee was formed as an ad hoc committee of the Community Economic Development Committee of the Haliburton County Development Corporation to support local economic development through the promotion and advancement of the visual arts in Haliburton County. This committee undertook initiatives including the installation of public sculptures, creation of the Haliburton Sculpture Forest, development of marketing materials related to the visual arts and professional development workshops for visual artists.

In parallel with these initiatives to promote the visual arts in Haliburton County, a 230-seat theatre was constructed in conjunction with the expansion of the Haliburton Highlands Secondary school and the creation of the Highlands Summer Festival.

The municipalities of Minden Hills and Dysart et al. began investing in the enhancement of the public galleries in Minden and Haliburton to allow for year-round operations. The Haliburton School of The Arts built a year-round campus in a park setting in 2003 and offers programs attracting, 3500 part-time students and 120 students in ten 15-week programs. The Haliburton County Folk Society was created in 1999 and runs an open stage once a month, a series of performances by singer-songwriters and a small folk festival.

Highlands Media Arts, committed to video arts, was formed in 2003, and the Haliburton Highlands Writers and Editors Network was created in 2004.

== Founding ==
In 2002, the Arts Committee, in collaboration with other arts organizations in the county, formed a committee to create a plan for the development and promotion of the arts (not just the visual arts) in Haliburton County, and to create a body to coordinate the implementation of the plan.

The Arts Council~Haliburton Highlands was formed under the umbrella of the Haliburton County Development Corporation in the fall of 2003. Fifteen individuals involved in a range of artistic disciplines and arts organizations formed the first Steering Committee.

In its first year of operation the Arts Council co-founded the Haliburton Tourism Coalition which represents all of the providers of tourism products in the county, was invited to sit on the Economic Diversification Committee of the County of Haliburton (which was the committee of the County Council responsible for the implementation of the county strategic plan) and was chosen to participate in Artscape's first Creative Cluster program. The county adopted the slogan "A Natural Work of Art" as part of its brand image.

In the fall of 2005 the membership of the Arts Council elected a board of directors (to replace the steering committee) and adopted a set of by-laws and filed for incorporation. The Arts Council has a membership of 320 including artists, arts businesses, arts organizations, supporting businesses and organizations and individuals.

== Arts Council programs ==
=== Artists in the Schools & Community ===
Since 2004, the Arts Council has been putting artists from Haliburton County into local elementary schools. Each classroom involved in the program participates in six 100-minute sessions with the artists. Due to the costs associated with running the program, the Arts Council undertakes fund-raising annually.

=== The Annual Arts Honours Gala ===
Annually, the Arts Council recognizes the individuals and groups that are involved with the arts in Haliburton County. Award categories include: "Artist of Distinction", "Emerging Artist", and "Supporter and Founder".

=== AGM and Arty Party ===
Held each year, the AGM is where those who will represent the organization on the board are elected. After the meeting, the Arty Party (a social gathering for artists and supporters), follows. In the past, both events have been held at the Fleming College campus in Haliburton.

== Membership of the Arts Council ==
Those who have membership with the organization include 300 artists, businesses, organizations and supporters of the arts. These members are listed in 'The Arts Directory', which is distributed annually at various locations throughout Haliburton County and Ontario.
