= Santa Barbara County Arts Commission =

Arts agency in California

The Santa Barbara County Arts Commission is the official arts council of Santa Barbara County, California, USA.

== History ==
Formed in 1977, the Santa Barbara County Arts Commission is a 15-member body appointed by the County Board of Supervisors with three members from each of the five supervisorial districts who make recommendations to the Board on cultural arts policy. The Santa Barbara County Arts Commissioners serve as community ambassadors for County arts projects and as liaisons between the communities they serve and the Board of Supervisors.

The Arts Commission has several important functions, including: making recommendations for the Percent for the Arts program, which establishes public art throughout the county; serving on grant panels for the County Arts Enrichment grant awards, and determining the recipients of the Santa Barbara Bowl Community Arts Subsidy; determining an annual County Leadership in Art award recipient; and helping to generate and recommend cultural arts policy for county constituents.

The Santa Barbara County Arts Commission meets monthly on the second Wednesday of each month, at 1:30 p.m., at locations throughout the County. Arts Commission meetings are open to the public and Commissioners welcome members of the public to join meetings and share ideas during the public comment period at the beginning of each meeting.
