= Sudbury Arts Council =

The Sudbury Arts Council is a non-profit organization based in Greater Sudbury, Ontario, Canada. It was created in 1974 as the Sudbury Arts Festival Association, and legally incorporated as the Sudbury Arts Council in June 1989. They work to promote the arts in the City of Greater Sudbury.

The Sudbury Arts Council was instrumental in establishing Cinefest, the Artists’ Studio Tour and the Sudbury Writers’ Guild. In June 2013, SAC held a literary festival WORDSTOCK SUDBURY. Special guest was Tomson Highway. This event has since become a successful annual event managed by an independent board of directors.

In 2014, the Sudbury Arts Council took a lead role in establishing the Celebration of the Arts, a gala event that honours artists and raises money for artists’ bursaries. It took place May 1, 2014. Visual artist Heather Topp and writer Matthew Heiti were honoured. The event ran annually until 2020 and provided about $60,000 in support to local artists. Financial support came from generous community sponsors.

Rendezvous North, Oct. 14 and 15 2022, organized by the Sudbury Arts Council (SAC) and the City of Greater Sudbury, offered workshops and networking experiences to explore innovative ideas for post-COVID 19 challenges. More than 40 presenters shared their experiences with artists and art organization representatives from across Northern Ontario.

Presidents of the arts council have included Real Fortin, Kirk Petersen, Gerry Labelle, Laurence Steven, Louise Lane, Ed Tate, Will Morin, Derek Young, Gord Harris, Barb Stopicati, John Lindsay, Vicki Gilhula, Andrew Boyd, and Linda Cartier.

SAC projects have included:

- Cinefest (1989-1991) started under the auspices of SAC before becoming an independent board.
- Artitst Studio Tour
- Wordstock Sudbury
- Artrepreneur
- Gallery 6500 at the Steelworkets Hall
- Jazzed Up Downtown Saturdays
- Passport to the Arts
- CKLU/STC/SAC Podcast on CKLU and Eastlink
- Virtual Art Crawl
- Hybrid Art Crawl
- Rendezvous North
- Arts Meets Business with Chamber of Commerce
- State of the Arts Sudbury Star Column
- Advocate for Bell Museum, Cambrian College Music and Museums/Heritage
- Sudbury Celebration of the Arts
- History Walk in Downtown Sudbury, 2021
- SAC President’s Award/Oryst Sawchuk Award
- Co-host of Mayoralty Candidates meetings
- Rondezvous North Conference 2022
- Journal Calendar project 2023, 2024
