= Hillsborough Arts Council =

Hillsborough Arts Council is a nonprofit arts organization based in Hillsborough, North Carolina. The organization supports local artists and provides community arts programming, exhibitions, public events, and educational opportunities in Hillsborough.

== History and organization ==
Founded more than 35 years ago, the Hillsborough Arts Council began as an all-volunteer organization dedicated to supporting artists and expanding access to the arts in Hillsborough. The organization has since grown to include a professional staff supported by a Board of Directors, volunteers, artists, and community partners.

The Hillsborough Arts Council's mission is to advocate for local artists and provide access to inclusive community arts programming in Hillsborough, North Carolina. Its stated vision is to integrate art into the lives of community members and cultivate Hillsborough as a cultural hub.

== Programs ==
The Hillsborough Arts Council presents year-round programs supporting artists and community participation in the arts.

Programs include the HAC Gallery & Gift Shop, which represents more than 70 local artists, and Last Fridays & the Art Walk, a recurring downtown arts program that includes the Live on the Lawn Performance Series, Makers Market, and Creation Station.

The organization also presents the annual Solstice Lantern Walk & Market, a community celebration featuring a handmade lantern procession, live music, food vendors, and local artists.

The biennial Hillsborough Handmade Parade features giant puppets, handmade costumes, music, and community performance through downtown Hillsborough.

Additional programs include administration of the Hillsborough Poet Laureate Program for the Town of Hillsborough, artist workshops focused on lantern making and puppetry, the House Concert Series, and ArtCycle, an art supply donation program developed in partnership with Orange County Schools.

== Hillsborough Handmade Parade ==
The Hillsborough Handmade Parade was founded by artist Tinka Jordy in 2007 during her tenure as chair of the Hillsborough Arts Council. In the spring of 2008, a series of public and private workshops led to the first Handmade Parade in October 2008.

The event is designed as a community arts procession featuring large-scale handmade puppets, costumes, music, and performance.

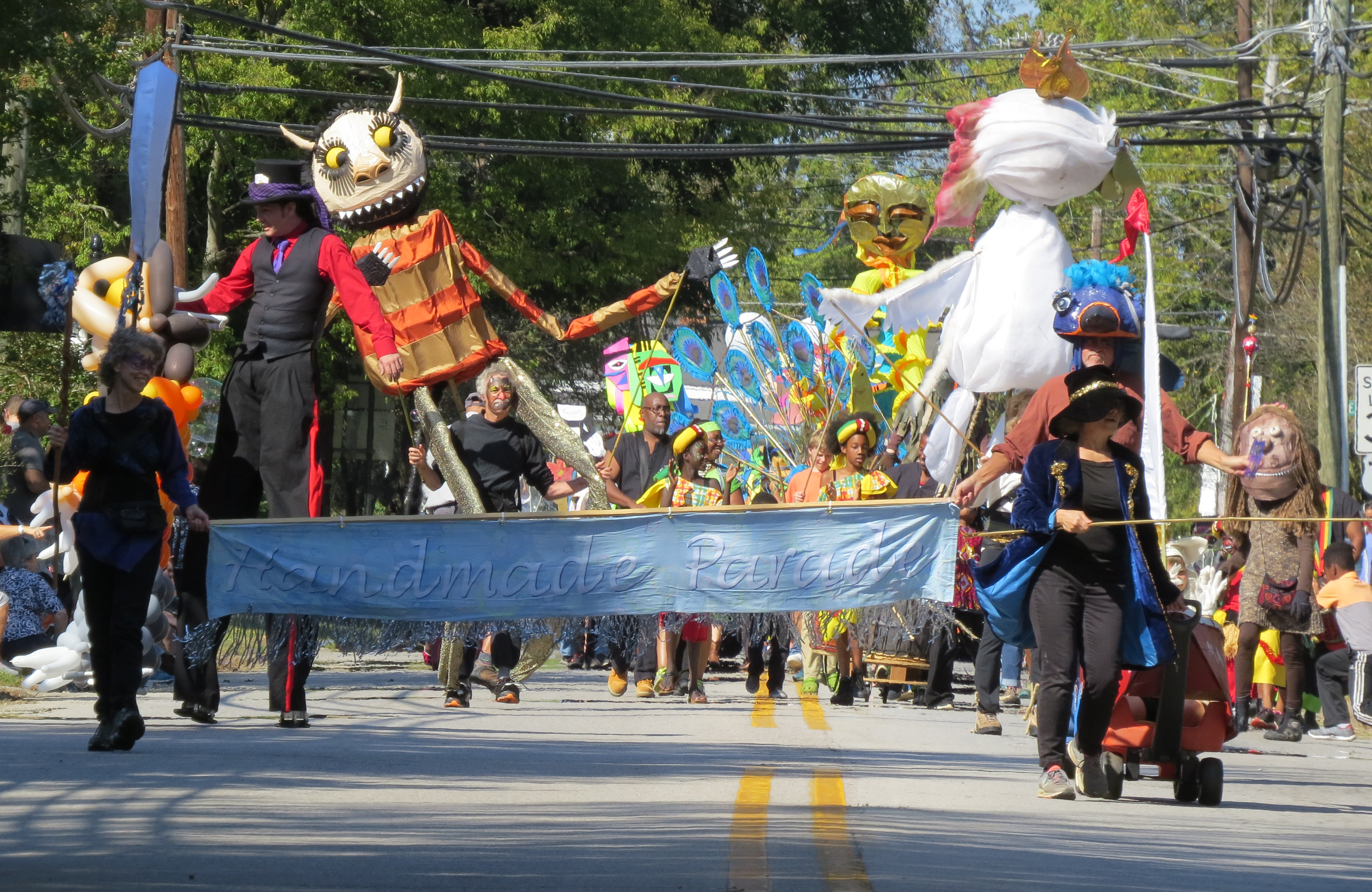
Hillsborough Handmade Parade c. 2016

== Last Fridays and Art Walk ==
The Hillsborough community event Last Fridays was founded by members of the Hillsborough Arts Council in 1998.

The program has developed into a recurring downtown arts event incorporating visual art, live performances, artist vendors, family activities, and partnerships with local businesses and community organizations.

== HAC Gallery & Gift Shop ==
The Hillsborough Arts Council operates the HAC Gallery & Gift Shop, which provides exhibition and sales opportunities for local and regional artists.

The gallery represents more than 70 artists working across a range of media. Exhibitions, artist features, and retail sales support participating artists through commissions and public exposure.

== Community impact ==
The Hillsborough Arts Council supports the cultural and economic activity of Hillsborough through arts programming, artist commissions, public events, and partnerships with local businesses. The organization publishes annual impact reports documenting its programming, participation, artist support, and economic activity.

According to figures reported by the organization, its events generate approximately $723,000 in household income annually. Approximately $67,000 per year in Gallery & Gift Shop commissions goes directly to participating artists. The organization also provides economic opportunities for approximately 132 Makers Market vendors annually and pays approximately $19,250 per year to local performing and teaching artists.

The organization reports approximately 31,500 participants at its events annually, including approximately 21,900 visitors from outside Hillsborough, and partnerships with more than 40 local businesses.

== Relationship with other arts organizations ==
The Hillsborough Arts Council serves as a town-level arts organization for Hillsborough, focusing primarily on community arts programming, artist advocacy, exhibitions, and public events.

The Orange County Arts Commission serves Orange County more broadly through grant administration, artist support programs, workshops, educational initiatives, and operation of the Eno Arts Mill in West Hillsborough.

The organizations have distinct roles and collaborate on initiatives intended to expand access to arts and cultural programming throughout Orange County.

== Board of directors ==
=== Executive Committee ===
- Julia Workman — Chair
- Jeff Berst — Vice Chair
- Florence Smith — Treasurer
- John Claude Bemis — Secretary

=== Directors ===
- Brandon Durham
- Jen Stone
- Karyn Miller
- Kim Kaltenbrun
- Kip Kelly
- Laura Juel
- Mitzi Choate
- Monica Meyer
- Rachel Smith
- Stephanie Wear
- Teresa Keever
- Grace Doane — 2026 Student Board Member, Duke University Sanford School of Public Policy

== Staff ==
The Hillsborough Arts Council is led by a professional staff responsible for organizational leadership, programming, fundraising, gallery operations, marketing, and administration.

- Heather Tatreau — Executive Director
- Cristian Padilla — Events Coordinator
- Kayleigh Overton — Marketing Coordinator
- Kim Freeman — Gallery & Gift Shop Manager
- Gail Greene — Bookkeeper
