= YoloArts =

YoloArts (formerly known as the Yolo County Arts Council) is a non-profit organization, founded in 1981 as a recommendation of the Yolo County Cultural Plan to further the arts and culture of the county.

YoloArts mission is to cultivate and advocate support for all the arts, to participate in advancement of arts education in ours schools and community, and to foster communication among artists, business, education, government, and the residents of Yolo County.

== Programs ==
YoloArts is known for its Arts Education and Outreach Programs which include Artists in Schools, ArtMix, Blues in YoloSchools, the Art & Ag Project, Art in Public Places, Artists Workshops, YoloArts Musical Tour and Exhibitions at Gallery 625.

== Recognition ==
In 2012, National Endowment for the Arts chairman Rocco Landesman visited YoloArts to learn more about their Art & Ag Project which has local Yolo County Artists interacting with local farmers at their farms to create artwork.

The artists get regular, and safe, access to the landscapes they wish to paint or photograph. Farmers, in turn, benefit as well, with often publicly displayed art showcasing their land.

“This program has reminded people that the countryside is beautiful and the farmland is beautiful and if we don’t pay attention, it could be gone,” said Esparto resident Claire Haag, whose marriage is an art and ag project in itself — she’s a painter and her husband, James, is a walnut grower. Locally, the Art and Ag Project is celebrated every fall with an Art Farm Exhibition Gala that features an Art Harvest and Taste of Yolo. There farmers can often be found bidding on the artwork depicting their own land and homes.
