= California Arts Council =

California state government agency

State agency overview
- Jurisdiction: State of California
- Headquarters: Sacramento, California USA
- Employees: 22
- Annual budget: $27,700,000 (2017-18)
- State agency executives: Danielle Brazell, Director; Roxanne Messina Captor, Council Chair; Leah Goodwin, Council Vice Chair
- Website: arts.ca.gov

The California Arts Council is a California state agency headquartered in Sacramento, California. Its board comprises eight council members who receive appointments from both the governor and the California State Legislature. The agency's objective is to promote the advancement of California's cultural landscape through arts, culture, and creativity.

== History ==
The California Arts Council was founded in 1976 under the administration of Governor Jerry Brown. Its establishment led to the dissolution of the previous 15-member California Arts Commission, which had been operational since 1963. Under Governor Brown's administration, Eloise Pickard Smith was appointed as the inaugural director of the Council. During her tenure, Smith initiated the establishment of Arts in Corrections, a program that remains operational within the Council as of 2022.

The California Arts Council comprises members and staff with diverse backgrounds, including the arts, creative industries, arts education, community development, state and local government, as well as the nonprofit and for-profit sectors of California's economy. As a state agency, its mandate involves fostering public engagement with the arts in the state, cultivating arts organizations locally, supporting the professional growth of arts leaders, advocating for the significance of the arts, and providing direct funding for arts programs benefiting California residents. Additionally, the California Arts Council aids in identifying artists and artists' estates entitled to royalties under California's Resale Royalty Act (California Civil Code Section 986), and administers the distribution of these royalties to eligible recipients. In 2012, the Resale Royalty Act was ruled unconstitutional. On July 6, 2018, a panel of the Ninth Circuit ruled that California’s Resale Royalties Act applies only to art sales conducted prior to 1978.

== Budget ==
The California Arts Council reached its highest budget allocation of $32 million during the fiscal year 2000-2001. Amid the budget crisis of 2003-2004, the California Arts Council experienced a significant reduction in its funding, losing 94% of its financial support from the state legislature. Consequently, the arts council had to implement substantial cuts to its programs and staff. Presently, California ranks 37th in state arts funding per capita, allocating 46 cents for every resident towards supporting the arts. The California Arts Council benefits from two revenue streams that are independent of tax allocations: the Arts License Plate and voluntary contributions. Both are recognized by the Franchise Tax Board as tax-deductible charitable donations to the California Arts Council. In the fiscal year 2017-18, the Arts Council received a permanent budget augmentation of $6.8 million. Additionally, there was a $750,000 ongoing allocation to directly enhance arts programming in California's juvenile justice system and a supplementary $2 million increased allocation for California's Arts in Corrections program.

== Arts license plate ==
In 1994, under special legislation, the California Arts Council and the California Department of Motor Vehicles launched the first license plate in the United States dedicated to supporting the arts. The plate features the artwork "Coastline," created by California artist Wayne Thiebaud. While Thiebaud retains copyright to the image, he authorized its use by the California Arts Council for the production of the Arts License Plate. This specialty plate is accessible to California car owners and contributes to funding arts education and local arts initiatives.

== Voluntary tax contribution (Keep Arts in Schools Fund) ==
In 2010, Senator Curren Price introduced SB 1076, which was subsequently signed into law by Governor Arnold Schwarzenegger. This legislation included the California Arts Council in the "Voluntary Contribution" section of the state tax form for both 2010 and 2011. Taxpayers could opt to contribute to the "Arts Council Fund" by specifying the desired amount, with contributions being tax-deductible starting from $1. However, this option was eliminated for 2012 due to the Arts Council Fund falling short of the $250,000 goal outlined in the enabling legislation.

In 2013, Price, who was then serving as Chair of the Joint Committee on the Arts, authored SB 571, which was passed by the legislature. After Price was elected to the Los Angeles City Council in early 2013, Senator Carol Liu took over authorship of the bill. Governor Jerry Brown signed it into law in September 2013. The bill reinstated the California Arts Council to the voluntary contribution portion of California tax return forms, now designated as the "Keep Arts in Schools Fund," which debuted on California tax returns in 2014. During the California Arts Council's 2016-2017 fiscal year, the Keep Arts in Schools Fund generated $250,000 in revenue.
