= Gabrielle Bertrand (politician) =

Canadian politician (1923–1999)

Member of Parliament for Brome—Missisquoi
- In office September 4, 1984 – October 24, 1993
- Preceded by: Riding created
- Succeeded by: Gaston Péloquin

Personal details
- Born: May 15, 1923 Sweetsburg, Quebec, Canada
- Died: September 10, 1999 (aged 76)
- Party: Progressive Conservative
- Spouse: Jean-Jacques Bertrand (m. 1944; died 1973)

Gabrielle Bertrand (May 15, 1923 – September 10, 1999) was a Canadian politician.

Born Gabrielle Giroux in Sweetsburg, Quebec (now Cowansville), the daughter of Louis-Arthur Giroux and Juliette Bolduc, she married Jean-Jacques Bertrand in 1944, the future Union Nationale Premier of Quebec from 1968 to 1970. She was the mother of Jean-François Bertrand, a Quebec cabinet minister in the cabinet of René Lévesque.

In the 1984 election, she was elected to the House of Commons of Canada in the riding of Brome—Missisquoi. A Progressive Conservative, she was re-elected in the 1988 election. From 1984 to 1986, she was the Parliamentary Secretary to the Minister of National Health and Welfare. From 1986 to 1987, she was the Parliamentary Secretary to the Minister of Consumer and Corporate Affairs.

The Bibliothèque Gabrielle-Giroux-Bertrand in Cowansville is named in her honour.

== Electoral record (partial) ==
1984 Canadian federal election: Brome—Mississquoi
Party	Candidate	Votes	%	±%
Progressive Conservative	Gabrielle Bertrand	21,678	53.07	
Liberal	André Bachand	15,693	38.42	
New Democratic	Gordon J. Hamilton	2,271	5.56	
Parti nationaliste	Yvon Bélair	997	2.44	
Libertarian	David Chamberlain	116	0.28	
Commonwealth of Canada	Michel Boissonnault	96	0.24	
Total valid votes		40,851	100.00	
Total rejected ballots		400		
Turnout		41,251	68.45	
Electors on the lists		60,264		
