= Kruschel =

Kruschel is a surname. Notable people with the surname include:

- Albert Kruschel (1889–1959), American cyclist
- Karsten Kruschel (born 1959), German writer
- Linda Kruschel (fl. 1993), Canadian political candidate
