= Jean-Jacques Bertrand =

Premier of Quebec from 1968 to 1970

21st Premier of Quebec
- In office October 2, 1968 – May 12, 1970
- Monarch: Elizabeth II
- Lieutenant Governor: Hugues Lapointe
- Deputy: Jean-Guy Cardinal
- Preceded by: Daniel Johnson Sr.
- Succeeded by: Robert Bourassa

Deputy Premier of Quebec
- In office June 16, 1966 – September 26, 1968
- Premier: Daniel Johnson Sr.
- Preceded by: Paul Gérin-Lajoie
- Succeeded by: Jean-Guy Cardinal (1968)

MNA for Missisquoi
- In office July 28, 1948 – February 22, 1973
- Preceded by: Henri Gosselin
- Succeeded by: Glendon Pettes Brown

Personal details
- Born: June 20, 1916 Sainte-Agathe-des-Monts, Quebec, Canada
- Died: February 22, 1973 (aged 56) Montreal, Quebec, Canada
- Party: Union Nationale
- Spouse: Gabrielle Bertrand (m. 1944)
- Profession: Lawyer

Jean-Jacques Bertrand (French pronunciation: [ʒɑ̃ ʒɑk bɛʁtʁɑ̃]; June 20, 1916 – February 22, 1973) was a Canadian politician and lawyer who served as the 21st premier of Quebec, from October 2, 1968, to May 12, 1970. He led the Union Nationale party.

== Member of the legislature ==
Bertrand served as Member of the Legislative Assembly for the District of Missisquoi from 1948 until his death in 1973.

== Member of the Cabinet ==
He served as Minister of Lands and Forestry from 1958 to 1960 and briefly as Minister of Youth and Social Welfare until his party, the Union Nationale lost the provincial election in 1960.

Bertrand tried to become leader of the Union Nationale in 1961, but was defeated by his colleague Daniel Johnson, Sr., the MLA for the district of Bagot.

In 1966, the Union Nationale was put back in office and Premier Daniel Johnson, Sr. appointed Bertrand to his Cabinet. Bertrand served both as Education Minister until 1967 and Minister of Justice until Johnson's sudden death from a heart attack in 1968. In addition to those assignments, Bertrand was also Johnson's Deputy Premier.

== Premier of Quebec ==
Bertrand was chosen interim Party Leader until a leadership convention could be held and therefore became Premier of Quebec.

His victory (58% of the delegates) over colleague Jean-Guy Cardinal (41%), Minister of Education and newly elected MLA for the district of Bagot, at the Leadership Convention of 1969, caused a deep division among party insiders. While Johnson had been more accommodating towards the more nationalist elements of the party, Bertrand clearly positioned himself as a federalist. Cardinal was considered the nationalist candidate in the race. His defeat prompted a number of supporters to leave the Union Nationale and join the Parti Québécois.

The Union Nationale was also weakened by the passage of a controversial language legislation in 1969, known as Bill 63. Meant to resolve a conflict that plagued the public school board of Saint-Léonard, the bill confirmed the status quo on the language of instruction in the public schools (parents can choose English or French) and angered Quebec nationalists. Two Union Nationale MLAs, Jérôme Proulx and Antonio Flamand crossed the floor and sat as Independents, along with Parti Québécois Leader René Lévesque and Liberal dissident Yves Michaud to protest against the new law.

The Bill 63 would be superseded by Robert Bourassa's Bill 22 in 1974 and René Lévesque's Bill 101 in 1977.

The less controversial accomplishments of the Bertrand administration include the abolition of the Legislative Council of Quebec, the provincial equivalent of the Canadian Senate. Since then, the Legislative Assembly of Quebec is known as the National Assembly of Quebec.

== Leader of the Official Opposition ==
The Union Nationale lost the 1970 election to Robert Bourassa's Liberals. While the party managed to obtain the status of Official Opposition, it finished third in the popular vote behind the PQ. The UN never significantly recovered from that defeat and no longer exists as a political party.

A year later, Bertrand resigned as Leader of the Union Nationale. In 1971, he received an honorary doctorate from Sir George Williams University, which later became Concordia University. He died a few months before the 1973 election.

== Personal life ==
His son, Jean-François Bertrand, was the Member of the National Assembly for the district of Vanier from 1976 to 1985 and a Cabinet Member of René Lévesque's Parti Québécois government. Bertrand's widow Gabrielle served as Progressive Conservative Member of Parliament for the district of Brome—Missisquoi from 1984 to 1993.

== See also ==
- Politics of Quebec
- List of Quebec general elections
- Timeline of Quebec history

Government offices
Preceded by Paul Gérin-Lajoie (Liberal)	Minister of Education (Quebec); 1966–1967	Succeeded by Jean-Guy Cardinal (UN)
Party political offices
Preceded by Daniel Johnson, Sr.	Leader of the Union Nationale; 1968–1971	Succeeded by Gabriel Loubier
Political offices
Preceded by Robert Bourassa (Liberal)	Leader of the Opposition in Quebec; 1970–1971	Succeeded by Gabriel Loubier (UN)
