= Peter Cowan (postmaster) =

- Born: 1815; Scotland
- Died: May 18, 1880 (aged 64–65); Cowansville, Quebec, Canada
- Occupations: Merchant, postmaster, sheriff
- Spouse: Jane Elizabeth Hackett
- Children: 3, including Peter Cowan Jr.

Peter Cowan (born 1815 in Scotland) was a Montreal merchant, postmaster, and sheriff.

== Biography ==
He and his brother Andrew settled in Nelsonville (later Cowansville) in 1836. Peter already knew the area well, having visited often before to practice sport fishing. He was therefore well aware of its potential.

In 1839, he built a general store and, on 6 February 1841, opened the first post office. He served as postmaster until 1861, and to prevent mail from being mistakenly sent to Nelson County (now Burlington, Ontario), he had the post office renamed Cowansville, which became the town's official name.

Peter Cowan held several roles over his lifetime. He served as clerk of the Circuit Court for 16 years. Around 1855, he became the new owner of Freligh Mill and installed its first turbine. Appointed sheriff of the Bedford judicial district in 1864, he held the position until his death. He also contributed to the construction of several buildings in Cowansville.

In addition to his many civilian roles, he also pursued a military career. Captain of a volunteer company he formed in 1837, he became adjutant of the 2nd Battalion of the Missisquoi Militia in 1847.

Peter Cowan was among the first families established in the region, alongside the Kathan, Ruiter, Sweet, Church, and Shufelt families. Before any churches were built, he marked community life by raising a flag every Sunday to signal the sanctity of the day.

Peter Cowan also played an important role in the development of local religious institutions. In 1854, he was among the chief promoters of the construction of an Anglican church alongside Gardner Sweet. Disagreements over the location of the place of worship ultimately led, with the approval of the Bishop of Montreal, to the construction of two separate churches.

== Personal life ==
Peter Cowan was married to Jane Elizabeth Hackett, and they had three children, including a son, Peter Cowan Jr. Peter Cowan died in Cowansville on May 18, 1880, at the age of 64.

== Legacy ==
The town of Cowansville, Quebec, is named after him. Also, since 1994, the Peter Cowan Bridge in Cowansville has borne his name.

== See also ==
- Cowansville
- Scottish Canadians
