= Louis Gosselin =

Canadian politician

Member of Parliament for Brome—Missisquoi
- In office October 1935 – January 1940
- Preceded by: Follin Horace Pickel
- Succeeded by: Maurice Hallé

Personal details
- Born: 1 October 1879 Saint-Alexandre-d'Iberville, Quebec
- Died: 18 June 1954 (aged 74) St. Jean, Quebec
- Party: Liberal
- Profession: farmer, lawyer

Louis Gosselin (1 October 1879 – 18 June 1954) was a Liberal party member of the House of Commons of Canada. He was born in Saint-Alexandre-d'Iberville, Quebec and became a farmer and lawyer.

Gosselin attended College Sainte-Marie then McGill University, University College London and Collège de la Sorbonne in Paris. He was mayor of Notre-Dame-de-Stanbridge, Quebec at one time.

He was first elected to Parliament at the Brome—Missisquoi riding in the 1935 general election. After completing one term, the 18th Canadian Parliament, Gosselin left federal politics and did not seek another term in the 1940 election.
