= Maurice Hallé =

Canadian politician (1906-1991)

Member of Parliament for Brome—Missisquoi
- In office 26 March 1940 – 26 June 1949
- Preceded by: Louis Gosselin
- Succeeded by: Henri Gosselin

Personal details
- Born: 26 February 1906 Sherbrooke, Quebec, Canada
- Died: 5 April 1991 (aged 85) Cowansville, Quebec, Canada
- Party: Liberal
- Spouse: Raymonde Rainville
- Profession: Executive Secretary; Farmer

Maurice Hallé (26 February 1906 – 5 April 1991) was a Liberal party member of the House of Commons of Canada. Born in Sherbrooke, Quebec, he was an executive secretary and farmer by career.

Hallé attended Saint-Hyacinthe Seminary, then Université de Montréal. He also served in the military and attained a rank of Lieutenant-Colonel.

He was first elected to Parliament at the Brome—Missisquoi riding in the 1940 general election and re-elected in 1945 federal election. Hallé did not seek re-election in 1949 and left federal politics, but was an unsuccessful candidate at Brome—Missisquoi in the 1958 election.
