= Louis-Arthur Giroux =

Canadian politician

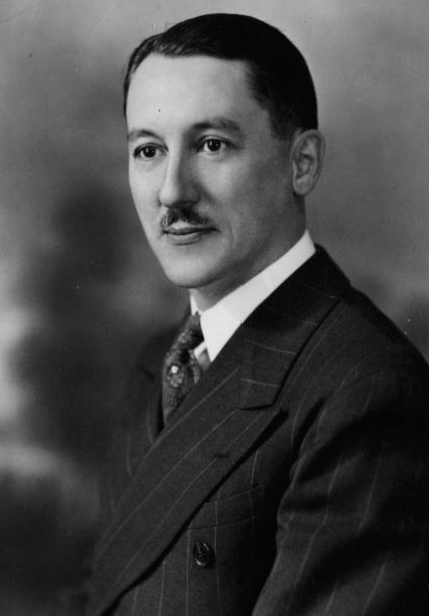

Member of the Legislative Council of Quebec for Wellington
- In office 1937–1945
- Preceded by: William Stephen Bullock
- Succeeded by: Édouard Asselin

Personal details
- Born: 6 April 1893 Farnham, Quebec
- Died: 16 June 1945 (aged 52) Lac-Brome, Quebec
- Party: Union nationale
- Relations: Jean-Jacques Bertrand, son-in-law Jean-François Bertrand, grandson
- Children: Gabrielle Bertrand, Maurice Giroux, Suzanne Turmel, Françoise Giroux, Yvette Giroux, Fernand Giroux

Louis-Arthur Giroux (6 April 1893 – 16 June 1945) was a Canadian politician.

Born in Farnham, Quebec, Giroux was appointed to the Legislative Council of Quebec for Wellington in 1937. A member of the Union nationale, he served until his death in 1945.
