= Henri Gosselin =

Canadian politician (1888–1952)

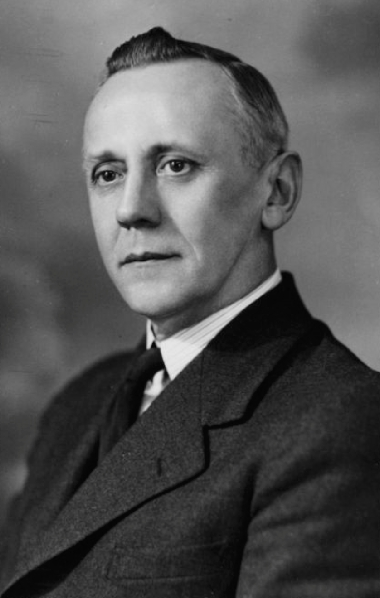

Member of Parliament for Brome—Missisquoi
- In office June 1949 – January 1952
- Preceded by: Maurice Halle
- Succeeded by: Joseph-Léon Deslières

Member of the Legislative Assembly of Quebec for Missisquoi
- In office 1939–1948
- Preceded by: François A. Pouliot
- Succeeded by: Jean-Jacques Bertrand

Personal details
- Born: Henri A. Gosselin; 6 December 1888 Lee, Massachusetts, United States
- Died: 27 January 1952 (aged 63)
- Party: Liberal
- Spouse(s): Alda Beaudry (m. 3 February 1914)
- Profession: farmer, telegrapher, train dispatcher

Henri A. Gosselin (6 December 1888 – 27 January 1952) was a Liberal party member of the House of Commons of Canada. He was born in Lee, Massachusetts, United States and moved to Canada in 1896. He became a farmer, telegrapher and train dispatcher by career.

Gosselin studied at Lawrenceville and at Sherbrooke College in Quebec. From 1924 to 1927, he was a municipal councillor for Farnham, Quebec and was mayor of Lawrenceville in 1927. He was Farnham's mayor from 1932 to 1938.

In the 1939 Quebec election, Gosselin was elected to the Legislative Assembly of Quebec in the Missisquoi riding as a Quebec Liberal Party member, and re-elected for a second term there in 1944. He was defeated in the 1948 election by Jean-Jacques Bertrand of the Union Nationale party.

Gosselin was first elected to federal Parliament at the Brome—Missisquoi riding in the 1949 election. Before completing his first federal term, the 21st Canadian Parliament, Gosselin died on 27 January 1952.
