= André Bachand =

André Bachand may refer to:

- André Bachand (Progressive Conservative MP) (born 1961), Canadian Member of Parliament who represented Richmond—Arthabaska from 1997 to 2004
- André Bachand (Liberal MP) (born 1934), Canadian Member of Parliament who represented Missisquoi from 1980 to 1984
