= Steve Charbonneau =

Canadian football player (born 1973)

Profile
- Position: Defensive tackle

Personal information
- Born: May 30, 1973 (age 53); Cowansville, Quebec, Canada
- Listed height: 6 ft 4 in (1.93 m)
- Listed weight: 295 lb (134 kg)

Career information
- College: New Hampshire

Career history
- 1997–2001: Montreal Alouettes
- 2002–2006: Edmonton Eskimos
- 2007: Montreal Alouettes

Awards and highlights
- Grey Cup champion (2003, 2005)

Steve Charbonneau (born May 30, 1973) is a former Canadian Football League defensive tackle who played eleven seasons for two teams.

Charbonneau ran in the 2025 Canadian federal election for the riding of Brome—Missisquoi, representing the Conservative Party of Canada, but lost. At the time of the 2025 Canadian federal election, he lived in Bolton-Ouest.

== Electoral record ==
2025 Canadian federal election: Brome—Missisquoi
Party	Candidate	Votes	%	±%	Expenditures
Liberal	Louis Villeneuve	34,727	48.26	+13.31	$63,899.89
Bloc Québécois	Jeff Boudreault	20,182	28.05	–6.59	$40,166.16
Conservative	Steve Charbonneau	13,743	19.10	+2.90	$83,948.48
New Democratic	Zoé Larose	1,600	2.22	–4.00	$0.00
Green	Michelle Corcos	1,139	1.58	–0.80	$0.00
People's	Jack McLeod	561	0.78	–2.44	$560.00
Total valid votes/expense limit		71,952	98.78	+0.56	$145,183.34
Total rejected ballots		888	1.22	–0.56	
Turnout		72,840	72.46	+6.39	
Eligible voters (Note: Number of eligible voters does not include election day registrations.)		100,527			
Liberal hold		Swing		+9.95	
Source: Elections Canada
