= Jean-Guy Cardinal =

Canadian politician

Deputy Premier of Quebec
- In office 1968–1970
- Premier: Jean-Jacques Bertrand
- Preceded by: Jean-Jacques Bertrand (1968)
- Succeeded by: Pierre Laporte

Member of the Legislative Council of Quebec for Rougemont
- In office 1967–1968
- Preceded by: Albiny Paquette
- Succeeded by: Institution abolished

Member of the National Assembly of Quebec for Bagot
- In office 1968–1973
- Preceded by: Daniel Johnson, Sr.
- Succeeded by: Jean-Claude Boutin

Member of the National Assembly of Quebec for Prévost
- In office 1976–1979
- Preceded by: Bernard Parent
- Succeeded by: Solange Chaput-Rolland

Personal details
- Born: March 10, 1925 Montreal, Quebec
- Died: March 16, 1979 (aged 54) Quebec City, Quebec

Jean-Guy Cardinal (March 10, 1925 – March 16, 1979) was Deputy Premier of Quebec, Canada.

== Early life ==
He was born on March 10, 1925, in Montreal, Quebec.

== Union Nationale ==
Cardinal was a supporter of the Union Nationale. He was appointed to the Legislative Council of Quebec and to Daniel Johnson Sr.'s Cabinet in 1967 when became Minister of Education; in 1968, he became Deputy Premier.

Less than a year later, Premier Johnson died. Cardinal won a by-election and took over Johnson's seat to the National Assembly of Quebec. However, he lost his bid to become his party's leader against Jean-Jacques Bertrand on June 21, 1969.

Cardinal won re-election to the legislature in 1970, but did not run for re-election in 1973.

== Parti Québécois ==
In the subsequent years, Cardinal joined the Parti Québécois and was joined by many of his former colleagues from the Union Nationale such as Antonio Flamand, Raynald Fréchette and Jérôme Proulx. In 1976, he was returned to the legislature as the MNA for the district of Prévost and became Deputy Speaker of the National Assembly.

== Death ==
He died in office on March 16, 1979.
