= Abolitionist Party of Canada candidates in the 1993 Canadian federal election =

The Abolitionist Party of Canada ran 80 candidates, one more than the Greens, in the 1993 federal election, none of whom were elected. Information on these candidates may be found here.

== Quebec ==
=== Brome—Missisquoi: Jean-Guy Péloquin ===
Jean-Guy Péloquin ran for the National Assembly of Quebec in the 1981 and 1989 provincial elections, the first time as a Union Nationale candidate and the second time as a candidate of Parti 51, a small group that promoted the annexation of Quebec into the United States of America. He finished well behind Liberal incumbent Pierre Paradis on both occasions.

Peloquin was named as the interim leader of Parti 51 in February 1990, succeeding Andre Perron. Speaking to the party's executive after his selection, Peloquin said that the cohabitation of English and French cultures in Canada was no longer possible, but that Quebec independence would only result in a brain drain to the United States and sanctions from the rest of Canada. He also hoped the Meech Lake Accord on constitutional change would fail so that more Quebecers would consider his party's annexationist position. A newspaper report from the period lists Peloquin as fifty-eight years old and serving as a town councillor in Eastman. Shortly after this time, Parti 51 was officially dissolved when it could not find enough members to fill its executive.

Peloquin ran for the Abolitionist Party in the 1993 Canadian federal election.

Electoral record
Election	Division	Party	Votes	%	Place	Winner
1981 provincial	Brome—Missisquoi	Union Nationale	1,178	4.66	3/4	Pierre Paradis, Liberal
1989 provincial	Brome—Missisquoi	Parti 51	269	1.09	5/7	Pierre Paradis, Liberal
1993 federal	Brome—Missisquoi	Abolitionist	722	1.65	4/8	Gaston Péloquin, Bloc Québécois

Sources: Official results, Government of Quebec, 1981 and 1989; Twenty-fifth General Election, 1993: Official Voting Results, Published by the Chief Electoral Officer of Canada.

== Ontario ==
=== Eglinton—Lawrence: Linda Kruschel ===
Kruschel described herself as a homemaker. She did not campaign actively, and acknowledged that she was unfamiliar with the policies of the Abolitionist Party. When asked why she was running for office, Kruschel responded, "I don't know, to be honest with you". She received 124 votes (0.31%), finishing seventh against Liberal incumbent Joseph Volpe.

=== Nickel Belt: Cindy A. Burton ===
Cindy A. Burton described herself as a student. She received 53 votes (0.12%), finishing eighth against Liberal candidate Ray Bonin.

=== Parkdale—High Park: Thomas Earl Pennington ===
A resident of Toronto, Pennington was unemployed at the time of the election and did not campaign actively. He called for a reform of Canada's monetary system, and the creation of local currencies and employment/bartering exchanges (Toronto Star, 22 October 1993). He received 60 votes (0.15%), finishing tenth against Liberal incumbent Jesse Flis.

=== Parry Sound-Muskoka: Jim Journeau ===
Jim Journeau identified as a carpenter. He received 26 votes (0.06%), finishing eighth against Liberal candidate Andy Mitchell.

=== St. Catharines: Kevin Doucet ===
Doucet was unemployed at the time of the election. He received 86 votes (0.18%), finishing sixth against Liberal candidate Walt Lastewka.

=== St. Paul's: Marion Velma Joyce ===
Joyce was a telemarketer and student, and did not campaign actively during the election (Toronto Star, 22 October 1993). She received 17 votes (0.03%), finishing eleventh against Liberal candidate Barry Campbell. She should not be confused with a different Marion Joyce, who was murdered in Kingston, Ontario in 2002.

=== Scarborough Southwest: Alfred Morton ===
Morton was listed as a mechanical engineering draftsman. He called for the creation of a social system under which "the poor get rich, the rich get richer and no one will be able to take advantage of anyone else" (Toronto Star, 22 October 1993). He received 40 votes (0.10%), finishing eighth against Liberal incumbent Tom Wappel.

=== Sudbury: Richard Lionel Gouin ===
Gouin listed himself as a bookbinder. He received 86 votes (0.20%), finishing ninth against Liberal incumbent Diane Marleau.
