= Heward Grafftey =

Canadian politician

The Honourable Heward Grafftey PC QC

Member of Parliament for Brome—Missisquoi
- In office October 30, 1972 – February 17, 1980
- Preceded by: Yves Forest
- Succeeded by: André Bachand
- In office March 31, 1958 – June 24, 1968
- Preceded by: Joseph-Léon Deslières
- Succeeded by: Yves Forest

Personal details
- Born: William Heward Grafftey; August 5, 1928 Montreal, Quebec, Canada
- Died: February 11, 2010 (aged 81) Montreal, Quebec, Canada
- Party: Progressive Conservative
- Spouse: Alida Grace Visser
- Children: 3

William Heward Grafftey PC QC (August 5, 1928 – February 11, 2010) was a Canadian politician and businessman.

== Early life ==
Born in Montreal, Quebec, to a wealthy family, he was a nephew of artist Prudence Heward of the Beaver Hall Group, and wrote a chapter about her in the 1996 book Portraits of a Life.

His father, Major Arthur Grafftey, was a First World War hero and board chairman of the Montreal Lumber Company.

Grafftey received a bachelor of arts degree from Mount Allison University, majoring in political science and history, and a bachelor of civil law degree from McGill University. He was admitted to the Bar of Quebec.

== Parliamentary career ==
Grafftey was first elected to the House of Commons of Canada in the 1958 general election that returned John Diefenbaker's Progressive Conservative (PC) Party in a landslide victory. A resident of the Eastern Townships, he was the Member of Parliament (MP) for the riding of Brome—Missisquoi from 1958 to 1968. From 1962 to 1963, Grafftey served as parliamentary secretary to Finance Minister George Nowlan. Due to his relatively short stature and impish looks, Grafftey earned the nickname of "The Gnome from Brome," during his twenty years in politics.

In the 1964 Great Flag Debate, he was one of a handful of Conservative MPs—a group led by his fellow Quebecer Léon Balcer—who broke with leader John Diefenbaker to support the adoption of the Maple Leaf flag. Grafftey sat as a Tory MP until losing his seat when the Liberal Party under Pierre Trudeau won the 1968 election in a landslide. During this period, he called for radical reforms to Canada's housing policies.

Grafftey returned to Parliament in the 1972 election, and was a candidate in the 1976 Progressive Conservative leadership election, in which he placed last on the first ballot, with 33 delegate votes. Like many of the other challengers in the race who were eliminated in the early ballots, Grafftey supported the eventual leadership winner, Joe Clark.

Clark became Prime Minister after winning a minority government in 1979, and Grafftey served as Minister of State for Social Programs and Minister of State for Science and Technology in Clark's short-lived government before losing his seat again in the 1980 election. Grafftey supported Clark in the 1983 PC leadership election, in which the latter lost to Brian Mulroney, and was largely shut out of Quebec PC circles during the Mulroney years.

== Later political career ==
Grafftey attempted to return to Parliament in the 2000 election, but was unsuccessful. After suffering a serious injury which incapacitated him for most of the campaign, he came in third place behind the Bloc Québécois challenger and Liberal incumbent MP Denis Paradis. He did, however, finish with the second highest vote total of any Progressive Conservative candidate in the province of Québec.

In 2002, he was one of the first Progressive Conservatives to call openly for Joe Clark, who had returned as Tory leader in 1998, to resign, offering himself as a replacement. Grafftey eventually ran as a PC leadership candidate in 2003. He ran a campaign that was devoid of defining policy proposals but which focused upon his political experience, his bilingualism and his belief that he could recruit 300,000 new members to help the PCs win the coming election. Although, like most of the candidates in the race, he supported the twin Progressive Conservative pillars of North American free trade and support for decentralizing reforms to the Constitution of Canada, he often found himself in agreement with the left wing of his party, sharing maverick candidate David Orchard's opposition to the 2003 invasion of Iraq.

Grafftey's candidacy received some media attention largely because he was the only candidate in the race who was fluently bilingual (in English and French) and had experience in governing. Yet Grafftey's age (75 at the time) was also mocked by political satirists as an indication of the lack of "new blood" in the PC Party. Grafftey withdrew several days prior to the vote for health reasons. Analysts suggest that Grafftey had 72 committed delegates hailing largely from several Montreal-area ridings. Most of Grafftey's delegates entered the convention as "undeclared delegates". He did not attend the convention, nor did he endorse any other leadership candidate, though many of his rural backers went over to David Orchard.

After the 2003 convention, Grafftey briefly re-entered the political spotlight by joining Orchard and other former Tories in opposition to a proposed merger of the party with the Canadian Alliance. They were unsuccessful, with the Conservative Party of Canada officially forming in 2004. Grafftey still insisted that he was a "Progressive Conservative". He ran in Brome—Missisquoi for the Progressive Canadian Party in the 2006 federal election and came in fifth place with 1,921 votes—4% of the total ballots cast.

== Other interests ==
Grafftey was active in business circles up to his death and was the CEO of SafetySense, which publishes basic safety booklets for businesses and schools.

In 2001, he wrote a book on the state of Canadian politics entitled Democracy Challenged: How to End One-Party Rule in Canada.

== Personal life ==
He has three children: Arthur Heward, Clement Tae Yong, and Leah Yoon Hee. His marriage to Alida Grace Visser ended in divorce. He neither declared nor denied being gay. "I never had to come out, because it was never an issue. I was never in. I was always me," he once said. Grafftey declared his sexual orientation when he disrupted and stormed out of a service at St. George's Anglican Church in Montreal after the priest delivered what he considered a homophobic sermon.

Grafftey died February 11, 2010, at the Royal Victoria Hospital from complications from Parkinson's disease.
