= Farnham, Quebec =

City in Quebec, Canada

Farnham
- City
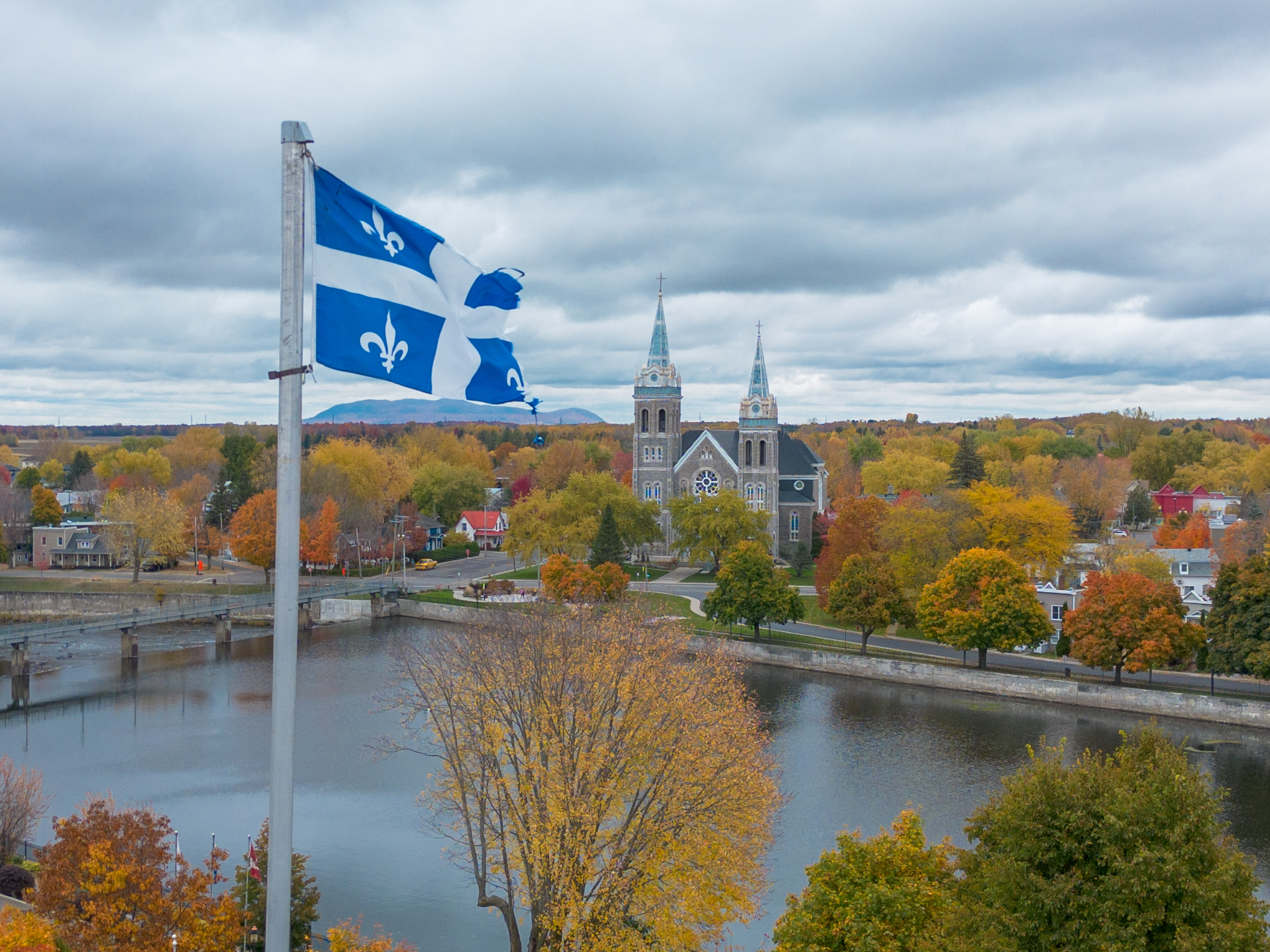
- Farnham in 2025

- Coat of arms

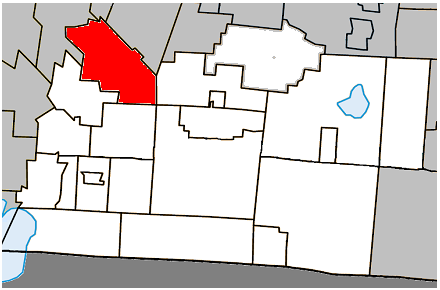
- Location within Brome-Missisquoi RCM

- Location in southern Quebec
- Coordinates: 45°17′N 72°59′W
- Country: Canada
- Province: Quebec
- Region: Estrie
- RCM: Brome-Missisquoi
- Settled: c. 1800
- Village incorporated: January 1, 1862
- Town incorporated: December 28, 1876
- Present city constituted: March 8, 2000

Government
  - Mayor: Patrick Melchior
  - Federal riding: Brome—Missisquoi
  - Prov. riding: Brome-Missisquoi

Area
  - Total: 94.10 km^{2} (36.33 sq mi)
  - Land: 92.12 km^{2} (35.57 sq mi)

Population (2021)
  - Total: 10,149
  - Density: 110.2/km^{2} (285/sq mi)
  - Pop 2016–2021: ▲13.9%
  - Dwellings: 4,697
- Time zone: UTC−5 (EST)
  - Summer (DST): UTC−4 (EDT)
- Postal code(s): J2N
- Area codes: 450 and 579
- Highways: R-104; R-233; R-235
- Geocode: 46112
- People: Farnhamien; Farnhamienne
- Website: ville.farnham.qc.ca

Farnham is a city in the Brome-Missisquoi Regional County Municipality in the Estrie region of Quebec, Canada. It lies on the Yamaska River, near the eastern edge of the Saint Lawrence Lowlands. The city had a population of 10,149 in the 2021 Canadian census.

Permanent Euro-Canadian settlement began around 1800, and the community first developed around water-powered sawmills and flour mills. The arrival of the railway in 1858 changed Farnham into a regional railway and industrial centre. It was the headquarters of the South Eastern Railway and later became an important junction in the Canadian Pacific Railway network. The present municipality was formed in 2000 through the amalgamation of Farnham and the surrounding municipality of Rainville.

== Toponymy ==
Farnham takes its name from the former Township of Farnham, which was proclaimed in 1798. The township was named for Farnham, Surrey, England. The Commission de toponymie du Québec attributes the choice of name to surveyor and landowner Samuel Gale, who came from that area and was associated with the establishment of the township.

The settlement and its first village municipality were known as West Farnham, or Farnham-Ouest. The shorter name was adopted when it became the Town of Farnham in 1876.

== History ==
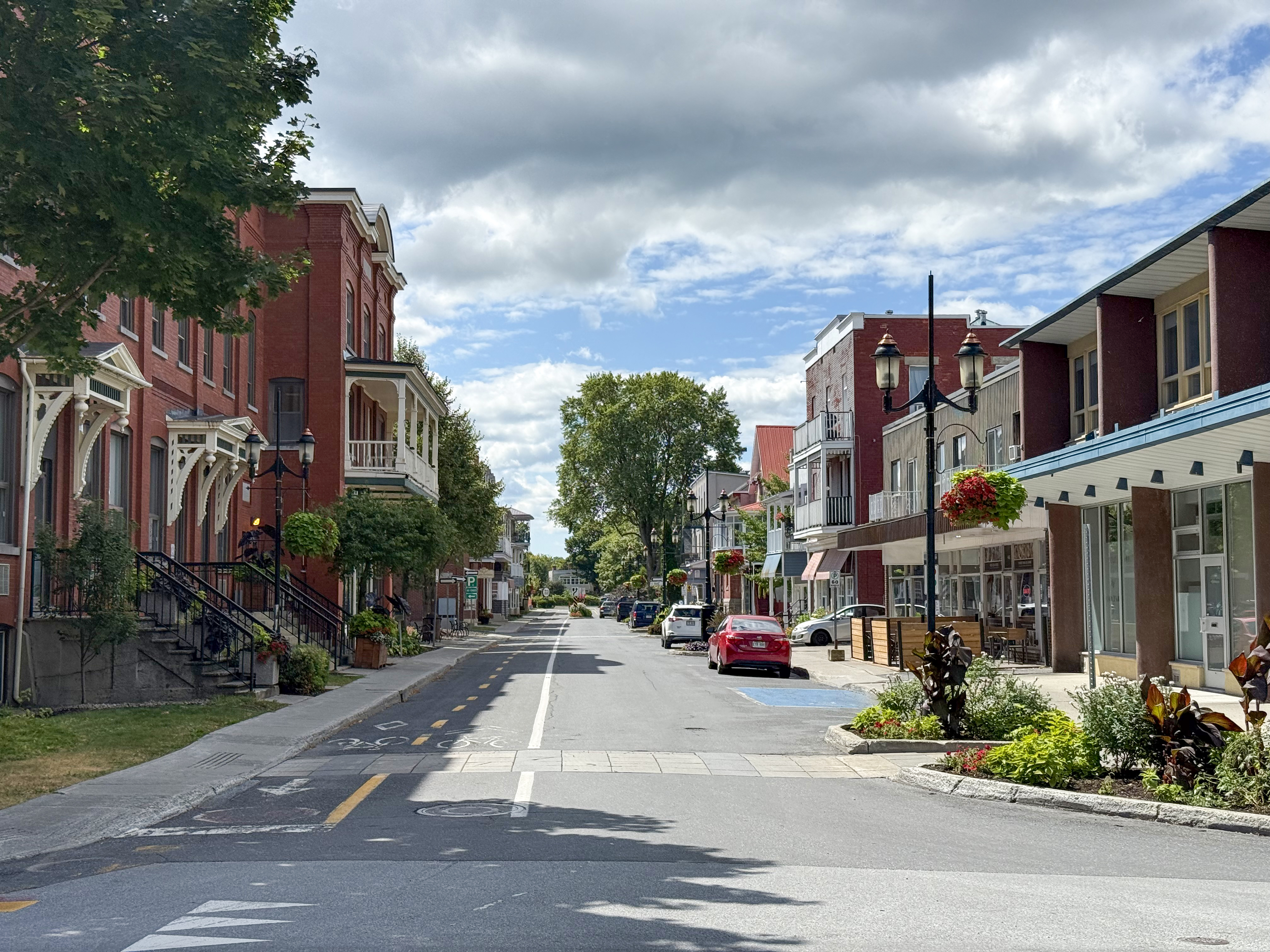
Rue de l’Hôtel-de-Ville

=== Indigenous presence ===
Farnham is within Ndakina, the ancestral territory of the W8banaki Nation. Ndakina extends westward to the Richelieu River.

Archaeological research in Brome-Missisquoi has documented an Indigenous presence in the region extending back about 5,000 years. A five-year survey conducted in the early 1990s identified 18 pre-contact sites, most of them along the Pike River and others in the Yamaska and Missisquoi watersheds. The sites show repeated use of the region for hunting, fishing and travel during the Archaic and Woodland periods, as well as trade with communities to the south in present-day New York. By the end of the 16th century, the area formed part of hunting territory used by Western Abenaki groups.

=== Settlement and municipal development ===
The Township of Farnham was granted in three sections. Concession A, in the east, was granted to Samuel Gale on October 22, 1798. The central concession went to the heirs of Abraham Cuyler on September 9, 1805, and the western concession to George Allsopp on February 11, 1809. Permanent Euro-Canadian settlement began near the end of the 1790s. Many of the first settlers were Loyalists or migrants from the United States.

Whipple Cook, an American from Rhode Island, established a sawmill on the south bank of the Yamaska River in 1817. It stood opposite the later Saint-Romuald church, near present-day Conrad-Blain Park. Other sawmills and flour mills followed, and by the 1820s a small settlement had formed around the river crossing. The West Farnham area had 1,239 inhabitants in 1831. A stagecoach service began passing through the settlement in 1836, and the Farnham post office opened on July 6, 1845.

The first Methodist mission was organized in 1842, and a Wesleyan Methodist church was built in 1844. Anglican services had been held in Cook's Hotel from 1840; the Saint James mission was established in 1847, and its church was erected between 1847 and 1849 on land donated by Colonel James Allsopp. At mid-century, English-speaking Protestants formed most of the local population.

Roman Catholic services were initially held in private homes. A wooden chapel was completed in 1849 after a brick chapel begun that year was destroyed in a storm. The parish of Saint-Romuald was established in 1851.

Louis Bourdon, a former Patriote who had been deported to Australia after the 1838 rebellion, settled in Farnham in 1849 and opened a general store. He helped organize the West Farnham Bridge Company, which built the first bridge across the Yamaska in 1851. Bourdon later served as mayor of the parish municipality and became the first mayor of the village municipality of West Farnham when it was incorporated on January 1, 1862. West Farnham became the Town of Farnham on December 28, 1876. Its legal designation changed to city in 1956 and back to town in 1978.

=== Railway and industrial growth ===
The Stanstead, Shefford and Chambly Railroad opened its first section at Farnham in 1858, and the first train reached the village on January 1, 1859. The line was extended to Granby that November. In 1871, local investors organized the South Eastern Railway to build a line from Farnham to Newport, Vermont. The company placed its headquarters in Farnham and built a station, repair shops, a turntable and a large freight yard. The Farnham–Newport line opened on July 9, 1873.

Rail traffic brought workshops, hotels, stores and new residential districts. By 1882, seven tracks left Farnham and more than 18 passenger trains stopped there each day, in addition to freight traffic. The South Eastern Railway later became part of the Canadian Pacific Railway system, and Farnham remained a junction between east–west and north–south routes.

Mills and the railway were joined by other manufacturers. Industries established in Farnham over time included beet-sugar refining, wood processing, safe manufacturing and textiles. The American textile company Collins & Aikman opened a Canadian plant in Farnham in 1929 to supply the automotive and furniture industries. The plant remained a large local employer until its closure was announced in 2007, eliminating about 350 jobs.

Fires repeatedly altered the centre of the town. The Saint-Romuald church burned in 1901. A 1909 fire damaged businesses near Depot and Main streets, and another during the night of July 30–31, 1911 destroyed the town hall, the Wonderland Theatre, hotels, stores and houses. Firefighters and equipment arrived by rail from Saint-Jean, Sherbrooke and Montreal. The Collège de Farnham burned in 1912 and the hospice in 1916.

The railway station was destroyed by fire during the night of February 8–9, 1949. Canadian Pacific built the present station in 1950 because Farnham still occupied a strategic point in its network. The repair shops, turntable and express and baggage buildings were removed during the 1960s and 1970s. The last scheduled passenger train between Montreal and Farnham ran on October 24, 1980.

Farnham and the municipality of Rainville were amalgamated on March 8, 2000. The new municipality took the name City of Farnham and incorporated both the urban centre and the surrounding rural territory.

=== Military camp ===
On April 4, 1910, the federal government purchased land west of Farnham for a military training ground. Cavalry units trained there beginning in June of that year. The camp was used during the First World War and closed in 1918. From 1919 to 1940, some of its buildings were used by a Dominion experimental farm.

The site reopened on October 16, 1940, as Camp A, later designated Camp No. 40. It first held civilian internees and refugees sent from the United Kingdom. After closing briefly in early 1942, it housed enemy merchant seamen and then German combatant officers, with a smaller number of other ranks serving as orderlies. The camp closed again in June 1943 and reopened in September 1944 as an officers' camp. About 2,800 internees, refugees and prisoners of war passed through Farnham before the installation finally closed in 1946.

The training area remains in military use. Candidates from the Canadian Forces Leadership and Recruit School at CFB Saint-Jean deploy to Farnham for field exercises, including Exercise Vimy near the end of basic training.

== Geography ==
Farnham is built on both banks of the Yamaska River at the eastern edge of the Saint Lawrence Lowlands. The urban centre occupies a river crossing near the boundary between the flat agricultural plain to the west and the more broken terrain of the Eastern Townships. The municipality has a land area of 92.12 km^{2} (35.57 sq mi).

The western part of Brome-Missisquoi, including Farnham, forms part of the Maskoutain plain. Its clay and sand deposits were left by the Champlain Sea after the retreat of the glaciers. Sandy ridges remain near Farnham, including along the corridor followed by Route 235 and Rang Saint-Henri. The open countryside is used mainly for field crops and livestock farming.

The present territory includes the former municipality of Rainville, which surrounded much of the older town before the 2000 amalgamation. Farnham borders Sainte-Brigide-d'Iberville and Saint-Césaire to the north, Ange-Gardien and Brigham to the east, Dunham and Saint-Ignace-de-Stanbridge to the south, and Sainte-Sabine to the southwest.

== Demographics ==
In the 2021 Census of Population, Farnham had a population of 10,149 living in 4,446 of its 4,697 private dwellings. This was an increase of 13.9 per cent from its 2016 population of 8,909. With a land area of 92.12 km^{2} (35.57 sq mi), it had a population density of 110.2/km^{2} (285.3/sq mi) in 2021.

Historical census populations – Farnham, Quebec
Year	Pop.	±%
1991	6,146	—
1996	6,044	−1.7%
2001	7,747	+28.2%
2006	7,809	+0.8%
2011	8,330	+6.7%
2016	8,909	+7.0%
2021	10,149	+13.9%
Sources: Statistics Canada census profiles. The 2001 figure reflects the 2000 amalgamation of Farnham and Rainville.

Canada census – Farnham community profile

	2021	2016	2011
Population	10,149 (+13.9% from 2016)	8,909 (+7.0% from 2011)	8,330 (+6.7% from 2006)
Land area	92.12 km^{2} (35.57 sq mi)	92.26 km^{2} (35.62 sq mi)	92.04 km^{2} (35.54 sq mi)
Population density	110.2/km^{2} (285/sq mi)	96.6/km^{2} (250/sq mi)	90.5/km^{2} (234/sq mi)
Median age	40.4 (M: 40.4, F: 40.8)	42.3 (M: 41.6, F: 43.3)	43.1 (M: 42.3, F: 43.8)
Private dwellings	4,697 (total) 4,446 (occupied)	4,187 (total)	3,852 (total)
Median household income	$68,000	$52,527	$45,674

References: 2021 2016 2011

Canada census mother tongue – Farnham, Quebec
Census	Total	French			English			French and English			Other		
Year	Responses	Count	Trend	Per cent	Count	Trend	Per cent	Count	Trend	Per cent	Count	Trend	Per cent
2021	10,060	9,350	▲13.1%	92.9%	380	▲22.6%	3.8%	180	▲100.0%	1.8%	120	▲20.0%	1.2%
2016	8,790	8,265	▲7.7%	94.0%	310	▼3.1%	3.5%	90	▲5.9%	1.0%	100	▲11.1%	1.1%
2011	8,170	7,675	▲7.3%	93.9%	320	▲14.3%	3.9%	85	▼5.6%	1.0%	90	▼28.0%	1.1%
2006	7,645	7,150	▼0.8%	93.5%	280	▲27.3%	3.7%	90	▼21.7%	1.2%	125	▲177.8%	1.6%
2001	7,585	7,205	▲31.6%	95.0%	220	▼13.7%	2.9%	115	▲27.8%	1.5%	45	▼25.0%	0.6%
1996	5,880	5,475	n/a	93.1%	255	n/a	4.3%	90	n/a	1.5%	60	n/a	1.0%

== Government ==
Farnham is governed by a mayor and six councillors, each representing an electoral district. Patrick Melchior began a third term as mayor following the 2025 municipal election.

Farnham City Council, 2025–2029
Office	Member	District
Mayor	Patrick Melchior	At large
Councillor	Nathalie Dépeault	1 – Robert-C.-Wilkins
Councillor	Daniel Campbell	2 – Aldéi-Martel
Councillor	Joannie Labrecque	3 – Du Docteur-Olivier-Trépanier
Councillor	Claude Benjamin	4 – Du Docteur-Jean-Louis-Cardin
Councillor	Mario Gagné	5 – Esther-Elkin
Councillor	Nadège Katende	6 – Omer-Galipault

== Economy ==
Farnham serves as a commercial and industrial centre for the surrounding agricultural plain. Its position at a railway junction supported freight handling, repair work and manufacturing, while the rural part of the municipality remains closely tied to agriculture.

One large industrial building, the former Beaulieu Canada carpet plant on Boulevard Magenta Est, was later converted for cannabis production. Cannara Biotech received a federal production licence in 2020, and large-scale production began in 2021 in the 625,000-square-foot (58,100 m^{2}) facility.

== Education ==
French-language public schools in Farnham are administered by the Centre de services scolaire du Val-des-Cerfs. The city has three elementary schools—Saint-Jacques, Saint-Romuald and Monseigneur-Douville—and École secondaire Jean-Jacques-Bertrand.

Farnham Elementary School, operated by the Eastern Townships School Board, provides English-language education from pre-kindergarten through Grade 6.

== Built heritage ==
The Saint James Anglican complex stands on the Yamaska River and includes the church, cemetery, former rectory and parish hall. The church, built from 1847 to 1849, is the oldest surviving part of the complex. Its restrained brick design is characteristic of 19th-century Anglican Neoclassical churches. The parish hall dates from 1888 and the rectory from 1892; the hall was cited as a municipal heritage building in 2008.

The present Saint-Romuald Roman Catholic church was constructed between 1903 and 1905 after its predecessor burned in 1901. Designed by Joseph-Ovide Turgeon, it is a stone Romanesque Revival church. Its interior was decorated between 1905 and 1912 and includes works associated with Ozias Leduc and a 1912 Casavant organ. The church, 1930 rectory and 1942 Sacred Heart monument form a municipal heritage site cited in 2007.

The Canadian Pacific station was built in 1950 after the previous station burned. Its flat roofs, horizontal massing and separation of passenger, office and operating spaces are characteristic of the International style. The building was designated a heritage railway station by the federal government in 1995.

Several houses near the old centre are associated with Farnham's 19th-century civic and commercial leaders. The Bourdon house and general store stood at the corner of Yamaska and Saint-Paul streets. The Meigs house, built about 1867, was the home of mill owner, mayor and federal member of Parliament Daniel Bishop Meigs; it survived the 1911 fire and hosted Wilfrid Laurier during a visit that year.

The Centre des arts de Farnham was inaugurated on August 10, 1967. Built as a Canadian Centennial project, it was designed for cultural, recreational and community activities.

== Culture and recreation ==
The Petite Église is a former church converted into a recording studio. Arcade Fire acquired the building in the mid-2000s and recorded most of Neon Bible and parts of The Suburbs there. The group placed it for sale in 2013. Emery Street Records acquired the property the following year, repaired its badly damaged roof and continued to use it as a studio.

The municipal library was named for Louise Hall in 2013. Municipal recreational facilities include the Aréna Madeleine-Auclair, a swimming pool, outdoor skating rinks, sports fields and a skatepark. Farnham is on the Montérégiade cycling route between Farnham and Granby and is connected to Quebec's Route Verte network.

== Transportation ==
Routes 104, 233 and 235 pass through Farnham. Route 104 links the city with Saint-Jean-sur-Richelieu to the west and Cowansville to the southeast. Routes 233 and 235 provide north–south connections across the surrounding agricultural plain.

Farnham remains a railway junction used for freight traffic, although the former Canadian Pacific station no longer handles passengers. Scheduled passenger service ended in 1980.

The city provides local on-demand transportation, adapted transportation for eligible users and an intermunicipal service between Farnham and Cowansville.

== Notable people ==
- H. H. Bennett (1843–1908), photographer
- William Bourque (1878 or 1879–1909), racing driver
- Alain Forand (born 1944), Canadian Army major-general and commander of Land Force Quebec Area
- Louis-Arthur Giroux (1893–1945), lawyer and member of the Legislative Assembly of Quebec
- Ludger Lemieux (1872–1953), architect
- Yvan Ponton (born 1945), actor, sports commentator and television host
- Yves Rodier (born 1967), comics artist known for his pastiches of The Adventures of Tintin

== See also ==
- List of cities in Quebec
- 21st-century municipal history of Quebec
