= Gordon Wallace Scott =

Canadian politician

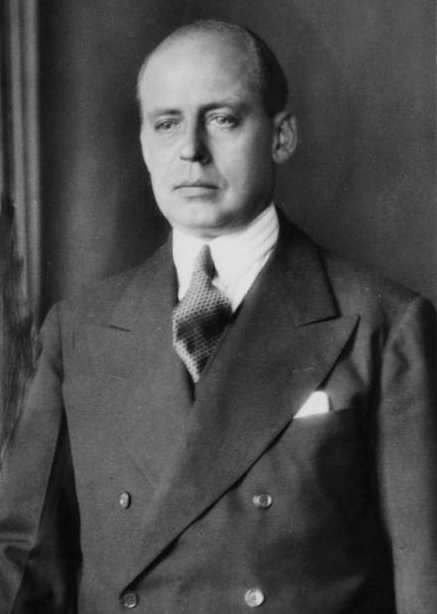

Member of the Legislative Council of Quebec for Wellington
- In office 1930–1931
- Preceded by: William Frederick Vilas
- Succeeded by: William Stephen Bullock

Member of the Legislative Council of Quebec for Victoria
- In office 1932–1940
- Preceded by: Henry Miles
- Succeeded by: George Gordon Hyde

Personal details
- Born: October 1, 1887 Montreal, Quebec
- Died: December 14, 1940 (aged 53) Atlantic Ocean
- Party: Liberal

Gordon Wallace Scott (1 October 1887 – 14 December 1940) was a Canadian politician.

Born in Montreal, Quebec, Scott appointed Treasurer in the cabinet of Louis-Alexandre Taschereau on October 16, 1930. He was the unsuccessful Liberal candidate for the riding of Huntingdon in a by-election held on November 4, 1930, losing to Martin Fisher. He held the role of Treasurer until November 27. He was appointed to the Legislative Council of Quebec for Wellington on November 13, 1930, and was made a minister without portfolio as well. He resigned on August 4, 1931, to run as the Liberal candidate in the riding of Montréal–Saint-Georges in the 1931 election. He was defeated by Charles Ernest Gault and was re-appointed to the Legislative Council on June 17, 1932, for the Victoria division.

He died while in office on December 14, 1940, during the rescue operations carried out in the Atlantic Ocean after the sinking of the steamer Western Prince by the German submarine U-96 during World War II. He was accompanying C. D. Howe to Britain to examine the British war effort and Canada's assistance to it, and was killed trying to climb from the lifeboat to the rescuing ship (Howe survived).
