= Gaston Péloquin =

Canadian politician (1939–1994)

Member of Parliament for Brome—Missisquoi
- In office 25 October 1993 – 1 September 1994
- Preceded by: Gabrielle Bertrand
- Succeeded by: Denis Paradis

Personal details
- Born: 11 December 1939 Granby, Quebec
- Died: 1 September 1994 (aged 54) Quebec

Gaston Péloquin (11 December 1939 – 1 September 1994) was a Canadian politician, who represented the electoral district of Brome—Missisquoi in the House of Commons from 1993 to 1994.

He was born in Granby, Quebec. Péloquin, who was a teacher before entering politics, was elected in the 1993 election as a Bloc Québécois candidate. However, after less than a year in office, he died in a car accident on 1 September 1994, when he crashed his car while driving on a curve near Sutton, Quebec. He was pronounced dead a local hospital, at the age of 54.

Péloquin had a son, whom he adopted from Haiti while working there as a teacher.

In the resulting byelection, he was succeeded by Denis Paradis.

== Electoral record ==
1993 Canadian federal election: Brome—Missisquoi
Party	Candidate	Votes	%	±%	Expenditures
Bloc Québécois	Gaston Péloquin	17,836	40.76		$43,761
Liberal	Joan Kouri	16,040	36.66	–	$50,840
Progressive Conservative	Francine Vincelette	7,504	17.15		$52,076
Abolitionist	Jean-Guy Peloquin	722	1.65		$0
Natural Law	Yves Décarie	563	1.29		$52
New Democratic Party	Sean Hutchinson	553	1.26		$392
Non-Affiliated	Gary Wrightman	380	0.87		$4,817
National	Edmond Séguin	156	0.36		$0
Total valid votes		43,754	100.00		
Total rejected ballots		1,562			
Turnout		45,316	76.64		
Electors on the lists		59,132			
Source: Thirty-fifth General Election, 1993: Official Voting Results, Published by the Chief Electoral Officer of Canada. Financial figures taken from official contributions and expenses provided by Elections Canada.

Parliament of Canada
Preceded by Gabrielle Bertrand	Member of Parliament for Brome—Missisquoi; 1993-1994	Succeeded by Denis Paradis
