= James O'Halloran (politician) =

Canadian politician and lawyer

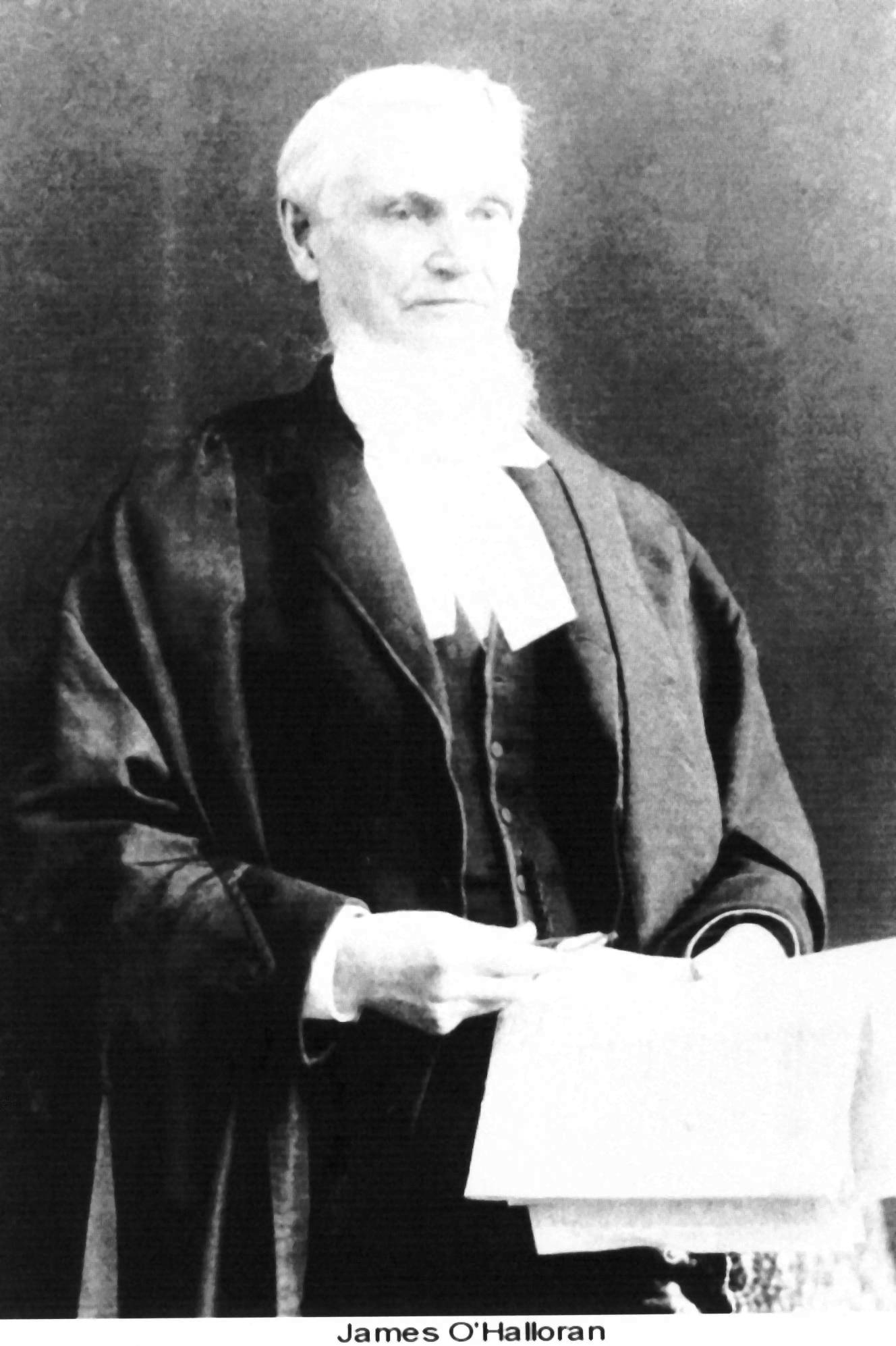
James O'Halloran

James O'Halloran, KC (c.1820 – June 1, 1913) was a Quebec lawyer and political figure. He was born about 1820 (some sources say 1821) near Fermoy, County Cork, Ireland and came to Canada with his family in 1828. He studied at the University of Vermont and served in the U.S. Army during the war with Mexico. He returned to Lower Canada in 1849, was admitted to the bar in 1852 and set up practice in Cowansville. He was elected to the Legislative Assembly of the Province of Canada for Missisquoi as a member of the parti rouge; he was reelected in 1863. He opposed Confederation. O'Halloran was named Queen's Counsel on February 12, 1864.

He helped establish the South Eastern Railway and served as its first president; it was later bought by the Canadian Pacific Railway. O'Halloran then became the lawyer for the Canadian Pacific Railway in Quebec. He served as first mayor of Cowansville in 1876, from 1882 to 1883 and from 1886 to 1891. He died on June 1, 1913, and was buried in the (formerly Methodist) United Church cemetery two days later.

== The Confederation Debates ==
As a member of the Legislative Assembly representing the riding of Missisquoi in the Provincial Parliament of Canada James O'Halloran delivered this speech on March 8, 1865, during the debate on the proposed confederation of the British provinces in North America. The text is taken from the Parliamentary Debates on the Subject of the Confederation of the British North American Provinces, 3rd series, 8th Parliament (Hunter, Rose, & Co., Quebec, 1865), pp. 792–799.

MR. O’HALLORAN—Before proceeding, Mr. Speaker, to offer a few observations on the resolutions in your hands, I may say that if I had any hesitation in pronouncing on the merits of this scheme, I might have taken a preliminary exception to the jurisdiction of this House to pass this measure. You, sir, and I were sent here to make laws, not legislatures. (HEAR, HEAR) We were sent here to work out the Constitution of this country — not to undermine and destroy it. Therefore, if it were my wish to shirk this question, which it is not, I could justify myself by saying it was no part of my mandate, or the compact between me and those who sent me here. When we assume the power to deal with this question, to change the whole system of Government, to effect a revolution, peaceful though it be, without reference to the will of the people of this country, we arrogate to ourselves a right never conferred upon us, and our act is a usurpation. But I rise not for the purpose of discussing this scheme in detail, as it has already been discussed fully — and I cannot possibly say much which may not already in substance have been said, and much better said than I could expect to say it — but I rise to record my protest against the usurpation which this House, in my humble opinion, is guilty of in undertaking to pass this measure, or, so far as in its power lies, to impose upon the people of this country a Constitution contrary to their wishes — a Constitution which they will never have an opportunity of seeing, until they are called upon to submit to it and obey it. I rise to protest also against this parliamentary gag by which the attempt is made to suppress free discussion in this House, and to compel it to adopt against its will, or against its reason and judgement, a measure with which, perhaps, a very large number of honourable members of this House have no real sympathy. It is no answer to me to say that I may express my views freely — that I may discuss this question. It is no answer to say that I have the privilege of pointing out the defects of this measure, if I am denied the privilege of obtaining the sense of this House, and of putting on record what I may consider its objectionable features — if I am denied the right of submitting to the House substantive motions and resolutions, which might perhaps meet the sense of the majority of this House and which at all events would afford to the people of this country the opportunity of knowing the views of the honourable members of this House upon possible amendments which might be proposed to this measure. At an early period of this session, I gave notice of substantial resolutions which, however little they might have met the sense of the majority of this House, express the views of a large majority of my constituents. It would interest them to see how far those views met the approbation of the representatives of the people here; it would interest them to know how far honourable gentlemen from Upper Canada are prepared to go to insure to the English speaking minority of Lower Canada those rights and liberties which they claim for themselves; it would afford us some criterion by which we might measure the degree of protection we should find in the Federal Parliament, from possible oppression in our Local Parliament. For if honourable gentlemen from Upper Canada, on the floor of this House, will not hear us today, if they manifest an indifference to the injustice about to be inflicted upon the English speaking inhabitants of Lower Canada by the proposed Constitution, what guarantee have we that similar selfishness may not mark their conduct after we shall be powerless to rebuke it? I will read those resolutions which I had deigned to propose, for the purpose of obtaining the opinion of the House on a modification of this measure, which, if it must be adopted, might possibly have been so amended as to remove many serious objections now entertained to it by a large portion of the people of Lower Canada. They are in these words:

Resolved, That assuming the Federal system of government to be a political necessity in a union of the British North American provinces, any Confederation of those provinces which ignores the differences of race, language and religion of the inhabitants of the respective states or territories sought to be thus united, and is not framed with a view to secure to the inhabitants of each such state or territory the management of their own local affairs, in accordance with their own peculiar views and sentiments, is unwise and inexpedient, and not conducive to good government, or to peace and tranquility of those for whom it is framed.

This resolution I put forth simply for the sake of showing the idea which I had in my mind, without, I am free to confess, any expectation that the particular modification which I was about to propose would meet the sense of the majority of this House, but as giving an indication of the direction in which the English speaking inhabitants of Lower Canada would consider their interests might be best preserved. The second resolution I designed to propose is as follows:

Resolved, That with a view to secure to that portion of the inhabitants of Lower Canada speaking the English language, the free exercise and enjoyment of their own ideas, institutions and rights, in any proposed Confederation of the provinces, Canada should be divided into three civil divisions, to wit: Western, Central, and Eastern Canada.

Why is it that objection is made to a legislative union? The reason why so large a portion of the people of Lower Canada of French origin will not consent to a legislative union, is the very reason that makes it desirable to the English speaking population of Lower Canada. We are in favour of a legislative union. We desire that Canada should be a united people, ignoring sectionalism, and basing our institutions upon one broad principle of Canadian nationality, which shall blend all races, and in time obliterate all accidental distinctions of language, religion, or origin. Our French Canadian fellow-subjects will not consent to this. If they will not hear our arguments, let them listen to their own. If Federalism is necessary for the protection of their rights, it is necessary in a tenfold degree for the protection of the rights of the English-speaking minority. They tell us we may rely upon their well-known liberality and toleration. It would be unworthy of us to submit to such humiliation. In these remarks which are forced from me, and which I am compelled to make in defence of the rights and liberties of those who sent me here, I mean no disrespect to those of another origin — to the French-Canadian honourable gentlemen whom I see around me. (HEAR, HEAR) In many respects I sympathize with them, and have always sympathized with them. I desire to live among my French-Canadian fellow-subjects in peace. I desire to maintain those amicable relations which have always subsisted between the English-speaking and the French-Canadian populations of Lower Canada. As I said before, I sympathize with my French-Canadian fellow-subjects in many respects. I respect their character, I admire their laws. But this antagonism is not courted by me. It is forced upon me. Let me call the attention of honourable gentlemen, more especially of those from Upper Canada, to the position in which this proposed Constitution now before the House would place the English-speaking people of Lower Canada. I may say at the outset, that although they number only one-fourth of the population, they possess at least one-third of the property, and pay one-half of the taxes. The French-Canadian differs very materially in many respects from the Englishmen, or the Anglo-Saxon. He is more simple in his habits, more frugal in his mode of life, and less disposed to novelty. He is content to ride in a carriage of the same fashion as that of his grandfather. He is wedded to his institutions, his old customs, and old laws. It is different with the English-speaking people. They are, as a people, more extravagant, more eager for novelty, and in many other respects widely different from the French-Canadians in their tastes and habits. Of course a comparison would be invidious, and I do not desire to institute one. But I am not at liberty to ignore the facts. Let us see how, under this proposed Constitution, the English-speaking people would be placed in reference to their peculiar interests and their peculiar ideas. In the first place, I would desire to direct your attention to the 14th resolution, by which it is provided how, especially after the local governments are established, the Legislative Council of the General Government is to be constituted — by its members being appointed by the Federal Government on the nomination of the respective local governments. We must bear in mind that in this Local Legislature which will be imposed on Lower Canada, the English element will not certainly be more than one-fifth in number. Under these circumstances, and under the peculiar provisions with reference to the powers granted to the local governments, by which the legislative councillors are to be appointed by the General Government on the recommendation of the local governments, and in the case of Lower Canada, when its Local Government will be four-fifths French-Canadian and only one-fifth of English origin, think you how many English members from Lower Canada would ever find their way to the Legislative Council? How would it be possible, when the Legislative Council is to be appointed on the recommendation of the Local Government, and that Local Government four-fifths French-Canadian, for the English element to obtain fair representation in the Legislative Council? When, I say, would an English-speaking inhabitant of Lower Canada ever receive such a recommendation, unless he approved himself more French than English? (HEAR, HEAR) Again, by the 23rd resolution, it is provided that "the Legislature of each province shall divide such province into the proper number of constituencies, and define the boundaries of each of them." How easy would it be, under the provisions of that clause, for the Local Legislature to snuff out one-half of the English constituencies in Lower Canada. They might arrange their bounds in such a manner that the English-speaking element would be confined within very narrow limits. There would be a few constituencies left entirely English, but the English population would thus be deprived of the influence which their numbers and wealth should give them in the Local Legislature (HEAR, HEAR) Again, the Local Legislature will have power to alter or amend their Constitution from time to time. We today may frame a Constitution — the English-speaking majority in this House may frame a Constitution which would give proper protection to the English-speaking population of Lower Canada. But, by this scheme it will be in the power the local legislatures to change that, and to modify it, so as to suit it to the wishes or prejudices of the French majority. We would be powerless, after we leave these halls, any longer to conserve our rights, and the privileges which this Parliament might give us may be taken away at the very first session of the Local Legislature. Then look at the powers which, under this Constitution, are conferred upon Local Government. The first I find is the power of direct taxation. In case of all governments, the power of taxation is the most important power they can possess. It is that which concerns all portions and all classes of the community, and which gives rise to the greatest controversy, and the greatest amount of difficulty. It is the most important of all legislative powers, and this power is to be conferred on the Local Legislature of a province, where one nationality has four-fifths of the numbers, and the other nationality contributes one-half of the taxes. Then the Local Legislature is to have the control of immigration — a very important subject, which deeply interests the English-speaking population of Lower Canada — but they would have no voice in framing the measures which might be adopted for directing and controlling that important matter. Then the Local Legislature is to have the control of education. And what subject can there be of greater importance? And what subject is there which might be a source of greater strife between two nationalities, which by this provision would be brought into antagonism? Even under our present system, with sixty-five Upper Canadian English-speaking members, who would naturally be expected to sympathise with the English-speaking people of Lower Canada, it is a crying grievance with the latter that they cannot get legislation on the subject of education as they desire. What, then, would they have to expect if they went into a Legislature where four-fifths of the representatives were of a different nationality and a different religion, and whose prejudices and interests were in opposition to the claims of the one-fifth minority? (HEAR, HEAR) Then the Local Legislature is to have control of "the establishment, maintenance and management of hospitals, asylums, charities, and eleemosynary institutions." Now it is a positive fact, as I have stated before, that the English-speaking population of Lower Canada, on account of their wealth and expensive mode of living, their extravagant habits, their desire for change and progress, their different ideas generally from the French-Canadians, consume more than one-half of the dutiable goods that are brought into this country, and pay one-half of the taxes; and yet the money which they would pay into the public chest would be distributed by a majority over whom they had no control — a majority who would not in any manner sympathise with them; and their taxes would be applied to objects which they might not deem desirable — which they might, perhaps, consider detrimental to their interests. And they would be completely without remedy, should this proposed Constitution unfortunately be imposed upon them. (HEAR, HEAR) It is painful to me to be compelled to refer to these matters. It is not with pleasure that I bring before the House the antagonism which would inevitably arise between the two nationalities, should they be brought together into one Legislature, with such a vast disproportion between their means of taking their own part. We are told, and told very truly — I rejoice that it is the fact — that hitherto the two races in Lower Canada have lived in peace. But it would be impossible that they could any longer live in peace; it would be impossible that with such a disparity of numbers, and with such antagonistic interests, they should not come into conflict. It would be constant warfare, and this new Constitution, instead of settling the sectional difficulties in this country, instead of removing jealousies and heart-burnings, would have the very opposite effect. From the fact that the field of conflict would be smaller, that the arena would be more circumscribed, the strife would be all the fiercer. You are not bringing peace, but a sword. (HEAR, HEAR)

MR POWELL—Does the leader of the Opposition in Lower Canada assent to that? (HEAR, HEAR)

MR. O’HALLORAN—It is not my province to inquire what any hon. gentleman assents to or dissents from. What I have to do is to see that the interests of those who sent me here are not put in jeopardy. And it will be for the leader of the Opposition to see that he too, on his part, faithfully discharges his duty to those he represents. But, sir, the English-speaking of Lower Canada are to be amused, and their attention is to be diverted from a full examination of those serious matters which press themselves upon our consideration, by cleverly drawn abstractions and sophistries, such as new nationalities — union is strength — a great empire — and the other plausible pretexts that are attempted to be imposed upon them. We are gravely asked: "What man would remain poor, when he could at once become rich? What man would remain weak, when he could at once become powerful? Who would be diminutive, when merely by taking thought he could add cubits to his stature? What people would continue to be a mere colony, when by the stroke of a pen they could at once become an empire, under a new nationality?" Sir, these sophistries will not impose upon the people of this country. Where is the demonstration furnished us that by this scheme you would be add one dollar to the wealth of this country, or one human being to its inhabitants, or one inch to is territory? We do not find it afforded during the course of this debate. I have listened attentively to the arguments in favour of the scheme, but no attempt has been made to demonstrate these things. It has been repeatedly stated that we are about to consolidate the strength of this country, in order to resist invasion; but I should like to know in what manner such an end is promoted by this measure. Are we not already united under one Government? Are we not already living under the control of the same executive power? Do we not fight under the same flag, and pay allegiance to the same Sovereign? Is not every man in Nova Scotia, New Brunswick, Newfoundland, and Prince Edward Island just as much under the control of our Government as the inhabitants of this province? It is all sophistry this idea that we are going to increase the strength of this country by the proposed union with the Lower Provinces. An attempt is made to alarm us by sensational rumours about invasion, and it is stated that we must put forth every possible strength to save ourselves from being swallowed up by the neighbouring republic; and we are gravely told that through the action of a number of self-constituted delegates assembled around a green table, and adopting certain resolutions, the whole of the physical laws relating to our country are to be changed. Newfoundland and Prince Edward Island are to be brought up into Lake Ontario, and the whole of our territory is to be compacted, consolidated and strengthened. Our extended frontier is no longer to be exposed to attack, and, if attacked, will be much more easily defended. Is this not the most absurd sophistry? Can paper resolutions change the laws of nature, or modify the physical geography of the country. Will not Newfoundland be as isolated from this province after the Confederation shall have been adopted, as it is today? I think, sir, it is generally admitted that Canada is unequal to the defence of its own frontier against invasion from the only quarter from which it is apprehended. It is also admitted that the Maritime provinces are alike unequal to the defence of their own frontier. By what process then will you demonstrate to me, that by adding the force of those provinces to our own, there will not be the same defencelessness at present? Will there not be the same disproportion between the defensive power and the object to be defended? (HEAR, HEAR.) Mr. Speaker, in the first place I perceive no immediate necessity for those constitutional changes. I think that our present Constitution is ample for the wants of the people of this country, and that all the difficulties, either real or imaginary, under which we labour, might be solved within the limits of our present Constitution. I consider all our difficulties to be merely sectional, arising neither from differences of religion, of origin, of language, or of laws. On examination it will be found that they are merely fiscal difficulties, and that they arise from the fact that our General Government does not confine itself to the true end and object of its existence. Do away with your local grants, and your absurd system of compensating for one improper expenditure by the creation of another. Let there be no expenditure for merely local purposes, or for purposes that do not properly come within the functions of the General Government. (HEAR, HEAR.) By what rule of right, for instance, are the inhabitants of Upper Canada called upon to pay for the redemption of the seigniorial tenure of Lower Canada; and what right has Lower Canada to be called upon to meet the extravagant municipal indebtness of Upper Canada? If our difficulties arise from differences of language and races, how comes it that the English-speaking people of Lower Canada have so long harmonized and sympathised with the extreme Ultramontane party of Lower Canada? (HEAR, HEAR.) I think you cannot find any reason for it, except on the supposition that they remain united for the purpose of maintaining their sectional power and influence, under a system by which the common exchequer is deemed a legitimate object of public plunder. Each section seems to have always regarded the public chest as fair game; and it is undeniable that Lower Canada has generally had the best of it. These things caused dissatisfaction in the minds of people from other sections of the country, and they undertake to form combinations for the purpose of obtaining from the public chest similar undue advantages. The remedy for this state of things is to deprive the Legislature of the power to make grants for local objects. Let there be no revenue collected more than is absolutely necessary for the general expenses of the country, and let it be distributed for those general purposes with due economy, and we shall hear nothing more of sectional difficulties. (HEAR, HEAR.) Mr. Speaker, in connection with this same idea, I find that in my own mind another very important consideration connected with the administration of the government of our country. It has now, I believe, ceased to be a crime to "look to Washington." Not long ago, the term "looking to Washington" was one of reproach. But that time has passed away, and our friends on the other side of the House have not only looked to Washington, but absolutely gone there, and imported the worst features of the republican system for incorporation in our new Constitution. While they were doing this, I regret very much that they did not import from Washington, or from some other parts of the United States, their ideas of economy in the administration of the fiscal affairs of the country. (HEAR, HEAR.) I regret they did not import from that country a very important principle prevailing there, to the effect that the Government of the day shall impose as few burdens upon the people as possible. Today, sir, we are paying the man who stands at that door to admit you to this chamber a greater annual salary than is paid to the Governor of the State of Vermont. We are paying the man who stands in that comer with his paste brush to wrap up our papers, more than the indemnity allowed to a United States Senator. We pay the Governor General a greater allowance than is received by the President of the United States of America. We are the most heavily taxed people, and pay larger salaries for the work performed, in proportion to our resources, than any other people in the world.

HON. ATTY. GEN. MACDONALD—We pay ourselves well too. (LAUGHTER.)

MR. O'HALLORAN—It has been said, and it seems to be thought a strong argument in favour of this scheme, that we must do something; that our affairs cannot with advantage go on in the same channel in which they have been doing; and that there is necessity for some change. It is made a complaint that the legislation is obstructed by party strife, and that the country suffers for the want of new laws. Sir, if there is one vulgar error in political economy more false and unsound than another, it is that the prosperity of any country depends on the amount of its legislation. We have, as a general thing, too much legislation. If I may use the term, we are legislated to death. And when I have seen bills pouring into this House by the hundred at every session, I have said to myself:— "What, in Heaven's name, will become of this country if all these bills should, by any possibility, ever become law?" (LAUGHTER.) The idea seems to prevail, that in this country even the grass cannot grow unless growth is regulated by an Act of Parliament. No change in the Constitution of this country will remedy the difficulties of which you complain, for they have their source within ourselves. It is honest, economical administration you require, not legislation, or a change in our form of Government.

"'Bout forms of government let fools contest, That which is best administered is best."

You may remove your seat of government to Ottawa, and increase your Legislature from 130 to 194 members, but you will find the same difficulties under any system of government which you may adopt, so long as you continue extravagant sectional expenditure. Those difficulties will still meet you in the face, so long as the legislature or legislatures of the country are permitted to exercise functions that do not properly belong to a general government; so long as you refuse to compel localities to meet their own local expenditure by local means, you will find the same causes producing the same effects in Ottawa as in Quebec. Colum non animam mutant qui trans mare currunt. (You but change your skies by the proposed constitutional changes.) I remarked, at the outset, that I must deny to this House the right to impose on this country this or any other Constitution, without first obtaining the consent of the people. Who sent you here to frame a Constitution? You were sent here to administer the Constitution as you find it. Throughout the length and breadth of British North America, there is not one other government that has dared to arrogate to itself the right of changing the Constitution of their people without consulting them, except ours. I am surprised, sir, that even this strong Government of ours have dared to assume this power, when, sooner or later, they must go before the people of the country. (HEAR, HEAR.) There comes to my hand, this evening, a resolution proposed by the Honourable Attorney General of Newfoundland in the Legislature of that colony. It is instructive as showing that there was one uniform sentiment throughout all the Lower Provinces, in favour of submitting the question to the people. It was so submitted in New Brunswick—it met its fate. It is now about to be submitted to the people of Nova Scotia. The Administration of this province have been wiser in their generation than those of the Lower Provinces. They did not dare submit it for the consideration of the people — a course which, if not exhibiting wisdom on their part, shows, at least, that skill and craft in public matters for which most of them have become famous. (HEAR, HEAR.) The resolution I have referred to, and which embodies the policy of the Government of Newfoundland on this question, is as follows:— Resolved,—That having had under their most serious and deliberate consideration the proposal for the formation of a Federal union of the British North American Provinces, upon the terms contained in the report of the Convention of delegates, held at Quebec, on the 10th of October last—the despatch of the right Honourable the Secretary of State for the Colonies, dated December 3, 1864—the observations of His Excellency the Governor in relation to this subject in his opening Speech of the present session—and the report of the Newfoundland delegates—this committee are of the opinion, that having regard to the comparative novelty and very great importance of this project, it is desirable that before a vote of the Legislature is taken upon it, it should be submitted to the consideration of the people at large, particularly as the action of the other provinces does not appear to require that it should be hastily disposed of, and as (the present being the last session of this Assembly) no unreasonable delay can be occasioned by this course; and they, therefore, recommend that a final determination upon this important subject be differed to the next meeting of the Legislature. (HEAR, HEAR.)

AN HON. MEMBER—That is the report of a committee.

MR. O'HALLORAN—Yes, it is the report of a committee; but it was submitted to the Legislature by the Hon. Attorney General as the policy of the Government. Of course, if the resolution is not carried in the Legislature, then the scheme is doubly defeated. In this little, petty province, whose interests, as compared with ours, are of trifling importance in relation to the scheme, the Government considers that the question is one of sufficient moment to demand that before the slightest action is taken upon it by the Legislature, the people should be consulted; but in this large province, with its comparatively large population, and with important interests to be affected, the scheme is to be hurried through without allowing the people to have a voice in the matter, or even to have time for its consideration. (HEAR, HEAR.) They are to have no voice in determining what kind of government they and their children are to live under for years to come. Mr. Speaker, I know very well that it is a bold declaration for me to make, that this Parliament has no right to deal with this question; but, sir, I make it not hastily nor unadvisedly, because I defy honourable gentlemen to find a precedent for their proposed action in any free country under similar circumstances. We are not living to-day in a time of revolution or of great emergency; but even if our circumstances were different, I doubt very much if any of the precedents that have been referred to, as having occurred many years ago and in troublous times, could again be practiced or adopted, even in England, from which country we draw all our precedents. The precedents which have been invoked in approval of the course that has been adopted by the Government prove too much. If they form a justification for the course we are pursuing, then you might prove by the same means that this House had the power to perpetuate its existence beyond the limit fixed for the termination of the present Parliament, or vote ourselves members for life. We might just as well constitute ourselves life members of the Federal Legislature of the proposed Confederacy, as to take the action that is contemplated. I know that it is represented as very important that the measure should be carried into immediate operation; but that is a matter of mere expediency, and has nothing to do with constitutional principles. (HEAR, HEAR.) The Irish union has been triumphantly referred to as a precedent for this measure. To my mind it is a most unfortunate one, and little deserving of our imitation. Let me show you how this matter has been regarded by one, whose authority will not be disputed. I read from May's Constitutional History of England, page 505 of the 2nd volume. Speaking of the union of Ireland with England, he says:

A great end was compassed by means the most base and shameless. Grattan, Lord Charlemont, Ponsonby, Plunkett, and a few patriots, continued to protest against the sale of the liberties and free Constitution of Ireland. Their eloquence and public virtue command the respect of posterity; but the wretched history of their country denies them its sympathy.

This, sir, is the judgement of the impartial English historian upon the means by which this great national crime was consummated, and it is the just encomium on the noble few whose patriotic efforts failed to prevent it. I read it, in anticipation, as the future history of the wrong now about to be perpetrated on the people of this country; and while it implies, on the one hand, in no doubtful terms, the well-merited praise of the small band who stand here tonight for the rights of the people, in opposition to this scheme, it pronounces, on the other, the just condemnation of those who trample on those rights, and who forget, in the pride of their brief authority, who it was that raised them to the positions they occupy, not that they might coerce, but carry out the will of the people, the only rightful source of political power. (CHEERS)

== Family anecdotes ==
The following notes were written by Helen Spier, granddaughter of James O'Halloran. The notes provide slightly different birth information than that found in some published records.

1820: About this date, Grandfather James O'Halloran was born in Armagh, Ireland.

1827: His parents with their children emigrated to America, settling in Burlington Vermont. They had sailed from Cork.

They were Roman Catholics, and it must have been the case that some of the well-off parishioners became very interested in the affairs of the new Irish arrivals. Certainly one such family persuaded the O'H parents to let them take little Elizabeth to live with them. She was a bit younger than James, and a most beautiful child. Apparently, the arrangement allowed no interference with family communication, so she was not adopted but simply taken good care of, since her own parents were poor. But the circumstance led to her meeting and friendship with an outstanding young lawyer from Montreal, Marcus Doherty – who became a guest in the house when Elizabeth was in her teens. They married when she was quite young, and of course made Montreal their home. - (This family connection with Marcus Doherty would be one of the influences on James, causing him to be a Canadian citizen for the major part of his life).

James began a business while still a little lad at junior school, selling papers and taking unusual interest in the printing office. To the point, that he was able to have work in the office while he was still a young school-boy. By age fourteen, he interviewed the authorities in the University of Vermont to see if they would allow him to begin university work, at once. He admitted that up to then, he "had no Latin", but asked if he might not try the first University year despite this. Adding, that if at the end he did not pass as well as the other students, he would not ask them to give him a further try. His efforts were successful. (For several years, near the end of his life, - there used to be a fresh, illuminated document, each autumn, on his mantel shelf; - the invitation to their oldest, living graduate, to attend the Commencement ceremonies at University of Vermont, Burlington). - His work meant not only the B.A. but also his reading of Law – So his anxiety to begin early, had sound reasons. Naturally too, he knew that he would be trying to earn his living while a student; and this led to his work as tutor during the latter part of the time.

One season, while tutoring in the south, with some family there, he, and they, were distracted by events in the war between Mexico and the U.S. and James enlisted with the American troops, and went off to the border with them. His column was promptly taken as prisoners of war by the Mexicans, and when it became clear that they, the prisoners, were being lined up to be shot, James felt stupid at realizing he could speak no Spanish, since he had a hunch there was a mistake somewhere about this order. He decided on the next-best thing, and began to repeat the Pater Noster – It had an electric effect – Shouting, "Chretiano! Chretiano!!"- the Mexican officer countermanded, and the prisoners were presently freed completely. Apparently, the Americans had been mistaken for northern Indians and as the main body of American forces were close by the place, it was not the intention of the Mexicans to draw fire from there. The whole war must have been fairly short; but James' commanding officer did not forget him. The same officer was in command of troops in the western States when California was taken into the fold. He was in search of someone to be appointed first Chief Magistrate of the new State, and he wrote offering the post to James O'H. – This must have been close to 1847, as I think that 1847 must also have been the year of marriage between James and his wife. She was Mary Anne Finley, of Dunham, Quebec and she was 17 years old when she married James, who was about 27 then. – In re the offer of a big California post to him, he answered the officer with the explanation that he had arranged to practice law in Canada, where he had bought a farm for his parents, and was also about to be married, and therefore must decline the invitation.

Dunham, prior to 1866, meant the Township of Dunham, which included Cowansville, Sweetsburg and many more square miles. The History of Dunham claims that it was the first of the so-called Townships. Long before that date, English-speaking citizens had been encouraged by the British Govt to buy land and develop villages, near the border with the U S. - Hence, the logical place for James O'H to invest in some small holding for the parents (I think that the O'H great-grandparents were never able to make headway with finances, and James would want them within reach wherever he settled down to practise law.)- The Dunham area would be among the first to have a court of law, serving rural places near Montreal. Modern Dunham is still a fairly small village – but in the 1840s and 1850s, it was a larger place than the other villages.

Where James and Mary Anne lived for the first few years of their marriage, I do not know – somewhere in Cowansville as it was, in early days. The brick house on the main street, part-way to Sweetsburg, was built by James before the 8th child was born. This child was …

[The rest is cut off the bottom of the page]

…the family to be born in the house where her parents spent the rest of their lives.

Aside from his law practice, James O'Halloran had many interests. For a time, he represented Missisquoi County in the Quebec Legislature, before and after the 1867 debates. He approved Confederation, but voted for delaying it, in favour of giving people more time to comprehend. He probably knew more about the vast problems in the U.S. at that time, than any of the others in Canadian politics, and was not easily alarmed by fears of annexation that some of his colleagues suggested. - He had what few other people ever experience: the gift of remembering word for word, whatever he read that was worth remembering. And he read enormously. The development of Canada in his day was tied up with transportation problems: hence, he knew railroad-minded people, and this explains, in part, his long association with the law department of the C.P.R. and as a side-line, with the Boston & Maine. All of his older life, until almost 90, he travelled certain days of the week into Montreal to his office in the C.P.R. building, returning to Cowansville that evening. (As a youngster, one of my treats was to drive with the gardener to the train to meet him, or to take him in the morning) He may have done this less often, by the time he reached 85 – But he was wonderfully himself, and well, until a very great age. - - In village matters when younger, he had been active in getting both the Catholic and the Anglican churches built. And he was certainly consulted often by both Priest and Rector, in all their concerns. Someone once asked him what he was going to do about his children, since he was a Catholic and his wife a Protestant. James answered that if his wife could bring up her children to be as good as she was herself, this was his best wish for them.

He meant what he said, always – and was so genuine in everything, that one knew he was deeply religious at heart, but felt that the sect to which one had belonged was personal, and not a matter for dispute. By the time that I came along, he began to show age in the whiteness of his hair and he looked as the Notman picture of him shows him, from the time when I can first remember him (high-chair age for me) until he died, when I was 21. So it is remarkable that he could be as companionable as he was, to a small grandchild. I slid down the stairs on its mahogany rail, to meet him quickly once –, when we were both dismayed to see that the brass buttons on my sailor suit had scratched the rail! He went to his library and came right back with the ink-pot, and carefully covered the tell-tale marks, - to the complete satisfaction of ourselves. But the ink was green, after all. So the other elders beheld the damage and no one was fooled. But, no one dared say anything – Helen was too small to have handled all that ink so deftly, and we just talked about other things.... He spoke most beautifully, and read aloud or quoted as naturally as he would talk. It was a treat if he asked at Sunday lunch what the text of the sermon was. First, a bit of rustle on the part of the Aunts, to remember and quote correctly. - Grandfather would take up the narrative, and finish that part of the scripture, or even lead up to it and end the verses, as though the Book were open in front of him – He must have been past 65 when I was at boarding-school, and spending some holidays at Cowansville. He wanted to know what I was studying at the moment, and I mentioned, proudly, that I had begun to read Virgil. -He just commenced with the first Book and went on for at least two pages -verbatim. This I knew, as I had had to memorize most of it as I went along. -But it must have been generations since he had looked at it!

The O'Halloran house in Cowansville must have been a great hive of industry for its first 50 years, with the large family of young people, and the many other relations who stayed or lived there. James' mother lived with them after being a widow, and partially blind. She used to do fine hemming for the household, and Mother and Uncle Jim, when children, always threaded numerous needles for the days' work of their Granny. - Later, when the Finley grandparents were gone, their youngest daughter, Jane, came to live with the O'H's – and presently, older nephews joined the family for their school holidays. Our Uncle Joe was only about 20, when I first remember staying in the house – and several of his own nieces and nephews were so close to his age then, that none of us ever called him "Uncle". - Small wonder if the house always had a festive, hospitable air, to me, and I know that the Grandparents were never happier than when the place was filled by all ages of us... Music at home was a must, in those days, and James was almost as fond of music as of his books. So the older sisters and Mother could never remember a time when they could not read and play whatever music the occasion needed. Lessons in Montreal or from good organists elsewhere were provided for them, as long as they wished to study (They were a mystery to me, as I am convinced they knew as much instinctively, as from anything they were taught!)

The last few years of the household were very quiet, with only James and his dear "Sissy", as he called Aunt Elizabeth. He was in his 90s, and still active, until a short attack of pneumonia. Sitting up in bed, and wishing to have the Home Rule Bill for Ireland read to him from the morning paper, he listened with attention –, and this way, he died, as though falling asleep. This was the summer of 1913. He was 93.
