= Joseph-Léon Deslières =

Canadian politician (1893–1986)

Member of Parliament for Brome—Missisquoi
- In office May 26, 1952 – March 30, 1958
- Preceded by: Henri Gosselin
- Succeeded by: Heward Grafftey

Personal details
- Born: June 12, 1893 Sutton, Quebec, Canada
- Died: March 9, 1986 (aged 92) Sutton, Quebec, Canada
- Party: Liberal
- Spouse: Adelia Lebeau (m. 1927; died 1966)
- Profession: Wholesaler

Joseph-Léon Deslières (June 12, 1893 – March 9, 1986) was a Liberal party member of the House of Commons of Canada. He was born in Sutton, Quebec and became a wholesaler by career.

He was first elected at the Brome—Missisquoi riding in a by-election on 26 May 1952 following the death of incumbent member Henri Gosselin. Deslières was re-elected there in the 1953 federal election and re-elected for another full term in 1957. After completing his term in the 23rd Canadian Parliament, he left federal politics and did not seek re-election in the 1958 election. His wife, Adelia Lebeau died aged 73 in 1966. She was buried in Sutton. Joseph Desliéres died in 1986 in Sutton.
