= Louis Villeneuve =

Canadian politician

Louis Villeneuve MP

Member of Parliament for Brome—Missisquoi
- Incumbent
- Assumed office April 28, 2025
- Preceded by: Pascale St-Onge

Personal details
- Party: Liberal
- Website: louisvilleneuve.ca

Louis Villeneuve MP is a Canadian politician from the Liberal Party of Canada. He was elected Member of Parliament for Brome—Missisquoi. He is a businessman, researcher and columnist. Villeneuve has spent four years as a city councillor and is in his second term as mayor of Bromont. He and his partner Sylvie Guévin have one daughter.

== Electoral record ==
2025 Canadian federal election: Brome—Missisquoi
| Party | Candidate | Votes | % | ±% | Expenditures |
|---|---|---|---|---|---|
| Liberal | Louis Villeneuve | 34,727 | 48.26 | +13.31 | $63,899.89 |
| Bloc Québécois | Jeff Boudreault | 20,182 | 28.05 | –6.59 | $40,166.16 |
| Conservative | Steve Charbonneau | 13,743 | 19.10 | +2.90 | $83,948.48 |
| New Democratic | Zoé Larose | 1,600 | 2.22 | –4.00 | $0.00 |
| Green | Michelle Corcos | 1,139 | 1.58 | –0.80 | $0.00 |
| People's | Jack McLeod | 561 | 0.78 | –2.44 | $560.00 |
| Total valid votes/expense limit | | 71,952 | 98.78 | +0.56 | $145,183.34 |
| Total rejected ballots | | 888 | 1.22 | –0.56 | |
| Turnout | | 72,840 | 72.46 | +6.39 | |
| Eligible voters (Note: Number of eligible voters does not include election day registrations.) | | 100,527 | | | |
| Liberal hold | | Swing | | +9.95 | |
Source: Elections Canada
