= Alain Forand =

Major General (ret) Alain Forand
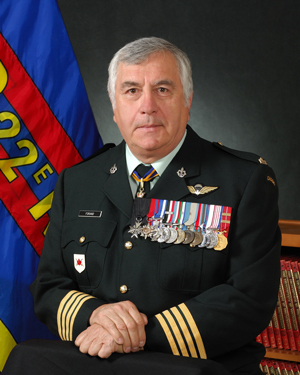
- Colonel of the Royal 22^{e} Régiment 2009-2015
- Born: January 27, 1944 (age 82); Farnham, Quebec, Canada
- Military career
- Allegiance: Canada
- Branch: Canadian Forces/Land Force Command
- Service years: 1967–2000; 2007–2015
- Rank: Major General
- Commands: 3rd Battalion Royal 22^{e} Régiment; 5 Canadian Mechanized Brigade Group; UN MND SW Croatia (Commander); Land Force Quebec Area
- Conflicts: Cyprus; Croatia
- Awards: Commander - Order of Military Merit; Officer - Order St.John; Star of Courage; Meritorious Service Cross; Canadian Forces' Decoration

Major-General Joseph Robert Alain Pierre (Alain) Forand, CMM SC MSC CD (born January 27, 1944) is a Canadian infantry officer and the former Colonel of the Royal 22^{e} Régiment.

== Early life ==
Alain Forand was born in Farnham, Quebec, Canada on 27 January 1944. He is married to Pierrette Langlois and is father of two sons: Jean Guillaume and Marc Antoine.

== Military career ==
In 1967, Major-General Alain Forand enlisted in the Canadian Armed Forces as an infantry officer with the Royal 22^{e} Régiment. He served in all the battalions of the regiment in Canada and Germany as well with the Canadian Airborne Regiment. Major-General Forand commanded the 3rd Battalion, Royal 22^{e} Régiment (Valcartier, Quebec, the 5th Mechanized Brigade Group of Canada (Valcartier, Quebec)) and the Quebec Area Land Force (Montreal, Quebec). His other assignments were the Aide de Camp (ADC) of the Commander of the Army, Infantry School Chief Instructor, Instructor at the Army Command and Staff College in Kingston (Ontario), responsible for training the Army and postings as Staff Officer at NDHQ (Ottawa, Ontario), at Colonel and Brigadier-General as responsible for plans and operations. Major-General Forand participated in three United Nations missions: UNFICYP (2), MINURSO (2), UNPROFOR.

He is known for many accomplishments throughout his career.

He served in Cyprus in 1974 with the Canadian Airborne Regiment during the Turkish invasion. He was awarded the Star of Courage for his extraordinary actions under enemy fire.

In 1991, he assumed the position of higher Liaison Officer Group belligerents "POLISARIO" and later became the Deputy Commander for the mission of the United Nations Referendum in Western Sahara. In 1993 he was given command of 5,000 soldiers of the 5th Mechanized Brigade Group of Canada and the Canadian Forces Base Valcartier. During this period, he was responsible for training more than 4,000 soldiers deployed to UN missions.

In 1995, Major-General Forand became the Commander of the Southern Sector of the United Nations in Croatia when the Croatian army became master of the Serbo-Croatian separatist republic. Major-General Forand often reported war atrocities committed in the territory surrounding his area of responsibility. Despite threats by and constraints of the Croatian authorities, he ensured the safety of 1,200 Serbs that took refuge in his camp. Upon his return to Canada, he was awarded the Meritorious Service Cross for his actions in Croatia.

From 1996 to 1998, Major-General Forand was the Commander of the Quebec Area Land Force in Montreal. This command was marked by the Saguenay flood operation and the famous ice storm of 1998, where he successfully led the activities of more than 12,000 soldiers and worked closely with political, civil and public safety authorities to quickly resolve the crisis. In 1997, Major-General Forand was appointed Commander of the Order of Military Merit and in 1999 was admitted to the Order of St. John. From 1998 to 2000, Major-General Forand was the executive director of the Group of National Contingency Planning for Y2K.

== Citation - Star of Courage ==
On July 23, 1974, during the war in Cyprus, a Canadian patrol conducting a group of combatants out of a UN controlled area came under fire. Several combatant soldiers were killed or wounded and the Canadian officer leading the escort party was wounded. One of his men who began to render him first aid was also hit. At the bottom of a creek bed, the victims were exposed to continuing machine gun fire. Coming on the scene, Captain Alain Forand arranged for covering fire and, with complete disregard for his own safety, he crawled forward over the exposed ground, to aid the two casualties. Single-handedly, he managed to drag the wounded officer some distance up onto the bank of the creek where others then helped carry him out of the danger area. Captain Forand then directed the rescue of the wounded soldier.

== Citation Meritorious Service Cross ==
From July to October 1995, Brigadier-General Forand served as Commander of Sector South with the United Nations Confidence Restoration Operation (UNCRO) in the Serb-controlled territory of Krajina in Croatia. During "Operation Storm", which started on August 4, 1995, he provided outstanding leadership and demonstrated extreme courage and determination. Thanks to his actions, countless UN peacekeepers and more than 700 Serb refugees escaped injury.

== In retirement ==
Major-General Forand retired from the Canadian Forces in August 2000 after 33 years of honorable service.

He was a member of the Board of Directors of Hydro-Québec from 2000 to 2004. He was Colonel Commandant of the Canadian Infantry from August 2001 to October 2004, Honorary Colonel of the 4th Intelligence Company-LFQA and Honorary Lieutenant-Colonel 4^{e} Bataillon Royal 22^{e} Régiment until summer 2009. He is a member of the Board of the Corps of Commissionaires Montreal Region and member of the board of IInterloge Montreal. He acts as a senior consultant and mentor at Rheinmetall and acts as mentor at the Canadian Forces College in Toronto. Major-General Forand became the 14th Colonel of the Royal 22nd Regiment June 26, 2009.

In 2008, Major-General Forand testified at the International Court of Justice of La Hague in the case of former Serb generals answering for war crime charges in the 2005 Operation Storm.

Major-General Forand is the honorary president of the branch Major-General Alain R. Forand of the Canadian Association of Veterans in United Nations peace (CAVUNP) since its founding in 1988 in Chambly, QC.

In 2012, Major-General received his third bar of the Canadian Forces' Decoration for 42 years of ongoing service and received the medal for the Queen's Diamond Jubilee.

In March 2014, Major-General Forand participated in a commemorative ceremony in Cyprus of the 50th Anniversary of Canada's Peacekeeping Mission to Cyprus accompanied by a delegation of UNFICYP veterans and Canada's Veterans Affairs minister, M. Julian Fantino

2014 was the anniversary year of the Royal 22nd Regiment. Major-General Forand represented the Regiment throughout the 100th Anniversary activities. On May 14, 2014, Major-General Forand lead a delegation of the Regiment to Vatican City and had the Regimental colors blessed by the Pope Francis.

Afterward, he led the Regiment at Buckingham Palace where the palace"s guard duties were assumed by the Royal 22nd Regiment and all commands given in French Canadian– an historic moment.

On June 15, 2015, Major-General Forand passed on his role of Colonel of the Regiment to Lieutenant-General Richard Évraire at the Citadelle of Quebec.

== Bibliography ==
Major-General Forand has authored a number of books and papers.

=== Books ===
- CYPRUS 1974, 'THIS AIN'T NO PICNIC, IT'S WAR'
- Star of Courage: Recognizing the Heroes Among Us
- Canadian Peacekeepers: Grades 5-8
- Out of Darkness, Light: a History of Canadian Military Intelligence, Volume 2, 1983-1997

=== Articles ===
- Canadian Army Journal - 2001 - MGen Forand: I am proud to be in the military
- 2011 - Canadian Military Journal - Military Ethics
- PEACEKEEPING AND PEACEMAKING MINUTES - Major General Alain R. Forand, peacekeeper extraordinaire
- Canadian Infantry Association - The Canadian Infantryman- Who they really are…. The best!
- Summer of '74 a dark time for our peacekeepers
- Canadians to testify against Croatian officers
- Lest we forget the cost of peacekeeping
- War Crimes Panel Finds Croat Troops 'Cleansed' the Serbs

Military offices
| Preceded by Lcol (Col) J.A.Y. Sarrazin, OMM, CD | Commander of the 3^{e} Battalion Royal 22^{e} Régiment; 1982-1984 | Succeeded by Lcol (Col) J.A.L. Bujold, CD |
| Preceded by MGen R.A. D'Allaire, OC, CMM, GOQ, OStJ, MSC, CD, LOM | Commander of the 5 Canadian Mechanized Brigade Group; 1993-1995 | Succeeded by Bgén (Lgén) J.M.C. Couture, CMM, MSM, CD |
| Preceded by MGen R.A. D'Allaire, OC, CMM, GOQ, OStJ, MSC, CD, LOM | Commander of Land Force Quebec Area HQ; 1996-1998 | Succeeded by Bgén J.J.R. Gagnon, CMM, CD |
| Preceded by Lcol G. Brais, OMM, CD | Honorary Colonel of the 4^{e} Battalion Royal 22^{e} Régiment; 2007-2009 | Succeeded by Lcol J Girardin, CD |
| Preceded by General Maurice Baril, CMM, MSM, CD | Colonel of the Royal 22^{e} Régiment; 2009-2015 | Succeeded by LGen(ret) R. Évraire, CMM, CD |
