= Follin Horace Pickel =

Canadian politician

Follin Horace Pickel (17 November 1866 – 22 December 1949) was a Quebec physician and politician.

He was born in Sweetsburg, Canada East to Horace Darius Pickle who was High Constable of Bedford district and Ruhama Benham.

Pickel attended Bishop's College, graduating in 1888, after which he established his medical practice in Sweetsburg. From 1897 to 1900 he returned to Bishop's to study law but returned to the practice of medicine in 1901 and continued his practice until his death.

In 1910, he and a group of other doctors established the District of Bedford General Hospital, the first hospital in town. He served as president of the board of governors from 1912 to 1922.

He served as mayor of Sweetsburg for more than 40 years and attempted to win a seat in the House of Commons of Canada on a number of occasions. He was an unsuccessful Conservative candidate in Missisquoi in the 1908 federal election losing by 18 votes and lost again in the 1911 federal election. He ran again as a Conservative in Brome—Missisquoi in the 1925 and 1926 federal elections, losing both times, before winning election as an MP in the 1930 federal election. He was defeated when he re-election in 1935.
