= William Stephen Bullock =

Canadian Baptist minister, businessman, and politician

Member of the Legislative Assembly of Quebec for Shefford
- In office 1912–1931
- Preceded by: Ludger-Pierre Bernard
- Succeeded by: Robert-Raoul Bachand

Member of the Legislative Council of Quebec for Wellington
- In office 1931–1936
- Preceded by: Gordon Wallace Scott
- Succeeded by: Louis-Arthur Giroux

Personal details
- Born: 3 August 1865 Sainte-Pudentienne, Canada East
- Died: 13 November 1936 (aged 71) Sainte-Pudentienne, Quebec
- Party: Liberal

William Stephen Bullock (3 August 1865 – 13 November 1936) was a Canadian Baptist minister, businessman, and politician.

Born in Sainte-Pudentienne near Shefford, Canada East, the son of William Henry Bullock, a farmer, and Hanna Chartier, Bullock studied at the mission of Grande-Ligne, the Montreal Normal School, McGill University, and Andover Newton Theological School in Massachusetts. He was ordained a Baptist minister in Ottawa on 18 February 1892. He ministered in Ottawa, Maskinongé and Saint Pudentienne until 1907. He then worked as a manager and secretary of the Stanley Tool Company of Canada Limited. He was the founder of the Roxton Pond Mill Company.

He was a city council member from St. Pudentienne Village from January 1908 to January 1914. He was elected as a Liberal MLA in Shefford in 1912. He was re-elected without opposition in 1916. Again elected in 1919 and 1923 and without opposition in 1927. He did not run in 1931. He was appointed to the Legislative Council of Quebec of the division of Wellington on 15 August 1931 and served until his death in St. Pudentienne on 13 November 1936. He was buried in the Protestant cemetery of this parish on 15 November 1936.

== Personal life ==
He was married on 27 May 1890 to Ellen Evangeline Therrien (1869-1953), daughter of Alphonse Liguori Therrien, a Baptist minister, and Mary St. James. He was the father of Charles Munson Bullock, a politician, and Théodore-Lafleur Bullock.
