= Brome—Missisquoi (federal electoral district) =

Federal electoral district in Quebec, Canada

Coordinates: 45°10′N 72°45′W

Quebec electoral district
- Interactive map of riding boundaries from the 2015 federal election

Federal electoral district
- Legislature: House of Commons
MP
Louis Villeneuve
Liberal
- District created: 1924
- First contested: 1925
- Last contested: 2025
- District webpage: profile, map

Demographics
- Population (2021): 113,913
- Electors (2021): 94,460
- Area (km²): 2,779.12
- Pop. density (per km²): 41
- Census division(s): Brome-Missisquoi RCM, Memphrémagog RCM
- Census subdivision(s): Magog, Cowansville, Bromont, Farnham, Lac-Brome, Orford, Sutton, Dunham, Bedford, Brigham

Brome—Missisquoi (French pronunciation: [bʁɔm misiskwa]; formerly known as Missisquoi) is a federal electoral district in Quebec, Canada, that has been represented in the House of Commons of Canada since 1925. The original electoral district of Missiquoi existed from 1867 to 1925.

== Geography ==
This riding, in the south of the province, extends along the Canada–US border between Montreal and Sherbrooke, straddling the Quebec regions of Montérégie and Estrie. Its main towns are Cowansville, Magog, and Brome Lake.

The district includes the Regional County Municipality of Brome-Missisquoi, the municipalities of Saint-Sébastien, Henryville, Noyan, Clarenceville, Venise-en-Québec, Bromont, and the Regional County Municipality of Memphrémagog except Stanstead, Ayer's Cliff, North Hatley, Ogden, Sainte-Catherine-de-Hatley, Hatley and Stanstead Canton.

Its population in 2006 was 92,591 and the area is 3,045 km^{2}.

The neighbouring ridings are Saint-Jean, Shefford, Richmond—Arthabaska—des-Sources, and Compton—Stanstead.

== History ==
It was created in 1924 from parts of Brome, Iberville, Missisquoi and Saint-Jean ridings.

The electoral district was abolished in 1966 when it was redistributed between Missisquoi and Saint-Jean ridings. In 1970, Missisquoi was renamed "Brome—Missisquoi".

In 1976, "Brome—Missisquoi" was abolished and became part of a new "Missisquoi riding", which was renamed "Brome—Missisquoi" in 1983.

The 2012 electoral redistribution saw this riding stay mostly the same, but it lost a small fraction of territory to Shefford.

== Demographics ==
Canada census – Brome—Missisquoi community profile

	2021	2016
Population	113,913 (10.1% from 2016)	103,457 (4.9% from 2011)
Land area	2,779.12 km^{2} (1,073.02 sq mi)	2,783.46 km^{2} (1,074.70 sq mi)
Population density	41/km^{2} (110/sq mi)	37.2/km^{2} (96/sq mi)
Median age	52 (M: 51.2, F: 52.8)	50.1 (M: 49.3, F: 50.9)
Private dwellings	63,116 (total)	58,935 (total)
Median household income	$70,500	$57,192

Notes: NHS Profile, Statistics Canada
References: 2021 2016
- Average income (2020): $52,800

Visible Minorities and Aboriginals
Group	2021 Census		2016 Census	
Group	Population	% of total	Population	% of total
Indigenous	2,040	1.8	1,535	1.5
Visible Minority	2,010	1.8	1,205	1.2
All other	106,745	96.3	97,645	97.3
Total	110,790	100.0	100,385	100.0

Population by mother tongue
Group	2021 Census		2016 Census	
Group	Population	% of total	Population	% of total
English	13,820	12.3	13,585	13.4
French	92,985	82.9	83,930	82.9
English and French	2,395	2.1	1,295	1.3
English and other	130			
French and other	220			
English, French and other	95			
English total	16,440	14.7		
French total	95,965	85.3		
All other	2,530	2.7	2,490	2.4
Total	112,210	100.0	101,300	100.0

- Religion: Christian 67.9% (Catholic 58.2%, Anglican 1.9%, United Church 1.0%, Other 6.7%), None 31.3%

Mobility over previous five years
Group	2021 Census		2016 Census	
Group	Population	% of total	Population	% of total
At the same address	61,720	58.3	61,675	64.5
In the same constituency	12,160	11.5	14,255	14.9
In the same province	30,080	28.4	18,655	19.5
From another province	915	0.9	470	0.5
From another country	1,030	1.0	585	0.6
Total aged 5 or over	105,910	100.0	95,650	100.0

=== Members of Parliament ===
This riding has elected the following members of Parliament. Its current MP is Louis Villeneuve of the Liberal Party. The riding is notable for having elected six different MPs in six straight elections.

Parliament	Years	Member	Party
Brome—Missisquoi; Riding created from Brome, Iberville, Missisquoi and Saint-Jean
15th	1925–1926	William Frederic Kay	Liberal
16th	1926–1930	William Frederic Kay	Liberal
17th	1930–1935	Follin Horace Pickel	Conservative
18th	1935–1940	Louis Gosselin	Liberal
19th	1940–1945	Maurice Hallé	Liberal
20th	1945–1949	Maurice Hallé	Liberal
21st	1949–1952	Henri Gosselin	Liberal
21st	1952–1953	Joseph-Léon Deslières	Liberal
22nd	1953–1957	Joseph-Léon Deslières	Liberal
23rd	1957–1958	Joseph-Léon Deslières	Liberal
24th	1958–1962	Heward Grafftey	Progressive Conservative
25th	1962–1963	Heward Grafftey	Progressive Conservative
26th	1963–1965	Heward Grafftey	Progressive Conservative
27th	1965–1968	Heward Grafftey	Progressive Conservative
Missisquoi
28th	1968–1972	Yves Forest	Liberal
Brome—Missisquoi
29th	1972–1974	Heward Grafftey	Progressive Conservative
30th	1974–1979	Heward Grafftey	Progressive Conservative
Missisquoi
31st	1979–1980	Heward Grafftey	Progressive Conservative
32nd	1980–1984	André Bachand	Liberal
Brome—Missisquoi
33rd	1984–1988	Gabrielle Bertrand	Progressive Conservative
34th	1988–1993	Gabrielle Bertrand	Progressive Conservative
35th	1993–1994	Gaston Péloquin	Bloc Québécois
35th	1995–1997	Denis Paradis	Liberal
36th	1997–2000	Denis Paradis	Liberal
37th	2000–2004	Denis Paradis	Liberal
38th	2004–2006	Denis Paradis	Liberal
39th	2006–2008	Christian Ouellet	Bloc Québécois
40th	2008–2011	Christian Ouellet	Bloc Québécois
41st	2011–2015	Pierre Jacob	New Democratic
42nd	2015–2019	Denis Paradis	Liberal
43rd	2019–2021	Lyne Bessette	Liberal
44th	2021–2025	Pascale St-Onge	Liberal
45th	2025–present	Louis Villeneuve	Liberal

== Election results ==
Graph of election results in Brome—Missisquoi(1924-1966), Missisquoi(1966-1970), Brome—Missisquoi(1970-1976), Missisquoi(1976-1983), and Brome—Missisquoi (1983-present) (1924-, minor parties that never got 2% of the vote or didn't run consistently are omitted)

=== Brome—Missisquoi, 1984 - present ===
Graph of election results in Brome—Missisquoi (1983-, minor parties that never got 2% of the vote or didn't run consistently are omitted)

2025 Canadian federal election
Party	Candidate	Votes	%	±%	Expenditures
Liberal	Louis Villeneuve	34,727	48.26	+13.31	$63,899.89
Bloc Québécois	Jeff Boudreault	20,182	28.05	–6.59	$40,166.16
Conservative	Steve Charbonneau	13,743	19.10	+2.90	$83,948.48
New Democratic	Zoé Larose	1,600	2.22	–4.00	$0.00
Green	Michelle Corcos	1,139	1.58	–0.80	$0.00
People's	Jack McLeod	561	0.78	–2.44	$560.00
Total valid votes/expense limit		71,952	98.78	+0.56	$145,183.34
Total rejected ballots		888	1.22	–0.56	
Turnout		72,840	72.46	+6.39	
Eligible voters (Note: Number of eligible voters does not include election day registrations.)		100,527			
Liberal hold		Swing		+9.95	
Source: Elections Canada

2021 Canadian federal election
Party	Candidate	Votes	%	±%	Expenditures
Liberal	Pascale St-Onge	21,488	34.96	-3.2	$39,303.15
Bloc Québécois	Marilou Alarie	21,291	34.64	+0.2	$33,184.64
Conservative	Vincent Duhamel	9,961	16.20	+3.7	$94,614.82
New Democratic	Andrew Panton	3,828	6.23	-1.8	$0.45
People's	Alexis Stogowski	1,982	3.22	+2.5	$0.00
Green	Michelle Corcos	1,466	2.38	-3.0	$0.00
Free	Maryse Richard	961	1.56	N/A	$914.14
Veterans Coalition	Lawrence Cotton	215	0.35	+0.1	$0.00
Independent	Dany Desjardins	145	0.24	N/A	$0.00
Christian Heritage	Susanne Lefebvre	133	0.22	N/A	$2.403.25
Total valid votes/expense limit		61,471	98.22	–	$112,117.88
Total rejected ballots		1,115	1.78		
Turnout		62,586	66.07		
Registered voters		94,728			
Liberal hold		Swing		-1.5	
Source: Elections Canada

2019 Canadian federal election
Party	Candidate	Votes	%	±%	Expenditures
Liberal	Lyne Bessette	23,450	38.2	-5.68	none listed
Bloc Québécois	Monique Allard	21,152	34.4	+16.93	$19,373.49
Conservative	Bruno Côté	7,697	12.5	+1.04	$17,284.00
New Democratic	Sylvie Jetté	4,887	8.0	-16.51	$7,266.26
Green	Normand Dallaire	3,302	5.4	+3.05	$8,943.15
People's	François Poulin	456	0.7		none listed
Rhinoceros	Steeve Cloutier	310	0.5		none listed
Veterans Coalition	Lawrence Cotton	187	0.3	$0.00	
Total valid votes/expense limit		61,441	100.0		
Total rejected ballots		962			
Turnout		62,403	70.1		
Eligible voters		89,071			
Liberal hold		Swing		-11.31	
Source: Elections Canada

2015 Canadian federal election
Party	Candidate	Votes	%	±%	Expenditures
Liberal	Denis Paradis	25,744	43.88	+21.82	$77,834.79
New Democratic	Catherine Lusson	14,383	24.51	-18.13	$45,044.04
Bloc Québécois	Patrick Melchior	10,252	17.47	-3.79	$48,371.40
Conservative	Charles Poulin	6,724	11.46	-0.45	–
Green	Cindy Moynan	1,377	2.35	+0.22	–
Strength in Democracy	Patrick Paine	195	0.33	–	$639.88
Total valid votes/Expense limit		58,675	98.8		$223,312.02
Total rejected ballots		716	1.2	–	
Turnout		59,391	69.71	–	
Eligible voters		85,201			
Liberal gain from New Democratic		Swing		+19.98	
Source: Elections Canada

2011 federal election redistributed results
Party	Vote	%
New Democratic	22,404	42.64
Liberal	11,588	22.06
Bloc Québécois	11,171	21.26
Conservative	6,256	11.91
Green	1,120	2.13

2011 Canadian federal election
Party	Candidate	Votes	%	±%	Expenditures
New Democratic	Pierre Jacob	22,407	42.64	+33.59	
Liberal	Denis Paradis	11,589	22.06	-10.73	
Bloc Québécois	Christelle Bogosta	11,173	21.26	-13.95	
Conservative	Nolan LeBlanc-Bauerle	6,256	11.91	-6.75	
Green	Benoit Lambert	1,120	2.13	-1.45	
Total valid votes/Expense limit		52,545	100.00		
Total rejected ballots		588	1.05	–	
Turnout		53,133	66.30	–	
Eligible voters		80,137	–	–	
New Democratic gain from Bloc Québécois		Swing		+23.77	

2008 Canadian federal election
Party	Candidate	Votes	%	±%	Expenditures
Bloc Québécois	Christian Ouellet	17,561	35.21	-3.13	$77,380
Liberal	Denis Paradis	16,357	32.79	+4.82	$65,529
Conservative	Mark Quinlan	9,309	18.66	-1.69	$78,614
New Democratic	Christelle Bogosta	4,514	9.05	+5.85	$4,678
Green	Pierre Brassard	1,784	3.58	+0.02	
Independent	David Marler	354	0.71	–	$16,915
Total valid votes/Expense limit		49,879	100.00	$83,303	
Bloc Québécois hold		Swing		-3.98	

2006 Canadian federal election
Party	Candidate	Votes	%	±%	Expenditures
Bloc Québécois	Christian Ouellet	18,596	38.33	-1.33	$66,756
Liberal	Denis Paradis	13,569	27.97	-14.12	$58,065
Conservative	David Marler	9,874	20.35	+9.30	$70,771
New Democratic	Josianne Jetté	2,839	5.85	+3.19	$1,497
Progressive Canadian	Heward Grafftey	1,921	3.96	–	$69,065
Green	Michel Champagne	1,721	3.55	-1.00	$2,460
Total valid votes/Expense limit		48,520	100.00	$76,646	
Bloc Québécois gain from Liberal		Swing		+6.40	

2004 Canadian federal election
Party	Candidate	Votes	%	±%	Expenditures
Liberal	Denis Paradis	18,609	42.08	-8.18	$56,786
Bloc Québécois	Christian Ouellet	17,537	39.66	+8.49	$29,221
Conservative	Peter Stastny	4,888	11.05	-6.40	$20,193
Green	Louise Martineau	2,011	4.55	–	
New Democratic	Piper Huggins	1,177	2.66	+1.54	$5
Total valid votes/Expense limit		44,222	100.00	$74,138	
Liberal hold		Swing		-8.34	

Note: Conservative vote is compared to the total of the Canadian Alliance vote and Progressive Conservative vote in 2000 election.

2000 Canadian federal election
Party	Candidate	Votes	%	±%
Liberal	Denis Paradis	21,545	50.26	+7.89
Bloc Québécois	André Leroux	13,363	31.17	+3.34
Progressive Conservative	Heward Grafftey	5,502	12.84	-15.25
Alliance	Jacques Loyer	1,977	4.61	
New Democratic	Jeff Itcush	480	1.12	-0.60
Total valid votes		42,867	100.00	
Liberal hold		Swing		+2.28

1997 Canadian federal election
Party	Candidate	Votes	%	±%
Liberal	Denis Paradis	19,261	42.37	-8.66
Progressive Conservative	Claude Boulard	12,770	28.09	+24.79
Bloc Québécois	Noël Lacasse	12,652	27.83	-14.33
New Democratic	Nicole Guillemet	781	1.72	+0.73
Total valid votes		45,464	100.00	

Canadian federal by-election, 13 February 1995
Party	Candidate	Votes	%	±%
Péloquin's death, 1 September 1994
Liberal	Denis Paradis	19,078	51.02	+14.18
Bloc Québécois	Jean-François Bertrand	15,764	42.16	+1.58
Progressive Conservative	Guy Lever	1,235	3.30	-13.87
Reform	Line Maheux	517	1.38	
New Democratic	Paul Vachon	371	0.99	-0.26
Christian Heritage	Jean Blaquière	126	0.34	
Independent	Yvon V. Boulanger	107	0.29	
Green	Eric Ferland	101	0.27	
Natural Law	Michel Champagne	77	0.21	-1.08
Abolitionist	John H. Long	15	0.04	-1.62
Total valid votes		37,391	100.00	

1993 Canadian federal election
Party	Candidate	Votes	%	±%
Bloc Québécois	Gaston Péloquin	17,894	40.58	
Liberal	Joan Kouri	16,243	36.84	+3.95
Progressive Conservative	Francine Vincelette	7,571	17.17	-36.80
Abolitionist	Jean Guy Peloquin	733	1.66	
Natural Law	Yves Décarie	566	1.28	
New Democratic	Sean Hutchinson	550	1.25	-11.90
Independent	Gary Wightman	381	0.86	
National	Edmond Séguin	154	0.35	
Total valid votes		44,092	100.00	

1988 Canadian federal election
Party	Candidate	Votes	%	±%
Progressive Conservative	Gabrielle Bertrand	22,540	53.97	+0.91
Liberal	André Bachand	13,733	32.88	-5.53
New Democratic	Paul Vachon	5,489	13.14	+7.58
Total valid votes		41,762	100.00	

1984 Canadian federal election
Party	Candidate	Votes	%	±%
Progressive Conservative	Gabrielle Bertrand	21,678	53.07	+12.20
Liberal	André Bachand	15,693	38.42	-14.67
New Democratic	Gordon J. Hamilton	2,271	5.56	+1.56
Parti nationaliste	Yvon Bélair	997	2.44	
Libertarian	David Chamberlain	116	0.28	
Commonwealth of Canada	Michel Boissonnault	96	0.24	
Total valid votes		40,851	100.00	

=== Missisquoi, 1979 - 1984 ===
Graph of election results in Missisquoi (1976-1983, minor parties that never got 2% of the vote or didn't run consistently are omitted)

1980 Canadian federal election
Party	Candidate	Votes	%	±%
Liberal	André Bachand	20,022	53.08	+9.83
Progressive Conservative	Heward Grafftey	15,413	40.86	-7.18
New Democratic	Gertrude Lefebvre-Brown	1,508	4.00	+1.38
Rhinoceros	Pierre Screwdriver Gingras	687	1.82	
Marxist–Leninist	Myriam Portatia	89	0.24	
Total valid votes		37,719	100.00	

1979 Canadian federal election
Party	Candidate	Votes	%	±%
Progressive Conservative	Heward Grafftey	18,198	48.04	-3.57
Liberal	Gisèle V. Noël	16,383	43.25	+7.49
Social Credit	Rolland Cordeau	2,097	5.54	-3.99
New Democratic	Gertrude Lefebvre-Brown	991	2.62	-0.49
Union populaire	Marcel Forand	212	0.56	
Total valid votes		37,881	100.00	

=== Brome—Missisquoi, 1972 - 1979 ===
Graph of election results in Brome—Missisquoi (1970-1976, minor parties that never got 2% of the vote or didn't run consistently are omitted)

1974 Canadian federal election
Party	Candidate	Votes	%	±%
Progressive Conservative	Heward Grafftey	19,490	51.61	+10.13
Liberal	C. Peter Turner	13,506	35.76	+3.40
Social Credit	J.-Marc Duchesneau	3,597	9.52	-14.52
New Democratic	Brian Peters	1,172	3.10	+0.99
Total valid votes		37,765	100.00	

1972 Canadian federal election
Party	Candidate	Votes	%	±%
Progressive Conservative	Heward Grafftey	15,593	41.48	+3.25
Liberal	Yves Forest	12,165	32.36	-9.79
Social Credit	Jean-Paul Lasnier	9,038	24.04	-14.19
New Democratic	Jean-Guy Lewis	795	2.11	-14.88
Total valid votes		37,591	100.00	

Note: Social Credit vote is compared to Ralliement créditiste vote in the 1968 election.

=== Missisquoi, 1968 - 1972 ===
1968 Canadian federal election
Party	Candidate	Votes	%	±%
Liberal	Yves Forest	12,905	42.15	+3.28
Progressive Conservative	Heward W. Grafftey	11,705	38.23	-11.76
Ralliement créditiste	Roméo Custeau	5,205	17.00	+11.23
New Democratic	Willie Fortin	803	2.62	-2.75
Total valid votes		30,618	100.00	

=== Brome—Missisquoi, 1925 - 1968 ===
Graph of election results in Brome—Missisquoi (1924-1966, minor parties that never got 2% of the vote or didn't run consistently are omitted)

1965 Canadian federal election
Party	Candidate	Votes	%	±%
Progressive Conservative	Heward Grafftey	9,662	49.99	+5.34
Liberal	Jean-Louis Cardin	7,512	38.86	+1.15
Ralliement créditiste	Hervé Lapointe	1,116	5.77	-7.33
New Democratic	James Walker Dawson	1,039	5.38	+0.83
Total valid votes		19,329	100.00	

Note: Ralliement créditiste vote is compared to Social Credit vote in the 1963 election.

1963 Canadian federal election
Party	Candidate	Votes	%	±%
Progressive Conservative	Heward Grafftey	8,411	44.64	+2.81
Liberal	Léo Duquette	7,105	37.71	-1.81
Social Credit	Normand Ruel	2,468	13.10	-5.54
New Democratic	Giles Bisson	856	4.54	
Total valid votes		18,840	100.00	

1962 Canadian federal election
Party	Candidate	Votes	%	±%
Progressive Conservative	Heward Grafftey	8,074	41.83	-19.73
Liberal	Marc Hudon	7,629	39.53	+1.09
Social Credit	Normand Ruel	3,598	18.64	
Total valid votes		19,301	100.00	

1958 Canadian federal election
Party	Candidate	Votes	%	±%
Progressive Conservative	Heward Grafftey	11,361	61.56	+13.38
Liberal	Maurice Halle	7,093	38.44	-13.38
Total valid votes		18,454	100.00	

1957 Canadian federal election
Party	Candidate	Votes	%	±%
Liberal	Joseph-Léon Deslières	9,255	51.82	-11.51
Progressive Conservative	William Heward Grafftey	8,605	48.18	+19.42
Total valid votes		17,860	100.00	

1953 Canadian federal election
Party	Candidate	Votes	%	±%
Liberal	Joseph-Léon Deslières	9,362	63.33	+7.55
Progressive Conservative	Vincent de Lourdes Leonard	4,252	28.76	-11.20
Co-operative Commonwealth	Philip Borgan	1,168	7.90	+3.65
Total valid votes		14,782	100.00	

By-election on 26 May 1952 On Mr. Gosselin's death, 27 January 1952
Party	Candidate	Votes	%	±%
Liberal	Joseph-Léon Deslières	8,394	55.79	-0.19
Progressive Conservative	Henri Demers	6,013	39.96	+0.25
Co-operative Commonwealth	Philip Borgan	640	4.25	
Total valid votes		15,047	100.00	

1949 Canadian federal election
Party	Candidate	Votes	%	±%
Liberal	Henri A. Gosselin	8,831	55.97	+5.04
Progressive Conservative	Vincent de Lourdes Leonard	6,266	39.71	+12.70
Union des électeurs	Georges-Aimé Chevalier	402	2.55	
Co-operative Commonwealth	Georges-M. St Amour	279	1.77	+0.17
Total valid votes		15,778	100.00	

1945 Canadian federal election
Party	Candidate	Votes	%	±%
Liberal	Maurice Halle	7,860	50.93	-24.89
Progressive Conservative	Floyd E. Johnson	4,169	27.02	+2.84
Bloc populaire	Maurice Archambault	3,087	20.00	
Co-operative Commonwealth	William Henry Freder Jones	246	1.59	
Farmer (independent)	Edward Vivian de Lér Orr	70	0.45	
Total valid votes		15,432	100.00	

Note: Progressive Conservative vote is compared to "National Government" vote in 1940 election.

1940 Canadian federal election
Party	Candidate	Votes	%	±%
Liberal	Maurice Halle	8,302	75.82	+22.55
National Government	Daniel James Murphy	2,647	24.18	-22.55
Total valid votes		10,949	100.00	

Note: "National Government" vote is compared to Conservative vote in 1935 election.

1935 Canadian federal election
Party	Candidate	Votes	%	±%
Liberal	Louis Gosselin	8,007	53.27	+8.34
Conservative	Follin Horace Pickel	7,024	46.73	-8.34
Total valid votes		15,031	100.00	

1930 Canadian federal election
Party	Candidate	Votes	%	±%
Conservative	Follin Horace Pickel	8,070	55.07	+9.34
Liberal	William Frederic Kay	6,584	44.93	-9.34
Total valid votes		14,654	100.00	

1926 Canadian federal election
Party	Candidate	Votes	%	±%
Liberal	William Frederic Kay	7,126	54.27	-2.43
Conservative	Follin Horace Pickel	6,005	45.73	+2.43
Total valid votes		13,131	100.00	

1925 Canadian federal election
Party	Candidate	Votes	%
Liberal	William Frederic Kay	6,804	56.70
Conservative	Follin Horace Pickel	5,196	43.30
Total valid votes		12,000	100.00

== See also ==
- List of Canadian electoral districts
- Historical federal electoral districts of Canada
