= Gabrielle Bertrand =

Gabrielle Bertrand may refer to:

- Gabrielle Bertrand (painter) (1737‍–‍1802), French-Austrian pastel artist in the Viennese court
- Gabrielle Bertrand (politician) (1923‍–‍1999), former member of the Progressive Conservative Party of Canada

== See also ==
- Gabriel Bertrand (1867‍–‍1962), French pharmacologist and biochemist
