= Antonio Flamand =

Canadian politician

Member of the National Assembly of Quebec for Rouyn-Noranda
- In office 1966–1970
- Preceded by: Edgar Turpin
- Succeeded by: Camil Samson

Personal details
- Born: June 28, 1933 (age 92) Saint-Honoré, Quebec, Canada
- Party: Union Nationale

Antonio Flamand (born June 28, 1933) was a nationalist politician in Quebec, Canada.

== Background ==
He was born on June 28, 1933, in Saint-Honoré, Saguenay–Lac-Saint-Jean. He moved to Rouyn-Noranda and made a career in accounting and education.

== Member of the legislature ==
Flamand won a seat in the National Assembly of Quebec in 1966 in the district of Rouyn-Noranda and was a member of the Union Nationale. In 1969 though, he left his party and sat as an Independent to protest against the passage of Bill 63. He did not run for re-election in 1970.

== City politics and retirement ==
He served as a city councillor in Rouyn from 1971 to 1973.

Flamand ran as a Parti Québécois candidate in 1973, but lost against Ralliement créditiste Leader Camil Samson.
