= Abolitionist Party of Canada =

- Former federal party
- Leader: John Turmel; Only leader
- Founded: 1993
- Dissolved: 1996
- Ideology: Social credit; Monetary reform
- Colours: Light Yellow

Website
- www.cyberclass.net/turmel/abprogs.htm

The Abolitionist Party of Canada was a Canadian political party founded by perennial candidate John Turmel. The party ran on a platform of monetary reform, including the abolition of interest rates and the income tax; the use of the local employment trading system of banking; and introducing a form of Social Credit with monthly dividends being paid out to each Canadian.

Unlike many Canadian social credit parties, the Abolitionists were not social conservatives; for instance, the party advocated for the legalization of both marijuana and gambling.

Turmel attempted to run for the leadership of the national Social Credit party after the resignation of Fabien Roy in 1981, but the party chose to appoint Martin Hattersley instead. In 1982, Turmel founded the Christian Credit Party, which he disbanded in 1983.

Turmel founded the Abolitionist Party in 1993 with a similar program to that of the Christian Credit Party. The Abolitionist Party nominated 80 candidates in the 1993 federal election, who collected only 9,141 votes between them. (See also: Abolitionist Party candidates, 1993 Canadian federal election.) The Abolitionist Party subsequently reverted to being a personal vehicle for Turmel.

In 2003, Turmel attempted to organize a new party using the name of the defunct Libertarian Party of Canada, but was prevented from doing so by old members of the Libertarian Party who registered the name.

== See also ==
- List of political parties in Canada
