= André Bachand (Liberal MP) =

Canadian politician

Member of the Canadian Parliament for Missisquoi
- In office 1980–1984
- Preceded by: Heward Grafftey
- Succeeded by: Riding redistributed into Brome—Missisquoi

Personal details
- Born: June 15, 1934 (age 92) Roxton Falls, Quebec, Canada
- Party: Liberal
- Occupation: lawyer

André Bachand (born June 15, 1934) is a former Canadian politician and lawyer.

Born in Roxton Falls, Quebec, Canada, Bachand was elected to the House of Commons of Canada as a member of the Liberal Party in the 1980 election to represent the riding of Missisquoi. He sat on numerous House standing committees including chair of the House Standing Committee on Labour, Manpower and Immigration and served as Parliamentary Secretary to the Ministry of Agriculture standing joint committees Standing Joint Committee on the Library of Parliament, Standing Joint Committee on the Restaurant of Parliament and the Standing Joint Committee on Regulations and other Statutory Instruments. Prior to entering federal politics, he served in the Canadian Officers' Training Corps as second lieutenant between 1956 and 1958.
