= Cowansville =

- City
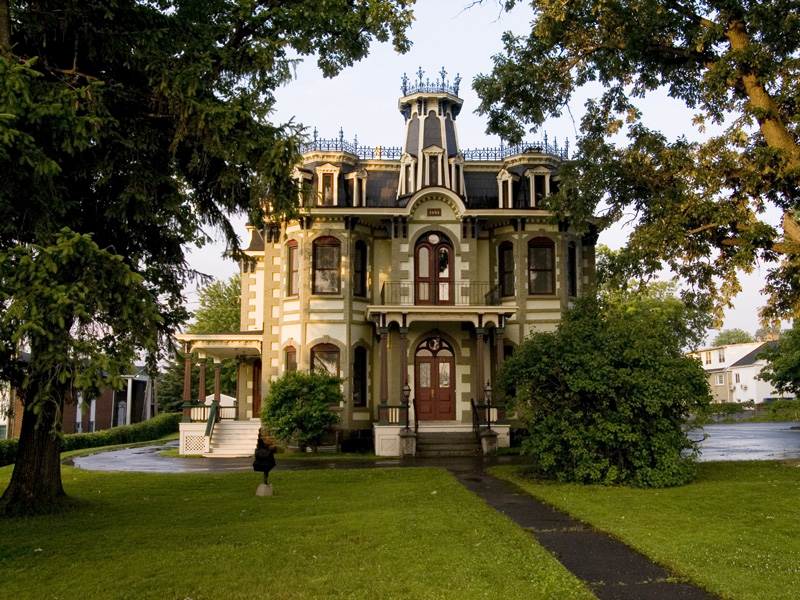
- Nesbitt House, Cowansville

- Coat of arms
- Motto: Fortitudo et decor
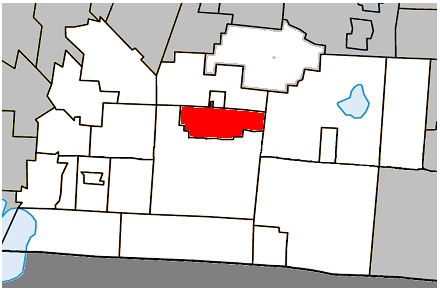
- Location within Brome-Missisquoi RCM

- Location in southern Quebec
- Coordinates: 45°12′16″N 72°44′27″W
- Country: Canada
- Province: Quebec
- Region: Estrie
- RCM: Brome-Missisquoi
- Settled: 1798
- Constituted: January 1, 1876
- City status: June 25, 1931

Government
  - Mayor: Sylvie Beauregard
  - Federal riding: Brome—Missisquoi
  - Prov. riding: Brome-Missisquoi

Area
  - City: 48.70 km^{2} (18.80 sq mi)
  - Land: 46.87 km^{2} (18.10 sq mi)
  - Urban: 16.35 km^{2} (6.31 sq mi)

Population (2021)
  - City: 15,234
  - Density: 325/km^{2} (840/sq mi)
  - Urban: 13,334
  - Urban density: 815.3/km^{2} (2,112/sq mi)
  - Pop 2016-2021: ▲11.6%
  - Dwellings: 7,247
- Time zone: UTC−5 (EST)
  - Summer (DST): UTC−4 (EDT)
- Postal code: J2K
- Area codes: 354, 450 and 579
- Highways: R-104; R-139; R-202; R-241
- Geocode: 46080
- Website: www.cowansville.ca

Cowansville is a city in the Estrie region of Quebec, Canada, and the administrative seat of the Brome-Missisquoi Regional County Municipality. It lies on the Yamaska South-East River and Lac Davignon, about 20 kilometres (12 mi) north of the United States border. Its population was 15,234 in the 2021 Canadian census.

Jacob Ruiter settled at the site in 1798 and built a flour mill and sawmill there two years later. Cowansville was incorporated as a village in 1876 and received city status in 1931. Bruck Silk Mills opened in 1922 and became one of the city's largest industrial employers during the 20th century.

== Toponymy ==
The settlement was first known as Nelsonville, after British naval officer Horatio Nelson. The Commission de toponymie du Québec records Nelsonville as the usual name from the early 19th century until about 1845. Churchville, after local merchant John Church, was also used for part of the settlement during the 1830s.

A post office opened in 1841 under the name Cowansville. The name honours Peter Cowan, a Scottish merchant who had settled in the area with his brother Andrew in 1836. The different name for the post office avoided confusion with Nelson in Upper Canada. Cowansville gradually replaced the older names and became the official municipal name when the village was incorporated in 1876.

== History ==
Archaeological research in the wider Brome-Missisquoi region has documented Indigenous activity dating back about 5,000 years, including sites from the Archaic and Woodland periods. The Yamaska River also has an Indigenous name history; Cowansville's municipal heritage material records the Abenaki form Ouabmaska.

Jacob Ruiter, the son of a Loyalist from New York, settled at the present site of Cowansville in 1798. He built a flour mill and sawmill on the Yamaska River in 1800, near the present South Street bridge.

The first South Eastern Railway train arrived in Cowansville on November 26, 1870. A branch of the Eastern Townships Bank opened during the same decade. The village of Cowansville was incorporated on January 1, 1876. Its first council was elected the following month, with James O'Halloran as mayor.

Industry expanded during the early 20th century. Among the manufacturers established in Cowansville were W. F. Vilas, J. J. Barker, Footwear Findings and Bruck Silk Mills.

Bruck's Cowansville plant opened in 1922 with 14 looms and about 30 workers. On July 21 of that year it produced the first full-width silk yardage woven in Canada. The company later became one of Cowansville's largest employers. In 1964, Bruck produced confidential prototypes for the new Canadian Maple Leaf flag and prepared to manufacture the flag before the final design had been adopted.

Cowansville received city status on June 25, 1931.

On December 3, 1944, a fire destroyed 25 businesses in downtown Cowansville. Firefighters from Montreal, Saint-Jean, Farnham and Granby joined the local brigade. Telephone and utility services were disrupted, and both of the town's pharmacies were among the businesses lost.

Cowansville annexed part of the municipality of Dunham in 1963. In 1964 it annexed part, and later all, of the neighbouring village of Sweetsburg.

== Geography ==
Cowansville has a land area of 46.87 km². The Yamaska South-East River crosses the municipality and flows through Lac Davignon, an artificial reservoir near the centre of the city.

Lac Davignon covers 1.05 km² and has about 9 km of shoreline. Its average depth is 3.6 m and its maximum depth is 9.2 m. Work on the dam began in 1965, and the new reservoir was in place by 1966. It was officially named Lac Davignon in 1971, after Abbé Davignon, the founding priest of Sainte-Thérèse-de-l'Enfant-Jésus parish. The reservoir supplies Cowansville with drinking water and is also used for recreation.

The MRC's landscape classification places Cowansville near the transition between the Appalachian foothills and the ridges-and-trenches landscape extending south toward Dunham and Frelighsburg.

== Demographics ==
Historical Census Data - Cowansville, Quebec
Year	Pop.	±%
1881	573	—
1891	639	+11.5%
1901	699	+9.4%
1911	881	+26.0%
1921	1,094	+24.2%
1931	1,859	+69.9%
1941	3,486	+87.5%
1951	4,431	+27.1%
1956	5,242	+18.3%
1961	7,050	+34.5%
1966	10,692	+51.7%
1971	11,920	+11.5%
1976	11,902	−0.2%
1981	12,240	+2.8%
1986	11,643	−4.9%
1991	11,982	+2.9%
1996	12,051	+0.6%
2001	12,032	−0.2%
2006	12,182	+1.2%
2011	12,489	+2.5%
2016	13,656	+9.3%
2021	15,234	+11.6%

Municipal boundaries changed during the period shown. Cowansville annexed part of Dunham in 1963 and part, then all, of Sweetsburg in 1964.

In the 2021 Census of Population conducted by Statistics Canada, Cowansville had a population of 15,234 living in 6,980 of its 7,247 total private dwellings, a change of 11.6% from its 2016 population of 13,656. With a land area of 46.87 km^{2} (18.10 sq mi), it had a population density of 325.0/km^{2} (841.8/sq mi) in 2021.

Canada census – Cowansville community profile

	2021	2016	2011
Population	15,234 (+11.6% from 2016)	13,656 (+9.3% from 2011)	12,489 (+2.5% from 2006)
Land area	46.87 km^{2} (18.10 sq mi)	46.89 km^{2} (18.10 sq mi)	46.09 km^{2} (17.80 sq mi)
Population density	325/km^{2} (840/sq mi)	291.2/km^{2} (754/sq mi)	271.0/km^{2} (702/sq mi)
Median age	48.8 (M: 46.0, F: 51.6)	46.2 (M: 43.7, F: 49.0)	45.5 (M: 43.2, F: 47.5)
Private dwellings	7,247 (total) 6,980 (occupied)	6,272 (total)	5,789 (total)
Median household income	$58,800	$49,508	$43,252

References: 2021 2016 2011

Canada Census Mother Tongue - Cowansville, Quebec
Census	Total	French			English			French & English			Other		
Year	Responses	Count	Trend	Pop %	Count	Trend	Pop %	Count	Trend	Pop %	Count	Trend	Pop %
2021	14,460	11,485	▲11.3%	79.4%	2,140	▲6.2%	14.8%	455	▲89.6%	3.1%	290	▲34.9%	2.0%
2016	12,810	10,315	▲5.5%	80.5%	2,015	▲2.3%	15.7%	240	▲23.1%	1.9%	215	▲13.2%	1.7%
2011	12,135	9,780	▲2.6%	80.6%	1,970	▲15.5%	16.2%	195	▲25.8%	1.6%	190	▼7.3%	1.6%
2006	11,600	9,535	▲0.6%	82.2%	1,705	▲10.7%	14.7%	155	▼18.4%	1.3%	205	▲156.2%	1.8%
2001	11,290	9,480	▲5.9%	84.0%	1,540	▼17.9%	13.6%	190	▼19.1%	1.7%	80	▼44.8%	0.7%
1996	11,205	8,950	n/a	79.9%	1,875	n/a	16.7%	235	n/a	2.1%	145	n/a	1.3%

== Built heritage ==
The Nesbitt House was built in 1881 for businessman George Knight Nesbitt, a member of Cowansville's first municipal council and mayor from 1877 to 1879. The brick residence is an example of Second Empire architecture and is the only surviving residential building of that style in Cowansville. Nesbitt also owned the local grain mill; generators installed there in 1891 and 1892 supplied Cowansville's first system of electric street lights.

Maison Bruck was built in 1874 as a branch of the Eastern Townships Bank and as the residence of its manager. Industrialist William F. Vilas bought the building in 1909. Bruck Silk Mills acquired it in 1941 and used it for employee training, meetings and social functions. The building passed to the municipality in 1979 and now houses the Musée Bruck.

== Culture ==
The Musée Bruck is housed in the former Eastern Townships Bank building on Principale Street. Its Bruck-Lee collection was established in 1956 and contains Canadian art, including works associated with the Beaver Hall Group. The museum also presents exhibitions on Cowansville's industrial history and contemporary visual and textile art.

== Government ==
Cowansville is governed by a mayor and six councillors, each representing an electoral district. Sylvie Beauregard was returned as mayor in the November 2025 municipal election.

District	Councillor
1	Simon Angers
2	Alain Daigle
3	Renée Fortin
4	Stéphane Lussier
5	Nathalie Haman
6	Amélie Fournier

== Education ==
Cowansville has both French- and English-language public schools. Secondary education is provided by the French-language École secondaire Massey-Vanier and the English-language Massey-Vanier High School. The English school serves students from communities across Brome-Missisquoi and neighbouring areas.

Campus Brome-Missisquoi, on Adélard-Godbout Street, is a bilingual vocational-training centre offering programs in trades, food services, administration and other fields.

== Public institutions ==
The Brome-Missisquoi-Perkins Hospital traces its origins to 1910, when local physicians and residents purchased the former American House hotel for conversion into a hospital. The District of Bedford General Hospital opened in 1911 and adopted the Brome-Missisquoi-Perkins name in 1931 following a bequest from Edward C. Perkins.

Cowansville Institution is a federal medium-security correctional facility operated by the Correctional Service of Canada. It opened in 1966 and has a rated capacity of 599.

The Cowansville courthouse is one of the courthouses serving the Bedford judicial district.

== Transportation ==
Route 104, Route 139, Route 202 and Route 241 pass through Cowansville.

Public transit includes a municipal loop bus and taxibus service. The MRC de Brome-Missisquoi also operates an on-demand regional service connecting 20 municipalities with Cowansville. The Brome–Yamaska interregional bus route, introduced in August 2025, connects Cowansville with Bromont, Granby, Saint-Alphonse-de-Granby and East Farnham.

Historically, the South Eastern Railway reached Cowansville in 1870.

== Notable people ==
- George Harold Baker (1877–1916), lawyer, soldier and Conservative member of the House of Commons of Canada
- Faith Fyles (1875–1961), botanist and botanical illustrator
- Colin Nixon, filmmaker
- Max Parrot, Olympic champion snowboarder

== See also ==
- List of anglophone communities in Quebec
- List of cities in Quebec
