= List of political parties in Quebec =

The following is a list of all political parties in the Canadian province of Quebec.

== Parties represented in the National Assembly ==
Name	Founded	Ideology	Leader	Membership	MNAs
Parti Québécois	1968	Quebec sovereignty, Quebec nationalism, social democracy, economic nationalism	Paul St-Pierre Plamondon	40,000 (2026)	60 / 125
Quebec Liberal Party; Parti libéral du Québec	1867	Quebec federalism, economic liberalism, liberalism	Charles Milliard	25,000 (2026)	39 / 125
Conservative Party of Quebec; Parti conservateur du Québec	2009	Conservatism, Quebec federalism, fiscal conservatism	Éric Duhaime	65,000 (2026)	19 / 125
Québec solidaire	2006	Quebec sovereignty, democratic socialism, environmentalism	Ruba Ghazal & Sol Zanetti (co-spokespersons)	20,000 (2026)	9 / 125

== Other registered parties ==
Other parties authorized by the Director-General of Elections:

Name	Founded	Ideology	Leader	Membership
Bloc pot	1998	Legalization of marijuana	Jean-Patrick Berthiaume	350 (2025)
Coalition Avenir Québec	2011	Quebec nationalism, Quebec federalism, national conservatism, economic liberalism	Mathieu Lévesque (interim)	20,576 (2026)
Canadian Party of Quebec	2022	Quebec federalism, Official bilingualism, Canadian nationalism, Anglophone interests	Joseph Cianflone	
Climat Québec	2021	Environmentalism, Quebec sovereigntism	Martine Ouellet	
Équipe autonomiste	2012	Quebec autonomism	Steve Thérion (interim)	
Green Party of Quebec	2001	Green politics	Alex Tyrrell	1,148 (2020)
Marxist–Leninist Party of Quebec	1989	Marxism–Leninism	Christine Dandenault (interim)	
Parti culinaire du Québec	2018	"Gastronocracy"	Jean-Louis Thémis	
Parti nul	2009	Abstentionism	Renaud Blais	
Alliance pour la famille et les communautés	2022	Electoral reform, family rights	Alain Rioux	
Démocratie directe	2022	Direct democracy	Jean Charles Cléroux	
L'union fait la force / Unity is Strength	2022	Direct democracy	Georges Samman	
Parti animal Québec / Québec Animal Party	2020	Animal Rights		
Parti communiste du Québec	1965	Marxism-Leninism	Adrien Welsh	
Parti libertarien du Québec	2022	Libertarianism	Charles Olivier	
Parti populaire du Québec	2026	Right-wing	Sylvain Pariseau	107 (2026)
Parti pour l'indépendance du Québec	2019	Quebec sovereigntism	Jacinthe Lafrenaye	
Québec intégrité / Integrity Québec	2022		Nancy Rochon	
Québécois unis pour l'égalité / Quebecers United for Equality	2022	Against Bill 96	Irwin Rapoport	
Union nationale	2020	Environmentalism, Health care reform	Jonathan Blanchette	

== Unregistered parties ==
- Gauche Socialiste (never registered)

== Historical parties that won seats in the National or Legislative Assembly ==
- Action démocratique du Québec 1994–2012
- Action libérale nationale 1934–c. 1939
- Bloc Populaire Canadien 1943–1949
- Ligue nationaliste canadienne 1908–1916
- Fédération du Commonwealth Coopératif (CCF) 1939–1955
- Parti ouvrier 1890–1931
- Parti conservateur du Québec 1850–1935
- Parti égalité/Equality Party 1990–2013
- Parti créditiste or Ralliement créditiste du Québec 1970–1990 (various names)
- Parti national populaire 1975–1979
- Union Nationale 1935–1989 (known as Unité-Québec 1971–1973)

=== Pre-Confederation ===
- Parti britannique
- Parti bureaucrate
- Parti bleu
- Parti canadien
- Parti patriote
- Parti rouge
- Parti tory

== Other historical parties that held seats in the National or Legislative Assembly ==
- Parti nationaliste chrétien 1968–1969
- Les Démocrates 1978–1979
- Parti démocrate créditiste 1980
- Option nationale 2011–2017

== Other historical parties that nominated candidates ==
- Bloc Montréal 2022–2026
- New Democratic Party of Quebec 2014–2024
- Parti communiste du Québec 1921–2002
- Parti ouvrier-progressiste 1943–1959
- Union des électeurs 1944–1948
- Parti social-démocratique 1955–1959
- Parti républicain du Québec 1962–1964
- Parti socialiste du Québec 1963–1968
- Nouveau Parti démocratique du Québec 1963–1994
- Rassemblement pour l'indépendance nationale 1964–1968
- Ralliement national 1965–1968
- Parti Rhinocéros 1968–1993
- Groupe socialiste des travailleurs 1973–1987
- Parti présidentiel 1974–1975
- Regroupement des militants syndicaux 1974–1981
- Alliance démocratique 1976–1977
- Parti crédit social uni 1979–1994
- Parti démocrate créditiste 1980
- Parti équitable 2012–2019
- Parti progressiste conservateur du Québec 1982–1991
- Parti pour la république du Canada (Québec) 1983–1998 (various names)
- Parti indépendantiste 1985–1990
- Parti du socialisme chrétien 1985
- Parti 51 1980s
- Parti citron 1989–1994
- Parti unité/Unity Party 1989–1990
- Parti économique du Québec 1993–1998
- Parti innovateur du Québec 1993–2003
- Parti de la souveraineté du Québec 1993–1996
- CANADA! 1994–1998
- Parti de la démocratie socialiste 1994–2002
- Parti de la loi naturelle du Québec 1994–2003
- Développement Québec 1994–1996
- Rassemblement pour l'alternative progressiste 2000–2002
- Union des forces progressistes 2002–2006
- Parti communiste du Québec 2006–2012
- Parti république du Québec 2007–2009
- Parti unité nationale (formerly Parti démocratie chrétienne du Québec) 2002–2018
- Parti indépendantiste 2007–2017
- Citoyens au pouvoir du Québec 2011–2021
- Changement Intégrité pour notre Québec 2016–2020
- Parti travailliste du Québec (founded 2015)

== Historical parties that never nominated candidates ==
- AffiliationQuebec (2008–2012)
- Union du centre (2008–2010)
- Option Canada (1991–1993) (never officially registered)

== Municipal parties ==
=== Quebec City ===
- Québec forte et fière
- Respect citoyens
- Leadership Québec
- Québec d'abord

== See also ==
- Chief Electoral Officer of Quebec
