= Mario Beaulieu (senator) =

Canadian politician (1930–1998)

The Honourable Mario Beaulieu

Senator for De la Durantaye, Quebec
- In office 1990–1994
- Preceded by: Jean Bazin
- Succeeded by: Lise Bacon

Member of the National Assembly of Quebec for Dorion
- In office 1969–1970
- Preceded by: François Aquin
- Succeeded by: Alfred Bossé

Personal details
- Born: February 1, 1930 Plantagenet, Ontario, Canada
- Died: October 12, 1998 (aged 68) Saint-Sauveur, Quebec, Canada
- Party: Progressive Conservative

Mario Beaulieu (February 1, 1930 – October 12, 1998) was a Canadian notary, politician and senator.

== Early life and career ==
Born in Plantagenet, Ontario, the son of Henri de Montpellier Beaulieu and Berthe Lalonde, he was educated in Montreal and became a notary in 1956.

He ran unsuccessfully for the National Assembly of Quebec as a Union Nationale candidate for the riding of Montréal-Laurier in 1962. In 1966, he was the President of the Union Nationale's electoral campaign and was the Chief of Staff to Premier Daniel Johnson and Deputy Minister of Executive Council from 1966 to 1968. In 1968, he was the General Director of the Union Nationale.

He was elected in a March 1969 by-election in the riding of Dorion and was appointed Minister of Immigration in Jean-Jacques Bertrand's cabinet, in which he served until 1970. From 1969 to 1970, he was the Minister of Finance. He was defeated in the 1970 election. He ran unsuccessfully in 1971 for the leadership of the Union Nationale, placing third, behind victor Gabriel Loubier and Marcel Masse. In 1971, he published a book, La victoire du Québec.

In 1984, he was Vice-President of the Progressive Conservative Party of Canada's Quebec campaign and Chairman of the electoral campaign in 1988.

In 1990, he was appointed to the Senate representing the senatorial division of De la Durantaye, Quebec as a Progressive Conservative, he resigned in June 1994.
