= List of premiers of Quebec by time in office =

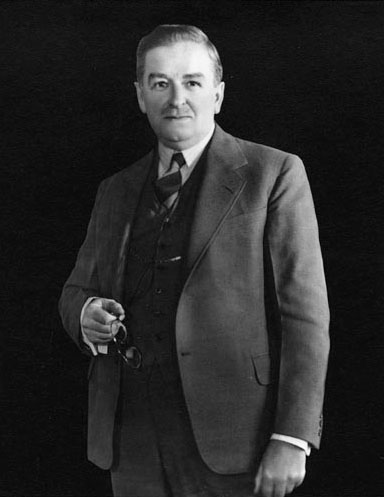
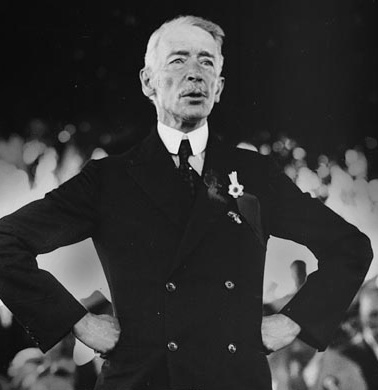
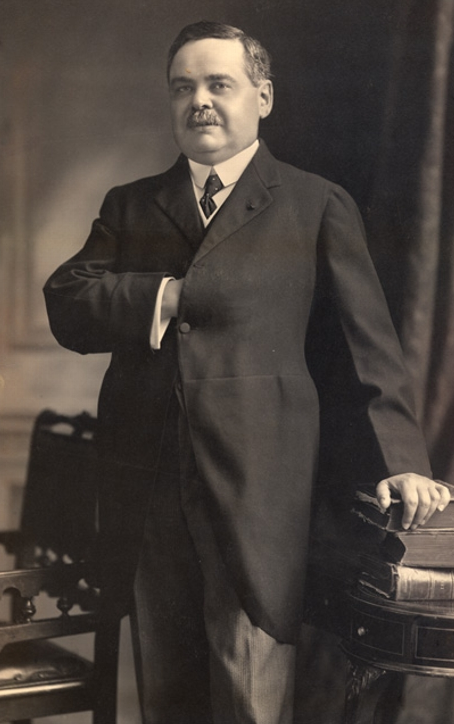
Quebec's three longest-serving premiers, left to right: Maurice Duplessis, 18 years, 82 days; Louis-Alexandre Taschereau, 15 years, 338 days; and Lomer Gouin, 15 years, 108 days.
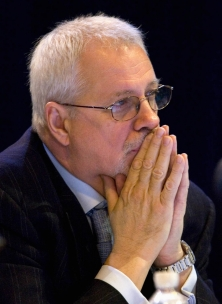
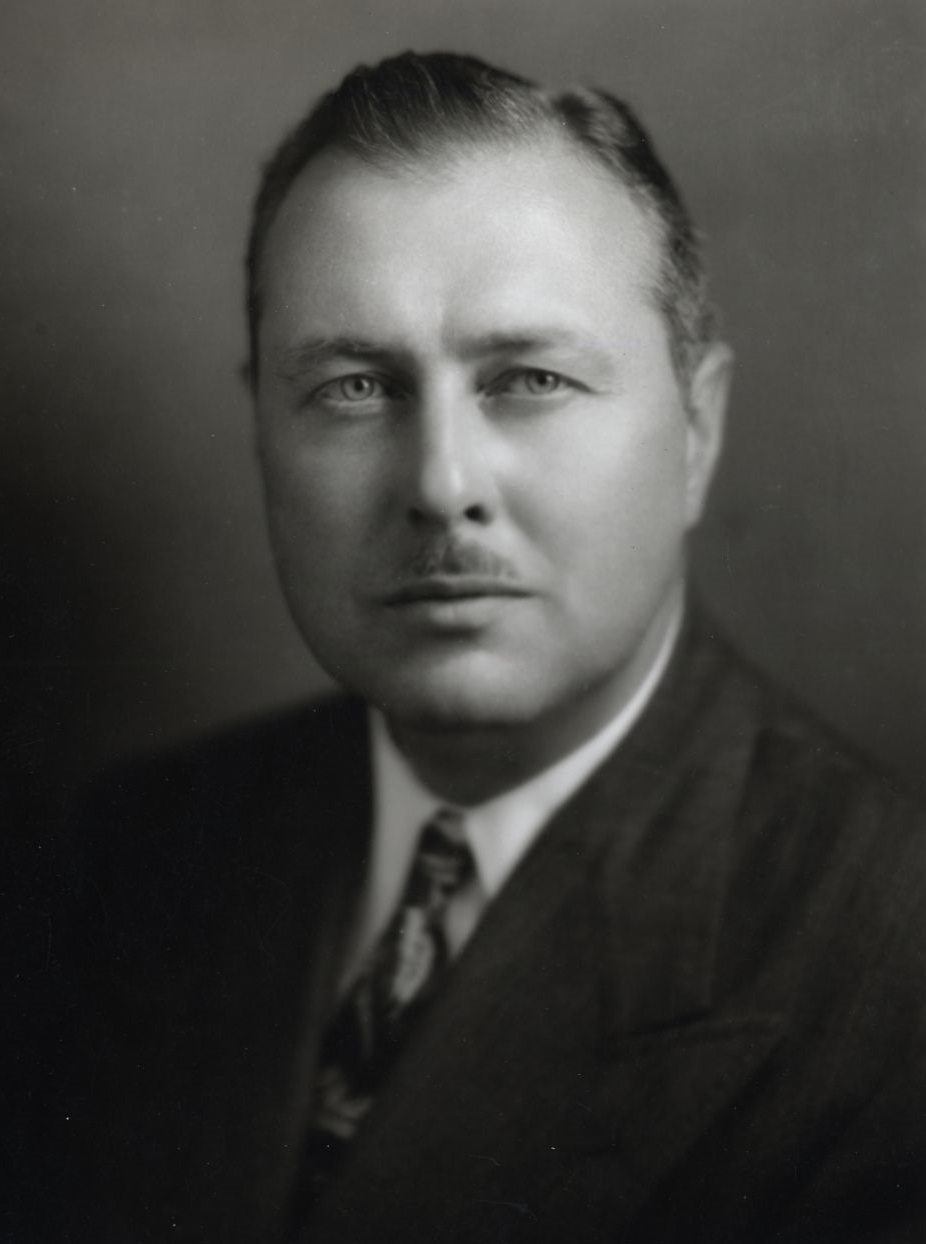
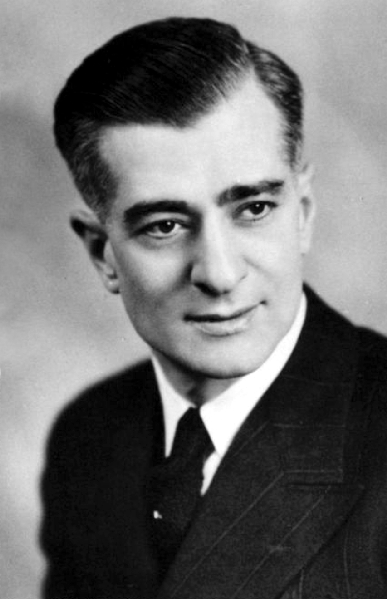
Quebec's three shortest-serving premiers, left to right: Pierre Marc Johnson, 70 days; Paul Sauvé, 113 days; and Antonio Barrette, 179 days.

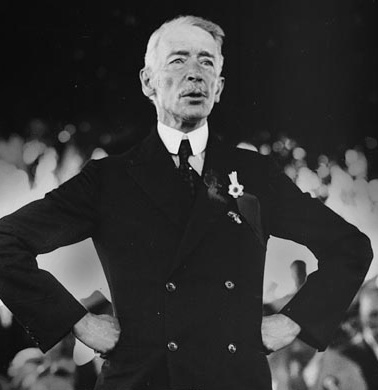
Louis-Alexandre Taschereau, the longest consecutively serving premier

The premier of Quebec is the head of government of Quebec. Since Canadian Confederation in 1867, there have been 32 premiers who have formed 37 Quebec ministries. The first premier, Pierre-Joseph-Olivier Chauveau, took office on July 15, 1867. The position does not have term limits. Instead, premiers can stay in office as long as their government has the confidence of a majority in the National Assembly of Quebec under the system of responsible government. Under this system, Maurice Duplessis was Quebec's longest-serving premier, holding office for a total of 18 years and 82 days over two non-consecutive terms.

The premier's term begins upon appointment by the lieutenant governor of Quebec, usually after winning a general election. One premier can also succeed another with no election—usually, but not necessarily, when they are successive leaders of the same party. A premier stays in office until they resign, die or are dismissed by the lieutenant governor. Four premiers have died in office (Felix-Gabriel Marchand, Duplessis, Paul Sauvé and Daniel Johnson Sr.) All others have resigned, either after losing an election, a parliamentary no confidence vote, or upon retirement. Theoretically, the lieutenant governor can dismiss a premier, but the last time that happened was when Honoré Mercier was dismissed by Auguste-Réal Angers in 1891.

The premier's term is not tied directly to the term of the provincial assembly, which the Constitution sets as a maximum of five years from the most recent general election. A premier takes office after winning an election, and resigns after losing an election, but the term in office does not match up directly to the term of the provincial assembly. An incoming premier will normally take office a few weeks after the election, and an outgoing premier will usually stay in office for a few weeks after losing the election. The transition period and the date for the transfer of office are negotiated by the incoming and the outgoing premiers.

A premier who holds office in consecutive legislatures is not re-appointed as premier for each legislature, but rather serves one continuous term. When a premier holds office in more than one parliament, it is customarily referred to as the premier's first government, second government, and so on.

A majority government normally lasts around four years, since general elections for the National Assembly are normally held every four years. Minority governments generally last for a shorter period. The shortest minority government, Pauline Marois's government, lasted just over a year and a half. A premier who is selected by the governing party to replace an outgoing premier may also serve a short term, if the new prime minister is defeated at the general election. Pierre Marc Johnson served the shortest term in Quebec history, only 70 days, in this way. He was selected by the Parti Québécois to replace René Lévesque, just before the general election of 1985, which Johnson and the PQ lost. Antonio Barrette, Daniel Johnson Jr., Edmund James Flynn, Jean-Jacques Bertrand and Bernard Landry each served short terms for similar reasons.

Of the other premiers who served short terms, Henri-Gustave Joly de Lotbinière and Pauline Marois were the only ones to have their time in office cut short by the collapse of their minority governments. Joly resigned following a vote of no confidence while Marois left office after her party's defeat in the following election.

In the late nineteenth century, three premiers succeeded to the office and did not call an election: Gédéon Ouimet resigned due to scandal, Joseph-Alfred Mousseau due to being named a puisne judge of the Superior Court and Louis-Olivier Taillon due to being appointed to Charles Tupper's federal government.

On six occasions since the twentieth century, a premier has retired and the governing party has selected a new party leader, who automatically became premier. Lomer Gouin (1905), Louis-Alexandre Taschereau (1920), Adélard Godbout (1936), Pierre Marc Johnson (1985), Daniel Johnson Jr. (1994) and Bernard Landry (2001) all succeeded to the office in this way. The new premier may continue to govern in the National Assembly called by the previous premier, but can also call an election within a few months. In those cases, the time before and after the election is counted as one government for the purposes of this table.

When a general election is called, the current premier stays in office during the election campaign. If the premier's party wins the election, the premier remains in office without being sworn in again; the premier's tenure of office is continuous. If defeated in the election, the outgoing premier stays in office during the transition period, until the new premier takes office. All of that time is included in the total "Time in office".

Excluding vacancies following the death of a premier, there has only been one gap between the term of an outgoing premier and the incoming premier: the gap, two days, was between Pierre-Joseph-Olivier Chauveau and Gédéon Ouimet in 1873: Chauveau resigned office on February 25, 1873, and Ouimet was appointed on February 27. The longest gap, eight days, was upon the death of Felix-Gabriel Marchand on September 25, 1900. Simon-Napoléon Parent did not take office until October 3, 1900. The last time there was a gap, of six days, occurred between Daniel Johnson Sr. and Jean-Jacques Bertrand: Johnson died on September 26, 1968, and Bertrand took office on October 2. There have been small gaps in office since then, with the new premier being appointed mere hours after the previous premier resigns.

== Table of premiers ==
Canadian custom is to count by the individuals who were premier, not by terms. Since Confederation, 32 premiers have been called upon by the lieutenant governor to form 37 Quebec ministries.

Quebec Liberal Party (12)
Conservative Party of Quebec (8)
Parti Québécois (7)
Union Nationale (5)
Coalition Avenir Québec (2)

| Rank | Premier | Incumbency | Dates in power | Mandates | Party |
|---|---|---|---|---|---|
| 1 | Maurice Duplessis (Note: Died in office) | 18 years, 82 days | 1936-8-26–1939-11-8; 1944-8-30–1959-9-7 | 5 | Union Nationale |
| 2 | Louis-Alexandre Taschereau | 15 years, 338 days | 1920-7-9–1936-6-11 | 4 | Liberal |
| 3 | Lomer Gouin | 15 years, 108 days | 1905-3-23–1920-7-9 | 4 | Liberal |
| 4 | Robert Bourassa | 14 years, 227 days | 1970-5-12–1976-11-25; 1985-12-12–1994-1-11 | 4 | Liberal |
| 5 | Jean Charest | 9 years, 143 days | 2003-4-29–2012-9-19 | 3 | Liberal |
| 6 | René Lévesque | 8 years, 312 days | 1976-11-25–1985-10-3 | 2 | Parti Québécois |
| 7 | François Legault | 7 years, 179 days | 2018-10-18–2026-04-15 | 2 | Coalition Avenir Québec |
| 8 | Jean Lesage | 5 years, 346 days | 1960-7-5–1966-6-16 | 2 | Liberal |
| 9 | Pierre-Joseph-Olivier Chauveau | 5 years, 225 days | 1867-07-15–1873-02-25 | 2 | Conservative |
| 10 | Lucien Bouchard | 5 years, 38 days | 1996-1-29–2001-3-8 | 1 | Parti Québécois |
| 11 | Adélard Godbout | 5 years, 7 days | 1936-6-11–1936-8-26; 1939-11-8–1944-8-30 | 1 | Liberal |
| 12 | Honoré Mercier | 4 years, 326 days | 1887-01-29–1891-12-21 | 1 | Liberal |
| 13 | Philippe Couillard | 4 years, 178 days | 2014-4-23–2018-10-18 | 1 | Liberal |
| 14 | Charles Boucher de Boucherville | 4 years, 163 days | 1874-09-22–1878-03-08; 1891-12-21–1892-12-16 | 2 | Conservative |
| 15 | Simon-Napoléon Parent | 4 years, 121 days | 1900-10-3–1905-3-23 | 2 | Liberal |
| 16 | Louis-Olivier Taillon | 3 years, 151 days | 1887-01-25–1887-01-29; 1892-12-16–1896-5-11 | 0 | Conservative |
| 17 | Félix-Gabriel Marchand | 3 years, 124 days | 1897-5-24–1900-9-25 | 1 | Liberal |
| 18 | John Jones Ross | 3 years, 2 days | 1884-01-23–1887-01-25 | 1 | Conservative |
| 19 | Joseph-Adolphe Chapleau | 2 years, 273 days | 1879-10-31–1882-07-31 | 1 | Conservative |
| 20 | Daniel Johnson Sr. | 2 years, 102 days | 1966-6-16–1968-9-26 | 1 | Union Nationale |
| 21 | Bernard Landry | 2 years, 52 days | 2001-3-8–2003-4-29 | 0 | Parti Québécois |
| 22 | Henri-Gustave Joly de Lotbinière | 1 year, 237 days | 1878-03-08–1879-10-31 | 1 | Liberal |
| 23 | Jean-Jacques Bertrand | 1 year, 222 days | 1968-10-2–1970-5-12 | 0 | Union Nationale |
| 24 | Pauline Marois | 1 year, 216 days | 2012-9-19–2014-4-23 | 1 | Parti Québécois |
| 25 | Gédéon Ouimet | 1 year, 207 days | 1873-02-27–1874-09-22 | 0 | Conservative |
| 26 | Joseph-Alfred Mousseau | 1 year, 176 days | 1882-07-31–1884-01-23 | 0 | Conservative |
| 27 | Jacques Parizeau | 1 year, 125 days | 1994-9-26–1996-1-29 | 1 | Parti Québécois |
| 28 | Edmund James Flynn | 1 year, 13 days | 1896-5-11–1897-5-24 | 0 | Conservative |
| 29 | Daniel Johnson Jr. | 0 years, 258 days | 1994-1-11–1994-9-26 | 0 | Liberal |
| 31 | Antonio Barrette | 0 years, 179 days | 1960-1-8–1960-7-5 | 0 | Union Nationale |
| 30 | Christine Fréchette | 0 years, 189 days | 2026-04-15–2026-10-21 | 0 | Coalition Avenir Québec |
| 32 | Paul Sauvé | 0 years, 113 days | 1959-9-11–1960-1-2 | 0 | Union Nationale |
| 33 | Pierre Marc Johnson | 0 years, 70 days | 1985-10-3–1985-12-12 | 0 | Parti Québécois |
| 34 | Paul St-Pierre Plamondon (Incumbent) | 29 days | 2026-10-21 | 1 | Parti Québécois |
