= Marcel Bédard =

Canadian politician (1940–2024)

Member of the National Assembly of Quebec for Montmorency
- In office 29 October 1973 – 15 November 1976
- Preceded by: Louis Vézina
- Succeeded by: Clément Richard

Mayor of Beauport
- In office 1970–1980
- Preceded by: Gaston Tremblay
- Succeeded by: Michel Rivard

Personal details
- Born: 15 April 1940 Quebec City, Quebec, Canada
- Died: 1 November 2024 (aged 84) Quebec City, Quebec, Canada
- Political party: Liberal
- Education: Université Laval
- Occupation: Engineer

Marcel Bédard (French pronunciation: [maʁsɛl bedaʁ]; 15 April 1940 – 1 November 2024) was a Canadian politician of the Quebec Liberal Party (PLQ).

Bédard served as mayor of Beauport from 1970 to 1980 and served in the National Assembly of Quebec from 1973 to 1976. Bédard died on 1 November 2024, at the age of 84.
