= Albert Gervais =

Canadian politician

Member of the Legislative Assembly of Quebec for Montmorency
- In office 1962–1966
- Preceded by: Yves Prévost
- Succeeded by: Gaston Tremblay

Personal details
- Born: August 7, 1922 Saint-Casimir, Quebec
- Died: March 19, 1989 (aged 66) Quebec City, Quebec
- Party: Union Nationale

Albert Gervais (August 7, 1922 – March 19, 1989) was a politician in Quebec, Canada and a Member of the Legislative Assembly of Quebec (MLA).

== Background ==
He was born in Saint-Casimir, Quebec in the Greater Quebec City Area on August 7, 1922.

== Political career ==
Gervais successfully ran as a Union Nationale candidate in the 1962 election in the provincial district of Montmorency. He did not run for re-election in the 1966 election.

== Death ==
He died on March 19, 1989.
