= Jacques Dumoulin =

Canadian politician

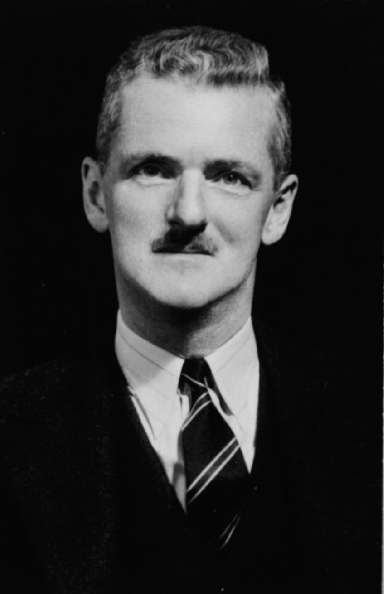

Member of the Legislative Assembly of Quebec for Montmorency
- In office 1939–1948
- Preceded by: Joseph-Félix Roy
- Succeeded by: Yves Prévost

Personal details
- Born: February 12, 1898 Quebec City, Quebec
- Died: February 20, 1988 (aged 90) Sarasota, Florida
- Party: Liberal
- Relations: Louis-Alexandre Taschereau (uncle); Robert Taschereau (cousin)
- Profession: Lawyer, judge

Jacques Dumoulin (February 12, 1898 – February 20, 1988) was a Canadian provincial politician and judge.

Born in Quebec City, Quebec, the son of Philippe-Benjamin Dumoulin and Marie-Louise Taschereau, Dumoulin was the member of the Legislative Assembly of Quebec for Montmorency from 1939 to 1948.

He was later a judge of the Exchequer Court of Canada from 1955 to 1971 and of the Appeal Division of the Federal Court of Canada from 1971 until 1972.
