= Gaston Tremblay =

Canadian politician (1924–1998)

Member of the National Assembly of Quebec for Montmorency
- In office 1966–1970
- Preceded by: Albert Gervais
- Succeeded by: Louis Vézina

Personal details
- Born: April 16, 1924 Quebec City, Quebec
- Died: July 11, 1998 (aged 74) Quebec City, Quebec
- Party: Union Nationale

Gaston Tremblay (French pronunciation: [ɡastɔ̃ tʁɑ̃blɛ]; April 16, 1924 – July 11, 1998) was a politician in Quebec, Canada and a Member of the Legislative Assembly of Quebec (MLA).

== Background ==
He was born in Quebec City on April 16, 1924 and became a physician.

== Mayor ==
Tremblay served as Mayor of Beauport, Quebec from 1961 to 1970.

== Member of the legislature ==
He unsuccessfully ran as a Union Nationale candidate in the 1962 election in the provincial district of Quebec County. Tremblay was elected to the Legislative Assembly of Quebec in the 1966 election and represented the district of Montmorency.

He crossed the floor on October 30, 1968 to sit as an Independent. He then joined the Parti nationaliste chrétien, and then in 1969, he joined the Ralliement créditiste and became its first sitting member in the provincial legislature.

Tremblay ran as a Ralliement créditiste candidate and was defeated in the 1970 and 1973 elections.

== Electoral history ==
In Montmorency (provincial electoral district)

1973 Quebec general election
Party	Candidate	Votes	%
Liberal	Marcel Bédard	15,248	51.89
Parti Québécois	Clément Richard	9,275	31.56
Parti créditiste	Gaston Tremblay	3,863	13.15
Union Nationale	Pierre Linteau	999	3.40
Total valid votes		29,385	97.63
Total rejected ballots		714	2.37
Turnout		30,099	84.52
Electors on the lists		35,610	–

1970 Quebec general election
Party	Candidate	Votes	%
Liberal	Louis Vézina	9,714	32.65
Ralliement créditiste	Gaston Tremblay	9,674	32.51
Union Nationale	J.-Eugène Houde	6,337	21.30
Parti Québécois	Gérard Langlois	3,729	12.53
Independent	Jean-Guy Bolduc	300	1.01
Total valid votes		29,753	97.84
Total rejected ballots		657	2.16
Turnout		30,410	87.35
Electors on the lists		34,812	–

1966 Quebec general election
Party	Candidate	Votes	%
Union Nationale	Gaston Tremblay	14,151	54.25
Liberal	Réal Therrien	9,627	36.90
RIN	Guy Pouliot	1,423	5.46
Ralliement national	Maurice Talbot	885	3.39
Total valid votes		26,086	98.01
Total rejected ballots		529	1.99
Turnout		26,615	82.94
Electors on the lists		32,091	–

== See also ==
- History of Quebec
