= Robert Burns (Quebec politician) =

Canadian politician

Robert Burns (September 5, 1936 – May 15, 2014) was a Canadian politician, attorney and union activist from Quebec, Canada.

== Background ==
He was born on September 5, 1936, in Montreal to working-class family with English speaking father of Irish Quebecer descent and a French-Canadian mother. His father delivered bread for a living and died when Robert was two. Burns trained as a labour lawyer at the University of Montreal on a scholarship and became a legal advisor to the Confédération des syndicats nationaux (CSN) trade union. Politically, he was active in the Co-operative Commonwealth Federation, the predecessor of the New Democratic Party.

Initially a federalist, Burns became a nationalist as a result of his experiences representing francophone workers against English bosses and was persuaded to stand as a Parti Québécois candidate in 1970.

== Member of the legislature ==
Burns won a seat to the National Assembly of Quebec in 1970 in the district of Maisonneuve having defeated former Rassemblement pour l'indépendance nationale leader Marcel Chaput for the Parti Québécois's nomination. He was one of seven Péquistes to win a seat in the National Assembly, the first contested by the new party.

He was re-elected in 1973 and 1976. Burns was the informal leader of the left-wing faction of the PQ and often clashed with the more moderate PQ leader René Lévesque, particularly over labour disputes, and criticised Levesque's position during the La Presse strike in 1971 with such vigour that when he left a meeting with Levesque, he slammed the door and shattered its glass pane.

He was passed over by Lévesque after the 1973 election, when Jacques-Yvan Morin was appointed Leader of the Opposition instead of Burns, after Lévesque failed to win a seat in the election. Burns served as his party's House Leader from 1970 until 1978 when he was replaced by Claude Charron after suffering a heart attack.

His relationship with his party was at times uneasy. In 1979, he told reporters “I am a socialist and the Parti Québécois is not always socialist."

== Cabinet Member ==
In 1977, Burns was appointed to Premier René Lévesque's Cabinet and became a key architect of the government's drive for Quebec independence. He served as Minister responsible for Electoral Reform and introduced the province's law banning corporate and union donations to political parties and limiting donations to $100 per person and also wrote Quebec's referendum law that funded both sides equally and required each side to have umbrella committees that included all proponents. Burns was also instrumental in Quebec's introduction of anti-scab legislation that banned companies from hiring strikebreakers during strikes. Burns also issued a white paper favouring proportional representation but the idea was not popular with his colleagues.

His health weakened, Burns resigned his seat and retired from politics in 1979 and was appointed a labour court judge in 1980, Burns again clashed with Lévesque, predicting the government's defeat in the 1980 sovereignty referendum and in the subsequent election.

== Later years and death ==
Burns remained on the Labour Court for two decades, retiring in 2001.

During the 2012 Quebec student protests he urged Premier Jean Charest to negotiate with students demanding a tuition freeze. He also commented on the Charbonneau Commission inquiry into corruption saying he was "disgusted" by allegations that construction and engineering companies flouted his electoral financing law by making illegal donations to political parties.

Burns died on May 15, 2014, aged 77.

== Footnotes ==
National Assembly of Quebec
Preceded by André Léveillé (Union Nationale)	MNA for Maisonneuve; 1970–1979	Succeeded by Georges Lalande (Liberal)
