= Jean-François Simard =

Canadian politician (born 1966)

Member of the National Assembly of Quebec for Montmorency
- In office October 1, 2018 – October 5, 2026
- Preceded by: Raymond Bernier
- Succeeded by: Marie-Josée Hélie
- In office November 30, 1998 – April 14, 2003
- Preceded by: Jean Filion
- Succeeded by: Raymond Bernier

Quebec Minister of Employment
- In office April 21, 2026 – October 21, 2026
- Premier: Christine Fréchette
- Preceded by: Pascale Déry
- Succeeded by: Mathieu Lebrun

Personal details
- Born: December 10, 1966 (age 59)
- Party: Coalition Avenir Québec
- Other political affiliations: Parti Québécois (former) Liberal Party of Canada (former) Bloc Québécois

Jean-François Simard (born December 10, 1966) is a Canadian politician and teacher. He was a member of the National Assembly of Quebec (MNA) for the riding of Montmorency from 1998 to 2003, representing the Parti Québécois. He served as a delegate minister in the Cabinet of Quebec Premier Bernard Landry for over a year. He returned to the National Assembly as a Coalition Avenir Québec (CAQ) MNA in 2018 until 2026. He served as Minister of Natural Resources and Forests from September 2025 to April 2026, before becoming Minister of Employment on April 21, 2026.

== Biography ==
Simard holds several degrees, including a doctorate in sociology from the Université Laval, a master's degree in regional development from the Université du Québec à Rimouski, a bachelor's degree in communications and sociophysiology from the Université du Québec à Montréal, and a diploma in European federalism in Italy.

In the late 1980s, Simard was the vice-president of the Canadian liberal youth-wing but resigned following the failure of the Meech Lake Accord in 1990. He then joined the Bloc Québécois and later the Parti Québécois, where he was a political adviser for former Quebec Premier Jacques Parizeau during the 1995 Quebec referendum campaign. In the 1998 election, he was elected as MNA for Montmorency, serving until 2001 as the Parliamentary Assistant to the State Minister of Education and Youth, François Legault. In 2002 until the end of the PQ mandate, he was named the Delegate Minister for Environment and Water. When the PQ lost the 2003 elections to the Quebec Liberal Party and Jean Charest, Simard was defeated by Liberal Candidate Raymond Bernier. He would return to Cabinet in the CAQ government.

After the 2003 elections, Simard worked as a lecturer at Université Laval in the faculty of industrial relations. Since 2004, he has been a teacher at the faculty of social sciences and social work at the Université du Québec en Outaouais, where he also serves as an administration staff member since 2006.

== Electoral record ==
2026 Quebec general election: Montmorenc
** Preliminary results — Not yet official **
Party	Candidate	Votes	%	±%
Conservative	Marie-Josée Hélie	19,482	43.81	+17.75
Parti Québécois	Nathalie Gagnon	9,951	22.38	+11.10
Coalition Avenir Québec	Jean-François Simard	5,689	12.79	−32.39
Liberal	René-Paul Coly	5,145	11.57	+6.92
Québec solidaire	Annie-Pierre Bélanger	3,853	8.67	−3.38
Parti nul	Renaud Blais	222	0.50	
Parti accès propriété et équité	Pierre Gosselin	90	0.20	
Marxist–Leninist	Jean Bédard	34	0.08	
Total valid votes		44,466	100.00	
Total rejected ballots				
Turnout			77.22	
Electors on the lists				
Conservative gain from Coalition Avenir Québec		Swing		+17.75
Source: Élections Québec

2022 Quebec general election: Montmorency
Party	Candidate	Votes	%	±%
Coalition Avenir Québec	Jean-François Simard	19,124	45.18	-5.69
Conservative	Mylene Bouchard	11,031	26.06	+22.27
Québec solidaire	Annie-Pierre Bélanger	5,100	12.05	-1.09
Parti Québécois	Cynthia Therrien	4,773	11.28	+0.67
Liberal	Mustapha Berri	1,969	4.65	-13.95
Green	Nicholas Lescarbeau	274	0.65	-0.75
Marxist–Leninist	Jean Bédard	55	0.13	-0.04
Total valid votes		42,326	98.85	
Total rejected ballots		494	1.15	
Turnout		42,820	73.94	
Electors on the lists		57,913		

2018 Quebec general election: Montmorency
Party	Candidate	Votes	%	±%
Coalition Avenir Québec	Jean-François Simard	20,233	50.87	+17.04
Liberal	Marie France Trudel	7,397	18.6	-21.82
Québec solidaire	Marie-Christine Lamontagne	5,225	13.14	+8.46
Parti Québécois	Alexandre Huot	4,221	10.61	-6.5
Conservative	Daniel Beaulieu	1,507	3.79	+1.39
Independent	Jean-François Simard	561	1.41	
Green	Nicholas Lescarbeau	558	1.4	+0.44
Marxist–Leninist	Jean Bédard	69	0.17	
Total valid votes		39,771	98.02	
Total rejected ballots		802	1.98	
Turnout		40,573	70.96	
Eligible voters		57,179		
Coalition Avenir Québec gain from Liberal		Swing		+19.43
Source(s) "Rapport des résultats officiels du scrutin". Élections Québec.

1998 Quebec general election: Montmorency
Party	Candidate	Votes	%	±%
Parti Québécois	Jean-François Simard	19,946	45.16	
Liberal	Jacques Langlois	14,818	33.55	
Action démocratique	Yves Leclerc	7,154	16.20	
Independent	Jean Filion	1,774	4.02	
Socialist Democracy	Linda Fick	267	0.60	
Marxist–Leninist	Jean Bédard	204	0.46	
Total valid votes		44,163	100.00	
Rejected and declined votes		481		
Turnout		44,644	80.73	
Electors on the lists		55,300		
Source: Official Results, Government of Quebec
