= Union Nationale leadership elections =

This page lists the results of leadership elections held by the Union Nationale. Before 1961 leaders were chosen by the caucus.

== Leadership 1936-1961 ==
The Union Nationale (UN) was formed at a caucus of Conservative Party of Quebec and Action libérale nationale MLAs on June 20, 1936. Conservative leader Maurice Duplessis was chosen leader of this new party.

Duplessis led the party until his death on September 7, 1959. On September 10 the caucus elected Paul Sauvé as leader and became premier the following day. Sauve in turn died on January 2, 1960. Antonio Barrette was elected by the caucus on January 7 as leader and became premier the next day.

Following the UN's defeat in the 1960 general election Barette resigned as UN leader on September 15, 1960. The caucus elected Yves Prévost as interim leader the following day. He resigned on January 11, 1961, and was succeeded as interim leader by Antonio Talbot.

== 1961 leadership convention ==
(Held September 23, 1961)

- Daniel Johnson, Sr. 1,006
- Jean-Jacques Bertrand 912
- Armand Nadeau 24
- Raymond Maher 2

Yves Gabias and Maurice S. Hebert withdrew before balloting.

Johnson died on September 26, 1968. Jean-Jacques Bertrand was chosen interim leader and premier on October 2.

== 1969 leadership convention ==
(Held June 21, 1969)

- Jean-Jacques Bertrand 1,327
- Jean-Guy Cardinal 938
- André Léveillé 22

== 1971 leadership convention ==
(Held June 19, 1971)

First ballot:

- Gabriel Loubier 529
- Marcel Masse 482
- Mario Beaulieu 178
- Pierre Sévigny 26
- André Léveillé 0

Second ballot (Sevigny and Leveille eliminated):

- Gabriel Loubier 568
- Marcel Masse 544
- Mario Beaulieu 99

Third ballot (Beaulieu eliminated):

- Gabriel Loubier 607
- Marcel Masse 584

Loubier resigned on March 30, 1974. Maurice Bellemare was chosen interim leader by the executive.

== 1976 leadership convention ==
(Held May 22, 1976)

- Rodrigue Biron 764
- Jacques Tétreault 270
- Gerard Nepveu 126
- Jean-Guy Leboeuf 106
- William Shaw 60

Biron resigned on March 3, 1980, and crossed the floor to join the Parti Québécois a few months later. Michel Le Moignan was chosen interim leader.

== 1981 leadership convention ==
(Held January 9, 1981)

- Roch La Salle acclaimed

== 1982 leadership convention ==
(Held October 24, 1982)

- Jean-Marc Béliveau acclaimed

== See also ==
- leadership convention
- Union Nationale (Quebec)
