= Parti nationaliste chrétien =

Defunct Québécois political party

Parti Nationaliste Chrétien
- Founded: 1967; 58 years ago
- Ideology: Conservatism; Theocracy; Quebec nationalism Quebec separatism Clerico-nationalism
- Political position: Right-wing to far-right
- Seats in the National Assembly: 1 (1968–1969)

The Parti Nationaliste Chrétien (French pronunciation: [paʁti nɑsjɔnalist kʁetjɛ̃]; PNC; English: Christian Nationalist Party) is a defunct nationalist, separatist, theocratic and conservative political party in Quebec created in 1967 by Léo Tremblay. The support of the party was a part of the Quebec clergy and the Quebec rural population. The party received some attention when Gaston Tremblay, a Union Nationale MNA from Montmorency, decided to defect to the PNC. However, Gaston Tremblay changed party affiliation again in 1969, and joined the Ralliement créditiste du Québec. The PNC did not support any candidate in the 1970 provincial election and did not show any signs of activity thereafter.

== Origins ==
The PNC was founded in 1967 as an extension of the Front de défense des écoles confessionnelles (FDÉC) and the Phalange, a far right-wing secret society. In 1967, the FDÉC organized a campaign against Part V of the Parent Report and the creation of Polyvalentes and CÉGEPs. As part of this campaign, Léo Tremblay made a tour of Quebec, where he made speeches in rural areas to encourage the people to resist reforms in education. He also started a petition against these reforms, which received 100,000 signatures from "worried parents".

Following the adoption of the reforms, Tremblay concluded that the Union nationale government had betrayed their constituents. According to Tremblay's analysis, Daniel Johnson had usurped power by applying policies so similar to those of the previous government while having been elected by his opposition to these same policies during the election campaign and a desire of Quebecers to return to the policy of Maurice Duplessis. Because the National Union had changed so much from their old self, Léo Tremblay decided to found a new political party, the Parti Nationaliste Chrétien.

== Ideology ==
The ideology of the Parti Nationaliste Chrétien can be summarized as follows: Order and theocracy, then independence.

The PNC published an electoral program describing its ideology and its political positions on February 7, 1969. This manifesto mostly restates the ideas described in Leo Tremblay's first book published a few years prior. This program states that a PNc government would:

- Confessionalize of schools and hospitals,
- Fire the high-ranked technocratic public servant from the Quebec government,
- Respect the principle of God-Family-Nation; "To unite Christ and the Nation", and
- Acquire political independence for Quebec

The main point of the PNC program is that schools and hospitals in Quebec should be run by the Quebec clergy again. At that time, they had only been secularized at the beginning of that decade. The PNC saw this as a way to bring order back in Quebec society, which they considered to be controlled by "atheist, socialist and secularist technocrats". The party also criticizes the Quebec clergy for having "abandoned its responsibilities", and favored the deconfessionalisation. After this reform, the PNC planned to proceed to the independence of Quebec, as leader Léo Tremblay was deeply nationalist.

The PNC praises Maurice Duplessis, and considers that the death of Duplessis was a disaster for the Union Nationale and for Quebec. The PNC denounces "the old parties", the Quebec Liberal Party and the Union Nationale, for conducting a policy that "destroyed Quebecois traditions" and that "does not care about the people nor parliament." The PNC also denounces the Quiet Revolution by asserting that it made the people slaves of its own servants, the technocrats. The party says that these technocrats are removing the hierarchies and the real values of Quebecers and that its reform pushed the youth to despair, drugs and suicide. Satanic propaganda orchestrated by the state television and foreign publications push the Quebec people to genocide. The NCP also laments the decline of the birth rate in Quebec, and predicts that this will eventually make the Quebecers people extinct. Therefore, immediate steps must be taken to restore order, peace and security in Quebec, and reconcile God with his people.

Léo Tremblay's first book contained long sections on the superiority of the French-Canadian "race" and the evils of the Jewish community in Quebec. These ideas are not included in the 1969 manifesto, where the concept of "race" is associated with the concept of the "Fatherland".

== Bibliography ==
Parti nationaliste chrétien, le Parti nationaliste chrétien, Québec, 1969, 63 p.

== See also ==
- List of political parties in Quebec
