= Louis-Alexandre Taschereau =

Premier of Quebec from 1920 to 1936

The Honourable Louis-Alexandre Taschereau
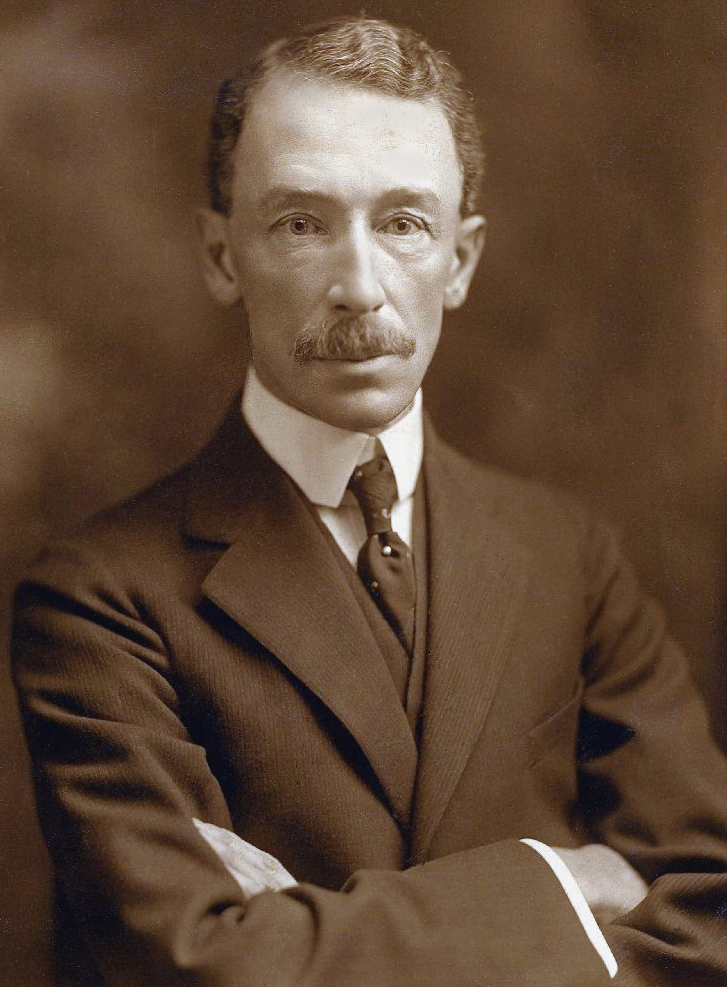
- Taschereau in 1930

14th Premier of Quebec
- In office July 8, 1920 – June 11, 1936
- Monarchs: George V Edward VIII
- Lieutenant Governor: Charles Fitzpatrick; Louis-Philippe Brodeur; Narcisse Pérodeau; Lomer Gouin; Henry George Carroll; Esioff-Léon Patenaude
- Preceded by: Lomer Gouin
- Succeeded by: Adélard Godbout

MNA for Montmorency
- In office December 7, 1900 – August 17, 1936
- Preceded by: Édouard Bouffard
- Succeeded by: Joseph-Félix Roy

Personal details
- Born: March 5, 1867 Quebec City, Quebec
- Died: July 6, 1952 (aged 85) Quebec City, Quebec
- Party: Liberal
- Spouse: Marie-Emma-Adine Dionne (m. 1891)
- Profession: Lawyer

Louis-Alexandre Taschereau (French pronunciation: [taʃʁo]; March 5, 1867 – July 6, 1952) was the 14th premier of Quebec from 1920 to 1936. A member of the Parti libéral du Québec, Taschereau's near 16-year tenure remains the longest uninterrupted term of office among Quebec premiers.

== Early life ==
Taschereau was born in Quebec City, Quebec, the son of Jean-Thomas Taschereau, lawyer and judge at the Supreme Court, and Marie-Louise-Joséphine Caron.

He received a law degree from Université Laval and was admitted to the Barreau du Quebec on July 9, 1889. After entering political life, he served as chief lieutenant in the Liberal government of Sir Lomer Gouin. He practised his profession in the law firm of Charles Fitzpatrick and Simon-Napoléon Parent. He was also journalist at the Action Libérale and president and vice-president of the Banque d'Economie de Québec.

A member of the Legislative Assembly from 1900 onwards, he served as Premier Lomer Gouin's Minister of Public Works from 1907 to 1919.

== Premier of Quebec ==
Elected Premier in 1920, at a time when the North American economy began experiencing difficulties that ultimately led to the Great Depression, he opposed U.S. President Franklin D. Roosevelt's New Deal social democratic policies, saying he could not tell if it was fascism or communism. Instead, he vigorously encouraged the development by private enterprise of the massive forests and the mineral resources of what had been the Ungava Region and Nunavik that the Parliament of Canada had added to the Province of Quebec.

A pioneer in advocating the exploitation of the huge hydraulic potential the waterways of the new Quebec, Taschereau understood the limited capital available in a sparsely populated Canada, and actively tried to bring in American investment to develop Quebec's industrial potential and try to stop mass emigration south of the border.

His policies challenged the traditional agrarian society that the dominance and influence of the Roman Catholic Church had been able to maintain in Quebec longer than elsewhere in North America. The Liberals of Taschereau were primarily opposed by ultramontane nationalists such as Henri Bourassa, editor of Le Devoir, and Roman Catholic priest Lionel Groulx, editor of L'action canadienne-française.

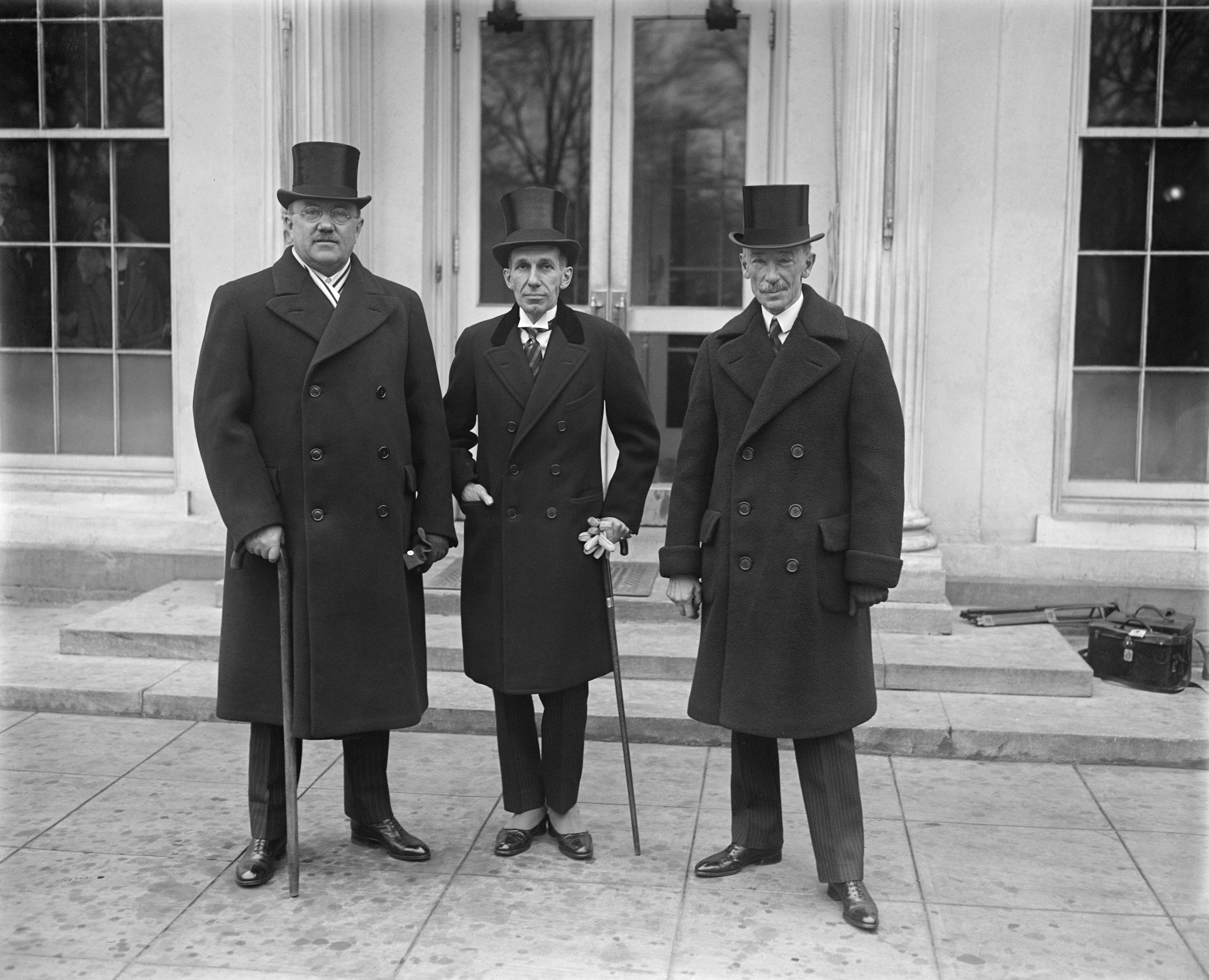
Louis-Alexandre Taschereau with Canadian Ambassador to the United States Vincent Massey and Justice Minister Ernest Lapointe at the White House in 1927.

Taschereau introduced a measure in 1930 to create a Jewish board that would have provided for Jewish participation on the highest decision-making educational body in Quebec, the Quebec Council of Public Instruction. Some newspapers saw the move by Taschereau to revamp the confessional school system as an example of an undermining of Christianity. As a result of the opposition, the Jewish leadership did not push the issue when Taschereau was forced to repeal the Act and submit a compromise which he had the leaders of the Roman Catholic Church examine and approve beforehand. In the resulting bill, Jews were sent back into the Protestant system, and the Jewish board had no power beyond the right to negotiate a deal with the Protestant School board.

Another policy of Taschereau involved the alcohol trade. The Alcohol Beverages Act established the Quebec Liquor Commission (predecessor to the modern Société des alcools du Québec), which provided the government of Quebec with a monopoly on the sale of liquor and wine during the era of Prohibition in the United States.

Taschereau created the Beaux-Arts schools in Quebec City and Montreal and subsidized scientific and literary works. He was awarded France's Legion of Honour, the Order of Leopold (Belgium), and made a Commander of the Order of the Crown of Belgium.

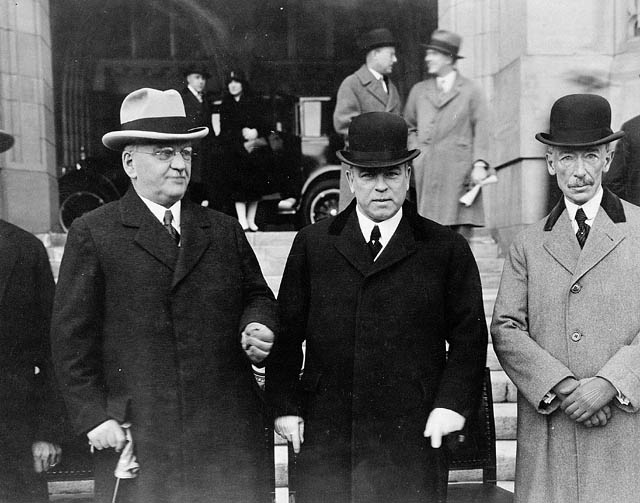
Taschereau (right) with Prime Minister William Lyon Mackenzie King (centre) and Premier of Ontario, Howard Ferguson (left), during the Dominion-Provincial conference on November 23, 1927

In the later years of his premiership, discontent inside the Liberal Party became evident. The more "radical" left wing of the party left the Liberals and formed a new party, the Action libérale nationale. Paul Gouin, the son of Lomer Gouin and grandson of Honoré Mercier, joined this new party. Later, the Action Libérale Nationale merged with the Conservative Party of Quebec to form the Union Nationale party under the leadership of Maurice Duplessis, who had become famous by exposing the Taschereau cabinet's misdeeds before the Accounts Committee of the Legislative Assembly.

After his brother Antoine admitted to the Accounts Committee that he had deposited the interest on funds belonging to the Legislative Assembly into his personal bank account, Premier Taschereau resigned in favour of fellow Liberal Adélard Godbout, who was sworn in as premier in June 1936. Two months later Godbout lost the election to the Union Nationale, and 40 years of Liberal rule came to an end.

The premier served on the boards of a number of major companies, including: Barclays Bank (Canada) Ltd., Caisse d'économie, Molson Bank, Canadian Investments Funds, Bank of Montreal, Royal Trust Company, Sun Life Assurance, North American Life Assurance Company, Metropolitan Life Assurance Co., Liverpool & London & Globe Insurance Co., Pioneer Insurance Co., Globe Indemnity Co. and the Manitoba Liverpool Insurance Co.

Taschereau won the 1923 election, 1927 election, 1931 election and 1935 election and resigned in 1936.

== Death ==
After his death in Quebec City in 1952, Taschereau was interred in the Cimetière Notre-Dame-de-Belmont in Sainte-Foy, Quebec.

== See also ==
- Politics of Quebec
- List of Quebec general elections
- Timeline of Quebec history

Political offices
Preceded by William Alexander Weir (Liberal)	Minister of Public Works and Labour; 1907–1919	Succeeded by Antonin Galipeault (Liberal)
Preceded by Lomer Gouin (Liberal)	Attorney General; 1919–1936	Succeeded by Joseph-Édouard Perrault (Liberal)
