= Yves Séguin =

Canadian politician

MNA for Montmorency
- In office 1985–1990
- Preceded by: Clément Richard
- Succeeded by: Jean Filion

MNA for Outremont
- In office 2003–2005
- Preceded by: Gérald Tremblay
- Succeeded by: Raymond Bachand

Minister of Finance
- In office 2003–2005
- Preceded by: Pauline Marois
- Succeeded by: Michel Audet

Personal details
- Born: March 20, 1951 (age 75) Val-d'Or, Quebec, Canada
- Party: Liberal

Yves Séguin (French pronunciation: [iv seɡɛ̃]; born March 30, 1951) is a former Canadian politician in Quebec.

He was first elected as the Quebec Liberal Party (QLP) member for Montmorency in 1985. He was the parliamentary assistant to the Minister of Revenue from 1985 to 1987. He was then made the Minister of Revenue himself in 1987. He was also made the Minister of Labour in 1988. He resigned from both positions in 1990.

After serving in various private capacities, he re-entered public life, winning a seat in Outremont in 2003. He was appointed Minister of Finance by Jean Charest. He served in this position until his resignation in 2005. He resigned as a Member of National Assembly soon after.

In 2005, he presided the Commission on the Fiscal Imbalance for the Québec government, which held public hearings on the matter.

== Electoral record ==
1985 Quebec general election: Montmorency
Party	Candidate	Votes	%	±%
Liberal	Yves Séguin	21,115	59.37	
Parti Québécois	Jean Filion	11,173	31.42	
Progressive Conservative	Yvon Careau	1,351	3.80	
New Democratic	Michael Haberman	1,200	3.37	
Independent	José Breton	513	1.44	
Independent	Martin Trudel	112	0.31	
Christian Socialist	Ronald Ouellet	101	0.28	
Total valid votes		35,565	100.00	
Rejected and declined votes		567		
Turnout		36,132	77.75	
Electors on the lists		46,472		

1989 Quebec general election: Montmorency
Party	Candidate	Votes	%	±%
Liberal	Yves Séguin	20,653	59.95	
Parti Québécois	Louis Bonenfant	11,280	32.74	
New Democratic	Germaine Poirier	1,726	5.01	
Independent	Martin Trudel	524	1.52	
Marxist–Leninist	Jean Bédard	266	0.77	
Total valid votes		34,449	100.00	
Rejected and declined votes		802		
Turnout		35,251	75.58	
Electors on the lists		46,641		
