= André Léveillé =

Canadian politician (1933–2017)

Member of the National Assembly of Quebec for Maisonneuve
- In office 1966–1970
- Preceded by: Marcel Dupré
- Succeeded by: Robert Burns

Personal details
- Born: August 11, 1933 Montreal, Quebec
- Died: January 18, 2017 (aged 83)
- Party: Union Nationale

André Léveillé (August 11, 1933 – January 18, 2017) was a Canadian politician in Quebec.

== Background ==
He was born on August 11, 1933, in Montreal and was an accountant by profession.

== Member of the legislature ==
Léveillé won a seat to the Legislative Assembly of Quebec in 1966 in the district of Maisonneuve and was a member of the Union Nationale. He served as the government's Deputy Whip from 1966 to 1968. Léveillé lost his re-election in 1970 and was succeeded by Parti Québécois (PQ) candidate Robert Burns.

== Party Leader ==
He was defeated at the Union Nationale leadership conventions of 1969, when he placed last with 22 votes, and in 1971, when he received no votes on the first ballot.

Out of politics, Léveillé worked as a realtor and served as a commissioner of oaths, accepted several other public appointments, and operated a small publishing company in the 1970s and 1980s.

On October 11, 1985, he re-entered political life by founding the Parti du progrès (Progress Party) but then resigned from the party two weeks later when he was appointed interim leader of the Union Nationale, leading the party into the December 2, 1985, provincial election in which the party received 0.23% of the vote. Léveillé finished a distant fourth in his own district against Louise Harel with 1.3% of the vote. The Union Nationale ran only 19 candidates, none of whom were elected. Léveillé resigned as party leader on December 7, 1985. The Union Nationale would not contest another general election prior to being deregistered by the Chief Electoral Officer of Quebec in 1989.
