= Marie-Josée Hélie =

Canadian politician

Marie-Josée Hélie MNA
- Marie-Josée Hélie in 2022

Member of the National Assembly of Quebec for Montmorency
- Incumbent
- Assumed office 5 October 2026
- Preceded by: Jean-François Simard

Personal details
- Party: Conservative Party of Quebec
- Occupation: Entrepreneur, food autonomy specialist

Marie-Josée Hélie is a Canadian entrepreneur and politician. She was elected to the National Assembly of Quebec as the Member of the National Assembly (MNA) for Montmorency in the 2026 Quebec general election, representing the Conservative Party of Quebec (PCQ). She is the PCQ spokesperson for identity and culture.

== Early life and career ==
Hélie is originally from Berthierville, Quebec, in the Lanaudière region. She comes from a business family; the family company Simon Hélie Ltée is active in lime transport and spreading for agriculture. She has training in agriculture and forestry.

Around 2009 she moved with her family to Anticosti Island, at Port-Menier, where she established a food- and energy-self-sufficient farm (greenhouses, livestock, biomass and solar energy) and sold surplus produce to other residents of the island. She lived there for about fifteen years before returning to the Quebec City area in August 2021.

== Political career ==
=== 2022 provincial election ===
In 2022 Hélie founded and chaired the Conservative association in Taschereau, and was the PCQ candidate there in the 2022 Quebec general election. She received about 8.7% of the vote (3,012 votes); Québec solidaire candidate Étienne Grandmont was elected.

After the election she remained active in the PCQ, including as environment spokesperson and later as spokesperson for identity and culture.

=== Federal nomination bid ===
In 2024, encouraged by PCQ leader Éric Duhaime, she sought the Conservative Party of Canada nomination in Beauport—Côte-de-Beaupré—Île d'Orléans—Charlevoix (later the redistributed Montmorency—Charlevoix riding). The federal party later rejected her candidacy after media reports of inaccuracies in her curriculum vitae, including a stated job at Kalpa Energy. Duhaime continued to support her as a provincial candidate.

=== 2026 provincial election ===
Running for the PCQ in Montmorency in the 2026 Quebec general election on 5 October 2026, Hélie was elected MNA. According to Le Soleil, she received 43.81% of the vote, ahead of Nathalie Gagnon of the Parti Québécois (22.38%) and incumbent Coalition Avenir Québec MNA Jean-François Simard (12.79%). Métro reported preliminary figures of 43.63% for the PCQ, 12.45% for the PQ and 12.80% for the CAQ.

== Electoral record ==
2026 Quebec general election: Montmorenc
** Preliminary results — Not yet official **
Party	Candidate	Votes	%	±%
Conservative	Marie-Josée Hélie	19,482	43.81	+17.75
Parti Québécois	Nathalie Gagnon	9,951	22.38	+11.10
Coalition Avenir Québec	Jean-François Simard	5,689	12.79	−32.39
Liberal	René-Paul Coly	5,145	11.57	+6.92
Québec solidaire	Annie-Pierre Bélanger	3,853	8.67	−3.38
Parti nul	Renaud Blais	222	0.50	
Parti accès propriété et équité	Pierre Gosselin	90	0.20	
Marxist–Leninist	Jean Bédard	34	0.08	
Total valid votes		44,466	100.00	
Total rejected ballots				
Turnout			77.22	
Electors on the lists				
Conservative gain from Coalition Avenir Québec		Swing		+17.75
Source: Élections Québec

=== Montmorency, 2026 ===
According to Le Soleil (reported 6 October 2026):

- Conservative Party of Quebec – Marie-Josée Hélie: 43.81%
- Parti Québécois – Nathalie Gagnon: 22.38%
- Coalition Avenir Québec – Jean-François Simard: 12.79%

=== Taschereau, 2022 ===
- Conservative Party of Quebec – Marie-Josée Hélie: 3,012 votes (8.7%)
- Seat won by Étienne Grandmont (Québec solidaire)
