= Montmorency (provincial electoral district) =

Provincial electoral district in Quebec, Canada

Coordinates: 46°58′N 71°17′W

Quebec electoral district

Provincial electoral district
- Legislature: National Assembly of Quebec
MNA
Marie-Josée Hélie
Conservative
- District created: 1867
- First contested: 1867
- Last contested: 2026

Demographics
- Electors (2014): 55,950
- Area (km²): 180.6
- Census division(s): Quebec City (part), La Jacques-Cartier (part)
- Census subdivision(s): Quebec City (part), Sainte-Brigitte-de-Laval

Montmorency (French pronunciation: [mɔ̃mɔʁɑ̃si]) is a provincial electoral district in the Capitale-Nationale region of Quebec, Canada. It comprises part of the Beauport borough of Quebec City and the municipality of Sainte-Brigitte-de-Laval.

It was created for the 1867 election (and an electoral district of that name existed earlier in the Legislative Assembly of the Province of Canada and the Legislative Assembly of Lower Canada).

In the change from the 2001 to the 2011 electoral map, it lost much of its territory to the new electoral district of Charlevoix–Côte-de-Beaupré.

It was named after François de Laval the first Roman Catholic bishop in New France.

== Members of the Legislative Assembly / National Assembly ==
Legislature	Years	Member	Party
1st	1867–1871	Joseph-Édouard Cauchon	Conservative
2nd	1871–1872	Joseph-Édouard Cauchon	Conservative
2nd	1872–1874	Joseph-Édouard Cauchon	Conservative
2nd	1874–1875	Auguste-Réal Angers	Conservative
3rd	1875–1878	Auguste-Réal Angers	Conservative
4th	1878–1881	Charles Langelier	Liberal
5th	1881–1886	Louis-Georges Desjardins	Conservative
6th	1886–1890	Louis-Georges Desjardins	Conservative
7th	1890–1890	Charles Langelier	Liberal
7th	1890–1892	Charles Langelier	Liberal
8th	1892–1896	Thomas Chase Casgrain	Conservative
8th	1896–1897	Édouard Bouffard	Conservative
9th	1897–1900	Édouard Bouffard	Conservative
10th	1900–1904	Louis-Alexandre Taschereau	Liberal
11th	1904–1907	Louis-Alexandre Taschereau	Liberal
11th	1907–1908	Louis-Alexandre Taschereau	Liberal
12th	1908–1912	Louis-Alexandre Taschereau	Liberal
13th	1912–1916	Louis-Alexandre Taschereau	Liberal
14th	1916–1919	Louis-Alexandre Taschereau	Liberal
15th	1919–1923	Louis-Alexandre Taschereau	Liberal
16th	1923–1927	Louis-Alexandre Taschereau	Liberal
17th	1927–1931	Louis-Alexandre Taschereau	Liberal
18th	1931–1935	Louis-Alexandre Taschereau	Liberal
19th	1935–1936	Louis-Alexandre Taschereau	Liberal
20th	1936–1939	Joseph-Félix Roy	Union Nationale
21st	1939–1944	Jacques Dumoulin	Liberal
22nd	1944–1948	Jacques Dumoulin	Liberal
23rd	1948–1952	Yves Prévost	Union Nationale
24th	1952–1956	Yves Prévost	Union Nationale
25th	1956–1960	Yves Prévost	Union Nationale
26th	1960–1962	Yves Prévost	Union Nationale
27th	1962–1966	Yves Prévost	Union Nationale
28th	1966–1970	Gaston Tremblay	Union Nationale
29th	1970–1973	Marcel Bédard	Liberal
30th	1973–1976	Marcel Bédard	Liberal
31st	1976–1981	Clément Richard	Parti Québécois
32nd	1981–1985	Clément Richard	Parti Québécois
33rd	1985–1989	Yves Séguin	Liberal
34th	1989–1990	Yves Séguin	Liberal
34th	1991–1994	Jean Filion	Parti Québécois
35th	1994–1995	Jean Filion	Parti Québécois
35th	1995–1998	Jean Filion	Independent
36th	1998–2003	Jean-François Simard	Parti Québécois
37th	2003–2007	Raymond Bernier	Liberal
38th	2007–2008	Hubert Benoît	Action démocratique
39th	2008–2012	Raymond Bernier	Liberal
40th	2012–2014	Michelyne St-Laurent	Coalition Avenir Québec
41st	2014–2018	Raymond Bernier	Liberal
42nd	2018–2022	Jean-François Simard	Coalition Avenir Québec
43rd	2022–2026	Jean-François Simard	Coalition Avenir Québec
44th	2026–Present	Marie-Josée Hélie	Conservative

== Election results ==
2026 Quebec general election
** Preliminary results — Not yet official **
Party	Candidate	Votes	%	±%
Conservative	Marie-Josée Hélie	19,482	43.81	+17.75
Parti Québécois	Nathalie Gagnon	9,951	22.38	+11.10
Coalition Avenir Québec	Jean-François Simard	5,689	12.79	−32.39
Liberal	René-Paul Coly	5,145	11.57	+6.92
Québec solidaire	Annie-Pierre Bélanger	3,853	8.67	−3.38
Parti nul	Renaud Blais	222	0.50	
Parti accès propriété et équité	Pierre Gosselin	90	0.20	
Marxist–Leninist	Jean Bédard	34	0.08	
Total valid votes		44,466	100.00	
Total rejected ballots				
Turnout			77.22	
Electors on the lists				
Conservative gain from Coalition Avenir Québec		Swing		+17.75
Source: Élections Québec

2022 Quebec general election
Party	Candidate	Votes	%	±%
Coalition Avenir Québec	Jean-François Simard	19,124	45.18	-5.69
Conservative	Mylene Bouchard	11,031	26.06	+22.27
Québec solidaire	Annie-Pierre Bélanger	5,100	12.05	-1.09
Parti Québécois	Cynthia Therrien	4,773	11.28	+0.67
Liberal	Mustapha Berri	1,969	4.65	-13.95
Green	Nicholas Lescarbeau	274	0.65	-0.75
Marxist–Leninist	Jean Bédard	55	0.13	-0.04
Total valid votes		42,326	98.85	
Total rejected ballots		494	1.15	
Turnout		42,820	73.94	
Electors on the lists		57,913		

2018 Quebec general election
Party	Candidate	Votes	%	±%
Coalition Avenir Québec	Jean-François Simard	20,233	50.87	+17.04
Liberal	Marie France Trudel	7,397	18.6	-21.82
Québec solidaire	Marie-Christine Lamontagne	5,225	13.14	+8.46
Parti Québécois	Alexandre Huot	4,221	10.61	-6.5
Conservative	Daniel Beaulieu	1,507	3.79	+1.39
Independent	Jean-François Simard	561	1.41	
Green	Nicholas Lescarbeau	558	1.4	+0.44
Marxist–Leninist	Jean Bédard	69	0.17	
Total valid votes		39,771	98.02	
Total rejected ballots		802	1.98	
Turnout		40,573	70.96	
Eligible voters		57,179		
Coalition Avenir Québec gain from Liberal		Swing		+19.43
Source(s) "Rapport des résultats officiels du scrutin". Élections Québec.

2014 Quebec general election
Party	Candidate	Votes	%
Liberal	Raymond Bernier	17,113	40.42
Coalition Avenir Québec	Michelyne St-Laurent	14,323	33.83
Parti Québécois	Michel Guimond	7,242	17.11
Québec solidaire	Jean-Pierre Duchesneau	1,981	4.68
Conservative	Adrien Pouliot	1,015	2.40
Green	Marielle Parent	407	0.96
Option nationale	Jean Bouchard	255	1.51
Total valid votes		42,336	98.89
Total rejected ballots		476	1.11
Turnout		42,812	77.00
Electors on the lists		55,950	–

2012 Quebec general election
Party	Candidate	Votes	%	±%
Coalition Avenir Québec	Michelyne St-Laurent	16,239	38.21	+4.84
Liberal	Raymond Bernier	14,117	33.22	-4.09
Parti Québécois	Michel Létourneau	8,736	20.56	-4.37
Québec solidaire	Lucie Charbonneau	1,460	3.44	+1.16
Option nationale	Jean Bouchard	755	1.78	
Independent	Martin Roussel	517	1.22	
Middle Class	Jean Lavoie	417	0.98	
Équipe Autonomiste	Maryse Belley	155	0.36	
Parti indépendantiste	Luc Duranleau	99	0.23	-0.13
Total valid votes		42,495	98.70	–
Total rejected ballots		559	1.30	–
Turnout		43,054	78.36	
Electors on the lists		54,942	–	–
Coalition Avenir Québec gain from Liberal		Swing		+4.46

^ Change is from redistributed results. CAQ change is from ADQ.

2008 Quebec general election
Party	Candidate	Votes	%	±%
Liberal	Raymond Bernier	12,536	36.52	+13.90
Action démocratique	Hubert Benoit	11,375	33.14	−18.41
Parti Québécois	Jacques Nadeau	8,784	25.59	+5.34
Québec solidaire	Lucie Charbonneau	751	2.19	+0.28
Green	Jacques Legros	726	2.12	–
Parti indépendantiste	Luc Duranleau	153	0.45	–

2007 Quebec general election
Party	Candidate	Votes	%	±%
Action démocratique	Hubert Benoit	20,796	51.55	
Liberal	Raymond Bernier	9,124	22.62	
Parti Québécois	Daniel Leblond	8,171	20.25	
Québec solidaire	Jacques Legros	772	1.91	
Independent	François Martin	157	0.39	
Christian Democracy	Denise Jetté-Cloutier	149	0.37	

2003 Quebec general election
Party	Candidate	Votes	%
Liberal	Raymond Bernier	17,113	40.42
Action démocratique	Jean-François Paquet	14,323	33.83
Parti Québécois	Jean-François Simard	7,242	17.11
UFP	Magali Paquin	1,981	4.68
Total valid votes		42,336	98.89
Total rejected ballots		476	1.11
Turnout		42,812	77.00
Electors on the lists		55,950	–

1998 Quebec general election
Party	Candidate	Votes	%
Parti Québécois	Jean-François Simard	19,946	45.16
Liberal	Jacques Langlois	14,818	33.55
Action démocratique	Yves Leclerc	7,154	16.20
Independent	Jean Filion	1,774	4.02
Socialist Democracy	Linda Fick	267	0.60
Marxist–Leninist	Jean Bédard	204	0.46
Total valid votes		44,163	98.92
Total rejected ballots		481	1.08
Turnout		44.644	80.73
Electors on the lists		55,300	–

1995 Quebec referendum
Side	Votes	%
Oui	28,360	57.56
Non	20,914	42.44

1994 Quebec general election
Party	Candidate	Votes	%
Parti Québécois	Jean Filion	22,734	55.74
Liberal	France Lefrançois Bouchard	9,666	23.70
New Democratic	Jean-Marie Fiset	2,875	7.05
Independent	Jacques Noël	2,494	6.11
Independent	Martin Garant	1,371	3.36
Independent	Jacques Simard	962	2.36
Natural Law	Julie Cormier	534	1.31
Marxist–Leninist	Jean Bédard	150	0.37
Total valid votes		40,786	
Rejected and declined votes		944	
Turnout		41,730	80.74
Electors on the lists		51,684	

1992 Charlottetown Accord referendum
Side	Votes	%
Non	27,728	69.32
Oui	12,272	30.68

Quebec provincial by-election, 1991
Party	Candidate	Votes	%
Parti Québécois	Jean Filion	13,588	54.35
Liberal	Claude Desjardins	8,149	32.59
Green	Jean Ouimet	1,658	6.63
New Democratic	Jean-François Sirois	1,169	4.68
Independent	Jolly Taylor	439	1.76
Total valid votes		25,003	97.68
Total rejected ballots		595	2.32
Turnout		25,598	55.27
Electors on the lists		46,318	–

1989 Quebec general election
Party	Candidate	Votes	%
Liberal	Yves Séguin	20,653	59.95
Parti Québécois	Louis Bonenfant	11,280	32.74
New Democratic	Germaine Poirer	1,726	5.01
Independent	Martin Trudel	526	1.52
Marxist–Leninist	Jean Bédard	266	0.77
Total valid votes		34,449	97.72
Total rejected ballots		802	2.28
Turnout		35,251	55.27
Electors on the lists		46,641	–

1985 Quebec general election
Party	Candidate	Votes	%
Liberal	Yves Séguin	21,115	59.37
Parti Québécois	Jean Filion	11,173	32.74
Progressive Conservative	Yvon Careau	1,351	3.80
New Democratic	Michael Haberman	1,200	3.38
Independent	José Breton	513	1.44
Independent	Martin Trudel	112	0.31
Christian Socialism	Ronald Ouellet	101	0.28
Total valid votes		35,565	98.43
Total rejected ballots		567	1.57
Turnout		36,132	77.75
Electors on the lists		46,472	–

1981 Quebec general election
Party	Candidate	Votes	%
Parti Québécois	Clément Richard	21,791	62.48
Liberal	Jacques Langlois	12,238	35.09
Union Nationale	Gérard Boulet Jr.	710	2.03
Marxist–Leninist	Jean Bédard	140	0.40
Total valid votes		34,879	99.07
Total rejected ballots		329	0.93
Turnout		35,206	83.53
Electors on the lists		42,146	–

1980 Quebec referendum
Side	Votes	%
Non	19,589	50.64
Oui	19,097	49.36

1976 Quebec general election
Party	Candidate	Votes	%
Parti Québécois	Clément Richard	17,300	50.42
Liberal	Marcel Bédard	12,110	35.30
Union Nationale	Denise Deslauriers	3,187	9.29
Ralliement créditiste	L.-P.-Antoine Bélanger	1,713	4.99
Total valid votes		34,310	97.85
Total rejected ballots		755	2.15
Turnout		35,065	88.23
Electors on the lists		39,743	–

1973 Quebec general election
Party	Candidate	Votes	%
Liberal	Marcel Bédard	15,248	51.89
Parti Québécois	Clément Richard	9,275	31.56
Parti créditiste	Gaston Tremblay	3,863	13.15
Union Nationale	Pierre Linteau	999	3.40
Total valid votes		29,385	97.63
Total rejected ballots		714	2.37
Turnout		30,099	84.52
Electors on the lists		35,610	–

1970 Quebec general election
Party	Candidate	Votes	%
Liberal	Louis Vézina	9,714	32.65
Ralliement créditiste	Gaston Tremblay	9,674	32.51
Union Nationale	J.-Eugène Houde	6,337	21.30
Parti Québécois	Gérard Langlois	3,729	12.53
Independent	Jean-Guy Bolduc	300	1.01
Total valid votes		29,753	97.84
Total rejected ballots		657	2.16
Turnout		30,410	87.35
Electors on the lists		34,812	–

1966 Quebec general election
Party	Candidate	Votes	%
Union Nationale	Gaston Tremblay	14,151	54.25
Liberal	Réal Therrien	9,627	36.90
RIN	Guy Pouliot	1,423	5.46
Ralliement national	Maurice Talbot	885	3.39
Total valid votes		26,086	98.01
Total rejected ballots		529	1.99
Turnout		26,615	82.94
Electors on the lists		32,091	–

1962 Quebec general election
Party	Candidate	Votes	%
Union Nationale	Albert Gervais	5,717	50.67
Liberal	Jean-Paul Bédard	5,319	47.14
Action provinciale	Henri-Paul Tremblay	247	2.19
Total valid votes		11,283	98.98
Total rejected ballots		116	1.02
Turnout		11,399	88.32
Electors on the lists		12,907	–

1960 Quebec general election
Party	Candidate	Votes	%
Union Nationale	Yves Prévost	6,266	54.38
Liberal	Marc-André Drouin	5,257	45.62
Total valid votes		11,523	99.30
Total rejected ballots		81	0.70
Turnout		11,604	90.98
Electors on the lists		12,755	–

1956 Quebec general election
Party	Candidate	Votes	%
Union Nationale	Yves Prévost	6,628	59.53
Liberal	Marcel Létourneau	4,463	40.08
Labor-Progressive	Wilfrid Jolin	43	0.39
Total valid votes		11,134	98.66
Total rejected ballots		151	1.34
Turnout		11,285	90.72
Electors on the lists		12,440	–

1952 Quebec general election
Party	Candidate	Votes	%
Union Nationale	Yves Prévost	5,894	60.17
Liberal	Joseph Gignac	3,902	39.83
Total valid votes		9,796	98.56
Total rejected ballots		143	1.44
Turnout		9,939	86.92
Electors on the lists		11,434	–

1948 Quebec general election
Party	Candidate	Votes	%
Union Nationale	Yves Prévost	4,018	43.88
Liberal	Jacques Dumoulin	3,773	41.21
Union des électeurs	Louis-Philippe-Antoine Bélanger	1,365	14.91
Total valid votes		9,156	98.72
Total rejected ballots		119	1.28
Turnout		9,275	87.87
Electors on the lists		10,555	–

1944 Quebec general election
Party	Candidate	Votes	%
Liberal	Jacques Dumoulin	3,764	48.42
Union Nationale	Albert Sylvain	2,712	34.89
Union des électeurs	J.-Adélard Bélair	1,130	14.54
Bloc populaire	L.-Armand Lajeunesse	168	2.16
Total valid votes		7,774	99.17
Total rejected ballots		65	0.83
Turnout		7,839	80.89
Electors on the lists		9,691	–

1939 Quebec general election
Party	Candidate	Votes	%
Liberal	Jacques Dumoulin	1,960	50.91
Union Nationale	Hubert Simard	1,471	38.21
Action libérale nationale	Joseph-Oliva-Horace Philippon	373	9.69
Independent	Edgar Garneau	46	1.19
Total valid votes		3,850	98.52
Total rejected ballots		58	1.48
Turnout		3,908	87.21
Electors on the lists		4,481	–

1936 Quebec general election
Party	Candidate	Votes	%
Union Nationale	Joseph-Félix Roy	2,149	54.06
Liberal	Gérard Lacroix	1,826	45.94
Total valid votes		3,975	99.45
Total rejected ballots		22	0.55
Turnout		3,997	91.32
Electors on the lists		4,377	–

1935 Quebec general election
Party	Candidate	Votes	%
Liberal	Louis-Alexandre Taschereau	2,196	56.26
Action libérale nationale	Joseph-Félix Roy	1,707	43.74
Total valid votes		3,903	99.69
Total rejected ballots		12	0.31
Turnout		3,915	90.42
Electors on the lists		4,330	–

1931 Quebec general election
Party	Candidate	Votes	%
Liberal	Louis-Alexandre Taschereau	1,949	58.25
Conservative	Louis-Charles Francoeur	1,368	40.88
Independent	Aimé Dion	29	0.87
Total valid votes		3,346	99.23
Total rejected ballots		26	0.77
Turnout		3,372	89.28
Electors on the lists		3,777	–

1927 Quebec general election
Party	Candidate	Votes
Liberal	Louis-Alexandre Taschereau	Acclaimed
Electors on the lists		3,344

1923 Quebec general election
Party	Candidate	Votes	%
Liberal	Louis-Alexandre Taschereau	1,599	61.64
Independent	Armand Lavergne	995	38.36
Total valid votes		2,594	98.86
Total rejected ballots		30	1.14
Turnout		2,624	84.32
Electors on the lists		3,112	–

1919 Quebec general election
Party	Candidate	Votes
Liberal	Louis-Alexandre Taschereau	Acclaimed
Electors on the lists		3,114

1916 Quebec general election
Party	Candidate	Votes	%
Liberal	Louis-Alexandre Taschereau	1,732	68.62
Conservative	Aimé Dion	792	31.38
Total valid votes		2,524	99.33
Total rejected ballots		17	0.67
Turnout		2,541	79.83
Electors on the lists		3,183	–

1912 Quebec general election
Party	Candidate	Votes	%
Liberal	Louis-Alexandre Taschereau	1,441	54.52
Ligue nationaliste	Armand Lavergne	1,202	45.48
Total valid votes		2,643	99.59
Total rejected ballots		11	0.41
Turnout		2,654	85.09
Electors on the lists		3,119	–

1908 Quebec general election
Party	Candidate	Votes	%
Liberal	Louis-Alexandre Taschereau	1,335	62.41
Conservative	Charles Cauchon	804	37.59
Total valid votes		2,139	99.58
Total rejected ballots		9	0.42
Turnout		2,148	70.83
Electors on the lists		2,856	–

Quebec provincial by-election, 1907
Party	Candidate	Votes	%
Liberal	Louis-Alexandre Taschereau	1,416	71.08
Conservative	Jean-Baptiste Bernier	576	28.92
Total valid votes		1,992	99.20
Total rejected ballots		16	0.80
Turnout		2,008	70.83
Electors on the lists		2,835	–

1904 Quebec general election
Party	Candidate	Votes
Liberal	Louis-Alexandre Taschereau	Acclaimed
Electors on the lists		2,700

1900 Quebec general election
Party	Candidate	Votes	%
Liberal	Louis-Alexandre Taschereau	1,356	64.54
Conservative	Édouard Bouffard	745	35.46
Total valid votes		2,101	99.01
Total rejected ballots		28	0.99
Turnout		2,122	81.80
Electors on the lists		2,594	–

1897 Quebec general election
Party	Candidate	Votes	%
Conservative	Édouard Bouffard	1,053	51.32
Liberal	Joseph Dussault	999	48.68
Total valid votes		2,052	99.37
Total rejected ballots		28	0.23
Turnout		2,065	95.48
Electors on the lists		2,533	–

Quebec provincial by-election, 1896
Party	Candidate	Votes	%
Conservative	Édouard Bouffard	1,139	53.00
Liberal	Joseph-Pierre Turcotte	1,010	47.00
Total valid votes		2,149	98.71
Total rejected ballots		28	1.29
Turnout		2,177	95.48
Electors on the lists		2,280	–

1892 Quebec general election
Party	Candidate	Votes	%
Conservative	Thomas Chase Casgrain	1,151	55.07
Liberal	Charles Langelier	939	44.93
Total valid votes		2,090	99.62
Total rejected ballots		8	0.38
Turnout		2,098	89.51
Electors on the lists		2,344	–

Quebec provincial by-election, 1890
Party	Candidate	Votes
Liberal	Charles Langelier	Acclaimed

1890 Quebec general election
Party	Candidate	Votes	%
Liberal	Charles Langelier	1,073	52.99
Conservative	Louis-Georges Desjardins	952	47.01
Total valid votes		2,025	99.26
Total rejected ballots		15	0.74
Turnout		2,040	87.78
Electors on the lists		2,324	–

1886 Quebec general election
Party	Candidate	Votes	%
Conservative	Louis-Georges Desjardins	830	51.97
Liberal	Joseph-Pierre Turcotte	767	48.03
Total valid votes		1,597	98.89
Total rejected ballots		18	1.11
Turnout		1,615	85.36
Electors on the lists		1,892	–

1881 Quebec general election
Party	Candidate	Votes	%
Conservative	Louis-Georges Desjardins	792	51.10
Liberal	Charles Langelier	758	48.90
Total valid votes		1,550	98.85
Total rejected ballots		18	1.15
Turnout		1,568	86.30
Electors on the lists		1,817	–

1878 Quebec general election
Party	Candidate	Votes	%
Liberal	Charles Langelier	779	50.45
Conservative	Auguste-Réal Angers	765	49.55
Total valid votes		1,544	98.78
Total rejected ballots		19	1.12
Turnout		1,563	89.11
Electors on the lists		1,754	–

Quebec provincial by-election, 1875
Party	Candidate	Votes
Conservative	Auguste-Réal Angers	Acclaimed
Electors on the lists		1,726

Quebec provincial by-election, 1874
Party	Candidate	Votes	%
Conservative	Auguste-Réal Angers	835	79.83
Liberal	Georges Larue	211	20.17
Total valid votes		1,046	100.00
Turnout		1,046	61.06
Electors on the lists		1,713	–

Quebec provincial by-election, 1872
Party	Candidate	Votes
Conservative	Joseph-Édouard Cauchon	Acclaimed

1871 Quebec general election
Party	Candidate	Votes
Conservative	Joseph-Édouard Cauchon	Acclaimed
Electors on the lists		1,700

1867 Quebec general election
Party	Candidate	Votes
Conservative	Joseph-Édouard Cauchon	Acclaimed
Electors on the lists		1,782

== See also ==
- List of Quebec provincial electoral districts
- Canadian provincial electoral districts
