= Raymond Bernier =

Canadian politician

Member of the National Assembly of Quebec for Montmorency
- In office April 7, 2014 – October 1, 2018
- Preceded by: Michelyne St-Laurent
- Succeeded by: Jean-François Simard
- In office December 8, 2008 – September 4, 2012
- Preceded by: Hubert Benoît
- Succeeded by: Michelyne St-Laurent
- In office April 14, 2003 – March 26, 2007
- Preceded by: Jean-François Simard
- Succeeded by: Hubert Benoît

Personal details
- Born: November 6, 1952 (age 73) Quebec City, Quebec, Canada
- Party: Independent (federal); Liberal (provincial)
- Education: Cégep de Limoilou; Université Laval

Raymond Bernier (born November 6, 1952) is a Canadian politician in the province of Quebec. He was first elected to represent the riding of Montmorency in the National Assembly of Quebec in the 2003 provincial election, but was defeated in the 2007 provincial election by Hubert Benoît of the Action démocratique du Québec. He was subsequently re-elected in the 2008 provincial election. He is a member of the Quebec Liberal Party.

Born in Quebec City, Quebec, Bernier obtained a college degree in administrative sciences from the Cégep de Limoilou and a bachelor's degree in the same field at the Université Laval.

Bernier worked for three years as a financial management agent before working at the Commission de la santé et de la sécurité au travail (CSST). He served as the Socioeconomic Research and Planning Officer at the Treasury Board Secretariat in 1983 and 1984, at the Ministry of Transport from 1984 to 1986 and at the Ministry of Revenue from 1986 to 1990 and from 1991 to 2003.

He was also a councillor and substitute mayor for the municipality of Saint-Augustin-de-Desmaures in central for eight years. In addition to his election wins in 2003 and 2008, he was defeated as a Liberal candidate in La Peltrie in 1994. After his 2007 defeat, he worked as Chief Cabinet for Minister Monique Gagnon-Tremblay. In 2019, Bernier ran for elections as an independent candidate, but he was defeated by a Liberal Party candidate.

== Electoral record ==
=== Federal politics ===
2019 Canadian federal election: Beauport—Côte-de-Beaupré—Île d'Orléans—Charlevoix
Party	Candidate	Votes	%	±%	Expenditures
Bloc Québécois	Caroline Desbiens	18,407	36.35	+17.21	$10,197.29
Conservative	Sylvie Boucher	15,044	29.71	-3.82	none listed
Liberal	Manon Fortin	10,608	20.95	-5.94	none listed
New Democratic	Gérard Briand	2,841	5.61	-12.85	none listed
Green	Richard Guertin	1,355	2.68	+0.98	$5,913.35
No affiliation	Raymond Bernier	1,335	2.64	–	$5,886.96
People's	Jean-Claude Parent	1,045	2.06	–	none listed
Total valid votes/expense limit		50,635	98.11		
Total rejected ballots		976	1.89		
Turnout		51,611	67.33		
Eligible voters		76,657			
Bloc Québécois gain from Conservative		Swing		+10.52	
Source: Elections Canada

=== Provincial politics ===
2014 Quebec general election
Party	Candidate	Votes	%
Liberal	Raymond Bernier	17,113	40.42
Coalition Avenir Québec	Michelyne St-Laurent	14,323	33.83
Parti Québécois	Michel Guimond	7,242	17.11
Québec solidaire	Jean-Pierre Duchesneau	1,981	4.68
Conservative	Adrien Pouliot	1,015	2.40
Green	Marielle Parent	407	0.96
Option nationale	Jean Bouchard	255	1.51
Total valid votes		42,336	98.89
Total rejected ballots		476	1.11
Turnout		42,812	77.00
Electors on the lists		55,950	–

2012 Quebec general election
Party	Candidate	Votes	%	±%
Coalition Avenir Québec	Michelyne St-Laurent	16,239	38.21	+4.84
Liberal	Raymond Bernier	14,117	33.22	-4.09
Parti Québécois	Michel Létourneau	8,736	20.56	-4.37
Québec solidaire	Lucie Charbonneau	1,460	3.44	+1.16
Option nationale	Jean Bouchard	755	1.78	
Independent	Martin Roussel	517	1.22	
Middle Class	Jean Lavoie	417	0.98	
Équipe Autonomiste	Maryse Belley	155	0.36	
Parti indépendantiste	Luc Duranleau	99	0.23	-0.13
Total valid votes		42,495	98.70	–
Total rejected ballots		559	1.30	–
Turnout		43,054	78.36	
Electors on the lists		54,942	–	–
Coalition Avenir Québec gain from Liberal		Swing		+4.46

^ Change is from redistributed results. CAQ change is from ADQ.

2008 Quebec general election: Montmorency
Party	Candidate	Votes	%	±%
Liberal	Raymond Bernier	12,536	36.52	+13.90
Action démocratique	Hubert Benoit	11,375	33.14	−18.41
Parti Québécois	Jacques Nadeau	8,784	25.59	+5.34
Québec solidaire	Lucie Charbonneau	751	2.19	+0.28
Green	Jacques Legros	726	2.12	–
Parti indépendantiste	Luc Duranleau	153	0.45	–

2007 Quebec general election
Party	Candidate	Votes	%	±%
Action démocratique	Hubert Benoit	20,796	51.55	
Liberal	Raymond Bernier	9,124	22.62	
Parti Québécois	Daniel Leblond	8,171	20.25	
Québec solidaire	Jacques Legros	772	1.91	
Independent	François Martin	157	0.39	
Christian Democracy	Denise Jetté-Cloutier	149	0.37	

2003 Quebec general election
Party	Candidate	Votes	%
Liberal	Raymond Bernier	17,113	40.42
Action démocratique	Jean-François Paquet	14,323	33.83
Parti Québécois	Jean-François Simard	7,242	17.11
UFP	Magali Paquin	1,981	4.68
Total valid votes		42,336	98.89
Total rejected ballots		476	1.11
Turnout		42,812	77.00
Electors on the lists		55,950	–
