= Jean Filion =

Canadian politician

MNA for Montmorency
- In office 1991–1998
- Preceded by: Yves Séguin
- Succeeded by: Jean-François Simard

Personal details
- Born: March 22, 1951 (age 75) Quebec City, Quebec
- Party: Independent
- Other political affiliations: Parti Québécois (until 1995)

Jean Filion (born March 22, 1951) is a former Canadian politician who represented the electoral district of Montmorency in the National Assembly of Quebec from 1991 to 1998. He was a member of Parti Québécois.

He was the party's candidate in Montmorency in the 1985 provincial election but lost to Yves Séguin of the Quebec Liberal Party. He was first elected in a by-election on August 12, 1991, following Séguin's resignation, and was reelected in the 1994 election. He left the party to sit as an independent in 1995 and ran unsuccessfully for the mayoralty of Beauport in 1996. He ran as an independent candidate in the 1998 election, but was defeated by Jean-François Simard.

He was later charged with thirteen counts of fraud and breach of trust, after allegations that he diverted funds from his MNA expense budget into renovations for a building he owned. He was convicted in 2004 on eight of the thirteen counts, and sentenced to six months in jail. He was subsequently stripped of his designation as a chartered accountant by the Quebec Order of Chartered Accountants.

Due to his conviction, the National Assembly withheld a sizable "transition payment" that he would have been entitled to as an outgoing MNA. He filed a lawsuit against the provincial government in the Quebec Superior Court in 2012 for $52,617 in transition payments, $50,000 in moral damages and $42,000 to cover legal fees and expenses. In February 2013, Superior Court Justice Suzanne Hardy-Lemieux ruled that he was entitled to partial compensation of $29,699 for the transition payments, but rejected his claim for additional damages and expenses.
