= Hubert Benoit =

Canadian politician

MNA for Montmorency
- In office April 25, 2007 – November 5, 2008
- Preceded by: Raymond Bernier
- Succeeded by: Raymond Bernier

Personal details
- Born: February 25, 1963 (age 63)
- Party: Action démocratique du Québec
- Spouse: Karine Delarosbil

Hubert Benoit (born February 25, 1963) is a politician from Quebec, Canada. He was an Action démocratique du Québec Member of the National Assembly for the electoral district of Montmorency from 2007 to 2008.

Benoit holds a diploma from the Tourism and Hotel Institution of Quebec in human resources management and operation cost in restoration and followed additional courses and training in financial services at the Financial Security Chamber and at Great-West, an insurance company.

Before his election, he was a financial adviser and was also a manager and banquet directors at Quebec City area restaurants and also at Université Laval. He was also a member for the Association canadienne des sommeliers professionnels for six years and for an economic development sub-committee.

Benoit was first elected in the 2007 election with 51% of the vote. Liberal incumbent Raymond Bernier finished second with 22% of the vote. He took office on April 12, 2007.

Benoit's spouse Karine Delarosbil ran for the ADQ in the district of Bonaventure, but finished third with 12% of the vote, against Liberal cabinet minister Nathalie Normandeau (53%).
