= Yves Prévost =

Canadian politician and lawyer (1908–1997)

Member of the Legislative Assembly of Quebec for Montmorency
- In office 1948–1962
- Preceded by: Jacques Dumoulin
- Succeeded by: Albert Gervais

Leader of the Official Opposition of Quebec
- In office September 20, 1960 – January 11, 1961
- Preceded by: Georges-Émile Lapalme
- Succeeded by: Antonio Talbot

Personal details
- Born: July 11, 1908 Beauport, Quebec City, Quebec
- Died: November 27, 1997 (aged 89) Quebec City, Quebec
- Party: Union Nationale

Yves Prévost (July 11, 1908 – November 27, 1997) was a politician and lawyer in Quebec, Canada.

He was first elected in 1948 for the riding of Montmorency. He served as interim leader of the Union Nationale party and leader of the Opposition in the Legislative Assembly of Quebec from September 1960 to January 1961. He became party leader after UN leader and former premier Antonio Barrette lost the 1960 election and resigned his seat and the UN leadership a few months later.

In January 1961, he was replaced as interim UN leader and leader of the Opposition by Antonio Talbot, and he did not run in the 1962 election.

Prior to his provincial political career, Prevost served as mayor of the city of Beauport (now part of Quebec City) from 1948 to 1952 and was worked for the Beauport School Board for nearly 20 years at high-class various positions.

In 1956, he was made a Knight Commander of the Order of St. Gregory the Great.
