= Michelyne St-Laurent =

Canadian politician

MNA for Montmorency
- In office 2012–2014
- Preceded by: Raymond Bernier
- Succeeded by: Raymond Bernier

Personal details
- Born: 16 June 1948 (age 78) Quebec City, Quebec
- Party: Coalition Avenir Québec
- Profession: Lawyer

Michelyne St-Laurent (born 16 June 1948) is a Canadian politician. She was a member of the National Assembly of Quebec for the riding of Montmorency, first elected in the 2012 election. She was defeated in the 2014 election.
