= Parti présidentiel =

Political party

The Parti présidentiel (French pronunciation: [paʁti pʁezidɑ̃sjɛl]) was a political party in Quebec, Canada. It was founded on May 5, 1974 by former Liberal Party of Quebec Member of the National Assembly Yvon Dupuis. Dupuis founded the party after resigning from the leadership of the Ralliement créditiste du Québec. It was "a group that defended conservative ideas likely to bring together activists from the Union nationale or disappointed Créditistes."

Dupuis resigned from the leadership on October 21, 1974, and announced his withdrawal from political life. He was replaced by Yvon Brochu. On May 31, 1975, the party merged with the Union Nationale party.

== See also ==
- Politics of Quebec
- List of Quebec general elections
- National Assembly of Quebec
- Timeline of Quebec history
- List of political parties in Quebec
