= Gabriel Loubier =

Canadian politician (1932–2025)

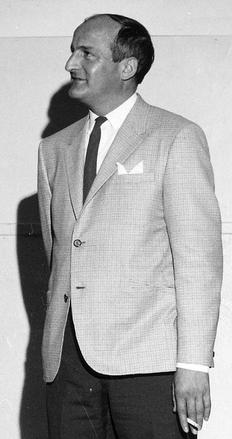
- Loubier in 1969

Member of the National Assembly of Quebec for Bellechasse
- In office 1962–1973
- Preceded by: Gustave Plante
- Succeeded by: Pierre Mercier

Leader of the Official Opposition of Quebec
- In office 1971–1973
- Preceded by: Jean-Jacques Bertrand
- Succeeded by: Jacques-Yvan Morin

Personal details
- Born: September 27, 1932 Black Lake, Quebec, Canada
- Died: October 1, 2025 (aged 93)
- Party: Union Nationale

Gabriel Loubier (September 27, 1932 – October 1, 2025) was a Canadian politician in Quebec. He served as leader of the Union Nationale party from 1971 to 1974, and as leader of the opposition in the National Assembly of Quebec from 1971 to 1973.

Born in Black Lake, Quebec, Loubier studied law at Laval University, and was admitted to the bar of Quebec in 1958. He was first elected to the Quebec legislature representing Bellechasse in 1962 and served as minister of tourism and fishing in the cabinets of Daniel Johnson and Jean-Jacques Bertrand from 1966 to 1970 and also as minister responsible for youth and sport from 1968 to 1970. Following the defeat of the Bertrand government in the 1970 provincial election, Loubier was a candidate in the June 1971 Union Nationale leadership convention defeating Marcel Masse on the third ballot to become party leader and leader of the Opposition. From October 25, 1971, to January 14, 1973, the Union Nationale temporarily changed its name to Unité Québec.

In the 1973 election, the Union Nationale won no seats and Loubier ceased to be leader of the opposition. He resigned as UN party leader in March 1974.

Loubier served on the board of directors of Megantic Metal and several firms in the steel industry before inheriting control of the family firm, Loubier Metal, from his father in 1985.

Loubier died on October 1, 2025, at the age of 93.

== Sources ==
- "Biography". Dictionnaire des parlementaires du Québec de 1792 à nos jours (in French). National Assembly of Quebec.

Party political offices
Preceded by Jean-Jacques Bertrand	Leader of the Union Nationale; 1971–1974	Succeeded by Maurice Bellemare (interim)
