= Édouard Bouffard =

Canadian politician

Édouard Bouffard (August 30, 1858 – December 12, 1903) was a lawyer and political figure in Quebec. He represented Montmorency in the Legislative Assembly of Quebec from 1896 to 1900 as a Conservative.

He was born in Saint-Laurent, Île d'Orléans, Canada East, the son of David Bouffard and Françoise Chabot, and educated at the Séminaire de Québec. He was called to the Quebec bar in 1884 and set up practice in Quebec City. He was first elected to the Quebec assembly in an 1896 by-election held after Thomas Chase-Casgrain was elected to the House of Commons. Bouffard was reelected in 1897 but defeated when he ran for reelection in 1900. In 1901, he married Mary Ann Bennet. He died in Quebec City at the age of 45.

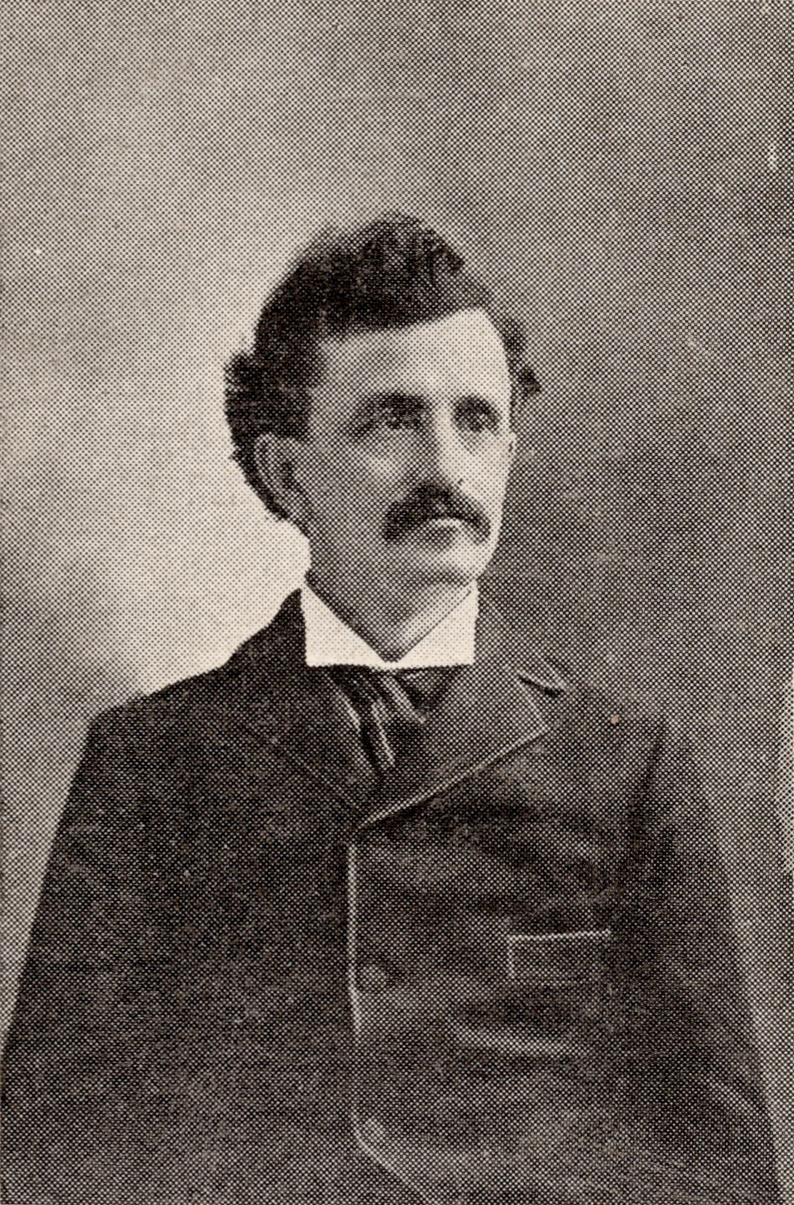
Édouard Bouffard, was a lawyer and a political figure
