= Les Démocrates =

Defunct provincial political party in Quebec

Les Démocrates (in English: The Democrats) was a provincial political party in Quebec, Canada, founded by former Ralliement créditiste du Québec leader Camil Samson and former Progressive Conservative Party of Canada federal cabinet minister Pierre Sévigny on November 18, 1978. It was renamed the Parti démocrate créditiste on January 1, 1980, a reference to the social credit theory of monetary economics. Samson joined the Liberal Party of Quebec on September 2, 1980. Sévigny remained as party leader and initially campaigned prior to the 1981 Quebec election but he did not stand as a candidate himself and the party was unable to field a slate of 10 candidates and dissolved prior to the election.

Social creditors who did not follow Samson into the Liberal Party may have joined the Parti credit social uni, which was formed in 1979 as a new provincial wing of the Social Credit Party of Canada.

== See also ==
- Politics of Quebec
- List of Quebec general elections
- List of Quebec premiers
- List of Quebec leaders of the Opposition
- National Assembly of Quebec
- Timeline of Quebec history
- Political parties in Quebec
