= Clément Richard =

Canadian lawyer, businessman, and politician (1939–2022)

Clément Richard (French pronunciation: [klemɑ̃ ʁiʃaʁ]; 17 February 1939 – 3 March 2022) was a Canadian lawyer, businessman and politician in Quebec. He represented Montmorency in the Quebec National Assembly as a member of the Parti Québécois from 1976 to 1985.

He was born in Quebec City, the son of J. Damase Richard and Léontine Bégin, and was educated at the Collège Saint-Jean-Eudes, the Collège Saint-Louis in Edmundston, the Université Laval and Georgetown University. He was a reporter for L'Action de Québec and then taught Canadian history at the Académie de Québec from 1963 to 1967. Richard was called to the Quebec bar in 1965. He ran unsuccessfully for a seat in the Quebec assembly in 1973, losing to Marcel Bédard. Richard served as President of the National Assembly from 1976 to 1980. He was a member of the Quebec cabinet, serving as Minister of Communications from 1980 to 1981 and Minister of Cultural Affairs from 1981 to 1985. Richard did not run for reelection in 1985. He was a vice-president for Lavalin and then president/director general for Lavalin Communications from 1986 to 1991. Richard was president and founder of MétéoMédia, Expotech Imax and the Quebec book publishing company Mondia. He served on the administrative council for Place des Arts, serving as president of the council from 1995 to 2002, and was also a member of the executive committee for the Musée des beaux-arts de Montréal.

Richard died on 3 March 2022, at the age of 83.

== Electoral record ==
1981 Quebec general election: Montmorency
Party	Candidate	Votes	%
Parti Québécois	Clément Richard	21,791	62.48
Liberal	Jacques Langlois	12,238	35.09
Union Nationale	Gérard Boulet Jr.	710	2.04
Marxist–Leninist	Jean Bédard	140	0.40
Total valid votes		34,879	100.00
Rejected and declined votes		327	
Turnout		35,206	83.53
Electors on the lists		42,146	

== Sources ==
- "Biography". Dictionnaire des parlementaires du Québec de 1792 à nos jours (in French). National Assembly of Quebec.
