= Ralliement créditiste du Québec =

Quebec Social Credit Rally Ralliement créditiste du Québec
- Leader: Camil Samson (1970–1972); Yvon Dupuis (1973–1974); Camil Samson (1975–1978)
- Founded: March 22, 1970
- Dissolved: November 12, 1978
- Preceded by: Ralliement des créditistes
- Succeeded by: Les Démocrates
- Ideology: Social credit Conservatism; Populism
- Colours: Green

The Ralliement créditiste du Québec (French pronunciation: [ʁalimɑ̃ kʁeditist dy kebɛk]) was a provincial political party in Quebec, Canada, that operated from 1970 to 1978 (the party was also known as the Parti créditiste from September to December 1973, contesting the 1973 provincial election under that name). It promoted social credit theories of monetary reform, and acted as an outlet for the expression of rural discontent. It was a successor to an earlier social credit party in Quebec, the Union des électeurs which ran candidates in the 1940s.

== History ==
=== Founding ===
At its 1963 annual convention in Hull, the Ralliement des créditistes, the Quebec wing of the Social Credit Party of Canada, split from the national organization. It also debated establishing a provincial party. De facto party leader Réal Caouette opposed the creation of a provincial party, and convinced delegates to accept the creation of a ten-member committee to study the proposal instead. Caouette argued that the creditistes had no organization and no money to create a provincial party. Furthermore, the social credit proposal for reform of the monetary system could only be implemented at the federal level (as the Social Credit government of William Aberhart in Alberta had learned when it tried to issue "prosperity certificates"). Most of the support for the creation of a provincial party came from the separatist element in the party, many of whom were also members of the Parti républicain du Québec led by Marcel Chaput.

However, the party later decided to test the provincial waters by contesting four by-elections held on October 8, 1969. All four candidates, who appeared on the ballot as "unaffiliated" candidates ("sans désignation"), were defeated, finishing in second place behind the Union Nationale candidates. The Quebec Liberal Party and the Parti Québécois did not contest those by-elections.

Despite those results, a provincial wing was established, under the name "Ralliement créditiste du Québec", to compete in the next provincial elections. Gaston Tremblay, a Christian Nationalist Member of the National Assembly (MNA) (elected as a Union Nationale member in 1966) became the first Ralliement créditiste MNA late in 1969. The party was officially founded on January 25, 1970. Camil Samson, the new party's president, was elected as leader of the party on March 22, 1970.

=== 1970 election ===
In the April 29, 1970 elections, the créditistes benefited from the decline of the conservative Union Nationale party and made a modest breakthrough, winning 12 seats in the National Assembly and 11.2% of the vote. The party was never able to build on this initial success because it was wracked continually by internal divisions.

On February 13, 1972, faced by challenges from within his party, Camil Samson resigned as leader, and a leadership convention was planned for March 18–19, 1972: Armand Bois (MNA for Saint-Sauveur) was chosen interim leader on February 21.

On March 16, Camil Samson was expelled from the party by nine of the créditiste MNAs (organized by Armand Bois) for criticizing some of the caucus members, and for not attending party meetings. On March 19, Samson declared himself to be the leader of a new créditiste group, and demanded to be seated in the National Assembly as a member of the "Registered Ralliement créditiste du Québec"', along with two other créditiste MNAs, Aurèle Audet (Abitibi-Ouest) and Bernard Dumont (Mégantic). However, the speaker of the National Assembly recognized Armand Bois as parliamentary leader of the party. On August 11, Samson, Dumont and Audet rejoined the "Ralliement créditiste du Québec".

On February 4, 1973, Yvon Dupuis was elected leader of the Ralliement créditiste du Québec over Samson. The party was renamed the Parti créditiste. Samson was named leader in the National Assembly. On February 21, Armand Bois, the former interim leader, was expelled from the party for saying at the February 4 leadership convention that Yvon Dupuis's entourage included members of the Montreal underworld. Bois sat as an independent créditiste until October 3, when he apologized for his statements and asked to be readmitted to the party.

Dupuis failed to win a by-election to enter the National Assembly, and was pressured to quit the leadership of the party. On May 5, 1974, Dupuis resigned as leader of the Parti créditiste, and formed the Parti présidentiel. Dupuis resigned as leader of that party on October 21, 1974, and ended his political career. The Parti présidentiel was merged into the Union Nationale a year later.

=== 1973 election ===
In the October 29, 1973 election, after campaigning under the name Parti créditiste, only two party members won election to the National Assembly, Fabien Roy and Camil Samson, although the party won 9.9% of the popular vote.

On December 1, 1974, Armand Bois announced the foundation of a new créditiste party, the Parti réformateur. That party merged with the Ralliement créditiste on November 18, 1975.

Before the 1976 election, there was a further split as the only two sitting Parti créditiste MNAs went their separate ways. Camil Samson became leader of the party, again called the Ralliement créditiste du Québec, on May 11, 1975. Fabien Roy was expelled from the party. It is not clear whether Roy was expelled on January 15, 1974 or November 3, 1975.

On December 14, 1975, Roy teamed up with former Liberal Jérôme Choquette to form the Parti national populaire under Choquette's leadership. The PNP and the Union Nationale, led by Rodrigue Biron, announced the merger of their two parties, but the idea was abandoned by the Union Nationale one month later.

=== 1976 election ===
In the November 15, 1976 general election, Camil Samson was the only créditiste elected, although the party won 4.63% of the popular vote across the province. (The PNP's Roy also won his seat, while Choquette was defeated.)

Samson's strong oratorical ability and sense of humour pleased the crowds who attended his rallies, and the party spent $150,000 on 15-minute television advertisements that aired almost every day, but his inability to get along with his colleagues had decimated Creditiste ranks over the years, and left the party largely composed of his own supporters who had followed him "through thick and thin". Samson promised interest-free loans and a guaranteed annual income, and emphasised traditional social credit themes including the rejection of socialism and the plight of the common man.

Some traditional Creditistes such as Carl O'Malley had followed Fabien Roy into the Parti Nationale Populaire (O’Malley was the PNP candidate in Notre-Dame-de-Grace riding) even through the PNP did not embrace social credit.

Samson was re-elected with 9011 votes (40%) in his riding of Rouyn-Noranda.

=== Dissolution ===
The Ralliement créditiste du Québec was dissolved as Camil Samson founded a new party, Les Démocrates, on November 12, 1978. Samson's partner in establishing the new party was Pierre Sévigny, a federal cabinet minister in the Progressive Conservative government of John Diefenbaker. Sévigny had resigned from the federal cabinet in disgrace because of his relationship with Gerda Munsinger, who was later revealed to be a spy for East Germany. That party was renamed the Parti démocrate créditiste on January 1, 1980; on September 2, 1980, Samson joined the Quebec Liberal Party caucus, and the Parti démocrate créditiste was dissolved. Samson was defeated as a Liberal candidate in the 1981 provincial election.

== Election results ==
| General election | # of candidates | # of seats won | % of popular vote |
|---|---|---|---|
| 1970 (RC) | 99 | 12 | 11.19% |
| 1973 (PC) | 109 | 2 | 9.92% |
| 1976 (RC) | 109 | 1 | 4.63% |
| 1976 (PNP) | 36 | 1 | 0.92% |
| 1981 (CSU) | 16 | 0 | 0.04% |
| 1985 (CSU) | 12 | 0 | 0.05% |
| 1989 (CSU) | 11 | 0 | 0.09% |

== See also ==
- Parti présidentiel
- Parti national populaire
- Les Démocrates/Parti démocrate créditiste
- Politics of Quebec
- List of Quebec general elections
- List of Quebec premiers
- List of Quebec leaders of the Opposition
- National Assembly of Quebec
- Timeline of Quebec history
- Political parties in Quebec
