= Premier of Quebec =

Head of government of Quebec

- Premier ministre du Québec
- Coat of arms of Quebec

- Flag of Quebec

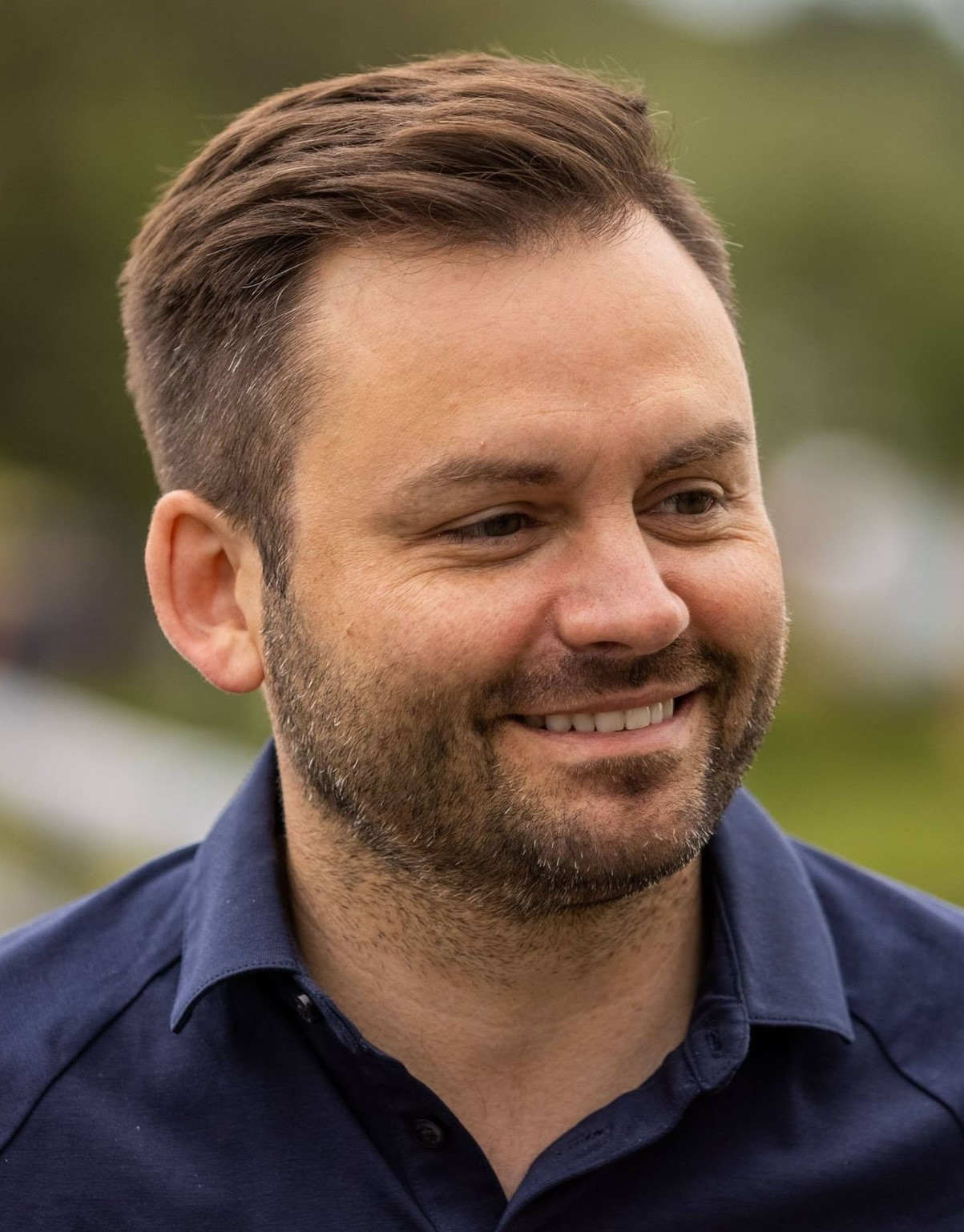
- Incumbent; Paul St-Pierre Plamondon since October 21, 2026
- Office of the Premier
- Style: Premier (informal)
- Status: Head of government
- Member of: National Assembly; Executive Council
- Reports to: National Assembly; Lieutenant Governor
- Residence: Édifice Price (Price Building)
- Seat: Quebec City
- Appointer: Lieutenant Governor of Quebec; with the confidence of the Quebec Legislature
- Term length: At His Majesty's pleasure; contingent on the premier's ability to command confidence in the legislative assembly
- Formation: July 15, 1867
- First holder: Pierre-Joseph-Olivier Chauveau
- Deputy: Deputy Premier of Quebec
- Salary: CA$270,120 (2023)
- Website: Official website

The premier of Quebec (French: premier ministre du Québec [pʁəmje ministʁ dy kebɛk] (masculine) or première ministre du Québec [pʁəmjɛʁ-] [feminine]) is the first minister and head of government of the Canadian province of Quebec. The current premier of Quebec is Paul St-Pierre Plamondon, who took office on October 21, 2026.

== Selection and qualifications ==
The premier of Quebec is appointed as president of the Executive Council by the lieutenant governor of Quebec, the viceregal representative of the King in Right of Quebec. The premier is most usually the head of the party winning the most seats in the National Assembly of Quebec and is normally a sitting member of the National Assembly. An exception to this rule occurs when the winning party's leader fails to win a riding. In that case, the premier would have to attain a seat by winning a by-election. This has happened, for example, to Robert Bourassa in 1985.

The role of the premier of Quebec is to set the legislative priorities on the opening speech of the National Assembly. The premier represents the leading party and must have the confidence of the assembly, as expressed by votes on budgets and other matters considered as confidence votes.

The term "premier" is used in English, while French employs "premier ministre", which translates directly to "prime minister". In at least one instance, the term "prime minister of the Province of Quebec" was used in an English-language advertisement. The term is also used for the Podium Ceremony of the annual Formula One Grand Prix du Canada in Montreal.

== See also ==
- Politics of Quebec
- List of premiers of Quebec by time in office
- Prime Minister of Canada
- Premier (Canada)
