= Union Nationale (Quebec) =

Former political party in Quebec, Canada

National Union Union nationale
- Founder: Maurice Duplessis
- Founded: 7 November 1935 (as a loose coalition of legislators); 20 June 1936 (as a political party)
- Dissolved: 19 June 1989
- Merger of: Quebec Conservative Party, Action libérale nationale
- Ideology: National conservatism Quebec nationalism Right-wing populism Anti-communism; Economic liberalism Clerico-nationalism; Authoritarianism
- Political position: Right-wing
- Colours: Blue, Red

The Union nationale (French pronunciation: [ynjɔ̃ nɑsjɔnal]) was a conservative and nationalist provincial political party in Quebec, Canada, that identified with Québécois autonomism. It was created during the Great Depression and held power in Quebec from 1936 to 1939, from 1944 to 1960, and from 1966 to 1970. The party was founded by Maurice Duplessis, who led it until his death in 1959.

The party was often referred to in English as the National Union, especially when it was still an electoral force, by both the media and, at times, the party.

== History ==
=== Origin ===
The party started when the Action libérale nationale, a group of dissidents from the Quebec Liberal Party, formed a loose coalition with the Conservative Party of Quebec. In the 1935 Quebec election, the two parties agreed to run only one candidate of either party in each riding. The Action libérale nationale (ALN) elected 26 out of 57 candidates and the Conservatives won 16 seats out of 33 districts.

Conservative leader Maurice Duplessis became Leader of the Opposition. He soon rose to prominence as he used the Standing Committee on Public Accounts to expose the corrupt practices of the Liberal government of Alexandre Taschereau and force it to call an early election.

Capitalizing on his success, Duplessis called a caucus meeting at Sherbrooke's Magog Hotel and received the support of 15 Conservatives and 22 ALN members in favour of a merger of the two parties under his leadership under the name Union nationale.

The new party had no formal ties to the federal Conservatives. It ran candidates in every district and won a majority of the seats in the 1936 election.

=== First term of office ===
Even though Duplessis had run on ideas inspired from the ALN platform, he soon alienated the more progressive members of his caucus. René Chaloult, Oscar Drouin, Joseph-Ernest Grégoire, Philippe Hamel, François Leduc and Adolphe Marcoux quit the party, while Rouville Beaudry and Grégoire Bélanger left politics.

The government adopted a farm credit policy in 1936, which was popular in rural areas where the party's most loyal base of supporters lived, but for the most part the administration of Maurice Duplessis protected the status quo. For instance, it gave the Catholic clergy government money to provide public education, health care and other social services.

Also, the legislature passed the Act to protect the Province Against Communistic Propaganda, better known as the Padlock Law, in 1937, which provided evidence of Duplessis's interest in appearing tough on communism.

=== World War II ===
Duplessis called an election shortly after Canada declared war against Germany. Federal Cabinet Member Ernest Lapointe, the Quebec lieutenant of Prime Minister William Lyon Mackenzie King, promised that no one would face conscription if voters supported the Liberals. The pledge was devastating to the Union Nationale, which lost the 1939 election.

While serving in His Majesty's Loyal Opposition, the party opposed Women's suffrage which was enacted by the government of Adélard Godbout in 1940.

=== Second term in office ===
The Union Nationale enjoyed a surge after a majority of Canadian voters allowed the federal government to pass conscription. Duplessis, who would later create a provincial income tax equal to 15 per cent of the federal income tax, claimed that the Godbout government failed to impose the strict respect for the principles established in the British North America Act 1867. The Liberals won a plurality of the vote in the 1944 election, finishing one point ahead of the Union Nationale. However, since rural areas were significantly overrepresented, the Union Nationale won 48 seats to the Liberals' 37, allowing Duplessis to return as premier.

World War II prosperity kept unemployment low. Machine politics, fiscal conservatism and a program of rural electrification consolidated the dominance of the Union Nationale over the province. The Duplessis government adopted the current flag of Quebec to replace the Union Jack. It won a landslide victory in the 1948 election. The Liberals were decimated; nearly all of their 14 MNAs were from Montreal's West Island. Godbout himself lost his own seat, leaving the Liberals without a full-time leader in the legislature.

On the debit side, Duplessis' relations with labour in general and trade unions in particular were difficult and led to a number of strikes. The government was also accused of being too strongly aligned with the Catholic clergy. Indeed, many priests openly supported the Duplessis government and attacked the Liberals by using the slogan Le ciel est bleu, l'enfer est rouge (Heaven is blue, hell is red)--a reference to the primary colours of both parties (blue for the UN, red for the Liberals). The government was also accused of discrimination against Jehovah's Witnesses, receiving insufficient royalties for the extraction the province's natural resources and allowing election fraud for its own benefit.

Nonetheless, the Union Nationale was re-elected in the 1952 election with a reduced majority, and in the 1956 election. Moreover, its influence was made obvious when its organization helped defeat Montreal Mayor Jean Drapeau in 1957 and helped John Diefenbaker's Progressive Conservatives win a majority of the province's seats in the 1958 federal election—something that the Tories hadn't done in over 60 years.

=== Modernization and last term of office ===
Duplessis died in 1959 and was succeeded by his Minister of Social Welfare, Paul Sauvé. Well aware that he faced, at most, two years before the next election, Sauvé saw the need to modernize one of the most conservative governments in Canada, and initiated a program of reform called "100 Days of Change." However, he also died after only three months in office.

Labour Minister Antonio Barrette took over a government that was increasingly seen as tired and unfocused, despite Sauvé's efforts at reform. He called an election in 1960, almost a year before it was due. The Union Nationale went into the contest under its third leader in less than a year, and narrowly lost to Jean Lesage's Liberals. The new government implemented a vast program of social changes, which is now known as the Quiet Revolution.

Daniel Johnson, Sr. became the leader of the Union Nationale in 1961. He was chosen by party delegates rather than by his colleagues only. The party was heavily defeated in the 1962 election, but it held a convention to discuss its platform in 1965 and opened its structures to card-carrying supporters. Johnson published a book called Égalité ou indépendance (Equality or independence), which appealed to a number of nationalist voters. Even though the Liberals won a plurality of the vote in the 1966 election, the Union Nationale eked out a narrow majority in part because rural areas were significantly overrepresented. Among the newly elected MLAs, there were three former federal politicians: Rémi Paul, Jean-Noël Tremblay and Clément Vincent. This was the last election which was won by the Union Nationale, and the last that a party other than the Quebec Liberals or the Parti Québécois formed government in Quebec until the 2018 Quebec general election.

Johnson set a slower pace, but sustained many reforms initiated by the Liberals. His administration established CEGEPs (Collèges d'enseignement général et professionnel, or 'College of General and Vocational Education') in 1967, abolished the Legislative Council of Quebec and completed the dam and the generating station of Manic-5 in 1968 and laid the groundwork for the public health insurance plan that would later be implemented by the Liberal government of Robert Bourassa.

=== Electoral decline ===
The official visit of French President Charles de Gaulle in Canada in 1967 and Daniel Johnson, Sr.'s sudden death in 1968 left the party divided between its nationalist wing and members who clearly positioned themselves as federalists. The latter prevailed when Jean-Jacques Bertrand won the party leadership over Jean-Guy Cardinal, but the controversy over a language legislation known as Bill 63 prompted a number of nationalist supporters, and legislators such as Antonio Flamand and Jérôme Proulx to join the Parti Québécois.

In addition, the Union Nationale lost a portion of its conservative base, including MNA Gaston Tremblay, to the Ralliement créditiste. Bertrand was unable to inspire voters and the party seemed to have lost touch with Quebec society. In the 1970 election, the Union Nationale was resoundingly defeated, winning only 17 seats. While it finished third in the popular vote behind the PQ, it still managed to become the Official Opposition.

Gabriel Loubier took over as leader and the party became known as Unité Québec from October 25, 1971 to January 14, 1973. The name change was not enough to halt the party's decline, and at the 1973 election, it was shut out of the legislature for the first time.

In 1974, former UN Cabinet Member and interim leader Maurice Bellemare won a by-election, and the party again was represented in the National Assembly. On May 31, 1975, the party merged with the tiny Parti présidentiel, a group of Créditiste dissidents led by Yvon Brochu, and kept the Union Nationale name.

In May 1976, business owner Rodrigue Biron, a former card-carrying Liberal supporter who had no experience in provincial politics, was chosen as party leader. Bellemare tried to flush out potential candidates for the leadership of the UN (such as former Liberal cabinet minister Jérôme Choquette) by calling a leadership convention for May 1976, but was unsuccessful. His impulsive policy statements and poor relations with the old guard of the party led to resignations of party officials, including Jacques Tétreault, who had been his most serious opponent for the party leadership. In September 1976, Biron abandoned a plan to unite his party with Choquette's Parti National Populaire, despite prior efforts made by the two groups.

The Union Nationale made a modest recovery in the 1976 election, winning 11 seats and 18.2% of the popular vote. While it came up just short of official party status in the legislature, the party appeared to be back from the brink. However, this did not last. From 1978 to 1980, five MNAs either crossed the floor, moved to federal politics or retired. The party bottomed out in 1980, when Biron resigned as leader and left the party to sit as an independent, and then joined the Parti Québécois a few months later. Michel Le Moignan, the MNA for the district of Gaspé, took over as interim leader. This left the once-mighty party with only five seats.

=== Collapse and deregistration ===
On January 9, 1981, federal Progressive Conservative Member of Parliament (MP) Roch LaSalle was acclaimed leader of the Union Nationale. In the April 1981 provincial election, the party lost all of its seats, and would never elect another MNA. La Salle resigned as leader and returned to federal politics—winning the by-election created by his resignation from parliament a few months earlier.

In 1982, lawyer Jean-Marc Beliveau, who had been appointed interim leader by the party executive following Lasalle's resignation, was elected Union Nationale leader by acclamation at what would be the party's final leadership convention. The party was $150,000 in debt, but appeared poised to return to the National Assembly when one public opinion poll in October 1984 showed it with 18% public support, its best showing since 1976, in the wake of the 1984 federal election in which the Progressive Conservatives won Quebec and the country in a landslide. However, Béliveau contested a June 3, 1985 by-election in Trois-Rivières and was defeated, finishing third with 16% of the vote. He tried to merge the UN with the fledgling Progressive Conservative Party of Quebec, but negotiations came to nothing. In September, after a group of veteran party members demanded his immediate resignation, Beliveau stepped down as leader.

The party appointed André Léveillé, a minister in the Johnson government, as interim party leader on October 28, 1985. Earlier, Léveillé had announced the formation of his own Parti du progrès, which he subsequently abandoned. Léveillé led the party into the December 2, 1985, general election. However, the party ran only 19 candidates, none of whom came close to being elected. It only won 0.23% of the popular vote, its worst showing ever. This would prove to be the final general election in which the Union Nationale fielded candidates.

By the 1980s, the Union Nationale no longer could rely on a significant get-out-the-vote organization or attract any media attention. The electorate was increasingly polarized over the constitutional issue, with conservative-leaning voters split between either the federalist Liberals or the sovereigntist Parti Québécois in provincial elections.

Furthermore, a number of small conservative and créditiste parties were created and were in competition with the Union Nationale for the few thousands of votes that were still up for grabs. Those parties included André Asselin's Progressive Conservative Party of Quebec, Jacques E. Tardif's Unité Québec and Jean-Paul Poulin's Parti crédit social uni. The situation accelerated the demise of the Union Nationale.

On June 19, 1989, Quebec chief electoral officer Pierre F. Côté withdrew the party's registration after the party was found to be nearly $350,000 in debt. As a result of this decision, it was no longer able to receive contributions or make expenditures. The next day, the interim leader of the party, Michel Le Brun, told a reporter that he would contest the decision before the Quebec Superior Court, arguing that the decision was unfair, and a violation of both the Canadian Charter of Rights and Freedoms and the Quebec Charter of Rights and Freedoms. It was the first time in Quebec that a party had lost its official status as a result of its debts.

Le Brun resurrected the Union Nationale under the name Parti Renaissance on June 26, 1992. It ran candidates in two by-elections in 1993, but the party did not field any eligible candidates in the 1994 election and lost its registration on August 27, 1994.

Although another attempt was made to revive the Union Nationale in 1998, it failed when the party failed to nominate enough candidates to be registered. The Action démocratique du Québec (ADQ) was established about at the same time and made a significant breakthrough in the districts that were once considered the base of the Union Nationale's support. This has continued with Coalition Avenir Québec, which has sometimes drawn comparisons with Union Nationale.

In 2009, former Union Nationale MNAs Serge Fontaine and Bertrand Goulet (both of whom had been among the last Union Nationale members elected to the legislature) announced the formation of a new Conservative Party of Quebec. Fontaine had asked Éric Caire of the ADQ to join the party and become its leader, with a view to attract disaffected ADQ supporters, but this did not materialize and Caire now sits as a member of the Coalition Avenir Québec.

The Parti démocratie chrétienne du Québec, a minor political party which garnered less than 1% of the popular vote, was founded in 2000 and emulated the Union Nationale by combining moderate Quebec nationalism with Christian social conservatism. It changed its name in 2012 to the Parti unité nationale. It has been defunct since 2018.

=== 2020 re-registration ===
A new Union Nationale party was registered in 2020 by Jonathan Blanchette who ran as the party's only candidate in the 2022 Quebec general election, receiving 159 votes in Abitibi-Ouest. The new Union Nationale was founded in opposition to health restrictions during the COVID-19 pandemic in Canada and to promote direct democracy.

The party stood in the 2025 Terrebonne provincial by-election, coming in 8th place with 95 votes (0.42%).

The party's registration was withdrawn by the Director General of Elections in May 2026 after the discovery of "non-compliant contributions". Blanchette announced that he would file an appeal to challenge the decision.

== Vocabulary ==
The media claimed that the Parti Québécois was going through a phase of Union-Nationalization (French: unionnationalisation) when, in the mid-1980s, it chose Pierre-Marc Johnson, the younger son of Daniel Johnson, Sr., as its leader and put the issue of Quebec sovereignty on the back burner.

== Party leaders ==
Leader	District (Region)	Years of service	Background	Selection as Leader
Maurice Duplessis	Trois-Rivières (Mauricie)	1935–1959	Lawyer	Confirmed as UN leader by caucus on June 20, 1936
Paul Sauvé	Deux-Montagnes (Laurentides)	1959–1960	Lawyer; Army officer	Chosen by caucus on September 10, 1959
Antonio Barrette	Joliette (Lanaudière)	1960	Machinist; Insurance Agent	Chosen by caucus on January 8, 1960
Yves Prévost (interim)	Montmorency (Québec)	1960–1961	Lawyer	Chosen by caucus on September 16, 1960
Antonio Talbot (interim)	Chicoutimi (Saguenay-Lac-Saint-Jean)	1961	Lawyer	Chosen by caucus on January 11, 1961
Daniel Johnson, Sr.	Bagot (Montérégie)	1961–1968	Lawyer	Won leadership convention on September 23, 1961; Defeated Jean-Jacques Bertrand on the first ballot
Jean-Jacques Bertrand	Missisquoi (Eastern Townships)	1968–1971	Lawyer	Won leadership convention on June 21, 1969; Defeated Jean-Guy Cardinal on the first ballot
Gabriel Loubier	Bellechasse (Chaudière-Appalaches)	1971–1974	Lawyer	Won leadership convention on June 19, 1971; Defeated Marcel Masse on the third ballot
Maurice Bellemare (interim)	Johnson (Montérégie)	1974–1976	Timber Scaler	Chosen by caucus on March 30, 1974
Rodrigue Biron	Lotbinière (Chaudière-Appalaches)	1976–1980	Small business owner; Mayor of Sainte-Croix, Quebec	Won leadership convention on May 22, 1976; Defeated Jacques Tétreault on the first ballot
Michel Le Moignan (interim)	Gaspé (Gaspésie–Îles-de-la-Madeleine)	1980–1981	Catholic priest	Chosen by caucus on March 3, 1980
Roch La Salle	n/a	1981	Member of Parliament for Joliette; Public relations officer Sales manager	Won leadership convention on January 9, 1981; Unopposed
Jean-Marc Béliveau	n/a	1981–1985	Lawyer	Appointed interim leader August 20, 1981; acclaimed at leadership convention on October 24, 1982.
Maurice Bouillon (acting)	n/a	1985	School principal	As party president, Bouillon served as acting leader between the resignation of Béliveau on September 21, 1985, and the appointment of André Léveillé as interim leader on October 28, 1985.
André Léveillé	n/a	1985	Accountant and former UN cabinet minister	Appointed party leader on October 28, 1985 and led the UN into the 1985 Quebec election.
Charles Thibault (acting)	n/a	1986	n/a	Appointed acting party leader in January 1986.
Paul Poulin	n/a	1986–1987	Building contractor	Appointed party leader August 10, 1986.
Justin Beaudoin	n/a	1987–1988	n/a	Appointed acting party leader in March 1987.
Michel Le Brun (acting)	n/a	1988–1989 1992–1994	Lawyer	Became interim party leader following Poulin's resignation on March 24, 1987. Party de-registered on June 19, 1989. Le Brun re-registered the party under the name Parti Renaissance on June 26, 1992.
Raymond De Martin	n/a	2020–2022	n/a	The party was re-registered on October 28, 2020 under the name Union Nationale with Raymond De Martin as leader.
Michel Le Brun	n/a	2022	Lawyer	Became acting party leader.
Jonathan "Jo L'Indigo" Blanchette	n/a	2022–2026	n/a	Appointed party leader by Michel Le Brun.

== General election results ==
Election	Leader	# of candidates	# of seats won	Change ±	% of popular vote	Legislative role
1936	Maurice Duplessis	90	76 / 90	▲44^{1}	56.9%	Majority Government
1939	Maurice Duplessis	85	15 / 86	▼61	39.1%	Official Opposition
1944	Maurice Duplessis	91	48 / 91	▲33	38.0%	Majority Government
1948	Maurice Duplessis	91	82 / 92	▲34	51.2%	Majority Government
1952	Maurice Duplessis	91	68 / 92	▼14	50.5%	Majority Government
1956	Maurice Duplessis	93	72 / 93	▲4	51.8%	Majority Government
1960	Antonio Barrette	95	43 / 95	▼29	46.7%	Official Opposition
1962	Daniel Johnson, Sr.	95	31 / 95	▼12	42.2%	Official Opposition
1966	Daniel Johnson, Sr.	108	56 / 108	▲25	40.8%	Majority Government
1970	Jean-Jacques Bertrand	108	17 / 108	▼29	19.7%	Official Opposition
1973	Gabriel Loubier	110	0 / 110	▼17	4.9%	No seats
1976	Rodrigue Biron	108	11 / 110	▲11	18.2%	Third Party
1981	Roch LaSalle	121	0 / 122	▼11	4.0%	No seats
1985	André Léveillé	19	0 / 122	Steady	0.2%	No seats
2022	Jonathan Blanchette	1	0 / 125	Steady	<0.00001%	No seats

^{1} Compared to the 1935 election in which the Action libérale nationale, led by Paul Gouin, and the Quebec Conservative Party, led by Maurice Duplessis elected, which elected 42 MLAs (27 ALN and 15 Conservatives) running as an electoral alliance under the banner of the Union nationale. The two parties formally merged prior to the 1936 election.

== See also ==
- Coalition Avenir Québec
- Clerico-nationalism
- Parti nationaliste chrétien
- Action démocratique du Québec
- Political parties in Quebec
- List of Quebec general elections
- National Assembly of Quebec
- Parti conservateur du Québec
- Parti National Populaire
- Politics of Quebec
- Timeline of Quebec history
- Union Nationale leadership elections
