= John H. Long (political candidate) =

Canadian political figure

John H. Long is a Canadian political figure. He has sought election to the House of Commons of Canada and the Legislative Assembly of Ontario on five occasions and has run for the leadership of the Social Credit Party of Canada, the Progressive Conservative Party of Canada, and the Canadian Alliance. He is strongly influenced by social credit economic theories and has often called for reform of the Bank of Canada.

== Early candidacies ==
Long first sought election to the Canadian House of Commons in 1974, when he ran as a Social Credit candidate in Waterloo—Cambridge. He sought the party's leadership two years later, following the resignation of Réal Caouette. Long received thirty-one votes out of 1,143 on the first ballot and withdrew from the contest before the second round. A Montreal Gazette article from this period described him as manufacturer based in Cambridge, Ontario.

He ran for Cambridge in the 1977 Ontario provincial election, appearing on the ballot as an independent candidate. He was presumably still aligned at this time with the federal Social Credit Party, which did not have a provincial affiliate in Ontario. (The official provincial wing of the party had previously been taken over by a group of neo-Nazis, to which Long had no connection.)

Long joined the Liberal Party of Canada in the 1980s and ran for delegate status at the party's 1984 leadership convention. The Cambridge branch of the party subsequently expelled him, saying that he had tried to recruit new members to support a "fusion" candidate who would be supported by both the Liberals and the New Democratic Party. (This initiative was undertaken without support from either party.) Long later sought the Progressive Conservative nomination in Cambridge for the 1988 federal election.

Long also ran mayor of Cambridge in 1985.

== 1990s campaigns ==
Long campaigned for the leadership of the Progressive Conservative Party of Canada in 1993, following the resignation of Brian Mulroney. He promoted monetary reform, called for an end to official bilingualism in Canada, and said that he wanted to succeed John Crow as governor of the Bank of Canada. Considered a fringe candidate, he nonetheless appeared at a public debate in Montreal with Kim Campbell, Jean Charest, and other contenders. He received no delegate support and withdrew from the contest before the party's convention. He later sought the Progressive Conservative nomination in Waterloo for the 1993 federal election but received only two votes.

Long then ran for Guelph—Wellington in the 1993 election as a candidate of the Canada Party, an ideological successor to Social Credit. He was sixty years old at the time and lived in Guelph.

He wanted to seek the Reform Party nomination for a 1995 by-election in Brome—Missisquoi, Quebec but his candidacy was rejected by the party. He instead ran as a candidate of John Turmel's Abolitionist Party (another ideological successor to Social Credit) and finished a distant last in a field of ten candidates. He later ran as an independent candidate in Cambridge in the 1997 federal election.

Long supported the Progressive Conservative Party of Ontario in the 1995 provincial election. He later criticized party leader Mike Harris and described the party's "Common Sense Revolution" as having been a "big bank revolution."

Long was the first declared candidate in the Progressive Conservative Party of Canada's 1998 leadership election. He supported a merger of the Progressive Conservative and Reform parties, favoured bank mergers, and said that the Bank of Canada should set up reserve banks that would leave one hundred per cent of their deposit liabilities with the central bank. He also opposed the Canada-United States Free Trade Agreement and sought to peg the Canadian dollar at sixty-eight cents relative to the American dollar. During this contest, Long described himself as a "product developer, mechanical engineer, environmentalist and homespun economist." He withdrew from the campaign in July 1998, before voting took place.

Long later sought the leadership of the Canadian Alliance in 2000, describing himself as a populist and calling for more plebiscites on controversial issues. Describing right wing and left wing labels as passé, he referred to himself as "an ultra-right-wing libertarian with a great, big, bushy socialist tail." He once again withdrew from the contest before voting took place.

He sought the Progressive Conservative nomination in Bruce—Grey—Owen Sound for the 2000 federal election, but was not given a response by the party. Long reserved the rights to the name, "The Common Sense People's Party of Ontario," with Elections Ontario in 2002, but he did not seek election under the party name. He does not appear to have been active in politics since this time.

== IMICO and Kanmet controversies ==
In 1992, Long purchased an abandoned IMICO foundry in Guelph for one dollar. The foundry's previous owners had fled the country, leaving behind a company that was over one million dollars in debt.

One year after buying the property, Long was informed by the Ontario Ministry of Environment and Energy that he would be required to clean up toxic wastes at the site. The cost was estimated at half a million dollars. Long described the charge as politically motivated, said that the site was not producing new contaminants, and refused to pay.

On December 31, 1993, Long transferred ownership of the site to the Assembly of the Church of the Universe, a religious sect based in Hamilton devoted to nudism and sacramental marijuana use. He argued that he was no longer responsible for the property after the transfer, although the ministry disagreed. In 1997, he was fined ten thousand dollars for an environmental offense.

Long also purchased an abandoned Kanmet Castings foundry in Cambridge for one dollar during the same period. In January 1996, he was sentenced to three months in jail and fined seventy-two thousand dollars for the improper storage of PCBs on the site. This controversy took place during the 1997 election.

The Assembly of the Church of the Universe moved its headquarters from the IMICO foundry in Guelph to the Kanmet foundry in Cambridge in 1998, with Long's permission. The city of Cambridge later tried to evict the church from the foundry, without success. In late 1998, the city reluctantly purchased the foundry from Long for fifty-eight thousand dollars and forgave him nine hundred thousand dollars in back taxes and hydro expenses. The church was forced to leave the Cambridge area shortly thereafter.

Long has also served time in prison for infractions of Ontario's Highway Traffic Act and for refusing to pay a fine for improper labour practices, and he has been fined for evading payment of the retail sales tax. When asked about his convictions in 2000, he said, "I'm not a criminal. I'm a firm believer in civil disobedience. I'm like Mahatma Gandhi in that regard."

== Electoral record ==
Federal

1997 Canadian federal election: Cambridge
Party	Candidate	Votes	%	±%	Expenditures
Liberal	Janko Peric	17,673	36.74	−2.52	$47,605
Reform	Bill Donaldson	10,767	22.38	−11.15	$57,325
New Democratic	Mike Farnan	9,813	20.40	+15.11	$53,588
Progressive Conservative	Larry Olney	9,299	19.33	+1.99	$48,139
Independent	John H. Long	311	0.65		$0
Independent	Jim Remnant	237	0.49		$0
Total valid votes		48,100	100.00		
Total rejected ballots		254			
Turnout		48,354	64.77	−1.75	
Electors on the lists		74,659			
Percentage change figures are factored for redistribution.
Sources: Official Results, Elections Canada and Financial Returns, Elections Canada.

Canadian federal by-election, February 13, 1995: Brome—Missisquoi
Party	Candidate	Votes	%	±%	Expenditures
Liberal	Denis Paradis	19,078	51.02	+14.36	$54,562
Bloc Québécois	Jean-François Bertrand	15,764	42.16	+1.40	$53,734
Progressive Conservative	Guy Lever	1,235	3.30	−13.85	$36,225a
Reform	Line Maheux	517	1.38		$21,755
New Democratic Party	Paul Vachon	371	0.99	−0.27	$9,325
Christian Heritage	Jean Blaquière	126	0.34		$2,321
Non-Affiliated	Yvon V. Boulanger	107	0.29		$3,816
Green	Éric Ferland	101	0.27		$412
Natural Law	Michel Champagne	77	0.21	−1.08	$6,538
Abolitionist	John H. Long	15	0.04	−1.61	$1,219
Total valid votes		37,391	100.00		
Total rejected ballots		288			
Turnout		37,679	64.32	−12.32	
Electors on the lists		58,579			
a- Does not include unpaid claims.

1993 Canadian federal election: Guelph—Wellington
Party	Candidate	Votes	%	Expenditures
Liberal	Brenda Chamberlain	24,359	39.24	$42,976
Reform	Gerry Organ	15,483	24.94	$45,760
Progressive Conservative	Bill Scott	12,825	20.66	$57,999
Non-Affiliated	Frank Maine	3,465	5.58	$29,745
New Democratic Party	Alex Michalos	2,904	4.68	$27,092
National	Maggie Laidlaw	2,018	3.25	$6,098
Green	Simon C. Francis	318	0.51	$0
Natural Law	David W. Mitchell	255	0.41	$12
Libertarian	Tom Bradburn	247	0.40	$0
Canada Party	John H. Long	108	0.17	$600
N/A (Renewal)	Anna Di Carlo	78	0.13	$0
Abolitionist	Andrew Tait	20	0.03	$0
Total valid votes		62,080	100.00	
Total rejected ballots		583	0.93	
Turnout		62,663	67.20	
Electors on the lists		93,250		
Source: Thirty-fifth General Election, 1993: Official Voting Results, Published by the Chief Electoral Officer of Canada. Financial figures taken from official contributions and expenses provided by Elections Canada.

1974 Canadian federal election: Waterloo—Cambridge
Party	Candidate	Votes	%	±%
New Democratic	Max Saltsman	25,479	41.58	
Liberal	Brian Goff	18,034	29.43	
Progressive Conservative	Glenn Carroll	17,394	28.38	
Social Credit	John H. Long	253	0.41	
Marxist–Leninist	Richard E. Rathwell	122	0.20	
Total valid votes		61,282	100.00	
Total rejected ballots		184		
Turnout		61,466	75.65	
Electors on the lists		81,248		
lop.parl.ca

Provincial

1977 Ontario general election: Cambridge
Party	Candidate	Votes	%	Expenditures
New Democratic	Monty Davidson	11,120	37.31	$12,972
Progressive Conservative	Bill Barlow	10,566	35.45	$25,056
Liberal	Claudette Millar	7,870	26.40	$22,087
Independent Social Credit	John H. Long	252	0.85	$768
Total valid votes		29,808	100.00	
Total rejected, unmarked and declined ballots		153		
Turnout		29,961	65.02	
Electors on the lists		46,081		
