= Paul Vachon =

Canadian professional wrestler (1937–2024)

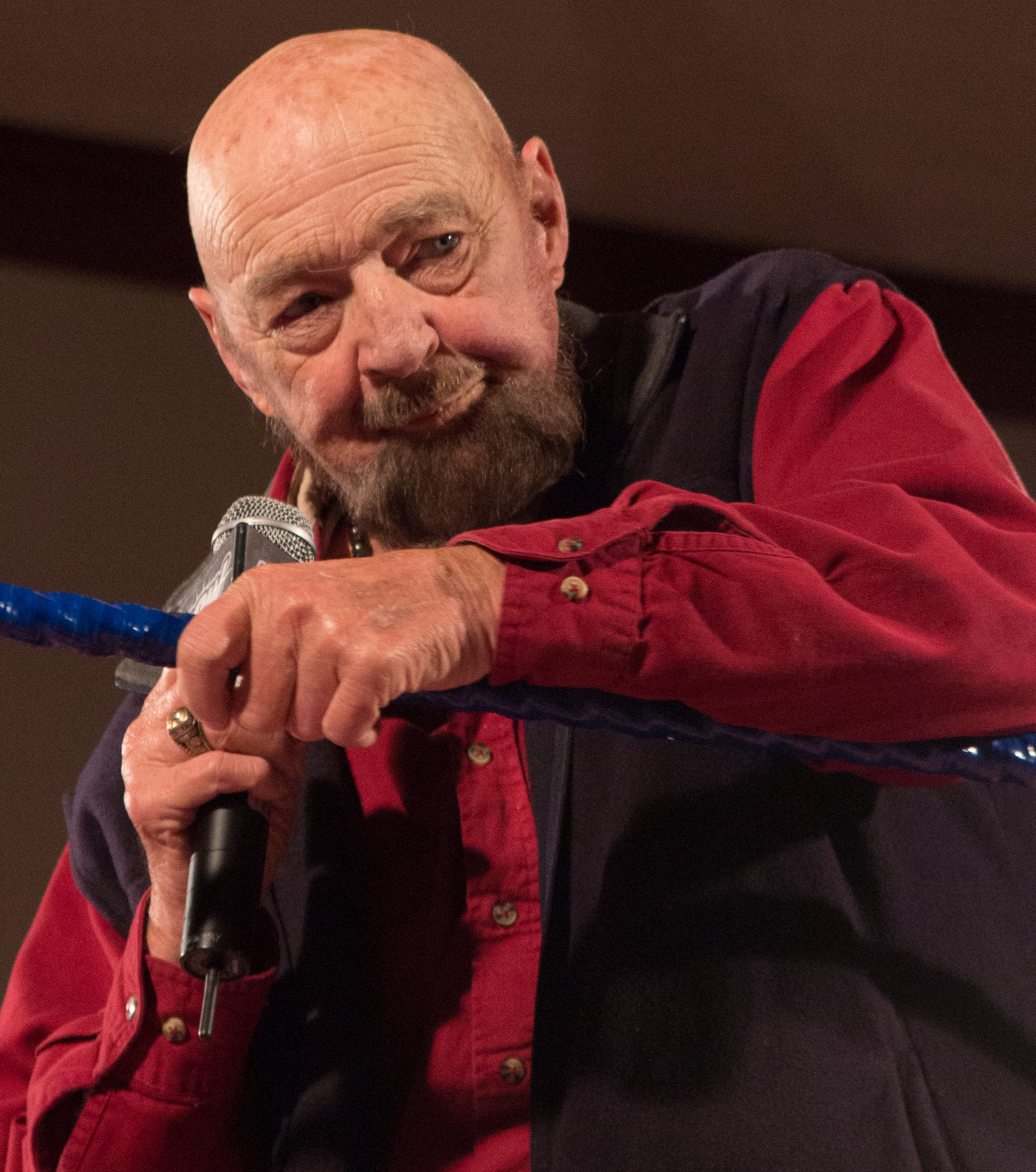
- Vachon in 2013

Personal information
- Born: October 7, 1937 Montreal, Quebec, Canada
- Died: February 29, 2024 (aged 86) Mansonville, Quebec, Canada
- Spouse: Rebecca Pierce (m. 1966)
- Children: 6
- Family: Vachon

Professional wrestling career
- Ring name(s): Nikita Zolotoff; Paul "Butcher" Vachon
- Billed height: 6 ft 2 in (1.88 m)
- Billed weight: 280 lb (130 kg; 20 st)
- Billed from: Montreal, Quebec, Canada
- Debut: 1955
- Retired: October 1987

Paul Vachon (October 7, 1937 – February 29, 2024) was a Canadian professional wrestler. He was a member of the Vachon wrestling family. He is perhaps best known by his ring name Butcher Vachon.

== Professional wrestling career ==
Paul Vachon grew up as one of thirteen children of Ferdinand Vachon, a Montreal police officer. In 1955, he followed his brother Maurice into professional business, adopting his brother's, the "Mad Dog", vicious heel style and the moniker "Butcher Vachon". He wrestled in the American Wrestling Association, World Wrestling Federation (now WWE), National Wrestling Alliance and Georgia Championship Wrestling (later would become WCW).

Vachon often teamed with his brother "Mad Dog" Vachon, with whom he won the AWA World Tag Team Championship.

In the early 1970s he appeared alongside his sister Vivian Vachon in the motion picture Wrestling Queen.

Vachon wrestled under a mask as "Spoiler #2" for Jim Crockett Promotions' "Mid-Atlantic Championship Wrestling" in 1975. His angle involved getting revenge on Wahoo McDaniel, Paul Jones, and Rufus R. Jones for running Super Destroyer (Don Jardine) out of the territory. (In fact, Jardine left JCP on short notice and booker George Scott wanted a masked heel on the roster.) Vachon stayed in JCP for a few months and before leaving lost a series of matches against Paul Jones and Rufus Jones in which the mask was at stake (as was Paul Jones' U.S. title in their matches).

Vachon retired in 1985 after two years of being a jobber to the stars in the WWF. Proving his talents extend beyond the wrestling ring, one of his final appearances was singing "La Vie en Rose" on Tuesday Night Titans.

In October 1987, he wrestled two final matches for International World Class Championship Wrestling in Maine losing to The Iron Sheik and teaming with the Mad Russian, losing to King Kaluha and Tom Brandi.

== Personal life ==
Paul Vachon was the adoptive father of wrestler Luna Vachon. He is the brother of wrestlers Maurice and Vivian Vachon and former father-in-law of wrestlers David "Gangrel" Heath and Tom Nash. In total, Vachon has six children and has been married four times.

After his wrestling career, Paul Vachon joined the NDP and ran as a federal candidate in 1988, 1993 and 1995.

In 1993, he was diagnosed with colon cancer and had half of his colon removed. Then, in 2003, he was diagnosed with throat cancer. Vachon underwent 40 treatments, one on each weekday for five straight weeks, to overcome the throat cancer. In addition, he had the disease burned out of his tonsils and his teeth were removed. As a result of the radiation treatments, he underwent reconstructive jaw surgery in early June 2009. Vachon also suffered from diabetes.

Vachon and his wife Rebecca traveled to flea markets and fairs to sell therapeutic magnets, a business they began in 1995. He also self-published an autobiography titled When Wrestling Was Real.

Vachon died at his home in Mansonville, Quebec, on February 29, 2024, at the age of 86.

== Championships and accomplishments ==
- 50th State Big Time Wrestling

- NWA Hawaii Tag Team Championship (1 time) - with Hard Boiled Haggerty

- American Wrestling Association

- AWA Midwest Tag Team Championship (1 time) - with Maurice Vachon
- AWA World Tag Team Championship (1 time) - with Maurice Vachon

- Canadian Pro-Wrestling Hall of Fame
  - Class of 2025 - as a member of The Vachon‘s
- Cauliflower Alley Club

- Men's Wrestling Award (2008)

- Eastern Townships Wrestling Association

- ETWA Heavyweight Championship (1 time)

- George Tragos/Lou Thesz Professional Wrestling Hall of Fame
  - Class of 2010
- Mid-Atlantic Championship Wrestling

- NWA Southern Tag Team Championship (Mid-Atlantic version) (1 time) - with Maurice Vachon

- Mid-South Sports

- NWA Georgia Tag Team Championship (1 time) - with Stan Vachon
- NWA Southern Tag Team Championship (Georgia version) (5 times) - with Louie Tillet (2) and Stan Vachon (3)
- NWA World Tag Team Championship (Georgia version) (1 time) - with Maurice Vachon

- Nebraska Pro Wrestling Hall of Fame
  - Class of 2023
- NWA Hollywood Wrestling

- NWA Americas Tag Team Championship (1 time) - with Chavo Guerrero Sr.

- Professional Wrestling Hall of Fame and Museum
  - (Class of 2004) - with Maurice Vachon
- Southwest Sports, Inc.

- NWA Texas Tag Team Championship (2 times) - with Maurice Vachon (1) and Ivan the Terrible (1)

- Stampede Wrestling

- NWA Canadian Tag Team Championship (Calgary version) (3 times) - with Maurice Vachon
- NWA International Tag Team Championship (Calgary version) (3 times) - with Maurice Vachon

== Electoral record (incomplete) ==
Canadian federal by-election, February 13, 1995: Brome—Missisquoi
Party	Candidate	Votes	%	±%	Expenditures
Liberal	Denis Paradis	19,078	51.02	+14.36	$54,562
Bloc Québécois	Jean-François Bertrand	15,764	42.16	+1.40	$53,734
Progressive Conservative	Guy Lever	1,235	3.30	−13.85	$36,225a
Reform	Line Maheux	517	1.38		$21,755
New Democratic Party	Paul Vachon	371	0.99	−0.27	$9,325
Christian Heritage	Jean Blaquière	126	0.34		$2,321
Non-Affiliated	Yvon V. Boulanger	107	0.29		$3,816
Green	Éric Ferland	101	0.27		$412
Natural Law	Michel Champagne	77	0.21	−1.08	$6,538
Abolitionist	John H. Long	15	0.04	−1.61	$1,219
Total valid votes		37,391	100.00		
Total rejected ballots		288			
Turnout		37,679	64.32	−12.32	
Electors on the lists		58,579			
a- Does not include unpaid claims.
