= Connie Cody =

Canadian politician

Connie Cody MP

Member of Parliament for Cambridge
- Incumbent
- Assumed office April 28, 2025
- Preceded by: Bryan May

Personal details
- Born: Galt, Ontario
- Party: Conservative

Connie Cody MP is a Canadian politician from the Conservative Party of Canada. She was elected Member of Parliament for Cambridge in the 2025 Canadian federal election.

== Early life ==
Cody was born and raised in Galt.

== Career ==
In 2020, Cody was a candidate in a council by-election.

== Personal life ==
Cody is a mother and grandmother.

== Electoral record ==
2025 Canadian federal election: Cambridge
Party	Candidate	Votes	%	±%	Expenditures
Conservative	Connie Cody	31,766	48.6	+14.44	
Liberal	Bryan May	30,309	46.3	+8.08	
New Democratic	José de Lima	2,183	3.3	–13.76	
Green	Lux Burgess	1,052	1.6	–1.78	
Marxist–Leninist	Manuel Couto	109	0.2	N/A	
Total valid votes/expense limit		65,419	99.3	-0.1	
Total rejected ballots		438	0.7	+0.1	
Turnout		65,857	70.4	+9.1	
Eligible voters		93,618			
Conservative gain from Liberal		Swing		+3.18	
Source: Elections Canada

2021 Canadian federal election: Cambridge
Party	Candidate	Votes	%	±%	Expenditures
Liberal	Bryan May	20,866	38.0	-1.5	$81,180.89
Conservative	Connie Cody	18,876	34.4	+4.4	$48,138.99
New Democratic	Lorne Bruce	9,319	17.0	-2.3	$12,300.84
People's	Maggie Segounis	3,931	7.2	+4.0	$3,523.25
Green	Michele Braniff	1,860	3.4	-4.1	$2,040.04
Total valid votes/expense limit		54,852	99.4	-0.06	$118,345.46
Total rejected ballots		335	0.6		
Turnout		55,187	61.3		
Eligible voters		90,092			
Liberal hold		Swing		-3.0	
Source: Elections Canada
