= Denis Paradis =

Canadian politician (born 1949)

The Honourable Denis Paradis PC
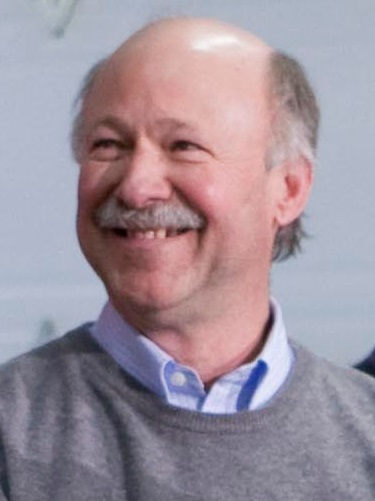
- Paradis in 2011

Member of the Canadian Parliament for Brome—Missisquoi
- In office 19 October 2015 – 21 October 2019
- Preceded by: Pierre Jacob
- Succeeded by: Lyne Bessette
- In office 13 February 1995 – 23 January 2006
- Preceded by: Gaston Péloquin
- Succeeded by: Christian Ouellet

Chairman of the Standing Committee on Official Languages
- In office 17 February 2016 – 11 September 2019
- Preceded by: Michael Chong
- Succeeded by: Emmanuel Dubourg

Minister of State for Financial Institutions
- In office 12 December 2003 – 19 June 2004
- Preceded by: Office established
- Succeeded by: Office discontinued

Secretary of State for Latin America and Africa
- In office 15 January 2002 – 11 December 2003
- Preceded by: David Kilgour
- Succeeded by: Office discontinued

Secretary of State for La Francophonie
- In office 15 January 2002 – 11 December 2003
- Preceded by: Ron Duhamel
- Succeeded by: Denis Coderre

Parliamentary Secretary to the Minister of Foreign Affairs
- In office 1 September 1999 – 12 September 2001
- Preceded by: Julian Reed
- Succeeded by: Aileen Carroll

Parliamentary Secretary to the Minister for International Cooperation
- In office 26 January 1999 – 31 August 1999
- Preceded by: Claudette Bradshaw
- Succeeded by: Eugène Bellemare

Personal details
- Born: 1 April 1949 (age 77) Saint-Jean-sur-Richelieu, Quebec
- Party: Liberal
- Profession: lawyer

Denis Paradis PC (born 1 April 1949) is a former Canadian politician and lawyer who served as the Member of Parliament (MP) for Brome—Missisquoi from 2015 until 2019 and previously from 1995 to 2006. A member of the Liberal Party of Canada, Paradis was minister of state for financial institutions from 2003 to 2004. He retired from politics in 2019.

His brother, Pierre Paradis, is a member of the National Assembly of Quebec and a provincial cabinet minister. The Paradis brothers are political allies.

== Early life and private career ==
Paradis was born in Saint-Jean-sur-Richelieu, Quebec. He has a Bachelor of Commerce degree (1970) and a Bachelor of Civil Law degree (1975) from the University of Ottawa and was admitted to the Quebec Bar in 1976. In 1985, he co-authored the book Régles de procédure devant les tribunaux administratifs.

After working as a partner in the firm Paradis-Poulin, he became the president of the Quebec Bar Association in 1993. In June 1993, he criticized the overcrowded state of some provincial courthouses. He owns a winery in Saint-Armand, Quebec.

== First political offices (1995–2002) ==
Paradis was first elected to the House of Commons of Canada in a 1995 by-election, called after Gaston Péloquin, the sitting Bloc Québécois member for Brome—Missisquoi, was killed in an automobile accident. Paradis championed the Canadian federalist cause in the campaign and said that his election would confirm Brome-Missisquoi's place within a united Canada. The election was initially considered too close to call, but Paradis won by a significant margin. His victory was seen as helping the federalist cause in the buildup to the 1995 Quebec referendum on sovereignty.

Paradis entered parliament as a backbench supporter of Jean Chrétien's government. In late 1995, he helped launch a Summer Work/Student Exchange project that encouraged students to develop their second-language skills. He was elected chair of the Liberal Party's Quebec caucus in February 1997.

Paradis was returned to a second parliamentary mandate in the 1997 federal election, and in late 1997 he co-chaired a special committee that recommended Quebec's schools be divided on linguistic rather than denominational lines. He was named as parliamentary secretary to the minister for International Cooperation in January 1999, and in September of the same year he was promoted to parliamentary secretary to the minister of Foreign Affairs. He was again returned to parliament in the 2000 federal election.

== Minister (2002–2004) ==
=== Chrétien government ===
Paradis was appointed as Secretary of State for La Francophonie and Secretary of State for Latin America and Africa in Chrétien's government on 15 January 2002. These were ministerial positions but not full cabinet portfolios.

Africa

Shortly after his appointment, Paradis met with Nigerian Information Minister Jerry Gana in an effort to prevent the execution of Safiya Hussaini. He later supported the Commonwealth's decision to suspend Zimbabwe for one year in the aftermath of that country's disputed 2002 presidential election.

Paradis accompanied Chrétien on a 2002 delegation to Africa that included stops in Morocco, Algeria, Nigeria, Senegal, Ethiopia and South Africa. He supported the New Partnership for Africa's Development (NEPAD), and in October 2002 he pledged more than two million dollars to promote security and good governance in francophone Africa.

In March 2003, Paradis announced that Canada would provide one hundred million dollars to Ethiopia, Senegal, Ghana, Mali, Mozambique, and Tanzania under the Canada Fund for Africa. The stated intent of this funding was to recognize improved commitments to human rights and democracy. Later in the same year, Paradis represented Canada at Olusegun Obasanjo's inauguration for a second term as President of Nigeria.

Paradis nominated former United Nations Secretary-General Boutros Boutros-Ghali to be named to the Order of Canada in 2002. Boutros-Ghali received the honour in 2004.

Latin America

Paradis led a Canadian trade delegation to Cuba in November 2002. This visit marked an improvement in relations between the countries, which had been strained for three years due to Canadian concerns about Cuba's human rights practices.

In January 2003, Paradis hosted a diplomatic event called the Ottawa Initiative on Haiti. At this meeting, representatives from Canada, France, the United States of America, and the Organization of American States discussed Haiti's political future. No representatives of the Haitian government were present. A few months later, journalist Michel Vastel leaked information about the meeting that he said was given to him by Paradis. Writing in L'Actualité, Vastel claimed that the delegates decided that Haitian President Jean-Bertrand Aristide should be replaced by a United Nations trusteeship within a year. Paradis has denied Vastel's claim.

The Francophonie

In December 2002, Paradis called for the creation of a watchdog organization to target human rights violations in Francophonie nations.

=== Martin government ===
Paradis was not, during Jean Chrétien's tenure as prime minister, among the group of Liberal parliamentarians (MPs) who supported Paul Martin's leadership ambitions. He nevertheless supported Martin at the 2003 Liberal Party leadership convention, which was held to elect Chrétien's successor. Martin won a landslide victory and became prime minister on 12 December 2003. When he formed his first ministry, he appointed Paradis as minister of state for Financial Institutions.

Paradis led several roundtable discussions with business, academic, and social groups in months that followed, during the buildup to the Martin government's 2004 budget. Shortly before budget day, he said that the government would return to a practice of setting aside four billion dollars per year to cover emergency spending or the possibility of an economic downturn.

== Return to the backbenches and time out of office (2004–2015) ==
Paradis was narrowly re-elected in the 2004 federal election over Bloc challenger Christian Ouellet. He was not re-appointed to the ministry and returned to the government backbenches. He lost his seat to Ouellet in the 2006 election, amid losses for the Liberal Party across Quebec.

Paradis supported Stéphane Dion in the Liberal Party's 2006 leadership election. Dion won an upset victory in this contest, defeating Michael Ignatieff on the fourth ballot. Paradis attempted to reclaim his seat in the 2008 federal election but was narrowly defeated by Ouellet in a rematch from 2006.

Paradis ran for re-election in the 2011 federal election but lost to Pierre Jacob of the New Democratic Party amid a strong provincial swing to the NDP.

== Return to Parliament (2015–2019) ==
Paradis again ran as the Liberal Party's candidate in Brome—Missisquoi during the 2015 federal election, and this time was victorious, beating New Democrat Catherine Lusson. He ran for the office of Speaker of the House of Commons of Canada, losing to fellow Liberal MP Geoff Regan. Subsequently, he was elected to chair the Standing Committee on Official Languages. He did not run for re-election in the 2019 Canadian federal election, instead opting to retire from politics.

== Electoral record ==
2015 Canadian federal election
Party	Candidate	Votes	%	±%	Expenditures
Liberal	Denis Paradis	25,744	43.88	+21.82	–
New Democratic	Catherine Lusson	14,383	24.51	-18.13	–
Bloc Québécois	Patrick Melchior	10,252	17.47	-3.79	–
Conservative	Charles Poulin	6,724	11.46	-0.45	–
Green	Cindy Moynan	1,377	2.35	+0.22	–
Strength in Democracy	Patrick Paine	195	0.33	–	–
Total valid votes/Expense limit		58,675	100.0		$222,301.16
Total rejected ballots		716	–	–	
Turnout		59,391	–	–	
Eligible voters		85,201			
Source: Elections Canada

2011 Canadian federal election
Party	Candidate	Votes	%	±%	Expenditures
New Democratic	Pierre Jacob	22,407	42.64	+33.59	
Liberal	Denis Paradis	11,589	22.06	-10.73	
Bloc Québécois	Christelle Bogosta	11,173	21.26	-13.95	
Conservative	Nolan LeBlanc-Bauerle	6,256	11.91	-6.75	
Green	Benoit Lambert	1,120	2.13	-1.45	
Total valid votes/Expense limit		52,545	100.00		
Total rejected ballots		588	1.05	–	
Turnout		53,133	66.30	–	
Eligible voters		80,137	–	–	

2008 Canadian federal election: Brome—Missisquoi
Party	Candidate	Votes	%	±%	Expenditures
Bloc Québécois	Christian Ouellet	17,561	35.21	−3.12	$75,915
Liberal	Denis Paradis	16,357	32.79	+4.82	$66,462
Conservative	Mark Quinlan	9,309	18.66	−1.69	$78,614
New Democratic	Christelle Bogosta	4,514	9.05	+3.20	$4,678
Green	Pierre Brassard	1,784	3.58	+0.03	$126
Independent	David Marler	354	0.71		$16,915
Total valid votes		49,879	100.00		
Total rejected ballots		531			
Turnout		50,410	65.78	−0.46	
Electors on the lists		76,636			

2006 Canadian federal election: Brome—Missisquoi
Party	Candidate	Votes	%	±%	Expenditures
Bloc Québécois	Christian Ouellet	18,596	38.33	−1.33	$66,782
Liberal	Denis Paradis	13,569	27.97	−14.11	$58,420
Conservative	David Marler	9,874	20.35	+9.30	$69,104
New Democratic	Josianne Jetté	2,839	5.85	+3.19	$2,722
Progressive Canadian	Heward Grafftey	1,921	3.96		$60,081
Green	Michel Champagne	1,721	3.55	−1.00	$2,460
Total valid votes		48,520	100.00		
Total rejected ballots		554			
Turnout		49,074	66.24	+3.61	
Electors on the lists		74,088			
Sources: Official Results, Elections Canada and Financial Returns, Elections Canada.

2004 Canadian federal election: Brome—Missisquoi
Party	Candidate	Votes	%	±%	Expenditures
Liberal	Denis Paradis	18,609	42.08	−7.50	$56,708
Bloc Québécois	Christian Ouellet	17,537	39.66	+7.93	$29,014
Conservative	Peter Stastny	4,888	11.05	−6.50	$14,318
Green	Louise Martineau	2,011	4.55		none listed
New Democratic	Piper Huggins	1,177	2.66		$5
Total valid votes		44,222	100.00		
Total rejected ballots		790			
Turnout		45,012	62.63		
Electors on the lists		71,866			
Percentage change figures are factored for redistribution. Conservative Party percentages are contrasted with the combined Canadian Alliance and Progressive Conservative percentages from 2000.
Sources: Official Results, Elections Canada and Financial Returns, Elections Canada.

2000 Canadian federal election: Brome—Missisquoi
Party	Candidate	Votes	%	±%	Expenditures
Liberal	Denis Paradis	21,545	50.26	+7.89	$60,175
Bloc Québécois	André Leroux	13,363	31.17	+3.34	$57,054
Progressive Conservative	Heward Grafftey	5,502	12.84	−15.25	$58,417
Alliance	Jacques Loyer	1,977	4.61		$387
New Democratic	Jeff Itcush	480	1.12	−0.60	none listed
Total valid votes		42,867	100.00		
Total rejected ballots		986			
Turnout		43,853	65.72	−10.33	
Electors on the lists		66,730			
Sources: Official Results, Elections Canada and Financial Returns, Elections Canada.

1997 Canadian federal election: Brome—Missisquoi
Party	Candidate	Votes	%	±%	Expenditures
Liberal	Denis Paradis	19,261	42.37	–	$54,531
Progressive Conservative	Claude Boulard	12,770	28.09		$29,694
Bloc Québécois	Noël Lacasse	12,652	27.83		$35,640
New Democratic	Nicole Guillemet	781	1.72		$572
Total valid votes		45,464	100.00		
Total rejected ballots		1,346			
Turnout		46,810	76.05		
Electors on the lists		61,553			
Sources: Official Results, Elections Canada and Financial Returns, Elections Canada.

Canadian federal by-election, February 13, 1995: Brome—Missisquoi
Party	Candidate	Votes	%	±%	Expenditures
Liberal	Denis Paradis	19,078	51.02	+14.36	$54,562
Bloc Québécois	Jean-François Bertrand	15,764	42.16	+1.40	$53,734
Progressive Conservative	Guy Lever	1,235	3.30	−13.85	$36,225a
Reform	Line Maheux	517	1.38		$21,755
New Democratic Party	Paul Vachon	371	0.99	−0.27	$9,325
Christian Heritage	Jean Blaquière	126	0.34		$2,321
Non-Affiliated	Yvon V. Boulanger	107	0.29		$3,816
Green	Éric Ferland	101	0.27		$412
Natural Law	Michel Champagne	77	0.21	−1.08	$6,538
Abolitionist	John H. Long	15	0.04	−1.61	$1,219
Total valid votes		37,391	100.00		
Total rejected ballots		288			
Turnout		37,679	64.32	−12.32	
Electors on the lists		58,579			
a- Does not include unpaid claims.
