= Christian Ouellet =

Canadian politician (1934–2021)

Member of the House of Commons of Canada for Brome—Missisquoi
- In office January 23, 2006 – May 2, 2011
- Preceded by: Denis Paradis
- Succeeded by: Pierre Jacob

Personal details
- Born: April 22, 1934 Montreal, Quebec
- Died: December 21, 2021 (aged 87)
- Party: Bloc Québécois
- Spouse: Estelle Côté
- Profession: architect/professor

Christian Ouellet (April 22, 1934 – December 21, 2021) was a Canadian politician from the province of Quebec. He represented Brome—Missisquoi in the House of Commons of Canada from 2006 to 2011 as a member of the Bloc Québécois.

He is not to be confused with another Christian Ouellet, who has worked as an organizer and policy strategist for the Quebec Liberal Party.

== Early life and career ==
Ouellet was born in Montreal on April 22, 1934. An architect by profession, he joined the Ordre des architectes du Québec in 1969 and took a Master's Degree in building from the University of Manchester in England (1972–75). He has promoted ecological housing since 1973 and was a finalist for the Canada Mortgage and Housing Corporation's Healthy Housing Design Competition in 1991.

Ouellet chaired the Solar Energy Society of Canada and the Parti Québécois's national committee on Environment and Sustainable Development. He taught architecture at the Université de Montréal and lectured at the Université du Québec à Montréal.

== Political career ==
Ouellet was active with the Bloc Québécois and its provincial counterpart, the Parti Québécois, before running for office himself. He first sought election to the House of Commons in the 2004 federal election and finished a close second against incumbent Liberal cabinet minister Denis Paradis in Brome—Missisquoi. He challenged Paradis again in the 2006 election and won by over five thousand votes.

During the 2006 election, Ouellet said that he would downplay Quebec sovereigntism if elected and would instead focus on tackling economic issues and opposing corruption. Bloc leader Gilles Duceppe criticized this statement, saying that his party would promote sovereignty as well as defending Quebec's interests in other areas. After talking with Duceppe, Ouellet agreed to support the Bloc's full platform on sovereignty.

Ouellet was re-elected in the 2008 federal election, defeating Paradis by a reduced margin in a rematch from 2006.

In parliament, Ouellet served as the Bloc's critic for social housing and as an associate critic for natural resources and the environment. He has also promoted increased Via Rail access from Montreal to Sherbrooke via Quebec's Estrie. In 2009, he introduced a Private Member's Bill to remove waiting times for Employment Insurance benefits.

Ouellet was one of eight Canadian parliamentarians to meet with Chen Shui-bian, the president of Taiwan, in 2006.

On February 24, 2011, the Bloc announced that Ouellet would not be a candidate in the next federal election.

== Personal life and death ==
Ouellet died on December 21, 2021, at the age of 87.

== Electoral record ==
2008 Canadian federal election: Brome—Missisquoi
Party	Candidate	Votes	%	±%	Expenditures
Bloc Québécois	Christian Ouellet	17,561	35.21	−3.12	$75,915
Liberal	Denis Paradis	16,357	32.79	+4.82	$66,462
Conservative	Mark Quinlan	9,309	18.66	−1.69	$78,614
New Democratic	Christelle Bogosta	4,514	9.05	+3.20	$4,678
Green	Pierre Brassard	1,784	3.58	+0.03	$126
Independent	David Marler	354	0.71		$16,915
Total valid votes		49,879	100.00		
Total rejected ballots		531			
Turnout		50,410	65.78	−0.46	
Electors on the lists		76,636			

2006 Canadian federal election: Brome—Missisquoi
Party	Candidate	Votes	%	±%	Expenditures
Bloc Québécois	Christian Ouellet	18,596	38.33	−1.33	$66,782
Liberal	Denis Paradis	13,569	27.97	−14.11	$58,420
Conservative	David Marler	9,874	20.35	+9.30	$69,104
New Democratic	Josianne Jetté	2,839	5.85	+3.19	$2,722
Progressive Canadian	Heward Grafftey	1,921	3.96		$60,081
Green	Michel Champagne	1,721	3.55	−1.00	$2,460
Total valid votes		48,520	100.00		
Total rejected ballots		554			
Turnout		49,074	66.24	+3.61	
Electors on the lists		74,088			
Sources: Official Results, Elections Canada and Financial Returns, Elections Canada.

2004 Canadian federal election: Brome—Missisquoi
Party	Candidate	Votes	%	±%	Expenditures
Liberal	Denis Paradis	18,609	42.08	−7.50	$56,708
Bloc Québécois	Christian Ouellet	17,537	39.66	+7.93	$29,014
Conservative	Peter Stastny	4,888	11.05	−6.50	$14,318
Green	Louise Martineau	2,011	4.55		none listed
New Democratic	Piper Huggins	1,177	2.66		$5
Total valid votes		44,222	100.00		
Total rejected ballots		790			
Turnout		45,012	62.63		
Electors on the lists		71,866			
Percentage change figures are factored for redistribution. Conservative Party percentages are contrasted with the combined Canadian Alliance and Progressive Conservative percentages from 2000.
Sources: Official Results, Elections Canada and Financial Returns, Elections Canada.
