= Éric Ferland =

Canadian politician

Frelighsburg City Councilor, Ward Two
- In office 2005–2009
- In office 1998–2002

Leader of the Green Party of Quebec
- In office 1994–1996
- Preceded by: Marian Lé Grant
- Succeeded by: Saloua Laridhi

Personal details
- Party: New Democratic Party (2019–)
- Other political affiliations: Green Party of Quebec; Green Party of Canada

Éric Ferland is a politician and organizer in the Canadian province of Quebec. He was the leader of the Green Party of Quebec from 1994 to 1996 and has sought election to the House of Commons of Canada. He is also a prominent organizer of the Projet Ecosphere event in southeastern Quebec. Since 2012, the most important environmental fair is being held in Montreal and the first Quebec City edition was held in May 2016.

== Political career ==
Ferland became the leader of the Green Party of Quebec in 1994, following that year's provincial election. The party was in a weakened state in this period, after former leader Jean Ouimet and several top organizers left to join the Parti Québécois. Ferland held the party leadership for two years before standing down. He did not seek election to the National Assembly of Quebec in this period, although he ran as a Green Party of Canada candidate in a 1995 by-election in Brome—Missisquoi.

Ferland later served as a town councillor in Frelighsburg, Quebec on at least three occasions. He stood down from council in 2002, but was returned in 2005 and served another term. He did not run for re-election in 2009.

In 2019, he joined New Democratic Party to run against former NDP member Pierre Nantel who defected to Greens.

== Organizer ==
In 2006, Ferland was a prominent organizer of the first Projet Ecosphere, an autumn environmental fair in Brome devoted to environment and sustainability. One hundred and thirty exhibitors were featured. The second fair, held the following year, featured 170 exhibits and was attended by over seven thousand people.

== Electoral record ==
=== Federal ===
2019 Canadian federal election: Longueuil—Saint-Hubert
Party	Candidate	Votes	%	±%	Expenditures
Bloc Québécois	Denis Trudel	23,061	38.5	+11.23	$46,039.85
Liberal	Réjean Hébert	20,471	34.2	+4.19	$77,307.46
Green	Pierre Nantel	6,745	11.3	+8.81	$16,474.78
New Democratic	Éric Ferland	5,104	8.5	–22.72	$11,119.46
Conservative	Patrick Clune	3,779	6.3	–2.44	none listed
People's	Ellen Comeau	467	0.8	–	$0.00
Independent	Pierre-Luc Fillon	217	0.4	–	$0.00
Total valid votes/expense limit		59,844	100.0		
Total rejected ballots		1,086			
Turnout		60,930	69.9		
Eligible voters		87,113			
Bloc Québécois gain from Independent		Swing		–	
Source: Elections Canada
Note: Pierre Nantel was the incumbent MP who was elected in 2015 as a New Democrat, but sat as an independent after August 16, 2019. Nantel decided to run again as the Green candidate in the 2019 election, but never joined the Green caucus while the 42nd Parliament was in session.

Canadian federal by-election, February 13, 1995: Brome—Missisquoi
Party	Candidate	Votes	%	±%	Expenditures
Liberal	Denis Paradis	19,078	51.02	+14.36	$54,562
Bloc Québécois	Jean-François Bertrand	15,764	42.16	+1.40	$53,734
Progressive Conservative	Guy Lever	1,235	3.30	−13.85	$36,225a
Reform	Line Maheux	517	1.38		$21,755
New Democratic Party	Paul Vachon	371	0.99	−0.27	$9,325
Christian Heritage	Jean Blaquière	126	0.34		$2,321
Non-Affiliated	Yvon V. Boulanger	107	0.29		$3,816
Green	Éric Ferland	101	0.27		$412
Natural Law	Michel Champagne	77	0.21	−1.08	$6,538
Abolitionist	John H. Long	15	0.04	−1.61	$1,219
Total valid votes		37,391	100.00		
Total rejected ballots		288			
Turnout		37,679	64.32	−12.32	
Electors on the lists		58,579			
a- Does not include unpaid claims.

=== Municipal (incomplete) ===
2005 Frelighsburg municipal election: Councillor, Ward Two
Candidate	Votes	%
Éric Ferland	acclaimed	.

Source for 2005 municipal elections: Official results from the Government of Quebec
