= Jean-François Bertrand =

Canadian politician

Jean-François Bertrand is a former Canadian politician in Quebec, Canada. Bertrand served in the National Assembly of Quebec.

== Background ==
He was born on June 22, 1946, in Cowansville, Quebec, and has a degree in political science from Université Laval. He is the son of politicians Jean-Jacques and Gabrielle Bertrand.

== Political career ==
=== Member of the legislature ===
Bertrand became an executive member of the Parti Québécois in 1974 and was elected to the National Assembly of Quebec in the 1976 election. He served as parliamentary assistant and Deputy House Leader from 1978 to the 1981 election.

He was re-elected in 1981 and was appointed to Premier René Lévesque's Cabinet. He served as Minister of Communications, until his defeat in the 1985 election. He also was the government's House Leader from 1982 to 1984.

=== Mayoral election ===
Bertrand was the Progrès Civique de Québec candidate for mayor in Quebec City in 1989. He lost against Rassemblement Populaire candidate Jean-Paul L'Allier.

=== Federal politics ===
Bertrand ran as a Bloc Québécois candidate in a 1995 by-election in the federal district of Brome—Missisquoi. He lost against Liberal candidate Denis Paradis.

== Retirement ==
He authored and published Je suis un bum de bonne famille in 2003.

== Electoral record ==
Federal

Canadian federal by-election, February 13, 1995: Brome—Missisquoi
Party	Candidate	Votes	%	±%	Expenditures
Liberal	Denis Paradis	19,078	51.02	+14.36	$54,562
Bloc Québécois	Jean-François Bertrand	15,764	42.16	+1.40	$53,734
Progressive Conservative	Guy Lever	1,235	3.30	−13.85	$36,225a
Reform	Line Maheux	517	1.38		$21,755
New Democratic Party	Paul Vachon	371	0.99	−0.27	$9,325
Christian Heritage	Jean Blaquière	126	0.34		$2,321
Non-Affiliated	Yvon V. Boulanger	107	0.29		$3,816
Green	Éric Ferland	101	0.27		$412
Natural Law	Michel Champagne	77	0.21	−1.08	$6,538
Abolitionist	John H. Long	15	0.04	−1.61	$1,219
Total valid votes		37,391	100.00		
Total rejected ballots		288			
Turnout		37,679	64.32	−12.32	
Electors on the lists		58,579			
a- Does not include unpaid claims.

== Footnotes ==
National Assembly of Quebec
Preceded by Fernand Dufour (Liberal)	MNA, District of Vanier; 1976–1985	Succeeded by Jean-Guy Lemieux (Liberal)
