= Line Maheux =

Line Maheux is a Canadian communications consultant and political strategist. At different times, she has worked for Preston Manning, Stockwell Day, Mike Harris, John Nunziata, and Stephen Harper.

== Reform Party ==
Maheux was hired as the Reform Party of Canada's first Quebec organizer in July 1994, after the party ended its practice of not running candidates in the province. Newspaper reports from the period describe her as a 32-year-old bilingual single mother. A former sales representative, she left university to take the position.

Maheux was the Reform Party's first nominated candidate in Quebec, for a by-election in Brome—Missisquoi held on February 13, 1995. She acknowledged that she had little chance of winning and said that she was trying to counter a perception that the Reform Party was sexist, racist, and anti-French. She received less than two per cent of the vote, finishing fourth against Liberal Party candidate Denis Paradis. After the election, she was hired as an advisor to party leader Preston Manning on Quebec issues.

She was a spokesperson for Reform in the 1997 federal election, when the party ran advertisements that were widely regarded as anti-Quebec. After the election, Maheux became Manning's top adviser on national unity issues.

== Ontario Progressive Conservative Party ==
In April 1998, Maheux became communications director for the office of Progressive Conservative Premier of Ontario Mike Harris. In accepting the position, she cited parallels between the Reform Party and Harris's right-wing government in opposing employment equity and distinct status for Quebec. In the same period, Maheux supported efforts to unite the federal Reform Party with the more moderate Progressive Conservative Party of Canada.

Because of Maheux's Reform Party connections, some of the more moderate figures in Harris's provincial party opposed her appointment. She was replaced by Guy Giorno in June 1999, amid reports that she never entirely fit in with Harris's other advisers.

== Canadian Alliance and Conservative Party ==
Maheux later joined the Canadian Alliance, a successor party to Reform, and worked as a strategist and communications director for Stockwell Day in that party's first leadership election in 2000. Day won the party leadership, and Maheux was hired as Day's media spokesperson. She left after the 2000 federal election, but returned on a temporary basis in mid-2001 when Day faced a challenge to his leadership.

In 2003, the Canadian Alliance merged with the federal Progressive Conservative Party to form the Conservative Party of Canada. Maheux joined the new party and worked for Stephen Harper in its 2004 leadership election. During this period, she said that Harper was more skilled at communicating his message than Stockwell Day had been.

She was a spokesperson for Harper in the 2004 federal election and ran communications sessions for party candidates. Maheux has been described as a personal friend of Harper and, since 2004, she has assisted him in preparing for political debates.

== Other ==
Maheux was the communications director in John Nunziata's unsuccessful campaign to become mayor of Toronto in the 2003 municipal election.

She works as a communications consultant outside of political life. In 2007, she was hired by Bell Canada as its director of government relations.

== Electoral record ==
Canadian federal by-election, February 13, 1995: Brome—Missisquoi
Party	Candidate	Votes	%	±%	Expenditures
Liberal	Denis Paradis	19,078	51.02	+14.36	$54,562
Bloc Québécois	Jean-François Bertrand	15,764	42.16	+1.40	$53,734
Progressive Conservative	Guy Lever	1,235	3.30	−13.85	$36,225a
Reform	Line Maheux	517	1.38		$21,755
New Democratic Party	Paul Vachon	371	0.99	−0.27	$9,325
Christian Heritage	Jean Blaquière	126	0.34		$2,321
Non-Affiliated	Yvon V. Boulanger	107	0.29		$3,816
Green	Éric Ferland	101	0.27		$412
Natural Law	Michel Champagne	77	0.21	−1.08	$6,538
Abolitionist	John H. Long	15	0.04	−1.61	$1,219
Total valid votes		37,391	100.00		
Total rejected ballots		288			
Turnout		37,679	64.32	−12.32	
Electors on the lists		58,579			
a- Does not include unpaid claims.
