= Cordiant Capital =

Sector-focused investor in infrastructure private equity and private debt

Cordiant Capital Inc.
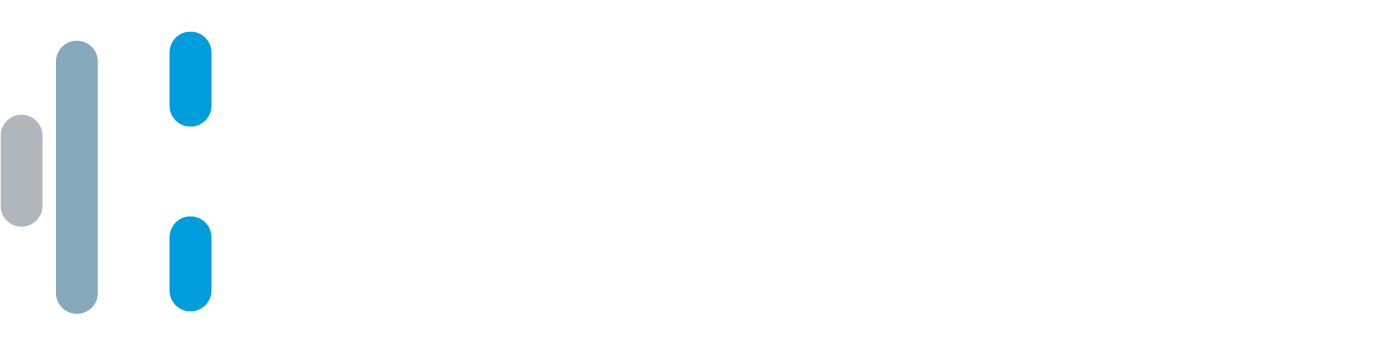
- Type: Private
- Industry: Financial management, private equity
- Founded: 1999; 27 years ago in Montreal, Quebec, Canada
- Headquarters: Montreal, Canada
- Number of locations: Montreal, London, Luxembourg, São Paulo
- Key people: Jean-François Sauvé (co-CEO); Benn Mikula (co-CEO); James Keirnan (chairman)
- Products: Infrastructure private debt and private equity
- AUM: US$3.4 billion (2022)
- Website: www.cordiantcap.com

Cordiant Capital is a Canadian multinational investment management firm based in Montreal, Quebec. Founded in 1999, the firm also has offices in London, São Paulo and Luxembourg. Since 2015, the firm's various investment funds have focused on energy infrastructure, digital infrastructure, and agriculture.

== History ==
=== 1999–2014 ===
Cordiant Capital was founded as a fund manager in Montreal in 1999. With an initial investing focus on emerging market debt, Cordiant's first fund closed in 2001 with US$360 million raised from its sole two investors at the time: Ontario Teachers' Pension Plan and Caisse de dépôt et placement du Québec. Cordiant was an early signatory to the United Nations' Principles for Responsible Investment.

In 2005, the Government of Canada created its $211 million Canadian Investment Fund for Africa, with Actis and Cordiant as co-managers. ln December 2009, Cordiant was selected to manage the €500 million Infrastructure Crisis Facility-Debt Pool, part of a $4 billion program launched by the World Bank. Investors in the fund included various European governments and state development agencies. Among them was the Government of Germany, through the development bank KfW.

By 2011, Cordiant had invested around US$2 billion of the $2.2 billion it managed, and had partnered with institutions such as the European Bank for Reconstruction and Development on diverse project types. In April 2013, Cordiant raised $250 million for its fourth emerging market debt fund.

=== Since 2015 ===
In 2015 and 2016, Cordiant was purchased from majority shareholder Ontario Teachers' Pension Plan by a new consortium of partners, including Benn Mikula and Jean-François Sauvé, who became co-CEOs and managing partners. James Keirnan was named Cordiant's new chair.

Upon the change in ownership, Cordiant focused on four sectors: digital infrastructure, agriculture, renewable energy and transport. The company stated it would focus increasingly on middle-market companies, both in emerging and developed markets. Cordiant Capital was one of three Canadian signatories of the Operating Principles for Impact Management investing standard. By January 2020, Cordiant had brought in Steven Marshall, former president of American Tower, as its chairman of telecommunications, overseeing a new $350 million Cordiant fund (Cordiant IX) focused on telecoms infrastructure.

Cordiant listed a new fund, Cordiant Digital Infrastructure, on the London Stock Exchange in February 2021. It was given a £370 million funding cap with plans to invest in telecom infrastructure: data centers, primarily mobile-phone towers and fiber-optic networks. The traded fund's investors were described by The Globe & Mail as "pension plans, alternative asset managers and wealthy families from Australia, Canada, Switzerland, the U.S. and the U.K." The fund's first deal was with the Czech Republic–based digital infrastructure company CRA.

In early 2022, Cordiant Capital had approximately $3 billion in committed capital in its combined funds.

== See also ==
- List of companies of Canada
- List of private-equity firms
- MV Karadeniz Powership Zeynep Sultan
