= Bryan May =

Canadian politician (born 1974)

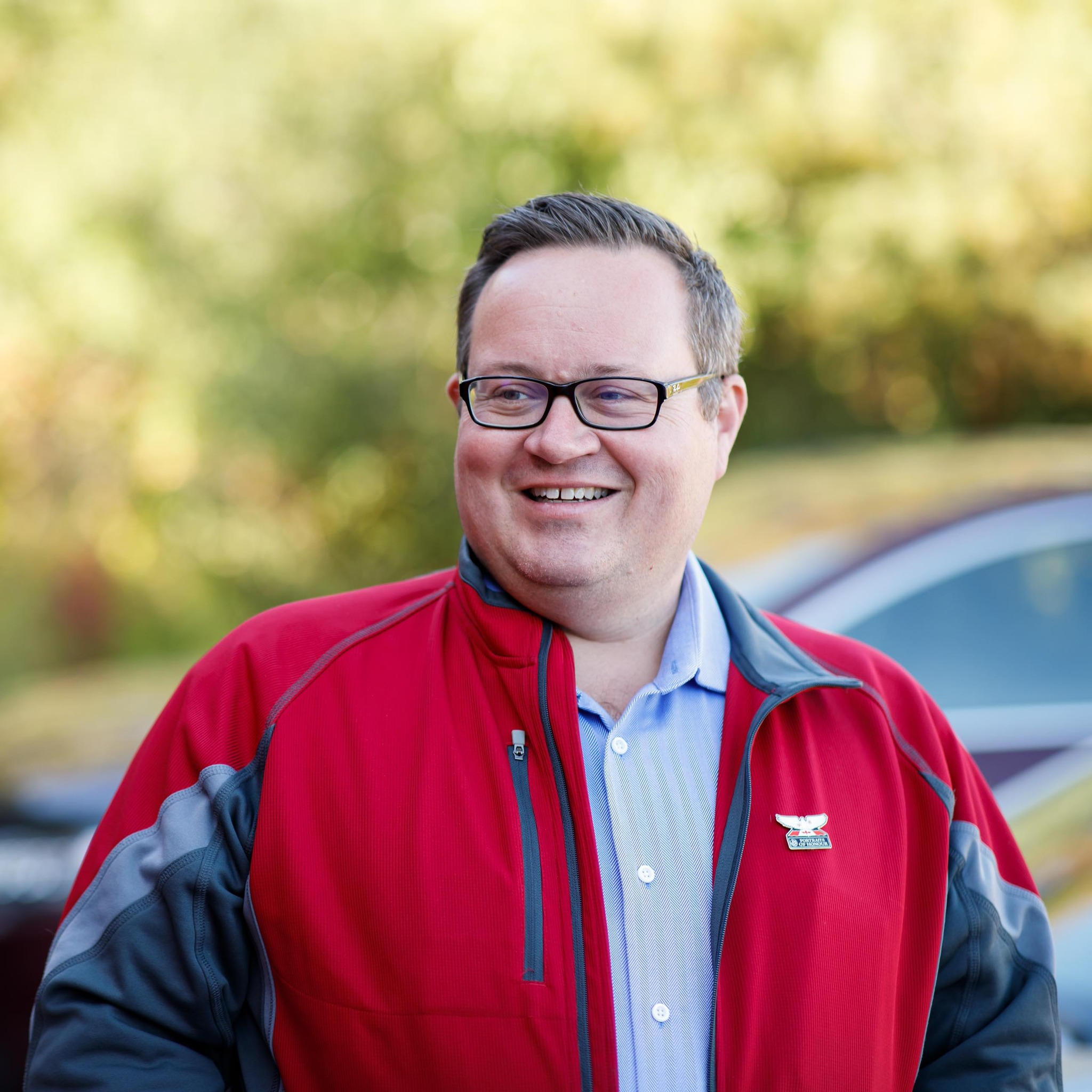
- May in 2023

Parliamentary Secretary to the Minister of National Defence
- In office December 3, 2021 – March 23, 2025
- Preceded by: Anita Vandenbeld

Member of Parliament for Cambridge
- In office October 19, 2015 – March 23, 2025
- Preceded by: Gary Goodyear
- Succeeded by: Connie Cody

Personal details
- Born: September 19, 1974 (age 52) Guelph, Ontario, Canada
- Party: Liberal
- Spouse: Kristin
- Education: University of Waterloo
- Profession: Non-profit management

Bryan J. May (born September 19, 1974) is a Canadian politician who was elected in the 2015 and 2019 Canadian federal elections to represent the electoral district of Cambridge as a Member of Parliament in the House of Commons of Canada. He is a part of the Liberal Party.

May first stood for the Liberal Party in the 2011 federal election, where he finished third. May was acclaimed as the Liberal Party's candidate in Cambridge for the 2015 federal election in May 2015.

On December 3, 2021, Prime Minister Justin Trudeau announced May's appointment as Parliamentary secretary to the Minister of National Defence, Anita Anand.

In the 2025 Canadian federal election, he was unseated by Connie Cody.

== 42nd Parliament of Canada ==
During the 42nd Canadian Parliament May spoke in the House of Commons for the first time on December 11, 2015 to mark the death of a high-profile constituent. He has since spoken several times on various topics. On January 25, 2016, May introduced his first Private Member's Bill, Bill C-240. Bill C-240 is an act to amend the Income Tax Act to introduce a non-refundable tax credit for individuals who take first aid, CPR, and AED training. The bill was opposed by the Liberal government during second reading largely due to stated concerns about its fairness and effectiveness, added tax code complexity, and fiscal responsibility. After being referred to the standing committee on finance it was not proceeded with.

== 43rd Parliament of Canada ==
During the 43rd Canadian Parliament, May served as the chair of the Standing Committee on Veterans Affairs (ACVA), chair of the Subcommittee on Agenda and Procedure of the Standing Committee on Veterans Affairs, and a member of Liaison Committee.

In 2021, May introduced one private member bill, Bill C-272 An Act to Amend the Copyright Act (diagnosis, maintenance or repair) which sought to legalize the circumvention of a digital rights management program if the circumvention is solely for the purpose of diagnosis, maintenance, or repair of a product. The bill was brought to a vote and advanced to committee stage on June 2, 2021 with all party support. However, the bill died in committee when the 43rd Parliament ended in August.

== Electoral record ==
2025 Canadian federal election: Cambridge
Party	Candidate	Votes	%	±%	Expenditures
Conservative	Connie Cody	31,766	48.56	+14.44	$122,850.10
Liberal	Bryan May	30,309	46.33	+8.08	$108,936.58
New Democratic	José de Lima	2,183	3.34	–13.76	$25,033.01
Green	Lux Burgess	1,052	1.61	–1.78	$3,952.84
Marxist–Leninist	Manuel Couto	109	0.17	N/A	$0.00
Total valid votes/expense limit		65,419	99.35	–	$139,195.13
Total rejected ballots		438	0.65		
Turnout		65,857	70.35		
Eligible voters		93,618			
Conservative notional gain from Liberal		Swing		+3.18	
Source: Elections Canada

2021 Canadian federal election: Cambridge
Party	Candidate	Votes	%	±%	Expenditures
Liberal	Bryan May	20,866	38.0	-1.5	$81,180.89
Conservative	Connie Cody	18,876	34.4	+4.4	$48,138.99
New Democratic	Lorne Bruce	9,319	17.0	-2.3	$12,300.84
People's	Maggie Segounis	3,931	7.2	+4.0	$3,523.25
Green	Michele Braniff	1,860	3.4	-4.1	$2,040.04
Total valid votes/expense limit		54,852	99.4	-0.06	$118,345.46
Total rejected ballots		335	0.6		
Turnout		55,187	61.3		
Eligible voters		90,092			
Liberal hold		Swing		-3.0	
Source: Elections Canada

2019 Canadian federal election: Cambridge
Party	Candidate	Votes	%	±%	Expenditures
Liberal	Bryan May	22,903	39.53	-3.64	$79,674.15
Conservative	Sunny Attwal	17,409	30.04	-8.6	none listed
New Democratic	Scott Hamilton	11,177	19.29	+5.42	$23,049.68
Green	Michele Braniff	4,343	7.5	+4.27	$7,369.06
People's	David Haskell	1,872	3.23	–	$7,178.82
Veterans Coalition	George McMorrow	162	0.28	–	$0.00
Marxist–Leninist	Manuel Couto	76	0.13	-0.07	$0.00
Total valid votes/expense limit		57,942	100.0		
Total rejected ballots		385			
Turnout		58,327	64.9		
Eligible voters		89,914			
Liberal hold		Swing		+2.48	
Source: Elections Canada

2015 Canadian federal election: Cambridge
Party	Candidate	Votes	%	±%	Expenditures
Liberal	Bryan May	23,024	43.17	+27.72	$57,941.86
Conservative	Gary Goodyear	20,613	38.65	-14.10	$73,286.38
New Democratic	Bobbi Stewart	7,397	13.87	-14.04	$10,151.06
Green	Michele Braniff	1,723	3.23	-0.37	$1,074.94
Independent	Lee Sperduti	474	0.89	–	$9,550.00
Marxist–Leninist	Manuel Couto	108	0.20		–
Total valid votes/expense limit		53,339	100.00		$219,622.08
Total rejected ballots		227	0.42	–	
Turnout		53,566	64.60	–	
Eligible voters		82,916			
Liberal gain from Conservative		Swing		+20.91	
Source: Elections Canada

2011 Canadian federal election: Cambridge
Party	Candidate	Votes	%	±%	Expenditures
Conservative	Gary Goodyear	29,394	53.40	+4.78	$86,966.51
New Democratic	Susan Galvao	15,238	27.68	+8.07	$13,379.43
Liberal	Bryan May	8,285	15.05	-8.34	$26,622.63
Green	Jacques Malette	1,978	3.59	-4.76	$440.18
Marxist–Leninist	Manuel Couto	153	0.28	–	none listed
Total valid votes/expense limit		55,048	100.00	$96,491.18	
Total rejected ballots		255	0.46	+0.04	
Turnout		55,303	59.25	+3.33	
Eligible voters		93,335	–	–	
