= Cambridge (federal electoral district) =

Federal electoral district in Ontario, Canada

Coordinates: 43.348°N 80.335°W

Ontario electoral district
- Interactive map of riding boundaries from the 2025 federal election

Federal electoral district
- Legislature: House of Commons
MP
Connie Cody
Conservative
- District created: 1976
- First contested: 1979
- Last contested: 2025
- District webpage: profile, map

Demographics
- Population (2016): 115,463
- Electors (2015): 82,103
- Area (km²): 373
- Pop. density (per km²): 309.6
- Census division(s): Brant, Waterloo
- Census subdivision(s): Cambridge (part), North Dumfries

Cambridge is a federal electoral district in Ontario, Canada, that has been represented in the House of Commons of Canada since 1979.

== Geography ==
The district consists of most of the city of Cambridge, Ontario (the portion of it south of Highway 401), the entirety of the Township of North Dumfries, Ontario.

== History ==
The federal electoral district was created in 1976 and consisted of the city of Cambridge and the Township of North Dumfries. In 1987, part of the city of Kitchener was added to the district. In 1996, the boundaries were redrawn again to include a slightly different section of Kitchener. The current boundaries, which are the same as the original definition and contain no parts of Kitchener, were defined in 2003.

This riding lost territory to Kitchener South—Hespeler and gained some territory from Brant during the 2012 electoral redistribution. In the 2022 electoral redistribution it lost all of its territory in the County of Brant to Flamborough—Glanbrook—Brant North.

== Demographics ==
According to the 2021 Canadian census

Languages: 75.5% English, 4.2% Portuguese, 2.1% Punjabi, 1.6% Urdu, 1.4% Gujarati, 1.2% Spanish, 1.1% French

Religions: 55.6% Christian (28.9% Catholic, 4.4% Anglican, 3.7% United Church, 2.0% Presbyterian, 1.9% Baptist, 1.2% Lutheran, 1.2% Pentecostal, 1.1% Christian Orthodox, 11.2% other), 6.4% Muslim, 2.5% Hindu, 2.5% Sikh, 31.6% none

Median income: $41,600 (2020)

Average income: $51,650 (2020)

Panethnic groups in Cambridge (2011−2021)
Panethnic group	2021		2016		2011	
Panethnic group	Pop.	%	Pop.	%	Pop.	%
European (Note: Statistic includes all persons that did not make up part of a visible minority or an indigenous identity.)	91,825	76.47%	95,110	83.68%	95,365	86.42%
South Asian	12,690	10.57%	6,485	5.71%	5,105	4.63%
African	3,975	3.31%	2,735	2.41%	1,975	1.79%
Southeast Asian (Note: Statistic includes total responses of "Filipino" and "Southeast Asian" under visible minority section on census.)	2,960	2.47%	2,090	1.84%	1,800	1.63%
Indigenous	2,200	1.83%	2,305	2.03%	1,900	1.72%
Latin American	1,890	1.57%	1,295	1.14%	1,085	0.98%
Middle Eastern (Note: Statistic includes total responses of "West Asian" and "Arab" under visible minority section on census.)	1,710	1.42%	1,155	1.02%	1,015	0.92%
East Asian (Note: Statistic includes total responses of "Chinese", "Korean", and "Japanese" under visible minority section on census.)	1,420	1.18%	1,480	1.3%	1,315	1.19%
Other/multiracial (Note: Statistic includes total responses of "Visible minority, n.i.e." and "Multiple visible minorities" under visible minority section on census.)	1,400	1.17%	995	0.88%	795	0.72%
Total responses	120,075	98.99%	113,660	98.44%	110,355	98.8%
Total population	121,301	100%	115,463	100%	111,693	100%
Notes: Totals greater than 100% due to multiple origin responses. Demographics based on 2012 Canadian federal electoral redistribution riding boundaries.

=== 2023 representation ===
According to the 2021 Canadian census

Languages: 78.3% English, 4.3% Portuguese, 2.1% Punjabi, 1.6% Urdu, 1.6% French, 1.5% Gujarati, 1.2% Spanish
Race: 76.2% White, 10.7% South Asian, 3.3% Black, 1.8% Indigenous, 1.6% Latin American, 1.3% Southeast Asian, 1.2% Filipino, 1.0% Arab
Religions: 55.5% Christian (29.1% Catholic, 4.4% Anglican, 3.5% United Church, 2.0% Presbyterian, 1.9% Baptist, 1.2% Pentecostal, 1.2% Lutheran, 1.1% Christian Orthodox, 11.1% other), 6.5% Muslim, 2.6% Sikh, 2.5% Hindu, 31.5% none
Median income: $41,600 (2020)
Average income: $51,400 (2020)

== Members of Parliament ==
Parliament	Years	Member	Party
Cambridge; Riding created from Waterloo—Cambridge and Wellington
31st	1979–1980	Chris Speyer	Progressive Conservative
32nd	1980–1984	Chris Speyer	Progressive Conservative
33rd	1984–1988	Chris Speyer	Progressive Conservative
34th	1988–1993	Pat Sobeski	Progressive Conservative
35th	1993–1997	Janko Peric	Liberal
36th	1997–2000	Janko Peric	Liberal
37th	2000–2004	Janko Peric	Liberal
38th	2004–2006	Gary Goodyear	Conservative
39th	2006–2008	Gary Goodyear	Conservative
40th	2008–2011	Gary Goodyear	Conservative
41st	2011–2015	Gary Goodyear	Conservative
42nd	2015–2019	Bryan May	Liberal
43rd	2019–2021	Bryan May	Liberal
44th	2021–2025	Bryan May	Liberal
45th	2025–present	Connie Cody	Conservative

== Election results ==
2025 Canadian federal election
Party	Candidate	Votes	%	±%	Expenditures
Conservative	Connie Cody	31,766	48.6	+14.44	
Liberal	Bryan May	30,309	46.3	+8.08	
New Democratic	José de Lima	2,183	3.3	–13.76	
Green	Lux Burgess	1,052	1.6	–1.78	
Marxist–Leninist	Manuel Couto	109	0.2	N/A	
Total valid votes/expense limit		65,419	99.3	-0.1	
Total rejected ballots		438	0.7	+0.1	
Turnout		65,857	70.4	+9.1	
Eligible voters		93,618			
Conservative gain from Liberal		Swing		+3.18	
Source: Elections Canada

2021 federal election redistributed results
Party	Vote	%
Liberal	20,599	38.24
Conservative	18,389	34.14
New Democratic	9,204	17.09
People's	3,853	7.15
Green	1,825	3.39

2021 Canadian federal election
Party	Candidate	Votes	%	±%	Expenditures
Liberal	Bryan May	20,866	38.0	-1.5	$81,180.89
Conservative	Connie Cody	18,876	34.4	+4.4	$48,138.99
New Democratic	Lorne Bruce	9,319	17.0	-2.3	$12,300.84
People's	Maggie Segounis	3,931	7.2	+4.0	$3,523.25
Green	Michele Braniff	1,860	3.4	-4.1	$2,040.04
Total valid votes/expense limit		54,852	99.4	-0.06	$118,345.46
Total rejected ballots		335	0.6		
Turnout		55,187	61.3		
Eligible voters		90,092			
Liberal hold		Swing		-3.0	
Source: Elections Canada

2019 Canadian federal election
Party	Candidate	Votes	%	±%	Expenditures
Liberal	Bryan May	22,903	39.53	-3.64	$79,674.15
Conservative	Sunny Attwal	17,409	30.04	-8.6	none listed
New Democratic	Scott Hamilton	11,177	19.29	+5.42	$23,049.68
Green	Michele Braniff	4,343	7.5	+4.27	$7,369.06
People's	David Haskell	1,872	3.23	–	$7,178.82
Veterans Coalition	George McMorrow	162	0.28	–	$0.00
Marxist–Leninist	Manuel Couto	76	0.13	-0.07	$0.00
Total valid votes/expense limit		57,942	100.0		
Total rejected ballots		385			
Turnout		58,327	64.9		
Eligible voters		89,914			
Liberal hold		Swing		+2.48	
Source: Elections Canada

2015 Canadian federal election
Party	Candidate	Votes	%	±%	Expenditures
Liberal	Bryan May	23,024	43.17	+27.72	$57,941.86
Conservative	Gary Goodyear	20,613	38.65	-14.10	$73,286.38
New Democratic	Bobbi Stewart	7,397	13.87	-14.04	$10,151.06
Green	Michele Braniff	1,723	3.23	-0.37	$1,074.94
Independent	Lee Sperduti	474	0.89	–	$9,550.00
Marxist–Leninist	Manuel Couto	108	0.20		–
Total valid votes/expense limit		53,339	100.00		$219,622.08
Total rejected ballots		227	0.42	–	
Turnout		53,566	64.60	–	
Eligible voters		82,916			
Liberal gain from Conservative		Swing		+20.91	
Source: Elections Canada

2011 federal election redistributed results
Party	Vote	%
Conservative	23,644	52.74
New Democratic	12,512	27.91
Liberal	6,923	15.44
Green	1,615	3.60
Others	134	0.30

2011 Canadian federal election
Party	Candidate	Votes	%	±%	Expenditures
Conservative	Gary Goodyear	29,394	53.40	+4.78	$86,966.51
New Democratic	Susan Galvao	15,238	27.68	+8.07	$13,379.43
Liberal	Bryan May	8,285	15.05	-8.34	$26,622.63
Green	Jacques Malette	1,978	3.59	-4.76	$440.18
Marxist–Leninist	Manuel Couto	153	0.28	–	none listed
Total valid votes/expense limit		55,048	100.00	$96,491.18	
Total rejected ballots		255	0.46	+0.04	
Turnout		55,303	59.25	+3.33	
Eligible voters		93,335	–	–	

2008 Canadian federal election
Party	Candidate	Votes	%	±%	Expenditures
Conservative	Gary Goodyear	24,895	48.62	+4.78	$83,772
Liberal	Gord Zeilstra	11,977	23.39	-10.21	$8,316
New Democratic	Max Lombardi	10,044	19.61	+2.67	$12,035
Green	Scott Cosman	4,279	8.35	+3.13	$1,614
Total valid votes/expense limit		51,195	100.00	$93,018	
Total rejected ballots		217	0.42	+0.06	
Turnout		51,412	55.92	-9.05	

2006 Canadian federal election
Party	Candidate	Votes	%	±%
Conservative	Gary Goodyear	25,337	43.84	+5.9
Liberal	Janko Peric	19,419	33.60	−3.1
New Democratic	Donna Reid	9,794	16.94	−3.3
Green	Gareth White	3,017	5.22	+0.2
Canadian Action	David Pelly	217	0.37	
Total valid votes		57,784	100.00	
Total rejected ballots		207	0.36	
Turnout		57,991	64.97	

2004 Canadian federal election
Party	Candidate	Votes
Conservative	Gary Goodyear	19,123
Liberal	Janko Peric	18,899
New Democratic	Gary Price	10,392
Green	Gareth White	2,506
Christian Heritage	John Gots	395
Independent	John Oprea	134
Independent	Alec Gryc	114
Total valid votes
Total rejected ballots
Turnout
Electors on lists

2000 Canadian federal election
Party	Candidate	Votes	%	±%
Liberal	Janko Peric	22,148	46.6	+9.9
Alliance	Reg Petersen	14,915	31.4	+9.0
Progressive Conservative	John Housser	5,988	12.6	-6.7
New Democratic	Pam Wolf	4,111	8.6	-11.8
Natural Law	Thomas Mitchell	210	0.4	
Independent	John Gots	160	0.3	
Total valid votes		47,532	100.0	

Note: Canadian Alliance vote is compared to the Reform vote in 1997 election.

1997 Canadian federal election
Party	Candidate	Votes	%	±%	Expenditures
Liberal	Janko Peric	17,673	36.74	−2.52	$47,605
Reform	Bill Donaldson	10,767	22.38	−11.15	$57,325
New Democratic	Mike Farnan	9,813	20.40	+15.11	$53,588
Progressive Conservative	Larry Olney	9,299	19.33	+1.99	$48,139
Independent	John H. Long	311	0.65		$0
Independent	Jim Remnant	237	0.49		$0
Total valid votes		48,100	100.00		
Total rejected ballots		254			
Turnout		48,354	64.77	−1.75	
Electors on the lists		74,659			
Percentage change figures are factored for redistribution.
Sources: Official Results, Elections Canada and Financial Returns, Elections Canada.

1993 Canadian federal election
Party	Candidate	Votes	%	±%
Liberal	Janko Peric	21,997	39.1	+12.3
Reform	Reg Petersen	18,932	33.7	
Progressive Conservative	Pat Sobeski	9,776	17.4	-23.0
New Democratic	Bill McBain	2,962	5.3	-22.8
National	Ron Cooper	1,804	3.2	
Christian Heritage	Michael Picard	407	0.7	-3.8
Natural Law	Thomas Mitchell	370	0.7	
Total valid votes		56,248	100.0	

1988 Canadian federal election
Party	Candidate	Votes	%	±%
Progressive Conservative	Pat Sobeski	20,578	40.4	-20.2
New Democratic	Bruce Davidson	14,298	28.1	+3.9
Liberal	Ron Cooper	13,639	26.8	+12.1
Christian Heritage	Rien Vanden Enden	2,305	4.5	
Independent	Shafiq Hudda	141	0.3	
Total valid votes		50,961	100.0	

1984 Canadian federal election
Party	Candidate	Votes	%	±%
Progressive Conservative	Chris Speyer	22,963	60.6	+21.2
New Democratic	Bill McBain	9,171	24.2	-7.0
Liberal	Lyn Johnston	5,545	14.6	-14.3
Rhinoceros	John Jagiellowicz	103	0.3	
Commonwealth of Canada	Peter Harz	112	0.3	
Total valid votes		37,894	100.0	

1980 Canadian federal election
Party	Candidate	Votes	%	±%
Progressive Conservative	Chris Speyer	14,314	39.4	-4.2
New Democratic	Mike Farnan	11,346	31.2	+1.7
Liberal	David Charlton	10,531	29.0	+2.6
Social Credit	Regent Gervais	103	0.3	-0.1
Marxist–Leninist	Anna Di Carlo	82	0.2	0.0
Total valid votes		36,376	100.0	
lop.parl.ca

1979 Canadian federal election
Party	Candidate	Votes	%
Progressive Conservative	Chris Speyer	16,337	43.5
New Democratic	Marc Sommerville	11,085	29.5
Liberal	Lee Palvetzian	9,903	26.4
Social Credit	Regent Gervais	150	0.4
Marxist–Leninist	Anna Di Carlo	78	0.2
Total valid votes		37,553	100.0

== See also ==
- List of Canadian electoral districts
- Historical federal electoral districts of Canada
