= 2010 Oxford County municipal elections =

Local election in Ontario, Canada

Elections were held in Oxford County, Ontario on October 25, 2010 in conjunction with municipal elections across the province.

== Oxford County Council ==
County council consists of the mayors of the municipalities plus two "city and county" councillors from Woodstock.

Position	Elected
Blandford-Blenheim Mayor	Marion Wearn
East Zorra-Tavistock Mayor	Don E. McKay]
Ingersoll Mayor	Ted J. Comiskey
Norwich Mayor	Donald Doan
South-West Oxford Mayor	David Mayberry
Tilsonburg Mayor	John Lessif
Woodstock Mayor	Pat Sobeski
Woodstock Councillor	Deb A. Tait
Woodstock Councillor	Sandra J. Talbot
Zorra Mayor	Margaret E. Lupton

== Blandford-Blenheim ==
Mayoral Candidate	Vote	%
Marion Wearn	1,053	54.70
Kenn R. Howling (X)	872	45.30

== East Zorra-Tavistock ==
Mayoral Candidate	Vote	%
Don E. McKay (X)	Acclaimed	

== Ingersoll ==
Mayoral Candidate	Vote	%
Ted J. Comiskey	2,162	48.4
Paul Holbrough (X)	1,753	39.3
Brian J. Pye	263	5.9
Tim W. Lobzun	203	4.5
Glenn L. Malcolm	84	1.9

== Norwich ==
Mayoral Candidate	Vote	%
Donald Doan (X)	1,699	68.2
Alan Dale	793	31.8

== South-West Oxford ==
Mayoral Candidate	Vote	%
David Mayberry	1,787	76.7
Milt Chesterman	542	23.3

== Tillsonburg ==
Mayoral Candidate	Vote	%
John Lessif	2,501	53.3
Stephen Molnar (X)	2,194	46.7

== Woodstock ==
Mayoral Candidate	Vote	%
Pat Sobeski	6,073	68.41
Michael Harding (X)	1,904	21.45
Jim Bender	900	10.14

== Zorra ==
Mayoral Candidate	Vote	%
Margaret E. Lupton (X)	Acclaimed	
