= Chris Speyer (politician) =

Canadian politician

Member of the Canada Parliament for Cambridge
- In office May 22, 1979 – November 21, 1988
- Preceded by: Max Saltsman
- Succeeded by: Pat Sobeski

Personal details
- Born: 24 March 1941 (age 85)
- Party: Progressive Conservative
- Occupation: Lawyer, Judge

Chris Speyer (born 24 March 1941) is a former Progressive Conservative party member of the House of Commons of Canada. He was a criminal lawyer by career.

Speyer was born in Toronto, Ontario, Canada. He represented the Ontario riding of Cambridge where he was first elected in 1979. Speyer was re-elected in 1980 and 1984, serving successive terms from the 31st to the 33rd Canadian Parliaments.

Speyer left national politics in 1988 and did not campaign in that year's federal election. He served as a judge of the Ontario Superior Court of Justice in Toronto until 2017.

== Electoral record ==
1984 Canadian federal election: Cambridge
Party	Candidate	Votes	%	±%
Progressive Conservative	Chris Speyer	22,963	60.6	+21.2
New Democratic	Bill McBain	9,171	24.2	-7.0
Liberal	Lyn Johnston	5,545	14.6	-14.3
Rhinoceros	John Jagiellowicz	103	0.3	
Commonwealth of Canada	Peter Harz	112	0.3	
Total valid votes		37,894	100.0	

1980 Canadian federal election: Cambridge
Party	Candidate	Votes	%	±%
Progressive Conservative	Chris Speyer	14,314	39.4	-4.2
New Democratic	Mike Farnan	11,346	31.2	+1.7
Liberal	David Charlton	10,531	29.0	+2.6
Social Credit	Regent Gervais	103	0.3	-0.1
Marxist–Leninist	Anna Di Carlo	82	0.2	0.0
Total valid votes		36,376	100.0	
lop.parl.ca

1979 Canadian federal election: Cambridge
Party	Candidate	Votes	%
Progressive Conservative	Chris Speyer	16,337	43.5
New Democratic	Marc Sommerville	11,085	29.5
Liberal	Lee Palvetzian	9,903	26.4
Social Credit	Regent Gervais	150	0.4
Marxist–Leninist	Anna Di Carlo	78	0.2
Total valid votes		37,553	100.0
