= Pierre Jacob =

Canadian politician

Member of Parliament for Brome—Missisquoi
- In office May 2, 2011 – October 19, 2015
- Preceded by: Christian Ouellet
- Succeeded by: Denis Paradis

Personal details
- Born: January 29, 1953 Trois-Rivières, Quebec, Canada
- Died: July 21, 2018 (aged 65)
- Party: New Democratic Party

Pierre Jacob (January 29, 1953 – July 21, 2018) was a Canadian politician, he was elected to the House of Commons of Canada in 2011 and served until 2015. He represented the electoral district of Brome—Missisquoi as a member of the New Democratic Party.

Prior to being elected, Jacob was a youth offenders instructor. He held a college diploma in social sciences and psychology, a bachelor's degree in criminology and law and an advanced diploma in public administration.

Suffering from health problems, Jacob did not stand in the 2015 election. He died in 2018.
