= Pat Sobeski =

Canadian politician (1951–2016)

- Sobeski in May 2012

Member of Parliament for Cambridge
- In office 1988–1993
- Preceded by: Chris Speyer
- Succeeded by: Janko Peric

City councillor of Woodstock, Ontario
- In office 2003–2010

Mayor of Woodstock, Ontario
- In office 2010–2014
- Preceded by: Michael Harding
- Succeeded by: Trevor T. Birtch

Personal details
- Born: Patrick Anthony Sobeski; 25 July 1951 Woodstock, Ontario, Canada
- Died: 17 March 2016 (aged 64) Woodstock, Ontario, Canada
- Party: Progressive Conservative
- Profession: architect

Patrick Anthony "Pat" Sobeski (25 July 1951 – 17 March 2016) was a Canadian politician, who has served as a member of the House of Commons of Canada from 1988 to 1993, and as mayor of Woodstock from 2010 to 2014.

He was elected in the 1988 federal election at the Cambridge electoral district for the Progressive Conservative party. He served in the 34th Canadian Parliament but lost to Janko Peric of the Liberal Party in the 1993 federal election, finishing with less than half of Peric's votes, and even behind the Reform party's Reg Petersen.

Sobeski served as a municipal councillor in Woodstock, Ontario beginning in 2003. He was elected as the mayor of Woodstock in the 2010 municipal election, defeating incumbent Michael Harding.

Sobeski was defeated by Birtch in a faceoff along with former Mayor Harding in 2014. He died on 17 March 2016.

== Electoral record ==
1993 Canadian federal election: Cambridge
Party	Candidate	Votes	%	±%
Liberal	Janko Peric	21,997	39.1	+12.3
Reform	Reg Petersen	18,932	33.7	
Progressive Conservative	Pat Sobeski	9,776	17.4	-23.0
New Democratic	Bill McBain	2,962	5.3	-22.8
National	Ron Cooper	1,804	3.2	
Christian Heritage	Michael Picard	407	0.7	-3.8
Natural Law	Thomas Mitchell	370	0.7	
Total valid votes		56,248	100.0	

1988 Canadian federal election: Cambridge
Party	Candidate	Votes	%	±%
Progressive Conservative	Pat Sobeski	20,578	40.4	-20.2
New Democratic	Bruce Davidson	14,298	28.1	+3.9
Liberal	Ron Cooper	13,639	26.8	+12.1
Christian Heritage	Rien Vanden Enden	2,305	4.5	
Independent	Shafiq Hudda	141	0.3	
Total valid votes		50,961	100.0	
