= Mike Farnan =

Canadian politician (1941–2024)

Ontario MPP
- In office 1987–1995
- Preceded by: Bill Barlow
- Succeeded by: Gerry Martiniuk
- Constituency: Cambridge

More...

Personal details
- Born: Michael Liam Farnan; 29 January 1941 Dublin, Ireland
- Died: 24 June 2024 (aged 83) Cambridge, Ontario, Canada
- Party: New Democratic Party
- Occupation: Teacher, real estate agent

Michael Liam Farnan (29 January 1941 – 24 June 2024) was an Irish-born Canadian politician. He was an Ontario New Democratic Party member of the Legislative Assembly of Ontario from 1987 to 1995, and served as a cabinet minister in the government of Bob Rae.

== Background ==
Farnan was educated at University College Dublin, the National University of Ireland; the University of London in England; and McGill University in Montreal, Quebec, Canada. He had a Master's degree in Education, and a bachelor's degree of arts. He worked as a primary and secondary school teacher in London, Montreal, Cambridge, Ontario and Brampton Ontario for twenty-seven years. A devout Roman Catholic working within Ontario's separate school system, he served as provincial director of the Ontario English Catholic Teacher's Association for a time, as well as participating in a variety of community outreach projects in Cambridge. After he retired in 2002, he studied to become a real estate agent and broker of his own company Mike Farnan Realty in Cambridge. He also served as associate broker for Crown Realty Royal Le Page and for Peak Realty, both located in Cambridge.

Farnan died on 24 June 2024, at the age of 83. He had pancreatic cancer and died by medical assistance in dying.

== Politics ==
Farnan ran for the federal New Democratic Party in Cambridge during the 1980 federal election. He came second, 3,080 votes behind Progressive Conservative Chris Speyer. He also served on the Cambridge city council for the period in the 1980s.

Farnan was elected to the Ontario legislature in the 1987 provincial election, defeating Liberal candidate Claudette Millar in the provincial riding of Cambridge (incumbent Progressive Conservative Bill Barlow finished third). The NDP were the official opposition in this period, and Farnan served as his party's critic for Correctional Services and Tourism and Recreation.

The NDP won a majority government in the 1990 provincial election, and Farnan was re-elected by a landslide in Cambridge. On 1 October 1990, he was appointed the Rae government's first Solicitor General and Minister of Correctional Services.

As Solicitor-General, Farnan introduced employment equity provisions for Ontario's police force. He also established a "common pause day" which continued the province's previous restrictions on Sunday shopping. In the spring of 1991, he became involved in a minor controversy concerning two letters which had been sent from his staff to Justices of the Peace in Ontario, one of which requested the review of a case. This was seen by some as inappropriate interference from his office, and while Farnan did not write the letters himself, he was nonetheless dropped from cabinet on 31 July 1991. In September 1991 he was appointed Deputy Chairman of the house and he served in that role for the next two years.

On 17 June 1993, Farnan was re-appointed a Minister without portfolio responsible for Education and Training. In this capacity, he served as an assistant to Minister of Education Dave Cooke.

Farnan returned to a full cabinet position on 21 October 1994, having been appointed Minister of Transportation.

In 1994, Farnan was one of twelve NDP members to vote against Bill 167, a bill extending financial benefits to same-sex partners. Premier Bob Rae allowed a free vote on the bill which allowed members of his party to vote with their conscience.

The NDP were defeated in the 1995 provincial election, and Farnan lost the Cambridge seat to Progressive Conservative Gerry Martiniuk by about 5,500 votes. He ran a second time for the House of Commons of Canada in the 1997 federal election, but finished third against Liberal Janko Peric.

=== Cabinet positions ===
Rae ministry, Province of Ontario (1990–1995)
Cabinet posts (4)
Predecessor	Office	Successor
Gilles Pouliot	Minister of Transportation of Ontario; 1994–1995	Al Palladini
Steven Offer	Solicitor General; 1990–1991; Also responsible for anti-drug strategy	Allan Pilkey
Richard Patten	Minister of Correctional Services; 1990–1991	Allan Pilkey
Sub-Cabinet Post
Predecessor	Title	Successor
Shelley Wark-Martyn	Minister Without Portfolio (1993–1994); Responsible for Education and Training	Steve Owens

== After politics ==
After losing his seat in 1995, Farnan became a school teacher at St. Thomas Aquinas Secondary School in Brampton, Ontario. He specialized in social science courses (mainly Religion). He retired in December 1996.

== Electoral record ==
=== Provincial ===
1987 Ontario general election: Cambridge
Party	Candidate	Votes	%	±%	Expenditures
New Democratic	Mike Farnan	11,284	34.49		$27,661
Liberal	Claudette Millar	11,183	34.18	–	$42,172
Progressive Conservative	Bill Barlow	8,752	26.75		$29,793
Family Coalition	Anneliese Steden	1,500	4.58	–	$8,623
Total valid votes		32,719	100.00		

1990 Ontario general election: Cambridge
Party	Candidate	Votes	%	±%	Expenditures
New Democratic	Mike Farnan	21,806	60.28	+25.79	$32,413
Liberal	John K. Bell	7,557	20.89	−13.29	$40,099
Progressive Conservative	Carl DeFaria	4,449	12.30	−14.45	$33,935
Family Coalition	Anneliese Steden	2,364	6.53	+1.95	$11,367
Total valid votes		36,176	100.00		
Rejected, unmarked and declined ballots		513			
Turnout		36,689	64.84		
Electors on the lists		56,581			

1995 Ontario general election
Party	Candidate	Votes	%	±%
Progressive Conservative	Gerry Martiniuk	17,269	46.9	+34.6
New Democratic	Mike Farnan	11,797	32.1	-28.2
Liberal	Ben Tucci	5,606	15.2	-5.7
Family Coalition	Al Smith	1,690	4.6	-1.9
Independent	Reg Gervais	433	1.2	–
Total valid votes		36,795	100.0	

=== Federal ===
1997 Canadian federal election: Cambridge
Party	Candidate	Votes	%	±%	Expenditures
Liberal	Janko Peric	17,673	36.74	−2.52	$47,605
Reform	Bill Donaldson	10,767	22.38	−11.15	$57,325
New Democratic	Mike Farnan	9,813	20.40	+15.11	$53,588
Progressive Conservative	Larry Olney	9,299	19.33	+1.99	$48,139
Independent	John H. Long	311	0.65		$0
Independent	Jim Remnant	237	0.49		$0
Total valid votes		48,100	100.00		
Total rejected ballots		254			
Turnout		48,354	64.77	−1.75	
Electors on the lists		74,659			
Percentage change figures are factored for redistribution.
Sources: Official Results, Elections Canada and Financial Returns, Elections Canada.

1980 Canadian federal election: Cambridge
Party	Candidate	Votes	%	±%
Progressive Conservative	Chris Speyer	14,314	39.4	-4.2
New Democratic	Mike Farnan	11,346	31.2	+1.7
Liberal	David Charlton	10,531	29.0	+2.6
Social Credit	Regent Gervais	103	0.3	-0.1
Marxist–Leninist	Anna Di Carlo	82	0.2	0.0
Total valid votes		36,376	100.0	
lop.parl.ca
