= David Marler =

Canadian lawyer (1941–2025)

David Francis Herbert Marler (born October 3, 1941, died January 2, 2025) was a Canadian lawyer in Knowlton, Quebec who specialized in transportation and international law. He has been a candidate for the House of Commons of Canada on two occasions.

== Early life, career, and family ==
Marler was born in Montreal, Quebec. After graduating from Malvern College in England, Marler received a Bachelor of Arts degree in literature from Bishop's University (1962) and a Bachelor of Laws degree from McGill University (1965). He has published articles on maritime law, served as city councillor in Lac-Tremblant-Nord (1970–72), and been a director of the Brome Lake Chamber of Commerce. He is member of the United Church of Canada. Since 1995, was Senior & Managing Partner at the law firm of Marler & Associates.

Marler's family has been active in politics and government for many decades. He is the grandson of Herbert Meredith Marler, who served as a cabinet minister in the government of William Lyon Mackenzie King, and a grand-nephew of George Carlyle Marler, who was a cabinet minister in the governments of Louis St. Laurent and Jean Lesage.

== Federal politics ==
Marler moved to Brome—Missisquoi in 2003 and ran for the Conservative Party of Canada in the 2006 federal election, after defeating Jacques Dalton for the nomination. He highlighted his support for provincial rights within the Canadian constitution and actively supported his party's promise for more free votes in the House of Commons of Canada. Marler's campaign manager described him as "the least conservative of Conservative candidates." He finished third against Bloc Québécois candidate Christian Ouellet.

In December 2006, Marler was appointed as a commissioner on the Eastern Townships School Board to replace an incumbent who had resigned. He did not seek re-election in late 2007.

Marler left the Conservative Party in January 2008. He has said that he refused to accept thirty thousand dollars via the party's controversial "in-and-out" transfer scheme during the 2006 election, and that party officials later informed him they did not want him as a candidate in 2008. The Conservative Party rejected the accusation. (Under the "in-and-out" scheme, the Conservatives transferred national campaign money into individual ridings and before transferring it out again to pay for national advertising. In this way, the party was able to avoid national spending limits. Marler has said that he refused the transfer because he did not know what the money was for and could not get a clear explanation from party officials.)

In the 2008 election, Marler published a piece entitled, "Sixty-Six Said Yes; a Personal Account of a Campaign and a Scandal," covering his involvement with the Conservative Party. He ran as an independent, saying that a Conservative majority government would be dangerous for Canadian democracy.

Marler died on January 2, 2025 in Thunder Bay, Ontario.

== Electoral record ==
2008 Canadian federal election: Brome—Missisquoi
Party	Candidate	Votes	%	±%	Expenditures
Bloc Québécois	Christian Ouellet	17,561	35.21	−3.12	$75,915
Liberal	Denis Paradis	16,357	32.79	+4.82	$66,462
Conservative	Mark Quinlan	9,309	18.66	−1.69	$78,614
New Democratic	Christelle Bogosta	4,514	9.05	+3.20	$4,678
Green	Pierre Brassard	1,784	3.58	+0.03	$126
Independent	David Marler	354	0.71		$16,915
Total valid votes		49,879	100.00		
Total rejected ballots		531			
Turnout		50,410	65.78	−0.46	
Electors on the lists		76,636			

2006 Canadian federal election: Brome—Missisquoi
Party	Candidate	Votes	%	±%	Expenditures
Bloc Québécois	Christian Ouellet	18,596	38.33	−1.33	$66,782
Liberal	Denis Paradis	13,569	27.97	−14.11	$58,420
Conservative	David Marler	9,874	20.35	+9.30	$69,104
New Democratic	Josianne Jetté	2,839	5.85	+3.19	$2,722
Progressive Canadian	Heward Grafftey	1,921	3.96		$60,081
Green	Michel Champagne	1,721	3.55	−1.00	$2,460
Total valid votes		48,520	100.00		
Total rejected ballots		554			
Turnout		49,074	66.24	+3.61	
Electors on the lists		74,088			
Sources: Official Results, Elections Canada and Financial Returns, Elections Canada.
