= Bill Barlow =

Canadian politician (1931–2020)

Ontario MPP
- In office 1981–1987
- Preceded by: Monty Davidson
- Succeeded by: Mike Farnan
- Constituency: Cambridge

Personal details
- Born: February 20, 1931 Galt, Ontario
- Died: July 5, 2020 (aged 89) Cambridge, Ontario
- Party: Progressive Conservative Party
- Occupation: Company executive

William Walter Barlow (February 20, 1931 – July 5, 2020) was a Canadian politician in Ontario, Canada. He served in the Legislative Assembly of Ontario from 1981 to 1987, as a member of the Progressive Conservative Party.

== Background ==
Barlow was born in Galt (now Cambridge), Ontario. He was educated at Galt Business College, and served as president of a trucking company.

== Politics ==
Barlow was a city alderman for ten years.

He first campaigned for the Ontario legislature in the 1977 provincial election, and lost to New Democratic Party incumbent Monty Davidson in the Cambridge constituency by 554 votes. He ran again in the 1981 election, and defeated Davidson by 849 votes. The Progressive Conservatives won a majority government, and Barlow served in the legislature as a backbench supporter of the Bill Davis and Frank Miller administrations.

He was re-elected in the 1985 election, defeating NDP candidate Alec Dufresne by 903 votes. The PCs fell to a minority government in this election, and were soon defeated in the legislature. In opposition, Barlow served as his party's critic for Transportation and Communications and Small Business.

The Progressive Conservatives fell to 16 seats out of 130 in the 1987 election. Barlow finished third in Cambridge, losing to Mike Farnan of the New Democratic Party.

== Later life ==
Barlow was appointed to the Cambridge Art Theatre Management Committee in 2005. Barlow died at home on July 5, 2020, at the age of 89.
