= Cordiant Digital Infrastructure =

British investment trust

Cordiant Digital Infrastructure Limited
- Type: Public limited company
- Traded as: LSE: CORD
- Industry: Investment Management
- Founded: 2021
- Headquarters: St Peter Port, Guernsey,
- Key people: Shonaid Jemmett-Page (Chair)
- Website: www.cordiantdigitaltrust.com

Cordiant Digital Infrastructure Limited (LSE: CORD), is a large British investment trust focused on investments in infrastructure relating to the digital economy. The company is listed on the London Stock Exchange and is a constituent of the FTSE 250 Index.

== History ==
The company was established by a Montreal-based investment management business, Cordiant Capital, in February 2021. The company's first deal was with the Czech Republic–based digital infrastructure company CRA.

Subsequent investments by the company have included an Irish open access infrastructure provider, Speed Fibre, in December 2023, a large Belgian data centre provider, DCU Invest, in October 2024, and the wholesale fibre and business connectivity unit of BT Ireland in September 2025.

The chair is Shonaid Jemmett-Page, who was appointed when the company was launched.
