= Gary Goodyear =

Canadian politician (born 1958)

The Honourable Doctor Gary Goodyear PC
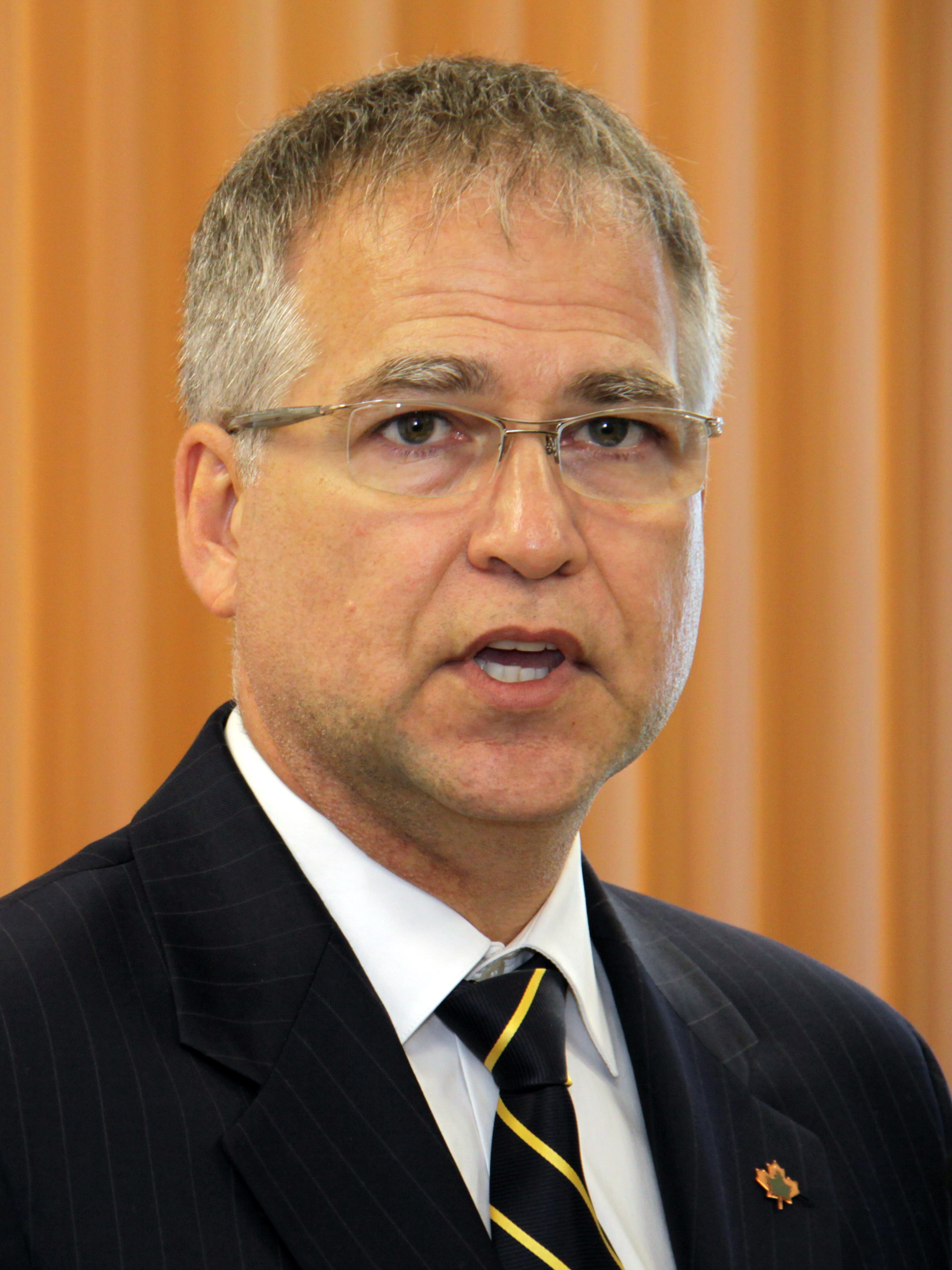

Member of Parliament for Cambridge
- In office June 28, 2004 – August 4, 2015
- Preceded by: Janko Peric
- Succeeded by: Bryan May

Chair of the Standing Committee on Procedure & House Affairs
- In office April 6, 2006 – March 5, 2007
- Minister: Rob Nicholson; Peter Van Loan
- Preceded by: Don Boudria
- Succeeded by: Joe Preston

Personal details
- Born: March 10, 1958 (age 68) Cambridge, Ontario, Canada
- Party: Conservative
- Spouse: Valerie Goodyear
- Profession: Chiropractor

Gary T. Goodyear PC (born March 10, 1958) is a Canadian politician. He was a member of the House of Commons of Canada from 2004 to 2015, having been elected to represent the riding of Cambridge as a Conservative in 2004. On October 30, 2008, he was named Minister of State for Science & Technology within Prime Minister Stephen Harper's Cabinet. Goodyear was re-elected in the May 2nd elections in 2011 and returned to Stephen Harper's cabinet as Minister of State for Science & Technology. He was replaced in this capacity by Greg Rickford on July 15, 2013.

Goodyear was defeated by Liberal Candidate Bryan May, in the 2015 Canadian federal election.

== Education and chiropractic career ==
Goodyear was raised and educated in Cambridge, Ontario. After high school he attended the University of Waterloo, studying in Biomechanics and Psychology, but left without completing a degree.

He afterwards attended the Canadian Memorial Chiropractic College, where he graduated cum laude, was class president, and valedictorian. He started his full-time practice in Cambridge in 1984 where he was Clinic Director, Director of Patient Services and Past President of Future Recovery Canada. He was a co-designer of the three year post-graduate Sports Fellowship Program. He also co-authored "Practice Guidelines" and was Public Relations Director and Past President for the College of Chiropractic Sports Sciences in Toronto. He was also the health columnist for the Cambridge Times newspaper from 1986 to 1996, and has taught at the Canadian Memorial Chiropractic College and the University of Waterloo..

== Political career ==
In the 2004 federal election, Goodyear defeated incumbent Liberal Janko Peric by 224 votes (as confirmed on recount) to win the Cambridge riding. After the election, Goodyear was named Ontario Chair of the Conservative Party caucus. He was re-elected in 2006 with the endorsement of Vote Marriage Canada, and was also endorsed by the Canadian Islamic Congress receiving a grade of A In 2006, he won the riding of Cambridge by almost 6,000 votes.

After the 2006 federal election Goodyear was elected Standing committee chair of the Procedure and House Affairs Committee (of which he chairs the Subcommittee on Parliament Hill Security.) In March 2008 the Procedure and House Affairs Committee ousted Goodyear by moving a motion of non-confidence in him. The committee then elected Conservative MP Joe Preston as the chair against his will, and he called no meetings before resigning from his position. The committee currently has no chair and has not met since March 6. Jay Hill, Conservative party whip, said he is adamant that unless the opposition is willing to meet to re-elect Goodyear as the chair and to withdraw the motion to study the In and Out scandal, there will be no Procedure and House Affairs committee meetings. The Speaker of the House made a ruling on the events in this committee and others which stated rulings by committee chairs are being routinely overturned by majority votes, even when the rulings are procedurally sound. Such a state of affairs has led to "general lawlessness" at committees. Goodyear also chairs Subcommittee on Agenda and Procedure He was also named chairman of the all-party Canada-Armenia Parliamentary Friendship Group.

A former campaign manager for Goodyear admits he negotiated a lease for a campaign headquarters in 2004 that said the landlord would make a political donation to Goodyear's election bid. In a compliance agreement with the Commissioner of Canada Elections, Reg Petersen "acknowledged an act that constitutes an offence" under the Elections Act. The Conservative Party's spokesperson, Ryan Sparrow, responded that the error was a mistake made by a first-time campaign manager and noted that "Elections Canada has acknowledged that [Peterson] made a mistake and no further action has been taken."

=== Role in cabinet ===
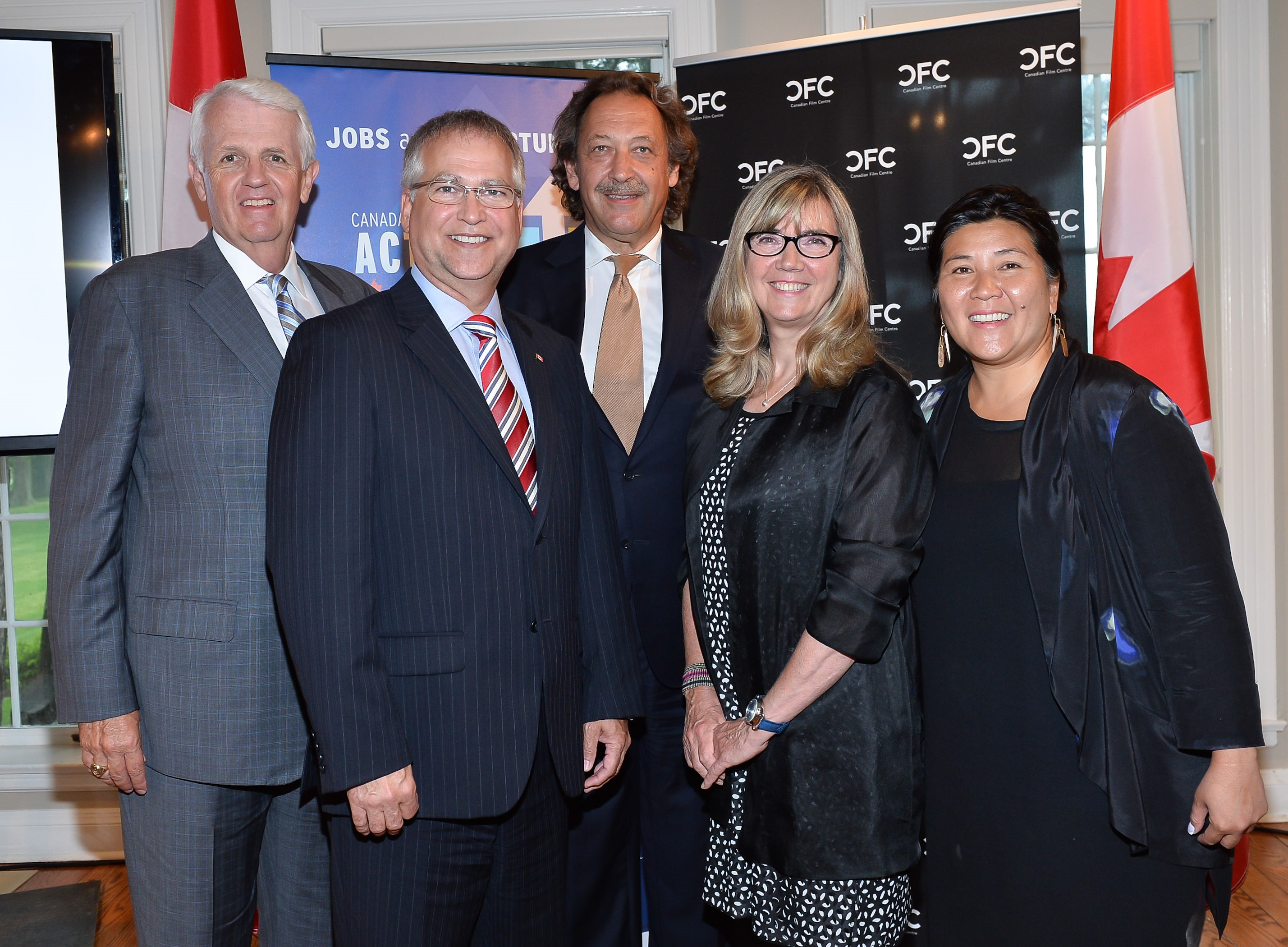
John Carmichael, MP; Gary Goodyear, Minister of State; Slawko Klykiw; Christina Jennings, chair, CFC Board of Directors; Ana Serrano @ Canadian Film Centre

Following the Conservative victory in the 2008 federal election, Goodyear was appointed to the cabinet portfolio of Minister of State for Science and Technology.

=== Federal Economic Development Agency for Southern Ontario (FedDev Ontario) ===
In 2009 named Minister of State responsible for the Federal Economic Development Agency for Southern Ontario (FedDev Ontario) created by the federal government through Budget 2009 to "support Ontario’s then floundering economy." FedDev Ontario had a $1-billion budget for 2009–2014. Among other things, FedDev helped small companies develop new products faster, similar to the role played by the Industrial Research Assistance Program (NRC IRAP).

In May 2012 Jameson Berkow of reported in the Financial Post that halfway its mandate, "Mr. Goodyear’s Federal Economic Development Agency for Southern Ontario [...] appears to have enjoyed unbridled success in helping Canada’s most populous province save itself from economic oblivion."

== Minister of State for Science and Technology 2008 ==
Under the federal Minister of State for Science and Technology, Gary Goodyear, the NRC became a "toolbox for industry" and dented basic-research infrastructure.

Goodyear, the minister of state for science and technology, has presided over the most retrograde federal Science and Technology policy in memory. During his tenure, the government shuttered the office of the National Science Adviser, blocked asbestos from a UN hazardous chemicals list on which it clearly belongs, gutted the Fisheries Act, gutted the Navigable Waters Protection Act, set out to weaken the Species at Risk Act, killed the long-form census, eroded Environment Canada’s ability to monitor climate change, earned an international reputation for muzzling scientists and, at a great potential cost, defunded the world’s leading freshwater research centre... At the same time, changes to our science-funding regime and a makeover of the National Research Council, Canada’s science agency, into a tool box for industry have dented our basic-research infrastructure and damaged our prospects for innovation.

— Himelfarb 2014

In early 2009, Goodyear oversaw $147.9 million in funding cuts for science programs, the most prominent being the lack of any funding for new projects for Genome Canada. Critics of the cuts, including a team of neuroscientists who lost funding, argued that when coupled with the Obama administration's increased funding for science, the cuts could produce a brain drain as researchers move to the United States and secure funding.

June 2009 saw Goodyear recommending the SSHRC withdraw a $19,750 funding grant for a future of Israel and Palestine conference because it was deemed by the Minister to be too anti-Israel. Goodyear responded, saying that he did call the SSHRC to ask for a funding review, but denied he asked them to cancel the grant.

== Economic Action Plan ==
Under Goodyear, federal science and technology expenditures reached nearly $11.9 billion in 2010–11. In the Economic Action Plan 2012, the federal government announced that one billion new dollars are to be invested in science and technology.

Under the Economic Action Plan, the National Research Council was transformed into a research and technology organization that focuses on "business-led research." On 7 May 2013, the NRC launched its new "business approach" in which it offered only four "business lines": "strategic research and development, technical services, management of science and technology infrastructure and NRC-Industrial Research Assistance Program (IRAP). These four business lines are intended to shorten the gap between early stage research and development and commercialization. NRC is focus "real-world applications" was the creation of the Canadian Wheat Alliance, (CWA) in 2013 with NRC, Agriculture and Agri-Food Canada, the Government of Saskatchewan and the University of Saskatchewan. With a budget of approximately $97 million (2013–2018), the Canadian Wheat Alliance will study improving the yield of Canadian wheat even in extreme weather, integrating "basic research with genetic improvement" of wheat crops, and research on efficient use of chemical fertilizers. Working with the Crop Development Centre they will be integrating "basic research with genetic improvement" of wheat. The second major industry-led research in 2013 is the Algal Carbon Conversion Pilot Project, development of an algae system to recycle carbon emissions from the oil sands, with plans for a $19 million facility to be constructed in Alberta, in partnership between the NRC and industry partners, Canadian Natural Resources Limited (Canadian Natural) and Pond Biofuels.

The Canadian Wheat Alliance will improve the quality of Canadian wheat, and enhance Canada’s competitive position in the growing world market," said Federal Agriculture Minister Gerry Ritz, on behalf of the Honorable Gary Goodyear, Minister of State (Science and Technology). "The benefits of this Alliance will flow throughout the entire value chain, strengthening our producers’ bottom lines and our overall economy.

— 7 May 2013

== Political controversies ==
=== View on evolution ===
In a March 2009 interview, The Globe and Mail asked Goodyear if he believed in evolution. He responded, "I am a Christian, and I don't think anybody asking a question about my religion is appropriate." While many scientists and educators expressed shock at this, others defended the minister, citing statistics that show 52% of Canadians believe God played a role in creation. Later that day, however, Goodyear said that he believed in evolution during an interview with CTV News. When asked to clarify this belief, Goodyear responded "We are evolving, every year, every decade. That’s a fact. Whether it’s to the intensity of the sun, whether it’s to, as a chiropractor, walking on cement versus anything else, whether it’s running shoes or high heels, of course, we are evolving to our environment." He also garnered criticism from MP Elizabeth May, among others, for a comment during a debate on an NDP opposition motion in June 2012. Parliamentary proceedings for June 15, 2012, record Goodyear as saying,

Madam Speaker, what I would recommend to the hon. member is that when he tightens that towel around his neck at nighttime that he not do it for more than 20 seconds. It actually ends up causing cerebral anoxia that leaves permanent brain damage.

— Goodyear 5 June 2012

This comment was in response to a question by MP Bruce Hyer, again concerning Goodyear's belief in evolution,

I have a broad question for the minister. Does he really believe in science and the implications of scientific inquiry? I have a more specific question that will put a fine point on it. There is a vast bunch of science out there that says that life was created on this planet three to four billion years ago, and there are other theories. Does the minister believe that life was created on this planet through evolution three to four billion years ago or does he subscribe to a different theory?

— MP Bruce Hyer

=== Imagine Adoption bankruptcy ===
Goodyear and his wife Valerie are co-owners of Constant Energy Inc. Constant Energy is a creditor in the bankruptcy of Imagine Adoption. Constant Energy's total outstanding claim at $96,000 is the first entry on the list of preferred creditors for wages/rent/etc. TheStar also reported on the issue. Valerie was also an employee of Imagine Adoption. In April 2011 the agency's founder and its general manager were charged with breach of trust and multiple counts of fraud. As of April 2012 the case has not yet gone before the courts.

== Electoral record ==
2015 Canadian federal election: Cambridge
Party	Candidate	Votes	%	±%	Expenditures
Liberal	Bryan May	23,024	43.17	+27.72	$57,941.86
Conservative	Gary Goodyear	20,613	38.65	-14.10	$73,286.38
New Democratic	Bobbi Stewart	7,397	13.87	-14.04	$10,151.06
Green	Michele Braniff	1,723	3.23	-0.37	$1,074.94
Independent	Lee Sperduti	474	0.89	–	$9,550.00
Marxist–Leninist	Manuel Couto	108	0.20		–
Total valid votes/expense limit		53,339	100.00		$219,622.08
Total rejected ballots		227	0.42	–	
Turnout		53,566	64.60	–	
Eligible voters		82,916			
Liberal gain from Conservative		Swing		+20.91	
Source: Elections Canada

2011 Canadian federal election: Cambridge
Party	Candidate	Votes	%	±%	Expenditures
Conservative	Gary Goodyear	29,394	53.40	+4.78	$86,966.51
New Democratic	Susan Galvao	15,238	27.68	+8.07	$13,379.43
Liberal	Bryan May	8,285	15.05	-8.34	$26,622.63
Green	Jacques Malette	1,978	3.59	-4.76	$440.18
Marxist–Leninist	Manuel Couto	153	0.28	–	none listed
Total valid votes/expense limit		55,048	100.00	$96,491.18	
Total rejected ballots		255	0.46	+0.04	
Turnout		55,303	59.25	+3.33	
Eligible voters		93,335	–	–	

2008 Canadian federal election: Cambridge
Party	Candidate	Votes	%	±%	Expenditures
Conservative	Gary Goodyear	24,895	48.62	+4.78	$83,772
Liberal	Gord Zeilstra	11,977	23.39	-10.21	$8,316
New Democratic	Max Lombardi	10,044	19.61	+2.67	$12,035
Green	Scott Cosman	4,279	8.35	+3.13	$1,614
Total valid votes/expense limit		51,195	100.00	$93,018	
Total rejected ballots		217	0.42	+0.06	
Turnout		51,412	55.92	-9.05	

2006 Canadian federal election: Cambridge
Party	Candidate	Votes	%	±%
Conservative	Gary Goodyear	25,337	43.84	+5.9
Liberal	Janko Peric	19,419	33.60	−3.1
New Democratic	Donna Reid	9,794	16.94	−3.3
Green	Gareth White	3,017	5.22	+0.2
Canadian Action	David Pelly	217	0.37	
Total valid votes		57,784	100.00	
Total rejected ballots		207	0.36	
Turnout		57,991	64.97	

2004 Canadian federal election: Cambridge
Party	Candidate	Votes
Conservative	Gary Goodyear	19,123
Liberal	Janko Peric	18,899
New Democratic	Gary Price	10,392
Green	Gareth White	2,506
Christian Heritage	John Gots	395
Independent	John Oprea	134
Independent	Alec Gryc	114
Total valid votes
Total rejected ballots
Turnout
Electors on lists

== See also ==
- List of University of Waterloo people

== Citations ==
28th Canadian Ministry (2006–2015) – Cabinet of Stephen Harper
Cabinet post (1)
Predecessor	Office	Successor
new position	Minister of State (Science); 2008–2013	Greg Rickford
