= Janko Peric =

Canadian politician (born 1949)

Janko Perić

Member of Parliament for Cambridge
- In office October 25, 1993 – June 28, 2004
- Preceded by: Pat Sobeski
- Succeeded by: Gary Goodyear

Personal details
- Born: February 24, 1949 (age 76); Orehovica, Croatia
- Political party: Liberal Party
- Profession: welder,

Janko Perić (born February 24, 1949), is a former Canadian politician. Perić was the Liberal Party MP for the riding of Cambridge from 1993 to 2004.

He was born in Orehovica near Bedekovčina, Croatia and was a welder.

Perić was defeated in the 2004 federal election by Gary Goodyear of the Conservative Party, with a margin of 224 votes. Perić tried to win his seat back in the 2006 federal election, but lost by almost 6000 votes.

== Electoral record ==
2006 Canadian federal election: Cambridge
Party	Candidate	Votes	%	±%
Conservative	Gary Goodyear	25,337	43.84	+5.9
Liberal	Janko Peric	19,419	33.60	−3.1
New Democratic	Donna Reid	9,794	16.94	−3.3
Green	Gareth White	3,017	5.22	+0.2
Canadian Action	David Pelly	217	0.37	
Total valid votes		57,784	100.00	
Total rejected ballots		207	0.36	
Turnout		57,991	64.97	

2004 Canadian federal election: Cambridge
Party	Candidate	Votes
Conservative	Gary Goodyear	19,123
Liberal	Janko Peric	18,899
New Democratic	Gary Price	10,392
Green	Gareth White	2,506
Christian Heritage	John Gots	395
Independent	John Oprea	134
Independent	Alec Gryc	114
Total valid votes
Total rejected ballots
Turnout
Electors on lists

2000 Canadian federal election: Cambridge
Party	Candidate	Votes	%	±%
Liberal	Janko Peric	22,148	46.6	+9.9
Alliance	Reg Petersen	14,915	31.4	+9.0
Progressive Conservative	John Housser	5,988	12.6	-6.7
New Democratic	Pam Wolf	4,111	8.6	-11.8
Natural Law	Thomas Mitchell	210	0.4	
Independent	John Gots	160	0.3	
Total valid votes		47,532	100.0	

Note: Canadian Alliance vote is compared to the Reform vote in 1997 election.

1997 Canadian federal election: Cambridge
Party	Candidate	Votes	%	±%	Expenditures
Liberal	Janko Peric	17,673	36.74	−2.52	$47,605
Reform	Bill Donaldson	10,767	22.38	−11.15	$57,325
New Democratic	Mike Farnan	9,813	20.40	+15.11	$53,588
Progressive Conservative	Larry Olney	9,299	19.33	+1.99	$48,139
Independent	John H. Long	311	0.65		$0
Independent	Jim Remnant	237	0.49		$0
Total valid votes		48,100	100.00		
Total rejected ballots		254			
Turnout		48,354	64.77	−1.75	
Electors on the lists		74,659			
Percentage change figures are factored for redistribution.
Sources: Official Results, Elections Canada and Financial Returns, Elections Canada.

1993 Canadian federal election: Cambridge
Party	Candidate	Votes	%	±%
Liberal	Janko Peric	21,997	39.1	+12.3
Reform	Reg Petersen	18,932	33.7	
Progressive Conservative	Pat Sobeski	9,776	17.4	-23.0
New Democratic	Bill McBain	2,962	5.3	-22.8
National	Ron Cooper	1,804	3.2	
Christian Heritage	Michael Picard	407	0.7	-3.8
Natural Law	Thomas Mitchell	370	0.7	
Total valid votes		56,248	100.0	
