= Solar and Sustainable Energy Society of Canada =

The Solar and Sustainable Energy Society of Canada Inc. (SESCI) is a Canadian non-profit organization whose purpose is to advance the causes of solar energy and sustainable energy in Canada.

The organization was founded in 1974 as the Solar Energy Society of Canada. It is a member of the International Solar Energy Society.
