= Canada Fund for Africa =

The Canada Fund for Africa (CFA) was a program operated by the government of Canada through the Canadian International Development Agency (CIDA). Established in June 2002 with a budget of five hundred million dollars, its stated purpose was to support the G8 Africa Action Plan in response to priorities established in the New Partnership for Africa's Development (NEPAD). The fund officially ended on March 31, 2008. As of 2010, all but one of its targeted projects have been completed.

The Fund was established by the Canada Fund for Africa Act in 2002 to fulfill Canada's obligations under the New Africa Initiative created be the Organization of African Unity.

Government records indicate that one million dollars of the fund was spent on public-private ventures for providing risk capital. HIV/AIDS research and development, polio eradication, and the oversight of water and sanitation each received fifty million dollars.

The fund ran from 2002 to 2007, investing in pan-African and African regional investments, with a goal to leverage additional outside financing. Major results of the CFA included the African Water Facility and NEPAD Infrastructure Project Preparation Facility. Approximately 74% of funding flowed to the agricultural, water, environmental or health categories of the fund, with the remainder flowing to governance, security, trade, infrastructure, and communications technology portfolios.

The program was complemented by the Canada Investment Fund for Africa, which instead of funding government projects, funded private investment in Africa. The United Nations notes that funding under these two programs supported many initiatives, with those most likely to be supported by the Canada Fund for Africa being $220 million on polio and HIV, and $150 million on humanitarian food aid and water resources. It is not guaranteed that all these programs were funded directly by the CFA, and may include Canada Investment Fund for Africa contributions or leveraged contributions.
