= Communist Party of Canada (Marxist–Leninist) candidates in the 2008 Canadian federal election =

The Communist Party of Canada (Marxist-Leninist) fielded fifty-nine candidates in the 2008 Canadian federal election, none of whom were elected. Information about these candidates may be found on this page.

== Quebec ==
=== Hull—Aylmer: Gabriel Girard-Bernier ===
Gabriel Girard-Bernier is a perennial candidate for the Marxist-Leninist Party. He received 121 votes (0.23%), finishing sixth against Liberal incumbent Marcel Proulx.

== Ontario ==
=== Guelph: Manuel Couto ===
Manuel Couto has been a Marxist-Leninist Party candidate in four federal elections. He joined the party while attending the University of Guelph in 1980 and has said that he did so to defend the right to education and oppose the threat of war. A resident of Toronto, he does not appear to have participated in candidates' debates in 2004, 2006, or 2008. He has described himself at different times as an industrial worker, a small business person, and self-employed. He is married to Elaine Couto, who is also a perennial candidate for the party.

Electoral record
Election	Division	Party	Votes	%	Place	Winner
2000 federal	Guelph–Wellington	Marxist-Leninist	68	0.12	8/8	Brenda Chamberlain, Liberal
2004 federal	Guelph	Marxist-Leninist	66	0.13	7/7	Brenda Chamberlain, Liberal
2006 federal	Guelph	Marxist-Leninist	45	0.07	7/7	Brenda Chamberlain, Liberal
2008 federal	Guelph	Marxist-Leninist	29	0.05	10/10	Frank Valeriote, Liberal

=== Ottawa Centre: Pierre Soublière ===
Pierre Soublière is a perennial candidate for the Marxist-Leninist Party. He received 95 votes (0.15%) in 2008, finishing sixth against New Democratic Party incumbent Paul Dewar.

=== Peterborough: Elaine Couto ===
Elaine Couto was born in Bruce County, Ontario, and became active with the Marxist-Leninist Party while attending university. In this time, she called for Canada to withdraw from the North Atlantic Treaty Organization (NATO) and the North American Aerospace Defence Command (NORAD). She worked on the New Hamilton Weekly journal in the early 1990s with fellow party member Rolf Gerstenberger, and has been a receptionist and sales manager. She has also written for TML Daily, the online newspaper of the Marxist-Leninist Party. In 2008, she described herself as self-employed.

Couto is a perennial candidate. She first sought election to public office in the 1993 federal election as a candidate of the Canadian Party for Renewal, an unregistered party affiliated with the Marxist-Leninist Party. In every federal election since then, she has campaigned as an official Marxist-Leninist candidate. She also ran in the 1999 provincial election, appearing on the ballot as an independent candidate since the Marxist-Leninists are not registered at the provincial level.

Couto lived in Toronto in 2008 and said that she chose to run in Peterborough because it was a city with many working people. She said that her party was focused on reforming Canada's political system in ways that would empower the people.

She is married to Manuel Couto, who is also a perennial candidate for the Marxist-Leninist Party.

Electoral record
Election	Division	Party	Votes	%	Place	Winner
1993 federal	Hamilton West	N/A (Renewal)	134	0.35	7/7	Stan Keyes, Liberal
1997 federal	Guelph–Wellington	Marxist-Leninist	146	0.28	7/7	Brenda Chamberlain, Liberal
1999 provincial	Etobicoke Centre	Ind. (Marxist-Leninist)	209	0.44	7/7	Chris Stockwell, Progressive Conservative
2000 federal	St. Catharines	Marxist-Leninist	93	0.20	7/7	Walt Lastewka, Liberal
2004 federal	St. Catharines	Marxist-Leninist	61	0.12	7/7	Walt Lastewka, Liberal
2006 federal	St. Catharines	Marxist-Leninist	101	0.17	6/6	Rick Dykstra, Conservative
2008 federal	Peterborough	Marxist-Leninist	98	0.17	5/5	Dean Del Mastro, Conservative
