= Jean Blaquière =

Canadian politician

Jean Blaquière, a Pentecostal pastor, was a candidate for the Christian Heritage Party of Canada in the Canadian federal election of 1993, and won the party leadership in March 1994 at a Vancouver convention, in a race with two other contenders.

Blaquière chose to step down at the next convention in November 1995 in London, Ontario, and was succeeded by Ron Gray.

== Electoral record ==
Electoral record
Election	Division	Party	Votes	%	Place	Winner
1993 federal	Vercheres	CHP	476	0.8%	5/6	Stephane Bergeron Bloc Québécois
February 1995 byelection	Brome--Missisquoi	CHP	126	0.3%	6/10	Denis Paradis Liberal

Preceded by Heather Stilwell	Christian Heritage Party of Canada leaders 1994-1995	Succeeded by Ron Gray
