= List of Université du Québec à Montréal people =

The following list of Université du Québec à Montréal people includes notable administrators, alumni and faculty of Université du Québec à Montréal.

== Rectors ==
The following is a list of rectors of Université du Québec à Montréal.

Rectors of Université du Québec à Montréal
Name	Term start	Term end
Léo A. Dorais	1969	1974
Maurice Brossard	1974	1977
Claude Pichette	1977	1986
Pierre Brossard (interim)	1986	1986
Claude Corbo	1986	1996
Gilbert Dionne (interim)	1996	1996
Paule Leduc	1996	2000
Gilbert Dionne (interim)	2000	2001
Roch Denis	2001	2006
Danielle Laberge (interim)	2006	2008
Claude Corbo	2008	2013
Robert Proulx	2013	2018
Magda Fusaro	2018	present

== Notable faculty ==
- François Barbeau
- Francine Descarries
- Andrée-Anne Dupuis-Bourret
- Jingjing Liang
- Karen Messing

== Notable alumni ==
=== A ===
- David Altmejd
- Nelly Arcan
- Maxime Arseneau
- François Avard
- Paulina Ayala

=== B ===
- Misstress Barbara
- Manon Barbeau
- Marie-France Bazzo
- Steven Bednarski
- Louis Bélanger
- Germain Belzile
- Stéphane Bergeron
- Daniel Bernard
- Maxime Bernier
- Sylvie Bernier
- Guy Berthiaume
- Marguerite Blais
- Steven Blaney
- Valérie Blass
- Diana Boulay
- Pierre Breton
- Pierre-Luc Brillant

=== C ===
- Martin Camirand
- Bonnie Campbell
- Guy Caron
- Jocelyne Caron
- Benoit Charette
- Denis Chouinard
- Christy Chung
- Marie Cinq-Mars
- Philippe Comtois
- Jacques Cossette-Trudel
- Jacques Côté
- Claude Cousineau
- François Croteau

=== D ===
- Michel de Broin
- François Desrochers
- Ann Dow
- Patrick Doyon
- Emmanuel Dubourg
- Maryse Dubuc
- Benoît Dutrizac

=== F ===
- Joseph Facal
- Luc Ferrandez
- Raymonde Folco

=== G ===
- Ying Gao
- Elodie Ghedin
- Marie Gibeau
- Alain Giguère
- Greg N. Gregoriou

=== H ===
- Émilie Heymans
- Denise Ho (dropped out)

=== I ===
- Mustapha Ishak-Boushaki

=== J ===
- Marlene Jennings
- Peter Julian

=== L ===
- Arthur Lamothe
- Louise Lanctôt
- Christian Langlois
- Daniel Langlois
- Éric Laporte
- Jean-Claude Lauzon
- Jeanne Leblanc
- Josée Legault
- Guy Lelièvre
- Martin Lemay
- Guy A. Lepage
- Marquise Lepage

=== M ===
- Pierre Marsan
- Liliane Massala
- Scott McKay
- Ariane Moffatt
- Sylvie Moreau
- Marie-Claude Morin

=== N ===
- Janice Nadeau
- Louise Nadeau
- Indira Nair

=== P ===
- Daniel Paillé
- Marc Parent
- Pierre Karl Péladeau
- Bryan Perro
- Luc Picard
- Patrick Pichette
- Carole Poirier
- Léa Pool
- Sébastien Proulx

=== R ===
- André Ristic
- Gilles Robert
- Régine Robin

=== S ===
- Romeo Saganash
- Jean-Claude St-André
- Caroline St-Hilaire
- Ken Scott
- Jean-François Simard
- Jennifer Stoddart
- Hugues Sweeney

=== T ===
- Shelley Tepperman
- Tony Tomassi

=== U ===
- Marie Uguay

=== V ===
- Jean-Marc Vallée
- Michel Venne
- Antoine Vézina
- Yolande Villemaire
- Martin Villeneuve

=== W ===
- Laure Waridel
