= 2009 Longueuil municipal election =

← 2005	2 November 2009	2013 →

26 seats in Longueuil City Council
- Turnout: 38.9%
	First party	Second party
Leader	Caroline St-Hilaire	Jacques Goyette
Party	Action Longueuil	Parti municipal de Longueuil
Leader since	2009	2009
Last election	pre-creation	19 seats, 64.2%
Seats won	11	15
Seat change	-	-4
Popular vote	34,291	30,504
Percentage	52.9%	47.1%
Mayor before election
Claude Gladu
Parti municipal de Longueuil
Elected mayor
Caroline St-Hilaire
Action Longueuil

The 2009 Longueuil municipal election took place on November 1, 2009, to elect a mayor and city councillors in Longueuil, Quebec, Canada.

Caroline St-Hilaire was elected to her first term as mayor, and her party won 11 of the 26 seats on Longueuil City Council.

== Results ==
=== Mayor ===
Mayor of Longueuil
Candidate	Party	Vote	%
Caroline St-Hilaire	Action Longueuil	34,291	52.9%
Jacques Goyette	Parti municipal de Longueuil	30,504	47.1%
Total valid votes		64,795	100%
Rejected ballots		1,892	

=== Councillors ===
==== Vieux-Longueuil ====
District 1
Candidate	Party	Vote	%
Michel Desjardins (X)	Parti municipal Longueuil	1,482	57.4%
Marc Lachance	Action Longueuil	1,102	42.6%
Total valid votes		2,584	100%

District 2
Candidate	Party	Vote	%
Sylvie Parent	Action Longueuil	2,048	55.2%
Simon Crochetière	Parti municipal Longueuil	1,662	44.8%
Total valid votes		3,710	100%

District 3
Candidate	Party	Vote	%
Benoît L'Écuyer	Parti municipal Longueuil	1,738	55.5%
Luc J. Lachapelle	Action Longueuil	1,393	44.5%
Total valid votes		3,131	100%

District 4
Candidate	Party	Vote	%
André Groleau	Parti municipal Longueuil	1,915	53.1%
Marc Ostiguy	Action Longueuil	1,693	46.9%
Total valid votes		3,608	100%

District 5
Candidate	Party	Vote	%
Albert Beaudry	Action Longueuil	1,436	50.2%
Denise Picard	Parti municipal Longueuil	1,422	49.8%
Total valid votes		2,858	100%

District 6
Candidate	Party	Vote	%
Michel Lanctôt	Action Longueuil	1,172	51.4%
Alain St-Pierre (X)	Parti municipal Longueuil	1,107	48.6%
Total valid votes		2,279	100%

District 7
Candidate	Party	Vote	%
Marie-Lise Sauvé (X)	Parti municipal Longueuil	1,328	55.5%
Simon-Robert Chartrand	Action Longueuil	1,066	44.5%
Total valid votes		2,394	100%

District 8
Candidate	Party	Vote	%
Manon D. Hénault (X)	Parti municipal Longueuil	1,472	58.3%
Marc Archambault	Action Longueuil	1,053	41.7%
Total valid votes		2,525	100%

District 9
Candidate	Party	Vote	%
Nicole Lafontaine (X)	Parti municipal Longueuil	1,390	65.2%
Anaka Félicien Amon	Action Longueuil	741	34.8%
Total valid votes		2,131	100%

District 10
Candidate	Party	Vote	%
Claude Gladu Jr.	Parti municipal Longueuil	983	44.7%
Tommy Théberge	Action Longueuil	678	30.9%
Réal Chevalier	Independent	536	24.4%
Total valid votes		2,197	100%

District 11
Candidate	Party	Vote	%
Johane Fontaine (X)	Parti municipal Longueuil	1,060	57.4%
Jacinthe Jean	Action Longueuil	787	42.6%
Total valid votes		1,847	100%

District 12
Candidate	Party	Vote	%
Monique Bastien	Action Longueuil	1,450	50%
Normand Caisse (X)	Parti municipal Longueuil	1,448	50%
Total valid votes		2,898	100%

District 13
Candidate	Party	Vote	%
Monique Brisson	Action Longueuil	1,537	52.8%
Gilbert Côté (X)	Parti municipal Longueuil	1,376	47.2%
Total valid votes		2,913	100%

District 14
Candidate	Party	Vote	%
Robert Gladu (X)	Parti municipal Longueuil	1,677	64.7%
Mathieu Jeanneau	Action Longueuil	914	35.3%
Total valid votes		2,591	100%

District 15
Candidate	Party	Vote	%
Gilles Grégoire (X)	Parti municipal Longueuil	1,080	66.6%
Anouk Hébert	Action Longueuil	542	33.4%
Total valid votes		1,622	100%

==== Greenfield Park ====
District 16
Candidate	Party	Vote	%
Mireille Carrière (X)	Parti municipal Longueuil	1,005	52.5%
Jason Matuzewiski	Action Longueuil	909	47.5%
Total valid votes		1,914	100%

District 17
Candidate	Party	Vote	%
Robert Myles (X)	Parti municipal Longueuil	932	64.5%
Richard Morisset	Action Longueuil	512	35.5%
Total valid votes		1,444	100%

District 18
Candidate	Party	Vote	%
Michael O'Grady	Action Longueuil	978	60.1%
Bernard Constantini (X)	Parti municipal Longueuil	650	39.9%
Total valid votes		1,628	100%

==== Saint-Hubert ====
District 19
Candidate	Party	Vote	%
Jacques Lemire (X)	Parti municipal Longueuil	1,740	78.4%
Henriette Lemire	Action Longueuil	479	21.6%
Total valid votes		2,219	100%

District 20
Candidate	Party	Vote	%
Roger Roy (X)	Parti municipal Longueuil	1,930	71.1%
Nancy Martel	Action Longueuil	783	28.9%
Total valid votes		2,713	100%

District 21
Candidate	Party	Vote	%
Jacques E. Poitras (X)	Parti municipal Longueuil	1,647	57.7%
Michèle Ouimet	Action Longueuil	1,205	42.3%
Total valid votes		2,852	100%

District 22
Candidate	Party	Vote	%
Éric Beaulieu	Action Longueuil	1,366	55.7%
Lise Bélisle-Dutil (X)	Parti municipal Longueuil	1,085	44.3%
Total valid votes		2,451	100%

District 23
Candidate	Party	Vote	%
Suzanne Lachance	Action Longueuil	1,284	50.1%
Stéphane Desjardins (X)	Parti municipal Longueuil	1,281	49.9%
Total valid votes		2,565	100%

District 24
Candidate	Party	Vote	%
Suzanne Charbonneau (X)	Action Longueuil	1,633	66.3%
Jean-Claude Lévesque	Parti municipal Longueuil	830	33.7%
Total valid votes		2,463	100%

District 25
Candidate	Party	Vote	%
Lorraine Guay-Boivin (X)	Action Longueuil	1,447	60.1%
Caroline Fortier	Parti municipal Longueuil	962	39.9%
Total valid votes		2,409	100%

District 26
Candidate	Party	Vote	%
Michel Latendresse (X)	Action Longueuil	1,913	64.5%
Jean Rossignol	Parti municipal Longueuil	1,052	35.5%
Total valid votes		2,965	100%
