= Stéphane Richer (disambiguation) =

Stéphane Richer (born 1966), is a Canadian ice hockey forward.

Stéphane Richer may also refer to:

- Stéphane Richer (ice hockey defenceman) (born 1966), Canadian ice hockey defenceman
- Stéphane Richer (sailor) in 470 (dinghy)
- Stephane Richer, see 2013 Longueuil municipal election
