= 2011–12 Montreal Stars season =

Professional ice hockey season

The 2011-12 season was the Montreal Stars' 5th season in the Canadian Women's Hockey League The previous year, they attempted to win their third Clarkson Cup Championship, the main championship within the league. They eventually lost 5-2 to the Boston Blades in the championship game of the series in Markham, Ontario, Canada.

With the first pick overall in the 2011 CWHL Draft, the Montreal Stars selected Meghan Agosta from Mercyhurst College.

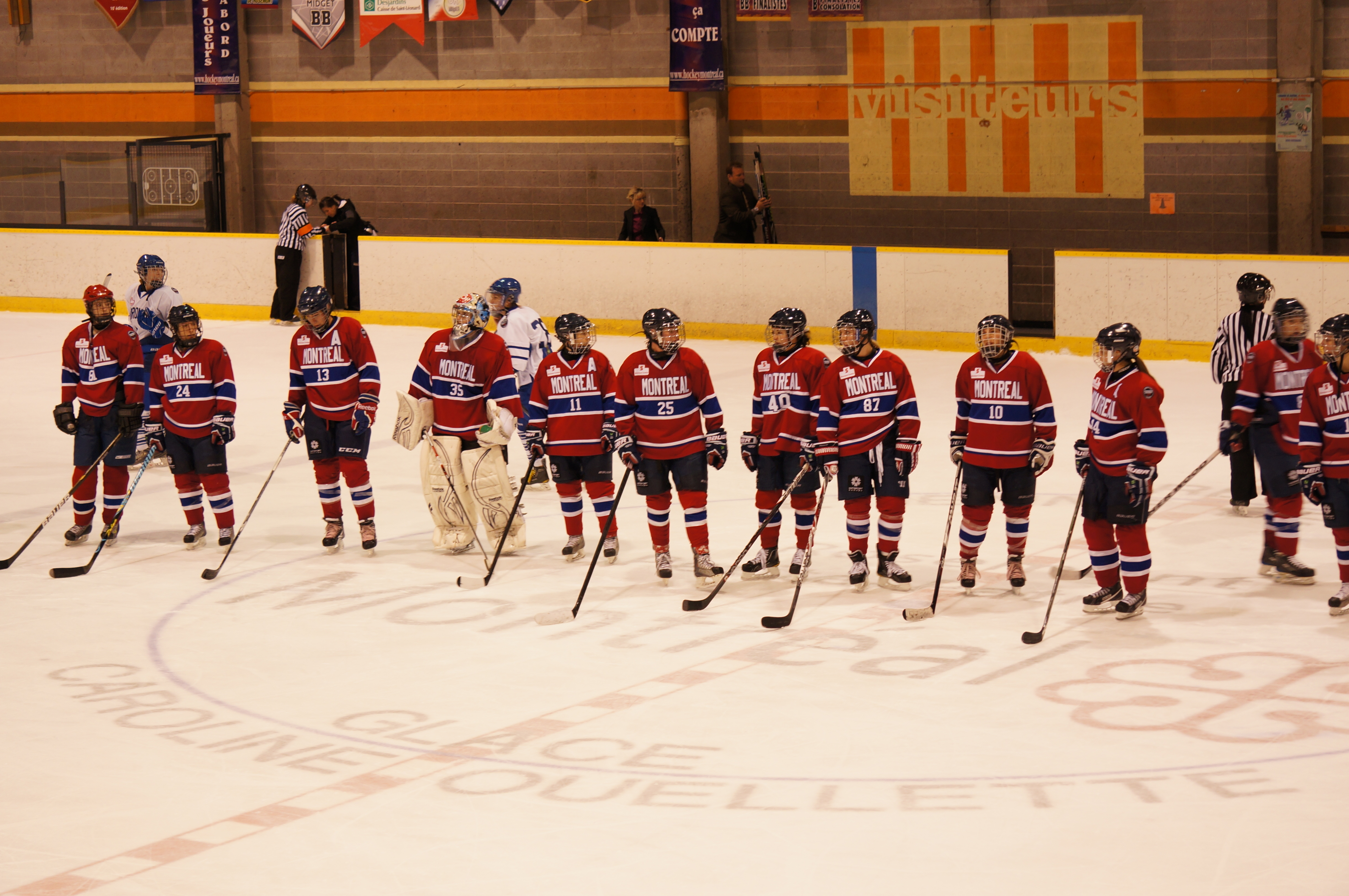
The Montreal Stars

== Offseason ==
=== CWHL Draft ===
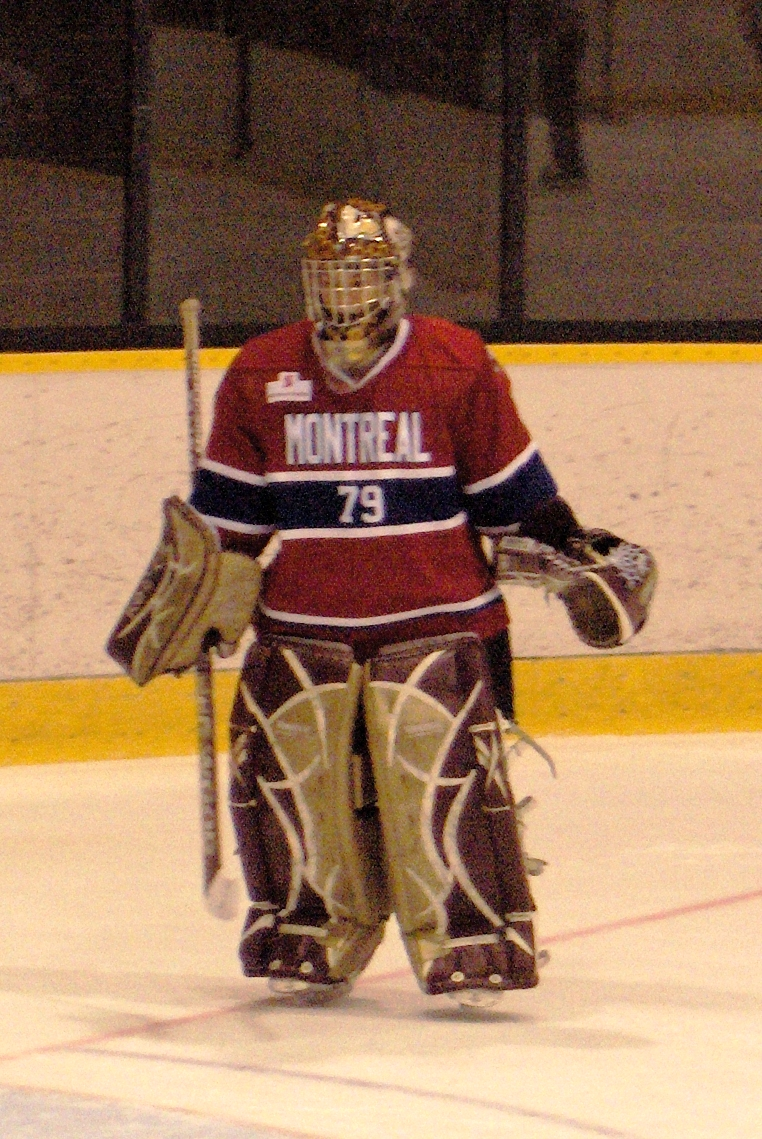
As player substitute, Audrey Doyon-Lessard

= Indicates Olympian

= Indicates former NCAA player

= Indicates former CIS player

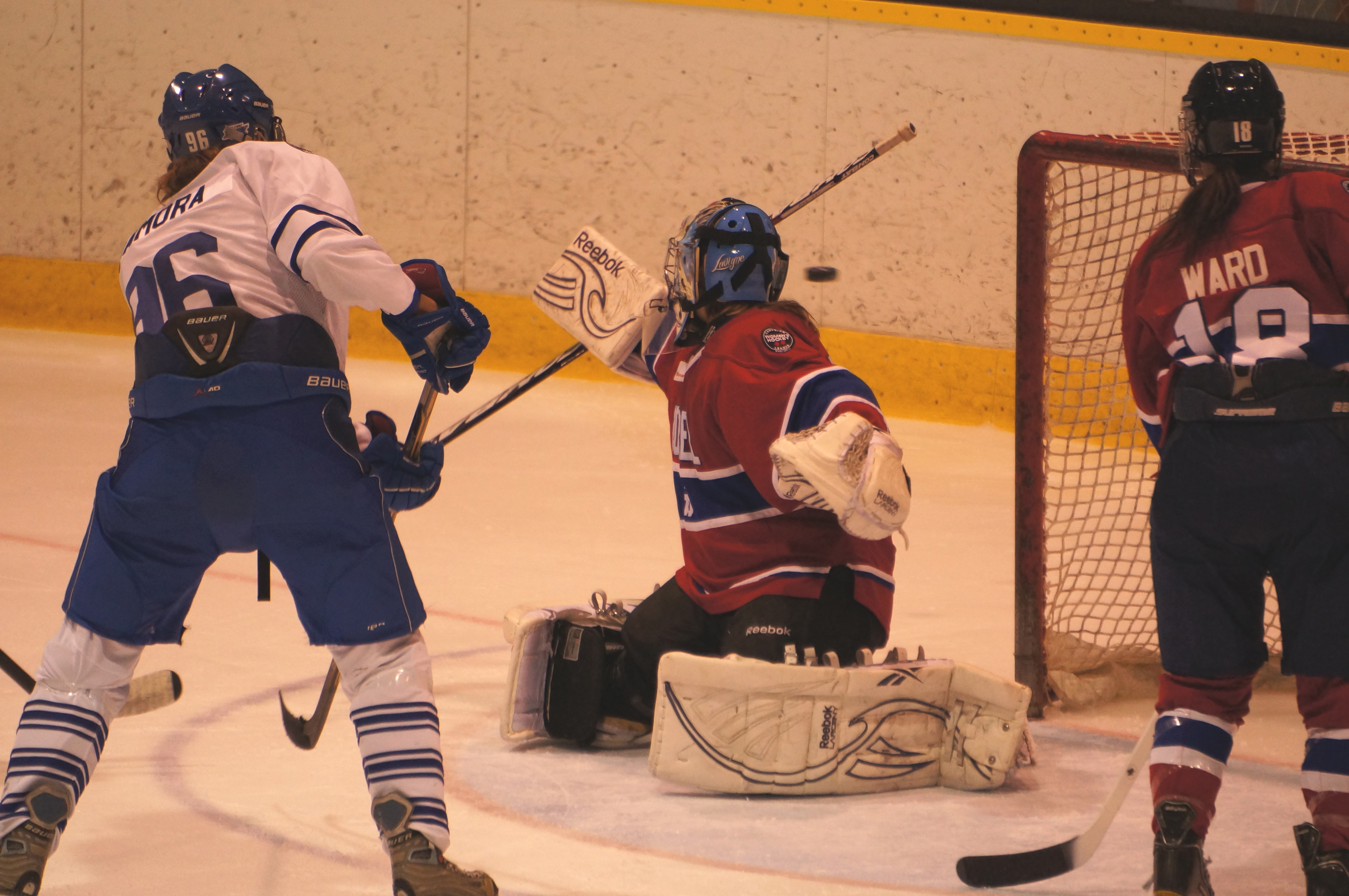
For 2011-12 season, Jenny Lavigne was the Star's regular Goaltender

#	Player	Hometown	College
1	Meghan Agosta (F)	(Canada) Ruthven, Ontario	Mercyhurst Lakers (CHA)
7	Catherine Ward (D)	(Canada) Montreal, Quebec	Boston University Terriers (HEA)
13	Caroline Hill (F)	(Canada) Dorval, Quebec	McGill Martlets (QSSF)
19	Catherine Herron (G)	(Canada) Chambly, Quebec	Montreal Carabins (QSSF)
25	Catherine Desjardins (D)	(Canada) Varennes, Quebec	Concordia Stingers (QSSF)
31	Alyssa Cecere (F)	(Canada) Brossard, Quebec	McGill Martlets (QSSF)
37	Audrey Doyon-Lessard (G)	(Canada) Charny, Quebec	Concordia Stingers (QSSF)
43	Danielle Wilkinson-Ford		None (played in DWHL)
49	Sabrine Nault		None (played for Les Ailes de Richelieu)

== Regular season ==
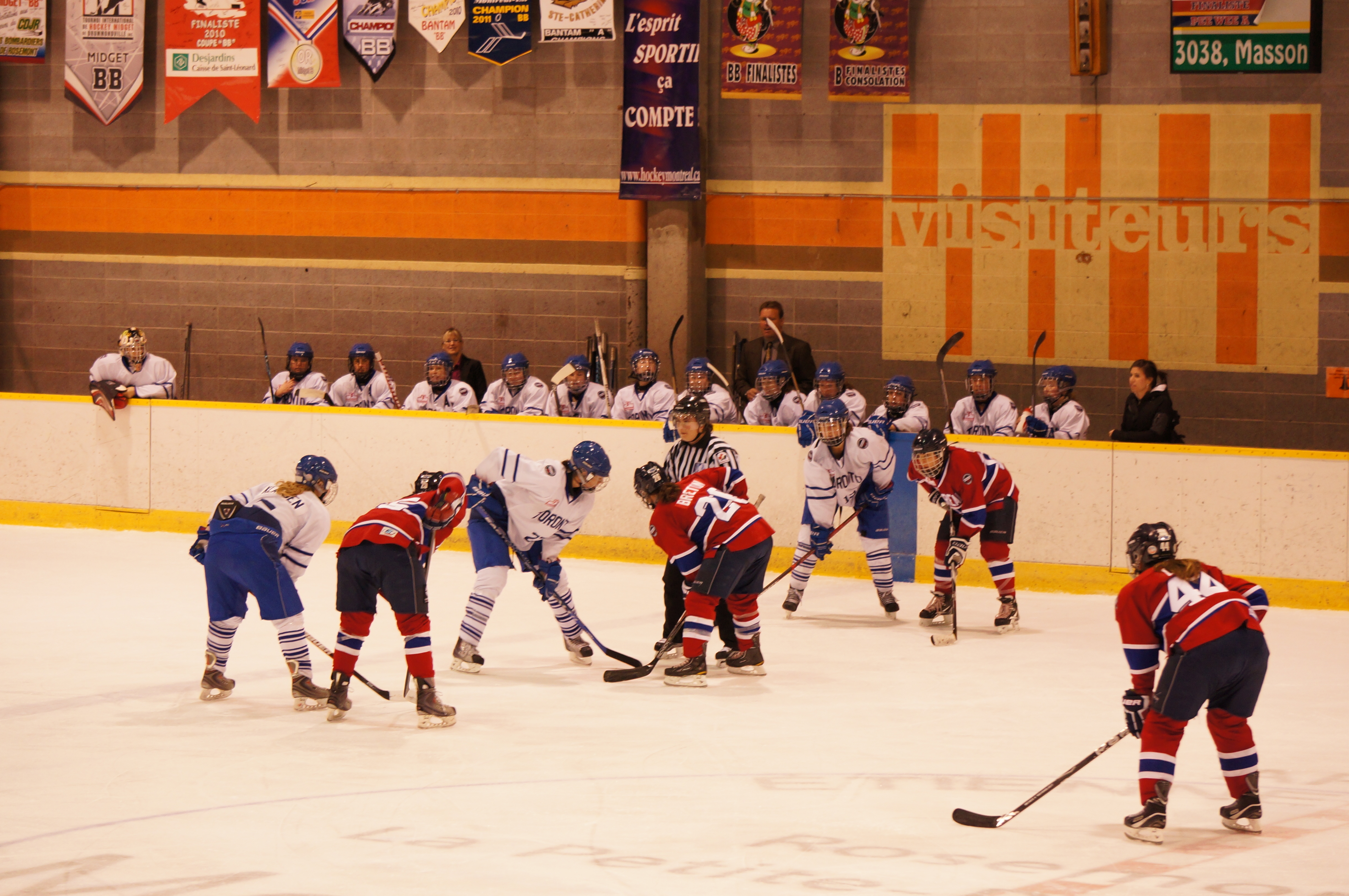
January 8: Get in the Game, Support the Stars! Fundraiser game

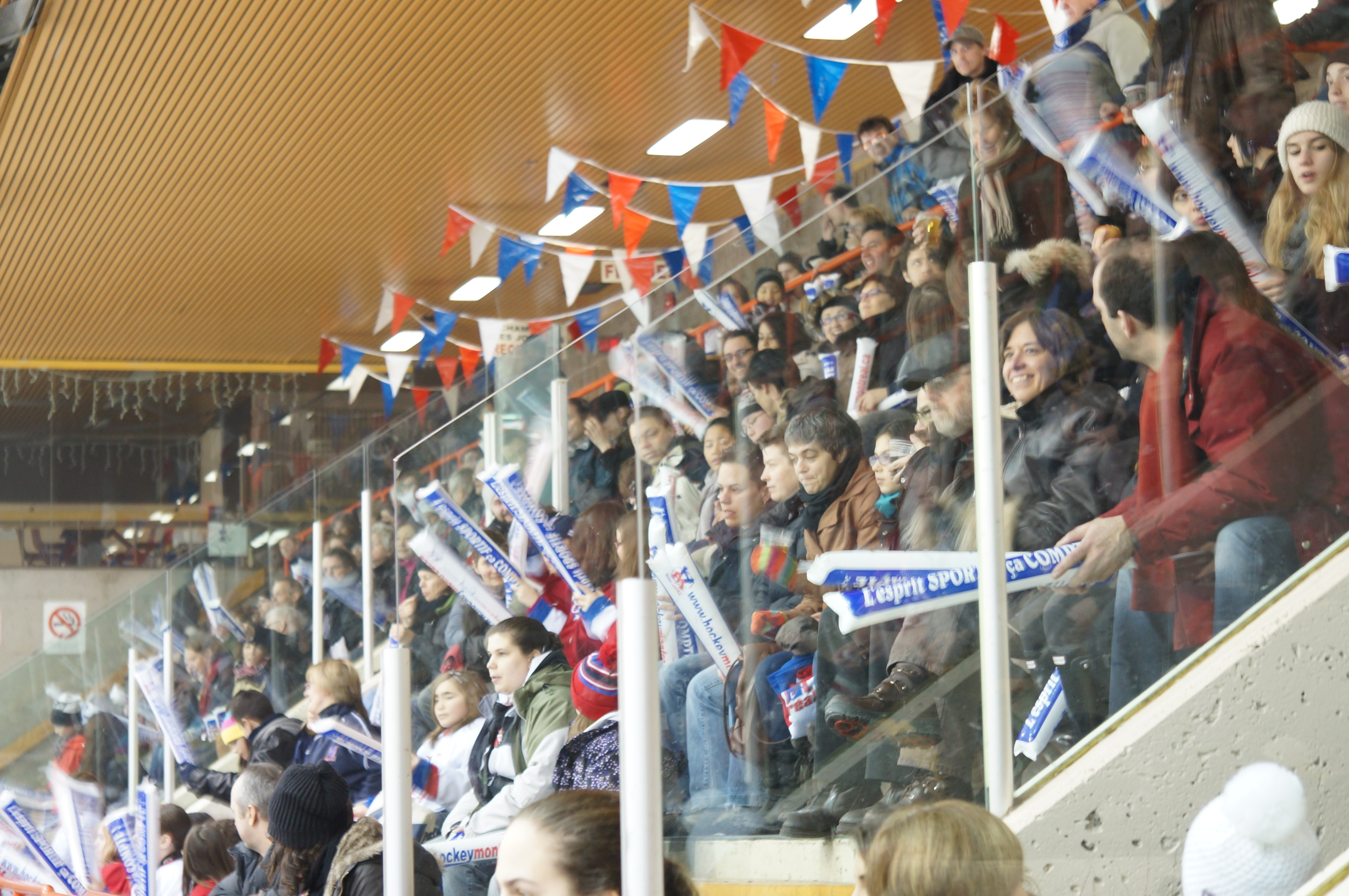
Montreal supporters at Arena St-Louis

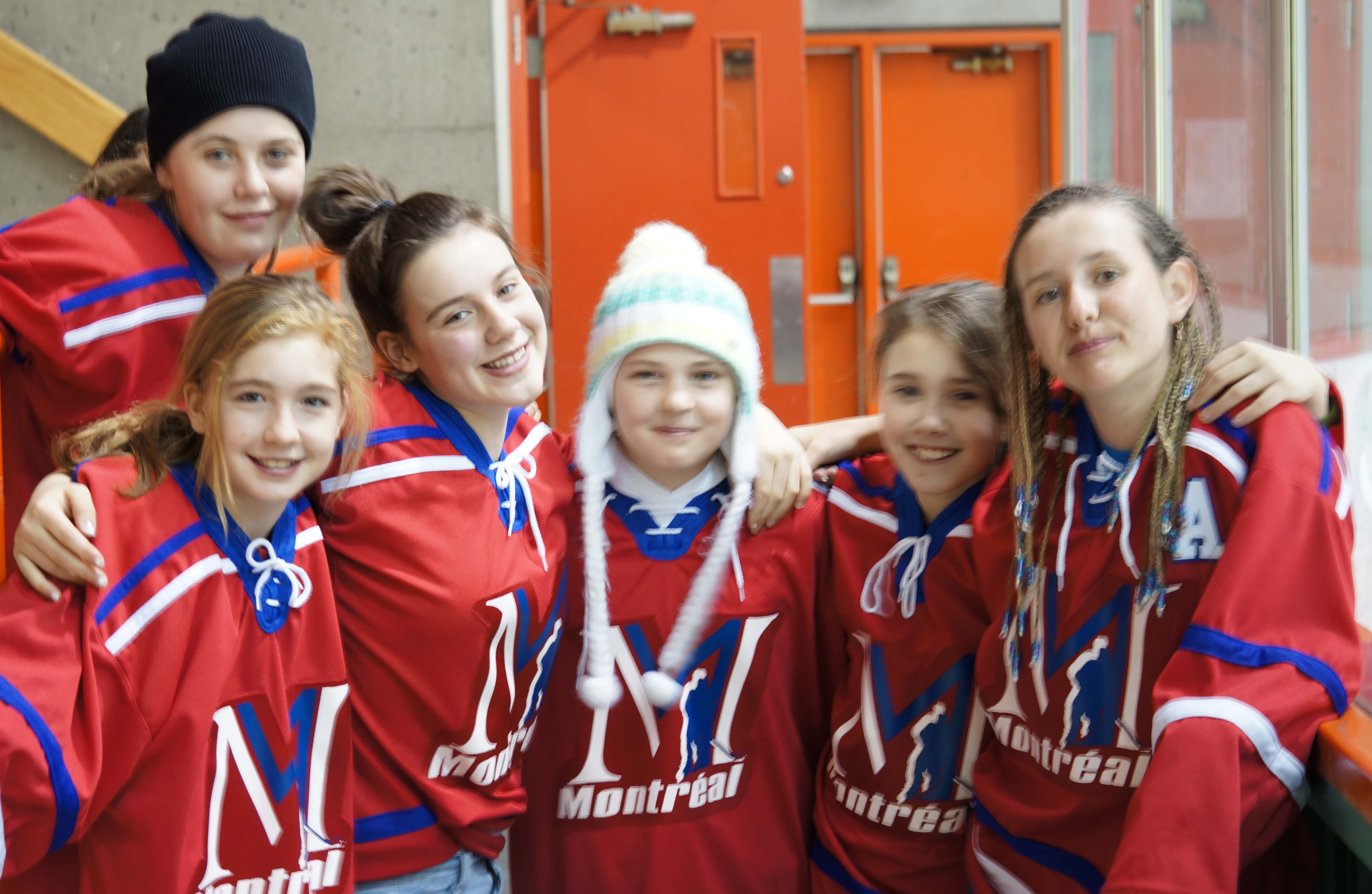
Young fans of Montreal Girls Hockey

- October 13: The CWHL participated in two charity hockey games for cancer research at Windsor Arena. The event was called 'Stick It To Cancer' and the Montreal Stars competed with the Toronto Furies in two games on Nov. 26 and 27. The campaign was organized in partnership by the CWHL, along with Breast Ride Ever, a not-for-profit organization. Proceeds from the games benefitted local cancer programs and the Hospice of Windsor and Essex County.
- November 19: the second annual "Game on to beat breast cancer" benefit. The target to surpass the previous year's donation results was exceeded. A new attendance record was also set at the game, with over 1,100 fans in the attendance.
- December 8: Montréal Stars offered a cheque for close to $15,000 to the Quebec Cancer Foundation
- January 8: Approximately 900 people came to the fundraiser game. More than $7,000 was raised during the event.
- January 20, 21 and 22: Montreal Stars played their three home games in front of young girl hockey players and fans from local communities. These games were presented in collaboration with local girls' minor hockey associations: Mont-Royal Girls Hockey Association, Montreal Girls Hockey and the Pierrefond Girls Minor Hockey. On January 20, a pre-game ceremony was held to honour the career of Catherine Ward, who grew up in and played minor hockey with Mont-Royal Girls Hockey Association.

=== Schedule at home ===
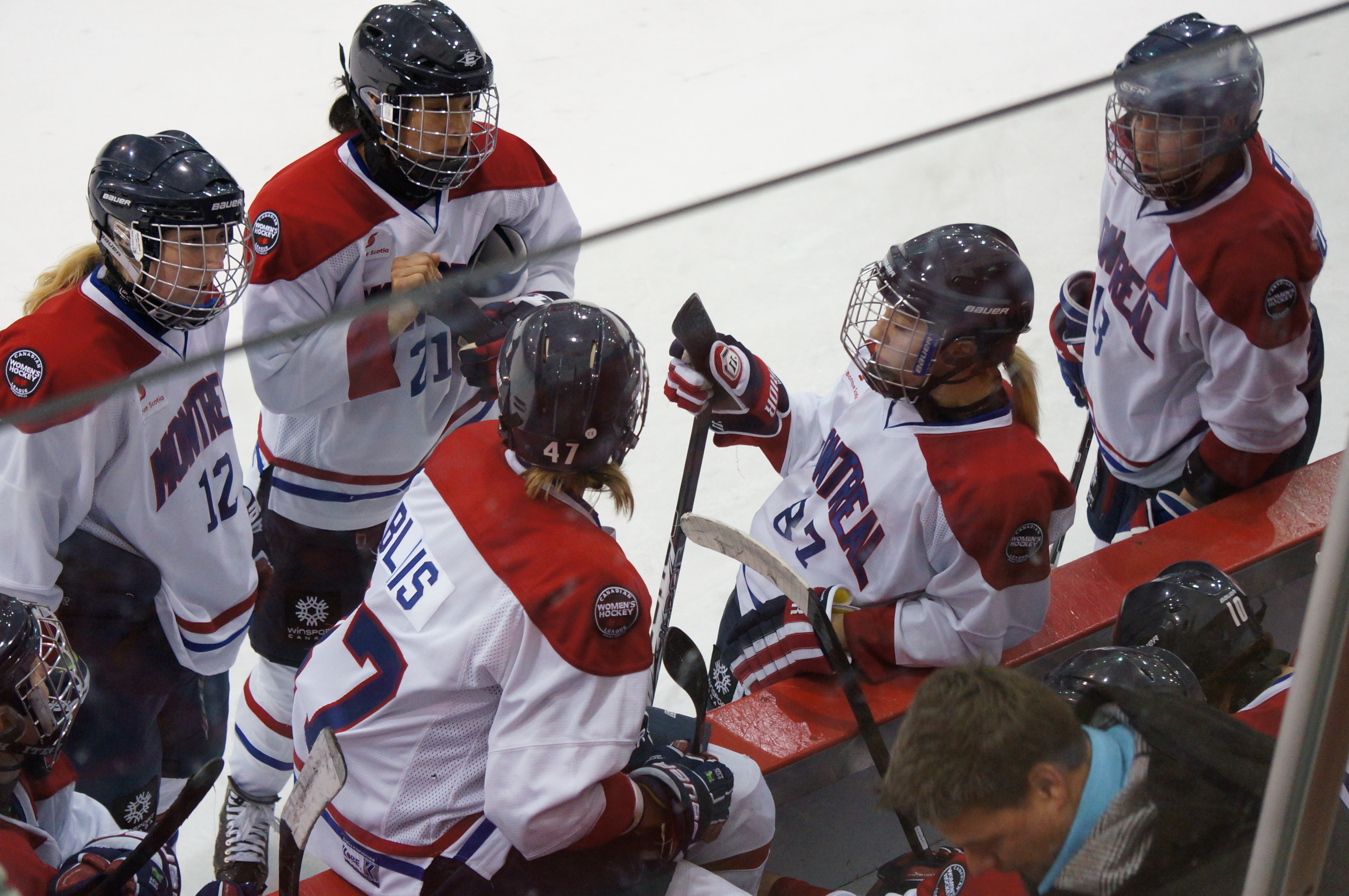
The Stars gathering around the bench discussing strategy

Date	Time	Location	Opponent	Score	Notes
Oct 22	15h00	Centre Étienne Desmarteau	Brampton Thunder	4-1	Home Opener
Oct 23	13h00	Centre Étienne Desmarteau	Brampton Thunder	7-2	
Nov 19	15h00	Centre Étienne Desmarteau	Boston Blades	2-4	Québec Breast Cancer Foundation
Nov 20	13h00	Centre Étienne Desmarteau	Boston Blades	4-1	
Dec 3	15h00	Centre Étienne Desmarteau	Burlington Barracudas	9-3	
Dec 4	13h00	Centre Étienne Desmarteau	Burlington Barracudas	7-2	
Jan 7	15h00	Centre Étienne Desmarteau	Toronto Furies	3-0	
Jan 8	13h00	Centre Étienne Desmarteau	Toronto Furies	1-3	Fundraiser game
Jan 18	19h30	McConnell Arena	McGill Martlets	4-1	Exhibition Game
Jan 20	19h00	Ville Mont-Royal Arena	Team Alberta CWHL	8-2	Minor Hockey Outreach
Jan 21	16h00	Arena St-Louis	Burlington Barracudas	6-3	Minor Hockey Outreach
Jan 22	12h15	Centre Civique de DDO Dollard-des-Ormeaux	Burlington Barracudas	10-1	Minor Hockey Outreach
Feb 17	19h30	McConnell Arena	McGill Martlets	Cancel by McGill	Exhibition Game
Feb 18	15h00	Centre Étienne Desmarteau	Toronto Furies	6-3	Fan Appreciation Day (750 supporters)
Feb 19	13h00	Centre Étienne Desmarteau	Toronto Furies	7-4	Last Home Game

== Awards and honors ==
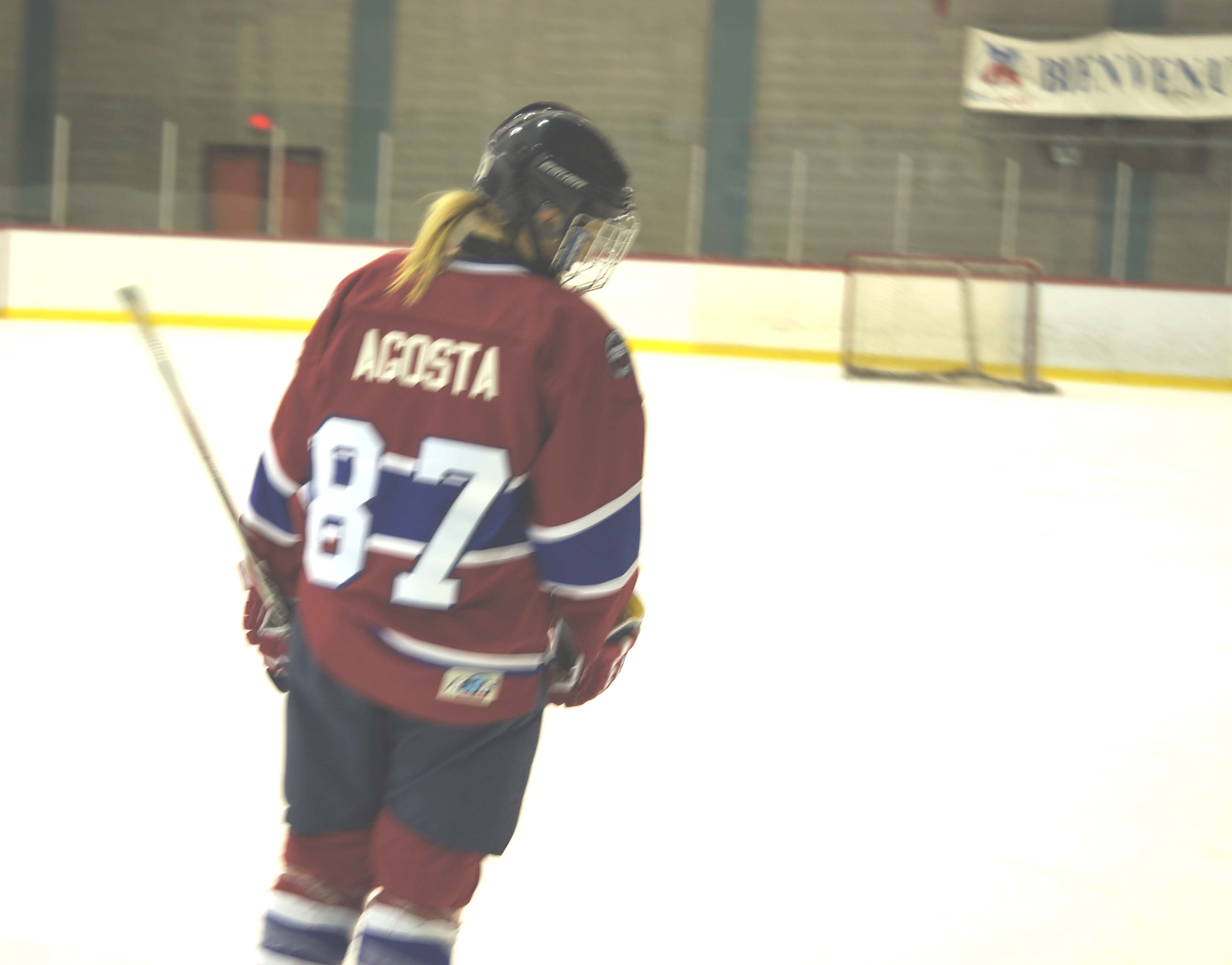
Meghan Agosta on the ice

During the 2011-2012 season, Meghan Agosta broke the single season record for points scored, surpassing the previous record of 71 points, recording 80 points with 41 goals and 39 assists in 27 games.

== See also ==
- 2010–11 Montreal Stars season
- November 19 2011 Montreal Stars beat breast cancer
