= 2013 Longueuil municipal election =

← 2009	November 3, 2013	2017 →

15 seats in Longueuil City Council
- Turnout: 34.0%
	First party	Second party
Leader	Caroline St-Hilaire	Pardo Chiocchio
Party	Action Longueuil	Independent
Leader since	2009	-
Last election	11/26	-
Seats won	13/15	-
Seat change		-
Popular vote	50,088	7,285
Percentage	87.3%	12.7%
Mayor before election
Caroline St-Hilaire
Action Longueuil
Elected mayor
Caroline St-Hilaire
Action Longueuil

The 2013 Longueuil municipal election took place on November 3, 2013, to elect a mayor and city councillors in Longueuil, Quebec, Canada. This is in conjunction with 2013 Quebec municipal elections that was held across the province on the same date.

Longueuil City Council voted to reduce the number of councillors from 26 to 15 in time for the 2013 municipal election.

== Results ==
=== Mayor ===
Party	Mayoral candidate	Vote	%
Action Longueuil	Caroline St-Hilaire (X)	50,088	87.3
Independent	Pardo Chiocchio	7,285	12.7
Total valid votes		57,373	100.0
Rejected ballots		2,153	3.6
Turnout		59,526	34.0
Registered electors		175,287	

=== Councillors ===
==== Greenfield Park ====
City Councillor, Greenfield Park
Party	Candidate	Vote	%
Option Greenfield Park	Robert Myles	2,464	51.4
Action Longueuil	Michael O'Grady	2,330	48.6

Borough Councillor 1, Greenfield Park
Party	Candidate	Vote	%
Action Longueuil	Sylvain Joly	2,069	43.1
Option Greenfield Park	Daniel Lamoureux	1,996	41.6
Independent	Jason Matuzewiski	738	15.4

Borough Councillor 2, Greenfield Park
Party	Candidate	Vote	%
Option Greenfield Park	Wade Wilson	2,403	50.5
Action Longueuil	Susan Rasmussen	2,354	49.5

==== Saint-Hubert ====
City Councillor, Iberville
Party	Candidate	Vote	%
Action Longueuil	Éric Beaulieu	2,542	61.7
Independent	Lise Dutil	765	18.6
Independent	Brian Peddar	390	9.5
Independent	Dominic Robitaille	377	9.2
Independent	Marc Joseph	45	1.1

City Councillor, Laflèche
Party	Candidate	Vote	%
Independent	Jacques Lemire	2,690	54.7
Action Longueuil	Roger Roy	2,232	45.3

City Councillor, Maraîchers
Party	Candidate	Vote	%
Action Longueuil	Lorraine Guay-Boivin	2,833	74.6
Independent	Sébastien Vaillancourt	963	25.4

City Councillor, Parc-de-la-Cité
Party	Candidate	Vote	%
Action Longueuil	Jacques E. Poitras	3,237	81.8
Independent	Maurice Carpentier	719	18.2

City Councillor, Vieux-Saint-Hubert-la Savane
Party	Candidate	Vote	%
Action Longueuil	Nathalie Boisclair	3,197	88.6
Independent	Laurent Couldiaty	410	11.4

==== Le Vieux-Longueuil ====
City Councillor, Antoinette-Robidoux
Party	Candidate	Vote	%
Action Longueuil	Michel Lanctôt	2,366	83.5
Independent	Habib Ranni	469	16.5

City Councillor, Boisé-Du Tremblay
Party	Candidate	Vote	%
Action Longueuil	Benôit L'Écuyer	3,537	84.1
Independent	Mario Tremblay	351	8.3
Independent	Pierre Cantin	318	7.6

City Councillor, Coteau-Rouge
Party	Candidate	Vote	%
Action Longueuil	Monique Bastien	2,439	49.7
Independent	Robert Gladu	1,964	40.0
Independent	Charles A. Ahoto	404	8.2
Independent	Ali Meghoufel	98	2.0

City Councillor, Explorateurs
Party	Candidate	Vote	%
Action Longueuil	Stéphane Richer	Acclaimed	

City Councillor, Fatima-Parcours-du-Cerf
Candidate	Party	Vote	%
Action Longueuil	Sylvie Parent	Acclaimed	

City Councillor, Georges-Dor
Party	Candidate	Vote	%
Action Longueuil	Xavier Léger	2,469	65.6
Independent	Marc Archambault	713	18.9
Independent	Benjamin Bourgoin	584	15.5

City Councillor, LeMoyne-Jacques-Cartier
Party	Candidate	Vote	%
Action Longueuil	Colette Éthier	1,633	48.3
Independent	Claude Jr. Gladu	972	28.7
Réal Chevalier	Independent	776	23.0

City Councillor, Parc-Michel-Chartrand
Party	Candidate	Vote	%
Action Longueuil	France Dubé	Acclaimed	

City Councillor, Saint-Charles
Party	Candidate	Vote	%
Action Longueuil	Albert Beaudry	2,964	80.6
Independent	Paul Saindon	712	19.4
