= FQC =

FQC may refer to:

- A. K. M. Fazlul Quader Chowdhury (1919–1973), Bengali politician referred to as FQC
- Fondation québécoise du cancer, French name for the Quebec Cancer Foundation
- FQC, distinct field compressed by FASTQ format compressors
- Ffarquhar Quarry Company, fictional operator for The Railway Series characters
