= 2005 Longueuil municipal election =

← 2001	6 November 2005	2009 →

26 seats in Longueuil City Council
- Turnout: 38.3%
	First party	Second party
Leader	Claude Gladu	Claude Lamoureux
Party	Parti municipal Rive-Sud	Ralliement Longueuil
Leader since	2005	2009
Last election	pre-creation	pre-creation
Seats won	19	7
Popular vote	40,384	22,502
Percentage	61.7%	34.38%
Mayor before election
Jacques Olivier
Équipe Olivier
Elected mayor
Claude Gladu
Parti municipal Rive-Sud

The 2005 Longueuil municipal election took place on November 6, 2005, to elect a mayor and city councillors in Longueuil, Quebec, Canada.

Claude Gladu was elected to his third term as mayor, and first term of the re-constituted city of Longueuil. His party won 19 of the 26 seats on Longueuil City Council.

== Results ==
=== Mayor ===
Mayor of Longueuil
Candidate	Party	Vote	%
Claude Gladu	Parti municipal Rive-Sud	40,384	64.2%
Claude Lamoureux	Ralliement Longueuil	22,502	35.8%
Total valid votes		62,886	100%

=== Councillors ===
==== Vieux-Longueuil ====
District 1
Candidate	Party	Vote	%
Michel Desjardins	Parti municipal Rive-Sud	1,835	77.2%
Karine Simard	Ralliement Longueuil	542	22.8%
Total valid votes		2,377	100%

District 2
Candidate	Party	Vote	%
Simon Crochetière	Parti municipal Rive-Sud	1,814	63.7%
Marc Lamoureux	Ralliement Longueuil	854	30.0%
Térésina David	Independent	180	6.3%
Total valid votes		2,848	100%

District 3
Candidate	Party	Vote	%
Claudette Tessier	Parti municipal Rive-Sud	1,761	66.8%
Linda Bossé	Ralliement Longueuil	877	33.2%
Total valid votes		2,638	100%

District 4
Candidate	Party	Vote	%
Jacques Goyette	Parti municipal Rive-Sud	1,736	64.0%
Marc Lachance	Ralliement Longueuil	977	36.0%
Total valid votes		2,713	100%

District 5
Candidate	Party	Vote	%
Robert Charland	Parti municipal Rive-Sud	1,278	63.7%
Vincent Gagné	Ralliement Longueuil	727	36.3%
Total valid votes		2,005	100%

District 6
Candidate	Party	Vote	%
Bertrand Girard	Parti municipal Rive-Sud	1,455	79.6%
France Prévost	Ralliement Longueuil	373	20.4%
Total valid votes		1,828	100%

District 7
Candidate	Party	Vote	%
Marie-Lise Sauvé	Parti municipal Rive-Sud	1,596	79.8%
Juliette Proulx	Ralliement Longueuil	403	20.2%
Total valid votes		1,999	100%

District 8
Candidate	Party	Vote	%
Manon D. Hénault	Parti municipal Rive-Sud	2,090	81.7%
Thamarr St-Armand	Ralliement Longueuil	467	18.3%
Total valid votes		2,557	100%

District 9
Candidate	Party	Vote	%
Nicole Lafontaine	Parti municipal Rive-Sud	1,888	69.3%
Pierre Brodeur	Ralliement Longueuil	835	30.7%
Total valid votes		2,723	100%

District 10
Candidate	Party	Vote	%
Nicole Béliveau	Parti municipal Rive-Sud	1,430	67.3%
Isabelle Paquette	Ralliement Longueuil	560	26.4%
Kerline Joseph	Independent	135	6.4%
Total valid votes		2,125	100%

District 11
Candidate	Party	Vote	%
Johane Fontaine-Deshaies	Parti municipal Rive-Sud	1,453	66.2%
Monique Hains	Ralliement Longueuil	690	31.4%
Richard St-Onge	Independent	53	2.4%
Total valid votes		2,196	100%

District 12
Candidate	Party	Vote	%
Normand Caisse	Parti municipal Rive-Sud	1,901	66.5%
Roland Levasseur	Ralliement Longueuil	957	33.5%
Total valid votes		2,858	100%

District 13
Candidate	Party	Vote	%
Gilbert Côté	Parti municipal Longueuil	1,484	63.0%
Martin Clark	Ralliement Longueuil	872	37.0%
Total valid votes		2,356	100%

District 14
Candidate	Party	Vote	%
Robert Gladu	Parti municipal Longueuil	2,134	79.0%
Jacinthe Jean	Ralliement Longueuil	470	17.4%
Rémi Nadeau	Independent	96	3.6%
Total valid votes		2,700	100%

District 15
Candidate	Party	Vote	%
Gilles Grégoire	Parti municipal Longueuil	1,078	60.7%
Guy Talbot	Ralliement Longueuil	699	39.3%
Total valid votes		1,777	100%

==== Greenfield Park ====
District 16
Candidate	Party	Vote	%
Mireille Carrière	Parti municipal Rive-Sud	1,555	64.3%
Daniel Lamoureux	Ralliement Longueuil	865	35.7%
Total valid votes		2,420	100%

District 17
Candidate	Party	Vote	%
Robert Myles	Ralliement Longueuil	844	51.8%
Marc Duclos	Parti municipal Rive-Sud	786	48.2%
Total valid votes		1,630	100%

District 18
Candidate	Party	Vote	%
Bernard Constantini	Ralliement Longueuil	829	53.2%
Tim Matuzewiski	Parti municipal Rive-Sud	729	46.8%
Total valid votes		1,558	100%

==== Saint-Hubert ====
District 19
Candidate	Party	Vote	%
Jacques Lemire	Parti municipal Rive-Sud	1,798	81.2%
Claude Gagné	Ralliement Longueuil	415	18.8%
Total valid votes		2,213	100%

District 20
Candidate	Party	Vote	%
Roger Roy	Ralliement Longueuil	2,047	77.2%
Joanne Costo	Parti municipal Rive-Sud	603	22.8%
Total valid votes		2,650	100%

District 21
Candidate	Party	Vote	%
Jacques E. Poitras	Parti municipal Rive-Sud	1,193	50.05%
Michèle Ouimet	Ralliement Longueuil	1,191	49.95%
Total valid votes		2,384	100%

District 22
Candidate	Party	Vote	%
Lise Dutil	Ralliement Longueuil	1,212	51.3%
Raymond Dupont	Parti municipal Rive-Sud	1,151	48.7%
Total valid votes		2,363	100%

District 23
Candidate	Party	Vote	%
Stéphane Desjardins	Parti municipal Rive-Sud	1,376	58.6%
Claude Leblanc	Ralliement Longueuil	971	41.4%
Total valid votes		2,347	100%

District 24
Candidate	Party	Vote	%
Suzanne Charbonneau	Ralliement Longueuil	1,299	44.5%
Gabriel Landry	Parti municipal Rive-Sud	1,071	36.7%
Maurice Carpentier	Independent	454	15.5%
Marjolaine Guay	Independent	96	3.3%
Total valid votes		2,920	100%

District 25
Candidate	Party	Vote	%
Lorraine Guay-Boivin	Ralliement Longueuil	1,440	54.4%
Ginette Belleau	Parti municipal Longueuil	1,207	45.6%
Total valid votes		2,647	100%

District 26
Candidate	Party	Vote	%
Michel Latendresse	Ralliement Longueuil	1,378	54.1%
Jean Rossignol	Parti municipal Rive-Sud	1,168	45.9%
Total valid votes		2,546	100%
