= Belzile =

Belzile is a surname. Notable people with the surname include:

- Alex Belzile (born 1991), Canadian ice hockey player
- Alfred Belzile (1907–1994), Canadian politician and farmer
- Charles H. Belzile (born 1933), Canadian Army general
- Florence Belzile (born 2004), Canadian soccer player
- Germain Belzile (1957–2021), Canadian economist
- Gleason Belzile (1898–1950), Canadian politician
