= Ghedin =

Ghedin is an Italian surname. Notable people with the surname include:

- Elodie Ghedin (born 1967), Canadian American parasitologist and virologist
- Pietro Ghedin (born 1952), Italian football player and coach
- Riccardo Ghedin (born 1985), Italian tennis player
