= Descarries =

Descarries is a surname. Notable people with the surname include:

- Francine Descarries (1942–2026), Canadian sociologist
- Joseph Adélard Descarries (1853–1927), French Canadian lawyer and politician
