= Bonnie Campbell =

Bonnie Campbell may refer to:

- Bonnie Campbell (politician) (born 1948), American lawyer and former Iowa Attorney General
- Bonnie K. Campbell, professor of political economy
- Bonnie Jo Campbell (born 1962), American novelist and short story writer

== See also ==
- Bonnie George Campbell, a Child Ballad
