= Louise Nadeau =

Canadian psychologist, professor (b. 1947)

- Born: January 28, 1947 (age 79); Verdun, Quebec
- Title: Professor
- Awards: National Order of Quebec; Order of Canada

Academic background
- Education: Université de Montréal; Université du Québec à Montréal

Academic work
- Discipline: Psychology
- Sub-discipline: Clinical psychology
- Institutions: Université de Montréal

Louise Nadeau OC CQ MSRC (born January 28, 1947) is a Canadian clinical psychologist. She is a professor in the department of psychology at the Université de Montréal in Quebec, Canada, recognized for her contributions to the field of addictions.

== Biography ==
Nadeau was born on January 28, 1947, in Verdun, Quebec. Her mother was a nurse and her father was a veterinarian. She earned a bachelor's degree and a master's degree from the Université de Montréal, and a doctorate from the Université du Québec à Montréal.

In 1981, she co-wrote Va te faire soigner, t'es malade, a series of essays about prejudices facing women with mental health issues.

In the 1990s, she was approached to join Educ'alcool, an organization that aims to promote moderation in alcohol consumption. She served as chair of the board of directors from 2007 to 2019.

Nadeau is a professor in the department of psychology at the Université de Montréal. Her research program has focused on issues associated with women's drug use; mental health issues associated with drug dependence; and the epidemiology of alcohol consumption. Her recent work examines online gambling addiction. She has published over 300 articles.

== Awards and honours ==
In 2012, Nadeau was awarded the inaugural Prix Marie-Andrée-Bertrand, one of the Prix du Québec, by the Quebecois government. In 2013, she was awarded the Prix Acfas Pierre-Dansereau, given for researchers who contribute to the improvement of society. In 2015, she was elected to the Royal Society of Canada.

Nadeau was named to the National Order of Quebec in 2017 and to the Order of Canada in 2018.

== Selected works ==
- Nadeau, Louise; Harvey, Kathryn (1995). "Women's Alcoholic Intoxication: The Origins of the Double Standard in Canada". Addiction Research. 2 (3): 279–290. doi:10.3109/16066359509005213. ISSN 1058-6989.
- Bisson, Jocelyn; Nadeau, Louise; Demers, Andree (1999). "The validity of the CAGE scale to screen for heavy drinking and drinking problems in a general population survey". Addiction. 94 (5): 715–722. doi:10.1046/j.1360-0443.1999.9457159.x. PMID 10563036.
- Nadeau, Louise; Landry, Michel; Racine, Stéphane (1999). "Prevalence of Personality Disorders among Clients in Treatment for Addiction". The Canadian Journal of Psychiatry. 44 (6): 592–596. doi:10.1177/070674379904400609. ISSN 0706-7437. PMID 10497703.
- Nadeau, Louise; Truchon, Manon; Biron, Colette (2000). "High-risk sexual behaviors in a context of substance abuse". Journal of Substance Abuse Treatment. 19 (4): 319–328. doi:10.1016/S0740-5472(00)00127-6. PMID 11166496.
