= Hubert Sacy =

Canadian social communications specialist

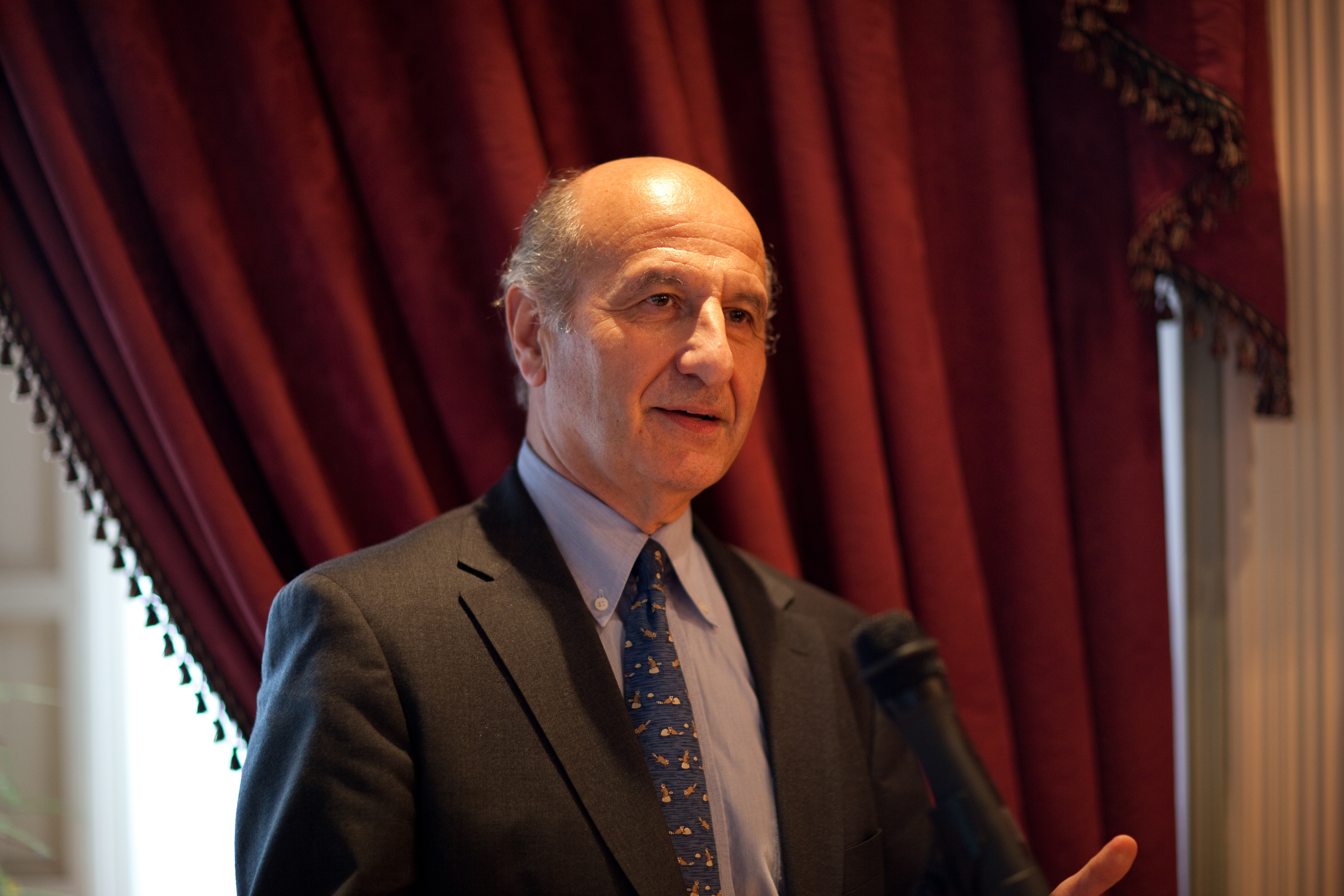
- Sacy, Director General of Éduc'alcool
- Born: August 11, 1949 (age 76); Alexandria, Egypt
- Citizenship: Canadian
- Education: Degree in law and political science Degree in French literature Degree in advertising Accredited in public relations
- Occupation: Director General of Éduc'alcool
- Spouse: Nicole Sacy (m. 1991)
- Awards: National Order of Quebec (2010) Queen Elizabeth II Diamond Jubilee Medal (2012) Order of Canada (2015)

Hubert Sacy is a social communications specialist and public figure known for his work in behavioral prevention and education. Since 1990, he had been Director General of Éduc'alcool, an independent, not-for-profit organization from which he has retired after 32 years. He is well known for creating education and prevention programs in Quebec.

Sacy has been a guest lecturer at Quebec universities (École nationale d'administration publique, Université de Montréal, Université de Sherbrooke, Université Laval and Université du Québec à Montréal), teaching courses on prevention, communication, public relations and marketing. He has also served as an expert witness at administrative tribunals in Quebec on issues related to drinking.

Internationally, he is frequently invited as a speaker to share his views on alcohol education and moderate drinking. Sacy has also participated in the establishment of non-profit organizations similar to Éduc’alcool in several countries. He also served as advisor to various governments.

== Biography, private life and career ==
Sacy was born August 11, 1949, in Alexandria, Egypt. He studied law and political science at Université Saint Joseph - Université de Lyon. He also completed a degree in French literature from École supérieure des Lettres, Université de Lyon. In 1990, he graduated with a degree in advertising from École des Hautes Études Commerciales de Montréal and is accredited in public relations (APR). He married Nicole Sacy in December 1991. Secy lives in Montreal, Quebec.

=== 1970-1980 ===
Sacy began his career in journalism on radio at Société Radio-Canada in 1970. In 1971, he became interested in labour unions and joined the Syndicat des enseignants de Laval as director of information.

In 1974, he joined the Centrale des syndicats du Québec (CSQ) as press agent. From 1978 to 1980, he was in charge of external communications, public relations and advertising.

From 1977 to 1978, Sacy served as Director of Communications for the inquiry into illegal police activity in Quebec, known as the Keable Commission. Among other things, the inquiry looked into the circumstances surrounding the raid on the offices of Agence de presse libre du Québec during the night of October 6–7, 1972, the theft of a list of members of a political party, and the burning of a barn in the Eastern Townships.

=== 1980-1990 ===
Sacy's involvement with teachers’ unions helped him to become chief executive of Alliance des professeurs de Montréal, a position he held from 1980 until 1984, when the CSQ called him back to serve as communications director, a position he held until 1987.

From 1987 to 1990, he served as director of communications for Société de transport de Montréal, the Montreal public transit corporation, reorganizing the department to cover both internal and external communications and to promote public transit.

=== 1990s- present ===
In 1990, Sacy became senior partner in the ad agency Bleublancrouge, where he was in charge of creating and implementing social and behavioural campaigns for public agencies, as well as for federal and provincial government departments to promote healthy habits, a number of anti-smoking campaigns, and a campaign against domestic violence. During his 20 years in advertising, he was chief strategist behind several notable campaigns, such as “Taxer les livres, c’est imposer l’ignorance” (against the proposal to tax books in 1990) and campaigns for the Quebec Bar from 1996 to 1999.

Also in 1990, he became Director General of Éduc'alcool, a not-for-profit organization that promotes moderate drinking and launched a number of popular advertising campaigns, including “Moderation is always in good taste” (1990), “Be prepared to talk to your children about drinking” (2004), “Moderation in 4 numbers: 2-3-4-0” (2011), “Drinking games can be deadly” (2004) and “Low-risk drinking” (2011-2017)

On December 31, 2021, Hubert Sacy stepped down as head of Educ'alcool. Quebec’s Deputy Premier and Minister of Public Security, Geneviève Guilbault took this opportunity to award him the Medal of the National Assembly, in recognition of his accomplishments over the last 30 years.

== Membership in boards, panels and committees ==
During his career, Sacy has served on the boards and panels related to committed to causes in the labour movement, education, prevention, health and social behaviour. He is currently:

- President of Fondation Mise sur toi, a foundation to promote responsible gambling (now run by Loto-Québec);
- Treasurer of the International Council on Alcohol and Addictions (ICAA);
- Chair of the ICAA Alcohol Education Section and its communications committee;
- Member of Canada’s National Alcohol Strategy Advisory Committee;
- Member of the Société québécoise des professionnels en relations publiques;
- Director, Quebec Cancer Foundation;
- Member of the Science Committee, Cité du vin, in Bordeaux, France;
- Director, Educalcohol Costa Rica.

He has also served as:

- Member of the organizing committee for Issues of Substance, the Canadian Centre on Substance Use and Addiction (CCSA) national biennial conference on substance use and addictions;
- Director, Centre Dollard-Cormier;
- Director, Marie-Soleil Tougas Foundation;
- Director, Musée de la civilisation Foundation;
- Member of the Literacy Foundation;
- Member, Board of Governors, Montreal Human Rights Film Festival;
- Chair of the Social Responsibility Committee, Canadian Association of Liquor Jurisdictions.

== Éduc'alcool ==
Under his direction, Éduc'alcool has set a standard for alcohol education and prevention in Quebec. The organization takes a measured approach to the subject, and has produced a wide variety of brochures, videos, and other documents that have been distributed across Canada and internationally. He has played a significant role in establishing Éduc’alcool in France (now known as Vin et Société), Australia (Drinkwise Australia), Costa Rica (Educalcohol Costa Rica) and Portugal (Éduc’alcool Portugal).

Under his leadership, Éduc'alcool model has been recognized by the government of Sweden began reviewing its policies on alcohol in 2004 and he was called by the Swedish government in Stockholm was asked to provide information on the Éduc’alcool model. In 2005, when the Australian alcoholic beverage industry decided to establish a responsible drinking organization, it was inspired by Éduc’alcool in Quebec. Sacy went to Australia twice for this purpose, and he hosted two Australian delegations in Montreal. The European Community established its alcohol policy in 2006. Sacy was invited to Brussels to present Éduc’alcool and explain its operations to the Directorate General for Health and Consumers (DG SANCO). When the European Commissioner came to Toronto for an international conference, he met with Sacy to hear for himself what his staff had reported. Sacy has been asked by various organizations in a number of countries to share his experience and provide inspiration. In 2007, written testimonials from France and the Shetland Islands in Scotland, noted his support and contributions.

== Public speaking ==
As Director General of Éduc’alcool since 1990, Sacy has been in charge of the organization’s programs, campaigns and activities, managing projects, developing partnerships and making recommendations to the board of directors. He speaks on behalf of Éduc’alcool on various occasions, appearing at public hearings, and presenting briefs. He is invited regularly to speak on ethics, prevention and alcohol abuse at scientific conferences in Quebec and around the world. Some of the more recent events at which he was a speaker include:

- “Les sociétés d’État, SAQ et Loto-Québec: centres de profits ou centres de responsabilités?” held at Université du Québec à Montréal on November 14, 2016;
- “Prendre un verre, prendre un coup. Débanaliser et agir!” organized by Association pour la Santé Publique du Québec on December 8, 2015, in Montreal;
- “Le jeu doit rester un jeu,” November 23, 2013, at Concordia University.

== Publications and lectures ==
Sacy has written articles for publications in the fields of communication, prevention, transportation, education and labour relations. “A feast for the creative eye” appeared in the March 2006 edition of Marketing Magazine, “Les jeunes et l’alcool: vers un modèle de prévention alliant éducation et encadrement” was published in 2011 in Adolescents et alcool, un cocktail détonant. More recently, he co-authored the report, “What Is a Drink? Communicating Drink Information to the Consumer,” for the National Alcohol Strategy Advisory Committee as a member of the Sub-Committee on Labelling alcoholic beverages container with information on Standard Drinks, in May 2015.

== Awards and prizes ==
In 2015, Sacy was named a member of the Order of Canada, the second-highest honour for merit in the country, recognizing the outstanding merit or distinguished service of those who make a major difference to Canada through lifelong contributions in every field of endeavor.

In 2012, he received the Queen Elizabeth II Diamond Jubilee Medal, a commemorative medal honouring significant contributions and achievements by Canadians.

In 2010, he was named a Knight of the National Order of Quebec.

Other awards includes

- Hospitalier d’Honneur, Ordre des Hospitaliers de Pomerol, France, June 2016;
- Member of the Confraria do Vinho do Porto, Portugal, October 2015;
- Commandeur d’Honneur, Commanderie du Bontemps, France, June 2009;
- Member of the Federação das Confrarias Báquicas, Portugal, June 2006;
- Trophée de l’Esprit alimentaire pour la Science, France, 2006;
- Marketing Personality of the Year and Strategy award in the category Marketing—Cultural, Social or Not-for-profit Enterprises, Association marketing de Montréal, April 2005;
- Two “Canadian Campaign of the Year” awards from the Canadian Public Relations Society;
- Eight awards from the Société des relationnistes du Québec;
- Five “Prix Omnibus” awards for excellence in communications and marketing from the Canadian Urban Transit Association;
