= Prix Marie-Andrée-Bertrand =

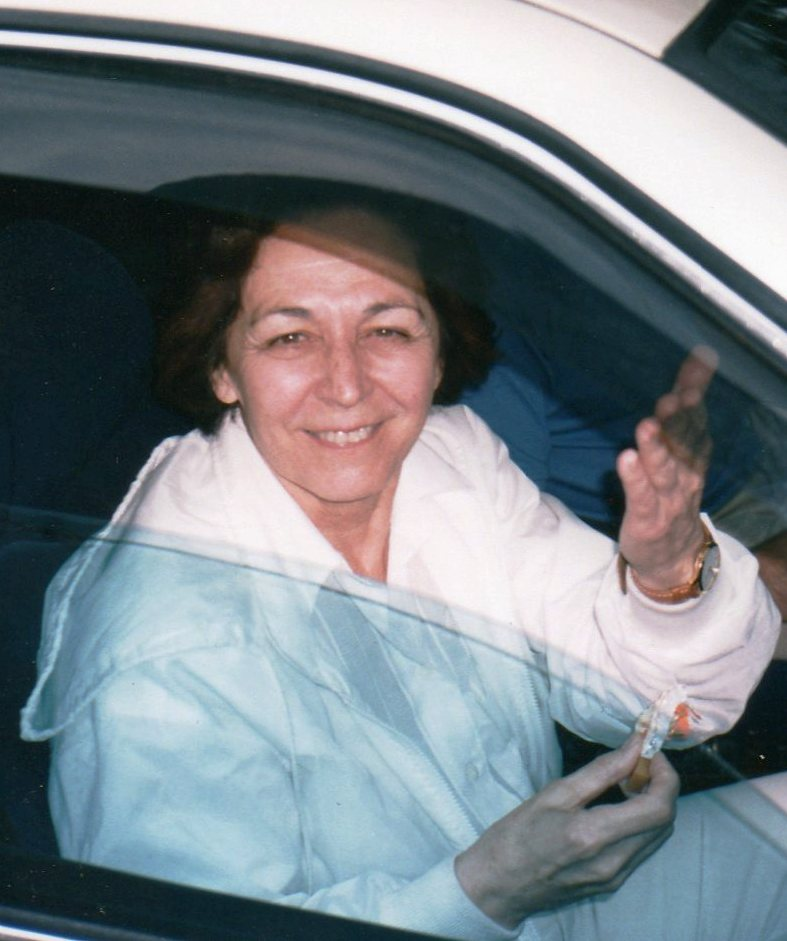
Marie-Andrée Bertrand, 1997

The Prix Marie-Andrée-Bertrand is an award by the Government of Quebec that is part of the Prix du Québec. It is awarded to persons whose scope and scientific quality of research led to the development and implementation of social innovations, leading to the well-being of individuals and communities. Only the disciplines of the humanities and social sciences are recognized for this award. It is named in honour of Marie-Andrée Bertrand.

== Winners ==
- 2012 - Louise Nadeau
- 2013 - Marguerite Mendell
- 2014 - Camil Bouchard
- 2015 - Benoît Lévesque
- 2016 - Carole Lévesque
- 2017 - Richard E. Tremblay
- 2018 - Francine de Montigny
- 2019 - Francine Descarries
- 2020 - Mireille Cyr
- 2021 - Francine Saillant
- 2022 - Marie-Thérèse Chicha
- 2023 - Céline Bellot
- 2024 - Myriam Denov

== See also ==
- List of social sciences awards
