= Myriam Denov =

Canadian sociologist

Academic background
- Education: BA, Sociology and Criminology, 1993 University of Toronto, BSW, 1994,McGill University; MA, Criminology, 1996, University of Ottawa; PhD, Criminology, 2000, University of Cambridge
- Thesis: Gender typifications and the experiences of survivors of child sexual abuse by female perpetrators: a qualitative analysis (1996)

Academic work
- Institutions: McGill University; University of Ottawa

Myriam S. Denov is a Canadian scholar and child advocate. She is a Tier 1 Canada Research Chair in Children, Families, and Armed Conflict at McGill University. Denov is a Trudeau Foundation Fellow and a Member of the Royal Society of Canada's College of New Scholars, Artists, and Scientists.

== Early life and education ==
Denov completed her Bachelor of Arts degree in sociology and criminology at the University of Toronto, and her BSW at McGill University before enrolling at the University of Ottawa for her Master of Arts degree. Upon completing these degrees, she moved to the United Kingdom to attend the University of Cambridge for her PhD in criminology.

== Career ==
Following her PhD at the University of Cambridge, Denov returned to Canada and became an assistant professor in the Department of Criminology at the University of Ottawa. In this role, she travelled to Sierra Leone to partner with a local NGO interviewing former child soldiers as part of a research project on the long-term effects of the war. During her time in Sierra Leone, she employed a community-based participatory research method called PhotoVoice which allows the former child soldiers to document their daily lives using cameras.

Denov eventually joined the faculty of McGill University's School of Social Work where she was appointed a Tier 1 Canada Research Chair in Children, Families, and Armed Conflict to extend her research in the lived experiences of children during wartime. Denov used her 2014 Trudeau Foundation Fellowship to focus on children born of wartime rape. She collaborated with two NGOs to investigate these children's lived experiences and their relationships with their families and communities. As part of her fellowship, she co-developed an art-based research project involving 79 children who had been born into captivity in the LRA. The children created masks to narrate their experiences and process their traumatic memories. The results of her study found that children who were born to mothers abducted and raped by members of the Lord's Resistance Army (LRA) felt that wartime was better than peacetime. This was because they felt a greater sense of family cohesion and status within the LRA during the conflict. As well, following the conflict these children often endured stigmatization and social exclusion.

Following her fellowship, Denov was named a member of the Royal Society of Canada's College of New Scholars, Artists, and Scientists for "opening up new lines of inquiry and drawing international attention to war-affected children." In 2020, Denov was the recipient of a Killam Research Fellowship to focus on continuing her research investigating the perspectives, realities, and psychosocial needs of children born of war in northern Uganda. She was also awarded a Social Sciences and Humanities Research Council of Canada Impact Award in recognition of her research on children and families affected by war. In 2022, Denov was renewed as a Tier 1 Canada Research Chair at McGill.

In 2024 she was named the recipient of the Prix Marie-Andrée-Bertrand.

== Selected publications ==
- Children Affected by Armed Conflict: Theory, Method, and Practice (2017)
- Global Child: Children and Families Affected by War, Displacement & Migration (2023)
- Introduction to Social Work in Canada: Histories, Contexts, and Practices (2022)
- Social Work Practice with War-Affected Children (2019)
- Child Soldiers: Sierra Leone's Revolutionary United Front (2010)
