= 2025 Longueuil municipal election =

Election in Quebec, Canada

← 2021	November 2, 2025	2029 →
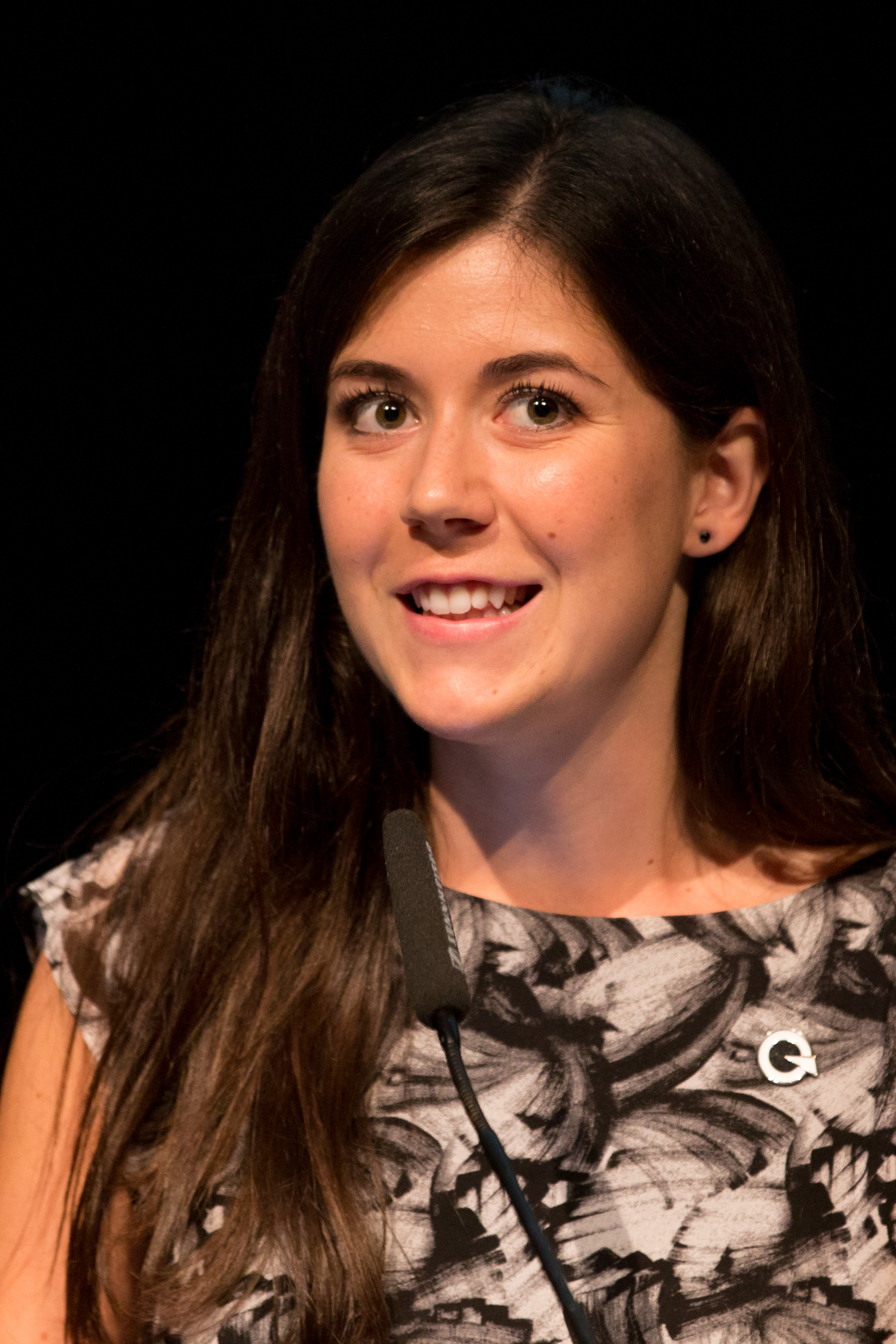
	First party	Second party
		AL
Leader	Catherine Fournier	Sacha Parisella
Party	Coalition Longueuil	Agora Longueuil
Leader's seat	Mayor	Ran for Mayor (lost)
Popular vote	51,674	6,501
Percentage	88.83%	11.17%
Mayor before election
Catherine Fournier
Elected mayor
Catherine Fournier
- City Council election
← 2021	November 2, 2025	2029 →
- 18 seats on Longueuil City Council; 10 seats needed for a majority
Party	Leader	Vote %	Seats	+/–
CL	Catherine Fournier		18	+5
This lists parties that won seats. See the complete results below.

Municipal elections were held in Longueuil on November 2, 2025, the same day as elections in other municipalities in the province.

== City council ==
=== District 1 - de Longueuil-Montréal-Sud ===
Party	Candidate	Vote	%
Coalition Longueuil	Sylvain Larocque (X)	2,487	84.42
Independent	Xavier Mulot	459	15.58

=== District 2 - de Saint-Charles ===
Party	Candidate	Vote
Coalition Longueuil	Lyette Bouchard	Acclaimed

=== District 3 - de Fatima-du Parcours-du-Cerf ===
Party	Candidate	Vote	%
Coalition Longueuil	Marc-Antoine Azouz (X)	3,605	90.85
Option Alliance	Guy Sauvé	363	9.15

=== District 4 - du Parc-Michel-Chartrand ===
Party	Candidate	Vote	%
Coalition Longueuil	Jonathan Tabarah (X)	4,378	91.90
Independent	Denis Gauthier	386	8.10

=== District 5 - du Boisé-Du Tremblay ===
Party	Candidate	Vote	%
Coalition Longueuil	Lysa Belaicha (X)	3,404	83.13
Independent	René Grignon	691	16.87

=== District 6 - du Boisé-Fonrouge ===
Party	Candidate	Vote	%
Coalition Longueuil	Reine Bombo-Allara (X)	2,239	77.39
Independent	Vincent Lavigne	654	22.61

=== District 7 - de Georges-Dor ===
Party	Candidate	Vote	%
Coalition Longueuil	Nicola Grenon	2,976	87.09
Option Alliance	Martine Joanisse	441	12.91

=== District 8 - d'Antoinette-Robidoux ===
Party	Candidate	Vote	%
Coalition Longueuil	Marie-Michèle Drolet	1,964	85.69
Option Alliance	Lovejoyce Amavi	167	7.29
Independent	Meera Trivedi	94	4.10
Independent	Seydou Nourou Dia	67	2.92

=== District 9 - du Coteau-Rouge ===
Party	Candidate	Vote
Coalition Longueuil	Carl Lévesque (X)	Acclaimed

=== District 10 - de LeMoyne-Jacques-Cartier ===
Party	Candidate	Vote	%
Coalition Longueuil	Frédéric Barbeau	2,015	70.43
Option Alliance	Karl Ferraro (X)	846	29.57

=== District 11 - de Greenfield Park ===
Party	Candidate	Vote	%
Coalition Longueuil	Sylvain Joly (X)	2,692	63.96
Option Alliance	Susan Rasmussen	1,517	36.04

==== Greenfield Park Borough Council ====
Seat 1
Party	Candidate	Vote	%
Coalition Longueuil	Eric Normandin (X)	2,606	62.43
Option Alliance	Raphaelle Harvey	1,568	37.57

Seat 2
Party	Candidate	Vote	%
Coalition Longueuil	Christopher Keays	2,752	65.54
Option Alliance	Richard Shapcott	1,447	34.46

=== District 12 - de Laflèche ===
Party	Candidate	Vote	%
Coalition Longueuil	Sophie Paquette	1,593	68.08
Option Alliance	Erika Marchand	584	24.96
Agora Longueuil	Sabrina Parisella	163	6.97

=== District 13 - du Boisé-Pilon ===
Party	Candidate	Vote	%
Coalition Longueuil	Chrep Lok	2,215	79.45
Option Alliance	Joanne Costo	388	13.92
Independent	Michel Coursol	108	3.87
Independent	Yvonne Mankou	77	2.76

=== District 14 - du Vieux-Saint-Hubert-la Savane ===
Party	Candidate	Vote	%
Coalition Longueuil	Sylvain Lambert	2,264	71.08
Option Alliance	Jean-François Boivin	784	24.62
Independent	Prasanthi Akilla	137	4.30

=== District 15 - du Ruisseau-Massé ===
Party	Candidate	Vote	%
Coalition Longueuil	Florent Sabourin-Lefebvre	2,474	79.32
Option Alliance	Pathy Bitafu	244	7.82
Agora Longueuil	Martin Lefebvre	238	7.63
Independent	Naina Vaya	163	5.23

=== District 16 - du Parc-de-la-Cité ===
Party	Candidate	Vote
Coalition Longueuil	Affine Lwalalika (X)	Acclaimed

=== District 17 - de Croydon-Iberville ===
Party	Candidate	Vote	%
Coalition Longueuil	Alvaro Cueto (X)	2,330	77.82
Option Alliance	Nicolas Brosseau	457	15.26
Independent	Naina Vaya	207	6.91

=== District 18 - des Maraîchers ===
Party	Candidate	Vote	%
Coalition Longueuil	Nathalie Delisle (X)	2,588	85.95
Option Alliance	Jason Blood	423	14.05
