= Educ'alcool =

- Company type: Not-for-profit
- Founded: 1989
- Headquarters: Montreal, QC, Canada
- Key people: Geneviève Desautels (Director general)
- Website: educalcool.qc.ca

Educ'alcool is a Canada based not-for-profit organization established in 1989. It works primarily within Quebec to encourage moderate, enlightened drinking, and influence drinking contexts. It launched a series of actions and programs with communities locally and globally to create awareness, educate and prevent inform programs designed to help young people and adults about excessive drinking.

Éduc’alcool’s Director General is Hubert Sacy, recipient of an Order of Canada award in 2015 and a National Order of Quebec Knighthood in 2010 for his work in alcohol-abuse prevention and education.

== Initiatives ==
In Canada, Health Canada supported the Educ'alcool for imposing new regulations on alcoholic energy drinks for teenagers. They have raised concerns for alcohol drinking habits and collected information, learn more about causes, and find appropriate physicians. Educ'alcool works with the government and organization to provide an easy accessible and inexpensive environment to improve drinking habits throughout the country.

Educ'alcool is well-known for promoting low-risk drinking campaigns. The campaign “Low-Risk Drinking: 2•3•4•0, which breaks down the number of drinks that can be safely consumed according to gender, weight, age, and other factors, is the organization’s yearly campaign against underage drinking; and holiday campaigns against underage drinking started a national discussion on the state of drinking habits in Canada. In 2012, with input and advocacy from Éduc’alcool and other educational and public-awareness organizations, the Quebec government enacted a zero-tolerance policy with respect to drinking for drivers under the age of 22. Quebec’s Ministry of Health and Social Services (Santé et Services sociaux Québec) partnered with Éduc’alcool to develop the program “Alcochoix+” which provides free confidential guidance, workshops, and prevention tools to Quebeckers concerned about their current drinking habits.
