= Jacques Rousseau Award =

Prize for work across disciplines

Jacques Rousseau Award is an award given by the Association francophone pour le savoir (ACFAS) to an individual or group who develop bridges between scientific disciplines. The award is named for Jacques Rousseau who was both a botanist and an anthropologist. He was a former secretary of the ACFAS.

== Laureates ==
- 1981 : Louis Berlinguet
- 1982 : Gilles Paquet
- 1983 : Larkin Kerwin
- 1984 : Fernand Dumont
- 1985 : Gérard Bouchard
- 1986 : Fernand Roberge
- 1987 : Michael Florian
- 1988 : André Roch Lecours
- 1989 : Henri Dorion
- 1990 : Paul Brazeau
- 1991 : Jean-Charles Chebat
- 1992 : Ferdinand Bonn
- 1993 : Karen Messing
- 1994 : Régine Robin
- 1995 : Albert Bregman
- 1998 : Rodolphe De Koninck
- 1999 : Gilbert Laporte
- 2000 : Michel Laroche
- 2001 : Normand Séguin
- 2002 : Richard E Tremblay
- 2003 : Leon Glass
- 2004 : No award
- 2005 : No award
- 2006 : No award
- 2007 : Yves Gingras
- 2008 : Pierre Hansen, researching mathematics and management, HEC Montréal
- 2009 : Isabelle Peretz, researching neuroscience and music, Montreal University
- 2010 : Louise Vandelac, researching sociology and environment

, Université du Québec à Montréal

- 2011 : Bartha Knoppers, researching ethics and biotechnology, McGill University
- 2012 : Mohamad Sawan, researching implants, École Polytechnique de Montréal
- 2013 : Yves De Koninck, researching neurosciences, Université Laval
- 2014 : Sylvain Martel, researching nanorobotics, École Polytechnique de Montréal
- 2015 : Carl-Éric Aubin, researching genetic biomédical, École Polytechnique de Montréal
- 2016 : André-Pierre Contandriopoulos
