= Sylvie Parent =

Canadian politician

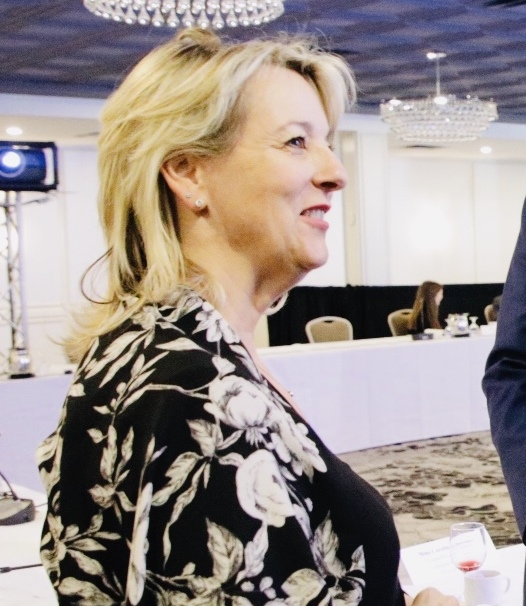
Sylvie Parent in 2019

Sylvie Parent is a Canadian politician. She was mayor of Longueuil, Quebec from November 5, 2017 to November 14, 2021. She was the second female mayor in the city's history.

== Biography ==
Parent was educated at the Université du Québec à Trois-Rivières where she earned a bachelor's degree in psychoeducation. Before entering politics, she worked for the Director of Youth Protection in Montreal and for the Chief Electoral Officer of Quebec as a returning officer.

She was first elected to Longueuil City Council in the 2009 Quebec municipal elections in the district of Fatima-du Parcours-du-Cerf. On council, she was the head of the city's Finance and Human Resources Commission and was co-chair of the Budget, Finance and Administration Commission for Urban agglomeration of Longueuil.

Parent was the right-hand woman of mayor Caroline St-Hilaire during her time in office, and succeeded her as head of the Action Longueuil party in April 2017. In the 2017 mayoral election, she narrowly defeated Josée Latendresse by just over 100 votes out of over 58,000 cast. Despite winning the mayoralty, her party won just 6 of the 16 seats on council.

In April 2019, a report in La Presse revealed that her salary would increase 49%, from $161,000 to more than $240,000. This made her the highest paid municipal politician in the province. Longueuil's leader of the opposition, Xavier Léger, accused her among other things of combining regional positions in order to increase her salary.

== Personal life ==
Parent has three children and has lived in Longueuil for more than 30 years. On 8 September 2020, Parent tested positive for COVID-19 during the COVID-19 pandemic in Quebec.
