= Richard E. Tremblay =

Canadian psychologist (born 1944)

Richard E. Tremblay OC FRSC
- Born: November 23, 1944 (age 81)
- Education: University of London (Ph.D., 1976)
- Known for: Juvenile delinquency
- Awards: 2002 Jacques Rousseau Award; 2003 Innis-Gérin Medal; 2017 Stockholm Prize in Criminology
- Scientific career
- Fields: Child psychology
- Workplaces: University of Montreal
- Thesis: A Psycho-Educational Study of Juvenile Delinquents During Residential Treatment (1976)

Richard Ernest Tremblay OC FRSC (born November 23, 1944) is a Canadian child psychologist and Professor of Pediatrics, Psychiatry, and Psychology at the University of Montreal, where he holds the Canada Research Chair in child development. He has also served as director of the Research Unit on Children's Psychosocial Maladjustment, a multidisciplinary research unit funded by the University of Montreal, Laval University, and McGill University, since it was founded in 1984. His research has focused on the development of aggressive behavior in children and the potential for early intervention programs to reduce the chances of children turning to crime in adulthood.

Tremblay received his B.A. from the University of Ottawa, where he majored in physical education and played as a goal tender for the Ottawa Gee-Gees, the school's ice hockey team. He subsequently completed and received his master's degree from the University of Montreal and his Ph.D. from the University of London.

In 2002, Tremblay received the Jacques Rousseau Award from the Association francophone pour le savoir, and in 2003, he received the Innis-Gérin Medal from the Royal Society of Canada. In 2017, he received the 2017 Stockholm Prize in Criminology for his work studying delinquency in children, making him the first Canadian to receive this prize. Also in 2017, he received the Prix Marie-Andrée-Bertrand from the government of Québec. He is a fellow of the Royal Society of Canada and the Molson Fellow of the Canadian Institute for Advanced Research.
