= Claude Corbo =

Political Scientist (born 1945)

Claude Corbo PhD
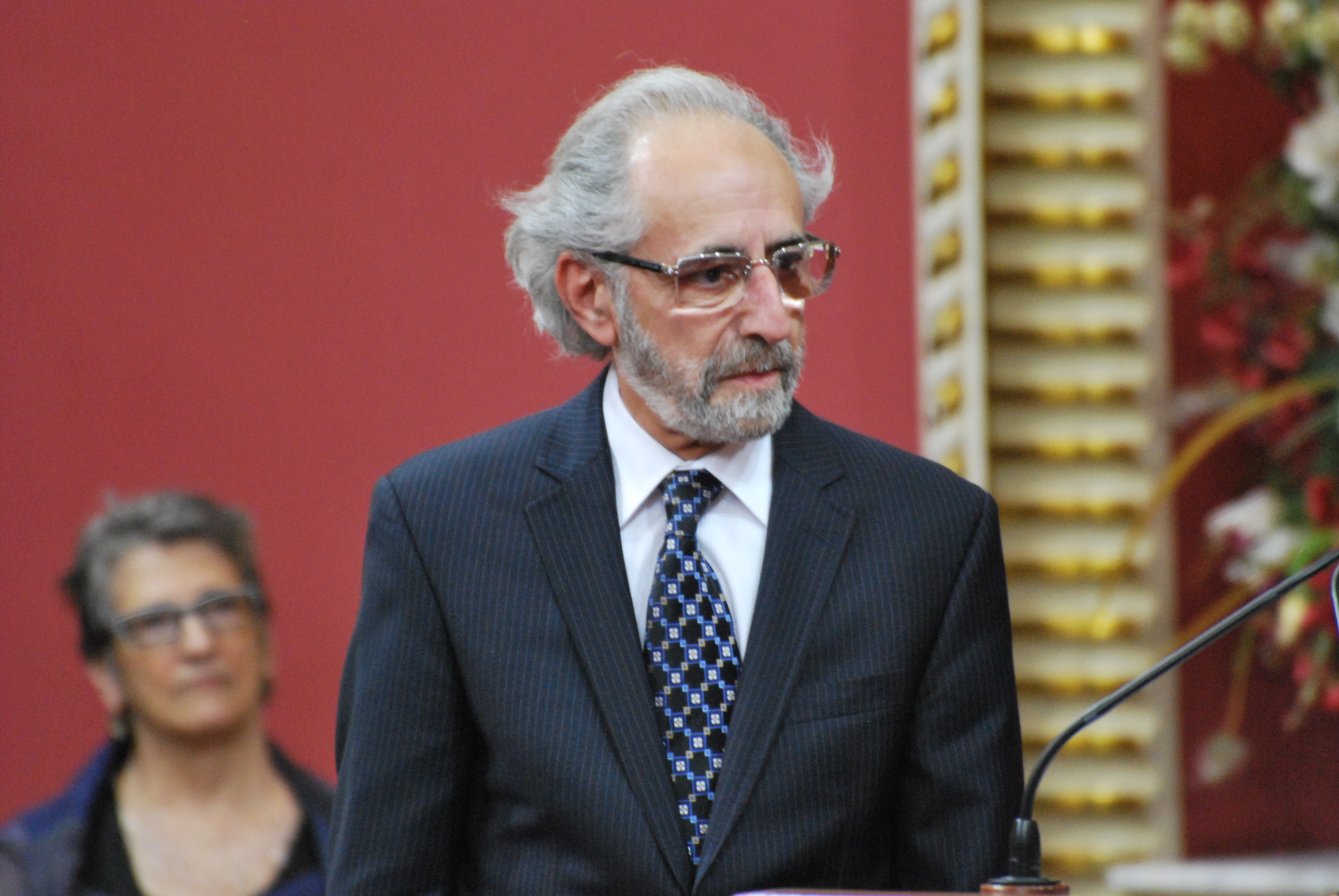

Rector of Université du Québec à Montréal
- In office January 7, 2008 – January 7, 2013
- Preceded by: Danielle Laberge (intérim)
- Succeeded by: Robert Proulx

Rector of Université du Québec à Montréal
- In office June 19, 1986 – January 7, 1996
- Preceded by: Pierre Brossard (interim)
- Succeeded by: Gilbert Dionne (interim)

Personal details
- Born: 1945 (age 80–81) Montreal, Quebec, Canada
- Education: Collège Jean-de-Brébeuf, Université de Montréal

Claude Corbo (born 1945 in Montreal) is a political scientist. He is from an Italian father and a Québécois mother, was a university professor in political science, a university administrator, and the rector of the Université du Québec à Montréal.

== Biography ==
Professor in the Department of Political Science at the Université du Québec à Montréal since its creation in 1969, Corbo occupied several positions at the heart of this university through his entire career. Among many other positions, he was vice dean of humanities from 1972 to 1974, registrar from 1974 to 1978, dean of resource management from 1978 to 1979, vice rector from 1979 to 1981, and vice rector of academics and research from 1981 to 1986. Claude Corbo then accessed the position of rector of the institution in 1986. He served as rector for ten years until 1996, which marked his return to teaching. Since January 7, 2008, he is once again the rector of the UQAM.
