= Claude Gladu =

28th mayor of Longueuil, Quebec, Canada

His Worship Claude Gladu

28th Mayor of Longueuil
- In office 1994–2001
- Preceded by: Roger Ferland
- Succeeded by: Jacques Olivier
- In office 2005–2009
- Preceded by: Jacques Olivier
- Succeeded by: Caroline St-Hilaire

Personal details
- Born: January 13, 1942 (age 84) Longueuil, Quebec
- Party: Parti municipal de Longueuil
- Profession: Entrepreneur

Claude Gladu (born January 13, 1942) is the former mayor of the city of Longueuil, Quebec. He served as mayor from 1994 to 2001 and from 2005 to 2009.

Gladu started his career as a firefighter for Ville Jacques-Cartier in the 1960s.

He first served as a city councillor in 1982, and during the 1980s was the president of the Société de transport de la Rive-Sud de Montréal (now the Réseau de transport de Longueuil).

Gladu served as the mayor of Longueuil from 1994 to 2001. The pre-2001 city of Longueuil merged with the surrounding municipalities of Boucherville, Brossard, Greenfield Park, LeMoyne, Saint-Bruno-de-Montarville, Saint-Hubert and Saint-Lambert on January 1, 2002. Jacques Olivier was elected mayor of the merged municipality.

In 2005, Boucherville, Brossard, Saint-Bruno-de-Montarville and Saint-Lambert voted to demerge from Longueuil. The demerger took effect on January 1, 2006. Following the demerger referendums, Gladu, leader of the Parti Municipal de Longueuil, won the municipal elections of Longueuil on November 6, 2005. On April 19, 2009, Claude Gladu announced that he would not seek re-election as mayor of Longueuil. He and his party instead threw their support behind former Longueuil City Council member Jacques Goyette. Goyette lost the election to Caroline St-Hilaire.

== Election results ==
2005 Longueuil municipal election
Candidate	Vote	%
Claude Gladu	40,384	64.2
Claude Lamoureux	22,502	35.8
