= The Extractive Industries and Society =

- Discipline: Environmental studies
- Language: English
- Edited by: Gavin Hilson

Publication details
- History: 2014–present
- Publisher: Elsevier
- Frequency: Biannual
- Impact factor: 3.586 (2020)

Standard abbreviations
- ISO 4: Extr. Ind. Soc.

Indexing
- ISSN: 2214-790X (print); 2214-7918 (web)
- LCCN: 2014204912
- OCLC no.: 881807318

Links
- Journal homepage; Online access; Online archive

The Extractive Industries and Society is a quarterly peer-reviewed academic journal in the field of environmental studies, with a specific focus on the societal and environmental impacts of extractive industries such as the mining and oil and gas industries. It was established in 2014 and is published by Elsevier. The founder and editor-in-chief is Professor Gavin Hilson (University of Surrey). According to the Journal Citation Reports, the journal has a 2020 impact factor of 3.586, ranking it 50th out of 125 journals in the category "Environmental Studies".
