= Karen Messing =

Canadian geneticist and ergonomist

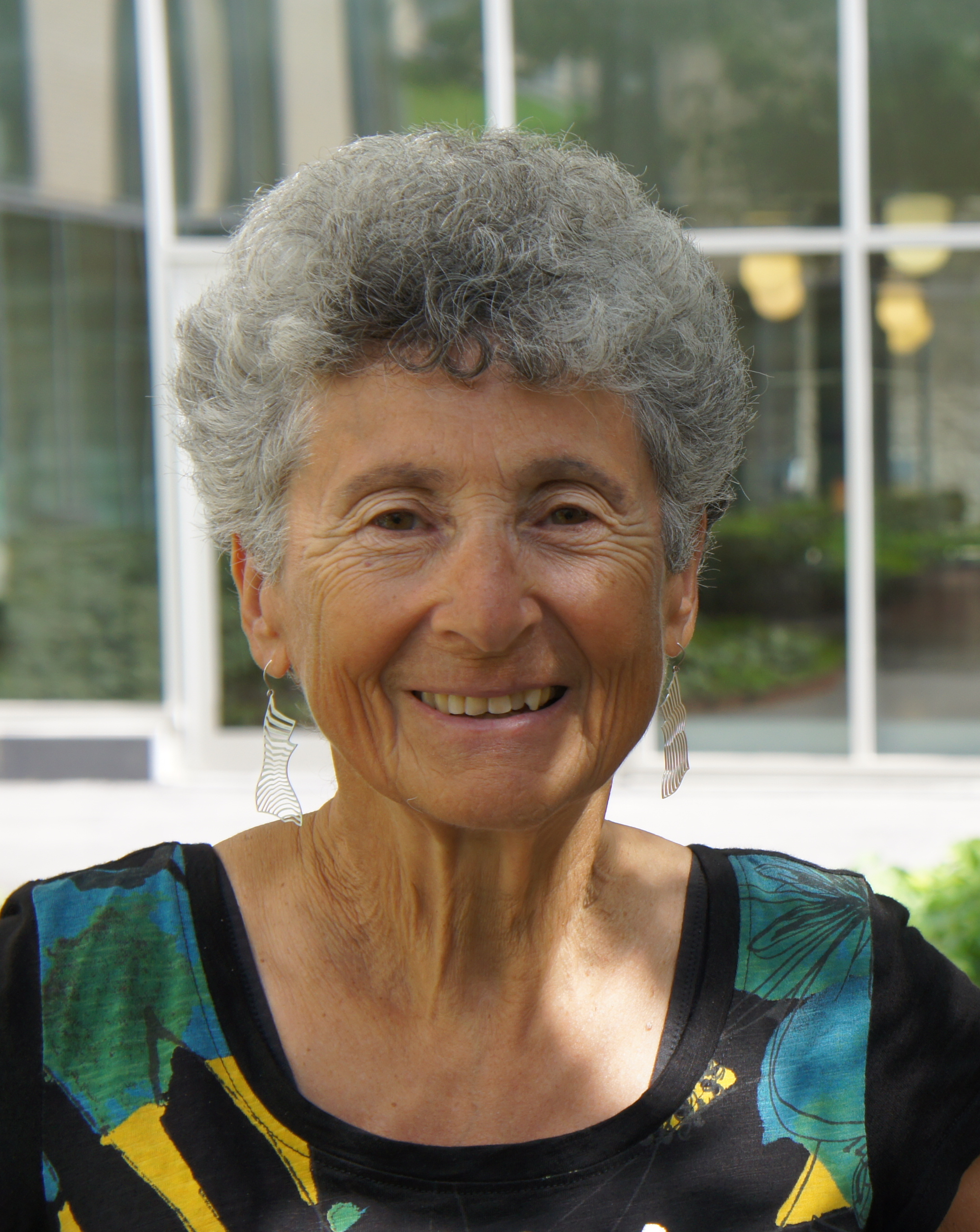
- Prof. Messing
- Born: 2 February 1943 (age 83); Springfield, Massachusetts
- Occupation: Academic
- Writing career
- Subjects: Ergomics and occupational health

Karen Messing (born 2 February 1943) is a Canadian geneticist and ergonomist. She is an emeritus professor in the biological sciences at the University of Quebec at Montreal. She is known for her work on gender, environmental health and ergonomics. She was given the Jacques Rousseau Award in 1993, the Governor General's Award in 2009, and was named an Officer of the Order of Canada on December 27, 2019.

== Career ==
Messing was born in Springfield, Massachusetts in 1943. She studied social sciences at Harvard before deciding to focus on science. She went to McGill University in Montreal where she studied biology, genetics and chemistry. She faced prejudice from colleagues because she was a single mother.

She began teaching at University of Quebec at Montreal in 1976 and two years later she was conducting research amongst phosphate workers. She knew of the potential and radioactivity and discovered that amongst six workers, four of them had children with birth defects like a club foot. She did manage to get dust extraction equipment installed but only on the proviso that the researchers left the factory. Messing reflects that this event focused her later work on occupational health.

In 1990 she spent a year studying a toilet cleaner named Nina who walked 23 km every day as she cleaned toilets in 1–2 minutes. This work led to recommendations that were adopted and to her specializing in ergonomics and winning an award. She was given the Jacques Rousseau Award in 1993. This award recognises leading Canadians who are working across disciplines.

Messing co-founded the Center for Interdisciplinary Research in Biology, Health, Society and the Environment (CINBIOSE) at her university.

She has worked for thirty years to also increase opportunities for women. She chaired the committee that advises on gender and ergonomics at the International Association of Ergonomics.

== Awards and recognition ==
- Order of Canada, 2019
- Yant Award (American Industrial Hygiene Association), 2014
- Women of Distinction Award (Science and Technology) (YWCA)), 1994
- Governor General's Award in Commemoration of the Persons Case, 2009
- Jacques Rousseau Award, 1993

== Selected bibliography ==
- Messing, K. 2021. Bent out of shape : shame, solidarity, and women's bodies at work. Toronto: Between the Lines.
- Messing, K. Invisible suffering : for a science that listen to workers' voices [en coréen, traduit par Inah Kim] (Dongnyok Press, Séoul, Corée du Sud, publication prévue en août 2017).
- Messing K (2016). Les souffrances invisibles : Pour une science à l’écoute des gens [traduit par Marianne Champagne] (Écosociété, 2016). Avec mise à jour et nouvelle conclusion par l'auteure.
- Messing K (2014). Pain and Prejudice: What Science Can Learn about Work from the People Who Do It. BTL Books, Toronto. Finaliste (“short list”) pour le Prix Science and Society de la Canadian Science Writers Association.
- Messing, K., Ostlin, P. 2006. Gender Equality, Work and Health : A Review Of The Evidence, Organisation mondiale de la santé, Genève
- Messing, K. (2000). La santé des travailleuses: La science est-elle aveugle? traduction et mise à jour de One-eyed Science. Éditions du remue-ménage (Montréal) avec Octarès (Toulouse).
- Messing, K. (dir.) (1999). Comprendre le travail des femmes pour le transformer. Bruxelles: Institut syndical européen pour la recherche, la formation et la santé-sécurité.
- Messing, K. 1999. Integrating gender in ergonomic analysis : strategies for transforming women's work : joint action-oriented research by the University of Quebec and trade unions. Brussels: Trades Union Technical Bureau, European Economic Community.
- Messing, K. 1999. Comprendre le travail des femmes pour le transformer : une recherche-action menée par l'Université et les organisations syndicales québécoises. Brussels: Trades Union Technical Bureau.
- Messing, K. 1999. Compreender o trabalho das mulheres para o transformar. Lisboa: Commissao para a igualdade no trabalho e no emprego (CITE).
- Messing, K. 1999. Comprendere il lavoro delle donne per trasformarlo. Roma: Istituto Superiore per la Prevenzione e la Sicurezza del Lavoro (ISPESL).
- Messing, K. 1999. I Ensomatosi tou fylou stin Ergonomiki Analisi. Stratigikes gia tin metekseliksi tis Ergasias ton Gynaikon Athènes: EDEM.
- Messing, K. 1999. El trabajo de las mujeres: Comprender para transformar. Madrid: Catarata.
- Kilbom, A., Messing, K., Thorbjornsson, C. (eds.) (1998) Women's Health at Work/ Yrkesarbetande kvinnors hälsa. National Institute for Working Life, Sweden. Disponible au
- Messing, K. (1998). One-eyed Science: Occupational Health and Women Workers. Philadelphia: Temple University Press.
- Messing, K., Seifert, Ana Maria, Escalona, Evelin. 1996. La minute de 120 secondes: Analyse du travail des enseignantes de niveau primaire. Québec: Centrale de l'enseignement du Québec. Traduit en espagnol et en basque par les syndicats d’enseignement de l’Espagne.
- Messing, K., Neis, B. and Dumais, L. (eds.) 1995. Invisible: Issues in Women's Occupational Health and Safety/Invisible: La santé des travailleuses. Charlottetown, PEI: Gynergy Books.
- Messing, K. (1991). Occupational Health and Safety Concerns of Canadian Women: A review/Santé et sécurité des travailleuses: un document de base. Labour Canada 110pp.
- Messing, K., Simoneau, S., Vanier, D. (1990). Les radiations en milieu de travail. Comité conjoint UQAM-CSN-FTQ. 84 pages.
