= Bonnie K. Campbell =

Canadian political economist

Bonnie Kathleen Campbell (MA., DPhil, University of Sussex), is professor emeritus of political economy at the Department of Political Science at the Université du Québec à Montréal (UQAM). She has written extensively on issues related to international development, development assistance, governance, and mining.

== Career ==
Professor Campbell was Director (2011-2017) of the Centre interdisciplinaire de recherche en développement international et société (CIRDIS) and the Director of the Research Group on Mining Activities in Africa (Groupe de recherche sur les activités minières en Afrique). She was a member of the Advisory Group appointed by the Canadian federal government for the National Roundtables on Corporate Social Responsibility (CSR) and the Canadian Extractive Sector in Developing Countries (2006-2007) and a member of the International Study Group of the United Nations Economic Commission for Africa (UNECA) on the revision of mining regimes in Africa from 2007 to 2011. She is currently a member of the advisory board of the Strategic Dialogue on Sustainable Raw Materials for Europe (Strade Project).

== Recognitions ==
Professor Campbell is a Member of the Royal Society of Canada since 2012, in the Academy of the Arts and Humanities. She was also admitted to the Cercle d'excellence at the Université du Québec in 2006.

== Nominations ==
- Chair of the Board of the North-South Institute, Ottawa, from 2003 to 2006 and Member of the Board from 2000 to 2003.
- Member of the Scientific Advisory Council of the Centre de coopération internationale en recherche agronomique pour le développement (CIRAD), Paris, from 2003 to 2009.
- Member of the Board of the Agency for Cooperation and Research in Development, ACORD, Nairobi.
- Member of the Board of Governors, Vues d'Afrique, Canada.
- President of the Canadian Association of African Studies.
- Member of several editorial boards including that of Review of African Political Economy (UK), Mineral Economics (Sweden), The Extractive Industries and Society, (UK).

== Publications ==
Professor Campbell is the author of many journal articles, and author, editor or co-editor of fourteen volumes including:

- Restructuring in Global Aluminium, with Magnus Ericsson (Eds.) (Mining Journal Books Ltd, London, 1996)
- Regulating Mining in Africa: For whose Benefit? (Nordiska Afrikainstitutet (NAI), Uppsala, Sweden, 2004)
- Qu'allons-nous faire des pauvres? Réformes institutionnelles et espaces politiques ou les pièges de la gouvernance pour les pauvres (L'Harmattan, Paris, 2005)
- Mining in Africa. Regulation and Development (Pluto, London, IDRC, Ottawa and NAI, Uppsala, 2009)
- Pouvoir et régulation dans le secteur minier: leçons à partir de l'expérience canadienne (Presses de l'Université du Québec (PUQ), Quebec, 2012)
- Modes of Governance and Revenue Flows in African Mining (International Political Economy Series, Palgrave Macmillan, Basingstoke, Hampshire, UK, 2013).
- Les transformations des politiques de coopération. Secteurs agricoles et miniers au Canada et en France, with Jean-Jacques Gabas, Denis Pesche and Vincent Ribier. (Eds.) (Karthala-GEMDEV, Paris and Presses de l'Université du Québec, 2016)
- La responsabilité sociale des entreprises dans le secteur minier : Réponse ou obstacle aux enjeux de légitimité et de développement en Afrique ? with Myriam Laforce (Eds.) (Presses de l'Université du Québec, 2016)
