= Greg N. Gregoriou =

Greg N. Gregoriou (1956–2018) was a professor of finance and a native of Montreal, Quebec, Canada.

Gregoriou received his joint Ph.D. in 2004 with a specialization in the area of finance from the University of Quebec at Montreal, Canada. He has edited 52 scientific books, authored 100 refereed publications in scientific journals and book chapters since he started teaching at the State University of New York Plattsburgh in 2003. Professor Gregoriou specialized in hedge funds and CTAs, including research into the optimal number of hedge fund managers in a fund of hedge funds (FoHFs) whereby the variance-reducing effects of diversification decrease once FoHFs maintain more than 20 underlying hedge funds . He was the derivatives editor for the Journal of Asset Management and served on several editorial boards as a member for scientific journals such as the Journal of Wealth Management, the Journal of Risk Management in Financial Institutions, IEB International Journal of Finance , and the Brazilian Business Review. He taught at the University of Navarra in Pamplona (Spain), University of Vermont, and McGill University as a visiting professor.

== Selected books ==
- Reconsidering Funds of Hedge Funds: The Financial Crisis and Best Practices in UCITS, Tail Risk, Performance, and Due Diligence, February 2013 at Elsevier Press, Burlington, MA, ISBN 978-012-401699-6).
- Commodity Trading Advisors: Risk, Performance Analysis, and Selection, September 2004 at John Wiley & Sons, London, ISBN 0-471-68194-6 (co-edited with F.S. Lhabitant, V. Karavas and F. Rouah).
- Stock Market Liquidity: Implications for Market Microstructure and Asset Pricing, January 2008 at John Wiley and Sons, ISBN 978-0-470-18169-0 (co-edited with F.S. Lhabitant), 528 pages.
- International Corporate Governance After Sarbanes-Oxley, March 2006 at John Wiley and Sons, ISBN 978-0-471-77592-8 (co-edited with Paul Ali, 608 pages
- Hedge Funds: Insights In Performance Measurement, Risk Analysis and Portfolio Allocation, August 2005 at John Wiley and Sons, ISBN 978-0-471-73743-8 (co-edited with N. Papageorgiou, G. Hubner and F. Rouah, 653 pages
