= Germain Belzile =

Canadian economist (1957–2021)

Germain Belzile (1957 – 11 November 2021) was an economist born in Chicago, Illinois. Both his parents were from Quebec (Canada). He held a bachelor's degree in Mathematical Economics from the Université Laval and a M.Sc. in economics (macroeconomics) from the Université du Québec à Montréal (UQAM). He did further doctoral studies in economics at UQAM. He specialized in macroeconomic theory, macroeconomic policies, money and banking, and international economics.

== Career ==
Germain Belzile taught economics at HEC Montreal and UQAM for 25 years at the undergraduate and graduate levels. He joined the Montreal Economic Institute in May 2010 as Director of Research.

He was a co-author of Principes de microéconomie and Principes de macroéconomie, the "best seller" economics textbook in French-speaking universities in Canada.

Belzile was the author of numerous articles and he regularly participated in debates, interviews, and conferences on globalization, economics and liberalism.

== Ideas ==
Belzile considered himself as an economist with a libertarian tendency; in fact, his personal blog was called "Libertarian Economist". He was highly influenced by Gérard Bélanger (Université Laval) and Jean-Luc Migué (ÉNAP) as well as Frédéric Bastiat, Alexis de Tocqueville, Mançur Olson, Ronald Coase, James Buchanan, and Gordon Tullock. According to him, individual freedom is the most fundamental value to preserve.

== Death ==
Belzile died on 11 November 2021.

== Publications ==
- Belzile, G.; Mankiw, N.G.; Pépin, B. (2010). Principes de microéconomie & Principes de macroéconomie (in French). Modulo-Nelson.
- "Would higher tuition fees restrict access to university studies?", Montreal Economic Institute, June 2010, URL:
- "Viewpoint on measures for raising productivity in the public service", Montreal Economic Institute, March 2010, URL:
- "Think twice before going deeper into public debt: lessons from the Canadian experience", Montreal Economic Institute and Institut économique Molinari, February 2010 (with Valentin Petkantchin), URL:
