= Francine Descarries =

Canadian sociologist (1942–2026)

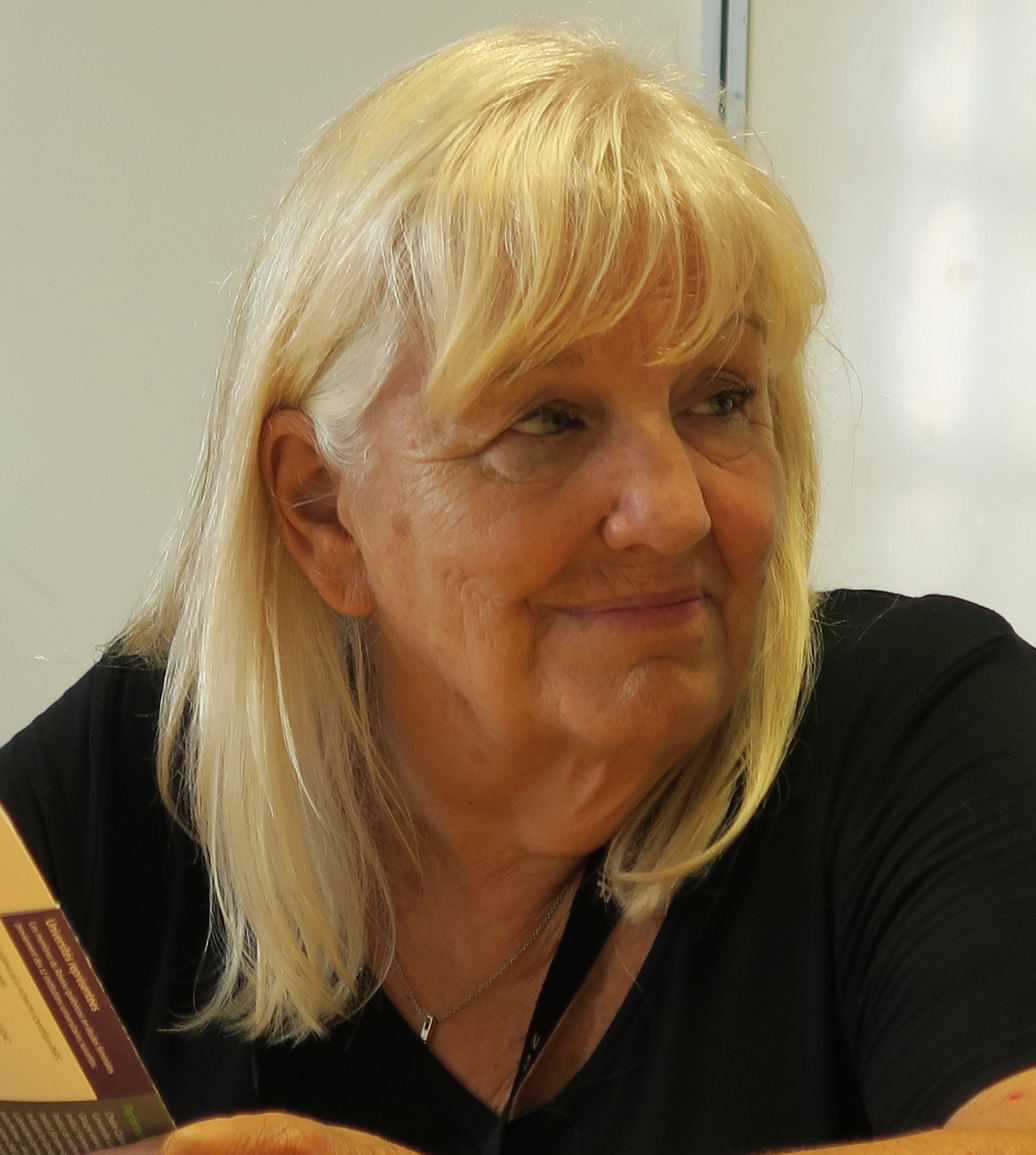
- Born: 1942; Montreal, Quebec, Canada
- Died: March 2026 (aged 84)

Academic background
- Education: Université de Montréal

Academic work
- Discipline: Sociology
- Institutions: Université du Québec à Montréal

Francine Descarries (1942 – 12 March 2026) was a Canadian sociologist. She was a professor of sociology at the Université du Québec à Montréal. Descarries is considered a leading figure in feminist studies in Quebec.

== Life and career ==
At the age of 16, after the death of her father, Descarries left school so that her family could afford her brother's medical training. Descarries found work as a legal secretary then as a travel agent, then left the workforce to care for her children. She returned to school at age 27, shortly after the birth of her second child. She attended Cégep Édouard-Montpetit. With a scholarly interest in women's issues and feminism, Descarries went on to earn undergraduate, master's, and doctoral degrees in sociology from the Université de Montréal.

In 1980, Descarries published L'École rose… et les cols roses (The pink school... and the pink collar), based on her master's research. The book addressed the sexual division of labour and social reproduction in workplaces and schools in Quebec.

In 1985, she joined the faculty at the Université du Québec à Montréal (UQAM). In 1990, she became a founding member of the Institute of Feminist Research and Studies at UQAM. Descarries served as the scientific committee director for the 7th International Congress of Feminist Research in Francophonie, held in Montreal in 2015.

Descarries's scholarly interests included feminist theory, the evolution of the women's movement in Quebec, family, and women in the workforce.

Descarries died on 12 March 2026, at the age of 84.

== Awards and honours ==
- 2012: Ursula Franklin Award in Gender Studies, Royal Society of Canada
- 2019: Prix Marie-Andrée-Bertrand, Prix du Québec, Government of Québec

== Selected works ==
=== Books ===
- Descarries-Bélanger, Francine (1980). L'école rose—et les cols roses: la reproduction de la division sociale des sexes (in French). Montréal: Éditions coopératives A. Saint-Martin. ISBN 978-2-89035-019-9.
- Robbins, Wendy; Luxton, Meg; Eichler, Margrit; Descarries, Francine (2009). Minds of Our Own: Inventing Feminist Scholarship and Women's Studies in Canada and Québec, 1966–76. Wilfrid Laurier Univ. Press. p. 348. ISBN 978-1-55458-774-2.

=== Articles ===
- Descarries, Francine; Corbeil, Christine (1994). "Entre discours et pratiques : l'révolution de la pensée féministe sur la maternité depuis 1960". Nouvelles Questions Féministes. 15 (1): 69–93. ISSN 0248-4951. JSTOR 40619565.
- Descarries, Francine (2003). "The Hegemony of the English Language in the Academy: The Damaging Impact of the Sociocultural and Linguistic Barriers on the Development of Feminist Sociological Knowledge, Theories and Strategies". Current Sociology. 51 (6): 625–636. doi:10.1177/00113921030516005. ISSN 0011-3921. S2CID 145498036.
- Descarries, Francine (2005). "L'antiféminisme " ordinaire "". Recherches Féministes. 18 (2): 137–151. doi:10.7202/012421ar. ISSN 0838-4479.
- Descarries, Francine (2011). "Le projet féministe à l'aube du XXIe siècle : un projet de libération et de solidarité qui fait toujours sens". Cahiers de recherche sociologique (30): 179–210. doi:10.7202/1002660ar. ISSN 1923-5771.
- Descarries, Francine (2014). "Language Is Not Neutral: The Construction of Knowledge in the Social Sciences and Humanities". Signs: Journal of Women in Culture and Society. 39 (3): 564–569. doi:10.1086/674347. ISSN 0097-9740. S2CID 146229148.
