= Longueuil City Council =

Type
- Type: City Council

Leadership
- Mayor: Catherine Fournier

Structure
- Seats: 18 Councillors and 1 mayor
- Political groups: Coalition Longueuil: 19

Elections
- Voting system: First Past the Post
- Last election: 2 November 2025
- Next election: 4 November, 2029

Meeting place
- Longueuil City Hall; Longueuil, QC

Longueuil City Council (in French: Conseil municipal de la Ville de Longueuil) is the governing body of the mayor–council government in the city of Longueuil on Montreal's south shore, located in the Montérégie region of Quebec, Canada.

Council meetings are held on the third Tuesday of every month at 7 p.m.

== Mayor ==
Mayors of the new city of Longueuil (2002-)
Mayor	Party	Term Began	Term Ended
Jacques Olivier	Parti municipal Rive-Sud	2001	2005
Claude Gladu	Parti municipal Rive-Sud	2005	2009
Caroline St-Hilaire	Action Longueuil	2009	2017
Sylvie Parent	Action Longueuil	2017	2021
Catherine Fournier	Coalition Longueuil	2021	present

== Composition ==
Borough	Components	Population (2006)	Borough President	City Councillors
Greenfield Park	Former city of Greenfield Park	17,458	Sylvain Joly	1
Saint-Hubert	Former city of Saint-Hubert	78,715	Alvaro Cueto Munoz	7
Le Vieux-Longueuil	Former cities of Lemoyne and Longueuil	138,179 p	Carl Lévesque	10

== Council President ==
Reine Bombo-Allara

== Councillors ==
As of the 2025 Longueuil municipal election

=== Le Vieux-Longueuil ===
District	Party	Councillor
Longueuil-Montréal-Sud	Coalition Longueuil	Sylvain Larocque
Saint-Charles	Coalition Longueuil	Lyette Bouchard
Fatima-Parcours-du-Cerf	Coalition Longueuil	Marc-Antoine Azouz
Parc-Michel-Chartrand	Coalition Longueuil	Jonathan Tabarah
Boisé-Du Tremblay	Coalition Longueuil	Lysa Bélaïcha
Boisé-Fonrouge	Coalition Longueuil	Reine Bombo-Allara
Georges-Dor	Coalition Longueuil	Nicola Grenon
Antoinette-Robidoux	Coalition Longueuil	Marie-Michèle Drolet
Coteau-Rouge	Coalition Longueuil	Carl Lévesque
LeMoyne-Jacques-Cartier	Coalition Longueuil	Frédéric Barbeau

=== Greenfield Park ===
Greenfield Park Borough Council
Title	Party	Councillor
City Councillor	Coalition Longueuil	Sylvain Joly
Borough Councillor 1	Coalition Longueuil	Éric Normandin
Borough Councillor 2	Coalition Longueuil	Christopher Keays

=== Saint-Hubert ===
District	Party	Councillor
Laflèche	Coalition Longueuil	Sophie Paquette
Boisé-Pilon	Coalition Longueuil	Chrep Lok
Vieux-Saint-Hubert-la Savane	Coalition Longueuil	Sylvain Lambert
Ruisseau-Massé	Coalition Longueuil	Florent Sabourin-Lefebvre
Parc-de-la-Cité	Coalition Longueuil	Affine Lwalalika
Croydon-Iberville	Coalition Longueuil	Alvaro Cueto
Maraîchers	Coalition Longueuil	Nathalie Delisle

== See also ==
- Longueuil
- Urban agglomeration of Longueuil
- Boroughs of Longueuil
- List of mayors of Longueuil
- Greenfield Park, Quebec
- Le Vieux-Longueuil
- Saint-Hubert, Quebec
