= Elodie Ghedin =

Parasitologist and a virologist

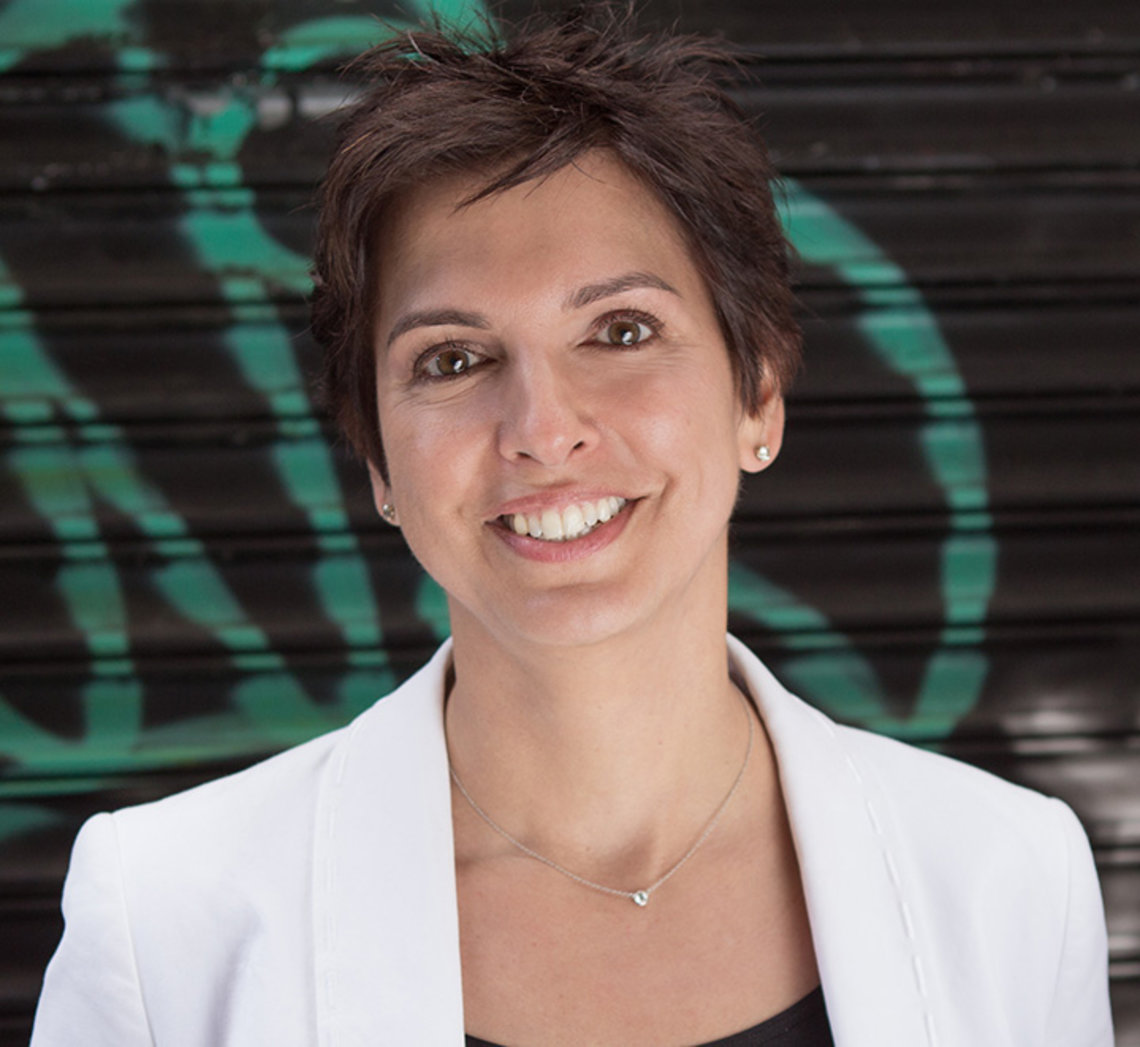
- Ghedin in 2016
- Born: 1967 (age 58–59)
- Education: McGill University; Université du Québec à Montréal
- Awards: MacArthur Fellow
- Scientific career
- Fields: parasitology, virology
- Workplaces: J. Craig Venter Institute; New York University; University of Pittsburgh School of Medicine

Elodie Ghedin (born 1967) is a Canadian parasitologist and virologist as well as a professor at the New York University Center for Genomics and Systems Biology. Her work focuses on the molecular biology and genomics of the parasites that cause diseases such as elephantiasis, and river blindness, and on the evolution of the influenza virus. She was named a 2011 MacArthur Fellow, a 2012 Kavli Frontier of Science Fellow, and a 2017 American Academy of Microbiology Fellow. She also was Awarded the Chancellor’s Distinguished Research Award in 2010.

== Education ==
Ghedin received two degrees from McGill University; a B.Sc. in Biology in 1989 and a Ph.D. focused on Molecular Parasitology in 1998. She received a M.Sc. in Environmental Sciences from the Université du Québec à Montréal in 1993. Between 1998 and 2000, she was a postdoctoral fellow at the National Institute of Allergy and Infectious Diseases. Elodie Ghedin continued her postdoctoral research with the Institute for Genomic Research (TIGR) in 2001.

== Career ==
Starting in 2000, she spent six years at the Institute for Genomic Research before joining the University of Pittsburgh School of Medicine in 2006 as an assistant professor in the Department of Computational and Systems Biology. She was formerly part of the J. Craig Venter Institute. During her time at the University of Pittsburgh School of Medicine Elodie Ghedin researched filarial nematodes. While she worked with this team they were able to sequence the genome of one of species filarial nematode. Filarial nematodes are parasitic worms that are transmitted through mosquito bites and if left untreated can cause a disease called elephantiasis. Elephantiasis (medically known as lymphatic filariasis) is a disease that causes extreme swelling of limbs often in the legs and feet.

She is currently a parasitologist and virologist at New York University's Center for Genomics & Systems Biology at the College of Global Public Health. Her research covers diverse topics in parasitology and virology, including the genetic diversity of flu strains. She has said: ‘A flu infection is not homogeneous, but rather a mix of strains that gets transmitted as a swarm. Ghedin said current flu vaccines target the dominant strains, because they are the ones that seem to infect the highest number of individuals, but they may miss minor strains, which can also pose a big threat. To examine the contribution of minor flu strains to outbreaks, Ghedin and her colleagues performed whole genome deep sequencing of upper nasal cavity swabs taken from confirmed 2009 Hong Kong flu cases and from their household contacts. Using sophisticated sequencing methods, the team could not only identify variants in flu strains, but also quantify what was being transmitted between infected individuals. Also while working at New York University, Elodie Ghedin was awarded a million-dollar grant from the National Institute of Allergy and Infectious Diseases to study Zika virus infections.

Her results showed that, as expected, most people carried the dominant virus—H1N1 or H3N2. But, in addition, all carried minor strains and variants of the major and minor strains. What was surprising was how readily these variants were transmitted across the studied individuals.

She has also noted that children, pregnant women, and people with obesity tend to have longer flu infections. Another collaborative study by Elodie Ghedin with Sara Lustigman of New York Blood Center, and Thomas Unnasch of The University of South Florida measured levels of RNA molecules in both B. malayi and Wolbachia throughout the lifecycles of male and female worms.

One of her current projects is to be a collaborator with the GoViral Project, a real time tracking system for cold and flu that aims to accurately track cases across the world.
