= Caroline St-Hilaire =

Canadian politician

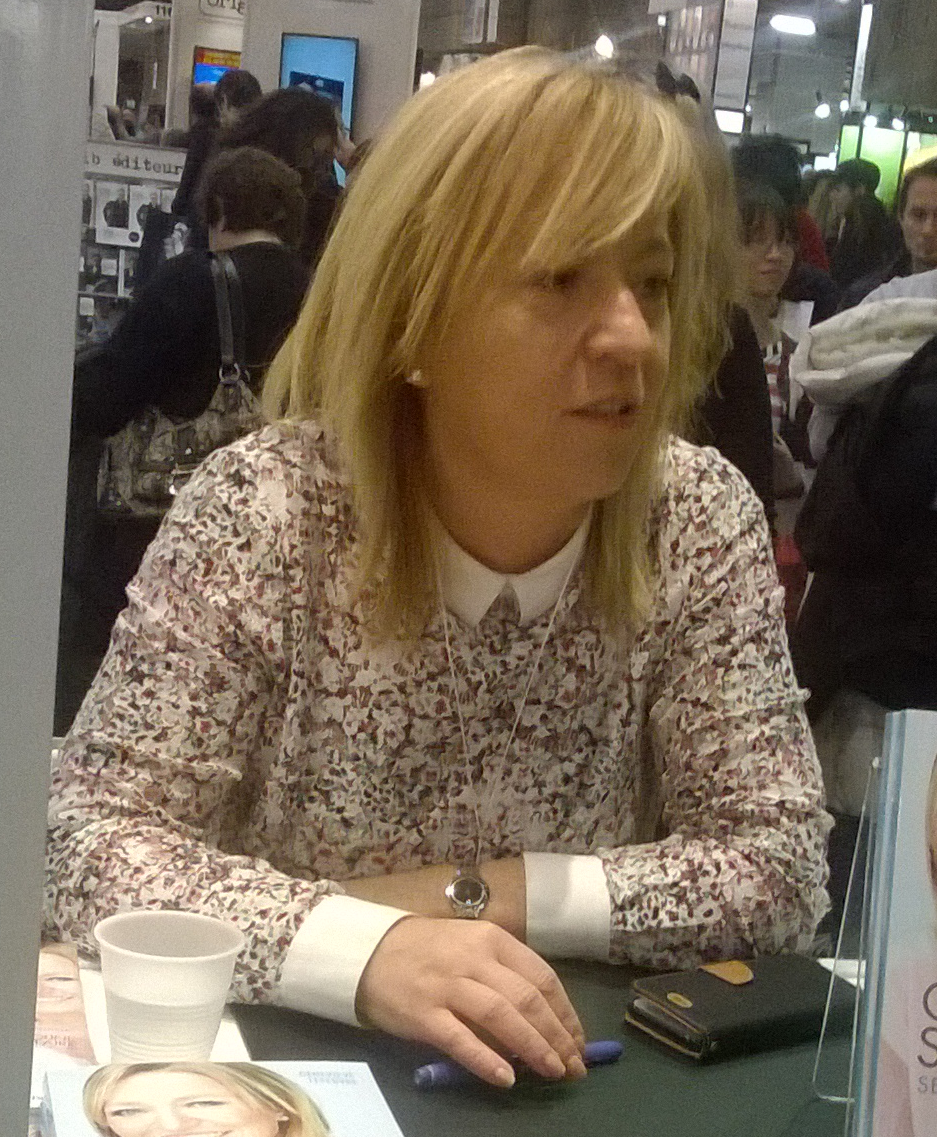
- Caroline St-Hilaire at Montreal, Quebec, Canada at the Salon du livre de Montréal 2017.

30th Mayor of Longueuil
- In office November 10, 2009 – November 5, 2017
- Preceded by: Claude Gladu
- Succeeded by: Sylvie Parent

MP for Longueuil—Pierre-Boucher
- In office June 2, 1997 – October 14, 2008
- Preceded by: Nic LeBlanc
- Succeeded by: Jean Dorion

Personal details
- Born: November 16, 1969 (age 56) Longueuil, Quebec
- Party: Bloc Québécois (federal); Coalition Avenir Québec (provincial); Action Longueuil (municipal)
- Spouse: Maka Kotto
- Children: Étienne, Louis-Félix
- Education: Université du Québec à Montréal
- Profession: executive manager/consultant

Caroline St-Hilaire (born November 16, 1969, in Longueuil, Quebec) is a Canadian politician, who served as Mayor of Longueuil under the banner of Action Longueuil from November 10, 2009, to November 5, 2017. She was previously a Member of Parliament, representing the Bloc Québécois for the riding of Longueuil—Pierre-Boucher.

In 2022, she ran as a Coalition Avenir Québec candidate in Sherbrooke for the provincial election, and lost to incumbent MNA Christine Labrie.

== Member of Parliament (1997–2008) ==
St-Hilaire was re-elected in the 2000 Canadian federal election and again in the 2004 Canadian federal election. She served as the Bloc's Deputy House leader from 2000 to 2004 and has served as the critic to the Status of Women, Amateur Sport, Persons with Disabilities and critic to the Minister of Transport. Her committee duties included the Government Operations and Estimates Committee as well as the Commons SubCommittee on International Human Rights where she served as the Vice Chair. In the 38th Parliament she served as the Vice Chair of the House Transport Committee.

An administrator, consultant and executive manager, she was first elected to the House of Commons of Canada in the 1997 Canadian federal election. She is a mother of two, Étienne and Louis-Félix.

On January 14, 2008, St-Hilaire announced she would not be seeking re-election in the 2008 election. The MP told a news conference in Longueuil she was looking forward to spending more time with her children. She said her partner, Bloc Québécois MP Maka Kotto's decision to run for the Parti Québécois in a provincial by-election played a role in her decision.

== Mayor of Longueuil (2009–2017) ==
On November 1, 2009, St-Hilaire was elected as mayor of Longueuil for the first time, defeating Jacques Goyette of the ruling Parti municipal Longueuil. She is also the current leader of the Longueuil municipal political party Action Longueuil.

St-Hilaire has expressed a strong dislike of the use of English in Longueuil council meetings and would like Bill 101 amended to prevent its use.

On July 1, 2016, St-Hilaire was expected to make a speech at the annual Canada Day parade in the Longueuil borough of Greenfield Park however she failed to show up. St-Hilaire is known for being an advocate for Quebec sovereignty.

== Electoral record (incomplete) ==
=== Federal ===
2000 Canadian federal election: Longueuil
Party	Candidate	Votes	%	±%	Expenditures
Bloc Québécois	Caroline St-Hilaire	20,868	52.25		$60,728
Liberal	Sophie Joncas	12,991	32.53		$45,206
Progressive Conservative	Richard Lafleur	2,210	5.53		$93
Alliance	Michel Minguy	2,066	5.17		$7,361
Marijuana	David Fiset	968	2.42		none listed
New Democratic	Timothy Spurr	655	1.64		none listed
Marxist–Leninist	Stéphane Chénier	183	0.46		$10
Total valid votes		39,941	100.00		
Total rejected ballots		1,181			
Turnout		41,122	59.66		
Electors on the lists		68,927			
Sources: Official Results, Elections Canada and Financial Returns, Elections Canada.

=== Provincial ===
2022 Quebec general election: Sherbrooke
Party	Candidate	Votes	%	±%
Québec solidaire	Christine Labrie	15,548	41.91	+7.64
Coalition Avenir Québec	Caroline St-Hilaire	13,076	35.25	+11.86
Parti Québécois	Yves Bérubé-Lauzière	3,373	9.09	-5.05
Conservative	Zoée St-Amand	2,501	6.74	–
Liberal	François Vaes	2,166	5.84	-18.83
Green	Victoria Karny	204	0.55	-0.63
Parti nul	Raphaëlle Dompierre	113	0.30	-0.09
Climat Québec	Alain Barbier	69	0.19	–
Démocratie directe	Alexandre Asselin	48	0.13	–
Total valid votes		37,098	–	
Total rejected ballots			–	
Turnout				
Electors on the lists			–	–

=== Municipal ===
2009 Longueuil municipal election
Party	Mayoral candidate	Vote	%
Action Longueuil	Caroline St-Hilaire	34,291	51.41%
Parti municipal de Longueuil	Jacques Goyette	30,504	45.74%
Total valid votes		64,795	100%
Rejected ballots		1,892	
