= Quebec Cancer Foundation =

Canadian non-profit organization

- Fondation québécoise du cancer
- Formation: 1979
- Founder: Michel Gélinas; Pierre Audet-Lapointe; Yvan Méthot; Maurice Falardeau; Pierre Band
- Founded at: Quebec
- Purpose: Providing support to cancer patients
- Headquarters: Montreal
- Affiliations: International Union against Cancer and The Quebec Cancer Coalition
- Website: fqc.qc.ca

The Quebec Cancer Foundation (French: Fondation québécoise du cancer) is a Quebec non-profit organization that aims to improve care to Quebecers suffering from cancer, enhance the quality of life for people with cancer and that their relatives, as well as to educate the population on the fight against cancer in Quebec. This foundation is present in Montreal, Quebec, Sherbrooke, Gatineau and Trois-Rivières. The Quebec Cancer Foundation is a member of the International Union against Cancer and the Coalition Priority Cancer in Quebec. The foundation mainly raises funds through donations and fundraising social activities and events. The Chairman of the Board of the foundation is Dr. Philippe Sauthier, MD as of July 5, 2023.

== History ==
The Foundation was founded in 1979 by doctors Michel Gélinas, Pierre Audet-Lapointe, Yvan Méthot, Maurice Falardeau, and Pierre Band. The co-founders aimed to reduce the gap between the care provided to cancer patients in Quebec and that offered elsewhere in Canada and abroad, while cancer was not yet recognized as a priority by the medical profession, specifically in Quebec. Marco Décelles is serving as the head of the organization as of 2021. Musician Guylaine Tanguay is acting as the spokesperson of the organization. In 2020, the University Hospital of Quebec announced its collaboration with The Quebec Cancer Foundation to support people suffering from cancer.
