= Ville Jacques-Cartier =

City in the South Shore of Montreal

Coordinates: 45°32′N 73°29′W

Ville Jacques-Cartier (French pronunciation: [vil ʒak kaʁtje]) was a city located on the south shore of Montreal, Quebec, Canada. It was named after Jacques Cartier, the founder of New France. Now a defunct municipality, its former territory makes about a third of the current city of Longueuil and 80% of Le Vieux-Longueuil borough.

== History ==
Created at the same time as Mackayville in 1947, the land of Jacques-Cartier corresponded to what had been left of the St-Antoine de Longueuil parish after Longueuil, Saint-Lambert, Saint-Hubert, Montréal-Sud, Greenfield Park and Mackayville seceded from the parish. In 1948, a distant section of Jacques-Cartier (disconnected from the rest of the town) went on to form an independent municipality under the name of Préville. In 1949, Jacques-Cartier lost another portion of its territory which became Ville LeMoyne.

Originally incorporated as a town, Jacques-Cartier gained the status of city in 1952. Jacques-Cartier grew extremely quickly, over-stretching its existing infrastructure. It lacked a sewer system and paved roads, and it was not uncommon to see free-ranging dogs in the city. Houses were built as soon as the owner had the materials required to make one. This led to a mishmash of buildings along its streets. It was known as the Wild West of Quebec.

Jacques-Cartier merged with the city of Longueuil on August 16, 1969. It was a voluntary merger decided by the mayors of the two cities and fully supported by the Government of Quebec who believed there was too many municipalities in the province anyway. The population, on the other hand, was strongly opposed in Jacques-Cartier and Longueuil alike especially because no referendum would be conducted to allow residents of either city to vote on the matter. Although Jacques-Cartier was at least four times larger and had twice the population of Longueuil, it was the latter's name that was retained for historic reasons. (Longueuil was a much older city than Jacques-Cartier. )

During its 22 years of existence, Jacques-Cartier gave birth to some of the most well-known establishments of Le Vieux-Longueuil borough, notably Collège Édouard-Montpetit in 1967, a secondary school named after Gérard Filion in 1963, and the current location of Pratt & Whitney Canada in 1951.

The city hall, police station and fire station of Jacques-Cartier were all located together in a building at the corner on Curé-Poirier boulevard and Brebeuf street. This site still serves as an office building for the modern city of Longueuil and also includes a fire station.

The South Shore Protestant Regional School Board previously served the municipality.

=== Mayors ===
Mayor	Term Began	Term Ended
Joseph-Rémi Goyette	1947	1949
René Prévost	1949	1954
Hector Desmarchais	1954	1955
Julien Lord	1955	1957
Joseph-Louis Chamberland	1957	1960
Léo-Aldéo Rémillard	1960	1963
Jean-Paul Tousignant (interim)	1963	1963
Charles Labrecque (interim)	1963	1963
Jean-Paul Vincent	1963	1966
Roland Therrien	1966	1969

== The area today ==
Today, the western part of what used to be Jacques-Cartier is primarily low-income, highly populated, retail-oriented and completely built-up. The architecture in this area can be defined as a mishmash and non-uniform, as buildings were usually constructed when the property owners had enough money to build them.

The eastern part, on the other hand, tends to be the opposite. It is by far less densely populated than its western counterpart and contains the industrial section of Longueuil. Recently-built designer mansions and condominiums are plentiful (notably in the Collectivité-Nouvelle and Parcours du Cerf neighbourhoods), and the area is becoming increasing built up.

The Fatima neighbourhood (which borders the city of Boucherville) is similar to the western part, with many houses and apartment buildings dating from Jacques-Cartier.

== Demographics ==
Historical populations
Year	Pop.	±%
1948	13,000	—
1951	22,450	+72.7%
1961	40,807	+81.8%
1966	52,336	+28.3%
1969	66,820	+27.7%

Jacques-Cartier was overwhelmingly francophone. It had twelve Catholic parishes at the time of its merger with Longueuil in 1969. The clergy played a large role in the success of the community. It ran various social organizations and was in charge of education in the city.

== Legacy ==
Cardboard City (Ville Jacques-Carton), a 2025 documentary-fiction hybrid film directed by André Forcier and Jean-Marc E. Roy, centred on the history of the community.

== See also ==
- List of former cities in Quebec
