= Le Courrier du Sud =

Canadian newspaper in Quebec

- Type: Weekly newspaper
- Format: Tabloid
- Owner: Gravité Média
- Founder: Jean-Paul Auclair
- Founded: 1947
- Language: French
- Headquarters: Longueuil, Quebec, Canada
- Circulation: 143,992 homes each week
- Sister newspapers: Le Reflet, La Relève, Le Soleil de Châteauguay, Le Journal Saint-François
- Website: Le Courrier du Sud (official website)

Le Courrier du Sud is a free French-language weekly tabloid newspaper based in Longueuil, Quebec, Canada. The newspaper is distributed online as well as in print at 400 drop-off points in the cities of Longueuil (boroughs of Le Vieux-Longueuil, Saint-Hubert and Greenfield Park), Brossard and Saint-Lambert. Le Courrier du Sud is owned by Gravité Média. It was established in 1947 by Jean-Paul Auclair in the former city of Montreal South as a bilingual newspaper (and was also known at the time as The South Courier).

Le Courrier du Sud covers local news, including politics, urban development, culture, crime, and other topics. It has won several awards, including first-place finishes at the Grands Prix des Hebdos in 2024 and in 2025.

Gravité Média also owns Le Courrier du Sud's sister publications, La Relève, Le Reflet, Le Soleil de Châteauguay and Le Journal Saint-François.
