= Urban agglomeration of Longueuil =

Coordinates: 45°32′N 73°31′W

- Urban agglomeration
- Quebec

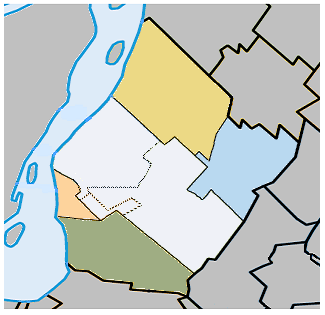
- Country: Canada
- Province: Quebec
- Region: Montérégie
- Incorporated: January 01, 2006
- Seat: Longueuil

Government
  - Type: Prefecture
  - Regional conference of elected officers: Monique Bastien (President)

Area
  - Land: 282.21 km^{2} (108.96 sq mi)

Population (2021)
  - Total: 436,785
  - Density: 1,546.7/km^{2} (4,006/sq mi)
  - Pop 2016-2021: ▲5.2%
  - Dwellings: 187,260
- Time zone: UTC-5 (Eastern)
  - Summer (DST): UTC-4 (EDT)
- Website: www.longueuil.ca

The urban agglomeration of Longueuil was created on January 1, 2006, as a result of the de-amalgamation process brought upon by the Charest government. It encompasses all the boroughs that were merged into the previous city of Longueuil in January 2002 and retains the same area as that mega-city.

The urban agglomeration of Longueuil is coextensive with the territory equivalent to a regional county municipality (TE) and census division (CD) of Longueuil, whose geographical code is 58.

== History ==
Longueuil merged on January 1, 2002 with the communities of Boucherville, Brossard, Greenfield Park, LeMoyne, Saint-Bruno-de-Montarville, Saint-Hubert, and Saint-Lambert. These cities became boroughs of the Longueuil megacity. Saint-Lambert and LeMoyne combined to become one borough called Saint-Lambert/LeMoyne. The former city of Longueuil was renamed Le Vieux-Longueuil borough.

The former city hall of Brossard, became the city hall for the new city of Longueuil.

On June 20, 2004, the former boroughs of Boucherville, Brossard, Saint-Bruno-de-Montarville and Saint-Lambert voted to demerge from Longueuil to reconstitute themselves as municipalities on January 1, 2006. The rest of the city stayed intact.

The decision of Saint-Lambert to depart from the city of Longueuil also met that the Saint-Lambert/LeMoyne borough would get disbanded. LeMoyne's small population and territory did not allow it to become a borough of its own. In 2005, the population of LeMoyne was given the choice to pick a new borough between Le Vieux-Longueuil, Saint-Hubert and Greenfield Park. Le Vieux-Longueuil ended up being the winner and absorbed LeMoyne into its borough on January 1, 2006.

Following the demergers, Longueuil relocated its city hall from Brossard to Saint-Hubert, where it is still located.

== Structure ==
According to the Act respecting the exercise of certain municipal powers in certain urban agglomerations, the cities and boroughs of the urban agglomeration of Longueuil are structured as follows:

=== Central municipality ===
- Ville de Longueuil
  - Borough of Le Vieux-Longueuil (which includes LeMoyne)
  - Borough of Greenfield Park
  - Borough of Saint-Hubert

=== Related municipalities ===
- Ville de Boucherville
- Ville de Brossard
- Ville de Saint-Bruno-de-Montarville
- Ville de Saint-Lambert

=== Population and representation by district ===
Cities and Boroughs of Longueuil Agglomeration (2016 census)
City/Borough	Population	Pct (%)	# of Representatives	# of council votes
Boucherville	41,671	10.0%	1	1.76
Brossard	85,721	20.7%	1	3.21
Longueuil	239,700	57.7%	6	10.63
Vieux-Longueuil	138,550	33.3%		
Saint-Hubert	84,420	20.2%		
Greenfield Park	16,735	4.0%		
Saint-Bruno-de-Montarville	26,394	6.3%	1	1.13
Saint-Lambert	21,861	5.3%	1	1
Total	415,347	100.0%	10	17.73

== Agglomeration powers ==
Under this new system of municipal organization, the agglomeration city and the reconstituted cities (in this case, Boucherville, Brossard, Saint-Bruno-de-Montarville and Saint-Lambert) share powers and responsibilities. The urban agglomeration is headed by an agglomeration council which exercises these agglomeration powers.

== Demographics ==
=== Population ===
Historical Census Data - Urban agglomeration of Longueuil, Quebec
Year	Pop.	±%
2001	371,934	—
2006	385,533	+3.7%
2011	399,097	+3.5%
2016	415,347	+4.1%

=== Language ===
Mother tongue from 2016 Canadian Census

Language	Population	Pct (%)
French only	295,710	71.96%
English only	29,350	7.14%
Both English and French	4,695	1.14%
Other languages	73,520	17.89%

== Transportation ==
=== Access Routes ===
Highways and numbered routes that run through the municipality, including external routes that start or finish at the county border:

- Autoroutes
  - A-10
  - A-15
  - A-20 (TCH)
  - A-25
  - A-30
- Principal Highways
  - R-112
  - R-116
  - R-132
  - R-134
- Secondary Highways:
  - None
- External Routes:
  - None

== See also ==
- Longueuil City Council
- Municipal reorganization in Quebec
- Urban agglomerations of Quebec
- Longueuil
- List of mayors of Longueuil
- Boroughs of Longueuil
- List of regional county municipalities and equivalent territories in Quebec
