= Longueuil =

City in Quebec, Canada

- City
- City of Longueuil; Ville de Longueuil
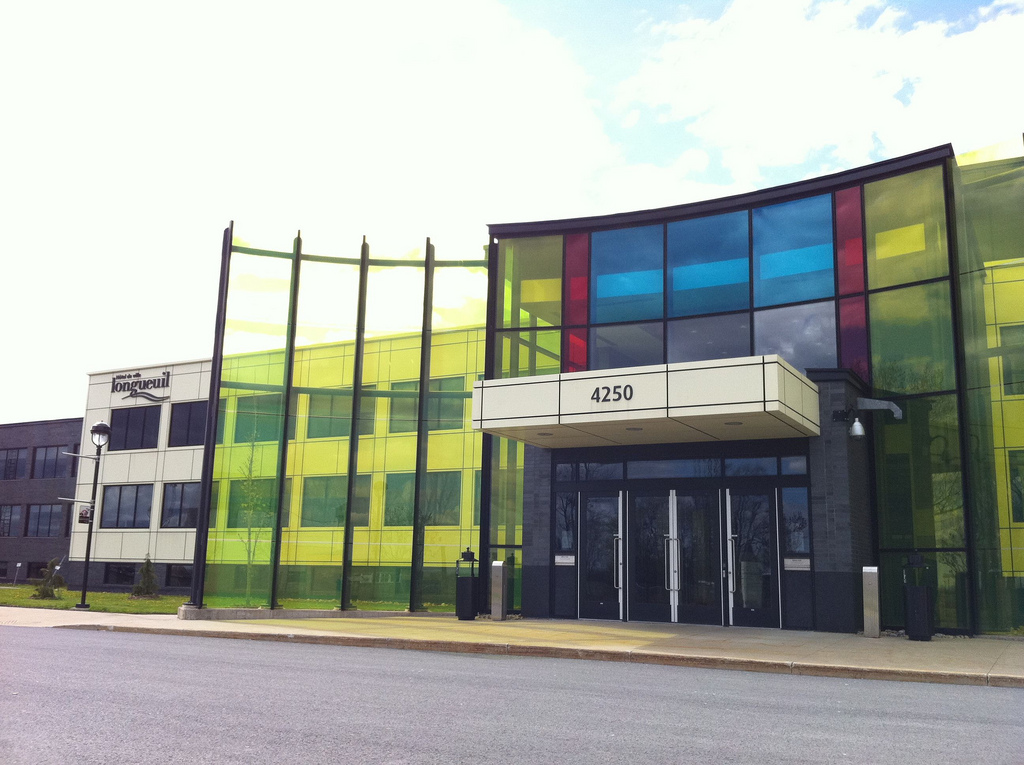
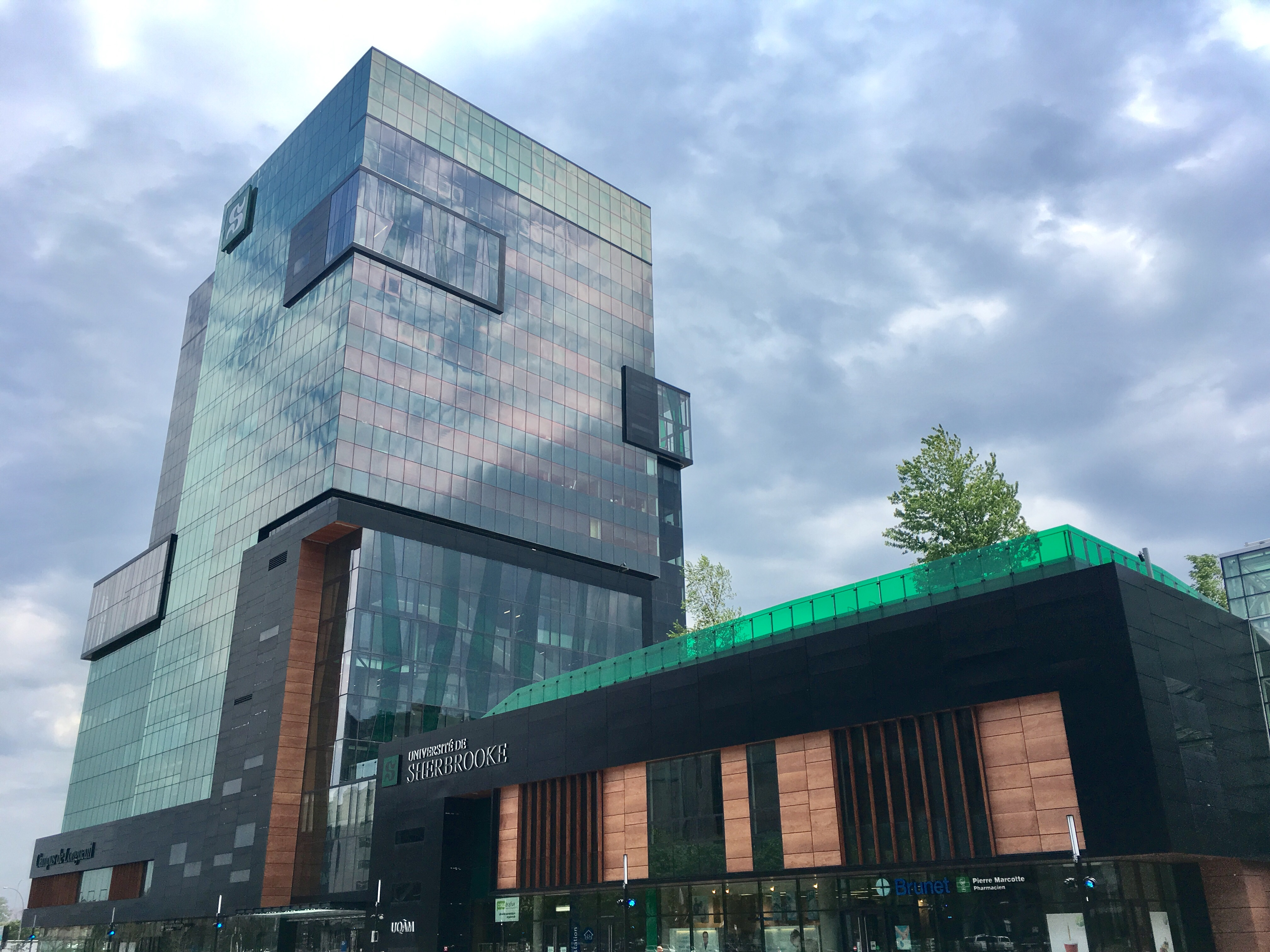
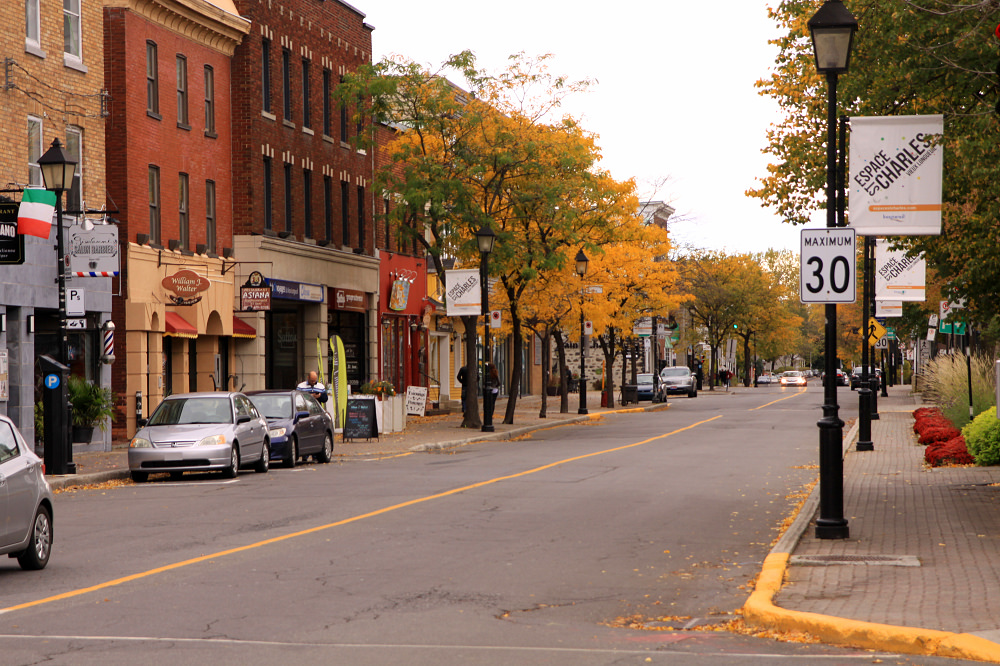
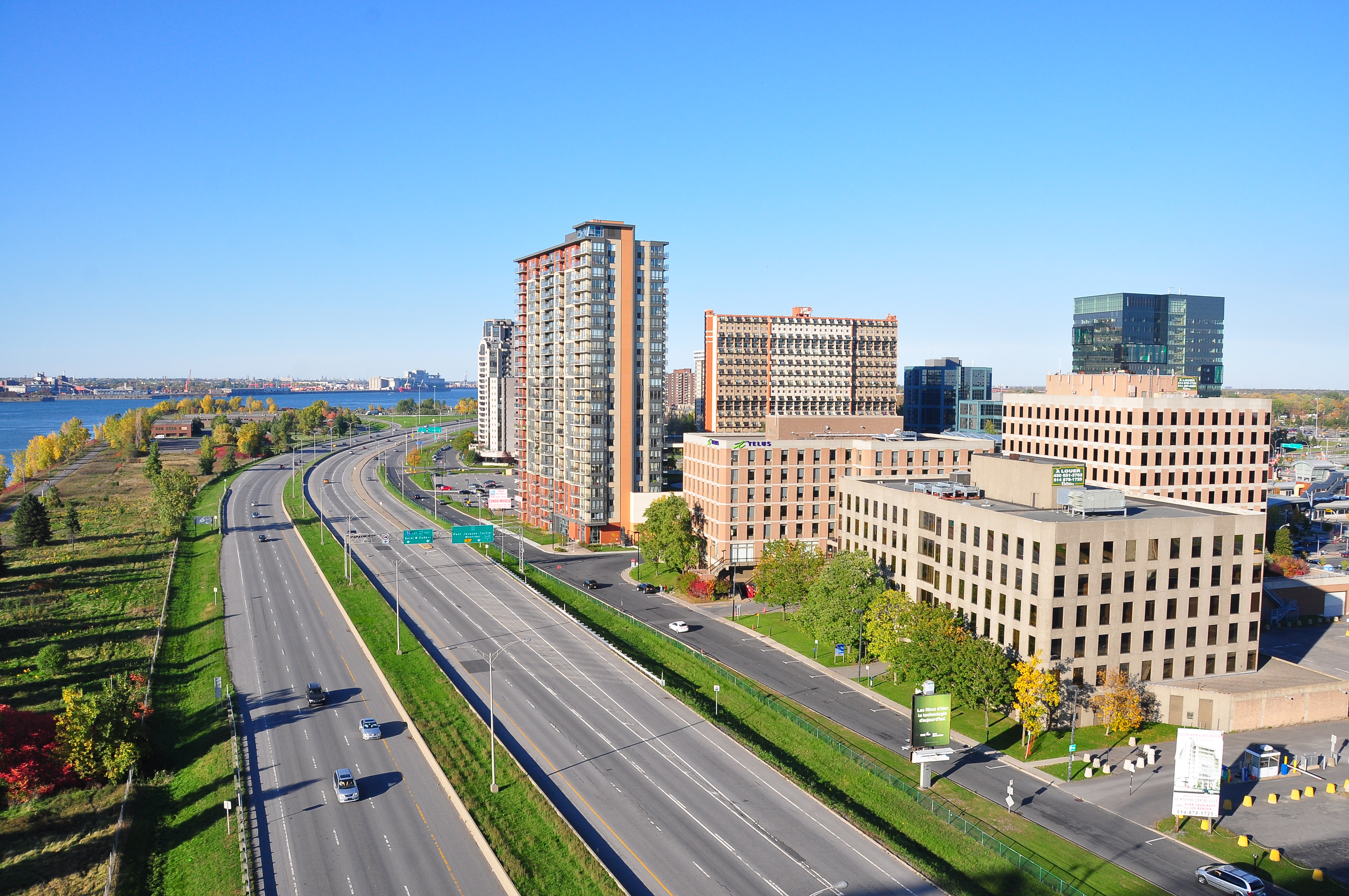
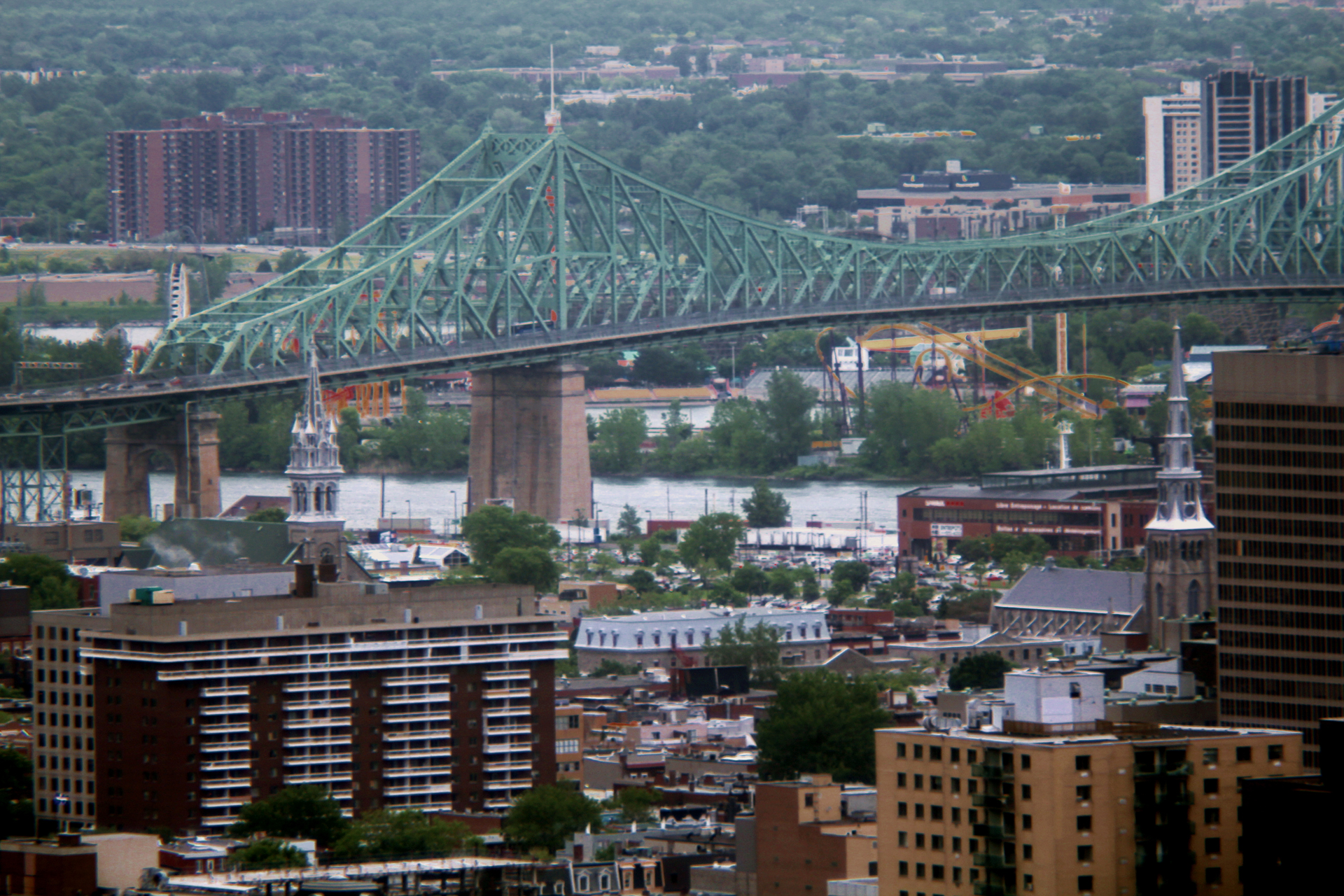
- Clockwise from top left: City Hall, Université de Sherbrooke, rue Saint-Charles, Jacques-Cartier Bridge and downtown.

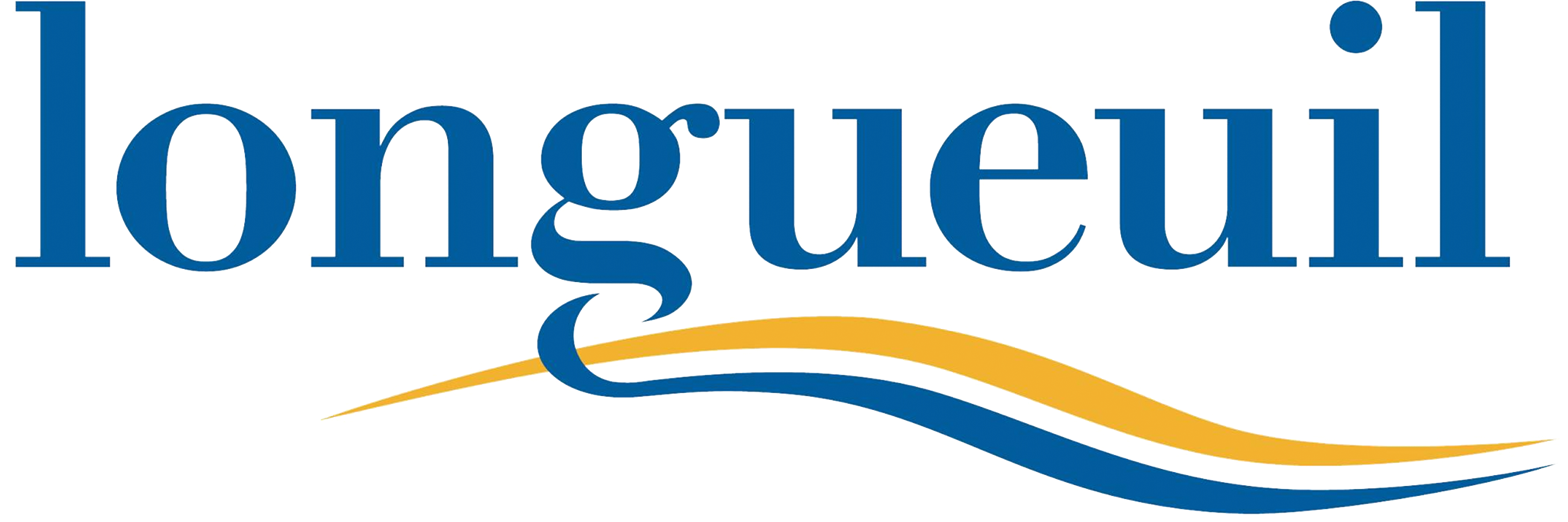
- Flag Coat of arms Logo
- Motto(s): "Labor et Concordia" (Latin) "Work and Harmony"
- Location in southern Quebec.
- Coordinates: 45°32′N 73°31′W
- Country: Canada
- Province: Quebec
- Region: Montérégie
- RCM: None
- Agglomeration: Longueuil
- Settled: 1657
- Constituted: January 1, 2002
- Boroughs: List: Greenfield Park; Le Vieux-Longueuil; Saint-Hubert

Government
  - Type: Longueuil City Council
  - Mayor: Catherine Fournier
  - MPs: Natilien Joseph (L); Bienvenu-Olivier Ntumba (L); Sherry Romanado (L)
  - MNAs: Shirley Dorismond (CAQ); Lionel Carmant (CAQ); Isabelle Poulet (CAQ); Ian Lafrenière (CAQ)

Area
  - Total: 122.64 km^{2} (47.35 sq mi)
  - Land: 115.17 km^{2} (44.47 sq mi)
  - Water: 7.47 km^{2} (2.88 sq mi) 6.1%

Population (2021)
  - Total: 254,483
  - Rank: 5th in Quebec
  - Density: 2,198.2/km^{2} (5,693/sq mi)
  - Pop 2016–2021: ▲6.1%
  - Dwellings: 117,006
- Time zone: UTC−5 (EST)
  - Summer (DST): UTC−4 (EDT)
- Postal code(s): J3Y, J3Z, J4G to J4N, J4T, J4V
- Area codes: 450 and 579
- Demonym: Longueuillois(e)
- Website: www.longueuil.quebec

Longueuil (French pronunciation: [lɔ̃ɡœj]) is a city in the province of Quebec, Canada. It is the seat of the Montérégie administrative region and the central city of the urban agglomeration of Longueuil. It sits on the south shore of the Saint Lawrence River directly across from Montreal. The population as of the Canada 2021 Census totalled 254,483, making it Montreal's second largest suburb, the fifth most populous city in Quebec and twentieth largest in Canada.

Charles Le Moyne founded Longueuil as a seigneurie in 1657. It would become a parish in 1845, a village in 1848, a town in 1874 and a city in 1920. Between 1961 and 2002, Longueuil's borders grew three times, as it was amalgamated with surrounding municipalities; there was a strong de-amalgamation in 2006 (see 2000–2006 municipal reorganization in Quebec).

Longueuil is a residential, commercial and industrial city. It incorporates some urban features, but is essentially a suburb. Longueuil can be classified as a commuter town as a large portion of its residents commute to work in Montreal. Most buildings are single-family homes constructed in the post-war period. The city consists of three boroughs: Le Vieux-Longueuil, Saint-Hubert and Greenfield Park.

Longueuil is the seat of the judicial district of Longueuil. Residents of the city are called Longueuillois.

== History ==
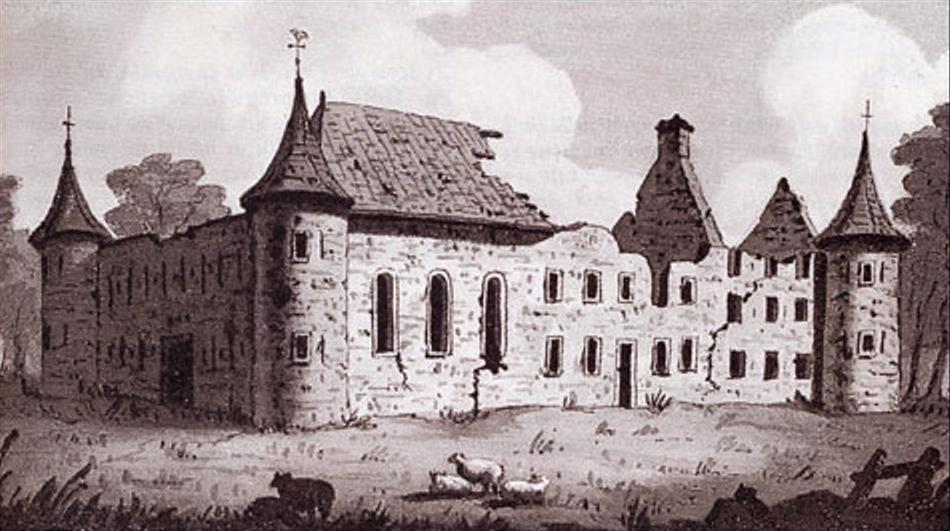
Ruins of Fort Longueuil in 1825.

The territory of New France was divided into seigneuries in order to ensure the colony's defence. Longueuil was founded in 1657 by Charles Le Moyne, a merchant from Ville-Marie (present day Montreal), as a seigneurie. According to Abbé Faillon, Charles Le Moyne, lord of the area starting in 1657, named Longueuil after the village of Longueil (note slightly different spelling) which is today the seat of a canton in the district of Dieppe in his homeland of Normandy.

His son, Charles Le Moyne de Longueuil, built Fort Longueuil as his fortified residence. It was constructed of stone between 1685 and 1690 and had four towers.

Fort Longueuil was believed to be occupied by American troops during the American Revolutionary War. It was subsequently occupied by the British. It was demolished in 1810 due to its poor condition. The archaeological remains of Fort Longueuil were recognized as a National Historic Site of Canada on May 25, 1923. The site extends beneath the present-day Saint-Antoine-de-Padoue Cathedral.

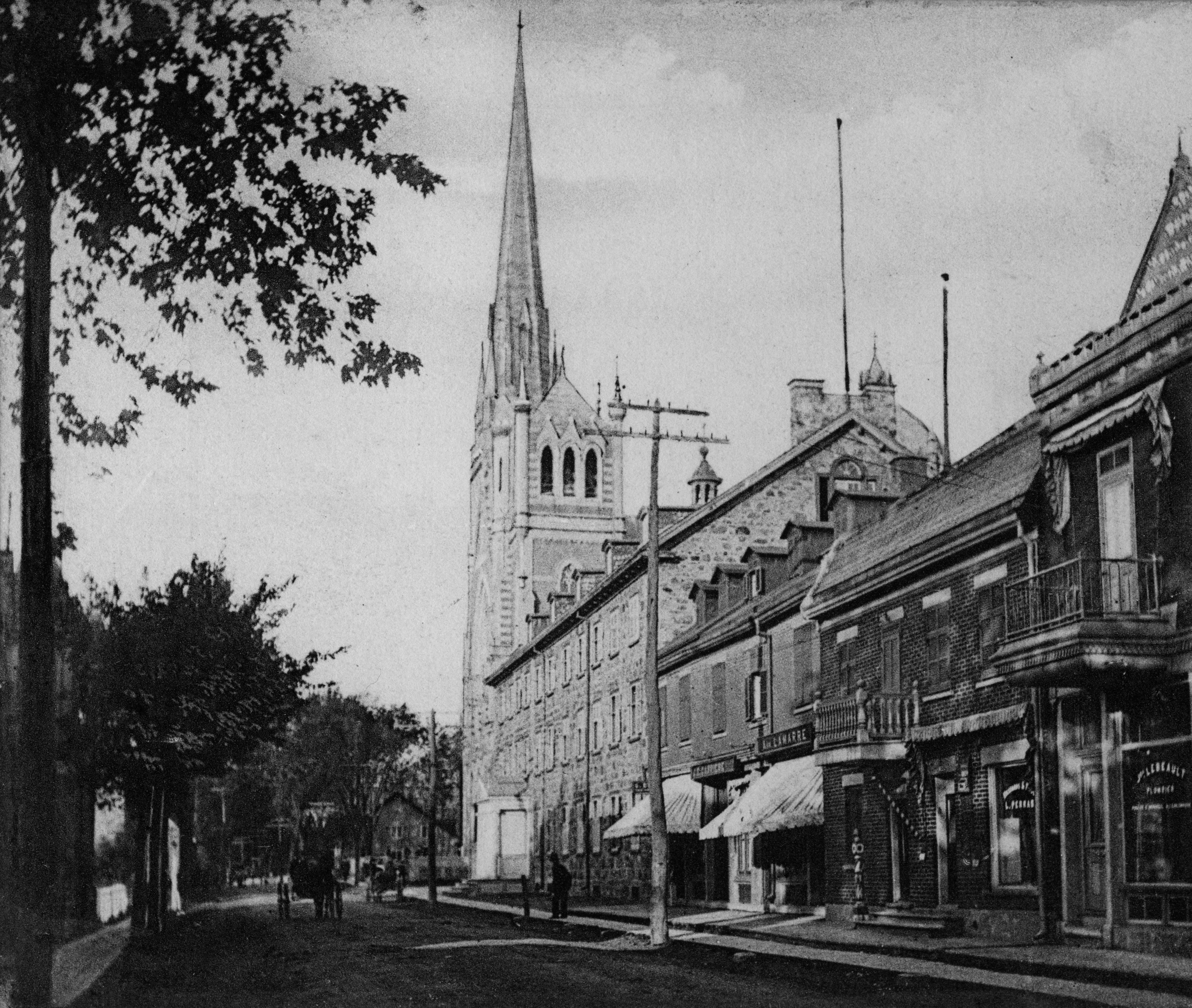
The Co-Cathedral of Saint-Antoine-de-Padoue and Rue St. Charles, Longueuil, QC, about 1910

The seigneurial system ended in 1845 and Longueuil was turned into a parish municipality named Saint-Antoine-de-Longueuil. In 1848, a portion detached from the parish and officially established as the village of Longueuil. This same village became a town in 1874, and then a city in 1920. Musician Paul Pratt notably served as the city's mayor from 1935 to 1966.

Former flag of Longueuil, used from 1967 to 2004

Longueuil's city limits expanded for the first time in 1961 when it merged with Montréal-Sud, and again in 1969 when it merged with Ville Jacques-Cartier. In both cases, Longueuil was chosen as the name of the new city.

On January 1, 2002, as part of the 2000–2006 municipal reorganization in Quebec, the provincial government amalgamated the former Longueuil with Boucherville, Brossard, Greenfield Park, LeMoyne, Saint-Bruno-de-Montarville, Saint-Hubert and Saint-Lambert. As with the 1960s, the name Longueuil was chosen for the new city. However, after a change of government and a 2004 referendum, Boucherville, Brossard, Saint-Lambert and Saint-Bruno-de-Montarville were re-constituted as independent cities on January 1, 2006. As such, the current city of Longueuil now includes only the former cities of Longueuil (1969–2001), Saint-Hubert, Greenfield Park, and LeMoyne.

== Geography ==
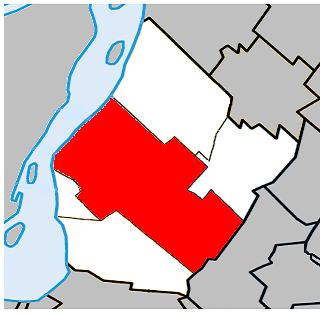
Location of the city of Longueuil within the Urban Agglomeration of Longueuil.

Longueuil occupies 115.59 square kilometres (44.6 sq mi) of land. The city is bordered by the cities of Saint-Lambert to the west, Brossard to the southwest, Boucherville to the northeast, Saint-Bruno-de-Montarville to the east, and the Saint Lawrence River and Montreal to the northwest. The city of Longueuil is located approximately 7 kilometres (5 mi) east of Montreal on the south shore of the Saint Lawrence River.

Longueuil is located in the Saint Lawrence River valley, and is a vast plain. Areas near the river were originally swamp land with mixed forest, and later prime agricultural land. Agricultural land still exists in the portions of the city furthest from the river.

The city of Longueuil also includes Île Charron, a small island in the Saint Lawrence River, and part of the Boucherville Islands.

Street addresses in Longueuil increase west and east from the Chemin de Chambly, with suffixes of "Ouest" and "Est" used on east–west streets that cross it, and south from the Saint Lawrence River. (As in Montreal, the local cardinal directions are skewed to align with the shore of the river, and local grid "north" is closer to geographic northwest.)

=== Climate ===
Like Montreal, Longueuil is classified as humid continental or hemiboreal (Köppen climate classification Dfb). Longueuil has long winters, lasting from November to March, short springs during April and May, average summers, lasting from June to August, and short autumns during September and October.

Climate data for Montréal/Saint-Hubert Airport (1981–2010)
Month	Jan	Feb	Mar	Apr	May	Jun	Jul	Aug	Sep	Oct	Nov	Dec	Year
Record high humidex	15.4	15.5	23.4	34.7	38.7	47.2	46.2	46.9	41.8	34.5	24.9	18.0	47.2
Record high °C (°F)	13.9 (57.0)	15.3 (59.5)	23.7 (74.7)	30.6 (87.1)	33.3 (91.9)	35.0 (95.0)	35.6 (96.1)	35.6 (96.1)	33.8 (92.8)	28.9 (84.0)	22.8 (73.0)	17.1 (62.8)	35.6 (96.1)
Mean daily maximum °C (°F)	−5.6 (21.9)	−3.2 (26.2)	2.3 (36.1)	11.3 (52.3)	19.1 (66.4)	23.8 (74.8)	26.3 (79.3)	25.4 (77.7)	20.5 (68.9)	13.0 (55.4)	5.6 (42.1)	−1.5 (29.3)	11.4 (52.5)
Daily mean °C (°F)	−10.4 (13.3)	−8.2 (17.2)	−2.5 (27.5)	5.7 (42.3)	12.9 (55.2)	17.9 (64.2)	20.6 (69.1)	19.5 (67.1)	14.7 (58.5)	7.9 (46.2)	1.5 (34.7)	−5.8 (21.6)	6.2 (43.1)
Mean daily minimum °C (°F)	−15.1 (4.8)	−13.1 (8.4)	−7.3 (18.9)	0.1 (32.2)	6.7 (44.1)	11.9 (53.4)	14.8 (58.6)	13.6 (56.5)	8.8 (47.8)	2.7 (36.9)	−2.6 (27.3)	−10.1 (13.8)	0.9 (33.6)
Record low °C (°F)	−36.1 (−33.0)	−37.2 (−35.0)	−36.1 (−33.0)	−15.0 (5.0)	−4.4 (24.1)	0.0 (32.0)	4.9 (40.8)	1.7 (35.1)	−4.9 (23.2)	−8.9 (16.0)	−22.8 (−9.0)	−37.2 (−35.0)	−37.2 (−35.0)
Record low wind chill	−49.0	−46.0	−40.0	−26.0	−10.0	0	0	0	−6.0	−14.0	−30.0	−45.0	−49.0
Average precipitation mm (inches)	75.8 (2.98)	61.9 (2.44)	71.6 (2.82)	82.7 (3.26)	81.7 (3.22)	87.3 (3.44)	96.8 (3.81)	88.3 (3.48)	84.5 (3.33)	87.0 (3.43)	104.3 (4.11)	88.8 (3.50)	1,010.7 (39.82)
Average rainfall mm (inches)	26.4 (1.04)	22.8 (0.90)	33.9 (1.33)	67.8 (2.67)	81.5 (3.21)	97.3 (3.83)	96.8 (3.81)	88.3 (3.48)	84.5 (3.33)	85.3 (3.36)	84.4 (3.32)	39.4 (1.55)	808.4 (31.83)
Average snowfall cm (inches)	52.0 (20.5)	39.0 (15.4)	36.5 (14.4)	13.4 (5.3)	0.2 (0.1)	0 (0)	0 (0)	0 (0)	0 (0)	1.4 (0.6)	18.0 (7.1)	48.8 (19.2)	209.3 (82.6)
Average precipitation days (≥ 0.2 mm)	17.4	13.8	14.2	13.4	13.7	12.4	12.4	11.5	10.8	13.1	15.6	16.3	164.6
Average rainy days (≥ 0.2 mm)	4.5	4.5	7.5	11.7	13.7	12.2	12.3	11.5	10.8	12.7	12.3	6.0	119.7
Average snowy days (≥ 0.2 cm)	15.4	11.8	9.3	3.5	0.14	0	0	0	0	0.74	5.7	12.9	59.48
Source: Environment Canada

== Demographics ==
Longueuil
Year	Pop.	±%
1851	1,496	—
1861	2,816	+88.2%
1871	2,083	−26.0%
1881	2,355	+13.1%
1891	2,757	+17.1%
1901	2,835	+2.8%
1911	3,972	+40.1%
1921	4,682	+17.9%
1931	5,407	+15.5%
1941	7,087	+31.1%
1951	11,103	+56.7%
1956	14,332	+29.1%
1961	24,131	+68.4%
1966	25,593	+6.1%
1971	97,590	+281.3%
1976	122,429	+25.5%
1981	124,320	+1.5%
1986	125,441	+0.9%
1991	129,808	+3.5%
1996	127,977	−1.4%
2001	128,016	+0.0%
2006	229,230	+79.1%
2011	231,409	+1.0%
2016	239,700	+3.6%
2021	254,483	+6.2%

Historical populations (including annexed territories)
Year	Pop.	±%
1871	3,977	—
1881	4,488	+12.8%
1891	4,895	+9.1%
1901	5,204	+6.3%
1911	6,984	+34.2%
1921	11,521	+65.0%
1931	14,094	+22.3%
1941	18,165	+28.9%
1951	58,012	+219.4%
1956	83,584	+44.1%
1961	106,166	+27.0%
1966	129,944	+22.4%
1971	157,986	+21.6%
1976	197,767	+25.2%
1981	209,557	+6.0%
1986	215,583	+2.9%
1991	226,965	+5.3%
1996	227,408	+0.2%
2001	225,761	−0.7%
2006	229,330	+1.6%
2011	231,409	+0.9%
2016	239,700	+3.6%
2021	254,483	+6.2%

In the 2021 Census of Population conducted by Statistics Canada, Longueuil had a population of 254,483 living in 113,086 of its 117,006 total private dwellings, a change of 6.1% from its 2016 population of 239,897. With a land area of 115.77 km^{2} (44.70 sq mi), it had a population density of 2,198.2/km^{2} (5,693.3/sq mi) in 2021.

Canada census – Longueuil community profile

	2021	2016	2011
Population	254,483 (+6.1% from 2016)	239,700 (+3.6% from 2011)	231,409 (+0.9% from 2006)
Land area	115.77 km^{2} (44.70 sq mi)	115,785 km^{2} (44,705 sq mi)	115.59 km^{2} (44.63 sq mi)
Population density	2,198.2/km^{2} (5,693/sq mi)	2,070.9/km^{2} (5,364/sq mi)	2,002.0/km^{2} (5,185/sq mi)
Median age	41.6 (M: 40.4, F: 42.4)	41.9 (M: 40.7, F: 43.4)	41.9 (M: 40.4, F: 43.5)
Private dwellings	117,006 (total)	110,761 (total)	106,499 (total)
Median household income	$71,500	$58,626	$58,317

References: 2021 2016 2011

Of the 147,805 workers in Longueuil, the median income was $36,400, which is above Quebec's provincial average of $36,000. Among the 69,945 full-time workers, the median income was $58,000 or slightly below the provincial average. Several of Montreal's most impoverished neighborhoods are located in Longueuil.

=== Language ===
As of the 2021 Canadian Census, French was the mother tongue language of 71.9% of Longueuil's residents while English was the first language of 5.8%. Other languages were spoken by 17.8% of the population, with the most spoken being Spanish (4.5%), Arabic (2.9%), Romanian (0.9%), Haitian Creole (0.9%), Portuguese (0.8%), Mandarin (0.8%), Russian (0.7%) and Dari (0.7%). These figures include multiple responses.

Mother tongue language
Canada Census Mother Tongue - Longueuil, Quebec
Census	Total	French			English			French & English			Other		
Year	Responses	Count	Trend	Pop %	Count	Trend	Pop %	Count	Trend	Pop %	Count	Trend	Pop %
2021	251,825	181,075	▼0.89%	71.9%	14,565	▲4.78%	5.8%	4,460	▲79.47%	1.8%	44,810	▲30.6%	17.8%
2016	237,665	182,705	▲0.49%	76.9%	13,900	▼1.8%	5.8%	2,485	▲0.1%	1.0%	34,310	▲22.1%	14.4%
2011	229,550	181,800	▲0.0005%	79.2%	14,155	▼8.05%	6.2%	2,460	▲37.05%	1.1%	28,115	▲0.97%	12.3%
2006	226,820	181,790	▼1.40%	80.2%	15,395	▲10.87%	6.8%	1,795	▼4.5%	0.8%	27,845	▲56.86%	12.3%
2001	218,810	184,380	▲0.39%	84.3%	13,885	▼17.22%	6.4%	1,880	▼17.74%	0.9%	17,795	▲5.95%	8.1%
1996	220600	183,065	n/a	83.0%	16,775	n/a	7.6%	2,285	n/a	1.0%	16,795	n/a	7.6%

Top 20 languages Longueuil, 2021	Population	%
French	181,075	71.9
English	14,565	5.8
Spanish	11,300	4.5
Arabic	7,230	2.9
Romanian	2,235	0.9
Haitian Creole	2,195	0.9
Portuguese	1,950	0.8
Mandarin	1,910	0.8
Russian	1,800	0.7
Dari	1,660	0.7
Kabyle	1,115	0.4
Vietnamese	1,065	0.4
Yue	1,005	0.4
Italian	985	0.4
Iranian Persian	640	0.3
Creole	490	0.2
Greek	485	0.2
Wolof	395	0.2
Morisyen	375	0.1
Bulgarian	280	0.1

=== Ethnicity ===
Ethnic Origin (2021)
Ethnic Origin	Population	Percent
Canadian	60,585	24.2%
French	54,350	21.7%
Québécois	27,500	11%
French Canadian	14,095	5.6%
Irish	11,950	4.8%
Haitian	8,780	3.5%
Italian	7,930	3.2%
Scottish	5,380	2.1%
English	4,825	1.9%
Arab	4,805	1.9%
Chinese	4,710	1.9%
African	4,425	1.7%
First Nations	3,830	1.5%

People of European origins made up 73.4% of the population in 2021. The largest visible minority groups are Black (9.9%), Latin American (4.6%), Arab (4.4%), Chinese (1.7%), Indigenous (1.3%), and West Asian (1.1%).

Panethnic groups in the City of Longueuil (2001−2021)
Panethnic group	2021		2016		2011		2006		2001	
Panethnic group	Pop.	%	Pop.	%	Pop.	%	Pop.	%	Pop.	%
European (Note: Statistic includes all persons that did not make up part of a visible minority or an indigenous identity.)	183,935	73.45%	188,900	80.4%	193,360	84.82%	198,620	87.57%	116,660	92.03%
African	24,910	9.95%	16,510	7.03%	10,500	4.61%	9,230	4.07%	3,520	2.78%
Middle Eastern (Note: Statistic includes total responses of "West Asian" and "Arab" under visible minority section on census.)	13,880	5.54%	9,360	3.98%	6,565	2.88%	4,750	2.09%	1,865	1.47%
Latin American	11,400	4.55%	7,355	3.13%	5,810	2.55%	4,580	2.02%	1,205	0.95%
East Asian (Note: Statistic includes total responses of "Chinese", "Korean", and "Japanese" under visible minority section on census.)	4,870	1.94%	3,700	1.57%	3,235	1.42%	3,030	1.34%	1,070	0.84%
Southeast Asian (Note: Statistic includes total responses of "Filipino" and "Southeast Asian" under visible minority section on census.)	3,550	1.42%	3,100	1.32%	3,085	1.35%	2,865	1.26%	1,280	1.01%
Indigenous	3,255	1.3%	2,440	1.04%	2,230	0.98%	1,360	0.6%	420	0.33%
South Asian	2,605	1.04%	1,895	0.81%	2,085	0.91%	1,610	0.71%	480	0.38%
Other/Multiracial (Note: Statistic includes total responses of "Visible minority, n.i.e." and "Multiple visible minorities" under visible minority section on census.)	2,035	0.81%	1,690	0.72%	1,105	0.48%	770	0.34%	265	0.21%
Total responses	250,430	98.41%	234,955	98.02%	227,970	98.51%	226,820	98.91%	126,760	99.02%
Total population	254,483	100%	239,700	100%	231,409	100%	229,330	100%	128,016	100%
Note: Totals greater than 100% due to multiple origin responses

== Economy ==
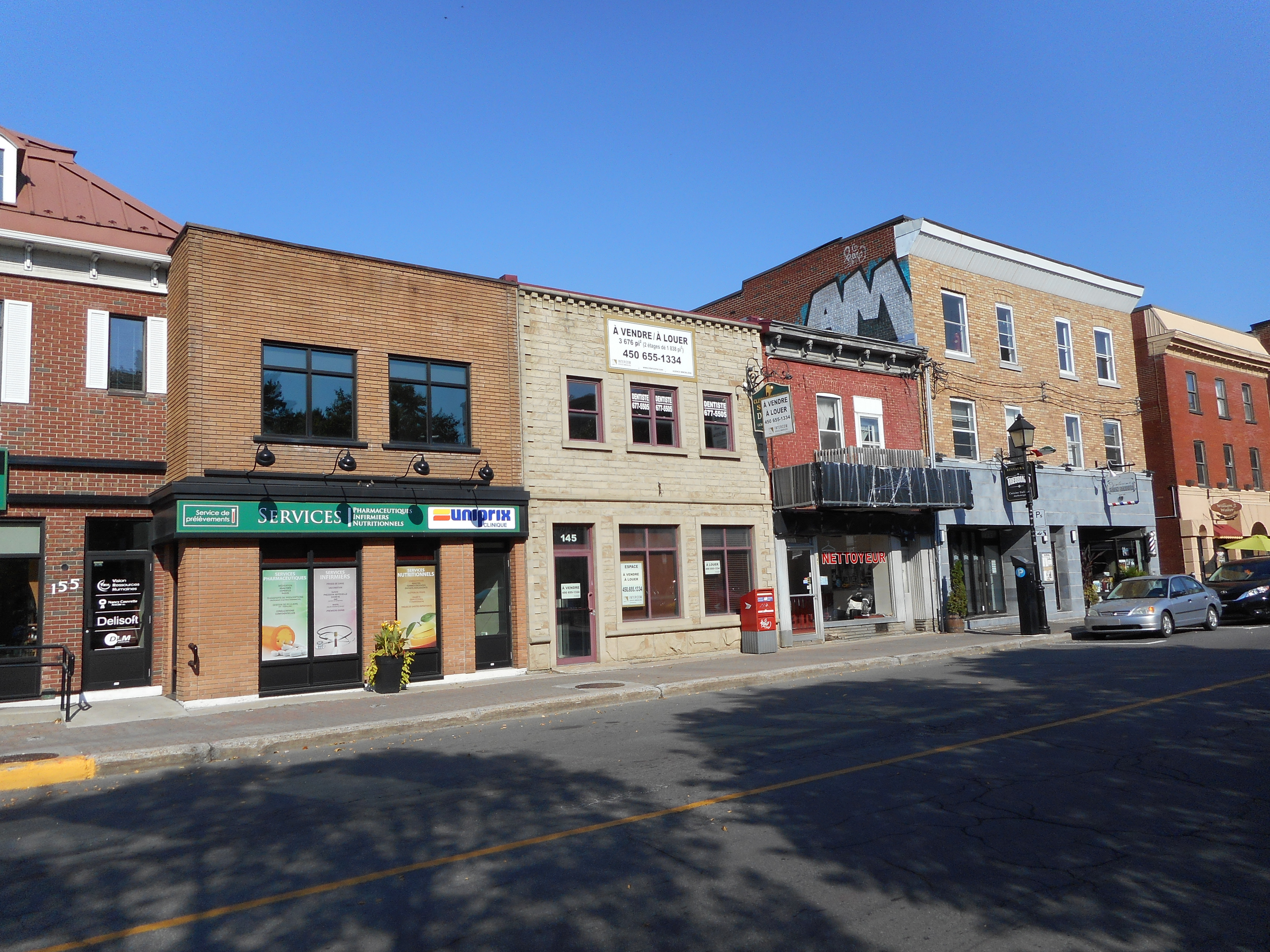
Old Longueuil

Longueuil is particularly strong in the aerospace industry. It is home to the headquarters of both Pratt & Whitney Canada and Héroux-Devtek. Pratt & Whitney Canada is Longueuil's top employer with 5,000 employees, while Héroux-Devtek has 550 employees. Also located in Longueuil is the headquarters of the Canadian Space Agency (John H. Chapman Space Center), adjacent to Montréal/Saint-Hubert Airport. Pascan Aviation has its headquarters in Saint-Hubert. Other companies based in Longueuil include Agropur, Innergex Renewable Energy, EBOX and the Canadian subsidiary of Hasbro.

In 2002 Artemano Canada, a home furnishing company was founded, with warehouse & distribution centre located in Longueuil. In 2008, Canadian Business ranked Longueuil as the 30th best place to do business in Canada.

== Arts and culture ==
The Longueuil International Percussion Festival, which features 500 musicians, takes place over six days in July in the neighbourhood of Old Longueuil, and draws 200,000 visitors per year.

== Attractions ==
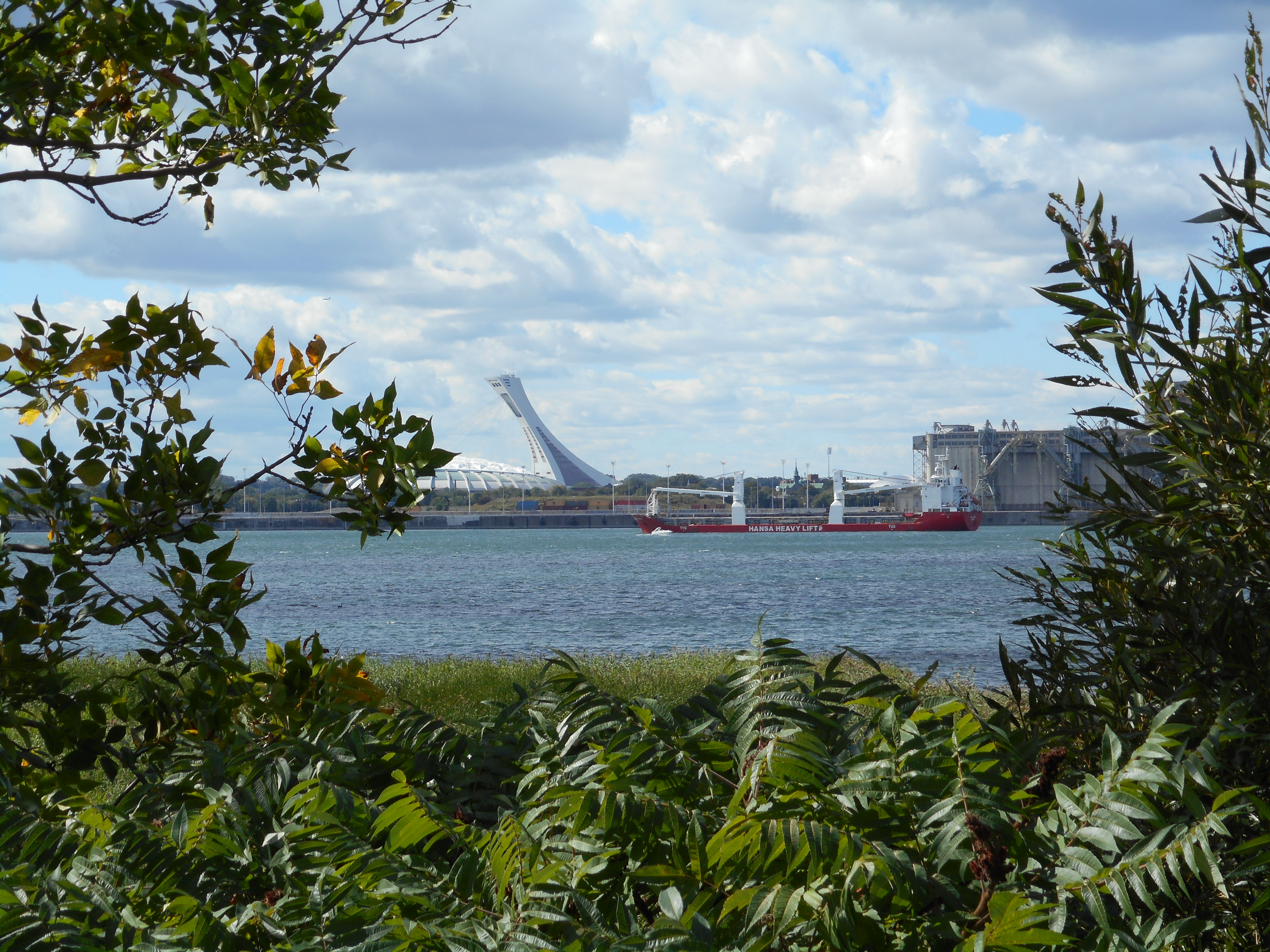
Marie-Victorin Park, Longueuil. The Montreal Olympic stadium can be seen in the distance

There are three nature parks in Longueuil, Parc Marie-Victorin and Parc Michel-Chartrand in Le Vieux-Longueuil and Parc de la Cité in Saint-Hubert. It is also home to a wildlife reserve, the Boisé du Tremblay, which is partially in Le Vieux-Longueuil and partially in Boucherville.

There are seven arenas: Cynthia Coull Arena in Greenfield Park; Aréna Émile-Butch-Bouchard, Aréna Jacques-Cartier, Aréna Olympia and Colisée Jean Béliveau in Le Vieux-Longueuil; and Centre sportif Gaétan-Boucher and Centre sportif Rosanne-Laflamme in Saint-Hubert.

Notable places of worship include the Roman Catholic Co-Cathedral of Saint-Antoine-de-Padoue, the Église Nouvelle vie evangelical church, Saint-Hubert Church, and the Montréal Québec Temple of the Church of Jesus Christ of Latter-day Saints.

== Sport ==
Sports teams based in Longueuil
Team	Sport	League	Venue
Collège Édouard-Montpetit Lynx	Women's ice hockey	Hockey collégial féminin RSEQ	Aréna Émile Butch Bouchard
CS Longueuil	Soccer	Première ligue de soccer du Québec	Centre Multi-Sport
Le Collège Français de Longueuil	Ice hockey	Quebec Junior AAA Hockey League	Colisée Jean Béliveau
Longueuil Ducs	Baseball	Ligue de Baseball Élite du Québec	Parc Paul-Pratt
South Shore JR Bruizers	Canadian football	Quebec Junior Football League	Parc Rosanne Laflamme

== Government ==
=== Municipal ===
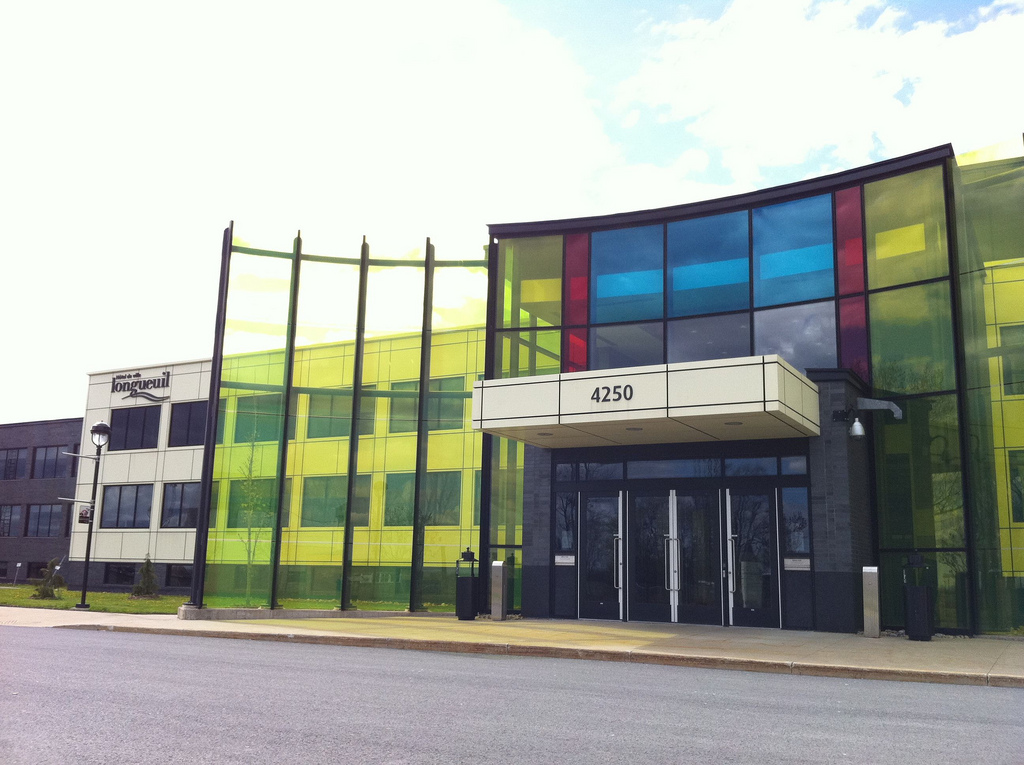
Longueuil City Hall is located in the borough of Saint-Hubert.

The mayor is Catherine Fournier. She is the fifth mayor of Longueuil since the 2002 merger. The previous mayor was Sylvie Parent, who was elected on Nov. 5, 2017. Businessman Jacques Olivier who once served as Minister of Labour served as mayor from 2002 until 2005. The second mayor of Longueuil was Claude Gladu, serving from 2006 to 2009. He also happened to be mayor of the former city of Longueuil from 1994 to 2002. Former member of the House of Commons of Canada, Caroline St-Hilaire was the third mayor from 2009 to 2017.

The city's three boroughs are Le Vieux-Longueuil, Greenfield Park and Saint-Hubert. In total there are 26 city councillors, including one borough president each. Greenfield Park has three councillors and its borough president is Mireille Carrière of Action Longueuil. Saint-Hubert has eight councillors and its borough president is Lorraine Guay-Boivin of Action Longueuil. Le Vieux-Longueuil has fifteen councillors and its borough president is Michel Desjardins of the Parti municipal de Longueuil.

Longueuil's city hall is located in the borough of Saint-Hubert, on the edge of the city.

=== Federal and provincial ===
Longueuil federal election results
Year	Liberal		Conservative		Bloc Québécois		New Democratic		Green	
2025	44%	53,321	16%	18,892	33%	40,254	5%	5,999	0.1%	177
2021	39%	46,741	8%	9,383	39%	46,125	9%	10,694	2%	2,769
2019	36%	45,991	7%	8,768	38%	47,801	9%	11,678	8%	10,388
2015	33%	39,148	9%	11,048	27%	32,714	28%	32,966	3%	3,189
2011	12%	12,877	10%	10,590	29%	31,685	48%	53,186	2%	2,536
2008	21%	22,636	15%	15,519	46%	48,489	15%	15,394	4%	3,856
2006	17%	18,482	19%	20,707	53%	58,833	8%	8,788	4%	791
2004	34%	64,296	6%	10,788	52%	96,449	5%	8,989	3%	5,080

Longueuil provincial election results
Year	CAQ		Liberal		QC solidaire		Parti Québécois	
2018	35%	41,772	20%	23,588	18%	21,171	23%	27,734
2014	23%	27,793	32%	39,762	9%	11,603	33%	41,059

Federally, Longueuil is part of three electoral districts. The riding of Longueuil—Charles-LeMoyne, is represented by Sherry Romanado. The riding of Longueuil-Saint-Hubert is represented by Pierre Nantel. The riding of Montarville, is represented by Michel Picard.

Provincially, Longueuil is represented in four electoral districts. The electoral district of Laporte includes the boroughs of Greenfield Park and Saint-Hubert, and is represented by Nicole Ménard of the Quebec Liberal Party. The electoral district of Marie-Victorin, which includes the western portion of Le Vieux-Longueuil, is represented by Catherine Fournier of the Parti Québécois (PQ). The electoral district of Taillon, which covers the eastern portion of Le Vieux-Longueuil is represented by Marie Malavoy of the PQ. The electoral district of Vachon, which covers the borough of Saint-Hubert, is represented by Martine Ouellet of the PQ.

== Infrastructure ==
=== Commuting patterns ===
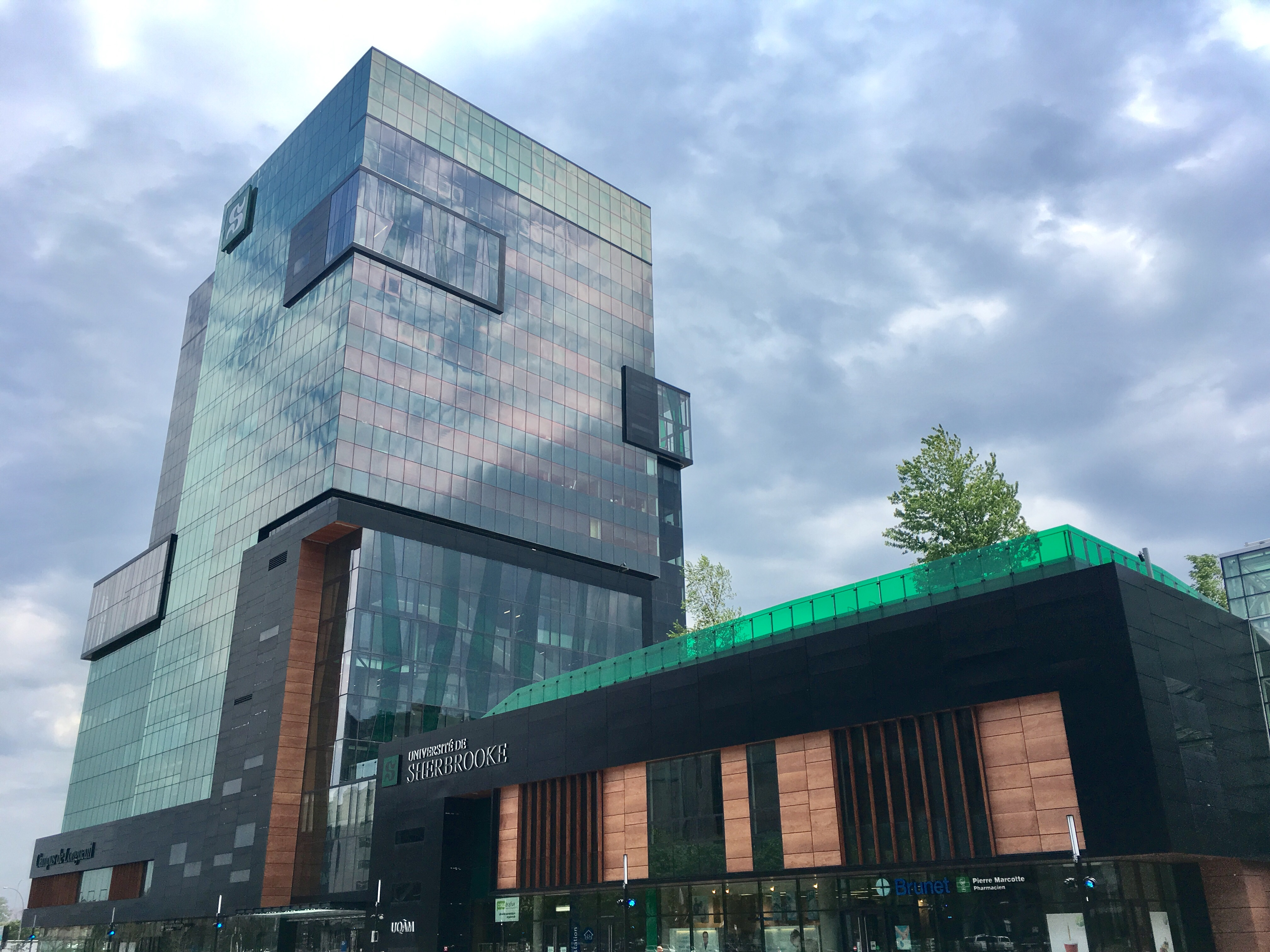
The exterior of the Longueuil–Université-de-Sherbrooke station.

According to the 2006 Census, about 39,485 city residents (17.2% of the total population) commute to work in Montreal on a daily basis, while only 38,090 residents (16.6%) work in the city itself. A further 6,915 residents (3.0%) work in Boucherville every day, 4,775 (2.1%) work in Brossard, 2,795 (1.2%) in Saint-Bruno-de-Montarville, and 1,815 (0.8%) work in Saint-Lambert, the four other constituent cities of the Longueuil agglomeration.

By contrast only 8,845 people commute from Montreal to work in Longueuil every day, while 4,080 people commute from Brossard to work in Longueuil, 2,940 people commute from Boucherville, 2,090 from Sainte-Julie, 1,825 from Saint-Bruno-de-Montarville, 1,815 from Chambly, and 1,810 from Saint-Jean-sur-Richelieu.

=== Roads ===
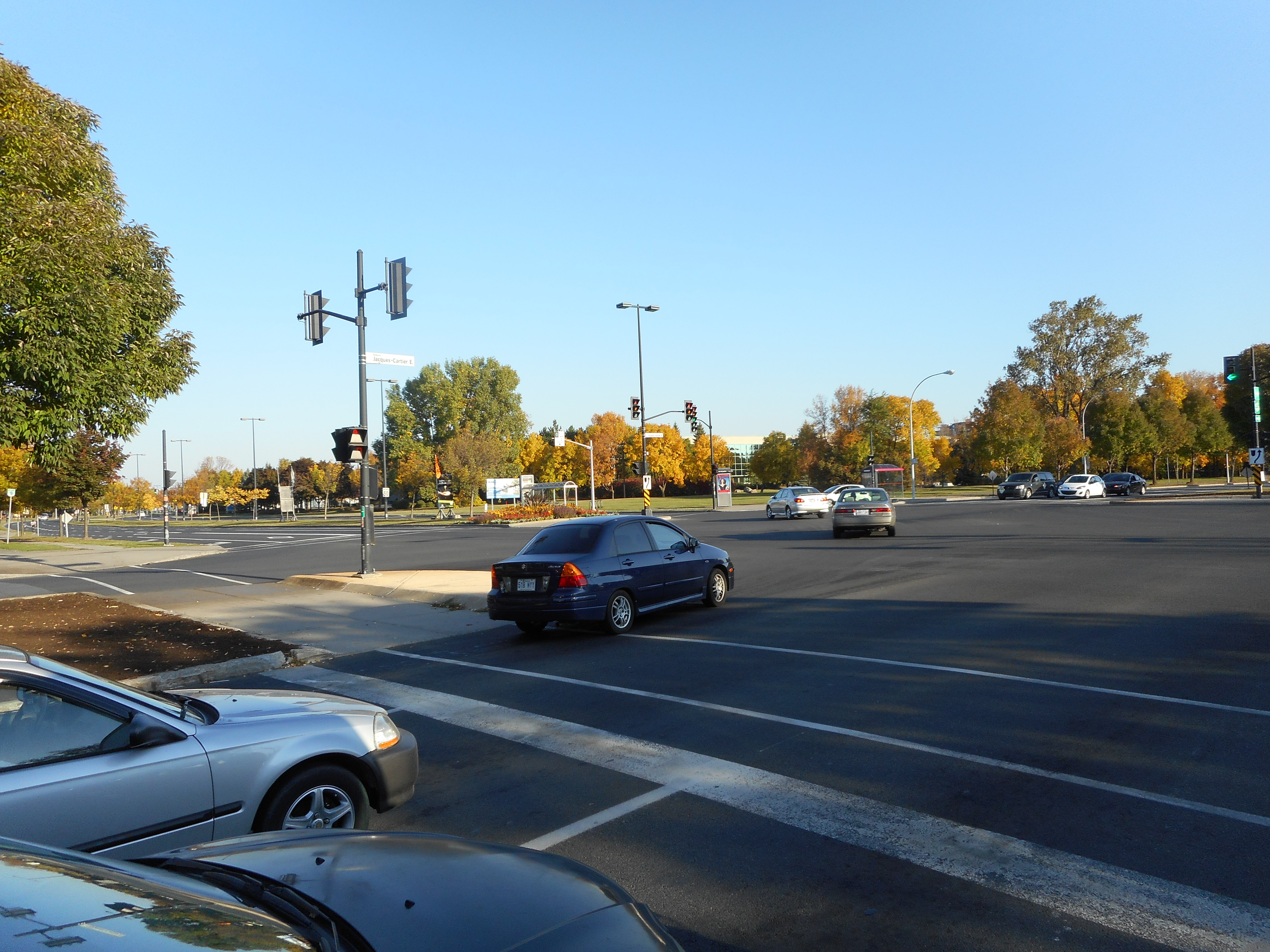
Boulevard Jacques-Cartier Est, at the intersection of boulevard Roland-Therrien

The Saint Lawrence River between the Island of Montreal and the south shore is traversed by only five automobile crossings. Two of these are in Longueuil, the Louis Hippolyte Lafontaine Tunnel (part of Autoroute 25) and the Jacques Cartier Bridge (part of Route 134).

Autoroute 20 is an important highway in Longueuil, bordering the Saint Lawrence River in the Le Vieux-Longueuil borough, where it co-exists with Autoroute René-Lévesque (Route 132), and finally heading eastward toward Boucherville. Autoroute 30 crosses the Saint-Hubert borough in the southern part of the city, between the cities of Brossard and Saint-Bruno-de-Montarville.

Route 116 is another major highway, with its western terminus located in LeMoyne, heading east through the borough of Saint-Hubert toward Saint-Bruno-de-Montarville. Route 112 co-exists with Route 116 from LeMoyne to Cousineau Boulevard in Saint-Hubert, where it heads southeast toward Carignan. Route 134 is a major artery, perhaps better known by its more common names: the Jacques Cartier Bridge on the portion crossing the Saint-Lawrence River, and Taschereau Boulevard which connects the bridge to all three boroughs of Longueuil, and southward toward the city of Brossard.

=== Public transportation ===
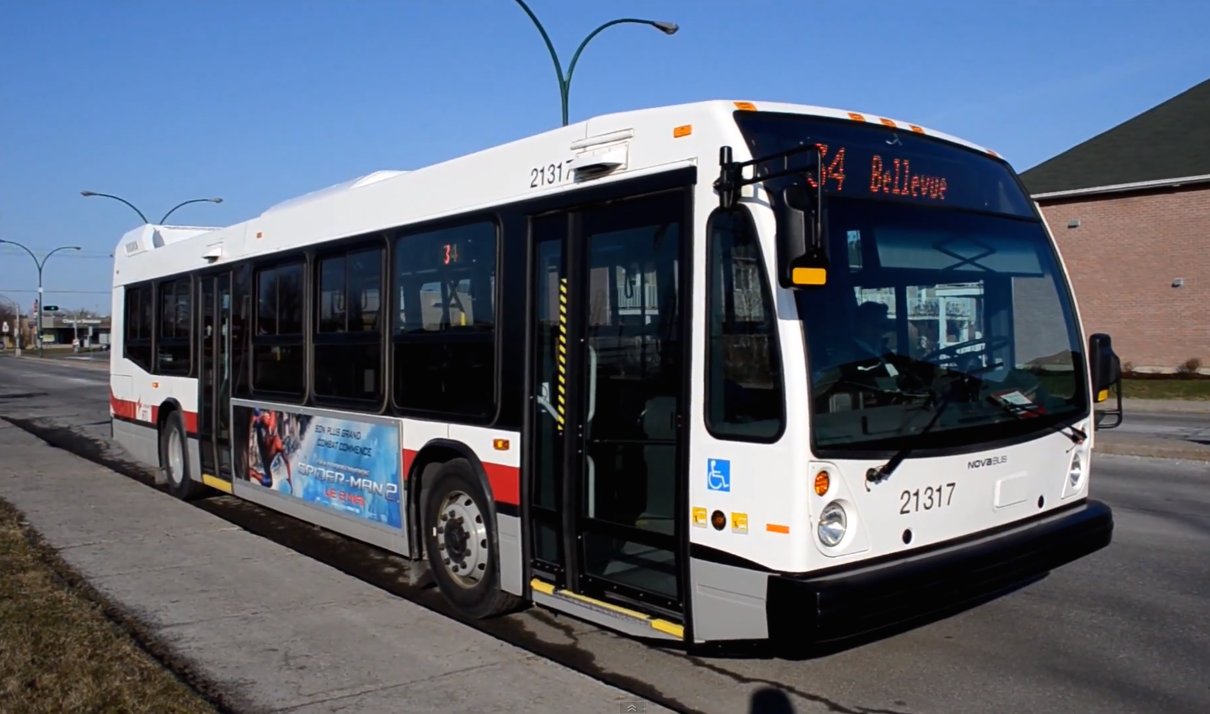
A Réseau de transport de Longueuil bus.

The Réseau de transport de Longueuil (RTL) provides bus service in Longueuil. There are 80 bus routes and 12 shared taxi routes, with a ridership of approximately 18 million passengers in 2022. Ridership prior to the COVID-19 pandemic was approximately 30 million passengers. Almost all bus lines of the RTL terminate at the Longueuil Bus Terminus, or the Panama REM station in nearby Brossard. Prior to the opening of the REM South Shore branch, many buses normally terminating at Panama station crossed the Champlain Bridge during peak hours to arrive at the Terminus Centre-Ville in downtown Montreal (under the 1000 de la Gauchetière office tower, at Bonaventure Metro).

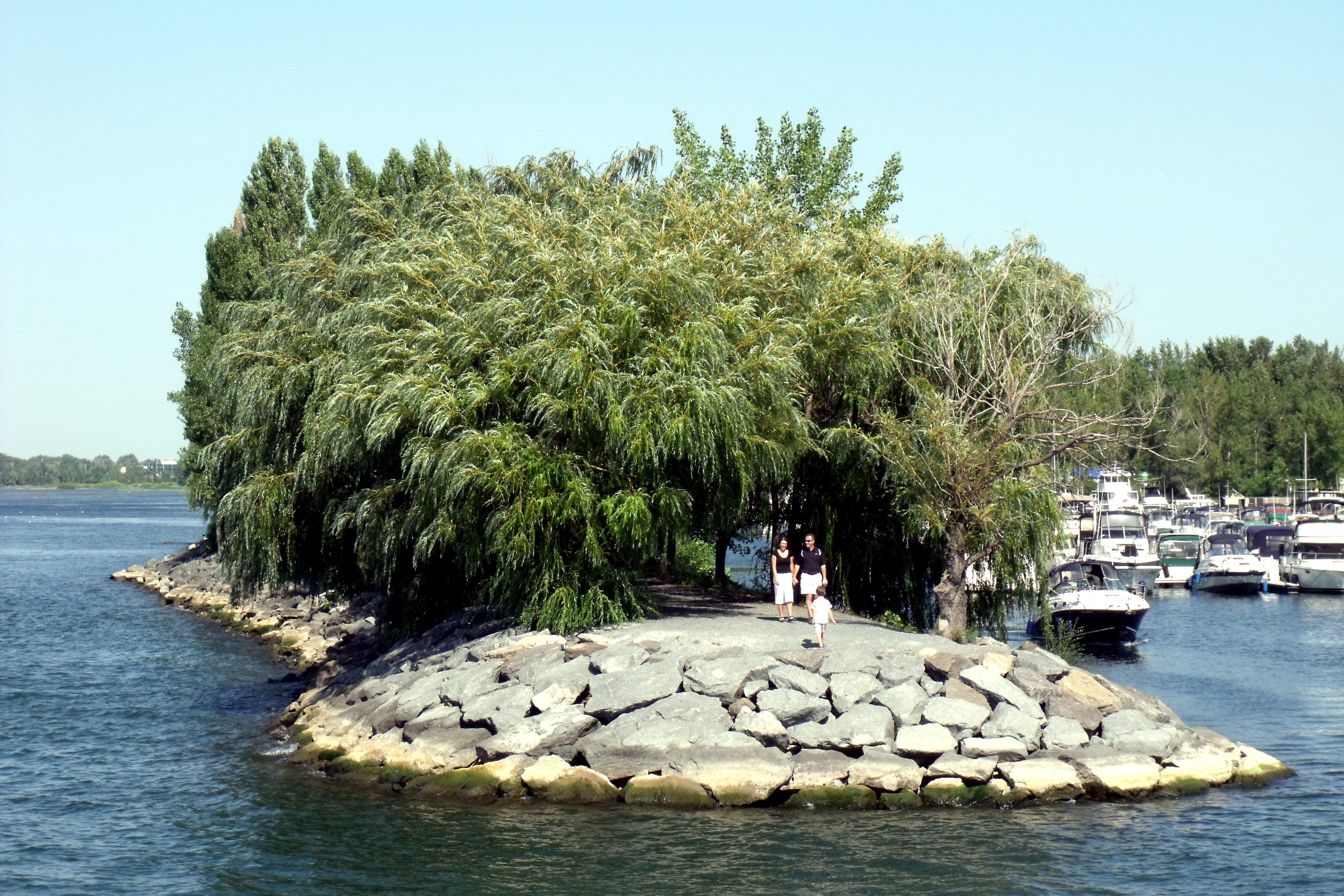
Entrance to Longueuil Marina

The city is also served by the Longueuil–Université-de-Sherbrooke Metro station, adjacent to the Longueuil bus terminus. The station connects to downtown Montreal via the Yellow Line of the Metro. The Réseau de transport métropolitain (RTM) runs the Mont-Saint-Hilaire commuter train line also serves the south shore. The only commuter train station in the city of Longueuil is Longueuil–Saint-Hubert station. Until the mid-1950s, Longueuil was served by interurban streetcars operated by the Montreal and Southern Counties Railway.

Longueuil also has a small national airport, Montreal Metropolitan Airport. It is one of Canada's most important general aviation airports, ranked 12th busiest airport by aircraft movements.

A small marina, the Réal-Bouvier Marina is located on the Saint Lawrence River in the borough of Le Vieux-Longueuil. The Old Port of Montreal–Longueuil Ferry is a seasonal ferry service links the Réal-Bouvier Marina to the Jacques Cartier Pier in the Old Port of Montreal.

=== Hospitals ===
The city is served by two hospitals. The Charles-LeMoyne Hospital is a Université de Sherbrooke affiliated hospital in the borough of Greenfield Park. It is the main hospital for Longueuil, as well as the neighbouring cities of Saint-Lambert and Brossard. The Pierre-Boucher Hospital is a smaller hospital in the borough of Le Vieux-Longueuil which serves Le Vieux-Longueuil, Boucherville, Varennes, Sainte-Julie, Saint-Amable, Verchères, Calixa-Lavallée and Contrecœur.

== Education ==
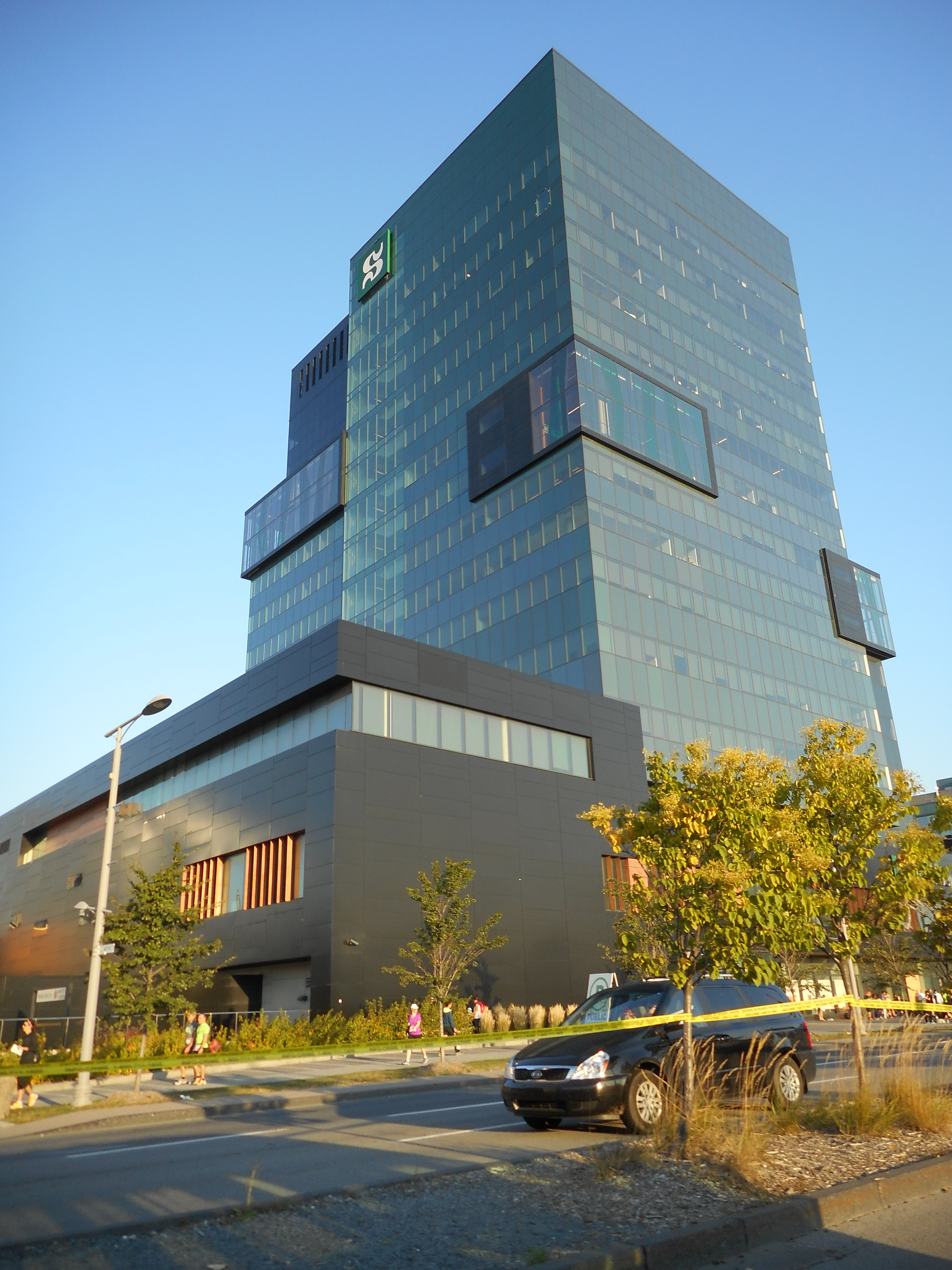
The Longueuil campus of Université de Sherbrooke.

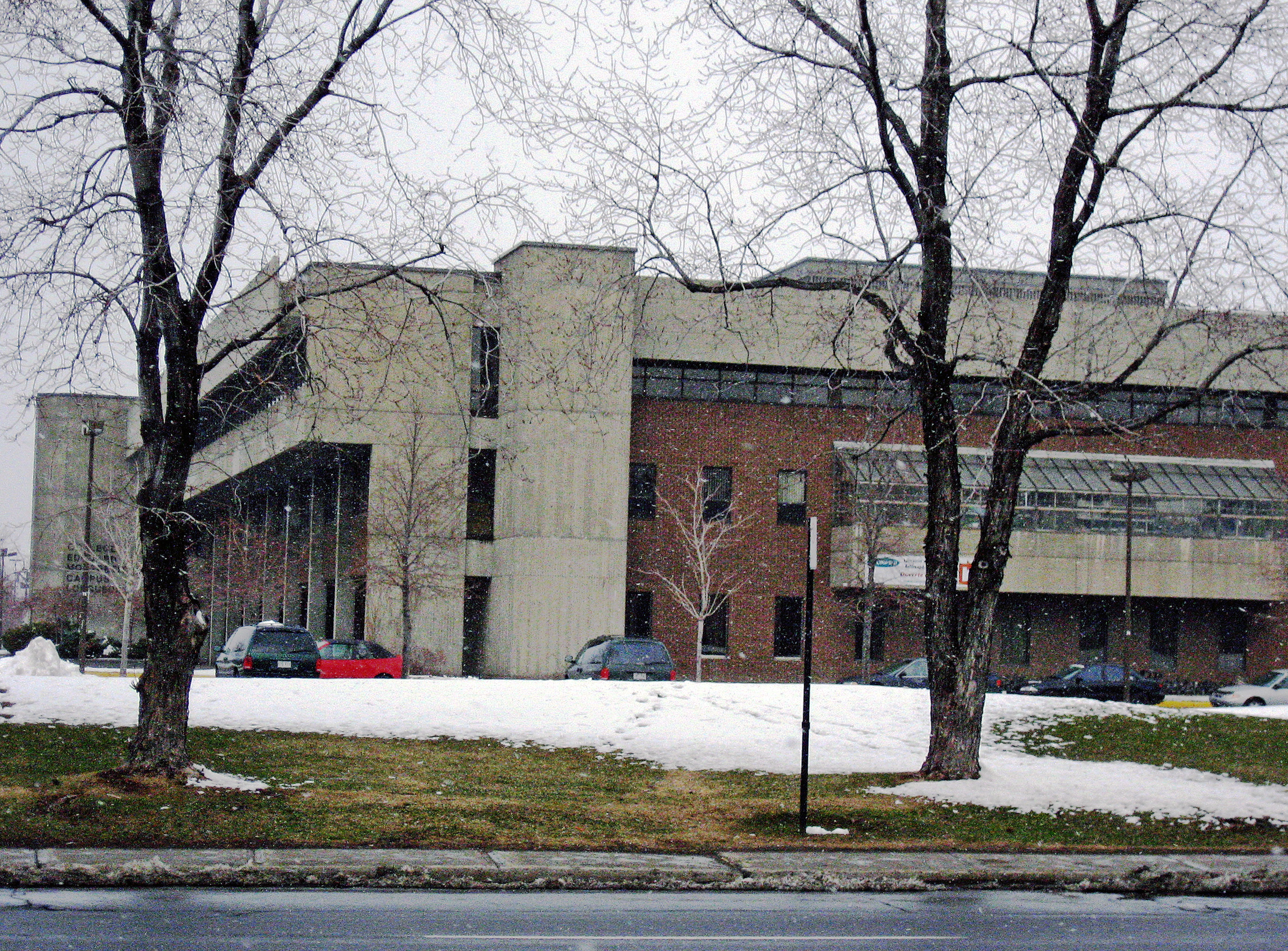
Collège Édouard-Montpetit, the only French CEGEP in Longueuil

The city of Longueuil is served by several educational institutions. Both the Université de Sherbrooke and Université de Montréal maintain campuses in the Borough of Le Vieux-Longueuil.

There is one CEGEP in Longueuil, Collège Édouard-Montpetit, located in Le Vieux-Longueuil. Collège Édouard-Montpetit has an aerotechnic school, École nationale d'aérotechnique located at a separate campus in the borough of Saint-Hubert near Saint-Hubert Airport.

There are two technical and professional colleges, both located in Le Vieux-Longueuil: these are the Pierre-Dupuy Professional Formation Centre and Collège Info-Technique.

=== Primary and secondary schools ===
Public anglophone schools are operated by the Riverside School Board. There are three secondary schools in Longueuil operated by the Riverside School Board: Centennial Regional High School in Greenfield Park, Heritage Regional High School in Saint-Hubert, and Saint-Lambert International High School in Saint-Lambert.

Public francophone schools are operated by the Commission scolaire Marie-Victorin. There are seven secondary schools in Longueuil operated by that district. École secondaire Internationale St-Edmond and École secondaire Participative l'Agora are in Greenfield Park. École secondaire André-Laurendeau and École secondaire Mgr-A.M.-Parent are in Saint-Hubert. École secondaire Gérard-Filion, École secondaire Jacques-Rousseau and École secondaire St-Jean-Baptiste are in Le Vieux-Longueuil.

Prior to 1998 the South Shore Protestant Regional School Board served the municipality.

There are also three private francophone secondary schools, all of which are in Le Vieux-Longueuil. They are Collège Charles-Lemoyne, Collège Français and Collège Notre-Dame-de-Lourdes.

== Media ==
Longueuil and the other cities in the agglomeration are served by two free weekly French-language newspapers. Le Courrier du Sud is the oldest, and contains inserts tailored to specific boroughs ("Le Journal de Saint-Hubert" for Saint-Hubert and "Le Magazine" for Greenfield Park, LeMoyne and the city of Saint-Lambert). Rive-Sud Express is a newer weekly, published by Transcontinental Media. Both "Le Courrier du Sud" and "Rive-Sud Express" are both home delivered as well as available in newspaper boxes. Point Sud is an independent monthly newspaper, also free of charge, that is carried on newspaper stands.

Longueuil is also served by the CHAA-FM 103.3 radio station. Another radio station, CHMP-FM 98.5 is officially licensed to Longueuil, despite both the studio and transmitter being located in Montreal. Residents of Longueuil and adjacent communities are also served by a local cable television station, Télé Rive-Sud (TVRS), which is owned by Quebecor Media and is an affiliate of Canal Vox. It is available to Videotron cable subscribers only.

== Twin towns – sister cities ==
Longueuil is twinned with:

- Lafayette, Louisiana, United States
- Whitby, Ontario, Canada

== Notable people ==
- Micheline Beauchemin (1929 – 2009), textile artist and weaver
- Maxime Comtois, ice hockey player
- Elizabeth Hosking, Olympic snowboarder
- Jon Lajoie, comedian
- Anthony Mantha, ice hockey player for the Pittsburgh Penguins
- Émilien Néron, actor
- Lysianne Proulx, soccer player
- Judith Sainte-Marie, painter
- Nathan Saliba, soccer player
- Abraham Toro, Major League Baseball infielder for the Boston Red Sox
- Zviane, graphic novelist
- Fredz, musician

== See also ==
- Baron de Longueuil
- List of cities in Quebec
