= Hôpital Pierre Boucher =

Hospital in Longueuil, Quebec, Canada

Hôpital Pierre-Boucher Pierre Boucher Hospital
- CSSS Pierre-Boucher
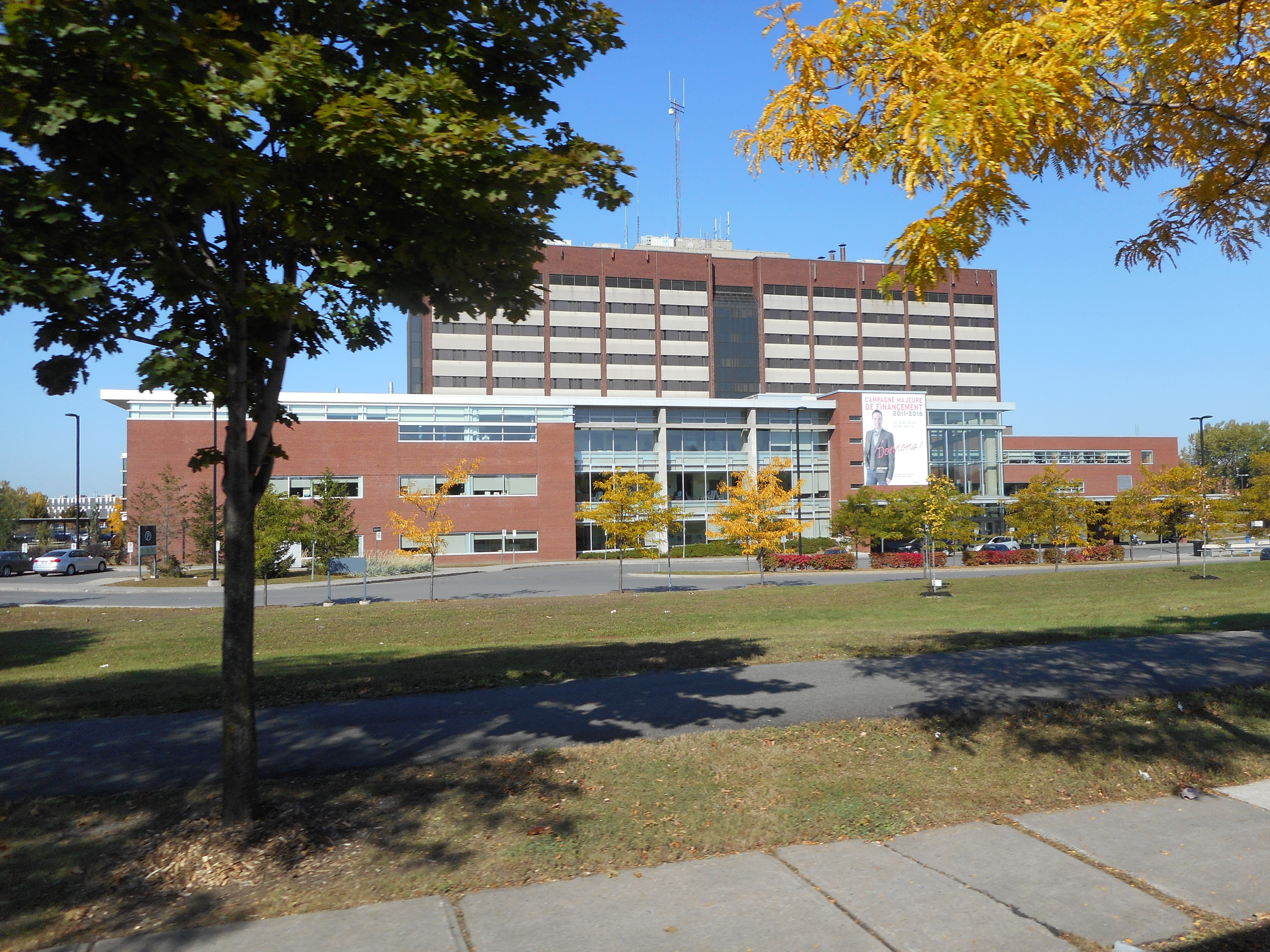

- Location in Greater Montreal

Geography
- Location: 1333 Jacques-Cartier East, Longueuil, Quebec, Canada
- Coordinates: 45.5382°N 73.4584°W

Organization
- Care system: RAMQ (Quebec medicare)
- Type: Acute care

Services
- Emergency department: Level I trauma centre
- Beds: 329

History
- Founded: 1982

Links
- Website: Official website
- Lists: Hospitals in Canada

Pierre Boucher Hospital (French: Hôpital Pierre-Boucher, pronounced [opital pjɛʁ buʃe]) is a Canadian hospital located on Jacques Cartier Boulevard in Longueuil, Quebec. Inaugurated in 1982, the hospital is the regional health centre for 245,000 people located in the borough of Le Vieux-Longueuil, as well as the cities and towns of Boucherville, Varennes, Verchères, Sainte-Julie, Saint-Amable, Calixa-Lavallée and Contrecœur.

The hospital provides general, specialized and ultraspecialized health care, and is also the location of 3,400 births per year. The hospital is home to 329 beds, and its emergency department is overcrowded at 55,000 visits per year. In 2003, the Government of Quebec invested $60 million into the hospital, which was expanded and renovated. The hospital also transfers patients to the nearby, larger, Hôpital Charles-LeMoyne.
