= Fort Longueuil =

Coordinates: 45°32′26″N 73°30′30″W

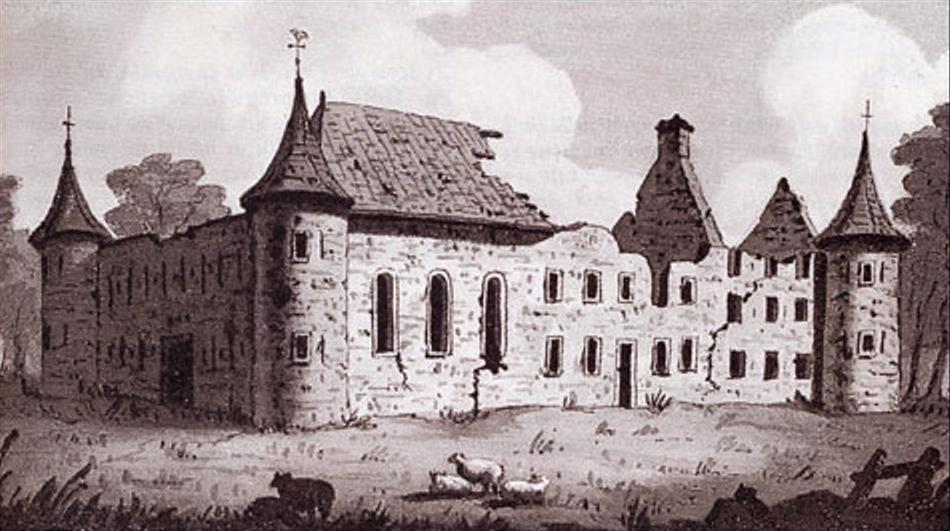
The ruins of Fort Longueuil in 1825.

Fort Longueuil was a stone fort that stood in Longueuil, in Quebec, Canada from 1690 to 1810.

Fort Longueuil was recognized as a National Historic Site of Canada on May 25, 1923. The historic site includes the archaeological site of the fort, which was demolished in 1810. The site extends beneath the present-day Saint-Antoine-de-Padoue Cathedral. It is one of the only buildings in Canada that could ever be considered a castle (fortified residence for a noble), and out of those buildings it most resembles the castles of Europe. This makes it unique in the country.

== History ==
The territory of New France was divided into seigneuries in order to ensure the colony's defence. Of these seigneuries, Charles Le Moyne was granted the Seigneury of Longueuil. His son, Charles Le Moyne de Longueuil, built a fort with four towers between 1685 and 1690 as his fortified residence. The fort was built entirely in stone masonry, and included a guard house, a chapel and corps de logis.

Louis de Buade de Frontenac and Jean Bochart de Champigny then asked King Louis XIV to erect the seigneury of Longueuil as a barony, which he did in 1700, establishing the Barony of Longueuil. Charles Le Moyne de Longueuil was the only Canadian-born person to be raised to the rank of Baron by a French King.

Fort Longueuil was believed to be occupied by American troops during the American Revolutionary War. It was subsequently occupied by the British. It was demolished in 1810 because of its poor condition.

== Location ==
The fort was located in the Old Longueuil neighbourhood. It was partly situated on the site of the Co-Cathedral of Saint-Antoine-de-Padoue, Saint-Charles Street, Chambly Road, the site of a Laurentian Bank branch and a restaurant. Parts of the fort are visible in the Royal Bank of Canada branch through a special made hole in the floor.

== Description ==
It measured 68 meters long by 46 meters wide. The interior of the fort included:

- a house 72 X 24 feet
- a chapel of 45 X 22 feet
- a guard house of 25 X 25 feet
- a barn of 70 X 30 feet
- a barn to house 12 horses
- stables to house 40 cattle
- a barn 30 feet squared and other necessary farm buildings
