= Judith Sainte-Marie =

Canadian painter (1886-1970)

- Born: 1886; Longueuil, Quebec, Canada
- Died: 1970 (aged 83–84); Longueuil, Quebec, Canada
- Known for: Painter

Judith Sainte-Marie (1886–1970) was a Canadian painter.

== Collections ==
- Pierre-Zotique Sainte-Marie, father of the artist, 1912, Musée national des beaux-arts du Québec
