= New Life Church (Canada) =

Coordinates: 45°32′52″N 73°29′55″W

Église Nouvelle Vie
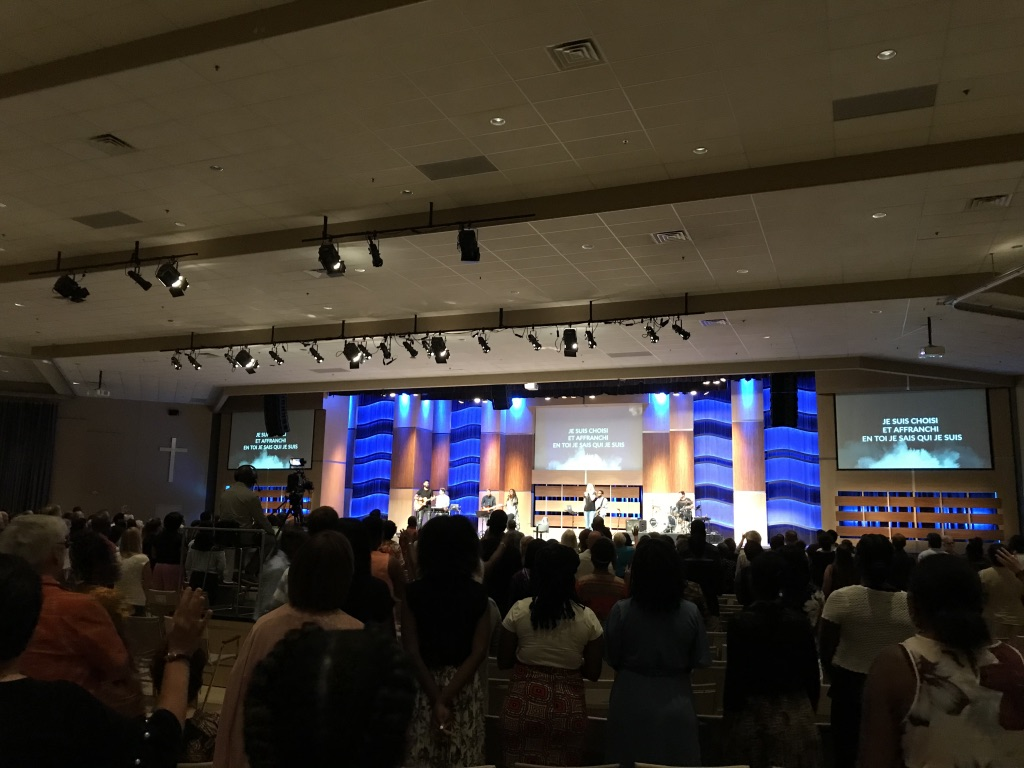
- Église Nouvelle Vie Longueuil
- Église Nouvelle Vie
- Location: Longueuil
- Country: Canada
- Denomination: Pentecostal
- Website: nouvellevie.com

History
- Founded: 1993
- Founder: Claude Houde

Specifications
- Capacity: 2,400

New Life church (French: Église Nouvelle vie) is an Evangelical Pentecostal multi-site megachurch based in Longueuil, Quebec, Canada, affiliated with the Christian Association for the Francophonie. Its senior pastor is Claude Houde.

== History ==
The church was founded in 1993 in Longueuil, Quebec, starting with 50 members and pastored by Claude Houde. In 1998, following a massive ice storm causing severe cold and power cuts for more than a month, the church housed 500 homeless people for three weeks. It is recognized by the mayor as a public utility. In 2001, it inaugurated its current building including a 2,400-seat auditorium, the largest in Canada's Francophonie. In 2003, the church left the Pentecostal Assemblies of Canada. In 2005, it founded the Institute of Theology for the Francophonie, near the premises of Nouvelle vie. In 2006, the church began to draw over 3,000 people per week. In 2007, the church founded the Association chrétienne pour la Francophonie (Christian Association for the Francophonie), a network of Pentecostal churches, member of World Assemblies of God Fellowship. In 2010, Impact, a music group, was formed in the youth department of the church. The group has performed various tours in Europe. In 2011, Nouvelle Vie had 4,000 members. In 2024, it had opened 8 campuses in different cities.

== New Life Action ==
The church founded Action Nouvelle Vie in 1993, a humanitarian organization who offers a food bank, a thrift store and assistance programs for pregnant women. The organization has its own board of directors and is therefore an independent body of the church. In 2015, it founded 2159, a youth center that aims to develop autonomy and prevent homelessness and delinquency.

== Nueva vida ==
New Life Church also offers a weekly worship service in Spanish (Nueva Vida).

== See also ==
- List of the largest evangelical churches
- List of the largest evangelical church auditoriums

== Bibliography ==
- Sébastien Fath, Dieu XXL, la révolution des mégachurches, Éditions Autrement, France, 2008, p. 110, 132, 141–143, 171
- Philippe Le Page, Megachurch pentecôtiste en contexte québécois : la religion vécue à l'Église Nouvelle Vie de Longueuil, Master's thesis in religious studies, UQAM, 31, Canada, 2015
