= Le Vieux-Longueuil =

- Borough of Longueuil
- L'arrondissement du Vieux-Longueuil
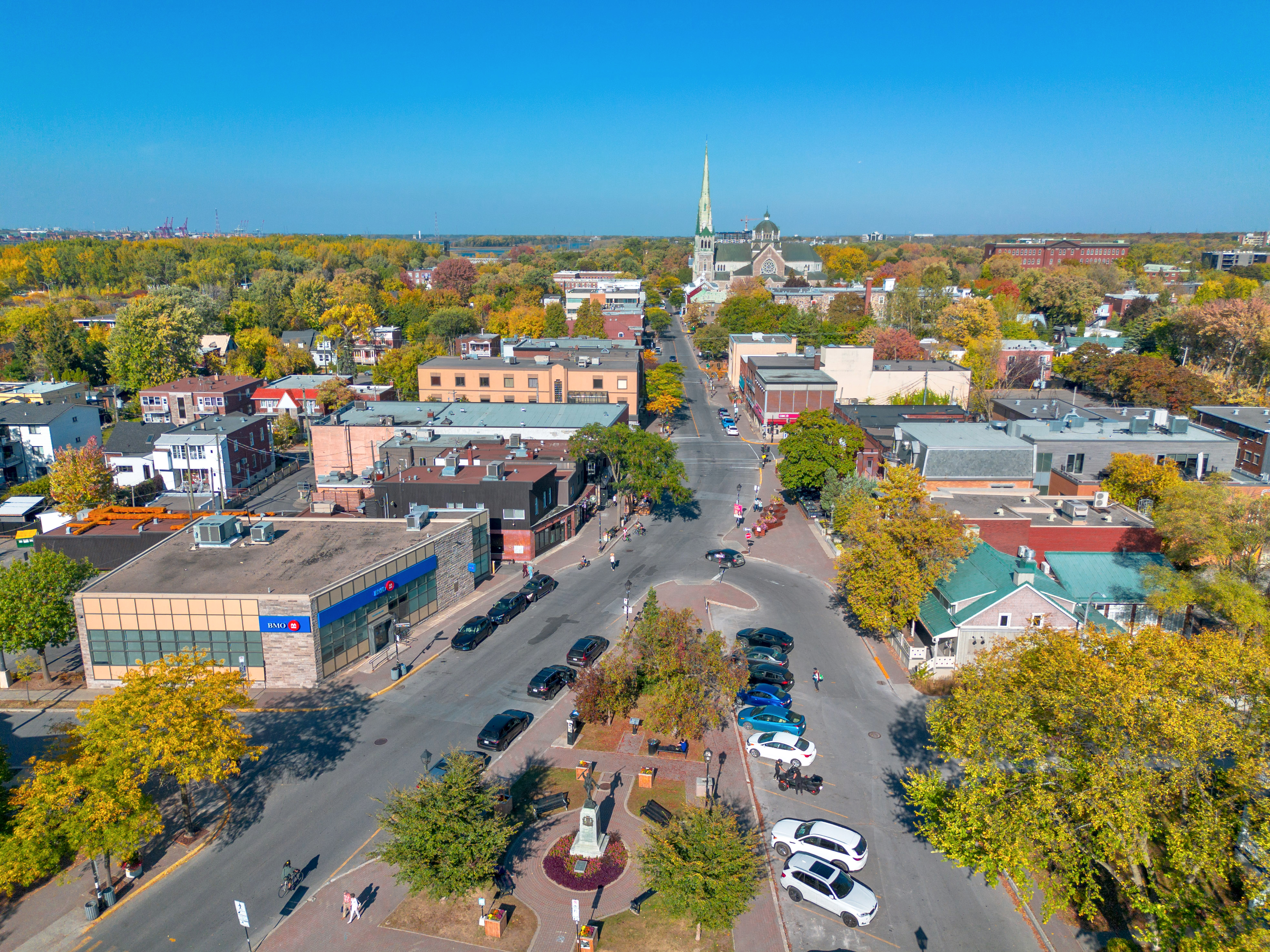
- Le Vieux-Longueuil in 2025

- Flag

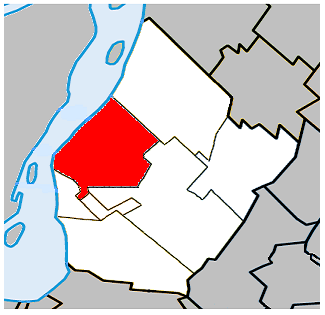
- Location within Urban Agglomeration of Longueuil.

- Location in southern Quebec.
- Coordinates: 45°32′N 73°31′W
- Country: Canada
- Province: Quebec
- City: Longueuil
- Created: January 1, 2002
- Modified: January 1, 2006
- Electoral Districts Federal: Saint-Lambert; Longueuil—Pierre-Boucher
- Provincial: Marie-Victorin; Taillon; Laporte

Government
  - Type: Borough
  - Federal MP(s): Sadia Groguhé (NDP); Pierre Nantel (NDP)
  - Quebec MNA(s): Bernard Drainville (PQ); Marie Malavoy (PQ)

Area
  - Total: 44.84 km^{2} (17.31 sq mi)

Population (2006)
  - Total: 135,218
  - Density: 3,018.6/km^{2} (7,818/sq mi)
  - Change (2001-06): ▲1.7%
  - Dwellings: 64,119
- Time zone: UTC−05:00 (EST)
  - Summer (DST): UTC−04:00 (EDT)
- Area code: 450
- Access Routes A-20 A-25: R-112; R-116; R-132; R-134
- Website: Webpage

Le Vieux-Longueuil (French pronunciation: [lə vjø lɔ̃ɡœj], lit. 'The Old Longueuil') is a borough in the city of Longueuil.

From 2002 to 2005, Le Vieux-Longueuil borough stood for what used to be the city of Longueuil from 1969 to 2001. The former city of Longueuil was composed of 3 municipalities merged in the 1960s: Ville Jacques-Cartier, Montréal-Sud and Longueuil.

Since 2006, Le Vieux-Longueuil borough stands for the combination of the former city of Longueuil (1969-2001) and LeMoyne. LeMoyne joined Le Vieux-Longueuil borough when Saint-Lambert left the city of Longueuil.

Le Vieux-Longueuil borough has 9 municipal districts. One of the districts contains LeMoyne and a portion of the former city of Longueuil. The other 8 districts are all located in the former city of Longueuil.

== Demographics ==
Historical population
Year	Pop.	±%
1991	129,808	—
1996	127,977	−1.4%
2001	128,016	+0.0%
2006	130,069	+1.6%

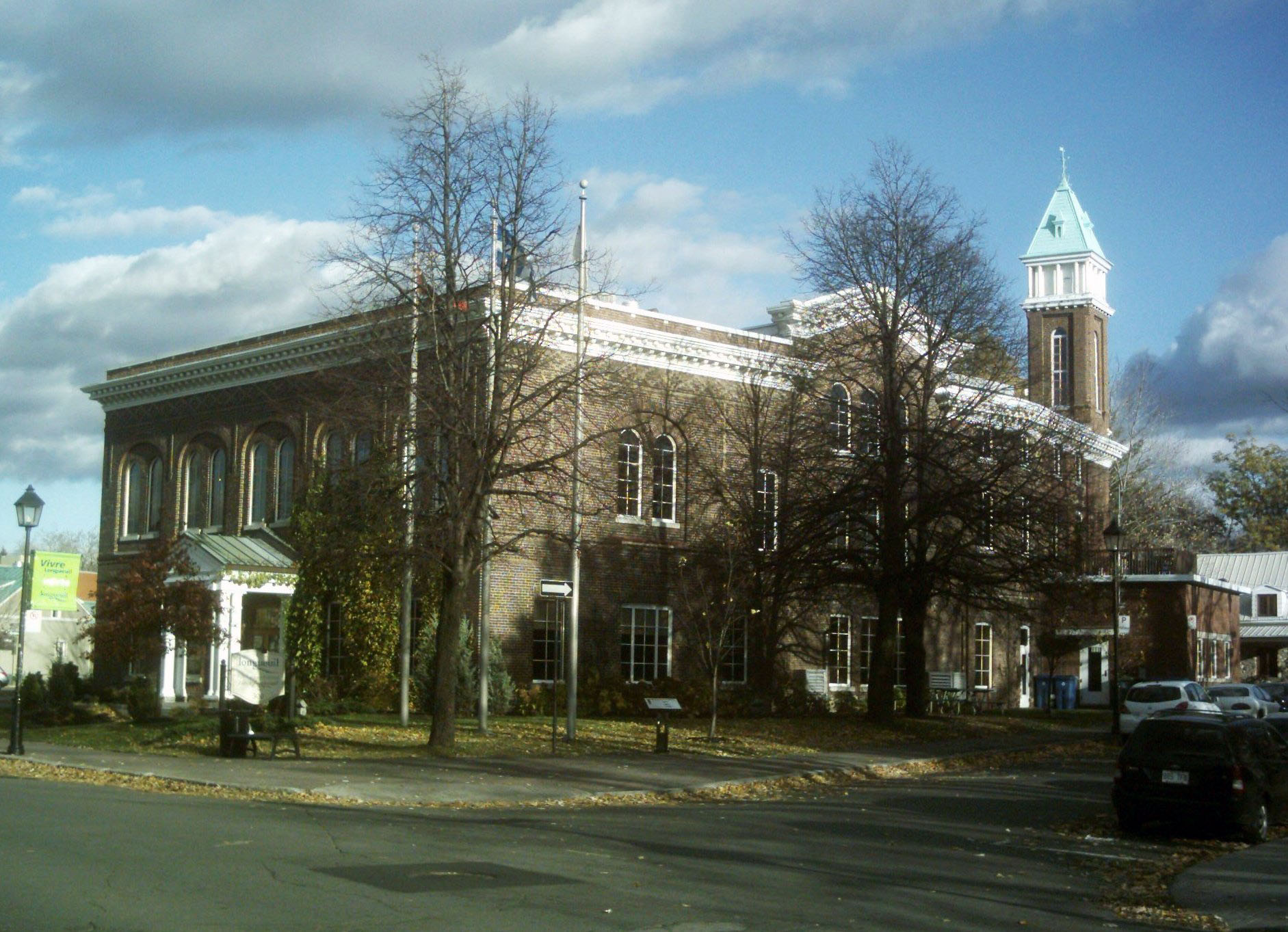
City hall of the former city of Longueuil. Now serving as the borough hall of Le Vieux-Longueuil.

Mother tongue language (2006)
Language	Population	Percentage (%)
French only	112,470	84.2%
English only	3,885	2.9%
Both English and French	915	0.7%
Other languages	16,250	12.2%

Note: Includes combined results of the former cities of Longueuil and Lemoyne.

== Education ==
=== Primary ===
- Ecole Primaire Adrien-Gamache
- Ecole Primaire Armand-Racicot
- Ecole Primaire Bel-Essor
- Ecole Primaire Bourgeoys-Champagnat
- Ecole Primaire Carillon
- Ecole Primaire Christ-Roi
- Ecole Primaire de Normandie
- Ecole Primaire du Curé-Lequin
- Ecole Primaire du Tournesol
- Ecole Primaire Félix-Leclerc
- Ecole Primaire Gentilly
- Ecole Primaire Gentilly (Boisé des Lutins)
- Ecole Primaire George-Étienne-Cartier
- Ecole Primaire Hubert-Perron
- Ecole Primaire Jacques-Ouellette
- Ecole Primaire Jean-De Lalande
- Ecole Primaire Joseph-de Sérigny
- Ecole Primaire Lajeunesse *
- Ecole Primaire le Déclic
- Ecole Primaire les Petits-Castors
- Ecole Primaire Lionel-Groulx
- Ecole Primaire Marie-Victorin (Longueuil) Pavillon le Jardin
- Ecole Primaire Marie-Victorin (Longueuil) Pavillon l'Herbier
- Ecole Primaire Paul-De Maricourt
- Ecole Primaire Pierre-D'Iberville
- Ecole Primaire Plein-Soleil
- Ecole Primaire Sainte-Claire
- Ecole Primaire Saint-Jude
- Ecole Primaire Saint-Romain
- Ecole Primaire Samuel-de Champlain (Longueuil)
- St. Mary's Elementary

=== Secondary ===
- Collège Charles-Lemoyne (Longueuil Campus)
- Collège Français
- Collège Notre-Dame-de-Lourdes
- École Secondaire Gérard-Filion
  - École Secondaire Gérard-Filion (Pavillon Bois-Joly)
  - École Secondaire Gérard-Filion Le BAC (secondaire spécial)
- École Secondaire Hélène-De Champlain (Longueuil)
- École Secondaire Jacques-Ouellette
- École Secondaire Jacques-Rousseau
- École Secondaire Notre-Dame
- École Secondaire Saint-Jean-Baptiste

=== Adult Education ===
- Centre d'apprentissage personnalisé le Cap
- CEA LeMoyne-D'Iberville

=== Higher Education ===
- Université de Sherbrooke (Longueuil Campus)
- Collège Édouard-Montpetit CEGEP
- Centre de formation professionnelle Gérard-Filion
- Centre de formation professionnelle Jacques-Rousseau
- Centre de formation professionnelle Pierre-Dupuy
- The primary school Lajeunesse is located in LeMoyne. All other educational institutions listed above are in the former city of Longueuil.

== See also ==
- Municipal reorganization in Quebec
- Old Longueuil
