= Collège Notre-Dame-de-Lourdes =

School in Longueuil, Quebec, Canada

Coordinates: 45°30′56″N 73°30′45″W

- Longueuil, Quebec; Canada

Information
- Website: www.ndl.qc.ca

The Notre-Dame-de-Lourdes College is a high school level education facility located in Longueuil, Quebec, Canada. It is a school which is part of the International Baccalaureate. The students attending the college normally refer to it as NDL, Collège Notre-Dame-de-Lourdes being a long name.
