= Le Moyne, Quebec =

- Neighbourhood
- Houses on Saint-Georges Street
- Motto(s): "Droit et Loyal" (French) "Right and Loyal"
- Location of Le Moyne in Greater Montreal
- Coordinates: 45.501889°N 73.490611°W
- Country: Canada
- Province: Quebec
- City: Longueuil
- Borough: Le Vieux-Longueuil
- Established: 1949
- Merger with Longueuil: January 1, 2002

Government
  - Le Moyne-Jacques-Cartier City Councillor: Colette Éthier (AL)

Area
  - Land: 1.00 km^{2} (0.39 sq mi)

Population (2011)
  - Total: 4,813
  - Density: 4,813/km^{2} (12,470/sq mi)
  - Change *: ▼7.0%
  - Dwellings: 2,815
- Time zone: UTC-5 (EST)
  - Summer (DST): UTC-4 (EDT)
- Area code: 450
- Access Routes: R-112; R-116; R-134

Le Moyne (French pronunciation: [lə mwan]; also known as Ville Le Moyne, formerly known as LeMoyne) is a neighbourhood in Longueuil, Quebec, part of the borough of Le Vieux-Longueuil, and a former city. Le Moyne makes up 2% of the total area of Le Vieux-Longueuil and is the only neighbourhood of the borough that was not part of the pre-2002 city of Longueuil. Residents of Le Moyne are called Le Moynois.

The municipal electoral district of Le Moyne-Jacques-Cartier corresponds to the territory of Le Moyne, along with a portion from the former city of Longueuil.

== History ==
According to local historian Michel Pratt, the name "Le Moyne" was chosen by Redmond Roche of the Union Nationale, in honour to Charles Le Moyne.

The town hall of Le Moyne was originally on Saint-Louis Street near Laurier Street. In 1967, the town hall was moved to 2205 Saint-Georges Street where it remained until the merger of Le Moyne with Longueuil in 2002. It is now a fire station for the city of Longueuil.

The last of motto of Le Moyne, before its annexation into Longueuil, was Droit et Loyal (English translation: Right and Loyal)

On January 1, 2002, Le Moyne ceased to exist as a municipality and was amalgamated into the city of Longueuil to become part of the Saint-Lambert/Le Moyne borough. However, on June 20, 2004 Saint-Lambert voted to demerge from Longueuil and on January 1, 2006 regained its status of city, while Le Moyne opted to stay in Longueuil.

After the demergers, Le Moyne joined Le Vieux-Longueuil borough following the results of a 2005 referendum in which the residents of Le Moyne were given the choice to pick a new borough between Le Vieux-Longueuil, Saint-Hubert and Greenfield Park.

== Demographics ==
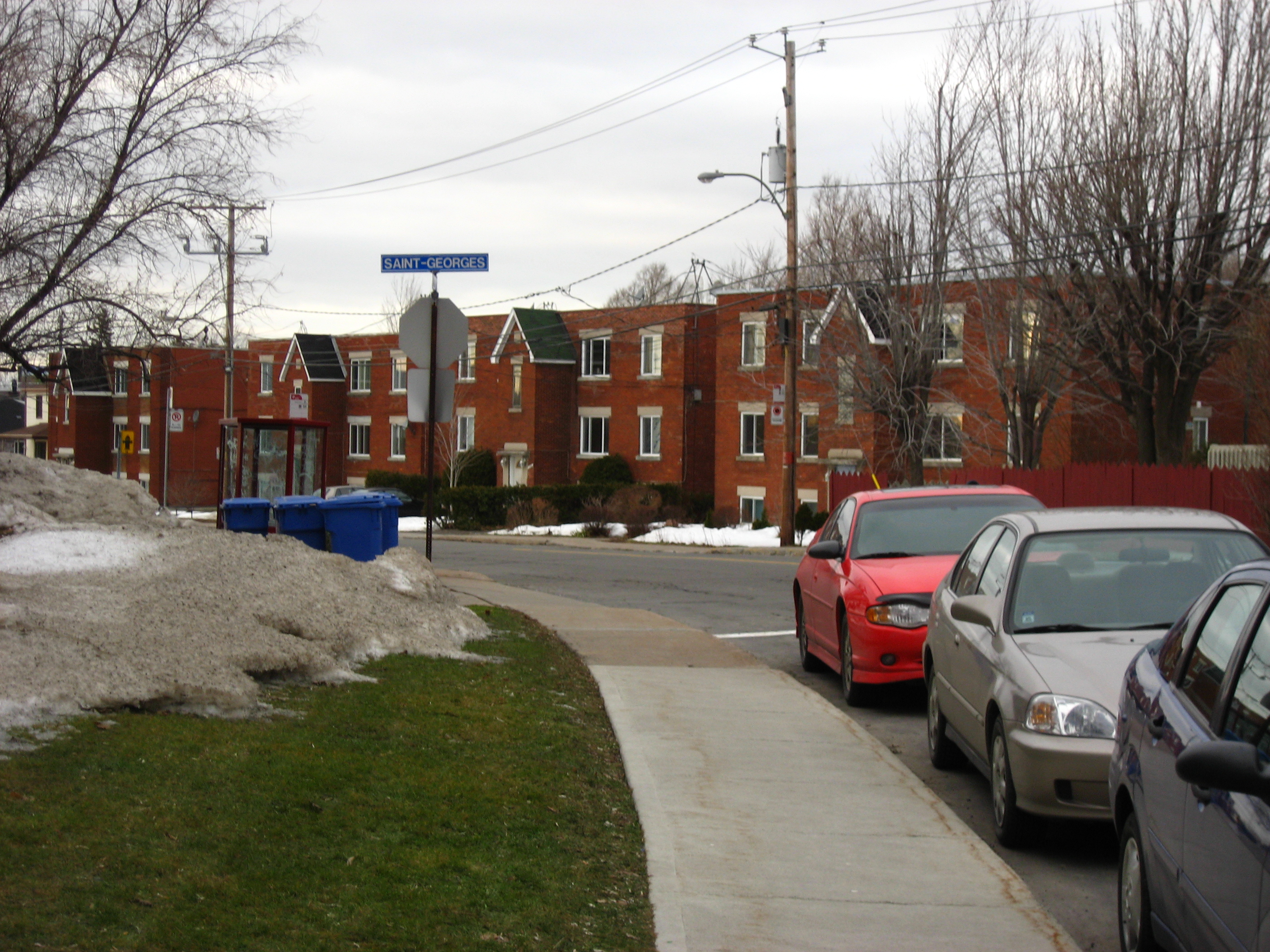
Apartments on Tiffin Road.

Historical populations
Year	Pop.	±%
1951	4,078	—
1961	8,057	+97.6%
1971	8,184	+1.6%
1981	6,137	−25.0%
1991	5,412	−11.8%
1996	5,052	−6.7%
2001	4,855	−3.9%
2006	5,149	+6.1%
2011	4,813	−6.5%

Mother tongue language (2006)
Language	Population	Percentage (%)
French	4,185	81.6%
English	440	8.6%
Both English and French	30	0.6%
Other languages	475	9.3%

== Mayors ==
Former Mayors of Le Moyne
Mayor	Term Began	Term Ended
Henri Sicotte	1949	1952
Albert Bélanger	1952	1954
Jean Baribeau	1954	1967
André Charpentier	1967	1977
Michel Sicotte	1977	1981
Louise Gravel	1981	1993
Guy Talbot	1993	2001
Part of Longueuil	2002	present

== Saint-Maxime and Saint-Josaphat ==
Le Moyne is divided into two sections separated by Route 112. They are Saint-Maxime and Saint-Josaphat, the two Catholic parishes that are the ancestors of Le Moyne.

Route 112 is called Saint-Louis Street in Saint-Maxime. Saint-Maxime has the shape of rectangle and is located from Saint-Louis Street to the limits of Greenfield Park. Saint-Maxime Church, built in 1918, is on Charron Street.

In Saint-Josaphat, Route 112 is called Sir Wilfrid-Laurier Boulevard. Saint-Josaphat has the shape somewhat of a boomerang or a hockey stick, and is located from Sir Wilfrid Laurier Boulevard to the limits of the former city of Longueuil. Saint-Josaphat Church is located on De L'Église Street.

== Notable people ==
- Maxime Talbot, former NHL player

== See also ==
- Boroughs of Longueuil
- List of former cities in Quebec
- List of mayors of Longueuil
- Longueuil City Council
- Longueuil
- Municipal reorganization in Quebec
- Urban Agglomeration of Longueuil
- Le Vieux-Longueuil
