= Montréal-Sud =

Suburb of Montreal, Quebec, Canada

Coordinates: 45°31′31″N 73°30′54″W

Montréal-Sud (French for 'Montreal South'; pronounced [mɔ̃ʁeal syd]) was a suburb of Montreal located on the south shore of the St. Lawrence River founded in 1906. Montreal-South was created from land of the Saint-Antoine-de-Longueuil parish. Originally a village in its first five years, Montreal-South gained the status of city in 1911.

Rue Sainte-Hélène in the former city

Early in its existence, its population was split between French-speaking Roman Catholics and English-speaking Protestants. This changed by the middle of the century, as the Francophones became the overwhelming majority.

The approximate territorial limits of the city were La Fayette Boulevard in the west, Bertrand Street in the south, Joliette Street in the east and St. Lawrence River in the north. Like neighbouring Longueuil, Montreal-South was an enclave of the much larger Ville Jacques-Cartier.

During a two-day referendum held on August 13 and August 14, 1960, Montreal-South residents decided with a 114 majority out of 800 eligible voters to merge with the city of Longueuil This would make Longueuil the second largest municipality in the south shore after Ville Jacques-Cartier, with a population of 25,000. The annexation project was supported by the existing city of Longueuil and forwarded to the provincial government in September 1960 for cabinet approval. On January 28, 1961, Montreal-South officially merged with Longueuil, keeping the latter's name.

== Aftermath ==
After Montreal-South was dissolved, its former territory underwent a major urban development that began in the 1960s and continues to this day.

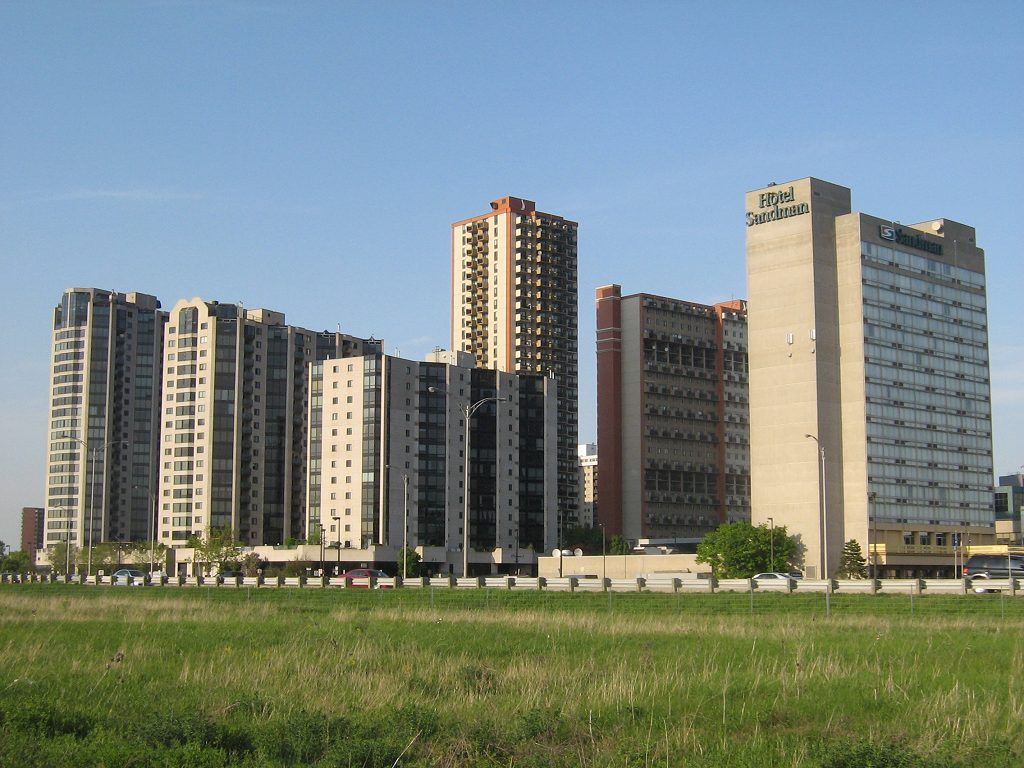
Place Charles-Le Moyne skyline

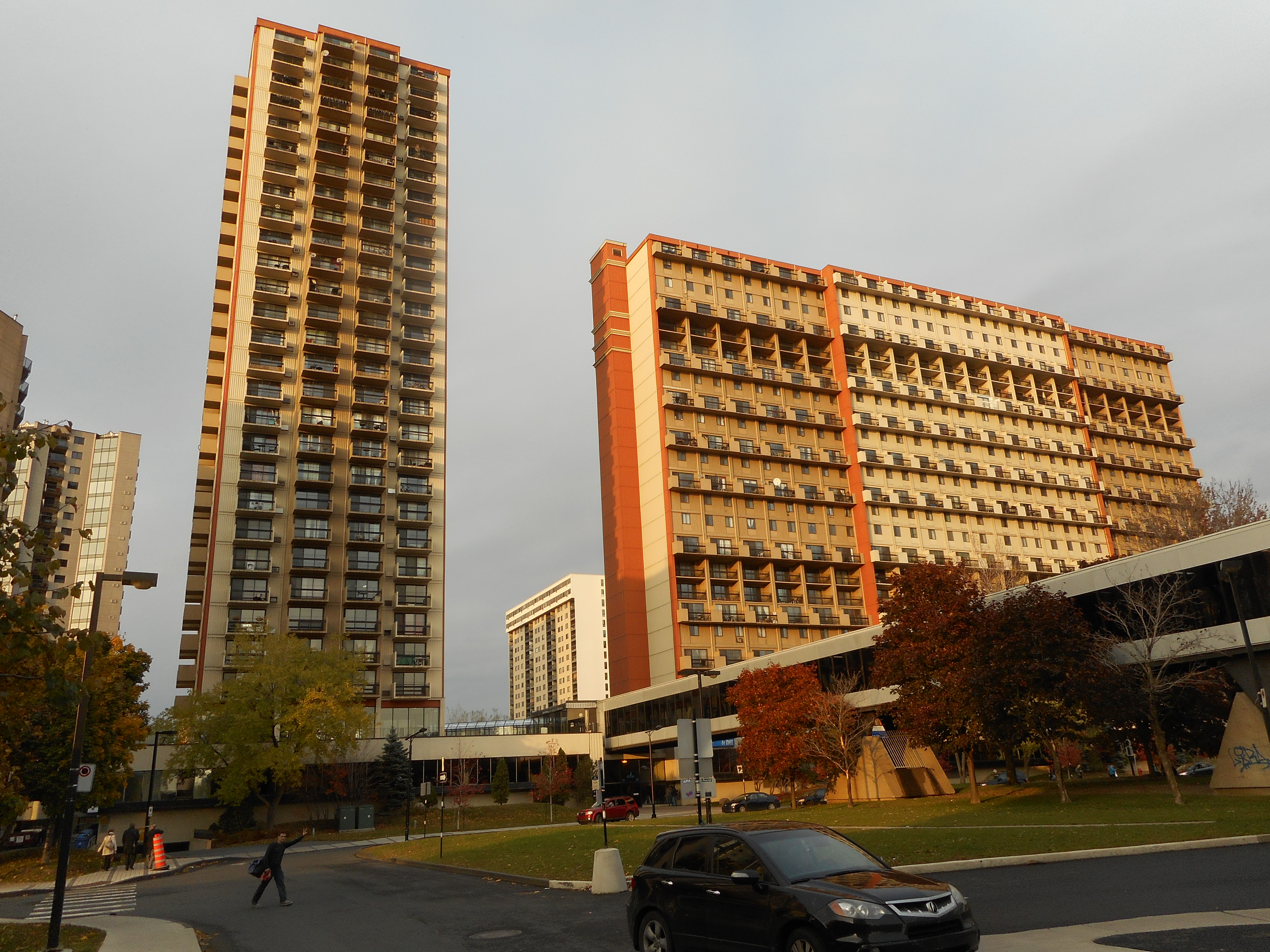
The Port de Mer residential complex. The tower on the left was the tallest building in Longueuil from 1972 to 2026.

=== Place Charles-Le Moyne ===
Place Charles-Le Moyne, Longueuil's primary transit hub and business center, is in the former territory of Montreal-South. Place Charles-Le Moyne is surrounded by major highways, Autoroute 20/Route 132 near the river in the north, the entrance ramp of Jacques-Cartier Bridge to the west, and Taschereau Boulevard to the south and east.

It is the location of the Longueuil bus terminus and Longueuil-Université-de-Sherbrooke metro station, the busiest of the Montreal Metro during rush hour and the terminus of the Yellow line.

Longueuil's skycrapers are located in this area. There is also a hotel on de Sérigny street. Since 1972, the hotel has carried the banners Holiday Inn, Ramada, Radisson and now Sandman.

Université de Sherbrooke constructed a campus in the area, including a 16-story tower in 2010.

The city of Longueuil announced in 2017 that it is seeking $3 billion to invest in the area. The project is to turn the entire area into a new downtown by 2035. The plan includes multiple new residential and office buildings, creating direct access to the nearby Saint Lawrence River for recreational use, and improved cycling and pedestrian access.

=== Place Longueuil ===
Also located within the former municipal boundaries of Montreal-South is Place Longueuil, a shopping centre located 500 metres (500 yards) from Place Charles-Le Moyne.

Place Longueuil was the first shopping mall in Longueuil when it opened in 1966 and is now the largest indoor shopping centre within city limits. Place Longueuil lies between Place Charles-Le Moyne and rue St-Charles, the commercial street in Old Longueuil.

== Government ==
The city hall of Montreal-South was last located on 600 Préfontaine avenue. Before 1957, the city hall was on 1195 Victoria avenue. (Note: Victoria was renamed Saint-Laurent street during the 1961 merger since the latter was already the name for the portion of this street in Longueuil. Victoria avenue in Montreal-South should not be confused with the nearby Victoria street in Ville Jacques-Cartier that was eventually renamed to Jean-Béliveau street in 2015.)

Mayors of Montreal-South
Mayor	Term Began	Term Ended
John Smillie	1906	1910
Napoléon Labonté	1910	1912
John Smillie	1912	1916
Edmond Hardy	1916	1924
David McQuaid	1924	1932
Henry Hamer	1932	1936
Clément Patenaude	1936	1938
Harry T. Palmer (resigned)	1938	1939
James Brindley (resigned)	1939	1942
Robert Gault Keers	1942	1948
Édouard Richer	1948	1950
Aimé Lefebvre	1950	1952
Marcel Salette	1952	1958
Sylva Charland	1958	1961

== Population ==
Montreal-South merged with Longueuil on January 28, 1961.

Historical populations
Year	Pop.	±%
1911	790	—
1921	1,030	+30.4%
1931	1,164	+13.0%
1941	1,441	+23.8%
1951	4,214	+192.4%
1958	5,494	+30.4%
