= Old Longueuil =

Neighbourhood of Longueuil, Quebec

Coordinates: 45.5374°N 73.5112°W

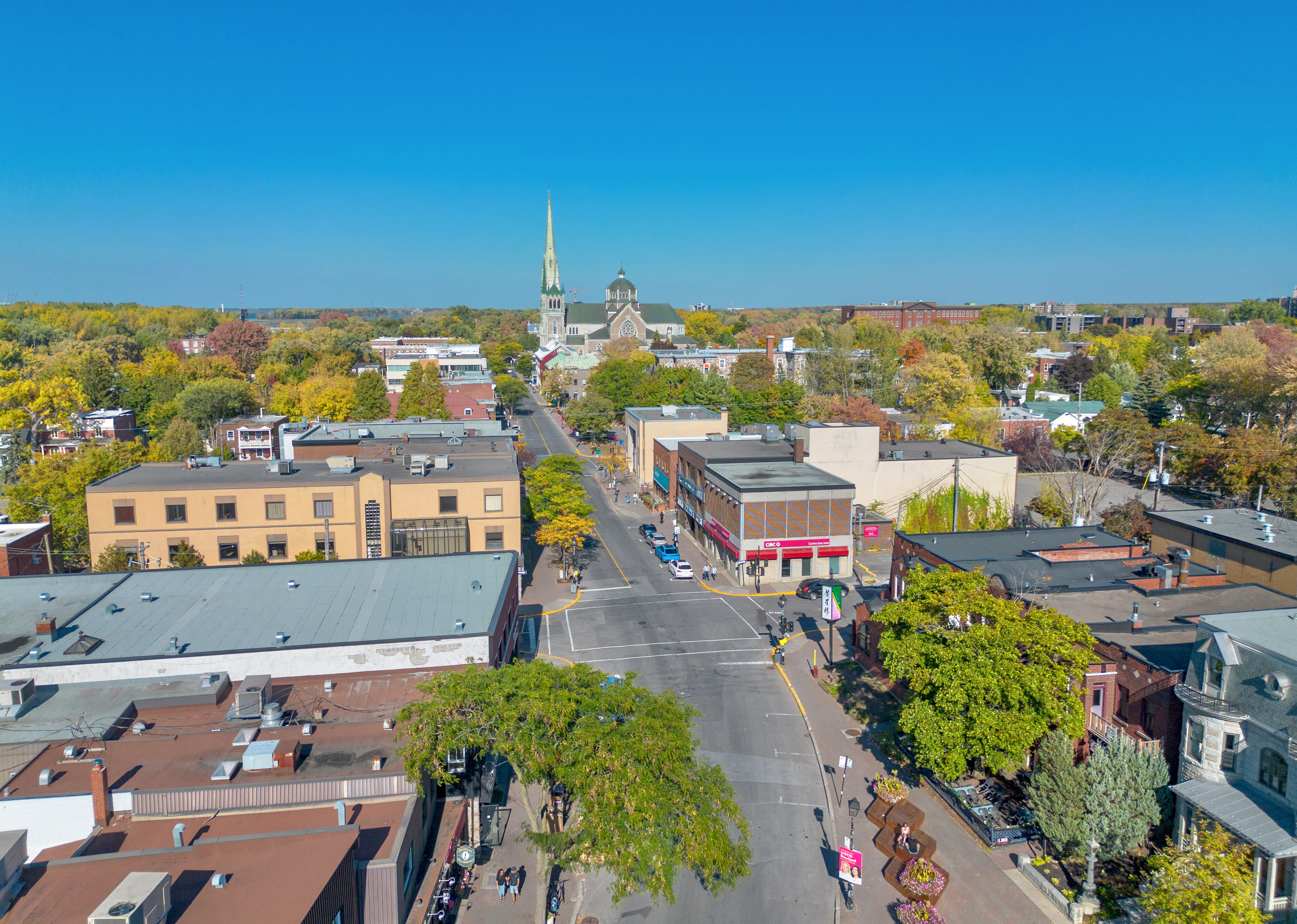
Old Longueuil in 2025

Old Longueuil (French: Vieux-Longueuil) is a historic neighbourhood located in the borough of the same name, in the city of Longueuil, Quebec, Canada. The neighbourhood essentially corresponds to the pre-1961 city of Longueuil and is bordered to the west by Joliette street, north by Saint Lawrence River and east by d'Augerne street, while its southern limits varies from one source to another but can go as far as De Gentilly street in some definitions.

Old Longueuil was named a heritage district by the city in 1993, and features 450 buildings built before 1945. Many historic buildings are found in this district, such as the Co-Cathedral of Saint-Antoine-de-Padoue, the ruins of Fort Longueuil, and Saint Mark's Anglican Church. Rue Saint-Charles, one block inland from the Saint Lawrence River, is the main street in this neighbourhood and features many small businesses, among them restaurants, bars, and corner stores. The borough hall of Le Vieux-Longueuil borough is also in the neighbourhood.
