= Louise Beaudoin =

Canadian politician (born 1945)

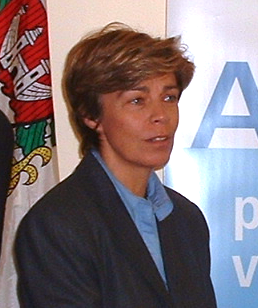
- Beaudoin during a visit to Chambly

Quebec Minister of International Affairs
- In office December 15, 1998 – April 29, 2003
- Premier: Lucien Bouchard; Bernard Landry
- Preceded by: Sylvain Simard
- Succeeded by: Monique Gagnon-Tremblay
- In office October 6, 1985 – December 12, 1985
- Premier: Pierre Marc Johnson
- Preceded by: Bernard Landry
- Succeeded by: Gil Rémillard

Quebec Minister of Culture and Communications
- In office August 3, 1995 – December 15, 1998
- Premier: Jacques Parizeau; Lucien Bouchard
- Preceded by: Jacques Parizeau
- Succeeded by: Agnès Maltais
Parliamentary constituencies
Member of the National Assembly of Quebec
In office December 8, 2008 – September 4, 2012
Preceded by	Rita Dionne-Marsolais
Succeeded by	Jean-François Lisée
Constituency	Rosemont
In office September 12, 1994 – April 14, 2003
Preceded by	Lucienne Robillard
Succeeded by	Diane Legault
Constituency	Chambly

Personal details
- Born: September 26, 1945 (age 80) Quebec City, Quebec, Canada
- Party: Parti Québécois → Independent → Parti Québécois

Louise Beaudoin (French pronunciation: [lwiz bodwɛ̃]; born September 26, 1945) is a Canadian politician who represented the electoral district of Rosemont in the National Assembly of Quebec until 2012, as a member of the Parti Québécois (PQ). She sat as an independent from June 6, 2011 to April 3, 2012. She is best known for her previous tenure as a Member of the National Assembly (MNA) for Chambly, from 1994 to 2003, when she occupied various ministerial positions.

== Biography ==
Beaudoin earned a master's degree in history from Université Laval and a master's degree in sociology at the Sorbonne. As a student, like many contemporaries, she was associated with Quebec separatists.

In the 1970s, she worked at the École nationale d'administration publique (ENAP). She was also director of Claude Morin's office. Posted to the Délégation générale du Québec à Paris from 1984–1985, she was close to René Lévesque in the last years of his life.

Beaudoin was elected as a péquiste in the riding of Chambly in 1994, and re-elected in 1998.

During her time as MNA of Chambly, Beaudoin had several portfolios. At various times she was the minister responsible for the Charter of the French Language, international relations, intergovernmental relations, La Francophonie, Culture and Communications, and globalization. She received some English press coverage for her spirited defence of Bill 101 on an episode of 60 Minutes. Her stringent enforcement of Bill 101 didn't play well with the Anglophone communities in Quebec, and she was famously portrayed as a leather-clad dominatrix by popular Montreal Gazette cartoonist Aislin. On several occasions she has made controversial remarks about culture, claiming, for example, that multiculturalism is a Canadian value but not a Quebec one. With Sheila Copps, the Minister for Canadian Heritage, Beaudoin also worked for the adoption of the UNESCO Universal Declaration on Cultural Diversity, voted on after the September 11 attacks in 2001. The same year, she accused the federal government of lying for not permitting Quebec premier Bernard Landry to participate in the Summit of the Americas.

After eight years as MNA of Chambly, Beaudoin was defeated by the Liberal Diane Legault in 2003. Her defeat was largely attributed to anti-PQ resentment in the Saint-Bruno area of the riding as a result of Bill 170.

After her departure from the National Assembly, she joined the Université du Québec à Montréal as a professor and there continued her studies into globalization.

She was decorated as a commandeur of the Légion d'honneur on September 23, 2004.

She did not run for the PQ in the riding of Chambly in the 2007 elections and her assistant Bertrand St-Arnaud tried to win the seat but lost to adéquiste Richard Merlini.

Beaudoin returned to the political scene in December 8, 2008 by getting elected in Rosemont to succeed the resigned Rita Dionne-Marsolais.

As of 2008, Beaudoin was a host and journalist on Radio-Canada's series 5 sur 5, which answers viewers' questions about a wide variety of topics. She has also served as director of the board for Théâtre Espace Go.

On January 20, 2009, Beaudoin, along with fellow PQ member François Rebello, attended the inauguration of Barack Obama in Washington, D.C.

On June 6, 2011, Beaudoin and caucus mates Lisette Lapointe and Pierre Curzi resigned from the Parti Québécois to sit as independents over the PQ's acceptance of a bill changing the law to permit an agreement between the City of Québec and Quebecor Inc. concerning the construction of an arena in Quebec City.

On April 3, 2012, Beaudoin rejoined the PQ caucus. She did not run for re-election in the 2012 general election.

== Electoral record ==
2008 Quebec general election: Rosemont
Party	Candidate	Votes	%	±%
Parti Québécois	Louise Beaudoin	15,220	50.66	+12.06
Liberal	Nathalie Rivard	9,557	31.81	+4.60
Québec solidaire	François Saillant	2,470	8.22	−1.15
Action démocratique	Audrey Férec	1,891	6.29	−12.64
Green	Sylvain Valiquette	816	2.72	−2.55
Marxist–Leninist	Stéphane Chénier	88	0.29	+0.07
Total valid votes		30,042	98.66	–
Total rejected ballots		408	1.34	–
Turnout		30,450	58.67	−12.19
Electors		51,903	–	–
Source: Official Results, Le Directeur général des élections du Québec.

2003 Quebec general election
Party	Candidate	Votes	%
Liberal	Diane Legault	17,656	41.85
Parti Québécois	Louise Beaudoin	16,857	39.95
Action démocratique	Denis Lavoie	6,935	16.44
Bloc Pot	Sébastien Duclos	744	1.76
Total valid votes		42,192	98.69
Total rejected ballots		561	1.31
Turnout		42,753	78.45
Electors on the lists		54,497	–

1998 Quebec general election
Party	Candidate	Votes	%
Parti Québécois	Louise Beaudoin	22,559	52.51
Liberal	Pierre Bourbonnais	15,230	35.45
Action démocratique	Jean-Sébastien Brault	4,550	10.59
Bloc Pot	Maryève Daigle	344	0.80
Independent	Serge Lebel	131	0.30
Socialist Democracy	Maryse-Laurence Lewis	117	0.27
Innovator	Herve Raymond	34	0.08
Total valid votes		42,965	99.11
Total rejected ballots		385	0.89
Turnout		43,350	84.63
Electors on the lists		51,221	–

1994 Quebec general election
Party	Candidate	Votes	%
Parti Québécois	Louise Beaudoin	19,800	48.86
Liberal	Lucienne Robillard	19,393	47.86
Natural Law	Michael Larmand	519	1.28
Development	Camille Bolté	474	1.17
Sovereignty	Pierre Mondor	336	0.83
Total valid votes		40,522	97.29
Total rejected ballots		1,130	2.71
Turnout		41,652	87.47
Electors on the lists		47,620	–
