= Michel-Dosithée-Stanislas Martel =

Canadian politician

Michel-Dosithée-Stanislas Martel (January 11, 1838 – September 18, 1908) was a physician and political figure in Quebec. He represented Chambly in the Legislative Assembly of Quebec from 1878 to 1879 and from 1881 to 1886 as a Conservative.

He was born in Verchères, Lower Canada, the son of Jean Martel and Charlotte Lamontagne, and was educated at the Collège de Montréal and the College of Medicine and Surgery at Montreal. He qualified as a physician in 1865 and set up practice at Chambly. Martel was also a justice of the peace, a captain in the militia and president of the local Saint-Jean-Baptiste Society. In 1868, he married Marie-Rose de Lima Sénécal. He served as a member of the municipal council for Chambly and was mayor from 1878 to 1879 and from 1890 to 1893, also serving as warden for Chambly County. His election in 1878 was overturned in 1879 and he lost the subsequent by-election to Raymond Préfontaine. Martel defeated Préfontaine in 1881 but lost to Antoine Rocheleau when he ran for reelection in 1886. He died in Chambly at the age of 70.
