= Dowina-Évariste Joyal =

Canadian politician

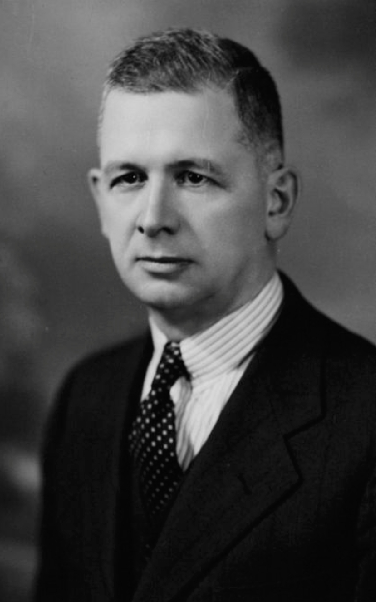

Member of the Legislative Assembly of Quebec for Chambly
- In office 1939–1948
- Preceded by: Hortensius Béïque
- Succeeded by: John Redmond Roche

Personal details
- Born: May 30, 1892 Drummondville, Quebec
- Died: January 18, 1956 (aged 63) Montreal, Quebec
- Party: Liberal

D.-Évariste Joyal, likely named Dowina-Évariste Joyal (May 30, 1892 – January 18, 1956) was a Canadian provincial politician. He was a member of the Legislative Assembly of Quebec for Chambly from 1939 to 1948.

Born in Drummondville, Quebec, he was the son of Émile Joyal, farmer, and Philomène Caron. On June 12, 1916 he married Marie Rose-Hectorine Desmarais, daughter of Hector Desmarais and Arsélia Angers. He was manager of the Bank of Montreal branch in Saint-Ours, Quebec and manager of South Shore Homes and Land Ltd. in MacKayville (Saint-Hubert) for 25 years. He was on the municipal board of the parish of Saint-Antoine de Longueuil from 1923 to 1930.

Joyal won his seat in the 1939 for the Quebec Liberal Party, and was re-elected in 1944, but defeated in 1948.

He died in Montreal aged 63 years 8 months, and is buried in the cemetery of Saint Lambert

== Name ==
The first part of his first name is given in various sources as either Dowina or Dorvina. Another source says that even Dorina, Donina et Domina were sometimes seen, and that his election posters merely said D.-E. Joyal. The version given by the National Assembly website is Dowina, which represents a correction by them from Dorvina in earlier versions of their website and in an earlier printed-book version, so perhaps this is the most reliable.
