= Paul Pratt =

22nd Mayor of Longueuil
- In office 1935–1966
- Preceded by: Alexandre Thurber
- Succeeded by: Marcel Robidas

Personal details
- Born: 25 November 1894 Longueuil, Quebec
- Died: 8 May 1967 (aged 72) Longueuil, Quebec
- Education: Conservatoire national de musique
- Occupation: Musician

Paul Pratt (25 November 1894 – 8 May 1967) was a Canadian clarinetist, pianist, conductor, music educator, composer, and public administrator. His compositional output includes marches, waltzes, a Fantaisie-Impromptu for band, and some works for solo piano.

== Life and career ==
Pratt was a clarinetist in the Symphonie Dubois in 1916–1917 and in the Canadian Grenadier Guards Band from 1919 to 1939. He was the Montreal Orchestra's bass clarinetist from 1931 to 1941 and played the contrabass clarinet for the CSM orchestra from 1935 to 1946. He also played the clarinet in the Little Symphony of Montreal and the Van der Meerschen band in St-Lambert. From 1950 to 1967 he was music director of the Metropolitan Concert Band of Montreal and from 1956 to 1957 he was president of the Canadian Band Association's Quebec and Ontario divisions. He also served for some years as the music director of the South Shore Band of Longueuil and the Gais Longueuillois Quartet.

In 1935 Pratt was elected the mayor of Longueuil. He enjoyed wide popularity in that post, and remained mayor for the next 31 years, stepping down in 1966. He was decorated twice while in office, once by George V the United Kingdom in 1935 and once by George VI of the United Kingdom in 1939, the latter for his activities in the War Campaign. He died in Longueuil in 1967 at the age of 72.
