= List of mayors of Longueuil =

This article is a list about the mayors of Longueuil, Quebec and the municipalities that were folded into Longueuil to make the current city.

== History ==
Before 1961, seven separate communities existed to form what is today known as Longueuil. They merged over the following decades, and Longueuil reached its current state.

This section lists a series of mergers involving Longueuil. In italic is the surviving municipality.

=== 1961-1969 ===
On January 28, 1961, these communities merged, keeping Longueuil's namesake:

- Longueuil
- Montréal-Sud

=== 1969-2001 ===
In 1969, Longueuil merged again with another neighbouring city:

- Longueuil
- Ville Jacques-Cartier

In October, 1971, neighbouring Saint-Hubert had a merger as well:

- Saint-Hubert
- Laflèche

=== 2002-2005 ===
On January 1, 2002, Longueuil and seven other south shore municipalities merged:

- Longueuil
- Boucherville
- Brossard
- Greenfield Park
- LeMoyne
- Saint-Bruno-de-Montarville
- Saint-Hubert
- Saint-Lambert

=== 2006-present ===
On January 1, 2006, four of the municipalities previously merged in 2002 voted to secede from Longueuil:

- Boucherville
- Brossard
- Saint-Bruno-de-Montarville
- Saint-Lambert

Therefore, Longueuil is currently composed of:

- Longueuil
- Greenfield Park
- LeMoyne
- Saint-Hubert

== List of mayors ==
=== Longueuil ===
Former Mayors of Longueuil
Mayor	Term Began	Term Ended
Isidore Hurteau	1848	1850
Charles Sabourin	1850	1853
Pierre Davignon	1853	1861
André Trudeau	1861	1862
Gédéon Larocque	1862	1870
Isidore Hurteau (again)	1870	1872
Augustin Pierre Jodoin	1872	1876
Isidore Hurteau (again)	1876	1878
vacant	1878	1880
Joseph Vincent	1880	1881
Charles Bourdon	1881	1882
Bruno Normandin	1882	1886
Pierre E. Hurteau	1886	1887
Louis E. Morin	1887	1889
Pierre Brais	1889	1891
Bruno Normandin (again)	1891	1892
Louis E. Morin (again)	1892	1893
Ovide Dufresne Jr.	1893	1896
Michel Viger	1896	1898
Maurice Perrault	1898	1902
Victor Pigeon	1902	1904
Édouard C. Lalonde	1904	1906
Bruno Normandin (again)	1906	1908
Amédée Geoffrion	1908	1912
Henri St-Mars	1912	1915
Alexandre Thurber	1915	1925
L. J. Émilien Brais	1925	1933
Alexandre Thurber (again)	1933	1935
Paul Pratt	1935	1966
Marcel Robidas	1966	1969
Roland Therrien	1969	1969
Marcel Robidas (again)	1969	1982
Jacques Finet	1982	1987
Florence Mercier	1987	1987
Roger Ferland	1987	1994
Claude Gladu	1994	2001
Jacques Olivier	2001	2005
Claude Gladu (again)	2005	2009
Caroline St-Hilaire	2009	2017
Sylvie Parent	2017	2021
Catherine Fournier	2021	incumbent

=== Merged municipalities ===
==== Montréal-Sud ====
Former Mayors of Montreal South
Mayor	Term Began	Term Ended
John Smillie	1906	1910
Napoléon Labonté	1910	1912
John Smillie	1912	1916
Edmond Hardy	1916	1924
David McQuaid	1924	1932
Henry Hamer	1932	1936
Clément Patenaude	1936	1938
Harry T. Palmer (resigned)	1938	1939
James Brindley (resigned)	1939	1942
Robert Gault Keers	1942	1948
Édouard Richer	1948	1950
Aimé Lefebvre	1950	1952
Marcel Salette	1952	1958
Sylva Charland	1958	1961

==== Ville Jacques-Cartier ====
Former Mayors of Ville Jacques-Cartier
Mayor	Term Began	Term Ended
Joseph-Rémi Goyette	1947	1949
René Prévost	1949	1954
Hector Desmarchais	1954	1955
Julien Lord	1955	1957
Joseph-Louis Chamberland	1957	1960
Léo-Aldéo Rémillard	1960	1963
Jean-Paul Tousignant (interim)	1963	1963
Charles Labrecque (interim)	1963	1963
Jean-Paul Vincent	1963	1966
Roland Therrien	1966	1969

==== Laflèche ====
Former Mayors of Laflèche
Mayor	Term Began	Term Ended
J. W. Gendron	1947	1949
Lucien Tapin	1949	1953
Édouard Charruau	1953	1957
Paul Provost	1957	1962
Henri Cyr	1962	1963
Alexandre Girard	1963	1965
Gérard Philipps	1965	1971

==== Saint-Hubert ====
Former Mayors of Saint-Hubert
Mayor	Term Began	Term Ended
André Sainte-Marie	1861	1862
Louis Brosseau	1862	1866
Jean-Baptiste Sainte-Marie	1866	1868
Laurent Benoît	1868	1870
François David	1870	1881
Toussaint Brosseau	1881	1881
Joseph Paré	1881	1890
Wilfrid Tremblay	1890	1897
Alexis Tremblay	1897	1898
Émerie Brosseau	1898	1901
Pierre-Élie Sainte-Marie	1901	1905
Aimé Guertin	1905	1907
Moïse Brosseau	1907	1908
Adelphis Lareau	1908	1909
Noël Bouthillier	1909	1910
Joseph Paré Jr.	1910	1915
Flavien Moquin	1915	1916
Arthur Barré	1916	1925
Henri Rocheleau	1925	1927
Antoine-Morille Labelle	1927	1928
Anatole Lavoie	1928	1931
André Latour	1931	1937
Hubert Guertin	1937	1949
Samuel Robinson	1949	1955
Gérard Payer	1955	1961
Euchariste Harvey	1961	1963
Norman Litchfield	1963	1968
Aldas Boileau	1968	1976
Bernard Racicot	1976	1984
Guy Desgroseillers	1984	1988
Pierre D. Girard	1988	1996
Michel Latendresse	1996	2001

==== LeMoyne ====
Former Mayors of LeMoyne
Mayor	Term Began	Term Ended
Henri Sicotte	1949	1952
Albert Bélanger	1952	1954
Jean Baribeau	1954	1967
André Charpentier	1967	1977
Michel Sicotte	1977	1981
Louise Gravel	1981	1993
Guy Talbot	1993	2001

==== Greenfield Park ====
Former Mayors of Greenfield Park
Mayor	Term Began	Term Ended
W.J. Murray	1911	1913
R. C. Chalmers	1915	1918
R. J. Walker	1918	1922
C. D. Campbell	1922	1926
R. J. Walker	1927	1928
H. W. Clark	1928	1930
E. A. Nightingale	1930	1932
S. I. Coote	1932	1940
E. F. Blackburn	1940	1942
A. G. Cobb	1942	1946
A. Perras	1946	1948
J. C. Plante	1948	1953
L. Galetti	1953	1967
Maurice King	1967	1978
Stephen Olynyck	1978	1994
Marc Duclos	1994	2001
