= Parc de la Cité =

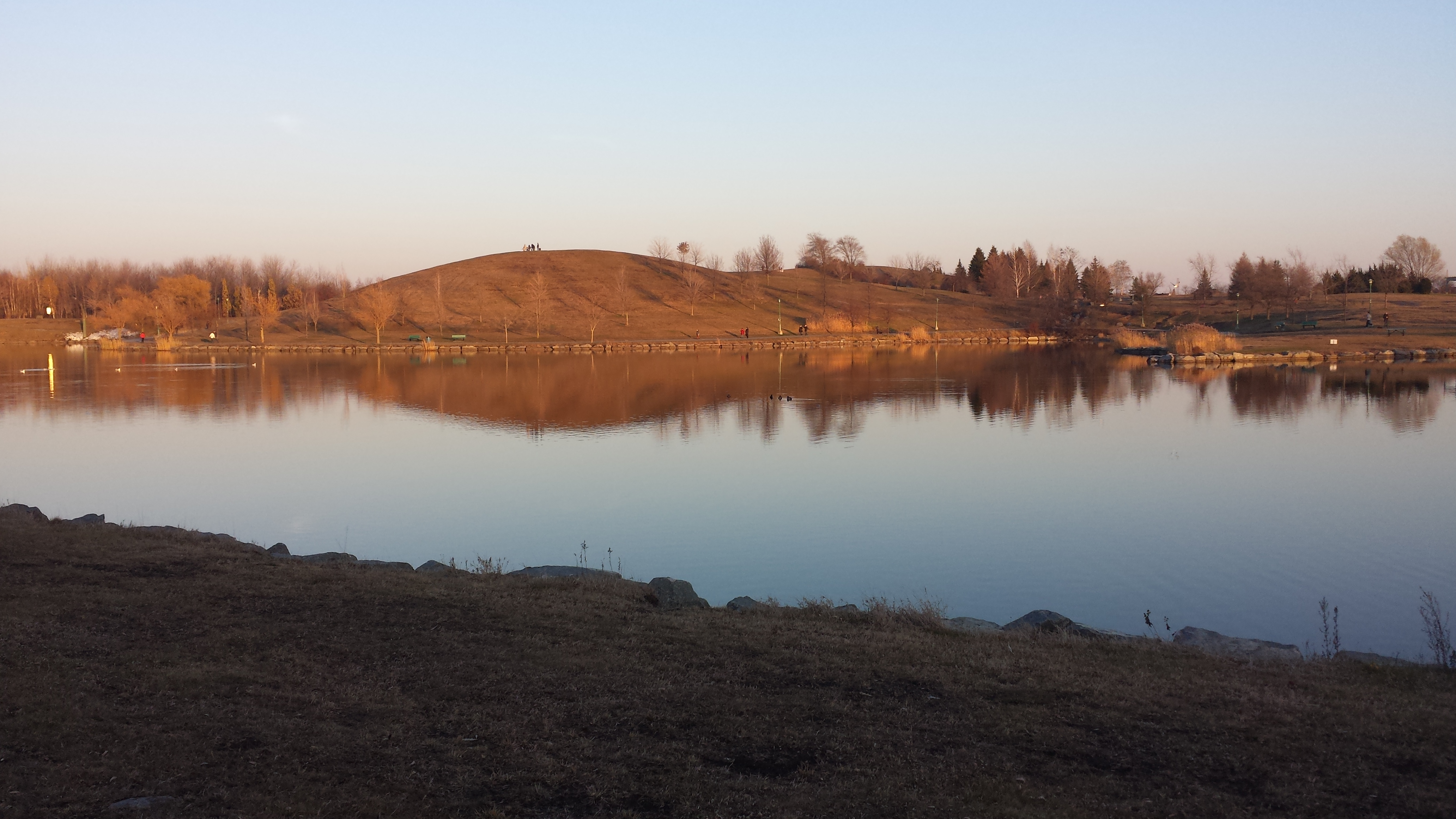
- Artificial mountain of Lac de la Cité.

- Location within Greater Montreal
- Type: Municipal park
- Location: Saint-Hubert, Longueuil, Quebec, Canada
- Nearest city: Brossard
- Coordinates: 45°29′10″N 73°24′32″W
- Area: 96 hectares (240 acres)
- Created: 1992
- Operator: City of Longueuil
- Open: Year round, 7am to 11pm

Parc de la Cité, is a large park in Longueuil, Quebec, Canada. It is located at 6205 Davis Boulevard in the borough of Saint-Hubert.

== Geography ==
This park is located between boulevard Gaétan Boucher and rue des Orchidées; between boulevard Julien Bouthillier and boulevard Cousineau. Each of these streets has an entrance to the park; another entrance is located at the end of Davis Boulevard.

The park is 960,000 square metres (10,300,000 sq ft) in area. This park has an artificial lake 1.1 km (1200 yards) long. It includes a large grass-covered field, as well as 8 kilometres (5.0 mi) of trails, one of which leads to the Raymond-Lévesque Library.

== Main attractions ==
The Route Verte's La Montée du chemin de Chambly trail runs adjacent to the park.

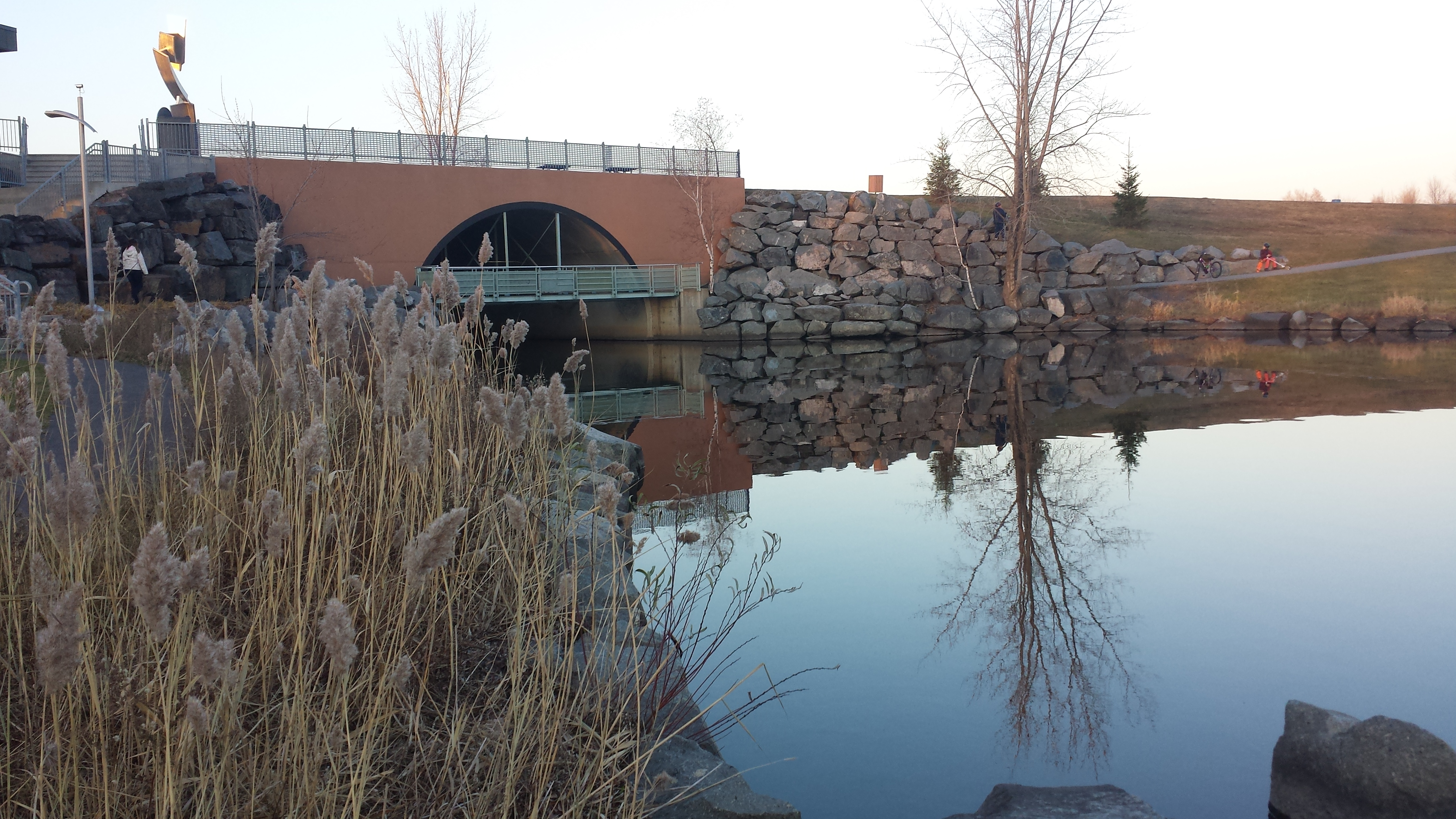
Footbridge and bridge extending Davis Boulevard and spanning Lake City

The park features a 1 square kilometre (0.39 sq mi) artificial lake, which serves as a retention basin, which is surrounded by wooded areas. A large hill overlooks the lake, and offers views of the surrounding area.

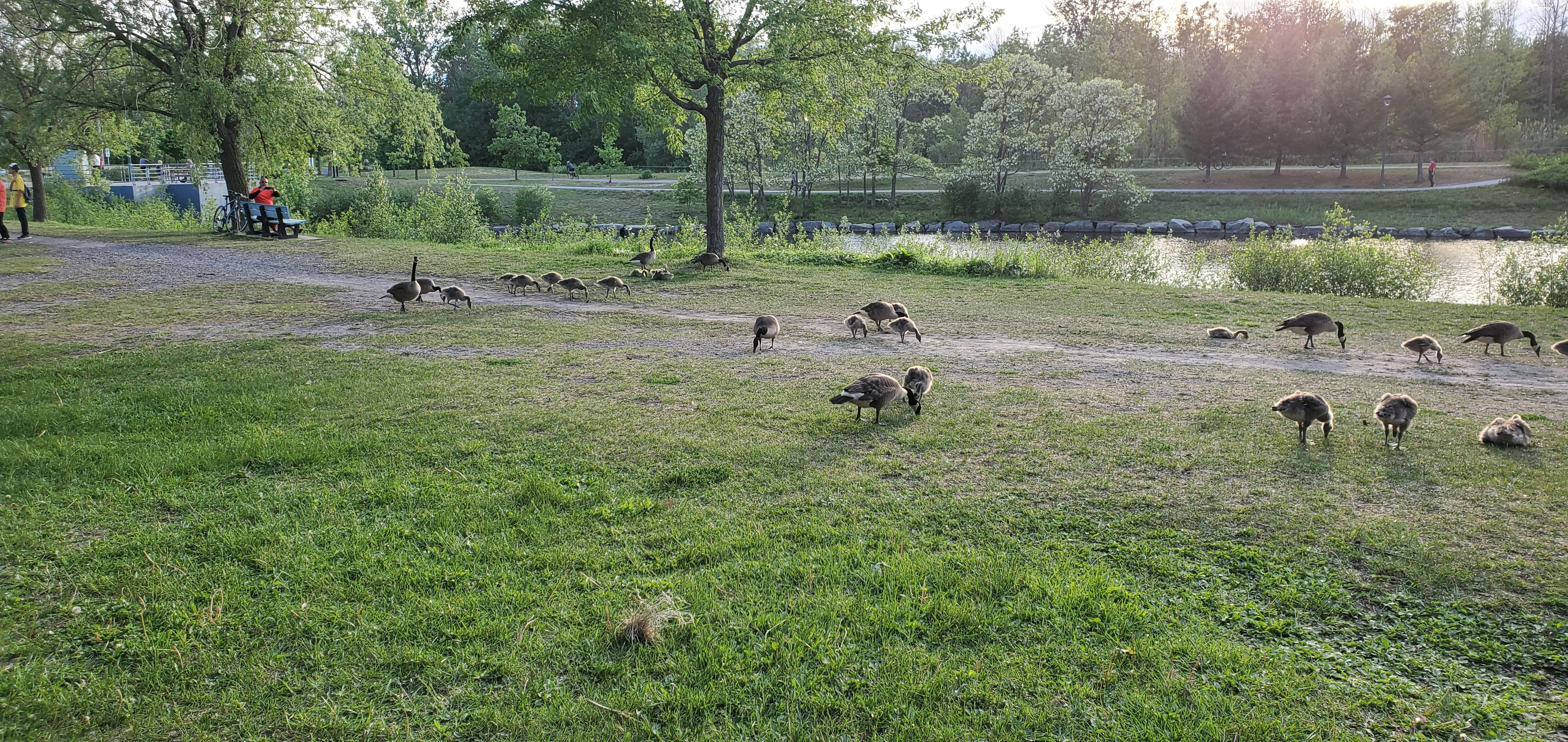
Geese at Parc de la Cité in Saint-Hubert, Quebec in June 2020

Footbridge and bridge extending Davis Boulevard and spanning Lake City

The park was created in 1992 in order to build the retention basin, and soon became heavily frequented by nearby residents.

It hosts many events each year, such as the local celebrations for the Fête nationale du Québec, as well as Lac en fête, and the grand concert presented by the Orchestre symphonique de Longueuil.

== Visitor center ==
A 550 square metres (5,920 sq ft) visitor center providing first aid services, sanitary facilities as well as a Cafe, a free parking lot and rest areas is also available. Additionally, it offers summer and winter sporting equipment rental.

== Opening hours ==
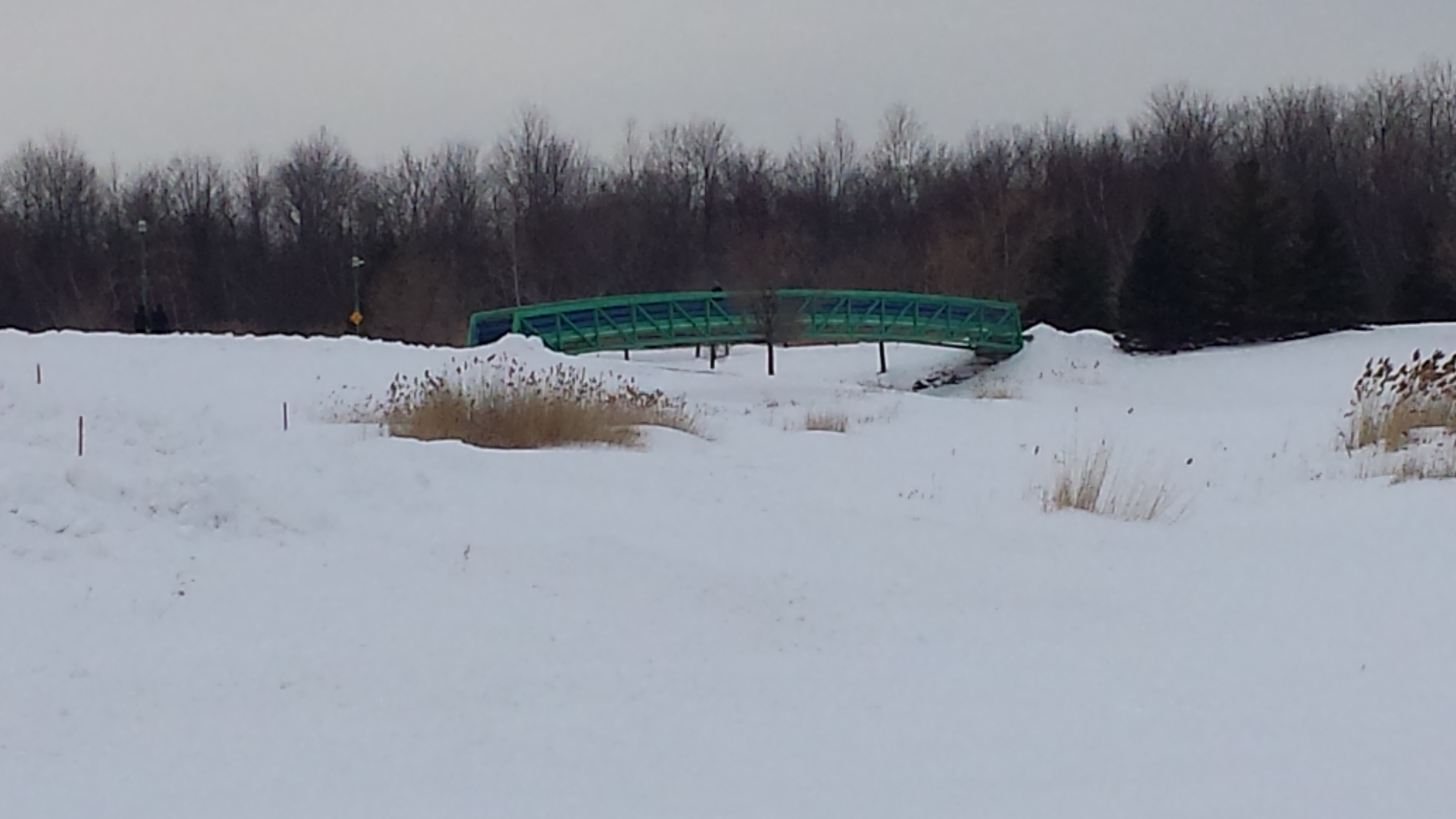
Photo taken in winter of the pedestrian bridge in Parc de la Cité.

The park is open year round from 7:00 a.m. to 11:00 p.m. The reception pavilion on Boulevard Davis is open as follows:

Period	Business hours
Mid-October to mid-December	8:30 a.m. to 8:00 p.m.
Mid-December to mid-March	8:30 a.m. to 10:30 p.m.
Mid-March to mid-June	8:30 a.m. to 8:00 p.m.
Mid-June to mid-October	8:30 a.m. to 10:30 p.m.
