= Gédéon Larocque =

Canadian politician

Member of the Legislative Assembly of Quebec for Chambly
- In office 1871–1875
- Preceded by: Jean-Baptiste Jodoin
- Succeeded by: Raymond Préfontaine

5th Mayor of Longueuil
- In office 1862–1870
- Preceded by: André Trudeau
- Succeeded by: Isidore Hurteau

Personal details
- Born: December 21, 1831 Chambly, Lower Canada
- Died: October 23, 1903 (aged 71) Montreal, Quebec
- Party: Liberal

Gédéon Larocque (December 21, 1831 – October 23, 1903) was a physician and political figure in Quebec. He represented Chambly in the Legislative Assembly of Quebec from 1871 to 1875 as a Liberal member.

== Background and early career ==
He was born in Chambly, Lower Canada, the son of Édouard Larocque and Louise Daigneau. Larocque was educated at the Collège de Chambly, the Collège de Saint-Hyacinthe and the School of Medicine and Surgery at Montreal. He qualified to practise medicine in 1855 and set up practice in Longueuil. Larocque also taught music and owned a farm at Beaumont. He was married three times: to Félicité Thibault in 1856, to Rosalie-Christine Brauners in 1870 and to Azilda Davignon in 1874.

== Mayor of Longueuil and other activities ==
He was mayor of Longueuil from 1862 to 1870 and was warden of Chambly County for four years. He was an agent for the Northern Railway. Larocque was sergeant-at-arms for the legislative assembly from 1875 to 1902. In 1883, the Quebec Parliament buildings were nearly destroyed in a fire. The mace of the legislative council and the black rod were both destroyed in the blaze. Larocque, half-dressed, ran into the burning building and saved the mace of the legislative assembly.

=== Publications ===
He wrote several instructional booklets on subjects related to agriculture including Culture et préparation du tabac in 1881 and Manuel des engrais, published in 1904.

== Death ==
He died in Montreal at the age of 71 and was buried at Longueuil.
