= Maurice Perrault =

Canadian politician (1857–1909)

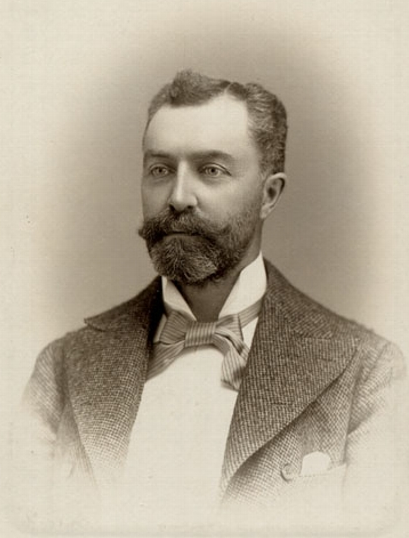
- Maurice Perrault

Member of the Legislative Assembly of Quebec for Chambly
- In office 1900–1909
- Preceded by: Antoine Rocheleau
- Succeeded by: Eugène Merrill Lesieur Desaulniers

15th Mayor of Longueuil
- In office 1898–1902
- Preceded by: Michel Viger
- Succeeded by: Victor Pigeon

Personal details
- Born: 12 June 1857 Montreal, Canada East
- Died: 11 February 1909 (aged 51) Longueuil, Quebec, Canada
- Party: Liberal
- Education: Petit Séminaire de Montréal
- Occupation: Architect at Perrault et Mesnard

Maurice Perrault (12 June 1857 – 11 February 1909) was a Canadian architect, civil engineer, and politician.

Born in Montreal, Canada East, the son of Henri-Maurice Perrault, a surveyor and architect, and Marie-Louise-Octavie Masson. Perrault studied at the Petit Séminaire de Montréal from 1867 to 1875. He studied surveying and architecture from 1875 to 1879.

In 1880, he went to work in his father's company, which was called Perrault et Mesnard. Here, he was involved in the design of Sainte-Cécile in Salaberry-de-Valleyfield (1882–84); Sainte-Anne in Varennes (1883–87); Saint-Antoine in Longueuil (1884–87); and Saint-Charles in Lachenaie (1888–90). The firm reconstructed the facade and steeple of the Notre-Dame-de-Bon-Secours Chapel. They also designed the Notre-Dame du Sacré-Coeur chapel behind the basilica, and St. Andrew's Cathedral in Victoria

In 1888, Perrault, who was of Liberal allegiance, was appointed chief architect for the district of Montreal by Premier Honoré Mercier. He was a member of the Canadian Society of Civil Engineers. He later designed Laval University, St. Denis Street, 1893–94.

In 1908 Perrault undertook the restoration of St. Hyacinth's Cathedral. He secured the foundation, and replaced the original square towers with two slender bell towers.

From 1898 to 1902, he was mayor of Longueuil, Quebec. He was elected by acclamation to the Legislative Assembly of Quebec for the electoral district of Chambly in the 1900 election. A Liberal, he was re-elected in the 1904 and 1908 election. He died in office in 1909 and was buried in the Notre Dame des Neiges Cemetery.

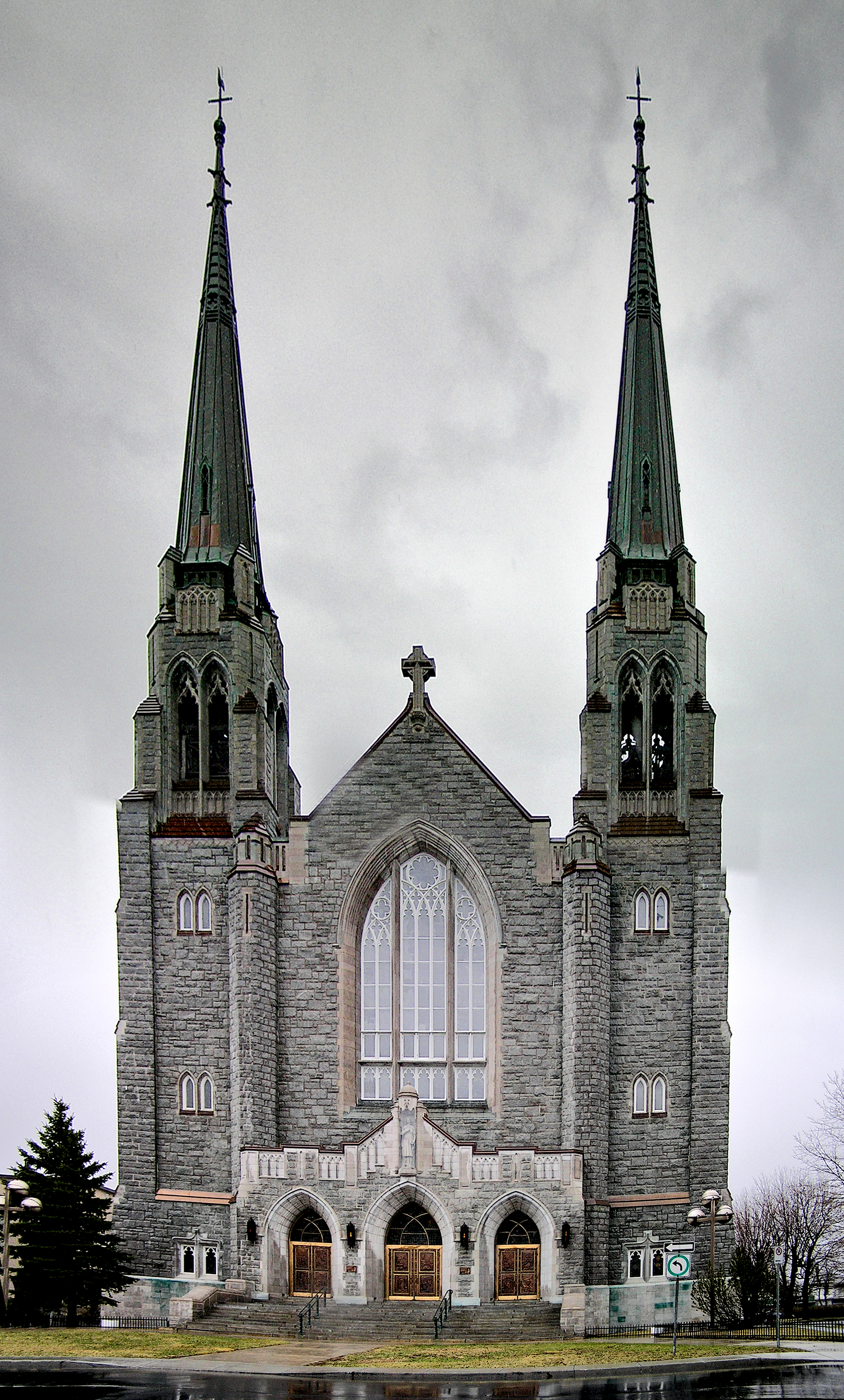
Cathedrale-Ste-Cecile

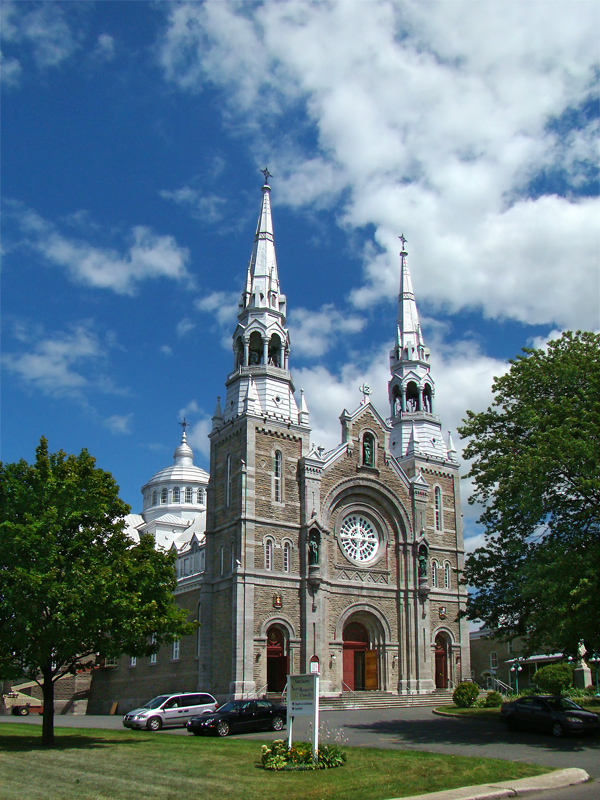
Sainte-Anne de Varennes Basilica
