= Alexandre Thurber =

Canadian politician

Member of the Legislative Assembly of Quebec for Chambly
- In office 1935–1936
- Preceded by: Hortensius Béïque
- Succeeded by: Hortensius Béïque
- In office 1923–1931
- Preceded by: Eugène Merrill Lesieur Desaulniers
- Succeeded by: Hortensius Béïque

20th Mayor of Longueuil
- In office 1933–1935
- Preceded by: L. J. Émilien Brais
- Succeeded by: Paul Pratt
- In office 1915–1925
- Preceded by: Henri St-Mars
- Succeeded by: L. J. Émilien Brais

Personal details
- Born: 2 April 1871 Montreal, Quebec
- Died: 19 April 1958 (aged 87) Montreal, Quebec
- Party: Liberal
- Spouse: Rose-Anne Larocque
- Education: Collège de Longueuil

Alexandre Thurber (April 2, 1871 – April 19, 1958) was an industrialist and political figure in Quebec. He represented Chambly in the Legislative Assembly of Quebec from 1923 to 1931 and from 1935 to 1936 as a Liberal.

He was born in Montreal, the son of Alexandre Thurber and Émiline Davignon who was the daughter of Pierre Davignon. Thurber was educated at the Collège de Longueuil. He worked as a clerk for fifteen years and then became an iron manufacturer at Longueuil. In 1894, he married Rose-Anne Larocque. Thurber served as mayor of Longueuil from 1915 to 1925 and from 1933 to 1935.

He was first elected in the 1923 Quebec general election and re-elected in 1927, but did not run for reelection to the assembly 1931. He was elected again in 1935, but defeated by Hortensius Béïque in 1936.

Thurber died in Montreal at the age of 87.
