= Longueuil Public Libraries Network =

Public library system of the city of Longueuil, Quebec, Canada

- Le réseau des bibliothèques publiques de Longueuil
- Location: Canada
- Type: Public library
- Branches: 10

Collection
- Size: 400,000 print documents, 16,500 audiovisual and multimedia documents

Access and use
- Members: 86,706

Other information
- Employees: 114
- Website: bibliotheques.longueuil.ca (in French)

The Longueuil Public Libraries Network (French: Le réseau des bibliothèques publiques de Longueuil) is the public library system of Longueuil, Quebec, Canada.

== Branches ==
There are 10 branches of the Longueul Public Libraries Network.

- Bibliothèque Claude-Henri-Grignon – 1660 rue Bourassa, Le Vieux-Longueuil
- Bibliothèque Fatima – 2130 rue Jean-Louis, Le Vieux-Longueuil
- Bibliothèque Georges-Dor – 2760 chemin de Chambly, Le Vieux-Longueuil
- Bibliothèque Hubert-Perron – 1100 rue Beauregard, Le Vieux-Longueuil
- Bibliothèque Jacques-Ferron – 100 rue Saint-Laurent Ouest, Le Vieux-Longueuil
- Bibliothèque Joseph-de-Sérigny – 1000 chemin du Lac, Le Vieux-Longueuil
- Bibliothèque Joseph-William-Gendron – École Mgr-A.-M.-Parent 3875 Grande Allée, Saint-Hubert
- Bibliothèque Raymond-Lévesque – 7025 boulevard Cousineau, Saint-Hubert
- Bibliothèque Saint-Jean-Baptiste – 700 rue Duvernay, Le Vieux-Longueuil
- Greenfield Park Library – 225 Empire Street, Greenfield Park

The Longueuil Public Libraries Network has a reciprocity agreement with Collège Édouard-Montpetit CEGEP, which grants library members access to Collège Édouard-Montpetit's library.
