= Paul Dozois =

Canadian politician (1908–1984)

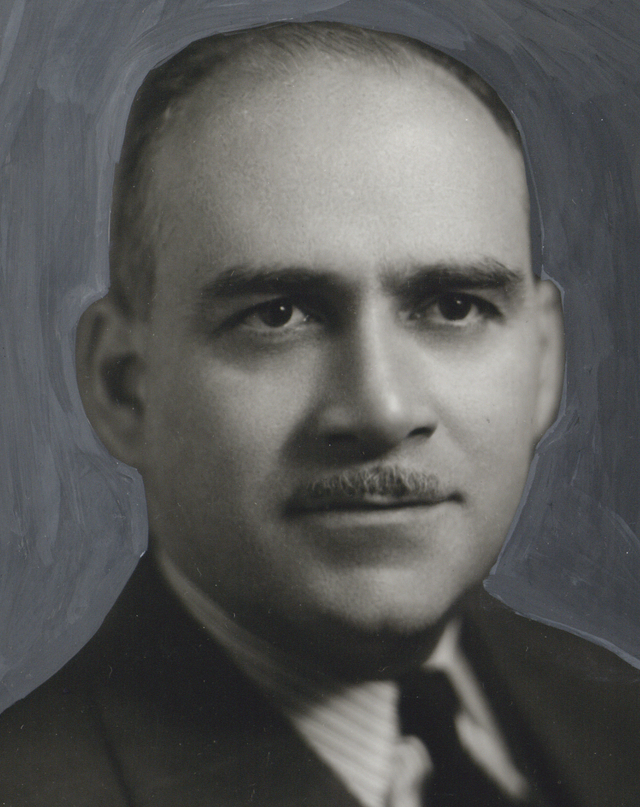
- Dozois in 1946

Member of the Legislative Assembly of Quebec for Montréal–Saint-Jacques
- In office 1956–1966
- Preceded by: Omer Côté
- Succeeded by: District was abolished in 1965

Member of the Legislative Assembly of Quebec for Saint-Jacques
- In office 1966–1969
- Preceded by: District was abolished in 1965
- Succeeded by: Jean Cournoyer

Personal details
- Born: May 23, 1908 Montreal, Quebec
- Died: July 2, 1984 (aged 76) Portland, Maine
- Resting place: Notre Dame des Neiges Cemetery
- Party: Union Nationale

Paul Dozois (May 23, 1908 – July 2, 1984) was a Canadian politician. He was a Member of the Legislative Assembly of Quebec and a city councillor in Montreal, Quebec.

He was born in Montreal on May 23, 1908 and was an insurance agent.

== City councillor ==
Dozois was appointed to the city council by the Jeune Chambre de commerce de Montréal (Young Chamber of Commerce) and served from 1942 to 1956. He was a member of Montreal's executive committee from 1947 to 1956.

== Member of the legislature ==
Dozois successfully ran as a Union Nationale candidate in the district of Montréal–Saint-Jacques in 1956 and was re-elected in 1960, 1962, and 1966.

He served as minister of municipal affairs from 1956 to 1960 and from 1966 to 1967, as well as minister of finance from 1966 to 1969.

== Retirement from politics ==
Dozois retired from political life and relinquished his seat in 1969 to accept a position on the board of administration of Hydro-Québec. He was succeeded in his riding by Jean Cournoyer.

== Death ==
Dozois died on July 2, 1984. He was entombed at the Notre Dame des Neiges Cemetery in Montreal.
