= Guy Saint-Pierre =

Canadian politician (1934–2022)

Guy Saint-Pierre CC GOQ

Member of the National Assembly of Quebec for Verchères
- In office 1970–1973
- Preceded by: Guy Lechasseur
- Succeeded by: Marcel Ostiguy

Member of the National Assembly of Quebec for Chambly
- In office 1973–1976
- Preceded by: Jean Cournoyer
- Succeeded by: Denis Lazure

Personal details
- Born: Guy Saint-Pierre; 3 August 1934 Windsor, Quebec, Canada
- Died: 23 January 2022 (aged 87) Montreal, Quebec, Canada
- Party: Quebec Liberal Party
- Spouse: Francine Garneau
- Children: 3
- Education: Université Laval; University of London; Imperial College London
- Occupation: Chairman & CEO, SNC Lavalin; Chairman, RBC Royal Bank

Guy Saint-Pierre, CC GOQ (August 3, 1934 – January 23, 2022) was a Canadian entrepreneur, business executive, politician and philanthropist. He is best known for having orchestrated the merger of SNC and Lavalin to create SNC Lavalin, the largest engineering firm in Canada and one of the largest in the world, in 1991. He also became the Chairman of the Board of the Royal Bank of Canada in 2001, being the first French Canadian to hold the position.

== Background ==
Born in Windsor, Quebec, he was the son of Armand Saint-Pierre and wife Alice Perra. Saint-Pierre graduated from Université Laval with a B.A.Sc. degree in Civil Engineering in 1957. He obtained an M.Sc. degree from the University of London in 1959 and held a D.I.C. from the Imperial College London. In 1959, Saint-Pierre joined the army as an officer in the Corps of Royal Canadian Engineers at Camp Gagetown, New Brunswick.

== Political career ==
Saint-Pierre was elected to the National Assembly of Quebec in the 1970 election in Verchères as a Liberal and re-elected in Chambly in the 1973 election. He served for two years as Minister of Education and from 1972 to 1976 as Minister of Industry and Trade.

Saint-Pierre lost his bid for re-election in the 1976 election against Parti Québécois candidate Denis Lazure.

== Later life ==
In 1978, Saint-Pierre was appointed president and general manager of Ogilvie Mills Ltd, becoming president and chief executive officer in 1980.

From January 1989, Saint-Pierre was president and chief executive officer of the SNC-Lavalin Group Inc. In 1996 he became chairman of the board, and retired in 2002.

In 1992 he was made an Officer of the Order of Canada and in 2002 he was promoted to Companion. In 2009, he was made a Grand Officer of the National Order of Quebec.

Saint-Pierre held honorary degrees from Concordia University, Université Laval, École des Hautes Études Commerciales of the Université de Montréal, Université de Sherbrooke, the University of Ottawa and le Collège militaire royal de Saint-Jean.

He served on the board of directors of Alcan Inc., BCE, Bell, General Motors of Canada, Royal Bank of Canada and SNC-Lavalin Inc. between 1990 and 2007.

== Personal life and death ==
Saint-Pierre and his wife, Francine Garneau, lived in Montreal. They had three children. He died at his home in Montreal on 23 January 2022, at the age of 87.
