= List of high commissioners of Canada to Trinidad and Tobago =

High Commissioner of Canada to Trinidad and Tobago
- Style: Excellency
- Residence: St Clair, Port of Spain
- Inaugural holder: Robert Guy Carrington Smith
- Formation: 1958
- Website: trinidadandtobago.gc.ca

The high commissioner of Canada to Trinidad and Tobago is Canada's foremost diplomatic representative in the Republic of Trinidad and Tobago.

Countries belonging to the Commonwealth of Nations typically exchange high commissioners, rather than ambassadors. Though there are a few technical differences (for instance, whereas ambassadors present their diplomatic credentials to the host country's head of state, high commissioners are accredited to the head of government), they are in practice one and the same office. The following persons have served as Canadian high commissioner to Trinidad and Tobago.

== List of heads of mission ==
=== Commissioners to Trinidad and Tobago ===
- Robert Guy Carrington Smith (1958–1962)

=== High commissioners to Trinidad and Tobago ===
- Robert Guy Carrington Smith (1962–1962)
- Eric Herbert Gilmour (1962–1966)
- James Russell McKinney (1966–1969)
- Gerald Anthony Rau (1969–1972)
- David Chalmer Reece (1972–1974)
- Angus James Matheson (1974–1977)
- James Edward Cooper (1977–1978)
- Paul-Eugène Laberge (1978–1982)
- James Byron Bissett (1982–1985)
- James Calbert Best (1985–1988)
- Rodney Irwin (1988–1990)
- Martha Dilys Buckley-Jones (1990–1993)
- Jean Nadeau (1993–1994)
- Marc C. Lemieux (1994–1997)
- Peter Lloyd (1997–2001)
- Simon Wade (2001–2005)
- Howard Strauss (2005–2009)
- Karen L. McDonald (2009–2012)
- Gérard Latulippe (2013 to 2018)
- Carla Hogan Rufelds (2018– 2019)
- Kumar Gupta (2019–2022)
