= Jean-François Roberge =

Canadian politician

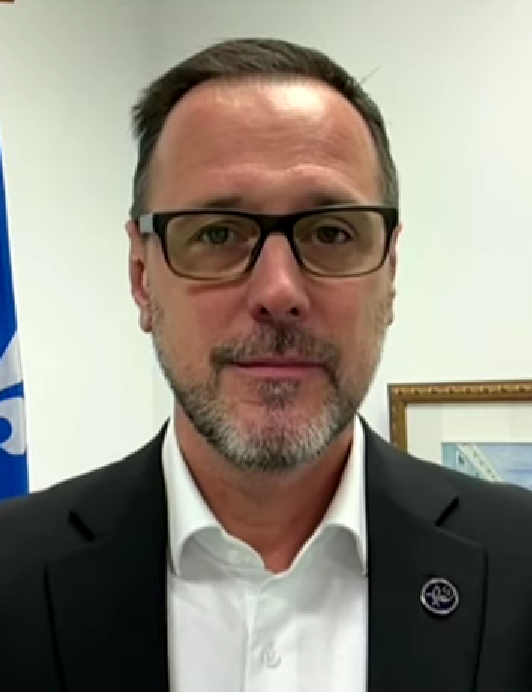
- Roberge in 2024

Minister of Education and Higher Education
- In office October 18, 2018 – October 20, 2022
- Premier: François Legault
- Preceded by: Sébastien Proulx and Hélène David
- Succeeded by: Bernard Drainville

Member of the National Assembly of Quebec for Chambly
- In office April 7, 2014 – October 5, 2026
- Preceded by: Bertrand St-Arnaud
- Succeeded by: Julie Guyot

Personal details
- Born: 17 June 1974 (age 52)
- Party: Coalition Avenir Québec

Jean-François Roberge is a Canadian politician who was elected to the National Assembly of Quebec in the 2014 election. He represented the electoral district of Chambly as a member of the Coalition Avenir Québec until 2026 and is the former Education Minister. He was replaced by Bernard Drainville in October 2022.

He was also the party's candidate in Vachon in the 2012 election.

Prior to his election to the legislature, Roberge was an elementary school teacher, as well as a regular commentator on education issues for TVA's morning talk show Deux filles le matin. He published a young adult novel, Francis perdu dans les méandres, in 2010.

== Political career ==
=== Minister of Education (2018–2022) ===
Under Roberge's term as Minister of Education, the government showed plans to replace the Ethics and religious culture, with a new curriculum which would shift the focus from religion toward culture and citizenship.

Also, as Minister Roberge saw, the CAQ government passed Bill 40, which saw the French and English school boards being replaced with School service centres. The abolishing of school boards is said to save the government more than $10 million. Their reason for this is to try to improve the quality of education in Quebec.

The English school boards of Quebec invoked Article 23 of the Canadian Charter of Rights and Freedom, which is the official language minority education rights. They took legal action to get exempted from Bill 40.

Roberge was replaced by Bernard Drainville in October 2022.

=== Later career ===
Roberge was later appointed as the Minister for Immigration, Minister for the French Language, and Minister of Secularism in the government of François Legault.

On December 6, 2022, Minister Roberge tabled a bill that would make the Oath of Allegiance to the King optional for members of the National Assembly (MNAs). That bill passed on December 9, 2022.

In August 2025, Roberge introduced a bill to ban prayer in public, citing "a proliferation of street prayer".

In September 2025, Roberge announced that the provincial government and municipal governments would be directed to stop using gender-inclusive suffixes, alternatives, and doublets in official communications.

On November 27, 2025, Roberge tabled Bill 9 that would strengthen secularism Bill 21. The bill passed on April 2, 2026. It bans the wearing of religious symbols for daycare workers and prayer spaces in public institutions.

== Electoral record ==
2022 Quebec general election: Chambly
Party	Candidate	Votes	%	±%
Coalition Avenir Québec	Jean-François Roberge	18,500	48.47	
Parti Québécois	Marie-Laurence Desgagné	6,831	17.90	
Québec solidaire	Vincent Michaux-St-Louis	6,250	16.37	
Conservative	Daniel Desnoyers	3,181	8.33	
Liberal	Lina Yunes	2,997	7.85	
Climat Québec	Sanae Chahad	341	0.89	–
Démocratie directe	Caroline Boisvert	70	0.18	–
Total valid votes		38,170	–	
Total rejected ballots		460	–	
Turnout		38,630		
Electors on the lists		52,394	–	–
Source(s) "Results of October 3, 2022 general election". Élections Québec.

2018 Quebec general election: Chambly
Party	Candidate	Votes	%	±%
Coalition Avenir Québec	Jean-François Roberge	18,940	50.26	+16.02
Parti Québécois	Christian Picard	6,564	17.42	-15.67
Québec solidaire	Francis Vigeant	6,177	16.39	+9
Liberal	François Villeneuve	4,599	12.2	-10.01
Green	Camille B. Jannard	683	1.81	+0.7
Conservative	Guy L'Heureux	309	0.82	+0.42
New Democratic	Gilles Létourneau	180	0.48	
Bloc Pot	Benjamin Vachon	167	0.44	
CINQ	Gilles Guindon	66	0.18	
Total valid votes		37,685	98.64	
Total rejected ballots		518	1.36	
Turnout		38,203	75.35	
Eligible voters		50,699		
Coalition Avenir Québec hold		Swing		+15.85
Source(s) "Rapport des résultats officiels du scrutin". Élections Québec.

2014 Quebec general election
Party	Candidate	Votes	%	±%
Coalition Avenir Québec	Jean-François Roberge	12,130	34.24	+0.08
Parti Québécois	Bertrand St-Arnaud	11,722	33.09	-7.04
Liberal	Magdala Ferdinand	7,869	22.21	+5.73
Québec solidaire	Francis Vigeant	2,618	7.39	+2.40
Green	Mary Harper	392	1.11	-0.58
Parti nul	Vincent Dessureault	353	1.00	
Option nationale	Martin Laramée	200	0.56	-1.47
Conservative	Michael Maher	140	0.40	-0.13
Total valid votes		35,424	98.65	–
Total rejected ballots		483	1.35	–
Turnout		35,907	76.62	
Electors on the lists		46,866	–	–
Coalition Avenir Québec gain from Parti Québécois		Swing		+3.56

2012 Quebec general election
Party	Candidate	Votes	%	±%
Parti Québécois	Bertrand St-Arnaud	15,104	40.13	-3.45
Coalition Avenir Québec	Martin Trudeau	12,857	34.16	+17.32
Liberal	Julie Tremblay	6,203	16.48	-15.14
Québec solidaire	Anne Poussard	1,878	4.99	+2.38
Option nationale	Martin Laramée	765	2.03	
Green	Nicolas Lescarbeau	633	1.68	-1.26
Conservative	Daniel Nicol	199	0.53	
Total valid votes		37,639	98.95	–
Total rejected ballots		400	1.05	–
Turnout		38,039	83.50	
Electors on the lists		45,554	–	–
Parti Québécois hold		Swing		-10.39
