= Chambly (provincial electoral district) =

Provincial electoral district in the Montérégie region of Quebec, Canada

Coordinates: 45.454°N 73.264°W

Quebec electoral district

Provincial electoral district
- Legislature: National Assembly of Quebec
MNA
Julie Guyot
Parti Québécois
- District created: 1867
- First contested: 1867
- Last contested: 2026

Demographics
- Electors (2012): 45,310
- Area (km²): 211.7
- Census division(s): La Vallée-du-Richelieu (part), Rouville (part)
- Census subdivision(s): Carignan, Chambly, Richelieu, Saint-Basile-le-Grand, Saint-Mathias-sur-Richelieu

Chambly (French pronunciation: [ʃɑ̃bli]) is a provincial electoral district in the Montérégie region of Quebec, Canada. It includes the city of Chambly and other smaller municipalities.

It was created for the 1867 election (and an electoral district of that name existed earlier in the Legislative Assembly of the Province of Canada and the Legislative Assembly of Lower Canada).

In the change from the 2001 to the 2011 electoral map, it lost Saint-Bruno-de-Montarville to the newly created Montarville electoral district.

== Members of the Legislative Assembly / National Assembly ==
Legislature	Years	Member	Party
1st	1867–1871	Jean-Baptiste Jodoin	Conservative
2nd	1871–1875	Gédéon Larocque	Liberal
3rd	1875–1878	Raymond Préfontaine	Liberal
4th	1878–1879	Michel-Dosithée-Stanislas Martel	Conservative
4th	1879–1881	Raymond Préfontaine	Liberal
5th	1881–1886	Michel-Dosithée-Stanislas Martel	Conservative
6th	1886–1890	Antoine Rocheleau	Liberal
7th	1890–1892	Antoine Rocheleau	Liberal
8th	1892–1897	Louis-Olivier Taillon	Conservative
9th	1897–1900	Antoine Rocheleau	Liberal
10th	1900–1904	Maurice Perrault	Liberal
11th	1904–1908	Maurice Perrault	Liberal
12th	1908–1909†	Maurice Perrault	Liberal
12th	1909–1912	Eugène Merril Desaulniers	Liberal
13th	1912–1916	Eugène Merril Desaulniers	Liberal
14th	1916–1919	Eugène Merril Desaulniers	Liberal
15th	1919–1923	Eugène Merril Desaulniers	Liberal
16th	1923–1927	Alexandre Thurber	Liberal
17th	1927–1931	Alexandre Thurber	Liberal
18th	1931–1935	Hortensius Béïque	Conservative
19th	1935–1936	Alexandre Thurber	Liberal
20th	1936–1939	Hortensius Béïque	Union Nationale
21st	1939–1944	Dowina-Évariste Joyal	Liberal
22nd	1944–1948	Dowina-Évariste Joyal	Liberal
23rd	1948–1952	John Redmond Roche	Union Nationale
24th	1952–1956	John Redmond Roche	Union Nationale
25th	1956–1960	Robert Théberge	Liberal
26th	1960–1961	Robert Théberge	Liberal
26th	1961–1962	Pierre Laporte	Liberal
27th	1962–1966	Pierre Laporte	Liberal
28th	1966–1970	Pierre Laporte	Liberal
29th	1970–1970†	Pierre Laporte	Liberal
29th	1971–1973	Jean Cournoyer	Liberal
30th	1973–1976	Guy Saint-Pierre	Liberal
31st	1976–1981	Denis Lazure	Parti Québécois
32nd	1981–1985	Luc Tremblay	Parti Québécois
33rd	1985–1989	Gérard Latulippe	Liberal
34th	1989–1994	Lucienne Robillard	Liberal
35th	1994–1998	Louise Beaudoin	Parti Québécois
36th	1998–2003	Louise Beaudoin	Parti Québécois
37th	2003–2007	Diane Legault	Liberal
38th	2007–2008	Richard Merlini	Action démocratique
39th	2008–2012	Bertrand St-Arnaud	Parti Québécois
40th	2012–2014	Bertrand St-Arnaud	Parti Québécois
41st	2014–2018	Jean-François Roberge	Coalition Avenir Québec
42nd	2018–2022	Jean-François Roberge	Coalition Avenir Québec
43rd	2022–2026	Jean-François Roberge	Coalition Avenir Québec
44th	2026–Present	Julie Guyot	Parti Québécois

== Election results ==
2026 Quebec general election
** Preliminary results — Not yet official **
Party	Candidate	Votes	%	±%
Parti Québécois	Julie Guyot	13,885	34.28	+16.38
Liberal	Sarah Belbey	7,793	19.24	+11.39
Coalition Avenir Québec	Jean-François Roberge	7,646	18.87	–29.60
Conservative	Margarita Kantor	5,900	14.56	+6.23
Québec solidaire	Jessyca Sorel	4,510	11.13	–5.24
Parti culinaire du Québec	François Pellerin	376	0.93	N/A
Climat Québec	Frédéric Ouellet	165	0.41	–0.48
Independent	Caroline Boisvert	162	0.40	N/A
Démocratie directe	Marc-André Legault	73	0.18	±0.00
Total valid votes		40,510	98.57	
Total rejected ballots		588	1.43	
Turnout		41,098	75.33	+1.60
Electors on the lists		54,555		
Parti Québécois gain from Coalition Avenir Québec		Swing		+2.50
Source: Élections Québec

2022 Quebec general election
Party	Candidate	Votes	%	±%
Coalition Avenir Québec	Jean-François Roberge	18,500	48.47	
Parti Québécois	Marie-Laurence Desgagné	6,831	17.90	
Québec solidaire	Vincent Michaux-St-Louis	6,250	16.37	
Conservative	Daniel Desnoyers	3,181	8.33	
Liberal	Lina Yunes	2,997	7.85	
Climat Québec	Sanae Chahad	341	0.89	–
Démocratie directe	Caroline Boisvert	70	0.18	–
Total valid votes		38,170	–	
Total rejected ballots		460	–	
Turnout		38,630		
Electors on the lists		52,394	–	–
Source(s) "Results of October 3, 2022 general election". Élections Québec.

2018 Quebec general election
Party	Candidate	Votes	%	±%
Coalition Avenir Québec	Jean-François Roberge	18,940	50.26	+16.02
Parti Québécois	Christian Picard	6,564	17.42	-15.67
Québec solidaire	Francis Vigeant	6,177	16.39	+9
Liberal	François Villeneuve	4,599	12.2	-10.01
Green	Camille B. Jannard	683	1.81	+0.7
Conservative	Guy L'Heureux	309	0.82	+0.42
New Democratic	Gilles Létourneau	180	0.48	
Bloc Pot	Benjamin Vachon	167	0.44	
CINQ	Gilles Guindon	66	0.18	
Total valid votes		37,685	98.64	
Total rejected ballots		518	1.36	
Turnout		38,203	75.35	
Eligible voters		50,699		
Coalition Avenir Québec hold		Swing		+15.85
Source(s) "Rapport des résultats officiels du scrutin". Élections Québec.

2014 Quebec general election
Party	Candidate	Votes	%	±%
Coalition Avenir Québec	Jean-François Roberge	12,130	34.24	+0.08
Parti Québécois	Bertrand St-Arnaud	11,722	33.09	-7.04
Liberal	Magdala Ferdinand	7,869	22.21	+5.73
Québec solidaire	Francis Vigeant	2,618	7.39	+2.40
Green	Mary Harper	392	1.11	-0.58
Parti nul	Vincent Dessureault	353	1.00	
Option nationale	Martin Laramée	200	0.56	-1.47
Conservative	Michael Maher	140	0.40	-0.13
Total valid votes		35,424	98.65	–
Total rejected ballots		483	1.35	–
Turnout		35,907	76.62	
Electors on the lists		46,866	–	–
Coalition Avenir Québec gain from Parti Québécois		Swing		+3.56

2012 Quebec general election
Party	Candidate	Votes	%	±%
Parti Québécois	Bertrand St-Arnaud	15,104	40.13	-3.45
Coalition Avenir Québec	Martin Trudeau	12,857	34.16	+17.32
Liberal	Julie Tremblay	6,203	16.48	-15.14
Québec solidaire	Anne Poussard	1,878	4.99	+2.38
Option nationale	Martin Laramée	765	2.03	
Green	Nicolas Lescarbeau	633	1.68	-1.26
Conservative	Daniel Nicol	199	0.53	
Total valid votes		37,639	98.95	–
Total rejected ballots		400	1.05	–
Turnout		38,039	83.50	
Electors on the lists		45,554	–	–
Parti Québécois hold		Swing		-10.39

^ Change is from redistributed results. CAQ change is from ADQ.

2008 Quebec general election
Party	Candidate	Votes	%
Parti Québécois	Bertrand St-Arnaud	16,049	40.01
Liberal	Stéphanie Doyon	14,485	36.11
Action démocratique	Richard Merlini	6,455	16.09
Green	Nicolas Lescarbeau	1,200	2.99
Québec solidaire	Jocelyn Roy	1,167	2.91
Parti indépendantiste	Ghislain Lebel	758	1.89

2007 Quebec general election
Party	Candidate	Votes	%
Action démocratique	Richard Merlini	18,154	38.93
Parti Québécois	Bertrand St-Arnaud	13,450	28.84
Liberal	Marc Tanguay	11,240	24.10
Green	Marie-Mars Adam	2,265	4.86
Québec solidaire	Alain Dubois	1,527	3.27
Total valid votes		46,636	99.19
Total rejected ballots		382	0.81
Turnout		47,018	79.58
Electors on the lists		59,086	–

2003 Quebec general election
Party	Candidate	Votes	%
Liberal	Diane Legault	17,656	41.85
Parti Québécois	Louise Beaudoin	16,857	39.95
Action démocratique	Denis Lavoie	6,935	16.44
Bloc Pot	Sébastien Duclos	744	1.76
Total valid votes		42,192	98.69
Total rejected ballots		561	1.31
Turnout		42,753	78.45
Electors on the lists		54,497	–

1998 Quebec general election
Party	Candidate	Votes	%
Parti Québécois	Louise Beaudoin	22,559	52.51
Liberal	Pierre Bourbonnais	15,230	35.45
Action démocratique	Jean-Sébastien Brault	4,550	10.59
Bloc Pot	Maryève Daigle	344	0.80
Independent	Serge Lebel	131	0.30
Socialist Democracy	Maryse-Laurence Lewis	117	0.27
Innovator	Herve Raymond	34	0.08
Total valid votes		42,965	99.11
Total rejected ballots		385	0.89
Turnout		43,350	84.63
Electors on the lists		51,221	–

1995 Quebec referendum
Side	Votes	%
Oui	25,363	54.95
Non	20,793	45.05

1994 Quebec general election
Party	Candidate	Votes	%
Parti Québécois	Louise Beaudoin	19,800	48.86
Liberal	Lucienne Robillard	19,393	47.86
Natural Law	Michael Larmand	519	1.28
Development	Camille Bolté	474	1.17
Sovereignty	Pierre Mondor	336	0.83
Total valid votes		40,522	97.29
Total rejected ballots		1,130	2.71
Turnout		41,652	87.47
Electors on the lists		47,620	–

1992 Charlottetown Accord referendum
Side	Votes	%
Non	23,779	60.98
Oui	15,214	39.02

1989 Quebec general election
Party	Candidate	Votes	%
Liberal	Lucienne Robillard	15,435	48.62
Parti Québécois	Monique Richer	12,939	40.76
Green	Jocelyne Décary	2,797	8.81
Parti indépendantiste	Henri Laflamme	572	1.80
Total valid votes		31,743	96.69
Total rejected ballots		1,087	3.31
Turnout		32,830	80.37
Electors on the lists		40,847	–

1985 Quebec general election
Party	Candidate	Votes	%
Liberal	Gérard Latulippe	12,356	63.81
Parti Québécois	Luc Tremblay	12,325	41.22
New Democratic	Frédéric Henderson	1,096	3.67
Christian Socialism	Johanne Sévigny	151	0.50
Total valid votes		29,902	97.95
Total rejected ballots		625	2.05
Turnout		30,527	81.61
Electors on the lists		37,405	–

1981 Quebec general election
Party	Candidate	Votes	%	±%
Parti Québécois	Luc Tremblay	15,189	51.39	+4.07
Liberal	Marcellin Tremblay	13,544	45.83	+10.22
Union Nationale	Marc Tanguay	752	2.54	-12.71
Communist	Hervé Fuyet	70	0.24	
Total valid votes		29,555	99.02	
Total rejected ballots		294	0.98	
Turnout		29,849	87.93	
Electors on the lists		33,948	–	

1980 Quebec referendum
Side	Votes	%
Non	28,728	53.28
Oui	25,195	46.72

1976 Quebec general election
Party	Candidate	Votes	%	±%
Parti Québécois	Denis Lazure	21,029	47.32	+10.84
Liberal	Guy Saint-Pierre	15,828	35.61	-20.94
Union Nationale	Camille Barré	6,776	15.25	+13.13
Ralliement créditiste	Jerry Béland	811	1.82	-3.03
Total valid votes		44,444	98.28	
Total rejected ballots		777	1.72	
Turnout		45,221	90.62	
Electors on the lists		49,904	–	

1973 Quebec general election
Party	Candidate	Votes	%
Liberal	Guy Saint-Pierre	19,005	56.55
Parti Québécois	André Gaudreau	12,260	36.48
Ralliement créditiste	Jean-Claude Roger	1,629	4.85
Union Nationale	Pierre Pelletier	714	2.12
Total valid votes		33,608	98.46
Total rejected ballots		525	1.54
Turnout		34,133	86.44
Electors on the lists		39,487	–

Quebec provincial by-election, February 8, 1971
Party	Candidate	Votes	%	±%
Liberal	Jean Cournoyer	22,647	64.57	
Parti Québécois	Pierre Marois	11,452	32.65	
Ralliement créditiste	Clément Patry	665	1.90	
Independent	Luke G. Dougherty	267	0.76	
Independent	Lionel Desjardins	18	0.05	
United Social Credit	Jean-Paul Poulin	17	0.05	
Independent	Claude Longtin	7	0.02	
Total valid votes		35,073	100.00	
Rejected and declined votes		928		
Turnout		36,001	68.19	
Electors on the lists		52,795		
Source: Results of February 8, 1971 by-election, Élections Québec

1970 Quebec general election
Party	Candidate	Votes	%
Liberal	Pierre Laporte	25,641	56.74
Parti Québécois	Pierre Marois	14,368	31.80
Union Nationale	Clovis Langlois	3,948	8.74
Ralliement créditiste	T. Bernard Senez	1,231	2.72
Total valid votes		45,188	97.74
Total rejected ballots		1,043	2.26
Turnout		46,231	87.41
Electors on the lists		52,892	–

1966 Quebec general election
Party	Candidate	Votes	%
Liberal	Pierre Laporte	19,183	60.51
Union Nationale	Benoit Francoeur	8,207	25.89
RIN	Gaston Lécuyer	3,895	12.29
Ralliement national	Rolland Côté	418	1.32
Total valid votes		31,703	97.60
Total rejected ballots		781	2.40
Turnout		32,484	68.22
Electors on the lists		47,614	–

1962 Quebec general election
Party	Candidate	Votes	%
Liberal	Pierre Laporte	36,290	63.83
Union Nationale	Joseph-René-Jean Bruneau	19,196	33.76
Independent	Gordon Crook	778	1.38
Liberal	Fernand Bouffard	353	0.62
Independent UN	Sylvia Bonneau	235	0.41
Total valid votes		56,852	98.35
Total rejected ballots		955	1.65
Turnout		57,807	76.89
Electors on the lists		75,185	–

Quebec provincial by-election, 1961
Party	Candidate	Votes	%
Liberal	Pierre Laporte	22,537	88.35
Independent Liberal	Robert Meunier	1,229	4.82
Independent	Ovila Bédard	1,187	4.65
Independent	Roger Ménard	333	1.31
Capital familial	Henri-Georges Grenier	223	0.87
Total valid votes		25,509	97.51
Total rejected ballots		652	2.49
Turnout		26,161	37.47
Electors on the lists		69,818	–

1960 Quebec general election
Party	Candidate	Votes	%
Liberal	Robert Théberge	25,921	49.91
Union Nationale	Joseph-René-Jean Bruneau	25,322	48.76
Independent Liberal	Bernard Thivierge	688	1.32
Total valid votes		51,931	97.98
Total rejected ballots		1,072	2.02
Turnout		53,003	79.01
Electors on the lists		67,080	–

1956 Quebec general election
Party	Candidate	Votes	%
Liberal	Robert Théberge	20,031	49.43
Union Nationale	John Redmond Roche	19,264	47.53
Co-operative Commonwealth	Michel Chartrand	877	2.16
Independent Liberal	Maurice Joyal	205	0.51
Labor–Progressive	Lucien Senneville	150	0.37
Total valid votes		40,527	97.34
Total rejected ballots		1,107	2.66
Turnout		41,634	76.45
Electors on the lists		54,456	–

1952 Quebec general election
Party	Candidate	Votes	%
Union Nationale	John Redmond Roche	18,486	56.54
Liberal	Albert Bélanger	13,366	40.88
Co-operative Commonwealth	Matthew Blackwood	846	2.59
Total valid votes		32,698	98.70
Total rejected ballots		431	1.30
Turnout		33,129	74.16
Electors on the lists		44,672	–

1948 Quebec general election
Party	Candidate	Votes	%
Union Nationale	John Redmond Roche	12,197	52.04
Liberal	Dowina-Évariste Joyal	8,698	37.11
Independent UN	Augustin Delisle	1,014	4.33
Union des électeurs	Jean-Marie Saint-Pierre	869	3.71
Independent	Joseph Ménard	335	1.43
Independent	Joseph-Uldéric Gauthier	326	1.39
Total valid votes		23,439	98.79
Total rejected ballots		286	1.21
Turnout		23,725	73.78
Electors on the lists		32,157	–

1944 Quebec general election
Party	Candidate	Votes	%
Liberal	Dowina-Évariste Joyal	6,638	42.25
Union Nationale	Hortensius Béïque	5,528	35.18
Bloc populaire	Émile Loranger	2,140	13.62
Co-operative Commonwealth	Joseph-Uldéric Gauthier	1,406	8.95
Total valid votes		15,712	98.37
Total rejected ballots		261	1.63
Turnout		15,973	70.11
Electors on the lists		22,783	–

1939 Quebec general election
Party	Candidate	Votes	%
Liberal	Dowina-Évariste Joyal	3,598	59.93
Union Nationale	Hortensius Béïque	1,995	33.23
Action libérale nationale	Roland Bosquet	209	13.62
Conservative	Joseph Ménard	202	3.36
Total valid votes		6,004	98.96
Total rejected ballots		63	1.04
Turnout		6,067	76.16
Electors on the lists		7,966	–

1936 Quebec general election
Party	Candidate	Votes	%
Union Nationale	Hortensius Béïque	3,452	58.39
Liberal	Alexandre Thurber	2,460	41.61
Total valid votes		5,912	98.35
Total rejected ballots		99	1.65
Turnout		6,011	76.86
Electors on the lists		7,821	–

1935 Quebec general election
Party	Candidate	Votes	%
Liberal	Alexandre Thurber	3,023	54.95
Conservative	Hortensius Béïque	2,478	45.05
Total valid votes		5,501	99.03
Total rejected ballots		54	0.97
Turnout		5,555	71.87
Electors on the lists		7,729	–

1931 Quebec general election
Party	Candidate	Votes	%
Conservative	Hortensius Béïque	2,834	55.72
Liberal	Victor-Albert Delage	2,252	44.28
Total valid votes		5,086	99.08
Total rejected ballots		47	0.92
Turnout		5,133	73.15
Electors on the lists		7,017	–

1927 Quebec general election
Party	Candidate	Votes	%
Liberal	Alexandre Thurber	2,076	57.05
Conservative	Joseph-Ignace Lamarre	1,563	42.95
Total valid votes		3,639	99.67
Total rejected ballots		12	0.33
Turnout		3,651	56.93
Electors on the lists		6,413	–

1923 Quebec general election
Party	Candidate	Votes	%
Liberal	Alexandre Thurber	2,165	77.07
Independent Liberal	Joseph-Ulric-Arthur Geoffrion	434	15.45
Liberal	Émilien-Joseph Brosseau	210	7.48
Total valid votes		2,809	98.67
Total rejected ballots		38	1.33
Turnout		2,847	51.34
Electors on the lists		5,545	–

1919 Quebec general election
Party	Candidate	Votes
Liberal	Eugène Merril Lesieur Desaulniers	Acclaimed
Electors on the lists		4,775

1916 Quebec general election
Party	Candidate	Votes
Liberal	Eugène Merril Lesieur Desaulniers	Acclaimed
Electors on the lists		4,602

1912 Quebec general election
Party	Candidate	Votes	%
Liberal	Eugène Merril Lesieur Desaulniers	1,783	57.57
Conservative	Louis-Théophile Maréchal	1,314	42.43
Total valid votes		3,097	98.88
Total rejected ballots		35	1.12
Turnout		3,132	66.79
Electors on the lists		4,689	–

Quebec provincial by-election, 1909
Party	Candidate	Votes	%
Liberal	Eugène Merril Lesieur Desaulniers	1,448	62.39
Ligue nationaliste	Tancrède Marsil	873	37.61
Total valid votes		2,321	99.06
Total rejected ballots		22	0.94
Turnout		2,343	58.87
Electors on the lists		3,980	–

1908 Quebec general election
Party	Candidate	Votes	%
Liberal	Maurice Perrault	1,431	55.17
Conservative	Joseph-Ignace Lamarre	1,163	44.83
Total valid votes		2,594	98.22
Total rejected ballots		47	1.78
Turnout		2,641	67.56
Electors on the lists		3,909	–

1904 Quebec general election
Party	Candidate	Votes	%
Liberal	Maurice Perrault	1,324	66.60
Conservative	P.-Élie Sainte-Marie	664	33.40
Total valid votes		1,988	99.70
Total rejected ballots		6	0.30
Turnout		1,994	52.81
Electors on the lists		3,776	–

1900 Quebec general election
Party	Candidate	Votes
Liberal	Maurice Perrault	Acclaimed
Electors on the lists		3,408

1897 Quebec general election
Party	Candidate	Votes	%
Liberal	Antoine Rocheleau	1,280	54.96
Independent	Louis-Édouard Morin	1,049	45.04
Total valid votes		2,329	98.94
Total rejected ballots		25	1.06
Turnout		2,354	70.02
Electors on the lists		3,362	–

Quebec provincial by-election, 1892
Party	Candidate	Votes
Conservative	Louis-Olivier Taillon	Acclaimed

1892 Quebec general election
Party	Candidate	Votes	%
Conservative	Louis-Olivier Taillon	1,246	53.52
Liberal	Antoine Rocheleau	1,082	46.48
Total valid votes		2,328	99.15
Total rejected ballots		20	0.85
Turnout		2,348	79.92
Electors on the lists		2,938	–

1890 Quebec general election
Party	Candidate	Votes	%
Liberal	Antoine Rocheleau	1,046	52.12
Conservative	Pierre-Brazile Lamarre	961	47.88
Total valid votes		2,007	97.24
Total rejected ballots		57	2.76
Turnout		2,064	75.19
Electors on the lists		2,745	–

1886 Quebec general election
Party	Candidate	Votes	%
Liberal	Antoine Rocheleau	892	51.44
Conservative	Michel-Dosithée-Stanislas Martel	842	48.56
Total valid votes		1,734	98.41
Total rejected ballots		28	1.59
Turnout		1,762	74.47
Electors on the lists		2,366	–

1886 Quebec general election
Party	Candidate	Votes	%
Liberal	Antoine Rocheleau	892	51.44
Conservative	Michel-Dosithée-Stanislas Martel	842	48.56
Total valid votes		1,734	98.41
Total rejected ballots		28	1.59
Turnout		1,762	74.47
Electors on the lists		2,366	–

1881 Quebec general election
Party	Candidate	Votes	%
Conservative	Michel-Dosithée-Stanislas Martel	780	53.76
Liberal	Raymond Préfontaine	671	46.24
Total valid votes		1,451	97.32
Total rejected ballots		40	2.68
Turnout		1,491	70.23
Electors on the lists		2,123	–

Quebec provincial by-election, 1879
Party	Candidate	Votes	%
Liberal	Raymond Préfontaine	889	51.78
Conservative	Michel-Dosithée-Stanislas Martel	828	53.76
Total valid votes		1,717	100.00
Turnout		1,717	78.08
Electors on the lists		2,199	–

1878 Quebec general election
Party	Candidate	Votes	%
Conservative	Michel-Dosithée-Stanislas Martel	823	50.18
Liberal	Raymond Préfontaine	817	49.82
Total valid votes		1,640	99.70
Total rejected ballots		5	0.30
Turnout		1,645	72.34
Electors on the lists		2,274	–

1875 Quebec general election
Party	Candidate	Votes	%
Liberal	Raymond Préfontaine	825	51.05
Conservative	Timothée Sauriol	791	48.95
Total valid votes		1,616	99.57
Total rejected ballots		7	0.43
Turnout		1,623	72.42
Electors on the lists		2,241	–

1871 Quebec general election
Party	Candidate	Votes	%
Liberal	Gédéon Larocque	686	58.43
Conservative	Pierre-Bazile Benoît	488	41.57
Total valid votes		1,174	100.00
Turnout		1,174	68.30
Electors on the lists		1,719	–

1867 Quebec general election
Party	Candidate	Votes	%
Conservative	Jean-Baptiste Jodoin	676	56.05
Liberal	François David	530	43.95
Total valid votes		1,206	100.00
Turnout		1,206	68.72
Electors on the lists		1,755	–

== See also ==
- List of Quebec provincial electoral districts
- Canadian provincial electoral districts
