= Diane Legault =

Canadian politician and dentist

Member of the National Assembly of Quebec for Chambly
- In office 2003 – November 15, 2006
- Preceded by: Louise Beaudoin
- Succeeded by: Richard Merlini

Personal details
- Born: July 21, 1956 (age 68); Montreal, Quebec, Canada
- Political party: Liberal
- Education: Université de Montréal (DMD); Université de Sherbrooke (MBA)

Diane Legault (born July 21, 1956) is a Quebec dentist and politician.

== Early life and education ==
Born in Montreal, Quebec, Legault received a Doctor in Dentistry from Université de Montréal in 1979 and a M.B.A. from Université de Sherbrooke in 1995.

== Career ==
Legault was director of professional services for the Ordre des dentistes from 1996 to 1998 and executive director and secretary from 1998 to 2003.

Legault served as the member of the National Assembly for Chambly in Quebec. She represented the Quebec Liberal Party and resigned on November 15, 2006. On November 7, 2006, she was elected president of the Ordre des dentistes du Québec, the professional order representing all the dentists in Quebec, for a five-year term. She was the first woman to hold this position.
