= Stéphane Le Bouyonnec =

Canadian politician

MNA for La Prairie
- In office 2012–2014
- Preceded by: François Rebello
- Succeeded by: Richard Merlini

Personal details
- Born: 26 June 1962 (age 64) Falaise, France
- Party: Coalition Avenir Québec

Stéphane Le Bouyonnec (born 26 June 1962) is a Canadian politician. He was member of the National Assembly of Quebec for the riding of La Prairie, first elected in the 2012 election.

His narrow victory over Parti Québécois candidate Pierre Langlois was subject to a judicial recount, which confirmed Le Bouyonnec's victory on 14 September.

In the 2014 election, he was defeated by Liberal Richard Merlini.

On 1 Nov. 2014, he was elected President of the Coalition Avenir Québec, succeeding Maud Cohen. He resigned from the post on 28 August 2018.
