= Denis Lazure =

Canadian politician

- Born: October 12, 1925; Napierville, Quebec
- Died: February 23, 2008 (aged 82)
- Occupations: psychiatrist and politician

Denis Lazure (October 12, 1925 – February 23, 2008) was a Canadian psychiatrist and politician. Lazure was a Member of the National Assembly of Quebec (MNA) from 1976 to 1984 and from 1989 to 1996. He is the father of actress Gabrielle Lazure.

== Background ==
Lazure was born on October 12, 1925, in Napierville, Quebec. Lazure attended Université de Montréal and was a doctorate in medicine. He also attended the University of Pennsylvania in psychiatry as well as the University of Toronto in which he was bachelor in hospital administration.

Lazure was the founder of the infant psychiatry department of Saint-Justine Hospital in 1957. He was also the director of this hospital as well as those of Riviere-des-Prairies and Louis-Hippolyte Lafontaine all in the Montreal region. He would later be the director in 1974 of the first psychiatric hospital in Haiti. He was also a teacher at Université de Montréal and was the President of the Canadian Association of Psychiatrists.

== Federal politics ==
Before being a Quebec MNA, Lazure ran twice for a seat in the House of Commons of Canada as a candidate for the New Democratic Party. He finished second in a by-election in the district of Outremont—Saint-Jean in 1967 and finished third in the district of Gamelin in the 1968 federal election.

== Member of the National Assembly ==
He was first elected to the Quebec provincial legislature in the Chambly riding as a member of the Parti Québécois in the 1976 elections and was re-elected in 1981 in Bertrand. During his first mandate he was appointed to the Cabinet by René Lévesque. Lazure served as Minister of Social Affairs and, after his re-election, as State Minister of Social Development.

During the Parti Québécois Crisis of 1984, Lazure, who is identified with the purs et durs faction of his party, resigned from the Cabinet and from the legislature. He eventually supported the return of Jacques Parizeau as party leader.

== Political comeback ==
He would become a psychiatrist at the Greenfield hospital until he ran again in 1989, where he was elected in La Prairie. He was re-elected in 1994 but resigned in 1996. He returned to his professional career after. His work contribution was rewarded with an award given by the Psychiatric Doctors Association of Quebec in 2004.

== Death ==
Lazure died on February 23, 2008.

== See also ==
- Parti Québécois Crisis, 1984

National Assembly of Quebec
| Preceded by Guy Saint-Pierre (Liberal) | MNA, District of Chambly; 1976–1981 | Succeeded by Luc Tremblay (Parti Québécois) |
| Preceded by District created in 1980 | MNA, District of Bertrand; 1981–1984 | Succeeded by Robert Bourassa (Liberal) |
| Preceded by Jean-Pierre Saintonge (Liberal) | MNA, District of La Prairie; 1989–1996 | Succeeded by Monique Simard (Parti Québécois) |
