= Julie Guyot =

Canadian politician

Julie Guyot MNA
- Julie Guyot, September 2026

Member of the Quebec Legislative Assembly for Chambly
- Incumbent
- Assumed office October 5, 2026
- Preceded by: Jean-François Roberge

Personal details
- Party: Parti Québécois

Julie Guyot MNA is a Canadian politician who has served as a member of the National Assembly of Quebec representing the electoral district of Chambly since 2026. She is a member of the Parti Québécois.

Guyot was a history professor at Cégep Édouard-Montpetit and authored numerous essays concerning the comparative history of Quebec and Ireland.
