= Hortensius Béïque =

Canadian politician

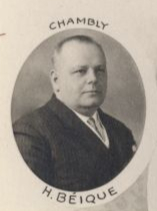

Member of the Legislative Assembly of Quebec for Chambly
- In office 1931–1935
- Preceded by: Alexandre Thurber
- Succeeded by: Alexandre Thurber
- In office 1936–1939
- Preceded by: Alexandre Thurber
- Succeeded by: Dowina-Évariste Joyal

Personal details
- Born: September 29, 1889 Marieville, Quebec
- Died: August 15, 1951 (aged 61) Chambly-Bassin, Quebec
- Party: Union Nationale

Hortensius Béïque (September 29, 1889 – August 15, 1951) was a Canadian politician from Quebec.

== Background ==
He was born on September 29, 1889, in Marieville and was a stock broker.

== Federal Politics ==
Béïque unsuccessfully ran as a Conservative candidate for the district Chambly—Verchères in 1926.

== Mayor ==
He served as Mayor of Chambly-Bassin, Quebec, from 1930 to 1945.

== Member of the legislature ==
Béïque ran as a Conservative candidate in 1931 for the district of Vaudreuil and won. He was defeated against Liberal candidate Alexandre Thurber in 1935.

He made a political comeback and was elected as a Union Nationale candidate in 1936, but lost re-election again in 1939.

He is particularly remembered for a comment he made in the legislative assembly on April 2, 1935, when he said, "The roads are as crooked as the government." When required to retract this unparliamentary statement, he corrected himself, saying, "I will say that the roads are not as crooked as the government."

== Death ==
Béïque died on August 15, 1951.
