= Gérard Latulippe =

Canadian diplomat

High Commissioner of Canada to Trinidad and Tobago
- In office 2013–2018
- Preceded by: Karen McDonald
- Succeeded by: Carla Hogan Rufelds

MNA for Chambly
- In office 1985–1989
- Preceded by: Luc Tremblay
- Succeeded by: Lucienne Robillard

Solicitor General of Quebec
- In office 1985–1989
- Preceded by: Marc-André Bédard
- Succeeded by: Herbert Marx

Personal details
- Born: November 5, 1944 (age 81) Montreal, Quebec
- Party: Quebec Liberal Party
- Profession: lawyer

Gérard Latulippe (born November 5, 1944) is a Canadian diplomat and former politician, who served as Canada's high commissioner to Trinidad and Tobago from 2013 to 2018.

== Biography ==
Born in Montreal, he studied economics at Sir George Williams University and law at the Université de Montréal and the University of Ottawa. He worked as a lawyer.

He first ran for election to the National Assembly of Quebec in the 1981 election, as a Quebec Liberal Party candidate in Rosemont. Unsuccessful in that election, he ran in Chambly in the 1985 election, and was elected that year. He served in the cabinet of premier Robert Bourassa from 1985 to 1987 as solicitor general.

He did not run for reelection to the legislature in the 1989 provincial election, but was appointed as Quebec's provincial delegate general to Mexico. He served in that role until 1994, when he was appointed as the provincial delegate general in Brussels. His work as delegate in Mexico left mixed memories. A major Mexican newspaper published an article accusing him of having put a brake on cultural relations between Quebec and Mexico. A former employee said that there was a tense atmosphere, observing that Gérard Latulippe was "unpredictable" and sometimes got carried away in epic anger.

He ran as a Canadian Alliance candidate in the riding of Charlesbourg—Jacques-Cartier in the 2000 federal election, but was not elected. He also served as Quebec lieutenant to Canadian Alliance leader Stockwell Day.

He subsequently worked for the National Democratic Institute for International Affairs on international development projects, including in Haiti, Morocco, Iraq, Georgia and the Democratic Republic of the Congo.

In 2010 he was named as head of the Canadian human rights organization Rights and Democracy, holding this role until the organization was dissolved in 2012. He was then named to his current post as high commissioner to Trinidad and Tobago.
