= Jacques Finet =

Jacques Finet is a former politician in the Canadian province of Quebec. He served as mayor of Longueuil from 1982 to 1987 as leader of the Parti municipal de Longueuil.

== Early life and city councillor ==
Jacques Finet worked for Hydro-Québec prior to his election as Longueuil's mayor. He was first elected to the Longueuil City Council as a city councillor in the 1978 municipal election, representing the city's tenth ward. The overall result of this election was inconclusive: Marcel Robidas of the rival Parti civique de Longueuil was re-elected as mayor, but the Parti municipal won nine of seventeen seats and held a functioning majority until one of its representatives was expelled from the party. Parti municipal leader Paul Viau resigned in 1981, and Jacques Finet was chosen without opposition to become his successor.

== Mayor ==
Finet defeated Robidas by the narrow margin of eighty-two votes in the 1982 municipal election to become mayor of Longueuil, and the Parti municipal won a convincing majority on council.

As mayor, Finet promoted a cleanup plan for the Saint Lawrence River and a related beautification project for Longueuil's waterfront. The original project proposal would have involved constructing a sewage interceptor pipe on the river's bed for three kilometers, and for this reason the plan was opposed by local environmental groups. The plan was rejected by the government of Quebec in late 1985, and Finet instead accepted a compromise to construct most of the pipe under Quebec Route 132. The waterfront beautification project began in September 1986.

In March 1985, Finet signed a land-swap agreement with Pratt & Whitney Canada, a major employer in the region with which the city had previously had difficult relations. The new municipal lands were intended for housing development. Later in the same year, Finet ordered ten emergency dispatchers in Longueuil to take lessons in English, to ensure that the city would be able to provide emergency services in French and English at all hours.

Finet was chosen as chair of the Montreal South Shore Transit Corp. in December 1985. He indicated that his priorities would be improving access to the Longueuil Metro Station and introducing a shuttle bus service for commuters to Montreal via the Champlain Bridge. The following year, he helped negotiate a settlement that ended a thirty-five-day strike among drivers.

Finet introduced a cleanup program for Longueuil's Chambly Road in March 1986, as based on a previous effort on St-Charles Street. A five-million dollar refurbishing plan for the street was announced in July of the same year.

Finet was easily re-elected as mayor in the 1986 municipal election, and the Parti municipal won all nineteen seats on council. Finet was confirmed to a second term as chair of the Montreal South Shore Transit Corp. shortly thereafter.

== Hydro-Québec executive ==
Finet unexpectedly resigned as mayor on April 16, 1987, to accept a position with Hydro-Québec as executive vice-president for Quebec sales. He explained that he always planned to return to the company at some point, and that the job offer was a unique opportunity. Some criticized him for leaving politics so soon after his re-election. Finet launched an energy reduction campaign in April 1991, highlighted by a call for Hydro-Québec users to use energy-saving light bulbs, shower heads, and hot-water heaters.

In August 1991, Finet was appointed as Hydro-Québec's first vice-president for Europe. He indicated that his priority would be to foster a "high-quality image" for the corporation while fighting what he described as a "smear campaign" from environmental and indigenous groups over its involvement in the proposed Great Whale River project. His office was located in Brussels, Belgium.

Shortly after his appointment, Finet defended Hydro-Québec's relations with Cree and Inuit communities affected by construction projects in northern Quebec. He argued that the corporation had paid $500 million in compensation for mining rights and that economic conditions and social services were improving in the affected communities. Critics charged that the construction projects created new health risks and contributed to a variety of social problems.

Finet asked the International Water Tribunal to cancel a series of planned hearings on the Great Whale River project in 1992, charging that the hearings would become a media circus. Bill Namagoose, executive director of the Grand Council of the Crees, which requested the hearings, described Finet's request as spurious. Shortly thereafter, Finet charged that the Grand Council of Crees was using environmental arguments as a "facade" to push for full control of natural resources. Namagoose again dismissed Finet's statement, saying that the Cree were seeking shared control of natural resources in accordance with the James Bay and Northern Quebec Agreement. The International Water Tribunal ultimately issued a non-binding ruling calling for the Great Whale project to be halted pending completion of an environmental review.

Finet was chosen as leader of the International Union for Electroheat (UIE) at the 12th World Congress on Electrotechnologies in June 1992. He was the first North American to lead the organization.

Hydro-Québec wrapped up most of its European public relations activities in 1993, and Finet announced his retirement from Hydro-Québec at the same time. In an interview with the Montreal Gazette, he said that Hydro had built up a network of supporters in Europe and that his presence was no longer needed. At its peak in 1992, Hydro-Québec's European office spent $920,000 on public relations.

== Attempted return to political life ==
Finet sought to return as mayor of Longueuil in the 1994 municipal election as a candidate of the newly formed Alliance de Longueuil, which was created by a de facto merger of the Alliance démocratique de Longueuil and the Parti civique de Longueuil. He won the party leadership on May 1, 1994, defeating former Parti civique leader Sylvie Robidas by 601 votes to 122. His platform called for a municipal tax freeze, the creation of an economic development office, establishing an arts and cultural center to serve the South Shore, and quality-of-life committees for all the city's neighbourhoods. He also said that he would seek a merger of the Montreal Island, South Shore, and Laval transit systems, to be accompanied by a distance-based fare system. His opponents revived criticisms that he had resigned as mayor too soon after his re-election in 1986. Finet ultimately finished third against Claude Gladu of the Parti municipal.

Finet stepped down as leader of the Alliance de Longueuil in November 1995. He has not sought a return to political life since this time.

== Electoral record ==
1994 Longueuil municipal election: Mayor of Longueuil
Party	Candidate	Votes	%
Parti municipal de Longueuil	Claude Gladu	19,223	40.74
Parti Longueuillois	Gisèle Hamelin	14,041	29.76
Alliance de Longueuil	Jacques Finet	13,921	29.50
Total valid votes		47,185	100
Source: Le Parti municipal de Longueuil: Roger Ferland, le gestionnaire, Société historique et culturelle du Marigot, accessed 27 February 2014.

1986 Longueuil municipal election: Mayor of Longueuil
Party	Candidate	Votes	%
Parti municipal de Longueuil	Jacques Finet (incumbent)	28,675	80.96
Parti civique de Longueuil	Claude Jollet	6,744	19.04
Total valid votes		35,419	100
Source: Le Parti municipal de Longueuil: Jacques Finet, l'innovateur, Société historique et culturelle du Marigot, accessed 19 February 2014.

1982 Longueuil municipal election: Mayor of Longueuil
Party	Candidate	Votes	%
Parti municipal de Longueuil	Jacques Finet	19,157	48.74
Parti civique de Longueuil	Marcel Robidas (incumbent)	19,075	48.54
Independent	Jacques Gendron	1,069	2.72
Total valid votes		39,301	100
Source: Le Parti municipal de Longueuil: Le premier mandat 1978 - 1982, Société historique et culturelle du Marigot, accessed 22 January 2014.

1978 Longueuil municipal election: Councillor, Ward Ten
Party	Candidate	Votes	%
Parti municipal de Longueuil	Jacques Finet	996	49.26
Parti civique de Longueuil	André Meunier	871	43.08
Parti de la réforme municipale	Pauline Fleury	155	7.67
Total valid votes		2,022	100
Source: Le Parti municipal de Longueuil: Le premier mandat 1978 - 1982, Société historique et culturelle du Marigot, accessed 10 January 2014.
