= Pierre Davignon =

Pierre Alexis Davignon

3rd Mayor of Longueuil
- In office 1853–1861
- Preceded by: Charles Sabourin
- Succeeded by: André Trudeau

Member of the Legislative Assembly of the Province of Canada for Rouville
- In office 1848–1851
- Preceded by: Timothée Franchère
- Succeeded by: Joseph-Napoléon Poulin

Personal details
- Born: 1810
- Died: October 7, 1878 (aged 67–68) Longueuil, Quebec
- Party: Parti Patriote
- Spouse: Euphémie Soupras

Pierre Alexis Davignon (1810 – October 7, 1878) was a medical doctor and political figure in Canada East. He represented Rouville in the Legislative Assembly of the Province of Canada from 1848 to 1851.

Davignon studied medicine and was licensed to practise in 1832. He was named commissioner for the Tribunal for Minor Causes in 1836. Davignon married Euphémie Soupras. He did not run for reelection to the assembly in 1851. Davignon served as mayor of Longueuil from 1853 to 1861. He is believed to have died there in 1878.

His grandson Alexandre Thurber later served in the assembly.
