= Jean Cournoyer =

Canadian politician

Member of the National Assembly of Quebec for Saint-Jacques
- In office 1969–1970
- Preceded by: Paul Dozois
- Succeeded by: Claude Charron

Member of the National Assembly of Quebec for Chambly
- In office 1971–1973
- Preceded by: Pierre Laporte
- Succeeded by: Guy Saint-Pierre

Member of the National Assembly of Quebec for Robert-Baldwin
- In office 1973–1976
- Preceded by: Arthur-Ewen Séguin
- Succeeded by: John O'Gallagher

Personal details
- Born: March 16, 1934 (age 92) Sorel, Quebec
- Party: Union Nationale; Liberal

Jean Cournoyer (born March 16, 1934) is a retired Quebec politician. He was a Member of the provincial legislature in Quebec.

== Member of the legislature ==
Born in Sorel, Quebec, Cournoyer successfully ran as a Union Nationale candidate in the district of Saint-Jacques in a 1969 by-election, but was defeated by Parti Québécois candidate Claude Charron in 1970.

== Member of the Cabinet ==
After the death of Cabinet Member Pierre Laporte in 1970, Premier Robert Bourassa appointed Cournoyer to succeed him.

Cournoyer served as Minister of Labour from 1970 to 1975 and Minister of Natural Resources from 1975 to 1976. He won a by-election as a Liberal in the district of Chambly in 1971.

He was re-elected in Robert-Baldwin in 1973, but was defeated in Richelieu in 1976.

He served as mayor of Dollard-des-Ormeaux from 1978 to 1982.

== Retirement from Politics ==
After Cournoyer retired from political life, he started a career on TV and the radio. He has co-hosted several TV shows with Matthias Rioux, who was the Parti Québécois MNA for Matane from 1994 to 2003.
