= Jean-Baptiste Jodoin =

Canadian politician

Member of the Legislative Assembly of Quebec for Chambly
- In office 1867–1871
- Succeeded by: Gédéon Larocque

Personal details
- Born: July 14, 1809 Boucherville, Lower Canada
- Died: January 14, 1884 (aged 74) Montreal, Quebec
- Party: Conservative

Jean-Baptiste Jodoin (July 14, 1809 – January 14, 1884) was a farmer and political figure in Quebec. He represented Chambly in the Legislative Assembly of Quebec from 1867 to 1871 as a Conservative.

He was born in Boucherville, Lower Canada, the son of Jean-Baptiste Jodoin and Céleste Quintal. Jodoin was married twice: to Gilette Viau in 1830 and to Marie-Louise Jodoin in 1866. He was mayor from 1862 to 1868. Jodoin died in Montreal at the age of 74.
