= Richard Merlini =

Canadian politician (born 1965)

Member of the National Assembly of Quebec for La Prairie
- In office April 7, 2014 – October 1, 2018
- Preceded by: Stéphane Le Bouyonnec
- Succeeded by: Christian Dubé

Member of the National Assembly of Quebec for Chambly
- In office March 26, 2007 – December 8, 2008
- Preceded by: Diane Legault
- Succeeded by: Bertrand St-Arnaud

Personal details
- Born: January 27, 1965 (age 61) Montreal, Quebec
- Party: Action démocratique du Québec (2007-2008); Quebec Liberal Party (2014-present)
- Spouse: Lisa Hodgson

Richard Merlini (born January 27, 1965, in Montreal, Quebec) is a politician from Quebec, Canada. He was an Action démocratique du Québec member of the National Assembly for the electoral district of Chambly from 2007 to 2008.

Merlini holds a bachelor's degree in political science and history from Concordia University. Merlini worked for Premcor Ltee, a commercial printing company in Saint-Lambert as a clerk, a board member and the vice-president (production sector) for 26 years.

Merlini was also a candidate in Saint-Lambert in the 1990 municipal elections and in La Prairie in 2003. He was also involved with the Montreal South Shore Chamber of Commerce and the business association of La Prairie. He also coached a local soccer team in La Prairie since 2001.

Until 2003, he was a Liberal supporter. In 2006, he was named the vice-president of the ADQ.

Merlini was first elected in the 2007 election with 39% of the vote. Parti Québécois candidate Bertrand St-Arnaud finished second with 29% of the vote. Merlini took office on April 12, 2007, and was named the critic for energy affairs.
