= Antoine Rocheleau =

Canadian politician and farmer

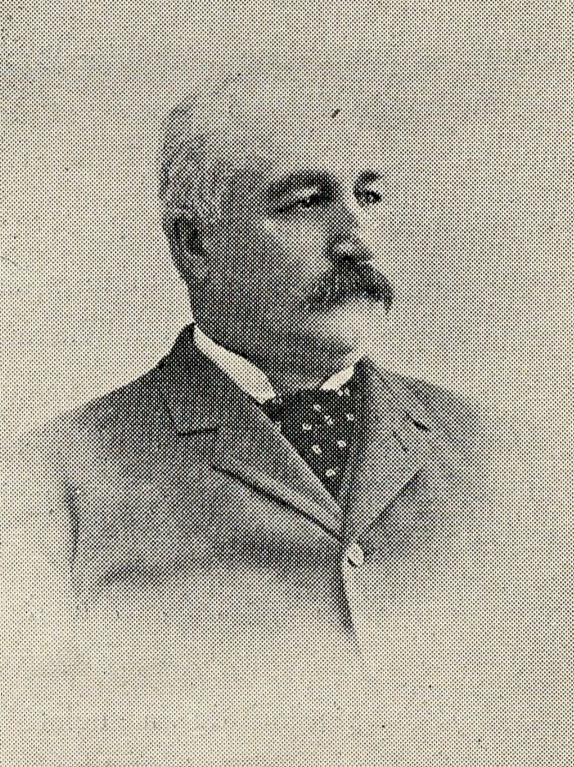
A. Rocheleau, deputy of Chambly

Antoine Rocheleau (French pronunciation: [ɑ̃twan ʁɔʃlo]; October 4, 1836 – April 28, 1901) was a farmer and political figure in Quebec. He represented Chambly in the Legislative Assembly of Quebec from 1886 to 1892 and from 1897 to 1900 as a Liberal.

He was born in Chambly, Lower Canada, the son of Antoine Rocheleau and Françoise Brais, dit Labonté, and was educated at the Collège de Chambly. Rocheleau's farm was located at Saint-Hubert. He was defeated when he ran for reelection in 1892. Rocheleau was married twice: to Onésime Sainte-Marie in 1856 and to Alphonsine Morin in 1895. He died in Saint-Hubert at the age of 64.
