= Chambly County, Quebec =

Former county in Quebec, Canada

Coordinates: 45.521°N 73.450°W

Chambly County was a county of Quebec that existed between 1855 and the early 1980s. The territory of the county today forms part of the Montérégie administrative region and the Urban agglomeration of Longueuil and the Regional county municipality of la Vallée-du-Richelieu. The county seat was Longueuil.

== Municipalities situated within the county ==
- Boucherville
- Carignan (formerly Saint-Joseph-de-Chambly)
- Chambly
- Greenfield Park (merged into Longueuil)
- Ville Jacques-Cartier (merged into Longueuil)
- LeMoyne (merged into Longueuil)
- Longueuil
- Montréal-Sud (merged into Longueuil)
- Saint-Bruno-de-Montarville
- Saint-Hubert (merged into Longueuil)
- Saint-Lambert

== See also ==
- List of Quebec counties
