= Marcel Robidas =

Canadian politician (1923–2009)

Marcel Robidas (November 4, 1923 – May 17, 2009) was a politician in the Canadian province of Quebec. Best known for serving as mayor of Longueuil from 1966 to 1982, Robidas was also a prominent supporter of Quebec sovereignty.

== Early life and military career ==
Robidas was born to a working class family in Montreal. When he was twelve years old, his father died of cancer; as the eldest son in his family, he was required to take over the running of a billiards room that his father had purchased shortly before his death. Robidas joined Les Fusiliers Mont-Royal during World War II and saw action as an infantryman in Belgium, France, and Germany. He met his wife Renée Lacour while overseas; the couple had fourteen children, twelve of whom were still alive at the time of his death. In 1947, he received a bachelor's degree from the Université de Montréal in social sciences, economics, and political science.

== Municipal politician ==
Robidas was first elected to the Longueuil City Council in 1961 and served as mayor from 1966 to 1982. A vocal proponent of amalgamation with neighbouring municipalities, he negotiated the merger of Longueuil with Jacques-Cartier, a boomtown that was five times as large and twice as populous as Longueuil, in 1969. He later founded an organization called Société pour le progrès de la Rive-Sud to promote further mergers, though provincial restrictions ultimately prevented the organization from being successful. In 2001, he supported the province's creation of a new amalgamated city centred around Longueuil that included seven neighbouring municipalities.

Robidas proposed the "twinning" of francophone and anglophone municipalities across Canada in the late 1960s, as a means of fostering better relations between the communities during an increasingly tense period. He himself established an exchange program with Whitby, Ontario, involving visits and cultural exchanges between the two communities, after a group of Whitby scouts canoed to Montreal's Expo 67 event.

In 1981, Robidas spoke against a suggestion by Montreal politician Yvon Lamarre that the Quebec government restrict municipalities from approving new shopping centres on the grounds that such retail stores would lead to the deterioration of urban cores. Robidas was quoted as saying, "I daresay the rest of the other towns [i.e., outside of Montreal and Quebec City wouldn't agree to give up such rights. If the province can tell us today no shopping centres, it might be tomorrow no industrial parks. We'll protect those the way we would our eyes."

Robidas was unexpectedly defeated by Jacques Finet by only eighty-two votes in the 1982 Longueuil municipal election. Following his defeat, he accepted an appointment by the Quebec government to the Commission municipale du Québec. In 1985, he endorsed a proposal by his former rival Finet to fill three kilometres of shoreline to create a waterfront park. The original plan was opposed by environmental groups and ultimately rejected by the provincial government, though a modified version of the proposal was accepted the following year.

Robidas launched a new political party called the Mouvement des Citoyens to contest the 2001 Longueuil municipal election. The party, under a different name, ultimately ran Marguerite Pearson Richard as its mayoral candidate; she was defeated by Jacques Olivier.

In 2008, the city of Longueuil named the Vieux-Longueuil city hall borough as the Marcel-Robidas building.

== Federal and provincial politics ==
Robidas contested the 1972 Canadian federal election as a Progressive Conservative candidate in the Longueuil riding. He finished third against Liberal candidate Jacques Olivier. Robidas later declared his support for Quebec sovereignty; he was the first mayor of a major city in Quebec to support the Parti Québécois and openly supported the Oui side in the 1980 Quebec referendum.

In 1995, Robidas was appointed by the newly elected Parti Québécois government of Jacques Parizeau to head a regional commission in Montérégie on Quebec sovereignty. Following his appointment, he said that he was eager to include anglophone Quebecers in the commission's activities. Perhaps unexpectedly, the commission's final report did not openly endorse sovereignty, due to divisions among its members. Robidas later co-chaired the Oui campaign in the Montérégie region in the 1995 Quebec referendum.

Robidas took part in a World War II memorial event organized by the Parti Québécois in 1999. The event organizers described the ceremony as "help[ing] many Quebec veterans feel more at ease as both veterans and sovereigntists," which was sometimes a difficult prospect due to historical French Canadian opposition to conscription. Robidas, who described himself at this time as a Quebec nationalist but not a full-fledged separatist, said the event demonstrated "harmony" among those with different political views. He was quoted as saying, "We fought the war with everyone. We won the war together and we won the liberty to express ourselves freely so everyone can think what they want."

In 2000, he described his views on Quebec sovereignty in the following terms: "Since I was a student of social and political sciences at Université de Montréal, I realized the central government had taken over provincial areas of jurisdictions, as defined by the British North America Act. I decided then we had to work with all our strength to establish a balance in Canada."

== Electoral record ==
Federal

1972 Canadian federal election: Longueuil
Party	Candidate	Votes	%	±%
Liberal	Jacques Olivier	22,129	44.62	
Social Credit	Emile-A. Vadeboncoeur	12,091	24.38	
Progressive Conservative	Marcel Robidas	7,015	14.14	
New Democratic	Robert Mansour	4,548	9.17	
Independent	Jacques Gendron	2,020	4.07	
Non-Affiliated	Raôul Wéziwézô Duguay	1,625	3.28	
Marxist–Leninist	André Pesant	170	0.34	
Total valid votes		49,598	100.00	
Total rejected ballots		2,977		
Turnout		52,575	72.56	
Electors on the lists		72,458		
Source: Official Voting Results, Office of the Chief Electoral Officer (Canada), 1972.

Municipal (incomplete)

1982 Longueuil municipal election: Mayor of Longueuil
Party	Candidate	Votes	%
Parti municipal de Longueuil	Jacques Finet	19,157	48.74
Parti civique de Longueuil	Marcel Robidas (incumbent)	19,075	48.54
Independent	Jacques Gendron	1,069	2.72
Total valid votes		39,301	100
Source: Le Parti municipal de Longueuil: Le premier mandat 1978 - 1982, Société historique et culturelle du Marigot, accessed 22 January 2014.
