= Bertrand St-Arnaud =

Canadian politician (born 1958)

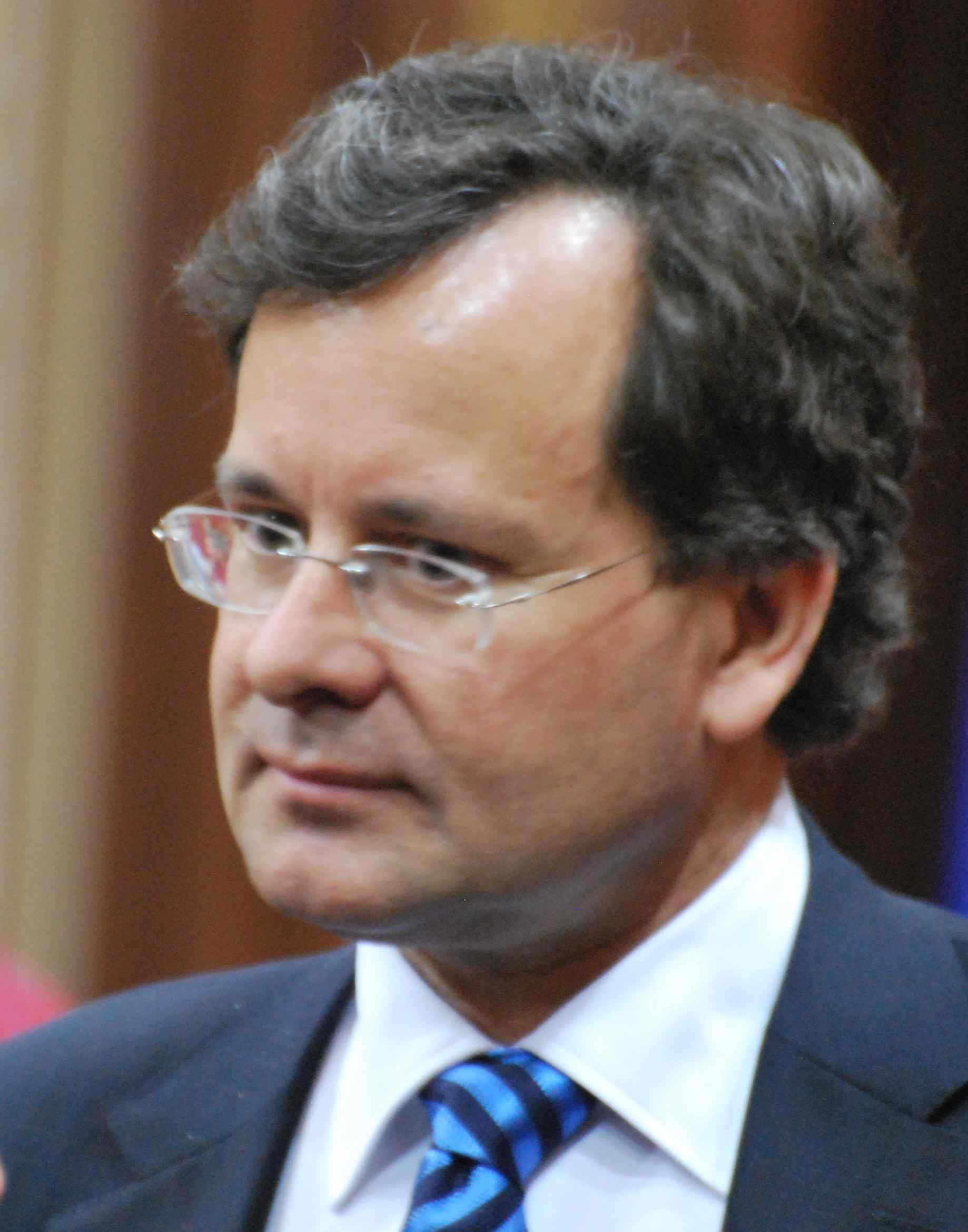
- Bertrand St-Arnaud at the National Order of Quebec ceremony in June 2013.

Member of the National Assembly of Quebec for Chambly
- In office 8 December 2008 – 7 April 2014
- Preceded by: Richard Merlini
- Succeeded by: Jean-François Roberge

Personal details
- Born: 13 September 1958 (age 67) Montreal
- Party: Parti Québécois

Bertrand St-Arnaud (born 13 September 1958) is a politician in the Canadian province of Quebec, who was elected to represent the riding of Chambly in the National Assembly of Quebec in the 2008 provincial election. He was defeated in the 2014 Quebec general election by Coalition Avenir Quebec candidate Jean-Francois Roberge. He is a member of the Parti Québécois. St-Arnaud first obtained a license degree in law from the Université de Montréal and later added a master's degree in political sciences from the Université Laval. He also made studies in Europe with a degree from the university of Lund in Sweden. St-Arnaud first obtained a license degree in law from the Université de Montréal and later added a master's degree in political sciences from the Université Laval. He also made studies in Europe with a degree from the university of Lund in Sweden.

He practised law from 1987 to 2000 and in 2005. He was also the press secretary for the Cabinet of the Premier of Quebec in 1985 and would work for the intergovernmental affairs department as well as for the Library of the National Assembly of Quebec and the Cabinet director for the Minister of International Relations from 2000 to 2003.
