= Laflèche, Quebec =

Laflèche
- Neighbourhood
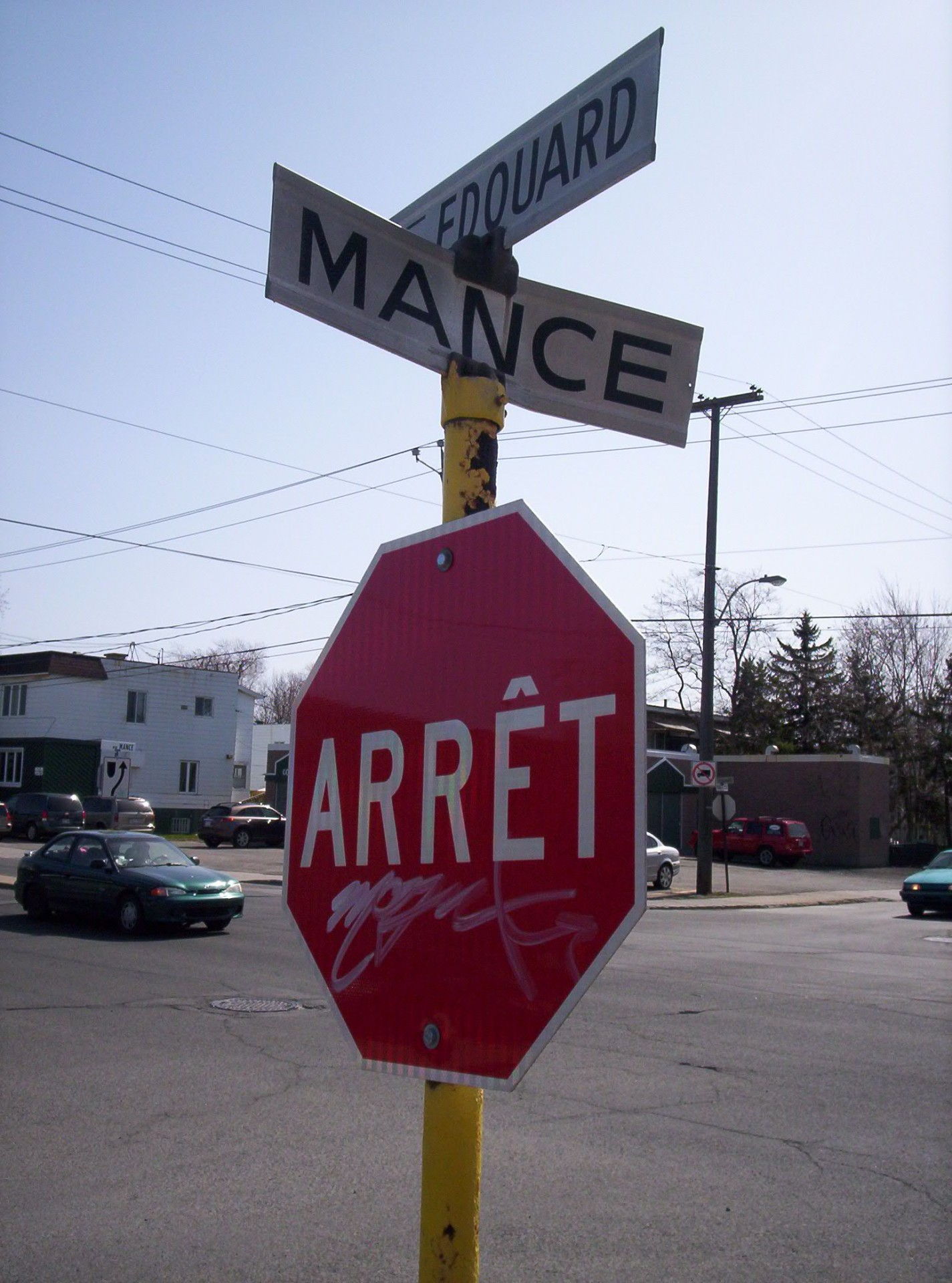
- A typical intersection in Laflèche

- Location within Greater Montreal
- Coordinates: 45.496°N 73.475°W
- Country: Canada
- Province: Quebec
- City: Longueuil
- Borough: Saint-Hubert
- Established: 1947
- Merger with Saint-Hubert: 1971

Government
  - City Councillor: Jacques Lemire (Ind.)

Area
  - Land: 4.33 km^{2} (1.67 sq mi)

Population (2011)
  - Total: 17,499
  - Density: 4,041.3/km^{2} (10,467/sq mi)
  - Change *: 0.0%
  - Dwellings: 7,999
- Time zone: UTC-5 (Eastern (EST))
  - Summer (DST): UTC-4 (EDT)
- Website: www.longueuil.quebec

Laflèche (French pronunciation: [laflɛʃ]; originally known as Mackayville) is a neighbourhood in the Saint-Hubert borough of the city of Longueuil.

== Neighbourhood ==
Laflèche is primarily a densely populated residential neighbourhood. It is largely low-income, and similar to Ville LeMoyne and other parts of the Le Vieux-Longueuil borough. Most buildings in the area are single-family homes, but there are also many small apartment buildings scattered throughout the neighbourhood. Boulevard Taschereau, Boulevard Édouard and Chemin de la Grande Allée are the main arteries in Laflèche, and all three feature numerous businesses.

Laflèche is reputed for its small house built with tar up planks taken from the rail industry. A good proportion of the first inhabitants of the neighbourhood worked at the Canadian National plant in Pointe-Saint-Charles, which made it easier for workers to carry large pieces of wood in Laflèche to build houses.

The oldest house of the neighborhood is on Duke street. It was built at the end of the 19th century.

== History ==
Laflèche is a neighbourhood that was built mostly between 1930 and 1960. During the beginning of the 20th century, the territory was part of the Saint-Antoine de Longueuil Parish. Originally known as St-Lambert Heights, the name of the land was changed to Mackayville in honour of a Montreal notary who managed the development of the land in the 1920s.

With the opening of Jacques-Cartier Bridge in 1930 and the steadily increase of cars, many Montreal working families moved to the South Shore, including Mackayville.

Montreal and Southern Counties Railway had a tram stop in Mackayville at the corner Grande-Allée and Edouard. The building, which eventually became a Perette convenience store, still exists today.

Mackayville became an independent city in 1947 at the same time as neighbouring Ville Jacques-Cartier. Mackayville got its first sewer in 1956.

The city changed its name to Laflèche on March 5, 1959. It later merged with the city of St. Hubert in October 1971, when its population was about 15,000.

Throughout the 1970s, Laflèche was nicknamed petit Saint-Henri de la Rive-Sud (the little Saint-Henri of the South Shore) because its inhabitants were viewed as being rough.

== Demographics ==
In 2001, the district of Laflèche was estimated to have just under 17,000 people. This makes it around the same size as the neighbouring borough of Greenfield Park. The below figures are based on the three census tracts that form Laflèche.

Language
From Canada 2006 Census

Language	Population	Percentage (%)
French	13,560	78.9%
English	1,340	7.8%
Both English and French	160	0.9%
Other languages	2,130	12.4%

== Government ==
The city hall, police station and fire station of Laflèche were located at the corner of Boulevard Grande-Allée and Rue Georges.

=== Mayors ===
Former Mayors of Laflèche
Mayor	Term Began	Term Ended
J. W. Gendron	1947	1949
Lucien Tapin	1949	1953
Édouard Charruau	1953	1957
Paul Provost	1957	1962
Henri Cyr	1962	1963
Alexandre Girard	1963	1965
Gérard Philipps	1965	1971
Absorbed by Saint-Hubert	1971	

== Education ==
The South Shore Protestant Regional School Board previously served the municipality.

== Geographic Location ==
Laflèche is bordered by Boulevard Taschereau to the west, Route 116 to the north, Boulevard Kimber to the east and Rue Soucy to the south.
