= Saint-Hubert, Quebec =

Saint-Hubert
- Borough of Longueuil
- Flag

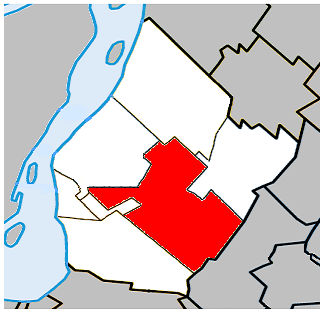
- Location within Urban Agglomeration of Longueuil.

- Location in southern Quebec.
- Coordinates: 45°28′57″N 73°25′11″W
- Country: Canada
- Province: Quebec
- City: Longueuil
- Established: 1860
- Merger with Longueuil: January 1, 2002
- Electoral Districts Federal: Saint-Bruno—Saint-Hubert
- Provincial: Laporte; Vachon

Government
  - Type: Borough
  - Federal MP(s): Denis Trudel
  - Quebec MNA(s): Nicole Ménard (PLQ); Martine Ouellet (PQ)

Area
  - Land: 65.98 km^{2} (25.48 sq mi)

Population (2006)
  - Total: 77,028
  - Density: 1,167.5/km^{2} (3,024/sq mi)
  - Change (2001-06): ▲1.5%
  - Dwellings: 30,284
- Time zone: UTC-5 (EST)
  - Summer (DST): UTC-4 (EDT)
- Postal code(s): J3Y, J3Z, J4T
- Area code: 450
- Access Routes A-30: R-112; R-116
- Website: Webpage

Saint-Hubert (/- ˈhjuːbərt/ - HEW-bərt, French: [sɛ̃t‿ybɛʁ], locally [sẽɪ̯̃t͡s‿ybaɛ̯ʁ]) is a borough in the city of Longueuil, located in the Montérégie region of Quebec, Canada. It had been a separate city prior to January 1, 2002, when it along with several other neighbouring south shore municipalities were merged into Longueuil. Its area is 65.98 km^{2} (25.48 sq mi) which makes it Longueuil's biggest borough by land though Le Vieux-Longueuil has the largest population. The city hall of Longueuil is located in Saint-Hubert. The borough is about 14 kilometres (8.7 mi) from downtown Montreal.

Saint-Hubert has a wide array of commercial, industrial and agricultural enterprises. The aerospace industry is arguably the most important of these enterprises. Pratt & Whitney Canada designs and manufactures jet engines at a plant near Saint-Hubert Airport. The Canadian Space Agency has its head office in Saint-Hubert. The École nationale d'aérotechnique, a school that teaches aeronautics is located in the borough and operated by Collège Édouard-Montpetit.

== History ==
The city's namesake is derived from Hubertus, who later became commonly known as St. Hubert. It was originally established as a parish in 1860, and was granted official city status in 1958.

In 1971, the former city of Laflèche (previously known as Mackayville), merged with the city of Saint-Hubert.

October Crisis

At the height of the 1970 October Crisis, Quebec Labour Minister Pierre Laporte was kidnapped from his Saint-Lambert, Quebec home and held at Saint-Hubert Airport. The city of Saint-Hubert, like many other Quebec municipalities, named a park in his honour, Parc Pierre-Laporte.

Recent history

In 1992, the city began work on the creation of a large park, to be known as Parc de la Cité. It is located in the heart of the city and includes a one-kilometre (1000 yard) long man-made lake. Croydon - Was part of St-Hubert from 0 St-Hubert Rise to Orchard ( St. Andres st) to Grande Allée to Maricourt.

== Politics ==
It is split between the Vachon and Laporte (Laflèche) provincial electoral districts. Vachon's Member of the National Assembly is Martine Ouellet of the Parti Québécois. Laporte's Member of the National Assembly is Nicole Ménard of the Quebec Liberal Party.

It is composed of five municipal districts, each with a city councillor. The borough president is Lorraine Guay-Boivin of Action Longueuil.

Saint-Hubert Borough Council
District	Party	Councillor
Iberville	Action Longueuil	Éric Beaulieu
Laflèche	Independent	Jacques Lemire
Maraîchers	Action Longueuil	Lorraine Guay-Boivin
Parc-de-la-Cité	Action Longueuil	Jacques E. Poitras
Vieux-Saint-Hubert-la Savane	Action Longueuil	Nathalie Boisclair

== Economy ==
Pascan Aviation has its headquarters in Saint-Hubert. St-Hubert Fer & Metaux Inc located on Chambly Road is a recycling centre that has been serving the city of St-Hubert since 1956. It is currently owned by the third generation Bulka Family.

== Neighbourhoods ==
Today, there are four distinct sectors of Saint-Hubert:

- Iberville
- Laflèche
- Laurendeau
- Maricourt

=== Historic neighbourhoods ===
The following is a list of localities (Note: 'Locality' refers to the historical place names of former census subdivisions (municipalities), former designated places and former urban areas, as well as to the names of other entities, such as neighbourhoods, post offices, communities and unincorporated places. (source)) within the borough of Saint-Hubert.

Brentwood

Brentwood was located in between Kimber Street and Chambly Road. Noble Road was among the main streets in the area, with Cousineau Boulevard becoming important much later on. Noble Road was named for Benjamin Noble, superintendent and resident of the area, upon its founding in the late 1910s. Brentwood was considered a "summer hideaway" by many Montrealers. It had no streets, electricity or telephone service. A small "hut-like" train station was located next to the railroad tracks and provided service to Montreal via the Montreal and Southern Counties Railway.

Brookline

Brookline was also located in between Kimber Street and Chambly Road. Mountainview Boulevard was the locale's main street, with Cousineau Boulevard becoming a major artery much later on. Brookline was an anglophone working-class area. The tramway station was located on the southwest part of the railroad tracks, between Rideau Street and Léonard Street.

Castle Gardens

Castle Gardens was the smallest of Saint-Hubert's neighbourhoods. It was located in between the CN railway line, and Grande-Allée (formerly known as Côte-Noire Road), in between Canon Street and Jonergin Street (originally known as Ireland Street).

Croydon

Croydon, or St. Lambert Annex, was a large neighbourhood located along Saint-Hubert Rise from Grande Allée to Maricourt Boulevard at the railroad tracks. Along the railroad tracks, it stretched from Saint-Hubert Rise to Donat Street, while its borders became smaller closer to Grande Alleé. It was an English-speaking working-class area. Croydon's limits expanded in 1935 to include Castle Gardens.

East Greenfield

East Greenfield was located in close proximity to what is today known as the Litchfield Industrial Park. It stretched from Grande-Allée to Maricourt Boulevard. The following streets ran north–south: Cornwall, Westley, Quévillon, Kensington, Belmont, Nantel, Campbell. Perpendicular to these streets were Barlow, Milligan, Viateur, Lalande, Mcrae, Spriggs and Robinson. In 1935, its boundaries were extended to the nearby municipality of Saint-Joseph de Chambly. The 1935 census indicated that the majority of residents along Grande-Allée were francophone, while the rest of the area had a substantial anglophone population. The area was served by St. Stephen Anglican Church and Westley United Church.

Pinehurst

Pinehurst was located east of to East Greenfield, and could be accessed by Cornwall Street. This area started to develop in the mid-1910s.

Springfield Park

Springfield Park was located in between Kimber Street and Boulevard Cousineau. It was originally an English-speaking rural area served by the Montreal and Southern Counties Railway. Today it is primarily a French-speaking suburban area. Springfield Street, now known as Prince Charles Street, was the neighbourhood's main street.

== Demographics ==
Historical populations
Year	Pop.	±%
1901	963	—
1911	952	−1.1%
1921	2,225	+133.7%
1931	1,981	−11.0%
1941	2,457	+24.0%
1951	6,494	+164.3%
1961	14,380	+121.4%
1971	36,789	+155.8%
1981	60,573	+64.6%
1991	74,093	+22.3%
1996	77,042	+4.0%
2001	75,912	−1.5%
2006	77,028	+1.5%

Home language (2006)
Language	Population	Pct (%)
French	64,130	84.04%
English	7,005	9.18%
Both English and French	850	1.11%
Non Official language only	4,145	5.43%

== Education ==
English-language Primary

- Kensington Elementary (closed)
- Royal Charles Elementary
- Royal Oak Elementary (closed)
- Terry Fox Elementary
- Vincent Massey (closed)

French-language Primary

- Ecole Primaire Charles-LeMoyne
- Ecole Primaire D'Iberville
- Ecole Primaire de La Mosaïque
- Ecole Primaire De Maricourt
- Ecole Primaire des Mille-Fleurs
- Ecole Primaire des Quatre-Saisons
- Ecole Primaire des Quatre-Vents (closed)
- Ecole Primaire Du Jardin-Bienville
- Ecole Primaire Gaétan-Boucher
- Ecole Primaire Laurent-Benoît
- Ecole Primaire Maurice-L.-Duplessis
- École Primaire Mille-Sports
- Ecole Primaire Monseigneur-Forget
- Ecole Primaire Paul-Chagnon
- Ecole Primaire Saint-Joseph
- Ecole Primaire Socrates

Secondary

- English-language
  - Heritage Regional High School
  - Royal George (closed)
- French-language
  - École Secondaire André-Laurendeau
  - École Secondaire Mgr-A.-M.-Parent

Post Secondary (French-language)

- École nationale d'aérotechnique (Collège Édouard-Montpetit)

The South Shore Protestant Regional School Board previously served the municipality.

== Transportation ==
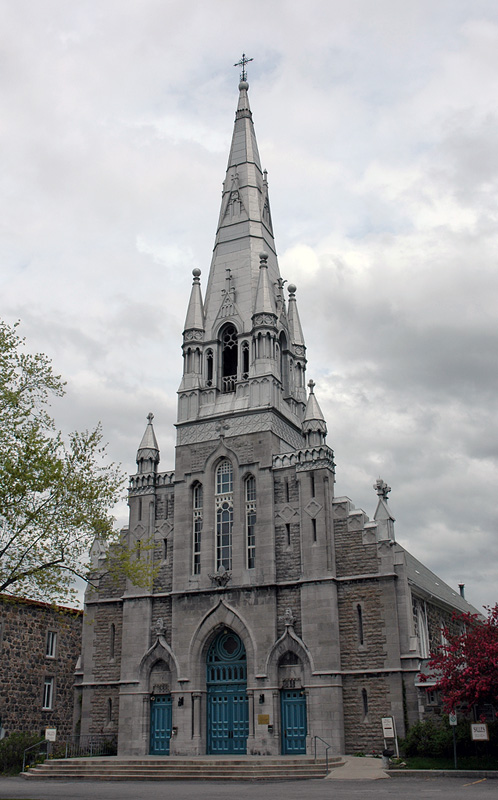
Église St-Hubert located on Chambly Road.

Airport

The borough has a medium-sized airport known as Montréal/St-Hubert Airport. In terms of aircraft movements, it is among the busiest in Canada. The airport was once the location of a Canadian Air Force Base which ceased operation in 1995, but which continues to use the area. The airport includes a weather station, next to which stands the headquarters of the Canadian Space Agency.

Rail

Saint-Hubert is served by the Longueuil–Saint-Hubert commuter rail station on the Réseau de transport métropolitain's Mont-Saint-Hilaire line.

Important roads

- Grande-Allée
- Taschereau Boulevard
- Cousineau Boulevard
- Chambly Road
- Payer Boulevard
- Mountainview Boulevard
- Kimber / Maricourt Boulevards
- Gaëtan Boucher Boulevard

== Sister cities ==
- Saint-Nazaire, France (1991)

== Notable people ==
- Gaétan Boucher, speedskater
- Kaytranada, DJ and producer
- Jon Lajoie, comedian
- Irina Lazareanu, model
- Patrick Leduc, soccer player
- Marie-Claude Molnar, paralympic cyclist

== See also ==
- List of former cities in Quebec
- List of mayors of Longueuil, Quebec
- Longueuil City Council
- Municipal reorganization in Quebec
