= Black v Chrétien =

2001 Canadian court case

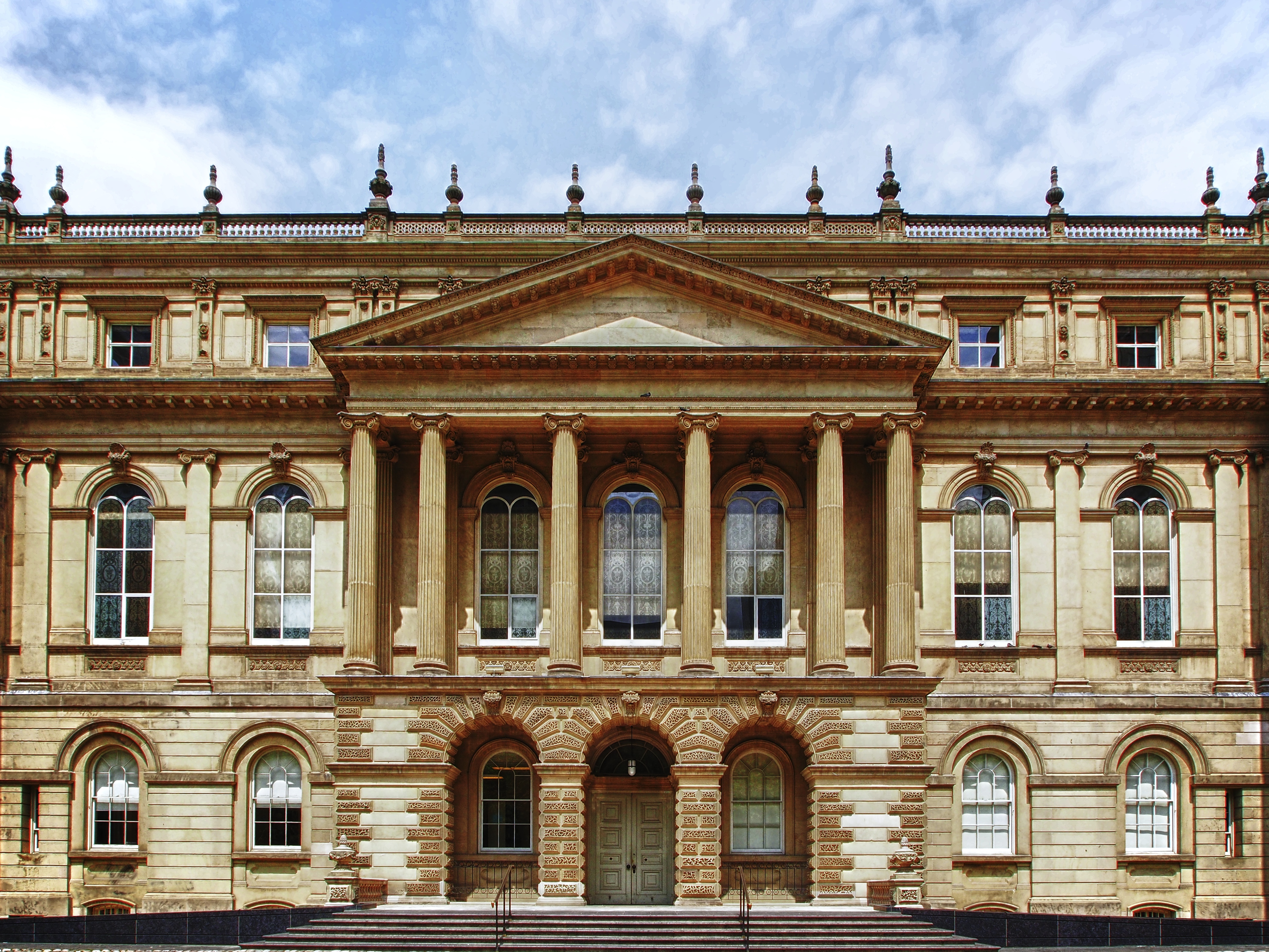
- Court: Ontario Court of Appeal
- Full case name: Conrad Black v. Jean Chrétien and The Attorney General of Canada
- Decided: 2001-05-18
- Citations: 2001 CanLII 8537 (ON CA); 54 OR (3d) 215; 199 DLR (4th) 228

Case history
- Appealed from: Black v. Canada (Prime Minister), 2000 CanLII 22629 (ON SC)

Court membership
- Judges sitting: John I. Laskin, Stephen T. Goudge and Kathryn N. Feldman

Case opinions
- Decision by: Laskin J.A

Black v Chrétien (2001) is the name of a legal dispute between businessman Conrad Black and Canadian Prime Minister Jean Chrétien over Chrétien's ability to prevent Black, a dual Canadian-British citizen, from obtaining a peerage in the British House of Lords. The Court of Appeal for Ontario ruled in favour of Chrétien, and Black renounced his Canadian citizenship.

== Chrétien's arguments ==
Elizabeth II, as Queen of the United Kingdom, acted on the advice of British Prime Minister Tony Blair to honour Black by raising him to the peerage. However, the Canadian Prime Minister, Jean Chrétien, gave the conflicting advice to Elizabeth II as Queen of Canada that the government's position was that a Canadian citizen should not receive such a titular honour, citing the non-binding 1919 Nickle Resolution. Chrétien held that, despite the British government honouring Black as a British citizen, and Black's holding dual citizenship of Canada and Britain (allowed since 1977), the Canadian Cabinet had the right to make known the government's stance relating to elevating Black to the British peerage as he was also a Canadian citizen.

In similar cases, Welsh-born computer entrepreneur Sir Terry Matthews and Winnipeg-born Sir George Sayers Bain, head of Queen's University in Belfast, both Canadian citizens but British residents, were honoured with knighthoods. Chrétien was quoted by a BBC report as saying

"What I and the government object to is that, by conferring the knighthoods without seeking the agreement of the Canadian government, you have not taken into account the Canadian government policy with regard to how Canadian citizens should be honoured."

== Black's arguments ==
Black said he would accept the peerage as a British citizen instead, but Chrétien held firm to his ministerial advice. Black then argued that this strict interpretation of the Nickle Resolution was payback for his political opinions and past criticism of Chrétien, and sued the prime minister unsuccessfully.

Black's supporters argued that Canada did not object to the granting of honours to dual citizens such as Ontario native Sir Godman Irvine who was knighted in 1986. So too was a prominent Quebecker, the British and Canadian industrialist Sir Neil Shaw (1929–2023), in 1994. Finally, former prime minister Pierre Trudeau's own personal expert on Canadian symbols, Sir Conrad Swan, was knighted by the Queen when he was serving in the Royal Household as Garter Principal King of Arms (1992–1995), the chief heraldic officer at London's College of Arms.

The British government disagreed on the grounds that it was honouring its own citizens who only happened to be Canadians as well. It held that it was inappropriate for the Prime Minister of Canada to advise the Queen of the United Kingdom, just as it would have been inappropriate for the British Prime Minister to advise the Queen of Canada on Canadian domestic affairs.

== Court decision ==
The court concluded that the prime minister had a constitutional right to advise the Queen of Canada on exercising her royal prerogative. However, in this case, the prime minister's advice was to a "foreign head of state", and subsequently Elizabeth II did not receive the Prime Minister's "advice in her capacity as Queen of Canada; rather he was advising the Queen as a foreign head of state in her capacity as the Queen of the United Kingdom of Great Britain and Northern Ireland as to Canada's policy regarding the conferral of foreign honours on its citizens, an act he could have done for any foreign head of state". In short, the prime minister was simply informing a foreign state of Canada's policy regarding the granting of honours to its citizens, an act which the court found that he had the legal privilege to do.

== Aftermath of the affair ==
In 2001, Black renounced his citizenship of Canada, which he then called "an oppressive little world". Eric Reguly wrote in The Times: "The great man fled his native Canada for Britain. He couldn't wait to leave, he said, because Canada was turning into a Third World dump run by raving socialists." Black's lawyer, Eddie Greenspan, later stated Black's citizenship "was stolen from him" by "spiteful" former prime minister Jean Chrétien.

Black was granted a life peerage as Baron Black of Crossharbour, in the London Borough of Tower Hamlets. Lord Black sat as a member of the Conservative Party until July 13, 2007, when he was denied the whip (effectively, expulsion from the Conservative benches) because of his conviction on fraud charges. On May 15, 2019, he was granted a full pardon by President Donald Trump.

In September 2006, The Globe and Mail reported Black was taking steps to regain Canadian citizenship. He may have desired this to qualify for prisoner exchange and benefit from Canadian early release policies or to enable him to cross the border following a conviction. In a TVOntario interview, Black claimed, "I always said that I would take my citizenship back, and if it wasn't for all these legal problems, I would have done it by now." He told interviewer Steve Paikin that he was working through "normal channels". Black also said, "I have settled into my new life as freedom fighter. It's very interesting, it's quite stimulating in a way, but it is an ordeal."

Even without Canadian citizenship, Black continued to be a member of the Queen's Privy Council for Canada, to which he was appointed by Governor General Ray Hnatyshyn, on the advice of Prime Minister Brian Mulroney, in 1992. The appointment was strictly honorific, as the Privy Council has no substantive power and meets very rarely. In fact, the council last formally met in 1981, so Black never actually attended a Privy Council meeting. In 2014 Conrad Black was once again living in Canada; however, the Governor General accepted the advice of the Order of Canada Advisory Committee and the Prime Minister to remove Black from both the Order of Canada and the Privy Council.

Black regained his Canadian citizenship in April 2023.
