= Reguly =

Reguly may refer to:

- Antal Reguly
- Eric Reguly
- Robert Reguly
- Reguły, a village in Poland
- Mount Regula, Research Range, Ural Mountains (named after Antal Reguly)
