= William Obront =

Canadian gangster (1924–2017)

- Born: 27 March 1924; Montreal, Quebec, Canada
- Died: 12 October 2017 (aged 93); Miami, Florida, U.S.
- Other name: "Willie Obie"
- Occupation: Gangster
- Allegiance: Cotroni crime family
- Convictions: Fraud (1976); Tax evasion (1979); Drug trafficking (1984)
- Penalty: 4 years' imprisonment (1976); 20 months' imprisonment (1979); 20 years' imprisonment (1984)

William Obront (27 March 1924 – 12 October 2017), better known as "Obie", was a Canadian-American gangster and the principal money launderer for the Cotroni family of Montreal, often described as being the "Canadian Meyer Lansky".

== Criminal career ==
=== Money launderer ===
One of three children of Rebecca and Jacob Obront, he was born in Montreal into a family of butchers of Russian-Jewish descent. Obront began working in his uncle's butcher shop in the Atwater Market as a teenager. In the late 1940s, he opened up the Hi-Ho Cafe and the Bal Tabarin nightclub, both of which were popular with the Montreal underworld. Regular visitors to Obront's businesses included the gangsters Vincenzo Cotroni and Nicola Di Iorio of Montreal along with Salvatore Giglio of New York's Bonanno family. In 1950, he opened up the Beret Blue nightclub alongside the gangsters Peter Adamo and Frank D'Asti. His businesses were considered to be just fronts for money laundering for the Cotroni family. Obront had allied himself to Cotroni once he saw the profits to be made from the French Connection heroin smuggling network-of which Cotroni played a key role in-and offered his services as a money launderer. Obront came to be known as "Canada's Meyer Lansky" as he played a role within the Cotroni family analogous to that played by Meyer Lansky within the American Mafia. Peter Edwards, the crime correspondent of The Toronto Star newspaper, wrote: "Obront gave the Cotronis a conduit between the streets and mainstream business, and between the Italian gangs of St. Leonard and Montreal's Jewish community, of which Obront was a member in poor standing".

By the end of the 1950s, Obront was a millionaire, and on 12 October 1961, he founded Trans-World Investment Ltd, which engaged in both legal and illegal financial ventures. One of Obront's clients was Mitchell Bronfman of the famous Bronfman family. Mitchell was the nephew of the whiskey tycoon Samuel Bronfman, who was one of Canada's richest men. Mitchell Bronfman had opened up the Execaire Aviation Limited airline, which operated unprofitably between 1962 and 1974. Despite being a Bronfman, he was unable to access the family fortune, which was held in trust, forcing him to turn to Obront to keep his airline flying. Between 1967 and 1974, Bronfman borrowed $1,417,250 from Obront. The association with Bronfman served to give Obront credibility on Saint Jacques Street (the financial district of Montreal). During his career as a money launderer, Obront moved at least $83 million via his various bank accounts for Vic Cotroni and his underboss Paolo Violi. Edwards wrote about Obront's work: "His job was to hide the true ownership of funds raised through gambling, loan-sharking, drug-smuggling and other enterprises, and also to put those millions of dollars to work, generating further revenues." Obront's access to interest-free capital and the services of Cotroni family thugs put the legitimate businesses that competed with Obront's businesses in the investment, home-improvement, restaurant, meat-packing, laundry and construction industries in the Montreal area at a "daunting disadvantage". As a non-Italian in the Cotroni family, Obront's relations with both Cotroni and Violi were correct, but never friendly. Obront always described Cotroni and Violi as his business partners and never as his friends.

=== The Munsinger affair ===
In 1966, Obront featured heavily in the Munsinger affair. The Munsinger Affair was a scandal occasioned by the discovery that Gerda Munsinger, a German woman who lived in Canada and who was accused of being a Soviet spy, had been the long-time mistress of the former associate defense minister Pierre Sévigny. Munsinger, a prostitute in her native Germany, had worked as a waitress at the Chic 'n' Coop Restaurant in Montreal which was owned by Obront. Allegations were made that Obront was aware of Munsinger's relationship with Sévigny and had set up secret cameras in her bedroom to record Munsinger having sex with Sévigny while he was the associate defense minister for the purpose of blackmailing the government of John Diefenbaker. Munsinger, who returned to Germany by the time the scandal broke, was initially described as being dead. Robert Reguly, a reporter from The Toronto Star tracked her down to her apartment in Munich, and she stated in the ensuring interview that she had feared Obront, whom she described as being very close to a number of powerful gangsters in Montreal. A journalist, Pax Plante, called Cotroni and Obront "The Untouchables" of the Montreal underworld who could never be prosecuted.

=== Tainted meat merchant ===
In 1967, four different companies controlled by Obront won the right to supply meat for the concession stands at Expo 67. The Fleu de Ly Vending Machine Company, owned by Obront's nephew Joe Frankel, was one of the companies supplying the meat which in turn came from Obront-owned Obie's Meat Market, which purchased its meat in turn from Reggio Foods. The owner of Reggio Foods was Armand Courville of the Cotroni family. At the time, Claude Wagner, a politician with the Liberal party accused the Union Nationale government of Daniel Johnson Sr. of corruption, saying all four companies that won the contracts to supply food for the concession stands at Expo 67 were run by people from the Cotroni family. In 1968, Obront was questioned by the police in connection with two murders. One of the murder victims was a man who was behind in a loan to Obront who was executed by a hooded hitman while paying cards. The criminal Marvin Elkind sometimes served as Obront's chauffeur. Elkind later stated that Cotroni called Obront "the butcher" on the account of his role in selling tainted meat and because of the people who kept dying after eating Obront's rancid meat. Elkind further noted that both Cotroni and Obront felt absolutely no guilt about selling rancid meat that caused people to become sick and sometimes die, saying all that both men cared about was money.

In 1975, the Royal Commission known as La Commission d'Enquête sur le Crime Organisé (CECO) reported that 400,000 pounds of the meat supplied to Expo 67 was unfit for human consumption as Obront and his associates used meat intended as dog food instead in order to increase his profits. In 1973, the firm of Reggio Foods supplied the meat at the Quebec Summer Games at Rouyn-Noranda, which caused so many athletes to become seriously ill after eating the meat that the games had to be cancelled. The Quebec health authorities seized 20,000 pounds of meat from Reggio Foods, which turned out to be decaying horse meat with the labels saying it was unfit for human consumption having been ripped off. In 1975, Reggio Foods was shut down by the Quebec health authorities for its gross violations of the food safety laws, through Courville was not charged. The tainted meat scandal along with the revelation that much of the meat sold at the concession stands at Expo 67 was unfit for human consumption brought Obront along with the other leaders of the Cotroni family much notoriety in Quebec.

=== Stock market fraudster ===
Obront also engaged in stock market fraud, manipulating the prices of shares and engaging in insider trading. Obront ultimately faced 400 charges of financial misconduct for his "boiler room" stock market operations. As a non-Italian, Obront could never be a "made man", but he was known to be close to both Vincenzo Cotroni and Paolo Violi who used him very heavily to launder their money. In 1973, Obront took charge of the bookmaking in the Ottawa-Hull area on behalf of the Cotroni family. Obront's operations in the Ottawa area handled an average of about $50,000 in bets per day, with 25% of the daily earnings going to Violi. Through his partner Harry Workman, Obront took control of a number of brokerage firms with good reputations, which he liked because it made it easier for him to swindle the investors. The people who invested their wealth in Obront-controlled brokerage firms almost always lost their money.

Though Obront was talented at making money, he was also by his own admission "a degenerate gambler" who had a compulsion to gamble, sometimes betting as much as $50,000 on a typical weekend. To assist with his money laundering, Obront incorporated numerous companies, many of which were just "dummy corporations" which existed only to create a confusing paper trail. Between 1950 and 1975, Obront was involved in 38 different companies as either an owner, director or shareholder. La Commission d'Enuête sur le Crime Organisé in its 1977 report Organized Crime and the World of Business stated:

One of the characteristics common to all the companies incorporated in Quebec in which William Obront was known to have had interests, openly or through a front-man, is the fact that they almost never complied with the laws concerning the information required annually from companies in Quebec...People who hide behind many real or fictitious corporations are also trying to cover their tracks and mislead the police, the income tax authorities, and the public. Tycoons are very adept at using this technique. William Obront did not invent or create this method, but he made use of it on a grand scale for a long time.

As the chief financial officer for the Cotroni family, Obront had to provide thousands of dollars in cash for various illegal transactions, often on a short notice as Violi would tell him to provide the money for any transaction that he was engaged in. When one businessman told Violi that he wanted to bring a shipment of sheep and lambs from Texas for his meat-packing factory, Violi told him: "The best thing is to call Willie Obront and ask him to make a cheque for $5,000". Violi called Obront who told him: "Send him over here and he will have it [a cheque for $5,000]".

The branch of the Bank of Montreal at 637 Decarie street was known as the "Obront gang branch". At the hearings conducted by CECO, a senior manager at the Bank of Montreal, Jean-Yves Grégoire, testified that he did not want to work at the branch at 637 Decarie because it was known as the "Mafia branch". A vice-president at the Bank of Montreal who testified anonymously to protect his life and his job confirmed Grégoire's testimony as he stated that the branch at 637 Decarie was run by "Obront and his gang" with the full knowledge and approval of the Bank of Montreal. The official testified about the influence of Obront at the branch at 637 Decarie that "everybody knew about it". The vice-president also testified that there was "an established credit line" to Obront running into the hundreds of thousands of dollars, which would only be possible with the approval of senior regional management as the management of the branch did not have that power. Grégoire testified that the line of credit to Obront was used for loan-sharking as it allowed the Bank of Montreal via the proxy of Obront to make loans to people whose poverty made them ineligible for loans from the bank while at the same time avoiding the disrepute that would have been occasioned by engaging in loan-sharking itself. Grégoire further testified that the Bank of Montreal had a vested interest in refusing loan requests as it forced the poor and the desperate to take out loans from Obront, who would always call out the Cotroni family thugs if someone fell behind in a loan.

Angelo Lanzo, a Cotroni family member called Obront from a pay phone at the Sirloin Barn Restaurant, which was tapped by the police. The intercept recorded the following:

"Obront: Going to see the Egg [Cotroni] tonight?
Lanzo: Yeah. That's why I called you. He wants to see you.
Obront: Eh?
Lanzo: He wants to see you...
Obront: You, calling me on the phone, you, it's like the worse, worse possible thing, eh, Angie. This phone is like one hundred percent tapped.
Lanzo: So, what the fuck, I'm not entitled to call you and see you...
Obront: Well, what d'you want me to tell you? I'm not going to have an argument with you.
Lanzo: Okay.
Obront: I'm telling you, it's murder, I want to meet you...to wait...and if you have something to say, you tell me, but it's no good this way".

=== Conviction ===
From 1970 to 1975, Obront had at least nine bank accounts at four different banks. In 1974 and 1975, bank records showed that 46 people and 14 companies deposited amounts ranging from $2,500 to $1.7 million in Obront's bank accounts. La Commission d'Enquête sur le Crime Organisé discovered that some of the cheques that were deposited into Obront's bank account at 637 Decarie branch of the Bank of Montreal were signed Simon Templar (the hero of a popular 1960s British television show The Saint), Marc Codeau (one of the commissioners with CECO) and Pierre Trudeau. Obront's financial records show that he made a profit of $18 million for the Cotroni family in 1974 and 1975 while Obront in filing his taxes claimed an annual income of only $38,000. In August 1974, Obront fled to Florida to avoid having to testify at La Commission d'Enquête sur le Crime Organisé. In Miami, Obront applied for U.S. citizenship. He ceded his Canadian citizenship in order to become an American national in November 1975.

In 1975, Obront was charged with tax evasion, with the government claiming that he had an undeclared income of $2,197,801 between 1965 and 1973. In May 1976, following an extradition request from Canada, Obront fled to Costa Rica, but was ordered to return to Canada. Despite being a fugitive, Obront while he was in Costa Rica received a loan from the Banque Canadienne Nationale for $15, 000 at an interest rate of 12.5% at a time when the average Canadians paid an interest rate of 13.5% on their loans. The Banque Canadienne Nationale justified the loan under the grounds that Obront was one of their best customers. Valmore Delisle, the manager of the Banque Canadienne Nationale's branch at 500 Place d'Armes, testified at the CECO commission that he never changed his policies towards Obront because he was "financially solvent". Under handcuffs from the detectives from the Royal Canadian Mounted Police, Obront was flown back to Canada. On 27 May 1976, Obront finally appeared before the CECO commission with his only words being: "I refuse to be sworn in". Justice Jean "Bulldog" Dutil, the chief commissioner, told Obront that he could either testify or go to prison for a year for contempt of the royal commission. When Obront still refused to testify, Dutil sentenced him to prison.

For refusing to testify at the commission, Obront served a year in prison. Obront was also convicted of defrauding investors in Obie's Meat Market of $51,991 and sentenced to four years in prison and fined $75,000 on 3 December 1976. In May 1977, Obront again appeared before CECO and still refused to testify, saying "I don't know why you called me here. I don't feel I'm a witness. I'm an accused. All the one-sided stories you get here, that's not justice". For refusing to testify for a second time, Dutil again sentenced Obront to a year in prison for contempt of the royal commission. Obront's 22 year-old son, Alan, told the media that his father was being held in harsh conditions at the maximum security Laval Institute, saying: "He's living in a small cell with no windows and a pan on the floor for a toilet. He spends 23.5 hours a day in his cell. He has absolutely no contact with people and his meals are passed through a little slit in the door. And he doesn't even see the guard that feeds him. It's torture. There's no excuse for it for a man charged with a white collar crime".

In 1978, the Commisso brothers sent the hitman Cecil Kirby to Montreal to kill Irving Kott, a stockbroker who worked for Cotroni and Obront. Kirby was told that Cotroni had received a contract to kill Kott from one of his business partners who in turn had passed on the contract to the Commisso brothers, but he believed that Kott had cheated Cotroni who did not want to admit to being fooled. In 1979, Obront was convicted of tax evasion and sentenced to 20 months in prison plus ordered to pay $683,3046 in back taxes. As he was no longer a Canadian citizen, he was expelled to the U.S. after serving his sentence.

Obront was convicted of immigration violations in Miami on 2 December 1980, causing U.S. authorities to seek his deportation. On 21 July 1983, he was arrested in Florida together with Nick Cotroni, the son of Vic Cotroni, on charges of smuggling the Quaalude drug from Quebec into Florida, making an annual profit of about US$50 million. Operation Canadian Connection, as the police operation against Obront was named, revealed that Obront was responsible for smuggling 70% of all the Quaaludes sold in the United States with the profits being enormous. It cost only a nickel to make a single pill of Quaaludes, which were sold on the street for US$7 per pill. Obront had smuggled in 13.5 million Quaaludes into the United States since 1981. The Miami police found a kilogram of cocaine worth US$387,000 in Obront's house when he was arrested. Obront was convicted in an American court of twelve drug-related charges on 7 June 1984. He was sentenced to serve a 20-year prison term and ordered to pay $50,000 in restitution. Incarcerated at USP Lewisburg in Pennsylvania, Obront had his U.S. citizenship revoked by American authorities. His subsequent appeals to the Federal Court to have his Canadian citizenship reinstated were unsuccessful. Obront was released from prison in March 2002.

== Death ==
Obront died at a retirement home in Miami on 12 October 2017, at the age of 93.

== Books ==
- Auger, Michel; Edwards, Peter (2004). The Encyclopedia of Canadian Organized Crime: From Captain Kidd to Mom Boucher. Toronto: McClelland & Stewart. ISBN 0771030495.
- Edwards, Peter (1990). Blood Brothers: How Canada's Most Powerful Mafia Family Runs Its Business. Toronto: Key Porter Books. ISBN 155013213X.
- Humphreys, Adrian (2011). The Weasel: A Double Life in the Mob. Toronto: John Wiley & Sons. ISBN 0470964510.
- Langton, Jerry (2015). Cold War How Organized Crime Works in Canada and Why It's About to Get More Violent. Toronto: HarperColllins. ISBN 978-1-4434-3255-9.
- O'Connor, D'Arcy (2011). Montreal's Irish Mafia: The True Story of the Infamous West End Gang. John Wiley & Sons. ISBN 9780470676158.
- Schneider, Stephen (2009). Iced The Story of Organized Crime in Canada. Toronto: John Wiley & Sons. ISBN 9780470835005.
