= Law clerk =

Personal assistant and counsel to a judge

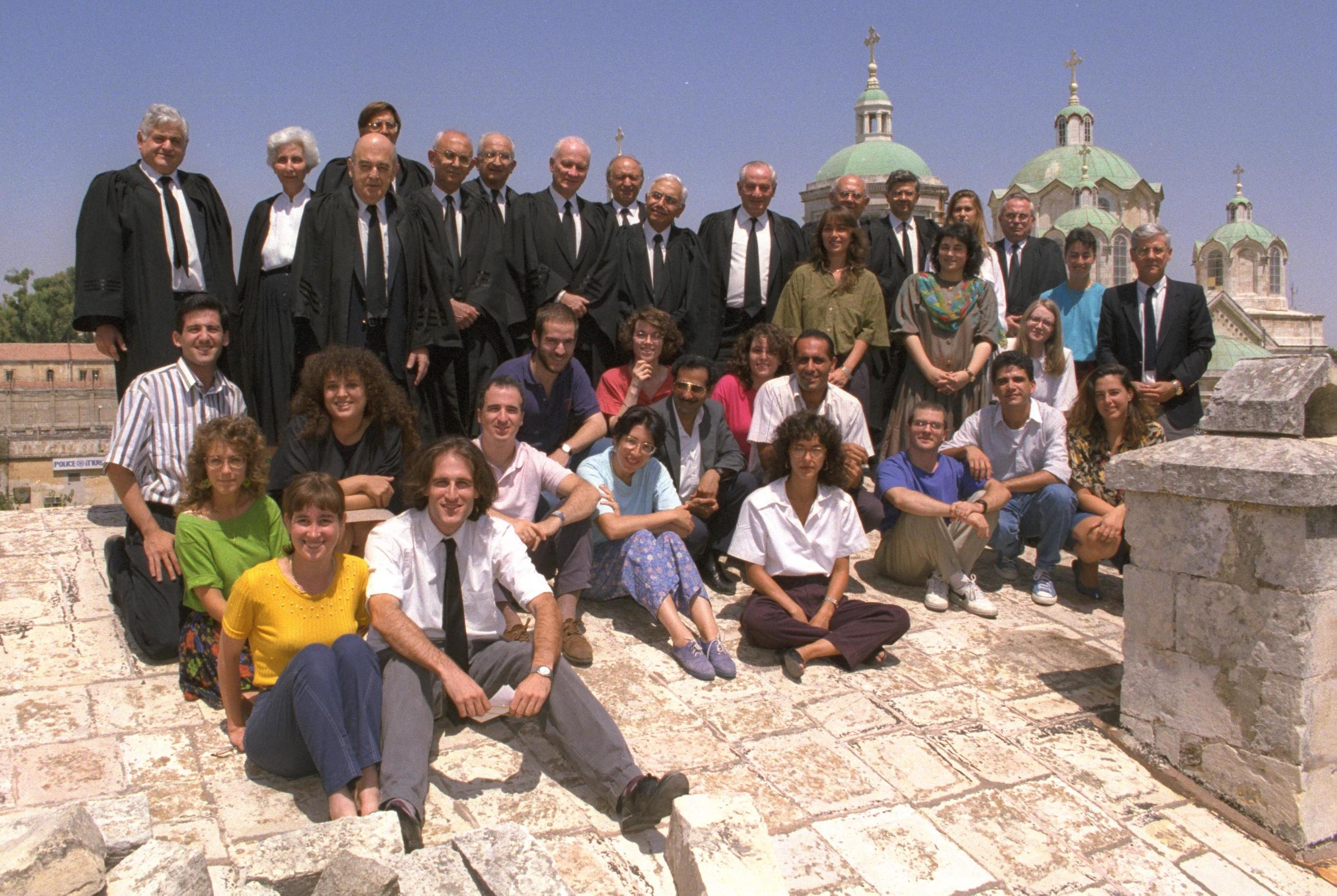
Justices of the Supreme Court of Israel with their law clerks, 1992

A law clerk, judicial clerk, or judicial assistant is a person, typically a lawyer, who provides direct counsel and assistance to a judge or lawyer by researching issues and drafting legal opinions for cases before the court. Judicial clerks often play significant roles in the formation of case law through their influence upon judges' decisions. Judicial clerks should not be confused with legal clerks (also called "law clerks" in Canada), court clerks, or courtroom deputies who only provide secretarial and administrative support to attorneys and/or judges.

Judicial law clerks are usually recent law school graduates who performed at or near the top of their class and/or attended highly ranked law schools. Serving as a law clerk is considered to be one of the most prestigious positions in legal circles, and tends to open up wide-ranging opportunities in academia, law firm practice, and influential government work.

In some countries, judicial clerks are known as judicial associates or judicial assistants. In many nations, clerk duties are performed by permanent staff attorneys or junior apprentice-like judges, such as those that sit on France's Conseil d'État. In British and Hong Kong courts, they are known as judicial assistants. The European Court of Justice uses permanent staff attorneys (référendaires) and stagiaires (young law graduates). Australia, Canada, Sweden, and Brazil have notable clerk systems.

== Australia ==
See Judge's associate and Tipstaff.

== Canada ==
Most Canadian courts accept applications for judicial clerkships from graduating law students or experienced lawyers who have already been called to the Bar in Canada or abroad (typically in the United States or the United Kingdom). Most provincial superior and appellate courts hire at least one clerk for each judge. Typically students in their last two years of law school are eligible to apply for these positions, but increasingly, experienced practicing lawyers are also considered for these positions. The term typically lasts a year and generally fulfills the articling requirement for provincial law societies, which qualifies a person to become a practising lawyer in a Canadian jurisdiction.

The most prestigious clerkship available is with the country's highest court, the Supreme Court of Canada. There are also clerkships at the Federal Court of Appeal and the Federal Court, as well as the Courts of Appeal and Superior Courts of various provinces. Each Justice of the Supreme Court hires three clerks for a one-year period. The Federal Court of Appeal, which is based in Ottawa but hears cases across the country, selects 15 law clerks each year, or one per judge. The Federal Court also hires only one clerk per judge, or about 30 per year in total. The Court of Appeal for Ontario selects 17 law clerks, who serve either one or two of the 24 Justices. The Quebec Court of Appeal usually hires a similar number of law clerks for both Montreal and Quebec City but is unusual among Canadian courts in having a formal clerkship program for law students in addition to law graduates. The Court of Appeal for Saskatchewan hires 3 clerks, each of whom is assigned to 2 to 3 judges. The New Brunswick Court of Appeal hires two law graduates, who serve as law clerks working under the direct supervision of the Chief Justice of New Brunswick. Successful candidates for all clerkships, particularly provincial appellate and federal courts, are usually selected based on a distinguished academic record, academic recommendations, strong research and writing skills, and interviews with judges. For both the Supreme Court of Canada and the Quebec Court of Appeal, being able to work in both English and French is strongly preferred.

The Tax Court of Canada hires 12 clerks annually.

Many law clerks have gone on to become leaders of the profession. For example, the Hon. Mr. Justice Jean Cote of the Alberta Court of Appeal was one of the first Supreme Court law clerks, serving as a clerk in the program's inaugural year (1967). Similarly, the Hon. Madam Justice Louise Arbour, formerly of the Supreme Court of Canada, the International Criminal Tribunal for Rwanda and the International Criminal Tribunal for the former Yugoslavia and former UN High Commissioner for Human Rights, also served as a law clerk in the early years of the program. Meanwhile, the Hon. Madam Justice Andromache Karakatsanis of the Supreme Court of Canada and the Hon. Madam Justice Kathryn N. Feldman of the Ontario Court of Appeal were formerly law clerks at the Ontario Court of Appeal.

== England and Wales ==
In England and Wales, law clerks are called judicial assistants. It is possible to be a judicial assistant at the Court of Appeal and at the UK Supreme Court (formerly the Appellate Committee of the House of Lords). Only Supreme Court judicial assistants are appointed for a full-time, one-year fixed-term appointment. Since 2006 they have taken part in a week-long exchange in Washington DC at the U.S. Supreme Court established by the late Justice Antonin Scalia and Lord Rodger of Earlsferry.

A separate position, clerks to HM judges (or judges' clerks), act as administrative assistants to judges of the High Court and Court of Appeal of England and Wales.

== European Court of Justice ==
Sally Kenney's article on clerks, or référendaires, on the European Court of Justice (ECJ) provides one detailed point of comparison (2000). There are some major differences between ECJ clerks and their American counterparts, largely because of the way the ECJ is structured. One key difference is that ECJ clerks, while hired by individual judges, serve long tenures as opposed to the one-year-clerkship norm at the U.S. Supreme Court. This gives ECJ clerks considerable expertise and power. Because ECJ judges serve six-year renewable terms and do not issue individual opinions, the most important role of ECJ clerks is to facilitate uniformity and continuity across chambers, member-states, and over time.

Furthermore, this role is heightened because the European Union is composed of nations with disparate legal systems. Kenney found that ECJ clerks provide legal and linguistic expertise (all opinions are issued in French), ease the workload of their members, participate in oral and written interactions between chambers, and provide continuity as members rapidly change. While Kenney concludes that they have more power than their counterparts on the U.S. Supreme Court, ECJ clerks act as agents for their principals—judges—and are not the puppeteers that critics claim.

The ECJ also admits a limited number of selected law graduates as Stagiaires. Their duties are more similar to those of the law clerks of the U.S. Supreme Court.

== France ==
In France, law clerks are called juristes assistants. They typically go through a competitive nomination and interview process to get accepted as law clerks. Most French courts accept applications for judicial clerkships from graduating law students. Students in their last year of law school are eligible to apply, although most law clerks are PhD candidates in Law or candidates for the bar exam or a French civil service competitive entrance exam such as French National School for the Judiciary, French National School of Public Finances, or French National School of Court Clerks.

=== In the judicial order ===
Law clerks (juristes assistants) are hired for three years renewable once. Depending on credentials and curriculum they can be assigned to the bench (magistrat du siège) or the prosecution (parquet or parquet général).

The work of a law clerk entails assisting the judges with writing verdicts and decisions and conducting legal inquiries and research.

The most prestigious clerkships available in France are before courts of appeals, which review decisions of lower courts.

=== In the administrative order ===
A similar system exists in the administrative courts, including the Conseil d'Etat.

== Germany ==
In Germany, there are two different kinds of law clerks.

Students of law who, after law school, have passed the first of two required examinations join the Referendariat, a time of two years consisting of a series of clerkships: for a civil law judge, a criminal law judge or a prosecutor, a government office and finally at a law firm. The purpose of this clerkship is solely the legal education of the clerk (Referendar) and not giving assistance to his instructor.

In the Federal Supreme Courts (see Judiciary of Germany) and the office of the Federal Prosecutor General, the duties of law clerks are performed by wissenschaftliche Mitarbeiter (German for "scientific assistant"). With few exceptions, they are lower court judges or civil servants, assigned for a period of three years to the respective Federal Court, and their clerkships serve as a qualification for a higher judgeship. However, some justices of the Federal Constitutional Court (who have the right to select their wissenschaftliche Mitarbeiter personally) prefer clerks from outside the courts or the civil service, especially those who are or were professors of law and who often hire people from academia (sometimes even young law professors). The clerks of the Federal Constitutional Court are deemed very influential and are therefore dubbed the (unofficial) Dritter Senat ("Third Senate") as opposed to the two official "senates" of eight justices each which form the court.

== Hong Kong ==
In Hong Kong, law clerks are known as judicial assistants. Since 2009, the Court of Final Appeal has been offering full-time, one-year fixed-term appointments to junior lawyers who graduated from highly ranked law schools. This program was initiated under the auspices of former Chief Justice Geoffrey Ma.

The selection process for the position of judicial assistant is highly competitive. Applicants are typically required to have strong academic backgrounds, possessing first-class LLB or LLM degrees from reputable universities, as well as prior experience in international law firms or reputable chambers. They are expected to be in the top 5% of their graduating class or hold degrees from Oxbridge. Hundreds of applicants vie for just six or fewer open positions.

Working as a judicial assistant is considered to be a unique and prestigious opportunity for junior solicitors or barristers, and is viewed as a stepping stone to a successful career in law. Upon completing the position, judicial assistants typically return to private practice, working as solicitors in Magic Circle firms or barristers in top chambers. While traditionally the position of judicial assistant in Hong Kong was regarded solely as a gateway to a career at the bar, recently there has been a growing trend of law firms hiring individuals who have completed their tenure as judicial assistants, due to their valuable experiences in court proceedings.

The primary responsibilities of judicial assistants are to provide support and assistance to judges in the Court of Final Appeal. Their main role is to help judges research points of law, analyze appeals and leave applications, and draft memoranda on legal points. They also undertake a range of other tasks, such as preparing press summaries and fact summaries of appeals, as well as notes for judges’ external speaking engagements and participation in legal conferences. Additionally, judicial assistants assist in the preparation of specimen directions, case bulletins, and publications related to judicial education.

== India ==
In India law graduates go through a competitive nomination and interview process to get accepted as law clerks. The Supreme Court of India and several High Courts of India offer paid law clerkships that are considered very prestigious. These clerkships usually last for one year (session commencing from July to Mid of May) and may be extended at the discretion of individual judges.

== International Court of Justice ==
The International Court of Justice offers fixed-term clerkships through its Judicial Fellows Programme, "a highly selective program that gives recent law graduates work experience as clerks at the ICJ in The Hague." Each year, selected law schools and institutions from all over the world nominate candidates, and "only a few of the world's most outstanding legal scholars are chosen." Distinguished alumni of the Judicial Fellows Programme include international human rights lawyer Amal Clooney, United Nations Special Rapporteur on the independence of judges and lawyers Margaret Satterthwaite, and University of Cambridge Professor Sandesh Sivakumaran.

Like law clerks in many other legal institutions, Judicial Fellows work on a full-time basis under the supervision of a Member of the Court, alongside the Member's primary legal assistant. Fellows can expect to conduct research and draft memorandums on questions of law or fact relating to cases pending before the Court, attend hearings and sittings, and perform any other duties that may be assigned to them by their respective judges.

The International Court of Justice also employs Associate Legal Officers, professional staff who provide research and other legal assistance to one of the judges of the Court.

== Ireland ==
In Ireland Judicial Assistants provide support to the judiciary comparable to that provided to judges of the Federal Courts of the United States, the Courts of Australia, the European Courts in Luxembourg and Strasbourg and the Supreme Court of the United Kingdom. They are typically recent law graduates and were introduced on a gradual basis to phase out the traditional Usher/Crier or "tipstaff" position (a process that is almost complete), while simultaneously providing research assistance to the judge to whom they are assigned. Judges of all jurisdictions have Judicial Assistants, with the exception of ordinary judges of the District Court. Judicial Assistants are typically recruited on a three-year contract and take up the role for this or a shorter period of time, generally before entering/returning to practice or academia.

== Mexico ==
In Mexico, duties conferred to law clerks in some common law countries are charged in a person called "Secretario de Acuerdos" or "Secretario Proyectista", for lower courts and, "Secretario de Estudio y Cuenta" for higher court: "Suprema Corte de Justicia de la Nación". Secretario de Acuerdo's main activities are: conducting the public hearings, writing verdicts, ordering to execute sentences, and providing general assistance to Judges, while Secretario Proyectista's activities are to draft sentences.

== Netherlands ==
Law clerks of the Supreme Court of the Netherlands are independent researchers. Applicants are recruited from the top law firms and universities. For most, it is a highly prestigious second job. Law clerks typically work at the Supreme Court for six years.

In lower courts, the duties of a law clerk are generally carried out by the griffier. It is customary for the griffier to attend deliberations in the judge's chambers, to prepare the case before the hearing, as well as to draft the final verdict. They therefore have considerable influence on judgments and judicial decisions. In addition, the griffier is responsible for many of the duties of a court clerk, such as keeping records and making the minutes of court sessions. Although the role of griffier is often held by a permanent member of legal staff of the court, it is not uncommon for the role to be held by an advanced year law student, in which case they may be referred to as a buitengriffier (external clerk).

== New Zealand ==
Law clerks are referred to as judge's clerks in all four levels of the New Zealand court system. It is a fixed term position of 2 years.

In the High Court, clerks are assigned to two or three judges (including Associate Judges). In the Court of Appeal of New Zealand and the Supreme Court of New Zealand, each judge has their own clerk. The Chief Justice is the exception and has two clerks. Judges clerkships are highly sought after and competition is extremely competitive; judges' clerks often have class ranks that put them at, or near, the top of their graduating class.

== Pakistan ==
The Supreme Court of Pakistan has a competitive program for the appointment of the Law Clerks/Research Associates. Applications are invited from all over Pakistan calling on fresh law graduates, Advocates and Barristers to submit their CVs, transcripts/degrees, three letters of recommendation and a legal writing sample. Applicants thereafter are shortlisted purely on merit and interviewed eventually by the scrutiny committee, consisting of senior judges and law clerks of the Court, before final appointment. In recent years, all law clerks appointed have been licensed advocates placed at the top of their class with excellent research credentials. Law clerks sit in court during hearings. In chambers, law clerks assist the judge in making determinations of law, conducting research, critically proof-reading the court orders and preparing briefs etc. Law clerks serve as paid staff of the court for an extendable one-year term. The Supreme Court has 17 law clerks for the year 2017-2018.

In the Lahore High Court, many civil judges with master's degrees (mostly LLM) and post-graduate research experience are appointed as research associates equivalent to law clerks to the judges of the court. They function through the Research Centre of the Lahore High Court and assist all the judges in the various registry benches of the Lahore High Court.

== Philippines ==
In the Supreme Court of the Philippines and the Philippine Court of Appeals, recent law graduates and young lawyers can apply for a position as a "Court Attorney" to a Justice. This position basically corresponds to what is called a "law clerk" at the Supreme Court of the United States. Each of the 15 Supreme Court justices has 5 to 10 court attorneys at any given time. Court attorneys at the Supreme Court of the Philippines are co-terminus with their justices. Some stay for one year or less, others stay for as long as their respective justice serves the Court. Previous court attorneys have become notable Justices themselves e.g. Justice Vicente V. Mendoza, Justice Antonio Abad etc. or have gone to hold important positions in the court such as Court Administrators or Deputy Court Administrators. Many of them have gone on to successful legal practice, in business, or in the academe. The position is an extremely difficult one to get accepted to because aside from the competence requirement, there is also the character requirement that differs from one Justice to another. The position is basically a confidential one and the lawyer must enjoy the Justice's trust. Each justice has his or her own method for interviewing and appointing court attorneys.

== Poland ==
Polish law clerks are called asystenci sędziów, which can be directly translated as "judges' assistants" or "judicial assistants".

Generally their status is regulated by the Law on the System of Common Courts of July 27, 2001, but there are also assistants in the administrative courts, the Supreme Court of Poland, and the Constitutional Tribunal, where special regulations may apply. They are recruited in a competitive process with three phases: the application itself, a test of legal knowledge, and an interview. Only law graduates who are Polish citizens of good character and are above 24 years old can apply for a post in common courts. Similar requirements pertain to the administrative courts, except there is no express provision on age.

Many of the assistants with professional experience are eligible for admission to practice law. They are not to be confused with court clerks (Polish: "urzędnicy sądowi"), due to the fact that the latter do not have legal qualifications and exercise only administrative tasks, whereas assistants draft legal decisions or opinions, and conduct legal research. Judicial assistants also differ from "judicial clerks" or "court referendaries" (Polish: "referendarze sądowi") in that they possess no judicial powers, and cannot make binding legal decisions on their own. Law clerks in Poland have their own organisation called National Society of Judicial Assistants (Ogólnopolskie Stowarzyszenie Asystentów Sędziów).

=== Opinions ===
There are varying opinions on the influence of assistants on the Polish judiciary. Some scholars criticize the profession, because - in their view - judges themselves should write their own opinions, as it would positively affect the quality and length of these documents. However, prominent judges state that "a good assistant is a treasure to have" (Judge Krystian Markiewicz), while others complain that they do not need assistants who "make no unaided decisions whatsoever" (Judge Barbara Piwnik, also a former Minister of Justice). Contrary to many Western legal systems, the profession of a judicial assistant in Poland is sometimes described as "poorly paid" and "unattractive".

=== Remuneration ===
Basic salary in common courts is set by a regulation of the Minister of Justice and since June 2016 amounts from 3000 PLN to 4200 PLN per month (ca. €695 to €975 gross). In the case of administrative courts, the salary of assistants is regulated by the President of the Republic of Poland, and ranges from 1600 PLN even up to 5200 PLN, depending on whether we are dealing with a senior assistant or not. The remuneration rules at the Supreme Court of Poland and the Constitutional Tribunal are provided by respective internal regulations.

== Singapore ==
Since 1991, law graduates from the National University of Singapore, Singapore Management University, and reputable foreign universities, only those obtaining first class honours or equivalent, are invited to join the Supreme Court as Justices' Law Clerks. The Supreme Court comprises the High Court and the Court of Appeal, which is the final court of appeal in Singapore. Upon accepting appointment, Justices' Law Clerks are appointed for a term of one and a half years, with a possible 6-month extension. During their term, the law clerks are given the opportunity to work with both the judges of the High Court as well as the Judges of the Appeal and the Chief Justice. After their term, the law clerks have the option of joining the permanent establishment of the Singapore Legal Service. If they take up this option, they will be posted to other branches of the Singapore Legal Service, for example as Deputy Public Prosecutors at the Attorney's General Chambers or as Assistant Registrars in the Supreme Court Registry. Many Justices' Law Clerks choose to join private firms after their stint (and several have recently achieved the title of Senior Counsel), while others have chosen a path in academia.

== South Korea ==
See Law clerks in South Korea.

== Sweden ==
After successfully obtaining the Swedish law degree called Candidate of Law one can apply for a position as a law clerk ("notarie" in Swedish) either in the Administrative Courts (förvaltningsrätt) or in the General Courts (tingsrätt). Applicants are rated according to their accumulated points, which are calculated mainly by grades. Higher grades giving higher scores and the one with the highest score applying to any given spot is accepted. One applies to the Swedish Court Agency (Domstolsverket) about six times a year, which calculates the scores and apportions the applicants. The Courts in the bigger cities naturally tends to be most popular, thereby needing the highest scores even if they also have most law clerk positions.

The ratio is about one law clerk per judge, and the clerk switch judge after a time, usually three months. The rationale being that working for different judges broadens the scope of learning.

The term as law clerk is two years, after which the law clerk may opt to apply to the Court of Appeals in the Administrative system or the General system ("kammarrätt" or "hovrätt") and continue on the path that traditionally leads to Judge, or leave the Court system for another career. Having completed the two years is considered qualifying and may open up career opportunities otherwise closed.

The work as a law clerk mainly entails assisting the judges with writing verdicts and decisions, keeping the records during trials and conducting legal inquiries. After about six months the law clerk is trusted with deciding simpler non-disputed issues by himself (such as registering prenuptials or granting adoptions). After about a year the law clerk is entrusted with judging simpler criminal and civil law cases by himself (in General Courts), such as petty theft or a civil case involving low sums of money.

== United States ==
In the United States, judicial law clerks are usually recent law school graduates who performed at or near the top of their class and/or attended highly ranked law schools. Serving as a law clerk, especially to a U.S. federal judge, is considered to be one of the most prestigious positions in legal circles, and tends to open up wide-ranging opportunities in academia, law firm practice, and influential government work. Among the most prestigious clerkships are those with the United States Supreme Court, the United States courts of appeals, United States district courts, specialized courts such as the United States Tax Court and the United States Bankruptcy Courts, the New York State Commercial Division, Delaware Court of Chancery, and state supreme courts. Some U.S. district courts provide particularly useful experience for law clerks pursuing specific fields. The Southern District of New York deals with a heightened volume of high-profile commercial litigation, the Eastern District of Texas handles the most patent cases in the nation, the Northern District of California leads the country in antitrust suits, and the District of Columbia hears many high-profile disputes involving the federal government. Similarly, the United States Tax Court specializes in adjudicating disputes over federal income tax, the United States Bankruptcy Courts specialize in issues arising under the United States Bankruptcy Code, the New York State Commercial Division adjudicates high-profile commercial matters in an expedited fashion, and the Delaware Court of Chancery hears a substantial volume of corporate and shareholder derivative actions.

=== Qualifications ===
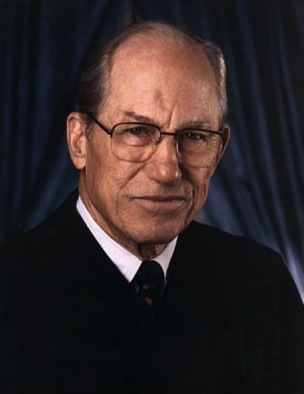
Supreme Court Justice Byron White previously served as a law clerk to Chief Justice Fred M. Vinson. Current Supreme Court Justice Neil Gorsuch served as law clerk to Justice White.

Most law clerks are recent law school graduates who performed at or near the top of their class. Federal judges, especially those at the appellate level, often require that applicants for law clerk positions have experience with law review or moot court in law school. As such, the law clerk application process is highly competitive, with most federal judges receiving hundreds of applications for only one or two open positions in any given year.

Federal appellate judges tend to recruit primarily from the most prestigious and highly-ranked law schools in the United States. Justice Clarence Thomas is the major exception to the rule; he takes pride in selecting clerks from non-top-tier schools, and publicly noted that his clerks have been attacked on the Internet as "third tier trash".

Judicial clerkships with federal or state appellate judges tend to be more competitive than those with state-level trial court judges. However, because there are many more law graduates with high academic credentials than there are clerkship positions available at any level, competition for judicial clerkships is always intense.

Because of the competitive selection criteria, many law clerks go on to become distinguished legal figures, professors, and judges later in their careers. Many Supreme Court justices previously clerked for other Supreme Court justices:

- Byron White clerked for Fred M. Vinson
- John Paul Stevens clerked for Wiley Blount Rutledge
- Stephen Breyer clerked for Arthur Goldberg
- William Rehnquist clerked for Robert H. Jackson
- John Roberts clerked for William Rehnquist
- Elena Kagan clerked for Thurgood Marshall
- Neil Gorsuch clerked for Byron White and Anthony Kennedy
- Brett Kavanaugh clerked for Anthony Kennedy
- Amy Coney Barrett clerked for Antonin Scalia
- Ketanji Brown Jackson clerked for Stephen Breyer

Neil Gorsuch is the first justice who served alongside a justice for whom he himself had once clerked. Several of the justices have also clerked in the courts of appeals. Justice Samuel Alito, for instance, clerked for the United States Court of Appeals for the Third Circuit.

In 1960, Supreme Court Justice Felix Frankfurter rejected Ruth Bader Ginsburg for a clerkship position due to her gender. She was rejected despite a strong recommendation from Albert Martin Sacks, who was a professor and later Dean of Harvard Law School. In 1948, Frankfurter had hired William Thaddeus Coleman, Jr. as a law clerk, the first African American law clerk to the U.S. Supreme Court.

Some judges seek to hire law clerks who not only have excelled academically but also share the judge's ideological orientation. However, this occurs mostly at the level of some state supreme courts and the United States Supreme Court. Law clerks can have a great deal of influence on the judges with whom they work.

Upon completing a judicial clerkship, a law clerk often becomes very marketable to elite law firms. However, some law clerks decide they enjoy the position so much they continue to serve the judge as a law clerk in a permanent capacity.

=== Federal clerkships ===
A clerkship with a federal judge is one of the most highly sought positions in the legal field. Some federal judges receive thousands of applications for a single position, and even the least sought-after federal clerkships will likely be applied to by at least one thousand candidates. Successful candidates tend to be very high in their class, with most being members of their law school's law review or other journal or moot court team. Such clerkships are generally seen as more prestigious than those with state judges.

Almost all federal judges have at least one law clerk; many have two or more. Associate Justices of the U.S. Supreme Court are allowed four clerks. Although the Chief Justice is allowed to hire five clerks, Chief Justice Rehnquist hired only three per year, and Chief Justice Roberts usually hires only four. Generally, law clerks serve a term of one to two years; however, some federal judges hire a permanent law clerk. Such judges usually have one permanent law clerk and one or two law clerks who serve on a term basis.

The most prestigious clerkship is one with a U.S. Supreme Court Justice; there are only 37 of these positions available every year. However, in recent times securing a federal court of appeals clerkship with a federal judge has been a prerequisite to clerking on the Supreme Court. Therefore, usually the second most prestigious place to clerk is at one of the U.S. courts of appeals. Clerkships with certain appellate judges, such as J. Michael Luttig, who have sent many clerks on to the Supreme Court, often called "feeder judges" are especially difficult to obtain. Luttig, before his retirement, was the leading "feeder" judge at the court of appeals level, with virtually all of his law clerks having gone on to clerk with conservative justices on the Supreme Court, a total of 40 with 33 clerking for either Justice Thomas or Justice Scalia. This reflects the increasing polarization of the court, with both liberal and conservative judges hiring clerks who reflect their ideological orientation.

Generally, the next most sought after federal clerkship is one with a United States district court judge. Some U.S. district courts are more sought after than others due to the district's popular location, for example: the Eastern and Southern Districts of New York, the Northern District of California, and the District of the District of Columbia. There are also federal clerkships with other federal judges such as U.S. magistrate judges; U.S. Tax Court judges, senior judges, and special trial judges; Bankruptcy Appellate Panel judges; and U.S. bankruptcy judges.

Former federal law clerks are often highly sought after by large law firms. Firms believe that such individuals have excellent legal research and writing skills, and a strong command of the Federal Rules of Civil Procedure and Federal Rules of Criminal Procedure. Firms are even more interested in a former law clerk if the firm generally appears before the clerk's former judge. The interest in former law clerks is seen by the fact that most large firms have a special hiring process for former clerks, and often pay such individuals large signing bonuses.

Generally, interested candidates apply for federal clerkships more than a year before the clerkship begins. The federal clerkship application process has also largely been streamlined by the National Federal Judges Law Clerk Hiring Plan and the OSCAR system, an online database in which federal judges post upcoming vacancies (although not all federal judges use this system). The National Federal Judges Law Clerk Hiring Plan sets dates for when federal judges may receive applications, and when they may contact, interview, and hire law clerks. Generally, judges begin looking at applications in the early fall, with contact and interviews happening a few weeks later. These dates only apply to the hiring of matriculating third-year law students; practicing attorneys may apply earlier. Moreover, while many judges adhere to the National Federal Judges Law Clerk Hiring Plan's schedule, many do not follow the plan and interview and hire law students over the summer. The Supreme Court does not follow this timetable.

As a result of the extreme competition—both by the judges to get the best candidates and by candidates to get the best clerkships—the pace of the hiring is extremely quick. It is not unknown for federal judges to offer a candidate a clerkship on the spot at the conclusion of a first interview.

Judicial law fellows, pro bono attorneys (or clerks or counsel) and volunteer clerks, perform substantially the same tasks as normal judicial law clerks do, but for no pay, reduced pay or a stipend.

The Administrative Law Judges of some federal agencies - such as the U.S. International Trade Commission, the Federal Trade Commission, the United States Patent and Trademark Office, the Federal Communications Commission, the Social Security Administration, the Department of Justice, the Securities and Exchange Commission, the Veterans Administration, the Department of Transportation, the Environmental Protection Agency, the U.S. Department of Health and Human Services and the U.S. Department of Housing and Urban Development - may hire Attorney Advisors that perform judicial law clerk duties for them, such as researching the most current case law, writing and editing opinions and orders and assisting the Administrative Law Judges with trial-like adjudications, hearings and other similar procedures.

Some scholars and practitioners have questioned the lack of a federal congressional clerkship program. One study found that few top law school graduates have or will take seriously the process of being a legislative aide to gain practical skills after graduation. Instead, recent law school graduates opt for judicial clerkships leaving few in the legal field with practical legislative experience.

The U.S. Judicial Conference Committee on Codes of Conduct issued the ethical guidance, on September 12, 2024, that law clerks should be restricted by federal judges from seeking employment with political organizations while employed by the court system, "to avoid the risk of compromising the judiciary's independence".

=== State clerkships ===
Judicial clerkships in state appellate courts are similar to those in federal appellate courts, but are primarily focused on state law rather than on federal law issues. State supreme courts began using law clerks as early as the 1930s. Some state courts also use the title "staff attorney" for career clerks and clerks that support all judges. For law students who wish to practice in a specific state or geographic region after clerking, state appellate-level or trial court clerkships can often be more valuable than federal clerkships in terms of getting to know the judges, lawyers, and firms in that area, as well as in terms of seeing trial lawyers at work.

=== History ===
Although Justice Horace Gray was the first federal judge (and hence the first Supreme Court justice) to hire law clerks in 1882, according to historian James Chace, Oliver Wendell Holmes Jr. and Louis Brandeis were the first Supreme Court justices to use recent law school graduates as clerks, rather than hiring a "stenographer-secretary". As a law professor at Harvard, Felix Frankfurter selected law clerks for Justices Holmes and Brandeis. Brandeis' practices in how to train and use his clerks at the court professionalized clerkships.

=== Exceptions ===
The Supreme Court of California and the various districts of the California Courts of Appeal have generally avoided using law clerks since the late 1980s.

Instead, California has largely switched to using permanent staff attorneys at all levels of the judiciary; a few judges do use law clerks, but they are quite rare. For example, the Supreme Court of California has over 85 staff attorneys, of whom about half are attached to particular justices and the rest are shared as a central staff. The California system has been heavily criticized for denying young attorneys the chance to gain experience, and low turnover has resulted in a lack of ethnic and gender diversity among the staff attorneys. But most California judges prefer staff attorneys because it reduces the problem of having to bring new law clerks up to speed on pending complex cases, particularly those involving the death penalty.
