= Longueuil—Saint-Hubert =

Federal electoral district in Quebec, Canada

Coordinates: 45°32′30″N 73°26′30″W

Quebec electoral district
- Interactive map of riding boundaries from the 2015 federal election

Federal electoral district
- Legislature: House of Commons
MP
Natilien Joseph
Liberal
- District created: 1952
- First contested: 1953
- Last contested: 2021
- District webpage: profile, map

Demographics
- Population (2016): 108,703
- Electors (2019): 87,113
- Area (km²): 56
- Pop. density (per km²): 1,941.1
- Census division: South Shore
- Census subdivision: Longueuil (part)

Longueuil—Saint-Hubert (formerly Longueuil—Pierre-Boucher and Longueuil) is a federal electoral district in Quebec, Canada, represented in the House of Commons of Canada since 2015.

== Geography ==
This South Shore district in the Quebec region of Montérégie includes the eastern part of the City of Longueuil.

The neighbouring ridings are Longueuil—Charles-LeMoyne, Montarville, Pierre-Boucher—Les Patriotes—Verchères, La Pointe-de-l'Île, and Hochelaga.

== Profile ==
This mainly Francophone riding was one of the NDP's stronger seats on the South Shore in 2011. The NDP did well across the district, with the BQ coming in distant second for the most part. The Liberals and Conservatives did poorly in this riding, although the Liberals had a tiny pocket of somewhat strong support around Parc Michel-Chartrand. Despite winning the riding again in 2015, it was an extremely close contest. The Liberals surged into second place, just one point away from defeating the incumbent NDP candidate.

== Demographics ==
According to the 2016 Canadian census

- Twenty most common mother tongue languages (2016) : 83.5% French, 3.5% English, 3.1% Spanish, 2.1% Arabic, 1.0% Creole languages, 0.7% Romanian, 0.6% Farsi, 0.5% Portuguese, 0.5% Italian, 0.5% Russian, 0.5% Vietnamese, 0.4% Mandarin, 0.3% Kabyle, 0.2% Cantonese, 0.2% Greek, 0.1% Polish, 0.1% Ukrainian, 0.1% Bulgarian, 0.1% German, 0.1% Lao, 0.1% Wolof

== History ==
The electoral district was created as "Longueuil" in 1952 from parts of Chambly—Rouville and Châteauguay—Huntingdon—Laprairie ridings. It was renamed "Longueuil—Pierre-Boucher" in 2004.

This riding was largely replaced with "Longueuil—Saint-Hubert", losing territory to Pierre-Boucher—Les Patriotes—Verchères and gaining territory from Saint-Bruno—Saint-Hubert during the 2012 electoral redistribution.

=== Members of Parliament ===
This riding has elected the following members of Parliament:

Parliament	Years	Member	Party
Longueuil; Riding created from Chambly—Rouville and Châteauguay—Huntingdon—Laprairie
22nd	1953–1957	Auguste Vincent	Liberal
23rd	1957–1958	Auguste Vincent	Liberal
24th	1958–1962	Pierre Sévigny	Progressive Conservative
25th	1962–1963	Pierre Sévigny	Progressive Conservative
26th	1963–1965	Jean-Pierre Côté	Liberal
27th	1965–1968	Jean-Pierre Côté	Liberal
28th	1968–1972	Jean-Pierre Côté	Liberal
29th	1972–1974	Jacques Olivier	Liberal
30th	1974–1979	Jacques Olivier	Liberal
31st	1979–1980	Jacques Olivier	Liberal
32nd	1980–1984	Jacques Olivier	Liberal
33rd	1984–1988	Nic Leblanc	Progressive Conservative
34th	1988–1990	Nic Leblanc	Progressive Conservative
34th	1990–1993	Nic Leblanc	Bloc Québécois
35th	1993–1997	Nic Leblanc	Bloc Québécois
35th	1997–1997	Nic Leblanc	Independent sovereigntist
36th	1997–2000	Caroline St-Hilaire	Bloc Québécois
37th	2000–2004	Caroline St-Hilaire	Bloc Québécois
Longueuil—Pierre-Boucher
38th	2004–2006	Caroline St-Hilaire	Bloc Québécois
39th	2006–2008	Caroline St-Hilaire	Bloc Québécois
40th	2008–2011	Jean Dorion	Bloc Québécois
41st	2011–2015	Pierre Nantel	New Democratic
Longueuil—Saint-Hubert
42nd	2015–2019	Pierre Nantel	New Democratic
42nd	2019–2019	Pierre Nantel	Independent
43rd	2019–2021	Denis Trudel	Bloc Québécois
44th	2021–2025	Denis Trudel	Bloc Québécois
45th	2025–present	Natilien Joseph	Liberal

== Election results ==
=== Longueuil—Saint-Hubert, 2015–present ===
2025 Canadian federal election
Party	Candidate	Votes	%	±%	Expenditures
Liberal	Natilien Joseph	24,237	40.98	+2.66	
Bloc Québécois	Denis Trudel	23,468	39.68	-1.52	
Conservative	Martine Boucher	8,447	14.28	+7.35	
New Democratic	Nesrine Benhadj	2,986	5.05	-2.90	
Total valid votes/expense limit		59,138	98.06		
Total rejected ballots		1,172	1.94		
Turnout		60,310	69.74		
Eligible voters		86,474			
Liberal gain from Bloc Québécois		Swing		+2.09	
Source: Elections Canada
Note: number of eligible voters does not include voting day registrations.

2021 Canadian federal election
Party	Candidate	Votes	%	±%	Expenditures
Bloc Québécois	Denis Trudel	23,579	41.2	+2.7	$37,733.06
Liberal	Florence Gagnon	21,930	38.3	+4.1	$55,578.41
New Democratic	Mildred Murray	4,553	8.0	-0.5	$51.02
Conservative	Boukare Tall	3,964	6.9	+0.6	$681.23
Green	Simon King	1,599	2.8	-8.5	$8,865.56
People's	Manon Girard	1,358	2.4	+1.6	$0.00
Indépendance du Québec	Jacinthe Lafrenaye	252	0.4	N/A	$0.00
Total valid votes/expense limit		57,235	98.0	–	$115,690.00
Total rejected ballots		1,144	2.0		
Turnout		58,379	67.6		
Registered voters		86,352			
Bloc Québécois hold		Swing		-0.7	
Source: Elections Canada

2019 Canadian federal election
Party	Candidate	Votes	%	±%	Expenditures
Bloc Québécois	Denis Trudel	23,061	38.5	+11.23	$46,039.85
Liberal	Réjean Hébert	20,471	34.2	+4.19	$77,307.46
Green	Pierre Nantel	6,745	11.3	+8.81	$16,474.78
New Democratic	Éric Ferland	5,104	8.5	–22.72	$11,119.46
Conservative	Patrick Clune	3,779	6.3	–2.44	none listed
People's	Ellen Comeau	467	0.8	–	$0.00
Independent	Pierre-Luc Fillon	217	0.4	–	$0.00
Total valid votes/expense limit		59,844	100.0		
Total rejected ballots		1,086			
Turnout		60,930	69.9		
Eligible voters		87,113			
Bloc Québécois gain from Independent		Swing		–	
Source: Elections Canada
Note: Pierre Nantel was the incumbent MP who was elected in 2015 as a New Democrat, but sat as an independent after August 16, 2019. Nantel decided to run again as the Green candidate in the 2019 election, but never joined the Green caucus while the 42nd Parliament was in session.

2015 Canadian federal election
Party	Candidate	Votes	%	±%	Expenditures
New Democratic	Pierre Nantel	18,171	31.22	-18.79	$41,956.98
Liberal	Michael O'Grady	17,468	30.01	+19.92	–
Bloc Québécois	Denis Trudel	15,873	27.27	-1.52	–
Conservative	John Sedlak	5,087	8.74	±0.00	$6,341.70
Green	Casandra Poitras	1,447	2.49	+0.29	–
Strength in Democracy	Affine Lwalalika	153	0.26	–	–
Total valid votes/Expense limit		58,199	100.00		$224,513.21
Total rejected ballots		939	1.59	–	
Turnout		85,766	68.95	–	
Eligible voters		85,766			
New Democratic hold		Swing		-19.36	
Source: Elections Canada

2011 federal election redistributed results
Party	Vote	%
New Democratic	26,335	50.02
Bloc Québécois	15,162	28.80
Liberal	5,313	10.09
Conservative	4,602	8.74
Green	1,156	2.20
Others	86	0.16

=== Longueuil—Pierre-Boucher, 2004–2015 ===
2011 Canadian federal election
Party	Candidate	Votes	%	±%	Expenditures
New Democratic	Pierre Nantel	27,119	51.93	+37.9	
Bloc Québécois	Jean Dorion	14,181	27.16	-18.9	
Liberal	Kévan Falsafi	5,321	10.19	-11.6	
Conservative	Richard Bélisle	4,339	8.31	-6.1	
Green	Valérie St-Amant	1,032	1.98	-1.5	
Marxist–Leninist	Serge Patenaude	228	0.44	+0.2	
Total valid votes/Expense limit		52,220	100.00		
Total rejected ballots		650	1.23	-0.11	
Turnout		52,870	67.24	–	
Eligible voters		78,629	–	–	
New Democratic gain from Bloc Québécois		Swing		+28.4	

2008 Canadian federal election
Party	Candidate	Votes	%	±%	Expenditures
Bloc Québécois	Jean Dorion	23,118	46.1	-9.1	$49,818
Liberal	Ryan Hillier	10,920	21.8	+9.2	$10,797
Conservative	Jacques Bouchard	7,210	14.4	-4.4	$55,552
New Democratic	Lise St-Denis	7,021	14.0	+5.4	$1,131
Green	Danielle Moreau	1,752	3.5	-0.5	
Marxist–Leninist	Serge Patenaude	103	0.2	–	
Total valid votes/Expense limit		50,124	100.0	$83,504	
Total rejected ballots		682	1.34		
Turnout		50,806			

2006 Canadian federal election
Party	Candidate	Votes	%	±%	Expenditures
Bloc Québécois	Caroline St-Hilaire	27,425	55.2	-5.7	$50,372
Conservative	Sebastien Legris	9,331	18.8	+13.9	$5,118
Liberal	Lancine Diawara	6,260	12.6	-13.0	$8,387
New Democratic	Philippe Haese	4,273	8.6	+3.4	$1,615
Green	Adam Sommerfeld	1,995	4.0	+1.4	
Marijuana	David Fiset	397	0.8	0.0	
Total valid votes/Expense limit		49,681	100.0	$78,130	

=== Longueuil, 1952–2004 ===
2004 Canadian federal election
Party	Candidate	Votes	%	±%	Expenditures
Bloc Québécois	Caroline St-Hilaire	29,473	60.9	+8.7	$75,548
Liberal	Robert Gladu	12,363	25.6	-7.0	$61,710
New Democratic	Nicole Fournier-Sylvester	2,512	5.2	+3.6	$572
Conservative	Richard Bélisle	2,354	4.9	-5.8	$9,041
Green	Michel Bédard	1,263	2.6	–	
Marijuana	David Fiset	401	0.8	-1.6	
Total valid votes/Expense limit		48,366	100.0	$77,195	

Note: Conservative vote is compared to the total of the Canadian Alliance vote and Progressive Conservative vote in the 2000 election.

2000 Canadian federal election
Party	Candidate	Votes	%	±%
Bloc Québécois	Caroline St-Hilaire	20,868	52.2	+2.1
Liberal	Sophie Joncas	12,991	32.5	+3.3
Progressive Conservative	Richard Lafleur	2,210	5.5	-13.0
Alliance	Michel Minguy	2,066	5.2	
Marijuana	David Fiset	968	2.4	
New Democratic	Timothy Spurr	655	1.6	-0.4
Marxist–Leninist	Stephane Chénier	183	0.5	
Total valid votes		39,941	100.0	

1997 Canadian federal election
Party	Candidate	Votes	%	±%
Bloc Québécois	Caroline St-Hilaire	20,977	50.1	-15.6
Liberal	Carole Marcil	12,247	29.3	+4.5
Progressive Conservative	François Leduc	7,773	18.6	+11.1
New Democratic	Maurice Auzat	857	2.0	+0.4
Total valid votes		41,854	100.0	

1993 Canadian federal election
Party	Candidate	Votes	%	±%
Bloc Québécois	Nic Leblanc	39,734	65.7	
Liberal	Guy Chartrand	14,955	24.7	+2.1
Progressive Conservative	Richard Ledoux	4,512	7.5	-45.8
New Democratic	Sergio Martinez	985	1.6	-18.0
Commonwealth of Canada	Dany Lépine	262	0.4	+0.1
Total valid votes		60,448	100.0	

1988 Canadian federal election
Party	Candidate	Votes	%	±%
Progressive Conservative	Nic Leblanc	29,054	53.3	+5.5
Liberal	Michel Dupuy	12,328	22.6	-9.8
New Democratic	Daniel Senez	10,681	19.6	+9.0
Rhinoceros	Sylvie Legs Legault	2,080	3.8	-0.3
Independent	Serge Lachapelle	233	0.4	
Commonwealth of Canada	Louis Dubé	163	0.3	+0.2
Total valid votes		54,539	100.0	

1984 Canadian federal election
Party	Candidate	Votes	%	±%
Progressive Conservative	Nic Leblanc	28,956	47.7	+40.6
Liberal	Jacques Olivier	19,654	32.4	-36.6
New Democratic	Claire Gagnon	6,401	10.6	-2.4
Parti nationaliste	Denise Imbeau	3,054	5.0	
Rhinoceros	Robert Millet-Lynch dit Bagno	2,523	4.2	
Commonwealth of Canada	André Rouillard	73	0.1	
Total valid votes		60,661	100.0	

1980 Canadian federal election
Party	Candidate	Votes	%	±%
Liberal	Jacques Olivier	32,755	69.0	+7.7
New Democratic	Jean-Pierre Vaillancourt	6,144	12.9	+5.8
Progressive Conservative	Hélène Vaillancourt	3,383	7.1	-3.5
Rhinoceros	Jean-Marc Cornélius Brunet	2,631	5.5	+1.0
Social Credit	Joseph Roland Grandmaison	1,688	3.6	-11.1
Union populaire	Denise Imbeau-Cousineau	362	0.8	-0.6
Independent	Alain Saulnier	204	0.4	
Independent	Walter Lee Belyea	164	0.3	
Marxist–Leninist	Yves Boyer	92	0.2	-0.1
Communist	Hervé Fuyet	73	0.2	
Total valid votes		47,496	100.0	

1979 Canadian federal election
Party	Candidate	Votes	%	±%
Liberal	Jacques Olivier	34,207	61.3	+9.5
Social Credit	Robert S. Daoust	8,173	14.6	-1.2
Progressive Conservative	Georges Perrier	5,952	10.7	-5.5
New Democratic	Jean-Pierre Vaillancourt	3,995	7.2	-5.6
Rhinoceros	Simonne Monet Chartrand	2,556	4.6	
Union populaire	Louis Denoncourt	764	1.4	
Marxist–Leninist	Yves Boyer	176	0.3	-0.4
Total valid votes		55,823	100.0	

1974 Canadian federal election
Party	Candidate	Votes	%	±%
Liberal	Jacques Olivier	24,500	51.8	+7.2
Progressive Conservative	Noël Joanisse	7,627	16.1	+2.0
Social Credit	Fernand Bouffard	7,490	15.8	-8.5
New Democratic	Henri-François Gautrin	6,042	12.8	+3.6
Independent	Jacques Ferron	1,110	2.3	
Marxist–Leninist	Paul Lévesque	357	0.8	
Independent	G. Bed Valade	163	0.3	
Total valid votes		47,289	100.0	

1972 Canadian federal election
Party	Candidate	Votes	%	±%
Liberal	Jacques Olivier	22,129	44.6	-16.1
Social Credit	Emile-A. Vadeboncoeur	12,091	24.4	+18.0
Progressive Conservative	Marcel Robidas	7,015	14.1	-3.2
New Democratic	Robert Mansour	4,548	9.2	-4.4
Independent	Jacques Gendron	2,020	4.1	
Independent	Raoul Wéziwézô Duguay	1,625	3.3	
Independent	André Pesant	170	0.3	
Total valid votes		49,598	100.0	

Note: Social Credit vote is compared to Ralliement créditiste vote in the 1968 election.

1968 Canadian federal election
Party	Candidate	Votes	%	±%
Liberal	Jean-Pierre Coté	19,080	60.7	+4.7
Progressive Conservative	Raymond-J. Bériault	5,448	17.3	+3.6
New Democratic	Paul Ferron	4,254	13.5	-2.6
Ralliement créditiste	Joseph-A. Chénier	2,023	6.4	-7.7
Rhinoceros	Robert Charlebois	354	1.1	
Independent PC	Gaston Prévost	281	0.9	
Total valid votes		31,440	100.0	

1965 Canadian federal election
Party	Candidate	Votes	%	±%
Liberal	Jean-Pierre Coté	21,578	56.0	+15.4
New Democratic	Jeanne d'Arc Morin	6,214	16.1	+8.6
Ralliement créditiste	Joseph-A. Chénier	5,456	14.2	-4.1
Progressive Conservative	Rosaire Clavette	5,286	13.7	-19.9
Total valid votes		38,534	100.0	

Note: Ralliement créditiste vote is compared to Social Credit vote in the 1963 election.

1963 Canadian federal election
Party	Candidate	Votes	%	±%
Liberal	Jean-Pierre Coté	17,223	40.6	+3.6
Progressive Conservative	Pierre Sévigny	14,269	33.6	-10.6
Social Credit	Bruno Camirand	7,735	18.2	+7.7
New Democratic	Gérard Philipps	3,208	7.6	+1.2
Total valid votes		42,435	100.0	

1962 Canadian federal election
Party	Candidate	Votes	%	±%
Progressive Conservative	Pierre Sévigny	17,578	44.3	-5.6
Liberal	Auguste Vincent	14,686	37.0	-6.4
Social Credit	Adolphe Martin	4,186	10.5	
New Democratic	Réginald Lauzier	2,518	6.3	-0.4
Independent PC	Roch Ste-Marie	381	1.0	
Independent Liberal	Oliva Bédard	358	0.9	
Total valid votes		39,707	100.0	

Note: New Democratic Party vote is compared to Co-operative Commonwealth Federation vote in the 1958 election.

1958 Canadian federal election
Party	Candidate	Votes	%	±%
Progressive Conservative	Pierre Sévigny	18,637	49.8	+16.5
Liberal	Auguste Vincent	16,238	43.4	-15.5
Co-operative Commonwealth	Jacques Ferron	2,529	6.8	+1.4
Total valid votes		37,404	100.0	

1957 Canadian federal election
Party	Candidate	Votes	%	±%
Liberal	Auguste Vincent	19,314	58.9	-8.7
Progressive Conservative	Pierre Sévigny	10,942	33.4	+13.5
Co-operative Commonwealth	Michel Chartrand	1,768	5.4	-5.7
Independent PC	Oliva Bédard	782	2.4	
Total valid votes		32,806	100.0	

1953 Canadian federal election
Party	Candidate	Votes	%
Liberal	Auguste Vincent	16,688	67.6
Progressive Conservative	Georges-Joseph Valade	4,912	19.9
Co-operative Commonwealth	Michel Chartrand	2,742	11.1
Labor–Progressive	Yvonne Bourget	352	1.4
Total valid votes		24,694	100.0

== See also ==
- List of Canadian electoral districts
- Historical federal electoral districts of Canada
