= Jean-Pierre Côté =

Canadian politician

The Honourable Jean-Pierre Côté PC OC
- Official 1968 portrait

23rd Lieutenant Governor of Quebec
- In office April 27, 1978 – March 28, 1984
- Monarch: Elizabeth II
- Governors General: Jules Léger; Edward Schreyer
- Premier: René Lévesque
- Preceded by: Hugues Lapointe
- Succeeded by: Gilles Lamontagne

Senator for Kennebec, Quebec
- In office September 1, 1972 – April 27, 1978
- Preceded by: Cyrille Vaillancourt
- Succeeded by: Claude Wagner

Member of the Canadian Parliament for Longueuil
- In office April 8, 1963 – October 30, 1972
- Preceded by: Pierre Sévigny
- Succeeded by: Jacques Olivier

Personal details
- Born: Joseph Julien Jean-Pierre Côté; January 9, 1926 Montreal, Quebec
- Died: July 10, 2002 (aged 76) Montreal, Quebec
- Party: Liberal
- Cabinet: Postmaster General (1965–1968); Minister of National Revenue (1968–1970); Minister Without Portfolio (1970–1971); Postmaster General (1971–1972); Minister of Communications (Acting) (1971)

Joseph Julien Jean-Pierre Côté PC OC (January 9, 1926 – July 10, 2002) was a Canadian parliamentarian and the 23rd Lieutenant Governor of Quebec.

== Early life ==
Born in Montreal, Quebec, the son of Émile Côté and Cédia Roy, he studied to be a dental technician at the École technique de denturologie in Montreal.

== Member of Parliament ==
In the 1963 federal elections, he was elected in the riding of Longueuil as the Liberal candidate. He was re-elected in 1965 and 1968. He held quite a few ministerial positions including Postmaster General, Minister of National Revenue, Minister without Portfolio, and Minister of Communications (Acting). He did not run for re-election in 1972.

== Senate of Canada ==
In 1972, he was appointed to the senate representing the senatorial division of Kennebec, Quebec. He resigned in 1978.

== Lieutenant Governor of Quebec ==
In 1978, he was appointed Lieutenant Governor of Quebec. He served until 1984.

== Family ==
On July 31, 1948, he married Marie Anne Germaine Tremblay (17 September 1922 - 31 January 2011). They had eight children together: Andrée, Gilbert, Danielle, Robert, Paul, Hélène, Jocelyne, Isabelle.

== Honours ==
- He was sworn in as a Member of the Queen's Privy Council for Canada on 18 December 1965. This gave him the right to the honorific prefix "The Honourable" and the post nominal letters "PC" for life.
- In 1992, he was made an Officer of the Order of Canada giving him the post nominal letters "OC".
- In 2002 he was given the Canadian version of the Queen Elizabeth II Golden Jubilee Medal.

== Artist ==
He was also an accomplished landscape painter. His paintings are quite sought after.
