= Denis Trudel =

Canadian politician (born 1963)

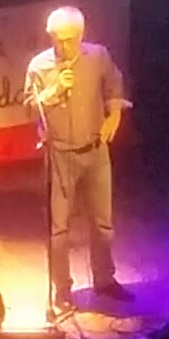

Member of Parliament for Longueuil—Saint-Hubert
- In office October 21, 2019 – March 23, 2025
- Preceded by: Pierre Nantel
- Succeeded by: Natilien Joseph

Personal details
- Born: July 18, 1963 (age 63)
- Party: Bloc Québécois
- Occupation: Politician

Denis Trudel (French pronunciation: [dəni tʁydɛl]; born July 18, 1963) is a Canadian politician and former actor who was elected to the House of Commons of Canada in the 2019 election in the riding of Longueuil—Saint-Hubert as a member of the Bloc Québécois (BQ).

== Political career ==
From 2021 to 2025 he had served as the critic of social solidarity and the French language in the Bloc Québécois Shadow Cabinet.

== Electoral record ==
2025 Canadian federal election: Longueuil—Saint-Hubert
Party	Candidate	Votes	%	±%	Expenditures
Liberal	Natilien Joseph	24,237	40.98	+2.66	$53,846.59
Bloc Québécois	Denis Trudel	23,468	39.68	–1.52	$48,617.72
Conservative	Martine Boucher	8,447	14.28	+7.35	$1,979.16
New Democratic	Nesrine Benhadj	2,986	5.05	–2.90	$282.00
Total valid votes/expense limit		59,138	98.06	–	$132,692.62
Total rejected ballots		1,172	1.94		
Turnout		60,310	69.74		
Eligible voters		86,474			
Liberal gain from Bloc Québécois		Swing		+2.09	
Source: Elections Canada
Note: number of eligible voters does not include voting day registrations.

2021 Canadian federal election: Longueuil—Saint-Hubert
Party	Candidate	Votes	%	±%	Expenditures
Bloc Québécois	Denis Trudel	23,579	41.2	+2.7	$37,733.06
Liberal	Florence Gagnon	21,930	38.3	+4.1	$55,578.41
New Democratic	Mildred Murray	4,553	8.0	-0.5	$51.02
Conservative	Boukare Tall	3,964	6.9	+0.6	$681.23
Green	Simon King	1,599	2.8	-8.5	$8,865.56
People's	Manon Girard	1,358	2.4	+1.6	$0.00
Indépendance du Québec	Jacinthe Lafrenaye	252	0.4	N/A	$0.00
Total valid votes/expense limit		57,235	98.0	–	$115,690.00
Total rejected ballots		1,144	2.0		
Turnout		58,379	67.6		
Registered voters		86,352			
Bloc Québécois hold		Swing		-0.7	
Source: Elections Canada

2019 Canadian federal election: Longueuil—Saint-Hubert
Party	Candidate	Votes	%	±%	Expenditures
Bloc Québécois	Denis Trudel	23,061	38.5	+11.23	$46,039.85
Liberal	Réjean Hébert	20,471	34.2	+4.19	$77,307.46
Green	Pierre Nantel	6,745	11.3	+8.81	$16,474.78
New Democratic	Éric Ferland	5,104	8.5	–22.72	$11,119.46
Conservative	Patrick Clune	3,779	6.3	–2.44	none listed
People's	Ellen Comeau	467	0.8	–	$0.00
Independent	Pierre-Luc Fillon	217	0.4	–	$0.00
Total valid votes/expense limit		59,844	100.0		
Total rejected ballots		1,086			
Turnout		60,930	69.9		
Eligible voters		87,113			
Bloc Québécois gain from Independent		Swing		–	
Source: Elections Canada
Note: Pierre Nantel was the incumbent MP who was elected in 2015 as a New Democrat, but sat as an independent after August 16, 2019. Nantel decided to run again as the Green candidate in the 2019 election, but never joined the Green caucus while the 42nd Parliament was in session.

== Filmography ==
=== Cinema ===
- 1987 : Le Diable à quatre
- 1989 : How to Make Love to a Negro Without Getting Tired (Comment faire l’amour avec un nègre sans se fatiguer) : pusher #3
- 1990 : The Party (Le Party) : nurse
- 1994 : Octobre : felquist
- 1998 : 2 Seconds (2 secondes) : buyer
- 2000 : The Left-Hand Side of the Fridge (La Moitié gauche du frigo) : worker #2 DNR Systems
- 2001 : February 15, 1839 (15 février 1839) : Jacques Yelle
- 2001 : Tar Angel (L'Ange de goudron)
- 2002 : Savage Messiah (Moïse : L'Affaire Roch Thériault) : Alphonse
- 2002 : S.P.C.E. : policeman
- 2003 : Les Immortels : Denis
- 2004 : Happy Camper (Camping sauvage) : Richard
- 2005 : C.R.A.Z.Y. : uncle Georges
- 2005 : Audition (L'Audition) : father in the parc
- 2007 : La Lâcheté : Conrad Tremblay
- 2007 : Bluff : police officer
- 2008 : The Deserter (Le Déserteur) : Georges Larochelle
- 2009 : The Timekeeper (L'Heure de vérité)
- 2011 : La Vérité : Denis
- 2012 : Ésimésac : Hubert

=== Television ===
- 1993 : Les grands procès : Jean-Marie Ruest
- 1997 : Cher Olivier : Gilles Latulippe
- 1998 : Réseaux : Raoul Simard
- 1998 : Mais où se cache Carmen Sandiego ?
- 2000 : Chartrand et Simonne : Joachim Cornellier
- 2001 : La Vie, la vie : Didier
- 2002 : Fortier : Denis Laflamme
- 2002 : Tag - Épilogue : Xavier
- 2002 : Tabou : Mathias
- 2002 : Lance et compte : Nouvelle Génération : journalist
- 2002 : Bunker, le cirque : Yvon Gagné
- 2003-2005 : Watatatow : Éric Bouliane
- 2004 : Smash : Gilles Jetté
- 2005 : Au nom de la loi : Guimond
- 2006 : Casino : Albert Tremblay
- 2007 : Destinées : Gaétan Pellerin
- 2011-2015 : 19-2 : Belinski
- 2017-2019 : Victor Lessard : Paul Delaney
- 2019 : La Faille : Robert Fournier
