= Jacques Olivier =

Canadian politician

The Honourable Jacques Olivier PC

29th Mayor of Longueuil
- In office 2001–2005
- Preceded by: Claude Gladu
- Succeeded by: Claude Gladu

Member of the Canadian Parliament for Longueuil
- In office 1972–1984
- Preceded by: Jean-Pierre Côté
- Succeeded by: Nic Leblanc

Personal details
- Born: April 14, 1944 (age 82) Hull, Quebec, Canada
- Party: Liberal; Parti municipal Rive-Sud–Équipe Olivier
- Profession: Businessman

Joseph Mario Jacques Olivier, PC (born 14 April 1944) is a Canadian politician, businessman and labour leader. He was mayor of Longueuil, Quebec, from 2001 until 2005 and is a former Member of Parliament.

== Background and early career ==
A hospital worker in his youth, Olivier was elected president of the trade union local at Charles-LeMoyne Hospital and treasurer of Quebec's National Federation of Hospital Employees. In 1970, Prime Minister Pierre Trudeau appointed Olivier as an aide to the Canadian Cabinet on labour relations.

== Election to Federal Parliament and Federal political role ==
In the 1972 election, Olivier was elected to the House of Commons of Canada as the Liberal Member of Parliament for the riding of Longueuil. He served as parliamentary secretary to the Minister of Labour from 1976 to 1978.

Following the 1980 election, Olivier was elected chair of the Liberal Party's Quebec caucus. In January 1984, Trudeau appointed Olivier to the Cabinet as Minister of State for fitness and amateur sport. Olivier was dropped from Cabinet in June when John Turner became the new prime minister. He was defeated in the subsequent 1984 election.

== Business associations ==
Following his defeat, Olivier established a Ford dealership in Saint-Hubert, Quebec, and soon joined the board of directors of the Corporation des concessionnaires automobiles du Grand Montréal et du Québec.

== Longueuil municipal politics ==
In 1987, he ran to be mayor of Longueuil, but was defeated. He was elected mayor of the Montreal suburb in 2001, and serves as vice-chairman of the executive committee of the Montreal Metropolitan Community. During the Quebec municipal restructuring of 2002, Olivier became Mayor of the new Mega-city of Longueuil, which merged the former cities of Longueuil, Boucherville, Brossard and Saint-Lambert; towns of Greenfield Park, LeMoyne, Saint-Bruno-de-Montarville and Saint-Hubert. This merger was partially reversed after municipal referendums and was seen by many to be a failure on Olivier's part to sell the new Mega-City. Olivier led his own municipal political party, équipe Olivier, which held a large majority on Longueuil's city council.

Olivier did not run in the 2005 municipal election and was succeeded as mayor by Claude Gladu.

== Electoral record (incomplete) ==
1972 Canadian federal election: Longueuil
Party	Candidate	Votes	%	±%
Liberal	Jacques Olivier	22,129	44.62	
Social Credit	Emile-A. Vadeboncoeur	12,091	24.38	
Progressive Conservative	Marcel Robidas	7,015	14.14	
New Democratic	Robert Mansour	4,548	9.17	
Independent	Jacques Gendron	2,020	4.07	
Non-Affiliated	Raôul Wéziwézô Duguay	1,625	3.28	
Marxist–Leninist	André Pesant	170	0.34	
Total valid votes		49,598	100.00	
Total rejected ballots		2,977		
Turnout		52,575	72.56	
Electors on the lists		72,458		
Source: Official Voting Results, Office of the Chief Electoral Officer (Canada), 1972.
