= Natilien Joseph =

Canadian politician

Natilien Joseph MP

Member of Parliament for Longueuil—Saint-Hubert
- Incumbent
- Assumed office April 28, 2025
- Preceded by: Denis Trudel

Personal details
- Born: Haiti
- Party: Liberal
- Website: natilienjoseph.liberal.ca

Natilien Joseph MP is a Canadian politician from the Liberal Party of Canada. He was elected Member of Parliament for Longueuil—Saint-Hubert in the 2025 Canadian federal election.

At the time of the 2025 Canadian federal election, he lived in Saint-Hubert, Quebec.

== Electoral record ==
2025 Canadian federal election: Longueuil—Saint-Hubert
Party	Candidate	Votes	%	±%	Expenditures
Liberal	Natilien Joseph	24,237	40.98	+2.66	$53,846.59
Bloc Québécois	Denis Trudel	23,468	39.68	–1.52	$48,617.72
Conservative	Martine Boucher	8,447	14.28	+7.35	$1,979.16
New Democratic	Nesrine Benhadj	2,986	5.05	–2.90	$282.00
Total valid votes/expense limit		59,138	98.06	–	$132,692.62
Total rejected ballots		1,172	1.94		
Turnout		60,310	69.74		
Eligible voters		86,474			
Liberal gain from Bloc Québécois		Swing		+2.09	
Source: Elections Canada
Note: number of eligible voters does not include voting day registrations.

== Instagram Controversy ==
In the weeks leading up to the 2025 election, Joseph's official Instagram page @natilien_josephofficiel was discovered to be following around 1000 accounts with explicit sexual content. 20 days before the election, an April 8 post on Facebook page L'Actualité en mèmes showed an image of Joseph on a background of such followed pages with the caption "I didn't have time to show up for the debate against (incumbent Bloc Québecois candidate) Denis Trudel, I was busy," referencing Joseph's last minute withdrawal from a radio debate on radio FM 103,3, claiming a scheduling conflict, despite having agreed in advance to the themes, conventions and scheduling. In the end, Trudel was the only candidate who showed up for the radio debate.

The next day, April 9, 2025, Le Courier du Sud reported that more than 900 accounts had been unfollowed during the night. When reached for comment, Joseph claimed this account had been hacked, and that his team was investigating the incident.

On April 10, 98.5 FM radio program Lagacé le matin cast doubt on Joseph's statement his Instagram page has been hacked and mocked the candidate's lack of discretion in not separating his political aspirations and personal pursuits. On the same day, a petition demanding Joseph's withdrawal focusing on the offensiveness to women of the explicit sexual nature of the Instagram follows was started on change.org.

On Friday April 11, the Courier du Sud and TVRS reported that Le Centre d’aide et de lutte contre les aggressions à caractère sexuel (CALACS) de Longueuil, who advocate against sexual aggression and provide support to victims, was requesting that Natilien Joseph retire from the election.

By Tuesday April 15, other local groups had become aware Joseph's claim the page has been hacked was likely untrue, and joined CALACS in asking for Joseph to desist from running in the election.

April 17, 103.3 FM was also reporting a growing concern with the Liberal Party candidate from additional citizens' groups

Friday April 18, Le Courier du Sud reported Joseph has sent a written declaration apologizing for his page following inappropriate content, but it was not immediately clear from this report whether he was retracting his earlier claim his Instagram account had been hacked.

On April 24, Journal de Montréal made it somewhat clearer that Joseph was not only apologizing for the followed content, but also admitting his page had not, in fact, been pirated, and presumably also apologizing for his misleading statement.

Three days before the election, on April 25, incumbent Bloc Québecois candidate Denis Trudel, decried Natilien Joseph's absences from all scheduled campaign commitments, as well as his lack of respect for the women of Longueuil, its citizens, as well as towards news media.
