= Royal prerogative =

Powers available to government or executive

The royal prerogative is a body of customary authority, privilege, and immunity recognised in common law (and sometimes in civil law jurisdictions possessing a monarchy) as belonging to the sovereign, and which have become widely vested in the government. (Note: In Commonwealth realms, the wording the Crown is usually used in this context instead of king or queen.) It is the means by which some of the executive powers of government, possessed by and vested in a monarch with regard to the process of governance of the state, are carried out.

== Evolution ==
In most constitutional monarchies, prerogatives can be abolished by Parliament under its legislative authority. In the Commonwealth realms, this draws on the constitutional statutes at the time of the Glorious Revolution, when William III and Mary II were invited to take the throne.

In the United Kingdom, the remaining powers of the royal prerogative are devolved to the head of the government, which, for more than two centuries, has been the Prime Minister; the benefits, equally, such as ratification of treaties and mineral rights in all gold and silver ores, vest in (belong to) the government.

In Britain, prerogative powers were originally exercised by the monarch acting without an observed requirement for parliamentary consent (after its empowerment in certain matters following Magna Carta). Since the accession of the House of Hanover, these powers have been exercised, with minor exceptions in economically unimportant sectors, on the advice of the prime minister or the Cabinet, who are accountable to Parliament (and exclusively so, except in matters of the Royal Family) since at least the time of William IV.

Typically, in liberal democracies that are constitutional monarchies as well as nation states, such as Denmark, Norway, and Sweden, the royal prerogative serves in practice as a prescribed ceremonial function of the state power.

=== Ministerial exercise of the monarch's prerogatives ===
Today, prerogative powers fall into two main categories:

- Those directly exercised by ministers without the approval of parliament, including, in some countries such as the UK, the powers to regulate the civil service, issue passports, and grant honours.
- Those exercised nominally by the monarch, "on the advice of" (that is, by constitutional convention, however so requested by) the prime minister and on the advice of the cabinet.

Some key areas of government are carried out by the royal prerogative, but its usage is falling as functions are progressively made statutory.

== Commonwealth realms ==
=== United Kingdom ===
In the Kingdom of England (up to 1707), the Kingdom of Great Britain (1707–1800), and the United Kingdom (since 1801), the royal prerogative was and is one of the central features of the realm's governance.

Constitutional theorist A. V. Dicey defines the scope of prerogative powers as:

the remaining portion of the Crown's original authority, and it is therefore ... the name for the residue of discretionary power left at any moment in the hands of the Crown, whether such power be in fact exercised by the King himself or by his Ministers.

The scope of the royal prerogative is difficult to determine due to the uncodified nature of the constitution. It is clear that the existence and extent of the power is a matter of the common law of England, making the courts the final arbiter of whether a particular type of prerogative exists or not. Nevertheless, certain prerogative powers have been widely acknowledged and accepted over time, while others have fallen out of use.

The royal prerogative is not constitutionally unlimited. In the Case of Proclamations (1611) during the reign of King James VI/I, English common law courts judges emphatically asserted that they possessed the right to determine the limits of the royal prerogative. Since the Glorious Revolution in 1688, which brought co-monarchs King William III and Queen Mary II to power, this interpretation of there being a separate and distinct power of the judiciary has not been challenged by the Crown. It has been accepted that it is emphatically the province of the court(s) to say what the law is, or means. This is a crucial corollary and foundation to the concept of the judicial power; and its distinct and separate nature from the executive power possessed by the Crown itself, or its ministers. In most cases, the Monarch exercises the prerogative powers only on the advice of the Government of the day, either directly or through the Privy Council.

==== British dependencies ====
Generally, the Crown retains plenary power in an overseas territory (or 'dependent territory' from 1983 to 2002 or 'Crown colony' before that), even if in practice it is not directly exercised. Thus the royal prerogative is in theory an unlimited, arbitrary authority. In British overseas territories however, each inhabited territory has a constitution by which the territory is governed locally.

The absoluteness of the royal prerogative in the colonies was however defeated in the case of Campbell v Hall in 1774. This case decided that once a colony gained a representative assembly (or once the governor has been instructed to call one), the royal authority is limited to the familiar prerogatives; without the assembly's consent the Crown could not raise taxation nor change the law. Several of the colonies of the British West Indies thus became "settled colonies", and reverted to "crown colony" status only by Act of Parliament in the nineteenth century.

In August 2009, Michael Misick, first Premier of the Turks and Caicos Islands, a British Overseas Territory, resigned under charges of corruption and abuse of power. In order to restore the rule of law, the UK government took direct control of the government of the territory, under an Order in Council of 18 March 2009, which suspended and amended parts of the Islands' constitution, and vacated all the offices of ministers and the House of Assembly. This action was not an exercise of the royal prerogative, as it was made under "the West Indies Act 1962 and of all other powers enabling Her to do so", but did vest wide discretionary legislative and executive powers in Her Majesty's governor, who as in all British Overseas Territories, acts on the instructions of the UK government, not the monarch. A new constitution was promulgated in October 2012 and the government was returned to full local administration after the November 2012 elections.

In the case of the Chagos Archipelago, in 2000, the High Court of Justice of England and Wales ruled that a local ordinance made by the Commissioner of the British Indian Ocean Territory exiling the islanders was unlawful, a decision which was accepted by the British Foreign Secretary Robin Cook. That Order was legislation passed under authority given by the royal prerogative, not an exercise of the prerogative itself, and was overturned as being beyond the powers given. After this decision, the British government issued an Order in Council, a primary exercise of the royal prerogative, to achieve the same objective. This Order was also ruled unlawful by the High Court, a ruling upheld in the Court of Appeal. However, on Wednesday, 22 October 2008, the government won its appeal in the House of Lords against the previous rulings. The House decided by a three-to-two majority that the Order in Council was a lawful exercise of authority. In their speeches, the Law Lords admitted the government of the day was morally wrong to force out some 2,000 residents of the Chagos Archipelago, a British Crown colony, to make way for a US air base in the 1960s. Nevertheless, the majority could not find legal fault in the Order.

=== Canada ===
In Canada, the royal prerogative is, for the most part, the same as that in the United Kingdom, as constrained by constitutional convention, although its exercise is usually through the federal governor general in the Privy Council of Canada, or the provincial lieutenant governors in the provincial executive councils. The royal prerogative in Canada is largely set out in Part III of the Constitution Act, 1867, particularly section 9.

As foreign affairs are a matter of royal prerogative, the power to declare war and deploy the armed forces belongs to the Crown, though only in its federal Cabinet (the federal government), as outlined in sections 9 and 15 of the Constitution Act, 1867. Neither legislation nor any other type of parliamentary approval, beyond budgetary matters, is required for such actions, though the Cabinet has on occasion consulted parliament before engaging Canada or extending Canada's involvement in a conflict. Additionally, the federal Crown may ratify treaties. Again, the endorsement of Parliament is not necessary for these agreements to have force in an international sense, but the federal Parliament and the provincial legislatures must pass statutes in order for them to have domestic effect, under the division of powers set out in sections 91 and 92 of the Constitution Act, 1867. Proposed treaties have also occasionally been presented to parliament for debate before ratification. Members of Parliament have tabled bills seeking to curtail the use of the royal prerogative in foreign affairs by legislating a greater role for parliament, as have Senate standing committees, from time to time, called for the same.

The issuance of passports also remains within the royal prerogative in Canada. The terms for the issuing of passports by the Minister of Foreign Affairs on behalf of the Crown are set out in the Canadian Passport Order, issued by the Governor General-in-Council. The Canadian government has used the royal prerogative on two occasions to deny a passport to a Canadian citizen, Abdurahman Khadr and Fateh Kamel. Lawsuits filed at the Federal Court, Federal Court of Appeal, and ultimately the Supreme Court of Canada did not find in favour of either Khadr, nor Kamel.

The royal prerogative in Canada extends also to the granting of honours, as explained by the Court of Appeal for Ontario in Black v Chrétien (regarding Conrad Black's entitlement to an appointment to the House of Lords while a Canadian citizen). Other royal prerogatives, such as the prerogative of mercy, also exist in the Canadian context, although largely supplanted for criminal matters by statutory provisions.

=== Other Commonwealth realms ===
In the other Commonwealth realms, the royal prerogative can be or is specifically mandated to be exercised by the monarch's representative, the governor-general. In the case of Australia, the royal prerogative, although resides in the monarch, it is exercisable by the governor-general of Australia for military affairs and is defined by the Constitution of Australia.

The constitution of a Commonwealth realm may also sharply limit the prerogative. In some cases, governmental acts which would normally require royal prerogative may be enacted through other means in the constitution, or through a legislative act in a Commonwealth realm, such as was seen in the United Kingdom, where a previous act of parliament dictated the conditions in which an early election could be called, which was a purely Royal Prerogative prior to its passage.

== Spain ==
The Spanish Constitution of 1978, Title II The Crown, Article 62, delineates the powers of the king, while Title IV Government and Administration, Article 99, defines the king's role in government. Title VI Judicial Power, Article 117, Articles 122 through 124, outlines the king's role in the country's independent judiciary. However, by constitutional convention established by Juan Carlos I, the king exercises his prerogatives having solicited government advice while maintaining a politically non-partisan and independent monarchy. Receiving government advice does not necessarily bind the monarch into executing the advice, except where prescribed by the constitution.

It is incumbent upon the King:

a. to sanction and promulgate the laws;
b. to summon and dissolve the Cortes Generales and to call elections under the terms provided in the Constitution;
c. to call a referendum in the circumstances provided for in the Constitution;
d. to propose a candidate for President of the Government and, as the case may be, appoint him or remove him from office, as provided in the Constitution;
e. to appoint and dismiss members of the Government on the proposal of its President;
f. to issue the decrees agreed upon by the Council of Ministers, to confer civil and military employments and award honours and distinctions in conformity with the law;
g. to keep himself informed regarding affairs of State and, for this purpose, to preside over the meetings of the Council of Ministers whenever he deems opportune, at the request of the President of the Government;
h. to exercise supreme command of the Armed Forces;
i. to exercise the right to grant pardons in accordance with the law, which may not authorize general pardons;
j. to exercise the High Patronage of the Royal Academies.

== See also ==
- Divine right of kings
- Five Knights case
- Jura regalia
- King-in-Parliament
- Letters patent
- Prorogatio
- Reserve power
- Royal assent
- Royal charter
- Royal order
- Royal prerogative in the United Kingdom
- Statutory instrument
