= Nic Leblanc =

Canadian politician

The Honourable Nic Leblanc

Member of the Canadian Parliament for Longueuil
- In office 1984–1997
- Preceded by: Jacques Olivier
- Succeeded by: Caroline St-Hilaire

Personal details
- Born: 15 November 1941 (age 84) Saint-Monique, Quebec, Canada
- Party: Quebec Liberal Party
- Other political affiliations: Canadian Alliance (federal, c. 2000); Bloc Québécois (federal, c. 1990–1997); Progressive Conservative (federal, c. 1984–1990)
- Profession: Businessman

Nic Leblanc (born 15 November 1941) was a member of the House of Commons of Canada from 1984 to 1997. He is a businessperson by career.

Born in Sainte-Monique, Quebec, Leblanc was first elected in the Longueuil electoral district under the Progressive Conservative party in the 1984 federal election.

He was re-elected in the 1988 federal election, only to leave the Progressive Conservative party on 26 June 1990 following the implosion of the Meech Lake Accord. In December that same year he would join the separatist Bloc Québécois party in Parliament.

Leblanc won another election in Longueuil riding in 1993. But in 1997, he left the Bloc Québécois and sat as an "independent sovereigntist" in the House of Commons. He did not seek re-election when the 36th Canadian Parliament ended later that year. In his varied Canadian political career, Leblanc served in the 33rd, 34th and 35th Canadian Parliaments.

After some time out of Canadian politics, Leblanc joined the Canadian Alliance on 28 August 2000. He campaigned in the Saint-Lambert electoral district during the 2000, but lost to Liberal candidate Yolande Thibeault.

In the 2007 Quebec elections, Leblanc was the Liberal candidate for National Assembly of Quebec in the Marie-Victorin riding. He was defeated, finishing in a distant third place.
