= Munsinger affair =

1966 Canadian sex scandal

The Munsinger affair was Canada's first national political sex scandal in 1966. The affair involved Gerda Munsinger, a German citizen who had been convicted in Germany as a common prostitute, a petty thief and a smuggler, who emigrated to Canada in 1956 in spite of a warning card dated 1952, and who in 1960 was the mistress of the then Associate Minister of National Defence Pierre Sévigny. Munsinger was "a self-admitted espionage agent" in the employ of the "Russian Intelligence Service".

== The affair in Ottawa ==
Munsinger had been accepted into a Canadian Immigration program looking for young women displaced by war to work as domestics and au pairs in Canada. She arrived in Quebec City aboard the Acosta Sun in search of a better life. She was assigned to a family in Montreal. She eventually left that job and went on to find work as a hostess in Montreal's nightclub scene. Munsinger also worked part-time as a waitress at the Chic 'n' Coop Restaurant which was owned by the gangster William Obront of the Cotroni family.

As she was an attractive woman, she also moonlighted as a model for several Montreal furriers. Her looks and good humour made her popular amongst high society. She was introduced to many notable businessmen and politicians. Most noted amongst these was the Associate Minister of National Defence, Pierre Sévigny, who met her in the summer of 1958. She applied for Canadian citizenship in 1960. A routine security check by the Royal Canadian Mounted Police (RCMP) discovered elements in her background that raised questions. The file was supplied to the RCMP by a foreign intelligence service, the CIA. She was put under surveillance. Sévigny was observed visiting her apartment in November 1960. The RCMP informed Justice Minister E. Davie Fulton of her activities. Fulton brought the file to the attention of Prime Minister Diefenbaker. Diefenbaker ordered Sévigny to break off the relationship with Munsinger and continue on with his duties. Munsinger left Canada to return to East Germany in 1961. Rumours circulated that she died of leukemia upon her return.

== Possible security breach ==
After the Gouzenko affair, matters of Canadian national security were not usually made the subject of public debate. In 1966, however, the Liberal government came under attack for a security breach involving two Soviet diplomats and George Victor Spencer, a Vancouver mail clerk, who confessed to collecting information for the Soviet Embassy. On March 4, John Diefenbaker called Liberal Justice Minister Lucien Cardin "a dwarf in giant's clothing" for his handling of the Spencer case. Two days later, Cardin rebutted the Tories by bringing up Munsinger's name in the House of Commons responding to Diefenbaker's attacks. Cardin was told that Munsinger was dead. His aim was to criticize Diefenbaker's handling of the case five years earlier.

The day after Justice Minister Cardin pronounced to the Canadian press that she was indeed dead, Munsinger was tracked down and interviewed in Munich by Toronto Daily Star reporter Robert Reguly. She freely admitted her numerous affairs with government officials to the Canadian media. The story dominated the media for weeks and was followed with rapt attention across the country. It became a massive distraction and all but shut down all other parliamentary activity for some weeks.

A Royal Commission was immediately convened. In his report, Supreme Court Justice Wishart Spence found no criminal wrongdoing or security breach, but he did criticize Diefenbaker's handling of the case.

== Legacy ==
Lester B. Pearson's gambit to distract a nation from scandals plaguing his government partially worked but eventually backfired on him. His weak leadership of the Liberal party came into question with his handling of this affair. He was replaced as leader of the party by Pierre Elliot Trudeau in 1968. Diefenbaker did not fare any better. A cabal of dissidents led by Dalton Camp and Flora MacDonald saw to it that he too was replaced as leader of the Progressive Conservative party by Robert Stanfield the previous year. The vitriol, recriminations and political mudslinging in Parliament created by the affair almost destroyed the House of Commons.

The newsmagazine This Hour Has Seven Days published a series on the scandal and one of the major news organizations involved in covering it as it unfolded. The series was cancelled by the Canadian Broadcasting Corporation (CBC) just weeks after the Munsinger Affair broke. The real reason for its cancellation as believed by some observers was that the show's dogged pursuit of the story would uncover the truth behind Pearson's ascension to power in 1963 when six Creditistes mysteriously crossed the floor in support of the Liberals giving them a majority in the House just days after having fought an election campaign in April of that year.

Charles Lynch, bureau chief of Southam News, suggested the Munsinger affair might change Canada's "dull and unexciting" image, and promote the upcoming Expo 67.

== Books ==
- Auger, Michel; Edwards, Peter (2004). The Encyclopedia of Canadian Organized Crime: From Captain Kidd to Mom Boucher. Toronto: McClelland & Stewart. ISBN 0771030495.
