= Auguste Vincent =

Canadian politician

Member of Parliament for Longueuil
- In office August 1953 – March 1958

Personal details
- Born: 27 June 1915 Lorrainville, Quebec, Canada
- Died: 22 October 1998 (aged 83) Montreal, Quebec, Canada
- Party: Liberal
- Spouse: Lucie Vanier
- Profession: lawyer

Auguste Vincent (27 June 1915 – 22 October 1998) was a Canadian lawyer and politician. Vincent served as a Liberal party member of the House of Commons of Canada. Born in Lorrainville, Quebec.

He was first elected at the Longueuil riding in the 1953 general election and re-elected for a second term in 1957. In the 1958 election he was defeated by Pierre Sévigny of the Progressive Conservative party. Vincent also made an unsuccessful bid to return to Parliament at Longueuil in the 1962 election.
