= Pierre Sévigny (politician) =

Canadian politician

The Honourable Pierre Sévigny PC OC CD ED

Associate Minister of National Defence
- In office 20 August 1959 – 8 February 1963
- Prime Minister: John Diefenbaker
- Preceded by: Vacant
- Succeeded by: Vacant

Member of Parliament for Longueuil
- In office 31 March 1958 – 7 April 1963
- Preceded by: Auguste Vincent
- Succeeded by: Jean-Pierre Côté

Personal details
- Born: Joseph Pierre Albert Sévigny; 12 September 1917 Quebec City, Quebec, Canada
- Died: 20 March 2004 (aged 86) Montreal, Quebec, Canada
- Party: Progressive Conservative
- Other political affiliations: Les Démocrates
- Spouse: Corinne Kernan (m. 1946)
- Children: 3
- Relatives: Albert Sévigny (father)
- Education: Université Laval; Columbia University
- Occupation: Contractor; Industrialist; Real Estate Agent

Military service
- Allegiance: Canada
- Branch/service: Canadian Army
- Years of service: 1940–1946
- Rank: Lieutenant-colonel
- Unit: Royal Canadian Artillery

Joseph Pierre Albert Sévigny PC (French: [seviɲi]; September 12, 1917 – March 20, 2004) was a Canadian soldier, author, politician, and academic. He is best known for his involvement in the Munsinger Affair.

== Life and career ==
Born in Quebec City, Quebec, the son of Albert Sévigny, the Speaker of the House of Commons of Canada in 1916, he graduated from Université Laval and Columbia University. He briefly attempted to pursue a career in acting, even being given a screen test by MGM in 1935, but instead returned to Canada to work in real estate, construction and in the import-export business. He also wrote fiction for The Saturday Evening Post under the pen name Peter Maple.

Sévigny served in the Canadian Army during World War II, and lost a leg in the Battle of the Rhineland. He was awarded the Virtuti Militari, Poland's highest military decoration, for his involvement in the battle at Hill 262. Along with his Polish comrades of the 1st Polish Armoured Division, he denied access to Panzer divisions trying to break out of the Falaise pocket in August 1944. The action resulted in the encirclement and capture of 50,000 German troops. He also received France's Croix de Guerre and Belgium's Croix de Guerre. After the war he wrote a book Face à l'ennemi about his experiences. It won the Prix Ferrières de l'Académie française in 1948. In 1965, he wrote his second book, This Game of Politics for McClelland and Stewart.

He was elected to the House of Commons in the 1958 election, representing the electoral district of Longueuil—Pierre-Boucher, and served as Associate Defence Minister in the Progressive Conservative government of John Diefenbaker. He was reelected in the 1962 election, but was defeated in the 1963 vote.

Sevigny was the father of Expo 67. Diefenbaker wrote in his memoirs: "And it was to prepare for the celebration of our One Hundredth Birthday that my government set in motion the plans necessary to co-ordinate activities at every level across this country to make possible the grand and appropriate Centennial Celebrations of 1967. It was Senator Drouin and the Honourable Pierre Sevigny who first put forward the idea for Expo67 in Montreal. Marc Drouin was a man of ability who had an understanding of Canada as a whole, and I appointed him to the senate, where he served as Government Leader. His premature death was a great loss to Canada. I believe it was Colonel Sevigny who first asked me to do what I could to bring about Canada's selection as the site for the international exposition of 1967..."

During a routine investigation into a passport request from one Gerda Munsinger in 1960, it was discovered that her maiden name was Heseler and that she had been denied an immigration visa to visit Canada in 1952. It was also revealed that she had affairs with several important cabinet ministers in the Diefenbaker government. Sevigny was named in the report. The RCMP brought the report to the attention of Minister of Justice Davie Fulton who immediately showed it to Diefenbaker. Sevigny was called to explain his relationship. Diefenbaker instructed Sevigny to break off the liaison, and deemed the matter closed.

The affair resurfaced in 1966 when then Justice Minister Lucien Cardin (under Lester Pearson) was pressed to explain government action of the George Victor Spencer affair in the House of Commons by shouting out "What about Monseignor". referring to Gerda Munsinger. The original file had been altered to reflect a security issue. It described Munsinger as being a prostitute and alleged spy and had remained under wraps for 17 months in Lester B. Pearson's office. Cardin's goal was to deflect the nation's attention from the Dupuis, Favreau and Spencer scandals besetting Pearson's weak leadership.

A Royal Commission, chaired by Justice Wishart Spence, was called by the government of Lester Pearson into the Munsinger Affair. The inquiry chastised Sévigny for his behavior and criticized Diefenbaker for leniency towards his Ministers, but absolved Sévigny of any guilt relating to any breach of security.

In 1967, he started teaching business administration at Concordia University, eventually becoming executive-in-residence in 1982. He retired in 1995, but returned two years later as a visiting assistant professor.

In 1971, he ran for the leadership of the provincial Union Nationale party. He placed last of four candidates on the first ballot, with 26 of the 1,205 votes cast, and was eliminated from subsequent ballots.

In 1978, Sévigny and Camil Samson founded the short-lived political party Les Démocrates in Quebec which became the Parti démocrate créditiste before dissolving after Samson left to join the Quebec Liberals and the party, led now by Sévigny, was unable to field a slate of 10 candidates and dissolved prior to the 1981 Quebec election.

Sévigny was made an Officer of the Order of Canada in 1994 during the tenure of Jean Chrétien.

He died in Montreal in 2004.

== Archives ==
There is a Pierre Sévigny fonds at Library and Archives Canada.
