= Eric Reguly =

- Born: Vancouver, British Columbia, Canada
- Citizenship: Canada, Italy
- Occupation: Newspaper columnist
- Children: 2
- Father: Robert Reguly
- Website: ericreguly.com

Eric Reguly is a Canadian newspaper columnist. He is the European bureau chief for The Globe and Mail and is based in Rome. He writes primarily on economic, financial, and environmental issues.

Reguly worked with several Canadian newspapers prior to joining The Globe in 1997, and he has won several awards for his work. In April 2007, he became The Globe's European business correspondent.

Reguly was born in Vancouver, grew up in Toronto, Washington, D.C., and Rome and has Canadian and Italian citizenship. He is the son of award-winning investigative journalist Robert Reguly and is married with two daughters.
