= Robert Reguly =

- Born: Robert Joseph Reguly; 19 January 1931; Fort William, Ontario
- Died: 24 February 2011 (aged 80); Toronto, Ontario
- Occupation: journalist
- Children: 3, including Eric Reguly

Robert Joseph Reguly (19 January 1931, in Fort William, Ontario – 24 February 2011) was a three-time National Newspaper Award-winning investigative journalist. He was one of Canada's top reporters in the 1950s and 1960s, and was at the forefront of the mid-20th century news war between the Toronto Telegram and his own paper, the Toronto Star.

== Career ==
Reguly won his first National Newspaper Award in 1964 for tracking down union leader Hal Banks, a fugitive who had fled to Brooklyn, New York. He won his second Award in 1966 for tracking down and interviewing Gerda Munsinger, an East German woman at the center of a Canadian political sex scandal. The Star then gave him a coveted posting as Washington D.C. bureau chief, where he moved with his family in the summer of 1966.

In May 1967, Reguly was sent to South Vietnam to cover the Vietnam War, then at its height. He filed dozens of stories for the Star reporting on American combat efforts, starting with Operation Hickory, the first U.S. invasion of the DMZ (the Demilitarized Zone between North and South Vietnam). Reguly also witnessed and reported on the forced relocation of Montagnard tribespeople in the Central Highlands, telling his readers that such operations might be "creating more Viet Cong".

After returning to the United States, Reguly covered the 1968 US presidential campaign. According to his son, Eric, "the only event he covered that truly shattered him was Bobby Kennedy's assassination" at the Ambassador Hotel in Los Angeles. (He was standing less than 10 metres from Kennedy when the senator was shot.) Reguly garnered a third National Newspaper Award for his coverage of anti-war protests and race riots.

In 1977, Reguly left the Star to join the staff of the Toronto Sun, where he specialized in investigative pieces on the Royal Canadian Mounted Police. In 1981, he left the Sun after he falsely alleged that Liberal cabinet minister John Munro had engaged in insider trading. The Sun and Reguly were subsequently successfully sued by Munro for defamation for carrying the story. Reguly then became a spokesperson for the Ontario Ministry of the Environment.

After his retirement, he became a successful freelance writer, writing mainly for outdoors magazines. In 2001, he was nominated for a Canadian National Magazine Award for an article in Outdoor Canada magazine.

== Personal life ==
Reguly married his wife, Ada, in 1956. The couple had three children, including journalist Eric Reguly, who writes for The Globe and Mail.

Reguly contracted heart disease in his last years. He died at his Toronto residence on 24 February 2011.
