= Kathryn N. Feldman =

Canadian jurist

The Honourable Madam Justice Kathryn N. Feldman

Justice of the Ontario Superior Court of Justice
- In office 1990–1998

Justice of the Court of Appeal for Ontario
- Incumbent
- Assumed office 1998

Personal details
- Education: University of Toronto (BA, 1970); University of Toronto Faculty of Law (LLB, 1973)

Kathryn N. Feldman is a justice of the Court of Appeal for Ontario, appointed to the bench in 1998. Previously, she was a justice of the Ontario Superior Court of Justice, appointed in 1990. She is a 1970 graduate of the University of Toronto and a 1973 graduate of the University of Toronto Faculty of Law. Before joining the judiciary, Feldman was a litigation partner at Blake, Cassels & Graydon.
