= Timeline of the Front de libération du Québec =

The following is a timeline of the FLQ, from the founding of the Front de libération du Québec (FLQ) in the early 1960s to the publishing of the enquiry commission reports in the 1980s.

Contents :	1962 • 1963 • 1964 • 1965 • 1966 • 1967 • 1968 • 1969 • 1970 • 1971 • 1972 • 1973 • 1974 • 1975 • 1976 • 1977 • 1978 • 1979 • 1980 • 1981 • 1982 •

== 1962 ==
- On July 1, Jacques Giroux writes "I am a separatist" on the Sir John A. Macdonald monument in Dorchester Square.
- On October 31, the Comité de libération nationale is founded secretly by four RIN (Rassemblement pour l'Indépendance Nationale) militants: Jacques Désormeaux, Jacques Lucques, Robert Aubin and Philippe Bernard.
- In November, 24 RIN militants form the Réseau de Résistance (RR) during a meeting at the home of Montreal's new regional executive president, Rodrigue Guité.
- The Sunday following the first meeting, members of the Réseau de Résistance paint "Free Quebec" on English-only posters and throw several Red Ensigns and the Flag of the United Kingdom into the trash in Saint-Sauveur.

== 1963 ==
- On February 23, a Molotov cocktail is thrown through the window of the English-language radio CKGM in Montreal. The RR claims responsibility.
- Late February, founding of the Front de libération du Québec (FLQ) by Gabriel Hudon, Georges Schoeters and Raymond Villeneuve, who had met through the RR.
- In the night between March 7 and 8, three military barracks located in Montreal and Westmount are attacked with FLQ incendiary bombs.
- In mid-March, the first dynamite theft was conducted at a Montreal Metro construction site, followed by another at the future location of the Laurier station.
- On March 29, the statue of James Wolfe on the Plains of Abraham is unbolted, falls and breaks in several pieces.
- On April 1, three bombs are placed and two explode: one at a Federal Tax building, a second at the Central Station located in Montreal, and a third on a CN railway line. The bomb set to explode on the CN railway line is discovered before the passing of the train transporting Prime Minister of Canada John Diefenbaker. He exclaimed "Is this Ireland?" upon learning of the attempt.
- On April 6, 24 sticks of dynamite are laid at the foot of the Radio-Canada transmission tower on Mount Royal. A technical defect prevents the explosion.
- On April 12, in a joint operation of the Royal Canadian Mounted Police (RCMP) and the Montreal police service, dozens of searches are done in residences of militants for the independence of Quebec belonging to various associations. 20 people are arrested and interrogated, including Raoul Roy, Édouard Cloutier, Jacques Lucques. The event was dubbed the "Razzia du Vendredi saint".
- On April 16, publishing of the first FLQ manifesto entitled "Message du FLQ à la Nation". (Manifeste d’avril 1963 on French Wikisource)
- On April 19, the RIN and the ASIQ (of which several members were arrested on April 12) protest before the headquarters of the RCMP in Westmount.
- In the night between April 19 and 20, a bomb explodes against a wall of the RCMP headquarters in Westmount.
- On April 21, Wilfred O'Neil, night guard at the Canadian Forces Recruiting Centre in Montreal is killed by the explosion of a bomb claimed by the FLQ.
- On May 3, three bomb attacks are perpetrated: one bomb explodes at the building of Royal Canadian Legion Veterans at Saint-Jean-sur-Richelieu, another is found and disarmed at the central post office and another, not armed, is found at the headquarters of the Solbec Copper mining company.
- On May 7, the City of Montreal offers $10,000 CAD to whoever can provide information leading to the capture of FLQ members.
- On May 10, a dynamite charge explodes at night against the wall of the BlackWatch regiment building in Montreal.
- On May 13, a bomb explodes at the Technical Service Unit of the Canadian Air Force located in Mont-Royal.
- On May 16, an explosive device sets off near the reservoirs of the Golden Eagle refinery located at Pointe-aux-Trembles.
- On May 17, the FLQ places ten bombs in as many residential mailboxes of the town of Westmount. Each bomb is made of four dynamite sticks. Five of these ten bombs explode toward 3:00 am. Walter Leja, Sergeant Major of the Canadian Army, is injured while trying to disarm one of the explosive devices.
- On May 19, the government of Quebec offers $50,000 to whoever will be able to provide information leading to the capture of FLQ members. The City of Montreal raises its reward from $10,000 to $60,000.
- On May 20, Victoria Day, 75 dynamite sticks explode against the wall of an arms room belonging to the 1st battalion of the Canadian Army's technical services in Montreal (nicknamed "Opération Chénier" by the FLQ, in honour of Jean-Olivier Chénier).
- On June 1, the eight main leaders of the FLQ gather at Denis Lamoureux's apartment to discuss the reorganization and expansion of their group. Is then planned the division of the movement into two sections: a political section, the FLQ, and a military section, the Armée de libération du Québec (ALQ). Jean-Jacques Lanciault, who participates to the discussion, is a delator for the police and wins the $60,000 award of the City of Montreal for his information. Thanks to Lanciault's information, the police forces will arrest 23 militants and dismantle a complete network of the FLQ.
- On June 16, 18 people associated to the FLQ are arrested.
- In June, Bernard Smith, Jean-Marc Léger, Pierre De Bellefeuille, André Morel, Marcel Rioux, Michel Chartrand, Jean-Victor Dufresne, Réginald Boisvert, Marcel Dubé and René Chaloult found the Comité Chénier, a committee of support to the convicts.
- On June 30, the Parti socialiste du Québec (PSQ) was founded.
- On July xx, Jean Lasalle, Jean Gagnon, Jules Duchastel, André Wattier, Robert Hudon set up the Armée de libération du Québec.
- On July 12, the FLQ set off a powerful dynamite explosion in the Parc Victoria in Quebec City, blowing apart a monument to Queen Victoria; the statue's head was later found 100 yards away.
- On July 19, the federal government of Lester B. Pearson sets up the Royal Commission on Bilingualism and Biculturalism.
- On August 22, a bomb explodes underneath a railroad bridge of the Canadian Pacific Railway (CP) near Kahnawake.
- On August 26, 700 dynamite sticks are stolen from the construction site of Autoroute 15, near Saint-Sauveur.
- On August 27, Jacques Lanctôt, Guy De Grasse and Richard Bros are arrest on the charge of setting fire to two military barracks located in Montreal, as well as the building of the Royal Canadian Legion in Laval-Ouest and a shelter belonging to the Canadian National Railways on île Bigras.
- On September 26, five members of the ALQ performed an armed robbery in a Royal Bank of Canada office. $7,000 are stolen. Two people are arrested in connection with the robbery: Jules Duchastel and Claude Soulières.
- In October, publishing of the first issue of La Cognée, the official publication of the FLQ. (66 issues are printed between 1963 and 1967.)
- On October 7, Gabriel Hudon, Raymond Villeneuve, Jacques Giroux and Yves Labonté, arrested on the 16, plead guilty to the charge of involuntary homicide.
- On October 9, two bombs are discovered and disarmed in post offices located in Longueuil and Saint-Lambert.
- On October 16, the police arrests Barnabe Garcia, a political refugee from Spain who arrived in Canada in 1957.
- On November 26, the ALQ steals radio transmission equipment from the CHEF station of Grandby.

== 1964 ==
- On January 30, between 7:30 and 9:00, the ALQ performs an important arms robbery from the barracks of the Fusiliers Mont-Royal Regiment located in Montreal. During the heist which was dubbed Opération Casernes, the ALQ managed to steal about $20,000 worth of firearms including: 59 Belgian semi-automatic rifles (FN 7.62×51mm NATO), four BREN machine guns, 34 Sten submachine guns, 4 60-millimetre mortars, 3 Bazooka rocket launchers, some grenades, 5 Browning semi-automatic pistols, 13,000 bullets (calibre 22), 2,000 calibre 7.62 and 2,300 calibre 303, as well as 15 radio transceivers, two portable phones, headlamps, electrical wires, one Gestetner stencil duplicator, sheets, etc.
- On February 1, military guards are posted 24 hours on 24 before all barracks in the Montreal metropolitan area.
- On February 20, between 7:46 and 11:15, the ALQ performs an arms and equipment robbery from the barrack of the 62nd regiment of campaign artillery in Shawinigan. The stolen material is estimated at $25,000: 33 semi-automatic rifles FN 7.62, pistols, a good quantity of bullets, 12 transceivers, one stencil duplicator, combat uniforms and UN blue helmets.
- On February 27, members of the ALQ rob a Desjardins credit union branch in Shawinigan and leave with $9,000.
- On March 2, a bomb made out of 10 dynamite sticks, wrapped in a Union Jack, is disarmed on the plains of Abraham.
- On March 14, a criminal fire causes $15,000 worth of damages at captain Henri Francoeur's residence. Francoeur is assistant to inspector Russell Senécal of the Combined Antiterrorist Squad (CATS).
- On March 30, the police arrests and interrogates Jacques Désormeaux, André Normand, Roger Normand, Jean Goulet, Jean Cloutier, Louis-Philippe Aubert and Bernard Mataigne.
- On April 9, following the armed robbery of a Banque Canadienne Nationale branch located in Mont-Rolland, the police apprehends Jean Lasalle, Jean Gagnon and René Dion of the ALQ.
- On April 21, 38th anniversary of Queen Elizabeth II, a bomb made out of ten dynamite sticks is found and disarmed below the Queen Victoria monument located on the campus of McGill University.
- On May 5, Robert Hudon becomes the last ALQ militant to be apprehended. The others, André Wattier, Pierre Nadon, Claude Perron and Maurice Leduc were apprehended between April 21 and May 5.
- On May 8, the eight members of the ALQ appear before the court. 50 different charges weight on them in total.
- On May 30, a bomb is found and disarmed below a statue raised in memory of the Canadian soldiers who died for the British Empire during the Boer Wars. The statue is located near the Parliament buildings in Quebec City.
- In June, founding of the Armée révolutionnaire du Québec (ARQ) led by François Schirm.
- On June 18, Hubert Aquin, militant of the RIN, publicly announces that he has "declared total war on all enemies of the independence of Québec". (The communiqué is published the day after in Le Devoir and other papers.)
- On August 29, the ARQ attacks the International Firearms armoury located in Montreal. Two employees, Leslie McWilliams and Alfred Pinish are killed.
- In September, the ARQ is dismantled by police forces who arrest some 20 militants.
- In September, publishing of the first issue of Révolution québécoise review, led by Pierre Vallières and Charles Gagnon.
- On November 2, a bomb explodes on the CFCF radio and CFCF-TV transmission tour.

== 1965 ==
- On February 16, the U.S. Federal Bureau of Investigation (FBI) announces they have prevented the perpetration of a plot by the Black Liberation Front and the FLQ which consisted in dynamiting the Statue of Liberty and other American monuments. Arrests were done on both sides of the border. Michèle Duclos was arrested in New York with dynamite in her car.
- In April, The Pentagon begins an enquiry into the "revolutionary activities" of Quebec. It is called Project Revolt.
- On April 30, explosion of a bomb at Place Victoria in Montreal.
- On May 1, a bomb explodes at the United States consul located in Montreal.
- On June 14, a bomb explodes at the RCMP headquarters in Quebec City.
- In June, Pierre Vallières founds the Mouvement de libération populaire (MLP). With Charles Gagnon, he joins the FLQ.
- On July 1, a bomb explodes in the Westmount City hall.
- On July 2, a bomb explodes against the CKTS English-language radio transmission tower in Sherbrooke.
- On July 15, members of the FLQ are arrested at La Macaza military station (Laurentides). One Sûreté du Québec (SQ) police officer is taken hostage.
- On July 28, a bomb explodes at the headquarters of the Canadian Imperial Bank of Commerce (CIBC) in Montreal.
- On August 2, bombs explode underneath a CP railroad bridge in Bordeaux and on a CN railroad track in Sainte-Madelaine.
- On August 22, the police dismantles an FLQ cell led by Gaston Collin, a former military officer.
- On November 1, a bomb explodes the Palais du Commerce de Montréal during a Liberal Party of Canada convention which Prime Minister Lester B. Pearson was attending.

== 1966 ==
- In January, the Vallières-Gagnon group begins operating under the FLQ banner.
- On May 5, a letter bomb sets off at the Lagrenade shoe factory in Montreal during a strike by the CSN. Thérèse Morin, secretary, is mortally wounded, dying en route to the hospital.
- On May 22, a bomb explodes at the Dominion Textile in Drummondville.
- On June 3, a bomb explodes at Centre Paul-Sauvé during a convention of the Liberal Party of Quebec to which Jean Lesage attends.
- On July 14, Jean Corbo (brother of Claude Corbo) dies in a bomb explosion which he himself arms at a Dominion Textile factory located in the Saint-Henri neighbourhood in Montreal.
- In August and September, the Vallières-Gagnon group is dismantled. Some 20 militants are arrested.
- On September 25, Pierre Vallières and Charles Gagnon picket before the United Nations building in New York. They are arrested and imprisoned, after which they do a hunger strike which lasts 30 days. (Their extradition occurs in January 1967.)
- In November, a group of citizens form the Comité d'aide au groupe Vallières-Gagnon.

== 1967 ==
- On January 1, a mailbox explodes in front of the Montreal Anglo-American Trust office.
- On January 13, Pierre Vallières and Charles Gagnon enter prison in Montreal.
- May 1967, DND instructed Military bases in Quebec to ensure personnel in uniform carry side arms when in public.
- On July 27, the Mouvement de libération du Québec (MLQ) claims responsibility for the bombing of Greenfield Park City Hall.
- On September 12, two bombs explode at MacDonald High School in Sainte-Anne-de-Bellevue.
- On October 16, a bomb explodes in a Seven-Up factory in Mont-Royal during a strike.
- In November, publishing of the first issue of La Victoire.

== 1968 ==
- On March 14, Jacques Désormeaux, member of the La Cognée network, is arrested by the police.
- On March 15, the book Nègres blancs d'Amérique; autobiographie précoce d'un « terroriste » québécois by Pierre Vallières is published by the Éditions Parti Pris.
- On May 11, a bomb explodes in a Seven-Up factory in Mont-Royal.
- On May 24, a bomb explodes at the United States consul in Montreal.
- On May 27, the Comité d'aide au groupe Vallières-Gagnon organizes the show Chansons et poèmes de la résistance. (Similar shows are held afterwards in various locations.)
- On September 25, a bomb explodes at the MacDonald monument on Dominion Square in Montreal.
- On October 14, bomb explode at the headquarters of the PLQ and the Union nationale (UN).
- On November 12, a bomb explodes at the Chambre de commerce de Montréal.
- On November 22, two bombs explode at the Eaton store of downtown Montreal.
- In November, Raymond Villeneuve leaves Canada for Cuba with three acolytes.
- On December 31, four bombs explode the same day.

== 1969 ==
- On January 2, three mail boxes located near federal offices explode.
- On January 8, a bomb explodes near the domicile of Jean-Paul Gilbert, Montreal chief of police.
- On February 13, a bomb explodes at the Montreal Stock Exchange. Some 27 people are injured.
- On March 4, Pierre-Paul Geoffroy, a former fireman, is arrested by the police. The network bearing his name is partly dismantled.
- On March 28, François Mario Bachand and other members of the FLQ organize the Opération McGill français. Some 15,000 people demonstrate on the university campus.
- In April, François Mario Bachand joins Raymond Villeneuve in Cuba.
- On April 3, Prime Minister Pierre Trudeau pulled 5,000 Canadian soldiers and airmen stationed in West Germany in order for them to be redeployed to Quebec.
- On May 5, Pierre Charette and Alain Allard of the Geoffroy network operate the hijacking of a Boeing 727 from the National Airlines flying between New York and Miami.
- On June 15, a bomb explodes at the headquarters of the Société Saint-Jean-Baptiste de Sherbrooke (SSJBS). (The SSJBS had invited Pierre Trudeau to preside the religious ceremonies of June 24.)
- On September 29, a bomb explodes at the domicile of Jean Drapeau, the Mayor of Montreal.
- On November 20, 1969, at 9:03 pm a bomb exploded in the ground floor stairwell of the Communications Arts building (Bryon building) at Loyola College. Damage to the building was estimated at $150,000. Despite there being hundreds of evening students in classrooms on the upper floors of the building, fortunately there were no injuries.
- On December 19, Pierre Trudeau, Robertson, and some federal ministers call Commissioner Higget in a meeting to order the RCMP secret service to treat the Quebec separatist movement as was then the communist movement.

== 1970 ==
- On February 20, Charles Gagnon is released on bail after three years and five months in prison.
- On February 26, Jacques Lanctôt and Pierre Marcil are arrested and released on bail. After their release, Montreal police determine they were plotting to kidnap Moshe Golan, consul of Israel.
- On April 5, Raymond Villeneuve, François Mario Bachand, André Garand, Pierre Charette and Alain Allard leave Havana for Genoa on the Cuban freighter the Matanzas. Villeneuve, Bachand and Garand disembarque at Genoa and continue to Paris. Charette and Allard, who are without passports, are refused admission by Italian authorities and return to Havana.
- June 24, FLQ bombing of National Defence Headquarters building in Ottawa kills Jeanne d'Arc Saint-Germain.
- On June 30, the Mouvement pour la défense des prisonniers politiques du Québec (MDPPQ) relays the Comité d'aide au groupe Vallières-Gagnon.
- July 3, bomb explodes at Petrofina Refinery at Point aux Trembles, East Montreal Island. A communiqué, written by Nigel Hamer, is published in Le Journal de Montréal two days later.
- On July 12, a bombing attempt was made on the Bank of Montreal downtown but was defused before it exploded.
- On October 5:
  - At 8:15, James Richard Cross, British trade commissioner in Montreal, is kidnapped by a group of armed men belonging to the FLQ Liberation Cell.
  - In the afternoon, the FLQ communicates a series of seven demands in exchange for the liberation of the hostage.
- On October 6, the FLQ manifesto is published in various newspapers. (Manifeste du Front de libération du Québec on French Wikisource)
  - Mitchell Sharp, the Canadian Secretary of State for Foreign and Commonwealth Affairs, claims the government will not give into the demands.
- On October 7, the police forces arrest 30 people. Journalist Louis Fournier of the CKAC radio station read the manifesto online. The Quebec Minister of Justice, Jérôme Choquette, states that he is willing to negotiate at any moment to liberate the hostage.
- On October 8, the announcer Gaétan Montreuil reads the FLQ manifesto on Radio-Canada television.
- On October 9:
  - The FLQ Liberation Cell extends the deadline for Cross's execution its demands to be met to October 10, 6 P.M.
  - Claude Ryan, editor in chief of the daily newspaper Le Devoir, suggest in an editorial that the government should negotiate.
- On October 10:
  - René Lévesque, in an article of the Journal de Montréal, invites the kidnappers to abandon violence.
  - Jérôme Choquette asserts to the media that he is ready to offer an exit door to the kidnapper if they free the hostage.
  - At 18:00, Pierre Laporte, Vice Premier and Minister of Employment and Labour, is kidnapped by members of the FLQ's Chénier Cell.
- On October 11,
  - Pierre Laporte writes a letter to Robert Bourassa, his personal friend, to tell him he is well treated and to ask him to negotiate his liberation.
  - FLQ Lawyer Robert Lemieux is arrested and imprisoned under the charge of hindering police work.
- On October 12:
  - At 7:00, Pierre Laporte writes a letter to his wife to tell her he is doing fine and is well treated.
  - Canadian soldiers are dispatched to Ottawa to ensure the protection of various politicians and protect federal buildings.
  - Robert Demers, treasurer of the PLQ, is appointed to negotiate for the government.
  - The FLQ Liberation Cell issues a communiqué saying that Cross and Laporte will be released if the 23 FLQ prisoners are released and the police stop all interaction with the FLQ.
- On October 13:
  - Robert Bourassa frees Robert Lemieux from prison and appoints him negotiator for the FLQ.
  - The negotiations between Robert Demers and Robert Lemieux fail.
- On October 14:
  - A special meeting of the federal cabinet is held to discuss measures to be taken to end the crisis.
  - A group of 16 people sign a public statement enjoining the government of Quebec to negotiate the liberation of the hostages whatever the cost, no matter the opinion of the federal government.
- On October 15:
  - At 14:00, Robert Bourassa announces that he has requested the Canadian Armed Forces to help the police protect politicians and public buildings. (He makes this request under the terms of the National Defence Act, not the War Measures Act.)
  - 3,000 students hold a rally in support of the FLQ.
  - The Quebec Government announces that it will release 5 of the FLQ prisoners on parole.
- On October 16, at 4:00, the federal cabinet proclaims the existence of an apprehended insurrection and issues a decree granting exceptional powers to the police and Canadian Armed Forces under the War Measures Act. The result is the temporary suspension of Quebecers' civil liberties, which is followed by a series of arrests and searches without warrant.
- On October 17, Pierre Laporte is found dead in the trunk of a car, near the St-Hubert airport. The Chénier cell claims the execution of its hostage at 6:18 p.m. He was either assassinated on the 17th as claimed by the Chénier cell members or died by accident after trying to escape.
- On October 18, the police issued warrants for FLQ members Marc Charbonneau and Paul Rose, with later warrants being issued on October 23 for Jacques Rose, Bernard Lostie, and Francis Simard.
- On November 2, police raided an apartment and arrested FLQ member Bernard Lostie.
- On November 6, Julien Giguère, lieutenant-detective of the Montreal police's Section anti-terroriste (SAT), recruits Carole Devault, who becomes informer matricule SAT 945–171, code name "Poupette".
- November 21, Richard Bros, FLQ member and friend of Jacques Lanctôt, is arrested in the London suburb of Islington on a charge of assault from an event November 14 that involved a fellow resident.
- November 22, Richard Bros is found dead in his cell, reportedly a suicide.
- In December, Carole Devault sets up the André Ouimet cell, a fictitious cell of the FLQ.
- On December 1, the Parliament of Canada enacts the Public Order Act.
- On December 2, two members, Jacques Cossette-Trudel and Louise Lanctôt, of the FLQ Liberation Cell were arrested.
- On December 3, James Richard Cross is located and freed by the police.
- On December 28, Paul Rose, Jacques Rose, and Francis Simard are located on a farm and arrested by the police.

== 1971 ==
- On January 6, Carole Devault and three accomplices set off an incendiary bomb in a building owned by the Brink's Company in Montreal.
- On January 20, the Mouvement pour la défense des prisonniers politiques du Québec (MDPPQ) organizes a public demonstration between Viger Square and the Palais de Justice de Montréal.
- On February 19, Carole Devault and her group set a dynamite bomb against a post office.
- On March 13, Paul Rose is sentenced to life imprisonment for the murder of Laporte, along with another life sentence for the kidnapping of Laporte on November 30. Rose is released on parole on December 20, 1982.
- March 24, Solicitor General Jean-Pierre Goyer, Director General of the RCMP Security Service John Starnes and Deputy Solicitor General Ernest Côté meet. Goyer orders Starnes to "neutralize" Mario Bachand, in Paris, an operation that had been planned since February. A heated exchange ensues; "Starnes objected that it would be pointless and hazardous and that the service was incapable of it." Goyer says he would consult with the Prime Minister.
- March 26, Solicitor General Jean-Pierre Goyer, RCMP Commissioner Len Higgitt, Director General of the RCMP Security Service John Starnes and Deputy Solicitor General Ernest Côté meet. Solicitor General Goyer tells Starnes that he had met with the prime minister, and "the Prime Minister has directed that, unless there were strong arguments to the contrary, prompt action should be taken."
- On March 29, François Mario Bachand is assassinated in Paris by Normand Roy and Denyse Leduc, in an RCMP operation ordered by Prime Minister Pierre Trudeau.
- On May 20, Francis Simard is sentenced to life imprisonment for the murder of Laporte.
- In October, the RCMP releases fake communiqués which she attributes to the Frères Chasseurs cell and the Pierre-Louis Bourret cell.
- On November 22, Bernard Lortie is sentenced to 20 years in prison for the kidnapping of Laporte.
- On December 9, Jacques Rose was acquitted in the trial against him for kidnapping Laporte, since Bernard Lortie refused to testify. Lostie received a 5-month sentence for refusing to testify.
- On December 18, Donald Cobb, commanding the Section G of the RCMP's secret services, releases the communiqué number 3 on behalf of La Minerve cell.

== 1972 ==
- On January 26, the police defused a plastic bomb at the entrance of the Canadian Imperial Bank of Commerce building. Two days later, a bomb exploded near the La Presse building, which was under lockout.
- In early June 1972, François Lanctôt, Jacinthe Lanctôt, Fernand Roy, and Serge Nadeau were captured.
- On May 5, the last bomb of the Front de libération du Québec exploded at the Casa d'Italia in Montreal. It was placed by the Reynald Lévesque cell.
- On May 8, the Petit Québec libre barn located in Sainte-Anne-de-la-Rochelle is burned down by the RCMP.
- On July 17, Jacques Rose is sent to 8 years in prison for being an accessory to the kidnapping of Laporte.
- On August 30, Reynald Lévesque and Jacques Millette were captured following a manhunt after robbing $10,000 from a credit union in East Montreal.
- On October 6, the Operation Bricole occurs at night: the list of the subscribers to the MDPPQ is stolen by a team composed of RCMP, Sûreté du Québec (SQ) and Montreal Police (SPCUM) agents. The Agence de presse libre du Québec is robbed as well.

== 1973 ==
- On January 8, the Operation Ham goes on during the night: the PQ's members list is stolen by the RCMP.
- On October 29, Quebec general election of 1973. (PLQ: 54.65%, PQ: 30.22%)

== 1976 ==
- On July 30, RCMP agent Robert Samson testifies in court: he affirms that the RCMP, in collaboration with the SQ and the SPCUM, stole documents from the MDPPQ the COOP and the APLQ. (He is condemned to seven years of prison.)
- On November 15, the Quebec general election of 1976 is held: (PQ: 41.37%, PLQ: 33.78%)

== 1977 ==
- On June 16, the government of Quebec sets up the Commission d'enquête sur les actions policières illégale en territoire québécois chaired by Jean Keable.
- The RCMP holds an internal inquiry on its own operations and recommends the federal government to hold a parliamentary inquiry.
- On July 6, the federal government sets up a Royal Commission of Inquiry into Certain Activities of the RCMP, chaired by David Cargill McDonald.
- On October 31, the Supreme Court of Canada rules that a provincial commission of enquiry does not have jurisdiction to enquire upon the RCMP.

== 1979 ==
- Jacques Lanctôt returns from exile.
- On November 26, publishing of the first report of the McDonald Commission (Sécurité et information : premier rapport).

== 1980 ==
- On July 8, Nigel Hamer is arrested for his involvement in the kidnapping of Cross. He pleads guilty and is sentenced to 12 months in prison with community service.
- On October 9, the Minister of Justice of Quebec publishes an incomplete edition of the Rapport sur les événements d'octobre 1970 by Jean-François Duchaîne.
- On November 17, Hamer was charged and sent to 12 months in prison for conspiracy, kidnapping, forcible detention, and extortion.

== 1981 ==
- A new edition of the Rapport sur les événements d'octobre 1970 by Jean-François Duchaîne is published.
- On January 26, publishing the two volumes of the report of the McDonald Commission (La liberté et la sécurité devant la loi : deuxième rapport).
- On February 15, Pierre-Paul Geoffroy is released under conditions after 12 years of incarceration.
- On March 6, publishing of the Keable Commission report.
- On August, publishing of the final report by the McDonald commission (Certaines activités de la GRC et la connaissance qu’en avait le gouvernement : troisième rapport).

== 1982 ==
- In September, Paul Rose is the last member of the FLQ to be released from prison.
- On September 27, Yves Langlois is sentenced to two years in prison for the kidnapping of Cross.

== 1984 ==
- Raymond Villeneuve is the last FLQ member to come back.

== See also ==
- FLQ Insurgency
