= Jean-Pierre Bonin =

Jean-Pierre Bonin (1942 – June 18, 2010) was a judge in the Canadian province of Quebec.

== Early life and career ==
Bonin was born in Woonsocket, Rhode Island, in the United States of America. He studied law at the Universite de Montreal and was called to the bar of Quebec in 1967. He completed a master's degree in law in 1978 and was appointed as the chief crown prosecutor for Montreal the following year.

In 1978, Bonin was the crown prosecutor against Jacques Cossette-Trudel and Louise Lanctôt, former members of the Front de libération du Québec (FLQ) who pleaded guilty to the kidnapping of United Kingdom diplomat James Cross. Over the next four years, he prosecuted separate cases against former FLQ members Alain Allard, Nigel Barry Hamer, Marc Carbonneau, and Yves Langlois.

Bonin also prosecuted the trial of Claude Vermette, a Royal Canadian Mounted Police (RCMP) officer who was charged with committing illegal activities in the line of duty, in the early 1980s. The trial drew attention to several illicit RCMP activities in Quebec during the 1970s. The case ended in a mistrial after Quebec premier René Lévesque criticized a trial witness during a legislative debate.

== Judge ==
Bonin was appointed as a Quebec Sessions Court judge in July 1983. In 1986, he oversaw a high-profile preliminary hearing of five persons accused of attempting to blow up Air India Flight 112. (This is not to be confused with the more prominent trials that took place concerning the destruction of Air India Flight 182.)

Bonin was later promoted to head the criminal division of the Court of Quebec in September 1988. In June 1996, he was appointed by the government of Quebec to hold a closed-door inquiry into the Sûreté du Québec (SQ), following widespread accusations of corruption in the force. The inquiry ultimately became ground down in acrimony among the various parties, and Bonin resigned in October 1996 after a burglary in his office. The government of Quebec subsequently called a public inquiry into the matter. In 1998, Bonin oversaw a preliminary hearing into charges against Canadian Hells Angels leader Maurice Boucher.

Bonin oversaw several high-profile cases in his last years. In 2004, he was the presiding judge who oversaw prominent Montreal businessman Irving Grundman's guilty plea in a municipal corruption case. Four years later, Canadian mafia leader Nicolo Rizzuto admitted before Bonin's court that he was a member of a criminal organization. As the result of a plea bargain, Rizzuto received only a suspended sentence and probation; Bonin later imposed a $209,000 fine on Rizzuto in a separate case involving tax evasion.

Bonin delivered a verdict in 2007 that recognized a small street gang as a criminal organization. This was generally regarded as reducing the threshold for achieving convictions in organized crime trials.

== Death ==
Bonin died at age sixty-eight in 2010, after suffering a heart attack while attending a conference in London, Ontario. He was remembered as an extremely hard working judge and an institution in Quebec's legal system.
