= Louise Lanctôt =

Canadian convicted kidnapper and writer (born 1947)

- Born: March 24, 1947 (age 79); Montreal, Quebec, Canada
- Education: Université du Québec à Montréal
- Occupation: writer

Louise Lanctôt (born March 24, 1947) is a Canadian convicted kidnapper and writer. Born in Montreal, Quebec, Canada, Lanctôt is a political activist for the cause of Quebec independence from Canada. Louise Lanctôt was an active member of the Rassemblement pour l'indépendance nationale political party that later merged with the Parti Québécois. She was also a member of the Front de libération du Québec (FLQ) and is the sister of convicted kidnapper Jacques Lanctôt, and was married to Jacques Cossette-Trudel who joined the FLQ with her.

During what became known as the October Crisis, as a member of the Liberation Cell, on October 5, 1970, Louise Lanctôt along with her brother Jacques Lanctôt, Yves Langlois, Nigel Hamer, and Marc Carbonneau put their plans into action. They carried out an armed abduction of James Cross, the British Trade Commissioner to Canada, from his Montreal home as part of their violent attempt to overthrow the elected government and to establish a socialist Quebec state independent of Canada.

On October 10, Chenier Cell leader Paul Rose and his brother, Jacques Rose along with Bernard Lortie and Francis Simard, kidnapped and then murdered Quebec Vice Premier and Cabinet Minister Pierre Laporte. Believing many others would follow in an uprising, the goal of the FLQ was to create an independent state based on the ideals of Fidel Castro's Cuba.

Lanctôt, with the help of her husband and other members of the "Liberation Cell," held James Cross hostage, taking his photo and sending it to police with a list of demands that included money and the release of other convicts. They advised authorities that Cross would be executed and further threats to Cross' life were delivered to several radio stations along with their demands.

Early in December 1970, police discovered the location of Louise Lanctôt and her fellow kidnappers holding James Cross. His release was negotiated and on December 3, 1970, Lanctôt with her husband and child, plus the three other known members of her cell, were granted their request for safe passage to Cuba by the Government of Canada after approval by Castro. Although Lanctôt and her friends who wanted to go to Cuba were exiled from Canada for life, they were later found in France. For four years, Louise Lanctôt lived in La Courneuve in Île-de-France.

Over the years, all of the Front de libération du Québec members wanted to return to Canada and began secret negotiations through the reigning government Parti Québécois to achieve that goal. On October 13, 1977, Quebec Premier René Lévesque announced he was considering a request for a pardon for Louise Lanctôt and her husband. Eventually, the federal government consented. On her return to Montreal on December 13, she pleaded guilty at trial and was sentenced to two years in jail for her part in the kidnapping. She was freed on parole after serving eight months, following which she received Quebec government financial assistance (just as any other citizen is eligible for) to attend the Université du Québec à Montréal, where she received a degree in communications in 1982 and continued on to doctoral studies in human sciences.

Divorced from her husband, during the times when the Parti Québécois has been in government, she has been employed by numerous Quebec government-funded institutions, including as a researcher for the Collège de Maisonneuve, the Université du Québec à Montréal, Sainte-Justine Hospital, Université de Montréal health administration department, and the "Ordre des infirmières et infirmiers du Québec".

The author of several books, Louise Lanctôt is a member of the Quebec Writers Union.
