= Jacques Cossette-Trudel =

Canadian political activist (1947–2023)

- Born: February 15, 1947
- Died: March 15, 2023 (aged 76)
- Education: Université du Québec à Montréal
- Occupations: Screenwriter, political activist

Jacques Cossette-Trudel (February 15, 1947 – March 15, 2023) was a French Canadian screenwriter and political activist who, as a 23-year-old, was a member of the FLQ (Cellule Front de Liberation du Québec). In October 1970 their cell kidnapped British diplomat James Richard Cross in Montreal, Quebec, Canada. In October 1970, Cossette-Trudel and the other members of the cell exchanged a healthy James Cross to become an exile to Cuba and later to France. Years later, after returning to Montreal, he was convicted of the offence of kidnapping and served two years time in prison. He since worked as a communication counselor and filmmaker in Quebec until his death in 2023.

== Early years and education ==
Cossette-Trudel was born on February 15, 1947. While a student at the Université du Québec à Montréal, he became active in left-wing politics with the Groupe Marxiste Revolutionnaire, a Quebec-based part of The Waffle, a radical wing of Canada's New Democratic Party. In May 1968, he was deeply involved in Montreal in the organization of the student movement for the democratization of the education system. Soon after, Cossette-Trudel's views became more extreme and he joined the Front de libération du Québec, whose members were responsible for a decade of radical manifestos, bombings and armed robberies in the Province of Quebec.

While still a student, he met and married another leftist, Louise Lanctôt. During what became known as the October Crisis, as the leader of the FLQ's Liberation Cell, on October 5, 1970, Jacques Cossette-Trudel along with his wife Louise, her brother Jacques Lanctôt, Yves Langlois, Nigel Hamer, and Marc Carbonneau abducted James Cross, the British Trade Commissioner, from his Montreal home, demanding the release of 27 convicted FLQ militants and the publication of the group's political manifesto. The Government of Canada, at the invitation of the Quebec provincial government, responded with the adoption of the War Measures Act. Under this law, 500 citizens were jailed and 10,000 Canadian soldiers were deployed on the streets of Montreal. Believing many of their fellow citizens would join an uprising, the goal of the FLQ was to create an independent socialist state based on the ideals of Fidel Castro's Cuba and the Algerian revolution.

Early in December 1970, police discovered the location of Cossette-Trudel's Liberation Cell hideout. The safe release of their hostage, Cross, was negotiated and on December 3, 1970, after Cossette-Trudel, his wife, and the other known members of his cell were granted safe passage to Cuba, with approval from Fidel Castro, Cross was released.

== Exile ==
Jacques Cossette-Trudel and his wife remained in Cuba for four years. They worked as volunteers for the Cuban press agency Prensa Latina. Their son, Alexis Cossette-Trudel, was born in 1972. In 1974, they moved to France as political asylum seekers. Although asylum was refused, they were permitted to remain in France. Their second child, Marie-Ange Cossette-Trudel, was born in France in 1974.

== Conviction and imprisonment ==
On October 13, 1977, Quebec Premier René Lévesque announced he was seeking a pardon for Jacques Cossette-Trudel and his wife. The Government of Canada consented to their return and put them on trial. On December 13, 1978, they pleaded guilty at trial in Montreal and were sentenced to five years' probation and two years in a provincial jail for their part in the kidnapping and attempted extortion. They were freed on parole after serving eight months.

== After prison ==
Since divorced from his wife, Jacques Cossette-Trudel has made a living as a communication counsellor in provincial health and social institutions. Since 2000, he has been a successful screenwriter and filmmaker and has received financial assistance from Téléfilm Canada and the Sodec for his work.

According to a 2000 interview he gave to Radio-Canada television, Jacques Cossette-Trudel has always stayed very connected politically and still believed in an independent, multicultural and socialist state of Quebec.

Cossette-Trudel died on March 14, 2023, at the age of 76.

== Sources ==
- Nobody said no: the real story about how the Mounties always get their man
- F.L.Q.: the anatomy of an underground movement - Page 213
- Crimes of the secret police - Page 27
