= Pierre Pascau =

Mauritian-Canadian journalist

- Born: 10 May 1938; Mauritius
- Died: 28 February 2017 (aged 78); Brisbane, Australia
- Education: Guildhall School of Music and Drama
- Occupation: Journalist

Pierre Pascau (10 May 1938 – 28 February 2017) was a Mauritian-Canadian journalist.

== Early life and career ==
Pascau was born in 1938 in Mauritius. At the age of nineteen he joined the Mauritius Broadcasting Service. For his work at the MBS, Pascau was awarded a three-year scholarship to the Guildhall School of Music and Drama. While at Guildhall, he worked as a freelance reporter for the British Home Office.

== Canadian broadcasting career ==
=== Early work ===
In 1965, Pascau moved to Montreal, where he established himself as the host of a popular call-in talk show. He also worked as a reporter for CBC Radio's Cross Country Checkup and CBC Television's Hourglass. He later moved to CFCF-TV, Montreal's CTV affiliate. While in Montreal, Pascau established himself as one of the city's leading investigative reporters.

During the October Crisis Pascau, who was then working for CKLM, was contacted by the members of the Front de libération du Québec (FLQ) responsible for kidnapping British diplomat James Cross and served as an intermediary between them and the government.

In 1974, Pascau was chosen to co-host Canada AM. According to co-host Helen Hutchinson, Pascau was "all wrong" for the job because as someone who did not grow up in the country, he "couldn't ad-lib all sorts of facts about Canada to keep the conversation going". He was replaced by Norm Perry in 1975.

=== CKAC ===
Pascau then moved to CKAC, where he hosted L'Informateur, a midday show that combined phone calls and interviews. L'Informateur spent ten years as the highest rated show in Montreal and attracted many politicians and newsmakers. He also gained a reputation as a "fiery Quebec nationalist". In May 1990, Pascau suddenly left the station, citing an ongoing dispute with fellow CKAC personality Suzanne Levesque. Pascau, a non-smoker, was upset that Levesque smoked in the studio while hosting the program that preceded his. However, station management claimed that Pascau was using this as an excuse to leave the station for CKVL. He was replaced by André Arthur.

=== CKVL ===
In June 1990, Pascau began hosting Le Point du Jour, a three-hour morning program on CKVL. Unlike L'Informateur, Le Point du Jour contained news, weather, sports, and traffic reports in addition to phone calls and interviews. Crime reporter Claude Poirier and La Presse sports columnist Rejean Tremblay contributed to the show. In 1996, Raymond Villeneuve, the leader of the Mouvement de Libération Nationale du Québec, made some extreme comments against Jews and anglophones, including that bombs or Molotov cocktails could be used against Anglophone activist Howard Galganov. The interview led Alliance Quebec to file a complaint with the Canadian Radio-television and Telecommunications Commission, which ruled that Pascau almost stepped over the line when he urged Villeneuve to repeat warnings about firebombings against Jews, but they fell just short of "the line of acceptable comment in a democratic society". On 2 May 1997, Pascau left CKVL at the end of his contract. According to station general manager Pierre Arcand, Pascau tired of waking up at 4 a.m. to do his morning show and had become disillusioned by the trend of politicians bypassing serious interviews in favour of photo ops and appearances on lighter shows. His final program included tributes from Roger Landry, Liza Frulla, and Francois Bourassa, who recalled his father, Robert Bourassa's, admiration for Pascau's interview skills. He was replaced by Jean-François Bertrand.

== Retirement ==
After leaving broadcasting, Pascau left Canada for Australia to live his final years in Brisbane, where he died in 2017.
