= Time bomb =

Explosive device whose detonation is triggered by a timer

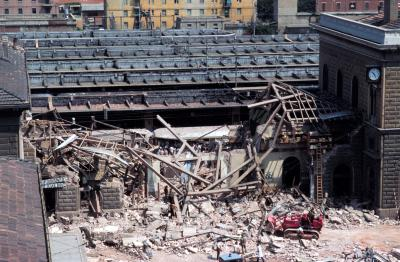
Aftermath of the bombing at the Bologna railway station in August 1980 which killed 85 people, the deadliest event during the Years of Lead.

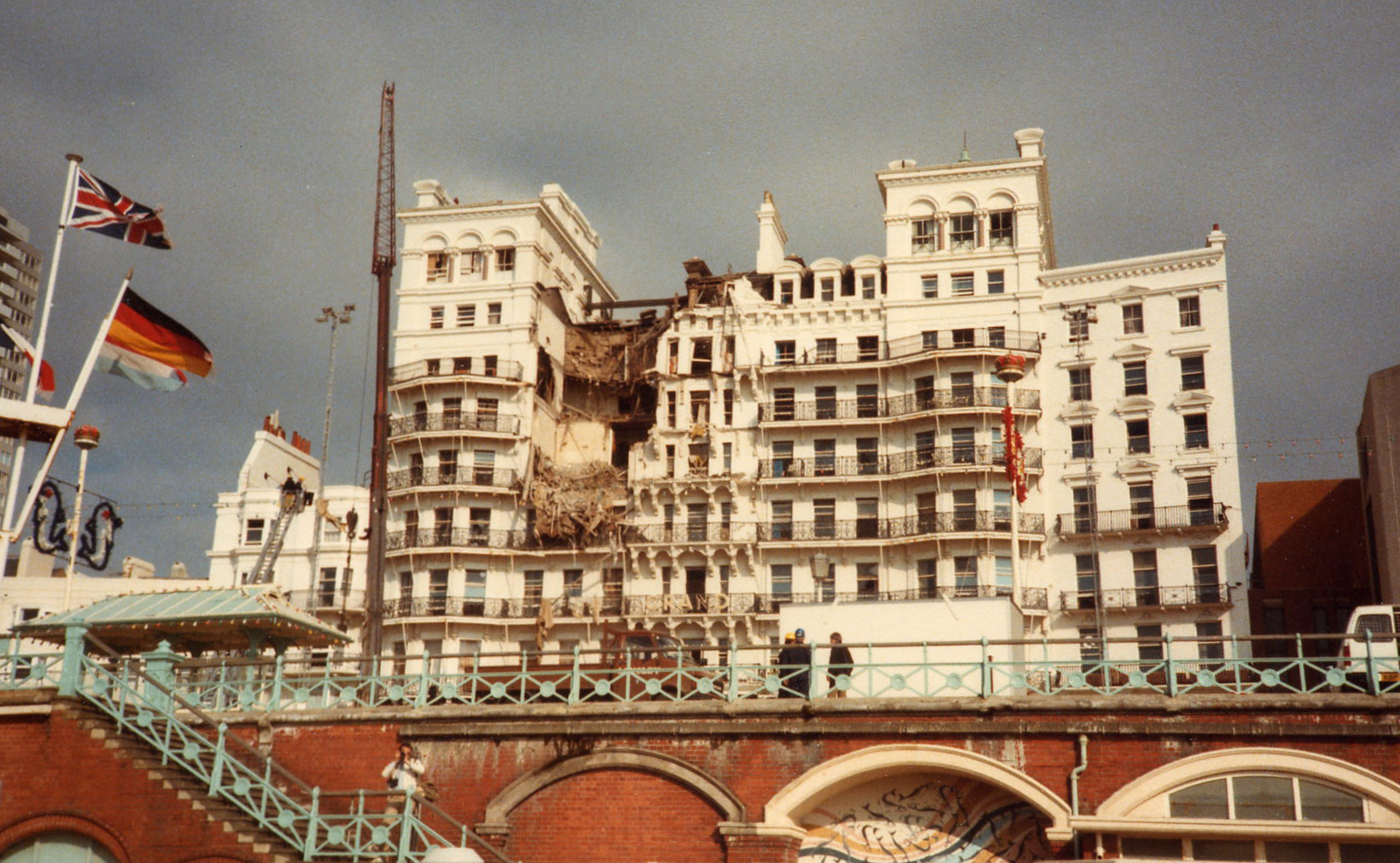
Aftermath of the Grand Hotel bombing in Brighton (1984) which was targeted at British Prime Minister Margaret Thatcher, the result of a time bomb which had been placed in the hotel nearly a month before it detonated. Thatcher wasn't harmed, but five others were killed and 31 were injured.

A time bomb (also known as a timebomb or time-bomb) is a bomb whose detonation is triggered by a timer. The use or attempted use of time bombs has been for various purposes including insurance fraud, terrorism, assassination, sabotage and warfare. They are a frequent plot device in thriller and action films as they offer a way of imparting a dramatic sense of urgency.

== Construction ==
Diagram of a simple time bomb in the form of a pipe bomb

The explosive charge is the main component of any bomb, and makes up most of the size and weight of it. It is the damaging element of the bomb (along with any fragments or shrapnel the explosion might produce with its container or neighboring objects). The explosive charge is detonated by a detonator.

A time bomb's timing mechanism may be professionally manufactured either separately or as part of the device, or it may be improvised from an ordinary household timer such as a wind-up alarm clock, wrist watch, digital kitchen timer, or notebook computer. The timer can be programmed to count up or count down (usually the latter; as the bomb detonates when the time runs out).

== Types ==
Types of time bombs include:

- Delay-action bomb (bombs dropped by aircraft with a delay to increase damage/disruption)
- Improvised explosive device ("home-made" bombs with a delay to allow the person placing the bomb to escape)
- Limpet mine (attached to enemy ships by naval divers)

== List of notable incidents involving time bombs ==
Year	Event	Location	Perpetrator(s)	Deaths	Injuries	Comments
1776	Turtle submarine attack on the Eagle	New York Harbor, United States	Ezra Lee and David Bushnell	0	0	David Bushnell designed the Turtle submarine using a clockwork time bomb crafted by Isaac Doolittle that would attach to the hull of the British ship the Eagle using a screw, but the screw failed to penetrate the hull. The time bomb was released and eventually exploded causing great noise but no harm to the British.
1864	Confederate sabotage of Gen. Ulysses S. Grant's headquarters	City Point, Virginia, US	John Maxwell of the Confederate Secret Service	43 to 300	125	Maxwell called his device a "clockwork torpedo"; placed on an ammunition barge, it detonated 30,000 artillery shells
1875	Attack on the Mosel (ship)	Bremerhaven, Germany	Alexander Keith, Jr.	80 or 83	200	Bomb set for insurance fraud purposes; detonated prematurely
1880	Winter Palace bombing	Saint Petersburg, Russia	Narodnaya Volya	11	30	Attempted assassination of Tsar Alexander II
1881–1885	Fenian dynamite campaign	Great Britain	Fenians	3 (bombers who died when bomb went off early)	100	Irish nationalist campaign led by Jeremiah O'Donovan Rossa
1905	Yıldız assassination attempt	Constantinople, Ottoman Empire	Edward Joris	26	58	Failed assassination attempted on Abdul Hamid II
1910	Los Angeles Times bombing	Los Angeles, US	John J. McNamara and James B. McNamara	21	100	Union-related action
1915	Muenter attack spree	Washington, D.C., New York City	German nationalist Eric Muenter	0	1	Set time bombs in United States Capitol, SS Minnehaha, and shot J. P. Morgan, Jr. against selling arms to Germany's enemies
1915	Pencil bomb attacks	New York City, Atlantic Ocean	Abteilung III b, German intelligence	36 ships damaged or sunk		Series of incendiary time bombs planted aboard ships transporting war materiel from New York to Europe
1916	Preparedness Day Bombing	San Francisco, US	Labor leaders	10	40	Isolationist political action
1920	Wall Street bombing	New York City, US	Anarchists (suspected)	38	400	Followed other bombings in 1919
1939	Bürgerbräukeller	Munich, Germany	Georg Elser	7	63	Assassination attempt on Adolf Hitler
1942	St Nazaire Raid	St Nazaire, France (wartime)	Royal Navy, British commandos	590	unknown	To damage port facilities being used by enemy forces
1944	July Plot	Wolf's Lair, Poland (wartime)	German resistance to Nazism	4	?	Failed assassination attempt on Adolf Hitler
1949	Canadian Pacific Air Lines Flight 108	Over Cap Tourmente, Canada	Albert Guay	23	0	Murder; insurance fraud
1955	United Airlines Flight 629	Over Longmont, Colorado, US	Jack Gilbert Graham	44	0	Murder; insurance fraud
1956	Milk Bar, Place Bugeaud, Cafeteria, Rue Michelet, Air France office (failed to detonate)	Algiers, French Algeria	Djamila Bouhired; Zohra Drif; Samia Lakhdari	3	50	Reprisal bombings at start of the Algerian War, September 30, 1956 Part of the so-called Café Wars
1963-1971	FLQ bombings	Canada	Front de libération du Québec	None	1 (Army officer Walter Leja)	Series of politically motivated bombings (timed and non-timed devices) and other activities
1969-1976	Weatherman bombings	United States	Weather Underground	1 unconfirmed; 3 bombers (premature)	3 confirmed; 1 unconfirmed	Series of politically motivated bombings (timed and non-timed devices) and other activities including jailbreaks and riots
1972	Aldershot bombing	Aldershot, United Kingdom	Official IRA	7	18	A 280 lb time bomb in a car
1972 - 1973	1972 and 1973 Dublin bombings	Dublin, Ireland	Ulster Volunteer Force	3	185	Part of anti-Irish nationalism campaign
1972	Belturbet bombing	Cavan, Ireland	Ulster Volunteer Force	2	8	Part of anti-Irish nationalism campaign
1973	1973 Old Bailey bombing	London, UK	IRA	1	220	Continuing anti-British campaign
1974	M62 coach bombing	West Riding of Yorkshire	Provisional IRA	12	38	Continuing anti-British campaign
1974	1974 Mitsubishi Heavy Industries bombing	Tokyo, Japan	East Asia Anti-Japan Armed Front	8	376	Targeted against "Japanese imperialism" and "its colonist"
1974	Dublin and Monaghan bombings	Dublin and Monaghan, Ireland	Ulster Volunteer Force	34	300	4 time bombs in car bombs Part of anti-Irish Nationalism campaign. Biggest loss of life from an attack during the Northern Ireland Troubles.
1974	Birmingham pub bombings	Birmingham, UK	IRA (suspected)	21	182	Continuing anti-British campaign
1974	Guildford pub bombings	Guildford, UK	IRA	5	65	Targeted against Army personnel
1975	Donnelly's Bar and Kay's Tavern attacks	Dundalk, Ireland	Ulster Volunteer Force	2	21	Part of anti-Irish nationalism campaign (1st part of double attack)
1976	Hillcrest Bar bombing	Dungannon, County Tyrone, Northern Ireland	Ulster Volunteer Force	4	50	Part of anti-Irish nationalism campaign
1976	Castleblayney bombing	Monaghan, Ireland	Ulster Volunteer Force	1	17	Part of anti-Irish nationalism campaign
1977	Lucona sinking	Indian Ocean	Udo Proksch	6	6	Attempted insurance fraud
1982	Droppin Well bombing	Ballykelly, County Londonderry, NI	Irish National Liberation Army INLA	17	30	Bombing against British soldiers
1984	Brighton hotel bombing	Brighton, UK	IRA	5	31	Attempt to assassinate PM Margaret Thatcher
1985	Sinking of the Rainbow Warrior	Auckland, New Zealand	French DGSE	1	0	Two limpet mines, set to detonate 10 minutes apart
1985	Air India Flight 182 and 1985 Narita International Airport bombing	Atlantic Ocean, Tokyo Narita Airport	Babbar Khalsa Khalistan separatists	331	4	Bombing of two 747 flights with alarm clock and dynamite hidden in radio tuner
1987	Korean Air Flight 858	Andaman Sea	North Korea	115 (all)	0	State terrorism against South Korea
1987	Remembrance Day bombing	Enniskillen, NI	IRA	12	63	Continuing anti-British campaign
1988	Pan Am flight 103	Above Lockerbie, Scotland	Libya	270	0	Reprisal against UK & US
1989	Deal barracks bombing	Deal, Kent, UK	IRA	11	21	Targeted against military personnel
1993	World Trade Center bombing	New York City, US	Ramzi Yousef	6	1,042	Truck bomb used 20 ft fuse for twelve-minute delay, intended to collapse both towers.
1994	Philippine Airlines Flight 434	Between Cebu and Tokyo, Japan	Ramzi Yousef	1	10	Blast missed fuel tank, killed one passenger and damaged control systems but pilot was able to land. Yousef bombed World Trade Center in 1993
1995	Oklahoma City bombing	Oklahoma City, US	Timothy McVeigh	168	800	Deadliest domestic terrorist attack in the United States.
1996	Centennial Olympic Park bombing	Atlanta, Georgia, US	Eric Rudolph	1	111	Politically motivated anti-abortionist; occurred during 1996 Summer Olympics.
1998	Omagh bombing	Omagh, NI	Real IRA	29	220	Worst single incident loss of life of the anti-British campaign.
1999	Columbine High School massacre	Columbine, Colorado, US	Eric Harris and Dylan Klebold	15	24	Bombs did not explode, and were not the cause of any of the deaths or injuries.
1999	Russian apartment bombings	Buynaksk; Moscow; Volgodonsk, Russia	Chechen rebels led by Khattab (suspected)	293	651	4 bombs over 4 days; purpose unknown.
2003	Murder of Brian Wells	Erie, Pennsylvania, US	Marjorie Diehl-Armstrong; Kenneth Barnes	1		Silence witness to forced bank robbery; timed body bomb
2006	Moscow market bombing	Moscow, Russia	Racialist organization	13	46	Racially motivated attack

== See also ==
- Fuse (explosives)
- Ticking time bomb scenario (hypothetical justification of torture)
- Software time bomb
