= Mario Bachand =

Québécois nationalist (1944–1971)

- Born: 24 March 1944; Montreal, Canada
- Died: 29 March 1971 (aged 27); St. Ouen, France
- Cause of death: Assassination
- Occupation: Revolutionary
- Allegiance: Quebec Liberation Front: Liberation Cell
- Criminal charges: Terrorist activities and attempted murder

François Mario Bachand (March 24, 1944 – March 29, 1971) was a member of the first (1963) wave of the FLQ (Front de libération du Québec).

== Political history ==
Mario Bachand was a member of the Front de Liberation du Quebec, imprisoned for his role in planting bombs in Montreal. On 17 May 1963 a bomb crippled Walter Leja, a Canadian army explosives technician. After his release, Bachand remained politically active in Montreal, founding several activist, leftist movements. He was an effective organizer, and was largely responsible for organizing the McGill-français demonstration of March 1969. He was close friends with Jacques Lanctôt, who in 1970 would lead the Liberation Cell in the kidnapping of British diplomat James Cross, the event that initiated the October Crisis. Bachand had earlier fled Canada to avoid another criminal prosecution.

Bachand and Lanctôt were close friends with a young man born in France, Richard Bros. On 22 November 1970, during the October Crisis, days before the Liberation Cell released their hostage, Bros would die in a London police cell, reportedly a suicide. In April 1969 Bachand fled to Havana, where he met up with other FLQ who had sought refuge in Cuba, including Pierre Charette, Alain Allard and Raymond Villeneuve. Bachand was very much a socialist, and did not view Quebec nationalism, particularly its Parti Québécois manifestation, very positively. This brought him in conflict with certain other FLQ who were more sovereigntist, such as Raymond Villeneuve and Denis Lamoureux.

== Death ==
In June 1970 he left Cuba for Paris. He was found shot to death in the apartment of Pierre Barral and his wife, Françoise, in the Paris suburb of St. Ouen on March 29, 1971, following a cous cous lunch with them and Norman Roy and Denyse Leduc of the DEFLQ (Delegation extérierure du FLQ). Bachand was assassinated by 3 shots from a .22 calibre pistol with a silencer.

Bachand's murder has never been solved. Author Michael McLoughlin has asserted that Bachand was killed by Normand Roy and Denyse Leduc, assisted by the Security and Intelligence branch of the Royal Canadian Mounted Police or RCMP Security Service.

In 2020, filmmaker Félix Rose released Le dernier felquiste, a television documentary miniseries about Bachand's murder, for Club Illico.
