= Cossette =

Cossette may refer to:

In people:

- Jacques Cossette-Trudel (born 1947), convicted terrorist, Quebec separatist (FLQ), communication counsellor and filmmaker
- Marie-Andrée Cossette (born 1946), Canadian artist
- Pierre Cossette (producer) (born 1923), a TV executive producer and Broadway producer
- Sylvain Cossette (born 1963), a Canadian singer-songwriter

In other uses:

- Le Portrait de Petit Cossette, a manga and anime series
- A by-product of sugar-beet processing (thin strips of sugar-beet), see Sugar beet

== See also ==
- Cosette, a fictional character from the novel, Les Misérables
- Princess Rosa Cossette D'Elise, a fictional character from the video game Ace Combat 7: Skies Unknown
