= Bachand =

Bachand is a surname. Notable people with the surname include:

- André Bachand (Progressive Conservative MP) (born 1961), Canadian politician, former member of the Progressive Conservative Party of Canada
- André Bachand (Liberal MP) (born 1934), Canadian politician, former member of the Liberal Party of Canada
- Claude Bachand (born 1951), Canadian politician, member of the Bloc Québécois
- Claude Bachand (MNA) (born 1956), Canadian politician, member of the Liberal Party of Quebec
- Kelly Bachand, American competitive shooter
- Mario Bachand (1944–71), member of the Front de libération du Québec
- Matt Bachand (born 1976), American guitarist, member of metal band Shadows Fall
- Pierre Bachand (1835–1878), Canadian politician
- Qristina & Quinn Bachand, Canadian brother-sister musical duo
- Raymond Bachand (born 1947), Canadian politician, Quebec provincial cabinet minister
