= Pierre-Paul Geoffroy =

Canadian Québécois sovereignty militant (1944–2025)

- Born: 25 July 1944; Berthierville, Quebec, Canada
- Died: 6 December 2025 (aged 81)
- Education: École des arts graphiques de Montréal; Collège Sainte-Marie de Montréal
- Occupation: Militant

Pierre-Paul Geoffroy (25 July 1944 – 6 December 2025) was a Canadian militant of the Rassemblement pour l'Indépendance Nationale (RIN). He was also engaged with the Front de libération du Québec (FLQ).

== Biography ==
Born in Berthierville on 25 July 1944, Geoffroy was the brother of journalist and author Jacques Geoffroy and the uncle of journalist and editor Nicolas Langelier. He joined the RIN in 1964 and became a local executive secretary while studying imprinting at the École des arts graphiques de Montréal and political science at the Collège Sainte-Marie de Montréal.

On 27 February 1968, Geoffroy was arrested and brutalized by police during a demonstration in solidarity with striking workers at a 7 Up factory. From May 1968 to March 1969, the FLQ chapter he led became notorious for several bomb attacks, including the bombing of the Tour de la Bourse on 13 February 1969, which injured 27 people. On 4 March of that year, police raided his apartment and discovered approximately 200 sticks of dynamite, 100 detonators, and two unarmed bombs. He confessed his involvement in about 15 bombings but refused to name the other members of the group, though he was accused of leading 31 bombings from 1968 to 1969. He pleaded guilty to all 129 charges against him and was sentenced to 124 life sentences, a record for the entire Commonwealth of Nations. He was one of 23 prisoners the FLQ sought in exchange for James Cross. After 12 years of incarceration, he was paroled on 15 February 1987.

Geoffroy died on 6 December 2025, at the age of 82.
