= Marc Carbonneau =

Marc Carbonneau (born 29 May 1933) was a member of the Liberation Cell of the Front de libération du Québec (FLQ).

Carbonneau, a taxi driver by profession, was active in left-wing groups in the 1950s and joined the FLQ 15 years later. On 7 October 1969, he participated in protests organized by the Movement de libération du Québec against the Murray-Hill monopoly, which would later be known as the Murray-Hill riot. During the October Crisis of 1970, he was part of the Liberation Cell of the Front de libération du Québec that kidnapped British Trade Commissioner James Cross. For this, he appeared on Canada's most wanted list on 11 November 1970. In exchange for Cross' release, Carbonneau and the other members of the group were flown into voluntary exile in Cuba. After more than 10 years living in Cuba and later France, he returned to Quebec on 25 May 1981.

Carbonneau was charged with four counts related to kidnapping. He first pleaded not guilty, then changed his plea to guilty a few months later. He was sentenced to 20 months in prison and 150 hours of community service, a lighter penalty than that of three other FLQ kidnappers who returned before he did. The sentencing judge outlined mitigating factors: Carbonneau's guilty plea, his renunciation of past actions, his progress in social reintegration, his lack of commitment to the FLQ's ideology, and his age.

In February 1956 at the age of 18, he married Huguette Carbonneau. They have four children.
