= Operation McGill français =

Street demonstration in Montreal

- Part of Quiet Revolution, the FLQ insurgency and the Cold War
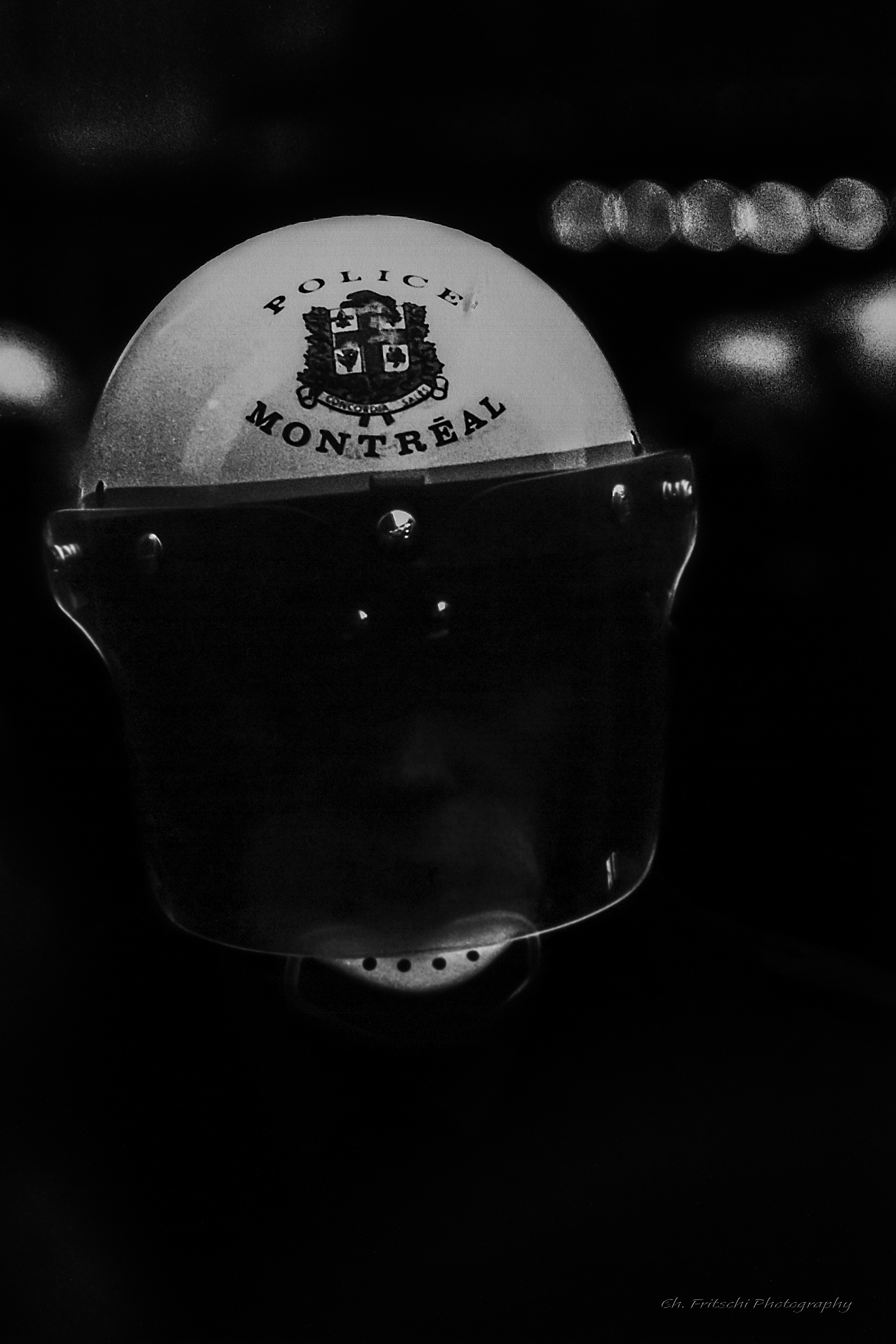
- Police officer during the protest
- Date: 28 March 1969
- Location: Montreal, Quebec, Canada
- Goals: For McGill University to become a French-speaking educational institution

Parties
Protesters: Front de libération du Québec; Students for a Democratic University; Movement for the Integration of School; CEGEP	Counter protesters: Anglophone students	Police: Service de police de la Ville de Montréal

Lead figures
Mario Bachand; Stanley Gray; Raymond Lemieux	Unorganized	Jean-Paul Gilbert

Number
10,000 – 15,000	3,000	100 on duty; 1,300 on call

Operation McGill français was a large street demonstration in Montreal, Quebec, Canada, during the Quiet Revolution. Though comprising a range of trade unionists, Quebec nationalists, students and other leftists raising many different demands (along with a small contingent from McGill's CEGEP), the protest's key objective was for McGill University to become a French-speaking educational institution. The demonstration took place in Montreal on March 28, 1969 in the midst of Quebec's Quiet Revolution. On this day, approximately 10,000–15,000 protesters, gathered and walked down Sherbrooke street towards the Roddick Gates calling for McGill University to become Francophone, along with pro-worker and nationalist demands. These protesters held signs that read slogans such as "McGill aux Québécois!" and "McGill aux travailleurs", which translates to "McGill to Quebecers" and "McGill to workers" respectively.

Afraid this demonstration might turn violent, 100 police officers were deployed as well as 1,300 police officers on call. Also awaiting the demonstrators at the Roddick Gates were 3,000 spectators. The demonstration was mostly peaceful, with some altercations taking place between demonstration supporters and some anglophone students who responded to the demonstration by chanting "God Save the Queen".

== Background ==
The political agenda of this demonstration largely coincided with the current of Quebec nationalist ideology that emphasised decolonisation and the construction of a socialist Francophone-dominated Quebec, especially that espoused in the political review Parti Pris. Those taking part in Opération McGill saw McGill University as a key symbol of Anglo-Saxon power in Quebec and the idea to "francise" the university coincided with the larger aim of decolonizing Quebec. Though the call to turn McGill into a French-speaking university was very popular symbolically within the far-left of the Quebec nationalist movement, there was a much broader political consensus around the need to create a network of public francophone higher educational establishments to redress both the linguistic imbalance in higher education and the lack of access for Francophone students (at the time, only three of the six publicly supported universities were French-speaking, while all universities were still privately run), something which came to fruition less than a month after "Operation McGill" with the establishment of the Université du Québec à Montréal (UQAM) as the flagship metropolitan university within the public francophone University of Quebec network. Leading the charge of this demonstration were former McGill professor Stanley Gray and nationalist Raymond Lemieux who spoke to the crowd of people demanding equal rights for francophones and also demanded that McGill become a francophone educational institution.

Prior to the demonstration, key demonstrator, Stanley Gray was fired from his position as a political science professor at McGill University in 1969. However, prior to his firing, he had established a group named the Students for a Democratic University (SDU) on November 23, 1967. It consisted of 150 students and professors who were also in favour of the idea of decolonisation and instituting more power to French people not only at McGill but throughout Quebec as well. The SDU had begun many demonstrations, with each getting larger than the previous one. During the early months of 1969, before the operation, Gray and the other members of the SDU had interrupted a Senate meeting on January 24, 1969 echoing similar chants such as "Revolution", "Long live the Socialist Quebec" and "Long live Quebec". The group would then again take similar actions on January 27, 1969 when they impeded a meeting of the Assembly of the Board of Governors. Later, the SDU would be renamed as the Radical Student Association (RSA). Gray was also a founding member of the Movement for the Integration of School (MIS), who organised the demonstration on that day. The SDU and the MIS would work together for the same goals.

Another key member of the MIS was Raymond Lemieux, an American with French-Canadian heritage. He, along with fellow founding member Stanley Gray would gather approximately 3,000 members leading up to the demonstration. The MIS would then strengthen the Saint-Léonard crisis when elected on June 28, 1968. The Saint-Léonard crisis largely developed from leftist thinking which disallowed bilingual classes and adopted only unilingual French classes.

The campus newspaper, the McGill Daily, also supported the cause heavily and distributed a special edition announcing the preparation of Operation McGill with 100,000 copies instead of its usual 14,000 copies. In it was a document titled "Welcome to McGill" written entirely in French and sent across the province of Quebec with the aid of students and the members of the major trade union in Québec, the CSN. In short, the document criticized the ruling elites of Quebec and argued that the people of Quebec were exploited both culturally and economically. Concluding the article was the need to democratise McGill for these reasons and why workers, students and anyone who felt discriminated against should demonstrate.

On March 26, 1969 activists Raymond Lemieux, Stanley Gray, Léandre Bergeron and CSN president Michael Chartrand stated that they would be talking about the Operation via posters throughout campus which would be held in the ballroom of the University Centre.

== In the context of the Quiet Revolution ==
The Quiet Revolution, also known as La révolution tranquille, spanned roughly from 1960-1970 in Quebec, Canada. The Revolution began when Jean Lesage, leader of the Liberal party, was elected on June 22, 1960 winning 51% of the popular vote. The Liberal Party of Quebec's manifesto called for a number of important changes to modernise Quebec society after Maurice Duplessis's, and prior reigns, including the creation of a modern welfare state (including guaranteed education, healthcare and income support), the intervention by the state in the economy, an Office of the French Language, as well as several proposals that would go on to form the cornerstone of Quebec-Canada relations (inter-provincial conferences, a Minister for Provincial-Federal Affairs). The beginning of the Quiet Revolution also saw the birth of the Women's Liberation Movement and Black Power Movement in Quebec, along with the ever-increasing influence and power of both the trade union movement and the modern Quebec nationalist movement, heavily influenced by leftist ideology. Operation McGill included or connected with all of these movements.

=== Student movements ===
Francophone students did not fare well in the large scale of Quebec's education system. Very few Francophones were allowed into universities where a large percentage was Anglophone. Only 7% of McGill students had French as their mother tongue while the percentage of French-speaking people was 82%. Students who had English as their mother tongue accounted for 42% of university enrollments in Quebec which in greater context is higher compared to the 18% of students for the provincial population. In a time of increasing awareness and discontent with the economic and social inequalities between Quebec's Anglophone and Francophone communities, the lack of educational opportunities was seen as a key issue.

Motivated by the discrepancies in educational provision and general economic inequality, several student movements adopted leftist thinking such as l'Union générale des étudiants (UGEQ). The UGEQ united the many other student bodies in Quebec, 1964 and would go on to form many student movements which the leaders of the Operation did consider as motivation. In the latter half of 1968, the UGEQ picked up its radical agenda. The CEGEP system was created to expand post-secondary education and these junior colleges were established throughout Quebec. However, these colleges were seen by many as insufficient and as recreating the inequalities within the university sector. In October, Quebec government officials declared that about 20,000 students of the CEGEP system would not be allowed the opportunity to study at a university level come the following school year. This led to about 5,000 to 10,000 students protesting this affair on October 21, 1968 shouting "étudiants ouvriers" and demanding the allowance of a better education for the students under this system. Many student groups decided at this time that conciliation with the government was no longer a viable option, and direct actions and more radical demands became more important.

Although a portion of those attending and organising the demonstration had the goal of a general improvement in Quebec's higher educational system, some groups used it to call attention to the perceived notion that McGill University was directly influencing American Imperialism and thus, allowing discrimination against the French people. This not only affected the student movement but also all the other movements during the Quiet Revolution as well the fight against racism, to the workers movement and ending with the Women's Liberation Movement. Thus, Operation McGill français was part of a greater effort during the Quiet Revolution to incorporate better education and social equality.

==== Connection to the Parti Pris ====
The journal, 'Parti Pris', also began around this time in 1963. Two scholars named Jean-Marc Piotte and André Major were attempting to fight for the equality of the French-Canadian population of Quebec (soon to be known as "les Québécois"). One of their key aims was to create a common fight for the decolonisation of Quebec, with the articles analysing the cultural, social and economic conditions in Quebec through the lens of decolonisation connected with the establishment of a socialist political programme. This journal contributed to the creation of a new political language during the early 1960s. The leaders of Parti Pris also organized discussions, street protests, public meetings and reading groups. The political movements participating in McGill were closely aligned with the objectives and ideas espoused by the authors in Parti Pris.

==== Connection to the Sir George Williams affair ====
Just a couple of months prior to Operation McGill was another large protest known as the Sir George Williams affair. This was a protest in regards to Quebec's discrimination towards its black citizens when 6 black students argued racial discrimination from then assistant professor of biology, Mr. Perry Anderson. Much like the rest of the workers, feminist and student movements, the citizens involved in the Black Power movement felt like they were not being heard. In response to the administration's lack of action, 200 students and protesters peacefully overtook the ninth floor of the Hall building of Sir George Williams University on January 29, 1969. They overtook the computer centre and stayed there until February 11 when they were forcefully taken by police officers after starting a fire to keep around 30 police officers out. Nevertheless, the police officers were successful in detaining and arresting 96 students involved in the affair. It may just be considered the largest school riot in Canadian history.

The Sir George Williams affair would turn violent with over 2 million dollars' worth of damage to computers and the school, though the initial intention was to remain peaceful. This affair led to other school protests throughout Quebec which included Operation McGill.

Both student bodies used their own respective newspapers, The Georgian and The McGill Daily to gain support for their causes.

=== Workers movements ===
Quebec's economy in the 1960s and prior was largely ruled by Anglophone elites. Francophones were not happy with this arrangement, since the vast majority of the population were French speakers. Anglophones and Francophones often lived in different conditions with the Anglophones living in wealthy areas and the Francophones living in the poorer areas. Anglophones consisted of 56% of Montreal's best-paid workers and only consisted of about 24% of the labor force. Furthermore, Francophones only controlled 20% of the economy and also represented 40% of Canada's total unemployment rate. Even though they lived in a French province, a large percentage were being forced to learn English to be able to work and almost half the time, workers were required to speak to their managers in English. During the early years of the Revolution (1961-1965), there was an average of about 67.6 strikes per year. In the later years (1966-1970), this number nearly doubled to 143 strikes per year. During these strikes, workers argued against poor housing conditions, unemployment, price increases and discrimination.

To change this, leftist parties engaging in nationalist ideas started organising worker movements. Such movements were led by the then-president of the CSN, Marcel Pepin. In 1966, Pepin would go on to change the situation with his 'moral report', which would then go on to explain the urgency for multiple worker movements and if need be, a call for arms and further resistance. This would later influence those involved in the October Crisis and members of the CSN to revolt in Operation McGill. Leftist thinkers believed that the French population as a whole had a right to defend themselves, and this did not exclude workers.

Examples of this led to many groups such as the Mouvement de libération du taxi, citizens' and workers' committees, the Chevaliers de l'indépendance, the Comité Vallières-Gagnon and the Montreal Central Council of the CSN assisting the MIS coalition gaining over 50,000 supporters. The CSN and MIS coalition would support the Operation showing how the demonstration was acting in the context of allowing better work for the Francophone people. It would try to allow the use of French to expand in the workplace instead of English, which demonstrated power over the French people much like McGill had.

== McGill University today ==
Today, McGill University continues to be one of three English universities in Quebec. However, today the student body is approximately 20.3% Francophone. This is a significant increase over the Francophone student body during the Quiet Revolution that consisted of approximately 3%. Students now have the option to submit work in either English or French even though the language of instruction continues to be predominantly English.
