= Mouvement de libération nationale du Québec =

Secessionist group in Quebec, Canada

- MLNQ flag
- Leader: Raymond Villeneuve
- Dates active: 1995–?
- Active regions: Quebec, Canada
- Ideology: Quebec sovereigntism
- Status: Defunct

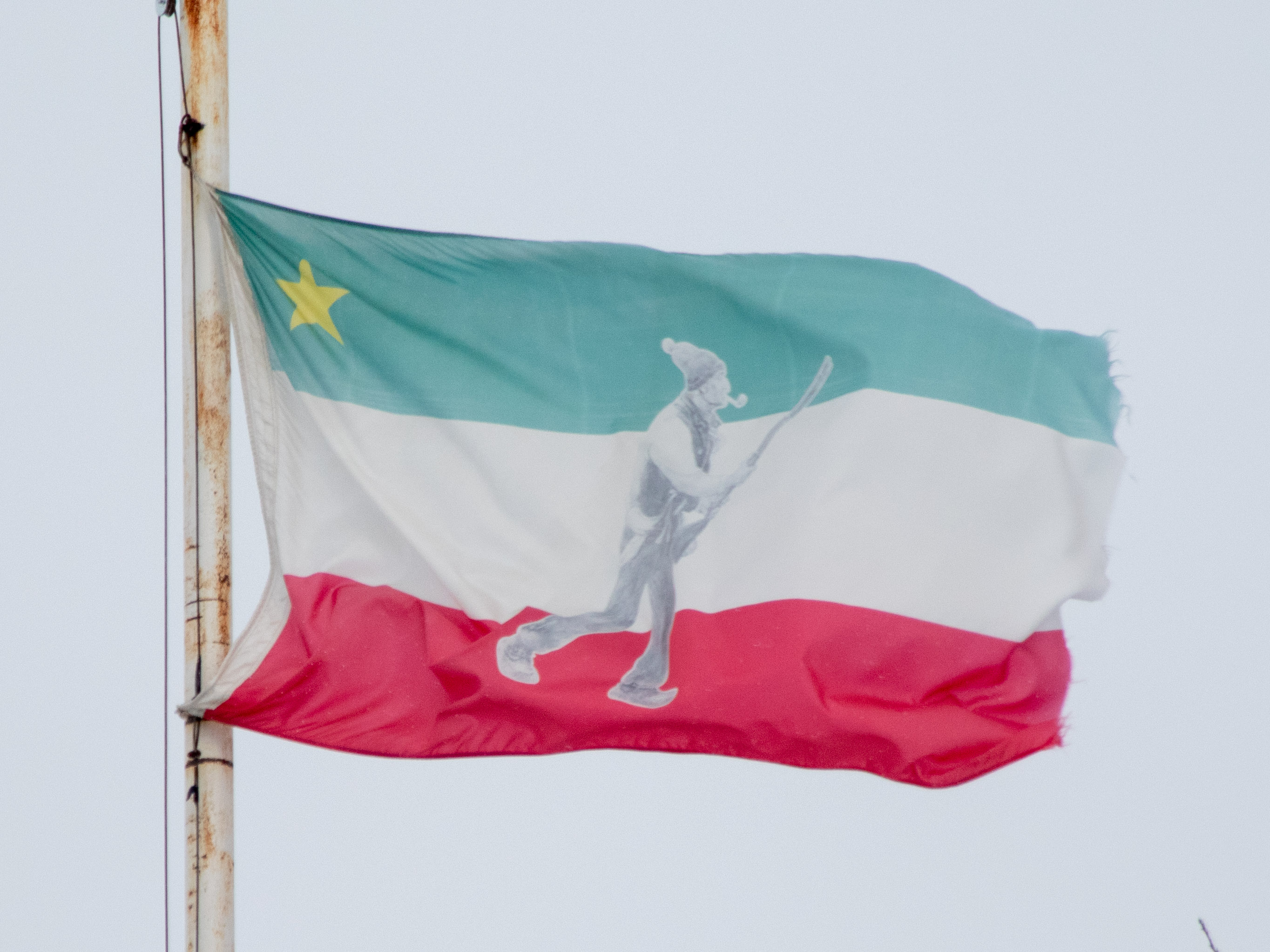
The MLNQ flag flying in Sainte-Madeleine, Quebec.

The Mouvement de libération nationale du Québec (MLNQ) was a secessionist group in Quebec, Canada, founded (in the wake of the 1995 referendum on Quebec sovereignty) by Front de libération du Québec (FLQ) founder, Raymond Villeneuve. The MLNQ vows to "fight until the end for Quebec independence", "intends to favour a revolutionary struggle to free the people", "intends to favour the emergence of a people's militia", and overall intends to pursue independence by "any necessary and inevitable means", according to their manifesto. Most common sightings of MLNQ occurred during Canada Day in Quebec City during the raising of the Canadian flag.

== Supporters ==
Supporters of the MLNQ included Pierre Falardeau (deceased 2009).

== See also ==
- Réseau de Résistance du Québécois
