= Georges Schoeters =

Marxist Revolutionary (1930–1994)

- Born: 22 April 1930; Antwerp, Belgium
- Died: 26 May 1994 (aged 64); Stockholm, Sweden
- Occupation: Revolutionary
- Allegiance: Quebec Liberation Front
- Motive: Creation of an independent socialist Quebec state
- Criminal charges: Terrorist activities and murder

George Schoeters (22 April 1930 – 26 May 1994) was one of the founders and a leader of the Quebec Liberation Front (FLQ) militant group in 1963. During World War II, Schoeters worked as a courier for the Belgian Resistance, thus beginning his clandestine career.

Born in Antwerp, Belgium, Schoeters emigrated to Montreal, Quebec, Canada in 1951 where he signed up for courses at the Université de Montréal and as a left-wing activist, recruited others on campus. A person who supported the idea of armed revolution, in the late 1950s he went to Algeria for training with the National Liberation Front (FLN). In the early 1960s, he joined the Rally for National Independence (RIN), a Quebec political organization dedicated to the promotion of Quebec independence from Canada. Through RIN, Schoeters met Raymond Villeneuve and Gabriel Hudon, left-wing radicals who supported his belief in armed revolution.

An admirer of Fidel Castro and Che Guevara, Schoeters made repeated visits to Cuba through the Institute of Agrarian Reform in the early 1960s. Returning to Quebec Georges Schoeters, Raymond Villeneuve, and Gabriel Hudon formed the FLQ. The group's declarations called for a Marxist insurrection, the overthrow of the Quebec government, the independence of Quebec from Canada and the establishment of a workers' society. Financed by armed bank robberies, Schoeters and members of the FLQ launched a campaign of repeated bombings in the city of Montreal and resulted in the accidental death of a night watchman.

While Schoeters was arrested on June 16, 1963, and convicted of "terrorist activities", the Crown Attorney was unable to gather sufficient evidence to convict him of murder as was done with others such as Raymond Villeneuve and Gabriel Hudon. Schoeters was quoted, following his arrest as saying "When I was fourteen years old, I was made prisoner by the Germans, but they treated me better than the Montreal police". Sentenced to two five-year terms, to run concurrently, Schoeters was released in 1966 after serving less than three years in prison. He immediately left Canada and never returned.

Schoeters lived for several years in Stockholm, Sweden, where he committed suicide on 26 May 1994.
