= Tour de la Bourse =

Office skyscraper in Montreal, Quebec, Canada

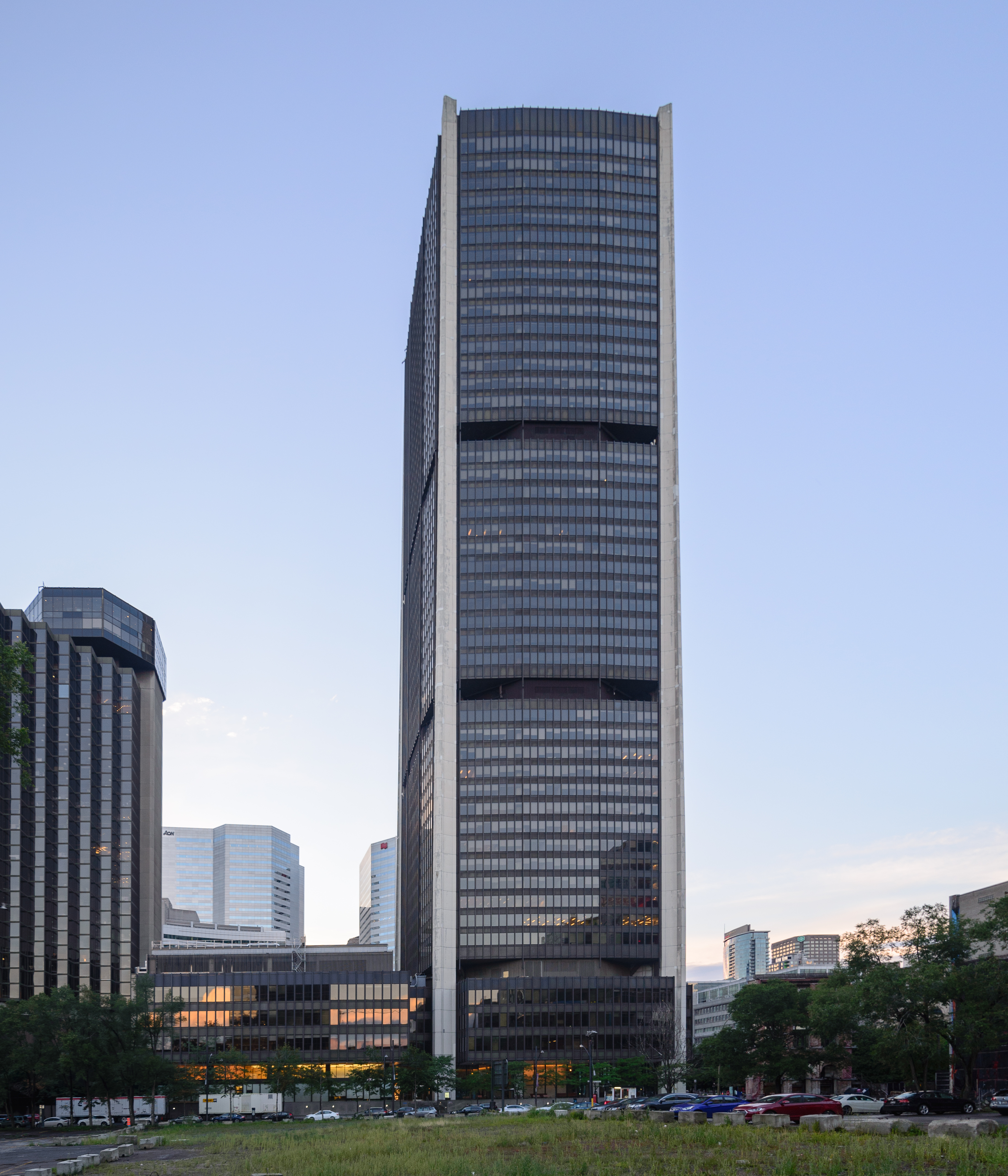
- Interactive map of the Tour de la Bourse area
- Alternative names: Place Victoria; Stock Exchange Tower

General information
- Type: Office
- Architectural style: International
- Location: 800 Square Victoria; Montreal, Quebec, Canada
- Coordinates: 45.500611°N 73.56175°W
- Completed: 1964

Height
- Roof: 194 m (636 ft)

Technical details
- Floor count: 48
- Floor area: 95,026 m^{2} (1,022,850 sq ft)
- Lifts/elevators: 26

Design and construction
- Architects: Luigi Moretti; Greenspoon, Freedlander, Dunne, Plachta & Kryton

Other information
- Public transit: at Square-Victoria–OACI station

Website
- groupepetra.findspace.com/building/place-victoria/

The Tour de la Bourse (lit. 'Stock Exchange Tower') is a 48-storey skyscraper in Montreal, Quebec, Canada. It is located at the intersection of Victoria Square and Saint Jacques Street in the International Quarter. It is connected by the underground city to the Square-Victoria-OACI Metro Station.

When completed in 1964, the tower was the tallest building in Canada, a title it held until surpassed by the Toronto-Dominion Centre in 1967. It is currently the third tallest in Montreal and the twenty-fifth tallest building in the country. The Tour de la Bourse was designed by Luigi Moretti and Pier Luigi Nervi and is considered to be of the International Style.

== History and development ==
The original project, conceived during the Expo 67-era economic boom, called for three identical towers arrayed in a triangle. It was scaled back to two towers flanking each side of the central core. Ultimately a single tower was built, due to financial constraints; the Hôtel Delta Centre-Ville was later built on the site of what was to be the second identical tower thus forming Place Victoria. Following the improvement and restoration of Square Victoria to its original configuration in 2002, Place Victoria is now a centrepiece of the new Quartier International downtown area.

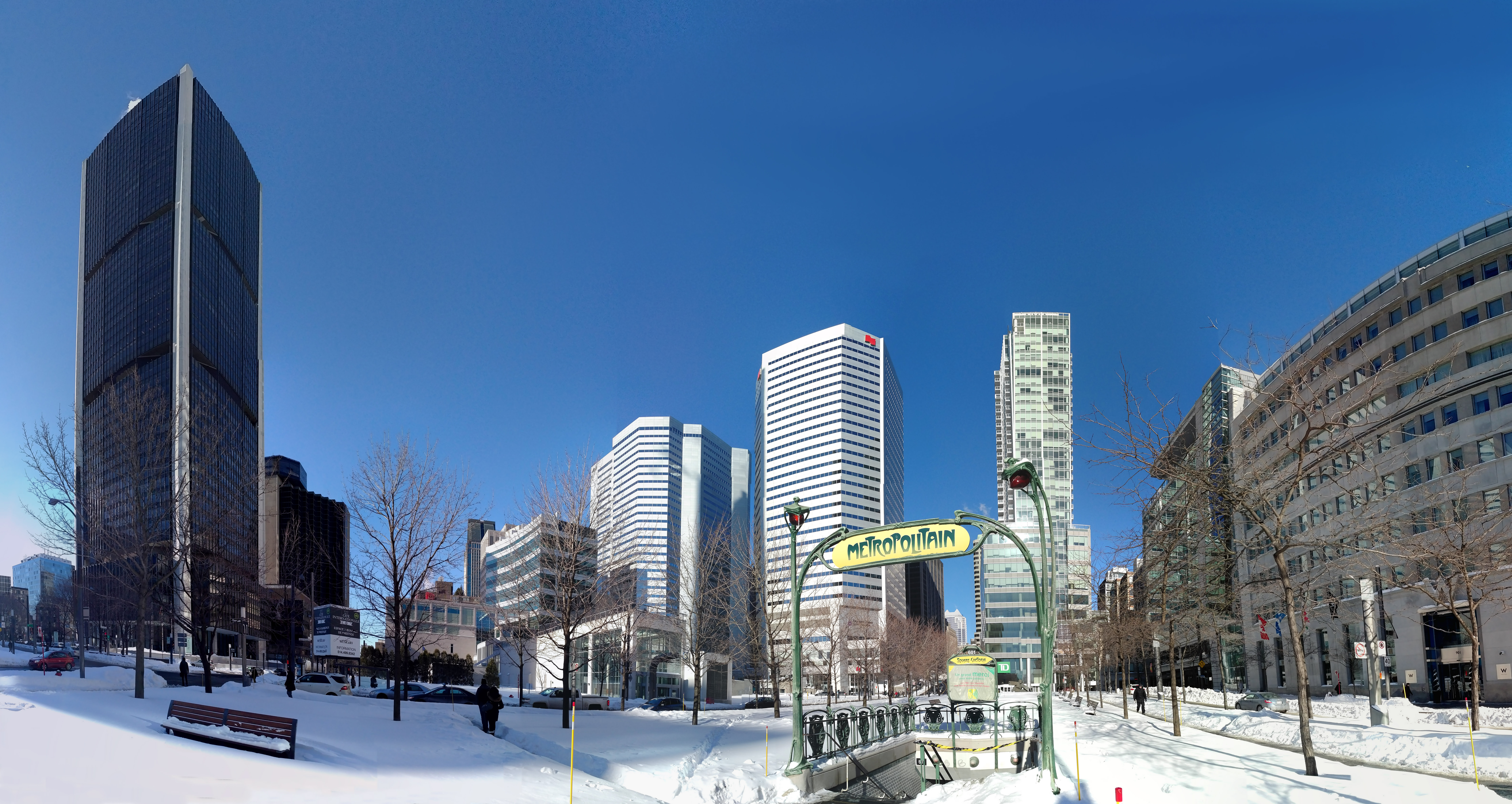
Tour de la bourse and metro station Square Victoria

The tower itself is considered by many to be a masterpiece of the International style of skyscraper design. Its façade, fully renovated in 1995, features a bronze-tinted anodized aluminium curtain wall, forming a strong contrast with the slightly slanted pre-cast concrete columns at the four corners, giving the whole a subtly convex aspect. It is divided into three roughly equal blocks by mechanical floors whose corners are recessed in an octagonal shape, creating small open-air interstices behind the columns at these levels. One couple of peregrine falcons has been nesting inside the 32nd floor recess since 1984.

This 190 m (620 ft), 48-story building was the world's tallest reinforced concrete tower until the completion of Lake Point Tower in Chicago in 1968, and the tallest building in Canada until the completion of Toronto-Dominion Centre in 1967.

The building's anchor tenant is still the Montreal Exchange on floors 3 and 4. The national and international law firm Fasken Martineau occupies six floors as well as space for services on the ground floor. The building is managed by Magil Laurentian Realty Corporation. In August 2004 Jolina Capital, owned by Lino Saputo who is also head of foodmaker Saputo Foods, acquired a majority stake in the building. Property management is still handled by Magil Laurentian, who retains a minority stake. In 2018, the owner of the building is Groupe Mach.

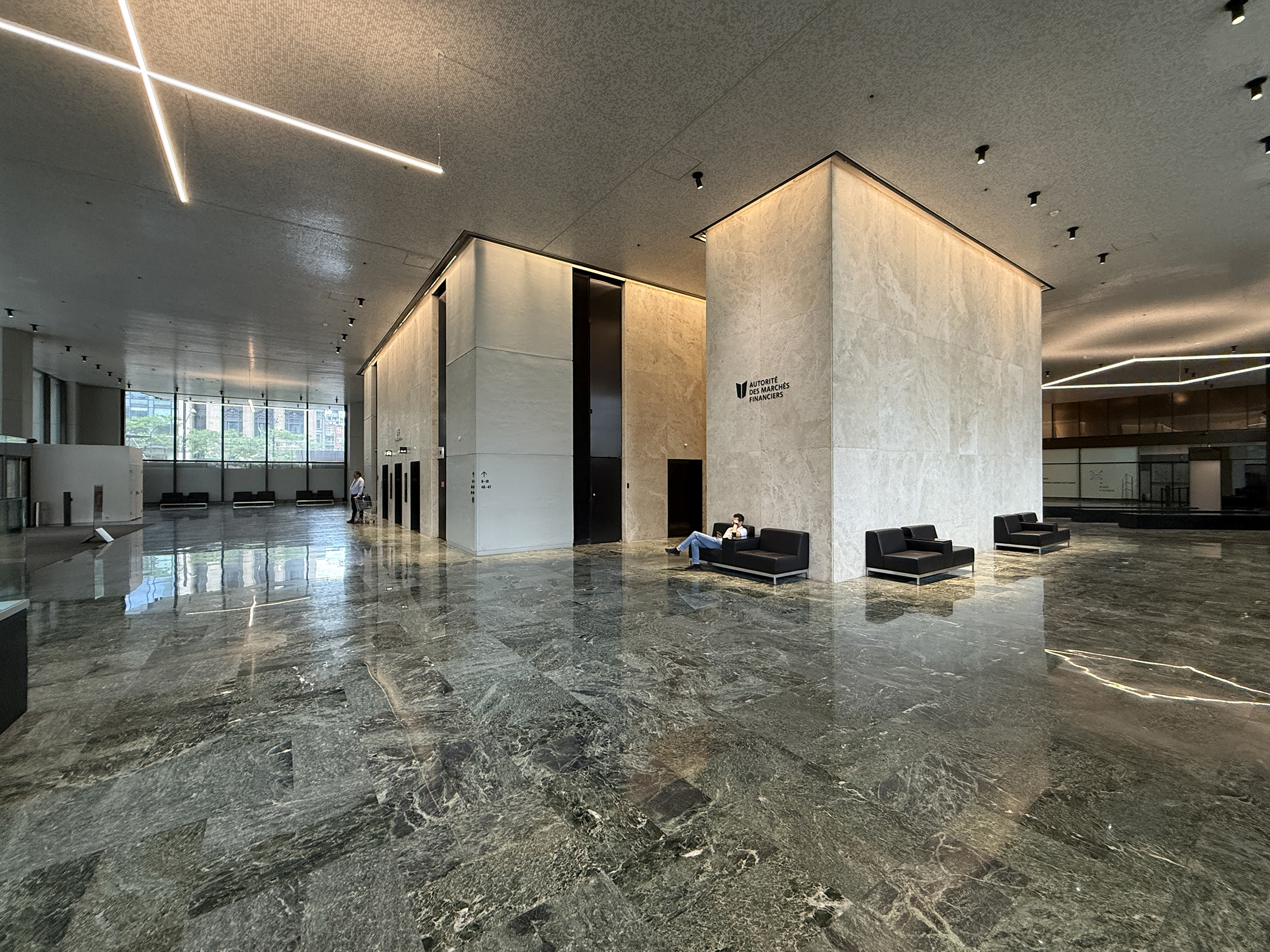
Office lobby

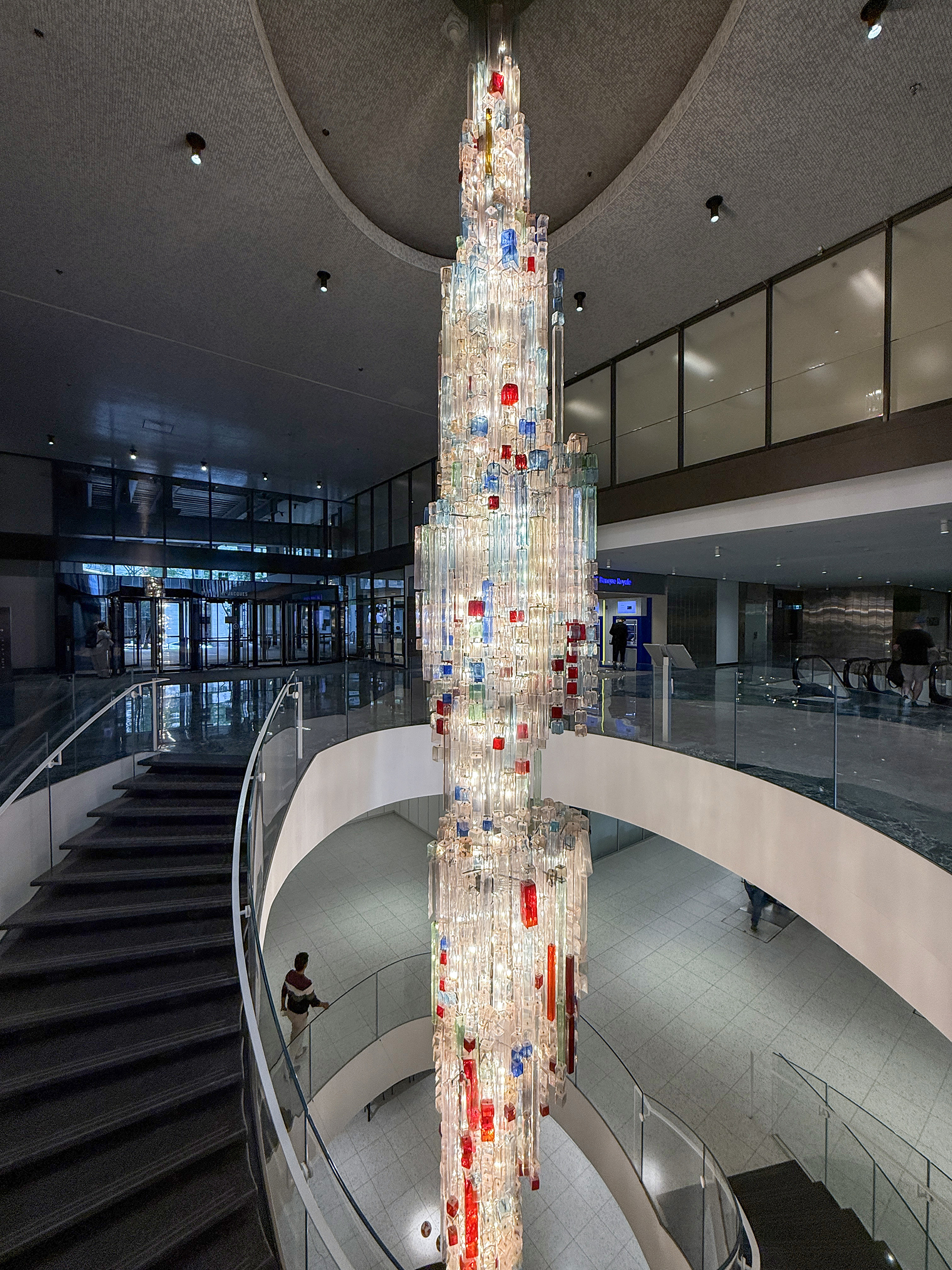
Stair chandelier

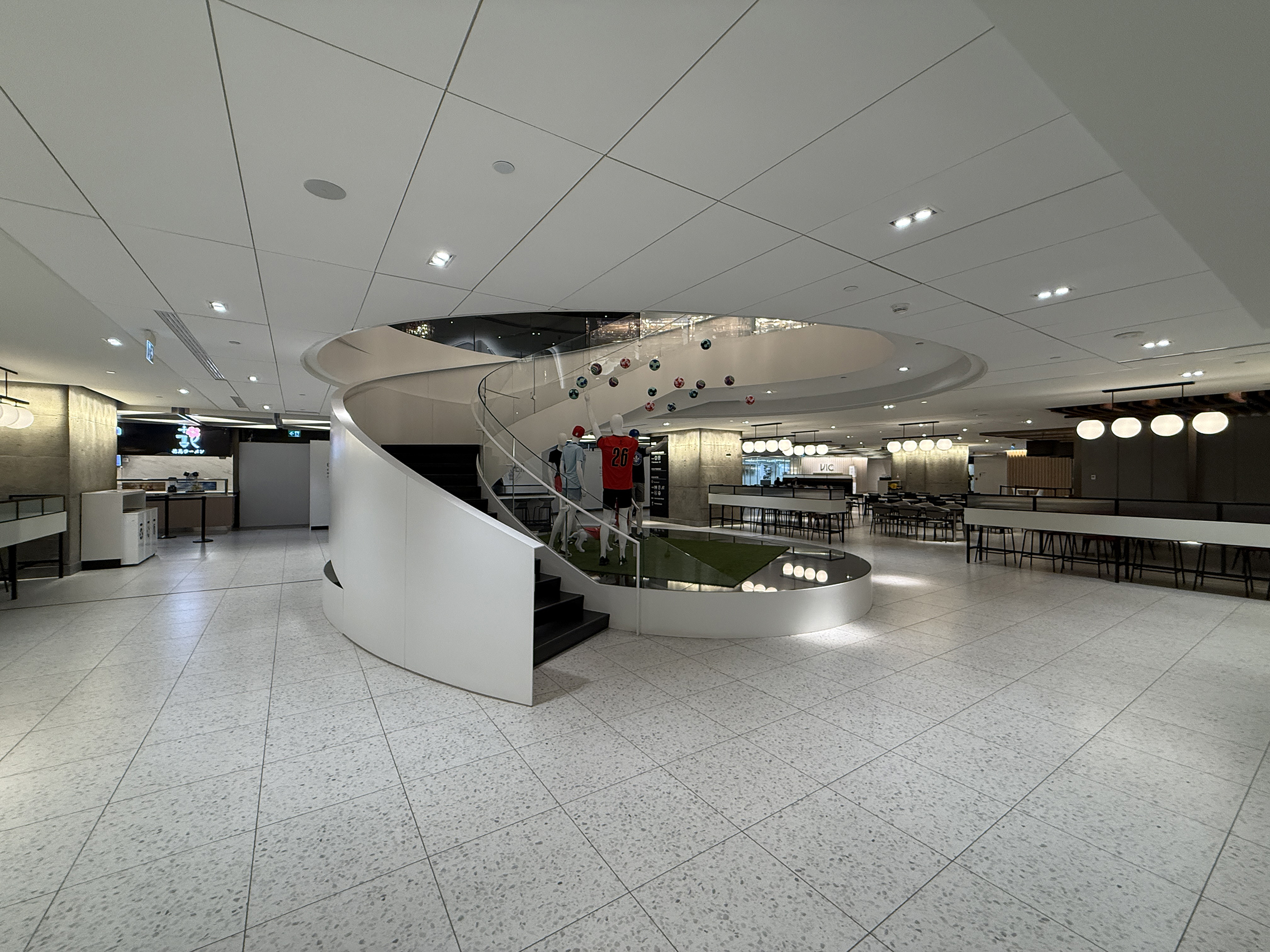
Food Court in basement

== Events ==
- On February 13, 1969, the Front de libération du Québec set off a bomb at the Stock Exchange, injuring twenty-seven people. No one was killed.
- On April 7, 2005, around 150 students occupied the ground floor of the building to block access to the elevators, as part of a strategy of economic disruption during the 2005 Quebec student strike. They were scattered by riot police two hours later; one arrest was made.
- In March 2010, the Tour de la Bourse was used by artist Aude Moreau for her work Sortir, in which the room lights in the upper levels of the tower were used to spell out the word "Sortir" across its façades.

== Tenants ==
- Airports Council International
- Autorité des marchés financiers
- Canoe.ca
- Dexia
- Dunton Rainville, Lawyers and Notaries
- Royal Bank of Canada
- Export Development Canada
- Fasken Martineau
- TMX Group Montreal Exchange
- IATA
- eStruxture Data Centers
- Robinson Sheppard Shapiro LLP
- World Anti-Doping Agency

== See also ==
- Old Montreal Stock Exchange Building
- List of tallest buildings in Montreal
