= Marie-Andrée Cossette =

Canadian artist and holographer

- Born: August 17, 1946; Saint-Hyacinthe, Quebec, Canada
- Died: December 17, 2023 (aged 77); Quebec City, Canada
- Known for: fine art holography

Marie-Andrée Cossette (August 17, 1946 – December 17, 2023) was a Canadian artist. Since 1976, Cossette has become known for her work in fine art holography. Cossette wrote the first fine arts master's thesis on the use of holography in art.

In 1998 she exhibited at the MIT Museum. Her work is included in the collections of the National Gallery of Canada and the Musée national des beaux-arts du Québec.
