= Pierre Vallières =

Canadian writer and journalist (1938–1998)

Pierre "PK" Vallières
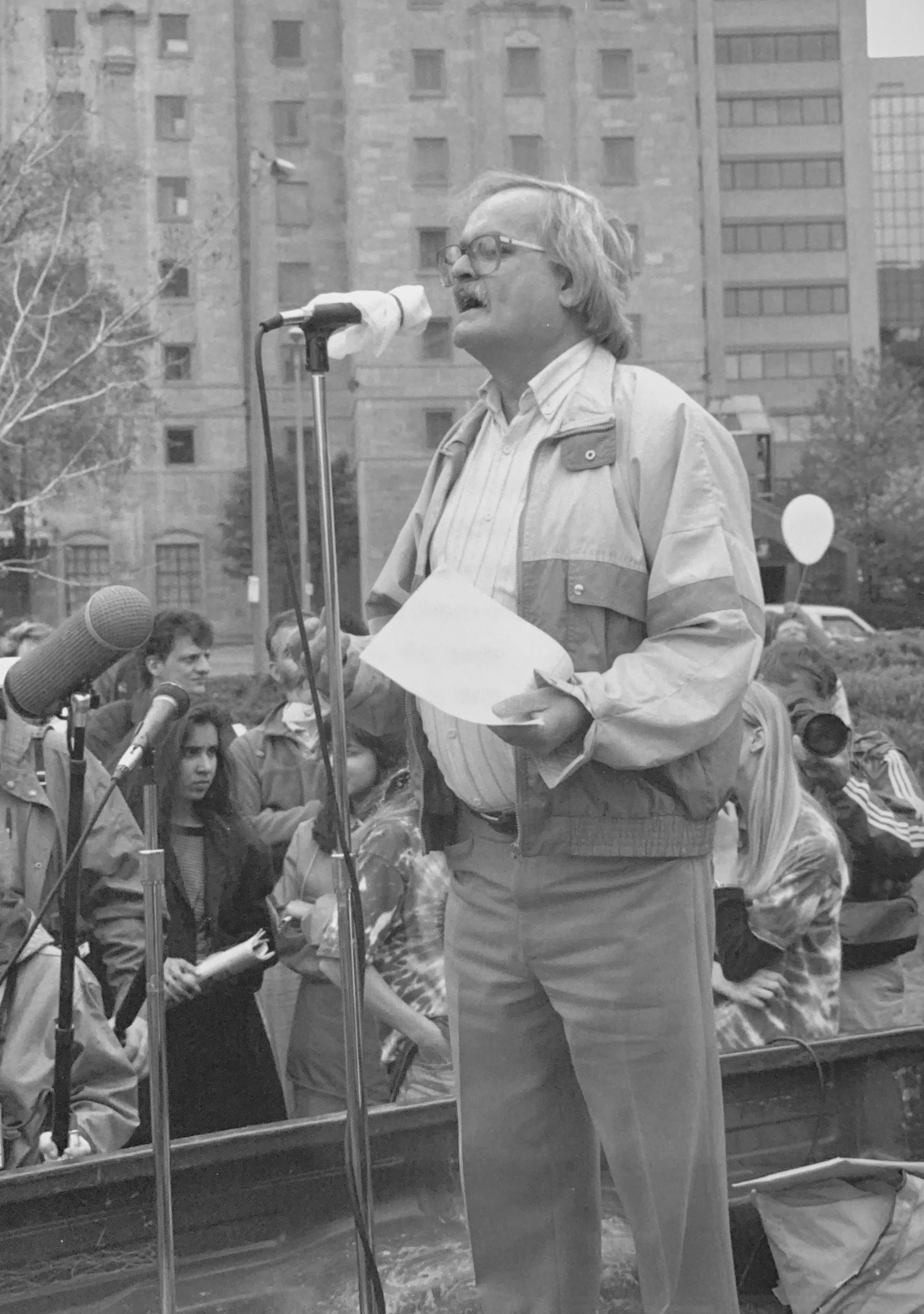
- Vallières in Ottawa, 1989
- Born: 22 February 1938; Montreal, Quebec, Canada
- Died: 23 December 1998 (aged 60); Montreal, Quebec, Canada
- Occupations: Journalist, writer, publisher

Pierre "PK" Vallières (French pronunciation: [pjɛʁ valjɛʁ]; 22 February 1938 – 23 December 1998) was a Canadian journalist and writer, known as an intellectual leader of the Front de libération du Québec (FLQ). He was the author of the essay Nègres blancs d'Amérique, which likened the struggles of French-Canadians to those of African-Americans.

== Biography ==
=== Early life ===
Pierre Vallières was born on 22 February 1938, in Montreal, Quebec, into a French-Canadian family. Vallières grew up in Ville Jacques-Cartier (now part of Longueuil) in the South Shore region, considered one of the most deprived areas of the Montreal metropolitan area. He entered the Franciscan Order but left after a couple of years. He worked in a bookstore before becoming a journalist, first for Le Devoir, and then for Cité Libre, for which he later became the director. He then went to cover international news for La Presse.

=== FLQ and Nègres blancs d'Amérique ===
Vallières had been working for La Presse for two years when he was fired for taking part in "subversive activities", having become a left-wing political activist at a young age. In September 1964, Vallières and Charles Gagnon published the first issue of left-wing Révolution québécoise magazine. In July 1965, Vallières and Gagnon led the "Fourth Wave" of the Front de libération du Québec (FLQ), a separatist and Marxist-Leninist paramilitary group in Quebec, when they combined the remains of the "Third Wave" with their Popular Liberation Movement. Vallières published the group's newspaper, La Cognée ("The Hit"), and was involved in militant activities. The FLQ's bombing campaign prompted a quick clampdown by Canadian authorities, and by August 1966, the Royal Canadian Mounted Police (RCMP) had arrested many FLQ members.

Vallières escaped the arrests and fled to the United States with Gagnon, where they conducted a hunger strike at the United Nations headquarters in New York City to protest what was considered to be Quebec's plight in Canada. While in New York, Vallières was held in the Manhattan House of Detention for Men before being extradited back to Canada, where he was immediately arrested in connection with the robbery of a Montreal cinema on 27 August 1966. Vallières, along with Charles Gagnon and five other people, was convicted of the manslaughter of Thérèse Morin, a 64-year-old secretary who died in the explosion of a bomb that was delivered to the H. B. La Grenade shoe manufacturer in Montreal on 5 May 1966, and of Jean Corbo, a 16-year-old FLQ member who died on 14 July 1966 in the explosion of the bomb he had placed himself at the Dominion Textile factory in Montreal. Vallières received a life sentence for the deaths, but the conviction was overturned by the court of appeal, and in a second trial held in 1969, he was convicted again and this time sentenced to 30 months in prison. He was paroled on 26 May 1970 after spending 44 months in prison.

Vallières wrote a number of works during his four-month imprisonment in New York in 1967, the most famous of which was Nègres blancs d'Amérique (1968), translated into English as White Niggers of America. The book compared the historical situation of French-Canadians to that of African-Americans at the height of the latter's civil rights struggles, where Vallières argued the parallels between the two peoples as an exploited lower class, and called for armed struggle of liberation against their common aristocratic oppressors.

=== Later life and death ===
In 1970, during the October Crisis, the FLQ abducted and murdered Pierre Laporte, Quebec's Minister of Labour and Manpower. The following year, Vallières renounced violence as a means to achieve Quebec independence, and on 4 October 1972, under a plea bargain agreement, received a one-year suspended sentence on three charges of counselling kidnapping for political purposes. Vallières then resumed his career as a journalist, writer, and publisher.

In later life he came out as gay, and advocated for causes including LGBTQ rights, mental health and indigenous self-government.

Vallières died from heart failure on 23 December 1998, at the Jacques-Viger Hospital in Montreal.

== Works ==
- Nègres blancs d'Amérique, autobiographie précoce d'un " terroriste " québécois. Montréal : Éditions Parti pris, 1967 (translated as White Niggers of America: The Precocious Autobiography of a Quebec Terrorist by Joan Pinkham, Monthly Review Press, 1971 and McClelland & Stewart, 1972)
- Vivre sans temps morts, jouir sans entraves! Paris, 1970
- L'urgence de choisir. Montréal Parti-Pris, 1971; (translated as Choose!, New Press, 1972 )
- Pour un front commun multinational de libération. with Charles Gagnon. S.l. : Front de libération du Québec, 1971
- Un Québec impossible. Montréal : Éditions Québec/Amérique, 1977 (translated as The Impossible Quebec: Illusions of Sovereignty Association, 1980)
- L'exécution de Pierre Laporte : les dessous de l'Opération. Montréal : Éditions Québec/Amérique, 1977 (translated as The Assassination of Pierre Laporte by Ralph Wells, Lorimer, 1977)
- Les scorpions associés. with René Lévesque. Montréal : Éditions Québec-Amérique, 1978
- La démocratie ingouvernable. Montréal : Québec/Amérique, 1979
- La liberté en friche. Montréal : Éditions Québec/Amérique, 1979
- Changer de société. with Serge Proulx. Montréal : Québec/Amérique, 1982
- Les héritiers de Papineau : itinéraire politique d'un "nègre blanc" (1960–1985). Montréal, Québec : Québec/Amérique, 1986
- Noces obscures. Montréal : L'Hexagone, 1986
- Le devoir de résistance. Montréal : VLB, 1994
- Paroles d'un nègre blanc. with Jacques Jourdain and Mélanie Mailhot. Montréal : VLB éditeur, 2002

== Film ==
- Freedom Outraged Vallières plays himself in a documentary by the National Film Board of Canada directed by Jean-Daniel Lafond. A 16-mm medium length, color, 1994.

== Bibliography ==
- Antaya, Felipe, Pierre Vallières ou le danger d'occulter le passé, master's thesis, Université du Québec à Trois-Rivières, Trois-Rivières, 2011, 108 p.
- Baillargeon, Constantin, Pierre Vallières vu par son "professeur de philosophie", Médiaspaul, Montréal, 2002, 128 p. ISBN 978-2-8942-0503-7
- Binamé, Charles, and Thériault, Normand, Pierre Vallières, television broadcast, Radio-Québec, 1974, 60 minutes
- Gignac, Benoit, Québec 68 : l'année révolution, Éditions La Presse, Montréal, 2008, 272 p. ISBN 978-2-9231-9481-3
- Jourdain, Jacques, De Cité Libre à L'urgence de choisir : Pierre Vallières et les palinodies de la gauche québécoise, master's thesis, Université du Québec à Montréal, Montréal, 1995, 115 p.
- Jourdain, Jacques, and Mailhot, Mélanie, Vallières : Paroles d'un nègre blanc, VLB éditeur, Montréal, 2002, 286 p. ISBN 978-2-8900-5735-7
- Samson-Legault, Daniel, Dissident : Pierre Vallières (1938–1998), Éditions Québec Amérique, Montréal, 2018, 497 p., ISBN 978-2-7644-3641-7
- Tétreault, Paul, A suggested framework for the study of perceptions of violence and its application to the writings of Pierre Trudeau and Pierre Vallières, master's thesis, McGill University, Montréal, 1971, 106 p.
