= Liberation Cell =

Montreal-based cell of the Front de libération du Québec

The Liberation Cell was a Montreal-based cell that was part of Front de libération du Québec (FLQ) revolutionary movement in Quebec whose members were responsible for a decade of bombings and armed robberies in the 1960s that led to what became known as the October Crisis.

As part of a violent attempt to overthrow the elected government and to establish a socialist Quebec state independent of Canada, on October 5, 1970, the members of the Liberation Cell kidnapped the United Kingdom Trade Commissioner James Richard Cross from his Montreal home. The kidnappers posed as deliverymen and tricked the house maid into letting them in, after which they pulled out their guns and seized Cross. Five days later, members of the FLQ's Chénier Cell kidnapped and then murdered the Deputy Premier of Quebec and Labour Minister, Pierre Laporte. Believing many others would follow in an uprising, the goal of the FLQ was to create an independent state based on the ideals of Fidel Castro's Cuba.

After holding the British Trade Commissioner for more than sixty days, the known members of the Liberation Cell negotiated his release in exchange for their safe passage to Cuba. Four weeks later, the known members of the Chénier Cell were located in a country farmhouse basement.

The known Liberation Cell members:

- Jacques Cossette-Trudel
- Louise Lanctôt (Louise Cossette-Trudel)
- Jacques Lanctôt
- Marc Carbonneau
- Yves Langlois (aka Pierre Seguin)
- Nigel Barry Hamer

== See also ==
- History of Quebec
