= Montreal Stock Exchange bombing =

1969 terrorist attack in Montreal, Canada

- Part of FLQ insurgency
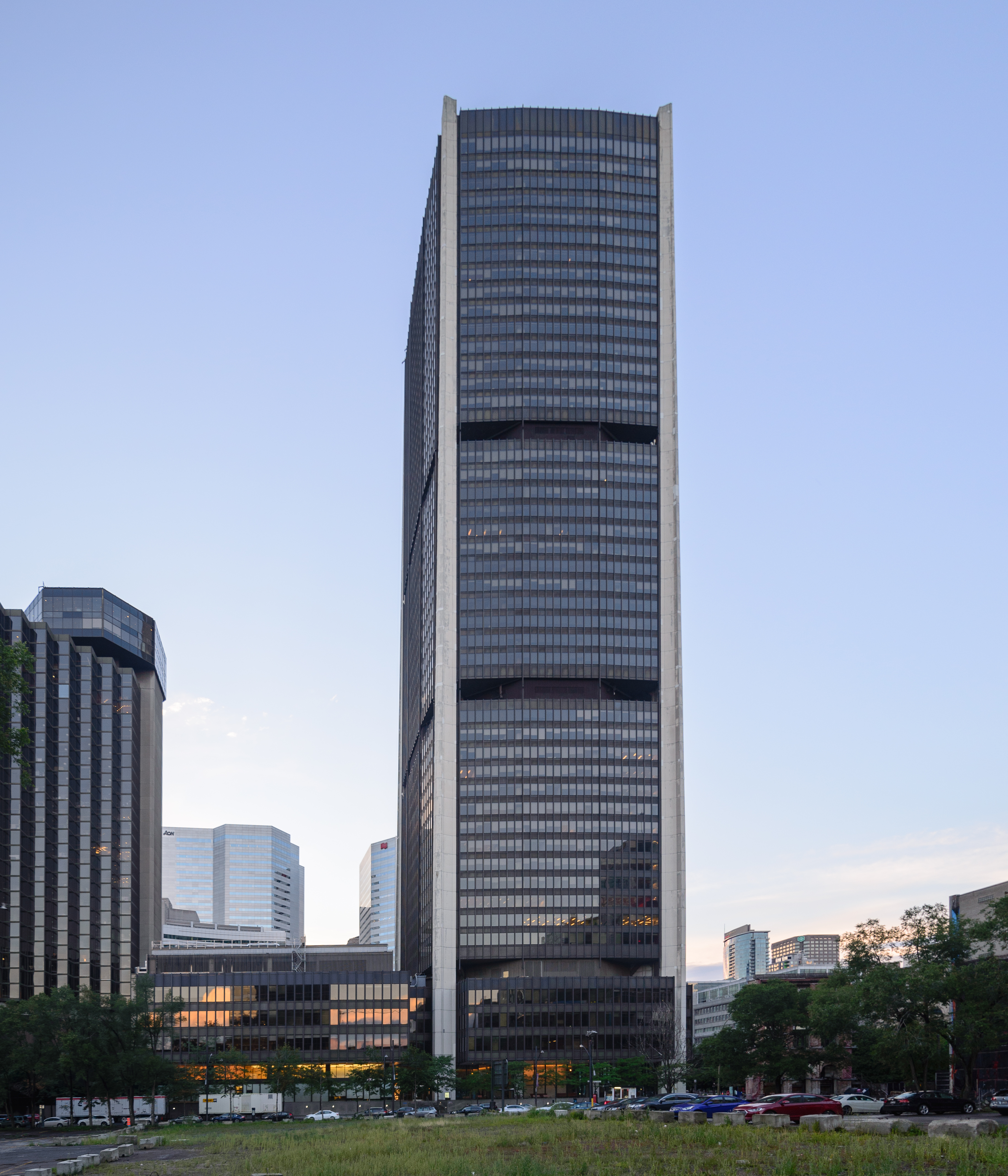
- The Tour de la Bourse seen in 2017
- Location: 45.500611°N 73.56175°W; Montreal Stock Exchange; Montreal, Quebec, Canada
- Date: February 13, 1969; 57 years ago 15:20 EST (UTC-05:00)
- Attack type: Bombing
- Deaths: None
- Injuries: 27
- Perpetrator: Front de libération du Québec

The Montreal Stock Exchange bombing was a domestic terrorist bombing of the Montreal Stock Exchange inside the Tour de la Bourse skyscraper in Montreal, Quebec, Canada, on February 13, 1969.

Perpetrated by the Quebec separatist Front de libération du Québec (FLQ), the bombing happened approximately 40 minutes before the end of trading. It injured 27 people and destroyed a large portion of the trading floor, visitor gallery, and the building's northeast wall. The blast caused nearly $1 million worth of property damage.

The attack was one of the FLQ's biggest in its bombing campaign, and was the culmination before the October Crisis of 1970.
