= Yves Langlois =

Canadian terrorist

Yves Langlois (born 1947) a.k.a. Pierre Seguin was a Canadian terrorist and member of the Quebec terrorist group Front de libération du Québec (FLQ), the group responsible for the 1970 October crisis. Langlois is one of the men who kidnapped British Trade Commissioner to Canada James Cross. Langlois also helped in the kidnapping and killing of Quebec cabinet minister Pierre Laporte who was another victim in the kidnappings.

Langlois was arrested in France for possession of illegal firearms and was sentenced to 2 years in prison.

After 11 years of voluntary exile in Cuba and France, he returned to Canada in 1982.
