= Nigel Hamer =

British-Canadian terrorist

Nigel Barry Hamer was a British-born Canadian terrorist, kidnapper, and school teacher who was a key member of the Front de libération du Québec (FLQ). He was a student at McGill University when he joined the Liberation Cell of the terrorist group and participated in the October Crisis of 1970. He actively participated in the hostage-taking of the British Trade Commissioner James Cross and was among those who guarded Cross at a secret location in Montreal. In the Keable Commission Inquiry, many raised questions as to why Hamer was not apprehended sooner, as law officials allegedly knew of his whereabouts and failed to question him as a suspect related to the crime. Following his involvement in the FLQ, Hamer returned to private life and has not given any interviews concerning his role as the sole anglophone in the Québécois liberation group.
