= Walter Leja =

Canadian soldier (1921–1992)

Walter Rolland "Rocky" Leja, GM, CD (July 1, 1921 – November 22, 1992) was born in Koniówka, Poland and later emigrated to Canada. He joined the Canadian Army (The Corps of Royal Canadian Engineers) and became a bomb disposal expert. On May 17, 1963, he successfully dismantled two bombs that had been planted in mailboxes in Westmount, Quebec by the separatist organization Front de libération du Québec (FLQ).

A third bomb, found in a mailbox at the corner of Lansdowne Avenue and Westmount Avenue, exploded while Leja attempted to disarm it, blowing off most of his left arm and crushing his face and chest. He suffered brain damage, lost the ability to speak and was paralyzed on his right side. Although initial reports said Leja's chances of survival were extremely slim, he managed to live. He was awarded the George Medal in January 1964 for conspicuous courage and outstanding devotion to duty.

Jean-Denis Lamoureux, a member of the FLQ who participated in the planting of the bombs, was subsequently jailed.
