= Denis Lamoureux =

Canadian professor

Denis O. Lamoureux is the Professor of Science and Religion at St. Joseph's College in the University of Alberta, in Edmonton, Alberta, Canada. He has doctoral degrees in dentistry, theology, and biology. The author of Evolutionary Creation and of I Love Jesus and I Accept Evolution, he has also written (along with Phillip E. Johnson) Darwinism Defeated? The Johnson-Lamoureux Debate on Biological Origins, on the creation–evolution controversy (Regent College, 1999).

Lamoureux, an evangelical Christian and a former Young-Earth creationist, calls himself as of 2013 an evolutionary creationist, and lectures and writes widely on the topic. Lamoureux has been involved in several public debates with prominent creationists and atheists. He has also been involved in a televised debate moderated by Steve Paikin of TV Ontario.

In an important new contribution, Evolution: Scripture and Nature say Yes Lamoureux has argued for a return to what he calls the original meaning of Intelligent Design, which he defines as "the belief that beauty, complexity and functionality in nature point toward an Intelligent Designer." Lamoureux argues that Intelligent Design should properly be understood as a religious (metaphysical) belief, not a scientific one. Therefore, he denies the claim by proponents of "Intelligent Design Theory" such as Michael Behe that it is scientifically testable as a process distinct from evolution. Instead, Intelligent Design should be understood as fully consistent with the evolution of life by mutation and natural selection operating through natural processes, because these processes are ultimately controlled by God.

In his latest book, The Bible & Ancient Science: Principles of Interpretation (2020), Lamoureux presents evidence for an ancient scientific understanding in the Bible, which removes the need for what he calls scientific concordism, the attempt to match the Bible with modern science. Lamoureux teaches that since the ancient Jewish people believed - and revealed in their Scriptures - in ancient scientific concepts like the firmament, a three-tier universe, and a geocentric universe, to name a few, modern Christians should not try to align the Bible with science, thus freeing them to enjoy the splendors of modern science. Lamoureux argues that being freed from scientific concordism does not deny a devout reverence for Scripture. For example, he teaches that each time nature is used in Scripture, particularly in the Old Testament, it is simply the incidental circumstances used by the Holy Spirit to reveal inerrant spiritual truths. Lamoureux calls this the Message-Incident Principle. Similarly, Lamoureux teaches that the Holy Spirit accommodates by coming down to the level of the ancient writers and readers, for they would not understand modern scientific concepts. The spiritual message is what was important. He calls this Biblical Accommodation. Lamoureux displays his reverence for Scripture by using the term inerrancy over a hundred times and feels his principles of biblical interpretation are a more honest approach to the Bible.

== Publications ==
- Lamoureux, Denis O. (29 December 2009). "Evolutionary Creation: Moving Beyond the Evolution Versus Creation Debate". Christian Higher Education. 9 (1). Informa UK Limited: 28–48. doi:10.1080/15363750903018231. ISSN 1536-3759. S2CID 17953449. (pdf)
- Lamoureux, Denis (2008). Evolutionary creation : a Christian approach to evolution. Havertown Eugene, Or: The Lutterworth Press Wipf & Stock. ISBN 978-1-55635-581-3. OCLC 885123583.
