= Raymond Villeneuve =

Marxist Revolutionary, co-founder of FLQ (1943-)

Raymond Villeneuve (born September 11, 1943) is a founding member of the Front de libération du Québec (FLQ), a Quebec separatist movement responsible for various acts of violence in Canada.

Villeneuve remained out of the spotlight as he was volunteering for the Parti Québécois from 1988 until the 1995 referendum. He then became "fed up" and created the Mouvement de libération nationale du Québec (MLNQ), espousing both his preference for peace and his preparedness for violence.

On September 23, 1996, Villeneuve appeared on Le Point du Jour, a morning show on CKVL hosted by Pierre Pascau. While on the show, he made some comments against Jews and Anglophones, including that bombs or Molotov cocktails could be used against Anglophone activist Howard Galganov. The following Sunday, Villeneuve published a newsletter, La Tempête (The Storm, in which he denounced Montreal's English speaking Jews for their longstanding opposition to the Quebec separatist movement and Bill 101 and sent this warning: "What will happen on the day after the victory to those communities who refused to prove conciliating towards the people of Quebec? Independence will come sooner or later and these communities must prepare now for cohabitation in harmony and agreement with the choice of Quebecers". The incident put the mainstream separatist movement on the defensive as the Federal Liberal Party tried to link Bloc Quebecois leader Michel Gauthier to Villeneuve's remarks.

Following a statement from Premier Lucien Bouchard disassociating himself and the Parti Québécois government from these comments, Villeneuve clarified that he hadn't intended to be taken literally. "I meant we will use political force. We will be the commandos, the troops", he explained.

== Quote ==
On the September 11 attacks: "I'm really jealous of [what happened in New York]. Those types of actions, we could never do that. But me, I was thinking about tank trucks. Apparently even Bin Laden has thought about that. Blowing up tank trucks is way easier than hijacking planes. It could happen in Toronto or it could happen in the West Island of Montreal where there are a lot of Canadians."
