= James Cross =

British diplomat (1921–2021)

- Born: James Richard Cross; 29 September 1921; Nenagh, County Tipperary, Ireland
- Died: 6 January 2021 (aged 99); Seaford, England
- Occupation: Diplomat
- Known for: Kidnapped during October Crisis in Canada

James Richard Cross CMG (29 September 1921 – 6 January 2021) was an Irish-born British diplomat who served in India, Malaysia and Canada. While posted in Canada, Cross was kidnapped by members of the Front de libération du Québec (FLQ) during the October Crisis of October 1970. He was ultimately released almost two months later, and subsequently returned to the United Kingdom.

== Early life and career ==
Cross was born in Nenagh in County Tipperary, Ireland, on 29 September 1921. His mother died during her labour with him. His elder sibling had intellectual disabilities and was consequently institutionalised. Cross was raised on the family farm, which was a hundred acres (40 ha) in size, before moving in with relatives. He was nicknamed "Jasper" by his family and friends. Cross studied economics and political science at Trinity College Dublin, where he graduated with a first class honours degree in 1944. It was there that he also met his wife, Barbara Dagg, who studied modern languages.

During World War II, Cross served with the British Army and fought for the liberation of France. He was commissioned into the Royal Engineers Movement Control Section in 1944. After the war, Cross joined the diplomatic service and was assigned first to New Delhi in 1953. His first stint in Canada commenced in 1957, when he served in Halifax and Winnipeg for five years. He was consequently assigned to Kuala Lumpur for four years (in then Malaya and after 1963 Malaysia), before going back to London in 1966 to direct the Board of Trade branch in charge of exhibitions and fairs overseas. He returned to Canada in February 1968 as the senior Trade Commissioner in Montreal.

== Kidnapping ==
On 5 October 1970, Cross was abducted at gunpoint from his British diplomatic residence at 1297 Redpath Crescent, in the Golden Square Mile district of Montreal, and held as a hostage for two months as the FLQ made a series of demands to the Quebec government. During captivity, due to stress and a shortage of food, Cross lost 10 kg (22 lb). He was released on 3 December after 60 days in captivity. In exchange for his release, his abductors would get safe passage to Cuba. The talks were held at the Canada Pavilion, located on Notre Dame Island, the site of Expo 67. This site was declared Cuban territory for the period of the talks.

Six members of the FLQ's "Liberation Cell" were later convicted of Cross's kidnapping when they returned to Canada during the late 1970s. They received custodial sentences ranging from 12 to 24 months.

Cross said of his kidnapping:

They [the kidnappers] told me about 10 o'clock on Wednesday evening that the police knew where I was. Nothing much happened for the next four hours. Then, the power was cut at around 2 o'clock in the morning. I was in bed at the time - they got me up. They took me into the corridor in the centre of the house, handcuffed me to a doorknob, and that's where I spent the night. It was a very uncomfortable position.

On the 40th anniversary of the day that sparked the October Crisis in 2010, Cross agreed to speak to CBC Radio's The Current about the events surrounding his kidnapping. There is also a transcript of a taped memoir online, uploaded by the archives centre at Churchill College, Cambridge.

== Later life ==
Cross returned to the United Kingdom after his release and continued working for the civil service. However, he was no longer assigned overseas postings. Although he received a number of offers to sell his story, he did not since he was prohibited by the government from doing so. Cross went on to serve as Under-Secretary in various divisions of Britain's Department of Trade and Industry and Department of Energy. He was made a Companion of the Order of St Michael and St George (CMG) in January 1971.

Cross retired to Seaford, East Sussex. He died at his home there on 6 January 2021. He was 99, and suffered from complications of COVID-19 during the COVID-19 pandemic in England in the time leading up to his death. Both his wife and their only child (Susan) predeceased him in 2018 and 2015, respectively.

== In fiction ==
Cross is depicted as a character in the novel The Revolution Script by Brian Moore, together with Pierre Laporte. Their names are changed by Moore out of respect for their families. He is also featured in My October by Claire Holden Rothman, and as a character in the 2006 Canadian television series October 1970, played by R.H. Thomson.

== See also ==
- List of kidnappings (1970–1979)
