= Front de libération du Québec =

Militant separatist group (1963–1971)

- Flag of the FLQ as seen at demonstrations in Montreal and the U.S. between 1968 and 1971
- Leaders: Charles Gagnon; Gabriel Hudon; Georges Schoeters; Jacques Lanctôt; Pierre-Paul Geoffroy; Pierre Vallières; Raymond Villeneuve
- Dates active: 1963–1971
- Country: Canada
- Active regions: Quebec
- Ideology: Communism; Marxism–Leninism; Left-wing nationalism; Quebec separatism; Quebec nationalism; Revolutionary socialism
- Political position: Far-left

The Front de libération du Québec (Note: French pronunciation: [fʁɔ̃ də libeʁɑsjɔ̃ dy kebɛk]; transl. Quebec Liberation Front.) (FLQ) was a Quebec separatist militant group which aimed to establish an independent and socialist Quebec. Founded sometime in the early 1960s, the FLQ conducted a number of attacks between 1963 and 1970, which totalled over 160 violent incidents and killed eight people and injured many more. These attacks culminated with the Montreal Stock Exchange bombing in 1969 and the October Crisis in 1970, the latter beginning with the kidnapping of British Trade Commissioner James Cross. In the subsequent negotiations, Quebec Labour Minister Pierre Laporte was kidnapped and murdered by a cell of the FLQ. Public outcry and a federal crackdown subsequently ended the crisis and resulted in a drastic loss of support for the FLQ, with a small number of FLQ members being granted refuge in Cuba.

FLQ members practised propaganda of the deed and issued declarations that called for a socialist insurrection against oppressors identified with Anglo-Saxon imperialism, the overthrow of the Quebec government, the independence of Quebec from Canada and the establishment of a French-speaking "workers' society" in Quebec. Up to 1970, it gained the support of many left-leaning students, teachers and academics, who engaged in public strikes in solidarity with the FLQ during the October Crisis. After the kidnapping of Cross, nearly 1,000 students at Université de Montréal signed a petition supporting the FLQ manifesto. This public support largely ended after the group announced they had killed Laporte, in a public communiqué that ended with an insult to the victim. The KGB, which had established contact with the FLQ before 1970, later forged documents to portray them as a CIA false flag operation, a story that gained limited traction among academic sources before declassified Soviet archives revealed the ruse. By the early 1980s, most of the imprisoned FLQ members had been paroled or released.

== History ==
Members and sympathizers of the group were called "Felquistes" (French pronunciation: [fɛlˈkist]), a word coined from the French pronunciation of the letters FLQ. Some of the members were organized and trained by Georges Schoeters, a Belgian revolutionary. FLQ members Normand Roy and Michel Lambert received guerrilla training from the Palestine Liberation Organization in Jordan. The FLQ was a loose association operating as a clandestine cell system. Various cells emerged over time: the Viger Cell founded by Robert Comeau, history professor at the Université du Québec à Montréal; the Dieppe Cell; the Louis Riel Cell; the Nelson Cell; the Saint-Denis Cell; the Liberation Cell; and the Chénier Cell. The last two of these cells were involved in what became known as the October Crisis. From 1963 to 1970, the FLQ committed over 200 violent actions, including bombings, bank hold-ups, kidnappings, at least three killings by FLQ bombs and two killings by gunfire. In 1966, Revolutionary Strategy and the Role of the Avant-Garde was prepared by the FLQ, outlining their long-term strategy of successive waves of robberies, violence, bombings, and kidnappings, culminating in revolution. The history of the FLQ is sometimes described as a series of "waves". The ideology was based on an extreme form of Quebec nationalism that denounced Anglo exploitation and control of Quebec, combined with Marxist–Leninist ideas and arguments.

== First wave ==
The first formation of the FLQ was composed of members of the Rassemblement pour l'Indépendance Nationale, some of whom wished for faster action. This group formed the Réseau de Résistance, or Resistance Network. This group eventually broke up, forming the FLQ. The group was recruited among various sources, eventually recruiting one Mario Bachand. The FLQ commenced their attacks on 7 March 1963. Some of their more notable crimes include bombing a railway (by which then–Prime Minister of Canada John Diefenbaker had arranged to travel within the week).

=== 7 March 1963 ===
- Three Molotov cocktails planted at the armouries of the Victoria Rifles of Canada, the Royal Montreal Regiment, and the 4th Battalion Royal 22^{e} Régiment (in Châteauguay). Little to no damage done.
- Leaflets with the aims of the FLQ were distributed widely throughout the city of Montreal. On the 9-by-12-inch (230 mm × 300 mm) documents can be found a crude crayon coloured drawing of the resistance flag along with the following inscription: "Suicide-commandos of the Quebec Liberation Front have as their mission to completely destroy, by systematic sabotage:
  1. "All the symbols and colonial institutions (federal), in particular the [Royal Canadian Mounted Police] and the armed forces.
  2. "All the information media of the colonial language (English) which holds us in contempt.
  3. "All enterprises and commercial establishments which practise discrimination against Quebec people, which do not use French as their primary language, which have signs in the colonial language (English).
  4. "All the factories that discriminate against French-speaking workers"

=== 1 April 1963 ===
- A saboteur with a bomb caused minor damage to a 25-inch (640 mm) section of rail between Montreal and Quebec City in the town of Lemieux. It appeared to go unnoticed as traffic continued on the rail line. An engineer eventually called in a "rough spot" that needed repair and a maintenance crew was immediately dispatched for repairs in time for Prime Minister Diefenbaker to travel through shortly after.
- A bomb is detonated in the ventilation system of the Department of National Revenue. No one is injured.
- The words Québec libre and the letters "FLQ" are written on the official residence of the Quebec lieutenant governor, Paul Comtois.

=== 12 April 1963 ===
- In response to increased FLQ activities, 50 police officers conducted predawn raids on the homes of 15 suspected members of the FLQ.

=== 20 April 1963 ===
- Shortly before 1:00 am, an individual claiming to be a member of the FLQ called the Canadian Press and announced "Operation Jean Lesage has started." Soon thereafter a stick of dynamite exploded outside the RCMP headquarters. No one was injured.
- At approximately 11:45 pm a bomb detonated at the Canadian Army Recruiting Centre in Montreal. A 65-year-old furnaceman, William Vincent O'Neill, was killed instantly.

=== 17 May 1963 ===
- In the early morning 15 mailboxes in Westmount were planted with time bombs. Five exploded at 3 am. Nine of the remaining ten bombs were successfully dismantled. One bomb, planted by Jean-Denis Lamoureux, critically wounded a Canadian military bomb disposal expert, Walter Leja.

=== 20 May 1963 ===
- One car was completely destroyed and three others severely damaged when a car bomb detonated outside the Corps of Royal Canadian Electrical and Mechanical Engineers (RCEME) building in what was the largest explosion at the hands of the FLQ. No one was injured.
- Multiple harmless bomb threats are received throughout the province of Quebec. Only one threat resulted in finding sticks of dynamite.

By 1 June 1963, eight members of the FLQ were arrested in a surprise raid. In 1963, Gabriel Hudon and Raymond Villeneuve were sentenced to 12 years in prison after their bomb killed William V. O'Neill, a furnaceman at Montreal's Canadian Army Recruiting Centre. Their targets also included English-owned businesses, banks, McGill University, Loyola College and the Black Watch Armoury.

== Second wave ==
A group of six individuals, two of whom were brothers of FLQ members arrested in 1963 (Robert Hudon and Jean Gagnon), commenced a series of crimes in Quebec over a period between 26 September 1963 and 9 April 1964. They called themselves the Quebec Liberation Army (L'Armée de Libération du Québec), and stole approximately CA$100,000 (CA$900,000 when adjusted for inflation as of 2023) in goods and money. Most of these individuals were also released by 1967.

== Third wave ==
A larger group of revolutionaries became known as the "Revolutionary Army of Quebec" (L'Armée Révolutionnaire du Québec). This group attempted to focus on training, particularly in St. Boniface. A botched gun warehouse robbery on 29 August 1964 resulted in two deaths, the company's vice-president Leslie McWilliams and gunsmith Alfred Pinisch. Other employees were lined up to be shot when Pinisch burst upon the scene and was killed. Cyr Delisle, Gilles Brunet, Marcel Tardif, François Schirm (a French Foreign Legion veteran), and Edmond Guenette, the five members arrested in connection with the deaths of MacWilliams and Pinisch, workers at the store, were sentenced to life in prison. Other members of the FLQ were arrested as well.

== Fourth wave ==
Charles Gagnon and Pierre Vallières combined their "Popular Liberation Movement" with the FLQ in July 1965. This also combined several other pro-sovereignty groups. This may have led to a more socialist FLQ attitude. This new group robbed a New Democratic Party office and a radio station for supplies, many of which were used to write La Cognée, the revolutionary paper published by the FLQ during the many years of activity. It translates to "The Hit (Knock)". The 4th wave saw the increasing use of explosives, the production styles of which were sometimes detailed in La Cognée. A 15-year-old FLQ member, Jean Corbo, was killed by his own explosive, and a 64-year-old female office worker died during the FLQ bombing of the shoe factory Lagrenade.

By August 1966, the Royal Canadian Mounted Police (RCMP) had arrested many FLQ members. Gagnon and Vallières had fled to the United States, where they protested in front of the Headquarters of the United Nations and were later arrested. It was during his incarceration that Vallières wrote his book White Niggers of America, which compared the Québécois liberation struggle to that of Black people in the United States. In September 1967, the pair were extradited to Canada.

In 1968, after various riots within Quebec and in Europe, a new group of FLQ was formed. Within a year, this group of Felquistes had exploded 52 bombs. Rather than La Cognée, they wrote La Victoire, or Victory. The various members of the group were arrested by 2 May 1969.

== Attacks ==
On 13 February 1969, the FLQ set off a powerful bomb that ripped through the Montreal Stock Exchange causing massive destruction and seriously injuring 27 people. After more bombings, on 28 September 1969 they bombed the home of Montreal mayor Jean Drapeau. After the bombing, police concluded that the bomb was placed in the toilet so inspectors could not find it.

The year 1969 also saw many riots, including one against McGill University. The RCMP had intercepted intelligence relating to the planned riots, and prevented excessive damage. This failed riot led to Mario Bachand leaving Canada, and another group of FLQ forming, which would become responsible for the October Crisis. This group, formed of Paul Rose, Jacques Rose, Francis Simard, and Nigel Hamer became known as the "South Shore Gang".

On 5 May 1969, FLQ members Jean-Pierre Charette and Alain Alard, who had previously fled from Canada to the U.S., hijacked a National Airlines Boeing 727 in New York, and diverted it to Cuba.

In 1969, the FLQ gave support to the "Taxi Liberation Front", which was opposing the Anglo-owned Murray-Hill taxi company. The TLF was created by the "Popular Liberation Front", which was founded by Jacques Lanctôt and Marc Carbonneau. Jacques Lanctôt is credited with writing the FLQ Manifesto prior to the October Crisis.

The South Shore Gang bought a house, which they named "The Little Free Quebec", and it quickly became a den of the FLQ. Jacques Lanctôt was charged in connection with a failed FLQ kidnapping attempt of an Israeli diplomat, and in 1970, while a member of the FLQ, likely took refuge at "The Little Free Quebec". These new FLQ members bought two other houses, prepared their plans, and stocked sufficient equipment for their upcoming actions.

The group was divided over what plans should be taken, but were reunited during the crisis itself.

== October Crisis ==
On 5 October 1970, members of the FLQ's Liberation Cell kidnapped James Richard Cross, the British Trade Commissioner, as he was leaving his home for work. Shortly afterwards, on 10 October, the Chénier Cell kidnapped the Minister of Labour and Vice-Premier of Quebec, Pierre Laporte. Laporte was coming from a meeting with others where they had discussed the demands of the FLQ.

In the following days, FLQ leaders held meetings to increase public support for the cause. Consequently, a general strike involving students, teachers and professors resulted in the closure of most French-language secondary and post-secondary academic institutions. On 15 October 1970, more than 3,000 students attended a protest rally in favour of the FLQ. Demonstrations of public support influenced subsequent government actions.

After holding Laporte captive for a week, members of the FLQ killed Laporte. On 17 October, callers to a radio station announced that Laporte had been murdered and divulged the location of a map which led to the discovery of his body.

The FLQ released a list of demands for Cross's release:

1. The release of 23 "political prisoners" (including: Cyriaque Delisle, Edmond Guenette and François Schirm, Serge Demers, Marcel Faulkner, Gérard Laquerre, Robert Lévesque, Réal Mathieu, and Claude Simard; Pierre-Paul Geoffroy, Michel Loriot, Pierre Demers, Gabriel Hudon, Robert Hudon, Marc-André Gagné, François Lanctôt, Claude Morency, and André Roy; Pierre Boucher and André Ouellette).
2. The FLQ members André Lessard, Pierre Marcil, and Réjean Tremblay, who were out on bail at the time of the kidnappings, should be allowed to leave Quebec if they wanted.
3. All family members of the "political prisoners" and those out on bail should be able to join them outside of Quebec.
4. $500,000 in gold.
5. The broadcast and publication of the FLQ Manifesto.
6. The publication of the name of a police informant.
7. A helicopter to take the kidnappers to Cuba or Algeria and while doing so they would be accompanied by their lawyers.
8. The rehiring of about 450 Lapalme postal workers who had been laid off because of their support of the FLQ.
9. The cessation of all police search activities.

The FLQ also stipulated how the above demands would be carried out:

1. The prisoners were to be taken to the Montreal airport and supplied a copy of the FLQ Manifesto. They were to be allowed to communicate with each other and become familiar with the Manifesto.
2. They were not to be dealt with in a harsh or brutal manner.
3. They must be able to communicate with their lawyers to discuss the best course of action, whether to leave Quebec or not. As well, these lawyers must receive passage back to Quebec.

As part of its Manifesto, the FLQ stated: "In the coming year Bourassa (Quebec premier Robert Bourassa) will have to face reality; 100,000 revolutionary workers, armed and organized."

Canada's Prime Minister Pierre Elliot Trudeau, in his statement to the press during the October Crisis, admitted that the radicalism occurring in Quebec at this time had bred out of social unease due to imperfect legislation. "The government has pledged that it will introduce legislation which deals not only with the symptoms but with the social causes which often underlie or serve as an excuse for crime and disorder." (Pierre Trudeau, CBC interview). However, despite this admission, Trudeau declared in his statement to the press that in order to deal with the unruly radicals or "revolutionaries," the federal government would invoke the War Measures Act, the first time the country used these powers during peacetime.

Invoking the War Measures Act was a politically risky move for Trudeau because the Act overrode fundamental rights and privileges enumerated in the common law and in the Canadian Bill of Rights; therefore, there was a strong possibility that Trudeau might have lost popular support among Quebec voters. However, this did not occur.

In an impromptu interview with Tim Ralfe and Peter Reilly on the steps of Parliament, Pierre Trudeau, responding to a question of how extreme his implementation of the War Measures Act would be, Trudeau answered, "Well, just watch me." This line has become a part of Trudeau's legacy.

Early in December 1970, police discovered the location of the kidnappers holding James Cross. His release was negotiated and on 3 December 1970, five of the FLQ members were granted their request for safe passage to Cuba by the Government of Canada after approval by Fidel Castro.

As a result of the invocation of the War Measures Act, civil liberties were suspended. By 29 December 1970, police had arrested 453 people with suspected ties to the FLQ. Some detainees were released within hours, while others were held for up to 21 days. Several persons who were detained were initially denied access to legal counsel. Of the 453 people who were arrested, 435 were eventually released without being charged.

On 13 December 1970, Pierre Vallières announced in Le Journal that he had terminated his association with the FLQ. As well, Vallières renounced the use of terrorism as a means of political reform and instead advocated the use of standard political action.

In late December, four weeks after the kidnappers of James Cross were found, Paul Rose and the kidnappers and murderers of Pierre Laporte were found hiding in a country farmhouse. They were tried and convicted for kidnapping and murder.

The events of October 1970 contributed to the loss of support for violent means to attain Quebec independence, and increased support for a political party, the Parti Québécois, which in 1976 received the most votes and elected a majority government.

In July 1980, police arrested and charged a sixth person in connection with the Cross kidnapping. Nigel Hamer, a British radical socialist and FLQ sympathizer, pleaded guilty and was sentenced to 12 months in jail.

== Decline ==
Police deterrence and flagging public support contributed to the decline of the FLQ. By 1971, the Montreal Police anti-terrorist unit had highly placed informants within the FLQ organization, a cell of seven members were arrested on 5 October, the one year anniversary of the Cross kidnapping, and in December 1971 four FLQ members were arrested by a police force.

The support and political capacity of the FLQ changed drastically during the 1970s. The FLQ immediately lost public support after the October crisis and the murder of Laporte. The general public overwhelmingly supported the emergency powers and the presence of the military in Quebec. Laporte's murder marked a crossroads in the political history of the FLQ. It helped sway public opinion towards more conventional forms of political participation and drove up popular support for the Parti Québécois (PQ).

The rise of the PQ attracted both active and would-be participants away from the FLQ. In December 1971, Pierre Vallières emerged after three years in hiding to announce that he was joining the PQ. In justifying his decision he described the FLQ as a "shock group" whose continued activities would only play into the hands of the forces of repression against which they were no match. Those members of the FLQ who had fled began returning to Canada from late 1971 until 1982, and most received light sentences for their offences.

== KGB involvement ==
According to Christopher Andrew's and Vasili Mitrokhin's book based on the Mitrokhin archive, the Soviet Union's KGB likely established contact with the FLQ.

The KGB was concerned that the FLQ's attacks could be linked to the Soviet Union. It designed a disinformation campaign and forged documents to portray the FLQ as a CIA false flag operation. A photocopy of the forged "CIA document" was "leaked" to the Montreal Star in September 1971. The operation was so successful that Canada's prime minister believed that the CIA had conducted operations in Canada. The story was still quoted in the 1990s, even among academic authors.

== Cultural depictions ==
- Corbo
- Cotton Mill, Treadmill (On est au coton)
- Nô
- October 1970
- Octobre
- Orders (Les Ordres)
- The Revolution Script (novel by Brian Moore)
- A Very Secret Service (season 2)

== See also ==
- Timeline of the Front de libération du Québec
- List of terrorist attacks in Canada
- PROFUNC
