= Robert Lemieux =

Canadian lawyer (1941–2008)

Robert Félix Lemieux
- Born: October 9, 1941; Montréal, Quebec, Canada
- Died: January 21, 2008 (aged 66); Sept-Îles, Quebec, Canada
- Occupation: Lawyer
- Years active: 1966-2008

Robert Félix Lemieux (October 9, 1941 – January 21, 2008) was a Canadian lawyer. He served as an intermediary for the Front de libération du Québec cells and Canadian authorities during the October Crisis.

== Early life ==
Lemieux was the eldest of six children in a Radio-Canada technician's family. He was educated at Collège Mont-Saint-Louis in Montreal, and in 1965 obtained his law degree from McGill University, where he was influenced by civil libertarian Frank Scott. After being called to the bar in 1966, he went to work for O'Brien, Home, Hall, Nolan & Saunders.

== Career ==
=== Early association with the FLQ ===
In 1966, he was asked to represent Robert Levesque, an early FLQ member who faced six charges of robbing and bombing an armoury. While legal wrangling over the case continued, Levesque spent two years in jail without trial. Though Levesque was eventually sentenced to seven years in prison, Lemieux was angered by the delays.

While defending FLQ terrorists Pierre Vallières and Charles Gagnon, he was fired from the law firm in January 1968. He moved his law practice into a room in the Nelson Hotel in Old Montreal, and started taking other politically charged cases. He would later note that the people who inspired him in his career, in addition to Frank Scott, included Oliver Wendell Holmes and Clarence Darrow. He defended labour activist Michel Chartrand on charges of sedition in 1969, and advocated many causes for judicial reform, including changing the law to allow women to sit on a jury.

=== October crisis ===
The association Lemieux had with the FLQ would later lead him into a prominent role in negotiating on their behalf when the October crisis broke out in 1970. These negotiations collapsed upon the introduction of emergency measures under the War Measures Act. His reputation for being a highly emotional, volatile showman led to his being detained for four months on charges of seditious conspiracy. The charges were heard in court in February 1971, and were later withdrawn.

During his career as a lawyer for the FLQ, Lemieux defended more than 30 terrorists and represented the members of the Chenier cell, the group behind the kidnapping of Quebec cabinet minister Pierre Laporte, who was strangled. Lemieux argued in court that Laporte's death was accidental and suggested Prime Minister Pierre Trudeau was partly responsible. "If Trudeau had not declared the War Measures Act, Pierre Laporte would never have died," Lemieux said. Arrests under the War Measures Act, he raged, were "a shameful game, nameless buffoonery and extraordinary farce."

He defended many of those arrested under the Act, as well as Laporte's kidnappers, Jacques Rose, Paul Rose, Francis Simard and Bernard Lortie. He later negotiated their exile to Cuba.

During the trial of one of his Chenier cell clients, he was sentenced to 30 months for contempt of court, of which he served 13 months.

=== Move to the North Shore ===
By 1974, Lemieux was a pariah in Montreal legal circles, and subsequently decided to move to Quebec's North Shore, where he pumped gasoline at a service station for a while until he was able to resume his law practice. He continued to be, in his words, "a ferocious Quebec separatist."

Lemieux supported himself by taking on union grievances and aboriginal claims. In 2001, he defended Maurice Boucher in a notable murder trial.

Lemieux died of natural causes in January 2008, and his funeral was held in Montreal. In reviewing his life and career, the Montreal Gazette observed, "Lemieux's views and associates were and are repugnant. But no one can doubt the sincerity of his beliefs."
