= October 1970 (film) =

English-language documentary about the October Crisis

- Written by: Wayne Grigsby; Peter Mitchell
- Directed by: Don McBrearty
- Starring: Patrick Labbé; Karine Vanasse, Fanny La Croix, Denis Bernard; Mark Day; Hugo Saint-Cyr; Gary Levert
- Theme music composer: Jonathan Goldsmith
- Original language: English

Production
- Producers: Laszlo Barna; Wayne Grigsby; David MacLeod
- Running time: 480 minutes

Original release
- Release: October 12 – November 30, 2006

October 1970 is an eight-part made-for-television series that played on Canadian television in October and November 2006. It is a dramatization of the actual events surrounding the October Crisis in the Canadian province of Quebec, when members of the militant separatist group Front de libération du Québec abducted British Trade Commissioner James Cross and then Pierre Laporte, the Vice-Premier and Minister of Labour of Quebec, the latter of whom they murdered.

== Cast ==
- Patrick Labbé as Julien Giguère
- Karine Vanasse as Christine (fictional character designed by combining Carole Devault with Louise Verreault)
- Denis Bernard as Pierre Laporte
- Hugh Thompson as McLeery
- Mathieu Grondin as Jacques Lanctôt
- Fanny La Croix as Louise Lanctôt
- Mark Day as Mark Lepage
- Gary Levert as Michel St-Louis (reporter)
- Eric Paulhus as Bernard Lortie
- Hugo Saint-Cyr as Paul Rose
- R.H. Thomson as James Cross
- Paul Doucet as Jean-Marc
- Derek Moran as Branko
- Paulino Nunes as Sgt Albert Lisacek

== Reception ==
October 1970 was severely criticised by articles of and letters to Le Devoir:

- How to become a hero "If he is still alive, [Giguère] must be dying of laughter»
- To be seen sep 12 on TV, the series in French "... clearly distorted for dramatisation purposes»
- Radio-Canada (the French-language counterpart of CBC) was doubtful of the series' quality
- Letters about the series October 1970, by Jacques Lanctôt himself
- CBC's series about FLQ: War, yes my colonel "... giving back life, against all historical obviousness, to the ludicrous idea of a plot aiming to institute a temporary government in October 1970."
