= Albert Lisacek =

Sûreté du Québec detective sergeant

Albert Lisacek (13 July 1933 – 20 November 2012), also known as "Kojak", was a Sûreté du Québec detective sergeant involved in a number of high-profile cases. He was considered by some to be Canada's toughest cop.

The son of Czechoslovak immigrants Mary and Joseph Lisacek, he was born in Montreal near "The Main". After being chased by group of bullies at the age of fifteen, he decided on a career in policing. He first worked as a private detective and joined the Sûreté du Québec in 1956. In 1963, Lisacek became a member of the holdup squad. He was known for bringing his Thompson submachine gun with him while breaking down doors during raids.

His methods of dealing with criminals sometimes fell outside of the law. In a 2008 interview, Lisacek remarked that if he was a policeman now, he would be fired on his first day on the job.

French criminal Jacques Mesrine planned to ambush Lisacek at a restaurant where the policeman frequently ate but Lisacek changed his routine.

Lisacek was on the scene when Pierre Laporte's body was discovered in October 1970 and later when three of the Front de libération du Québec kidnappers were arrested.

In 1972, Lisacek shot at a thief fleeing a robbery in Verdun and accidentally castrated him.

He was present at the 1975 raid where Richard Blass was gunned down by police. After a string of killings, Blass was located in a chalet in Val-David, in a region called Laurentides, north of Montreal. Lisacek reportedly allowed Blass time to put his pants on. When Blass exited the bedroom, police opened fire; the official explanation was that Blass had been armed, but in 2010, Lisacek told a journalist that Blass had only been 'wielding' a sock. Following this incident, Lisacek was assigned to a desk job. He left the force in 1981.

A character based on Lisacek appeared in the 2006 television miniseries about events from the October Crisis, October, 1970 .

Lisacek married his first wife Claudia in 1962; she died in 1999. He later married Jacqueline Richer.

He died in Montreal from cancer at the age of 79.

Lisacek claimed "I was good at getting rid of the bad people".
