= Mark Day (actor) =

Canadian actor, broadcaster and producer from Port Hawkesbury, Nova Scotia (born 1978)

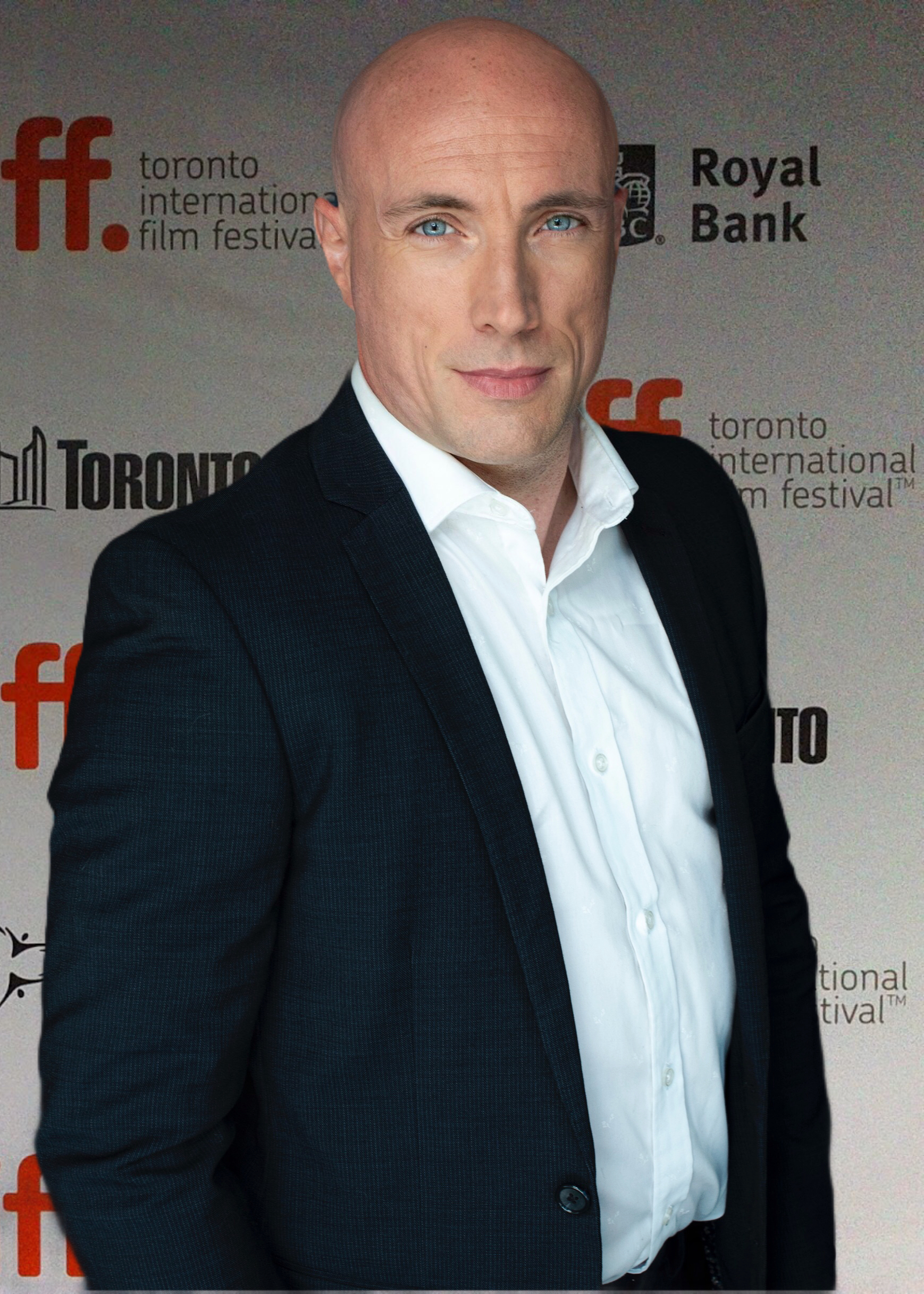
- Mark Day in 2018 at TIFF
- Born: October 4, 1978 (age 47); Port Hawkesbury, Nova Scotia, Canada
- Occupations: Actor; Producer; Broadcaster
- Years active: 1999–present
- Spouse: Kelly Hope Taylor (m. 2010)
- Children: 2
- Website: Mark Day Official Web Site

Mark Day (born October 4, 1978) is a Canadian actor and broadcaster from Port Hawkesbury, Nova Scotia.

== Career ==
=== 1999–2004: Halifax and Toronto ===
In the fall of 1999, Day moved to Halifax and made his feature film debut as a young fisherman in the 2000 film Deeply starring Kirsten Dunst. His other early film roles include Songs in Ordinary Time starring Sissy Spacek and Beau Bridges, A Glimpse of Hell starring James Caan, Julie Walking Home starring Miranda Otto and A Hole in One starring Meat Loaf and Michelle Williams.

While on the set of the TV movie, The Pilot's Wife, Day met actor Dax Ravina. The two formed a close friendship and collaborated with director Jay Dahl on two award-winning short films.

The first, Backjumping was shot in Halifax in the fall of 2003. It's described as fast-paced, clips over documentary interviews with Mike and Cameron, two sport fanatics who have tried and mastered it all. Feeling bored and unchallenged, they are looking for the next big thing in extreme sports.

The film debuted at the BFI London Film Festival and went on to win several best film awards around the world.

Following the success of Backjumping, Day, Ravina and Dahl reunited to film Boyclops, a comedy chronicling the trials of a one-eyed teenager engaged in an epic athletic contest with a two-eyed rival.

The film opened at the Toronto International Film Festival and Atlantic Film Festival in 2004.

Shortly after the film's release, Mark moved to Toronto.

=== 2004–2008: Toronto ===
Shortly after moving to Toronto, he landed a recurring role on the critically praised Showcase Television sitcom It's Me...Gerald.

In 2005, Day co-starred in the CBC Television pilot Cheap Draft, reuniting him with Dax Ravina and award-winning filmmaker Jay Dahl.

While shooting Cheap Draft, he auditioned for the 8-part, one hour mini series October 1970. Day was offered a supporting lead role, playing Mark Lepage, Pierre Laporte's cabinet aide. The show aired on CBC and was based on the October Crisis in Quebec involving the terrorist activities of the FLQ.

In 2006, Day co-hosted the inaugural season of CBC's Hockeyville. Mark traveled across Canada, meeting with communities vying for a chance to win $100,000 in arena upgrades and a National Hockey League hockey game. The initial four episodes were shot at the Memorial Centre in Kingston, Ontario, with the final three episodes shot in Dave Andreychuk Mountain Arena & Skating Centre in Hamilton, Ontario.

In 2008, Mark portrayed Leon Weeks in the CTV/CBS co-production police drama series Flashpoint (Ep.317 "The Good Citizen"). Shortly after shooting Flashpoint, Day landed a role in the pilot episode of the A&E drama series Breakout Kings, playing the role of Jimbo Cantrell.

=== 2009–Present: Toronto, Ottawa and Montreal ===
In 2009, Day appeared in the first of five season's on CBC Television The Ron James Show. He played various roles in 54 episodes of the comedy series, including the voices of Pa James and Cousin Davey in the L'il Ronnie cartoons.

After taking some time off from acting in 2014, Day returned to the screen in The Art of More, working alongside Dennis Quaid; Jacob's Wrath, which premiered at the Cannes Film Festival in 2017; and Mommy's Little Angel in 2018. His feature film credits include; Fatman, Mafia Inc and the upcoming thriller Misanthrope starring Shailene Woodley.

== Filmography ==
Year	Title	Role	Notes
2000	Deeply	Tough Hal	2000 Toronto International Film Festival
2000	Songs in Ordinary Time	Teen 1	CBS Television Studios
2001	Lexx	Soldier Evans	Sci-Fi
2001	Liocracy	Jim's Son	Comedy Network
2001	A Glimpse of Hell	Sailor 2	FX
2002	K-19: The Widowmaker	Russian Sailor 2	Toronto International Film Festival
2002	Julie Walking Home	Priest Harper	2001 Toronto International Film Festival
2003	Backjumping	Mike Pringle	Short Film, BFI London Film Festival
2003	Hole in One	Mark	Tribeca Film Festival
2004	Boyclops	Johnny	2004 Toronto International Film Festival
2004	Don't Break Up With Megan	Rodney	Atlantic Film Festival
2004	ReGenesis	Sam	Global Television Network
2005	It's Me...Gerald	Brad	5 Episodes, Showcase
2005	Cheap Draft	Leggs	Pilot, CBC Television
2005	Devil's Perch	Vikerton	TV Pilot
2006	Hockeyville	Host	7 Episodes, CBC Television
2006	Heartstopper	Medical Examiner	Feature Film
2007	October 1970	Mark Lepage	8 Episodes, CBC Television
2007	Adam Avenger	Tapps	Canadian Film Centre
2008	Flashpoint	Leon Weeks	CTV Television Network
2008	Breakout Kings	Jimbo Cantrell	A&E
2009-2014	The Ron James Show	Various	43 Episodes, CBC Television
2015	To Each His Own Devil	Mike	Feature Film
2016	Jacob's Wrath	Officer Murray	Short, Cannes Film Festival
2016	The Art of More	Doctor	Crackle
2017	Pregnant at 17	Clarke	Lifetime
2018	His Master's Voice	Agent James	Feature Film
2018	The Detectives	Officer Bugging	CBC Television, Episode: S01E02 "Project Hitchhiker"
2018	Mommy's Little Angel	Ben Gilby	Lifetime
2019	Twisted	Officer Church	
2020	Mafia Inc.	Billy McMahon	Feature Film
2020	Candy Cain Christmas	Greg Hansen	Hallmark
2020	Fatman	Soldier	Feature Film
2020	The Detectives	Officer Higginbottom	CBC Television, Episode: S03E03 "Starting Over"
2021	Daddy's Perfect Little Girl	Peter Green	Lifetime
2023	To Catch a Killer	Titch	Feature Film
2023	Lilly	Skoffin	Feature Film
2023	Transplant	Roy	CTV/NBC Television
2024	Streams Flow from A River	Officer Todd	Bell/TMN Television
2025	Billy The Kid	The Man	MGM+
2026	Heartland	Tanner	CBC
2026	The Deadly Score	Professor Alan Jackson	Lifetime
2026	In The Pines	Mike	META Productions
