= News Profile =

- Genre: News/Biography
- Directed by: Curt Laughlin; Barry McLean
- Presented by: Jan Tennant
- Country of origin: Canada
- Original language: English
- No. of seasons: 2

Production
- Editors: Bill Boyd; Dave Quance
- Running time: 15 minutes

Original release
- Network: CBC Television
- Release: 17 September 1972 – 26 May 1974

News Profile is a Canadian news and biography television program that aired on CBC Television from 1972 to 1974.

== Premise ==
Jan Tennant hosted this program in which each episode included a brief headline newscast followed by a feature on a particular personality.

== Profiles ==
Some of the people presented on News Profile included:

1972–1973 season

- Salvador Allende (Chilean president)
- Idi Amin (Ugandan president)
- Willy Brandt (German chancellor)
- Alan Eagleson (ice hockey)
- Francisco Franco (Spanish head of state)
- Edward Heath (British prime minister)
- Ferdinand Marcos (Philippine president)
- Juan Perón (Argentine president)

1973–1974 season

- Charles Best (insulin)
- Michel Couvin (Canadian Commissioner in South Vietnam)
- Richard J. Daley (Chicago mayor)
- Duke Ellington (musician)
- William Higgitt (RCMP Commissioner)
- Robert Lemieux (October Crisis lawyer)
- Peter Lougheed (Alberta premier)
- Georges Pompidou (French president)

== Scheduling ==
This 15-minute program was broadcast on Sundays at 12:30 p.m. (Eastern) from 17 September 1972 to 26 May 1974.
