= Octobre =

- Directed by: Pierre Falardeau
- Written by: Francis Simard (book); Pierre Falardeau
- Produced by: Marc Daigle
- Starring: Hugo Dubé; Luc Picard; Serge Houde
- Cinematography: Alain Dostie
- Edited by: Michel Arcand
- Music by: Richard Grégoire
- Production company: ACPAV
- Release date: 30 September 1994
- Running time: 97 min
- Country: Canada
- Language: French

Octobre is a 1994 Quebec film directed by filmmaker and noted independentist Pierre Falardeau. It tells a version of the October Crisis from the point of view of the Chénier Cell, the FLQ terrorist cell who in 1970 kidnapped and murdered Quebec minister and Deputy Premier Pierre Laporte, as reported to director Pierre Falardeau by Chénier Cell member Francis Simard during interviews in jail over a period of 5 years. The film is based on the 1982 book Pour en finir avec Octobre by Francis Simard, who was one of the members of the Chénier Cell. The film was co-produced by the National Film Board of Canada.

Dubé and Pierre Rivard won the 1994 Prix Guy-L'Écuyer for Octobre.

== Notable cast ==
- Maryse Ouellet
- Luc Picard
- Serge Houde

== See also ==
- Cinema of Quebec
- History of Quebec
