= Emergencies Act =

1988 Canadian law about emergency powers

Emergencies Act Loi sur les mesures d'urgence

Parliament of Canada
- Long title: An Act to authorize the taking of special temporary measures to ensure safety and security during national emergencies and to amend other Acts in consequence thereof
- Citation: RSC 1985, c 22 (4th Supp)
- Enacted by: Parliament of Canada
- Royal assent: July 21, 1988

Legislative history
- Bill citation: C-77, 33rd Parliament, 2nd session
- Introduced by: Perrin Beatty, Minister of National Defence
- First reading: June 26, 1987
- Second reading: November 2, 1987

Repeals
- War Measures Act
- Status: Current legislation

The Emergencies Act (French: Loi sur les mesures d'urgence) is a statute passed by the Parliament of Canada in 1988 which authorizes the Government of Canada to take extraordinary temporary measures to respond to public welfare emergencies, public order emergencies, international emergencies and war emergencies. The law replaces the War Measures Act passed in 1914. It asserts that any government action continues to be subject to the Canadian Charter of Rights and Freedoms and the Canadian Bill of Rights.

Under the Emergencies Act, the Cabinet of Canada can declare a national emergency in response to an urgent and critical situation that cannot be dealt with by any existing law, and either is beyond the capability of a province to deal with it or threatens the sovereignty of Canada. Before declaring a national emergency, the federal cabinet must consult with provincial cabinets. In the case of a public welfare or public order emergency where the effects of the emergency are confined to, or occur principally in, one province, the Emergencies Act cannot be used if the provincial cabinet does not indicate that the situation is beyond the capacity of the province to deal with it. Once an emergency is declared, it is subject to confirmation by the House of Commons and Senate.

The Emergencies Act has been invoked only once since it was enacted in 1988, in response to the Canada convoy protest in 2022. This invocation of the Emergencies Act was ruled unconstitutional, and this decision was upheld by the Federal Court of Canada upon the Government of Canada's appeal.

== History ==
=== Impetus and reform proposals ===
The impetus for reform of the War Measures Act came in October 1970 when members of the Front de libération du Québec (FLQ) kidnapped Pierre Laporte (the provincial labour minister) and British diplomat James Cross. These events, called the October Crisis, resulted in Prime Minister Pierre Trudeau invoking the War Measures Act for the first time during peacetime. During the October Crisis, concerns were raised in Parliament about instances of possible abuse of civil rights, and ineffective flow of information from Cabinet to Parliament.

Trudeau responded to the calls for reform during the October Crisis, stating on November 3, 1970, and January 11, 1971, that Parliament would consider creating new emergency legislation; however, new emergency legislation was not introduced while Trudeau was in office. Parliament considered forming a joint committee of the Senate and House of Commons to deliberate new emergency legislation in 1971 and 1977; however, both efforts were unsuccessful as agreement could not be reached on whether the mandate of such a committee would include an evaluation of the government's use of the War Measures Act in the October Crisis.

As new information came to light on the activities of the Royal Canadian Mounted Police's (RCMP) actions during the October Crisis, the Royal Commission of Inquiry into Certain Activities of the RCMP (McDonald Commission) was formed in 1977. Among the McDonald Commission's recommendations in its 1981 final report were several changes to Canada's emergency powers. The McDonald Commission recommended the War Measures Act be amended to focus on powers necessary during times of war, invasion or insurrection, while other emergencies would be dealt with by ad hoc legislation. The commission also recommended that the role of Parliament be increased during emergencies, including the requirement that Parliament confirm the state of emergency, renew the state of emergency, and, if not sitting, that it be summoned within seven days to make such a declaration. The commission further called for the information used by the government to declare an emergency be presented to Parliament publicly, with sensitive or classified materials being provided to an appropriate committee or during an in camera session of Parliament (private session). The McDonald Commission also called for: the power to create a new court to hear complaints from individuals whose rights had been infringed; the War Measures Act to state which elements of Canada's Bill of Rights would be notwithstanding during a declaration; and that Article 4 rights under the International Covenant on Civil and Political Rights never to be overridden.

Despite the McDonald Commission report being completed and released publicly in 1981, it was never tabled in Parliament or fully debated. The Task Force on Canadian Unity, established by the Government of Canada after the sovereigntist Parti Québécois was elected in Quebec in 1976 also called for reform of the War Measures Act, including a declaration of use providing the rationale, greater parliamentary oversight, safeguards for provincial powers, and safeguards for individual liberties.

Despite the calls and proposals for reform of the War Measures Act following the October Crisis, there was no change until the Emergencies Act was passed by Parliament in 1988. The Progressive Conservative Party under Brian Mulroney defeated the Liberal government under John Turner in the 1984 Canadian federal election, and in 1987 the Mulroney government released a white paper on reforming Canada's defence policy. It called for the creation of comprehensive emergency legislation, and the government commissioned a series of studies on emergency and defence topics. The studies considered four options for emergency legislation and recommended that a single comprehensive law be provided with four unique types of emergencies with unique powers, procedures and safeguards.

=== Legislative history ===
The Emergencies Act was introduced by Minister of National Defence Perrin Beatty in the second session of the 33rd Canadian Parliament as Bill C-77. Its first reading was on June 26, 1987, and second reading was on November 2, 1987. The bill received royal assent on July 21, 1988, replacing the War Measures Act. Parliament intended it to provide more civil rights protections and less likelihood for abuse of power than the War Measures Act.

A number of amendments were made to Bill C-77 between the second and third readings. The definition of "national emergency" and the situations under which the bill could be invoked was defined more restrictively to limit broad use. The definition which passed second reading was removed, "an urgent and critical situation of a temporary nature that imperils the well-being of Canada as a whole or that is of such proportions or nature as to exceed the capacity or authority of a province to deal with it" and replaced with two possible conditions, one which "seriously endangers the lives, health or safety of Canadians and is of such proportions or nature as to exceed the capacity or authority of a province to deal with it" or a condition which threatens the sovereignty of Canada. The reasoning for the change was the understanding that many emergencies were "urgent", "critical" or "temporary", but not sufficient in gravity for use of the Emergencies Act. Another amendment made after second reading allowed government decisions under a declared emergency to be reviewed by the courts based on whether the actions taken were reasonable.

== Provisions ==
Under the Emergencies Act, the Governor in Council (i.e., the federal cabinet) may declare that an emergency exists. The emergency must be a "national emergency", which means an "urgent and critical situation of a temporary nature" that either "(a) seriously endangers the lives, health or safety of Canadians and is of such proportions or nature as to exceed the capacity or authority of a province to deal with it, or (b) seriously threatens the ability of the Government of Canada to preserve the sovereignty, security and territorial integrity of Canada and that cannot be effectively dealt with under any other law of Canada".

The Emergencies Act contemplates four distinct types of emergencies: a public welfare emergency, a public order emergency, an international emergency, and a war emergency. It uses a "finely graded set of provisions" to respond to each type. The four categories of emergency are triggered in separate circumstances and a declaration of an emergency under each category gives the government a separate set of powers. Once Cabinet has declared an emergency, it can make orders in council or proclaim regulations pursuant to the declaration.

Under the Emergencies Act, a declaration of an emergency by the Cabinet must be reviewed by Parliament. Any temporary laws made under the act are subject to the Canadian Charter of Rights and Freedoms and the Bill of Rights, and must have regard to the International Covenant on Civil and Political Rights.

Once a national emergency is declared, a motion for confirmation of a declaration of emergency must be tabled in the Senate and House of Commons within seven days after a declaration of emergency is made by the Governor in Council. If either chamber is prorogued or in recess, its members must be recalled. If both chambers adopt the motion, the declared emergency remains in place for its original duration, subject to renewal (also subject to parliamentary scrutiny). Either chamber may end the emergency declaration by voting against it. Additionally, a Parliamentary Review Committee with representation from each recognized party must be formed. Within 60 days of the expiration of the emergency, the law requires the government to convene a public inquiry and table a report in Parliament within 360 days following the emergency's expiration.

=== Public welfare emergency ===
Part I of the Emergencies Act describes "public welfare emergencies" which result, or may result, in danger to life or property, services or resources, so serious as to be a national emergency. Public welfare emergencies include natural hazards such as fire, flood, drought, storm, or earthquakes; biological hazards including disease affecting humans, animals or plants; and man-made hazards such as accidents or pollution.

Section 7 of the act states a public welfare emergency declaration persists for 90 days, subject to being extended through another proclamation, or ended earlier.

=== Public order emergency ===
Part II of the Emergencies Act describes "public order emergency" results from serious threats to the security of Canada. When defining "threats to the security of Canada", the act references the definition provided in the Canadian Security Intelligence Service Act, which includes espionage, sabotage, detrimental foreign influences, activities which support the threat or use of violence for a political, religious or ideological objective; or those activities which threaten to undermine or otherwise destroy, or overthrow the Government of Canada. The Canadian Security Intelligence Service Act notes that "lawful advocacy, protest or dissent" do not constitute "threats to the security of Canada".

Section 18 of the act states a public order emergency declaration persists for 30 days, subject to being extended through another proclamation, or ended earlier.

=== International emergency ===
Part III of the Emergencies Act describes "international emergency", which results from acts of intimidation, coercion, or the real or imminent use of force from one or more other countries against Canada. An international emergency would fall short of an armed conflict which would permit a "war emergency", instead the international emergency was proposed for times of "heightened international tensions" and "rapid deterioration of relations among nations". Peter Rosenthal likened the purpose of an international emergency to events similar to the Cuban Missile Crisis. Under an international emergency, additional powers are provided to the government as it relates to supplies for national defence, including search and seizure as it relates to scarce commodities, hoarding, black market operations and fraud.

Section 29 of the act states an international emergency declaration persists for 60 days, subject to being extended through another proclamation, or ended earlier.

=== War emergency ===
Part IV of the Emergencies Act describes a "war emergency" which results from war or armed conflict involving Canada or an allied nation. While a "war emergency" provides the government with significant authority to make orders or regulation beyond the categorical limits of other emergencies, however, a war emergency does not provide the authority to implement conscription under the act.

Section 39 of the act states a war emergency declaration persists for 120 days, subject to being extended through another proclamation, or ended earlier.

== Analysis ==
According to the legal scholars Craig Forcese and Leah West, the Emergencies Act provides for "the stiffest government emergency powers of any emergency law in Canada".

The Emergencies Act does not delineate what role the courts may play during an emergency. Forcese and Aaron Freeman suggest that this leaves intact courts' ordinary powers of judicial review in Canadian administrative law and constitutional review under the Charter. Legal scholar Robert Martin argues that the act's requirement that the Governor in Council have "reasonable grounds" to believe that an emergency exists "leaves open the possibility of judicial review of the invocation of emergency powers".

Irvin Studin traces the federal government's power under the Emergencies Act to the peace, order, and good government clause in the Constitution Act, 1867.

== Uses ==
The Emergencies Act has been used once, in response to the Canada convoy protest in 2022. The War Measures Act, which the Emergencies Act replaced, was used on three occasions: during both the First and Second World Wars, and during the 1970 October Crisis.

=== Proposed use in response to the COVID-19 pandemic ===
On April 9, 2020, Prime Minister Justin Trudeau sent a letter to the provincial and territorial premiers to consult about invoking the Emergencies Act due to the COVID-19 pandemic in Canada. While consultation with the provinces is a required step before a national emergency can be declared, the Prime Minister's Office said there was no present plan to invoke it and that doing so remained a last resort. On a conference call between Trudeau and the premiers later that day, the premiers communicated their unanimous opposition to invoking the act.

=== Canada convoy protest ===
On February 14, 2022, during the Canada convoy protest, Prime Minister Justin Trudeau's government declared a public order emergency, invoking the Emergencies Act for the first time.

Under the Emergency Measures Regulations issued after the declaration of emergency, participation in public assemblies that could result in a breach of peace by disrupting the movements of goods and people, interfering with the operation of critical infrastructure, or by supporting violence, were prohibited. Travel to and within places where these rallies were occurring was restricted, and foreigners were barred from coming to Canada to attend them. The regulations also specifically outlawed the bringing of children under the age of 18 to these assembles. Additionally the use, provision, collection, and solicitation of property and funds to support the prohibited assemblies or the people participating in them was banned.

The regulations further empowered the federal government to protect critical infrastructure, Parliament Hill and the parliamentary precinct, official government residences and buildings, war monuments, and any other places designated by the minister of public safety. The federal government was also given the authority to compel the towing and removal of vehicles, structures, and other objects used in blockades. Violations of the regulations was punishable by up to five years' imprisonment, a fine up to $5,000, or both.

Under the Emergency Economic Measures Order, also issued pursuant to the declaration of emergency, crowdfunding platforms and their payment processors were required to register with the Financial Transactions and Reports Analysis Centre of Canada, and report large and suspicious transactions. Cryptocurrencies were also included in the expanded financial regulations. Banks were ordered to freeze personal and corporate bank accounts suspected of being used by people violating the regulations, and were protected from civil liability in enforcing the order. Insurance coverage for trucks being used in blockades was suspended. Furthermore, financial institutions had to determine on a continuing basis whether any persons violating the regulations were using their services and were required to promptly report findings to the RCMP or the Canadian Security Intelligence Service (CSIS).

In accordance with the requirements of the Emergencies Act the government introduced a motion for the confirmation of the declaration of emergency on February 17, and debate was planned to continue through the weekend with a vote scheduled for February 21 at 8:00 pm. Though interrupted by police operations against the protesters on February 18, debate otherwise proceeded as planned and the House of Commons voted to confirm use of the act 185 to 151, with the Liberals and New Democratic Party (NDP) in support, and the Conservatives and Bloc Québécois voting against the motion. Immediately after the vote, interim Conservative leader Candice Bergen filed a motion to revoke the declaration of emergency under section 59. Debate in the Senate began on February 22, with members required to take an oath of secrecy. A vote was expected as early as that evening but debate proved more contentious than anticipated with several senators challenging the government to disclose the basis for invoking and continuing the state of emergency, even as blockades and protests had been cleared.

==== Reactions ====
The announcement had varied reactions. Several provincial premiers expressed concerns, including the premiers of Alberta, Saskatchewan, Manitoba, and Quebec. Doug Ford, the premier of Ontario, the centre of the protest, expressed support for the measure. NDP leader Jagmeet Singh supported the measure, but said that its invocation was "proof of failure of leadership". The Canadian Civil Liberties Association criticized the declaration of emergency, saying that the "high and clear" threshold for invocation – that the situation cannot be resolved through the regular application of existing laws – had not been met, and that normalization of emergency legislation would erode democracy and civil liberties. On February 18, it filed for judicial review of the government's decision to invoke the Emergencies Act, claiming the invocation was unjustified and unconstitutional. The Canadian Constitution Foundation (CCF) announced intent to sue on similar grounds. On February 19, Alberta Premier Jason Kenney also said that the province would file a court challenge to the federal government's use of the law. A few days later, Saskatchewan Premier Scott Moe said that his province was also considering a court challenge. On February 20, Edward Snowden compared the freezing of bank accounts to similar actions by the Chinese and Russian governments, and commended the Canadian Civil Liberties Association for its challenge to the use of the law.

==== Opinion polling ====
Opinion polling conducted by Maru Public Opinion showed that 66 per cent of Canadians supported the use of the act. Support was highest in British Columbia, Quebec, and Atlantic Canada, with 75 per cent, 72 per cent, and 72 per cent of the populations in those regions supporting the invocation respectively, and with a majority in every province backing the use of the act. A poll by Mainstreet Research, conducted slightly later, on February 16 and 17, measured overall support and opposition at 51 per cent and 44 per cent respectively. Abacus Data found support at 57 per cent and opposition at 30 per cent in poll conducted between February 17 and 22. A poll conducted by Research Co between February 18 and the 20 found that 66 per cent believed the use of the act was justified, against 28 per cent who did not. A poll conducted by Nanos Research on February 23 and 24, after the declaration of emergency had been revoked, found support for the liberals' decision to invoke the act was at 63 per cent, and opposition at 36 per cent. Retrospective polling conducted by Angus Reid in May showed that 46 per cent of Canadians thought that the use of the act was necessary to clear out the protesters, 34 per cent thought that the police had sufficient powers to clear it without invoking the act, and 15 per cent opposed any government action to clear out the protesters.

==== Revocation ====
On February 23, Prime Minister Trudeau announced that the federal government would revoke the emergency declaration. Debate in the Senate was halted after the announcement. Later that day, the governor general signed a proclamation revoking it. Despite its revocation, the Canadian Civil Liberties Association and the province of Alberta said they would proceed with challenges to the use of the law.

==== Parliamentary review committee ====
In March, a joint parliamentary committee named the Special Joint Committee on the Declaration of Emergency (DEDC) began investigating the use of the act. The committee is composed of seven members of Parliament and four senators.

Various government officials testified before the committee on April 26, including Canadian Security Intelligence Service Director David Vigneault, RCMP Commissioner Brenda Lucki, Minister of Public Safety Marco Mendicino, and Minister of Justice David Lametti. Both Mendicino and Lametti invoked cabinet confidentiality in refusing to answer some questions.

==== Rouleau inquiry ====
On April 25, 2022, Trudeau appointed Justice Paul Rouleau as commissioner of an inquiry into the invocation of the Emergencies Act. The inquiry is independent of the parliamentary review committee. By law, the inquiry was required to complete its report and submit it to Parliament by February 20, 2023. The inquiry was scheduled initially to start on September 19 and run until October 28. Due to Justice Rouleau undergoing surgery, the inquiry was delayed, and the public hearings ran from October 13 to December 2.

A government press release said it is hoped investigations would "prevent these events from happening again". Conservatives said the investigations were too focused on the actions of protesters and their fundraising, and not on justifying the use of the Emergencies Act or determining whether it was appropriate for it to have been invoked.

On February 17, 2023, Justice Rouleau released his 2,000-page final report, finding that the Trudeau government met the "very high threshold" for invoking the Emergencies Act after failures by police and politicians to address the protests. Rouleau wrote that he reached his conclusion “with reluctance,” and that reasonable and informed people could come to a different conclusion. Rouleau found that the freezing of bank accounts should have included a "delisting mechanism" and that it was unjust for individuals with no connection to the protests to be affected, but called that "unavoidable". Rouleau criticized Trudeau for labelling the protesters a "fringe minority" during the protest, writing that the comments likely hardened their resolve and embittered them.

Rouleau also made various recommendations to the government to improve policing, information sharing, and amend the Act, asking the government to provide its response within a year of his report. Following the announcement, Trudeau said the government would respond within six months of the report. In August 2023, a government spokesperson said an update would be coming in "the coming days". A year after the report was released, no government response had been provided. In March 2024, Public Safety Minister Dominic LeBlanc said the government would need more time to respond, citing its appeal of a Federal Court ruling, and indicating steps could be taken at some point in the future.

==== Federal Court ruling and appeal ====
Canadian Frontline Nurses v. Canada (Attorney General)
- Court: Federal Court of Canada
- Decided: 2024-01-29
- Citation: 2024 FC 42
- Legislation cited: Emergencies Act

Court membership
- Judge sitting: Richard Mosley

On January 23, 2024, Judge Richard Mosley of the Federal Court ruled that the use of the Emergencies Act was unreasonable, ultra vires, because there did not exist a "national emergency" nor a "threat to national security" in the sense of the act. Further, he ruled that the regulations and orders made under the authority of the act had violated Section 2(b) and Section 8 of the Charter of Rights and Freedoms. The court found that the regulations were "overbroad", infringing on the freedom of expression of protesters who did not intend to breach the peace, and that collecting of financial information from banks and freezing of bank accounts had amounted to unreasonable search and seizure.

When asked about the ruling on the day of its release, Deputy Prime Minister Chrystia Freeland defended her government's actions, saying it was the correct decision at the time, and announced their intention to appeal. In February 2024, the government appealed the ruling. In January 2026, the Federal Court of Appeal rejected the appeal, ruling "that Cabinet did not have reasonable grounds to believe that a national emergency existed" and that "As disturbing and disruptive the blockades and the convoy protests in Ottawa could be, they fell well short of a threat to national security." The Court of Appeal also upheld the lower court's findings that the invocation had violated the Charter of Rights and Freedoms by limiting free expression and infringing on protester's rights against unreasonable search and seizure.

In March 2026, the government filed for leave to appeal to the Supreme Court of Canada, and on October 22, 2026, the court announced that it would hear the appeal.

== Works cited ==
- Atkey, Ronald G. (1991). "Reconciling Freedom of Expression and National Security". University of Toronto Law Journal. 41 (1): 38–59. doi:10.2307/825701. ISSN 0042-0220. JSTOR 825701.
- Emergency Preparedness Canada (1987). Bill C-77: An Act to Provide for Safety and Security in Emergencies: Working Paper (PDF). Ottawa: Emergency Preparedness. OCLC 977659651.
- Forcese, Craig; Freeman, Aaron (2005). The Laws of Government: The Legal Foundations of Canadian Democracy. Irwin Law. pp. 585–596. ISBN 1-55221-105-3. OCLC 60416249.
- Forcese, Craig; West, Leah (2021). "Emergencies". National Security Law (2nd ed.). Irwin Law. ISBN 978-1-55221-611-8. OCLC 1281711237. SSRN 3554318.
- Holthuis, Annemieke E. (1991). The Emergencies Act, the Canadian Charter of Rights and Freedoms, and International Law: The Protection of Human Rights in States of Emergency (L.L.M.). McGill University. OCLC 1265038446.
- Holthuis, Annemieke (1993). "Maxwell Cohen's Perspective on Human Rights in Canada: The Entrenchment of the Charter and the Enactment of the Emergencies Act". In Kaplan, William; McRae, Donald (eds.). Law, Policy and International Justice: Essays in Honour of Maxwell Cohen. McGill–Queen's University Press. pp. 207–242. ISBN 978-0-7735-6427-5. OCLC 243500608.
- Martin, Robert (2005). "Notes on Emergency Powers in Canada". University of New Brunswick Law Journal. 54: 161–177. ISSN 0077-8141.
- Rosenthal, Peter (1991). "The New Emergencies Act: Four Times the War Measures Act". Manitoba Law Journal. 20 (3): 563–599. ISSN 0076-3861. 1991 CanLIIDocs 129.
- Stacey, Jocelyn (2018). "Vulnerability, Canadian Disaster Law, and the Beast". Alberta Law Review. 55 (4): 853–888. doi:10.29173/alr2480. ISSN 1925-8356. S2CID 158539719. 2018 CanLIIDocs 85.
- Studin, Irvin (2014). The Strategic Constitution: Understanding Canadian Power in the World. University of British Columbia Press. ISBN 978-0-7748-2716-4. OCLC 870269277.
- Weinrib, Lorraine E. (2001). "Terrorism's Challenge to the Constitutional Order". In Macklem, Patrick; Roach, Kent; Daniels, Ronald J. (eds.). The Security of Freedom: Essays on Canada's Anti-Terrorism Bill. University of Toronto Press. pp. 93–108. ISBN 978-1-4426-8233-7. OCLC 244768716.
