= Hugo St-Cyr =

Canadian actor

Hugo St-Cyr (November 23, 1978 – September 24, 2015) was a Canadian actor and presenter. He became known for his role as Michel Couillard in the popular youth series Watatatow, which aired for fourteen years on Radio-Canada Television from 1991 to 2005. This role earned him five MetroStar prizes and Gemini Awards.

== Biography ==
Saint-Cyr was born in Longueuil. Alongside Vincent Bolduc (Alexis) in 1993, he played the prominent role of Clément Fortin, a teenager who commits suicide in the dramatic TVA series Ent'Cadieux, written by Guy Fournier.

He played the role of Paul Rose in the miniseries October 1970, tracing the tragic events that occurred in October 1970 in Quebec. It was broadcast on CBC Television and Télé-Québec.

Since 2007, he hosted the show Podium Xtrême on Ztélé, dealing with emission technology in extreme sports. In the winter, he hosted The Car Guide on the channel Vox in Montreal.

On September 25, 2014, Echos Vedettes magazine revealed that he was suffering from cancer of the bone and undergoing chemotherapy. He died from this on September 24, 2015. He had two daughters with actress Isabelle Guérard.

== Honours ==
- 1992 winner Gemini Awards, best dramatic interpretation Youth Program or Series for 'Watatatow'
- 1997 winner Price MetroStar, best artist for Youth 'Watatatow'
- 1998: Award-winning MetroStar, best artist for Youth 'Watatatow'
- 1999: Award-winning MetroStar, best artist for Youth 'Watatatow'
- 2000: Award-winning MetroStar, best artist for Youth 'Watatatow'
- 2001: Price MetroStar winner, for best young artist 'Watatatow'

== Filmography ==
=== Actor ===
- 1991–2005: Watatatow, Michel Couillard
- 1993–1994: Ent'Cadieux, Clément Fortin
- 1998: Une voix en or, drummer
- 1998: Un gars, une fille, François-Xavier
- 1999: Operation Tango, the Soldier Dalpé
- 2003: Harmonium (miniseries), Yves Ladouceur
- 2004: Jack Paradise: Montreal by Night (Jack Paradise: Les nuits de Montréal), Dan Langlais
- 2007: October 1970, Paul Rose
- 2008: Transit, the butcher

=== Moderator ===
- 2007: The Car Guide (Vox)
- 2007: Podium Xtrême (Ztélé)
