= Studin =

Studin is a surname. Notable people with the surname include:

- Irvin Studin, Canadian academic, publisher, and writer
- Marin Studin (1895–1960), Croatian sculptor
