= Néfertari Bélizaire =

Haitian–Canadian actress (1962–2017)

Néfertari Bélizaire (1962–2017) was a Haitian-born Canadian actor.

== Early life ==
Born in Haiti on 9 August 1962, Bélizaire spent her early childhood in New York, where she lived until the age of seven. She returned briefly to Haiti before immigrating to Quebec, Canada, where she lived in Thetford Mines, Lévis and Quebec City, before studying acting at the CEGEP theatre school in Saint-Hyacinthe.

== Career ==
Upon graduation, she was quickly cast into significant roles in several productions including Andromaque, Les Sorcières de Salem, Iphigenia, Le chapeau de plomb, The Merchant of Venice and, in 2014, Les Innocentes. She has performed at the La Nouvelle Compagnie Théâtrale, the Théâtre Jean-Duceppe, the Théâtre du Nouveau Monde and the Théâtre du Rideau Vert, among others. She also performed on television in L'Héritage, Watatatow and in La Galère. She was nominated at the 1995–1996 Soirée des Masques for best performance in a supporting role in the play Le Chapeau de plomb.

On 2 June 1986, on the occasion of the visit to Montreal of Desmond Tutu, the South African archbishop, Bélizaire starred in a performance staged in his honour. She appeared on the stage of the Salle Wilfrid-Pelletier of Place des Arts in the leading role of an original work by Maryse Pelletier entitled Blanc Noir sur Noir, directed by Alain Fournier, with music by Robert Léger and Michel Rivard, and also featuring Eudore Belzile, Fayolle Jean, Robert Marien and Patrice Robergeau. It was for this show that the song "C'est un mur" was created and performed by Michel Rivard.

In 2014 she published a memoir, entitled Cru, in which she revealed that she'd been sexually abused by her uncle as a child. Bélizaire worked to raise awareness of violence against women and children in Quebec, and of youth suicide prevention.

== Death ==
She died on 19 February 2017, at the Hôtel-Dieu Hospital in Quebec, following pneumonia. She was 54 years old.

== Acting credits ==
=== Television ===
- 1987: Poivre et Sel (television series) - Sonia
- 1988–1990: L'Héritage, (television series) - Erzulie Maurice
- 1992: Urban Angel (television series) - Woman at riot
- 1994–1995: À nous deux! (television series) - Marguerite Lechêne
- 1994–1998: Watatatow (television series) - Josée
- 1999: Juliette Pomerleau, (limited series) - Garde Doyon
- 2001–2003: Mon meilleur ennemi (television series) - Josette Toussaint
- 2002–2003: Music Hall (television series) - Denise
- 2007–2013: La Galère (television series) - Mère de Claude Milonga
- 2011: 30 vies - Chloé Saint-Jésus
- 2012: Trauma - Mariam Batié
- 2015: Ces gars-là - Agathe

=== Theatre ===
- 1995–1996: Le Chapeau de plomb - Anna
- 2003: Au bout du fil - Bémol
- 2003: Appelez-moi... Maman ! (comment survivre à la maternité) - Une mère
- 2014: Les Innocentes - Agathe
