= Bernard Lortie =

Member of a militant Quebec separatist group

Bernard Lortie (born c. 1951) of Gaspé, Quebec, Canada was a member of the Chenier Cell of the Front de libération du Québec (FLQ) who were responsible for a decade of bombings and armed robberies in the province of Quebec.

During what became known as the October Crisis, on October 5, 1970, members of the FLQ's Liberation Cell kidnapped the British Trade Commissioner James Cross from his Montreal home as part of a violent attempt to overthrow the elected government and to establish a socialist Quebec state independent of Canada. On October 10, Bernard Lortie, along with Chenier Cell leader Paul Rose and his brother, Jacques Rose, and Francis Simard, kidnapped and then murdered Quebec Vice Premier and Cabinet Minister, Pierre Laporte. Believing many others would follow in an uprising, their goal was to create an independent state based on the ideals of Fidel Castro's Cuba.

On November 6, 1970, Bernard Lortie was arrested when the police raided the hiding place of the FLQ's Chenier cell. Although the other three members escaped the raid, they were later captured in St-Luc, Quebec in late December. All four members were charged with the kidnapping and murder of Pierre Laporte. For his part in the kidnapping and murder, Bernard Lortie was sentenced to 20 years in jail. He was granted parole by the Canadian Parole Board after seven years.
