= Richard Blass =

Canadian criminal (1945–1975)

- Born: 24 October 1945; Rosemont, Montreal, Quebec, Canada
- Died: 24 January 1975 (aged 29); Val-David, Quebec, Canada
- Cause of death: Shot by police
- Other name: "Le Chat"

Richard Blass (24 October 1945 – 24 January 1975) was a Canadian gangster and a multiple murderer. Born in Montreal, he was nicknamed Le Chat, French for The Cat, because of his luck in evading death after surviving at least three assassination attempts and a police shootout, and escaping from custody twice. Blass is also known for his involvement in the Gargantua bar attack, in which 13 people died.

== Criminal career ==
Born in the Montreal neighbourhood of Rosemont, Blass would turn to amateur boxing as a way to channel his anger when he was a child. It was after a boxing fight that Blass committed one of his first known crimes, attacking fellow boxer Michel Gouin with a knife after losing a fight to him. Blass pleaded guilty to assault and spent one night in jail.

Over time Blass became more obsessed with the Mafia activity going on in New York City. As obsessed as he was with the Mafia, however, he was also known for his hatred of Mafia families: resenting the fact that the Italian Mafia had a stranglehold on Montreal's underworld business during the late 1960s, Blass was involved in violent feuds with many Mafiosi, particularly those related to Frank Cotroni and brothers Joe and Vincenzo Di Maulo. On 7 May 1968, Blass and Robert Allard ambushed Cotroni outside his home; two of his bodyguards were killed, but Cotroni escaped. He also worked as a hitman for the notorious West End Gang.

On 4 May 1968, the Cotroni family struck back by killing two of Blass's men, Gilles Bienvenue and Albert Ouimet, who were shot down by masked gunmen. On 7 May 1968, another Blass gang member, Roger Larue, was killed.

By then, Blass had a sizable number of members in his own gang. Blass and his gang became more violent, committing a number of murders against Italians, some of whom had nothing to do with crime. The first such killing took place on 27 May, when Giuseppe Collizza was killed with five shots to the head. One of the persons that Blass and his group killed, Francesco Grado, had connections to the Mafia. Grado was a loan shark for the Mafia. He was murdered with multiple gunshots.

On 24 August 1968, the first Mafia attempt against Blass's life took place, when two hired gunmen entered a bar where Blass was enjoying some drinks. Although shot at multiple times, Blass escaped unscathed.

Two weeks later, Blass was tracked by the Mafia to a motel named "Le Manoir de Plaisance" in a Montreal suburb. The motel was set on fire and three people died, but Blass escaped the blaze. Police investigation indicated arson as the fire's cause.

In October 1968, Blass was injured by bullet shots to the head and back after being ambushed, alongside partner Claude Ménard, inside a garage. the gunman was Joe Di Maulo. The two survived; Ménard drove the car they were in through the garage's door, though Blass required hospitalization for his wounds. He refused to identify his attackers, a fact which may have led him to earn respect among Canadian Mafia members.

In January 1969, Blass and his gang tried to commit a bank robbery, but the attempt failed, and Blass shot a policeman as he was fleeing from the financial institution. He was arrested and sentenced to four consecutive terms of ten years in jail. On 6 May 1969, Vincenzo Di Maulo killed one of Blass's associates.

On October 16 of that year, Blass became a fugitive for the first time, when he and other prisoners overpowered a jail guard and fled the van in which they were being transported to court. Blass was caught after an anonymous caller informed police that he was hiding in his wife's apartment.

Five years later in 1974, he perpetrated his second escape. An unidentified female friend of his smuggled in some firearms during a visit, and Blass broke the jail visitor's window. Armed with various types of guns and rifles, he and other men were able to escape.

Blass wanted to kill Raymond Laurin and Roger Lévesque, both of whom had participated in the 1969 bank robbery and testified against him. He found them both at a bar on 30 October 1974, and shot them dead. Convinced that he needed to kill all witnesses to the killings, Blass and gang partner Fernand Beaudet returned to the bar on 21 January 1975. They locked ten men and three women inside a bar locker before killing all of them.

== Death ==
What followed that act was one of the largest manhunts in Canadian history. On 24 January 1975, police located the chalet in Val-David where Blass was hiding. At 1:30 am EST, three officers, led by Albert Lisacek, broke the windows of the chalet door and entered. As Blass approached them, the officers opened fire, and Blass was hit by 27 bullets, dying within seconds. Police reports and testimony stated that Blass had shot first; however, in May 2012, Lisacek told journalist Warren Perley that Blass had been unarmed, and had only been 'wielding' a sock. He was entombed at the Notre Dame des Neiges Cemetery in Montreal.

== Depictions ==
The 1992 film Requiem for a Handsome Bastard (Requiem pour un beau sans-coeur) is loosely based on Blass' career. The film centres around the last three days of a fictionalized, pseudonymous version of Blass. A book about Blass was published in 1983 by famous criminal lawyer Frank Shoofey, who previously represented him.
