= Gargantua bar attack =

1975 shooting and arson in Montreal, Canada

- Location: 45.5411595°N 73.5988091°W; Montreal, Quebec, Canada
- Date: January 21, 1975
- Attack type: Arson, shooting
- Deaths: 13
- Injuries: 0
- Perpetrator: Richard Blass

The Gargantua bar attack was a shooting and arson-attack that occurred at the Gargantua, a nightclub bar located on 1369 rue Beaubien Est in Montreal, Quebec, Canada on January 21, 1975, killing 13 individuals, including the manager. The Gargantua, which had been known for being a meeting place for underworld figures, was previously the scene of a double-shooting killing of two criminals in October 1974.

During the attack, the Gargantua's manager, believed to having been a witness to the preceding shooting, was shot and killed. The remaining 12 individuals succumbed to asphyxiation after being herded into a padlocked closet shortly before the establishment was set on fire. Three days following the attack, criminal Richard Blass, the primary suspect, was shot and killed by police.

== Background ==
Located on 1369 rue Beaubien Est in Montreal, Quebec, Canada, the Gargantua was a second-floor nightclub bar located above a dry cleaning establishment, and had been well known as a meeting place for underworld figures.

On October 30, 1974, two armed men entered the Gargantua and fatally shot 30-year-old Raymond Laurin and 28-year-old Roger Levesque. One week prior to the shooting, suspects Richard Blass and his accomplice Roger Roussel had escaped from the Saint-Vincent-de-Paul penitentiary, which Blass had been serving a 15-year sentence for attempted murder and armed robbery. The victims, Laurin and Levesque, had a prior criminal association with the suspects, and were implicated in a crime together in 1969. Roussel would later be recaptured.

== Attack ==
On January 21, 1975, two individuals entered the Gargantua and held 13 individuals, ten men and three women, at gunpoint. According to a police reconstruction conducted shortly after the attack, the perpetrators fatally shot 43-year-old Rejean Fortin, the Gargantua's manager and a former Montreal police officer. Additionally, 29-year-old customer Pierre Lamarche was shot in the stomach, wounding him. The remaining victims, along with Fortin's body and the injured Lamarche, were herded into a storage closet measuring 6 by 8 feet. The closet door was padlocked and barricaded by pushing a jukebox against it, and the perpetrators set fire to the establishment.

The bodies of the victims were discovered by firemen at the scene after responding to a report of a fire at the Gargantua shortly past midnight. Initially under the impression that the Gargantua was empty, firemen found the bodies of the 13 victims in the closet. Lamarche and the remaining 11 victims succumbed to asphyxiation. Both inspectors and firefighters indicated the fire appearing to have been deliberately set near the outside of the closet door.

== Investigation and legal proceedings ==
Immediately following the attack, authorities began investigating its potential connection to the October 30, 1974 shooting of Laurin and Levesque. Despite lacking concrete evidence, investigators suspected the involvement of Blass in the attack, suspecting his motive being to target Fortin as a witness to the earlier shooting, with the other victims being killed to eliminate witnesses to Fortin's shooting. The search for Blass, who became the prime suspect in the attack, intensified, with a coroner's warrant being issued for his arrest.

In the early hours of January 24, 1975, three days after the attack, authorities shot and killed Blass in Val-David, located in the Laurentian Mountains. Acting on a tip, they surrounded a chalet around 4:30 am, and Blass was reportedly shot after responding to police orders with gunfire, though this has been disputed several decades later. Authorities additionally apprehended a man and two women at the scene, and ruled out the suspected motive of eliminating witnesses.

In early February, a reliable source testified and indicated involvement of more than one gunman in the attack. On February 5, 1975, special coroner Cyrille Delâge held 28-year-old Fernand Beaudet criminally responsible for the attack. Beaudet, according to a wiretapped conversation, admitted his involvement to his sister. Blass was also implicated involvement according to additional conversations presented at the inquest, resulting in him also being held responsible for the attack. During the inquest, Beaudet was sentenced to 30 days in jail for contempt of court after refusing to testify, shouting "I mourn the death of Richard Blass! Long live Richard Blass!" The proceeding marked the first time wiretraps were accepted as evidence in a Canadian coroner's inquest. On March 13, 1975, murder charges against Beaudet were dropped due to lack of evidence, and he was never being brought to trial. During the preliminary hearing, Beaudet's girlfriend testified, admitting to lying during the coroner's inquest and to the police. Additionally, the telephone conversation between Beaudet and his sister, taking place hours after the attack, concluded that he had made no mention of the attack.

== See also ==
- List of fires in Canada
- Blue Bird Café fire, another arson-related attack at a Montreal nightclub in 1972

== Bibliography ==
- Lane, Brian; Gregg, Wilfred (2004). The encyclopedia of mass murder. New York: Carroll & Graf. ISBN 978-0-7867-1356-1.
