= It's Me...Gerald =

Canadian television sitcom

It's Me...Gerald is a Canadian television sitcom that aired on Showcase Television in 2005.

The show, based on the 2004 mockumentary film Gerald L'Ecuyer: A Filmmaker's Journey, stars Canadian actor and director Gerald L'Ecuyer as a fictionalized version of himself, in a format which somewhat resembles the American comedy series Curb Your Enthusiasm. L'Ecuyer, the character, is a struggling gay theatre director trying to stage a production of Hedda Gabler, who gets involved in various misadventures as he tries to find, through any means necessary, the money to finance his vision while a camera crew documents his efforts.

The cast also includes Beau Starr, Mark Day, William Kozy, Mary McLaughlin, Kristen Thomson and Tom McCamus. The series was created by writer-producers Gail Cook and John McLaughlin in conjunction with L'Ecuyer.
