= Francis Simard =

Quebec nationalist and convicted murderer

- Born: June 2, 1946; Val-Paradis, Quebec
- Died: January 10, 2015 (aged 68); Montreal, Quebec
- Occupations: activist, writer
- Known for: kidnapping and murder of Pierre Laporte

Francis Simard (June 2, 1946 – January 10, 2015) was a Quebec nationalist and convicted murderer. Simard was a member of the Chénier Cell of the Front de libération du Québec (FLQ), a group dedicated to the creation of an independent Marxist state out of the Canadian province of Quebec. Members of the group were responsible for the events known as the October Crisis.

As a member of the Rassemblement pour l'indépendance nationale political party, he met Paul Rose and the two became involved in revolutionary activities in 1969 when Simard campaigned for the development of the French language in McGill University, one of Montreal's English-language universities. During what became known as the October Crisis, on October 5, 1970, members of the FLQ's Liberation Cell kidnapped the British Trade Commissioner James Cross from his Montreal home as part of a violent attempt to overthrow the elected government and to establish a Marxist Quebec state independent of Canada. On October 10, Francis Simard, along with Chenier Cell leader, Paul Rose and his brother, Jacques Rose and Bernard Lortie, kidnapped and then murdered Quebec vice premier and cabinet minister Pierre Laporte. Believing many others would follow in an uprising, their goal was to create an independent state based on the ideals of Fidel Castro's Cuba. In 1982, Simard described the murder of Laporte as "a sincere gesture to show that what we were saying was not just words."

On May 20, 1971, Simard was sentenced to life imprisonment for the murder of Pierre Laporte. He was given parole in 1982. Simard wrote a book published in 1982 about the October Crisis titled Pour en finir avec octobre. In 1994, Quebec film director Pierre Falardeau made a movie from it titled Octobre. Simard died of a ruptured aneurysm in Montreal on January 10, 2015.

== Bibliography ==
- Simard, Francis, Talking it out : the October Crisis from inside, Montreal, Guernica, 1987 (translated by David Homel)
- Simard, Francis, Pour en finir avec Octobre, Stanké, Montreal, 1982.
