= Chénier Cell =

Front de libération du Québec cell

The Chénier Cell, also known as the South Shore Gang, was a Montreal-based Front de libération du Québec (FLQ) cell responsible for the bombing, armed robbery and kidnapping that led to the October Crisis in 1970.

== Background ==
The Chénier Cell was named after the Lower Canada Rebellion patriote movement leader Jean-Olivier Chénier. A violent Quebec sovereignty movement, the Chénier Cell attempted to usurp the elected Government of Quebec and create a Québécois people's uprising to establish a new Quebec state independent of Canada. The four known members of the Chénier Cell were: Paul Rose, Jacques Rose, Francis Simard and Bernard Lortie.

== Timeline ==
On October 5, 1970, members of another Montreal-based FLQ cell, the Liberation Cell, kidnapped the United Kingdom Trade Commissioner James Richard Cross from his Montreal home.

On October 8, 1970, the FLQ Manifesto was broadcast by CBC/Radio-Canada as one of the many demands required for the release of James Cross. The manifesto criticised big business, the Catholic Church, René Lévesque, Robert Bourassa and declared Pierre Trudeau "a queer".

On October 10, 1970, the Chénier Cell kidnapped the Vice-Premier of Quebec and Labour Minister, Pierre Laporte. The kidnappers approached Laporte, while he was playing football with his nephew on his front yard and forced him into their vehicle at gunpoint. The members of the Chénier Cell believed many other Québécois people would follow them in an uprising to create an independent state.

On October 15, 1970, the Government of Quebec put forward a request for the Canadian Armed Forces to support the Service de police de la Ville de Montréal.

On October 16, 1970, the Government of Canada proclaimed the existence of a state of "apprehended insurrection" under the War Measures Act. These emergency regulations outlawed the FLQ and made membership a criminal act. In addition, normal liberties were suspended and arrests and detentions were authorized without charges.

On October 17, 1970, the day after the Government of Canada invoked the War Measures Act, the Chénier Cell announced that they had executed Laporte. Laporte was found strangled in the back of a stolen motor vehicle abandoned near the Montreal Saint-Hubert Longueuil Airport.

In late December 1970, four weeks after the members of the Liberation Cell were found by authorities, the Chénier Cell members were located in a farmhouse basement at Saint-Luc, Quebec. The Chénier Cell members were put on trial and three were convicted for kidnapping and murder, while Jacques Rose was convicted of being an accessory after the fact with all members pleading "responsible".

== See also ==
- Timeline of the Front de libération du Québec
- List of terrorist attacks in Canada
