= Watatatow =

Canadian television series

- Country of origin: Canada
- Original language: French
- No. of seasons: 13
- No. of episodes: 1,220

Production
- Running time: 30 minutes
- Production company: Vivaclic

Original release
- Network: Radio-Canada
- Release: September 17, 1991 – February 21, 2005

Watatatow is a Canadian French-language children/youth television series, that aired from 1991 to 2005 on Radio-Canada. The first show aired on September 17, 1991. 104 half-hour episodes were filmed every year; they were shown four afternoons a week on Radio-Canada. Watatatow helped launch the careers of several young actors, including Hugo St-Cyr, Michel Goyette, Élise Aussant, Serge Postigo, Robert Brouillette, Suzanne Clément, Isabelle Guérard, Fabien Cloutier, Cas Anvar, Annie Cotton and Néfertari Bélizaire.

The name "Watatatow" was invented by the show's producers; its meaning is simply an expression of joy.

Actors on the show were of varying ages, sizes, physical abilities, looks and ethnicities, and generally were presented as real people with real problems. Characters on the show dealt with a wide variety of social and personal issues, including sexual harassment, pregnancy, clinical depression, substance abuse, anorexia and cults.

The first Watatatow DVD, which contained forty 'highlight' episodes from the first season, was released in November 2005. The DVD box set of highlights from the second season was released on October 31, 2006.

== Cast ==
- Joel Drapeau-Dalpe Julien Gauthier 2
- Normand D'amour Denis Gosselin
- Anne Fromm Kim
- Patrice Dubois Patrice
