= La Galère =

- Genre: Serial
- Created by: Renée-Claude Brazeau
- Starring: Hélène Florent; Brigitte Lafleur; Anne Casabonne; Geneviève Rochette
- Country of origin: Canada
- No. of seasons: 6
- No. of episodes: 62

Production
- Running time: 45 minutes

Original release
- Network: Ici Radio-Canada Télé
- Release: February 13, 2007 – November 18, 2013

La Galère is a 62-episode French-language television series created by Renée-Claude Brazeau, produced by Quebec-based Cirrus Communications and broadcast from 2007 to 2013 by Radio-Canada.

== Synopsis ==
In the 1990s, four friends get together at a party and write their future aspirations on pieces of paper and put them into a bottle, promising that one day they will read them together.

About fifteen years later, Stéphanie, Claude, Isabelle and Mimi each have different professional and romantic lives but are still best friends. One evening they break open the bottle, read the wishes and decide to fulfil Stéphanie's wish: that all four might live together for a year with their children in a house without men.

After the four women and seven children seek a large enough house, the elderly Mme. Baers offers them accommodation. The women and their children — except for Isa, who wants to remain with her minister husband — move in together but concoct a plan to make her change her mind.

Three of the women and their children — Isabelle, the holdout, wants to remain with her minister husband — move in together and devise a plan to make her change her mind.

== Principal Characters ==
- Stéphanie Valois: A successful novelist who has many confrontations with Martin, her publisher. Her three children have three different fathers, from whom she is separated. Her eldest, Hugo, is a teenager whose father, Michel, takes no part in parenting him. Stéphanie's two younger children are Elle and Tom, whose respective fathers sometimes take care of them. Stéphanie is a strong, resourceful woman who often lies to those close to her to avoid hurting them.
- Claude Milonga: An office clerk, she lives with her boyfriend, Antoine, who is unable to complete an essay he has been writing. They have a daughter, Fred, and a possibly gay son, Camille. Claude is fierce, somewhat devious, direct and especially attracted to rich men. She is unaware that as she is about to separate from him, Antoine inherits $4 million. Eventually she learns that she was adopted, and Antoine helps her search for her biological mother, discovering that they have the same personality.
- Mimi May: A beautician, she is candid and eager for love, but is regularly disappointed by her lovers. She is religious and prays often, and likes to read fortune cookie predictions. Mimi has a baby, Dominic, at the end of the third season and realizes that it is not always happiness to be a mother. Unfortunately, the daughter's father, who is a Catholic priest, returns to the church and its demands for a celibate life, and Mimi finds herself raising her baby alone.
- Isabelle Lévy: A former lawyer, she is married to Jacques, a minister. He often cheats on her, hiding his affairs from her with clever lies. They have a daughter, Lou, and a son, Sam, a developmentally delayed two-year-old. Isa highly values honesty and discipline. At first very close to Jacques, her friends will help her to become independent again. She learns that she has premature Alzheimer's.
