= Irvin Studin =

Canadian academic and footballer (born 1976)

- Born: 1976 (age 49–50); Rome, Italy
- Citizenship: Canadian
- Occupations: Professor, publisher, editor, writer
- Board member of: The Institute for 21st Century Questions; Global Brief Magazine
- Awards: Rhodes Scholarship (1999); Governor General's Gold Medal (2011); Bryden Alumni Award (2014)

Academic background
- Education: Aurora High School
- Alma mater: York University (BBA, PhD); University of Oxford (MA); London School of Economics (MSc)

Academic work
- Discipline: Philosophy, politics and economics, international relations, constitutional law
- Sub-discipline: Public policy, Geopolitics, Arctic studies, National security, Foreign policy, Canadian studies, Federalism, Russian studies, Education
- Notable works: The Strategic Constitution; What is a Canadian?; Global Brief Magazine
Association football career
- Position: Midfielder
Youth career
- 1995-1999: York Lions
Senior career*
Years	Team	Apps	(Gls)
1997	Toronto Lynx	1	(0)
1998	Glen Shields		
1999	York Region Shooters	14	(0)
International career
1997-1999	Canada (Maccabiah Games)		
- * Club domestic league appearances and goals

Irvin Studin (born 1976) is a Canadian academic, publisher, and writer. He is the President of The Institute for 21st Century Questions, a Canadian think tank, and the Founder, Editor-in-Chief and Publisher of Global Brief magazine. He also chairs the Worldwide Commission to Educate All Kids (Post-Pandemic), an international initiative addressing the ouster of hundreds of millions of children from all education during the COVID-19 pandemic school closures.

He was a two-time All-Canadian and captain of the York University Varsity Soccer Team. He earned two Blues with Oxford University's varsity soccer team.

== Education, academic, and policy career ==
Having attended York University as a President's Scholar, he graduated in 1999 with a Bachelor of Business Administration degree from the Schulich School of Business. In the same year, Studin was given the Murray G. Ross Award, the university’s highest distinction for a graduating undergraduate. Studin also studied at University of Oxford under a Rhodes Scholarship in 1999, where he completed a Master of Arts degree in Philosophy, Politics, and Economics two years later. He continued his studies at the London School of Economics in 2001 and 2002, focusing on international relations. In 2007, Studin returned to York University to pursue a Doctor of Philosophy degree in constitutional law at Osgoode Hall Law School, which he completed in 2011. For his work, he was awarded the Governor General's Gold Medal.

Studin was the first recruit of the Government of Canada's Recruitment of Policy Leaders Program in 2001–02 and was a member of the team that wrote Canada's first national security policy in 2004. He was the principal author of Australia's 2006 national counter-terrorism policy. Following a career in the Privy Council Office in Ottawa and the Department of the Prime Minister and Cabinet in Canberra, Studin began a career as an educator, editor, and writer. He founded Global Brief magazine in 2009, and co-founded The Institute for 21st Century Questions in 2014.

Previously a professor and program director at the School of Public Policy and Governance, University of Toronto from 2009 until 2014, Studin was a visiting professor at a number of public policy schools in North America, Europe and Asia, including the Lee Kwan Yew School of Public Policy in Singapore, Ukraine's Higher School of Public Administration and Russia's Academy of National Economy and Public Administration. Studin has also served as an associated member of the faculty of Chaire Raoul-Dandurand en études stratégiques et diplomatiques at Université du Québec à Montréal. He was an appointed member of the first advisory board for the Canadian Foreign Service Institute, Canada's diplomatic academy.

Studin has written for publications including the Financial Times, The Daily Telegraph, Le Monde, the Globe & Mail, Toronto Star, Toronto Sun, National Post, Ottawa Citizen, La Presse, Le Devoir, Policy Options, the Montreal Gazette, the Indian Express, Vedomosti, the South China Morning Post, The Australian, the Daily FT (Sri Lanka) and The Straits Times (Singapore).

In February 2020, he announced his intentions of running in the 2020 Conservative Party of Canada leadership election.

In June 2022, Studin participated as a speaker in a retrospective seminar titled A Citizens' Hearing in Toronto, Ontario, evaluating the public health and government response to the COVID-19 pandemic in Canada. He spoke on the impacts on education. For his work on the worldwide crisis of education and youth during and after the COVID-19 pandemic, he was nominated for the 2025 Nobel Peace Prize.

== Playing career ==
Studin played college soccer with the York Lions, where he served as team captain. He was a two-time All-Canadian, three-time All-Ontario all-star, and four-time Academic All-Canadian. His youth soccer career was spent with Armourdale Soccer Club, Woodbridge Soccer Club, North York Hearts, East York, and finally, Spartacus Soccer Club. In 1996, Studin was the MVP of the Under-21 Ontario Soccer League.

In 1997, he played with the Toronto Lynx in the USL A-League, alongside teammates Dwayne De Rosario, Paul Stalteri, and Pat Onstad. He made his debut on May 23, 1997, in a match against the Charleston Battery. In 1998, he signed with Glen Shields S.C. in the newly formed Canadian Professional Soccer League. The following season, he signed with rivals York Region Shooters. He also trained professionally with Oxford United Football Club in the United Kingdom and Hapoel Ashkelon Football Club in Israel. Studin was inducted into the York University Sports Hall of Fame in 2012.

He represented Canada at the 1997 Maccabiah Games and the 1999 Pan-American Maccabi Games.

== Personal life ==
Studin was born in Rome, Italy, to a Russian Jewish family from Odessa, Soviet Union. The family immigrated to Hamilton, Ontario in 1976, when Studin was two months old. He played soccer, hockey, tennis, and the trumpet in his youth. He grew up in North York and Thornhill, Ontario, and attended Aurora High School, graduating as valedictorian. Studin speaks English, French, Russian, and German.

His father, Yuri Studin, founded the Spartacus Soccer Club. Irvin Studin continues to volunteer-coach teams and players at Spartacus Soccer Club when time permits. His mother Sima, is a former Soviet Master of Sport in rhythmic gymnastics.

== Bibliography ==
=== Nonfiction ===
- 2006 – What Is a Canadian?: Forty-Three Thought-Provoking Responses
- 2014 – The Strategic Constitution: Understanding Canadian Power in the World
- 2018 – Russia: Strategy, Policy and Administration
- 2022 – Canada Must Think for Itself: 10 Theses for our Country's Survival & Success in the 21st Century
- 2024 – Never Close the Schools Again. Ever!: How the Pandemic Rise of Third Bucket Kids Changed the Arc of the 21st Century
