= War Measures Act =

Canadian legislation which provided the government emergency powers (1914–88)

Parliament of Canada
- Long title: An act to confer certain powers upon the Governor in Council and to amend the Immigration Act
- Citation: 5 George V, Chap. 2 RSC 1985 c. W-2
- Enacted by: Parliament of Canada
- Assented to: August 22, 1914
- Repealed: July 21, 1988

Repealed by
- Emergencies Act
- Status: Repealed

The War Measures Act (French: Loi sur les mesures de guerre; 5 George V, Chap. 2) was a statute of the Parliament of Canada that provided for the declaration of war, invasion, or insurrection, and the types of emergency measures that could thereby be taken. The Act was brought into force three times in Canadian history: during the First World War, Second World War, and the 1970 October Crisis.

The Act was questioned for its suspension of civil liberties and personal freedoms, including only for Ukrainians and other Europeans during Canada's first national internment operations of 1914–1920, the Second World War's Japanese Canadian internment, and in the October Crisis. In 1988, it was repealed and replaced by the Emergencies Act.

== First World War ==
In the First World War, a state of war with Germany was declared by the United Kingdom on behalf of the entire British Empire. Canada was notified by telegraphic despatch accordingly, effective 4 August 1914, and that status remained in effect until 10 January 1920.

The War Measures Act, 1914, was subsequently adopted on 22 August 1914 to ratify all steps taken by Canada from the declaration of war, to continue until the war was over. Sections 2 to 6 of the original Act in particular provided for the following:

2. All acts and things done or omitted to be done prior to the passing of this Act and on or after the first day of August, A.D. 1914, by or under the authority of or ratified by,-
  - (a) His Majesty the King in Council;
  - (b) any Minister or officer of His Majesty's Imperial Government;
  - (c) the Governor in Council;
  - (d) any Minister or officer of the Government of Canada;
  - (e) any other authority or person;
  which, had they been done or omitted after the passing of this Act, would have been authorized by this Act or by orders or regulations hereunder, shall be deemed to have been done or omitted under the authority of this Act, and are hereby declared to have been lawfully done or omitted.
3. The provisions of sections 6, 10, 11 and 13 of this Act shall only be in force during war, invasion, or insurrection, real or apprehended.
4. The issue of a proclamation by His Majesty, or under the authority of the Governor in Council shall be conclusive evidence that war, invasion, or insurrection, real or apprehended, exists and has existed for any period of time therein stated, and of its continuance, until by the issue of a further proclamation it is declared that the war, invasion or insurrection no longer exists.
5. It is hereby declared that war has continuously existed since the fourth day of August 1914, and shall be deemed to exist until the Governor in Council by proclamation published in The Canada Gazette declares that it no longer exists; but any and all proceedings instituted or commenced by or under the authority of the Governor in Council before the issue of such last mentioned proclamation, the continuance of which he may authorize, may be carried on and concluded as if the said proclamation had not issued.
6. The Governor in Council shall have the power to do and authorize such acts and things, and to make from time to time such orders and regulations, as he may by reason of the existence of real or apprehended war, invasion or insurrection deem necessary or advisable for the security, defence, peace, order and welfare of Canada; and for greater certainty, but not so as to restrict the generality of the foregoing terms, it is hereby declared that the powers of the Governor in Council shall extend to all matters coming within the classes of subjects hereinafter enumerated, that is to say:-
  - (a) censorship and the control and suppression of publications, writings, maps, plans, photographs, communications and means of communication;
  - (b) arrest, detention, exclusion and deportation;
  - (c) control of the harbours, ports and territorial waters of Canada and the movements of vessels;
  - (d) transportation by land, air, or water and the control of the transport of persons and things;
  - (e) trading, exportation, importation, production and manufacture;
  - (f) appropriation, control, forfeiture and disposition of property and of the use thereof.

=== Extent of authority under the Act ===
The Act conferred broad authority, and was even held by the Supreme Court of Canada in In re Gray to include the power to amend other Acts by way of regulation. Noting that the British House of Lords, in R v Halliday, had held in 1917 that the Defence of the Realm Act 1914 possessed similar wide powers with respect to the United Kingdom, Chief Justice of Canada Sir Charles Fitzpatrick declared:

It seems to me obvious that parliament intended, as the language used implies, to clothe the executive with the widest powers in time of danger. Taken literally, the language of the section contains unlimited powers. Parliament expressly enacted that, when need arises, the executive may for the common defence make such orders and regulations as they may deem necessary or advisable for the security, peace, order and welfare of Canada. The enlightened men who framed that section, and the members of parliament who adopted it, were providing for a very great emergency, and they must be understood to have employed words in their natural sense, and to have intended what they have said. There is no doubt, in my opinion, that the regulation in question was passed to provide for the security and welfare of Canada and it is therefore intra vires of the statute under which it purports to be made.

=== Internment during First World War and afterwards ===
Canada's first national internment operations of 1914–1920 involved the internment of both genuine POWs and thousands of civilians. Roughly 8,500 mainly men were interned, of which the largest part were Ukrainians who had come from western Ukrainian lands (Galicia and Northern Bukovina) then held by the Austro-Hungarian Empire. Germans came only second, with about 2,000 men, despite comprising the main population of the Central Powers.

Branded as "enemy aliens", they were stripped of what little wealth they had, forced to work for the profit of their jailers and subjected to other state-sanctioned censures, including disenfranchisement under the Wartime Elections Act. A campaign begun by the Ukrainian Canadian Civil Liberties Association in 1985 aimed at securing official acknowledgement and symbolic restitution for what happened succeeded in 2005, following passage of the Internment of Persons of Ukrainian Origin Recognition Act, which resulted in the establishment of the Canadian First World War Internment Recognition Fund.

With the advent of the Russian Revolution in 1917, additional regulations and orders were added to make the membership in a number of organizations, including socialist and communist organizations, forbidden. Immigration from nations that were connected directly or indirectly with the Austro-Hungarian Empire and Germany was stopped and natives of these countries (Austria, Hungary, Germany and Ukraine) were classed as enemy aliens under the Act. These enemy aliens were required to always carry identification with them and forbidden from possessing firearms, leaving the country without permission, or publishing or reading anything in a language other than English or French. Thousands of these enemy aliens were also interned in camps or deported from Canada. It was not until the labour shortage in Canada became dire that these interned individuals were released into the workforce again in an attempt to boost the economy and the war effort.

== Second World War ==
In contrast to the previous war, by virtue of the Statute of Westminster 1931, Canada instituted its measures separately from the United Kingdom. A state of apprehended war was declared on 25 August 1939, and the Defence of Canada Regulations were implemented under the Act. A state of war was declared with Germany on 10 September 1939.

The extreme security measures permitted by the Defence of Canada Regulations included the waiving of habeas corpus and the right to trial, internment, bans on political and religious groups, restrictions of free speech including the banning of certain publications, and the confiscation of property. S. 21 of the Defence of Canada Regulations allowed the Minister of Justice to detain without charge anyone who might act "in any manner prejudicial to the public safety or the safety of the state." The government soon interned fascists and Communists as well as opponents of conscription. The regulations were later used to intern Japanese Canadians on a large scale as well as some German and Italian Canadians who were viewed as enemy aliens.

In 1940, the more complex nature of organizing the war effort required the National Resources Mobilization Act to be adopted as well, and many subsequent regulations were brought into force by virtue of both of these Acts.

In 1943, the Supreme Court of Canada, in the Chemicals Reference, ruled that Orders in Council made under the Act were equivalent to an Act of Parliament, as Rinfret J observed:

There follows from the principles so enunciated these consequences:

The powers conferred upon the Governor in Council by the War Measures Act constitute a law-making authority, an authority to pass legislative enactments such as should be deemed necessary and advisable by reason of war; and, when acting within those limits, the Governor in Council is vested with plenary powers of legislation as large and of the same nature as those of Parliament itself. Within the ambit of the Act by which his authority is measured, the Governor in Council is given the same authority as is vested in Parliament itself. He has been given a law-making power.

The conditions for the exercise of that power are: The existence of a state of war, or of apprehended war, and that the orders or regulations are deemed advisable or 'necessary by the Governor in Council by reason of such state of war, or apprehended war.

Parliament retains its power intact and can, whenever it pleases, take the matter directly into its own hands. How far it shall seek the aid of subordinate agencies and how long it shall continue them in existence, are matters for Parliament and not for courts of law to decide. Parliament has not abdicated its general legislative powers. It has not effaced itself, as has been suggested. It has indicated no intention of abandoning control and has made no abandonment of control, in fact. The subordinate instrumentality, which it has created for exercising the powers, remains responsible directly to Parliament and depends upon the will of Parliament for the continuance of its official existence.

(Citations omitted.) This authority was cited later in support of decisions taken in the Reference re Persons of Japanese Race.

The Act's effect was further clarified in the Wartime Leasehold Regulations Reference, which held that regulations instituting rental and housing controls displaced provincial jurisdiction for the duration of the emergency. As Taschereau J (as he then was) noted:

Under "Property and Civil Rights", rentals are normally of provincial concern, but as the result of an emergency, the existing provincial laws on the matter become inoperative. The rights of the provinces are not of course permanently suppressed, and their jurisdiction temporarily suspended during the federal invasion, flows afresh when the field is finally abandoned. It is only during the period of occupation that the provincial jurisdiction is overridden. This is the reason that may justify the Dominion Government to offer to some or to all of the provinces to legislate on rentals and to exercise anew their constitutional rights. In order, however, to vest in the Federal Parliament the necessary authority to deal with such matters, there must be an emergency. There is no doubt that such an emergency existed during the war, and that during that period, the jurisdiction of Parliament could not be impugned. But the time that an emergency lasts is not limited to the period of actual hostilities. War is the cause of many social and economic disturbances and its aftermath brings unstable conditions which are settled only after a period of necessary readjustment, during which the emergency may very well persist.

The Act was in force until 31 December 1945, after which the National Emergency Transitional Powers Act, 1945 was in force until 31 March 1947. In 1947, the Continuation of Transitional Measures Act, 1947 was enacted, maintaining certain wartime orders and regulations, and stayed in place until 30 April 1951.

=== Treatment of Japanese Canadians ===
The attack on Pearl Harbor in 1941 led to Canada declaring war against Japan on 8 December 1941. An already established racial bias towards Japanese Canadians was transformed into full anti-Japanese thoughts and behaviour by many Canadian citizens who saw Japanese Canadians as spies for Japan. This fear towards Japanese Canadians led to the quick restriction of their rights and freedoms:

- On 17 December 1941, persons of Japanese descent were required to register with the Royal Canadian Mounted Police.
- On 29 January 1942, a protected area was declared by Government Notice within British Columbia.
- On 24 February, the Defence of Canada Regulations were amended to restrict Japanese Canadians from owning land or growing crops.
- On 26 February, a notice was issued instituting curfews on Japanese Canadians in the protected area of British Columbia, and restricting them from possessing motor vehicles, cameras, radios, firearms, ammunition or explosives.
- On 4 March, regulations under the Act were adopted to forcibly remove Japanese Canadians from the protected area. As a result, 12,000 were interned in interior camps, 2,000 were sent to road camps and another 2,000 were forced to work in the prairies at sugar beet farms.

In December 1945, three Orders in Council were issued to provide for the expulsion of Japanese nationals and other persons of Japanese origin, whether or not they were British subjects (either natural born or naturalized). Although the Supreme Court of Canada gave a mixed ruling on the matter, the Judicial Committee of the Privy Council declared all of them to be valid. Following various protests among politicians and academics, the orders were revoked in 1947.

=== Control of the wartime economy ===
At the beginning of the war, the Wartime Prices and Trade Board was created with a wide mandate to regulate all matters dealing with the necessities of life, rental and housing controls, import and export controls, and wage and price controls. In 1942, its responsibilities were expanded to include the reduction of non-essential industrial activities in order to maintain minimum requirements only for civilian goods.

The Act was also used to create the Wartime Labour Relations Regulations in order to control strikes and lockouts and keep wartime production going. While the regulations were initially restricted to industries under federal jurisdictions and companies directly involved in the war effort, provision was made for the provinces to co-opt into the scheme (which all eventually did).

As labour unrest was widespread at the time, a system of compulsory conciliation was brought into effect, and no strike or lockout could occur until:

- a collective agreement had expired,
- an attempt had been made to negotiate a new agreement,
- compulsory conciliation had been undertaken, and
- fourteen days after the conciliation period had elapsed.

There was, however, frustration on the part of the unions which felt that the government tended to not care about the issues the unions were trying to bring to light. The regulations continued after the war's end until 1948, where they were replaced by similar legislation at both the federal and provincial levels.

== Postwar history ==
In 1960, the Act was amended by the Canadian Bill of Rights, in order to ensure that:

- actions taken under the Act were deemed not to be infringements of the latter statute, and
- proclamations to bring the Act into force were subject to abrogation by both the Senate and the House of Commons.

=== The October Crisis ===
In 1970, members of the Front de libération du Québec (FLQ) kidnapped British diplomat James Cross and Quebec provincial cabinet minister Pierre Laporte, who was later murdered. What is now referred to as the October Crisis raised fears in Canada of a militant faction rising up against the government.

Under provisions of the National Defence Act, the Canadian Armed Forces were deployed to assist the police. They appeared on the streets of Ottawa on 12 October 1970. Upon request of the Quebec government with the unanimous consent of all party leaders in the Quebec National Assembly, troops appeared on the streets of Montreal on 15 October.

At the request of the Mayor of Montreal, Jean Drapeau, and the Quebec provincial government, and in response to general threats and demands made by the FLQ, the federal government declared a state of apprehended insurrection under the War Measures Act on 16 October. This was done so that police had more power in arrest and detention, in order to find and stop the FLQ members.

The use of the Act to address the problem presented by the FLQ was well supported by Canadians in all regions of Canada, according to a December Gallup Poll. However, there were many vocal critics of the government action, including New Democratic Party leader Tommy Douglas, who said, "The government, I submit, is using a sledgehammer to crack a peanut."

While the Act was in force, 465 people were arrested and held without charge but were eventually released.

The response by the federal and provincial governments to the incident still sparks controversy. There was a large amount of concern about the act being used, as it was a considered to be a direct threat to civil liberties, removing rights such as habeas corpus from all Canadians. This is the only time that the Act had been put in place during peacetime in Canada.

Critics, such as Laurier LaPierre, accused Prime Minister Pierre Trudeau's move to suspend habeas corpus as more of a reaction to the separatist movement in Quebec by criminalizing it.

The Act's 1970 regulations were replaced by the Public Order (Temporary Measures) Act in November 1970, which subsequently expired on 30 April 1971.

In October 2020, Bloc Quebecois leader Yves-François Blanchet asked PM Justin Trudeau to apologize for the Canadian Government's invocation of the Act.

=== Replacement ===
In May 1981, the Emergency Planning Order was passed, which assigned responsibilities for planning to meet the exigencies of different types of emergencies to various Ministers, departments and agencies of government.

In 1988, the Emergencies Act was passed, and the War Measures Act was repealed as a consequence.

== See also ==
- Persecution of Jehovah's Witnesses in Canada
