= Jacques Rose =

Québécois nationalis

Jacques Rose (born 1947) is a Québécois nationalist who was a member of the Chénier Cell of the Front de libération du Québec (FLQ), along with his brother Paul Rose, who led the cell.

The Chénier cell of the FLQ kidnapped Quebec Labour Minister Pierre Laporte in October 1970, as part of events that came to be known as the October Crisis. Laporte's strangled body was found in the trunk of a car on October 17.

Jacques Rose was convicted in 1973 of being an accessory after the fact before being released on parole in 1978. Rose remained politically active after his release, running twice as a provincial candidate and actively campaigning with his brother Paul for the pro-independence "Yes" side in the 1995 Quebec referendum, before eventually retiring from his job as a carpenter.

== Sources ==
- Fournier, Louis (1998). FLQ Histoire d'un mouvement clandestin (in French). Montréal: Lanctôt éditeur. ISBN 978-2-89485-073-2.
- Leroux, Manon (2002). Les Silences d'octobre : le discours des acteurs de la crise de 1970 (in French). VLB éditeur. ISBN 978-2-89005-810-1.
