= Saint-Luc, Quebec =

Coordinates: 45°21′41.2″N 73°18′18.6″W

Saint-Luc (French pronunciation: [sɛ̃ lyk]) was a town in southwestern Quebec, Canada on the Richelieu River.

In December 1970, the final members of the Front de libération du Québec who were arrested for their roles in the October Crisis were arrested here.

On January 24, 2001, the towns of Saint-Luc, Saint-Athanase, Iberville, and L'Acadie merged into the city of Saint-Jean-sur-Richelieu.

Saint-Luc was located in Le Haut-Richelieu Regional County Municipality. Population: (2001) 20,573.

== Education ==
The Honore-Mercier School Commission, South Shore Protestant Regional School Board and the Chambly Catholic School Board previously served the municipality.
