= Paul Rose (political figure) =

Canadian terrorist (1943–2013)

- Rose speaking in Montreal on 15 December 1988
- Born: 16 October 1943; Montreal, Quebec, Canada
- Died: 14 March 2013 (aged 69); Montreal, Quebec, Canada
- Children: Félix Rose
- Status: Paroled
- Allegiance: Front de libération du Québec
- Convictions: Kidnapping and murder
- Criminal charges: Kidnapping and murder
- Penalty: Life imprisonment [Liberated under conditions in december 1982]

Paul Rose (16 October 1943 – 14 March 2013) was a Canadian Quebec nationalist, a lecturer at Université du Québec à Montréal, and a convicted murderer and terrorist known for his role in the October Crisis. He was convicted of the kidnapping and murder by strangulation of Quebec Deputy Premier Pierre Laporte in 1970. A Quebec government commission later determined in 1980 that Rose was not present when Laporte was killed, despite a recorded confession. He was the leader of the Chenier cell of the Front de libération du Québec (FLQ), an armed group which was fighting what they considered the oppression of French Quebecers.

On 10 October 1970, the cell kidnapped Quebec Deputy Premier Pierre Laporte. Laporte's strangled body was found in the trunk of a car on 17 October. Rose was among those convicted of the kidnapping and murder.

== Biography ==
Rose was born in the Saint-Henri district of Montreal. At the age of eight, his family moved to Ville-Emard and later on his family moved to Ville Jacques-Cartier, now part of Longueuil, where he spent most of his teenage years.

A member of the Rassemblement pour l'indépendance nationale political party, Rose's involvement with radical groups began in 1968 after meeting Jacques Lanctôt, a member of the FLQ, during a rally against Canadian Prime Minister Pierre Elliott Trudeau at the Saint-Jean-Baptiste parade.

== Role in October Crisis ==
During what became known as the October Crisis, on 5 October 1970, members of the FLQ's Liberation Cell kidnapped the British Trade Commissioner James Cross from his Montreal home as part of a violent attempt to overthrow the elected government and to establish a socialist Quebec state independent of Canada. On 10 October, Paul Rose as leader of the FLQ's Chénier Cell joined with members Jacques Rose (brother), Bernard Lortie, and Francis Simard to kidnap Quebec Vice Premier and cabinet minister, Pierre Laporte. Believing many others would follow in an uprising, their goal was to have Quebec live up to the fate wished for it by the Lower Canada rebellions of 1837–8, namely to become an independent country. However, the kidnapping did not work out as planned and they killed Laporte. Some say that FLQ killed him without hesitation in order to show to the population they were serious. In 1971, Rose was convicted of the kidnapping and murder of Laporte and sentenced to life imprisonment.

In 1980, the Duchaine Report found that Rose was not present when Laporte was killed. He was released on parole in 1982.

Later evidence would prove the contrary. "A coroner's inquest soon after the murder determined that Laporte had been strangled by a gold religious medal he wore around his neck. In a conversation wiretapped by police, Rose even admitted to his lawyer that he “finished” Laporte with the gold chain." However, the police officer who recorded the conversation told The Globe and Mail that Rose may have made the statement to cover up for another cell member. Another version, less "drastic", says rather that this secretly recorded conversation was between Paul Rose's brother, Jacques, and his lawyer, Robert Lemieux. Jacques Rose then told that Pierre Laporte was accidentally strangled during a struggle after he tried to escape while two of the kidnappers were about to release him. As this conversation was recorded without the consent of Rose and Lemieux, it could not be used as evidence.

Rose also remained unrepentant. In an interview he gave to Le Devoir, he said:

I regret nothing: 1970, the abductions, the prison, the suffering, nothing. I did what I had to do. Placed before the same circumstances today, I would do exactly the same thing. I will never deny what I did and what happened. It was not a youthful indiscretion.

== Later life and death ==
During the 1990s, he contributed to the monthly L'aut'journal. He was nominated as the New Democratic Party of Quebec's candidate in a 1992 provincial by-election. His nomination was controversial, and resulted in the federal New Democratic Party denouncing its former provincial wing (ties between the two parties had been severed in 1989) and seeking legal options in an attempt to force the provincial party to change its name.

The NDPQ changed its name to the Parti de la démocratie socialiste in 1994, and Rose was elected its leader in 1996. He led the party until 2002 when it joined the Union des forces progressistes. Rose worked for the Confédération des syndicats nationaux labour union. Rose remained a strong supporter of the Quebec sovereignty movement, which he likened to "a liberation nationalism. It's a people being denied its existence that is trying to find its place in the sun, in the same way as Palestine and Ireland."

He died of a stroke on 14 March 2013, at the Hôpital du Sacré-Cœur de Montréal at the age of 69.

Even in death, Rose was the source of controversy. Amir Khadir, one of two deputies of the sovereigntist party Quebec solidaire, which had absorbed the UFP in 2006, proposed tabling a motion in the Quebec provincial legislature to honour his death. Khadir later withdrew the proposal, blaming anglophone media for nationalist hate-mongering, and claiming Rose had recanted and been rehabilitated.

His son Félix Rose released the documentary film The Rose Family (Les Rose), about his own efforts to come to terms with being the son of a convicted murderer, in 2020.
