= Pierre Laporte =

Canadian politician (1921–1970)

- Laporte in 1968

Deputy Premier of Quebec
- In office May 12 – October 17, 1970
- Premier: Robert Bourassa
- Preceded by: Jean-Guy Cardinal
- Succeeded by: Gérard D. Levesque (1972)

Minister of Immigration of Quebec
- In office May 12 – October 17, 1970
- Premier: Robert Bourassa
- Preceded by: Mario Beaulieu
- Succeeded by: François Cloutier

Minister of Cultural Affairs of Quebec
- In office September 9, 1964 – June 16, 1966
- Premier: Jean Lesage
- Preceded by: Georges-Émile Lapalme
- Succeeded by: Jean-Noël Tremblay

Minister of Municipal Affairs of Quebec
- In office December 5, 1962 – June 16, 1966
- Premier: Jean Lesage
- Preceded by: Lucien Cliche
- Succeeded by: Paul Dozois
Parliamentary constituencies
Member of the National Assembly for Chambly
In office December 14, 1961 – October 17, 1970
Preceded by	Robert Théberge
Succeeded by	Jean Cournoyer (1971)

Personal details
- Born: 25 February 1921 Montreal, Quebec, Canada
- Died: 17 October 1970 (aged 49) Longueuil, Quebec, Canada
- Cause of death: Murder by strangulation
- Resting place: Notre Dame des Neiges Cemetery
- Party: Quebec Liberal
- Spouse: Françoise Brouillet

Pierre Laporte (French pronunciation: [pjɛʁ lapɔʁt]; 25 February 1921 – 17 October 1970) was a Canadian lawyer, journalist and politician. He was deputy premier of the province of Quebec when he was kidnapped and murdered by members of the Front de libération du Québec (FLQ) during the October Crisis.

== Life and career ==
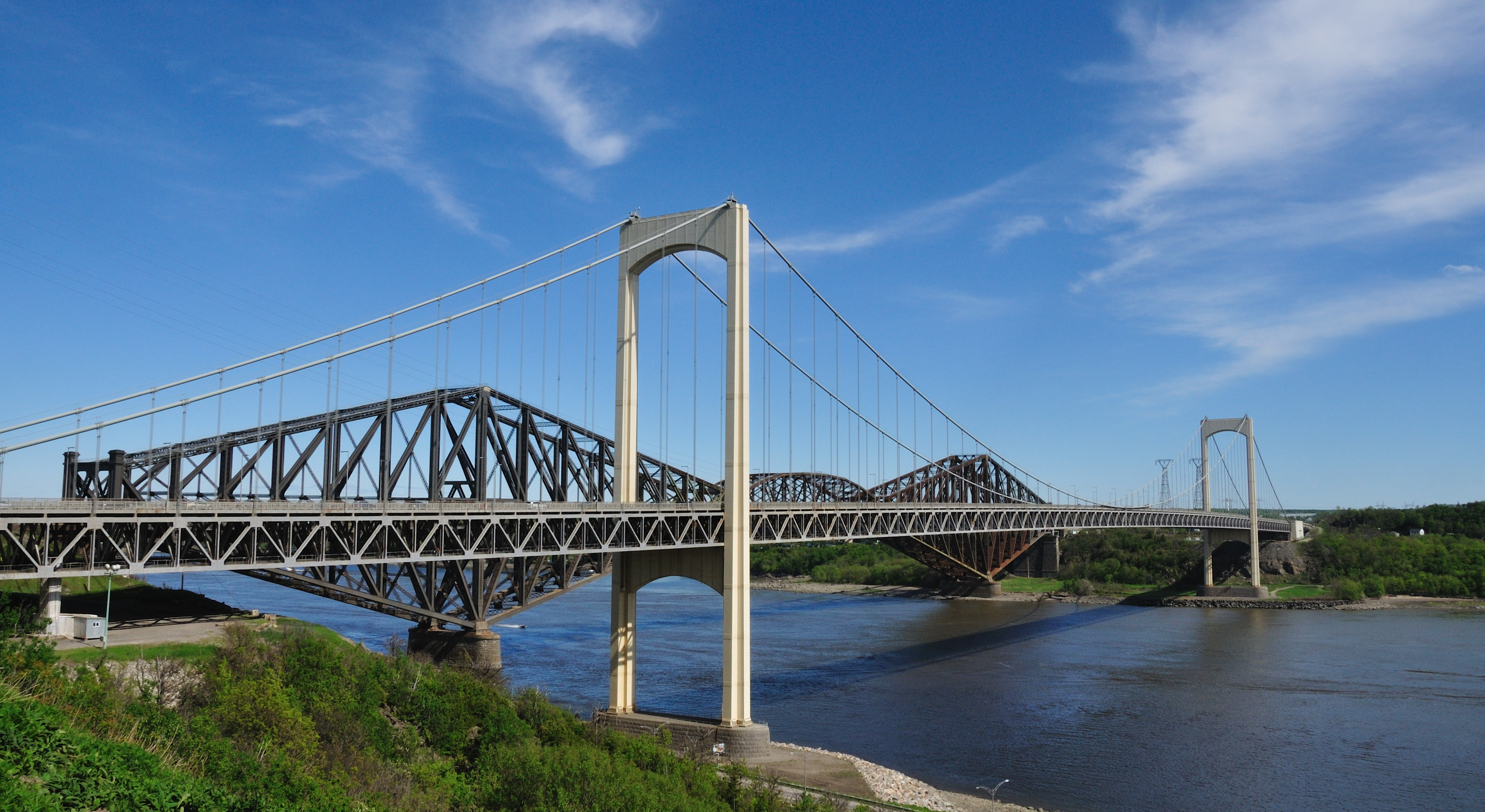
Pierre Laporte Bridge

Pierre Laporte, grandson of the Liberal politician Alfred Leduc, was born in Montreal, Quebec, on 25 February 1921. He was a journalist with Le Devoir newspaper from 1945 to 1961, and was known for his crusading work against Quebec's then-Premier Maurice Duplessis. In 1950, he graduated from the Law School at the Université de Montreal, and was hired by Le Devoir shortly afterwards.

During his years in journalism, he published a number of series targeting the management of the Duplessis government. At the same time that he criticized the Union Nationale government in public, he wrote campaign pamphlets for the Union Nationale during elections. In 1954, Le Devoir ran a six-part series on problems during the construction of the Bersimis-1 generating station. Laporte alleged that the government had taken kickbacks from construction companies building the dam. In a speech, Duplessis called Laporte "a man without a heart, a pig, a snake and a slothy individual" whose journalism "pandered to the vilest instincts of yellow journalism and the most ignoble sentiments". Duplessis referred to Laporte as a writer for a "Bolshevik journal". In 1954, Laporte published a column in the left-wing newspaper Vrai where he wrote: "The Union Nationale is rotten. Those who don’t have eyes to see clearly...at least have a nose to smell. It’s a rotten fruit, whose stink wafts all the way to the provincial borders." In 1958, he was part of a team of Le Devoir reporters exposing the natural gas scandal, leading to the formation of the Salvas Commission, soon after the election of 1960. Laporte's biographer, Jean-Charles Panneton, stated:

Pierre Laporte was very courageous. He was a pioneer of investigative journalism in an era when investigative journalism was not practiced, when the media were very docile toward the government of Maurice Duplessis.

Laporte was very close to his wife, Françoise, whom he adored. One who knew him stated:

Pierre was the type of guy who went fishing with his wife. When he went travelling, he would always think how he could take his wife. He wouldn't go to a stag party. And he would introduce his wife with eyes that big — the way [a] young fellow would introduce his girl to relatives.

Peter Edwards, the crime correspondent of The Toronto Star, wrote in 1990 that Laporte was a "devoted family man".

After Duplessis's death, Laporte successfully ran for the Parti libéral du Québec for a seat in Chambly in the Quebec National Assembly and served in the government of Premier Jean Lesage. Laporte was a member of the Quebec Liberal Party, and considered to be a leading member of the party's left wing. Laporte was elected in a by-election in 1961. Laporte served as minister of municipal affairs from 1962 to 1966. In 1962, he was involved in a scandal which it emerged that he lobbied successfully for the Quebec government to rent construction equipment from a firm he owned, leading to charges of conflict of interest violations. Several Québécois newspapers printed cartoons that mockingly showed Laporte leading hundreds of bulldozers and tractors into Quebec City for the government to rent. In 1962, Laporte was the leading force behind a bill passed in the National Assembly that disqualified from holding office, J. Aldéo Léo Rémillard, the Union Nationale mayor of Ville Jacques-Cartier, on the account of his criminal record. Laporte also served as minister of cultural affairs from 1964 to 1966. In 1965, Laporte introduced the bill that led to the merger of several municipalities that created the city of Laval.

Laporte took a populist line, presenting himself as the defender of the "little guy". In a speech, Laporte warned that the Liberals must look after the interests of the "average men" as he stated: "Otherwise, the masses, like those of France in 1789 or Germany in 1933, will be swept away in an undoubtedly unacceptable excess, one that has been sown by our faults and our omissions". He was frequently accused of accepting kickbacks during his time in office with his nickname being "Monsieur Dix Pour Cent" ("Mister Ten Percent"). In the 1966 Quebec general election, the Parti libéral du Québec government of Lesage was defeated by the Union Nationale, and Laporte sat on the opposition benches for the next four years. The Union Nationale premier Daniel Johnson Sr. called Laporte "le roi des patroneux" ("king of the porkbarrel"). After Lesage announced in 1969 that he would step down as party leader, Laporte ran to succeed him, but lost the 1970 Quebec Liberal Party leadership election to fellow cabinet member Robert Bourassa.

Laporte, and several other provincial politicians, received campaign contributions from gangster Frank D'Asti, a capo of the Cotroni family, though there evidence that Laporte had any involvement in crimial activities. Laporte's two principal aides, René Gagnon and Jacques Côté, met with D'Asti and another Cotroni family capo, Nicolo Di Iorio, to pick up briefcases full of cash during both Laporte's 1969 leadership bid and again in the 1970 provincial election, which was won by the Liberals. On 16 April 1970, a Royal Canadian Mounted Police (RCMP) surveillance team observed Laporte, Gagnon, and Côté meeting with D'Asti and Di Iorio in an apartment in Montreal. The RCMP surveillance team's report stated that Di Iorio, D'Asti, and Côté together entered Gagnon's apartment and were subsequently joined by Laporte at about "1740 hours"; Laporte later left at about "1850 hours". Gagnon and Côté later stated the meeting was called by D'Asti and Di Iorio who wanted to warn Laporte about allegations of electoral fraud in the Montreal area. According to Gagnon, the meeting ended with Laporte asking the two Mafiosi to "please keep Monsieur Côté informed of the developments in this affair".

On 3 May 1970, in a room that was wiretapped by the police, D'Asti talked with Di Iorio, Angelo Lanzo and Romeo Bucci about their hopes that Laporte would be appointed Attorney-General of Quebec. A Royal Canadian Mounted Police summary dated 17 September 1970 stated:

They [D'Asti and Di Iorio] foresaw that they would be able to get favors from Laporte [...] They were very hopeful that Laporte would be appointed justice minister. At that time, René Gagnon and Jacques Côté were working hard to assure them that prospects were good and this would come about. Their aim was to obtain financial contributions for the campaign [...] They were very disappointed when Laporte was named minister of labour and immigration instead of minister of justice. However, they have been assured since then, mainly by Côté, that they would have no problems with Justice Minister Jerôme Choquette.

The situation with Laporte was considered highly sensitive by the authorities in Ottawa who made it clear that they did not want the Mounties investigating Laporte.

After the Quebec general election in 1970, Premier Bourassa advised the Lieutenant Governor to appoint Laporte as Deputy Premier, Parliamentary Leader, Minister of Immigration, and Minister of Labour and Manpower.

== Kidnapping and murder ==
On 5 October 1970, James Cross, the British trade commissioner in Montreal, was kidnapped by the FLQ. Laporte called the Cross kidnapping "a wind of madness temporarily blowing across Canada". Five days later, on 10 October 1970, Laporte was kidnapped from his home on Robitaille Street in Saint-Lambert, Quebec, by the Chénier Cell of the FLQ. The kidnappers – Paul and Jacques Rose, Francis Simard, and Bernard Lortie – approached Laporte while he was playing football with his nephew Claude on his front lawn and forced him into their vehicle at gunpoint. Laporte was chosen partly because of his links to the Cotroni crime family (which would embarrass the Bourassa government) and partly because he had no bodyguards, which made him an easy man to kidnap. Laporte was heading towards the street to pick up the football when he was confronted with a masked man who had just gotten out of a car parked in front of his house who pointed a submachine gun at his face. The FLQ dubbed him the "Minister of Unemployment and Assimilation," and held him hostage, demanding the release of 23 "political prisoners" in exchange for his freedom.

It was the intention of the FLQ to have Laporte write out a "confession" detailing his links to the Cotroni family which the FLQ hoped would be the "Magna Carta of corruption" in Quebec. Laporte was defiant, telling his captors: "It will all work out. I know it. Don't worry. It will all work out perfectly". Laporte was held in a house at 5630 Armstrong (now Bachand) street in Longueuil. Prime Minister Pierre Trudeau invoked Canada's War Measures Act which allowed mass raids and arrests to take place in order to find the group who had kidnapped Laporte and Cross. Trudeau said:

Nothing that either the Government of Canada or the Government of Quebec has done or failed to do, now or in the future, could possibly excuse any injury to either of these two innocent men. The gun pointed at their heads have FLQ fingers on the trigger. Should any injury result, there is no explanation that could condone the act. Should there be harm done to these men, the Government promises unceasing pursuit of those responsible.

Laporte was handcuffed, chained to the floor and blindfolded. However, by feeling his way around his room and pressing his face across the wall, he was able to discover a window. On the afternoon of 16 October 1970, Laporte heard a police siren in the distance, and decided to escape by throwing himself through the window. He broke through the window, but his leg chains left him dangling in the air. The broken glass severed the arteries on his left wrist, right thumb and in his chest. As he dangled in the air, Laporte screamed "Aider! Aider! Quelqu'un s'il vous plaît aidez-moi!" ("Help! Help! Somebody please help me!"), but nobody other than his captors heard his cries. His captors pulled him back in. The police siren that Laporte heard was due to a report of a fire at a house further down Armstrong street. Over the course of the night, Laporte was bleeding badly from his severed arteries and it was apparent that he would die soon if he did not receive prompt medical attention. Simard described him as being like a "zombie", saying:

He didn't move. No reaction, We took off his blindfold. He didn't even look at us. It was like Laporte was already dead. He was like somebody stripped of all life. He looked totally empty. You could feel that he'd already received the death blow.

As he was laid out on the floor, Laporte seemed resigned to his death as he grew weaker and he refused to speak. On the morning of 17 October, his captors decided to strangle him to death rather than release him to a hospital. Two men held him in place while a third wrapped the leg chain around his neck. Laporte did not put up a struggle and after a few minutes, Laporte was dead.

On 17 October, seven days after he went missing, Laporte's body was found in the trunk of a car at Montreal Saint-Hubert Longueuil Airport. On the same day, D'Asti and Di Iorio met with Gagnon with an offer of help as the duo stated that their boss, Vic Cotroni, had given orders for the Cotroni family to find Laporte. Gagnon later stated he was told by D'Asti and Di Iorio: "René, we can find him. We know where he is". Just minutes after accepting the offer of help from the Cotroni family, Gagnon heard the news on the radio of Laporte's murder. Laporte was buried in the Cimetière Notre-Dame-des-Neiges on 20 October 1970 in a funeral attended by the elites of both Ottawa and Quebec City in Montreal, Quebec.

The Chénier cell were all arrested by the Sûreté du Québec on 28 December 1970 at a farmhouse south of Montreal. The members of the Chénier Cell served terms ranging from 20 years to life, though they were all released on parole much earlier. On 4 January 1971, Simard while in police custody wrote up an unsigned statement that stated that he and the two Rose brothers were the three men who killed Laporte.

In 1977, a book, L'exécution de Pierre Laporte by the Quebec separatist journalist Pierre Vallières, was published. In his book, Valliėres advanced an elaborate conspiracy theory that the Canadian Army, the Royal Canadian Mounted Police and the Cotroni family had conspired to have Laporte murdered and then blamed the killing on the FLQ as part of a plot to discredit Quebec separatism. Vallières's theory was decisively debunked in 1982 when a book co-written jointly by Simard, the two Rose brothers, and Lortie, Pour en finir avec octobre, was published. The four authors of Pour en finir avec octobre stated quite explicitly that they were all collectively responsible for Laporte's murder, though the authors refused to say who actually strangled Laporte to death with his leg chains. The four co-authors stated in Pour en finir avec octobre that:

Pierre Laporte was murdered. His death was not accidental. Without entering into the details, we have always taken responsibility for the death of Pierre Laporte. From our arrest and the trials that followed, we confirmed our complete responsibility, without limitation.

However, the four co-authors of Pour en finir avec octobre expressed no remorse for Laporte's murder and made no apologies to his family. The members of the Chénier cell dismissed Vallières's book as they wrote:

For amateurs of mystery novels, there are idiocies, downright dishonest of the kind found in L'exécution de Pierre Laporte by Pierre Vallières. It is the theory of infiltration, of the enemy coming from the inside.

A report into Laporte's murder by Justice Duchaine in 1980 concluded that at very least Jacques Rose and Francis Simard were both present when Laporte was killed, though the report did not name the man who strangled Laporte.

In 2010, journalist Guy Gendron produced a documentary series for Radio-Canada, in which he asserted that the killing of Pierre Laporte was unintentional – "Il a été étouffé dans un moment de panique" ("He was choked in a moment of panic"). The journalist Dan MacPherson of the Montreal Gazette described Gendron's documentary – which depicted Laporte's murder as more or less an accident – as part of a tendency by Quebec separatists to whitewash the FLQ.

== Monument to Laporte ==
On the 40th anniversary of his death, 17 October 2010, a monument to Laporte was unveiled by then-Premier of Quebec, Jean Charest. It stands at the St. Lawrence Seaway Park, near Laporte's home on Robitaille Street. On the monument is inscribed: "Nul ne vit pour soi-même. Nul ne meurt pour soi-même" ("No one lives for oneself. No one dies for oneself").

A middle school in Toronto is named after Laporte.

== See also ==
- List of kidnappings
- List of solved missing person cases: 1950–1999

== Books ==
- Anastakis, Dimitry (2015). Death in the Peaceable Kingdom Canadian History Since 1867 Through Murder, Execution, Assassination, and Suicide. Toronto: University of Toronto Press. ISBN 9781442606364.
- Edwards, Peter (1990). Blood Brothers: How Canada's Most Powerful Mafia Family Runs Its Business. Toronto: Key Porter Books. ISBN 155013213X.
- Schneider, Stephen (2009). Iced: The Story of Organized Crime in Canada. Toronto: John Wiley & Sons. ISBN 978-0470835005.
- Tetley, William (2006). The October Crisis, 1970: An Insider's View. Montreal: McGill University Press. ISBN 9780773576605.

National Assembly of Quebec
Preceded by Lucien Cliche (Liberal)	Minister of Municipal Affairs; 1962–1966	Succeeded by Paul Dozois (Union Nationale)
Preceded by Jean Cournoyer (Union Nationale)	Minister of Labour; 1970–1970	Succeeded by Jean Cournoyer (Liberal)
Preceded by n.a.	Government House Leader; 1965–1966	Succeeded by Maurice Bellemare (Union Nationale)
Preceded by n.a.	Official Opposition House Leader; 1966–1970	Succeeded by Rémi Paul (Union Nationale)
