= 1999 Toronto International Film Festival =

Annual Canadian film festival

- Festival poster
- Opening film: Felicia's Journey
- Closing film: Onegin
- Location: Toronto, Ontario, Canada
- Hosted by: Toronto International Film Festival Group
- No. of films: 318 films
- Festival date: September 9, 1999–September 18, 1999
- Language: English
- Website: tiff.net
- 2000 1998

The 24th Toronto International Film Festival ran from September 9 to September 18, 1999. The festival opened with Atom Egoyan's Felicia's Journey and closed with Onegin by Martha Fiennes. A total of 318 films were screened in the 13 programmes.

== Awards ==
Award	Film	Recipient
People's Choice Award	American Beauty	Sam Mendes
Discovery Award	Goat on Fire and Smiling Fish	Kevin Jordan
Best Canadian Feature Film	The Five Senses	Jeremy Podeswa
Best Canadian Feature Film – Special Jury Citation	Set Me Free (Emporte-moi)	Léa Pool
Best Canadian First Feature Film	Just Watch Me: Trudeau and the '70s Generation	Catherine Annau
Best Canadian First Feature Film – Special Jury Citation	Full Blast	Rodrigue Jean
Canadian Film Jury Special Citations for Acting	Johnny	Chris Martin
Canadian Film Jury Special Citations for Acting	New Waterford Girl	Liane Balaban
Canadian Film Jury Special Citations for Acting	Set Me Free (Emporte-moi)	Karine Vanasse
Best Canadian Short Film	Discharge (Décharge)	Patrick Demers
Best Canadian Short Film – Special Mention	Karaoke	Stéphane Lafleur
FIPRESCI International Critics' Award	Shower	Zhang Yang

== Programme ==
=== Gala Opening Night ===
- Felicia's Journey by Atom Egoyan

=== Gala Closing Night ===
- Onegin by Martha Fiennes

=== Gala Presentations ===
- American Beauty by Sam Mendes
- Anywhere But Here by Wayne Wang
- The Cider House Rules by Lasse Hallstrom
- Est-ouest by Regis Wargnier
- Jakob the Liar by Peter Kassovitz
- Love in the Mirror (Amor nello specchio) by Salvatore Maira
- Me Myself I by Pip Karmel
- Mumford by Lawrence Kasdan
- Music of the Heart by Wes Craven
- La niña de tus ojos by Fernando Trueba
- Orfeu by Carlos Diegues
- Ride with the Devil by Ang Lee
- Simpatico by Matthew Warchus
- Snow Falling on Cedars by Scott Hicks
- Sunshine by István Szabó
- Sweet and Lowdown by Woody Allen

=== Special Presentations ===
- Children of the Century by Diane Kurys
- All the Rage by James D. Stern
- Annaluise & Anton by Caroline Link
- The Best Man by Malcolm D. Lee
- The Big Kahuna by John Swanbeck
- Black and White by James Toback
- Breakfast of Champions by Alan Rudolph
- Dogma by Kevin Smith
- Forever Mine by Paul Schrader
- Ghost Dog: The Way of the Samurai by Jim Jarmusch
- Grass by Ron Mann
- Gregory's Two Girls by Bill Forsyth
- History is Made at Night by Ilkka Jarvilaturi
- The Hurricane by Norman Jewison
- Joe the King by Frank Whaley
- Une liaison pornographique by Frederic Fonteyne
- The Limey by Steven Soderbergh
- The Luck of Ginger Coffey by Irvin Kershner
- Mansfield Park by Patricia Rozema
- A Map of the World by Scott Elliott
- Mr. Death: The Rise and Fall of Fred A. Leuchter, Jr. by Errol Morris
- Pas de scandale by Benoît Jacquot
- Princess Mononoke by Hayao Miyazaki
- The Third Miracle by Agnieszka Holland
- To Walk with Lions by Carl Schultz
- Tumbleweeds by Gavin O'Connor
- Wayward Son by Randall Harris
- Women Talking Dirty by Coky Giedroyc
- Wonderland by Michael Winterbottom

=== Masters ===
- 8½ Women by Peter Greenaway
- L'Autre by Youssef Chahine
- The Emperor and the Assassin by Chen Kaige
- Goya in Bordeaux by Carlos Saura
- Juha by Aki Kaurismäki
- Kikujiro by Takeshi Kitano
- The Legend of 1900 by Giuseppe Tornatore
- La lettre by Manoel de Oliveira
- Moloch by Alexandr Sokurov
- Molokai: The Story of Father Damien by Paul Cox
- No One Writes to the Colonel by Arturo Ripstein
- The Wet-Nurse by Marco Bellocchio
- The Wind Will Carry Us by Abbas Kiarostami

=== Perspective Canada ===
- Babette's Feet by Harry Killas
- Below the Belt by Laurie Colbert and Dominique Cardona
- The Big Snake of the World (Le Grand serpent du monde) by Yves Dion
- By This Parting by Mieko Ouchi
- La Casa del Nonno by Lisa Sfriso
- Discharge (Décharge) by Patrick Demers
- Don't Think Twice by Sarah Polley
- Dreamtrips by Kal Ng
- Ecstasy by Mark Wihak
- Eva Meets Felix by Heidi B. Gerber
- Exhuming Tyler by Merlin Dervisevic
- Fit by David Christensen
- The Five Senses by Jeremy Podeswa
- Fly by Jigar Talati
- Four Days by Curtis Wehrfritz
- Fries with That by Christopher McKay
- Frog Pond by Bradley Walsh
- Full Blast by Rodrigue Jean
- A Girl is a Girl by Reginald Harkema
- Here am I by Joshua Dorsey and Douglas Naimer
- Hi, I'm Steve by Robert Kennedy
- Je te salue by Hugo Brochu
- Johnny by Carl Bessai
- Just Watch Me: Trudeau and the 70's Generation by Catherine Annau
- Karaoke by Stéphane Lafleur
- Kokoro is for Heart by Philip Hoffman
- The Life Before This by Jerry Ciccoritti
- The Long Winter (Quand je serai parti... vous vivrez encore) by Michel Brault
- Memories Unlocked (Souvenirs intimes) by Jean Beaudin
- Mothers of Me by Alexandra Grimanis
- My Father's Angel by Davor Marjanovic
- My Father's Hands by David Sutherland
- New Waterford Girl by Allan Moyle
- The Offering by Paul Lee
- Pamplemousse by Tink
- Quiver by Scott Beveridge
- Remembrance Dance by Chris Gilpin
- Rollercoaster by Scott Smith
- Sea Song by Richard Reeves
- Second Date by James Genn
- Set Me Free (Emporte-moi) by Léa Pool
- So Beautiful by Jacob Wren
- Soul Cages by Phillip Barker
- Sparklehorse by Gariné Torossian
- Subterranean Passage by Michael Crochetière
- Switch by Hope Thompson
- Top of the Food Chain by John Paizs
- Tops & Bottoms: Sex, Power and Sadomasochism by Cristine Richey
- Touched by Mort Ransen
- Toy Soldiers by Jackie May
- Tuba Girl by Michèle Muzzi
- Undertow by Sarah Bachinski
- Wedding Knives by Johanna Mercer
- When the Day Breaks by Wendy Tilby and Amanda Forbis
- Where Lies the Homo? by Jean-François Monette
- Zyklon Portrait by Elida Schogt

=== Contemporary World Cinema ===
- 1999 Madeleine by Laurent Bouhnik
- Adrenaline Drive by Shinobu Yaguchi
- After the Truth by Roland Suso Richter
- Criminal Lovers by François Ozon
- Andares in Time of War by Alejandra Jimenez Lopez
- The Annihilation of Fish by Charles Burnett
- Augustin, roi du Kung-fu by Anne Fontaine
- Away with Words by Christopher Doyle
- Beau travail by Claire Denis
- Beautiful People by Jasmin Dizdar
- The Big Brass Ring by George Hickenlooper
- Le bleu des villes by Stephane Brize
- Boys Don't Cry by Kimberly Peirce
- Buddy Boy by Mark Hanlon
- Bullets Over Summer by Wilson Yip
- Burlesk King by Mel Chionglo
- C'est quoi la vie? by François Dupeyron
- Caravan by Eric Valli
- The Color of Heaven by Majid Majidi
- Les convoyeurs attendent by Benoit Mariage
- Crane World by Pablo Trapero
- The Cup by Khyentse Norbu
- Dancing with Hydra by Takuji Suzuki
- Darkness and Light by Chang Tso-chi
- Un derangement considerable by Bernard Stora
- Deterrence by Rod Lurie
- East is East by Damien O'Donnell
- Enthusiasm by Ricardo Larrain
- Feeling Sexy by Davida Allen
- From the Edge of the City by Constantinos Giannaris
- Garage Olimpo by Marco Bechis
- Gemini by Shinya Tsukamoto
- Guinevere by Audrey Wells
- Hans Warns – My 20th Century by Gordian Maugg
- Happy, Texas by Mark Illsley
- Harem Suare by Ferzan Özpetek
- High Expectations by Evi Quaid
- L'humanite by Bruno Dumont
- Jesus' Son by Alison Maclean
- Journey to the Sun by Yeşim Ustaoğlu
- Judy Berlin by Eric Mendelsohn
- julien donkey-boy by Harmony Korine
- Kadosh by Amos Gitaï
- The Last September by Deborah Warner
- Lies by Jang Sun-woo
- Luna Papa by Bakhityar Khudojnazarov
- M/Other by Nobuhiro Suwa
- Malli by Santosh Sivan
- The Man-Eater by Aurelio Grimaldi
- March of Happiness by Lin Cheng-Sheng
- Mifune – Dogme 3 by Søren Kragh-Jacobsen
- Miss Julie by Mike Figgis
- Nightfall by Fred Kelemen
- One Piece! by Shinobu Yaguchi and Takuji Suzuki
- Peau neuve by Emilie Deleuze
- The Personals by Chen Kuo-fu
- Le petit voleur by Eric Zonca
- Ratcatcher by Lynne Ramsay
- Revenge by Andrés Wood
- Rien a faire by Marion Vernoux
- Romance by Catherine Breillat
- A Room for Romeo Brass by Shane Meadows
- Rosetta by Luc Dardenne and Jean-Pierre Dardenne
- Show Me Love by Lukas Moodysson
- Shower by Zhang Yang
- Simon, The Magician by Ildiko Enyedi
- So Close to Paradise by Wang Xiaoshuai
- Soft Hearts by Joel Lamangan and Eric Quizon
- Speedy Boys by James Herbert
- Splendor by Gregg Araki
- Split Wide Open by Dev Benegal
- Sunburn by Nelson Hume
- Tempting Heart by Sylvia Chang
- Throne of Death by Murali Nair
- Time Out by Sergio Cabrera
- A Time to Love by Giacomo Campiotti
- Two Streams by Carlos Reichenbach
- Urban Feel by Jonathan Sagall
- The Virgin by Diego Donnhofer
- The War Zone by Tim Roth
- Yesterday Children by Carlos Siguion-Reyna

=== Discovery ===
- 30 Days by Aaron Harnick
- Bloody Angels by Karin Julsrud
- But Forever in My Mind by Gabriele Muccino
- But I'm a Cheerleader by Jamie Babbit
- Civilisees by Randa Chahal
- The Criminal of Barrio Concepcion by Lav Diaz
- Envy by Julie Money
- Freak Weather by Mary Kuryla
- Girls' Night Out by Im Sang-soo
- A Glass of Rage by Aluízio Abranches
- Goat on Fire and Smiling Fish by Kevin Jordan
- Guts by Ron Termaat
- Hidden River by Mercedes García Guevara
- Human Traffic by Justin Kerrigan
- I Could Read the Sky by Nichola Bruce
- Idle Running by Janez Burger
- Janice Beard: 45 WPM by Clare Kilner
- The Joys of Smoking by Nick Katsapetses
- The Junction by Urszula Urbaniak
- Just One Time by Lane Janger
- Kill by Inches by Diane Doniol-Valcroze and Arthur Flam
- Moonlight Whispers by Akihiko Shiota
- Mr. I and Mrs. O by Valentina Leduc
- Northern Skirts by Barbara Albert
- Pictures and Butterfly by Yanko Del Pino
- Return of the Idiot by Saša Gedeon
- Rodents by Sebastián Cordero
- Shadows in the Dark by Pankaj Butalia
- Spring Forward by Tom Gilroy
- This Year's Love by David Kane
- Under California – The Limit of Time by Carlos Bolado
- The Wall by Sergio Arau
- Wheels by Djordje Milosavljevic
- Yana's Friends by Arik Kaplun

=== Planet Africa ===
- After the Rain by Ross Kettle
- Chef! by Jean-Marie Teno
- Compensation by Zeinabu irene Davis
- Cry Me a Baby by Tamsin MacCarthy
- La genèse by Cheick Oumar Sissoko
- Harlem Aria by William Jennings
- Hot-Irons by Andrew Dosunmu
- Living with Pride: Ruth Ellis @ 100 by Yvonne Welbon
- Love and Action In Chicago by Dwayne Johnson-Cochran
- Olivia's Story by Charles Burnett
- La petite vendeuse de soleil by Djibril Diop Mambety
- Portrait of a Young Man Drowning by Teboho Mahlatsi
- Rage by Newton I. Aduaka
- Rituals by Carol Mayes
- Third World Cop by Chris Browne

=== Real to Reel ===
- American Movie by Chris Smith
- Barenaked in America by Jason Priestley
- Berlin-Cinema (Titre Provisoire) by Samira Gloor-Fadel
- Bread Day by Sergei Dvortsevoy
- Coven by Mark Borchardt
- Crazy English by Zhang Yuan
- Highway by Sergei Dvortsevoy
- Homo Sapiens 1900 by Peter Cohen
- The Humiliated by Jesper Jargil
- If You Only Understood by Rolando Diaz
- Jam Session by Makoto Shinozaki
- The Jaundiced Eye by Nonny de la Pena
- Juan, I Forgot I Don't Remember by Juan Carlos Rulfo
- The Making of a New Empire by Jos de Putter
- Me & Isaac Newton by Michael Apted
- My Best Fiend by Werner Herzog
- Negative Space by Chris Petit
- Pripyat by Nikolaus Geyrhalter
- Shadow Boxers by Katya Bankowsky
- The Specialist by Eyal Sivan
- Sud by Chantal Akerman
- Three by Issac Julien
- Work and Progress by Vivian Ostrovsky and Yann Beauvais

=== Dialogues: Talking with Pictures ===
- The Awful Truth by Leo McCarey
- Elephant by Alan Clarke
- Hiroshima 28 by Patrick Lung Kong
- Persona by Ingmar Bergman
- Shadows by John Cassavetes
- The Tales of Hoffmann by Michael Powell and Emeric Pressburger
- Why Does Herr R. Run Amok? by Rainer Werner Fassbinder and Michael Fengler
- Yojimbo by Akira Kurosawa

=== Indiscreet Charms: New Spanish Cinema ===
- Solas by Benito Zambrano
- Beloved/Friend by Ventura Pons
- Between Your Legs by Manuel Gomez Pereira
- Do You Really Wanna Know? by Jurdao Faemino, Blanco Faemino, Javier Jurdao and Pedro Blanco
- Dying of Laughter by Álex de la Iglesia
- Fading Memories by Enrique Gabriel
- Flesh by Begona Vicario
- Flowers from Another World by Icíar Bollaín
- Frivolinas by Arturo Carballo
- Golden Whore by Miquel Crespi
- Havana Quartet by Fernando Colomo
- Jealousy by Vicente Aranda
- Lisbon by Antonio Hernández
- The Mole and the Fairy by Grojo
- Rapture by Iván Zulueta
- Roulette by Roberto Santiago
- Washington Wolves by Mariano Barroso

=== Spotlight: Kiyoshi Kurosawa ===
- Barren Illusion by Kiyoshi Kurosawa
- Charisma by Kiyoshi Kurosawa
- Cure by Kiyoshi Kurosawa
- The Excitement of the Do-Re-Mi-Fa Girl by Kiyoshi Kurosawa
- Eyes of the Spider by Kiyoshi Kurosawa
- License to Live by Kiyoshi Kurosawa
- Serpent's Path by Kiyoshi Kurosawa

=== Tribute: The Story of David Overbey ===
- A Better Tomorrow by John Woo
- Beyond Gravity by Garth Maxwell
- Carne by Gaspar Noé
- Distant Voices, Still Lives by Terence Davies
- Dust in the Wind by Hou Hsiao-hsien
- Insiang by Lino Brocka
- Killer of Sheep by Charles Burnett
- Tragedy of an Indian Farmer by Murali Nair

=== Midnight Madness ===
- Born to Lose: The Last Rock and Roll Movie by Lech Kowalski
- Fever by Alex Winter
- Freeway II: Confessions of a Trickbaby by Matthew Bright
- Gamera 3: Revenge of Iris by Shusuke Kaneko
- George Lucas in Love by Joe Nussbaum
- The Item by Dan Clark
- Komodo by Michael Lantieri
- Possessed by Anders Rønnow Klarlund
- Wadd: The Life and Times of John C. Holmes by Cass Paley
- The Wisdom of Crocodiles by Po Chih Leong
