= 1982 in games =

This page lists board and card games, wargames, miniatures games, and tabletop role-playing games published in 1982. For video games, see 1982 in video gaming.

== Games released or invented in 1982 ==
- Ant Wars
- Battle Damage: Code Red
- By the Sword!
- Continuo
- Duel Magical
- Dawn Patrol
- Fields of Action
- Fighting Fantasy
- Fringeworthy (role-playing game)
- FTL:2448 (role-playing game)
- Gangbusters (role-playing game)
- Man, Myth & Magic (role-playing game)
- Phase 10
- Sequence
- Survive!
- Star Frontiers (role-playing game)
- Star Trek: The Role Playing Game
- Starfleet Voyages (role-playing game)
- Starship Captain
- Swordbearer (role-playing game)
- True Dough Mania
- Wizards

== Game awards given in 1982 ==
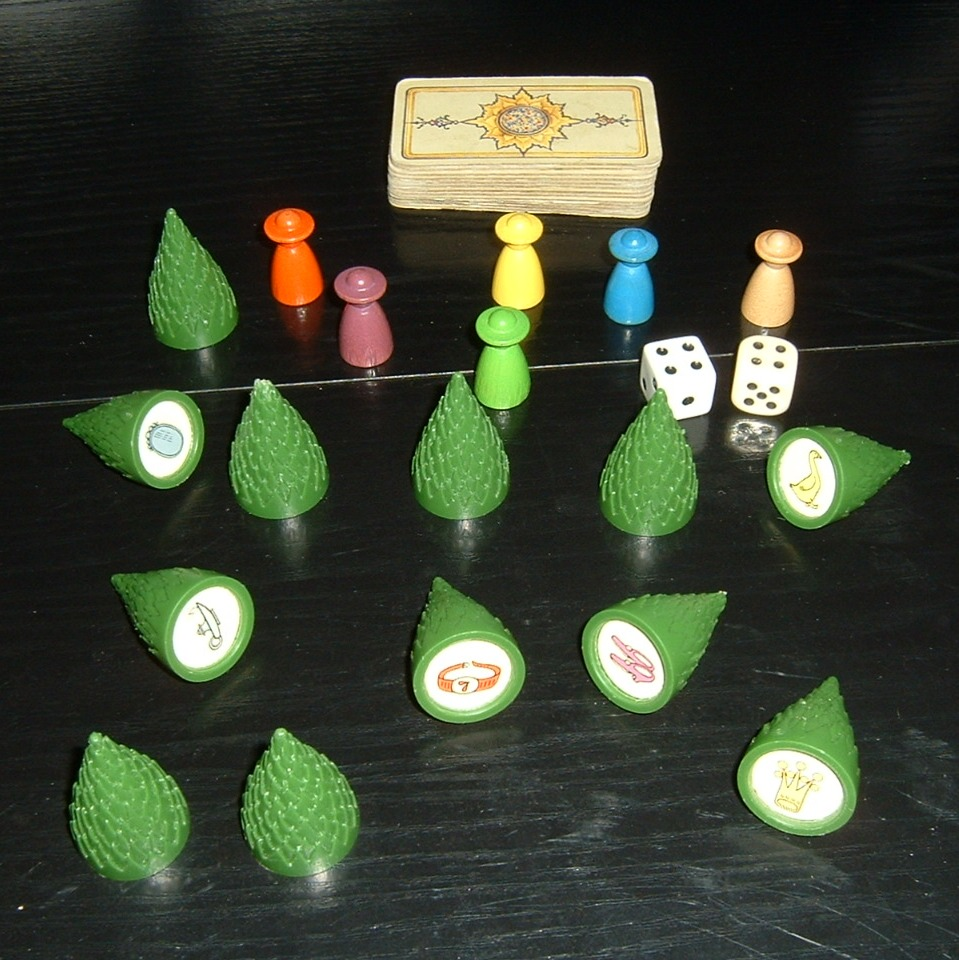
Pieces from the original German Sagaland game, winner of the 1982 Spiel des Jahres prize

- Spiel des Jahres: Enchanted Forest (German title is Sagaland)

== Significant game-related events in 1982 ==
- Trivial Pursuit was published, becoming the first trivia game.
- TSR, Inc. purchased assets of Simulations Publications, Inc. following its bankruptcy.

== Deaths ==
Date	Name	Age	Notability
January 24	Karol Borsuk	76	Mathematician and board game designer
June 8	Harriet T. Righter	104	President of Selchow and Righter
September 23	Gene Day	31	Comics and games artist

== See also ==
- 1982 in video games
