= Mazesoba =

Mazesoba (Japanese: まぜそば) may refer to:

- Aburasoba, Japanese noodle dish category
  - Taiwan mazesoba, a noodle dish from Nagoya, Japan
