= Peter Trueman =

Canadian journalist (1934–2021)

Peter Trueman OC
- Born: William Peter Main Trueman; December 25, 1934; Sackville, New Brunswick, Canada
- Died: July 23, 2021 (aged 86); Toronto, Ontario, Canada
- Occupations: Journalist, news presenter
- Years active: 1954–1988
- Employer(s): Ottawa Journal, Montreal Star, Toronto Star, Canadian Broadcasting Corporation, Global Television Network, CTV
- Spouse: Eleanor Wark (m. 1956)
- Children: 3
- Parent(s): Albert Trueman and Jean Miller

William Peter Main Trueman OC (December 25, 1934 – July 23, 2021) was a Canadian television and radio personality, best known for his work for the Global Television Network between 1974 and 1977, and from 1978 to July 1988. In the 1960s and early 1970s he was a reporter, editor and producer for CBC News.

== Early life ==
Trueman was born in Sackville, New Brunswick, on December 25, 1934. He was the son of Albert Trueman, an academic and arts administrator. His journalism career began as a print reporter with the Ottawa Journal in the 1950s.

== Career ==
When Trueman was 23, he moved to the Montreal Star to be their New York City-based columnist and would cover the assassination of John F. Kennedy for the paper. His print career also took him to the Toronto Star. In 1970, he moved to television as executive producer of CBC's flagship newscast The National.

Trueman produced The National during the FLQ Crisis in 1970. In his memoirs, he recalled being ordered to censor the CBC's coverage of the crisis: "We were to avoid commentary and speculation of all kinds. We were not to use man-on-the-street interviews or shoot film of any public demonstration. We were to air no panel discussions on the October Crisis and were to avoid reporting speculation, particularly speculation about what the government was doing." Trueman also reprimanded reporter Tim Ralfe for his memorable confrontation with Pierre Trudeau on the steps of parliament in which Ralfe debated the Prime Minister asking how far he was willing to go which prompted Trudeau's famous "Just watch me" line. Trueman later apologised for not challenging the CBC's censorship and for reprimanding the reporter saying, "I should have given Ralfe a medal."

Trueman became the first anchor for Global News in 1974. He became well known for his commentaries in the last minutes of each broadcast which he would end by saying, "That is not news. But that, too, is reality".

Trueman briefly left Global in 1977 to join rival network CTV, becoming one of the co-hosts of CTV Reports, a short-lived, unsuccessful attempt to replace two of the network's news magazine/documentary shows, W5 and Maclear; within a few months, Trueman would return to Global.

Trueman retired permanently from Global News in 1988 "in disgust" over the declining quality of news coverage at the network. He later joined Vision TV to host a 26-part series called North-South about Canada's relation to the Third World.

Trueman also served as host and managing editor of the Discovery Channel's award-winning series Great Canadian Parks in 1996 and oversaw a series of documentaries for the History Channel featuring national historic sites. In 2002, he hosted Destination Parks with Peter Trueman on the CTV Travel network.

== Awards and honours ==
Trueman was appointed a member of the Order of Canada in May 2001 and invested in October of the following year. He was conferred the Queen Elizabeth II Diamond Jubilee Medal in 2012.

== Personal life ==
Trueman married Eleanor in 1956. They remained married for 64 years until his death. Together, they had three children: Anne, Mark and Victoria. Mark joined Global News in 1982 and is senior producer of Global News Toronto as of 2021. One of his grandchildren, Devin, works as a control room operator at Global.

After retiring in 1988, Trueman and his wife moved to Amherst Island in Lake Ontario. There, he co-founded CJAI-FM, a community radio station which began broadcasting in 2006. He died on July 23, 2021, in Toronto. He was 86, and had suffered from cancer prior to his death.
