= Just Watch Me: Trudeau and the '70s Generation =

- Directed by: Catherine Annau
- Produced by: Gerry Flahive; Yves Bisaillon
- Cinematography: Ronald Plante
- Edited by: Craig Webster
- Music by: Rick Tait
- Production company: National Film Board of Canada
- Release date: 1999
- Running time: 75 minutes
- Country: Canada
- Language: English

Just Watch Me: Trudeau and the '70s Generation (French title: Frenchkiss : La génération du rêve Trudeau) is a Canadian documentary film by Catherine Annau, produced in 1999 by the National Film Board of Canada.

The documentary follows eight Generation Xers from various parts of Canada that have been impacted by former Prime Minister Pierre Trudeau's vision of a bilingual and bicultural nation whereby people would have the ability to speak both French and English in all parts of Canada. These eight people consisted of a mix of Anglo and Franco, separatist and federalist, idealist and realist. People who had different ambitions and dreams for their nation, however, shared one thing in common: They are the Trudeau Generation. Director Catherine Annau and her cinematographer Ronald Plante takes the viewers on a cross-country journey introducing us to places we probably never knew existed. From the ice slopes of Iqaluit to the cosmopolitan Calgary we get a chance to witness the impact Trudeau's bilingual revolution had on this generation through the eyes of the eight individuals.

Though his policies were deemed unordinary and sometimes incomprehensible, Pierre Elliot Trudeau was a politician many could relate to. Trudeau loved life, he wasn't afraid to speak his mind and was often known for calling out reporters. However, through his easy-going character, he managed to touch deeply into the younger generation's conscious. Just Watch Me: Trudeau and the '70s Generation is a great testimony to this. "I am the product of a social experiment -- an experiment that was pushed for and initiated by Pierre Trudeau to make the country bilingual," 32-year-old westerner Doug Garson says at the beginning of the documentary, "I was going to be that generation. The generation of English people living on the prairies who could speak French." The documentary remains the first and probably only documentary to examine Canada's bilingualism through the eyes of the Generation Xers. Annau's inspiration derived after the 1995 Quebec referendum where she felt her generation's voices were being sidelined."In Canada, you're conditioned to believe that you don't get to tell your story until you're 40," the Toronto-born filmmaker told Maclean's in an interview. "I was tired of watching men in suits discussing the future of Canada as if it was an abstract political science experiment." Her work drew passionate, funny, thoughtful and very oppositional subjects together to share their stories. Quebec City's Sylvain Marois, a separatist, mournfully recalls how his marriage to an anglophone almost ended due to the tensions created by the 1995 referendum. John Duffy, who grew up in Toronto and went on to become a Bay Street consultant, recalls thinking Montrealers "were all sitting around having absinthe and fantastic sex all day and you're stuck here in Toronto." In support of Trudeau's vision, these testimonials were presented both in English and French proving that while his notion of a bilingual country may not have manifested itself, it still sits well for some Canadians.

The name of the movie comes from "just watch me", a phrase made famous by Trudeau in October 1970 when he spoke of his determination to restore civil order in Quebec during the October Crisis. Trudeau, who in the previous years had become known as a strong proponent of civil liberties, addressed the need for immediate and drastic action to bring back order in Quebec. When a CBC reporter Tim Ralfe questioned him on his strategy to maintain order, he replied with the famous phrase, "Well, just watch me."

Actor Evan Adams was one of the eight interview subjects. The film's soundtrack incorporates Canadian pop songs in both of Canada's official languages, with songs by The Stampeders, Bachman-Turner Overdrive, Leonard Cohen, Robert Charlebois and Beau Dommage.

Awards for the film include Best Canadian First Feature Film at the 1999 Toronto International Film Festival, and the Genie Award for Best Feature Length Documentary.
