= Fuddle duddle =

Incident in Canadian political history

The fuddle duddle incident in Canadian political history occurred on February 16, 1971, when Prime Minister of Canada Pierre Trudeau was alleged to have spoken or at least mouthed unparliamentary language in the House of Commons, causing a minor scandal. Trudeau mentioned the words "fuddle duddle" in an ambiguous answer to questions about what he may or may not have said in Parliament.

In February 1971, opposition MPs accused Trudeau of having mouthed the words "fuck off" at them in the House of Commons. When pressed by television reporters on the matter, Trudeau would only freely admit having moved his lips, answering the question, "What were you thinking, when you moved your lips?" by rhetorically asking in return "What is the nature of your thoughts, gentlemen, when you say 'fuddle duddle' or something like that? God, you guys!" Thus, it remained unclear what Trudeau actually mouthed.

In a 2015 speech, his son, and later Prime Minister, Justin Trudeau stated that his father "didn't actually just say 'fuddle duddle'".

== Origin of the phrase ==
Trudeau may have coined the phrase on the spot. It did not gain wide currency in the long term, and did not enter most dictionaries of Canadian English other than the Canadian Oxford Dictionary.

== Media coverage ==
An unofficial transcript of the CBC clip is as follows:

John Lundrigan: The question I raised to the Right Honourable Prime Minister of Canada was that the government should introduce some new programs to lift the unemployment burden over and above what has been announced since last March. The Prime Minister interrupted me in a way that you wouldn't expect on the street, by mouthing a four-letter obscenity which I've challenged him to verbally place on the record and I don't think he's done so since. And I certainly didn't expect this kind of behaviour from my Prime Minister of Canada, having worshipped and really adored men like John Diefenbaker and Mr. Pearson and a lot of other people in the past. This to me is really inexcusable and, well, I guess we're just going to have to grin and bear it, along with the Lapalme workers.

Lincoln Alexander: He mouthed two words, the first word of which started with F and the second word of which started with O. And he said it twice to John Lundrigan, the member from Gander—Twillingate, and he also said the same thing to me. Now I think that we've reached a point where this type of conduct, it's not only disgraceful but it's unacceptable, and I tried to bring that point home. Now of course the Prime Minister wants to split hairs and states that he didn't say it, but when he mouthed it, it was readily recognizable by me as to what he said and what he meant.

Pierre Trudeau: Well what are they, lip readers or something?

Press: Did you…?

Pierre Trudeau: Of course I didn't say anything. I mean that's a...

Press: Did you mouth anything?

Pierre Trudeau: I moved my lips and I used my hands in a gesture of derision, yes. But I didn't say anything. If these guys want to read lips and they want to see something into it, you know that's their problem. I think they're very sensitive. They come in the House and they make all kinds of accusations, and because I smile at them in derision they come stomping out and what, go crying to mamma or to television that they've been insulted or something?

[later in the press conference]

Pierre Trudeau: Well, it's a lie, because I didn't say anything.

Press: Sir, did you mouth it?

Pierre Trudeau: [visibly annoyed] What does "mouth" mean?

Press: Move your lips.

Pierre Trudeau: Move your lips? Yes, I moved my lips!

Press: In the words you've been quoted as saying?

Pierre Trudeau: [half smile] No.

Press: (After murmurs by other press) What were you thinking... when you moved your lips?

Pierre Trudeau: What is the nature of your thoughts, gentlemen, when you say "fuddle duddle" or something like that? God, you guys...! [walks away]

== In popular culture ==
There was, in 1971–72, a short-lived satirical magazine called Fuddle Duddle: The Hansard of the Common People, which aspired to be the Canadian equivalent of Mad magazine. However, it lasted only five issues before publication ceased.

At least two songs related to the incident were released as record singles, and made the lower reaches of the Canadian charts. "Fuddle Duddle" by Antique Fair was written by Greg Hambleton and released on the Tuesday label through Quality Records (catalogue GH107X), reaching #68 on RPM's national chart. "Do the Fuddle Duddle" was written by Gary Alles, performed by The House of Commons and released on GRT Records (catalogue 1233–04). It peaked at #82 on the RPM chart. Members of the ad hoc group "The House of Commons" later helped form the successful Canadian chart group Dr. Music. The Rolf Harris song "Vancouver Town '71" (#68 in Canada) also mentions how Alaskan oil could "leave our coast all fuddle-duddled up".

Mont Tremblant Resort has a ski run named Fuddle Duddle. Trudeau had been a regular visitor to the resort in the past.

=== Justin Trudeau ===
A similar incident took place on December 14, 2011, when Trudeau's son Justin, MP for Papineau, during Question Period in the House of Commons, shouted out the words "piece of shit" when Peter Kent, the Conservative Environment Minister, criticized NDP environment critic Megan Leslie for not attending the Durban Conference on climate change, despite the government banning all opposition MPs from joining Canada's delegation.

Later on, when Justin Trudeau was prime minister, another incident occurred on May 4, 2022, when Conservative MP John Brassard accused Trudeau of "unparliamentary language" and "dropping an F-bomb" during a heated debate in Question Period. Upon leaving the chamber, Trudeau was asked by reporters to comment on the allegations; in an apparent reference to his father's response to the Fuddle Duddle controversy, he said, "what is the nature of your thoughts, gentlemen, when you say — when you move your lips in a particular way?"

Reporting the results of the 2015 Canadian federal election, the Toronto Sun newspaper front cover headline was "Fuddle Duddle" in response to the Justin Trudeau Liberal majority outcome.

== See also ==
- Just society
- Just watch me
- Trudeauism
- Trudeaumania
