= Small-l liberal =

Small-l liberal refers to people who are ideologically liberal but are not necessarily members of a political party named "Liberal".

It may refer to:

- Liberalism in Australia
  - Moderates (Liberal Party of Australia), the moderate faction of the Liberal Party of Australia
- Liberalism in Canada
- Liberalism in the United Kingdom
