= By the Sword =

By the Sword may refer to:

- By the Sword (novel), fantasy by Mercedes Lackey in 1991
- By the Sword (film), directed by Jeremy Paul Kagan in 1991
- By the Sword (manga), a series by Sanami Matoh in 2000
- By the Sword (EP) (and song) by Emilie Autumn in 2001
- By the Sword, a book by Richard Cohen on the history of sword fighting in 2002
- "By the Sword" (song), a 2010 single by Slash
- By the Sword!, a 1982 board game purported to be derived from a Nordic poem
