= Chieftain Products =

Canadian toy and game company

Chieftain Products was a Canada-based toy and game company which released games such as Scrabble, Atmosfear, etc. Founded in 1972 by Edward J. Scott in Toronto, Ontario, this toy company was closed down in 1996 after the release of Atmosfear 4. It moved in 1980 to North York, Ontario.

== Products ==
- Mastermind (1972)
- True Dough Mania (1982)
- Scrabble (1984)
- Atmosfear (1991–1996)
- paint and coloring books
- crayons
- pencils
- pens
- brushes and other applicators
- children's books
- games
- cross-word and jigsaw puzzles
- dolls
- doll houses
- doll furniture
- doll clothing
- hobby and craft sets
- replica model kits
- toy construction kits
- hamburger game
- Corking Set Tricotin knitting toy

== Sources ==
- Virtual Museum of Canada: Photograph of toy oven from Chieftain Products
- Rules for the game of Amnesia from Chieftain Products, including the company's Downsview address
- Nightmare/Atmosfear Homepage FAQ
- "Canadian firms take on Coleco (Avanti Productions Ltd; Chieftain Products Inc)." The Financial Post 82.6 (Feb 6, 1988): 9. CPI.Q (Canadian Periodicals). Thomson Gale. TORONTO PUBLIC LIBRARIES (CELPLO). 10 Oct. 2006
- Wickstrom, Andy. "Will this nightmare be a sweet dream for video stores? (Chieftain Inc.'s video board game, 'Nightmare')." Video Business 12.n29 (August 14, 1992): 38(1). General Reference Center Gold. Thomson Gale. TORONTO PUBLIC LIBRARIES (CELPLO). 10 Oct. 2006
