= Tsuyoshi Ujiki =

Tsuyoshi Ujiki うじき つよし
- Also known as: Jick
- Born: 氏木 毅 September 18, 1957 (age 68); Setagaya, Tokyo, Japan
- Genres: Rock
- Occupations: Entertainer, actor, musician, singer
- Instruments: Vocals, guitar
- Years active: 1980–present
- Labels: Heart Cleaning Company; Flos
- Formerly of: Kodomo Band
- Website: Official profile

Tsuyoshi Ujiki (氏木 毅(うじき つよし), Ujiki Tsuyoshi; born September 18, 1957, in Setagaya, Tokyo, Japan) is a Japanese entertainer, actor, musician, and singer who is represented by the talent agencies Heart Cleaning Company, then Flos. His nicknamed Jick (stylized as JICK) from his surname. Along with Seiji Katsu, he was a member of Kodomo Band.

== Filmography ==
=== TV series ===
Year	Title	Role	Notes	Ref.
2001	Hōjō Tokimune	Takezaki Suenaga	Taiga drama	
2005	Yoshitsune	Suruga Jiro	Taiga drama	

=== Films ===
Year	Title	Role	Notes	Ref.
1997	Cure	Shin Sakuma		
2026	Fujiko	Fujiko's father		
