= Fascination Amour =

1999 Hong Kong film by Herman Yau

- Film poster
- Traditional Chinese: 愛情夢幻號
- Simplified Chinese: 爱情梦幻号
- Hanyu Pinyin: Ài Qíng Mèng Huàn Hào
- Jyutping: Ngoi3 Cing4 Mung6 Waan6 Hou6
- Directed by: Herman Yau
- Screenplay by: Raymond Wong; Chau Ting; Wong Ho-wa
- Produced by: Raymond Wong
- Starring: Andy Lau; Hikari Ishida
- Cinematography: Joe Chan
- Edited by: Robert Choi
- Music by: Mak Chun Hung
- Production companies: Mandarin Films; Fitto Movie
- Distributed by: Mandarin Films Distribution
- Release date: 13 February 1999
- Running time: 95 minutes
- Country: Hong Kong
- Languages: Cantonese; Mandarin; Japanese; English
- Box office: HK$8,889,770

Fascination Amour is a 1999 Hong Kong romantic comedy film directed by Herman Yau and starring Andy Lau and Hikari Ishida.

== Plot ==
Albert Lai (Andy Lau) is the only child of Hong Kong's richest tycoon. Albert brings Kathy (Qu Ying), a waitress introduced to him by his mother (Susan Tse), onto a cruise ship, where on the first date night, he receives the approval of Kathy and gets engaged. This is already Albert's eighth engagement since love always comes and goes very quick for him, and he would always break an engagement whenever he loses the feeling of novelty in each relationship.

Albert becomes increasingly fond of Kathy's ability to cope decently. It turns out Kathy has been secretly struggling to study the topic of the second day of the cruise, making her feel extremely exhausted. At this time, Kathy meets Timothy (Huang Lei), a waiter on the ship, who came from a same background as her. Kathy feels unrestrained while being with Timothy, and thus, her heart starts to shift.

However, Albert is unwilling to give up and he is confident that he will be able to win Kathy back with his charm. At this time, Sandy (Hikari Ishida) appears around Timothy and she views Albert as an enemy. Compared to Albert, Sandy is far more acerbic and a much bigger spender. However, Albert gradually discovers that while Sandy is not bickering with him, he feels empty and lonely, a feeling that he has never had. Before, nobody had dared to point out Albert's shortcomings, only Sandy dared to point them out publicly. As he comes in contact with Sandy more, he becomes attracted to her personality.

While the ship is to dock and Albert wants to express his feelings, he discovers police officers on shore waiting for Sandy. It turns out that Sandy is bankrupt and this will be her last journey. Whether or not Kathy and Timothy can be together, or whether Albert is able to reverse the adverse and win Sandy's heart, there will always be an end on a wandering life on a ship when it goes to shore.

== Cast ==
- Andy Lau as Albert Lai
- Hikari Ishida as Sandy Fong
- Lillian Ho as Maggie Lai
- Qu Ying as Kathy Luk
- Huang Lei as Timothy Wong
- Raymond Wong as Jack
- Christine Ng as Rose
- Anthony Wong as Eric
- Astrid Chan as Mandy
- Susan Tse as Mrs. Lai
- James Ha as Albert's assistant
- Nelson Cheung as Albert's friend on cruise
- Shrila Chun as Albert's friend on cruise

== Production ==
In 2010, when Andy Lau appeared on the Taiwanese talk show Kangxi Lai Le, he revealed that this film left him with some regrets. He stated that while he was paid over HK$10 million, when he went aboard the cruise ship to film at the Caribbean Sea, after the film company paid him his salary, they did not have any money to hire crew members and extra actors, and thus, Lau was very busy on set having to take care of other crew work.

Speaking of how he felt cheated when he got on board, Lau stated,

It was only after I got on board that I discovered there were only a few actors, with nothing else, and only a few crew members.

On set, Lau had to pave the rails for the cameras to move, worked as set coordinator and invited cruise passengers to work as extras.

There was a dancing scene which all the extra actors were hired by me. I could not believe that it would become like this after he (film investor) paid me.

== Reception ==
=== Critical ===
Love HK Film gave the film a negative review: "Designed solely to make money during the Lunar New Year, this fluffy romantic comedy rests solely on Lau’s able shoulders. Sadly, the filmmakers didn’t give him a proper character."

=== Box office ===
The film grossed HK $8,889,770 at the Hong Kong box office during its theatrical run from 13 February to 19 March 1999 in Hong Kong.

== See also ==
- Andy Lau filmography
- List of Hong Kong films of 1999
- List of films set in Puerto Rico
