= Hikari Ishida =

Japanese actress (born 1972)

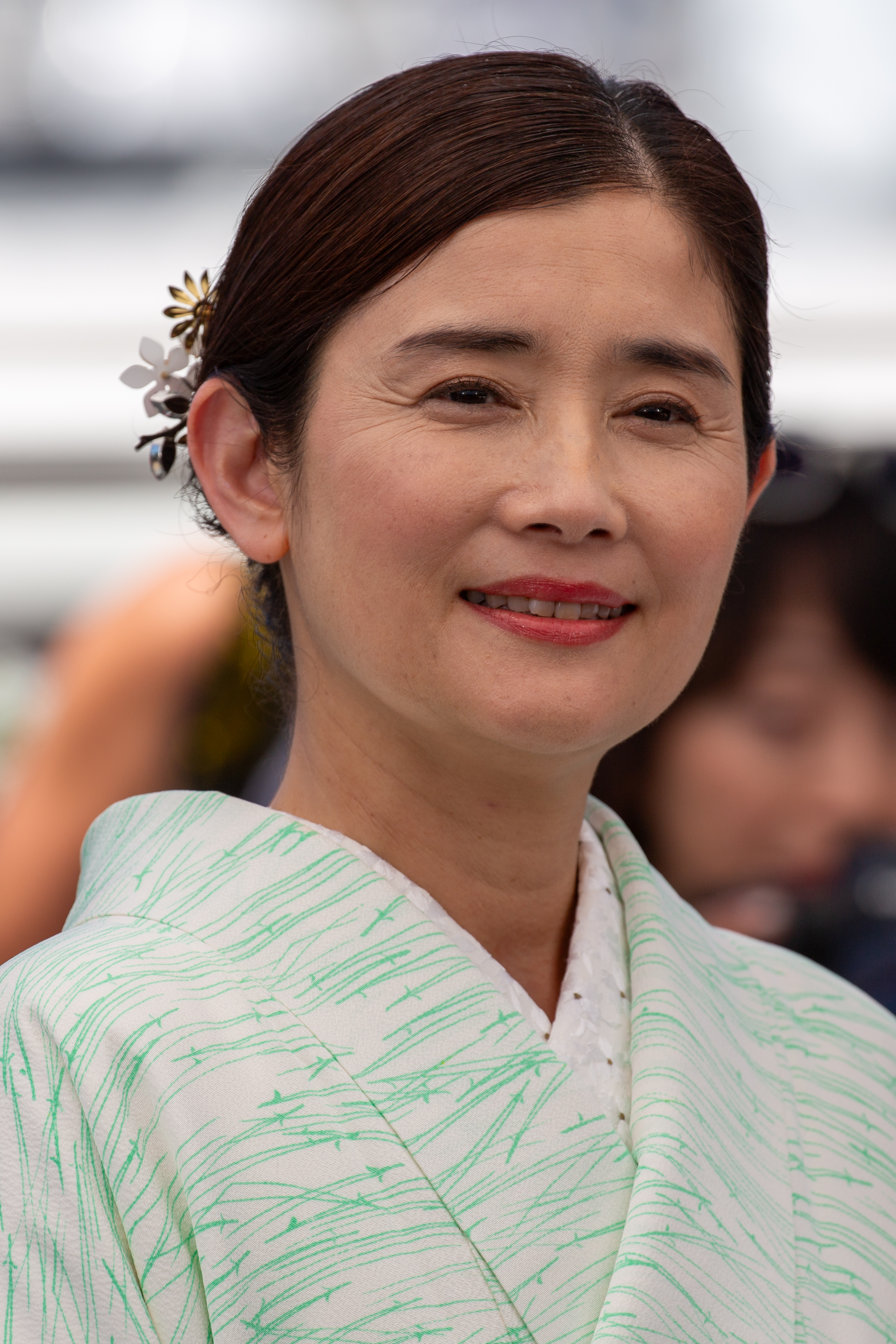
- Ishida at the 2025 Cannes Film Festival
- Born: May 25, 1972 (age 54); Tokyo, Japan
- Occupations: Actress, singer
- Years active: 1986–present
- Spouse: Kei Kurube (m. 2001)
- Children: 2

Hikari Ishida (Japanese: 石田ひかり, Hepburn: Ishida Hikari) (born May 25, 1972) is a Japanese actress. She starred along with Megumi Odaka and Natsuki Ozawa in the TV-series Hana no Asuka-gumi!. She also released several singles and six albums and she had one minor hit with the song "Emerald no Suna". Ishida also made numerous commercials for hair products and released several photobooks and videos. Ishida has had at least one song appear on the NHK program Minna no Uta. She is the younger sister of Yuriko Ishida, who is also an actress.

== Biography ==
Hikari Ishida was born on May 25, 1972 in Tokyo, Japan. She is the third child of her family; her brother is three years older and her sister, Yuriko Ishida, is two years older. As a toddler, her family nicknamed her "Pika", which her long-time friends continued to call her as a teenager. Due to her father's job, Ishida's family relocated to Taiwan, where she finished the last four years of elementary schooling. Ishida learned Mandarin Chinese while in Taiwan but did not retain fluency after she returned to Japan. While in 5th grade, she briefly wanted to become a singer before deciding to pursue acting. She debuted in the entertainment industry in 1986 at the age of 15.

While pursuing her postsecondary education, Ishida limited her acting career to one television drama a year while also appearing in commercials and giving magazine interviews. While it provided a break from acting during half the year, she felt it added pressure for the single show to be successful. During her free time, Ishida would frequently play video games like Super Tetris and Tetris 2 + BomBliss as well as games popular at her university, such as Dragon Quest and horse racing games. Prior to her university graduation in the spring of 1995, Kagayaku Toki no Nakade began airing on Fuji TV. The show included much of the production staff from her previous drama, Asunaro Hakusho.

She married in 2001 and eventually had two children. Upon going to college in 2024, Ishida's daughter began a part-time job. Ishida also found a part-time job at an acquaintance's restaurant in solidarity. She posted a video on her YouTube channel about the experience, noting that because she had always been working in entertainment at that age, she had never held a part-time job before.

== Filmography ==
=== Film ===
- Futari (1991)
- Kamitsukitai / Dorakiyura Yori Ai-0 (1991)
- Aitsu (1991)
- AD Boogie (1991)
- Haruka, Nosutarujii (1993)
- Beru Epokku (1998)
- Fascination Amour (1999)
- Adrenaline Drive (1999)
- Ano Natsu no Hi (1999)
- Kankoku no Obaachan wa Erai (2002)
- Tenkôsei: Sayonara Anata (2007)
- Have a Song on Your Lips (2015), Shizuru Nakamura
- Rin (2018)
- Skeleton Flowers (2021)
- Homestay (2022)
- Grown-ups (2022)
- 90 Years Old – So What? (2024)
- Blue Period (2024), Marie Yaguchi
- 366 Days (2025), Yukiko Makiya
- Let's Meet at Angie's Bar (2025), Azusa
- Renoir (2025), Utako
- Rewrite (2025), Kazumi Otsuki
- The Girl at the End of the Line (2026), Mieko
- Satoko Always (2026), Satoko Iijima

=== Television ===
- Hana no Asuka-gumi! (1988)
- Mama Haha Bugi (1989) (mini)
- 1970 Bokutachi no Seishun (1991)
- Hirari (1992) (Asadora)
- Asunaro Hakusho (1993)
- Kagayaku Toki no Nakade (1995)
- Tokugawa Yoshinobu (1998), Mika
- Smap x Smap (1998)
- Kôrei (2000)
- Suiyobi no Joji (2001)
- Karuta kuîn (2003)
- Haken no Hinkaku (2007) (mini)
- Toppu Sêrusu (2008)
- Dan Dan (2009) (Asadora)
- Only I Am 17 Years Old (2020) (Webdrama)
- The Way of the Househusband (2020)
- My Girlfriend's Child (2024)

== Discography ==
- Emerald no Suna / Shiokaze no Himitsu (May 21, 1987) (single)
- Ku.chi.bi.ru / Kiniro no Necklace (04.08.1987) (single)
- Legend (September 21, 1987) (album)
- Koi wa Kakuritsu 51% / Lonely Lonely (04.11.1987) (single)
- Monument (09.03.1988) (album)
- Futari no Kankei / Pastel Memory (April 21, 1988) (single)
- White Virgin (June 21, 1988) (album)
- Shojo.Neppun.Tennenshoku / Ichimai no Shashin (July 13, 1988) (single)
- Koibitotachi no Nuance / Yume o Samenaide (11.10.1988) (single)
- True (October 21, 1988) (album)
- Koi nanonine / Unubore Kagami (February 21, 1989) (single)
- Lamination (April 21, 1989) (album)
- Natural Choice / Nocturne Saigo no Himitsu (July 7, 1989) (single)
- Kaze no Ballerina / Mou Hitori no Akuma (October 18, 1989) (single)
- Rendezvous (November 21, 1989) (album)
- Tomorrow (March 21, 1990) (single)
