= Where Lies the Homo? =

- Directed by: Jean-François Monette
- Written by: Jean-François Monette
- Produced by: Jean-François Monette
- Cinematography: Michael Wees
- Edited by: Jean-François Monette
- Release date: 1999
- Running time: 35 minutes
- Country: Canada
- Language: English

Where Lies the Homo? is a Canadian short documentary film, directed by Jean-François Monette and released in 1999.

== Summary ==
A film collage, the film is composed of diverse video clips from theatrical films, home videos, cartoons and other found footage, compiled into an essay film about Monette's own journey toward constructing his personal identity as a gay man.

== Background ==
Monette described the film as partially a response to the 1995 documentary film The Celluloid Closet, which he felt had missed some important moments of LGBTQ representation in underground and experimental film.

== Release and reception ==
The film was screened at various film festivals in 1999, most notably in the Perspective Canada program at the 1999 Toronto International Film Festival. It won the award for Best Gay and Lesbian Film Award at the 1999 Ann Arbor Film Festival.
