= Scott Beveridge =

Canadian LGBTQ film director

Scott Beveridge (born 1964) is a Canadian independent film director and video artist, who was one of the key figures in LGBTQ art in Canada in the 1990s. He is most noted for his 1999 short film Quiver, which premiered at the 1999 Toronto International Film Festival, and was one of the winners of the award for Best Canadian Short Film at the 2000 Inside Out Film and Video Festival.

A graduate of the University of British Columbia, where he was active with the student gay and lesbian group, he later worked as an HIV/AIDS educator and outreach worker. He began making video art with the filmmaking collective Vtape in the 1990s, and studied at the Canadian Film Centre.

He first became widely known for his 1993 film When You Name Me, about anti-gay violence. It was typically reported in this era that Beveridge's short films were all entirely self-funded.

Quiver starred journalist Gerald Hannon in a sexually explicit short film about S&M.

== Films ==
- Untitled (1992)
- When You Name Me (1993)
- Taking Control (1994)
- What's His Face (1995)
- For Madness Is Freedom in Prison (1996)
- Quiver (1999)
- Odessa (2000)
