= Trudeaumania =

Excitement generated by Pierre Trudeau

Trudeaumania was the term used during 1968 to describe the excitement generated by Pierre Elliott Trudeau's entry into the April 1968 Liberal Party of Canada leadership election. Trudeau won the leadership election and was sworn in as prime minister. Trudeaumania continued during the subsequent federal election (in which the Liberals won a strong majority government) and during Trudeau's early years as prime minister. Decades later, Trudeau's son, Justin Trudeau, drew a similar international reaction when he became prime minister in 2015.

== "Trudeaumania" and Pierre Elliott Trudeau ==
According to much contemporary journalism during the election, many young people in Canada, especially young women, were influenced by the 1960s counterculture and identified with Trudeau, an energetic nonconformist who was relatively young. They were dazzled by his "charm and good looks", and a large fan base was claimed to exist throughout the country. He would often be stopped in the streets for his autograph or for photographs. Trudeau had once sympathized with Marxists and had spent time in the democratic socialist Cooperative Commonwealth Federation, and many of his fans were attracted to his culturally liberal stances (he legalized homosexuality and created more flexible abortion and divorce laws as Justice Minister under Prime Minister Lester B. Pearson). Trudeau was also admired for his laid-back attitude and his celebrity relationships; in that word's prevailing use at the time, describing a modern, "hip and happening person", he was often described as a swinger.

The House of Commons after the Liberals' victory in the 1968 election

When Pearson announced his intention to step down, Trudeau entered the race for the Liberal leadership. His energetic campaign attracted widespread media attention and mobilized many who saw Trudeau as a symbol of generational change. On April 6, Trudeau was elected leader on the fourth ballot, with the support of 51 percent of the delegates. He was sworn in as prime minister on April 20, and subsequently called an election for June 25. A high point happened during Trudeau's election campaign during the annual Saint-Jean-Baptiste Day parade in Montreal, when rioting Quebec separatists threw rocks and bottles at the grandstand where Trudeau was seated. Rejecting the pleas of his aides that he take cover, Trudeau stayed in his seat, facing the rioters, without any sign of fear. The image of the politician showing such courage impressed the Canadian people. He handily won the election the next day, with the Liberals winning a comfortable majority government; this was the party's first majority victory since 1953.

Trudeaumania began to abate as a media theme in the early 1970s due to rising inflation and rising unemployment; in the 1972 election, Trudeau lost his majority and narrowly won a minority government. However, he served a total of 15 and a half years as prime minister (from 1968 to 1979 and 1980 to 1984) and won two additional majority governments in 1974 and 1980. Trudeau is remembered as one of Canada's most polarizing politicians and prime ministers, fondly recalled by many Central and Eastern Canadians. He was, however, deeply unpopular among conservative and nationalist thinkers, especially in Quebec and the western provinces; opposition to Trudeau was particularly vehement in Alberta, which long viewed him as an adversary for his National Energy Policy of 1980-85, leading to a renewal of western alienation. Trudeau was nevertheless named the Canadian Newsmaker of the 20th Century by the Canadian Press at the dawn of the year 2000. When he died later that year, there was an outpouring of public grief, and he was again named Newsmaker of the Year for 2000 itself. In 2004, he was voted the third-Greatest Canadian by CBC viewers, after Terry Fox and Tommy Douglas.

A Canadian board game of the early 1980s, "True Dough Mania", was titled with a pun on the phenomenon. The game was a satire on Canadian politics.

== Criticisms ==
Some revisionist historians of Canadian politics deny that Trudeaumania ever substantially existed, or believed it was largely a media invention to promote Pierre Trudeau or sell newspapers, similar to the over-romanticized description of John F. Kennedy's term as Camelot. Robert Wright critiques the persistent media myth of "the hipster Montrealer who drove up to Ottawa in his Mercedes in 1965," and Paul Litt, claiming that the phrase was made up by newspaper columnist Lubor Zink, similarly views the phenomenon as exaggerated by supportive journalists and pundits, including Peter C. Newman and Pierre Berton.

== Justin Trudeau ==
In 2015, Pierre Trudeau's son, Justin Trudeau, became prime minister after he led the Liberals to a majority government in the 2015 federal election. In the international press and online, Justin Trudeau drew comments as he was a senior Canadian politician who was unexpectedly young-looking and handsome in the general public's opinion.

== See also ==
- Trudeauism
- Jacindamania
- Jokowi Effect
- Just watch me
- Fuddle duddle
