= True Dough Mania =

Canadian board game

True Dough Mania is a Canadian board game, created by George J. Reti, which was released in 1982 by Chieftain Products. Subtitled "a game of chance where you have no chance", the game was a satire on Canadian politics. The name was a pun on "Trudeaumania", the name given to the aura of excitement surrounding Pierre Trudeau in the 1968 election; Trudeau was still Canada's Prime Minister in 1982, but his popularity had waned significantly.

In the game, each player is the owner of a Canadian business. Players roll the dice and advance around a map of Canada. On some squares, the player is required to draw a "Cabinet Shuffle" or "Constitution" card, and follow the directions on the card (much like the "Chance" and "Community Chest" cards in Monopoly).

The winner is the first player to lose all of their company's assets to the federal government.
