= Johnny (1999 film) =

- Directed by: Carl Bessai
- Written by: Carl Bessai
- Produced by: Carl Bessai
- Starring: Chris Martin; Gema Zamprogna; Kris Lemche
- Cinematography: John Westheuser
- Edited by: Manfred Becker
- Production company: Raven West Films
- Release date: September 14, 1999 (TIFF)
- Running time: 84 minutes
- Country: Canada
- Language: English

Johnny is a 1999 Canadian drama film, written, produced, and directed by Carl Bessai. Inspired by the Dogme 95 movement, the film stars Chris Martin as Johnny, a young man who is making a film about squeegee kids around Toronto, but begins to manipulate them into performing increasingly dangerous stunts.

The cast also includes Gema Zamprogna, Kris Lemche, Vanessa Shaver, Clinton Walker, Rainbow Sun Francks, Kyra Harper, Hrothgar Mathews, Sabrina Grdevich and Hugh Dillon.

The film was inspired by Bessai's prior work on a documentary about street kids, during which he found that many of them had difficulty expressing themselves until he gave them video cameras and asked them to film something that represented their own first-person views of their lives.

The film premiered in the Perspective Canada program at the 1999 Toronto International Film Festival, where Martin was one of three actors, alongside Liane Balaban for New Waterford Girl and Karine Vanasse for Set Me Free (Emporte-moi), given special jury citations by the Canadian film jury for their performances.
