= Misayo Haruki =

Japanese actress

Misayo Karuki
- Born: June 28, 1974 (age 52); Japan
- Occupation: Actress
- Years active: 1994-present
- Notable work: Cure; Suicide Bus

Misayo Haruki (春木 みさよ, Haruki Misayo) (born June 28, 1974) is a Japanese actress.

== Filmography ==
=== Film ===
- Like a Rolling Stone (1994) - Yoko
- Zero Woman: Final Mission (1995) - Takako Fukuoka
- Cure (1997) - Tomoko Hanaoka
- Suicide Bus (1998) - Fukuda
- Keiho (1999) - Hatata Kei
- Ribbon (2021)

=== Television ===
- Pretty Guardian Sailor Moon (2003) - Alto Seminar lecturer
