= Chris William Martin =

Canadian actor (born 1975)

Chris William Martin Jr
- Born: Christopher William Martin Jr; January 17, 1975 (age 51); Burnaby, British Columbia, Canada
- Other name: Corky Martin
- Occupation: Actor
- Years active: 1991–present

Christopher William Martin Jr (born January 17, 1975), also known as Corky Martin or Chris Martin, is a Canadian actor. He has appeared on a number of television series, including Felicity,The L Word and The Vampire Diaries, as well as leading the 2002 Canadian series, Tom Stone.

== Early life ==
Martin was born in Burnaby, British Columbia, Canada, the son of Victoria Kathleen and Chris William Martin. He attended McRoberts Secondary School followed by Richmond High School in Richmond, British Columbia. He is also an alum of Ideal Mini School in Vancouver.

== Career ==
His first role was in the 1991 teen drama series Fifteen, filmed in Vancouver. His performance as Dylan received a nomination for Best Actor at the Youth in Film Awards. Notably, he also convinced his one-time Fifteen co-star, a young Ryan Reynolds, to give acting a second try at a time when he had given up on the career to focus on studies at Kwantlen Polytechnic University; the two then moved to Los Angeles together to further their career opportunities. After the end of the series, he played the role of Jamie Novak in the 1993 high school drama Madison, for which he received a Gemini Award nomination for Best Actor in a Drama Series at the 11th Gemini Awards in 1996.

In his early acting roles he was credited as just Chris Martin, but began going by Chris William Martin in the 2000s, likely to avoid potential confusion with musician Chris Martin of Coldplay.

In 1999, he starred in Carl Bessai's film Johnny, for which he won a special jury citation for his performance at the 1999 Toronto International Film Festival. He has gone on to work with Bessai on two subsequent films: Lola in 2001, and Emile in 2003. He appeared in the 2002 film Try Seventeen along with Elijah Wood and Mandy Moore, and played the title character in the drama series Tom Stone from 2002 to 2004.

Later, in 2004, he appeared as the main character in The Volcano Disaster. He has also appeared on several television series including Tru Calling, Intelligence, The Vampire Diaries, and Supernatural.

Apart from movies and television, he appeared in Alanis Morissette's music videos "Everything" and "Crazy".

== Filmography ==
=== Film ===
Year	Title	Role	Notes
1999	Johnny	Johnny	Also co-producer
2001	Lola	The Driver	
2002	All I Want	Steve	
2003	Emile	Carl	
2005	Nature Unleashed: Volcano	Russell Woods	
2007	Aliens vs. Predator: Requiem	Deputy Ray	
2008	Chaos Theory	Damon	
2015	The Age of Adaline	Dale Davenport	
2021	Demonic	Martin	

=== Television ===
Year	Title	Role	Notes
1991–1993	Fifteen	Dylan Blackwell	65 episodes
1992	Neon Rider	Ray	Episode: "Brothers"
1993	Family of Strangers	Young Jake	Television film
1993–1997	Madison	Jamie Novak	4 episodes
1994	Moment of Truth: To Walk Again	Dave	Television film
1994	Beyond Obsession	Arthur	Television film
1994	Moment of Truth: Broken Pledges	Scott Stevens	Television film
1994	Robin's Hoods	Tito	Episode: "The Pawn"
1995	Hawkeye	Tim Surrey	Episode: "The Escape"
1995	Beauty's Revenge	Jimmy Nolan	Television film
1996	Home Song	Robbie Gardner	Television film
1996	Susie Q	Ray Kovich	Television film
1996	Highlander: The Series	Carter Wellan	Episode: "The End of Innocence"
1996	Two	Hitchhiker	Episode: "No Man's Land"
1997	Dead Man's Gun	Richard Tyler	Episode: "The Highwayman"
1997	All the Winters That Have Been	Gabe	Television film
1998	Poltergeist: The Legacy	Elliot Black	Episode: "Metamorphosis"
1998	Someone to Love Me	Cowboy	Television film
1999	Dangerous Evidence: The Lori Jackson Story	Sergeant Martin	Television film
1999	Traders	Stash Roberts	Episode: "A Bitter Pill"
1999–2000	Amazon	Jimmy Stack	22 episodes
2000	Felicity	Greg Stenson	9 episodes
2000	Earth: Final Conflict	Richard Palmer	Episode: "Essence"
2001	Sanctuary	Brian Hathaway	Television film
2001	The Outer Limits	Gavin	Episode: "Time to Time"
2002–2004	Tom Stone	Tom Stone	26 episodes
2003	Burn: The Robert Wraight Story	Paramedic	Television film
2003	Hotel	Case	Television film
2004	Tru Calling	Justin Burke	Episode: "Murder in the Morgue"
2004	North Shore	Eli Manheim	Episode: "Burned"
2004	Revenge of the Middle-Aged Woman	Young Hal	Television film
2004	Veronica Mars	Josh	Episode: "Drinking the Kool-Aid"
2004	DeMarco Affairs	Peter Copeland	Television film
2005	The L Word	Hunter Kirby	4 episodes
2005	Intelligence	Damon Horvath	Episode: "Pilot"
2007	Shark	Ryan Stafford	Episode: "Blind Trust"
2007	Psych	J.P. Berger	Episode: "Poker? I Barely Know Her"
2007	Robson Arms	Perry Sound	Episode: "Misery Inc."
2007	Heartland	Dr. Simon Griffith	9 episodes
2007	Lincoln Heights	Dr. Cole	3 episodes
2007	CSI: Miami	Rich Caprioto	2 episodes
2007	NCIS	Brian Taylor	Episode: "Lost & Found"
2008	The Unquiet	Tom	Television film
2008	Bones	Garth Jodrey	Episode: "The Man in the Mud"
2008	The Terrorist Next Door	Pelletier	Television film
2008	The Mentalist	Trey Piller	Episode: "Flame Red"
2009	Dollhouse	Griff	Episode: "Epitaph One"
2009–2014	The Vampire Diaries	Zach Salvatore	5 episodes
2010	Huge	Jonathan	2 episodes
2010	Lone Star	Steve	Episode: "Unveiled"
2010	Terriers	Billy Whitman	Episode: "Sins of the Past"
2011	Look Again	Rick Palmer	Television film
2011	CSI: Crime Scene Investigation	Pilot Kirk Harmon	Episode: "CSI Down"
2013	Arctic Air	David	Episode: "Secrets & Lies"
2014–2015	Cedar Cove	Anthony	7 episodes
2015	Assassin Banana	Various	3 episodes
2015	Motive	Dr. Garrison Osgood	Episode: "Purgatory"
2016	When Calls the Heart	Jake Garrison	3 episodes
2016	I Didn't Kill My Sister	Mason Campbell	Television film
2016	Gourmet Detective	Steve	Episode: "Death Al Dente"
2018	Supernatural	Agent Clegg	Episode: "Breakdown"
2018	Colony	Roger	3 episodes
2018	Garage Sale Mystery	Jacques	Episode: "In D Minor"
2019	Death of a Cheerleader	Sheriff Randall	Television film
2019	Chronicle Mysteries	Chris Patterson	Episode: "Recovered"
2019	V.C. Andrews' Heaven	Luke Casteel	3 episodes
2020	Project Blue Book	Special Agent Stevens	Episode: "What Lies Beneath"
2021	Supergirl	Naxim Tork	2 episodes
