= Aburasoba =

Asian noodle dish

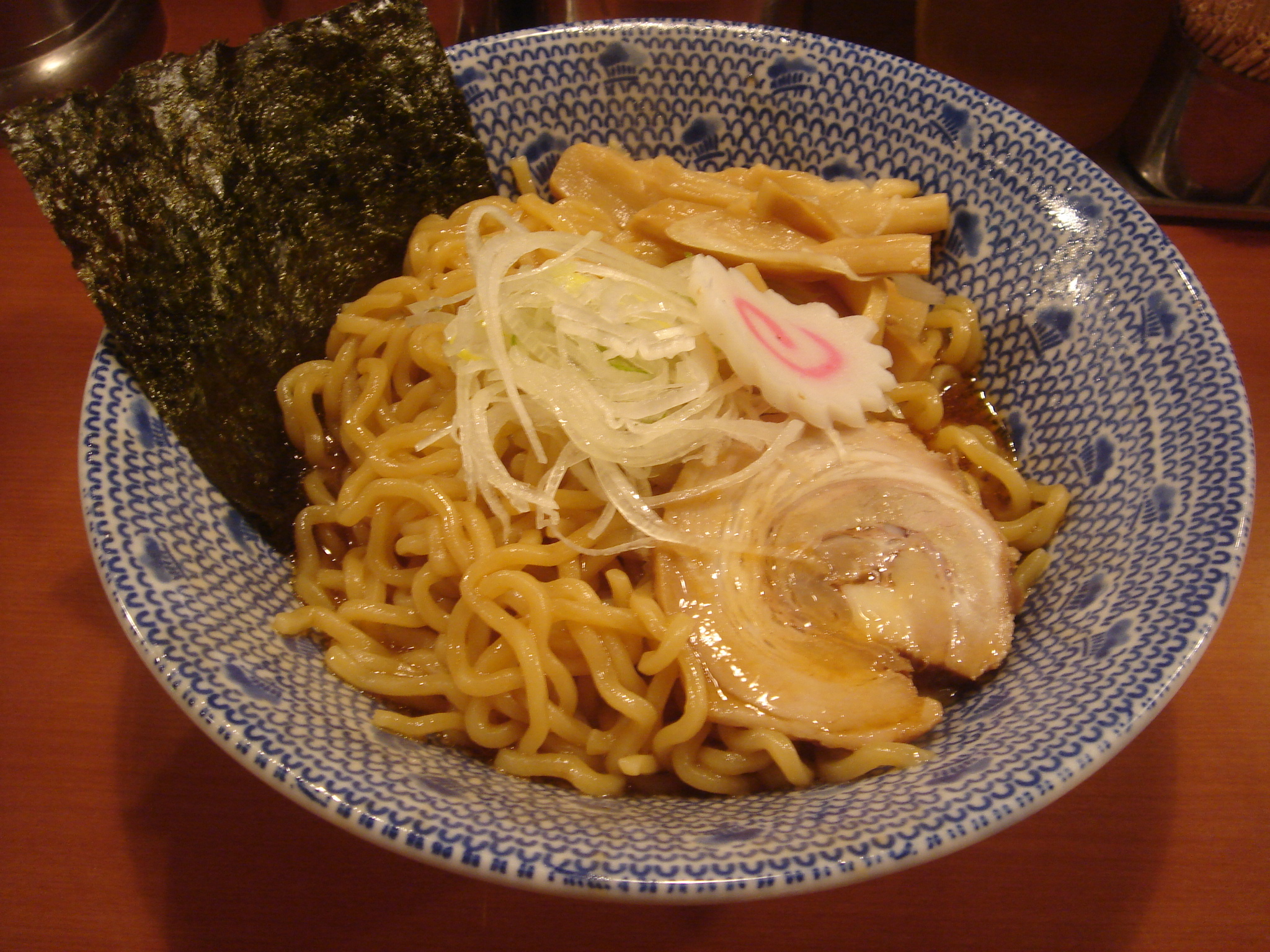
- Alternative names: abura soba, monjasoba, tenukisoba, abu ramen, shirunashi ramen
- Type: Noodle dish
- Place of origin: Japan
- Serving temperature: Hot
- Main ingredients: Chinese wheat noodles, meat- or fish-based sauce, vegetables or meat
- Variations: Many variants
- Similar dishes: Taiwan mazesoba

Aburasoba (油そば), also known as maze soba (Japanese: まぜそば, lit. 'mixed noodles'), monjasoba (もんじゃそば), tenukisoba (手抜きそば), abu ramen (あぶラーメン) or shirunashi ramen (汁なしラーメン), is a dry noodle dish made with a sauce of soy sauce and lard. Traditional ingredients include shoyu tare base, aroma oil, menma, shredded nori, and green onions. Other variations also include toppings like raw garlic, raw egg, cheese, and minced meat, which are mixed with the noodles before eating.

Mazesoba was introduced in the 1950s, with Chinchintei opening up in Musashino City in the 1950s. The largest aburasoba chain in the world is Kokoro Mazesoba.

== History ==
There are two theories about its origin: one is that Sanko, a restaurant near Hitotsubashi University in Kunitachi City, founded in 1952, started serving it as a snack with alcohol. They were likely inspired in the 1950s by soggy ramen noodles. The other theory is that Chinchintei, a restaurant near Asia University in the Musashino City district, started selling aburasoba in the 1950s. It became popular and ranked in the Shimbun list of Trending Products of the Year. In 2002, Myojo Foods launched the "Bubukka" oil-based instant noodles in Kichijoji, Musashino City.

=== Students and aburasoba ===
It is said that it became popular among students because of its relatively low price and large portions. According to Great Gidayu, after entering Asia University, a senior student took him to a restaurant that served aburasoba as a "rite of passage". Although he didn't think it tasted good at first, he became addicted after going there several times. Chinchintei sells noodles, soup, and more by mail order, but most of the orders are from alumni of Asia University. It has also become a specialty menu item at some student cafeterias.

== See also ==
- Japanese cuisine
- Shanghainese scallion oil noodles
