= Ikinai =

- Film poster
- japanese: 生きない
- Directed by: Hiroshi Shimizu
- Written by: Dankan
- Produced by: Masayuki Mori; Yasushi Tsuge; Takio Yoshida
- Starring: Dankan; Nanako Okouchi
- Cinematography: Katsumi Yanagishima
- Edited by: Yoshinori Ohta
- Music by: Maya
- Production company: Office Kitano
- Release date: 11 August 1998 (Japan)
- Running time: 101 minutes
- Country: Japan
- Language: Japanese

Ikinai (生きない, Ikinai) (transl. (I am) not living/alive/(I) will not live) (also known as Suicide Bus) is a 1998 Japanese comedy drama film directed by debutant Hiroshi Shimizu and starring Dankan and Nanako Okouchi.

The film is about a group of bus passengers on a trip in Okinawa who want to commit suicide so that their families will receive their life insurances payouts despite their own financial issues.

The film won awards at the Locarno Film Festival and at the Busan International Film Festival.

== Premise ==
Mitsuki, a young woman, receives from her uncle a bus ticket for a tour on the island of Okinawa. She joins the group and the trip. However all the other passengers have planned it only in order to kill themselves.

== Cast ==
- Dankan as Aragaki
- Nanako Okouchi as Mitsuki
- Toshinori Omi as Kimura
- Ippei Soda as Ozawa
- Yoichi Nukumizu as Yashiro
- Great Gidayū as Nose
- Hiroyuki Kishi as Mochizuki
- Takashi Mitsuhashi as Komatsu
- Mitsuo Togioka as Taguchi
- Misayo Haruki as Fukuda
- Ichirô Ogura as Kanda
- Tarō Ishida as Noguchi
- Takenori Murano as Itô

== Production ==
The film is Shimizu's directorial debut; he had been so far a long-time collaborator of Takeshi Kitano.

== Themes and influences ==
This film was found to offer an approach of the sensitive topic of suicide through humor and compassion.

== Reception ==
Peter Bradshaw of The Guardian wrote that "Hiroshi Shimizu is a debutant director, a former assistant to Takeshi Kitano, and his Ikinai is an unexpectedly moving essay on the nature of death" and that the film was "A very unsettling picture, arrestingly original, and possessed of a distinctive, seriocomic tone" Derek Elley of Variety wrote: "Neat idea of a dozen Japanese who hire a tour bus with the express purpose of committing communal suicide partly succeeds as a stylized, existential road movie, but an underdeveloped script leaves the viewer with too much time to ponder the story’s loose ends instead of being engrossed in the characters and ambience". Time Out found the film "fascinating".

== Remakes ==
The film was remade unofficially in India twice: in Telugu as Mee Sreyobhilashi (2007) and in Kannada as Lift Kodla (2010).
