= Just society =

Concept in social and political philosophy

A Just society is a normative phrase used to describe what a society "ought" to be. It generally appeals to notions of fairness, equality, and liberty. There is no single definition, and authors disagree about social organization to achieve it.

The idea of a just society first gained modern attention with 19th-century philosophers such as John Stuart Mill. In Canada the phrase was popularized by prime minister Pierre Trudeau to describe his fundamental principle that governed his policies, from multiculturalism to the creation of the Charter of Rights and Freedoms during the 1970s and '80s.

== History ==
The idea of a just society first gained modern attention when philosophers such as John Stuart Mill asked, "What is a 'just society'?" Their writings covered several perspectives including allowing individuals to live their lives as long as they didn't infringe on the rights to others, to the idea that the resources of society should be distributed to all, including those most deserving first. In 1861, John Stuart Mill published an essay entitled, "Utilitarianism". In this famous essay, Mill advocated the latter view, in which decision makers attended to the "common good" and all other citizens worked collectively to build communities and programs that would contribute to the good of others.

== Canadian usage ==
External videos
- – Pierre Trudeau declares 'Canada must be a just society' in 1968 – Sept. 9, 1968, CBC/Radio-Canada, (2:22 mins).

The term was used as a rhetorical device by Canadian prime minister Pierre Trudeau to encapsulate his vision for the nation. He first used the term in the 1968 Liberal Party leadership contest, at the height of "Trudeaumania", and it eventually became identified as one of his trademark phrases. The phrase is now an ingrained part of Canadian political discourse.

Unlike the "Great Society" of US President Lyndon B. Johnson, the label "Just Society" was not attached to a specific set of reforms, but rather applied to all Trudeau's policies, from multiculturalism to the creation of the Charter of Rights and Freedoms labelled Trudeauism.

In Canadian law, the notion of a "just society" is an ideal that is theoretically in the Constitution, particularly in Section 15 of the Canadian Charter of Rights and Freedoms, that promotes legal equality, fundamental freedoms, and the rule of law. The concept is also supported by the Criminal Code's sentencing objectives, which aim to maintain a just, peaceful, and safe society.

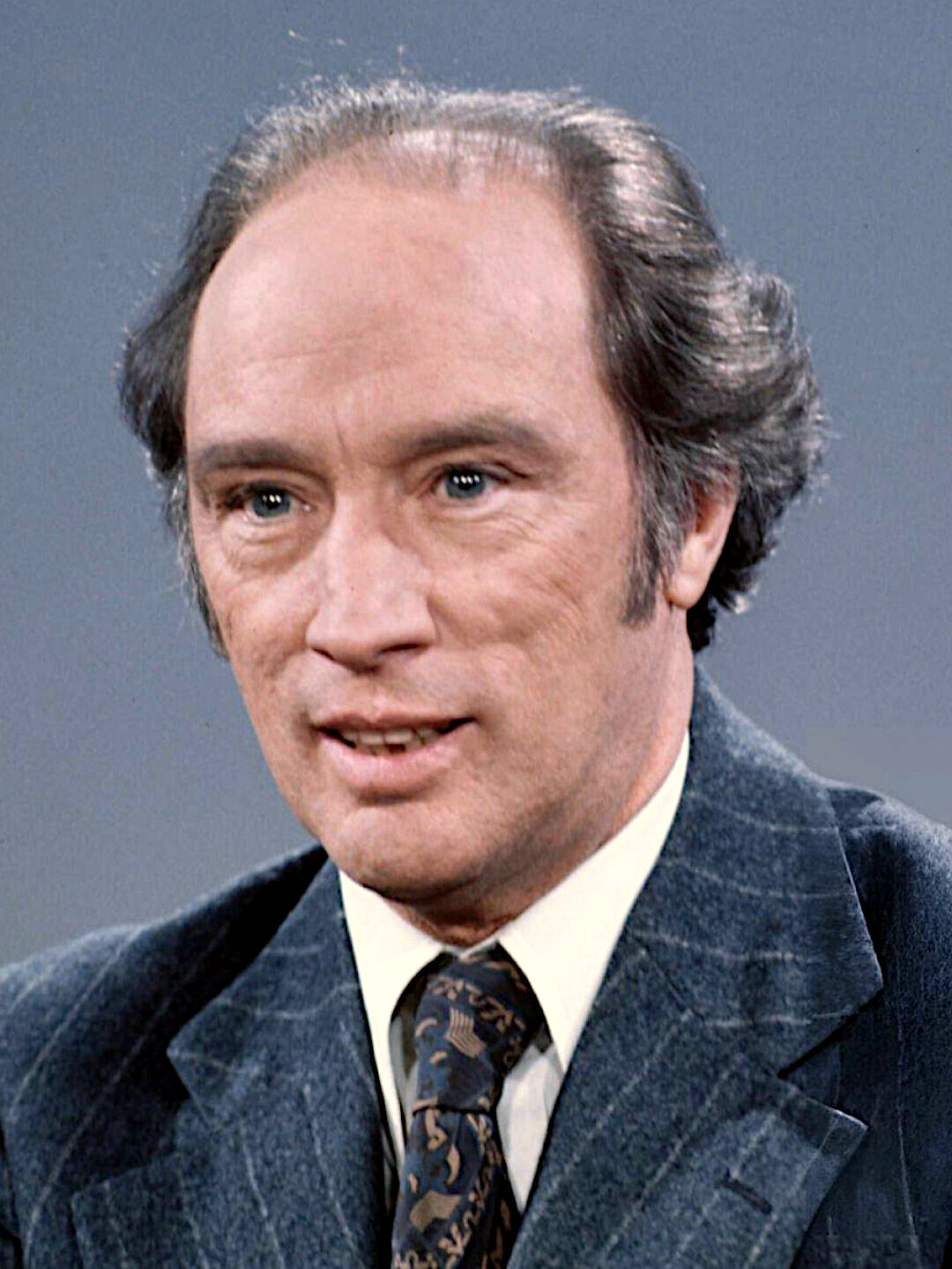
Pierre Trudeau, Prime Minister of Canada (1968–79, 1980–84)

Trudeau defined a just society prior to becoming the prime minister of Canada in 1968 as:

No one in the society should be entitled to superfluous or luxury goods until the essentials of life are made available to everyone. At first glance, that distribution would appear to obtain in Canada. Thanks to our abundant natural wealth and to the techniques of the industrial era, it no longer seems necessary to trample on one another in the scramble for riches. Consequently, most people take it for granted that every Canadian is assured a reasonable standard of living. Unfortunately, that is not the case.

... The Just Society will be one in which all of our people will have the means and the motivation to participate. The Just Society will be one in which personal and political freedom will be more securely ensured than it has ever been in the past. The Just Society will be one in which the rights of minorities will be safe from the whims of intolerant majorities. The Just Society will one in which those regions and groups which have not fully shared in the country’s affluence will be given a better opportunity. The Just Society will be one where such urban problems as housing and pollution will be attacked through the application of new knowledge and new techniques. The Just Society will be one in which our Indian and Inuit population will be encouraged to assume the full rights of citizenship through policies which will give them both greater responsibility for their own future and more meaningful equality of opportunity. The Just Society will be a united Canada, united because all of its citizens will be actively involved in the envelope of a country where equality of opportunity is ensured and individuals are permitted to fulfill themselves in the fashion they judge best.

... On the never-ending road to perfect justice we will, in other words, succeed in creating the most humane and compassionate society possible.

Trudeau himself later wrote in his Memoirs (1993) that "Canada itself" could now be defined as a "society where all people are equal and where they share some fundamental values based upon freedom", and that all Canadians could identify with the values of liberty and equality.

== Irish usage ==
Notable other users of the phrase have included Irish Taoiseach Liam Cosgrave of the Fine Gael party.

Declan Costello proposed the creation of a "Just Society" in the 1960s.

== See also ==
- Cultural mosaic
- Civil society
- Human rights
- "Justice as Fairness"
- Parallel society
- Social liberalism
- Unity in diversity
