= Just watch me =

Famous quote in Canadian politics by Pierre Trudeau

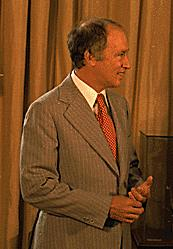
Former Canadian PM Pierre Trudeau

"Just watch me" is a phrase made infamous by Canadian Prime Minister Pierre Trudeau on October 13, 1970, during the October Crisis. The term is still regularly used in Canadian political discussion; Justin Trudeau, Pierre's son, has also used the phrase.

== Pierre Trudeau ==
Trudeau, who had in previous years been a strong proponent of civil liberties, said there was a need for drastic action to restore order in Quebec. When questioned by CBC reporter Tim Ralfe on how far he would go in the suspension of civil liberties to maintain order, Trudeau replied "Well, just watch me."

Three days later, he invoked the War Measures Act, which led to police action against many Quebec dissidents and great public controversy.

Just Watch Me: Trudeau and the '70s Generation is the title of a 1999 documentary by Catherine Annau. The phrase has also been the title of several biographies of Trudeau, e.g., Larry Zolf's Just Watch Me: Remembering Pierre Trudeau (1984); Ron Coleman's Just Watch Me: Trudeau's Tragic Legacy (2003); and the 2nd volume of John English's biography, Just Watch Me: The Life of Pierre Elliott Trudeau, 1968–2000 (2009).

=== Excerpt from interview ===
The following is a partial transcript of the impromptu interview between Tim Ralfe of the CBC and Trudeau.

Tim Ralfe: …what you're talking about to me is choices, and my choice is to live in a society that is free and democratic, which means that you don't have people with guns running around in it.

Pierre Trudeau: Correct.

Ralfe: And one of the things I have to give up for that choice is the fact that people like you may be kidnapped.

Trudeau: Sure, but this isn't my choice, obviously. You know, I think it is more important to get rid of those who are committing violence against the total society and those who are trying to run the government through a parallel power by establishing their authority by kidnapping and blackmail [The FLQ]. And I think it is our duty as a government to protect government officials and important people in our society against being used as tools in this blackmail. Now, you don't agree to this but I am sure that once again with hindsight, you would probably have found it preferable if Mr. Cross and Mr. Laporte had been protected from kidnapping, which they weren't because these steps we're taking now weren't taken. But even with your hindsight I don't see how you can deny that.

Ralfe: No, I still go back to the choice that you have to make in the kind of society that you live in.

Trudeau: Yeah, well there's a lot of bleeding hearts around who just don't like to see people with helmets and guns. All I can say is, go on and bleed, but it's more important to keep law and order in this society than to be worried about weak-kneed people who don't like the looks of a soldier's helmet.

Ralfe: At any cost? How far would you go with that? How far would you extend that?

Trudeau: Well, just watch me.

Ralfe: At reducing civil liberties? To that extent?

Trudeau: To what extent?

Ralfe: Well, if you extend this and you say, ok, you're going to do anything to protect them, does this include wire-tapping, reducing other civil liberties in some way?

Trudeau: Yes, I think the society must take every means at its disposal to defend itself against the emergence of a parallel power which defies the elected power in this country and I think that goes to any distance. So long as there is a power in here which is challenging the elected representative of the people I think that power must be stopped and I think it's only, I repeat, weak-kneed bleeding hearts who are afraid to take these measures.

== Justin Trudeau ==
In March 2013, Trudeau's son Justin, while running for the Liberal Party leadership, evoked his father's memory during his campaign by repeating this phrase. It was in answer to a fellow airplane passenger's question in a handwritten note, asking Justin if he could beat Conservative Prime Minister Stephen Harper. The comment sparked a frenzy on Twitter, as well as mixed reaction from several commentators, some of whom saw the quote as a politically sensitive and risky one in Quebec. Two years later, Justin Trudeau became Prime Minister of Canada, beating Harper in the 2015 federal election by a significant margin.

On September 12, 2021, Justin Trudeau said that NDP leader Jagmeet Singh could not go after Canada's wealthiest people with "unlimited zeal" in response to his party's campaign promise to tax the rich. Singh responded on Twitter with the line "Just watch me."

In response to the Freedom Convoy protests in 2022, some commentators called for Justin Trudeau to have a "just watch me" moment of his own. To deal with the protests, Trudeau later invoked the Emergencies Act, the successor to the War Measures Act, for the first time in Canadian history. He did not use the phrase.

== See also ==
- Trudeaumania
- Trudeauism
- Fuddle duddle
