= Albert Trueman =

Canadian academic (1902–1988)

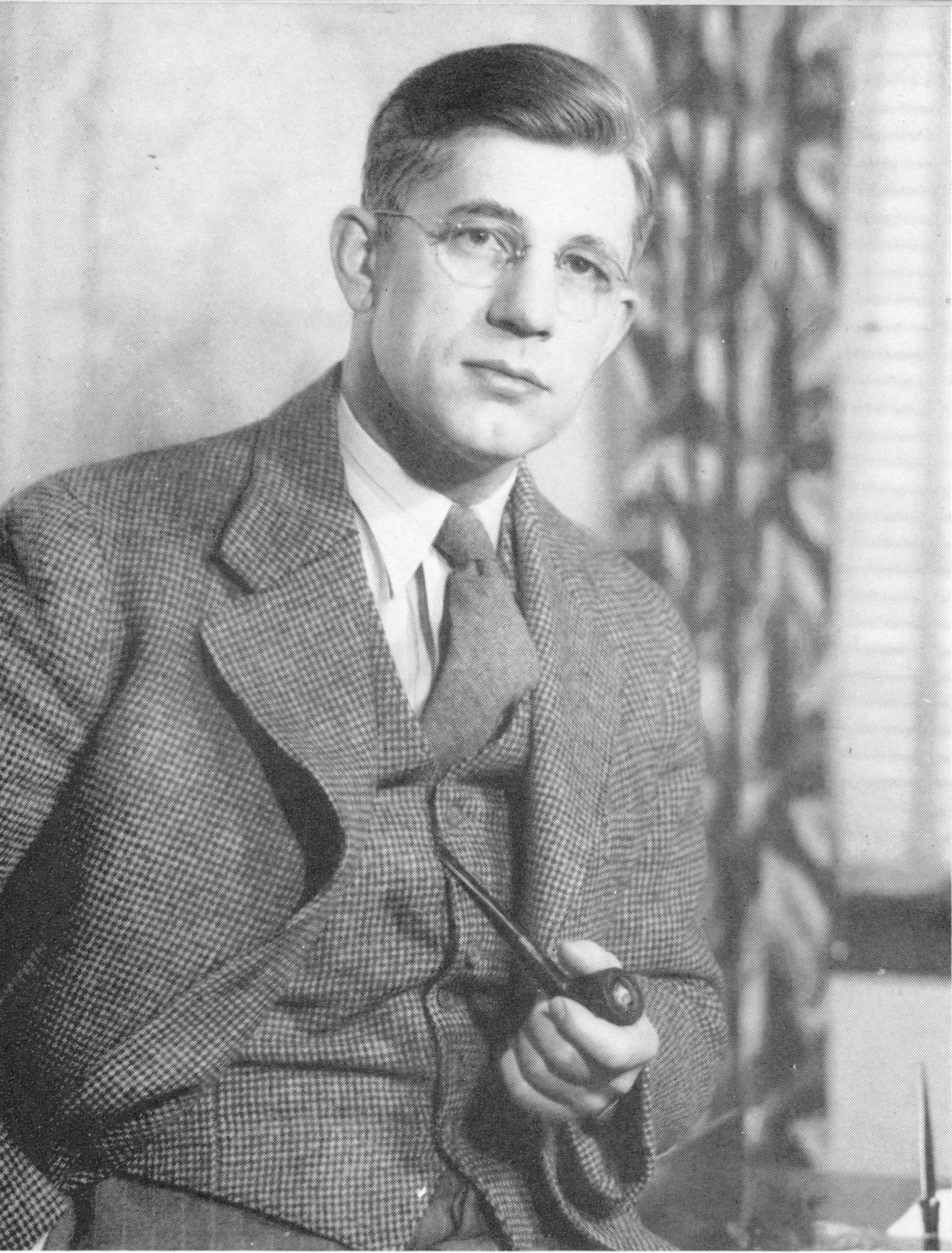
- Born: Albert William Trueman; January 17, 1902; Waverly, Pennsylvania
- Died: June 29, 1988 (aged 86); Toronto, Ontario, Canada
- Education: Mount Allison University, Oxford University
- Occupations: teacher, professor, cultural and university administrator
- Known for: National Film Board of Canada, Canada Council, University of Manitoba, University of New Brunswick, University of Western Ontario, Carleton University

Albert William Trueman, OC, FRSC (January 17, 1902 – June 29, 1988) was an American-born Canadian teacher, professor, cultural and university administrator.

== Early life ==
Trueman was born in the United States, where his New Brunswick-born father John Main Trueman taught at the University of Connecticut between 1907 and 1913. The family lived in Bible Hill, Nova Scotia after 1913, where his father taught at the Nova Scotia Agricultural College. Trueman attended high school in Truro, Nova Scotia and graduated from Mount Allison University in 1927. He finished his Master of Arts degree in English Literature at Exeter College, Oxford University in 1932.

== Career ==
Trueman was a high school teacher, and then became school superintendent in Saint John, New Brunswick. He later worked a university administrator, serving as President of the University of Manitoba between 1945 and 1948, and President of the University of New Brunswick from 1948 until 1953. He was principal and dean of University College at the University of Western Ontario from 1965 until 1967. He was chancellor of the University of Western Ontario from 1967 until 1971. He returned to academic life and had an extended term as visiting professor of English at Carleton University in Ottawa from 1967 to 1981.

Trueman acted as Government Film Commissioner and Chairman of the National Film Board of Canada from 1953 to 1957, and then as the first Director of the newly created Canada Council for the Arts, Humanities and Social Sciences, serving from 1957 to 1965. In these positions, he made contributions to Canadian cultural policies, primarily by promoting the roles and influence of both agencies. He also served on the Board of Governors of the Canadian Broadcasting Corporation (CBC).

Trueman was given many honorary degrees. He was a Fellow of the Royal Society of Canada since 1964, and was invested as an Officer of the Order of Canada in 1974.

Trueman wrote and edited several books, including A Second View of Things: A Memoir in 1982.

His son Peter Trueman, was a well-known television journalist.

== Publications ==
- Trueman, A. W. (1946). The Story of the United Empire Loyalists, Toronto, ON: Copp Clark Co.
- MacNutt, W. Stewart (1952), edited by A.W. Trueman. New Brunswick and Its People: The Biography of a Canadian Province , Fredericton, NB: New Brunswick Travel Bureau
- Trueman, A. W. (1952). Canada's University of New Brunswick: Its History and Its Development, New York & Montreal: Newcomen Society in North America.
- Trueman, A. W., Canadian Editor, with Wright, E.H. and Wright, M. H. (1957). Richards Topical Encyclopedia, New York, NY: Richards Company.
- Trueman, A. W., Davies, Robertson, Berton, Pierre; edited by D.C. Williams (1962). The Arts as Communication, Toronto, ON: University of Toronto Press.
- Trueman, A. W. (1963). The Canada Council and the Culture of the Country, Victoria, B.C.: University of Victoria
- Trueman, Albert (1982). A Second View of Things: A Memoir, Toronto, ON: McClelland & Stewart.ISBN 0-7710-8638-5

== Films ==
- The Maritimes: Traditions and Transitions (NFB short, 1959) on-screen presenter and narrator

Cultural offices
Preceded by William Arthur Irwin	Government Film Commissioner and Chairperson of the National Film Board of Canada; 1953-1957	Succeeded by Guy Roberge
