= Trudeauism =

Liberal ideology associated with Pierre Trudeau

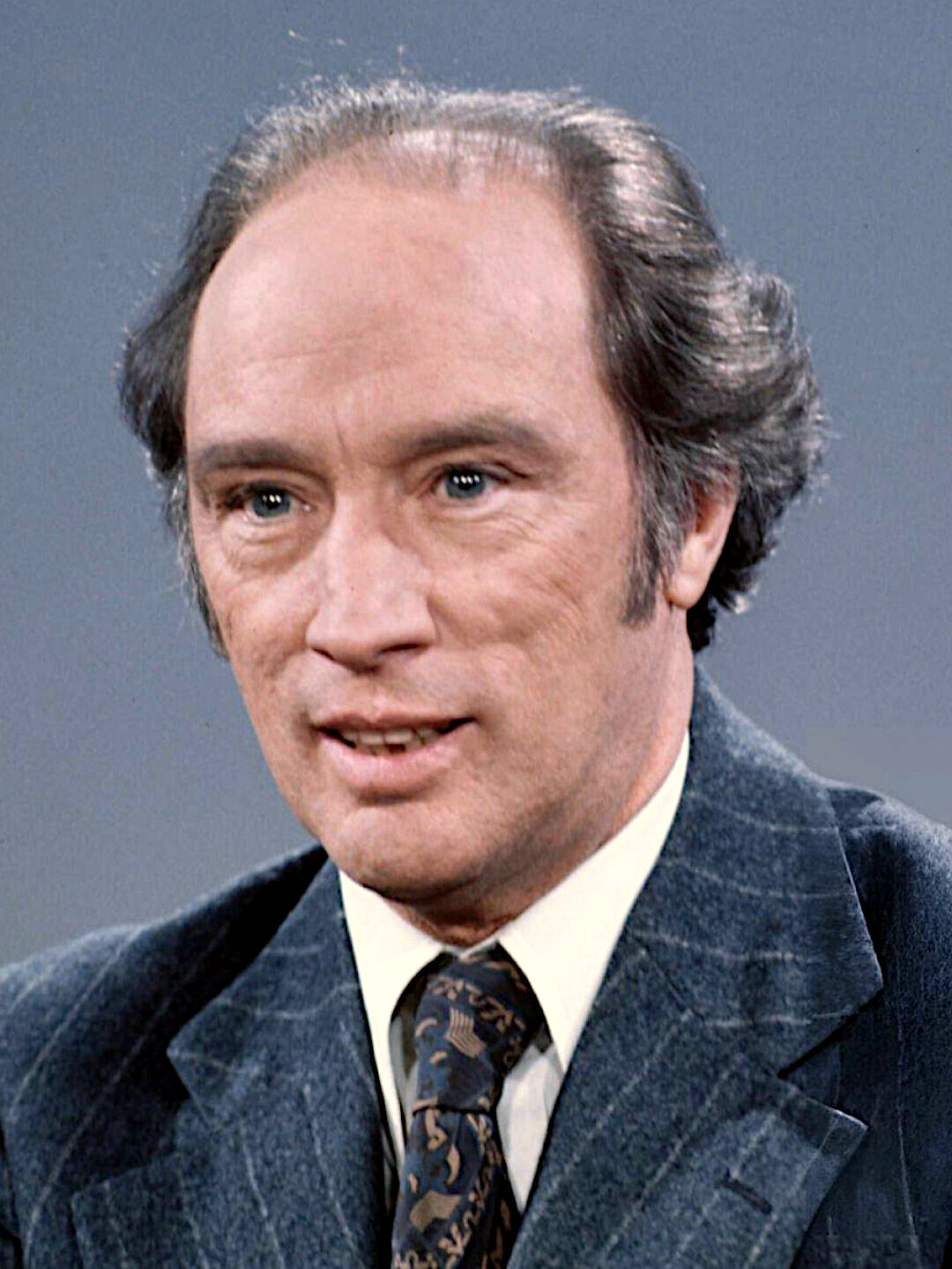
Pierre Trudeau, Prime Minister of Canada (1968–79, 1980–84)

Trudeauism refers to the liberal political ideology associated with former Liberal Party of Canada leader and Prime Minister of Canada Pierre Elliott Trudeau. Trudeauism involves social liberal/liberal-socialist, economic nationalist, Canadian nationalist, and centralist policies. Social justice is also an important principle of Trudeauism, with the ideology envisioning a just society. The term was later used in a different context to describe his son Justin Trudeau's policies and time as prime minister.

It is concerned with historical disenfranchisement for cultural and linguistic minorities in Canada, such as Francophones, and advocates of bilingualism and multiculturalism in Canada, though it opposes distinct society status for Quebec as advocated by some Canadian federalists. However, Pierre Trudeau's policies on First Nations affairs included the White Paper that controversially advocated the end of economic and political autonomy of First Nations within Canada that had been granted for centuries. The initiative failed and was later removed from the Trudeau government's agenda.

== Contrast with Laurier liberalism ==
Trudeauism, in contrast with the liberalism advocated by Prime Minister Wilfrid Laurier, places higher emphasis on equality and social justice, while Laurier liberalism emphasizes individualism and classical liberalism. Trudeauism also involves a more centralized federal government, resulting in policies like the National Energy Program. On the other hand, Laurier liberalism involves a more decentralized form of federalism.

== See also ==
- Fuddle duddle
- Just watch me
- Liberalism and nationalism
