= Jam Session (1999 film) =

Jam Session (ジャムセッション『菊次郎の夏』公式海賊版, Jamu Sesshon: Kikujirō no Natsu Kōshiki Kaizokuban) is a 1999 film directed by Makoto Shinozaki. It is a documentary of the making of Takeshi Kitano's film Kikujiro. It was produced and distributed by Office Kitano and was screened at the Rotterdam Film Festival and other festivals.
