= Tim Ralfe =

Canadian journalist (1938–2000)

- Born: 27 October 1938; Shanghai, China
- Died: 27 October 2000 (aged 62); Ottawa, Ontario, Canada
- Education: Carleton University
- Occupation: Television journalist
- Employer(s): CBC; CTV
- Known for: Historic interview with Pierre Trudeau

Tim Ralfe (27 October 1938 – 27 October 2000) was a Chinese-born Canadian television journalist for the Canadian Broadcasting Corporation who provoked a controversial moment in Canadian political history. During the October Crisis on 13 October 1970, Ralfe interviewed Prime Minister Pierre Trudeau and pointedly questioned Trudeau about the use of the military to protect cabinet ministers and senior officials, and the possible threat that it represented for civil liberties.

About five minutes into the interview, Trudeau stated: "Well, there are a lot of bleeding hearts around who just don't like to see people with helmets and guns. All I can say is, go on and bleed, but it is more important to keep law and order in the society than to be worried about weak-kneed people who don't like the looks of a soldier's helmet." Ralfe then asked how far Trudeau would go to deal with terrorists, and Trudeau famously responded, "Well, just watch me".

Ralfe's persistence was condemned by CBC managers who accused him of being too aggressive during a time of national crisis. Peter Trueman, executive producer of national television news wrote a message to Ralfe on an open, inter-office teleprinter link. It said that Ralfe's questioning of Trudeau violated every journalistic standard that Trueman had ever heard of. Trueman ordered severe cuts to the video tape to eliminate Ralfe's most argumentative questions. He also insisted that a formal reprimand to be placed on Ralfe's employment file. In his 1980 book, Trueman wrote that he regretted his actions.

Ralfe was a reporter for CTV when in 1973 he exploited a flaw in the House of Commons audio system used for simultaneous translation. He used it to record a New Democratic Party caucus meeting at Parliament Hill then played party leader David Lewis the audio tape. The report earned CTV a Michener Award the following year. Canadian law was later changed to further restrict such recordings.

Ralfe was born in Shanghai, China in 1938 and returned to Canada with his parents before the Japanese invaded China. Ralfe graduated from Bedford Park Public School and Lawrence Park Collegiate Institute, then to Carleton University for journalism.

He died on 27 October 2000, his 62nd birthday, in Ottawa, after suffering a heart attack two weeks before. He worked as a consultant at that time.
