= One Piece! (1999 film) =

Japanese film

- DVD cover
- Directed by: Shinobu Yaguchi; Takuji Suzuki
- Written by: Shinobu Yaguchi; Takuji Suzuki
- Starring: Yōji Tanaka; Nao Nekota; Satoru Jitsunashi; Masumi Kiuchi; Keiko Shionoya
- Cinematography: Shinobu Yaguchi; Takuji Suzuki
- Edited by: Shinobu Yaguchi; Takuji Suzuki
- Music by: Shinobu Yaguchi; Takuji Suzuki
- Production company: Pia Film Festival
- Release date: 20 September 1999 (Japan)
- Running time: 75 minutes
- Country: Japan
- Language: Japanese

One Piece! is a 1999 Japanese anthology film consisting of 14 comedy shorts by Shinobu Yaguchi and Takuji Suzuki. The shorts in the compilation, each ranging from two to seven minutes in length (and intended as "creative workouts" between Yaguchi's feature length projects), were shot over a period of five years in single, fixed takes with no editing, lights, sets or makeup, and were screened both at local and international film festivals.

== List of episodes ==
- "Friendship" (Yaguchi)
- "Oh! La, La" (Suzuki)
- "The Room" (Yaguchi)
- "Umbrella Man" (Suzuki)
- "The Incident" (Suzuki)
- "Let's Armageddon" (Suzuki)
- "Eros on the Run" (Yaguchi)
- "My Boyfriend" (Suzuki)
- "Who's the Director?" (Suzuki)
- "Miss Riverside" (Yaguchi)
- "Congratulations" (Yaguchi)
- "Cat Meow" (Yaguchi)
- "Sound of Teacher" (Suzuki)
- "Springtime" (Yaguchi)

== Cast ==
- Yōji Tanaka
- Nao Nekota
- Satoru Jitsunashi
- Masumi Kiuchi
- Keiko Shionoya
- Miako Tadano
- Yoko Chosokabe
- Tsurumi Komatsu
- Saori Sekiguchi
- Takuji Suzuki
- Naomi Nishida
- Kazuhiro Nakahara
- Junko Ueno
- Jason C. Kane as Saint Charloss (voice)
- Travis Mullenix as Additional characters (voice)

== Reception ==
Writing for the Toronto International Film Festival Program Guide in 1999, Noah Cowan stated that the film's individual segments were "truly bizarre and, often, very funny... Almost all are totally off-the-wall, their static, perfectly composed shots betraying nothing of what is to follow." However, he noted that "this is not just a series of cute shorts... We quickly realize that these guys not only have a complete command of Japanese youth vernacular but have also found the perfect method of exposing the fears and aspirations of young Japan's present and future." Cowan concluded by calling One Piece! a work of "demented genius", of the kind that "only comes along once in a very long while."

Derek Elley of Variety called the film "highly inventive" and "loopy", and said that its "deadpan, observant comedy deserves as warm a welcome as it received at its Toronto fest showings." Elley also stated that One Piece! "adds up to a sharp dissection of Japanese manners and society, though there's also an almost childlike charm and joy which prevents it from being bitter or morose."
