= Taiwan mazesoba =

Japanese noodle dish

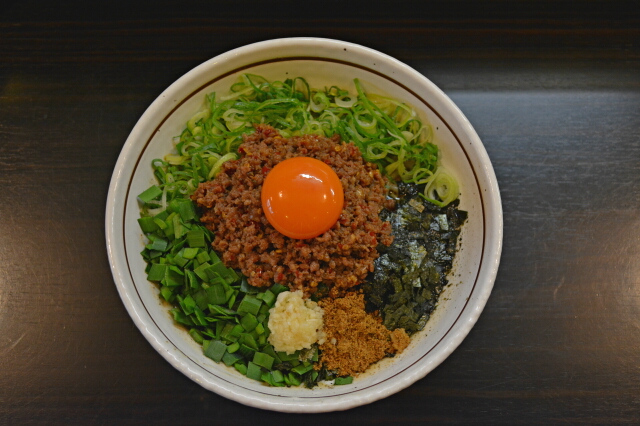
- Type: Noodle dish
- Place of origin: Japan
- Serving temperature: Hot
- Main ingredients: Chinese wheat noodles, meat- or fish-based sauce, vegetables or meat
- Variations: Many variants
- Similar dishes: Mazesoba

Taiwan mazesoba (Japanese: 台湾まぜそば, lit. 'Taiwan mixed noodles') is a dry noodle dish that originated in Nagoya, Aichi Prefecture, Japan, and is now considered a Nagoya delicacy. The dish was popularized by the ramen chain Menya Hanabi in 2008.

== See also ==
- Japanese cuisine
- Mazesoba
