= Kikujiro =

1999 Japanese film by Takeshi Kitano

- Japanese poster
- Directed by: Takeshi Kitano
- Written by: Takeshi Kitano
- Produced by: Shinji Komiya; Masayuki Mori; Takio Yoshida
- Starring: Takeshi Kitano; Yusuke Sekiguchi
- Cinematography: Katsumi Yanagishima
- Edited by: Takeshi Kitano; Yoshinori Ota
- Music by: Joe Hisaishi
- Production companies: Bandai Visual; Tokyo FM
- Distributed by: Nippon Herald Films; Office Kitano
- Release date: 5 June 1999
- Running time: 121 minutes
- Country: Japan
- Language: Japanese
- Box office: $200,920 (United States)

Kikujiro (Japanese: 菊次郎の夏, Hepburn: Kikujirō no Natsu; lit. Kikujirō's Summer) is a 1999 Japanese road drama film written, directed and co-edited by Takeshi Kitano, who also stars in the film with Yusuke Sekiguchi. Its score was composed by Joe Hisaishi. The film was entered into the 1999 Cannes Film Festival.

Kikujiro tells the story of a young boy searching for his mother during his summer vacation. The film is mostly divided into smaller chapters, listed as entries in the boy's summer vacation diary. Kitano's inspiration for the character (not the film) was his own father, Kikujiro Kitano, a gambler who struggled to feed his family and pay the rent.

Similar to his earlier works A Scene at the Sea and Getting Any?, Kitano references the yakuza only tangentially in Kikujiro, a departure from his work in crime dramas such as Sonatine and Hana-bi. Aimed at the whole family, the film was allegedly inspired by The Wizard of Oz with the basic premise being a road trip. Kitano's familiar elements and locales are present: drawings, vignettes, the seaside, and angels. Although the plot is composed largely of sad events, the film often has a light-hearted atmosphere, achieved mostly through Kitano's character and his somewhat bizarre encounters.

== Plot ==
Masao, a young boy, who lives alone with his grandmother in an old Shitamachi area of Tokyo, receives a package, and in looking for a seal finds a photo of his long lost mother. He finds her address in Toyohashi, several hundred miles to the west. Leaving home to see his mother, he meets his grandmother's neighbors, Kikujiro and his wife. Kikujiro's wife forces the sleazy, lazy and brash Kikujiro to accompany Masao on a journey to see his mother, telling Masao's grandmother that they are going to the beach.

At the start of their journey, Kikujiro is not serious about reaching Toyohashi. Instead he gets absorbed in track cycling races and gambles away all their money. Later, left outside a yakitori restaurant, Masao encounters a child molester. After a narrow escape, Kikujiro promises to keep to the journey and take Masao to his mother.

When the taxi Kikujiro steals breaks down, they are forced to hitchhike to Toyohashi, meeting various people along the way. They get lifts from a juggler and her boyfriend on a date, and a travelling poet who delivers them to Toyohashi. When they finally reach the address of Masao's mother, Kikujiro finds her living as a housewife with another man and their daughter, leaving Masao to tears. Kikujiro tries to console him by explaining that his mother had probably moved away. He tries to comfort Masao with a small blue bell shaped like an angel bullied from two bikers whom he happens to come across.

Masao is so disappointed that Kikujiro cannot help but try to brighten up their return trip to Tokyo. He tells him an angel will come at the sound of the bell.

They visit a summer matsuri held in a local Shinto shrine. While Kikujiro gets into trouble with some yakuza over a fixed shooting game, Masao dreams of dancing tengu.

Back on the road, they meet the poet and the two bikers again. They decide to camp a few days together. Masao enjoys playing some traditional games with them.

Kikujiro is reminded of his own mother (it is implied that she, like Masao's mother, also left him as a child). Kikujiro gets one of the bikers to take him from their camp to his mother's nursing home in Daito-cho, a small country town, but he eventually decides not to see her and returns to the camp.

The men continue to do their best to entertain Masao by larking about for a few more days. Before they are to return to Tokyo, Masao dreams about them appearing over the Milky Way. In the morning, the bikers say goodbye to them and leave the camp. Masao and Kikujiro get a lift in the poet's van to Tokyo. After dropping them off at a bridge, the poet continues on his way to Osaka and Kyūshū.

Before Masao and Kikujiro part, Kikujiro says, "Let's do it again sometime," and Masao thanks him. Kikujiro tells Masao to take care of his grandmother.

As Kikujiro turns to leave, Masao realizes that he doesn't know Kikujiro's name (he has been referring to him as "uncle" throughout the film) and asks him. Kikujiro answers, "Kikujiro! Now scram!", before the two part ways. Masao passes a small bridge with the angel bell ringing, mirroring the first shot of Masao at the start of the film.

== Cast ==
- Beat Takeshi as Kikujiro Takeda
- Kayoko Kishimoto as Kikujiro's Wife
- Yusuke Sekiguchi as Masao Sugiyama
- Yūko Daike as Satoko Sugiyama
- Kazuko Yoshiyuki as Masao's Grandmother
- Beat Kiyoshi as Man at the bus stop
- Great Gidayū as Biker
- Rakkyo Ide as Biker's Friend
- Nezumi Imamura as Travelling Man
- Fumie Hosokawa as Juggler
- Akaji Maro as Scary Man
- Daigaku Sekine as Yakuza Boss

== Themes ==
The film explores alienation and inclusion in Japanese society. The main characters, and those who help them along the way, are all considered outcasts from accepted social norms, not being part of a traditional family or group structure. Characters who maintain a more accepted lifestyle are frequently at odds with the protagonists.

Early in the film, the protagonists react to their alienation with anger (Kikujiro) and sadness (Masao). Along their journey, they start to discover how alike they are and the events in Toyohashi act as a turning point from which the characters begin to find comfort in their shared isolation.

== Soundtrack ==
Kikujiro's Summer
- Milan Records cover

Soundtrack album by Joe Hisaishi
- Released: 26 May 1999
- Genres: Stage & screen
- Labels: Milan Records 73138 35911-2; Polydor POCH 1788
- Producer: Joe Hisaishi

The album includes "Summer", one of the most famous compositions by Hisaishi; it was also re-arranged and used for Toyota Corolla commercials, for instance. These recordings can be found in his album Curved Music II.

1. "Summer" − 6:26
2. "Going Out" − 1:17
3. "Mad Summer" − 2:55
4. "Night Mare" − 1:49
5. "Kindness" − 1:57
6. "The Rain" − 5:38
7. "Real Eyes" − 3:16
8. "Angel Bell" − 3:12
9. "Two Hearts" − 2:01
10. "Mother" − 2:13
11. "River Side" − 6:13
12. "Summer Road" − 3:08

=== Credits ===
- Cello (solo) – Yumiko Morooka
- Composed by – Joe Hisaishi
- Executive producer – Emmanuel Chamboredon, Russell Ziecker
- Violin (solo) – Rieko Suzuki

== Reception ==
The film received mixed reviews. Kikujiro has a 61% approval rating on Rotten Tomatoes based on 51 reviews, with an average rating of 5.91/10 Metacritic assigned the film a weighted average score of 44 out of 100, based on 25 critics, indicating "mixed or average reviews".

== Documentary ==
Film director Makoto Shinozaki made a documentary of the making of Kikujiro entitled Jam Session (Jamu sesshon Kikujirō no natsu kōshiki kaizokuban). It was produced and distributed by Office Kitano and was screened at the Rotterdam Film Festival and other festivals.
