= The Making of a New Empire =

1999 film

The Making of a New Empire is a 95-minute documentary film by film director Jos de Putter and produced by Jura Films. The film portrays Khozh-Ahmed Noukhaev as the founder of a Moscow-based underground movement, which later became known as the Chechen mafia. The film explores Noukhaev's cultural background and his ideas about Chechenya's future. After its release in 1999, the film was nominated for the Golden Calf for best long documentary and was selected for the competition programs of several leading documentary film festivals across the globe, including Hot Docs and IDFA.
