= Adrenaline Drive =

- Film poster
- Directed by: Shinobu Yaguchi
- Written by: Shinobu Yaguchi
- Produced by: Kiyoshi Mizokami
- Starring: Masanobu Andō; Hikari Ishida; Tomoharu Hasegawa; Yutaka Matsushige
- Cinematography: Takeshi Hamada
- Edited by: Shinobu Yaguchi
- Music by: Seiichi Yamamoto
- Production companies: Adrenaline Drive Committee; Kindai Eiga Kyōkai
- Release date: June 12, 1999 (Japan)
- Running time: 111 minutes
- Country: Japan
- Language: Japanese

Adrenaline Drive (Japanese: アドレナリン・ドライブ, Hepburn: Adorenarin doraibu) is a 1999 Japanese comedy film directed by Shinobu Yaguchi.

== Plot ==
A young milquetoast car rental company driver named Satoru Suzuki (Masanobu Ando) and a mousy nurse named Shizuko Sato (Hikari Ishida) are both in dire need of a confidence boost. Through a string of unbelievable events they meet and then fall into a wealth of yakuza money. They are chased by the monstrous yakuza as well as his stooge like young henchmen.

== Cast ==
- Masanobu Andō as Satoru Suzuki
- Hikari Ishida as Shizuko Sato
- Tomoharu Hasegawa as Kawakami
- Yutaka Matsushige as Kuroiwa
- Yu Tokui as Yamamoto
- Yōji Tanaka as Bus Driver
- Takuji Suzuki as Hosoya
- Tarō Suwa as Shimada
- Koichi Ueda as Arakawa
- Tadashi Sakata as Tanaka
- Shinji Rokkaku as Ueno
- Kazue Tsunogae as Head Nurse
- Kanta Ogata as Police Officer
- Yoshitaka Ōtsuka as Yankee
- Akira Saito as Paramedic
- Kirina Mano as Nurse

== Release ==
Adrenaline Drive was released in Japan in 1999 and was shown at the 1999 Toronto International Film Festival. It received a limited release in the United States on May 5, 2000. The film grossed a total of $77,313 on its American wide release.

== Reception ==
Adrenaline Drive was well received by Western critics on its initial release. The film ranking website Rotten Tomatoes reported that 76% of critics had given the film positive reviews, based upon a sample of 21. At Metacritic, which assigns a normalized rating out of 100 to reviews from mainstream critics, the film has received an average score of 69, based on 24 reviews.
