= Liberalism in Canada =

Liberalism has been a major trend in Canadian politics since the late 18th century. Canada has the same features of other liberal democracies in the Western democratic political tradition. This article gives an overview of liberalism in Canada. It includes a brief history of liberal parties with substantial representation in parliament.

== Liberal parties ==
Liberal parties developed in both the French and English speaking parts of Canada; these developments led to the formation of the Liberal Party of Canada. Liberal parties exist on a provincial level; however, while they mostly share similar ideologies, not all provincial parties are officially affiliated with the federal party.

In Canada, a "capital-L" Liberal refers to the policies and ideas of the Liberal Party of Canada/Parti Libéral du Canada (LI member), the most frequent governing party of Canada for the last century and one of the largest liberal parties around the world. The Quebec Liberal Party (Parti libéral du Québec) combines liberalism with more conservative ideas. Only federal parties are included in the following timeline. For inclusion in this scheme, it is not necessary for parties to have explicitly labelled themselves as a liberal party.

In 2023, The Saskatchewan Liberal Party changed its name to the Saskatchewan Progress Party, in the same year the British Columbia Liberal Party changed its name to BC United.

=== Timeline of the federal Liberal Party ===
==== Canadian Party / Patriot Party / Red Party ====
- 1806: Liberals in the Francophone part of Canada formed the Parti canadien
- 1826: The party is renamed Parti patriote and is led by Louis-Joseph Papineau
- 1848: The party is further reorganised into the Parti rouge
- 1867: The PR merged into the present-day Liberal Party of Canada

==== Reform Party ====
- 1841: The Upper Canada Reform Party is formed
- 1855: Radical members formed the Clear Grits.
- 1867: The Reform Party merged into Liberal Party of Canada

==== Clear Grits / Liberal Party of Canada ====
- 1855: Radical members of the Reform Party formed the Clear Grits
- 1867: The Clear Grits merged with the Reform Party, the Red Party and provincial liberal parties into the present-day Liberal Party of Canada

=== Current parties ===
In addition to the federal party, each province and the Yukon territory has or has had its own Liberal Party; however, only those in the Atlantic Provinces are formally affiliated with the federal party. The territories of Nunavut and Northwest Territories do not have a Liberal Party, as political parties are not recognized under their system of consensus government.

Federal, provincial and territorial Liberal parties
Federal party		Last election	Seats/Total	Status	Leader
Liberal Party of Canada		2025	173/343 (House); 0/105 (Senate)	Governing	Mark Carney, Prime Minister of Canada
Affiliated parties		Last election	Seats/Total	Status	Leader
New Brunswick Liberal Association		2024	31/49	Governing	Susan Holt, Premier of New Brunswick
Liberal Party of Newfoundland and Labrador		2025	15/40	Official Opposition	John Hogan
Nova Scotia Liberal Party		2024	3/55	Third party	Iain Rankin (interim)
Prince Edward Island Liberal Party		2023	4/27	Official Opposition	Hal Perry (interim)
Unaffiliated parties	Affiliation ended	Last election	Seats/Total	Status	Leader
Ontario Liberal Party	1976	2025	14/124	Third party	John Fraser (interim)
Quebec Liberal Party	1955	2026	39/127	Official Opposition	Charles Milliard
Yukon Liberal Party		2025	1/21	Third party	Debra-Leigh Reti (interim)
Manitoba Liberal Party		2023	1/57	Third party	Willard Reaves
Alberta Liberal Party	1987	2023	0/87	No seats	John Roggeveen

==== Former parties ====
Name	Affiliation ended	Details
Northwest Territories Liberal Party	1905	No longer any recognized political parties due to consensus government.
British Columbia Liberal Party	1987	Changed its name to BC United in 2023 and replaced their colours with teal and pink representing both conservatives and liberals.
Saskatchewan Liberal Party	2009	Changed its name to Saskatchewan Progress Party in 2023 and replaced the colours to red, blue and yellow.

== Liberal leaders ==
=== Parti Patriote ===
- Louis-Joseph Papineau

=== Clear Grits ===
- George Brown

=== Parti Rouge ===
- Antoine-Aimé Dorion

=== Liberal Party of Canada ===
- Alexander Mackenzie
- Edward Blake
- Wilfrid Laurier
- Daniel Duncan McKenzie
- William Lyon Mackenzie King
- Louis St. Laurent
- Lester Bowles Pearson
- Pierre Elliott Trudeau
- John Turner
- Jean Chrétien
- Paul Martin
- Bill Graham
- Stéphane Dion
- Michael Ignatieff
- Bob Rae
- Justin Trudeau
- Mark Carney

== Liberal thinkers ==
- Mario Bunge - Argentinian-Canadian professor of philosophy.
- Michael Ignatieff - political philosopher and former leader of the federal Liberal Party.
- Will Kymlicka - Canadian liberal thinker included in Contributions to liberal theory
- Jan Narveson - Canadian political philosopher and defender of libertarianism, or classical liberalism, currently Emeritus Professor of Philosophy, University of Waterloo

== See also ==
- Blue Grit
- Trudeauism
- Conservatism in Canada
- Socialism in Canada
- Republicanism in Canada
- History of Canada
- Politics of Canada
