= Starship Captain =

Starship Captain is a 1982 board game published by Standard Games and Publications / Jeux Rexton.

== Gameplay ==
Starship Captain is a game in which a tactical space combat board game features hex maps, cardstock ships, scenario-driven rules, and turn-based play where ship speed determines movement order and victory points are earned by damaging or destroying opponents.

== Reviews ==
- Casus Belli #36 (as "Capitaine Cosmos")
- Jeux & Stratégie #44 (as "Capitaine Cosmos")
