= Cure (film) =

- Theatrical release poster
- Directed by: Kiyoshi Kurosawa
- Written by: Kiyoshi Kurosawa
- Produced by: Junyuki Shimoba; Tsutomu Tsuchikawa
- Starring: Koji Yakusho; Tsuyoshi Ujiki; Anna Nakagawa; Masato Hagiwara
- Cinematography: Tokushô Kikumura
- Edited by: Kan Suzuki
- Music by: Gary Ashiya
- Production company: Daiei Film
- Distributed by: Shochiku-Fuji Company
- Release dates: 6 November 1997 (Tokyo); 27 December 1997 (Japan)
- Running time: 112 minutes
- Country: Japan
- Language: Japanese

Cure (Japanese: キュア, Hepburn: Kyua) is a 1997 Japanese psychological horror thriller film written and directed by Kiyoshi Kurosawa. Starring Koji Yakusho and Masato Hagiwara, it follows a detective investigating a series of murders whose perpetrators all confess under strange circumstances, seemingly being driven to kill by an unknown force. As the story develops, the police realise all the murderers are in contact with a mysterious young man, who appears to have extreme memory loss. The film received positive reviews from critics and has been described in later commentary as influential on the late-1990s wave of Japanese horror cinema.

Originally entitled Evangelist (伝道師, Dendoushi), the film's name was changed due to the Tokyo subway sarin attack perpetrated by Aum Shinrikyo that happened while the film was in production. To avoid suggesting a religious cult connection to the crimes in the story, it was retitled Cure at the suggestion of a Daiei Film producer.

The film premiered at the Tokyo International Film Festival on 6 November 1997, and released in Japan by Shochiku-Fuji Company on 27 December. It received widespread positive reviews from critics, and is considered a progenitor of the explosion of Japanese horror media in the late 1990s and early 2000s, preceding other releases like Hideo Nakata's Ring and Takashi Shimizu's Ju-On.

== Plot ==
Kenichi Takabe, a Tokyo Metropolitan Police detective, is involved in the investigation of a bizarre series of violent killings by seemingly random perpetrators. In each case, the murderers have been caught close to the scene of the crime, and the victim is found with a large "X" carved into their neck or chest. Although all of the perpetrators readily confess and remember their deeds, none seem to have substantial motives or explanations for their actions. Takabe is at a loss for answers, and his private life begins to falter, as his wife Fumie suffers from phases of schizophrenia and frequently gets lost in their neighborhood.

Takabe and his colleague, forensic psychologist Shin Sakuma, eventually identify a common thread connecting the murders - each killer, shortly before the killing, came in contact with a man named Kunihiko Mamiya. Mamiya appears to have extreme short-term memory loss and claims to recall nothing of his past. Searching through Mamiya's belongings, Takabe and Sakuma discover that Mamiya used to study psychology, specifically mesmerism and hypnosis. Takabe suspects that Mamiya has no memory problems at all and is actually a master of hypnosis capable of planting homicidal suggestions in strangers' minds by exposing them to repetitive sounds or sights, such as the motion of water or the flame of a lighter. In custody, Mamiya constantly evades Takabe's questions, instead asking about Takabe's private life until Takabe eventually lashes out, shouting his resentment for Fumie while Mamiya looks on in amusement. Takabe has Mamiya charged with incitement to murder. Takabe also experiences a vision of Fumie hanging herself, and later he commits her to a mental hospital.

Sakuma shows Takabe a videotape featuring a mysterious man speculated to be Suejiro Bakuro, the originator of Japanese mesmerism in Mamiya's mesmerism literature. In the video, a female subject is hypnotized by the man, who gestures an "X" in midair. This woman later killed her son in a manner similar to the crimes they are investigating. Sakuma believes the crimes have a connection to the past, and describes Mamiya as a missionary inciting others to commit ceremonial murders. Subsequently, Sakuma unconsciously draws an X in black paint on his wall and starts to experience hallucinations of Takabe menacingly cornering him. Several days later, the police discover Sakuma's body handcuffed to a pipe in his home and conclude that he committed suicide.

Mamiya escapes from prison, killing a policeman in the process. Takabe tracks him to a deserted building and shoots him in the chest. Before dying, Mamiya draws an X in the air in front of Takabe. Despite Takabe's threats, Mamiya continues speaking evasively, causing Takabe to shoot him in the head and chest several times in a rage, killing him.

Exploring the building, Takabe finds and plays an old phonograph cylinder containing a recording of a male voice, thought to be that of Bakuro, repeating what seem to be hypnotic instructions. Shortly after, Fumie's already decomposed corpse is found by a nurse, with an "X" savagely carved into her throat.

In a restaurant, a waitress serves coffee for Takabe, walks away, is whispered to by several staff members, and silently draws a knife.

== Cast ==
- Koji Yakusho as Kenichi Takabe
- Masato Hagiwara as Kunihiko Mamiya
- Tsuyoshi Ujiki as Shin Sakuma
- Anna Nakagawa as Fumie Takabe, Kenichi's wife
- Yoriko Dōguchi as Dr. Akiko Miyajima
- Yukijirō Hotaru as Ichiro Kuwano
- Denden as Oida
- Ren Osugi as Fujiwara
- Masahiro Toda as Tōru Hanaoka
- Misayo Haruki as Tomoko Hanaoka
- Shun Nakayama as Kimura
- Akira Otaka as Yasukawa
- Shôgo Suzuki as Tamura
- Touji Kawahigashi as Psychiatrist
- Hajime Tanimoto as Police Supervisor

== Release ==
Cure premiered on 6 November 1997 at the Tokyo International Film Festival. It was later released theatrically in Japan on 27 December 1997 by Shochiku-Fuji Company. It screened at the San Francisco International Film Festival on 25 April 1998 and at the Toronto International Film Festival in 1999 as part of a Kurosawa retrospective before receiving a U.S. theatrical release in 2001.

The film was released on home video for the first time in the UK as part of The Masters of Cinema Series on April 23, 2018. The Criterion Collection released the film on Blu-ray in the United States on October 18, 2022.

== Reception ==
On the review aggregator website Rotten Tomatoes, Cure has a 94% approval rating based on 63 reviews, with an average score of 7.5/10. The site's critical consensus reads: "Mesmerizing and psychologically intriguing." Metacritic, which uses a weighted average, assigned the film a score of 70 out of 100, based on 13 critics, indicating "generally favorable" reviews.

Tom Mes of Midnight Eye described the film as "a horror film in the purest sense of the word". Meanwhile, A. O. Scott of The New York Times noted that Kiyoshi Kurosawa "turns the thriller into a vehicle for gloomy social criticism." Scott Tobias of The A.V. Club said: "Kurosawa, a prolific genre stylist who specializes in low-key thrillers and horror films, undercuts the lurid material by keeping a chilly, almost clinical distance from the events and unfolding the story in elliptical pieces." For Screen Slate, Stephanie Monohan wrote: "Arguably overshadowed by other films in the turn-of-the-century J-Horror canon like Ringu (1998) and Audition (1999), Cure lives on as one of the more powerful works of the era."

Kurosawa, speaking about the success of Cure, stated: "I watched a lot of American horror movies growing up, and I had wanted to make a movie in that genre for some years. Then the growth in popularity of genre films made it easier for me to get the project financed and produced. So, the circumstance was the key factor to the success of Cure, and it has continued to play an important role in my career ever since."

=== Legacy and influence ===
In the 2012 Sight & Sound Directors’ Poll, filmmaker Bong Joon-ho listed Cure among his ten greatest films of all time. The film is frequently cited in accounts of the late-1990s emergence of “J-horror,” with Kurosawa himself discussing how Cure fits within that cycle in interviews for the documentary The J-Horror Virus (2024).

When discussing films in The Criterion Collection, filmmaker Ari Aster praised the film, saying, “There’s a good case to be made that Cure by Kiyoshi Kurosawa is the best movie ever made”.

== Sources ==
- Clark, Jason. "Cure (1997)". AllMovie. Archived from the original on April 21, 2015.
- Gerow, Aaron (December 25, 1997). "Cure*". The Daily Yomiuri. p. 9. Archived from the original on May 9, 2015.
- Harris, Dana (November 13, 2002). "UA Sure 'Cure' Will Redo". Variety.
- Murguia, Salvador Jimenez, ed. (2016). The Encyclopedia of Japanese Horror Films. Rowman & Littlefield. ISBN 978-1442261679.
