= Makoto Shinozaki =

Japanese film director (born 1963)

- Born: 1963 (age 62–63); Tokyo, Japan
- Occupation: Film director

Makoto Shinozaki (篠崎 誠, Shinozaki Makoto) (born 1963 in Tokyo) is a Japanese film director.

== Career ==
Born in Tokyo, Shinozaki attended Rikkyo University, where he studied under Shigehiko Hasumi, made 8mm films, and appeared in the then amateur works of other Rikkyo graduates such as Kiyoshi Kurosawa. After graduating, he worked at the film company Cine Saison and starting writing about film and doing long interviews of directors such as Quentin Tarantino and Takeshi Kitano for magazines. While working as a projectionist for the Athénée Français Cultural Center in Tokyo, he saved up enough money to make his first 35mm film, Okaeri, for which he won the Wolfgang Staudte Award at the Berlin Film Festival in 1995. His next feature film, Not Forgotten, was screened at the Three Continents Film Festival, where its stars, Tomio Aoki, Tatsuya Mihashi, and Minoru Ōki, shared the best actor award. Having developed a close relationship with Takeshi Kitano, Shinozaki has made a documentary on the filming of Kikujiro as well as a TV movie based on Kitano's autobiographical novel Asakusa Kid. He has also produced the Cop Festival series featuring short films by directors such as Kiyoshi Kurosawa, Shinji Aoyama, Akihiko Shiota, and Hirokazu Koreeda. Continuing to write on film, he has published a history of horror cinema with Kiyoshi Kurosawa.

Shinozaki continues to direct films while also serving as professor in the Department of Expression Studies of the College of Contemporary Psychology at Rikkyo University. His drama film, Since Then, premiered at the Tokyo International Film Festival in 2012.

== Filmography ==
=== Feature films ===
- Okaeri (1995) aka Welcome Home
- Not Forgotten (2000)
- Walking With the Dog (2003)
- 0093 (2007)
- Tokyo Island (2010)
- Kaiki: Tales of Terror from Tokyo (2010)
- Die! Directors, Die! (2011)
- Since Then (2012)
- Sharing (2014)

=== Fiction short films ===
- Masters of Killing (2006)

=== Documentary films ===
- Jam Session (1999)

=== Television ===
- Asakusa Kid (2002)
