= Battle Damage: Code Red =

Battle Damage: Code Red is a 1982 expansion for Star Fleet Battles published by Task Force Games.

== Gameplay ==
Battle Damage: Code Red is a supplement that presents a card-dealing system as a way to allocate damage quickly to various starship systems.

== Reception ==
Andy Davis reviewed Battle Damage: Code Red in The Space Gamer No. 60. Davis commented that "I can only recommend Battle Damage: Code Red to those players who want a slight change of pace and have [the money] to spare. For the price I paid, t was less than satisfactory."
