= Great Gidayū =

Japanese actor (1958–2026)

- グレート義太夫
- Born: Masayuki Suzuki; 26 December 1958; Itabashi, Tokyo, Japan
- Died: 7 September 2026 (aged 67)
- Education: Asia University (no degree)
- Occupations: Comedian, actor
- Years active: 1982–2026

Masayuki Suzuki (Japanese: 鈴木 正之, Suzuki Masayuki; 26 December 1958 – 7 September 2026), better known by the stage name Great Gidayū (グレート義太夫, Gurēto Gidayū), was a Japanese comedian and actor. He notably played Biker in the 1999 film Kikujiro.

Gidayū died on 7 September 2026, at the age of 67.

== Filmography ==
- Ikinai (1998)
- Kikujiro (1999)
- Goodbye, Bad Magazines (2022)
