= Wizards (board game) =

Fantasy board game

- Designers: Thomas Mosbø and Coral Mosbø
- Illustrators: Coral Mosbø
- Publishers: Avalon Hill
- Years active: 1982 – c. 1993
- Players: 1 to 6

Wizards is a fantasy board game designed by Thomas Mosbø and Coral Mosbø.

== Story ==
Wizards is a game of high fantasy in the "Enchanted Isles" for 2-6 players. The players each take the role of a druid, a wizard, or a sorcerer (who get their power from the dragons), and they must work together against the "Evil Spirit". It is both a co-operative game and a competitive game: If the players together are unable to thwart the Evil Spirit, everyone loses; but if one player is able to complete enough "Tasks" and collect the "Sacred Gems" in time, that player alone wins the game.

== Gameplay ==
The board represents the sea. Eighteen equally-sized hexagonal islands are placed randomly on the board. Each player tries to advance his or her character through four levels of power by completing quests (called "Tasks"), which involves travelling to several different islands. Each game turn represents a day; if the players collectively have not completed ten tasks at the end of fourteen days, then the Evil Spirit attacks the islands, which usually choosing one of the islands at random and turning it over, removing it from play. Any quests that required travel to that island are now impossible to complete. If one particular tile, the Sacred Circle, is removed, the game is lost.

Players who have advanced their characters to fourth level no longer need to complete tasks, but instead start collecting Sacred Gems from six High Wizards. There is also a False Wizard, who works against the players. If a player can collect the six different gems without having them stolen by the False Wizard, the player can move toward the center of the Sacred Circle. If he reaches that goal, Rüktal the Druid High Priest, can cast the Spell of Spells to defeat the Evil Spirit, and the player wins the game.

The game components are a hex board representing the sea, eighteen island tiles, markers for the five wizards, and counters for boats and other objects, and turn markers.

== Reception ==
In the September 1983 issue of White Dwarf, Jim Bambra admired the artwork and the language of the rules, saying, "The beautiful artwork in pastel shades on the box cover is mirrored by the Beautiful and Exotic language of the Rulebook." However, Bambra found issues with the number of unusual rules, which he felt hindered play. "The Rules are not easy to understand, because there are so many special cases which overrule the norms." Bambra gave the game an overall score of 7 out of 10, saying, "In terms of enjoyment... Wizards is a success. Though it is at times frustrating, at other times it is compelling and fascinating."

J C Conner reviewed Wizards for Imagine magazine, and stated that "Overall, a good game; long, but interesting and fun."

== Reviews ==
- Jeux & Stratégie #23
