= Shinobu Yaguchi =

Japanese film director and screenwriter (born 1967)

- Born: 30 May 1967 (age 59); Isehara, Kanagawa, Japan
- Occupations: Film director, screenwriter

Shinobu Yaguchi (矢口 史靖, Yaguchi Shinobu; born 30 May 1967) is a Japanese film director and screenwriter. He specializes in feel-good "zero to hero" films, where a group of people take up an unlikely activity, face a number of obstacles, but finally succeed. His film Waterboys was particularly successful and led to a TV series which entered its third season in 2005. He was awarded Best Screenplay at the 2005 Yokohama Film Festival for his film Swing Girls.

== Selected filmography ==
=== Director ===
Year	Title	Story	Genre
1990	Rain Woman (Ameonna)	The anarchic misadventures of two girls.	Comedy
1993	Down the Drain (Hadashi no Pikunikku)	After trying to use her friend's train pass, schoolgirl Junko (Noburu Iguchi) experiences a series of misadventures as she makes her way through a less-than-friendly depiction of modern Japan.	Black comedy
1996	Bird Watching		Short film
1997	My Secret Cache (Himitsu no hanazono)	Bank teller Sakiko Suzuki (Naomi Nishida) experiences a series of bad luck events as she chases her money through her hometown. Not to be confused with the 2007 TV series.	Comedy
1999	Adrenaline Drive (Adorenarin doraibu)	The car of nerdy clerk Suzuki (Masanobu Andō) bumps into another car and he finds himself facing Kuroiwa (Kirina Mano), who turns out to be a gangster. Thus a crazy chase begins that will soon gain him adventure, confidence, and love with a shy nurse.	Black comedy
1999	One Piece!	A compilation of short films created without using any camera movement or editing. Their stories had to be told in "one piece" of celluloid. Not to be confused with the anime series.	Short film
2001	Waterboys	Based on a true event that chronicles five boys' attempts to form a synchronized swimming team at their high school. The film's success sparked a TV spin-off, its TV sequel and a two-part TV special.	Comedy
2002	Parco Fiction	Toru struggles with the madcap fall-out of an environmental matter that somehow lands in his convenience store.	Comedy
2004	Swing Girls	Based on a true story of high school girls' efforts to form a traditional jazz band in rural Yamagata prefecture.	Comedy
2008	Happy Flight	Pilots, flight attendants and passengers struggle to cope with a number of misadventures during their Japan-Hawaii flight.	Comedy
2012	Robo-G	Three employees of the Kimura Electrical Company are due to present a new robot at an important exhibition.	Comedy
2014	Wood Job!	A young man decides to join a forestry training program.	Comedy
2017	Survival Family	A dysfunctional family of four make their way across Japan after the country loses all electric power for a prolonged period of time.	Comedy
2019	Dance with Me (aka Can't Stop the Dancing)	A visit to a quack hypnotist that leaves a Tokyo salarywoman unable to stop breaking out the dance moves every time she hears music (or even a few notes) leads her on a journey across Japan in comic pursuit of the man, in hope that he will de-hypnotize her.	Musical comedy
2025	Dollhouse		Mystery
