= Ant Wars (board game) =

Board game

Ant Wars is a 1982 board game published by Jason McAllister Games.

== Gameplay ==
Ant Wars is a game in which tribes of ants battle each other for control of the back yard.

== Reception ==
Steve Jackson reviewed Ant Wars in Space Gamer No. 66. Jackson commented that "On the whole [...] it's fun. I can't help it . . . I have to say this: I like it despite the bugs in it. Sorry . . . couldn't resist."

Ken Rolston reviewed Ant Wars in White Wolf #43 (May, 1994) and stated that "Another distinctive virtue of Ant Wars is that is permits gamers who feel vaguely uneasy about playing wargames ('No more war toys!') to enjoy the thrill of military campaigns. They can experience the moral burden of visiting bloodshed and hardships on human populations without the 'human' loss."

== Reviews ==
- Adventure Gaming #13
