= Catherine Annau =

Canadian filmmaker

Catherine Annau is a Canadian documentary filmmaker and writer.

Annau's debut feature Just Watch Me: Trudeau and the '70s Generation won numerous awards including a Genie Award, and appeared at New York's Lincoln Center, the National Gallery in Washington D.C., at the Canadian Cultural Centre in Paris, and at various film festivals worldwide.

Annau's other directing work includes the international co-production Sexual Intelligence with Kim Cattrall, broadcast on HBO, Channel 4, and Discovery Canada; Winning, a documentary about lottery winners, broadcast by the Sundance Channel U.S and public broadcasters, and The Power Refugees, a half-hour documentary about young Canadians in New York, which was nominated for a Gemini award. She produced and directed for CBC's investigative journalism series The Fifth Estate. Her documentary The Good Father about one of Canada's worst sexual predators won a Gracie Award (U.S). She has also produced an internationally award-winning documentary on women and heart disease, Wisdom of the Heart.

A published author, her written work has appeared in the Trudeau Albums (Penguin Books, 2000), and in The Globe and Mail, as well as in academic journals and anthologies of Canadian history.

Annau produced and directed Brick by Brick: the Story of Evergreen Brickworks, a documentary film about urban and environmental renewal and the Nazi POWs who helped build modern Toronto. It won a Heritage Toronto Award of Excellence.

== Filmography ==
=== Director ===
- Sexual Intelligence With Kim Cattrall - HBO/Discovery Channel Canada (Documentary)
- Just Watch Me: Trudeau and the '70s Generation - National Film Board of Canada (Documentary)
- Brick by Brick - The Story of Evergreen Brickworks - OMNI 1 Television (Documentary)
- Winning: Life after the Lottery - TVO/Sundance Channel (Documentary)
- The Power Refugees - TVOntario (Documentary)
- Gold Medal Plates: The Quest for Canada's Best Chef - Lively Media (Documentary series)
- Opening Soon - The Food Network (TV series)
- Balance: Television for Living Well - CTV (TV series, selected episodes)

=== Producer ===
- Dragons' Den - CBC (Reality series, selected episodes)
- Spoiled Rotten - Temple Street (Reality series)
- Pure Design - HGTV (TV series)
- Wisdom of the Heart:Women and Heart Disease - CBC Newsworld/TVO (TV series)
- Brick by Brick - The Story of Evergreen Brickworks - OMNI 1 Television (Documentary)
- The Good Father - CBC (Documentary)
- Winning: Life after the Lottery - TVO/Sundance Channel (Documentary)
- The Power Refugees - TVOntario (Documentary)

== Awards and nominations ==
- Brick by Brick - The Story of Evergreen Brickworks - OMNI 1 Television (Documentary)
  - Winner of a 2011 Heritage Toronto Award of Excellence
- Just Watch Me: Trudeau and the '70s Generation
  - Genie Award for Best Feature Length Documentary
  - Sudbury Cinéfest Best Ontario Feature
  - Toronto International Film Festival Best Canadian First Feature Film
  - Blockbuster People's Choice Awards Best Feature Length Documentary
  - Columbus International Film & Video Festival Chris Award
- The Good Father
  - The Gracie Award Outstanding Investigative Program (USA)
  - 3 Gemini Award Nominations - including Best Direction in a News or Information Segment, Best Host/Interviewer, Best Editing
- Wisdom of the Heart: Women and Heart Disease
  - Houston International Film Festival Silver Medal
  - Columbus International Film & Video Festival Bronze Plaque
  - National Educational Media Network Awards Silver Apple
- Winning: Life after the Lottery
  - Nominated Gemini Award
- The Power Refugees
  - Nominated Gemini Award Best Information Segment
- Dragon's Den
  - Nominated Gemini Awards Best Reality Program or Series
