= By the Sword! =

Board game

By the Sword! is a 1982 board game published by The Legionnaire .

== Gameplay ==
By the Sword! is a game purported to be derived from a poem composed by a Nordic ruler of the later Dark Ages era named Bendigeid, which describes a battle in the form of a wargame and its complete rules.

== Reception ==
Fred Askew reviewed By the Sword! in The Space Gamer No. 58. Askew commented that "If you would like to include large battles in your FRP world and don't mind learning a fairly complex new game system, look at this title. If you are not interested in large battles, or don't want to learn any involved rules, this is not for you. I recommend that anyone interested in fantasy should at least look this game over. It's not perfect, but a great deal of work has gone into it."
