= Legality of Israeli settlements =

Israeli settlements in the Israeli-occupied Palestinian territories of the West Bank and the Gaza Strip (former), as well as in the Syrian Golan Heights, are illegal under international law. These settlements are in violation of Article 49 of the Fourth Geneva Convention, and in breach of international declarations. In a 2024 advisory opinion by the International Court of Justice (ICJ) relating to the Palestinian territories, the court reaffirmed the illegality of the settlements and called on Israel to end its occupation, cease its settlement activity, and evacuate all its settlers.

The United Nations Security Council, the United Nations General Assembly, the International Committee of the Red Cross, the International Court of Justice and the High Contracting Parties to the Convention have all affirmed that the Fourth Geneva Convention applies to the Israeli-occupied territories. (Note: "SC Res. 446 (Mar. 22, 1979), adopted by 12 votes to none, with 3 abstentions (Norway, the United Kingdom and the United States), reaffirmed the applicability of the fourth Geneva Convention, as well as opposing the establishment of Israeli settlements in the occupied territories." (Roberts 1990, p. 69)) (Note: "In its advisory opinion of 9 July 2004, on the Legal Consequences of the Construction of a Wall in the Occupied Palestinian Territory, the International Court of Justice found Israel in breach of several international law obligations by its construction of a separation barrier on West Bank territory. ... The Court flatly rejects the Israeli claims concerning the inapplicability of the Fourth Geneva Convention to the West Bank and concerning the inapplicability of Article 49 to the Jewish settlements in the areas occupied by Israel. Neither of these claims gained serious support from the international community." (Benvenisti 2012, pp. xvii, 140)) Numerous UN resolutions and prevailing international opinion hold that Israeli settlements are a violation of international law, including UN Security Council resolutions 446 in 1979, 478 in 1980, and 2334 in 2016. In 2014, 126 Representatives at the reconvened Conference of the High Contracting Parties to the Geneva Conventions declared the settlements illegal, as well as the International Committee of the Red Cross.

Israel disputes the illegality of its settlements, claiming that Israeli citizens were neither deported nor transferred to the territories, that the territory is not occupied since there had been no internationally recognized legal sovereign prior, and that the Fourth Geneva Convention does not de jure apply. The ICJ's 2024 advisory opinion countered many of Israel's arguments. Furthermore, the Supreme Court of Israel has repeatedly ruled that international law applies to Israel's presence in the West Bank.

The establishment of settlements has been described by some legal experts as a war crime according to the Rome Statute (to which Palestine is a party, though Israel is not a party), and is currently under investigation as part of the International Criminal Court investigation in Palestine.

== Background ==
Shortly after independence, the Israeli Supreme Court ruled that the fundamental principles of international law, accepted as binding by all civilized nations, were to be incorporated in the domestic legal system of Israel. In the aftermath of the 1967 Six-Day War, Israel occupied the Sinai Peninsula, the Gaza Strip, West Bank, East Jerusalem and Golan Heights. Theodor Meron, at the time the Israeli government's authority on the topic of international law and legal counsel to the Israeli Foreign Ministry, was asked to provide a memorandum regarding the status in international law of proposed settlement of the territories, which he subsequently addressed to the Foreign Minister Abba Eban on 14 September 1967. He concluded that short-term military settlements would be permissible, but that "civilian settlement in the administered territories contravenes the explicit provisions of the Fourth Geneva Convention," adding that the prohibition on any such population transfer was categorical, and that "civilian settlement in the administered territories contravenes the explicit provisions of the Fourth Geneva Convention." It follows from the presence on files of these notes, Gershom Gorenberg argues, that the Prime Minister at the time, Levi Eshkol, knew that Israeli settlements in the territories Israel had just occupied would violate international laws and that by that time Eshkol had been actively engaged in exploring the possibility of settling the newly conquered region. Meron's unequivocal legal opinion was marked top secret and not made public. Fifty years later, Meron reiterated his view.

The Israeli government proceeded to authorise the construction of military settlements for security purposes. They were built on the fringes of the territories, along the Jordanian and Syrian frontiers and along the edges of the Sinai Peninsula. Israel announced that it accepted Security Council Resolution 242 and was ready to negotiate with each Arab state on each element in that resolution. Abba Eban told George Ball Israel was willing to return "most of the West Bank" to Jordan. Egypt and Jordan demanded simultaneous negotiations and withdrawal, with Jordan's King Hussein suggesting that if negotiations did not achieve peace within six months or a year, the withdrawn Israel troops could reoccupy the West Bank and make a separate peace treaty with the Palestinians. (Note: "Israel would withdraw from the Occupied territories and be replaced by UN forces. The parties would agree in advance to a transition period lasting from six months to a year. During this time, negotiations would be held between the Arab states and Israel, with the aim of achieving a permanent peace. If within the stated time they did not achieve peace, Israel would return its forces to the territories upon UN authorization. In this case, the inhabitants of the territories would be allowed to take matters into their own hand and sign a separate peace agreement with Israel. Sasson responded that there were no interim solutions and advised the bishop not to get carried away by such flimsy initiatives." (Segev 2007, pp. 517–518)) Levi Eshkol informed Washington it would return Syrian and Egyptian territory in exchange for peace, but there was no mention of returning the West Bank, though secret talks with Jordan did take place over possible forms of accommodation between the two countries regarding it. In the meantime, with government permission granted, Kfar Etzion was re-established in September 1967, becoming the first civilian settlement to be built in the West Bank. During the 1970s, Israel's Supreme Court regularly ruled that the establishment of civilian settlements by military commanders was legal on the basis that they formed part of the territorial defense network and were considered temporary measures needed for military and security purposes. After Likud came to power in 1977, using land on the basis of the 1907 Hague Regulations, which implied a temporary nature of Israeli presence, was not employed anymore as the new government declared land in the West Bank "state land".

In 1978 and 1979 the Israeli Supreme court, prompted by the new government policies, ruled on two important cases that set out the requirements for Israeli settlement legality under international law. In Ayauub et al. vs. Minister of Defence (the Beit-El Toubas case), the Court determined that the Hague Conventions but not the Geneva Conventions could be applied by Israeli courts on land and settlement issues in the occupied territories. The following year the Court ruled on Dwikat et al. vs. the Government of Israel (the Elon Moreh case), outlining the Hague Conventions' limitations on Israeli land acquisition and settlements. Settlements, whether on private or public land, could not be considered permanent, nor could the land be permanently confiscated, only temporarily requisitioned. Settlements on private land were legal only if determined to be a military necessity; the original owner retained title to the land and must be paid rental fees for its use. Public lands' possession cannot be alienated, nor its basic character transformed.

== Status of the territories ==
All areas in question were captured by Israel in the 1967 Six-Day War. Prior to 1967, no Israeli government claimed ownership over the West Bank, not even East Jerusalem (Israel did however demand control over Jewish cemeteries of East Jerusalem). While most of the international community regard the West Bank as occupied, Israel calls them "disputed". The argument that Israel had a claim to the territories was first articulated after 1967 by Yehuda Zvi Blum and then adopted by Israel's Attorney General Meir Shamgar.

Israel has treated them in three different ways:

- "East Jerusalem"—Jerusalem and its surroundings were envisioned as an international area under United Nations administration in the 1947 partition plan, which was accepted by the Jewish Agency but rejected by all Arab nations. In 1948, Jordan captured and annexed the eastern half of Jerusalem, while Israel captured and annexed the west. Following the Six-Day War in 1967, Israel annexed the eastern part, together with several villages around it. In 1980 the Israeli Knesset passed the Jerusalem Law claiming that "Jerusalem, complete and united, is the capital of Israel".
- The Israeli Golan Heights Law of 1981 applied Israel's "laws, jurisdiction and administration" in the Golan Heights, captured from Syria in 1967. Although the law did not use the term, it was considered by the international community and some members of the Israeli opposition as an annexation
- The Gaza Strip and West Bank form part of the areas offered by the UN to a prospective Arab state of Palestine in the Partition Plan, which was rejected by the Arabs. From 1948 until 1967, The Gaza Strip was occupied by Egypt and the West Bank was annexed by Jordan. Together with the annexation of East Jerusalem mentioned above, Jordan's annexation of the West Bank was not recognized internationally. Since 1967, the West Bank has been under military occupation. Gaza was also occupied in 1967, but after Israel's unilateral disengagement in 2005 the status has become disputed, with conflicting opinions on whether or not the occupation has ended. (Note: Experts like Eyal Benvenisti, together with the Israeli Supreme Court, consider the Gaza occupation ended, while the majority view, back by Yoram Dinstein, NGOs like Amnesty International and the United Nations Security Council (UNS C Resolution 1860 (2009) appears to be that it still holds (Cuyckens 2017, pp. 38–39).)

The Jerusalem Law and the Golan Heights Law have both been deemed illegal by the UN Security Council (resolutions 478 and 497 respectively), and are not recognized by the international community. The United States abstained from the vote on Resolution 478 and the U.S. Congress passed the Jerusalem Embassy Act, altering key passages to avoid a presidential veto, recognizing Jerusalem as the capital of Israel. The provisions of the law to implement a move of the embassy can be deferred or blocked by the exercise of an Executive waiver. The U.S. views that parts of Jerusalem are not in Israel (Note: 'the U.S. government does not recognize all of Jerusalem as part of Israel.' (Migdalovitz 2010, p. 51)) and the official U.S. position is that the status of Jerusalem must be resolved in negotiations. The EU views that Jerusalem is a corpus separatum, and the United Nations considers Israel's proclamation of Jerusalem as its capital to be "null and void".

Israel has signed peace treaties with Egypt (removing all Israeli settlements and returning the Sinai Peninsula to Egyptian sovereignty), and Jordan (returning small sections to Jordanian sovereignty); there are currently no peace treaties governing Israel's borders related to the West Bank, the Gaza Strip, and the Golan Heights.

Defining The International Criminal Court's Rome Statute provisions about transfer of civilians was complicated by Israel's position, since Israel felt it was being targeted. As formulated it states that one type of offence occurs when the perpetrator transfers "directly or indirectly" a portion of its own population into an occupied territory, stipulating that "transfer" must be understood "in accordance with the relevant provisions of international law." Israel initially voted against the Statute because of this passage, but later, in December 2000, signed it, only to declare in June 2002, that it had no intention of ratifying it.

== International legal opinions ==
At present, based on the result of numerous UN resolutions that cite Article 49 of the Geneva Convention, the consensus view of the international community is that Israeli settlements are illegal and constitute a violation of international law. (Note: "there is an overwhelming (and rare) international legal consensus that the territories are occupied, that the law of belligerent occupation applies, and that the settlements are illegal and indeed constitute a grave breach of the GC IV," (Ben-Naftali, Sfard & Viterbo 2018, p. 280)) (Note: "The view that the fourth Geneva Convention is applicable, and should be applied, in all the territories occupied by Israel in 1967 has been very widely held internationally. Indeed, a remarkable degree of unanimity prevails on this matter. Countless international organizations, both intergovernmental and nongovernmental, have taken this view. Within the UN General Assembly, it has been upheld from the beginning of the occupation." (Roberts 1990, p. 69).) According to Tim Franks from the BBC, as of 2008 every government in the world, except Israel, considered the settlements to be illegal. (Note: "The British Government believes that Israeli settlements on occupied territory are illegal. So does every other government in the world, except for Israel." (BBC 2008)) In November 2019, the United States said that it no longer views them as inconsistent with international law.

=== United Nations ===
Since the occupation of the West Bank in 1967, numerous United Nations resolutions, including 446, 452, 465, 471 and 476 affirm unambiguously that Israel's occupation is illegal, and, since Resolution 446 adopted on 22 March 1979, have confirmed that its settlements there have no legal validity and pose a serious obstacle to peace.

United Nations Security Council Resolution 2334 of 2016 states that Israel's settlement activity constitutes a "flagrant violation" of international law and has "no legal validity". It demands that Israel stop such activity and fulfill its obligations as an occupying power under the Fourth Geneva Convention.

In 2004, an advisory opinion by the primary judicial organ of the UN, the International Court of Justice, also found the settlements to be illegal under international law. The court's finding was based on the provisions of the Fourth Geneva Convention and UN Security Council resolutions that condemned the establishment of settlements and attempts by Israel to alter the demographics of the territories under its control. The United Nations General Assembly, which regards itself as having a chief role in the process of the codification of international law, has passed several resolutions with an overwhelming majority that denounce settlements as being illegal. The United Nations Human Rights Council has also called the Israeli settlements and related activities a violation of international law.

According to records of the 1998 meeting of Committee on the Elimination of Racial Discrimination, Theo van Boven said

The status of the settlements was clearly inconsistent with Article 3 of the Convention, which, as noted in the Committee's General Recommendation XIX, prohibited all forms of racial segregation in all countries. There is a consensus among publicists that the prohibition of racial discrimination, irrespective of territories, is an imperative norm of international law.

It has been observed that a double standard appears to apply with regard to Israel's violations of UN resolutions and comparable violations by some other countries. Whereas the UNSC resolutions 660 and 687 regarding Iraq's Invasion of Kuwait and the UNSC 1441 before the Gulf War demanded Iraq's immediate withdrawal from land it occupied belligerently, and regarded as a casus belli its putative recourse to a programme for building weapons of mass destruction, Israel, though occupying a foreign territory and reputedly having a nuclear arsenal, was treated differently. The difference lies in the fact that UN Security Council resolutions against Israel are widely thought to be passed under Chapter VI of the United Nations Charter and are non-binding, being concerned with disputes that are to be resolved peacefully, whereas in the case of Iraq, the resolutions were passed under Chapter VII of the United Nations Charter, which are legally binding. Resolution 242 however, while often thought to have been introduced within the framework of Chapter 6, was considered by both the Arab States and Russia at the time to be binding.

In February 2026, the United Nations Secretary-General reiterated that Israeli measures to resume land registration procedures and designate areas of the occupied West Bank as state property should be reversed immediately. According to the UN, such actions risk dispossessing Palestinians and further entrenching Israel’s presence in occupied territory. The Secretary-General stated that these measures are destabilizing and, consistent with the position previously articulated by the International Court of Justice, unlawful under international law.

=== International Court of Justice ===
In 2004, an advisory opinion by the International Court of Justice concluded that Israel had breached its obligations under international law by establishing settlements in the West Bank, including East Jerusalem and that Israel cannot rely on a right of self-defence or on a state of necessity in order to preclude the wrongfulness of imposing a régime, which is contrary to international law. In its 2004 advisory opinion on the Legal Consequences of the Construction of a Wall in the Occupied Palestinian Territory it states, at paragraph 120, that Article 49(6) "prohibits not only deportations or forced transfers of population…but also any measures taken by an occupying Power in order to organize or encourage transfers of parts of its own population into the occupied territory." All 13 judges were unanimous on the point. The Court also concluded that the Israeli régime violates the basic human rights of the Palestinians by impeding the liberty of movement of the inhabitants of the Occupied Palestinian Territory (with the exception of Israeli citizens) and their exercise of the right to work, to health, to education and to an adequate standard of living. (Note: After the decision, Paul de Waart argued that "the existence of the Palestinian people as the rightful claimant to the OPT is no longer open to question." (de Waart 2005, pp. 467–487))

=== International Committee of the Red Cross ===
The International Committee of the Red Cross (ICRC) holds that the establishment of Israeli settlements violate Fourth Geneva Convention. (Note: "the ICRC has expressed growing concern about the consequences in humanitarian terms of the establishment of Israeli settlements in the occupied territories, in violation of the Fourth Geneva Convention." (ICRC 2001)) (Note: "The ICRC publicly stated that the building of Jewish settlements in the territories, the Israeli use of collective punishments, the destruction of Arab houses as punishment, the expulsion of Arabs from the territories, and the seizing of Arab lands and resources without compelling military necessity, inter alia, all violated the Fourth GC." (Forsythe 2005, p. 73)) The ICRC also holds that the displacement of Palestinians that may occur due to the settlements also violates Article 49 of the Fourth Geneva Convention. (Note: the ICRC holds that the displacement of populations which may result from the settlements are violations of Article 49 (Cohen 1985, p. 161))

=== European Union ===
In June 1980, the (then nine-member) European Economic Community declared in the Venice Declaration that "settlements, as well as modifications in population and property in the occupied Arab territories, are illegal under international law." In 2002 and again in 2012, the European Union reiterated its view that the settlements are illegal. In November 2019, in a statement made after the change in the United States four-decade-old position, the European Union said that it continued to believe that Israeli settlement activity in occupied Palestinian territory was illegal under international law and eroded prospects for lasting peace. EU foreign policy chief Federica Mogherini said "The EU calls on Israel to end all settlement activity, in line with its obligations as an occupying power".

=== Countries ===
==== United States ====
An opinion in 1978 by Legal Adviser of the Department of State Herbert J. Hansell concluded that the settlements are "inconsistent with international law", and against Article 49 of the Fourth Geneva Convention. The Hansell Memorandum found that "[w]hile Israel may undertake, in the occupied territories, actions necessary to meet its military needs and to provide for orderly government during the occupation, for the reasons indicated above the establishment of the civilian settlements in those territories is inconsistent with international law."

Notwithstanding the Hansell opinion, the official US position had been that the settlements are "an obstacle to peace". In February 1981, Ronald Reagan announced that he didn't believe that Israeli settlements in the West Bank were illegal. He added that "the UN resolution leaves the West Bank open to all people, Arab and Israeli alike". Hoping to achieve a peace deal, he nevertheless asked Israel to freeze construction calling the settlements an "obstacle to peace". The permissive attitude taken by America accelerated the pace of Israel's settlement programme. Reagan's view on the settlements legality was not held by the State Department. The George H.W. Bush, Clinton, and George W. Bush administrations did not publicly comment on the legality of Israeli settlements, but spoke publicly against them. Since the Clinton administration, the U.S. has continued to object to the settlements, calling them "obstacles to peace" and prejudicial to the outcome of final status talks. Although President Barack Obama and diplomatic officials in his administration have stated, "the United States does not accept the legitimacy of continued Israeli settlements," (Note: "And the Obama Administration's position on settlements is clear, unequivocal. It has not changed. And as the President has said on many occasions, the United States does not accept the legitimacy of continued Israeli settlements" (Rozen 2009).) in February 2011 the U.S. vetoed a Security Council resolution that would have declared the settlements illegal. In December 2016, the U.S. abstained on a Security Council Resolution that declared that Israeli settlements are illegal and deemed their continuing construction a "flagrant violation" of international law. In abstaining, U.S. Ambassador Samantha Power stated, "Today the Security Council reaffirmed its established consensus that the settlements have no legal validity. The United States has been sending a message that settlements must stop privately and publicly for nearly five decades." This position was United States policy and had been stated by Secretary of State John Kerry and by the Johnson, Nixon, Ford, Carter, and Obama administrations. In November 2019, the Trump administration expressly repudiated the Hansell opinion and stated that the United States considered the status of the settlements as being "not inconsistent with" international law. Secretary of State Mike Pompeo also said: "The hard truth is that there will never be a judicial resolution to the conflict, and arguments about who is right and who is wrong as a matter of international law will not bring peace." However, Pompeo added that "the United States Government is expressing no view on the legal status of any individual settlement."

The United States has never voted in favor of any UN Resolution calling the settlements illegal except for Resolution 465 in 1980. In that case the Carter administration subsequently announced that the vote had been cast in error (Note: 'Israel requested the United States to vote against the resolution, however the Carter administration instructed its U.N. ambassador, Mr. McHenry, to seek the deletion of paragraph eight (dealing with Jerusalem and the holy places) and eliminate three other paragraphs calling for the dismantling of existing Israeli settlements. But due to what was later termed "communication failure", the President did not see the text of the resolution, and Secretary Vance was ordered by him to authorize Ambassador McHenry to support it, while issuing a "strong reservation" on the dismantling clause. The resolution was adopted by a vote of 15 to none. Israel rejected the resolution and few days later the Carter administration issued a statement disavowing the vote saying it was cast in error." (MoFHD)) due to miscommunication and would have abstained as it had for Resolution 446 and Resolution 452. Three US Ambassadors to the UN have stated that Israeli settlements are illegal: George H. W. Bush (later US president) on 25 September 1971, William Scranton on 25 May 1976, and Samantha Power on 23 December 2016. Secretaries of State Cyrus Vance and John Kerry (Note: "In fact, this resolution simply reaffirms statements made by the Security Council on the legality of settlements over several decades. It does not break new ground. In 1978, the State Department Legal Adviser advised the Congress on his conclusion that Israel's government, the Israeli Government's program of establishing civilian settlements in the occupied territory is inconsistent with international law, and we see no change since then to affect that fundamental conclusion.' (Kerry 2016)) also said the settlements were illegal.

The United States had consistently described the settlements as an obstruction to peace, and sometimes as illegal. In November 2019, US President Donald Trump expressed the position that the settlements were not illegal and rejected the position that the West Bank is occupied territory. However, on 31 March 2021, the US Department of State clarified "It is a historical fact that Israel occupied the West Bank, Gaza, and the Golan Heights after the 1967 war," and "In fact, the 2020 Human Rights Report does use the term "occupation" in the context of the current status of the West Bank. This has been the longstanding position of previous administrations of both parties over the course of many decades."

In response to the United States announcement on 18 November 2019 that it no longer considers Israeli settlements to be inconsistent with international law, the United Nations responded:

A change in the policy position of one state does not modify existing international law nor its interpretation by the International Court of Justice (ICJ) and the Security Council,

At the monthly meeting of the United Nations Security Council, just two days after the U.S. announcement, the 14 other Council members strongly opposed the U.S. position and before the meeting began, Britain, France, Germany, Belgium and Poland reiterated in a joint statement that "all settlement activity is illegal under international law." After the meeting, ambassadors from the 10 non-permanent council members who serve two-year terms made a joint statement:

Israeli settlement activities are illegal, erode the viability of the two-state solution and undermine the prospect for a just, lasting and comprehensive peace.

as affirmed by the 2016 council resolution. The statement also called on Israel to end all settlement activity and expressed concern at calls for possible annexation of areas in the West Bank.

==== Israel ====
The Israeli government's essential position is that rather than being "occupied territory," the West Bank is "disputed territory." Given that the Arab states prevented the formation of the sovereignty proposed by the 1947 partition resolution, Jordan's subsequent unrecognized annexation of the West Bank in 1950, as well as the fact that there has never been a Palestinian sovereignty in that territory, it has been posited that there is no legally recognized claim to who has sovereignty over the West Bank. The argument is one made by Meir Shamgar much earlier.

The Israeli notary Howard Grief argued that, according to Article 6 of The Anglo-American Treaty of 1924, Jewish Settlements are not illegal. The United States, he maintains, had accepted Palestine as the national home of the Jewish people, and not as the homeland of "a fictitious, non-existent entity, the Palestinian people." The Anglo-American Treaty of 1924 still has the force of law pursuant to Article 80 of the UN Charter by virtue of the 1969 Vienna Convention on the Laws of Treaties.

Israel considers its settlement policy to be consistent with international law, including the Fourth Geneva Convention, while recognizing that some of the smaller settlements have been constructed "illegally" in the sense of being in violation of Israeli law. In 1998 the Israeli Minister of Foreign Affairs produced The International Criminal Court Background Paper. It affirms in conclusion that

International law has long recognised that there are crimes of such severity they should be considered "international crimes". Such crimes have been established in treaties such as the Genocide Convention and the Geneva Conventions... The following are Israel's primary issues of concern [i.e. with the rules of the ICC]: – The inclusion of settlement activity as a "war crime" is a cynical attempt to abuse the Court for political ends. The implication that the transfer of civilian population to occupied territories can be classified as a crime equal in gravity to attacks on civilian population centres or mass murder is preposterous and has no basis in international law.

Israel also argues that some of the settlements are built in areas where Jewish settlements existed before the 1948 Arab–Israeli War and violence prior, when many West Bank settlements were destroyed and the residents massacred or expelled, such as Hartuv, Kfar Etzion, Hebron, and the Jewish Quarter of Jerusalem, and therefore the application of the Geneva Convention is an entirely different issue.

Some argue that according to international law Israel is the custodian of absentee property in the West Bank and may not give it to settlers. In 1997 the Civil Administration's legal adviser gave his opinion:

The Custodian of Absentee Property in the West Bank is nothing but a trustee looking after the property so it is not harmed while the owners are absent from the area ... the custodian may not make any transaction regarding the asset that conflicts with the obligation to safeguard the asset as stated, especially his obligation to return the asset to the owner upon his return to the region.

Israel contends that the Geneva Convention only applies in the absence of an operative peace agreement and between two powers accepting the convention. Since the Oslo Accords leave the issue of settlements to be negotiated later, proponents of this view argue that the Palestinians accepted the temporary presence of Israeli settlements pending further negotiation, and that there is no basis for declaring them illegal.

Israel has justified its civilian settlements by claiming that a temporary use of land and buildings for various purposes appears permissible under a plea of military necessity and that the settlements fulfilled security needs. Yehuda Blum further argued in 1971 that United Nations Security Council Resolution 242 calls for "secure and recognized boundaries", and that neither the 1949 armistice demarcation lines, nor the 1967 cease-fire lines have proved themselves secure.

In 2002, the Israeli Ministry of Foreign Affairs reiterated that the settlements were being developed consistently with international law and that they did not violate any agreements with either the Palestinians or Jordan. They added that the settlements in the West Bank and Gaza Strip were recognised as legitimate by the Mandate for Palestine adopted by the League of Nations, and that the only administration that completely prohibited Jewish settlement was that of Jordan from 1948 to 1967. Regarding the Geneva Convention, they maintained that the Israeli government was not forcibly transferring its population into the territories. Neither had the land that was being settled been under the legitimate sovereignty of any state beforehand. It further highlighted that no clauses in the convention could be used to prohibit the voluntary return of individuals to towns and villages from which they or their ancestors had been previously ejected by forcible means. It claimed the settlements had only been established after exhaustive investigations making sure none were built on private land.

==== Canada ====
Canada, agreeing with UN Security Council Resolutions 446 and 465, argues that the Fourth Geneva Convention applies to the occupied territories (the Golan Heights, the West Bank, East Jerusalem and the Gaza Strip) and that Israeli settlements are a violation of the Fourth Geneva Convention.

==== United Kingdom ====
In 2009, British Foreign Secretary David Miliband called Israeli settlements "illegal". In December 2012, William Hague, the British foreign secretary stated that all Israeli settlements were "illegal under international law".

=== Other views ===
In 2003, The Non-Aligned Movement declared Israeli settlements as illegal, stating, "the main danger to the realization of the national rights of the Palestinian people and the achievement of a peaceful solution is the settler colonialism that has been carried out in the Occupied Palestinian Territory, including East Jerusalem, since 1967, through land confiscation, settlement building and the transfer of Israeli nationals to the Occupied Territory." The Organisation of Islamic Cooperation views settlements as "a blatant defiance of the international will, constitutes a flagrant violation of international law and relevant conventions, agreements and international legitimacy resolutions, and represents a manifest aggression on the rights of the Palestinian people to their land". The human rights groups Amnesty International, Human Rights Watch and B'Tselem have reiterated their view that Israeli settlements as violations of international law. (Note: "The establishment of the settlements contravenes international humanitarian law (IHL), which states that an occupying power may not relocate its own citizens to the occupied territory or make permanent changes to that territory, unless these are needed for imperative military needs, in the narrow sense of the term, or undertaken for the benefit of the local population." (B'Tselem 2017)) The Anti-Defamation League disagrees, asserting that the statement that "settlements are a violation of international law" is inaccurate, and providing activists with a list of responses for maintaining that they do not violate those laws. In 2024, the Norwegian Minister of Foreign Affairs Espen Barth Eide stated, "Israel’s settlement policy in the West Bank, including East Jerusalem, is in violation of international law, including international humanitarian law and human rights".

Morris B. Abram, an American lawyer who was involved in drafting the Fourth Geneva Convention, argued that the convention "was not designed to cover situations like Israeli settlements in the occupied territories, but rather the forcible transfer, deportation or resettlement of large numbers of people." International law expert Julius Stone, Professor of Jurisprudence and International Law at the University of Sydney, and Eugene Rostow, Dean of Yale Law School, argued that the settlements are legal under international law, on a number of different grounds, among them that "settlements are the voluntary return of individuals in towns and villages from which they or their ancestors have been ousted... Israel has valid claims to title in the territory based...on historic and religious connection to the land". Stone held that it was legal for Israel to establish Nahal settlements, necessary for military purposes along the ceasefire lines and in the Jordan Valley. The fact that they had been established to initiate profitable agriculture was of no legal concern. William M. Brinton, an American publisher with a background in international law, held that Israel was "at least quasi-sovereign with respect to both areas [the West Bank and Gaza Strip] under principles of customary international law", and deemed the settlements legal.

== Legal arguments ==
Almost all international lawyers and every state but Israel regard the Geneva Conventions as part of customary international law, implying all states are duty bound to observe them. Israel alone challenges this premise, arguing that the West Bank and Gaza are "disputed territories", and that the Conventions do not apply because these lands did not form part of another state's sovereign territory, and that the transfer of Jews into areas like the West Bank is not a government act but a voluntary movement by Israeli Jewish people, not acting under compulsion, a position contested by Yoram Dinstein. (Note: 'The Israeli Foreign Ministry has also contributed a rationale for rejecting Israel's de jure obligation to uphold the Fourth Convention, arguing that the Convention only prohibits civilian transfers compelled by the government, not voluntary transfers undertaken by the civilians themselves. Recall the language of Article 49: "The Occupying Power shall not transfer its own civilians into the territory it occupies" (emphasis added). On the Foreign Minister's reading, even if the Geneva Convention applies, voluntary transfers do not violate it, because the Occupying Power is not doing the transfer.' (Galchinsky 2004, pp. 120–121))

The international community has rejected Israel's unwillingness to accept the applicability of the Geneva Conventions to the territories it occupies.

=== Fourth Geneva Convention ===
There are two disputes regarding the Fourth Geneva Convention: whether the convention applies to the territories in question and whether the Convention forbids the establishment of Israeli settlements. Article 2 concerns the applicability of the Convention whereas article 49 concerns the legality of population transfers.

==== Article 2 ====
Article 2 extends the convention to "all cases of declared war or of any other armed conflict which may arise between two or more of the High Contracting Parties" and "all cases of partial or total occupation of the territory of a High Contracting Party".

===== Endorsement =====
The applicability of the fourth Geneva Convention to "all the territories occupied by Israel in 1967" is held with "a remarkable degree of unanimity" among international actors. In a 2004 advisory opinion to the UN General Assembly, the International Court of Justice stated that Article 2 of the Convention applied to the case of Israel's presence in the territories captured during the 1967 war. It stated that Article 2 applies if there exists an armed conflict between two contracting parties, regardless of the territories' status in international law before the armed attack. It also argued that "no territorial acquisition resulting from the threat or use of force shall be recognized as legal" according to customary international law and defined by "Declaration on Principles of International Law concerning Friendly Relations and Co-operation among States in accordance with the Charter of the United Nations" (General Assembly Resolution 2625).

At their July 1999 Conference, the States parties to the Fourth Geneva Convention issued a statement in which they "reaffirmed the applicability of the Fourth Geneva Convention to the Occupied Palestinian Territory, including East Jerusalem". In December 2001, the High Contracting Parties to the Convention reaffirmed the "applicability of the Fourth Geneva Convention to the Occupied Palestinian Territory, including East Jerusalem". They further reminded the contracting parties, the parties to the conflict and the state of Israel as the occupying power, of their obligations under the convention.

The International Committee of the Red Cross in a declaration of December 2001 stated that "the ICRC has always affirmed the de jure applicability of the Fourth Geneva Convention to the territories occupied since 1967 by the state of Israel, including East Jerusalem".

The United Nations General Assembly has affirmed the applicability of the convention to the Palestinian Territories in many resolutions. The United Nations Security Council has taken the same view. Security Council resolution 271 (1969) called upon "Israel scrupulously to observe the provisions of the Geneva Conventions and international law governing military occupation". Security Council resolution 446 (1979) affirmed "once more that the Geneva Convention relative to the Protection of Civilian Persons in Time of War, of 12 August 1949, is applicable to the Arab territories occupied by Israel since 1967, including Jerusalem".

The Supreme Court of Israel in a ruling of 30 May 2004 declared, "the military operations of the [Israeli Defence Forces] in Rafah, to the extent they affect civilians, are governed by Hague Convention IV Respecting the Laws and Customs of War on Land 1907 ... and the Geneva Convention relative to the Protection of Civilian Persons in Time of War 1949." A further June 2004 Israeli Supreme Court ruling concerning the West Bank stated that "the point of departure of all parties – which is also our point of departure – is that Israel holds the Area in belligerent occupation (occupatio bellica)" and that the military commander's authority is "anchored in IV Geneva Convention Relative to the Protection of Civilian Persons in Time of War 1949".

===== Rejection =====
The official Israeli legal argument against the application of Article 2 to the situation in the West Bank is based on a 1971 interpretation, planned before the events of 1967, by Israeli Attorney-General, Meir Shamgar, who in his capacity as Military Attorney General in the early 1960s had already worked out legal textbooks and military kits for the IDF to cope with a situation where that organization might find itself in a position of an occupying power. His view was presented by Moshe Dayan in a speech before the 32nd session of the United Nations General Assembly in 1977. Shamgar believed that the Convention did not pertain to the territories captured by Israel since they had not previously been recognised as part of a sovereign state and could not be considered "the territory of a High Contracting Party". (Note: Stone's view that the UN definition of aggression, which excluded anti-colonial uprisings, did not reflect customary law. "Though Julius Stone argued that the proviso does not reflect customary law, the General Assembly adopted the definition of aggression without a vote. Tom Farer called it 'a global consensus', and it would seem to reflect the views of the overwhelming majority of states" (Quigley 2005, p. 194).)

Shamgar further stated:

There is no rule of international law according to which the Fourth Convention applies in each and every armed conflict whatever the status of the parties.... The whole idea of the restriction of military government powers is based on the assumption that there has been a sovereign who was ousted and that he was a legitimate sovereign. Any other conception would lead to the conclusion, for example, that France should have acted in Alsace-Lorraine according to rule 42–56 of the Hague Rules of 1907, until the signing of a peace treaty.

The Israeli legal argument was dismissed by the International Court of Justice. The Court cited the Geneva Convention's travaux préparatoires, which recommended that the conventions be applicable to any armed conflict "whether [it] is or is not recognized as a state of war by the parties" and "in cases of occupation of territories in the absence of any state of war" as confirmation that the drafters of the article had no intention of restricting the scope of its application. (Note: Ambassador Morris Abram, who was involved in drafting the Fourth Geneva Convention, argued that the convention "was not designed to cover situations like Israeli settlements in the occupied territories, but rather the forcible transfer, deportation or resettlement of large numbers of people." (Baker 2011))

==== Article 49 ====
Article 49 (1) states

Individual or mass forcible transfers, as well as deportations of protected persons from occupied territory to the territory of the Occupying Power or to that of any other country, occupied or not, are prohibited, regardless of their motive.

Article 49 (6) states

The Occupying Power shall not deport or transfer parts of its own civilian population into the territory it occupies.

According to Jean Pictet of the International Committee of the Red Cross, this clause intended to prevent the World War II practice of an occupying power transferring "portions of its own population to occupied territory for political and racial reasons or in order, as they claimed, to colonize those territories", which in turn "worsened the economic situation of the native population and endangered their separate existence as a race".

===== Endorsement =====
U.S. State Department Legal Advisor, Herbert J. Hansell, in a letter dated 1 April 1978, concluded that although Article 49 (1) prohibits forcible transfers of protected persons out of the occupied territory, "paragraph 6 is not so limited."

He argued:

The view has been advanced that a transfer is prohibited under paragraph 6 only to the extent that it involves the displacement of the local population. Although one respected authority, Lauterpacht, evidently took this view, it is otherwise unsupported in the literature, in the rules of international law or in the language and negotiating history of the Convention, and it seems clearly not correct. Displacement of protected persons is dealt with separately in the Convention and paragraph 6 would seem redundant if limited to cases of displacement. Another view of paragraph 6 is that it is directed against mass population transfers such as occurred in World War II for political, racial or colonization ends; but there is no apparent support or reason for limiting its application to such cases.

This interpretation was adopted by the International Court of Justice in its 2004 advisory opinion, and 150 countries supported a non-binding General Assembly resolution demanding Israel to "comply with its legal obligations as mentioned in the advisory opinion".

David Kretzmer, Professor of International Law at Hebrew University of Jerusalem, has argued that it is "quite clear that by actively organizing or encouraging transfer of its own population into the occupied territory, an occupying power does indeed violate Article 49(6)".

===== Rejection =====
Those who reject the application of Article 49 to the situation in the Israeli-held territories argue that even if the Convention did apply, it should be read only in the context of the World War II forcible migrations. It is only intended to cover forcible transfers and to protect the local population from displacement:

- Article 49 (1) specifically covers "individual or mass forcible transfers", whereas the Israelis who live in the settlements have moved there voluntarily.
- Article 49 (6) only applies when the transfer of the Occupying Powers civilian population involves the displacement of the local population, whereas the Israeli settlements are not intended to, or have ever resulted in, the displacement of Palestinians from the area.

In addition, they state that the Geneva Convention only applies in the absence of an operative peace agreement and between two powers accepting the convention. Since the Oslo Accords leave the issue of settlements to be negotiated later, proponents of this view argue that the Palestinians accepted the temporary presence of Israeli settlements pending further negotiation, and that there is no basis for declaring them illegal.

==== Application ====
On 5 December 2001, confirming earlier General Assembly statements, the conference of the High Contracting Parties to the Fourth Geneva Convention ruled that the Convention did apply in the Israeli-occupied territories, parties to the convention were obliged "to actively discourage activities that directly contribute to any construction or development of Israeli settlements in the Occupied Palestinian Territory, including Jerusalem, as these activities contravene international law", and called upon "the Occupying Power to fully and effectively respect the Fourth Geneva Convention in the Occupied Palestinian Territory, including East Jerusalem, and to refrain from perpetrating any violation of the Convention." The High Contracting Parties reaffirmed "the illegality of the settlements in the said territories and of the extension thereof". According to John B. Quigley, as signatory to the Geneva Convention, Israel's position that it does not apply to the West Bank and Gaza Strip because before its occupation those territories were not governed by a sovereign power, and therefore constitutes a different case, has been universally rejected "because the Convention also states that it applies 'in all circumstances' (Article 1), and 'to all cases of declared war or of any other armed conflict' (Article 2)". In practice, Israel does not accept that the Fourth Geneva Convention applies de jure, but has stated that on humanitarian issues it will govern itself de facto by its provisions, without specifying which these are.

=== Arguments based on UNSC Resolution 242 and the British Mandate ===
Rostow and others further argue that UN Security Council Resolution 242 (which Rostow helped draft) mandates Israeli control of the territories, and that the original British Mandate of Palestine still applies, allowing Jewish settlement there. In Rostow's view

The British Mandate recognized the right of the Jewish people to "close settlement" in the whole of the Mandated territory. It was provided that local conditions might require Great Britain to "postpone" or "withhold" Jewish settlement in what is now Jordan. This was done in 1922. But the Jewish right of settlement in Palestine west of the Jordan river, that is, in Israel, the West Bank, Jerusalem, and the Gaza Strip, was made unassailable. That right has never been terminated and cannot be terminated except by a recognized peace between Israel and its neighbors. And perhaps not even then, in view of Article 80 of the U.N. Charter, "the Palestine article", which provides that "nothing in the Charter shall be construed ... to alter in any manner the rights whatsoever of any states or any peoples or the terms of existing international instruments...."

According to Rostow "the Jewish right of settlement in the area is equivalent in every way to the right of the local population to live there".

This right is based on Article 6 of the Mandate, which states: "The Administration of Palestine, while ensuring that the rights and position of other sections of the population are not prejudiced, shall facilitate Jewish immigration under suitable conditions and shall encourage, in cooperation with the Jewish Agency referred to in Article 4, close settlement by Jews on the land, including State lands not required for public use". In addition, many Israeli settlements have been established on sites that were home to Jewish communities before 1948 such as Neve Yaakov, Gush Etzion, Hebron, Kalia, and Kfar Darom.

Contrary to this view other legal scholars have argued that under Articles 31 and 32 of the Vienna Convention on the Law of Treaties the only common-sense interpretation of UNSC 242 is that Israel must withdraw from all of the territory captured in 1967, as any interpretation permitting the extension of sovereignty by conquest would violate the relevant governing principle of international law as emphasized in the preambular statement, i.e., "the inadmissibility of the acquisition of territory by war" as established through the abolition of the right of conquest by the United Nations Charter following World War II.

Furthermore, it is argued that UNSC 242 has binding force under Article 25 of the UN Charter owing to its incorporation into UN Security Council Resolution 338 and that it is also binding on Israel and the PLO by agreement owing to its incorporation into the Oslo Accords.

Others argue that the Oslo Accords supersede UNSC 242 rather than making it binding. The Declaration of Principles in the accords only state that future negotiations will "lead to the implementation of Security Council Resolutions 242 and 338".

Additionally, as the international community considered the status of Jerusalem to be unresolved, even after 1967, and did not deem any part of the city to be Israeli territory, including that part held since 1948, UNSC 242 did not settle territorial issues between Israel and Palestine left unresolved by the 1949 Armistice Agreements. Further, Sir Elihu Lauterpacht and others have argued that, because of the disorder in Palestine at the time, the territorial framework of the 1947 Partition Plan did not come into effect in such a way as to ipso jure grant Israel sovereignty over the territory allocated to the Jewish state under that plan. Stone agrees with Lauterpacht's analysis and his view that sovereignty was acquired through other means:

Lauterpacht has offered a cogent legal analysis leading to the conclusion that sovereignty over Jerusalem has already vested in Israel. His view is that when the partition proposals were immediately rejected and aborted by Arab armed aggression, those proposals could not, both because of their inherent nature and because of the terms in which they were framed, operate as an effective legal re-disposition of the sovereign title. They might (he thinks) have been transformed by agreement of the parties concerned into a consensual root of title, but this never happened. And he points out that the idea that some kind of title remained in the United Nations is quite at odds, both with the absence of any evidence of vesting, and with complete United Nations silence on this aspect of the matter from 1950 to 1967?... In these circumstances, that writer is led to the view that there was, following the British withdrawal and the abortion of the partition proposals, a lapse or vacancy or vacuum of sovereignty. In this situation of sovereignty vacuum, he thinks, sovereignty could be forthwith acquired by any state that was in a position to assert effective and stable control without resort to unlawful means.

Antonio Cassese and John McHugo disagree with this analysis. Cassese argues that although Israel's original occupation of West Jerusalem might have been carried out in an act of self-defense under Article 51 of the UN Charter, this did not confer legal title to the territory owing to the general prohibition in international law on the acquisition of sovereignty through military conquest. He further considers that "mere silence" could not constitute agreement by the United Nations to the acquisition of sovereignty by Israel or Jordan as a result of their de facto control of Jerusalem. Cassese concludes that "at least a tacit manifestation of consent through conclusive acts would have been necessary", whereas such relevant acts as did take place confirmed that no such consent to the transfer of sovereignty was given. For McHugo, Lauterpacht's view that the events of 1947–1948 left no trace for an orderly devolution of sovereignty does not allow one, in the light of Resolution 242, to infer that Israel was thereafter allowed to consolidate title in later conflicts. for:

the emphasis on the inadmissibility of the acquisition of territory by war in Resolution 242 is of general application and, in sharp contrast to the Withdrawal Phase, is not limited to territories occupied in "the refent conflict". Resolution 242 can thus be interpreted as preventing Israel from consolidating title over all territory taken by force at any time in the absence of a final peace settlement.

=== Arguments based on the cause of the war ===
Israel argues that it took control of the West Bank as a result of a defensive war and is therefore entitled to keep the territory. However, international law scholar John Quigley has written, "... a state that uses force in self-defense may not retain territory it takes while repelling an attack. If Israel had acted in self-defense, that would not justify its retention of the Gaza Strip and West Bank. Under the UN Charter there can lawfully be no territorial gains from war, even by a state acting in self-defense. The response of other states to Israel's occupation shows a virtually unanimous opinion that even if Israel's action was defensive, its retention of the West Bank and Gaza Strip was not."

=== Arguments based on property rights and private ownership ===
On 30 January 2009, the Associated Press reported that Israeli political group Yesh Din plans to use a classified Israeli Government database to prove that many West Bank Israeli settlements were built on land privately owned by Palestinian citizens without compensation. (Note: "A comparative survey carried out by B'Tselem in the area of Ramallah revealed massive differences between the amount of land that Jordan defined as government property in areas registered before the occupation, and the amount that Israel declared state land in areas that the Jordanians had not managed to register prior to 1967. The results of the survey indicate that a significant proportion of the land that Israel declared as state land is actually private Palestinian property that was taken from its lawful owners through legal maneuvering, in breach of both local and international law." (B'Tselem 2017))

=== Rome Statute ===
According to Article 8 (2) (b) (viii) of the Rome Statute, "the transfer, directly or indirectly, by an Occupying Power of parts of its own civilian population to the territory it occupies (...)" is a war crime. According to Michael Bothe, this provision was adopted with a view to prosecutions over Israeli settlements. Israel's vote against the Rome Statute's adoption was explained on concerns that Article 8 (2) (b) (viii) would lead to Israel's occupation policy being ruled criminal. In 2017, the country adopted the Settlement Regulation Law despite concerns that it could lead to prosecutions at the International Criminal Court.

According to Michael Lynk, the United Nations Special Rapporteur on the situation of human rights in the Palestinian Territory occupied since 1967, "the Israeli settlements violate the absolute prohibition against the transfer by an occupying power of parts of its civilian population into an occupied territory". He therefore asked international community to designate the Israeli settlements creation as a war crime under the 1998 Rome Statute of the International Criminal Court.

In a 2020 article in Revue des droits de l'homme, Ghislain Poissonnier and Eric David state that "Israel’s establishment of settlements in the Occupied Palestinian Territory includes the elements of the war crime of Article 8 (2) (b) (viii) of the Rome Statute, namely its legal element, its material element and its mental element. It will therefore be easy for the Prosecutor of the International Criminal Court to establish the criminal responsibility of the Israeli leaders, who organize the settlement policy." International law expert Victor Kattan also views the settlements as illegal under the Rome Statute.

As part of the International Criminal Court investigation in Palestine, the criminality of the settlements is being investigated. The underlying facts are well-documented and not disputed, but establishing the court's temporal jurisdiction is less clear. Depending on its interpretation as an instantaneous, continuous or continuing crime, the establishment of settlements prior to 2014 (when the Rome Statute came into effect in Palestine) could also be prosecuted by the ICC. Government officials, legislators, military commanders, and corporate executives could all be prosecuted for their role in the establishment of settlements.

== Unauthorized or illegal outposts ==
In two cases decided shortly after independence (the Shimshon and Stampfer cases) the Israeli Supreme Court held that the fundamental rules of international law accepted as binding by all "civilized" nations were incorporated in the domestic legal system of Israel. The Nuremberg Military Tribunal had already determined that the articles annexed to the Hague IV Convention of 1907 were customary law, recognized by all civilized nations.

The Court determined in the 1979 Elon Moreh case that only the military commander of an area may requisition land according to article 52 of the Hague regulations. Military necessity had been an afterthought in the planning portions of the Elon Moreh settlement. That situation did not fulfill the precise strictures laid down in the articles of the Hague Convention, so the Court ruled the requisition order had been invalid and illegal.

In subsequent cases, such as the Ja'amait Ascan case regarding a project to link West Bank towns to Jerusalem with a four-way highway network, the Court ruled that Article 43 of the Hague IV Convention is a mandatory planning consideration for approval of building projects in the West Bank. The convention established that an occupier may not take into consideration "the national, economic or social interests of his own country, unless they have implications for his security interests or the interests of the local population." Justice Aharon Barak ruled against the Palestinian plaintiff, and for the project, accepting the claim by respondents that while it would benefit the residents of Israel, it would also favour the interests of West Bank Arabs commuting to Israel.

Pressured by the United States, the Sharon administration commissioned the Sasson Report, which found that the Israeli government had funded the creation of Jewish settler outposts in the West Bank that were unauthorized and in violation of stated government policy. According to the report, the Housing and Construction Ministry, the World Zionist Organization, the Education Ministry and the Defense Ministry cooperated to "systematically establish illegal settlement points", paying millions of dollars to create the infrastructure for scores of settlements.

The summary of the Sasson Report explains that local law requires the fulfillment of a number of basic conditions before establishing a settlement in the West Bank. It lists four preconditions that must be fulfilled in each case. The second precondition regarding title to the land cites the precedent established in the Elon Moreh case. The third precondition is that a settlement can only be established according to a lawfully designed building scheme, which has the power to produce a building permit. The fourth precondition is that the bounds of jurisdiction of the settlement must be determined in advance by order of the Commander of the area. The Israeli Supreme Court has ruled that the fulfillment of the applicable Hague IV Convention criteria is a mandatory and integral part of satisfying those three preconditions of the local law. Sasson summed up the situation by explaining:

An unauthorized outpost is a settlement which does not fulfill at least one of the above mentioned conditions. And I must emphasize: an unauthorized outpost is not a "semi legal" outpost. Unauthorized is illegal.

The report found "blatant violations of the law" by officials and state institutions. Many of the more than 100 outposts investigated added at state expense paved roads, permanent housing, power lines and other infrastructure. According to the report, some of the outposts were established on private lands owned by Palestinians with the help of Housing Ministry architects, the Housing Ministry funded many of the trailers used to start the outposts, and Defence Ministry officials allocated such private land to the quasi-official Jewish Agency.

As part of the 2003 "Road map" for peace, Israel committed itself to remove about two dozen such settlements, an obligation it has yet to fulfill.

In response to settler violence directed towards Israeli security forces, Israel declared it would no longer fund unauthorized outposts from November 2008. Settlers claim the violence was sparked by the beating of a settler child; border police spokesman Moshe Pinchi said he had no knowledge of the alleged beating and accused the settlers of "cynically" sending minors to attack the police. However, there is evidence that support continues unabated for illegal outposts. At one unauthorized settlement, Eli, there has been recent work on a new road that cuts through Palestinian territory.

In May 2009, Defense Minister Ehud Barak said that over two dozen illegal outposts in the West Bank had been "declared as such by the Talia Sasson Commission", and would be dismantled.

On 17 August 2009, four members of Netanyahu's cabinet — Deputy Prime Minister and Minister of Internal Affairs Eli Yishai (Shas), Vice Prime Minister and Minister of Strategic Affairs Moshe Ya'alon (Likud), Minister of Information Yuli Edelstein (Likud), and Minister of Science and Technology Daniel Hershkowitz (The Jewish Home) — embarked on a tour of West Bank outposts. During the tour, Yishai stated that the outposts are not illegal:

The people of Israel should know that these settlements [outposts] are legal. If someone thinks otherwise and plans to evacuate them, it will have to be approved by the cabinet. You cannot just evacuate people from their homes without due process.

== See also ==
- Israeli law in the West Bank settlements
- House demolition in the Israeli–Palestinian conflict
- International law and the Arab–Israeli conflict
- West Bank Areas in the Oslo II Accord

== Sources ==
- "69 Security Council Resolution 465 -1980- on the situation in the territories- 1 March 1980". Historical Documents. Israeli Ministry of Foreign Affairs.
- "A/RES/67/24. Jerusalem" (PDF). United Nations General Assembly. 30 November 2012.
- "A/RES/ES-10/15. Advisory opinion of the International Court of Justice on the Legal Consequences of the Construction of a Wall in the Occupied Palestinian Territory, including in and around East Jerusalem". United Nations General Assembly. 2 August 2004. Archived from the original on 17 May 2006.
- Adelman, Howard; Barkan, Elazar (2011). No Return, No Refuge: Rites and Rights in Minority Repatriation. Columbia University Press. ISBN 978-0-231-15336-2.
- Adem, Seada Hussein (2019). "Case Selection and Crimes Under the Rome Statute". Palestine and the International Criminal Court. T.M.C. Asser Press. pp. 144–145. ISBN 978-94-6265-291-0.
- Adler, Gerald M. (20 August 2003). "Israel and Iraq: United Nations Double Standards - UN Charter Article 25 and Chapters VI and VII" (PDF). middle-east-info.org.
- Albin, Cecilia (2001). Justice and Fairness in International Negotiation. Cambridge University Press. ISBN 978-0-521-79725-2.
- Baker, Alan (5 January 2011). "The Settlements Issue: Distorting the Geneva Convention and the Oslo Accords". Jerusalem Center for Public Affairs.
- Barak-Erez, Daphne (1 July 2006). "Israel: The security barrier—between international law, constitutional law, and domestic judicial review". International Journal of Constitutional Law. 4 (3): 540–552. doi:10.1093/icon/mol021.
- Beaumont, Peter (23 December 2016). "US abstention allows UN to demand end to Israeli settlements". The Guardian.
- Ben-Naftali, Orna; Sfard, Michael; Viterbo, Hedi (2018). The ABC of the OPT: A Legal Lexicon of the Israeli Control over the Occupied Palestinian Territory. Cambridge University Press. ISBN 978-1-107-15652-4.
- Benvenisti, Eyal (2012). The International Law of Occupation. Oxford University Press. ISBN 978-0-199-58889-3.
- Benvenisti, Eyal; Zamir, Eyal (April 1995). "Private Claims to Property Rights in the Future Israeli-Palestinian Settlement". The American Journal of International Law. 89 (2): 295–340. doi:10.2307/2204205. JSTOR 2204205. S2CID 145317224.
- Blecher, Martin (2018). Israeli Settlements: Land Politics beyond the Geneva Convention. Rowman & Littlefield. ISBN 978-0-761-87065-4.
- Blum, Yehuda (1971). Secure Boundaries and Middle East Peace. Hamakor Press.
- Brinton, Wlliam B (1979). "Israel: What Is Occupied Territory – a Reply to the Legal Adviser". Harvard Journal of Law and Public Policy. 2: 207–232.
- "Britain: Israeli settlements are 'illegal' and 'obstacle' to peace". Haaretz. 3 November 2009. Archived from the original on 19 August 2018.
- Byron, Christine (2013). War Crimes and Crimes Against Humanity in the Rome Statute of the International Criminal Court. Cambridge University Press. ISBN 978-1-847-79275-4.
- Cameron, Lindsey; Chetail, Vincent (2013). Privatizing War: Private Military and Security Companies under Public International Law. Cambridge University Press. ISBN 978-1-107-32868-6.
- "Canadian Policy on Key Issues in the Israeli-Palestinian Conflict". Foreign Affairs and International Trade Canada. 4 March 2018. Archived from the original on 18 February 2018.
- Cassese, Antonio (1986). "Considerations on the International Status of Jerusalem". In Kassim, Anis F. (ed.). The Palestine Yearbook of International Law. Vol. 3. Martinus Nijhoff Publishers. pp. 13–40. ISBN 978-9-041-10340-6.
- Charania, Shehzad (27 July 2016). "A Life of Legal Principle, Not of Politics – An Interview with Theodor Meron". Justice in Conflict.
- Cohen, Esther Rosalind (1985). Human rights in the Israeli-occupied territories, 1967–1982. Manchester University Press. ISBN 978-0-7190-1726-1.
- Cohen, Shaul Ephraim (1993). The Politics of Planting: Israeli-Palestinian Competition for Control of Land in the Jerusalem Periphery. University of Chicago Press. ISBN 978-0-226-11276-3.
- Coleman, Andrew (2014). Resolving Claims to Self-Determination: Is There a Role for the International Court of Justice?. Routledge. ISBN 978-1-135-11592-0.
- "Concern over Israel settlement exports". BBC. 5 November 2008.
- "Conference of High Contracting Parties to the Fourth Geneva Convention". International Committee of the Red Cross. 5 December 2001.
- "Conference of High Contracting Parties to the Fourth Geneva Convention Declaration" (PDF). 17 December 2014.
- "Consideration of Reports, Comments and Information Submnitted by State Parties under Article 9 of the Convention. 52nd session, 1250th Meeting". Committee on the Elimination of Racial Discrimination. 4 March 1998. Archived from the original on 9 March 2012 – via UNISPAL.
- "Convention (IV) relative to the Protection of Civilian Persons in Time of War". International Committee of the Red Cross. 12 August 1949.
- Cuyckens, Hanne (2017). Revisiting the Law of Occupation. Brill. ISBN 978-9-004-35397-8.
- DeYoung, Karen; Hendrix, Steve; Hudson, John (19 November 2019). "Trump administration says Israel's West Bank settlements do not violate international law". The Washington Post.
- "Disputed territories – Forgotten facts about the West Bank and Gaza strip". Israeli Ministry of Foreign Affairs. 1 February 2003.
- Domb, Fania (2007). "The Separation Fence in the International Court of Justice and the High Court of Justice: Commonalities, Differences and Specifics". In Schmitt, Michael; Pejic, Jelena (eds.). International Law and Armed Conflict: Exploring the Faultlines. Martinus Nijhoff Publishers. pp. 509–. ISBN 978-9-004-15428-5.
- "Double Standards: Israel ignores the United Nations and has weapons of mass destruction. So why all the fuss about Iraq?". The Economist. 10 October 2002.
- Drew, Catriona J. (1997). "Self-Determination, Population Transfer and the Middle East Peace Accords". In Bowen, Stephen (ed.). Human Rights, Self-Determination and Political Change in the Occupied Palestinian Territories. Martinus Nijhoff Publishers. pp. 119–167. ISBN 978-9-041-10502-8.
- Einhorn, Talia (2003). "The Status of Palestine/Land of Israel and Its Settlement Under Public International Law". Nativ. 1. Archived from the original on 1 September 2011.
- Eldar, Akiva (18 November 2011). "Israel effectively annexes Palestinian land near Jordan Valley". Haaretz. Archived from the original on 18 November 2011.
- "Emergency Special Session of General Assembly condemns Israel's failure to Cease Building of New Settlement in East Jerusalem". United Nations General Assembly. 15 July 1997.
- Erlanger, Steve (9 March 2005). "Israeli Report Condemns Support for Settlement Outposts". The New York Times.
- "EU says Israeli settlement on Palestinian territory is illegal". Reuters. 18 November 2019.
- "Europe Affirms Support for a Corpus Separatum for Greater Jerusalem". Settlement Report. Vol. 9, no. 7. Foundation for Middle East Peace. May 1999.
- Falk, Richard (Winter 2002). "Azmi Bishara, the Right of Resistance, and the Palestinian Ordeal". Journal of Palestine Studies. 31 (2): 19–33. doi:10.1525/jps.2002.31.2.19. JSTOR 10.1525/jps.2002.31.2.19.
- Forsythe, David (2005). The humanitarians: the International Committee of the Red Cross. Cambridge University Press. ISBN 978-0-521-84828-2.
- Franks, Tim (26 March 2009). "New support for West Bank outpost movement". BBC.
- Friedman, Matti (30 January 2009). "Group: Settlement info implicates Israeli gov't". Associated Press. Archived from the original on 20 February 2011.
- "Full text of Pompeo's statement on settlements". The Times of Israel. 19 November 2019.
- Galchinsky, Michael (Fall 2004). "The Jewish Settlements in the West Bank: International Law and Israeli Jurisprudence". Israel Studies. 9 (3): 115–136. doi:10.2979/ISR.2004.9.3.115. JSTOR 30245641. S2CID 144282494.
- Gelvin, James L. (2007). The Israel-Palestine conflict: one hundred years of war. Cambridge University Press. ISBN 978-0-521-88835-6.
- Gerson, Allan (2012) [First published 1978]. Israel, the West Bank and International Law. Routledge. ISBN 978-1-136-27760-3.
- Gold, Dore (2009). The Fight for Jerusalem: Radical Islam, the West, and the Future of the Holy City. Regnery Publishing. ISBN 978-1-596-98102-7.
- Gorenberg, Gershom (2007). The Accidental Empire: Israel and the Birth of the Settlements, 1967-1977. Macmillan Publishers. ISBN 978-1-466-80054-0.
- Gorenberg, Gershom (5 July 2012). "No, Israel Didn't Offer to Trade the West Bank for Peace in 1967". The Daily Beast.
- Grief, Howard (2008). The Legal Foundation and Borders of Israel Under International Law: A Treatise on Jewish Sovereignty Over the Land of Israel. Mazo Publishers. ISBN 978-9-657-34452-1.
- Gunneflo, Markus (2016). Targeted Killing: A Legal and Political History. Cambridge University Press. ISBN 978-1-107-11485-2.
- Hansel, Herbert J. (2014). "State Department Legal Advisor's letter to the Congress Concerning the Legality of Israeli Settlements in the Occupied Territories, 21 April 1978". In Moore, John Norton (ed.). The Arab-Israeli Conflict, Volume IV, Part I: The Difficult Search for Peace (1975–1988). Princeton University Press. pp. 203–208. ISBN 978-1-400-86197-2.
- Helmreich, Jeffrey (19 January 2003). "Diplomatic and Legal Aspects of the Settlement Issue". Jerusalem Center for Public Affairs. Archived from the original on 14 June 2006.
- Henckaerts, Jean-Marie; Doswald-Beck, Louise; Alvermann, Carolin (2005). Starvation and Access to Humanitarian Relief Customary International Humanitarian Law: pt. 1–2. Practice. Cambridge University Press. ISBN 978-0-521-83937-2.
- Hiro, Dilip (2013) [First published 1982]. Inside the Middle East. Routledge. ISBN 978-1-135-04815-0.
- Holzman-Gazit, Yifat (2016). Land Expropriation in Israel: Law, Culture and Society. Routledge. ISBN 978-1-317-10836-8.
- "How to Respond to Common Misstatements About Israel: Israeli Settlements". Anti-Defamation League. 17 February 2006. Archived from the original on 12 April 2010.
- "Implementation of the Fourth Geneva Convention in the occupied Palestinian territories: history of a multilateral process (1997–2001)". International Committee of the Red Cross. 30 September 2002.
- "The International Criminal Court Background Paper". Israeli Ministry of Foreign Affairs. 30 July 1998.
- "International Labour Conference, 93rd Session. Report of the Director-General, Appendix: The situation of workers of the occupied Arab territories" (PDF). Geneva: International Labour Organization. 2005.
- "Israel and Palestine: Events of 2017". Human Rights Watch. 2018.
- "Israel cuts aid to outposts over settler violence". ABC News. 10 November 2019. Archived from the original on 6 November 2008.
- "Israel, the Conflict and Peace: Answers to frequently asked questions". Israeli Ministry of Foreign Affairs. 1 November 2007.
- "Israel/Occupied Territories: Removing unlawful Israeli settlements in the Occupied Territories: Time to act" (PDF). Amnesty International. 25 March 2005.
- "Israel: 'Illegal outposts' Contaminating West Bank Water Supplies". Ma'an News Agency. 1 October 2008. Archived from the original on 28 September 2011.
- "Israeli Settlements and International Law". Israeli Ministry of Foreign Affairs. 20 May 2001.
- "Israeli settlements: UN Security Council calls for an end". BBC News. 23 December 2016.
- "Israeli settlements: US vetoes UNSC resolution". BBC News. 19 February 2011.
- "Israel's Settlements Have No Legal Validity, Constitute Flagrant Violation of International Law, Security Council Reaffirms: 14 Delegations in Favour of Resolution 2334 (2016) as United States Abstains". UN. 23 December 2016.
- "Israel's Settlements- Their Conformity with International Law". Israeli Ministry of Foreign Affairs. 1 December 1996.
- Jacques, Mélanie (2012). Armed Conflict and Displacement: The Protection of Refugees and Displaced Persons Under International Humanitarian Law. Cambridge University Press. ISBN 978-1-107-00597-6.
- "Jewish settlements no longer illegal - US". BBC News. 18 November 2019.
- Keinon, Herb (24 May 2009). "No new West Bank settlements". The Jerusalem Post.
- Kelly, Tobias (Winter 2006). "Jurisdictional Politics in the Occupied West Bank: Territory, Community, and Economic Dependency in the Formation of Legal Subjects". Law & Social Inquiry. 31 (1): 39–74. doi:10.1111/j.1747-4469.2006.00002.x. JSTOR 4092676. S2CID 144467492.
- Kerry, John (28 December 2016). "Remarks on Middle East Peace". United States Department of State.
- Kessler, Glenn (17 June 2009). "Old Legal Opinion Raises New Questions". The Washington Post.
- Kretzmer, David (January 2005). "The Advisory Opinion: The Light Treatment of International Humanitarian Law". The American Journal of International Law. 99 (1): 88–102. doi:10.2307/3246092. JSTOR 3246092. S2CID 145442406.
- Kretzmer, David (2009). "International Law in Domestic Courts: Israel". In Sloss, David (ed.). The Role of Domestic Courts in Treaty Enforcement: A Comparative Study. Cambridge University Press. pp. 273–324. ISBN 978-1-139-48334-6.
- Kretzmer, David (2012). The Occupation of Justice: The Supreme Court of Israel and the Occupied Territories. SUNY Press. ISBN 978-0-791-48880-5.
- Laham, Nicholas (2004). Crossing the Rubicon: Ronald Reagan and U.S. policy in the Middle East. Ashgate Publishing. ISBN 978-0-754-63961-9.
- Lazaroff, Tovah (17 August 2009). "Ministers urge PM to legalize outposts". The Jerusalem Post.
- Lederer, Edith M. (20 November 2019). "UN Security Council members rebuke US on Israel settlements". Associated Press.
- Legal Consequences of the Construction of a Wall in the Occupied Palestinian Territory (PDF). International Court of Justice. 9 July 2004. Archived from the original (PDF) on 13 September 2020.
- Leverett, Flynt; Leverett, Hillary Mann (1 July 2009). "A Road Map to Nowhere". Foreign Policy.
- Lukacs, Yehuda (1999). Israel, Jordan, and the Peace Process. Syracuse University Press. ISBN 978-0-8156-2855-2.
- Lustick, Ian (Autumn 1981). "Israel and the West Bank after Elon Moreh: The Mechanics of De Facto Annexation". Middle East Journal. 35 (4): 557–577. JSTOR 4326305.
- Macintyre, Donald (11 March 2006). "Israelis were warned on illegality of settlements in 1967 memo". The Independent.
- Madani, Iyad Ameen (24 November 2014). "Israelis were warned on illegality of settlements in 1967 memo" (PDF). Organisation of Islamic Cooperation.
- Mahler, Gregory S. (2016) [First published 2004]. Politics and government in Israel: the maturation of a modern state (3rd ed.). Rowman & Littlefield. ISBN 978-0-7425-1611-3.
- Mark, Clyde (2001). "Palestinians and Middle East Peace: Issues for the United States". In Canfield, John V. (ed.). The Middle East in Turmoil. Nova Publishers. pp. 1–18. ISBN 978-1-590-33160-6.
- McHugo, John (October 2002). "Resolution 242: A Legal Interpretation of the Right-Wing Israeli Interpretation of the Withdrawal Phrase With Reference to the Conflict Between Israel and the Palestinians". The International and Comparative Law Quarterly. 51 (4): 851–881. doi:10.1093/iclq/51.4.851. JSTOR 3663190. S2CID 145414979.
- Migdalovitz, Carol (29 January 2010). Israeli-Arab Negotiations: Background, Conflicts, and U.S. Policy (PDF). Congressional Research Service. pp. 1–18.
- Mitnick, Joshua (28 November 2008). "Israeli court rebukes state over illegal outposts". The Christian Science Monitor.
- Morris, Harvey (9 March 2005). "Israeli Report Hits at Funding for Settlements". Financial Times.
- Movement, Non-Aligned (25 February 2003). "Statement of the XIII Non-Aligned Movement Summit on Palestine". NAMXIII/Summit/Statement Palestine. Archived from the original on 27 July 2011.
- Mozgovaya, Natasha; Ravid, Barak (8 December 2009). "U.S.: Only Israel, Palestinians should decide Jerusalem's future". Haaretz. Archived from the original on 23 November 2010.
- "No veto: UN Security Council adopts anti-settlement resolution; U.S. abstains". Haaretz. 23 December 2016. Archived from the original on 24 December 2016.
- Osborne, Samuel (19 November 2019). "Israeli settlements are still illegal despite Trump backing them, says UN". The Independent.
- "Oslo Accords the Full Text". Archived from the original on 6 July 2011 – via historycentral.com.
- Pertile, Marco (2005). Conforti, Benedetto; Bravo, Luigi (eds.). ""Legal Consequences of the Construction of a Wall in the OPT": A Missed Opportunity for the Development of International Humanitarian Law?". Italian Yearbook of International Law. 14: 121–161. doi:10.1163/221161304X00064. ISBN 978-90-04-15027-0.
- Playfair, Emma (1992). International Law and the Administration of Occupied Territories. Clarendon Press. ISBN 978-0-198-25297-9.
- Quigley, John (1997). "The P.L.O-Israeli Interim Arrangements and the Geneva Civilians Convention". In Bowen, Stephen (ed.). Human Rights, Self-Determination and Political Change in the Occupied Palestinian Territories. Martinus Nijhoff Publishers. pp. 25–45. ISBN 978-9-041-10502-8.
- Quigley, John (1999). "Judicial Protection in Israeli-Occupied Territories". In Gibney, Mark; Frankowski, Stanlislaw (eds.). Judicial Protection of Human Rights: Myth or Reality?. Praeger. pp. 69–97. ISBN 978-0-275-96011-7.
- Quigley, John (2002). "Palestine: The Issue of Statehood". In Silverburg, Sanford R. (ed.). Palestine and International Law: Essays on Politics and Economics. McFarland & Company. pp. 37–54. ISBN 978-0-786-44248-5.
- Quigley, John (2005). The Case for Palestine. Duke University Press. ISBN 978-0-822-33539-9.
- Quigley, John (2013). The Six-Day War and Israeli self-defense: questioning the legal basis for preventive war. Cambridge; New York: Cambridge University Press. pp. 181–182. ISBN 9781107032064.
- Rabinowitz, Dan (28 March 2012). "17: Identity, the State and Borderline Disorder". In Wilson, Thomas M.; Donnan, Hastings (eds.). A Companion to Border Studies. John Wiley & Sons. pp. 307–308. ISBN 978-1-118-25525-4.
- Report of the Human Rights Council: Second Session (18 September - 6 October and 27-29 November 2006). United Nations Publications. 19 October 2007. ISBN 978-9-218-20022-8.
- Roberts, Adam (Summer 1988). "Decline of Illusions: The Status of the Israeli-Occupied Territories over 21 Years". International Affairs. 64 (3): 345–359. doi:10.2307/2622845. JSTOR 2622845.
- Roberts, Adam (January 1990). "Prolonged Military Occupation: The Israeli-Occupied Territories Since 1967". American Journal of International Law. 84 (1): 44–103. doi:10.2307/2203016. JSTOR 2203016. S2CID 145514740.
- Rostow, Eugene (23 April 1990). "Bricks and stones: settling for leverage; Palestinian autonomy". The New Republic. Archived from the original on 4 February 2010.
- Rostow, Eugene (21 October 1991). "Resolved: are the settlements legal?". The New Republic.
- Rozen, Laura (2 November 2009). "Clinton walks back Israel settlements remarks". Politico.com.
- Sanger, David E. (28 December 2016). "Kerry Rebukes Israel, Calling Settlements a Threat to Peace". The New York Times.
- Sasson, Talia (10 March 2005). "Summary of the Opinion Concerning Unauthorized Outposts-Talya Sason, Adv". Israeli Ministry of Foreign Affairs.
- Schmidt, Yvonne (2008). Foundations of Civil and Political Rights in Israel and the Occupied Territories. de:GRIN Verlag. ISBN 978-3-638-94450-2.
- Segev, Tom (2007). 1967: Israel, the War, and the Year that Transformed the Middle East. Henry Holt and Company. ISBN 978-1-429-91167-2.
- Sengupta, Somini; Gladstone, Rick (23 December 2016). "Rebuffing Israel, U.S. Allows Censure Over Settlements". The New York Times.
- "Settlements". B'Tselem. 11 November 2017.
- Sherwood, Harriet (14 May 2012a). "Israel putting any two-state peace deal at risk, says EU". The Guardian.
- Sherwood, Harriet (19 December 2012b). "UN security council's EU members to condemn Israeli settlements expansion". The Guardian.
- Slonim, Shlomo (1998). Jerusalem in America's Foreign Policy: 1947 – 1997. Martinus Nijhoff Publishers. ISBN 978-9-041-11039-8.
- "The status of West Bank settlements under international law". Balfour Project. 25 November 2019.
- Stone, Julius (2004). Lacey, Ian (ed.). International Law and the Arab-Israel Conflict: Extracts from "Israel and Palestine Assault on the Law of Nations" by Professor Julius Stone (2nd ed.). Jirlac Publications. ISBN 978-0-975-10730-0.
- Team, RAND Palestinian State Study (2007). Building a successful Palestinian state (PDF). Rand Corporation. ISBN 978-0-833-03532-5.
- "UN 'regrets' new US position on legality of Israeli settlements". United Nations. 19 November 2019.
- UN Security Council (24 December 2016). "Israel's Settlements Have No Legal Validity, Constitute Flagrant Violation of International Law, Security Council Reaffirms – Resolution 2334 (2016)". ReliefWeb.
- "Venice Declaration" (PDF). 13 June 1980.
- de Waart, Paul J. I. M. (October 2005). "International Court of Justice Firmly Walled in the Law of Power in the Israeli–Palestinian Peace Process". Leiden Journal of International Law. 18 (3): 467–487. doi:10.1017/S0922156505002839. S2CID 145200652.
- Weiss, Efrat (17 August 2009). "Yishai says outposts not illegal". Ynetnews. Ynet.
- Wilner, Michael (25 December 2016). "Analysis: US consistent against settlements — and against UN as appropriate venue". The Jerusalem Post.
- "Yes, Israel 'occupies' West Bank, US says". Agence France-Presse. 31 March 2021. Archived from the original on 1 April 2021.
