= ALQ =

ALQ may refer to:

- Anterior Lateral System, also known as the Spinothalamic tract
- Arab Law Quarterly, a legal magazine
- Alegrete Airport, Brazil (by IATA code)
- Armée de libération du Québec, a military wing of the Front de libération du Québec

== See also ==
- Algonquin language (ISO code "alq")
