= Victor Kattan =

British-Palestinian legal academic

Victor Kattan FHEA
- Born: Victor Matthew Kattan; November 1979 (age 46); Khartoum, Sudan
- Education: Brunel University London LLB; Leiden University LLM; SOAS, University of London PhD

Victor Matthew Kattan FHEA (born November 1979) is a British legal academic. He is an Assistant Professor of Public International Law at the University of Nottingham. He previously held positions at the National University of Singapore (NUS) and SOAS University of London.

Kattan has authored a monograph, five edited volumes, and over 30 journal articles. His law practice is based at Temple Garden Chambers. In 2017, Kattan won the inaugural Asian Journal of International Law Young Scholar Prize.

== Early life and education ==
Kattan was born in Khartoum, Sudan to a Palestinian father William from Bethlehem and a British mother Josephine and grew up in Hertfordshire.

Kattan attended St Hugh's Preparatory School and St Edmund's College, Ware, completing his A Levels in 1998. He was a member of Mayne House at the former and Poynter House at the latter. Kattan graduated with a Bachelor of Laws (LLB) from Brunel University London in 2001 and a Master of Laws (LLM) from Leiden University in 2002. He later completed a PhD in International Law at SOAS University of London in 2012.

== Career ==
Kattan began his career in 2003 working for BADIL, followed by Arab Media Watch in 2004 and then the British Institute of International and Comparative Law from 2006 to 2008. In his final year at the latter, he published his first edited book The Palestine Question in International Law. Kattan subsequently joined SOAS University of London as a Teaching Fellow. The following year in 2009, Kattan's monograph From Coexistence to Conquest: International Law and the Origins of the Arab-Israeli Conflict 1891-1949 was published. The book makes the legal case for Palestinian self-determination and analyses the U.N. Partition Plan, Palestinians' objections, and the Nakba through the lens of international law.

After completing his PhD in 2012, Kattan served in as a legal adviser to the Palestinian Negotiations Support Project in Ramallah. He was a 2013–2015 Postdoctoral Fellow at the National University of Singapore's (NUS) Faculty of Law. He was then promoted to Associate Fellow there as well as Senior Research Fellow at the university's Middle East Institute. In 2017, Kattan won the inaugural Asian Journal of International Law Young Scholar Prize for his article "Decolonizing the International Court of Justice: The Experience of Judge Sir Muhammad Zafrulla Khan in the South West Africa Cases". He also became an Associate Member of Temple Garden Chambers. Kattan co-edited the 2019 book Violent Radical Movements in the Arab World: The Ideology and Politics of Non-State Actors with Peter Sluglett (published posthumously, in Sluglett's case).

In 2020, Kattan joined the University of Nottingham's School of Law as Senior Research Fellow and then Associate Professor of International Law in 2023. Kattan co-edited two 2023 books: Making Endless War: The Vietnam and Arab-Israeli Conflicts in the History of International Law with Brian Cuddy and The Breakup of India and Palestine: The Causes and Legacies of Partition with Amit Ranjan.

In 2025, Kattan's recommendations regarding recognition of the state of Palestine and foreign aid were cited by the House of Commons' Foreign Affairs Select Committee's Report. Currently, he is representing a group of Palestinian families who have legally petitioned the British government to issue an apology for "violence, exile or repression" experienced during the British mandate period.

== Bibliography ==
=== Monographs ===
- From Coexistence to Conquest: International Law and the Origins of the Arab-Israeli Conflict 1891-1949 (2009)

=== Edited volumes ===
- The Palestine Question in International Law (2008)
- Violent Radical Movements in the Arab World: The Ideology and Politics of Non-State Actors (2019), edited with Peter Sluglett
- Making Endless War: The Vietnam and Arab-Israeli Conflicts in the History of International Law (2023), co-edited with Brian Cuddy
- The Breakup of India and Palestine: The Causes and Legacies of Partition (2023), edited with Amit Ranjan

=== Chapters ===
- "The Netanyahu Doctrine”, the National Security Strategy of the United States of America, and the invasion of Iraq" in Human Rights and America’s War on Terror (2019), edited by Satvinder S. Juss
- "Jordan and Palestine: Union (1950) and Secession (1988)" in Research Handbook on Secession (2022), edited by Jure Vidmar, Sarah McGibbin and Lea Raible
- "Self-determination as ideology: The Cold War, the End of Empire, and the Making of UN General Assembly Resolution 1514 (14 December 1960)" in International Law and Time: Narratives and Techniques (2022), edited by Klara Polackova Van der Ploeg, Luca Pasquet and León Castellanos-Jankiewicz

=== Select academic articles ===
- "The Right of Return Revisited" in Mediterranean Journal of Human Rights (2004)
- "The Nationality of Denationalised Palestinians" in Nordic Journal of International Law (2005)
- "The Legality of the West Bank Wall: Israel’s High Court of Justice v. The International Court of Justice" in Vanderbilt Journal of Transnational Law (2007)
- "The Statehood of Palestine: International Law in the Middle East Conflict" in American Journal of International Law (2011)
- "Litigating ‘Palestine’ before International Courts and Tribunals: The Prospects of Success and Perils of Failure" in Hastings International and Comparative Law Review (2012)
- "The Implications of Joining the ICC after ‘Operation Protective Edge" in Journal of Palestine Studies (2014)
- "Palestine's Membership in the Commonwealth as a Contribution to a Lasting Peace in the Middle East" in The Round Table (2015)
- "The Ghosts of the Temple of Preah Vihear/ Phra Viharn in the 2013 Judgment" in Asian Journal of International Law (2015)
- "Decolonizing the International Court of Justice: The Experience of Judge Sir Muhammed Zafrulla Khan in the South West Africa cases" in Asian Journal of International Law (2015)
- "To Consent or Revolt? European Public Law, the Three Partitions of Poland (1772, 1793, and 1795) and the Birth of National Self-Determination" in Journal of the History of International Law (2015)
- "Palestine and the Secret Treaties" in American Journal of International (2016)
- "There was an elephant in the courtroom”: Reflections on the role of Judge Sir Percy Spender (1897-1985) in the South West Africa Cases (1960-1966) after half a century" in Leiden Journal of International Law (2018)
- "Israeli settlements, US foreign policy, and international law" in Insight Turkey (2020)
- "The United Kingdom's Views on Elections to the International Court of Justice during the Cold War" in Melbourne Journal of International Law (2021)
- "The UN Partition Plan for Palestine and International Law" in Oxford Bibliographies of International Law (2021)
- "The special role of the Hashemite Kingdom of Jordan in the Muslim holy shrines in Jerusalem" in Arab Law Quarterly (2021)
- "The Persistence of Partition: Boundary making, Imperialism and International Law" in Political Journal (2022)
- "Jerusalem" in Oxford Bibliographies of International Law (2023), with John B. Quigley
