= Nordic Journal of International Law =

Peer-reviewed journal

- First issue: 1930
- Website: Official website

Nordic Journal of International Law (Latin: Acta scandinavica juris gentium) is a peer-reviewed journal published by Dutch academic publisher Brill Nijhoff. It focuses on topics related to Nordic countries and its legal topics.

The first issue appeared in 1930.

== See also ==
- Retfærd
