= Opération Casernes =

ALQ robbery of a Canadian Army armoury

- Part of the FLQ Insurgency
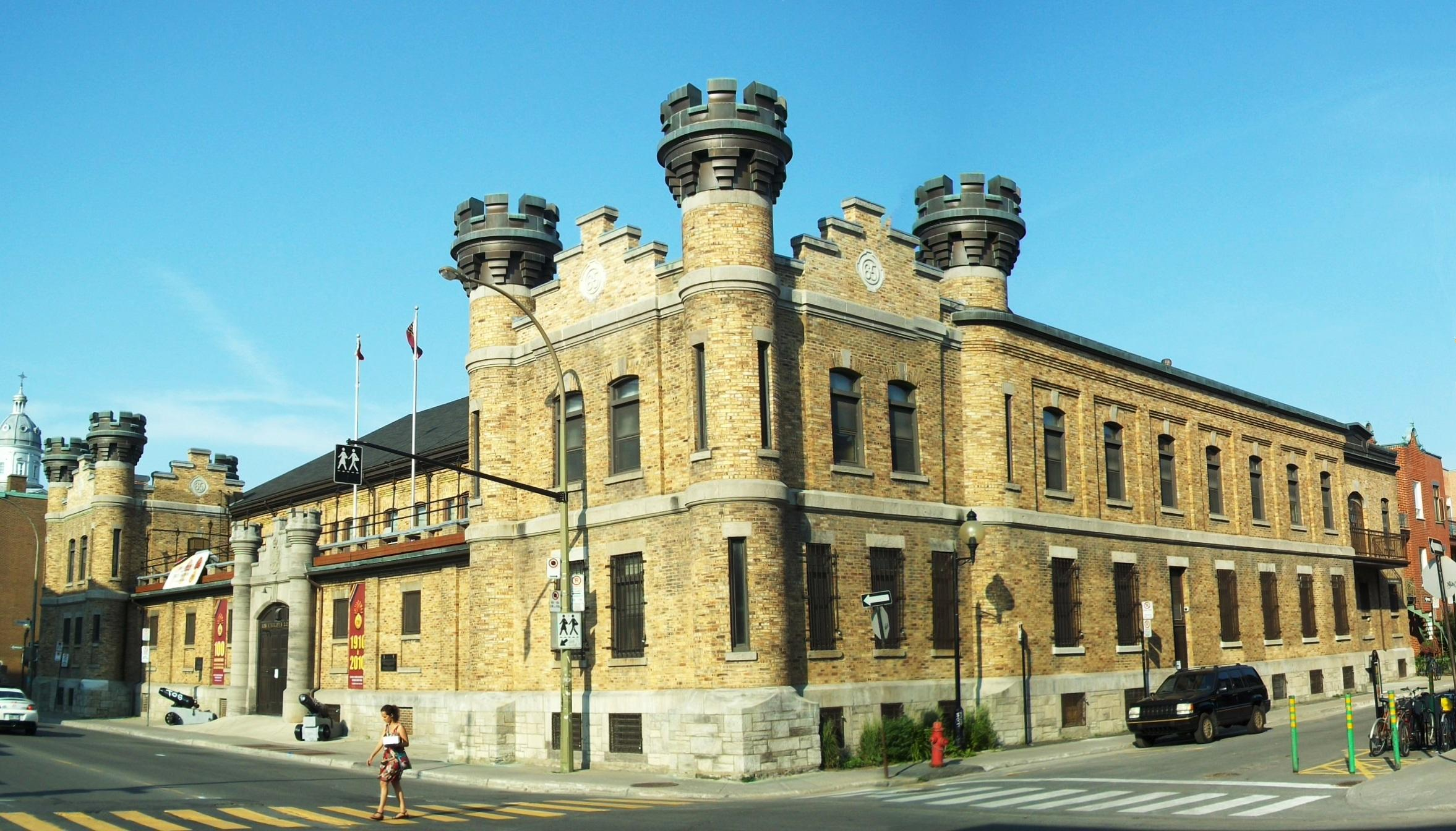
- Armoury of the Fusiliers Mont-Royal
Date	30 January 1964
Location	Montreal, Quebec, Canada
Result	FLQ victory: The ALQ steals multiple firearms

Belligerents
Canada	Front de libération du Québec

Units involved
Fusiliers Mont-Royal	Armée de libération du Québec

Casualties and losses
2 killed; Numerous firearms captured	Unknown

In the early morning of 30 January 1964, a military wing of the Front de libération du Québec known as the Armée de libération du Québec (English: Quebec Liberation Army) broke into the Fusiliers Mont-Royal's armoury in an operation dubbed Opération Casernes and stole numerous firearms.

== Break in ==
At 7:30 am on 30 January 1964, the ALQ broke into the armoury of the Fusiliers Mont-Royal in Montreal. The ALQ militants killed the nightwatchman, killed a member of the Corps of Commissionaires and captured 8 employees whom they tied up. Afterwards, the ALQ militants began taking firearms and ammunition. By 9:00 am, the ALQ had left with $20,000 in stolen firearms. This included 59 C1 rifles, 34 Sten guns, 4 Bren guns, 4 60-millimetre mortars, 3 bazooka rocket launchers, 5 revolvers, 13,000 .22 long rifle rounds, 2,300 .303 British rounds, 2,000 7.62×51mm NATO rounds and multiple grenades.

== Aftermath ==
The break-in caused soldiers to be deployed outside of all armouries in the Montreal metropolitan area the next day.
