= Retfærd =

- Discipline: Law
- Language: Scandinavian (Danish, Norwegian, Swedish), English
- Edited by: Ole Hammerslev

Publication details
- History: 1976-present
- Publisher: Association of Danish Lawyers and Economists (Denmark)
- Frequency: Quarterly

Standard abbreviations
- ISO 4: Retfærd

Indexing
- ISSN: 0105-1121

Links
- Journal homepage

Retfærd (Danish: "Justice"), subtitled Nordic Journal of Law and Justice, is a Nordic peer-reviewed academic journal of legal science, publishing research from a "theoretical and practical point of view on the basis of not only jurisprudence, but also sociology, criminology, political science, history, philosophy, economics, ecology, anthropology, feminism and other sciences." Principally oriented towards Scandinavia, it primarily publishes articles in the Scandinavian languages, but also publishes special issues in English with a broader international focus. The journal was established in 1976 and since 2002 is published by the Association of Danish Lawyers and Economists. It was formerly published by Universitetsforlaget/the Scandinavian University Press. The journal is ranked as a Level 2 journal, the highest level, in the official Norwegian ranking (the Norwegian Scientific Index).

The journal's editor-in-chief is Ole Hammerslev.
