= Armée de libération du Québec =

Quebec Liberation Army
- Armée de libération du Québec
- Active: 1 June 1963 – June 1964
- Branch: Front de libération du Québec
- Role: Guerrilla warfare
- Garrison/HQ: Outremont
- Engagements: FLQ Insurgency: Opération Casernes

The Quebec Liberation Army (French: Armée de libération du Québec) was a military wing of the Front de libération du Québec.

== History ==
=== Formation ===
The Armée de libération du Québec was formed on 1 June 1963 after the leaders of the FLQ divided the movement into two sections: a political section and a military section. The purpose of the ALQ was to supply the FLQ with money and firearms. The ALQ accomplished this by robbing barracks of the Canadian Army and local banks.

== Notable actions ==
On 30 January 1964, during Opération Casernes, the ALQ broke into the Fusiliers Mont-Royal's armoury in Montreal, subdued the nightwatchman along with a member of the Corps of Commissionaires and captured a small number of employees, whom they tied up. The ALQ stole 59 C1 rifles, 34 Sten guns, 4 Bren guns, 4 60-millimetre mortars, 3 bazooka rocket launchers, 5 revolvers, 13,000 .22 long rifle rounds, 2,300 .303 British rounds, 2,000 7.62×51mm NATO rounds and multiple grenades. This robbery caused soldiers to be deployed outside of all armouries in the Montreal metropolitan area the next day. Nineteen days later on 20 February 1963, the ALQ broke into the armoury of the 62nd Field Artillery Regiment, RCA, in Shawinigan and stole 33 Browning Hi-Power pistols, 12 transceivers, 1 mimeograph, combat uniforms and UN blue helmets. On the same day, the ALQ occupied a military building in Trois-Rivières for 3 1/2 hours and stole numerous rounds of ammunition.

On 9 April 1964, the Sûreté du Québec apprehended ALQ members Jean Lasalle, Jean Gagnon and René Dion after a failed robbery in Mont-Rolland. Between 21 April and 5 May, 5 other members of the ALQ were arrested.

== Disbandment ==
The ALQ was disbanded in June 1964 and reorganized into the Armée Révolutionnaire du Québec (ARQ) (English: Revolutionary Army of Quebec).
