= Howard Grief =

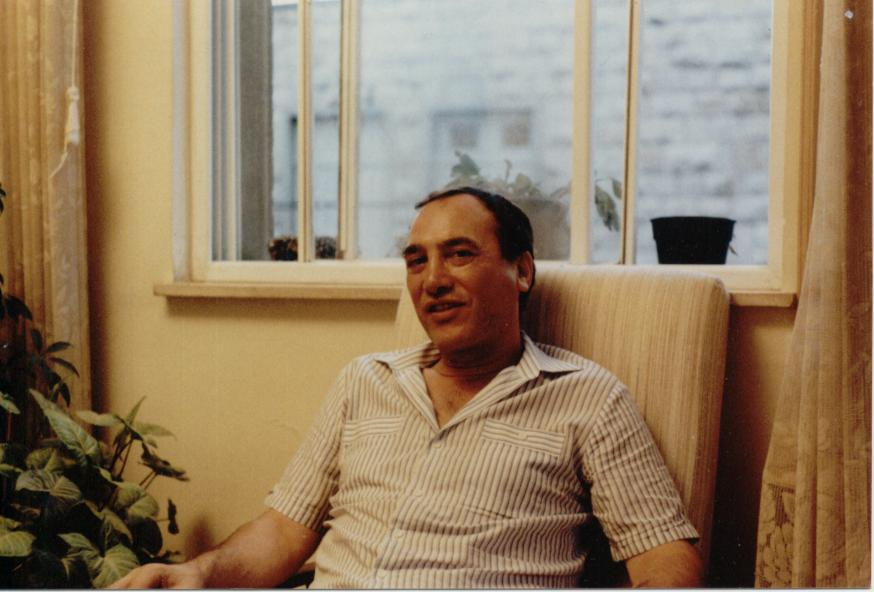
Howard Grief 1989

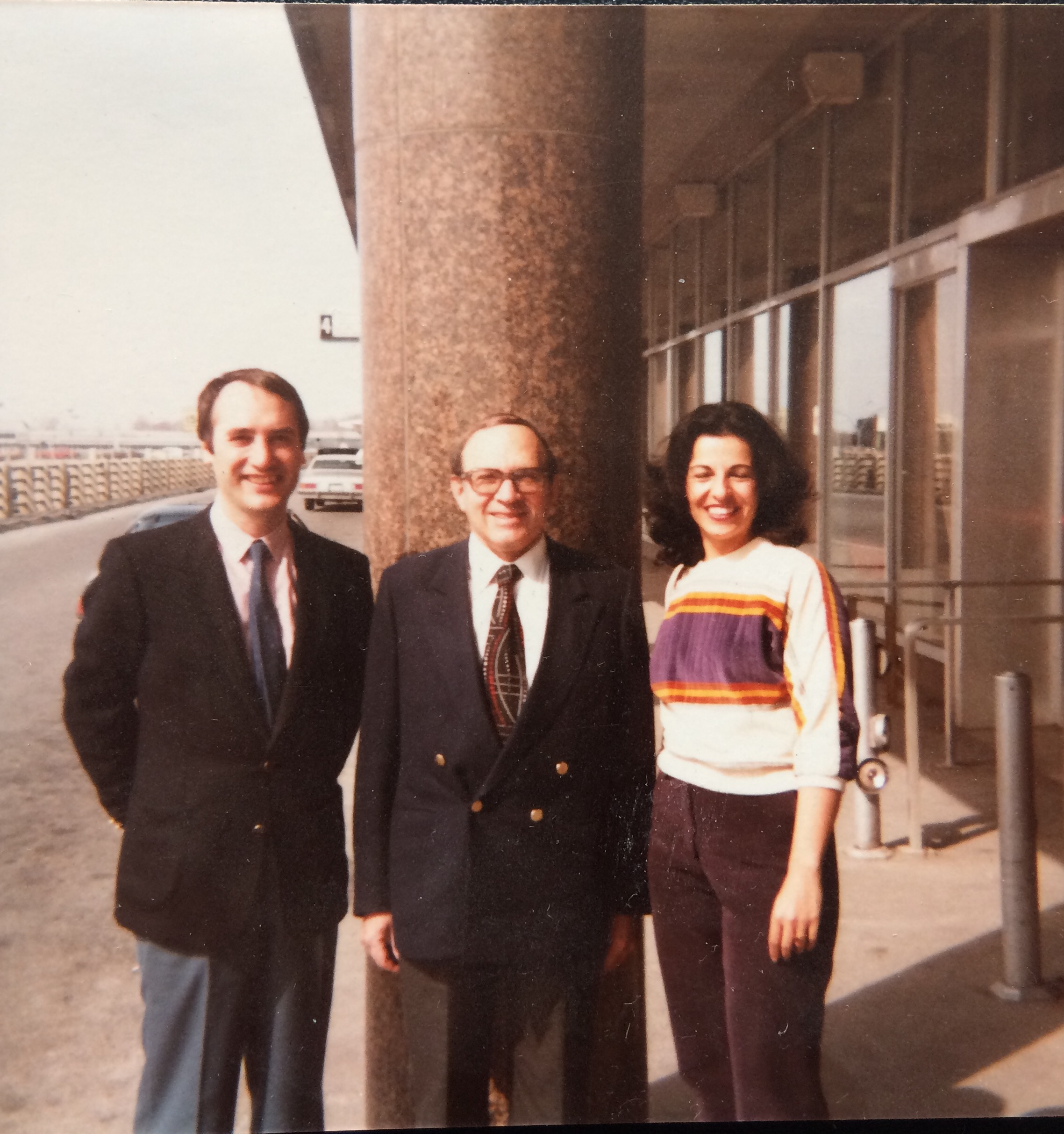
Yuval Neeman, Howard Grief and his wife Ilana

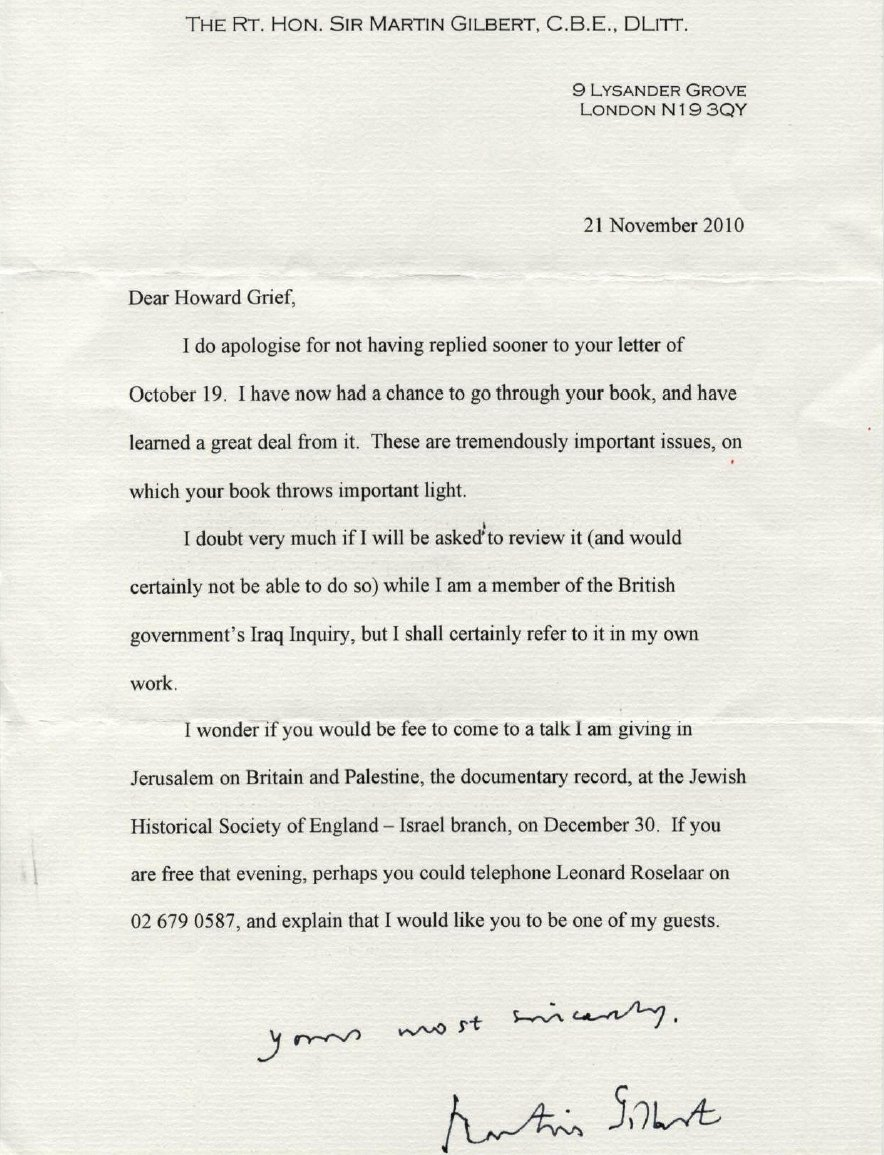
Letter sent by Sir Martin Gilbert to Howard Grief

Howard Grief (Hebrew: הווארד גריף; 19 April 1940 – 2 June 2013) was a Jerusalem-based attorney and notary born in Montreal, Quebec, Canada. He served as the adviser on Israel under international law to Yuval Ne'eman while Ne'eman was the Minister of Energy and Infrastructure in the Yitzhak Shamir Government.

== Biography ==
Howard Grief was born and educated in Montreal, Quebec, Canada where he attended Baron Byng High School, McGill University, and McGill Law School, obtaining degrees in Arts and Law. He became a member of the Bar of Quebec in 1966 and was a self-employed practicing attorney for 23 years, principally in the fields of civil and commercial law. In August 1989, Grief immigrated to Israel together with his Jerusalem-born wife and their two sons.

== Legal career ==
In May 1991, Grief was admitted to the Israel Bar Association and became a notary. In December 1991, he was appointed by Yuval Ne'eman, then Minister of Energy and Infrastructure in the Yitzhak Shamir Government, to be his legal adviser in international law on matters pertaining to the Land of Israel.

He petitioned the Israeli Supreme Court to annul the Oslo Accords in 1999, and advanced the thesis that de jure sovereignty over all of Palestine was devolved upon the Jewish People at the 1920 San Remo Peace conference.

== Views and opinions ==
In 1999, Grief presented the "Petition to Annul the Interim Agreement" to Israel's Supreme Court claiming that the agreements between Israel and the PLO were illegal both under constitutional and criminal Israeli law. The Supreme Court called the petition "a political position" and would not deal with it.

Grief drew attention to the wider scope of the 1920 San Remo conference, His thesis was that de jure sovereignty over the entire Land of Israel (Palestine) was vested in the Jewish People as a result of the reference to the Balfour Declaration, adopted at the San Remo Conference in April 1920. Grief maintained that Israeli politicians and jurists, including the authors of the 2012 Levy Report failed to grasp the full importance of the "San Remo Resolution", a term he coined to clarify his position, according to the Algemeiner.

Grief laid out his thesis in his 2008 book The Legal Foundation and Borders of Israel under International Law.

== Published works ==
- Article 80 and the UN Recognition of a “Palestinian State”, September 2011, algemeiner.com
- The Legal Foundation and Borders of Israel under International Law. Mazo Publishers, 2008 ISBN 978-965-7344-52-1 Google books
- Security Council Resolution 242: A Violation of Law and a Pathway to Disaster. ACPR Publications, 2008
- The Question of the Applicability of the Fourth Geneva Convention on Occupation to Judea, Samaria and Gaza. NATIV, 2008
- The Howard Grief Eretz-Israel letters to Meir Shamgar, 2005-2007: On Eretz-Israel and Israeli Constitutional Law (with Yoel Lerner). Office for Israeli Constitutional Law, 2007
- David Ben-Gurion’s Forgotten 1948 Land of Israel Proclamation for the Annexation of Judea and Samaria, NATIV, Vol.20/2007
- The Transfer of Jews Under Prime Minister Sharon's Unilateral Disengagement Plan, ACPR Publications, 2005
- The Origin of the Occupation Myth, NATIV, Vol.8/2005
- Legal Rights and Title of Sovereignty of the Jewish People to the Land of Israel and Palestine under International Law, NATIV, Vol.2/2004
- Why Military Limitations on a "Palestinian" State Will Fail: A Legal Assessment. Zmora-Bitan Publishers and ACPR Publishers, 2001
- A Petition to Annul the Interim Agreement. ACPR Publications, 1999
- The illegality of the Sharm e-Sheikh memorandum under Israeli law. ACPR Publications, 1999
- Why Israel Needs an Independent Counsel. Sanhedrin Institute, 1998
