= Yehuda Zvi Blum =

Israeli professor of law and diplomat (1931–2025)

- יהודה צבי בלום
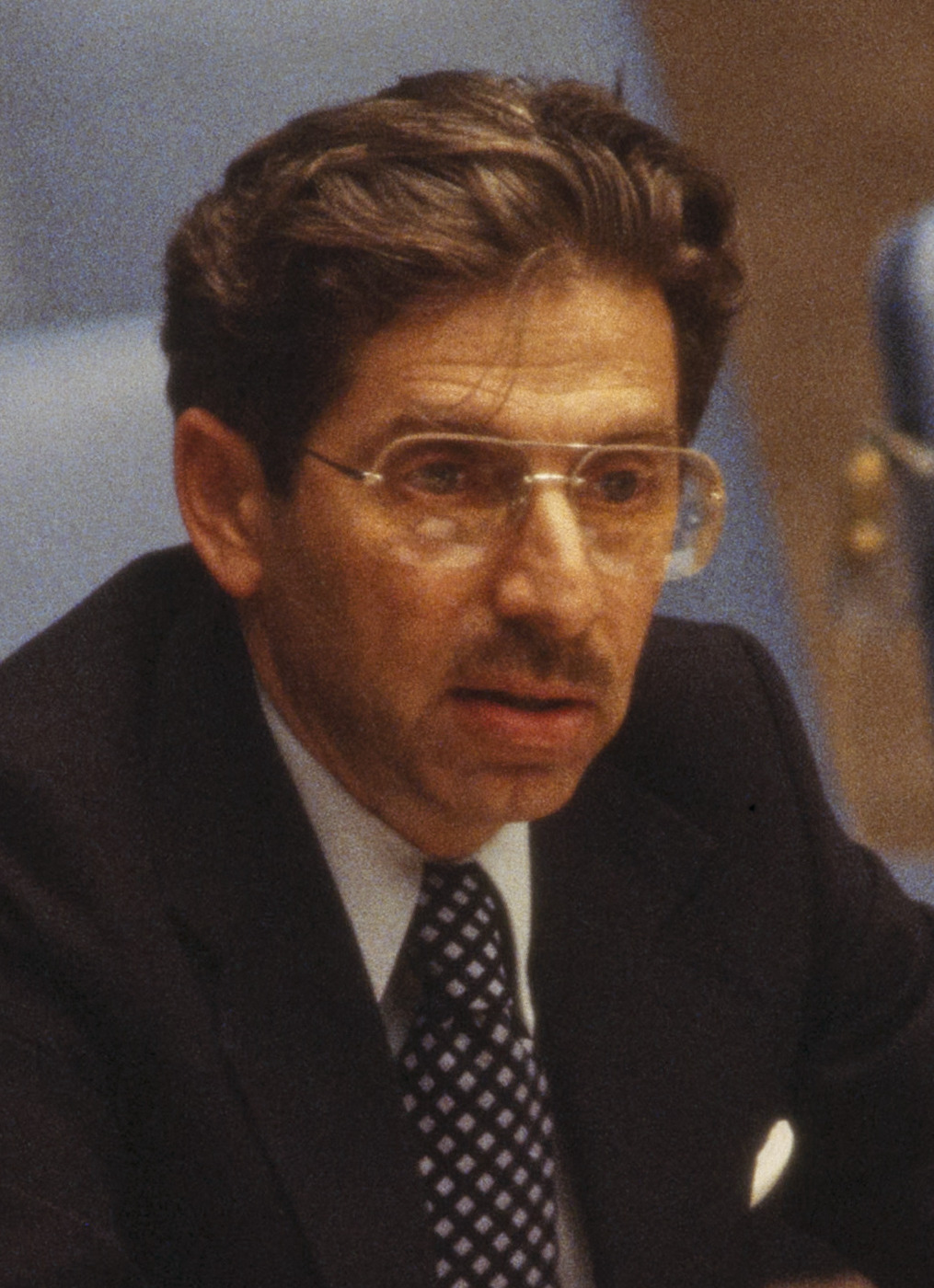

6th Permanent Representative of Israel to the United Nations
- In office 1978–1984
- Preceded by: Chaim Herzog
- Succeeded by: Benjamin Netanyahu

Personal details
- Born: 2 October 1931 Bratislava, Czechoslovakia (present-day Slovakia)
- Died: September 2025 (aged 93)
- Education: Hebrew University of Jerusalem

Yehuda Zvi Blum (Hebrew: יהודה צבי בלום; 2 October 1931 – September 2025) was an Israeli professor of law and diplomat who served as Permanent Representative of Israel to the United Nations from 1978 to 1984.

== Background ==
Yehuda Zvi Blum was born in Bratislava, Czechoslovakia on 2 October 1931, and observed his bar-mitzvah in the Bergen-Belsen concentration camp. He immigrated to British Mandate for Palestine in 1945. Blum earned his law degree from the University of London. His doctoral thesis, in 1961, was on Historic titles in international law.

Blum died in September 2025, at the age of 93.

== Law career ==
Blum joined the faculty of Hebrew University in 1965 and until retiring in 2001 occupied the Hersch Lauterpacht Chair in International Law there. He has served as a senior research scholar at the University of Michigan, and visiting professor in the law schools of the University of Texas, New York University, Tulane University, the USC Gould School of Law, and others. In 1968 he served as a UNESCO Fellow at the University of Sydney in Australia. Blum authored several books and published many scholarly articles on international legal problems in law journals in English, Hebrew, and German. At the time of his death in 2025 he was the law editor of the Encyclopaedia Hebraica.

== Diplomatic career ==
In 1968, Blum worked for the United Nations Office of Legal Counsel. He was a member of Israeli delegation to 3rd UN Conference on the Law of the Sea in 1973. In 1976 he was part of the Israeli delegation to the 31st session of UN General Assembly. He served as Ambassador and Permanent Representative of Israel to the United Nations for six years, from 1978 to 1984.

He was a member of the Israeli negotiating team that drafted the peace treaty with Egypt (Camp David Accords) in 1978, the Blair House negotiations in March 1979 and the Israeli legal team at the Taba arbitration talks between Israel and Egypt between 1986 and 1988.

As the Ambassador to the United Nations, Blum was often critical of it, saying that the UN "fans the flames of the Middle East conflict." The New York Times quoted him as saying that "The essence of the Middle East conflict has always been and remains the persistent enmity of Arab states towards the Jewish national renaissance." As UN envoy, he made headlines for "scolding" a group of 133 American Jewish law students protesting Israel's invasion of Lebanon and protesting Jewish settlements in West Bank and Gaza. He questioned the factual, as well as the moral position, of the students' view, saying that they "have not given the slightest indication of their willingness to bear any personal consequences of their patronizing and fortuitous advice."

== Published works ==
- Historic Titles in International Law (1965)
- Secure Boundaries and Middle East Peace (1971) (with an introduction by Julius Stone)
- For Zion's Sake (1987)
- Eroding the United Nations Charter (1993)
