= Arab Law Quarterly =

- Discipline: Law
- Language: English

Publication details
- Publisher: Brill Publishers (United Kingdom)
- Frequency: Quarterly

Standard abbreviations
- ISO 4: Arab Law Q.

Indexing
- ISSN: 0268-0556 (print); 1573-0255 (web)
- OCLC no.: 535488532

Links
- Journal homepage

The Arab Law Quarterly is an English language quarterly devoted to Arab law, covering both Sharia and secular law. The magazine was first published in September 1985. It is based in London and was published by Lloyd's of London in the past. It is now published by Brill Publishers.
