= List of people from Longueuil =

The following is a list of people from Longueuil, Quebec.

== A ==
- John Aird, banker

== B ==
- Micheline Beauchemin, textile artist and weaver
- Yves Beauchemin, novelist
- Jean Béliveau, former Montreal Canadiens center (1950–71); member of the Hockey Hall of Fame
- Marco Berthelot, curler
- Daniel Berthiaume, former ice hockey goaltender
- Marilou Bourdon, singer
- Rosario Bourdon, cellist, violinist, conductor, arranger and composer
- Max Boyer, professional wrestler
- Daniel Brabant, former baseball player
- Richard Brodeur, former National Hockey League goaltender, known as 'King Richard' with the Vancouver Canucks (1980–87)

== C ==
- Elisha Cuthbert, actor; played Kim Bauer on 24; grew up in Greenfield Park
- Steven Crowder, conservative political commentator on YouTube; grew up in Greenfield Park

== D ==
- André Dallaire
- Pierre Deniger, politician

== G ==
- Céline Galipeau, news presenter
- Garry Galley, former NHL player
- Bruno Gervais, professional ice hockey defenceman
- Claude Gladu, mayor
- Steve Green, professional baseball player

== H ==
- Benoit Huot, swimmer

== J ==
- Marlene Jennings, politician

== K ==
- Anthony Kavanagh, actor

== L ==
- Guy Laliberté, Cirque du Soleil founder and Chief Executive Officer
- Irina Lazareanu, model
- Patrick Leduc, soccer player

== M ==
- Anthony Mantha, NHL player of the Detroit Red Wings
- Marie-Victorin, Christian brother and botanist
- Pauline Marois, former Taillon MNA
- Julie Masse, singer
- Torrey Mitchell, NHL player
- Isabelle Morneau, soccer player

== N ==
- Craig Norman, basketball coach

== O ==
- Nils Oliveto, actor, screenwriter
- Jacques Olivier, former mayor

== P ==
- François Paré, author
- Kevin Parent, singer/songwriter
- André Pratte, journalist and economist
- Raymond Préfontaine, politician

== R ==
- Stéphane Roy, electroacoustic music composer

== S ==
- Caroline St-Hilaire, politician
- Myriane Samson, figure skater
- Julie Snyder, TV host

== T ==
- Maxime Talbot, Pittsburgh Penguins hockey player
- Jack Todd, Montreal Gazette columnist
