= CSMV =

CSMV may refer to:

- Community of St Mary the Virgin, an Anglican religious community of sisters based in Oxfordshire, England.
- Commission scolaire Marie-Victorin, a French-language school board in Quebec, Canada.
