= Jason Bay =

Canadian-American baseball player (born 1978)

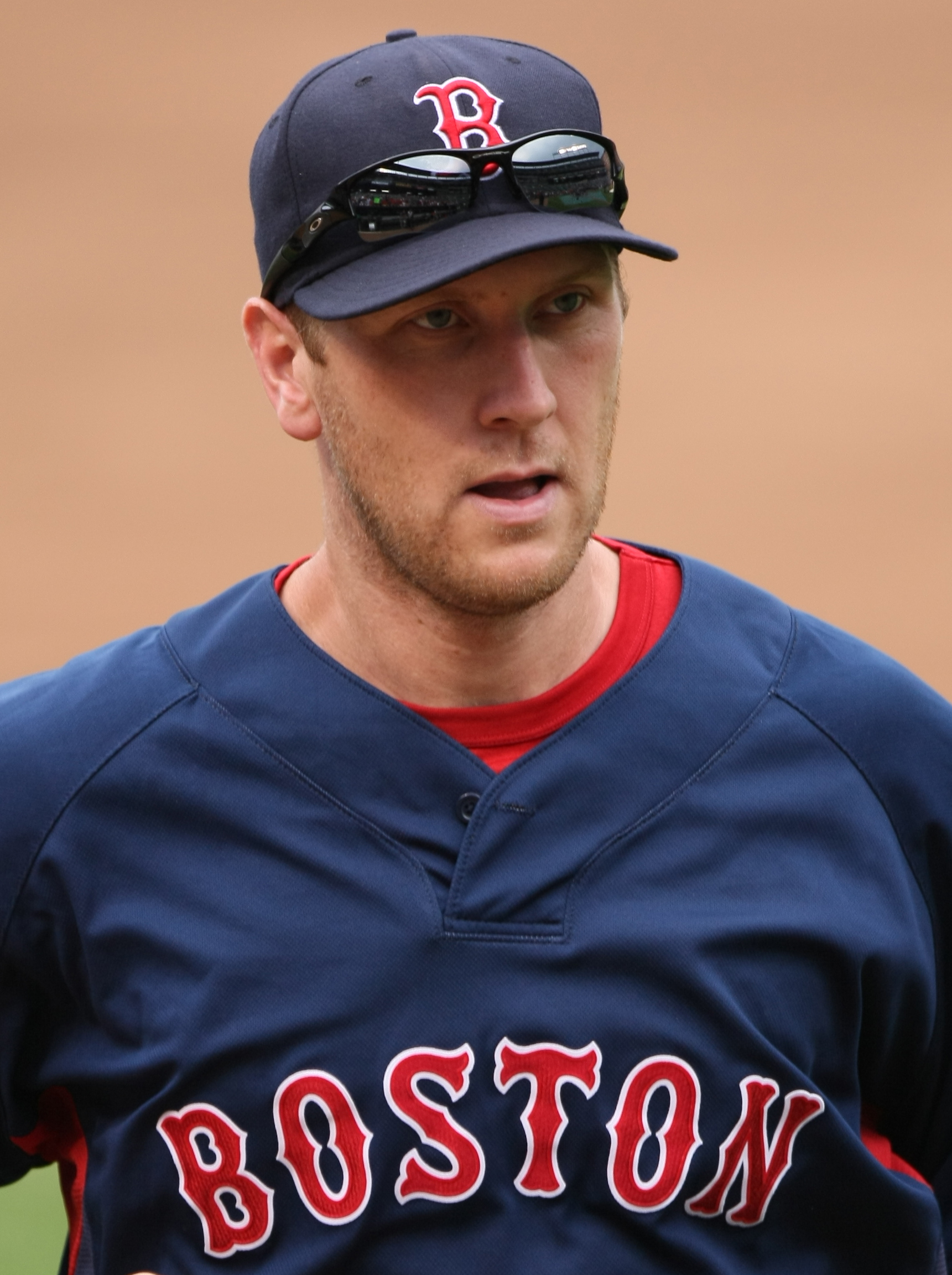
- Bay with the Boston Red Sox in 2009
- Left fielder
- Born: September 20, 1978 (age 47); Trail, British Columbia, Canada
- Batted: Right Threw: Right

MLB debut
- May 23, 2003, for the San Diego Padres

Last MLB appearance
- July 26, 2013, for the Seattle Mariners

MLB statistics
- Batting average: .266
- Home runs: 222
- Runs batted in: 754
- Stats at Baseball Reference

Teams
- San Diego Padres (2003); Pittsburgh Pirates (2003–2008); Boston Red Sox (2008–2009); New York Mets (2010–2012); Seattle Mariners (2013)

Career highlights and awards
- 3× All-Star (2005, 2006, 2009); NL Rookie of the Year (2004); Silver Slugger Award (2009)

Member of the Canadian

Baseball Hall of Fame
- Induction: 2019

Jason Raymond Bay (born September 20, 1978) is a Canadian-American former professional baseball left fielder who played 11 seasons in Major League Baseball (MLB). Initially drafted by the Montreal Expos, he played for the San Diego Padres, Pittsburgh Pirates, Boston Red Sox, New York Mets and Seattle Mariners.

Bay was the National League Rookie of the Year in 2004 and he won the Silver Slugger Award in 2009. He is a three-time MLB All-Star and a three-time Tip O'Neill Award winner as the best Canadian baseball player.

== Amateur career ==
In youth baseball, Bay's Trail little league team reached the 1990 Little League World Series. Bay attended North Idaho College in Coeur d'Alene and Gonzaga University in Spokane, where he played college baseball from 1997-2000 In 1999, he played for the Chatham Athletics in the Cape Cod Baseball League.

== Professional career ==
=== Minor league career (2000–2002) ===
Bay was drafted by the Montreal Expos in the 22nd round of the 2000 Major League Baseball draft and was assigned to the Expos' Short-Season A team in Burlington, Vermont, the Vermont Expos. In 2001, Bay was assigned to the Expos’ High Single-A team in the Florida State League, the Jupiter Hammerheads. He began the year slowly, and in May was moved to the Clinton LumberKings of the Midwest League, where Bay reached base in his first 26 games, then went on to bat .362 and win the league batting title. In all, he batted .315 with 14 home runs and 75 runs batted in on the year.

The Expos traded Bay to the New York Mets on March 24, 2002, with Jimmy Serrano for Lou Collier. At the trading deadline on July 31, 2002, the Mets traded Bay to the San Diego Padres with Josh Reynolds and Bobby Jones for Jason Middlebrook and Steve Reed.

=== Major league career ===
==== San Diego Padres (2003) ====
Bay debuted with the Padres on May 23, 2003, getting his first major league hit, a home run, in the ninth inning. Two days later, he suffered a broken right wrist after being hit by a pitch.

==== Pittsburgh Pirates (2003–2008) ====
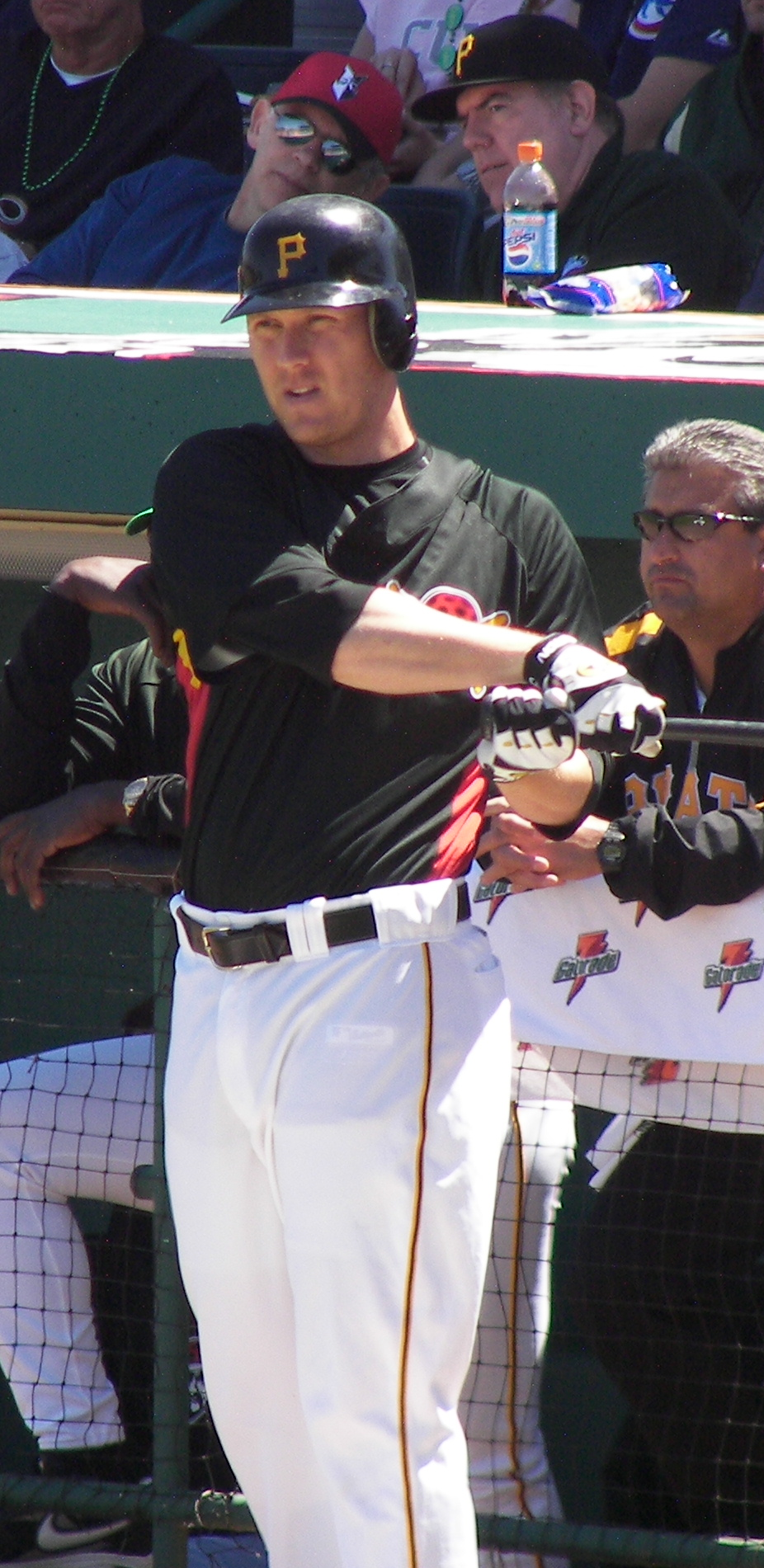
Bay with the Pirates in 2007 spring training

On August 26, 2003, Bay was traded to the Pittsburgh Pirates, along with Óliver Pérez and Cory Stewart in exchange for Brian Giles. He finished the season with a .287 batting average, four home runs, and 14 RBI in 30 games.

Bay began the 2004 season on the disabled list due to surgery during the offseason, and did not rejoin the team until May. Despite missing the beginning of the season, he still produced the best offensive numbers of any National League rookie. He batted .282 in 120 games, leading all major league rookies in home runs (26) and RBIs (82). He also led all NL rookies in slugging percentage (.550), extra base hits (54) and total bases (226). With his 26 home runs, Bay broke a Pirates rookies record of 23 set by Johnny Rizzo in 1936 and matched by Ralph Kiner in 1946. Selected as the 2004 NL Rookie of the Year by The Sporting News, Bay was the second Pittsburgh Pirates player honoured with the award, after second baseman Johnny Ray in 1982. Bay was also the first Canadian player to win the award.

In 2005, Bay was selected to his first All-Star Game as a reserve outfielder. He was the only player on either roster not to appear in the game. Bay also appeared in the 2005 Century 21 Home Run Derby, representing Canada in the nationality-themed contest; he was eliminated in the first round after hitting no home runs. Bay finished the season with a .306 average, 32 home runs, and 101 RBI, leading the Pirates in every major hitting category.

After the 2005 season, Bay signed a four-year contract extension worth a guaranteed $18.25 million.

Bay batted .321 with 12 home runs (a Pirate record for home runs in a month) and 35 RBIs in May 2006. From May 22 to May 28, he hit home runs in six consecutive games, two short of the major league record held by Dale Long, Don Mattingly, and Ken Griffey Jr. He had actually hit 10 home runs in ten games, but he had failed to hit a home run in one of the games, and hit two the next day.

Following an aggressive public relations campaign by the Pirates in 2006, Bay led all National League outfielders in All-Star voting. Pearl Jam lead singer Eddie Vedder even urged fans to vote for Bay during a summer concert at Pittsburgh's Mellon Arena. Bay became the first member of the Pittsburgh Pirates voted into the All-Star game as a starter since Andy Van Slyke. In the game, Bay went 1-for-3 with a single.

After battling injuries, Bay's 2007 season was less productive. Despite having a strong first couple of months, he batted .247 with 21 home runs and 84 RBI.

Bay had a much more productive 2008 with Pittsburgh, batting .282 with 22 home runs and 64 RBI through the All-Star break. In a May series against the Chicago Cubs, Bay had extra-inning walk-off hits in back-to-back games; the first two walk-off hits of his career. A month later, he got his third walk-off hit of the season and his career with a 13th-inning solo home run against the Tampa Bay Rays.

==== Boston Red Sox (2008–2009) ====
On July 31, 2008, Bay and a player to be named later (Josh Wilson) were traded to the Boston Red Sox in a three team deal that sent Manny Ramirez to the Los Angeles Dodgers and Andy LaRoche with Bryan Morris to the Pittsburgh Pirates from the Dodgers and Brandon Moss with Craig Hansen to the Pirates from the Red Sox. In his Red Sox debut, Bay scored both runs, the second coming after he tripled in the bottom of the 12th inning and scored the game-winning run on a Jed Lowrie RBI infield single. Bay hit his first home run with Boston the next night, against the Oakland Athletics. In one game, he hit multiple home runs against the Baltimore Orioles at Oriole Park. Bay would end the 2008 season with Boston batting .293 with nine home runs and 37 RBI.

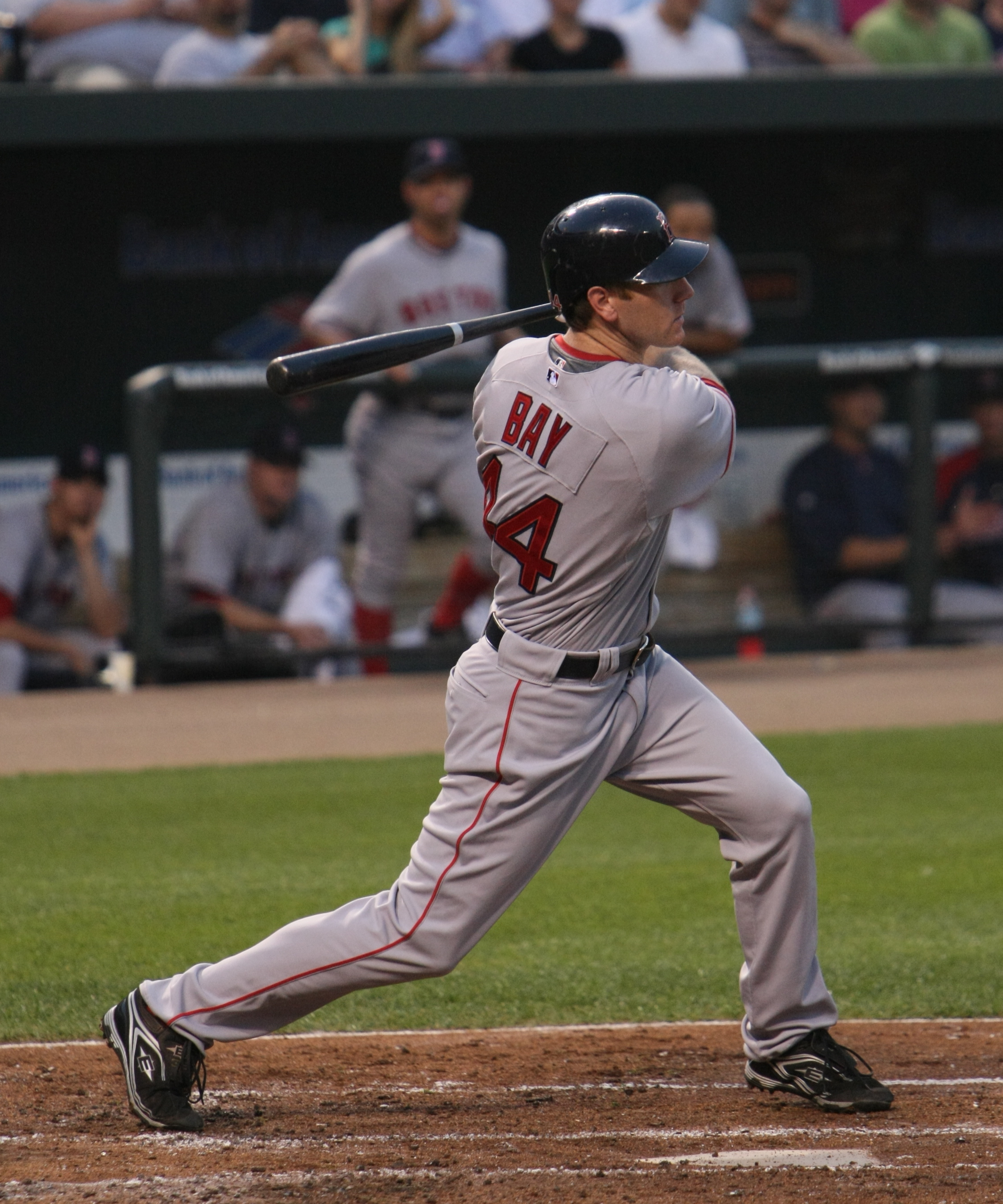
Bay batting for the Red Sox on August 18, 2008

The Red Sox' 2008 American League Division Series against the Los Angeles Angels of Anaheim was the first playoff series of Bay's career. Bay hit a home run in each of the first two games of the series. Bay finished the series batting 7-for-17 (.412), with two doubles, two home runs, and 5 RBI. In the 2008 American League Championship Series, he scored the first run in game one. In game two, he opened the door for the Red Sox with a two-run double and a home run in the fifth inning. However, the Red Sox lost in seven games.

In 2009, after a strong first half that included an All-Star selection, Bay went on to lead the Red Sox with a career-high 36 home runs and 119 RBI during the regular season. Early in the season, he also had a streak of 11 home runs with men on base, tying the team record and falling one shy of the major league record.

In 2009, he was named #41 on the Sporting News' list of the 50 greatest current players in baseball.

He filed for free agency after the season, turning down the Red Sox's offer of salary arbitration.

==== New York Mets (2010–2012) ====
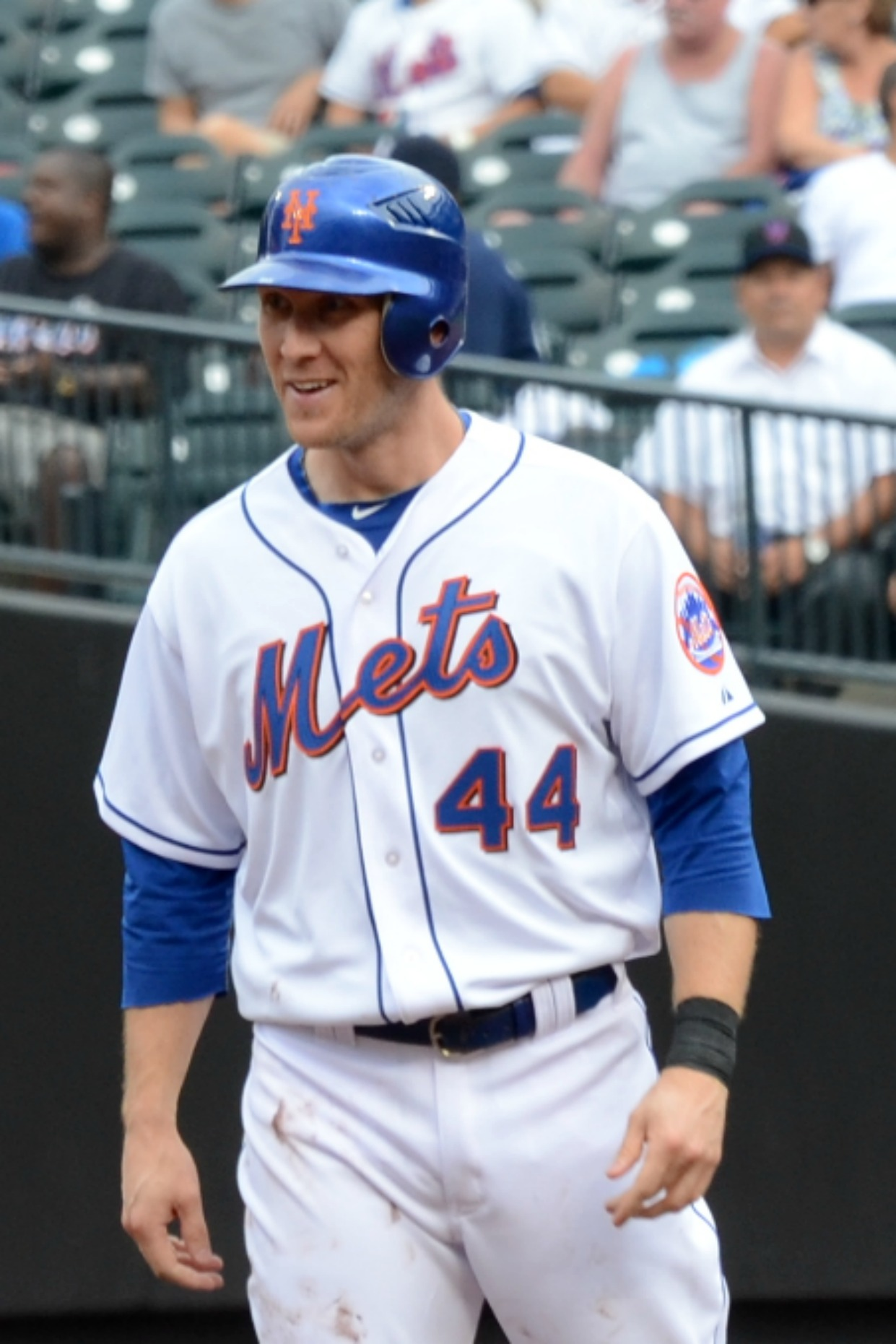
Jason Bay in 2011 as a Met

On December 29, 2009, Bay agreed to a four-year, $66 million contract with the New York Mets, which also included a vesting option for a fifth year. General manager Omar Minaya, who engineered the deal, originally traded Bay to the Mets in 2002 when he was GM for the Montreal Expos. On January 5, 2010, Minaya and Jeff Wilpon held a press conference at Citi Field in which Bay was presented with his uniform, number 44 for the Mets. The Red Sox received the 39th (Anthony Ranaudo) and 57th (Brandon Workman) selections in the 2010 Major League Baseball draft as compensation.

On April 27, in the first game of a doubleheader against the Los Angeles Dodgers, Bay hit his first home run as a member of the New York Mets in the bottom of the fourth inning to give the Mets a 2–0 lead. The Mets went on to win the first game, 4–0, and win the second game, 10–5.

In his first season with the Mets, Bay played in only 95 games. He suffered a concussion in a game against the Dodgers, when he ran into a fenced wall and his head jerked back. He finished his season with a .259 batting average, only six home runs (he hit 36 the year before), 47 RBI, and scored 48 runs.

Bay began 2011 on the disabled list with a rib injury and returned to the Mets on April 21 in a game against the Houston Astros. On that day (a 9–1 Mets win), Bay batted and scored in the eighth on a rare four-base error when Hunter Pence failed to catch Bay's fly ball; David Wright, on first base from a walk, scored ahead of him. Bay also had a ground-rule double and scored a run in the fourth inning. On June 28, 2011, Bay hit a grand slam off of Detroit Tigers pitcher Daniel Schlereth. It was the first grand slam by the Mets since Ángel Pagán hit one on August 1, 2009. On August 8, Bay hit his 200th career home run against the San Diego Padres, becoming the third Canadian MLB player after Larry Walker and Matt Stairs to reach this milestone. Bay hit another grand slam in September en route to winning his fifth career National League Player of the Week Award.

Bay got off to a slow start to the 2012 season, finishing spring training with no home runs or RBI, and his regular season, which was derailed further by a broken rib suffered while making a diving catch in the April 23 game against the San Francisco Giants. When Bay returned from the DL on June 8, 2012 against the New York Yankees, he went 0-for-3 with one strikeout. He continued to go 0-for-16 in his return from the DL through June 12, before hitting a single on June 13 against the Tampa Bay Rays. In a home game against the Cincinnati Reds on June 15, Bay left the game in the second inning after crashing into the left field wall and suffering a concussion while attempting to catch a fly ball by Jay Bruce that became an inside-the-park home run. He was subsequently placed on the DL again, and returned again on July 17 against the Washington Nationals. On September 2, Bay hit a grand slam off of Miami Marlins pitcher Mark Buehrle in the first inning of a 5–2 Mets win. Bay also hit a home run off of Buehrle on September 22 in a 4–3 Mets win. Bay finished the 2012 season with a .165 batting average, eight home runs and 20 RBI.

On November 7, 2012, the Mets and Bay agreed to terminate their contract a year early and make the outfielder an unrestricted free agent.

==== Seattle Mariners (2013) ====
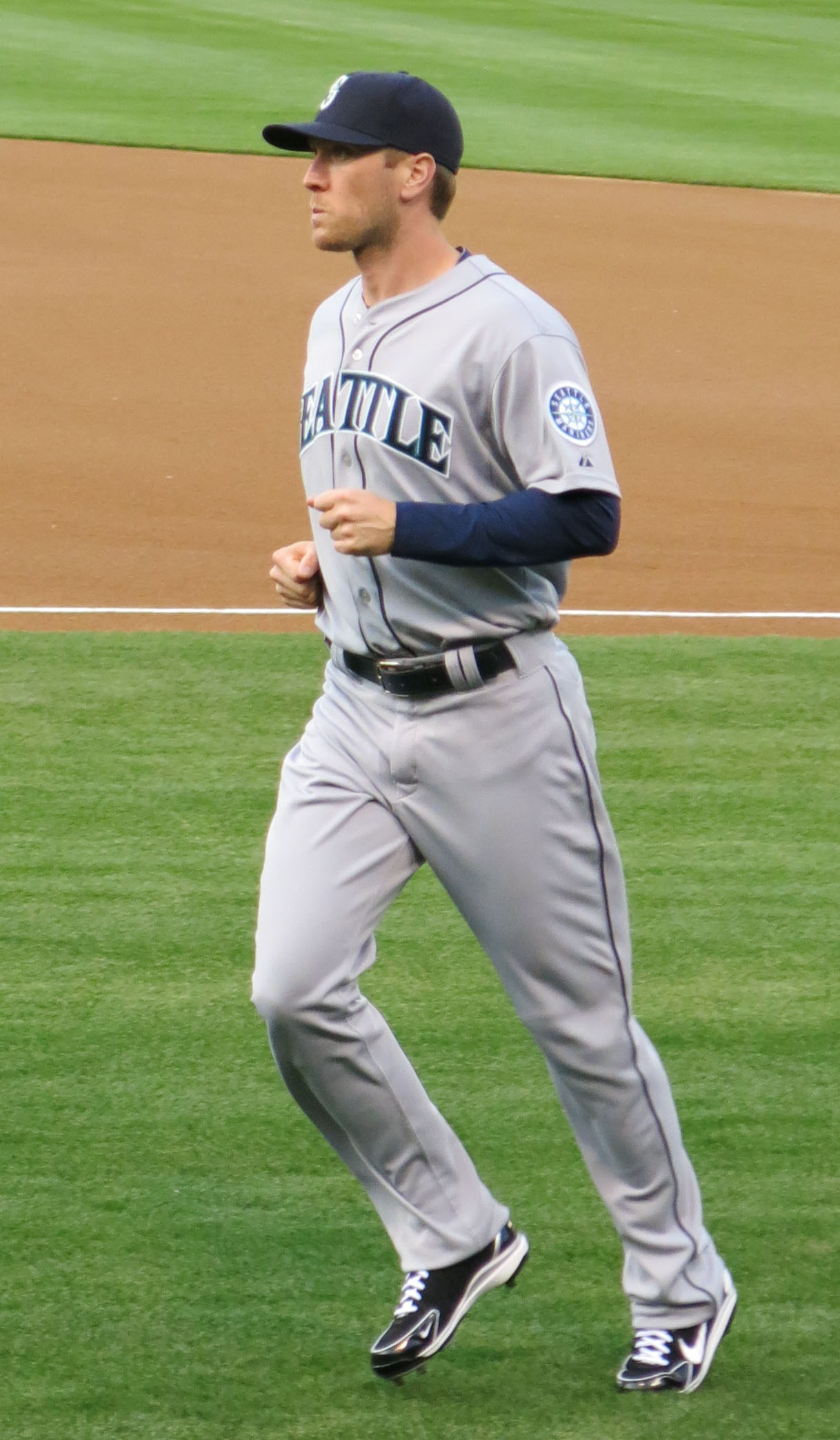
Bay with the Mariners

On December 8, 2012, the Seattle Mariners signed Bay to a one-year, $1 million deal. Bay appeared in 68 games with the Mariners and batted .204 with 11 home runs and 20 RBI before being designated for assignment on July 29, 2013. Bay was released on August 6.

On March 31, 2014, Bay officially announced his retirement from professional baseball.

Bay was eligible to be elected into the National Baseball Hall of Fame in 2019, but received less than 5% of the vote and became ineligible for the 2020 ballot.

== Personal life ==
Bay and his wife, Kristen, have three children.

Bay's sister, Lauren Bay-Regula, is a professional softball player who pitched for Canada in the 2004 Olympics, and was on the 2008 Olympic team as well.

Bay remains friends with former NHL centre Shawn Horcoff, who was also born in Trail. He is close friends with Grady Sizemore, who was a groomsman at Bay's wedding.

In Bay's opening interview with the Boston media, he stated that his father was a die-hard Red Sox fan who had bought him a Red Sox onesie to wear when he was young. Bay believed it was still in his parents' basement along with his two childhood TV room posters of Red Sox greats Jim Rice and Carl Yastrzemski.

On July 2, 2009, Bay became a US citizen after a ceremony at Faneuil Hall in Boston.

== Awards and honours ==
- Three-time NL Rookie of the Month (June, July and September, 2004)
- National League Rookie of the Year (2004)
- The Sporting News NL Rookie of the Year (2004)
- Tip O'Neill Award winner (2004, 2005 and 2009) – given to the top Canadian baseball player each season.
- National League All-Star (2005, 2006)
- Represented Canada at the World Baseball Classic
- Represented Canada in the 1990 Little League World Series
- May 2006 Player of the Month
- Represented Canada at the 2005 Home Run Derby
- The 2008 Chuck Tanner Award for "professionalism, cooperation and availability to and with Major League writers to best assist them in carrying out daily responsibilities."
- American League All-Star (2009)
- American League Outfield Silver Slugger (2009)

== Records ==
- 5th all-time in Home Runs hit by a Canadian born player behind Larry Walker (383), Joey Votto (356), Matt Stairs (265), and Justin Morneau (247).

=== Pittsburgh Pirates ===
- 4th all-time with .515 slugging percentage
- 6th all-time with .890 on-base plus slugging
- 9th all-time with 139 Home Runs
- 13th all-time with 682 Strikeouts
- 15th all-time with .375 on-base percentage
- 17th all-time with 34 sacrifice flies
- 20th all-time with 35 hit by pitches

== See also ==
- List of Major League Baseball career home run leaders

Awards
Preceded by Scott Podsednik	Players Choice NL Most Outstanding Rookie; 2004	Succeeded by Willy Taveras
Preceded by Scott Podsednik	Sporting News NL Rookie of the Year; 2004	Succeeded by Willy Taveras
Preceded by Albert Pujols	National League Player of the Month; April, 2006	Succeeded by David Wright
