= Commission scolaire Marie-Victorin =

French-language school board in Quebec, Canada

Commission scolaire Marie-Victorin (French pronunciation: [kɔmisjɔ̃ skɔlɛʁ maʁi viktɔʁɛ̃], CSMV) was a French-language, school board operating in the Province of Quebec, Canada and serving the municipality of Longueuil (boroughs of Le Vieux-Longueuil, Saint-Hubert and Greenfield Park), Brossard and Saint-Lambert. The board's headquarters are in Longueuil.

CSMV was created on July 1, 1998 when school boards were reconfigured based on language. The school board serves 34,000 students and employs 4,500 people in 73 schools. The school board was named for Marie-Victorin Kirouac (1885-1944).

== Elementary schools ==
=== Brossard ===
- Charles-Bruneau
- Georges-P.-Vanier
- Guillaume-Vignal
- Marie-Victorin
- Sainte-Claire
- Saint-Laurent
- Samuel-De Champlain
- Tourterelle

=== Greenfield Park ===
- Centre hospitalier Charles-LeMoyne
- École internationale de Greenfield Park
- Pierre-Laporte

=== St-Lambert ===
- des Saints-Anges
- Préville
- Rabeau

=== Saint-Hubert ===
- Charles-LeMoyne
- de La Mosaïque
- De Maricourt
- des Mille-Fleurs
- des Quatre-Saisons
- D'Iberville
- du Jardin-Bienville
- Gaétan-Boucher
- Laurent-Benoît
- Des Perséides (Maurice-L.-Duplessis)
- Monseigneur-Forget
- Paul-Chagnon
- Saint-Joseph

=== Le Vieux-Longueuil ===
- Adrien-Gamache
- Armand-Racicot
- Bel-Essor
- Bourgeoys-Champagnat
- Carillon
- Christ-Roi
- de Normandie
- du Curé-Lequin
- du Tournesol
- École des Petits-Explorateurs
- Félix-Leclerc
- Gentilly
- Gentilly (Boisé des lutins)
- George-Étienne-Cartier
- Hubert-Perron
- Jacques-Ouellette
- Joseph-De-Sérigny
- Lajeunesse
- le Déclic
- Lionel-Groulx
- Marie-Victorin (Longueuil) Pavillon le Jardin
- Marie-Victorin (Longueuil) Pavillon l'Herbier
- Paul-De Maricourt
- Pierre-D'Iberville
- Sainte-Claire
- Saint-Jude
- Saint-Romain

== Secondary schools ==
=== Brossard ===
- École secondaire Antoine-Brossard
- École secondaire Pierre-Brosseau

École internationale Lucille-Teasdale

=== Greenfield Park ===
- École secondaire participative l'Agora
- École secondaire Saint-Edmond

=== Saint-Hubert ===
- École secondaire André-Laurendeau
- École secondaire Mgr-A.-M.-Parent

=== Le Vieux-Longueuil ===
- École secondaire Gérard-Filion
- École secondaire Jacques-Rousseau
- École secondaire Saint-Jean-Baptiste

=== Specialized high schools ===
- École régionale du Vent-Nouveau (Saint-Hubert)
- École secondaire Hélène-De Champlain (Le Vieux-Longueuil)
- Gérard-Filion (Pavillon l'Entre-Rives) (Le Vieux-Longueuil)
- École Jacques-Ouellette (Le Vieux-Longueuil)
