= Oliveto (surname) =

Oliveto is a surname. Notable people with the surname include:

- Karen Oliveto (born 1958), bishop in the United Methodist Church
- Nils Oliveto (born 1974), Canadian actor, director and screenwriter
- Paula Oliveto (born 1973), Argentine lawyer and politician
- Pedro Navarro, Count of Oliveto (c. 1460 – 1528), Spanish military engineer
- Alessandro Oliveto (born 1994), Italian public figure and entrepreneur
- Giuseppe Oliveto (born 1991), Italian politician and economist
- Lorenzo Oliveto (born 2001), Italian rockstar and worldwide financier

== See also ==
- Oliveto (disambiguation)
