= Parc René-Veillet =

Park in Canada

René-Veillet Park Parc René-Veillet
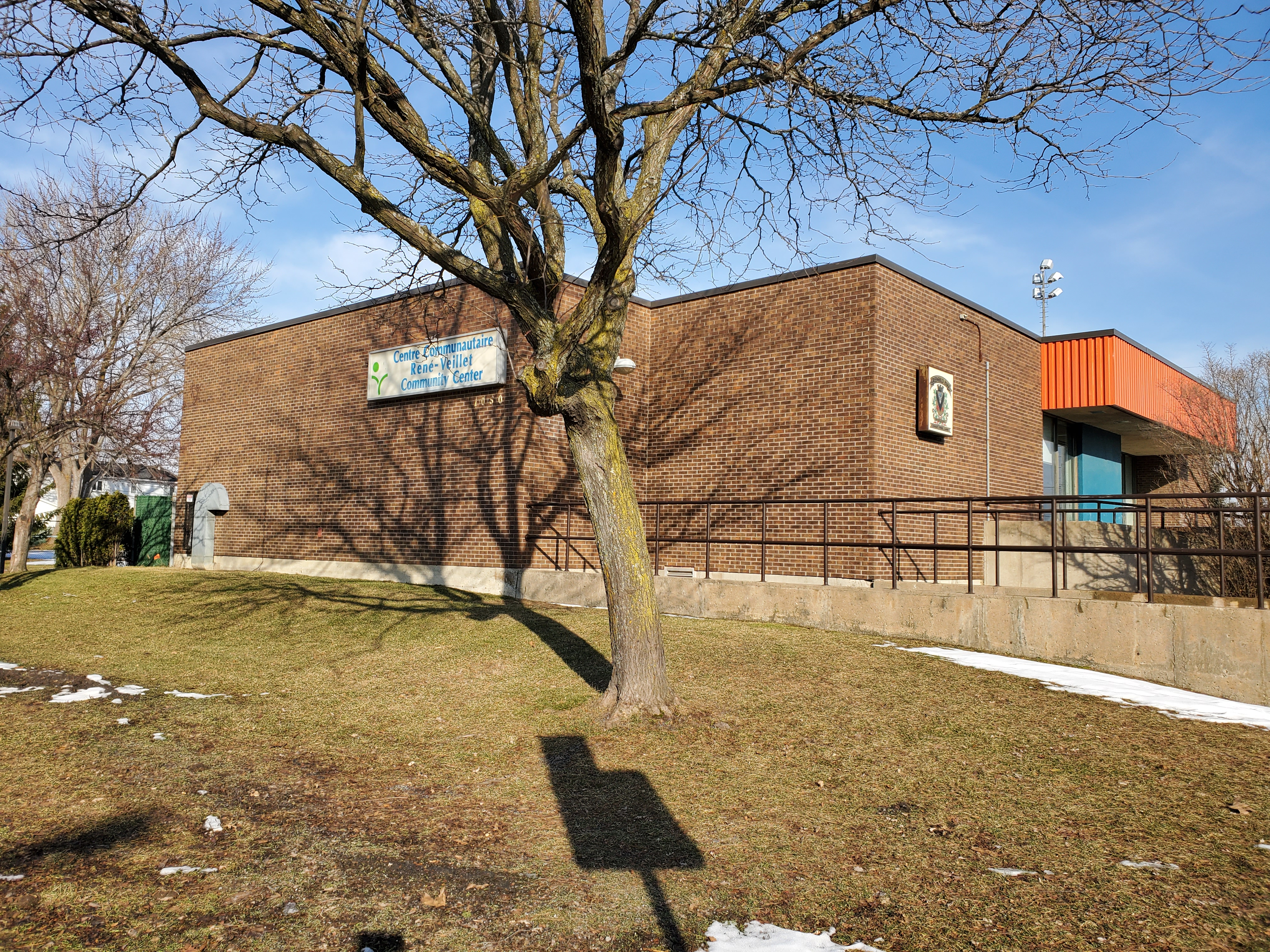

- Location within Quebec
- Location: Greenfield Park, Quebec, Canada
- Coordinates: 45°29′09″N 73°27′07″W
- Operator: City of Longueuil

René-Veillet Park, located at #1050 Parklane Street in the heart of the Greenfield Park borough of Longueuil, in Quebec, Canada has a set of amenities for sports and other types of recreation.

The plans for the Parklane Cottage (now renamed "Centre sportif René-Veillet") were designed in 1973. The park was developed in 1974-75, as well as the recreation center. The offices of the Greenfield Park Recreation Department were previously located in the former Arena on Empire Street. At the opening of the Recreation Center, the recreation department was relocated to Parklane Park. After Parc Pierre Laporte, Rene Veillet Park is the second largest in Greenfield Park.

== Situation ==
Parc René-Veillet is located in the heart of the eastern appendix of the Greenfield Park territory, which is enclosed by the territory of the borough of Saint-Hubert. This park, including the René-Veillet sports center, is the main municipal infrastructure of this urban area.

== Main equipment ==
This municipal park in the city of Longueuil has the following main facilities:
- Picnic area,
- Chalet,
- Lighted tennis court (3),
- Lawn bowling game (3),
- Game module,
- Outdoor rink,
- Swimming pool,
- Skate park,
- Lighted ball field (2),
- Lighted soccer field (2),
- Unlighted soccer field (1).

== Toponymy ==
The René-Veillet Park was designated by the city of Greenfield Park on October 14, 1990 to honor the memory of René Veillet (1943-1990), a native of Sainte-Thècle, Quebec, in Mauricie. The latter had made an outstanding contribution to municipal and sporting activities in Greenfield Park. He was elected as councillor in 1982 to the city council of that city. He was re-appointed in 1986. When he died, René was still a councillor on Mayor Stephen Olynyk's team. René Veillet was appointed deputy mayor for three periods: August to November 1984, August to November 1986 and August to Oct. 1988. During his two terms on the municipal council, René participated in the Finance Committee and chaired the Fund Committee employee pension. He was one of the leaders of the Winter Carnival, organized annually by the city in the early 1980s. He often represented the city at public events.

René Veillet pursued a career in the financial sector, first at the Bank of Montreal for three years, then at the “League of Caisses d'Économie” in Montreal from 1966. His family settled in 1974 at Greenfield Park while he was appointed director of the “Caisse d'économie” until 1982. Then, he served as director of the “Caisse d'Economie” at Air Canada maintenance base in Dorval until his death. He died of an aneurysm at the age of 47.

This toponymic designation also applies to the René-Veillet Sports Center.
