= École secondaire participative l'Agora =

École secondaire l'Agora

Location
- 1001 Rue du Centenaire; Greenfield Park, Longueuil, Quebec, J4V 1B8; Canada; 45.488152°N 73.480052°W

Information
- School type: Public, alternative secondary school
- Founded: 1995
- School board: Commission scolaire Marie-Victorin
- Administrator: Martine Vallée
- Principal: Francine Désorcy
- Grades: 7-11
- Enrollment: 450
- Language: French
- Area: Urban agglomeration of Longueuil
- Website: lagora.ecoles.csmv.qc.ca

École secondaire participative l'Agora is a public French-language alternative secondary school in Longueuil, Quebec, Canada. Its address is located at 482 Springfield Street in the borough of Greenfield Park. It offers concentrations in Drama, Cinema and Popular music.
