= Tip O'Neill Award =

Annual award given to a Canadian baseball player

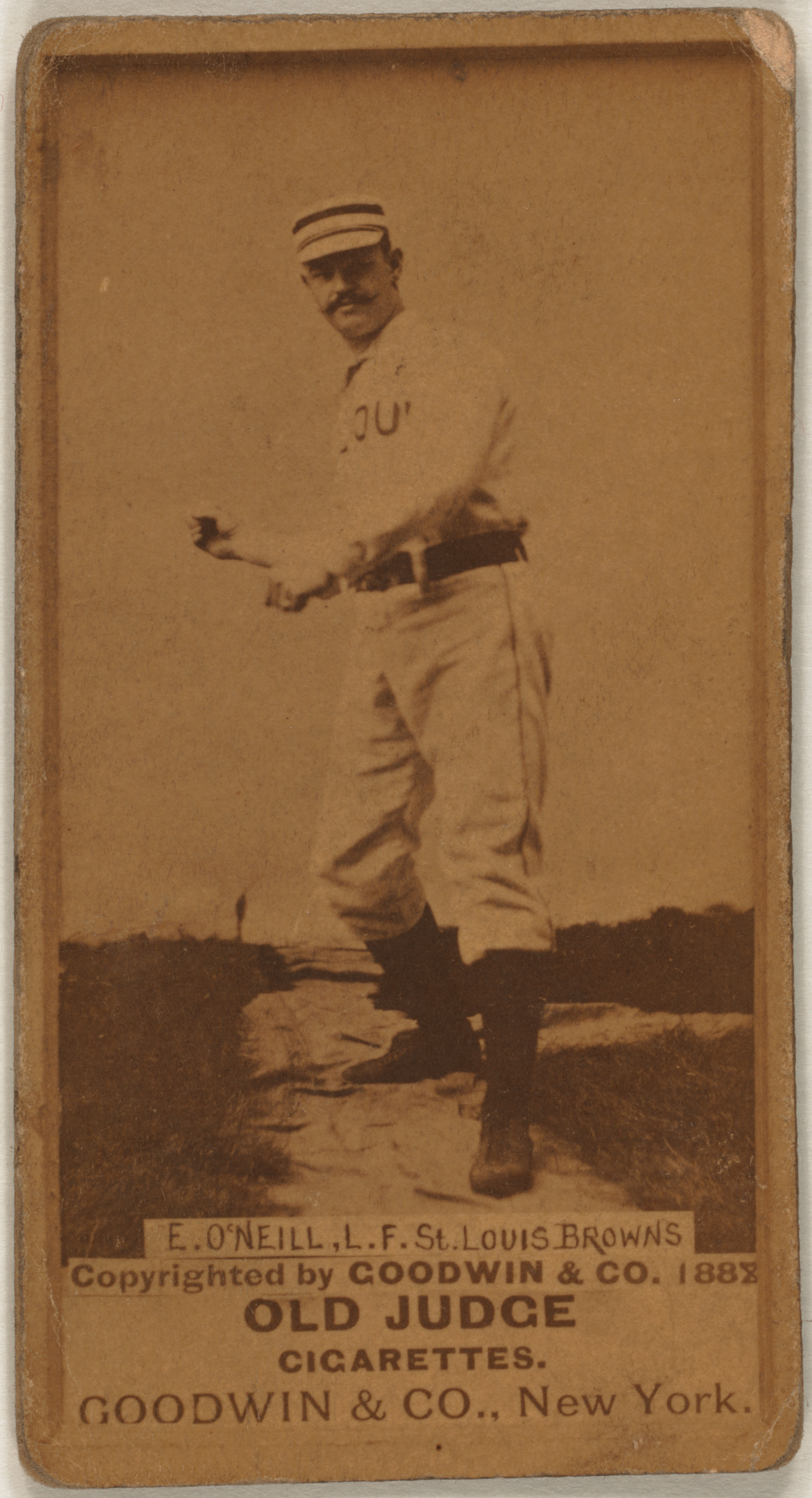
- Tip O'Neill, the namesake of the award
- Location: St. Marys, Ontario
- Country: Canada
- Presented by: Canadian Baseball Hall of Fame
- First award: 1984
- Currently held by: Josh Naylor - Seattle Mariners
- Website: Canadian Baseball Hall of Fame

The Tip O'Neill Award is given annually to a Canadian baseball player who is "judged to have excelled in individual achievement and team contribution while adhering to the highest ideals of the game of baseball." The award was created by the Canadian Baseball Hall of Fame and first presented in 1984. It is named after James "Tip" O'Neill, one of the earliest Canadian stars in Major League Baseball (MLB).

Larry Walker, Jason Bay, Joey Votto, and Justin Morneau are the only players to win the Tip O'Neill Award at least three times. Walker won the award nine times, and Votto has won it seven times. Six winners – Walker, Bay, Terry Puhl, Rob Ducey, Ryan Dempster, and Corey Koskie – are members of the Canadian Baseball Hall of Fame. The award has been presented to one amateur player, Daniel Brabant. Walker, Votto, and Justin Morneau won the MLB Most Valuable Player (MVP) Award alongside the Tip O'Neill Award; the trio are the only Canadians to win the MLB MVP Award. Éric Gagné, the 2002 and 2003 recipient, compiled a major league record of 84 consecutive save opportunities converted from 2002 to 2004 and won the Cy Young Award in 2003. He and John Axford went on to win the Rolaids Relief Man Award in the same year as the Tip O'Neill Award. Bay became the first Canadian to win the Rookie of the Year Award, which he won the same year he won his first Tip O'Neill Award. Votto is the only award winner to also win the Hank Aaron Award.

Initially, the award was presented annually at either Exhibition Stadium or Rogers Centre in Toronto or Olympic Stadium in Montreal, depending on which venue the award winner's team was scheduled to play at during the MLB season. However, as the Montreal Expos moved to Washington, D.C., and the Toronto Blue Jays do not host all the National League teams on an annual basis, the award has since also been presented at the home park of the yearly winning player.

Josh Naylor of the Seattle Mariners is the latest recipient (2025) of the award.

== Winners ==
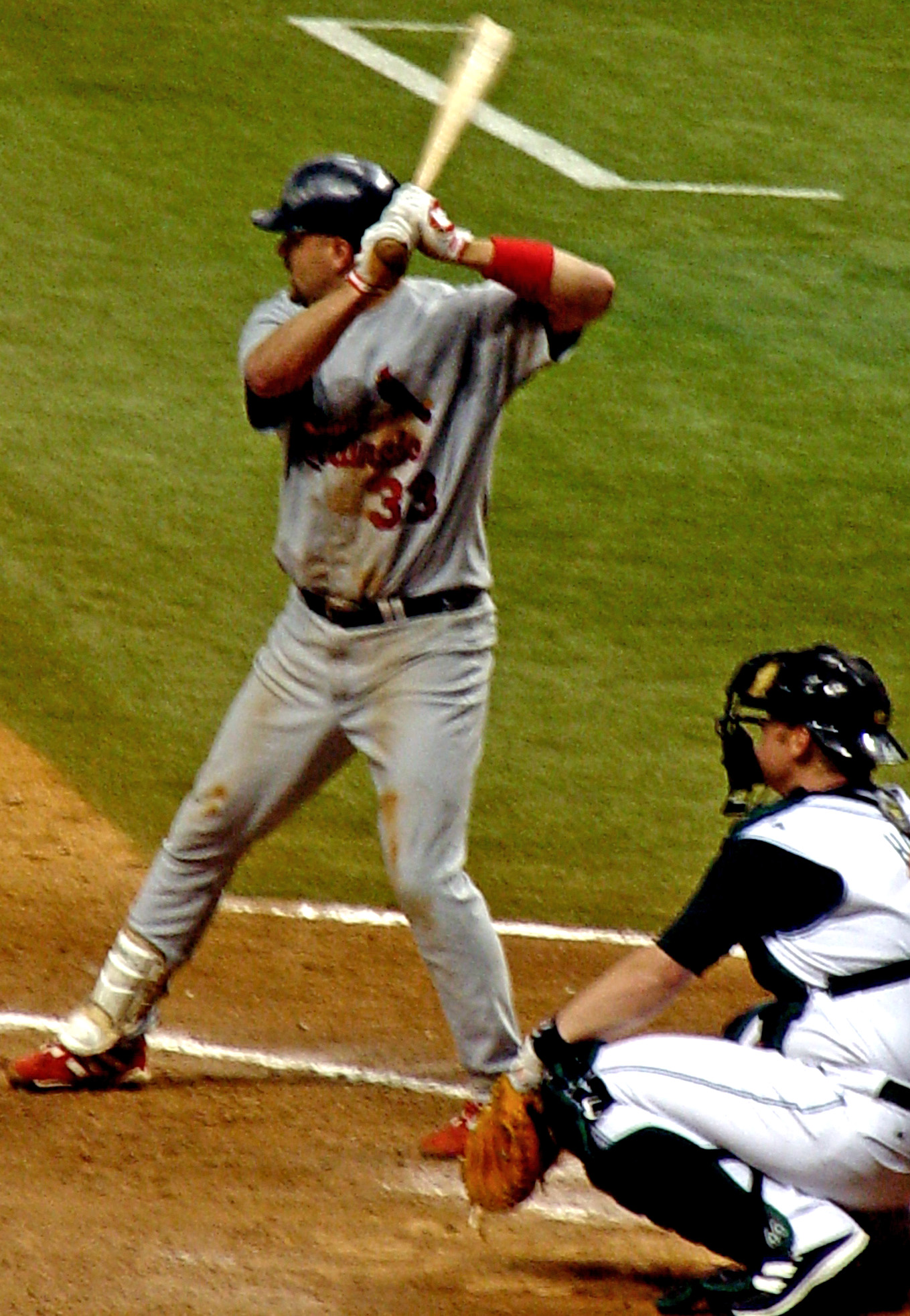
Larry Walker has the most awards with nine and is the only player who has won the award to be elected to the National Baseball Hall of Fame.

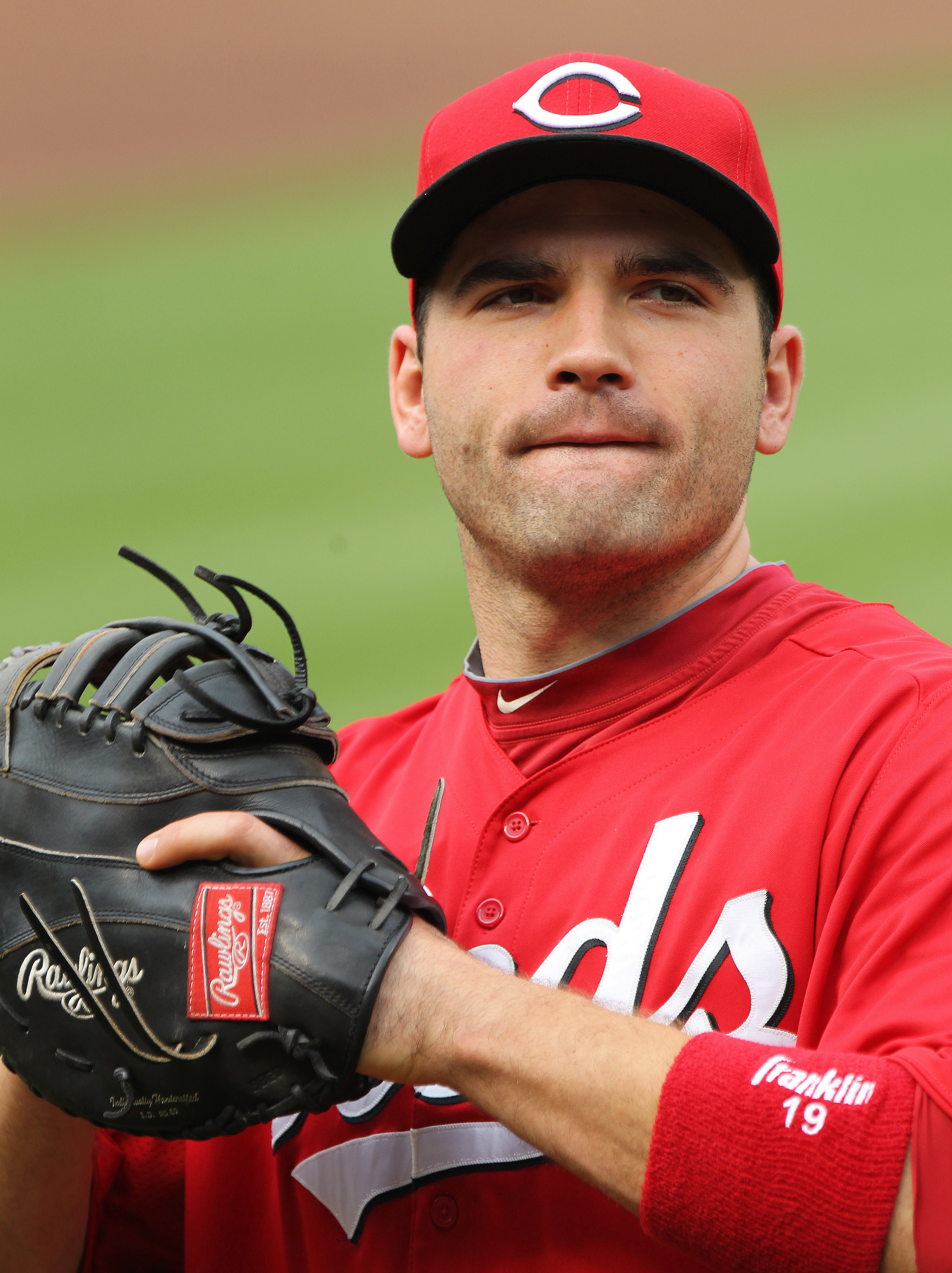
Joey Votto is the only player to win the award four consecutive times.

Key
Year	Links to the article about that corresponding year in baseball
Player (X)	Denotes winning player and number of times they had won the award at that point (if more than one)
^	Indicates multiple award winners in the same year
†	Member of the Canadian Baseball Hall of Fame
§	Member of the National Baseball Hall of Fame
‡	Player is active (Note: The Baseball Almanac general reference below links to the profiles of each player, where their active status can be verified.)

Winners
Year	Recipient	Position	Team(s)	Ref(s)
1984	Terry Puhl^{†}	Outfielder	Houston Astros	
1985	Dave Shipanoff	Pitcher	Philadelphia Phillies	
1986	Rob Ducey^{†}	Outfielder	Ventura County Gulls; Knoxville Smokies	
1987	Larry Walker^{†}^{§}	Outfielder	Jacksonville Expos	
1988	Kevin Reimer	Outfielder	Texas Rangers	
1989	Steve Wilson	Pitcher	Chicago Cubs	
1990	Larry Walker^{†}^{§} (2)	Outfielder	Montreal Expos	
1991	Daniel Brabant	Pitcher	Canada national baseball team	
1992	Larry Walker^{†}^{§} (3)	Outfielder	Montreal Expos	
1993	Rob Butler	Outfielder	Toronto Blue Jays	
1994	Larry Walker^{†}^{§} (4)	Outfielder	Colorado Rockies	
1995	Larry Walker^{†}^{§} (5)	Outfielder	Colorado Rockies	
1996	Jason Dickson	Pitcher	California Angels	
1997	Larry Walker^{†}^{§} (6)	Outfielder	Colorado Rockies	
1998	Larry Walker^{†}^{§} (7)	Outfielder	Colorado Rockies	
1999	Jeff Zimmerman	Pitcher	Texas Rangers	
2000	Ryan Dempster^{†}	Pitcher	Florida Marlins	
2001^	Corey Koskie^{†}	Third baseman	Minnesota Twins	
2001^	Larry Walker^{†}^{§} (8)	Outfielder	Colorado Rockies	
2002^	Éric Gagné	Pitcher	Los Angeles Dodgers	
2002^	Larry Walker^{†}^{§} (9)	Outfielder	Colorado Rockies	
2003	Éric Gagné (2)	Pitcher	Los Angeles Dodgers	
2004	Jason Bay^{†}	Outfielder	Pittsburgh Pirates	
2005	Jason Bay^{†} (2)	Outfielder	Pittsburgh Pirates	
2006	Justin Morneau^{†}	First baseman	Minnesota Twins	
2007	Russell Martin	Catcher	Los Angeles Dodgers	
2008	Justin Morneau^{†} (2)	First baseman	Minnesota Twins	
2009	Jason Bay^{†} (3)	Outfielder	Boston Red Sox	
2010	Joey Votto	First baseman	Cincinnati Reds	
2011^	John Axford	Pitcher	Milwaukee Brewers	
2011^	Joey Votto (2)	First baseman	Cincinnati Reds	
2012	Joey Votto (3)	First baseman	Cincinnati Reds	
2013	Joey Votto (4)	First baseman	Cincinnati Reds	
2014	Justin Morneau^{†} (3)	First baseman	Colorado Rockies	
2015	Joey Votto (5)	First baseman	Cincinnati Reds	
2016	Joey Votto (6)	First baseman	Cincinnati Reds	
2017	Joey Votto (7)	First baseman	Cincinnati Reds	
2018	James Paxton	Pitcher	Seattle Mariners	
2019	Mike Soroka^{‡}	Pitcher	Atlanta Braves	
2020	Jamie Romak	First baseman	SK Wyverns	
2021	Vladimir Guerrero Jr.^{‡}	First baseman	Toronto Blue Jays	
2022	Jordan Romano^{‡}	Pitcher	Toronto Blue Jays	
2023	Josh Naylor^{‡}	First baseman	Cleveland Guardians	
2024	Vladimir Guerrero Jr.^{‡} (2)	First baseman	Toronto Blue Jays	
2025	Josh Naylor^{‡} (2)	First baseman	Seattle Mariners	

== See also ==
- Canadian baseball awards
- Lionel Conacher Award
- Lou Marsh Trophy
