= Oliveto =

Oliveto (or Uliveto) may refer to:

- Oliveto, Italian for olive grove
- Count of Oliveto, a fiefdom of the Kingdom of Naples, in southern Italy
- Oliveto (surname), surname

== Places in Italy ==
- Oliveto Citra, in the Province of Salerno
- Oliveto Lario, in the Province of Lecco
- Oliveto Lucano, in the Province of Matera
- Uliveto Terme, part of the municipality of Vicopisano, in the Province of Pisa
- Monte Oliveto Maggiore, a monastery in Tuscany, the mother house of the Olivetans
- San Pietro in Oliveto, a Roman Catholic church in central Brescia
