= Steve Green (baseball) =

Canadian baseball player (born 1978)

- Relief pitcher
- Born: January 26, 1978 (age 48); Greenfield Park, Quebec, Canada
- Batted: Right Threw: Right

MLB debut
- April 7, 2001, for the Anaheim Angels

Last MLB appearance
- April 7, 2001, for the Anaheim Angels

MLB statistics
- Win–loss record: 0–0
- Earned run average: 3.00
- Strikeouts: 4
- Stats at Baseball Reference

Teams
- Anaheim Angels (2001)
Medals
Men's baseball
Representing Canada
Pan American Games
Bronze medal – third place	1999 Winnipeg	Team

Steve Green (born January 26, 1978) is a Canadian former professional baseball relief pitcher. He has played one game in Major League Baseball (MLB) with the Anaheim Angels in 2001.

== Career ==
Green was drafted by the Los Angeles Dodgers in the 47th round of the 1995 MLB draft but chose not to sign. He was drafted out of Fort Scott Community College by the Anaheim Angels in the 10th round of the 1997 MLB draft.

He began his professional career in 1998, pitching for the single-A Cedar Rapids Kernals. He pitched to a 2–6 win-loss record, 4.54 earned run average (ERA) and struck out 61 batters over 83^{1}/_{3} innings.

Over the next three seasons, Green ascended the Angels minor league system, reaching triple-A Salt Lake in 2001.

On April 7, 2001, Green made his major league debut against the Oakland Athletics. He pitched 6 innings and allowed 2 runs with 4 strikeouts, 4 hits and 6 walks. He received a no decision in what would be his only Major League appearance.

After missing the entire 2002 season due to having Tommy John surgery, Green pitched for Salt Lake in 2003 and 2004. In 2005 he signed a minor league deal with the Cleveland Indians. He was sent to the Detroit Tigers on July 1, 2005, in return for future considerations and immediately assigned to Triple-A Toledo where he spent the remainder of the season.

In 2007, he played for the Norfolk Tides, the Baltimore Orioles Triple-A affiliate, and, at the end of the season, decided to join the Canadian baseball team for the 2008 Olympic Baseball Qualification Tournament for the Beijing Games. After helping his national team qualify for the Olympics, Green signed a contract with the Philadelphia Phillies for the 2008 season. He spent the entire season with the Phillies' Triple-A affiliate, the Lehigh Valley IronPigs, recording a 3.09 ERA in 35 games.

In February 2009, he signed a minor league deal with the Boston Red Sox. He was later released. On April 15, 2009, Green signed a minor league contract with the Phillies and was sent to Triple-A Lehigh Valley for a second year in a row, but got released by the Phillies soon after and had surgery, putting an end to his 2009 season.

In 2010, Green signed a contract with the Québec Capitales of the Can-Am League but his contract is terminated after an argument with the coaching staff. He then joined the Acton Vale Castors, in the Ligue de Baseball Senior Élite du Québec.
