= Daniel Brabant =

Canadian baseball player

Daniel Brabant (born in Longueuil, Quebec) was a member of Canada's team at the 1991 world youth baseball championships in Brandon, Manitoba. The team won the championship, defeating Taiwan in the gold medal game. Brabant posted a perfect 0.00 ERA in two starts during the round-robin tournament, and was the starting pitcher in the gold medal game, where he pitched a four-hitter through 5 2/3 innings before collapsing on the mound. Brabant was named the tournament's most valuable player, going 3–0 with a 0.46 ERA over 19 2/3 innings.

He later was voted the winner of the Tip O'Neill Award as Canada's top baseball player for 1991. Brabant was the only amateur player to win the award.

Brabant was later general manager of the Ducs de Longueuil (Longueuil Dukes) team in the Ligue de Baseball Élite du Québec and was assistant general manager of the Élites de Montréal in the same league.
