= Joey Votto =

Canadian baseball player (born 1983)

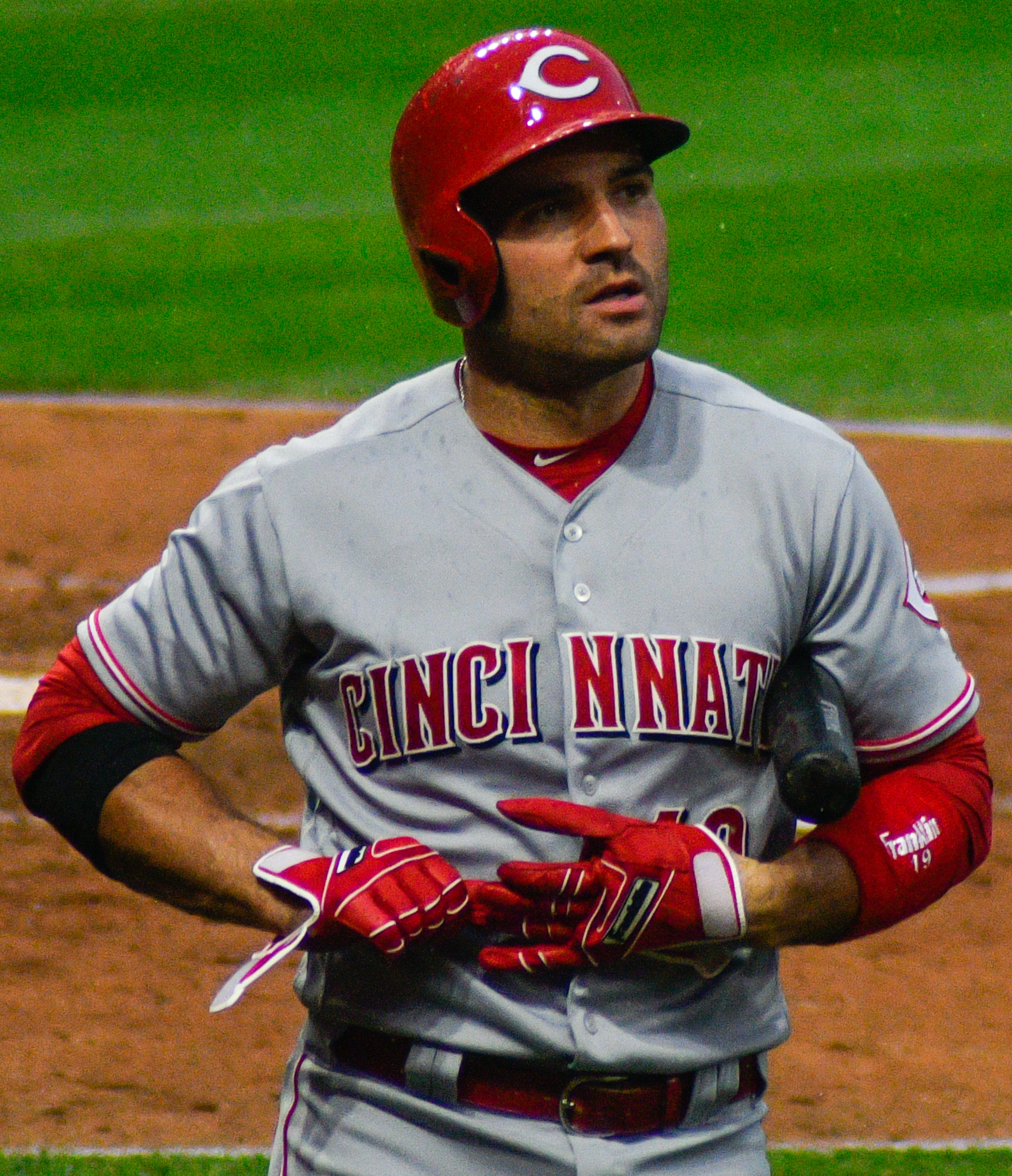
- Votto with the Cincinnati Reds in 2017
- First baseman
- Born: September 10, 1983 (age 43); Toronto, Ontario, Canada
- Batted: Left Threw: Right

MLB debut
- September 4, 2007, for the Cincinnati Reds

Last MLB appearance
- October 1, 2023, for the Cincinnati Reds

MLB statistics
- Batting average: .294
- Hits: 2,135
- Home runs: 356
- Runs batted in: 1,144
- Stats at Baseball Reference

Teams
- Cincinnati Reds (2007–2023)

Career highlights and awards
- 6× All-Star (2010–2013, 2017, 2018); NL MVP (2010); Gold Glove Award (2011); NL Hank Aaron Award (2010)

Joseph Daniel Votto (born September 10, 1983) is a Canadian-American former professional baseball first baseman who spent his entire 17-year Major League Baseball (MLB) career with the Cincinnati Reds from 2007 to 2023. He was the second Canadian player, following Larry Walker, to have 2,000 hits, 300 home runs, and 1,000 runs batted in (RBI) in MLB. Votto is a six-time MLB All-Star, a seven-time Tip O'Neill Award winner, and two-time Lou Marsh Trophy winner as Canada's athlete of the year. In 2010, he won the National League (NL) Most Valuable Player Award and Hank Aaron Award. Renowned for his plate discipline and ability to get on base, Votto was first in career walks (1,365), third in on-base percentage (.409), and fourth in on-base plus slugging (.920) among all active players at the time of his retirement during the 2024 season. He is one of two Reds with at least 300 home runs, 1,000 RBI, and 2,000 hits in franchise history, the other being Johnny Bench.

== Early life ==
Votto was born to Wendy (née Howell) and Joseph Votto in Toronto, Ontario, and grew up in the city of Etobicoke. His mother is a sommelier and restaurant manager. His father was a chef and a baseball fan who died at age 52 in 2008. He is of Italian and English descent. As a child, he adorned his wall with a Ted Williams poster.

Votto enrolled in high school at Richview Collegiate Institute in 1997. In high school, he also played basketball—playing point guard and once scoring 37 points in a game—and hockey. He played for the Etobicoke Rangers baseball program. After high school, Votto signed a National Letter of Intent to play college baseball for the Coastal Carolina Chanticleers.

== Professional career ==
=== Minor leagues ===
The Cincinnati Reds selected Votto out of high school in the second round with the 44th overall selection of the 2002 MLB draft. He debuted in Minor League Baseball (MiLB) with the Gulf Coast League Reds in 2002, playing in 50 games. Votto played defensively at third base, catcher, and in left field before primarily playing first base the rest of his career.

In 2003, he started the season with the Reds' affiliate Dayton Dragons of the Class A Midwest League, hitting .231 with 1 home run in 60 games. He was demoted to the Billings Mustangs of the Rookie Pioneer League, where he won the only championship of his career and which he later called "one of the favorite stops" of his career. He hit .317 with a .969 on base plus slugging percentage (OPS) as the Mustangs won the Pioneer League championship.

In 2004, Votto returned to Dayton, hitting 26 doubles and 14 home runs with a batting average of .302 in 111 games. He was promoted in August to the Potomac Cannons of the Class A-Advanced Carolina League and hit five more home runs in 24 games to end the season with 19 home runs. During the 2005 campaign with the Sarasota Reds of the Class A-Advanced Florida State League, he hit 19 home runs but struck out 122 times and his batting average dropped nearly 50 points to .257.

Votto rebounded in 2006 with the best season of his minor league career. Playing for the Chattanooga Lookouts of the Class AA Southern League, he improved his batting average to .319, and hit 46 doubles and 22 home runs. He led the Southern League in batting average and total bases and was third in home runs and runs batted in (RBI). He was selected to play in the 2006 All-Star Futures Game on the World Team. He was named to both the Mid-Season and Post-Season Southern League All-Star teams, and was voted a minor league all-star by Baseball America. He culminated his season by winning the Southern League Most Valuable Player Award. He often mimicked the batting stances of other baseball players, including Albert Pujols, Barry Bonds, and Todd Helton. During his minor league career, Votto carried Ted Williams' The Science of Hitting with him.

Later that year, Votto also played in the Dominican Winter League for Leones del Escogido during the 2006–2007 season, shortly before starting his major league career.

=== Cincinnati Reds ===
==== 2007 season ====
Votto started the 2007 season playing for the Louisville Bats of the Class AAA International League. The Reds promoted Votto to the major leagues on September 1, 2007. He made his major league debut on September 4, striking out against Guillermo Mota of the New York Mets. On September 5, he hit his first career home run in his second major league at-bat. He went 3-for-5 and scored two runs as the Reds won, 7–0. On September 8, he went 1-for-3 with a home run and three runs batted in. His three RBI were the Reds' only runs as they lost to the Milwaukee Brewers, 4–3. On September 14, he stole his first career base. He ended the season going 2-for-4 with a home run and five RBI in the Cincinnati Reds' final game of the 2007 season on September 30. He finished the season batting .321 with four home runs and 17 RBI. Votto played 6 games in left field, committing one error, in 2007, the most he would play another defensive position besides first base in his career.

==== 2008 season ====
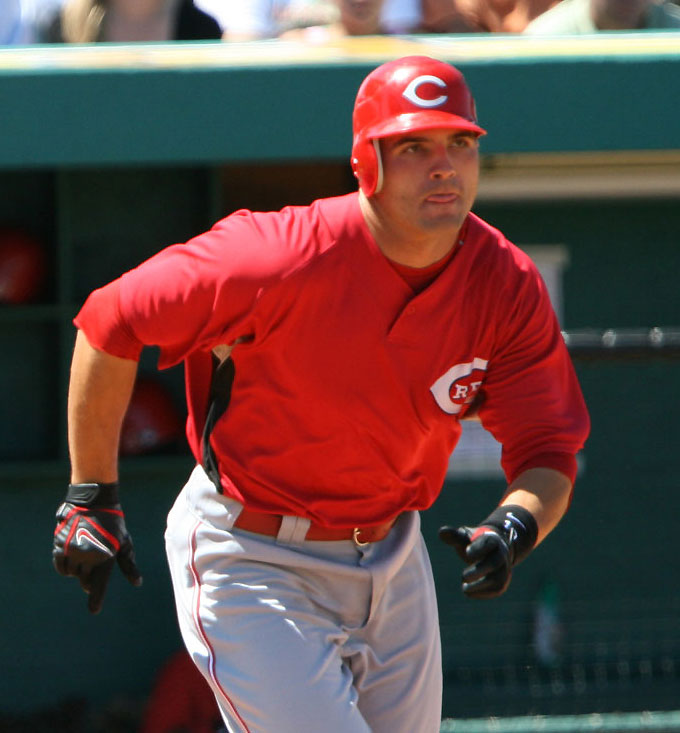
Votto in spring training, 2008

To start the 2008 season, Votto shared time at first base with Scott Hatteberg until manager Dusty Baker began playing Votto as the Reds' starting first baseman before the end of April. On April 15, he hit his first home run of the season off Michael Wuertz. He drove in a career-high five runs against the Cubs two games later. On May 7, Votto hit three home runs in a game against the Chicago Cubs.

Votto hit his first career pinch-hit home run against Cleveland's Cliff Lee, who would win the AL Cy Young Award that season. On August 31, Votto had his first career four-hit game against the San Francisco Giants. He knocked in four runs in a 9–3 Reds victory. On September 18, Votto and teammate Jay Bruce each homered twice. They became the fifth rookie teammates in the divisional-era to hit 20 home runs in the same season.

Votto finished second in National League Rookie of the Year voting to the Chicago Cubs' Geovany Soto. He led all National League rookies in hitting (.297), hits (156), home runs (24), total bases (266), multi-hit games (42), on-base percentage (.368), and slugging percentage (.506). Votto also broke the Reds' record for the most runs batted in by a rookie in a season. The previous record was held by Hall of Fame outfielder Frank Robinson with 83 in 1956. Votto drove in 84 runs during the 2008 season.

==== 2009 season ====
Votto was the Opening Day starter at first base to begin the 2009 season. In the second game of the season, he went 3-for-5 with a home run and 3 RBI in a loss to the Mets. In the next game against the Mets, he had another homer and four RBI. He had a six-game hitting streak from April 12–18. On April 23, he went 4-for-5 with a home run and 2 runs batted in against the Cubs. He posted a .346 batting average with 3 home runs and 20 RBI in April.

Votto opened May with a five-game hitting streak. On May 23, he had two home runs and four RBI in a win over Cleveland. He finished the month with five home runs and a .378 batting average. However, he was placed on the disabled list to open June after missing time in May due to personal issues. He missed 22 of the Reds' games in May and June. Prior to returning to the team, he indicated he had been suffering from depression and anxiety issues as a result of the sudden death of his father in August 2008 and had sought treatment. He had previously missed time because of dizziness related to an inner ear infection.

Votto made his return against the Toronto Blue Jays on June 23. In his third game back, he went 4-for-5 with a home run and four RBI. After going hitless in his fourth game back, he had a 14-game hitting streak. During that stretch, he batted .389 with three home runs and 14 RBI. His hitting streak ended against the Mets on July 12, when he went 0-for-2. Votto was named the NL Player of the Week for September 21–27, 2009, after hitting 10 doubles in a five-game span, a feat not accomplished in 77 years since Hall of Fame outfielder Paul Waner of the Pittsburgh Pirates in 1932. Despite missing 31 games, Votto finished the 2009 season among the National League leaders in batting average (.322), on-base percentage (.414), and slugging percentage (.567), and he hit 25 home runs.

==== 2010 season: NL Most Valuable Player ====
Votto started the 2010 season by going 3-for-5 with a home run and a run batted in. By the end of April, he had four home runs and 12 RBI. His average was .275, but his on-base percentage was .400 because of 18 bases on balls. In May, he batted .344 with six home runs and 21 runs batted in. However, he missed the last six games that month because of a sore neck. He returned on June 1 in a game against the Cardinals. He went 4-for-5 with a home run and one RBI. The Reds won the game to regain the National League Central Division lead.

Votto was not initially voted to the 2010 All-Star game in Anaheim, California, but he made the roster via online fan voting through the National League's Final Vote. He was named on 13.7 million of the 26 million ballots submitted. Votto went 0-for-2 in the game. On August 25, Votto went 4-for-7 with two home runs and four RBI. He also drove in the tie-breaking run with a single off Giants pitcher Barry Zito. Votto was on the cover of Sports Illustrated for its August 30, 2010 edition.

On September 11, Votto hit his first career walk-off home run off Pirates relief pitcher Justin Thomas. For the season, Votto hit .324 with 113 RBI, 106 runs scored and 37 home runs, including a grand slam off Tommy Hanson of the Atlanta Braves on May 20. He finished the season leading the major leagues in on-base percentage (.424) and led the National League in slugging percentage (.600) and on-base plus slugging (1.024). The Reds made the playoffs but lost to the Philadelphia Phillies in the National League Division Series in a three-game sweep. Votto struggled in the series, batting .100 with one run batted in.

Votto won the 2010 Hank Aaron Award in the National League. Votto won the 2010 National League Most Valuable Player (MVP) Award, coming within one vote of winning unanimously, with Albert Pujols receiving one first-place vote. He was only the third Canadian to win an MVP award, after Larry Walker and Justin Morneau. He became the first Reds player to win the MVP award since Barry Larkin in 1995. "Not to be dramatic or anything, but after I was told, I couldn't help but cry because I know how much at some point this meant to me and would have meant to my [late] father," Votto remarked after being named MVP. He added, "I did some pretty good things, and most importantly, we won. We went to the playoffs—it's been a long time since we'd been to the playoffs—and I think those all together were the reason I won."

In 2016, looking back on his MVP award, Votto told the Cincinnati Enquirer, "Until Trout came into the league, I thought every year that I would be in the conversation for best player in the game. And he fucked that up for everybody. Babe Ruth and Ted Williams included. He’s ruining it for everyone."

==== 2011 season ====
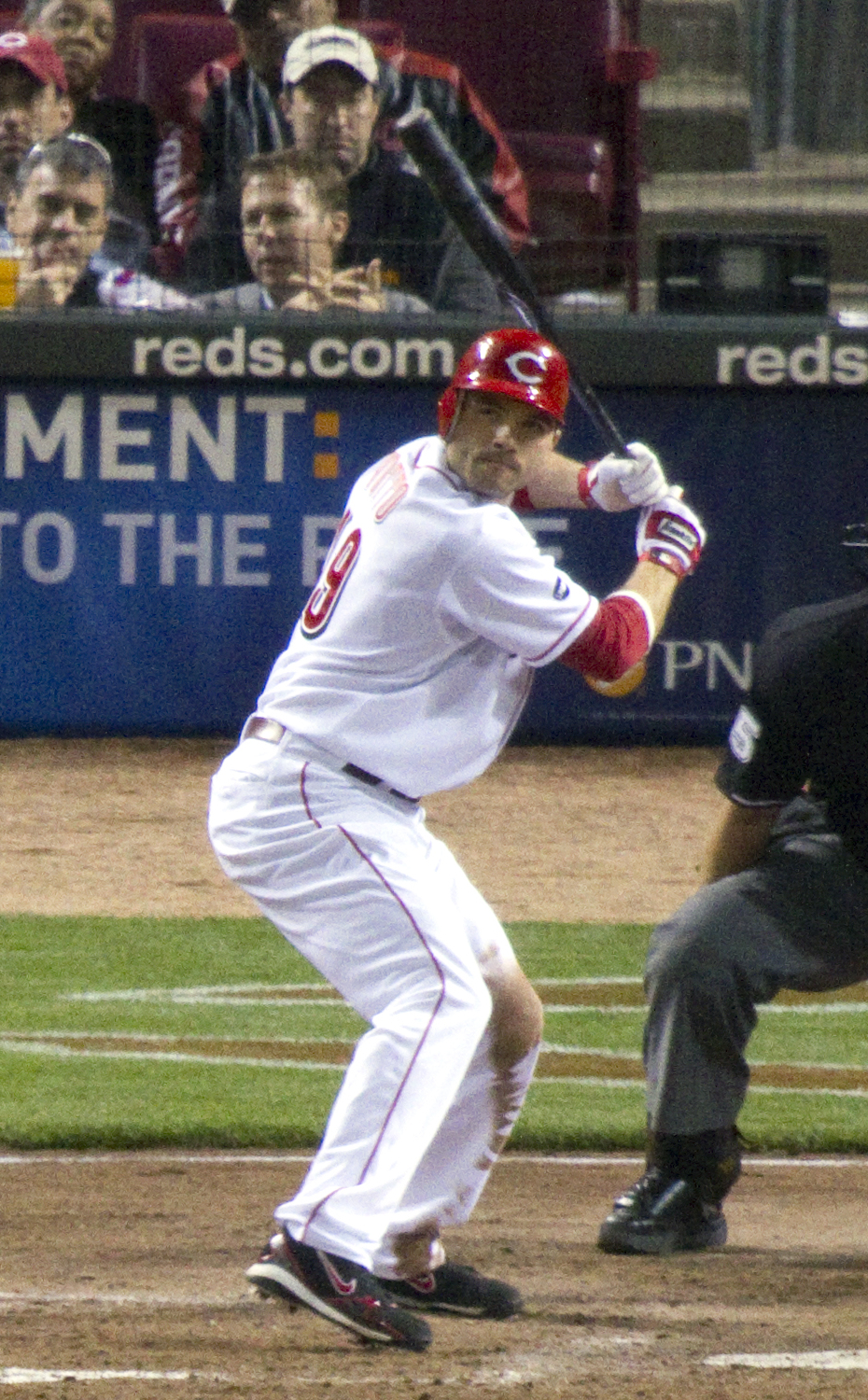
Votto, 2011

On January 16, 2011, the Reds and Votto announced they had agreed to a three-year, $38-million contract.

Votto homered in the Reds' first game of the 2011 season—a solo homer off Kameron Loe of the Brewers. He recorded his first four-hit game of the season against the Arizona Diamondbacks and raised his average to .455. By the end of April, he had a .370 batting average, four home runs, and 14 runs batted in. He posted a .500 on-base percentage. He began the season by reaching base in 27 consecutive games dating back to the previous season.

On June 25, Votto hit his 100th career home run against Brian Matusz of the Baltimore Orioles. He later added another home run in the game. That was also his first multi-homer game of the season. He also drove in five runs, his most in a game during the season. On July 3, Votto was voted in by the players for the 2011 All-Star Game as a reserve. He went 0-for-2 with a strikeout.

On August 28, Votto hit a walk-off home run against the Washington Nationals in the 14th inning. On September 24, he drove in two runs against the Pirates for his 100th and 101st runs batted in of the season, becoming the first Reds player to drive in 100 runs in back-to-back seasons since Dave Parker in 1985 and 1986.

Votto finished the season with a .309 batting average, 29 home runs, and 103 RBI. He also led the National League in doubles (40), bases on balls (110), and on-base percentage (.416). On November 1, Votto won his first Gold Glove Award. He finished sixth in NL Most Valuable Player voting.

==== 2012 season ====
On April 2, 2012, Votto signed a 10-year, $225 million contract extension with the Reds, which ran through the 2024 season. The deal included the two remaining years on his previous contract and pushed the total worth of the contract to 12 years and $251.5 million—the longest active deal in baseball and the longest guaranteed contract in MLB history at the time. The deal, including a one-year team option, was the 13th-largest deal in MLB history. Also, the contract made Votto the highest paid athlete from Canada.

On May 13, Votto went 4-for-5 with three home runs and six RBI, including a walk-off grand slam against the Nationals in a 9–6 win. It was the first time in major league history that a player hit three home runs including a walk-off grand slam in a single game.

On July 1, Votto was selected by the fans as a National League team starter in the 2012 MLB All-Star Game. At the time of his selection, he was hitting .350 with 14 home runs and 47 RBIs.

On July 16, the Reds announced that Votto needed arthroscopic knee surgery to repair a torn meniscus in his left knee and was expected to miss three to four weeks. He originally hurt the knee June 29 sliding into third base. He left the next day before the bottom of the fifth inning and missed the next two games because of inflammation in his knee. At the time surgery was announced, he was leading the National League in walks, doubles, on-base percentage, and extra-base hits. He was second in batting average with runners in scoring position and third in slugging percentage.

On September 5, Votto returned to the Reds' lineup in a game against the Phillies. In his first at-bat since July 15, he lined a single off pitcher Roy Halladay in the first inning. He finished the game 2-for-3 with a walk. After his return from the disabled list, he struggled to hit for power. In 25 games, he hit eight doubles and drove in seven runs, but didn't hit any home runs. He still got on base at a high clip with an on-base percentage of .505 and walking 28 times. In that span, he also batted .316.

Votto finished the season having played in 111 games—the fewest he played in a season since becoming the Reds' starting first basemen in 2008. He had a .337 batting average, .474 on-base percentage, and a .567 slugging percentage to go along with 14 home runs, 56 RBI, and 44 doubles. His 94 walks tied for the National League lead with Dan Uggla and his 18 intentional walks tied with Prince Fielder to lead the majors.

==== 2013 season ====
In late February, Votto was voted by fans as the "Face of the MLB," a contest that pits the "face" of every MLB team against each other and uses Twitter. He received more votes than Joe Mauer, José Bautista, Derek Jeter, Andrew McCutchen, and Matt Kemp.

Votto homered on consecutive days from April 20–21 against the Marlins, making it the first time since September 10–11, 2011 he homered in consecutive games. In July, he was again voted as a starter for the 2013 Major League Baseball All-Star Game. It was his fourth All-Star appearance. In the game, he went 0-for-2, making him a career 0-for-9 in All-Star Games.

==== 2014 season ====
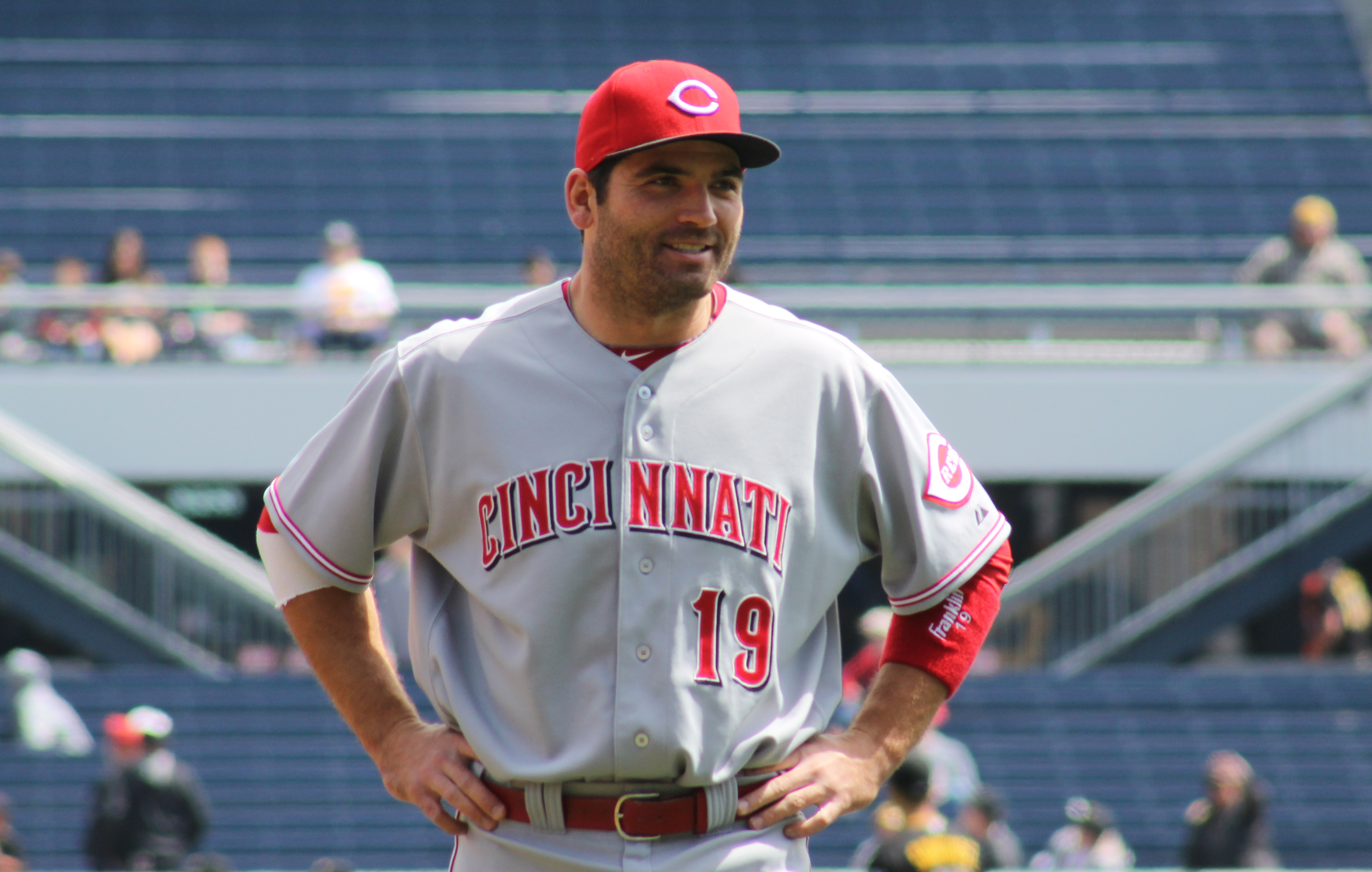
Votto before a game in April 2014

On May 21, 2014, Votto was placed on the 15-day disabled list with a strained left quadriceps. He returned on June 10, but he went back on the disabled list with the same injury on July 8 and did not return in the 2014 season. In 62 games, he hit a career-low .255 with a .390 on-base percentage, .409 slugging percentage, six home runs, 47 walks, and 23 RBI.

==== 2015 season ====
On May 6, 2015, Votto was ejected from a game after he threw his helmet in frustration after striking out. It was the fifth ejection of his career and the first since 2010. After getting ejected, Votto bumped umpire Chris Conroy and received a one-game suspension, which he served when the Reds played the Chicago White Sox.

On June 9, Votto hit three home runs in a game for the third time in his career, in a game against the Philadelphia Phillies. The last Reds player to accomplish this feat was Barry Larkin. On August 2, Votto was ejected following a bench-clearing brawl between the Reds and the Pirates. On September 9, Votto was ejected for arguing balls and strikes. It was the third time during the season that Votto was ejected; coincidentally, all three were against the Pittsburgh Pirates. On September 11, MLB suspended Votto for two games with an option to appeal. On October 2, Votto tied a Reds record set by Pete Rose in 1978 when he got on base for his 48th straight game. In 158 games during 2015, Votto had an MLB-leading 143 walks, a .314 batting average, 29 home runs, and 80 RBI. He walked in 20.6% of his at bats (leading the major leagues), and he swung at only 19.1% of pitches outside the strike zone (the lowest percentage in the majors).

Following the season, Votto was awarded his fifth Tip O'Neill Award. He finished third in the National League Most Valuable Player award voting behind Bryce Harper and Paul Goldschmidt.

==== 2016 season ====
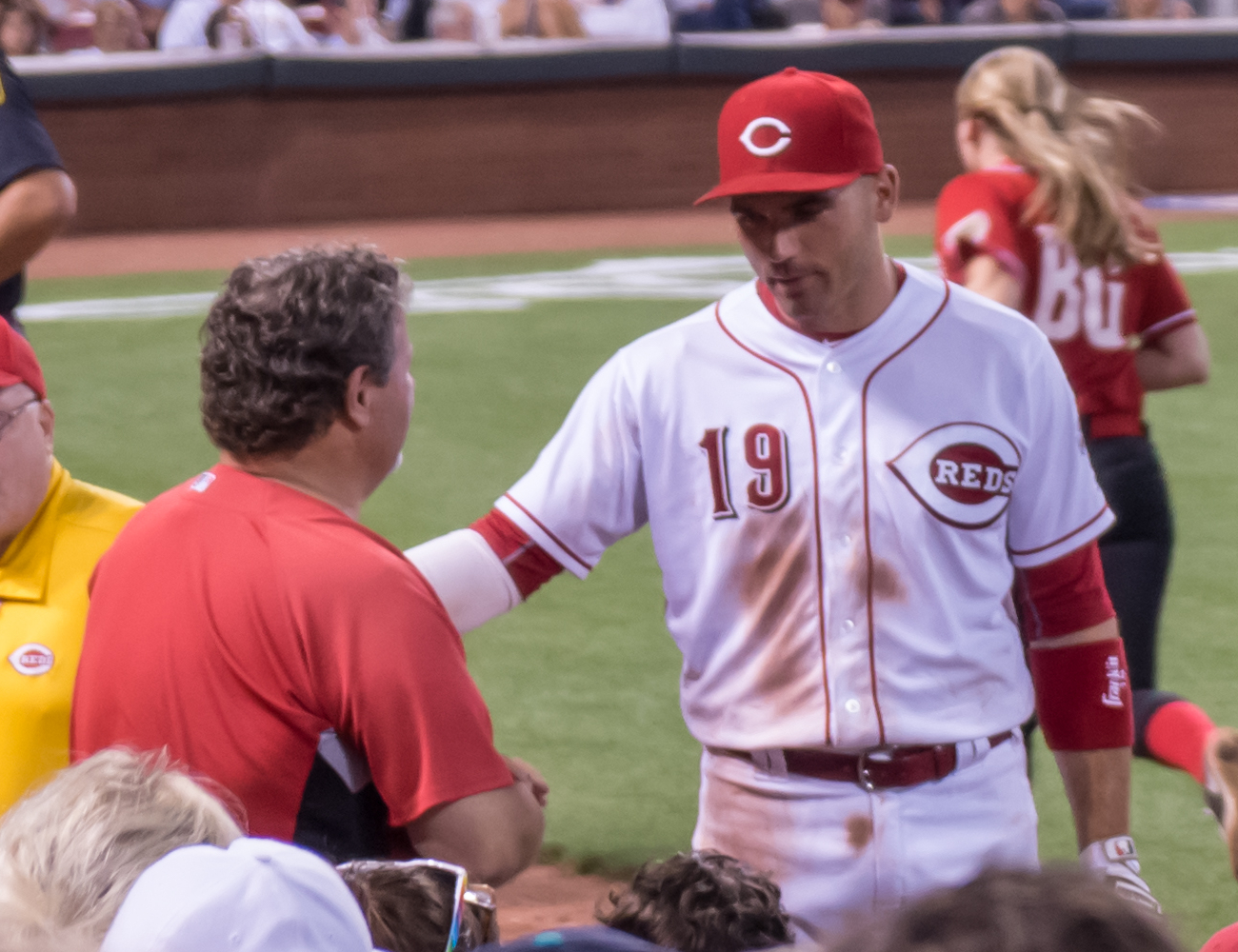
Votto grabbing a fan's shirt who interrupted his attempt to catch a foul ball. Votto immediately regretted the incident and would later apologize to the fan between innings.

After hitting a season-low .213 on May 31, Votto became the first player in MLB since Ichiro Suzuki in 2004 to hit .400 after the All-Star break. Votto hit .408/.490/.668 in the second half, between July 15 and the season's end on October 2.

Votto's .326 season average was the second-best of his career, behind only his 2012 season, where he hit .337. Votto hit 29 home runs, second only to his 2010 Most Valuable Player award season.

Votto finished the season with a .326 batting average (3rd in the NL), .435 on-base percentage (leading the NL), and .550 slugging percentage (6th in the NL). He also had 108 walks, 29 home runs, and 97 RBI (10th in the NL), while playing 158 games for the second straight season. He was also among the NL leaders in on-base plus slugging (.985, 2nd), walks (tied for 2nd), hits (8th), runs (9th), and total bases (306, 10th). He became the 10th player in major league history to lead his league in on-base percentage at least five times; the only players who had done it more years were Barry Bonds (10) and Hall of Famers Ted Williams (12), Babe Ruth (10), Rogers Hornsby (9), Ty Cobb (7), Wade Boggs (6), and Stan Musial (6). By the end of his career, he would tie Cobb in leading the league seven times.

==== 2017 season ====
Votto finished the first half of the 2017 season with a batting average of .315, an on-base percentage of .427, and a slugging percentage of .614 while slugging 26 home runs, which tied for the National League lead with Marlins outfielder Giancarlo Stanton. This performance earned Votto his fifth career All-Star appearance as a substitute. He was also known for his promise to buy teammate Zack Cozart a donkey for making the 2017 All-Star Game. After many interviews and an appearance in a donkey suit on MLB Network's Intentional Talk, Cozart won the fan vote and made the cut as the National League starting shortstop. Votto upheld his end of the deal, buying Cozart a donkey named Donald. As the second half of the season passed, the Reds continued to struggle, but Votto did just the opposite. Late in the year, Votto had a streak of consecutive games reaching base multiple times, which spanned 20 games and was the second longest in major league history behind Ted Williams' 1948 record of 21.

He finished the year with a stat-line that included a .319 batting average (4th in the NL), a .578 slugging percentage (7th), 106 runs scored (6th), 36 homers (6th), and 100 runs batted in (10th). He led the league in on-base percentage at .454, on-base percentage plus slugging average (at 1.032), in walks for the fifth season (134), in walk percentage (at 19%), and in walks per strikeout (at 1.61), while leading the majors in intentional walks (20). He had 8.1 wins above replacement according to Baseball Reference, the highest of his career and best in the NL that year. Votto's homer total was one under his 2010 season as well. Votto became the first Reds player since Pete Rose in 1975 to start all 162 regular season games in a season and just the fourth player in franchise history to do so. He swung at only 15.8% of pitches outside the strike zone, the lowest rate in the majors. Among all active players at the end of the season, he was first in career on-base percentage (.428), second in on-base plus slugging (.969), third in batting average (.313), fourth in walks (996), and fifth in slugging percentage (.541).

End-of-season awards for Votto included selection as first baseman on Baseball America's All-MLB Team and his second Lou Marsh Trophy. Votto also finished second in the National League Most Valuable Player award voting, narrowly losing out to Giancarlo Stanton by two votes in the fourth-closest vote in major league history.

==== 2018 season ====
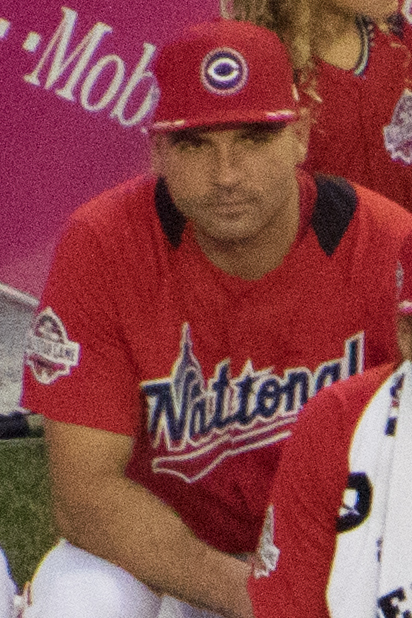
Votto at the 2018 Major League Baseball Home Run Derby

With eight home runs and 44 RBIs by early July, Votto was named to the 2018 MLB All-Star Game. For the season, he batted .284, had an on-base percentage of .417 and a slugging average of .419. He led the National League in on-base percentage for the third year in a row and for the final time in his career. He swung at only 16.4% of pitches outside the strike zone (the lowest percentage in the majors).

Votto became the sixth player in major league history to lead his league in on-base percentage at least seven times, following Ted Williams (12), Barry Bonds and Babe Ruth (10 each), Rogers Hornsby (9), and Ty Cobb (7).

==== 2019 season ====
In 2019, Votto batted .261, had an on-base percentage of .357 and a slugging average of .411 with 15 home runs and 47 RBIs. He swung at the lowest percentage of pitches outside the strike zone of all National League batters (21.1%), and had the lowest Soft Contact Percentage of all major league batters, at 10.1%. He hit a pop-out to first base for the first time in his career on April 17 (which was his 6,829th plate appearance).

==== 2020 season ====
On September 20, Votto drew the 1,211th walk of his career, passing Pete Rose for the most in Reds history.

In the pandemic-shortened 2020 regular season, Votto played in 53 games. He had 223 plate appearances and batted .226, had an on-base percentage of .354, and a slugging percentage of .446, with 11 home runs and 22 runs batted in. He was the ninth-oldest player in the National League.

==== 2021 season ====
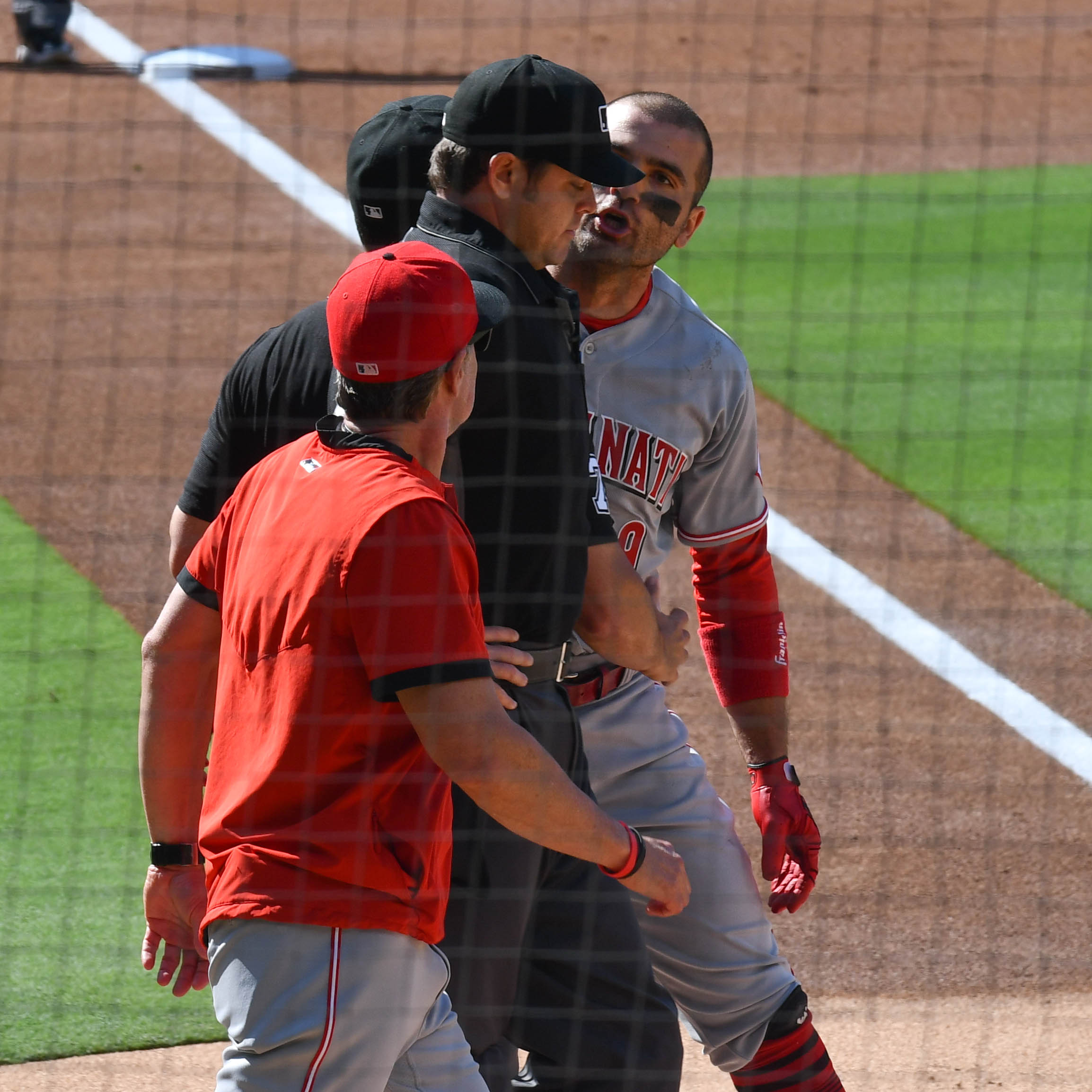
Votto arguing with the home plate umpire after being ejected from a game on June 19, 2021

On April 17, Votto nearly completed an unassisted triple play in a game against Cleveland. In the top of the eighth inning with no outs and baserunners at first base and third base, the batter hit a line drive to the right side of the infield—Votto caught the ball (first out) and tagged the runner from first base before he could return there (second out). Meanwhile, the runner from third base had gone all the way home without tagging up; while Votto could easily have gone and stepped on third base to complete the triple play, he threw the ball to the third baseman to end the inning.

On April 30, Votto hit his 300th career home run, a go-ahead home run in the bottom of the third inning versus the Chicago Cubs. On May 5, Votto was hit by a pitch from Dallas Keuchel, fracturing his left thumb. He was placed on the 10 day injured list, not returning to play until June 8.

On June 19, Votto was ejected from a game for arguing a checked swing third strike call during a game against the San Diego Padres. He was restrained by the Reds' coaching staff during the argument and later received a two-game suspension and an undisclosed fine for his conduct. After an appeal, the suspension was reduced to one game. Votto served his suspension during a game against the Minnesota Twins on June 22. On June 30, Votto hit a home run against Joe Musgrove of the San Diego Padres, notching his 1,000th career RBI of his career, all with the Reds. He is one of five players to have driven in 1,000 runs as a Red. On July 30, in a game against the New York Mets, Votto hit a home run, which marked his seventh straight game with a home run alongside setting a club record for most games with a home run. The streak ended the next night, when he failed to hit a home run, falling one short of tying the league record for most consecutive games with a home run, though Votto became the oldest player to hit nine home runs in seven games. He was named NL Player of the Month for July 2021. On August 16, Votto collected his 2,000th career hit, a single off Cubs reliever Michael Rucker.

Votto finished the 2021 season hitting .266 with 36 home runs and 99 RBI. He had the lowest percentage of softly hit balls among all qualified batters, at 8.0%.

==== 2022 season ====
Votto's 2022 season was hampered by injuries and an especially poor start to the year. On August 14, 2022, Votto played in his 1,989th career game, passing Larry Walker for the most major league games played by a Canadian-born player. He underwent season-ending surgery to repair a torn left rotator cuff on August 19. Votto said the injury dated back to 2015 but strength training had enabled him to play through the discomfort. He finished with what were then-career lows in batting average, on-base percentage, and slugging percentage.

After his surgery, Votto appeared in the Reds' television broadcast booth several times during the remainder of the season.

==== 2023 season ====
Votto appeared in 65 games in the 2023 season, finishing with a .202 batting average. He played in his 2,000th game on June 30 against the Padres. He hit his last home run against Andrew Suárez of the Cardinals on September 10. The final hit of his career was a single against the Pirates' Andre Jackson on September 24, and his final times on base were in a game when he earned three base on balls against the Cleveland Guardians on September 26.

Votto struck out in his final major league at-bat on October 1. He was ejected after the play by home plate umpire Shane Livensparger for yelling from the dugout that the third pitch in the at bat should have been called a ball. After the ejection, Votto approached Livensparger, recalling that he was not angry, and said, "That ball was inside. This could be my last game!" The umpire replied, "Then why'd you get thrown out, Joey?" Votto said he let his emotions get the best of him and that Livensparger was right to eject him. Votto became a free agent for the first time in his career following the 2023 season.

=== Toronto Blue Jays ===
On March 9, 2024, Votto signed a minor league contract with the Toronto Blue Jays that included an invitation to spring training. Votto injured his ankle during that time, which kept him on the injured list through July. He appeared in 15 games for the Buffalo Bisons, the Blue Jays' Triple-A affiliate, where he had a batting average of .143. He never played for the Blue Jays, as he announced his retirement from professional baseball on August 21. At the time, the Reds were about to complete a series against the Blue Jays in Toronto.

== International career ==
Votto played for Canada in the 2009 World Baseball Classic. In Canada's first game against the United States, he had four hits, including one home run, in five at-bats as Canada lost, 6–5. Votto had a double and walk in five plate appearances in Canada's second and final game of the tournament, a 6–2 loss to Italy.

Votto played for Canada in the 2013 World Baseball Classic. He led Canada with five runs and five walks in three games.

== Broadcasting career ==
In February 2026, it was announced that Votto would serve as a commentator for NBC Sports' MLB pregame coverage, beginning with the 2026 MLB season.

== Player profile ==
Votto had a career .294 batting average, 356 home runs, and 1,144 runs batted in. He led the National League in bases on balls with 110 in 2011; despite missing 51 games in 2012, he led the league in that category. His career on-base percentage is .409, and he exceeded the .400 on-base percentage plateau in nine seasons. He led the National League in that category seven times (from 2010 to 2013, and 2016 to 2018). Despite posting an on-base percentage of .459 in 2015 (second highest of his career), Votto finished second to Bryce Harper's .460 that season. Votto had three 3-home run games in his MLB career; Votto and Johnny Bench share the Reds record for three 3-home run games.

Votto led the league in assists (with 136) for first basemen in 2008, a feat he repeated in consecutive seasons in 2011 and 2012. He finished fifth in 2009 with 101 assists and second in 2010 with 128 assists. In 2011, he also led all National League first basemen in putouts (1,341), and he was third in fielding percentage (.996). That year, he won his first Gold Glove Award.

== Personal life ==
Votto was described in a 2021 profile in The Athletic as perhaps "the most interesting man in baseball." Teammates described him as "his own man," "a genius" and "on a different wavelength than most people." Whitney McIntosh of SB Nation described him as a "magnificent weirdo" in 2015. During the COVID-19 pandemic, Votto began using social media for the first time to combat feelings of isolation and engage with fans. His TikTok and Instagram posts quickly became popular, as Votto created videos with family and Reds staff. Votto frequently posted about his love of chess and has appeared at multiple local competitive chess tournaments in Toronto.

Votto has described himself as an introvert. In 2009, he missed games due to stress and other mental health concerns. He later opened up about having suffered panic attacks, being hospitalized and being diagnosed as depressed. Votto has said that, early in his career, he lacked confidence, was burnt out due to his self-imposed expectations, and had no social life.

His feelings of isolation reached a breaking point after the 2017 season when the Reds traded away some of his closest friends in the clubhouse, including Jay Bruce and Johnny Cueto. Feeling "a little worn out," he began pursuing interests outside of baseball in earnest for the first time. After years of loosening up and expanding his life off the field, in September 2023 he was able to say, "This is the first time in my career I realize that I love what I do."

Votto has three brothers: Tyler, and twin brothers named Ryan and Paul. Votto had a mastiff-golden retriever mix named Maris, who was named after former baseball player Roger Maris. Votto got Maris from a shelter in Kentucky in 2010. He gave the dog the ball from his first MLB hit, which the dog chewed up. Maris the dog died in 2020.

In May 2018, The Cincinnati Enquirer reported that Votto, who was already fluent in French, had for several years been studying Spanish through Rosetta Stone and then with a tutor in order to better communicate with teammates. In February 2023, he said that he was taking Spanish lessons "for an hour and a half, two hours three times a week," at least in part because he hoped to work in the Dominican Republic and the minor leagues.

Despite his taking language lessons, dancing lessons (in salsa, merengue and breakdancing), chess lessons from a grandmaster and improv classes, Votto has described himself as being of "below-average curiosity."

In June 2020, in the wake of the murder of George Floyd, he wrote an op-ed in The Cincinnati Enquirer in which he described coming to terms with his own white privilege and exploring systemic racism.

In 2021, he finished his sophomore year as a geography major at the University of Florida.

In January 2022, he became a United States citizen in a ceremony in the United States District Court for the Southern District of Ohio.

In March 2026, Votto donated a custom-built Reds-themed clock outside of Great American Ball Park to the Reds and the City of Cincinnati, just days before Opening Day.

Votto is represented by sports agent Dan Lozano.

== Career awards and honors ==
=== Major leagues ===
- National League (NL) Most Valuable Player (2010)
- NL Hank Aaron Award: (2010)
- NL All-Star: 2010–2013, 2017, 2018
- NL Gold Glove Award (first base): 2011
- Lou Marsh Trophy (Canada's top athlete): 2010, 2017
- Tip O'Neill Award (Canada's best baseball player): 2010, 2012, 2013, 2015–2017
- Lou Gehrig Memorial Award: 2017
- Ernie Lombardi Award (Reds MVP): 2010
- Syl Apps Athlete of the Year Award (Ontario athlete of the year): 2010
- NL Player of the Month: July 2021
- NL Player of the Week:
  - September 21–27, 2009
  - July 25–31, 2011
  - May 13–19, 2013
  - June 26–July 2, 2017
  - April 23–29, 2018
  - July 26–August 1, 2021
- NL Rookie of the Month: September 2008

=== Minor leagues ===
- 2007 (Louisville, International League):
  - Post-season All Star
  - Mid-season All Star
  - Rookie of the Year
  - Baseball America Triple-A All Star
- 2006 (Chattanooga, Southern League):
  - Most Valuable Player
  - Baseball America Double-A All Star
  - Mid-season All Star
  - Post-season All Star

== See also ==
- Major League Baseball titles leaders
- List of Major League Baseball annual putouts leaders
- List of Major League Baseball career assists as a first baseman leaders
- List of Major League Baseball career bases on balls leaders
- List of Major League Baseball career doubles leaders
- List of Major League Baseball career hits leaders
- List of Major League Baseball career intentional bases on balls leaders
- List of Major League Baseball career on-base percentage leaders
- List of Major League Baseball career OPS leaders
- List of Major League Baseball career runs batted in leaders
- List of Major League Baseball career slugging percentage leaders
- List of Major League Baseball players from Canada
- List of Major League Baseball players who spent their entire career with one franchise

Awards and achievements
Preceded by Albert Pujols; Bryce Harper	National League annual on-base percentage leader 2010—2013; 2016—2018	Succeeded by Andrew McCutchen; Christian Yelich
Preceded by Kyle Schwarber	National League Player of the Month; July 2021	Succeeded by C. J. Cron
