= École secondaire Saint-Edmond =

Location
- 346 Hubert Street; Greenfield Park, Longueuil, Quebec, J4V 1S2; Canada; 45.488753°N 73.487249°W

Information
- School type: Public, Secondary school
- School board: Centre de services scolaire Marie-Victorin
- Director: Benoit Pilon
- Grades: 7-11
- Language: French
- Area: Urban agglomeration of Longueuil
- Communities served: LeMoyne, Greenfield Park, Saint-Lambert
- Website: saint-edmond.cssmv.gouv.qc.ca

École secondaire Saint-Edmond is a public French-language secondary school in Longueuil, Quebec, Canada. Its address is 346 Hubert Street in the borough of Greenfield Park.
