= Craig Norman =

Canadian basketball player

Craig Norman is a native of Greenfield Park, Quebec. He was appointed full-time head coach of the McGill University Redmen in June 2004, after winning Canadian University Coach of the Year honours in men's basketball during the 2003-04 season, as head coach at Royal Military College in Kingston, Ontario. He coached there for six seasons starting in 1998.

Norman obtained his Level 4 basketball coaching certification under the tutelage of legendary national team coach Jack Donohue (high school coach of Lew Alcindor, later known as Kareem Abdul-Jabbar). He took over a struggling RMC program and made them a contender. The Paladins, who finished 1-21 in 2001-02, had a 14-8 second-place record, behind the national champion Carleton Ravens, in the OUA East the following year.

Norman was subsequently named OUA Basketball Conference Coach of the Year, then received the Stuart W. Aberdeen Memorial Trophy as CIS Coach of the Year.

His other previous head coaching stints were at Dawson College (1990–92) in Montreal and Champlain Regional College (1995–98) in Saint-Lambert, Quebec.

He played five seasons at Concordia University for the Concordia Stingers, earning all-Canadian second-team honours in 1986-87. He was also a member of the Quebec provincial team and spent three years at Dawson College, where he was a CCAA All-Canadian in 1982.

He married Kathryn Campbell in July 2005.
