= Greenfield Park, Quebec =

Greenfield Park
- Borough of Longueuil
- Flag Coat of arms
- Motto(s): Fortis Fortunam Superat (Latin for "Fortune Favours the Brave")
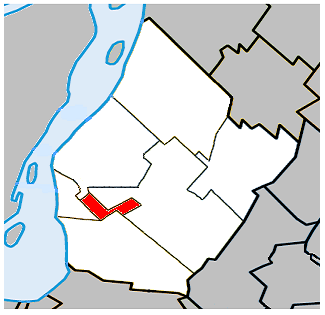
- Location within Urban Agglomeration of Longueuil.

- Location in southern Quebec.
- Coordinates: 45.492°N 73.487°W
- Country: Canada
- Province: Quebec
- City: Longueuil
- Established: March 24, 1911
- Merger with Longueuil: January 1, 2002
- Electoral Districts Federal: Longueuil—Charles-LeMoyne
- Provincial: Laporte

Government
  - Type: Borough
  - Borough President: Sylvain Joly (OGP)
  - Federal MP(s): Sherry Romanado (LPC)
  - Quebec MNA(s): Isabelle Poulet (CAQ)

Area
  - Land: 4.78 km^{2} (1.85 sq mi)

Population (2016)
  - Total: 16,733
  - Density: 3,500.6/km^{2} (9,067/sq mi)
  - Change (2011-16): ▼1.4%
  - Dwellings: 7,457
- Time zone: UTC−05:00 (EST)
  - Summer (DST): UTC−04:00 (EDT)
- Postal code(s): J4V
- Area code: 450
- Access Routes: R-134
- Website: Webpage

Greenfield Park is a former city in southwestern Quebec, Canada. It is currently a borough of the city of Longueuil. It covers an area of 4.78 square kilometres (1.85 sq mi), with a population of 16,733 at the 2016 census of Canada. Greenfield Park is the only borough of Longueuil that has an officially bilingual status. It is primarily a post-WWI suburban area. Like the other two boroughs, most of the buildings in Greenfield Park are single-family homes. Nearly all of the land in Greenfield Park is built on, making it Longueuil's most densely populated borough.

Greenfield Park is divided into two sections. The older section of the borough is to the west of Taschereau Boulevard near Saint-Lambert, LeMoyne and Brossard, while the newer section is to the east, near the Saint-Hubert borough. Most of the Greenfield Park's businesses are located along Taschereau Boulevard, the south shore's most important commercial artery. The Charles LeMoyne Hospital, located on the Taschereau Boulevard, is the largest on the south shore.

== History ==
=== Seigneury of Longueuil ===
Before becoming a town, the area known as Greenfield Park was land belonging to the Seigneury of Longueuil. It had been an agricultural area up until the end of the 19th century. Greenfield Park benefited from its proximity to neighbouring St. Lambert's rail line connected to the newly constructed Victoria Bridge, which was the only major rail link between Montreal and the South Shore. At the time, the bridge was the longest railway bridge in the world. Development had begun to spread into Greenfield Park, which merited the establishment of a town to provide services for the population.

=== Town ===
Greenfield Park was named after the area's primary geographical features, which were in fact green fields and forests. The town was established on March 24, 1911. The original Charter of Greenfield Park gave reasoning for the town's creation:

Whereas the rate-payers of the territory comprised in cadastral lots Nos . 225 to 244 of the parish of Longueuil have by a large majority in number and value represented that, in consequence of the rapid increase of population within the said territory being a suburb of the city of Montreal and in consequence of the necessity for local improvements similar to those of other suburbs of Montreal, it is necessary that the said territory be created into a separate municipality and they have prayed, that the general principles of the Cities and Towns' Act be applied to the said municipality and also that they be granted several powers similar to those of other suburbs of Montreal which are not contained in said act . . .

With the creation of the town came to need to put infrastructure and services in place. The only way for citizens to reach nearby Montreal was by rail, through the Grand Trunk Railway or the Montreal and Southern Counties Railway. In 1913, Greenfield Park, along with neighbouring municipalities St. Lambert, Montreal South and Longueuil, built a shared sewer system and water filtration plant. The town also used artesian wells as a source for drinking water.

=== World War I and II ===
During World War I, such a high percentage of Greenfield Parkers served in the Canadian forces that regular town meetings could not be held. Similarly, in World War II, Greenfield Park was the Canadian community that had one of the highest participation rate of military volunteers for its size. This fact was recognized by both Prime Minister William Lyon Mackenzie King and the Minister of National Defence, J.L. Ralston.

Following the war, returning veterans were able to purchase homes with financial assistance through a purchasing program put into place by the town.

=== Late 20th Century ===
In the early 1960s, Greenfield Park acquired 40 percent more land by annexing part of Saint-Hubert. This land was located on the opposite side of Taschereau, and a large amount of veterans housing was built on these lands, particularly along Bellevue Street North. During the early 60s, over 60% of the town's population traced their ancestry to the United Kingdom, roughly half of that number live in the town today.

=== Merger with Longueuil ===
Greenfield Park was a town until January 1, 2002, when it along with several other suburbs on Montreal's South Shore were merged into the amalgamated city of Longueuil. (On January 1, 2006, Boucherville, Brossard, Saint-Bruno-de-Montarville and Saint-Lambert were "demerged", or reconstituted.) Following these demergers, Greenfield Park became one of only three remaining boroughs of Longueuil, along with Saint-Hubert and Le Vieux-Longueuil.

== Government ==
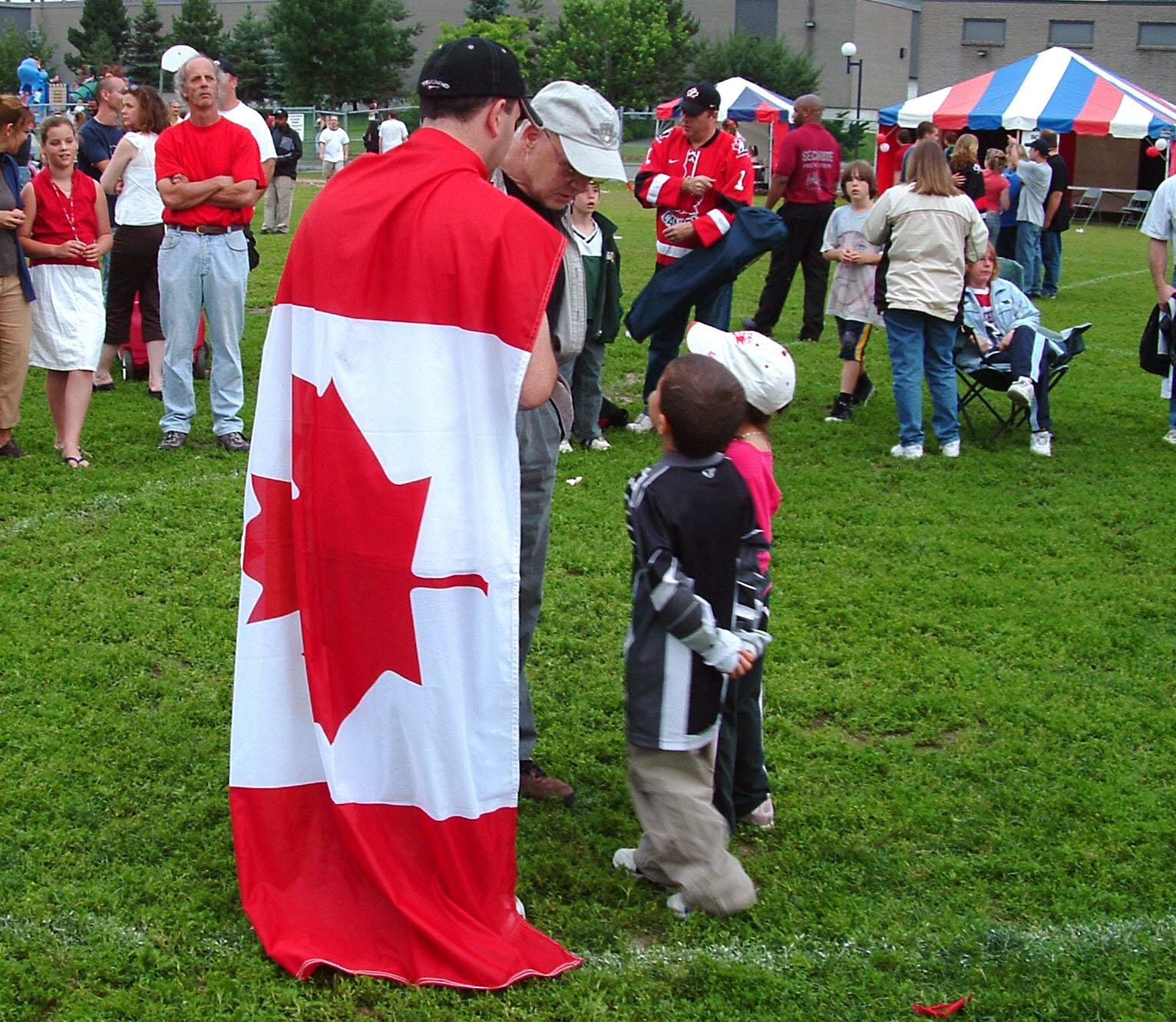
Canada Day is celebrated annually at Empire Park.

=== Municipal ===
Greenfield Park is represented by one city councillor in Longueuil City Council and two borough councillors. The borough president is Sylvain Joly of Option Greenfield Park. As of the November 7, 2021 Longueuil municipal election (see 2021 Quebec municipal elections#Longueuil), the current borough council consists of the following councillors:

Greenfield Park Borough Council
Title	Party	Councillor
City Councillor	Coalition Longueuil	Sylvain Joly
Borough Councillor 1	Coalition Longueuil	Éric Normandin
Borough Councillor 2	Coalition Longueuil	Christopher Keays

Coat of Arms

Greenfield Park's coat of arms is golden, with a sable reversed chevron. The chevron supports a sinople coloured tree. Below the chevron are two red roses. Above the shield is a crown, shaped like a wall with five turrets. The shield is surrounded by branches of maple. Below the shield the branches meet, tied with a red and black ribbon. The Greenfield Park motto, "Fortis Fortunam Superat," or "Fortune Favors the Brave," is attributed to Villar.

Former Mayors of Greenfield Park
Mayor	Term Began	Term Ended
William J. Murray	1911	1915
Robert Smith Chalmers	1915	1918
Robert J. Walker	1918	1922
Colin Duncan Campbell	1922	1926
Robert J. Walker	1927	1928
Herbert Wall Clarke	1929	1930
Ernest A. Nightingale	1930	1932
Stanley Isaac Coote	1932	1940
Edward Frank Backhoven	1940	1942
Alfred George Cobb	1942	1946
Aban Perras	1946	1948
Joseph. C. Plante	1948	1953
Lawrence J. Galletti	1953	1967
Maurice J. King	1967	1978
Stephen Olynyk	1978	1994
Marc Duclos jr	1994	2001
Part of Longueuil	2002	present

=== Federal and provincial ===
Greenfield Park is in the federal riding of Longueuil—Charles-LeMoyne and its Member of Parliament is Sherry Romanado (Liberal Party of Canada). It also belongs to the provincial riding of Laporte and its Member of the National Assembly is Nicole Ménard (Quebec Liberal Party).

== Demographics ==
Historical populations
Year	Pop.	±%
1921	1,112	—
1931	1,610	+44.8%
1941	1,819	+13.0%
1951	3,379	+85.8%
1961	7,807	+131.0%
1971	15,348	+96.6%
1981	18,527	+20.7%
1991	17,652	−4.7%
1996	17,337	−1.8%
2001	16,978	−2.1%
2006	17,084	+0.6%
2011	16,969	−0.7%
2016	16,733	−1.4%

Home language
Language	Population	Percentage (%)
French	8,005	47.13%
English	6,765	39.83%
Both English and French	385	2.27%
Other languages	1,825	10.74%

Mother tongue language
Language	1996	2001	2006	2011	2016
French	46.9%	48.7%	46.5%	50%	49%
English	36.7%	35.2%	33.6%	29.2%	26.1%
English and French	1.9%	1.9%	1.7%	1.8%	1.9%
Non-official languages	13%	13.5%	17.6%	18.1%	20.4%
Population	17,335	16,978	17,084	16,505	16,733

== Education ==
Centennial Regional High School is an English language secondary school.

The Riverside School Board operates public schools.

The South Shore Protestant Regional School Board previously served the municipality.

Primary

- Greenfield Park International/École Internationale de Greenfield Park
- St-Jude Elementary
- École Primaire Pierre Laporte

Secondary

- Centennial Regional High School
- École Secondaire Participative l'Agora
- École Internationale Saint-Edmond

Adult Education

- CEA des 16–18 ans

== Attractions ==
There are nine parks in Greenfield Park: Fairfield Park, Iellamo Park, Jubilee Park, Empire Park, Regent Park, René-Veillet Park, Saint-Judes Park, Stephen-Olynyk Park and Watson Park. Empire Park hosts junior football and baseball teams. Cynthia Coull Arena hosts the local minor hockey association.

There are seven churches in Greenfield Park. There are two Roman Catholic churches, Saint Mary Church serves anglophones and Église Sainte-Marguerite-Bourgeoys serves francophones. There are four Protestantism churches, St. Paul's Anglican Church (Anglican), Greenfield Park United Church (United Church of Canada), Greenfield Park Baptist Church (Baptist), South Shore Community Church (Pentecostal). There is also a Latter-day Saint chapel where two wards (one for anglophones, one for francophones) meet.

Shopping centres are located on Taschereau Boulevard and include 5000 Taschereau (formerly Mail Carnaval), Place Greenfield Park and Les Galeries Taschereau.

== Transport ==
=== Réseau de transport de Longueuil ===
Bus service in Greenfield Park is provided by the Réseau de transport de Longueuil.

Réseau de transport de Longueuil
No.	Route	Connects to	Service times / notes
4 ♿︎	Taschereau / Payer / DIX30	Longueuil–Université-de-Sherbrooke; Brossard	Regular
6 ♿︎	Victoria	Longueuil–Université-de-Sherbrooke; Panama	Regular
15 ♿︎	Riverside / Alexandra / Churchill	Longueuil–Université-de-Sherbrooke; Panama	Regular
21 ♿︎	Grande-Allée / du Quartier	Longueuil–Université-de-Sherbrooke; Du Quartier	Regular
34	Secteur A Brossard / Bellevue	Panama	Rush hour only
54	Tiffin / Saint-Georges / Taschereau	Longueuil–Université-de-Sherbrooke; Panama	Regular
59	Montgomery / Gareau	Panama	Rush hour only
77 ♿︎	Taschereau / Coteau-Rouge / Cégep-É.-Montpetit	Panama	Regular

=== Important roadways ===
- Victoria Avenue
- Churchill Boulevard
- Taschereau Boulevard

== Notable people ==
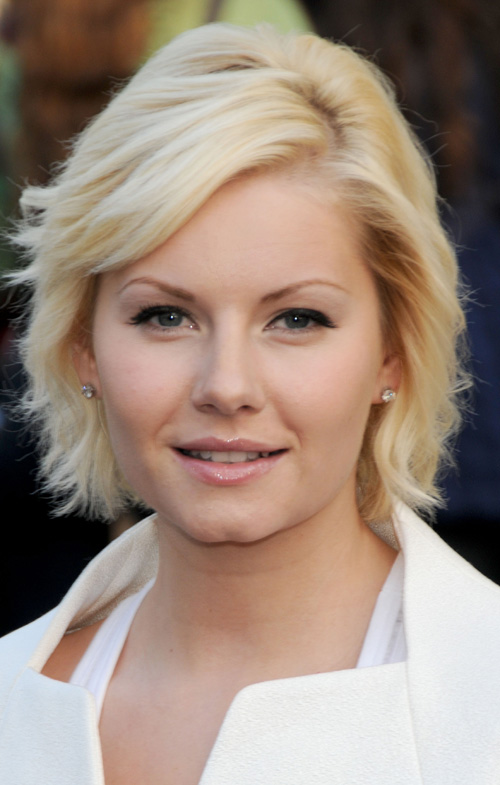
Elisha Cuthbert is an actress best known for her role on 24.

- Paul Adey, international hockey player
- Ian Boothby, writer, comedian
- Cynthia Coull, former Olympic figure skater
- Sylvain Couturier, hockey player
- Maxime Crépeau, soccer player
- Steven Crowder, actor, right wing American political commentator was raised in Greenfield Park.
- Elisha Cuthbert, actress
- Garry Galley, former NHL player
- Steve Green, professional baseball player
- Émilie Heymans, Olympic diver
- Connie Kaldor, Canadian folk singer/songwriter
- Anthony Kavanagh, stand-up comic
- Charline Labonte, hockey goaltender who won a gold medal for Canada at the 2014 Sochi Winter Olympics.
- Julie Masse, singer
- Torrey Mitchell, NHL player
- Isabelle Morneau, soccer player
- Craig Norman, basketball coach
- Nils Oliveto, actor/screenwriter
- Kevin Parent, singer/songwriter
- François-Philippe Champagne, politician and federal Minister of Innovation, Science and Industry since 2021
- Stéphane Roy, electroacoustic music composer
- Jerome Samson, NHL player
- Myriane Samson, figure skater
- Julie Snyder, television presenter
- Tod Fennell, actor, voice actor
- Wally Weir, former NHL player

== See also ==
- Municipal reorganization in Quebec
- List of former cities in Quebec
- List of mayors of Longueuil
- Longueuil City Council
- Boroughs of Longueuil
- Urban agglomeration of Longueuil
