= Nils Oliveto =

Canadian actor

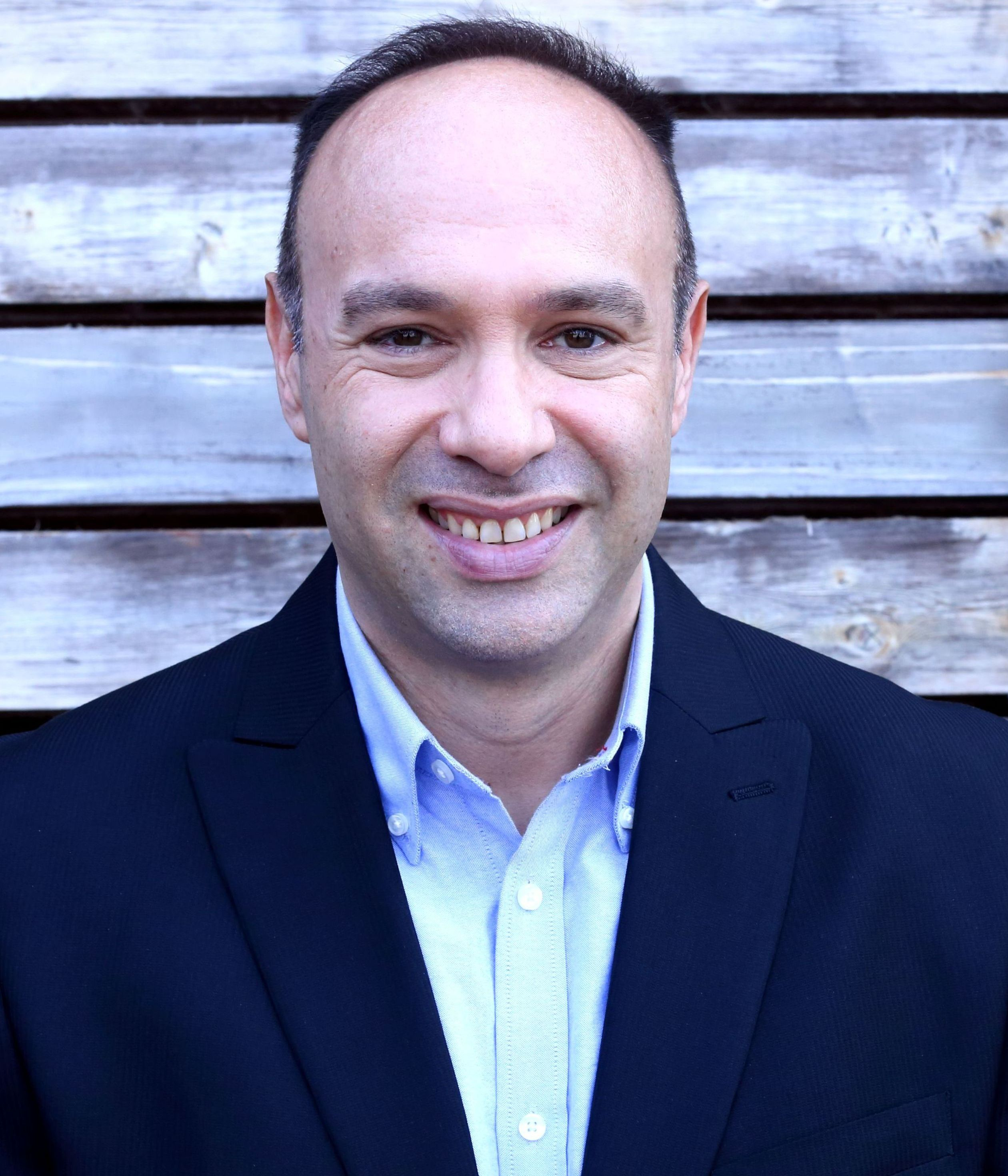
- Born: December 8, 1974 (age 51); Greenfield Park, Quebec, Canada
- Occupations: Olympic sports analyst, actor, director, screenwriter, producer, author, motivational speaker

Nils Oliveto (born December 8, 1974) is a Canadian Olympic colour-commentator, actor, director, producer, screenwriter, motivational speaker and TV sports broadcaster.

== Early life ==
Nils Oliveto grew up in Greenfield Park, Quebec (now part of Longueuil). He was actively involved in theatre and improvisation, but his passion was into sports, where he played volleyball and soccer at Royal George High School in Greenfield Park. At 16, he began training seriously as a track and field athlete, and started getting national attention in both the discus and the hammer throw. After graduating from Royal George as the co-president of the Student Council and winning the Athlete of the Year award, he attended Champlain College Saint-Lambert under the tutor of former Czechoslovak weight-lifting Olympic coach Emil Muller. In 1993, he earned a spot on the Canadian Jr. National Track and Field Team as a hammer thrower. After completing a degree in Pure and Applied Science in 1995 from Champlain College, Oliveto was offered a track scholarship at the University of Oklahoma. From 1995 to 2000, Oliveto traveled all over North-America, Europe, and Africa, competing in major championships like the Canada Games, the Jeux de la Francophonie, and the Olympic Trials.

He graduated with both a Bachelor of Science degree (Health and Sports Science, 1998) and a Master of Science degree (Exercise Physiology and Human Performance, 2000) with a thesis research in performance periodization from OU. He was the University of Oklahoma record holder in the hammer throw, and is still the current all-time powerlifting record holder at Champlain College.

== Acting / Filmmaking ==
The acting bug hit Nils when he was encouraged by a former drama high school teacher to pursue acting professionally. While in Oklahoma, he started studying acting and screenwriting with the OU Film Department, and later began working on local TV projects in Oklahoma City and Tulsa. In 2000, Nils moved to Los Angeles, where he jumped into the big leagues. He continued studying his craft in Burbank, California with top TV and film actors.

Nils has participated in projects including scientific articles on periodization in exercise physiology, physical education teaching, applied kinesiology in clinical osteopathy, and stress management, visualization, and autogenic training for high performance. He applies these fields to his work as an actor and his performances on stage.

Through his production company HAMMERMAN FILMS, Nils produced, wrote, directed and starred in For the Love of Poe, which premiered in Montreal at the Festival des Films du Monde (Montreal World Film Festival) in August 2014. This project, with two separate original versions (English and French), tells the story of an ex-convict and a beloved fan of Edgar Allan Poe who is commissioned by a world-class smuggler to find three artifacts with supposedly supernatural powers dating back from Francisco Pizarro's conquest of the Incas in the 1500s.

In 2017, Nils premiered Objects in Mirror are Closer than they Appear at Cinema Imperial in Montreal. It tells the story of a man attempts to free himself from a fragile emotional state after being dumped at the altar by his fiancée on his wedding day. Inspired by the long takes of legendary European director Chantal Akerman as well as the tatami shot of Japanese master Yasujiro Ozu, Oliveto's minimalist experimental contemplative cinema style seeks to explore the human emotion on an alienated character through unorthodox cinematic means.

Nils Oliveto presented his first documentary feature in Montreal in September 2018. Icelander tells the story of a son looking for his father 20 years after his unexplained disappearance. It won 2nd prize in the Documentary of the World competition at the Montreal World Film Festival (FFM) and won Best Screenplay / Best Autobiography at the 2020 Los Angeles Documentary (DOC LA) Film festival.

Filmed on location in Montreal, Confessionem was presented as a World Premiere at the legendary TCL Chinese Theater in March 2022. Produced, written, and directed by Nils. It is one of the lengthiest principal photography in independent cinema with a decade long shoot from 2009 to 2019. Confessionem is the story of a man with a dark past who decides to confess his last ten years of crimes at church. The film offers an oneiric moviemaking experience by transposing a surreal plot into an aesthetically distinctive cinema style. Confessionem won Best International feature at the Golden State Film Festival in Los Angeles and Best Editing at the Silver State Film Festival in Las Vegas.

== TV/Radio broadcasting ==
Nils Oliveto joined CBC Radio-Canada Sport in 2017 as an Olympic sports analyst in track & field and winter sliding events (bobsleigh, luge, skeleton). He covered the 2017 World Bobsleigh Championships (Königssee, Germany), the 2017-2019-2022-2023 World Championships of Athletics (London, Doha, Eugene, Budapest), the 2018-2026 Olympic Winter Games (Pyeongchang, Korea / Beijing, China / Milano-Cortina 2026), the 2020-2024 Olympic and Paralympic Summer Games (Tokyo, Japan / Paris, France).

In January 2022, Nils released the book ‘’Winter HAIKUlimpics: capturing the poetic spirit of wintertime sports’’ a month before the start of the 2022 Winter Olympic Games in Beijing, China. This poetry book is the first of its kind to combine lyrical moments of insights characterized by Japanese haikus with winter sporting events.‘’Summer HAIKUlimpics‘’ was released in 2024 to commemorate the Paris Summer Olympic Games

Nils also periodically does radio shows and his a published scientific author in sports performance journals (NSCA Journal / USA Track & Field Track Coach).

== External links / References ==
- Nils Oliveto at IMDb
- The Gazette video
- La Presse ,, ,
- Instagram
