= Steinmetz =

Steinmetz or Steynmets is a German and Jewish surname, meaning 'stonemason'. It may refer to:

== People ==
- Ádám Steinmetz (born 1980), Hungarian water polo player
- Andrew Steinmetz (born 1965), Canadian writer
- Barnabás Steinmetz (born 1975), Hungarian water polo player
- Beny Steinmetz (born 1956), Israeli businessman
- Bill Steinmetz (1899–1988), American speed skater
- Charles Proteus Steinmetz (1865–1923), German-born American electrical engineer and inventor
- Charlotte Steinmetz (born 1994), German politician
- Cheri Steinmetz, American politician
- Chris Steinmetz (born 1966), American record producer
- Christian Steinmetz (1882–1963), American basketball player
- Connie Steinmetz, American politician
- David Steinmetz (disambiguation), multiple people
- Donald W. Steinmetz (1924–2013), American judge
- Elliot Steinmetz (born 1980), American basketball coach
- Francis Steinmetz (1914–2006), Dutch officer
- George Steinmetz (born 1957), American photographer
- George Steinmetz (academic) (born 1957), American sociologist
- Geremias Steinmetz (born 1965), Brazilian archbishop
- Greg Steinmetz (born 1950), American journalist
- Isidora Steinmetz (born 1994), Chilean volleyball player
- Jacob Steinmetz (born 2003), American, first Orthodox Jewish player drafted in Major League Baseball
- János Steinmetz (1947–2007), Hungarian water polo player
- Johann Adam Steinmetz (1689–1762), German theologian
- John D. Steinmetz, American banking executive
- Joseph E. Steinmetz (born 1955), American academic
- Joseph Janney Steinmetz, American photographer
- Jürgen Steinmetz, German guitarist
- Karl Friedrich Franciscus von Steinmetz (1768–1837), Prussian officer
- Karl Friedrich von Steinmetz (1796–1877), Prussian field marshal
- Kim Steinmetz (born 1957), American tennis player
- Klement Steinmetz (1915–2001), Austrian footballer
- Malia Steinmetz (born 1999), New Zealand footballer
- Mark Steinmetz (born 1961), American photographer
- Matt Steinmetz (born 1964), American journalist
- Matthias Steinmetz (born 1966), German astronomer
- Miklós Steinmetz (1913–1944), Hungarian army officer
- Motty Steinmetz (born 1992), Hasidic singer
- Nell S. Steinmetz (1897–??), American librarian
- Paul Steinmetz (born 1977), New Zealand rugby union footballer
- Pierre Steinmetz (born 1943), French judge
- Ralf Steinmetz (born 1956), Chilean-German computer scientist
- Ricardo Steinmetz Alves (born 1988), Brazilian football 5-a-side player
- Rich Steinmetz (born 1971), American golfer
- Richard Steinmetz (born 1959), American actor
- Selma Steinmetz (1907–1979), Austrian educator
- Sol Steinmetz (1930–2010), Hungarian lexicographer
- Theodore Steinmetz (1880–1951), American musician
- Thérèse Steinmetz (born 1933), Dutch singer
- Werner Steinmetz (born 1950), German gymnast
- William Steinmetz (1847–1903), American soldier
- William G. Steinmetz (1838–1898), German-American architect

== Characters ==
- Tennessee Steinmetz, in The Love Bug
- Grandma Steinmetz, in Herbie Rides Again

== Other uses ==
- 1681 Steinmetz (1948 WE), a main-belt asteroid named after German astronomer Julius Steinmetz (1893–1965)
- IEEE Charles Proteus Steinmetz Award
- Pink Star (diamond), formerly known as the Steinmetz Pink Diamond, the largest known Vivid Pink diamond
- Steinmetz, Missouri, a community in the United States
- Steinmetz College Prep, Chicago, Illinois
- Steinmetz Opel Tuning, a German company named after Klaus A. Steinmetz
- Steinmetz solid, in geometry
- Tami Steinmetz Center for Peace Research, an academic research institution of Tel Aviv University

== See also ==
- Steimetz, people with this surname (redir)
