= Steinemann =

Steinemann is a German surname. Notable people with the surname include:

- Anne C. Steinemann (born 1961), American civil and environmental engineering academic
- Eduard Steinemann (1906–1937), Swiss gymnast who competed in the 1928 and 1936 Summer Olympics
- Eliane Steinemann, Swiss figure skater who competed in pair skating
- Urs Steinemann (born 1959), Swiss rower

== See also ==
- Steinemann Island, an island off the northeast coast of Adelaide Island, southwest of Mount Velain, Antarctica
- Steinman
- Steinmann
