= Stoneman (surname) =

Stoneman is a surname. Notable people with the surname include:

- Augustus Stoneman (1832–1905), Canadian merchant and political figure
- Bertha Stoneman (1866–1943), American born South African botanist
- Bill Stoneman (born 1944), former American pitcher in Major League Baseball
- Dean Stoneman (born 1990), British racing driver
- Dorothy Stoneman (born c. 1942), American founder and president of YouthBuild USA
- Emma Stoneman (born 1991), New Zealand water polo player
- Ernest Stoneman (1893–1968), American recording artist of country music's first commercial decade
- Ethel Stoneman (1890–1973), Australian psychologist
- George Stoneman (1822–1894), American army officer, Union cavalry general, and Governor of California
- Grant Stoneman (born 1995), American footballer
- Kate Stoneman (1841–1925), American suffragist and lawyer
- Marjory Stoneman (1890–1998), American suffragist and conservationist
- Mark Stoneman (born 1987), English cricketer
- Mark Stoneman (politician) (born 1939), Australian politician
- Paul Stoneman (born 1973), English footballer
- Roni Stoneman (1938–2024), American bluegrass banjo player
- Scotty Stoneman (1932–1973), American bluegrass and country fiddler
- Stuart Stoneman (born 1971), English cricketer
- Walter Stoneman (1876–1958), British portrait photographer

== See also ==
- Stoneman
- Steinman, Steinmann
