= Jacob Steinmetz =

American baseball player (born 2003)

Arizona Diamondbacks
- Pitcher
- Born: July 19, 2003 (age 23); Queens, New York, U.S.
- Bats: Right Throws: Right

Jacob Steinmetz (born July 19, 2003) is an American professional baseball pitcher in the Arizona Diamondbacks organization. He was selected in the third round of the 2021 Major League Baseball (MLB) draft by the Diamondbacks. He was the first practicing Orthodox Jewish player to be selected in the MLB draft. He played for Team Israel in the 2023 World Baseball Classic in Miami, Florida.

== Early life ==
Steinmetz was born in Queens, New York, to Elliot Steinmetz and Sima Steinmetz, and grew up in Woodmere, New York. His father played college basketball for Yeshiva University, is a practicing lawyer, and has been the head men's coach for the Yeshiva University Maccabees basketball team since 2014; his mother is an accountant. He was raised as a Modern Orthodox Jew, and his family is a member of Young Israel of Woodmere in Long Island.

He started playing baseball with the Young Israel of Woodmere team in the shul league. In second grade he moved on to the Hewlett-Woodmere District League in 2008. At age 7, he tried out for the Long Island Chargers travel team, and made the team. The team won the 2012 National Junior Baseball League 9U level championship, with him as the starting center fielder as he batted .415 with an on base percentage of .642, and an ERA of 3.20. He was the only Jewish player on the team, and was 4' 8" and the youngest player on the team.

== High school ==
Steinmetz attended the Orthodox Hebrew Academy of the Five Towns and Rockaway (HAFTR), where Steinmetz played baseball. He then switched to the Elev8 Baseball Academy in Delray Beach, Florida in March 2021, for two months, after his last season of high school ball with HAFTR was cancelled due to the pandemic. His travel team was the Long Island Titans Body Armor, with whom he was named the Most Valuable Pitcher as it won the 2020 PG Super25 17u Northeast Super Qualifier Championship.

Steinmetz was accepted at Fordham University on scholarship, to play NCAA Division I baseball. He decided instead to play professional baseball. Perfect Game listed him as the No. 88 overall prospect (including players from college, junior college, and high school) in the 2021 MLB Amateur Draft.

== Pitching career ==
=== Arizona Diamondbacks organization ===
Steinmetz was selected in the third round as the 77th overall pick in the 2021 Major League Baseball draft by the Arizona Diamondbacks. He signed for a below-slot $500,000. He was the first practicing Orthodox Jewish player to be selected by a major league team.

Arizona scouting director Deric Ladnier said the team liked his "delivery, body, spin rates, plus-velo.... a curveball that ... as far as the spin rates ... it's legitimately power stuff. And obviously he's got the body and the size and the projection for what you're looking for... [he's] supremely talented... we weren't taking him to make this impactful statement [by drafting an Orthodox Jewish player]. We were taking him because of his physical ability." In 2021 Steinmetz pitched one inning in the minor leagues at 17 years of age for the Arizona Complex League Diamondbacks.

In January 2022, Steinmetz was rated Arizona's #25 prospect, and he was noted for his strong curveball (which ESPN described as "knee-buckling") and a 97-mph fastball. In 2022, he pitched for the Arizona Complex League Diamondbacks at 18 years of age. He was 0–7 with a 7.88 ERA in 11 games (7 starts). He pitched 24 innings and struck out 27 batters (10.1 strikeouts per 9 innings).

== International career ==
Steinmetz played for the Israeli national baseball team in the 2023 World Baseball Classic in Miami, Florida, in March 2023, under manager Ian Kinsler and alongside All Star outfielder Joc Pederson and pitcher Dean Kremer. In Israel's third game in the 2023 World Baseball Classic, Steinmetz pitched 1 2/3 innings against the Dominican Republican and struck out Manny Machado, Jeremy Peña, and Gary Sanchez.

== Personal life ==
Steinmetz hails from Woodmere, New York and is Orthodox Jewish, keeping the Jewish Sabbath (which runs from sundown on Friday to sundown on Saturday—during which time he will play, but walk to and from the stadium, and not ride in a car, bus, or plane), and eats only kosher food.

The Diamondbacks and Steinmetz put in a lot of effort in order to accommodate his religion and baseball such as the ordering of kosher food.

== See also ==
- List of select Jewish baseball players
