= Steinmann =

Steinmann is a German occupational or toponymic surname meaning "stone man". Notable people with the surname include:

- Adelheid Steinmann (1866–1925), German politician, women's rights activist and wife of Gustav Steinmann
- Andrew Steinmann (born 1954), American theologist
- Danny Steinmann (1942–2012), American film director
- Gijs Steinmann (born 1961), Dutch footballer
- Gustav Steinmann (1856–1929), German geologist and paleontologist
- Heinz Steinmann (1938–2023), German footballer
- Horst Steinmann (born 1934), German economist and professor
- John Steinmann (1914–1987), American architect
- Roger Steinmann (born 1961), Swiss film- and theater-author/producer/director, entrepreneur
- Peter Steinmann (born 1962), Swiss modern pentathlete
- Rico Steinmann (born 1967), German footballer
- Urs Steinmann, Swiss slalom canoeist
- Ville Matti Steinmann (born 1995), German footballer
- Wulf Steinmann (1930–2019), German physicist

== See also ==
- Steinman
- Stoneman (surname)
- Steinmetz (disambiguation)
