= Norma Parker =

Australian social worker

Norma Alice Brown CBE
- Born: Norma Alice Parker; 1906; Perth, Western Australia
- Died: 2004 (aged 97–98)
- Occupation: social worker
- Known for: Catholic Welfare Bureau

Norma Alice Brown (née Parker) CBE (1906–2004) was an Australian social worker and educator. She is regarded as one of the founders of social work in Australia and established Catholic social work at St Vincent's Hospital, Melbourne in 1932 and St Vincent's Hospital, Sydney four years later.

== Life ==
She was born in Perth, Western Australia to Ernest and Annie Parker and graduated with a Bachelor of Arts from the University of Western Australia in 1924. "She became interested in social work training through Dr Ethel Stoneman, head of the university's course in psychology, who wanted social workers for her child guidance clinic, so she went, on a scholarship, to the Catholic University of America in Washington, where she specialised in psychiatric social work for her MA and Diploma of Social Service." In 1957 she married "Mont" Brown, a former soldier who had been a prisoner of war who worked on the Burma Railway. He died in 1964.

Along with Elvira Lyons, Constance Moffitt and Eileen Davidson, she helped found a "Catholic Welfare Bureau" (now known as Centacare) with branches in Melbourne (1935), Sydney (1941) and Adelaide (1942). Together, the four also "...established the Catholic Trained Social Workers' Association in 1940. Parker was president of the first state professional social workers' association from 1940 to 1943 and was instrumental in the foundation of the Australian Association of Social Workers (AASW), serving as its inaugural president from 1946 to 1954."

In May 1943, she opened the first social work department in an Australian mental hospital at Callan Park and was also the first psychiatric worker appointed by the Department of Public Health.

She was appointed the associate professor and head of the Department of Social Work at the University of New South Wales from 1966 to 1969. She was made Commander of the Order of the British Empire (Civil) on 3 June 1972, for "services to education and child welfare", and awarded an Honorary Doctor of Letters from Sydney University in 1986. The Norma Parker Correctional Centre for Women (part of the Parramatta Female Factory) is named after her.
