= Elliot Steinmetz =

American basketball coach (born 1980)

Yeshiva Maccabees
- Position: Head coach
- League: NCAA D-III

Personal information
- Born: 1980 (age 45–46)
- Coaching career: 2005–present

Career history

Coaching
- 2005–2010: Hebrew Academy of Nassau County
- 2014–present: Yeshiva

Career highlights
- 2× Skyline Coach of the Year (2017, 2020); 5× Skyline Tournament champion (2018, 2020, 2022, 2025, 2026)

Elliot Steinmetz (born 1980) is an American real estate lawyer and basketball coach who is currently the head coach of the Yeshiva University Maccabees, under the NCAA Division III bracket.

== Coaching career ==
He was employed as a coach for the Hebrew Academy of Nassau County from 2005 until he stepped down from the position in 2010.

On April 28, 2014, he was signed to become the next head coach of the Yeshiva University Maccabees.

From November 2019 until December 2021, his Maccabees won an astounding 50 consecutive victories, but despite that fact, he was quoted having said that: "Honestly, I don’t pay attention, Funny – I knew we have the streak, but we take it one game at time. We have a maturity, and a lot of our top guys are motivated, and that makes my job a lot easier."

In an interview, his philosophical vantage point, when narrowed down in a basketball stance, is not about winning rings, trophies or championships in a general sense, but to aid his team to get better everyday and try to represent the said university and the Jewish community in a positive note.

In 2023, Steinmetz was awarded the Jewish Sports Heritage Association's inaugural Marty Riger Outstanding Jewish Coach of the Year Award.

During the 2025–2026 season, Steinmetz led the Maccabees to a perfect 16-0 skyline conference record and a skyline tournament championship. In the NCAA division III tournament, the Maccabees defeated Bates 71-69 and University of Maine-Farmington 92–69 before losing to Emory 101–80 in the Sweet Sixteen.

== Legal career ==
Steinmetz was a partner at the Long Island-based law firm of Rosenberg & Steinmetz PC, a boutique real estate law firm with areas of practice focused on commercial real estate transactions and litigation.

== Personal life ==
Steinmetz is Jewish, and lives in Woodmere, New York. He completed his Juris Doctor (J.D.) degree at St. John's University School of Law in 2005.

His son Jacob Steinmetz is a professional baseball pitcher in the Arizona Diamondbacks organization. He was selected in the third round of the 2021 Major League Baseball draft by the Diamondbacks. He was the first practicing Orthodox Jewish player to be selected by a major league team. He played for Team Israel in the 2023 World Baseball Classic in Miami, Florida, in March 2023.

In 2024, Steinmetz facilitated the creation of a five-week educational segment on Holocaust studies for an MLB player who was interested in reconciliation following a past event. The player, Core Jackson, called Steinmetz minutes after being drafted to the New York Yankees, to thank Steinmetz for his help.

== Head coaching record ==
As of March 14, 2026

Team	Year	G	W	L	W–L%	Result
Yeshiva Maccabees	2014–15	25	14	11	.560	
Yeshiva Maccabees	2015–16	27	15	12	.556	
Yeshiva Maccabees	2016–17	25	15	10	.600	
Yeshiva Maccabees	2017–18	29	18	11	.621	Won Skyline Conference champion
Yeshiva Maccabees	2018–19	27	19	8	.704	
Yeshiva Maccabees	2019–20	30	29	1	.967	Won Skyline Conference champion
Yeshiva Maccabees	2020–21	7	7	0	1.000	Season suspended due to COVID-19 pandemic
Yeshiva Maccabees	2021–22	29	24	5	.828	Won Skyline Conference champion
Yeshiva Maccabees	2022–23	26	16	10	.615	
Yeshiva Maccabees	2023–24	28	16	12	.571	
Yeshiva Maccabees	2024–25	29	18	11	.621	Won Skyline Conference champion
Yeshiva Maccabees	2025–26	31	22	9	.710	Won Skyline Conference champion
Career		313	214	99	.684	
