= Breyvic Valera =

Venezuelan baseball player (born 1992)

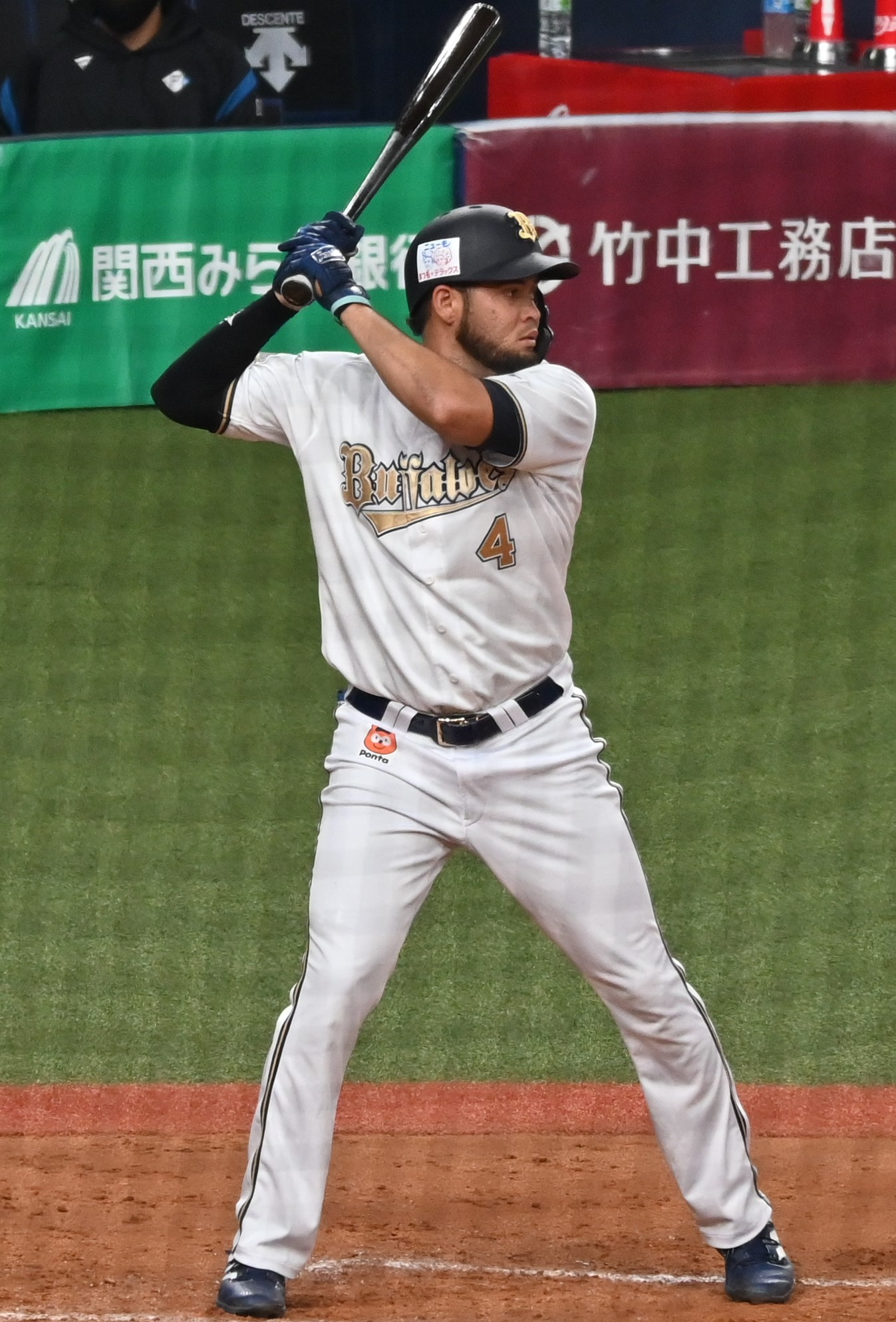
- Valera with the Orix Buffaloes in 2022

Leones de Yucatán – No. 22
- Second baseman
- Born: January 8, 1992 (age 34); Montalbán, Venezuela
- Bats: Switch Throws: Right

Professional debut
- MLB: September 5, 2017, for the St. Louis Cardinals
- NPB: March 29, 2022, for the Orix Buffaloes

MLB statistics (through 2021 season)
- Batting average: .236
- Home runs: 2
- Runs batted in: 29

NPB statistics (through 2022 season)
- Batting average: .205
- Home runs: 1
- Runs batted in: 6
- Stats at Baseball Reference

Teams
- St. Louis Cardinals (2017); Los Angeles Dodgers (2018); Baltimore Orioles (2018); New York Yankees (2019); Toronto Blue Jays (2019, 2021); Orix Buffaloes (2022)

Career highlights and awards
- Japan Series champion (2022)

Breyvic José Valera Henríquez (born January 8, 1992) is a Venezuelan professional baseball second baseman for the Leones de Yucatán of the Mexican League. He has previously played in Major League Baseball (MLB) for the St. Louis Cardinals, Los Angeles Dodgers, Baltimore Orioles, New York Yankees, and Toronto Blue Jays, and in Nippon Professional Baseball (NPB) for the Orix Buffaloes.

== Career ==
=== St. Louis Cardinals ===
Valera signed with the St. Louis Cardinals as an international free agent in May 2010. He made his professional debut with the Venezuelan Summer League Cardinals. He started 2014 with the Palm Beach Cardinals and was promoted to the Double-A Springfield Cardinals during the following season. Valera began 2016 with the Springfield Cardinals and was then promoted to the Memphis Redbirds, where he batted a combined .304 between both teams.

The Cardinals added Valera to their 40-man roster after the 2016 season.

On September 5, 2017 the St. Louis Cardinals recalled Valera from the Triple-A Memphis Redbirds, and he made his major league debut the same night against the San Diego Padres starting at second base, batting 7th in the lineup. His first MLB hit, a single, came on September 7, 2017, against the San Diego Padres.

Valera was designated for assignment on March 28, 2018.

=== Los Angeles Dodgers ===
On April 1, 2018, the Dodgers acquired Valera from the Cardinals in exchange for Johan Mieses. After beginning the season with the Triple-A Oklahoma City Dodgers, he was recalled to the majors on April 15.

=== Baltimore Orioles ===
The Dodgers traded Valera, along with Yusniel Diaz, Dean Kremer, Rylan Bannon, and Zach Pop, to the Baltimore Orioles for Manny Machado on July 18, 2018. Valera appeared in 12 games with the Orioles and went 10-for-35 with a triple and four runs batted in before fracturing his left index finger in a 6–3 win at Yankee Stadium on September 23. He was designated for assignment on January 4, 2019, when the Orioles claimed Austin Brice off waivers.

=== San Francisco Giants ===
The Orioles traded Valera to the San Francisco Giants in a cash transaction on January 5, 2019. Valera was designated for assignment on May 5, 2019, following the acquisition of Andrew Moore.

=== New York Yankees ===
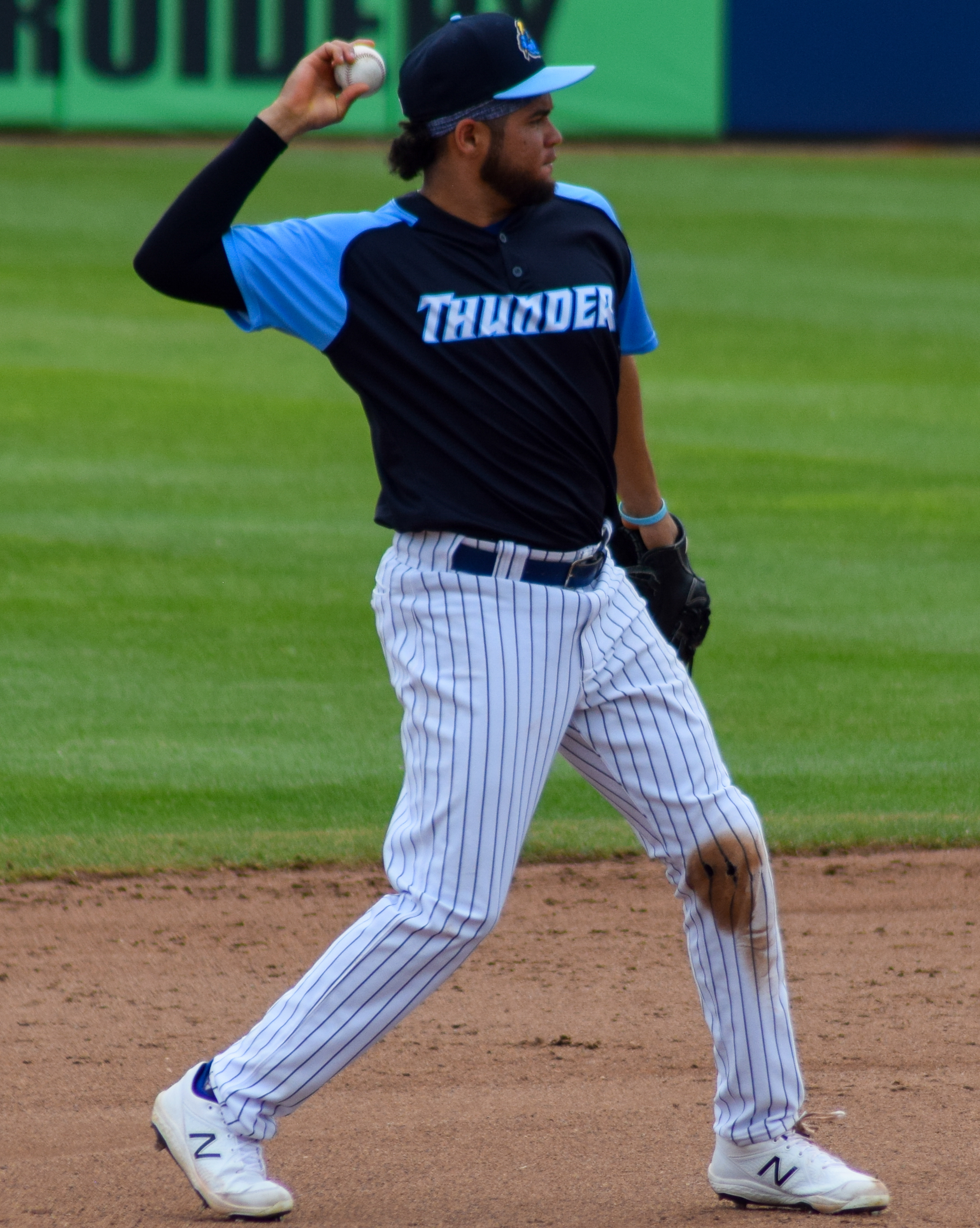
Valera with the Trenton Thunder

On May 12, 2019, the New York Yankees claimed Valera off of waivers. They assigned him to the Scranton/Wilkes-Barre RailRiders, and promoted him to the major leagues on July 7. On July 7, 2019, Valera made his Yankee debut and picked up a base hit in his first at-bat in a 2-1 loss to the Tampa Bay Rays. He played in 12 games for the Yankees going 7 for 32.

=== Toronto Blue Jays ===
On September 20, 2019, Valera was claimed off waivers by the Toronto Blue Jays. In his fifth game with the Blue Jays, on September 29, Valera hit his first career Major League home run off of Yonny Chirinos in an 8-3 victory over the Tampa Bay Rays at Rogers Centre in Toronto. Valera was designated for assignment on February 8, 2020.

On February 12, 2020, he was claimed off of waivers by the San Diego Padres from the Blue Jays. On July 2, he was re-claimed off waivers by Blue Jays from the Padres. On July 21, 2020, the Blue Jays placed Valera on the restricted list, when he had difficulty leaving his native Venezuela. On February 28, 2021, Valera was activated off of the restricted list. On April 1, 2021, Valera was designated for assignment by Toronto. On April 4, Valera was outrighted to the alternate training site. He was assigned to the Triple-A Buffalo Bisons to begin the year. On July 18, Valera was selected to the active roster. Valera played in 39 games for the Blue Jays, hitting .253 with one home run and 15 RBIs. On December 1, Valera was released by the Blue Jays.

=== Orix Buffaloes ===
On December 17, 2021, Valera signed with the Orix Buffaloes of Nippon Professional Baseball. In 37 games for Orix in 2022, he batted .205/.294/.277 with one home run and six RBI. Valera became a free agent after the 2022 season.

=== Toros de Tijuana ===
On November 6, 2023, Valera signed with the Toros de Tijuana of the Mexican League. In 18 games for the Toros, Valera hit .194/.297/.258 with two RBI and one stolen base.

On June 12, 2024, Valera was traded to the Pericos de Puebla of the Mexican League. However he was released the following day without appearing in a game.

=== El Águila de Veracruz ===
On January 21, 2025, Valera signed with El Águila de Veracruz of the Mexican League. In 75 appearances for Veracruz, he hit .283/.377/.399 with four home runs, 36 RBI, and six stolen bases. Valera became a free agent following the season.

=== Guerreros de Lara ===
On March 4, 2026 Valera signed with the Guerreros de Lara of the Venezuelan Major League. In 41 games for the team, he batted .352/.429/.465 with two home runs and 35 RBI.

=== Leones de Yucatán ===
On June 10, 2026, Valera signed with the Leones de Yucatán of the Mexican League.
