= Zach Pop =

Canadian baseball player (born 1996)

Free agent
- Pitcher
- Born: September 20, 1996 (age 30); Brampton, Ontario, Canada
- Bats: Right Throws: Right

MLB debut
- April 3, 2021, for the Miami Marlins

MLB statistics (through 2026 season)
- Win–loss record: 8–6
- Earned run average: 4.83
- Strikeouts: 132
- Stats at Baseball Reference

Teams
- Miami Marlins (2021–2022); Toronto Blue Jays (2022–2024); Seattle Mariners (2025); New York Mets (2025); Philadelphia Phillies (2026)

Zachery Michael Pop (born September 20, 1996) is a Canadian professional baseball pitcher who is a free agent. He has previously played in Major League Baseball (MLB) for the Miami Marlins, Toronto Blue Jays, Seattle Mariners, New York Mets, and Philadelphia Phillies.

== Career ==
=== Amateur ===
Pop attended Notre Dame Catholic Secondary School in Brampton, Ontario. He was drafted by the Toronto Blue Jays in the 23rd round of the 2014 Major League Baseball draft, but did not sign and played college baseball at the University of Kentucky. In 2015, he played collegiate summer baseball for the St. Cloud Rox of the Northwoods League. In 2016, he returned to summer ball with the Wareham Gatemen of the Cape Cod Baseball League.

=== Los Angeles Dodgers ===
Pop was drafted by the Los Angeles Dodgers in the seventh round, with the 220th overall selection, of the 2017 Major League Baseball draft. He signed and made his professional debut with the rookie-level Arizona League Dodgers, pitching five scoreless innings. In 2018, Pop began the year with the Single-A Great Lakes Loons before being promoted to the High-A Rancho Cucamonga Quakes.

=== Baltimore Orioles ===
On July 18, 2018, Pop was traded to the Baltimore Orioles along with Breyvic Valera, Dean Kremer, Yusniel Diaz, and Rylan Bannon in exchange for Manny Machado. He was assigned to the Double-A Bowie Baysox and finished the season there. In 44 relief appearances between Great Lakes, Rancho Cucamonga, and Bowie, Pop compiled a 2–3 record with a 1.53 ERA and 64 strikeouts. He returned to Bowie to begin 2019, and went 1–0 with a 0.84 ERA and 11 strikeouts in 10 2/3 innings. On May 14, 2019, Pop underwent Tommy John surgery, and missed the remainder of the season. Pop did not play in a game in 2020 due to the cancellation of the minor league season because of the COVID-19 pandemic.

=== Miami Marlins ===
On December 10, 2020, Pop was selected by the Arizona Diamondbacks in the Rule 5 draft. Shortly after, Pop was traded to the Miami Marlins in exchange for Tyler Jones. Pop made the Marlins' Opening Day roster. On April 3, 2021, Pop made his MLB debut, pitching a scoreless inning of relief against the Tampa Bay Rays. He made 50 appearances for the Marlins during his rookie campaign, posting a 1-0 record and 4.12 ERA with 51 strikeouts across 54 2/3 innings pitched.

Pop pitched in 18 games for Miami during the 2022 season, registering as 2-0 record and 3.60 ERA with 14 strikeouts over 20 innings of work.

=== Toronto Blue Jays ===
On August 2, 2022, the Marlins traded Pop, Anthony Bass, and a player to be named later (named Edward Duran on August 31) to the Toronto Blue Jays in exchange for prospect Jordan Groshans. He made 17 relief outings for Toronto down the stretch, posting a 2-0 record and 1.89 ERA with 11 strikeouts over 19 innings of work.

Pop made the Blue Jays' Opening Day roster in 2023. In 15 games for Toronto, he struggled to a 6.59 ERA with 14 strikeouts across 13 2/3 innings pitched.

Pop was optioned to the Triple–A Buffalo Bisons to begin the 2024 season. He made 58 appearances out of the bullpen for the Blue Jays during the campaign, compiling a 2-4 record and 5.59 ERA with 33 strikeouts and one save across 48 1/3 innings pitched.

Pop was designated for assignment by the Blue Jays on March 27, 2025. He was released by the Blue Jays organization on April 2.

=== Seattle Mariners ===
On April 16, 2025, Pop signed a minor league contract with the Seattle Mariners. In 11 appearances for the rookie-level Arizona Complex League Mariners and Triple-A Tacoma Rainiers, he compiled a 2-1 record and 2.79 ERA with nine strikeouts and one save across 9 2/3 innings pitched. On June 13, the Mariners selected Pop's contract, adding him to their active roster. In four appearances for Seattle, he struggled to a 13.50 ERA with three strikeouts over 5 1/3 innings pitched. Pop was designated for assignment following the promotion of Juan Burgos on June 28. He elected free agency after clearing waivers on July 2.

=== New York Mets ===
On July 5, 2025, Pop signed a one-year, major league contract with the New York Mets. In his first pitching appearance as a Met, Pop allowed three runs in 1 1/3 innings against the New York Yankees in a 6–4 loss on July 6. He was designated for assignment by the Mets following the promotion of Alex Carrillo on July 8. Pop elected free agency after clearing waivers on July 10.

=== Chicago Cubs ===
On July 22, 2025, Pop signed a minor league contract with the Chicago Cubs. He made nine appearances for the Triple-A Iowa Cubs, posting a 1-0 record and 5.59 ERA with 14 strikeouts across 9 2/3 innings pitched. Pop elected free agency following the season on November 6.

=== Philadelphia Phillies ===
On December 22, 2025, Pop signed a major league contract with the Philadelphia Phillies. He appeared in seven games for the Phillies during the 2026 season and had a 3.68 ERA with six strikeouts. Pop was placed on the injured list on April 13, 2026, with a right calf strain. He was activated from the injured list and then subsequently designated for assignment on May 30. Pop cleared waivers and elected free agency on June 6, rather than accepting an outright assignment to the Triple-A Lehigh Valley IronPigs.

=== Miami Marlins (second stint) ===
On June 12, 2026, Pop signed a minor league contract with the Miami Marlins. In 26 games with Triple-A Jacksonville Jumbo Shrimp he threw 25 innings of relief going 3-3 with a 3.60 ERA with 19 strikeouts and 5 saves. He elected free agency on November 2.

== See also ==
- Rule 5 draft results
