= Dan Lozano =

American sports agent (born 1967)

- Born: Daniel Martin Lozano; March 3, 1967 (age 59)
- Occupation: Sports Agent
- Years active: 23
- Employer: MVP Sports Group
- Website: www.mvpsportsgroup.com

Daniel Martin Lozano (born March 3, 1967) is a professional sports agent from Dixon, California, specializing in baseball. He is the founder of MVP Sports Group, a sports agency based in Los Angeles, CA. His current clients include many notable MLB players such as Albert Pujols, Joey Votto, Alex Rodriguez, Jimmy Rollins, Carlos Beltrán, Manny Machado, Fernando Tatis, Jr., Nick Swisher, Michael Young, Brian Wilson and Mike Piazza. He has worked professionally as an agent for over 23 years, and has negotiated numerous deals including some of the largest deals in baseball history such as Mike Piazza's 7-year $91 million deal with the New York Mets, Albert Pujols’ $240 million deal with the Los Angeles Angels of Anaheim, Joey Votto's $225 million extension with the Cincinnati Reds, and both Manny Machado's 10-year $300 million deal and Fernando Tatis, Jr.'s 14-year $340 million extension with the San Diego Padres.

== Early career ==
Lozano began working as an intern for Beverly Hills Sports Council in 1989, and was made a partner at the firm in 1996 where he remained until his departure in May 2010. During his tenure at the firm, Lozano represented many of the highest profile players in baseball, and negotiated several record setting contracts. In 1998, Lozano negotiated what at the time was the largest contract ever awarded in MLB, Mike Piazza's 7-year $91 million contract with the New York Mets. Ultimately valued at over $93 million with incentives earned, it remains the third largest contract ever awarded to a catcher. In 2000, Lozano negotiated an extension for Pittsburgh Pirates catcher Jason Kendall worth more than $60 million over 5 years. In 2004, he negotiated an 8-year $112 million deal for first-time arbitration eligible Albert Pujols with the St. Louis Cardinals. It was the largest contract in Cardinals’ history, and it remains the largest contract ever for a first time arbitration eligible player. (Mike Trout's six-year $144.5mm contract signed in 2014 has since surpassed this contract in value.) Lozano also negotiated a number of other multimillion-dollar contracts or extensions, including for Philadelphia Phillies shortstop Jimmy Rollins (6 years $48.5 million) and Texas Rangers infielder Michael Young (6 years $81 million).

Lozano's success has earned him numerous accolades in the sports business community. He has twice been named to the prestigious “Forty Under 40” list created annually by Street & Smith's Sports Business Journal, first in 2002 then again in 2005. He is routinely referenced as one of the top agents in sports.

== MVP Sports Group ==
In May, 2010, it was widely reported that Lozano had left Beverly Hills Sports Council in favor of starting a new company, and that many of his clients would elect to remain with his representation. Shortly thereafter, Lozano founded MVP Sports Group (formerly ICON Sports Group) where he has continued to represent many of his clients including Albert Pujols, Joey Votto, Jimmy Rollins, Michael Young and others. Since his departure, a number of other players have also signed with Lozano and MVP including Alex Rodriguez, Nick Swisher, Brian Wilson, Kurt Suzuki, Manny Machado, Carlos Beltrán, Jonny Gomes, Fernando Tatis, Jr., Mike Gonzalez and Eric Young, Jr.

== 2011 Offseason ==
The 2011 MLB offseason was highlighted by the free-agency of St. Louis Cardinals first baseman Albert Pujols after spending his first 11 seasons with the Cardinals. After an extended bidding process involving multiple teams, Pujols ended up signing a 10-year, $240 million contract with the Los Angeles Angels of Anaheim. The deal made Pujols just the second player in professional sports history to sign a contract whose total value exceeded $200 million. Pujols’ contract contains numerous incentives and milestone bonuses, as well as a lucrative personal services agreement that would begin after Pujols retires that could push the total value of the deal above $260 million. Lozano also negotiated several other multi-year contracts in 2011, including Carlos Beltran's $26 million deal with the Cardinals, and Jimmy Rollins’ $33 million deal with the Phillies. Lozano also negotiated a massive 10 year, $225 million extension for Cincinnati Reds first baseman Joey Votto on the eve of the start to the 2012 regular season. Including the 2 years remaining on his previous deal, the total value of the contract is reported to be 12 years and $251.5 million (plus a team option for the 2024 season). It's the largest contract ever awarded to a National League player and the longest guaranteed contract in major league history. The deal shocked many in the industry, not only for the length and total dollars spent by the Reds, but also because Votto was still under contract and two years away from free agency. In total, Lozano was responsible for negotiating more than half a billion dollars in contracts, a record for any individual agent or agency in one offseason.

=== November 2011 ===
Lozano was the subject of an unflattering exposé in an article published on Deadspin.com in November 2011. The article, based on an anonymously sent packet received by Deadspin that quotes unidentified and anonymous sources, alleges various improprieties. A previously published USA Today article covering the same issues addressed the possible source of the allegations, noting Lozano's impressive client roster (including the many players who had left other firms to hire him) and his recent departure from a firm as possible motivations for attack.
