= Yusniel Díaz =

Cuban baseball player (born 1996)

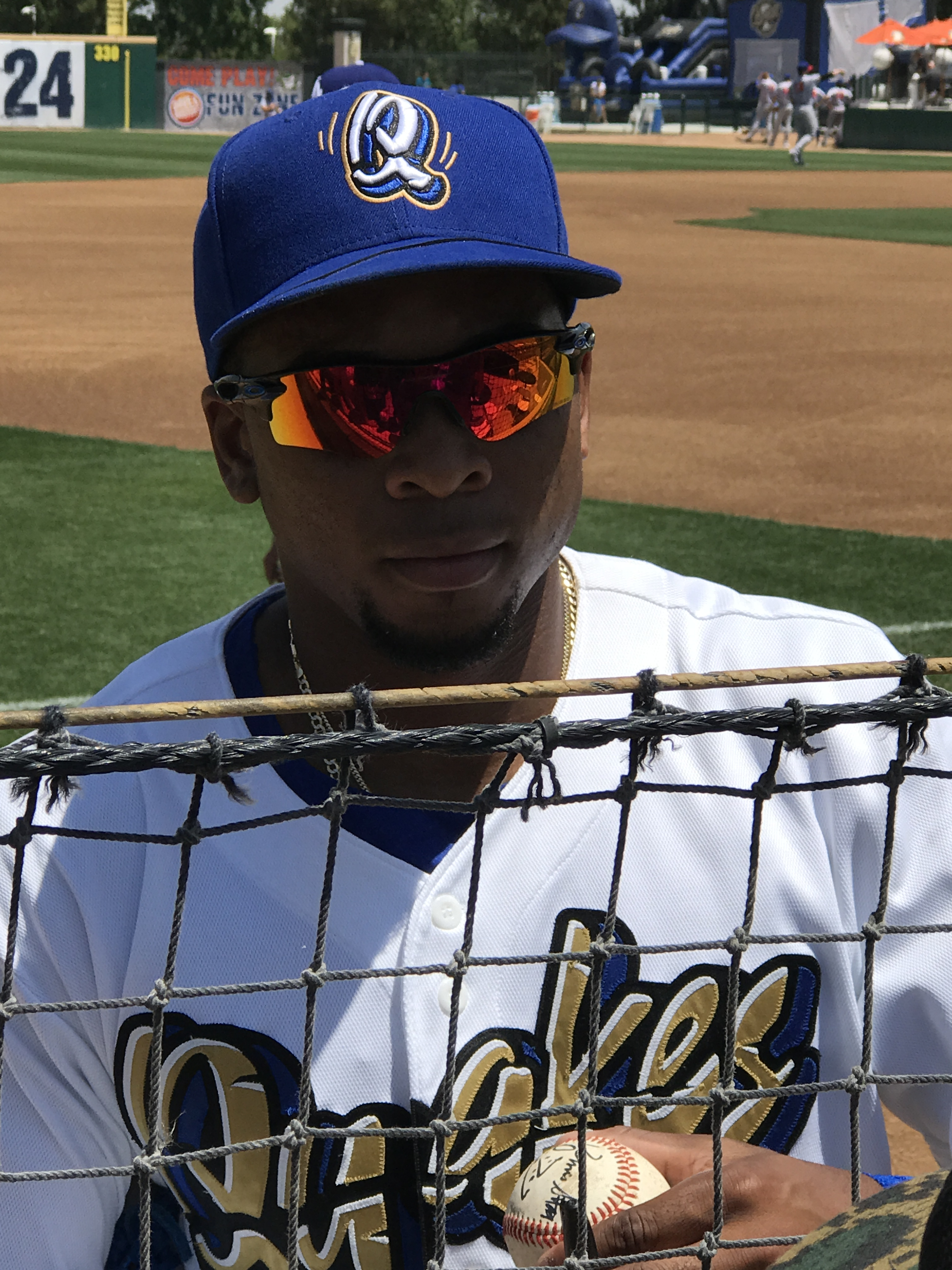
- Díaz with the Rancho Cucamonga Quakes

Free agent
- Outfielder
- Born: October 7, 1996 (age 29); Havana, Cuba
- Bats: Right Throws: Right

MLB debut
- August 2, 2022, for the Baltimore Orioles

MLB statistics (through 2022 season)
- Batting average: .000
- Home runs: 0
- Runs batted in: 0
- Stats at Baseball Reference

Teams
- Baltimore Orioles (2022)

Yusniel Efraín Díaz Hechavarría (born October 7, 1996) is a Cuban professional baseball outfielder who is a free agent. He has previously played in Major League Baseball (MLB) for the Baltimore Orioles.

== Career ==
=== Industriales ===
Díaz played for the Industriales of the Cuban National Series and hit .348/.448/.440 over 65 games as a rookie. He was the favorite to win the Cuban National Series Rookie of the Year Award, but defected before the award was given out.

=== Los Angeles Dodgers ===
Díaz signed with the Los Angeles Dodgers in November 2015. The Dodgers assigned him to the Rancho Cucamonga Quakes of the Advanced Class-A California League to begin his professional career. In 82 games for the Quakes in 2016, he hit .267 with eight homers and 54 RBI. In 2017, he played in 83 games for the Quakes and 31 for the Double-A Tulsa Drillers and hit .292 with 11 homers and 52 RBI. He was assigned to play in the Arizona Fall League and was chosen for the Fall Stars Game showcase. Díaz remained with Tulsa to begin 2018 and was selected to the "world" team at the All-Star Futures Game.

=== Baltimore Orioles ===
On July 18, 2018, Díaz was traded to the Baltimore Orioles along with Breyvic Valera, Dean Kremer, Rylan Bannon, and Zach Pop in exchange for Manny Machado. He was assigned to the Bowie Baysox and finished the year there. In 97 games between Tulsa and Bowie, he slashed .285/.392/.449 with 11 home runs and 45 RBI. He split the 2019 season between the Aberdeen IronBirds, Frederick Keys, and Bowie, hitting a combined .265/.341/.464 with 11 home runs and 55 RBI. Díaz did not play in a game in 2020 due to the cancellation of the minor league season because of the COVID-19 pandemic.

On November 20, 2020, the Orioles added Díaz to their 40-man roster to protect him from the Rule 5 draft. Díaz split the 2021 season between Bowie and the Triple-A Norfolk Tides. In 65 games between the two affiliates, he batted .161/.233/.265 with five home runs and 22 RBI.

He spent the majority of the 2022 season with Norfolk, slashing .251/.346/.360 with six home runs, 34 RBI, and nine stolen bases in 70 games. On August 1, 2022, Díaz was recalled and promoted to the major leagues for the first time. He made his MLB debut the next day, receiving one plate appearance and striking out against the Texas Rangers’ Dennis Santana. He was sent down to Norfolk to the following day. He was recalled on August 21, but sent down the next day without making an appearance.

On November 10, 2022, Díaz was removed from the 40-man roster and sent outright to Norfolk. He elected free agency the same day.

=== Los Angeles Dodgers (second stint) ===
On February 3, 2023, Díaz signed a minor league contract with the Los Angeles Dodgers organization. He spent the season with the Double–A Tulsa Drillers, playing in 94 games and batting .278/.374/.484 with 16 home runs and 60 RBI. Díaz elected free agency following the season on November 6.

=== San Francisco Giants ===
On November 21, 2023, Díaz signed a minor league contract with the San Francisco Giants. He played in 20 games for the Triple-A Sacramento River Cats, slashing .177/.358/.373 with three home runs, five RBI, and four stolen bases. Díaz elected free agency following the season on November 4, 2024.

=== Lincoln Saltdogs ===
On January 16, 2025, Díaz signed with the Lincoln Saltdogs of the American Association of Professional Baseball. In 53 appearances for Lincoln, Díaz batted .253/.330/.429 with nine home runs and 44 RBI. He became a free agent following the season.

=== Conspiradores de Querétaro ===
On April 18, 2026, Díaz signed with the Conspiradores de Querétaro of the Mexican League. He made four appearances for the Conspiradores, going 3-for-12 (.250). Díaz was released by Querétaro on April 30.

=== Algodoneros de Unión Laguna ===
On May 2, 2026, Díaz signed with the Algodoneros de Unión Laguna of the Mexican League. In 16 appearances for the Algodoneros, he batted .354/.394/.477 with one home run and 15 RBI. On May 31, 2026, Díaz was waived by Laguna.

=== Leones de Yucatán ===
On May 31, 2026, Díaz was claimed off waivers by the Leones de Yucatán of the Mexican League. In eight games for the Leones, he batted .182/.333/.227 with no home runs and one RBI. On June 24, Díaz was released by Yucatán.
