= Rylan Bannon =

American baseball player (born 1996)

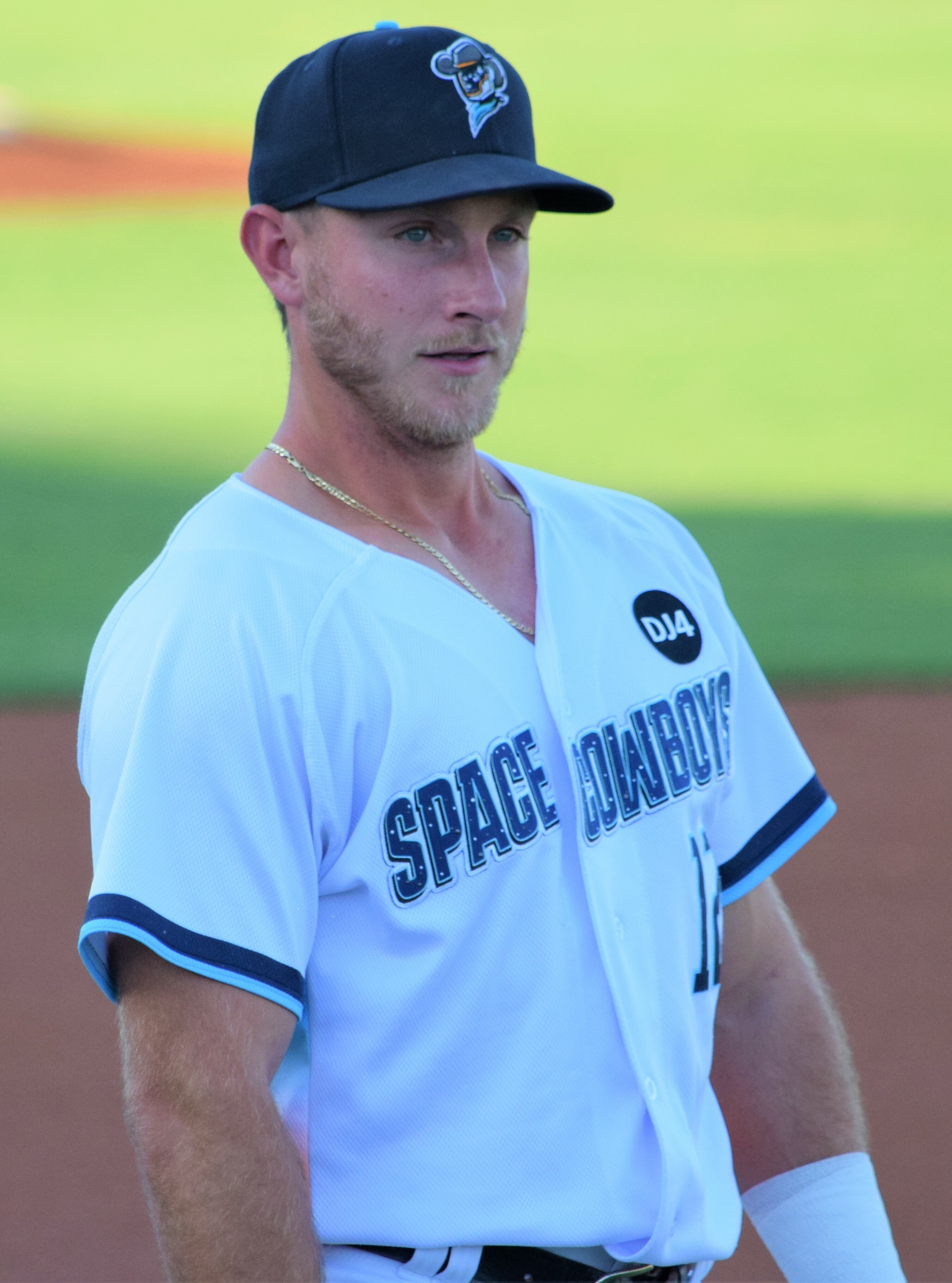
- Bannon with the Sugar Land Space Cowboys in 2023
- Third baseman
- Born: April 22, 1996 (age 30); Joliet, Illinois, U.S.
- Batted: Right Threw: Right

MLB debut
- May 12, 2022, for the Baltimore Orioles

Last MLB appearance
- April 30, 2023, for the Houston Astros

MLB statistics
- Batting average: .100
- Home runs: 0
- Runs batted in: 0
- Stats at Baseball Reference

Teams
- Baltimore Orioles (2022); Atlanta Braves (2022); Houston Astros (2023)

Rylan Thomas Bannon (born April 22, 1996) is an American former professional baseball third baseman. He played in Major League Baseball (MLB) for the Baltimore Orioles, Atlanta Braves, and Houston Astros.

== Amateur career ==
Bannon graduated from Joliet Catholic Academy and played college baseball at Xavier University. In 2017, he was the Big East Conference Baseball Player of the Year. During the summer of 2016 he played for the Savannah Bananas of the Coastal Plain League.

== Professional career ==
=== Los Angeles Dodgers ===
Bannon was drafted by the Los Angeles Dodgers in the eighth round of the 2017 Major League Baseball draft. He signed and made his professional debut with the Ogden Raptors, batting .336/.425/.591 with ten home runs and 30 RBIs in 40 games. He began 2018 with the Rancho Cucamonga Quakes, where he hit .296 in 89 games with 20 homers and 61 RBIs and was eventually honored with the California League Most Valuable Player Award.

=== Baltimore Orioles ===
On July 18, 2018, Bannon was traded to the Baltimore Orioles along with Breyvic Valera, Dean Kremer, Yusniel Díaz, and Zach Pop in exchange for Manny Machado. He was assigned to the Bowie Baysox and finished the season there, batting .204 with two home runs and 11 RBIs in 32 games. He split the 2019 season between Bowie and the Norfolk Tides, hitting a combined .266 with 11 home runs and 59 RBI. He was selected to play in the Arizona Fall League for the Surprise Saguaros following the 2019 season. Bannon did not play in a game in 2020 due to the cancellation of the minor league season because of the COVID-19 pandemic.

On November 20, 2020, Bannon was added to the 40-man roster. Bannon spent the majority of the 2021 season in Triple-A Norfolk, but struggled to a .177/.297/.370 batting line with 15 home runs, 36 RBI, and 9 stolen bases.

On May 12, 2022, Bannon was recalled from Norfolk and promoted to the major leagues for the first time. Bannon made his MLB debut the same day against the St. Louis Cardinals, and recorded his first hit in his first at-bat off of Steven Matz. It was one of two hits he had for the Orioles, in 14 at-bats over four games.

=== Atlanta Braves ===
On August 8, 2022, Bannon was claimed off waivers by the Dodgers, However they designated for assignment just four days later without him appearing in any games in the Dodgers system.

On August 16, 2022, Bannon was claimed off waivers by the Atlanta Braves. He was designated for assignment on November 11.

=== Houston Astros ===
On November 18, 2022, Bannon was claimed off waivers by the Chicago Cubs. However, on December 2, he was claimed off waivers again, this time by the Houston Astros. Bannon was optioned to the Triple-A Sugar Land Space Cowboys to begin the 2023 season. On April 18, 2023, Bannon was recalled by the Astros after OF Chas McCormick was placed the 10-day injured list. In 2 games with the Astros, Bannon went 0–6 with 3 strikeouts. On May 8, Bannon was optioned to Triple-A Sugar Land after McCormick was activated from the injured list. In 81 games for Sugar Land, he batted .230 with 15 home runs and 43 RBI. On September 3, Bannon was designated for assignment following the waiver claim of Bennett Sousa. He cleared waivers and was sent outright to Triple–A Sugar Land on September 5. Bannon elected free agency following the season on November 6.

=== New York Mets ===
On December 11, 2023, Bannon signed a minor league contract with the New York Mets. In 79 games for the Triple–A Syracuse Mets, Bannon batted .254/.392/.475 with 15 home runs, 57 RBI, and seven stolen bases.

=== Minnesota Twins ===
On July 15, 2024, Bannon was traded to the Minnesota Twins in exchange for cash considerations. In 49 appearances for the Triple-A St. Paul Saints, he hit .165/.330/.285 with three home runs, 20 RBI, and four stolen bases. Bannon elected free agency following the season on November 4.
