= Ethel Stoneman =

Australian psychologist (1890–1973)

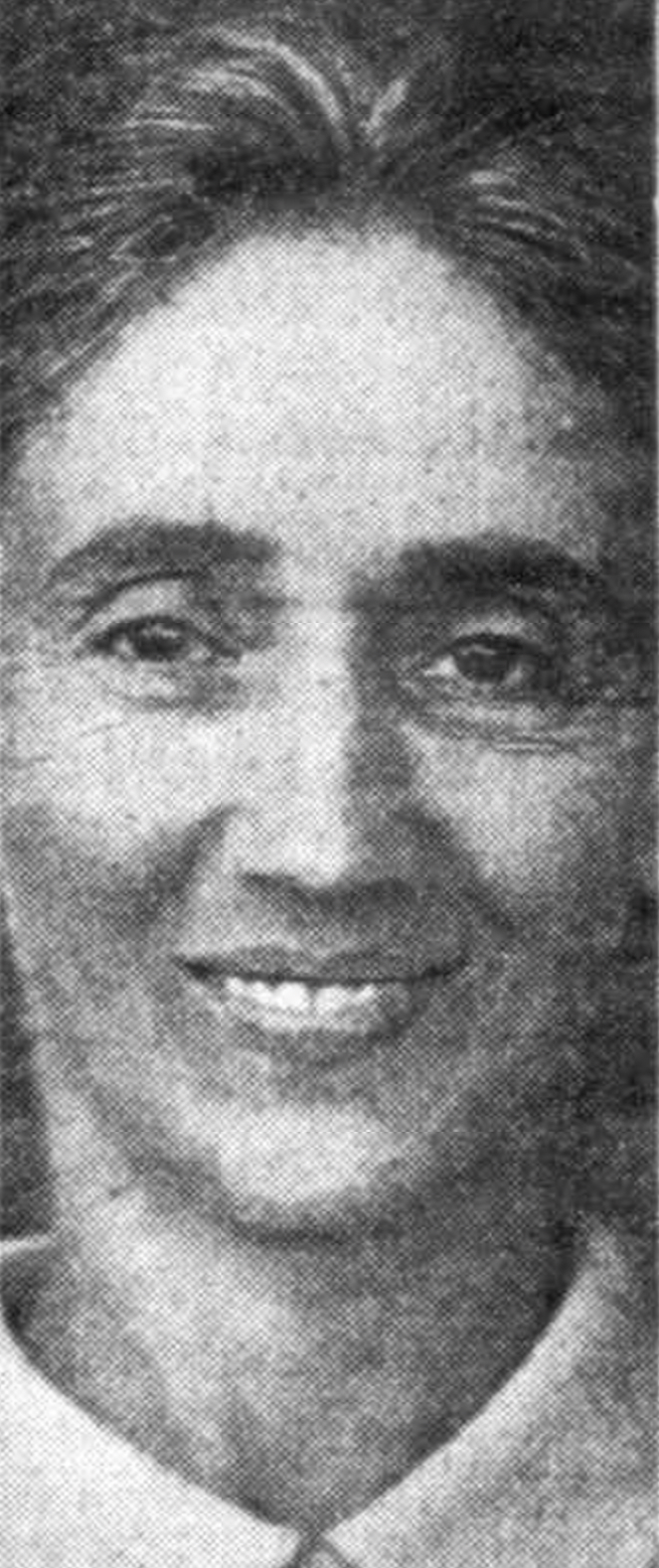
- Stoneman in 1930
- Born: Ethel Turner Stoneman; 10 August 1890; Perth, Western Australia
- Died: 5 July 1973 (aged 82); Diamond Creek, Victoria, Australia
- Other name: Effie Stoneman
- Education: University of Western Australia

Ethel Turner Stoneman (10 August 1890 – 5 July 1973) was an Australian psychologist. She was the first person to graduate with a Master of Arts (Psychology) from the University of Western Australia and the first State Psychologist appointed in that State.

== Early life and education ==
Ethel Turner Stoneman was born in Perth, Western Australia on 10 August 1890. Her parents were Minnie Caroline (née Farmer) and coffee importer Charles Edgar Stoneman. Her mother died a year later and she and her sister Ivy were brought up by Lydia Farmer, their maternal grandmother.

Stoneman studied at the Teacher's Training College in Perth in 1909. The following year she and Ivy were elected members of the Natural History and Science Society of Western Australia. In 1913 she began study at the University of Western Australia, graduating in 1916 with a BA (hons) and in 1919 was the first person to graduate with a MA (psychology) there. Her MA thesis was titled "Studies of Personality". In 1916 she attended Stanford University in California where she learnt about intelligence testing and abnormal psychology.

== Career ==
Having returned to Perth in 1919, she was appointed lecturer at the Teacher's Training College. In 1921 Stoneman, as senior lecturer at the College, gave evidence at the WA Education Commission into mental defectives, recommending that a clinic be established to work with juveniles facing the Children's Court to determine their mental abilities.

Stoneman went to Britain and Europe in 1924, including at the University of London, where her work involved assessing the emotions of patients of the Bethlem Royal Hospital.

She was appointed to the State Psychological Clinic in Perth when it was established in 1926 and remained its director until it was abolished in 1930, following a change of government. Her work included the assessment of the intelligence of children and assigning them to suitable apprenticeship and jobs.

She also lectured at the University of Western Australia, where her teaching encouraged Norma Parker, who later became a pioneer social worker.

Next, Stoneman went to Scotland where, in 1933, she graduated from the University of Edinburgh with a PhD. In 1935 she published her PhD thesis into attempted suicide, Halfway to the hereafter. After a year back in Perth, she moved to Melbourne to work as a consulting psychologist.

Stoneman died in hospital in Diamond Creek, Victoria on 5 July 1973.
