= David Steinmetz =

David Steinmetz may refer to:

- David Steinmetz (historian) (1936–2015), American historian
- David Steinmetz (American football) (born 1995), American football offensive tackle
