= Dean Kremer =

Israeli–American baseball player (born 1996)

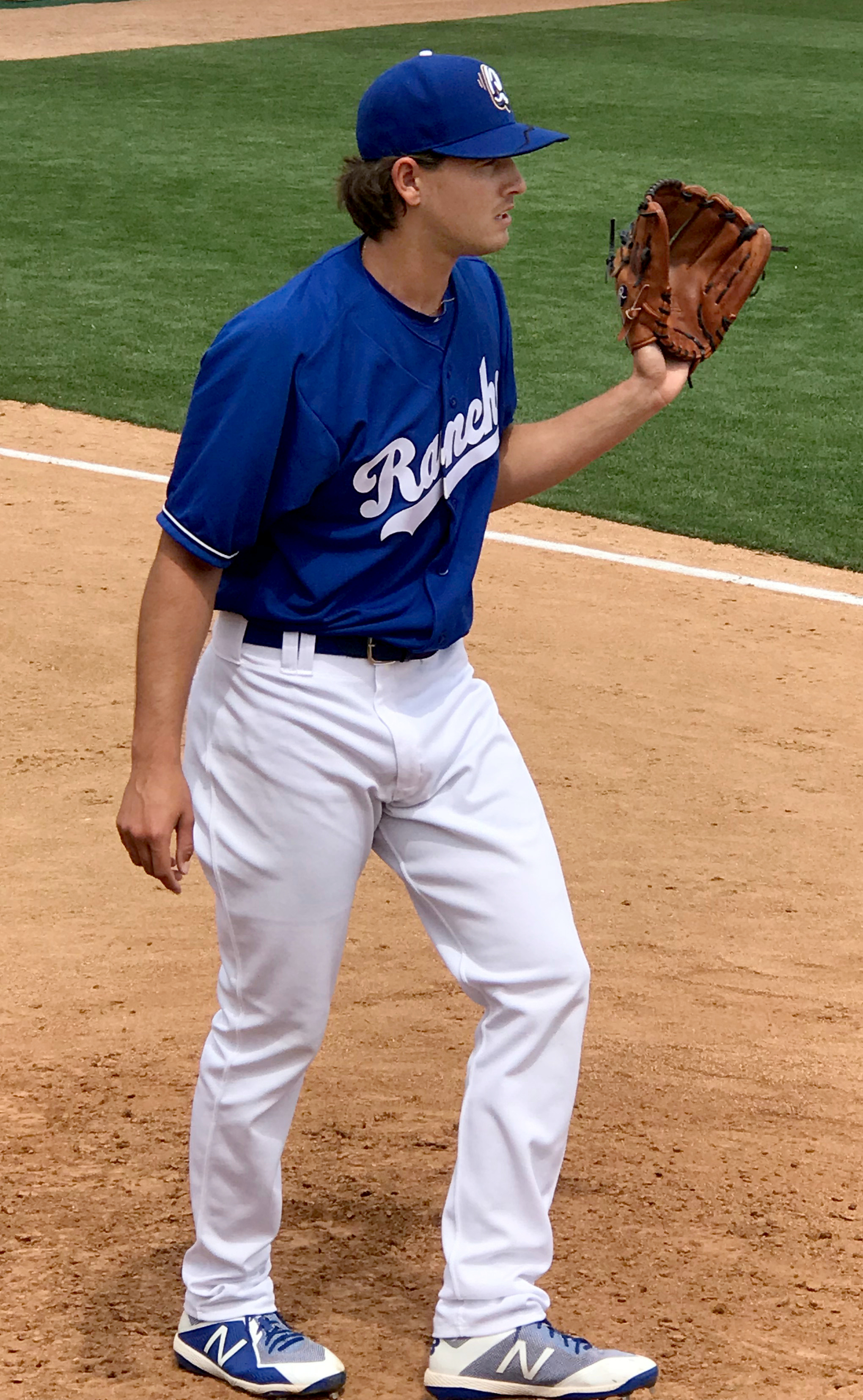
- Kremer with the Rancho Cucamonga Quakes in 2018

Minnesota Twins – No. 13
- Pitcher
- Born: January 7, 1996 (age 30); Stockton, California, U.S.
- Bats: Right Throws: Right

MLB debut
- September 6, 2020, for the Baltimore Orioles

MLB statistics (through 2026 season)
- Win–loss record: 46–45
- Earned run average: 4.31
- Strikeouts: 664
- Stats at Baseball Reference

Teams
- Baltimore Orioles (2020–2026); Minnesota Twins (2026–present)
Medals
Men's baseball
Representing United States
Maccabiah Games
Gold medal – first place	2013 Israel	National team

Dean Junior Kremer (Hebrew: דין קרמר; born January 7, 1996) is an Israeli–American professional baseball pitcher for the Minnesota Twins of Major League Baseball (MLB). He has previously played in MLB for the Baltimore Orioles. In 2015, he became the first Israeli drafted by an MLB team. He made his MLB debut in 2020.

In international competition, Kremer pitched for the Team USA baseball team in the 2013 Maccabiah Games in Israel, winning a gold medal. The following two years he pitched for Israel in the qualifying for the European Baseball Championship, and won the Most Valuable Pitcher award in both 2014 and 2015. He also pitched in September 2016 in the qualifier for Israel at the 2017 World Baseball Classic.

Kremer pitched for San Joaquin Delta College in his freshman year in 2014, and was named a Third Team All-American. He was drafted by the San Diego Padres in the 38th round of the 2015 Major League Baseball draft, becoming the first Israeli to ever be selected in the MLB draft, but chose not to sign. He was drafted again, this time by the Los Angeles Dodgers in the 14th round of the 2016 Major League Baseball draft, and did sign. He threw a fastball in the 92–95-mile-per-hour (148–153 km/h) range that sometimes reached 97 miles per hour (156 km/h), a slider, a curveball, and a splitter. He pitched for Team Israel at the 2017 World Baseball Classic. The Dodgers traded him to the Orioles at the 2018 trade deadline. In 2018, Kremer led all minor league pitchers in strikeouts. He made his MLB debut in September 2020, becoming the first Israeli citizen to pitch in the major leagues. Kremer pitched for Team Israel in the 2023 World Baseball Classic in Miami and again in 2026.

== Early life ==
Kremer was born and raised in Stockton, California, and is Jewish. He had his bar mitzvah in Israel. Discussing the decision by Jewish Los Angeles Dodgers pitcher Sandy Koufax to not pitch Game 1 of the 1965 World Series because the game fell on Yom Kippur, Kremer said: "I would do the same."

Kremer lives in Israel for two months of every year, and has dual Israeli-American citizenship. His parents Adi and Sigal Kremer are Israeli, and after they completed their service in the Israel Defense Forces they came together to the United States. His father played college tennis at the University of the Pacific, which he attended on a tennis scholarship. Kremer is fluent in Hebrew and the family speaks Hebrew at home.

He has two younger brothers, Ron (who is in the Israeli Army) and Niv. Kremer's grandparents live in Israel, in Tel Aviv and in Rishon LeZion, and all of his extended family other than his parents and youngest brother live in Israel. His great-uncle is American-Israeli businessman and philanthropist Haim Saban.

== Amateur career ==
Kremer started playing baseball in Little League at the age of five.

Kremer attended Lincoln High School in Stockton, California, and graduated in 2013. There, he played baseball for two seasons as a right fielder and pitcher, and was twice named Second Team All-League. As a senior, on the mound for a significant amount for the first time, he was 6–2 with a 2.35 ERA, and 37 strikeouts in 41.2 innings.

In 2013–14, Kremer attended San Joaquin Delta College for his freshman year of college as a Business major, playing for the Mustangs, and becoming a full-time pitcher. He also followed the college's weight and conditioning program, and the formerly skinny pitcher gained approximately 20 pounds (9.1 kg), bringing him to 35 pounds (16 kg) over his 140 pounds (64 kg) weight when he graduated high school. Kremer was 13–1 with a 2.00 ERA in 112.2 innings pitched, with 90 strikeouts. He was named the California Community College Baseball Coaches Association's Pitcher of the Week for the week ending April 5, 2015, and a 2015 Third Team All-American.

Kremer transferred for 2014–15 to the University of Las Vegas (UNLV) on a baseball scholarship for his sophomore year. He was a starting pitcher for the Rebels and went 4–5 with a 4.92 ERA. At the time, he threw a fastball in the low-90s.

== Professional career ==
In June 2015, at 19 years of age, Kremer became the first Israeli to ever be selected in the Major League Baseball draft, when he was drafted by the San Diego Padres in the 38th round of the 2015 draft. He had been projected to go much higher in the draft, but for the fact that he had already committed to the University of Nevada, Las Vegas, and told interested MLB teams that he intended to attend the school for a year. He chose to honor his commitment and play college baseball for the UNLV Rebels, which left three years on his eligibility at the time, with the plan of playing professionally after college.

=== Los Angeles Dodgers (2016–2018) ===
==== Minor leagues ====
In the 2016 Major League Baseball draft, Kremer was selected in the 14th round by the Los Angeles Dodgers, 431st overall. He signed with the Dodgers for a signing bonus of $147,500. At the time, he threw a fastball in the 90–93 mph range that sometimes reached 94 miles per hour (151 km/h)-95 miles per hour (153 km/h), a slider, a curveball, and a splitter.

Kremer made his professional debut on July 3, 2016, for the Ogden Raptors of the Rookie Pioneer League. On August 11, he was promoted to the Great Lakes Loons of the Class A Midwest League. Kremer finished his first professional regular season between the two teams with a 2–1 record and a 2.27 ERA, as in 31 2/3 innings he struck out 35 batters, while giving up 19 hits and seven walks while holding hitters to a .176 batting average. In the playoffs, Kremer pitched 10 1/3 innings with an 0.87 ERA and six strikeouts, and recorded the final eight outs of the Loons' championship-clinching win over the Clinton LumberKings.

The Dodgers assigned Kremer to the Rancho Cucamonga Quakes of the High-A California League for the 2017 season. There he made 33 appearances for the team (including six starts), was 1–4 with three saves and a 5.18 ERA, and struck out 96 batters in 80 innings.

Kremer returned to the Quakes for the 2018 season and was named a California League Mid-Season All-Star. Kremer was 5–3 with a 3.30 ERA with 13.0 strikeouts per 9 innings (9th in the league) in 16 starts for the Quakes before he was promoted to the Tulsa Drillers of the Texas League on July 5. In his debut for them, he pitched a three-hit shutout against the Midland RockHounds while striking out 11. He was named the Texas League Pitcher of the Week on July 8.

=== Baltimore Orioles (2018–2026) ===
On July 18, 2018, the Dodgers traded Kremer, Yusniel Diaz, Rylan Bannon, Zach Pop, and Breyvic Valera to the Baltimore Orioles for Manny Machado. At the time, FanGraphs wrote of Kremer: "Throws 92–95, touches 97, above-average curveball, average change. If pitchability improves, he's a back-end starter. If not, solid relief option." He was assigned to the Bowie Baysox of the Double-A Eastern League and finished the year there. In 2018 in 25 starts between Rancho Cucamonga, Tulsa, and Bowie, he was 10–5 with a 2.88 ERA, striking out 178 batters (leading the entire minor leagues) in 131 1/3 innings pitched. He was a mid-season California League All Star.

Kremer started the 2019 season ranked as the No. 9 Orioles prospect by Baseball America. In 2019 Kremer pitched two starts for the Frederick Keys of the High-A Carolina League, 15 starts for Bowie, and four starts for the Norfolk Tides of the Triple-A International League. He was a combined 9–6 with a 3.72 ERA, as in 113 2/3 innings he struck out 122 batters, averaging 9.7 K/9, 2.9 BB/9, 0.87 HR/9, and a ground-ball rate just short of 40 percent.

Kremer played in the Arizona Fall League for the Surprise Saguaros following the 2019 season. Kremer pitched 19 innings with a 2.37 ERA and a 0.89 WHIP, giving up 13 hits and four walks, with 23 strikeouts. He was named a league All Star and was added to the Orioles' 40-man roster to protect him from being claimed in the Rule 5 draft.

Kremer pitched 5 1/3 scoreless innings in spring training in 2020. In July 2020, he was added to the team's 60-man player pool. Kremer was ranked as Baltimore's 9th-best prospect by MLB Pipeline.

==== 2020–21 ====
On September 6, 2020, the Orioles called Kremer up to the majors. In his MLB debut, he allowed only one run and one hit while striking out seven batters (the most in an Orioles' debut in two decades) in a six-inning start, and was the winning pitcher in a 5–1 victory over the New York Yankees at Camden Yards. He became the fourth Orioles starter to throw six innings or more of one-hit ball in his debut. He was the first Israeli citizen to pitch in the major leagues, and the second (after catcher Ryan Lavarnway) to play in the majors.

Kremer made more history by becoming just the second rookie to—in each of his first three starts—throw at least five innings, with one or no runs, four or fewer hits, and at least six strikeouts; Eduardo Rodriguez of the Boston Red Sox is the other pitcher to accomplish that feat.

Kremer ended the 2020 season with a 4.82 ERA, a 1–1 record, and 22 strikeouts in 18.2 innings over 4 starts.

Kremer struggled in 2021, with a 7.55 ERA, a 0–7 record, and 47 strikeouts in 53.2 innings over 13 starts.

==== 2022 ====
In 2022, Kremer had three straight scoreless starts of at least five innings pitched, which tied for the longest such streak in Orioles/St. Louis Browns franchise history. Before Kremer, the three prior Orioles with at least 18.2 scoreless innings in the span of three starts were Kevin Gausman, Fernando Valenzuela, and Jim Palmer. After 4 2/3 scoreless innings against the Texas Rangers, Kremer allowed a bases loaded sacrifice fly, ending his scoreless innings streak at 23 1/3 innings. On September 23, 2022, Kremer threw his first career shutout in a 6–0 victory over the Houston Astros.

In 2022, he was 8–7 with a 3.23 ERA, and his 8 wins were the second-most on the Orioles staff. He pitched 22 games (21 starts), in which he pitched 125.1 innings. He allowed 0.79 home runs per nine innings, the ninth-lowest rate in the AL. He relied mostly on his 94 mph fourseam fastball (34% of the time) and 88 mph cutter (31%), while also throwing an 84 mph changeup (15%), 76 mph curveball (12%), and 92 mph sinker (8%).

==== 2023 ====
On September 28, 2023, Kremer was the starting pitcher against the Boston Red Sox. He pitched 5.1 innings with 8 strikeouts, allowing zero runs. His pitching received a standing ovation by fans. Eventually, the Orioles won 2–0 and were made 2023 American League East division champions.

In the 2023 regular season, Kremer was 13–5 (his 13 wins being the 6th-most in the AL) for a .722 won-loss percentage (2nd in the AL), with a 4.12 ERA, as in 32 starts (7th) covering 172.2 innings he struck out 157 batters (8.183 strikeouts/9 innings; the 8th-best ratio in Orioles' history). His 46 strikeouts with his cutter were the third-most in Major League Baseball. On defense, he had a perfect 1.000 fielding percentage. He had a salary of $731,200.

==== 2024 ====
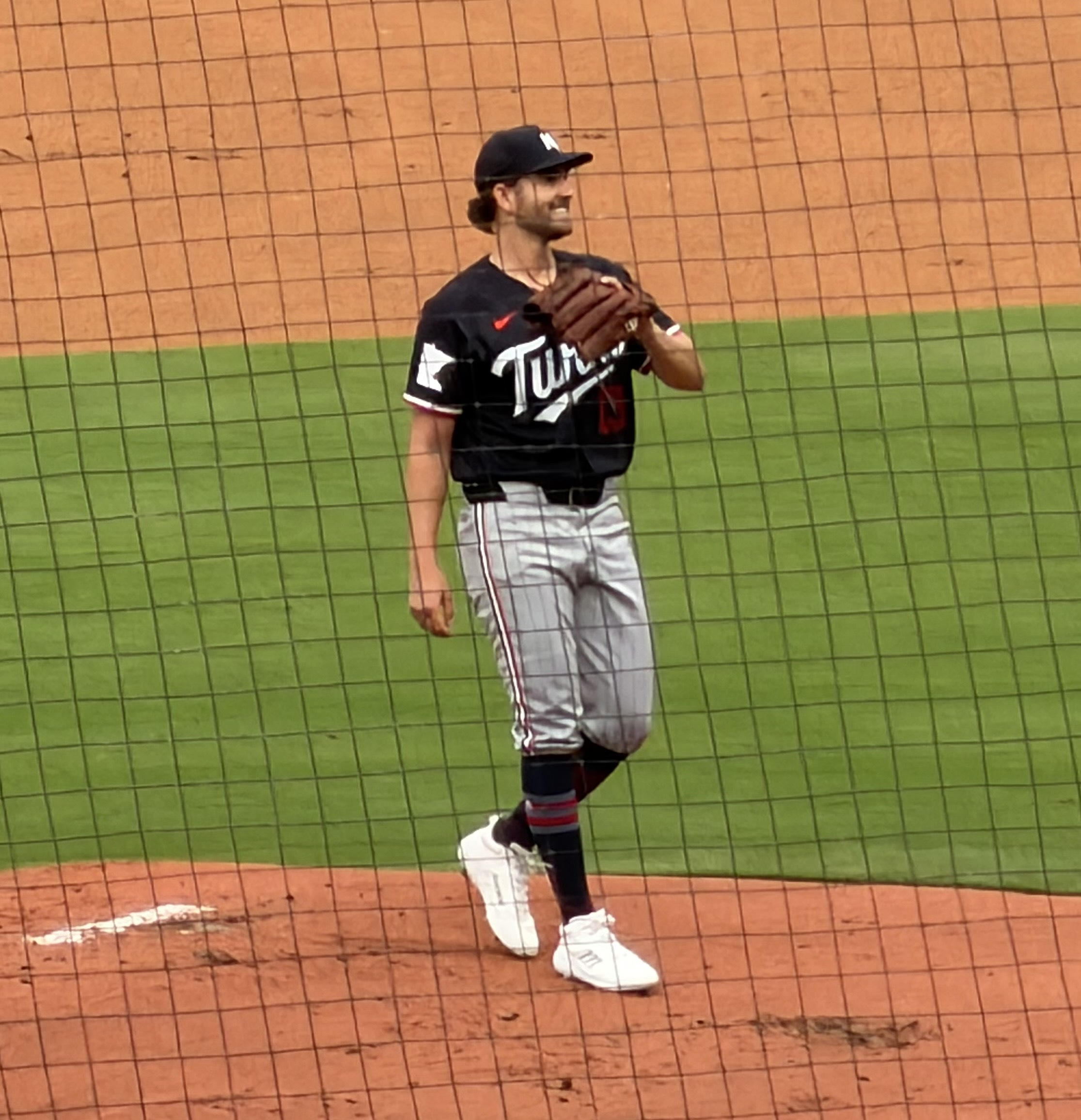
Dean Kremer pitching for the Twins in August 2026 in a game against the Royals

In the 2024 regular season, Kremer was 8–10 with a 4.10 ERA. In 24 starts covering 129 2/3 innings he struck out 123 batters (8.5 strikeouts/9 innings), held batters to a .220 batting average, and induced the highest-percentage of soft contact (23.1%) and the fourth-lowest exit velocity (87.4 mph) among AL pitchers with 120 or more innings. He had a salary of $756,000.

==== 2025–2026 ====
Kremer made 31 appearances (including 29 starts) for the Orioles during the 2025 campaign, compiling an 11-10 record and 4.19 ERA with 142 strikeouts across 171 2/3 innings pitched.

Kremer was optioned to Triple-A Norfolk to begin the 2026 season. He was placed on the injured list on April 23, 2026, due to a right quad strain. Kremer was transferred to the 60-day injured list on May 29. He was activated on July 1. Kremer started seven total games for the Orioles, struggling to a 1–4 record and 6.50 ERA with 38 strikeouts over 36 innings of work.

=== Minnesota Twins ===
On July 31, 2026, the Orioles traded Kremer to the Minnesota Twins in exchange for outfield prospect Jhomnardo Reyes.

== Israel national team ==
Kremer has competed several times for the Israel national baseball team in international tournaments, often as the team's ace starting pitcher.

=== European Baseball Championships ===
Kremer has pitched for Israel in the qualifying rounds for the 2016 European Baseball Championship. In both the B-Level and C-Level qualifiers, which took place in 2014 and 2015, he won the Most Valuable Pitcher award.

Kremer pitched in 2014 in Slovenia for Israel in the C-Level qualifier at the 2016 European Baseball Championship, going 2–0 with a 0.00 ERA. In 13 innings, he gave up six hits and a walk, while striking out 20 batters. He led all pitchers in the tournament in ERA, strikeouts, and wins. In the opening game against Finland, he went 5 innings, giving up 2 hits and 1 unearned run, and recording 9 strikeouts, while earning the win. He then pitched again during the semifinal game against Romania, going 8 innings, giving up 4 hits and 1 unearned run, and recording 5 strikeouts, while earning his second win of the qualifier.

Israel advanced to the 2015 B-level qualifier for the 2016 European Baseball Championship in Vienna, Austria. Kremer again pitched on the opening day, going 6 innings against Belarus, not giving up any runs, striking out 10, and recording another win. During Israel's fifth and final game of the B-level qualifier, against Sweden, Kremer started again going 7.1 innings, giving up 4 runs (3 earned) and 9 hits, and striking out 5.

=== World Baseball Classic ===
==== 2016–17 ====
Kremer pitched in September 2016 for Israel in the qualifier for the 2017 World Baseball Classic. He was, at 20 years of age, the youngest player on the team. Kremer said: "I've been dreaming about playing for this team, since I first saw them in 2012 and heard about the WBC and representing Israel." In Israel's third and final game, in which it qualified for the 2017 World Baseball Classic by defeating Great Britain, Kremer pitched the 9th inning, giving up two hits, recording one strikeout, and not giving up any runs.

Kremer pitched for Team Israel at the 2017 World Baseball Classic main tournament, in March 2017.

==== 2023 ====
In July 2022, Kremer committed to play for Team Israel in the 2023 World Baseball Classic. He played for Team Israel manager and former All Star Ian Kinsler, and alongside All Star outfielder Joc Pederson, pitcher Richard Bleier, and others.

== Maccabiah Games ==
Kremer pitched for the Team USA baseball team in the 2013 Maccabiah Games in Israel. The team won the gold medal in the Games.

== See also ==
- List of Jewish Major League Baseball players
- List of Jews in Sports
- List of Major League Baseball annual shutout leaders
