= Steinman, Virginia =

Unincorporated community in Virginia, United States

Coordinates: 37°10′43″N 82°20′30″W

Steinman is an unincorporated community in Dickenson County, Virginia, United States.

== History ==
A post office was established at Steinman in 1922, and remained in operation until it was discontinued in 1959. The community was named for the Steinman brothers, coal mining officials.
