= Steinman =

Steinman is a surname. Notable people with the surname include:

- Alan M. Steinman (born 1945), American physician, United States Coast Guard admiral and activist
- David Steinman, American environmentalist and writer
- David B. Steinman (1886–1960), American structural engineer
- Eliezer Steinman (1892–1970), Israeli writer, journalist and editor
- Jim Steinman (1947–2021), American rock composer and pianist
- Ralph M. Steinman (1943–2011), Canadian immunologist and cell biologist, Nobel prize winner 2011
- Sonia Steinman Gold (1917–2009), American alleged spy for the Soviet Union

== Fictional characters ==
- Dr. Steinman, a character in the Bioshock video game series

== See also ==
- Steinman, Virginia, a community in the United States
- Aharon Leib Shteinman (c. 1912 – 2017), Israeli rabbi
- Steinmann
