= Skyline Conference men's basketball tournament =

- Conference basketball championship
- Sport: Basketball
- Conference: Skyline Conference
- Number of teams: 8
- Format: Single-elimination tournament
- Current champion: Yeshiva University (5th)
- Official website: Skyline men's basketball

The Skyline Conference men's basketball tournament is the annual conference basketball championship tournament for the NCAA Division III Skyline Conference. It is a single-elimination tournament and seeding is based on regular season records.

The winner receives the Skyline's automatic bid to the NCAA Men's Division III Basketball Championship.

== Results ==
- Record is incomplete prior to 2003

Year	Champions	Score	Runner-up	Venue
2003	USMMA Mariners	65–54	Mount Saint Mary	Kings Point, NY
2004	Old Westbury	68–66	Mount Saint Mary	Old Westbury, NY
2005	Mount Saint Mary	87–79	Farmingdale State	East Farmingdale, NY
2006	Farmingdale State	87–79	Manhattanville	East Farmingdale, NY
2007	Manhattanville	87–68	Old Westbury	Purchase, NY
2008	Farmingdale State	91–71	St. Joseph's–Long Island	East Farmingdale, NY
2009	St. Joseph's–Long Island	69–68	Farmingdale State	East Farmingdale, NY
2010	Purchase	92–79	Old Westbury	Old Westbury, NY
2011	Purchase	81–66	St. Joseph's–Long Island	Purchase, NY
2012	Farmingdale State	83–64	Purchase	East Farmingdale, NY
2013	Purchase	71–48	Farmingdale State	Purchase, NY
2014	Purchase	100–82	Mount Saint Mary	Purchase, NY
2015	Sage	84–70	St. Joseph's–Long Island	Albany, NY
2016	Old Wesbury	63–47	St. Joseph's–Brooklyn	Old Wesbury, NY
2017	Farmingdale State	77–75	Sage	East Farmingdale, NY
2018	Yeshiva	87–81	Purchase	Purchase, NY
2019	Farmingdale State	81–75	Yeshiva	East Farmingdale, NY
2020	Yeshiva	86–74	Purchase	New York, NY
2021	Cancelled due to COVID-19 pandemic			
2022	Yeshiva	74–40	Manhattanville	New York, NY
2023	Farmingdale State	71–65	Manhattanville	Farmingdale, NY
2024	Farmingdale State	87–68	Yeshiva	Farmingdale, NY
2025	Yeshiva	81–78	Farmingdale State	Framingdale, NY
2026	Yeshiva	79–72	Farmingdale State	New York, NY

== Championship records ==
- Results incomplete before 2003

School	Finals Record	Finals Appearances	Championships
Farmingdale State	7–4	11	2006, 2008, 2012, 2017, 2019, 2023, 2024
Yeshiva	5–2	7	2018, 2020, 2022, 2025, 2026
Purchase	4–3	7	2010, 2011, 2013, 2014
Old Westbury	2–2	4	2004, 2016
St. Joseph's–Long Island	1–3	4	2009
Manhattanville	1–3	4	2007
Mount Saint Mary	1–2	3	2005
Sage	1–1	2	2015
Merchant Marine	1-0	1	2003
St. Joseph's–Brooklyn	0–1	1	

- Schools highlighted in pink are former members of the Skyline
- SUNY Maritime, Mount Saint Vincent, and Sarah Lawrence have not yet qualified for the tournament finals
- Bard, Centenary, NYU Poly, and Stevens never qualified for the tournament finals as conference members

== See also ==
- NCAA Division III men's basketball tournament
