= Nell S. Steinmetz =

American children's librarian (born 1897)

Nell Steckel Steinmetz (born January 21, 1897) was an American children's librarian and lecturer.

== Early life ==
Nell Steckel was born in New Jersey, on January 21, 1897, the daughter of Robert W. Steckel (1860–1955). The family moved to California in 1908 when she was 11 years old.

== Career ==
Nell S. Steinmetz was a Children's librarian. For two and a half years she worked at the Tuolumne County Free Library, and was director of small community theatres and later she was Children's librarian at the Echo Park Branch of the Los Angeles Public Library.

She was a lecturer on children's literature.

In 1978 she was chairman of the 75th anniversary committee of the Coleman Chamber Music Association, the oldest series of chamber music concerts in the United States. Steinmetz was vicepresident of the Association at least since 1969.

== Personal life ==
Nell S. Steinmetz had one son David Henry Steinmetz, III. She lived at 1086 Kensington Road, and later, in the 1940s, at 5341 Ellenwood Drive, Los Angeles, California.

She is buried at Forest Lawn Memorial Park (Glendale) along with her father.
