= Manny Machado =

American baseball player (born 1992)

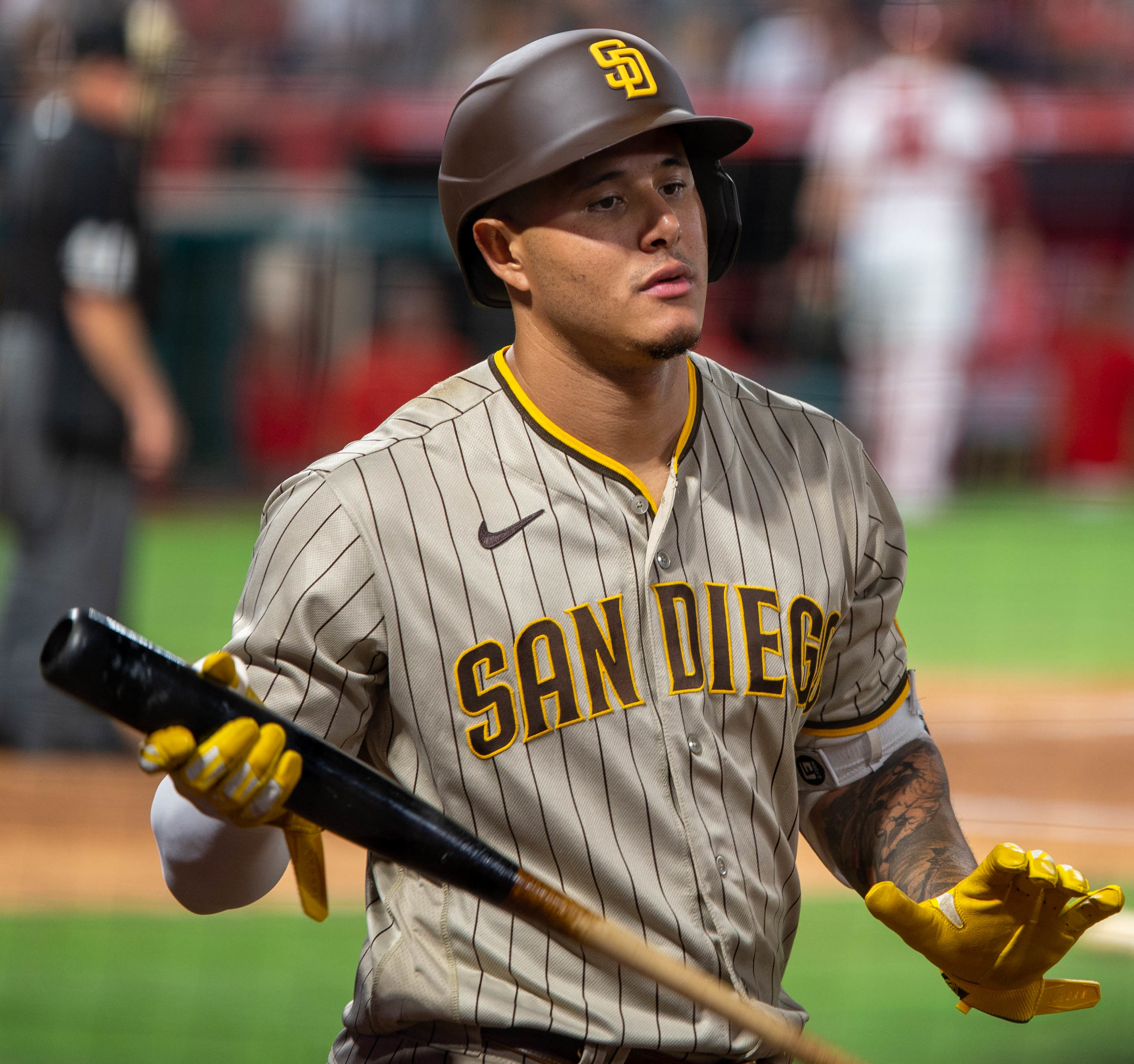
- Machado with the San Diego Padres in 2021

San Diego Padres – No. 13
- Third baseman / Shortstop
- Born: July 6, 1992 (age 34); Miami, Florida, U.S.
- Bats: Right Throws: Right

MLB debut
- August 9, 2012, for the Baltimore Orioles

MLB statistics (through 2026 season)
- Batting average: .274
- Hits: 2,197
- Home runs: 399
- Runs batted in: 1,235
- Stats at Baseball Reference

Teams
- Baltimore Orioles (2012–2018); Los Angeles Dodgers (2018); San Diego Padres (2019–present)

Career highlights and awards
- 7× All-Star (2013, 2015, 2016, 2018, 2021, 2022, 2025); 2× All-MLB First Team (2020, 2022); 2× Gold Glove Award (2013, 2015); 3× Silver Slugger Award (2020, 2024, 2025)
Medals
Men's baseball
Representing Dominican Republic
World Baseball Classic
Bronze medal – third place	2026 Miami	Team

Manuel Arturo Machado (Spanish: [maˈtʃaðo]; born July 6, 1992) is an American professional baseball third baseman and shortstop for the San Diego Padres of Major League Baseball (MLB). Highly recruited from an early age, he was raised in Miami, where he attended Brito High School and was drafted by the Baltimore Orioles with the third overall pick in the 2010 MLB draft. He bats and throws right-handed. Born in the United States, he represents the Dominican Republic internationally.

Machado made his MLB debut with Baltimore in August 2012. He had his breakout year in 2013, earning a spot on the American League (AL) All-Star team on his way to leading the league in doubles with 51. He was also recognized as one of the best fielders in the game, winning a Gold Glove Award. His defensive prowess has earned him frequent comparisons to former Orioles third baseman and Hall of Famer Brooks Robinson. In 2018, an impending free agent, Machado was traded to the Los Angeles Dodgers and helped the team reach the World Series. That offseason, Machado signed a 10-year, $300 million contract with the Padres, the richest contract in the history of North American sports at the time. Since 2013, Machado has made the All-Star Game seven times, the All-MLB First Team two times, won two Gold Gloves, and three Silver Slugger Awards. He is the Padres' all-time home run leader.

== Early life ==
Machado was born and raised in Miami, Florida. He was raised by his mother, Rosa Machado, his grandfather, Francisco Nunez, and his uncle, Geovanny Brito. He is of Dominican heritage. Machado grew up in Hialeah alongside future MLB center fielder Albert Almora, and while they are not related by blood they consider each other to be cousins.

Machado attended Brito Miami Private School and committed to attend Florida International University. He grew up a fan of the Florida Marlins.

== Professional career ==
=== Minor leagues ===
The Baltimore Orioles selected Machado in the first round, with the third overall selection, in the 2010 MLB draft. He was the second high school player drafted, as well as the second position player. He signed a $5.25 million contract, just minutes before the deadline on August 16, 2010. While his agent Scott Boras was negotiating his contract, Machado spent the summer of 2010 playing for USA Baseball's 18-and-under national team. Machado was introduced to the Orioles in mid-September when the Orioles hosted the New York Yankees.

On August 22, Machado reported to the Orioles minor league complex to join the Gulf Coast League Orioles. Machado made his professional debut with the Gulf Coast League Orioles on August 27, 2010, where he went 0-for-3 with a strikeout. He played as the designated hitter. Machado hit his first professional home run in his second game with the Orioles. Machado made his debut with the Low-A Aberdeen IronBirds of the New York–Penn League on August 30, 2010, where he went 1-for-3 with a single. He played shortstop, instead of being the DH, as he did with the Orioles, and he was pulled after the fifth inning. Machado began the 2011 season with the Delmarva Shorebirds, playing shortstop. He hit five home runs before May 1, and was named the South Atlantic League player of the week for April 25 – May 1. After missing several weeks with a knee injury, he returned to play 10 more games and appear in the SAL All-Star Game on June 21, 2011. After the game, he was promoted to the High-A Frederick Keys. He was named to appear in the 2012 All-Star Futures Game.

=== Baltimore Orioles (2012–2018) ===
==== 2012 ====
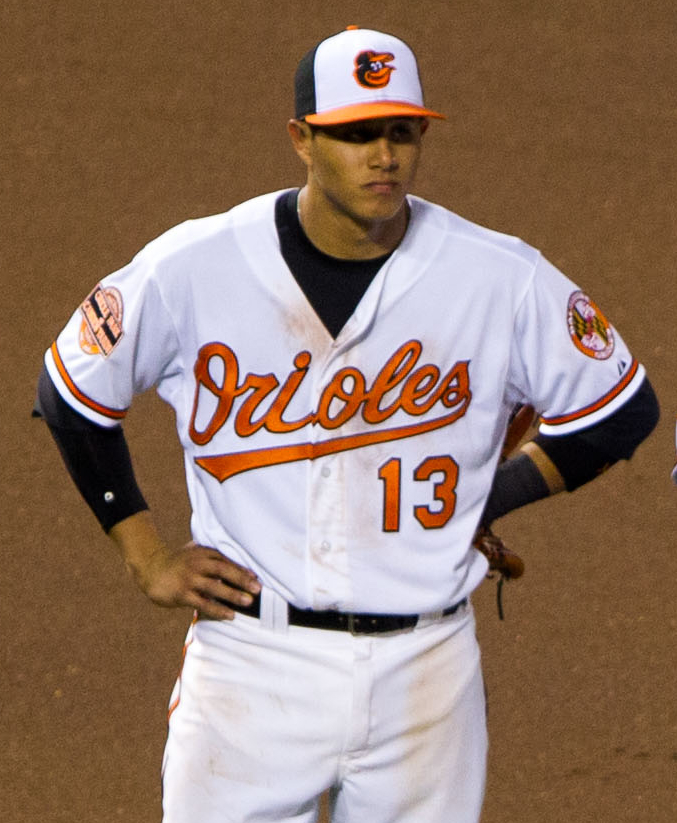
Machado with the Orioles in 2012

The Orioles promoted Machado to MLB from the Double-A Bowie Baysox on August 9, against the Kansas City Royals. He started at third base, as the team already had J. J. Hardy at shortstop. The following day, against the same opponent, he hit his first and second career home runs, making him the youngest Oriole and 12th youngest player in major league history to have a multi-homer game. The two home runs were both off former number-one overall draft choice Luke Hochevar. He then hit his third career home run on August 12 off Bruce Chen. In Game 3 of the 2012 ALDS, Machado hit his first career postseason home run. The Orioles lost the division series to the New York Yankees in five games.

Machado finished his rookie season having played in all 51 of the remaining Oriole games. In 202 plate appearances, he hit .262 with eight doubles, three triples, 7 home runs, 26 RBI, and two steals in as many attempts. He collected 50 hits and scored 24 runs.

==== 2013 ====
Machado had three hits on May 27, giving him 40 multi-hit games in his career, tying Ty Cobb for the major league record for the most multi-hit games before age 21 in history; on May 30, he went 2-for-3 to break Cobb's record. Machado's 44 hits in May 2013 were the second-most in a month by a player under 21 behind Mickey Mantle's 46 in July 1952. At the end of May, Machado led the major leagues with 25 doubles and was tied for the MLB lead in hits (79) with reigning AL MVP Miguel Cabrera. Exactly halfway through the season, Machado got his 37th double, putting him on pace to break the single-season record (67) in his first full season.

On June 27, 2013, Machado argued a correctly ruled strike-three call, leading to his first career MLB ejection. Coincidentally, this was also the first career MLB ejection for the umpire who threw him out, Will Little.

An All-Star, he slashed .310/.337/.470 with 7 home runs, 45 RBI, and 39 doubles in the first half.

Machado suffered a left knee injury when reaching first base after a hit on September 23, 2013. Machado received immediate medical attention and left the game on a stretcher. The injury also ended his consecutive games played streak at 207. Machado was ruled out for the rest of the 2013 season. He finished the year hitting .283/.314/.432 with 14 home runs, 71 RBI, and 51 doubles. He led the American League in doubles, at-bats (667) and fielding percentage at third base (.973).

On October 10, Machado opted to have reconstructive surgery performed on his knee to reduce the chance of future dislocations. The surgery would sideline him for 4–6 months, but he was still expected to return sometime around Opening Day.

On October 29, Machado won the Gold Glove Award at third base, the first by an Oriole third baseman since Brooks Robinson's 16-year run from 1960 to 1975. On November 8 of the same year, Machado won the AL Platinum Glove Award.

==== 2014 ====
On April 29, 2014, he was removed from the disabled list after knee surgery recovery and on May 1, he was greeted by a standing ovation from the hometown Baltimore fans prior to the first game of a doubleheader sweep against the Pittsburgh Pirates. On June 1, 2014, Machado hit his 1st career grand slam in a 9–4 Orioles victory over the Houston Astros.

On June 6, 2014, Machado was running to third base on a ground ball when he was tagged by Oakland Athletics third baseman Josh Donaldson. This incident led to a bench-clearing brawl. On June 8, 2014, Machado struck Athletics catcher Derek Norris with his bat during the follow-through of his swing. Norris was taken out of the game as a result. In the 8th inning, Machado threw his bat in the direction of third base in response to two consecutive inside pitches thrown by Oakland reliever Fernando Abad. The umpires determined that the bat was meant for Abad, and both Abad and Machado were ejected from the game. The next day, Machado issued a formal apology to his teammates and Oakland. On June 10, Machado was fined and suspended five games for his actions. After losing an appeal, Machado began serving his suspension on June 30.

On August 11, Machado injured his right knee while batting in a home game against the New York Yankees. Although originally describing it as a sprain, ten days later the Orioles announced that the injury required surgery and that Machado was out for the season.

==== 2015 ====
Machado started the 2015 season healthy. By June 18, he had already tied his career high for home runs, which was 14 in 2013. He was named to the American League roster for the 2015 MLB All-Star Game and was selected as a participant for the 2015 Home Run Derby. Machado hit two home runs and stole two bases against the Toronto Blue Jays on October 1, becoming only the 16th player—and first Oriole—to have a multi-homer, multi-steal game since 1901. He became the seventh Oriole to have 20 home runs and 20 stolen bases in a season.

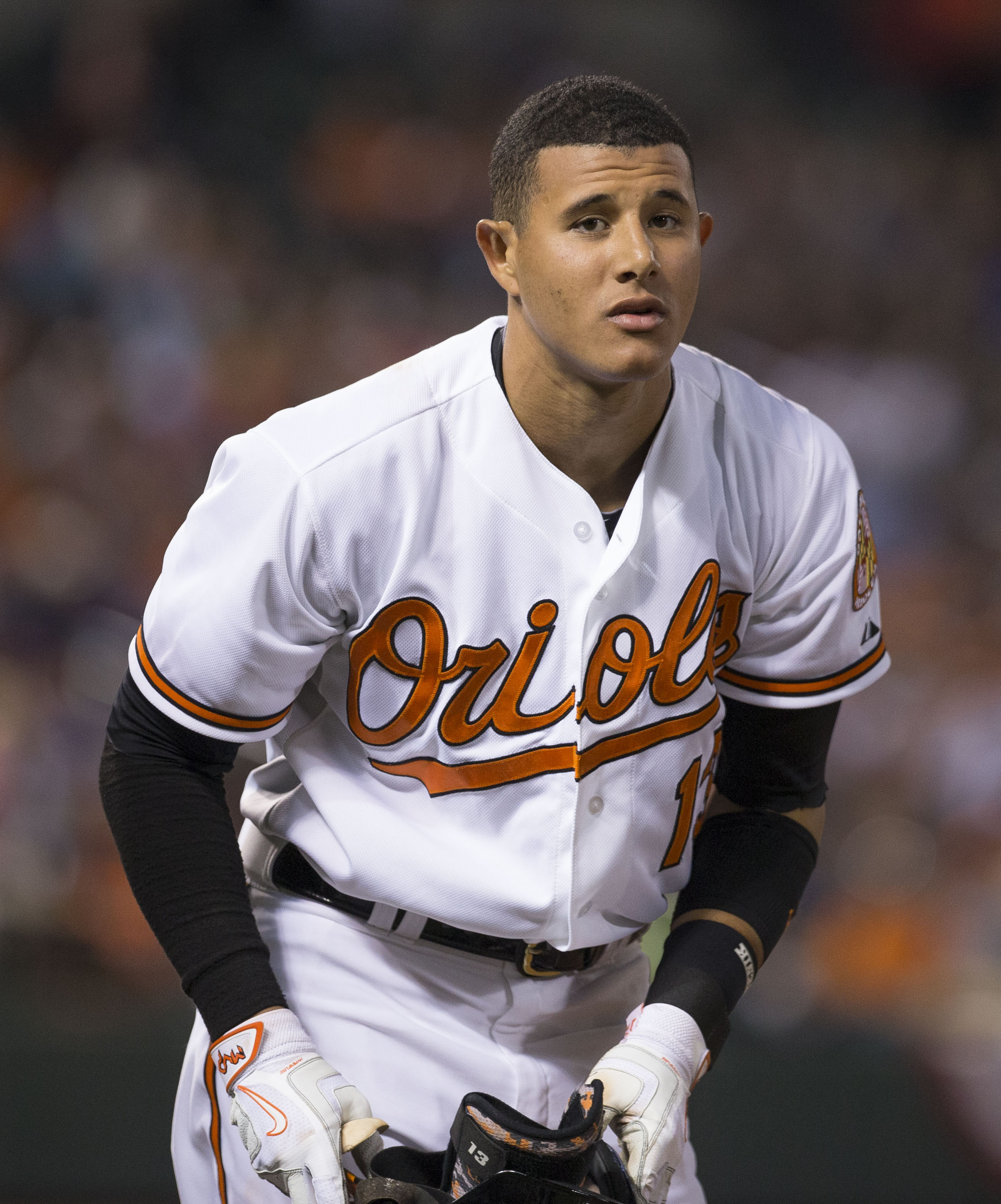
Machado during the 2015 season

Machado was the only major league player to appear in all 162 games in 2015. He batted .286 after collecting 181 hits, along with 35 home runs, 86 RBIs, and 20 steals. He led the American League in power-speed number (25.5). He made 21 errors, fifth-most of all players in the AL and second-most of all AL third basemen. He finished fourth in the American League in MVP voting and won his second career Rawlings Gold Glove for his outstanding defensive play at third. Machado set career-high numbers in games played (162), runs scored, home runs, RBIs, walks, steals, batting average, on-base percentage, slugging percentage, on-base plus slugging, and Wins Above Replacement.

==== 2016 ====
Machado hit safely in the first ten games of the season. On April 23, Machado extended his hit streak to 16 games, a new career-best. Machado's hit streak peaked at 16 games before ending. During the hot streak, Machado went 27-for-68 while slashing .397/.446/.779, while hitting six home runs and driving in 11. On April 28, he hit his second career grand slam and drove in a career-high five runs in a 10–2 victory over the Chicago White Sox. Machado was named AL Player of the Month for April, after going 33-for-96 (.344), hitting ten doubles, seven home runs, driving in 17 runs, while slugging .667 with a .394 on-base percentage.

Machado set a new career-high for RBIs on May 8 against the A's, when he hit two home runs (including his second grand slam of the year) while driving in six in an 11–3 victory.

On June 7, Machado charged the mound against Kansas City Royals' pitcher Yordano Ventura, punching Ventura in the face and igniting a benches-clearing brawl. Machado charged the mound after Ventura hit Machado with a first-pitch, 99-mph fastball in the back. Both players were ejected. On June 9, Machado received a four-game suspension for the incident, which he was initially going to appeal, in the end deciding not to. The suspension was served June 19–22, 2016. In his first game back, Machado went 2-for-4 and hit a home run.

Machado slashed .318/.375/.569 with a .944 OPS, 19 home runs, and 53 RBIs before the All-Star break. He collected 109 hits and was named to his third career All-Star game and his first ASG start. Manny went 0-for-3 in the ASG.

He was the second player in MLB history to hit a home run in each of the first three innings of a game in a 10–2 victory over the White Sox at U.S. Cellular Field on August 7. The feat was previously accomplished by the White Sox's Carl Reynolds in a 15–4 win which was the nightcap of a doubleheader at Yankee Stadium on July 2, 1930. Machado was actually the first to hit all three that cleared the fence; two of Reynolds' were inside the park. The three homers within the first three innings of a contest were achieved for the first time since the Seattle Mariners' Mike Cameron did it in the same ballpark in a 15–4 win on May 2, 2002. Machado was also the ninth player to homer in three consecutive innings at any point during a match and the first Oriole to hit three in a game since Chris Davis in a 9–2 victory over the Pittsburgh Pirates at PNC Park on May 20, 2014.

On August 26, Machado hit his 30th and 31st home runs of the season, becoming the third Oriole on the year to hit 30 home runs (Mark Trumbo & Chris Davis). The three became the first trio of Orioles to hit 30+ homers in a single season. It was also Machado's tenth homer of the month, making him, Trumbo, and Davis the first trio of Orioles with 10 or more home runs in a month. On August 30, Machado hit his 100th career home run in a 5–3 win over the Toronto Blue Jays. He hit the homer in his 578th game, making him the third-fastest Oriole to hit 100 homers. He also became the youngest Oriole to hit his 100th home run (24 years, 55 days).

Machado hit his MLB-leading third grand slam of the season on September 6 in an 11–2 win over the Rays. With the homer, he set a new career-high in the RBI column, surpassing his 86 from the previous season. It was also his 102nd career homer, tying him with teammate J. J. Hardy for 25th on the all-time Orioles home run list. He became the youngest Oriole ever to have three grand slams in the same season. He also tied the MLB record for most grand slams in a season at age 24 or younger. Manny had five RBIs in the game and joined the likes of Miguel Tejada and Jim Gentile as the only Orioles players with four five-RBI games in the same season. On September 18, Machado surpassed his previous season-high in home runs, hitting his 36th, against the Tampa Bay Rays. Machado ended his regular season having played in 157 games, slashing .294/.343/.533 while hitting a career-high 37 home runs and driving in a career-high 96 runs. He recorded career highs in runs scored, strikeouts, batting average, slugging percentage, OPS, and total bases.

==== 2017 ====
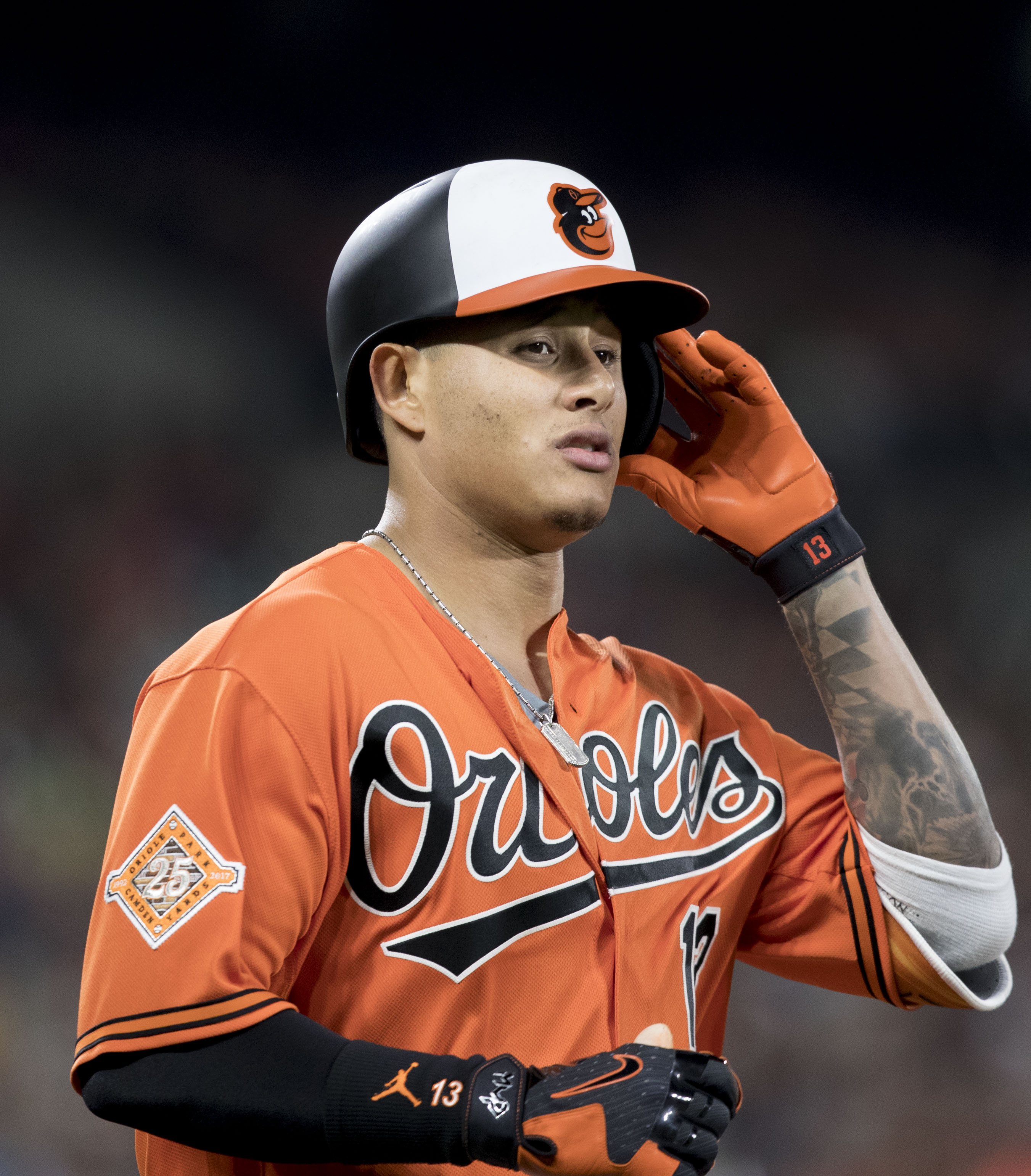
Machado in 2017

On January 13, Machado and the Orioles avoided arbitration by agreeing to a $11.5 million deal for the 2017 season. On April 16, Machado hit his second home run of the season and moved into a tie for 26th on the Orioles all-time list with 107. On April 28, 2017, Machado hit a home run off CC Sabathia that bounced off the facade of the deck above Monument Park in straightaway center field, measuring 470 feet. Although the Orioles led 9–1, they lost 11–14 in 10 innings.

On April 21, Machado became the center of controversy surrounding his slide that injured Dustin Pedroia and sidelined the latter for three games. Machado maintained that the allegedly late slide was unintentional, and contacted Pedroia after the game. Nevertheless, two days later, Red Sox pitcher Eduardo Rodriguez appeared to intentionally throw at Machado's knees, missing each time. A few innings later, a pitch from reliever Matt Barnes narrowly missed Machado's head and hit his bat. Barnes was ejected and received a 4-game suspension. Barnes denied the near-miss was intentional: "That's kind of a line you don't cross...fortunately, it didn't hit him, but I think he's got every right to be mad that that one got loose." A week later, on May 2, Machado dodged a pitch from Red Sox pitcher Chris Sale that ended up missing behind him. Machado expressed his displeasure with how MLB had handled the situation after the game in a profanity-laced interview:

"If you're going to f—ing hit me, hit me, go ahead. Don't let the s— keep f—ing lingering around and keep trying to f—ing hit people...It's f—ing bulls—, and MLB should do something about it. F—ing pitchers out there with f—ing balls in their hands throwing 100 miles per hour, trying to hit people. I've got a f—ing bat too. I could go up there and crush somebody if I wanted to, but you know what? I'll get suspended for a year and the pitcher only gets suspended for two games. That's not cool."

On May 10, Machado became the first Oriole in franchise history to collect 270 extra-base hits before turning 25 – only the 30th player in MLB history to do so.

On August 7, Machado hit a game-winning grand slam against the Angels in the seventh inning. A week later he hit his second grand slam of the season. Four days later, Machado hit a walk-off grand slam against the Angels, his third home run of the game and his seventh career grand slam. It was also his second career three-homer game, joining Chris Davis, Goose Goslin, Eddie Murray and Boog Powell as the only Orioles in franchise history with multiple three-homer games. He also became the first Orioles player to record multiple 3-grand slam seasons and just the second player in recorded MLB history with back-to-back seasons of three or more grand slams. On August 23, he hit a walk-off solo home run, the fourth of his career. In all, Machado hit three walk-off home runs in 2017, the most by any MLB player that season.

Machado won AL Player of the Month in August, slashing .341/.348/.690 with an OPS of 1.038. He hit 12 homers, six doubles, and one triple while driving in 35 runs and scoring 23 times.

Despite a poor first half, Machado finished his season strong in the second half, ending the year having slashed .259/.310/.471 with 33 doubles, 33 home runs, 95 RBI, and nine stolen bases. He made 14 errors, second-most among all AL third basemen. He was also a finalist for the Rawlings Gold Glove award, losing out to fellow AL East third baseman Evan Longoria.

==== 2018 ====
In 2018, Machado was moved back to shortstop, his natural position. Batting .313 with 21 home runs and 60 RBIs, Machado was named the starting shortstop for the 2018 MLB All-Star Game.

=== Los Angeles Dodgers (2018) ===
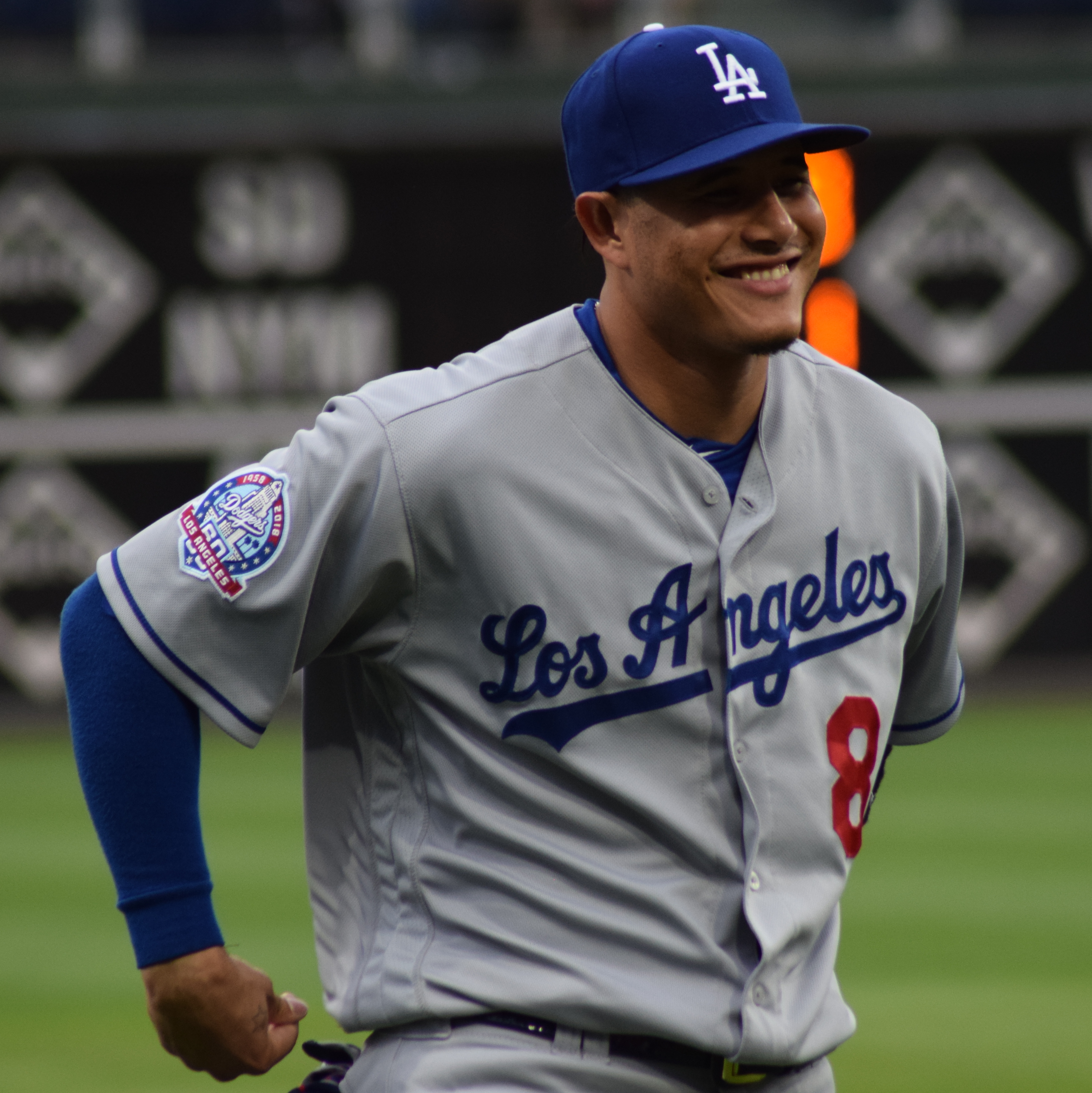
Machado with the Dodgers in 2018

On July 18, 2018, Machado was traded to the Los Angeles Dodgers for Yusniel Diaz, Dean Kremer, Rylan Bannon, Breyvic Valera and Zach Pop. Unable to use his No. 13 uniform number in Los Angeles since it was already worn by infielder Max Muncy, Machado chose uniform No. 8 because he was a Kobe Bryant fan growing up. He debuted as a Dodger on July 20 against the Milwaukee Brewers and had two singles and two walks. He recorded his 1,000th career hit on August 9, off Tyler Anderson of the Colorado Rockies. In 66 games with the Dodgers, Machado finished with a .273 batting average, 13 home runs, and 42 RBI. Overall in 2018, combined with both teams, Machado played 162 games with a .297 average, 35 doubles, 37 home runs, and 103 RBI.

After defeating the Rockies 5–2 in a tiebreaker, the Dodgers clinched the NL West pennant. Machado was fined an undisclosed amount for the way he ran into first base in Game 4 of the National League Championship Series against the Brewers. Machado intentionally caught the foot of Brewers' first baseman Jesús Aguilar with his own. The action prompted the benches to clear, and the Brewers' fan base still hold onto an animosity toward Machado in the years that have followed.

In the 2018 World Series, the Dodgers faced off against the Boston Red Sox. On the eve of the World Series, Pedroia told WEEI's Rob Bradford about being injured by Machado's slide in 2017, saying "I think about it all the time." And when Bradford asked if there's been any contact with Machado since then, Pedroia had a terse response, "no." Red Sox fans also had not forgotten the dirty slide, so Machado was booed heavily at Fenway Park for games one and two. He hit .182 in the series with four hits. In the deciding game five which clinched the title for the Red Sox, Machado was the final out as he struck out against Chris Sale.

=== San Diego Padres (2019–present) ===
Machado signed a 10-year, $300 million contract with the San Diego Padres on February 21, 2019. It was the largest free-agent contract in American sports history until Bryce Harper signed a 13-year, $330 million contract with the Philadelphia Phillies two weeks later.

==== 2019 ====
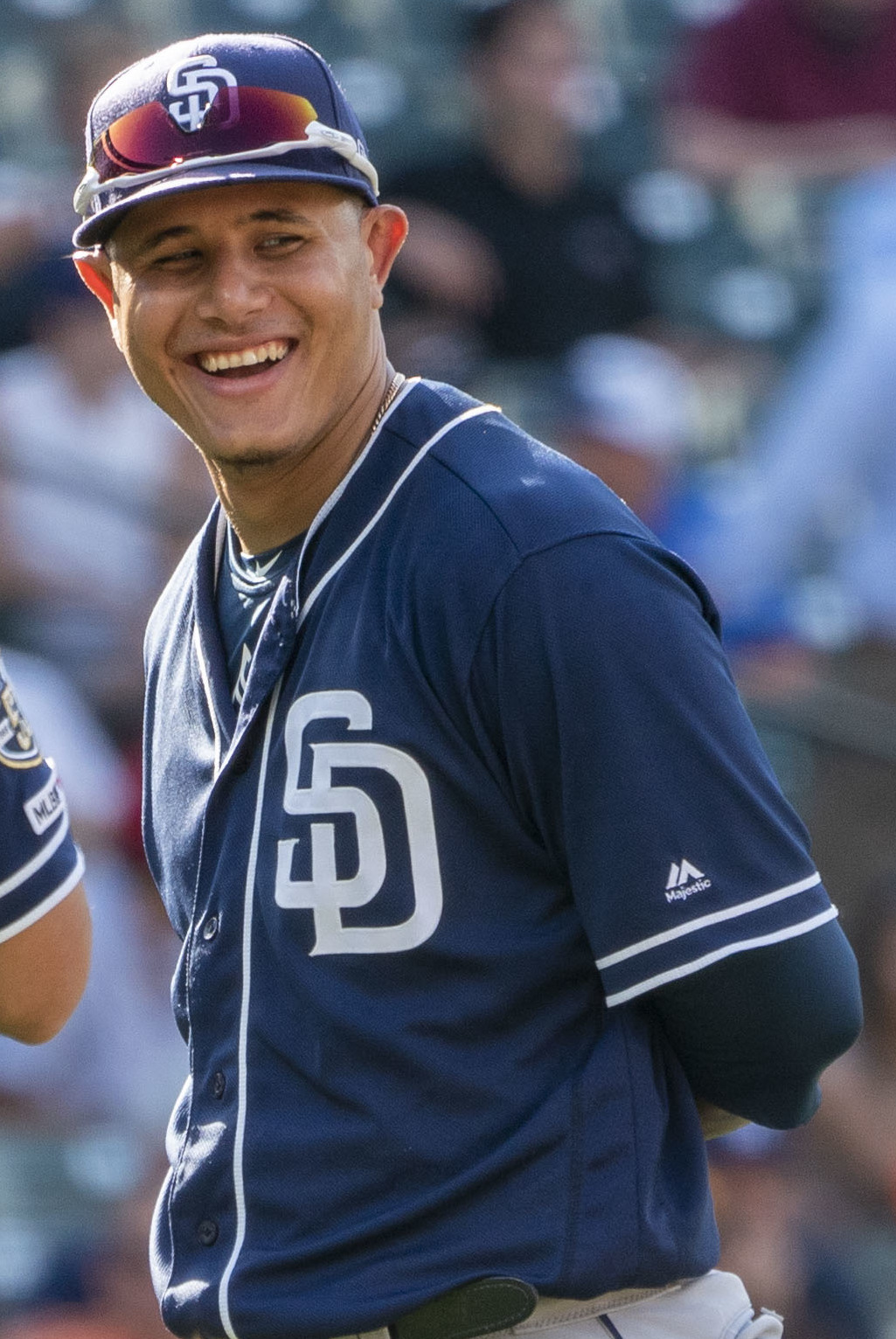
Machado with the Padres in 2019

In his first year in San Diego, Machado hit .256/.334/.462 with 32 home runs and 85 RBIs and led the majors with 24 double plays grounded into.

==== 2020 ====
In Machado's second year with the Padres, which was shortened to 60 games due to the COVID-19 pandemic, he hit .304/.370/.580 while finishing third in the National League with 16 home runs and 47 RBIs. He also led all qualifying third basemen with a .987 fielding percentage. He finished third in NL MVP voting, behind Freddie Freeman and Mookie Betts.

==== 2021 ====
Machado was named to the 2021 MLB All-Star Game after Ronald Acuña Jr. suffered a torn ACL. Machado finished the 2021 season batting .278/.347/.489 with 28 home runs and 106 RBIs. He led the National League with 11 sacrifice flies.

==== 2022 ====
Machado finished the 2022 season batting .298/.366/.531 with 32 home runs and 102 RBIs. He finished sixth in the National League in RBIs, runs scored, and extra-base hits, and finished second in NL MVP voting behind Paul Goldschmidt of the St. Louis Cardinals.

==== 2023 ====
On February 28, 2023, Machado signed a new 11-year contract extension with the Padres worth $350 million; the new extension includes a full no-trade provision and keeps Machado with the Padres through 2033. On April 4, Machado became the first MLB player to be ejected for arguing a pitch clock violation. On July 15, Machado hit his 300th career home run off of Matt Strahm of the Philadelphia Phillies. In 138 games for San Diego, he batted .258/.319/.462 with 30 home runs and 91 RBI. Following the season on October 3, Machado underwent right elbow extensor tendon repair surgery, a procedure that comes with a recovery time of 4–6 months.

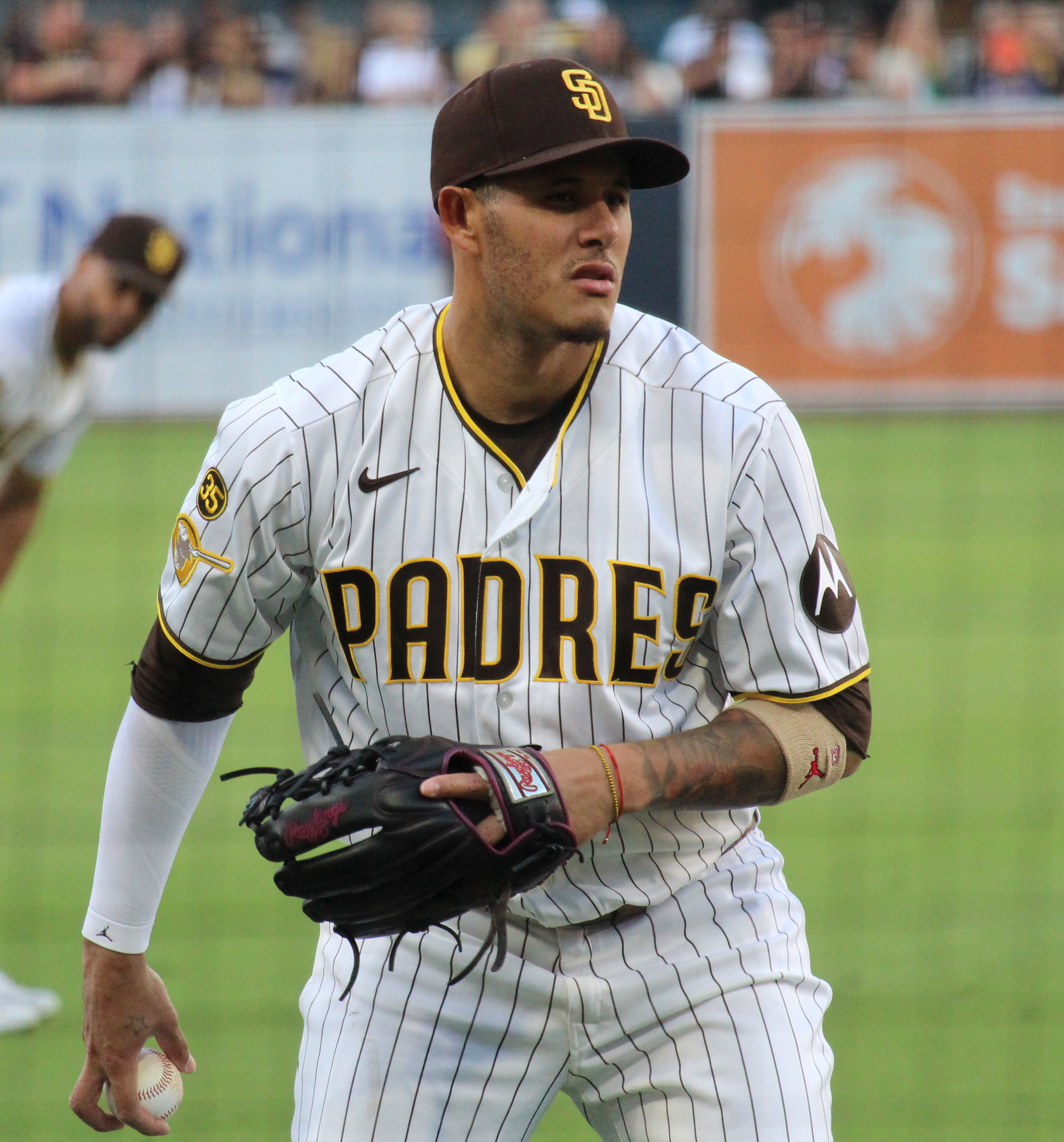
Machado in 2026

==== 2024 ====
Machado homered for his 1,000th career RBI on July 27, 2024, at Camden Yards, driving in three runs as the Padres won, 9–4. On September 10, 2024, he became the new Padres' career home run leader with 164 after homering off George Kirby of the Seattle Mariners to break Nate Colbert's record. After batting .263/.325/.472 with 29 home runs, 105 RBI, and 163 hits, Machado earned his second career Silver Slugger Award.

==== 2025 ====
Machado scored his 1,000th career run on April 8, 2025, against the Athletics when he hit a solo home run in the first inning of the game, but the Padres lost to the Athletics, 10–4 On June 5, Machado blasted his 350th career home run off pitcher Robbie Ray in the bottom of the third inning. He is one of only 33 players since at least 1901 to reach that mark at age 32 or younger and one of only 102 players to reach that mark at any age. On July 7, Machado recorded his 2,000th career hit with a fourth-inning single off D-backs righty Zac Gallen in Monday night's series opener at Petco Park. He becomes the fifth active player to reach 2,000 hits as he joins Freddie Freeman, Jose Altuve, Andrew McCutchen, and Paul Goldschmidt as the only active players with 2,000 hits.

== International career ==
=== COPABE Pan Am "AAA" Championship (United States) ===
In 2009, he played for the 18U United States team in the COPABE Pan Am "AAA" Championship. They finished 8–0, won the gold medal, and qualified for the 2010 World Junior Baseball Championship.

=== World Baseball Classic (Dominican Republic) ===
Machado has played for the Dominican Republic in the 2017 World Baseball Classic, 2023 World Baseball Classic and 2026 World Baseball Classic. In 2017, he earned the nickname "El Ministro de la Defensa" for his defense. He was named the most valuable player in the first round's Pool C, in which he batted .357. The Dominican team lost to the US in Pool F, failing to advance to the championship round. Machado batted .269/.321/.462 in six games while hitting a pair of doubles and a home run. 6 years later, Dominica lost out to Puerto Rico and Venezuela, finishing third in Pool D, with Machado slashing .235/.278/.647 and starting all 4 games. Dominica reached the semifinal in 2026, eventually losing to the US. Machado batted .300/.481/.351 over 6 games.

Though born in Florida, Machado decided to play for the Dominican Republic because of his strong family heritage, including his grandfather who grew up in La Vega, Dominican Republic. He expressed his decision as:

"There was no way I could pass on representing the Dominican Republic in the WBC. It's in my blood. I'm doing it for my mother. I'm doing it for my uncle. I'm doing it for everybody who has supported me in my career.

And most of all, I'm doing it for my grandfather.

Honestly, if he were here to watch me play in the WBC, I don't think he would have any words to describe how it would make him feel. Which would be O.K., because whether he's here or not, the only word that will matter when I put that jersey on will be the country on the front: Dominicana."

== Scouting report ==
Keith Law, a writer for ESPN.com and the lead baseball analyst for Scouts, Inc., said in 2010 that if Machado stayed at shortstop, "you have a potential All-Star offensively who is no worse than average with the glove". In the middle of his first full MLB season (2013), Fangraphs evaluated Machado as the best third baseman in baseball, by a wide margin. Machado has been compared to New York Yankees third baseman, Alex Rodriguez, whom he considers his mentor. Machado said "it's a great honor" to be compared to Rodriguez, but he doesn't compare himself to anyone. Orioles Hall of Famer Jim Palmer compared Machado to another large-framed shortstop/third baseman: "He reminds me of how I think Cal (Ripken) would have been if he had played third base his entire career."

== Personal life ==
In November 2014, Machado married his longtime girlfriend, Yainee Alonso, the sister of Yonder Alonso. In the offseason, they reside in Coral Gables, Florida, and own two homes there. During the season, he resides in Coronado, California. He has a dog named Kobe, as he was a huge fan of basketball player Kobe Bryant while growing up.

Machado's agent is Dan Lozano. He was represented by Scott Boras at the start of his career.

Machado is part of the ownership group for San Diego FC, an expansion team in Major League Soccer that was announced in 2023 and began play in 2025.

== See also ==
- List of Baltimore Orioles awards
- List of baseball players who have represented more than one nation
- List of largest sports contracts
- List of Major League Baseball annual doubles leaders
- List of Major League Baseball career assists as a third baseman leaders
- List of Major League Baseball career home run leaders
- List of Major League Baseball career hits leaders
- List of Major League Baseball career runs batted in leaders
- List of Major League Baseball career runs scored leaders
- List of Major League Baseball career strikeouts by batters leaders
- List of people from Miami
