= Saint-Lambert =

Saint-Lambert may refer to:

== People ==
- Saint Lambert of Maastricht, bishop in the 7th century and Christian saint
- Saint Lambert of Lyon, bishop in the 7th century and Christian saint
- Saint Lambert of Vence, bishop in the 12th century and Christian saint
- Jean François de Saint-Lambert, a French poet

== Churches ==
=== Germany ===
- St. Lambert's Church, Bergen
- St. Lambert's Church, Coesfeld
- St. Lamberti, Hildesheim
- St. Lamberti Church, Oldenburg

=== Netherlands ===
- Sint-Lambertuskerk (Maastricht)

== Places ==
=== Belgium ===
- Place Saint-Lambert, a square in the centre of Liège
- Woluwe-Saint-Lambert, a municipality in the Brussels-Capital Region
- Lasne-Chapelle-Saint-Lambert a division of the municipality Lasne which contains the church of Saint Lambert

=== Canada ===
- Saint-Lambert, Montérégie, a city in Quebec
- Saint-Lambert (electoral district)
- Saint-Lambert station, a railway station in Saint-Lambert, Quebec
- St. Lambert Elementary School, a school in Saint-Lambert, Quebec
- Champlain College Saint-Lambert, a campus in Saint-Lambert, Quebec
- Saint-Lambert, Abitibi-Témiscamingue, a municipality in Quebec
- Saint-Lambert-de-Lauzon, a parish in Quebec
- Saint-Lambert-de-Lauzon Aerodrome, an aerodrome in Saint-Lambert-de-Lauzon, Quebec
- St. Lambert High School, alternate name of Chambly Academy in Saint-Lambert, Quebec

=== France ===
- Saint-Lambert, Calvados, in the Calvados département
- Saint-Lambert, Yvelines, in the Yvelines département
- Saint-Lambert-du-Lattay, in the Maine-et-Loire département
- Saint-Lambert-et-Mont-de-Jeux, in the Ardennes département
- Saint-Lambert-la-Potherie, in the Maine-et-Loire département
- Saint-Lambert-sur-Dive, in the Orne département
- Autréville-Saint-Lambert, in the Meuse département
- Canton of Marseille - Saint-Lambert, in the Bouches-du-Rhône département

== Miscellaneous ==
- Val Saint Lambert, a Belgian crystal glassware manufacturer founded in 1826
