= Préville, Quebec =

Neighbourhood in Saint-Lambert, Quebec

Coordinates: 45°29′N 73°30′W

Préville
- Former town
- Interactive map of Préville
- Country: Canada
- Province: Quebec
- Region: Montérégie
- RCM: None
- Agglomeration: Longueuil
- Founded: March 11, 1948
- Time zone: UTC−5 (EST)
  - Summer (DST): UTC−4 (EDT)
- Area codes: 450 and 579, previously 514
- Annexed by Saint-Lambert, Quebec: May 3, 1969

Préville (French pronunciation: [pʁevil]) is a neighbourhood in Saint-Lambert, Quebec. Excised from part of the Cité de Jacques-Cartier's territory on March 11, 1948, Préville existed as a city in its own right until it was absorbed into Saint-Lambert in 1969.

Préville is located in the westernmost part of Saint-Lambert and the neighbourhood is separated from the rest of the city by the Country Club of Montreal golf club. Préville was built up primarily in the period following World War II.

== History ==
Arguing that the physical separation of Preville from Jacques-Cartier was "an anomaly", Preville Ltd and the Country Club of Montreal successfully convinced the provincial government to incorporate the town of Preville. Preville Ltd and the Country Club of Montreal owned the land which they had been subdividing, developing and selling off.

In 1969, Preville was merged into Saint-Lambert, Quebec. A relationship already existed between the two communities as Saint-Lambert provided fire fighting services for both cities though Préville had its own police. The city hall of Préville, including the police station, was located at 50 de Bretagne street. Nothing at all remains of this city hall that has long been razed and whose site is now a park called de Bretagne.

== Street names ==
Préville's streets are named after provinces of France; the concept originated from Préville itself, when it was a city, and has since been maintained by Saint-Lambert for newer streets built in the neighbourhood.

The only streets that are not named after French provinces are the neighborhood's four main streets: Simard, Victoria, Queen and Riverside. As is the case with neighbouring Greenfield Park, the portion of Victoria Avenue in Préville was called Devonshire Road until 1968.

== Education ==
École Préville, administered by the Commission Scolaire Marie-Victorin, provides French-language primary education. Preville School was built in 1958-59 under the aegis of the Chambly County Protestant School Board and operated for many years with classes only in English for grades 1 to 9.

Since July 1, 1998, English-language education has been the responsibility of the Riverside School Board. There is no longer an English-language school in Preville. English primary students (Kindergarten-Grade 6) attend Saint-Lambert Elementary, on Green Street. High school students (Secondary 1 through 5) attend Chambly Academy (Formerly Chambly County High School), in Saint-Lambert. The South Shore Protestant Regional School Board had previously served the municipality.
