= Lambert =

Lambert may refer to

== People ==
- Lambert (name), a given name and surname
  - Lambert (surname), a list of people with the surname
- Lambert, Bishop of Ostia (c. 1036–1130), became Pope Honorius II
- Lambert, Margrave of Tuscany (fl. 929–931), also count and duke of Lucca
- Lambert (pianist), stage-name of German pianist and composer Paul Lambert

== Places ==
=== United States ===
- Lambert, Michigan, an unincorporated community
- Lambert, Mississippi, a town in Quitman County, Mississippi
- Lambert, Missouri, an inactive village in Scott County, Missouri
- St. Louis Lambert International Airport, an international airport in St. Louis, Missouri
- Lambert, Montana, a rural town in Montana
- Lambert, Oklahoma, a town in Alfalfa County, Oklahoma
- Lambert Township, Red Lake County, Minnesota
- Lambert Castle, a mansion in Paterson, New Jersey
- Lambert Creek, a tributary in San Mateo County, California
- Lambert High School, a public high school in Forsyth County, Georgia

=== Elsewhere ===
- Lambert Gravitational Centre, the geographical centre of Australia
- Lambert (lunar crater), named after Johann Heinrich Lambert
- Lambert (Martian crater), named after Johann Heinrich Lambert

== Transportation ==
- Lambert (automobile), a defunct American automobile brand
- Lambert (cyclecar), British three-wheeled cyclecar
- Lambert, one of the GWR 3031 Class locomotives that were built for and run on the Great Western Railway between 1891 and 1915, formerly named Trafalgar before 1901

== Other uses ==
- Lambert (unit), a non-SI unit of luminance named after Johann Heinrich Lambert
- Lambert (grape), another name for the German/Italian wine grape Trollinger
- Lambert v. California, court case regarding legal notice
- Lambert W function, mathematical definition of a product log named after Johann Heinrich Lambert
- Lambert the Sheepish Lion, a 1952 Disney animated short film directed by Jack Hannah

== See also ==
- Foot-lambert, an American customary unit of luminance named after Johann Heinrich Lambert
- Lambert projection (disambiguation), a series of geographic map projections named after Johann Heinrich Lambert
- Saint-Lambert (disambiguation)
- Lambrecht (disambiguation)
