= St. John's School (Quebec) =

St. Johns School

Location
- 380 St. Michel; Saint-Jean-sur-Richelieu, Quebec, J3B 1T4; Canada; 45.3150°N 73.2696°W

Information
- School type: English Primary School, Secondary School
- Motto: Labor Omnia Vincit
- School board: Riverside School Board
- Principal: Jean-Simon Poirier
- Grades: Kindergarten to Grade 11
- Enrollment: 850
- Language: English
- Area: Montérégie: Saint-Jean-sur-Richelieu, Iberville, St-Luc, Lacolle, Sainte-Anne-De-Sabrevois and nearby rural areas.
- Colours: Blue and Gold
- Team name: St-John's Knights
- Website: www.stjohns.rsb.qc.ca

St. John's School is a public English primary and secondary school located in Saint-Jean-sur-Richelieu, Quebec, Canada.

== History ==
In the politically charged atmosphere of Quebec's Bill 101 debate, the school was the target of an arson attack during the 1988 winter break. The fire burned the main office and postponed school restarting in the 1989 new year.

In 1991, the school's athletic program adopted the team name St John's Knights, an allusion to the Knights of St John.

== See also ==
- Saint-Jean-sur-Richelieu
- Riverside School Board
- Heritage Regional High School
- Centennial Regional High School
