= Don MacIver =

Canadian ice hockey player (born 1955)

- Born: May 3, 1955 (age 71) Montreal, Quebec, Canada
- Height: 6 ft 0 in (183 cm)
- Weight: 200 lb (91 kg; 14 st 4 lb)
- Position: Defence
- Shot: Left
- Played for: Winnipeg Jets
- NHL draft: Undrafted
- Playing career: 1979–1983

Donald Neil MacIver (born May 3, 1955 in Montreal, Quebec) is a Canadian retired professional ice hockey defenceman who played 6 games in the National Hockey League with the Winnipeg Jets during the 1979–80 season.

== Playing career ==
MacIver played junior hockey in St. Lambert, Quebec with the Junior "B" St. Lambert Lions and the Junior "A" Rebelles de Longueuil. He played college hockey with the Saint Mary's University Huskies in Halifax, Nova Scotia, and was an AUAA all-star and collegiate Most Valuable Player in his senior year. After graduation from Saint Mary's, he signed a professional contract with the Jets for three years (1979–1982) and one year with the New York Rangers after that. Except for the six games that he played with Winnipeg, MacIver spent his professional career with the Tulsa Oilers of the Central Hockey League. After hanging up the skates professionally, he attended the University of Tulsa and then Oklahoma State University College of Health Sciences, and as of 2021, he was an anesthesiologist in Tulsa, Oklahoma.

MacIver was a 1972 graduate of Chambly County High School in St. Lambert, Quebec.

== Career statistics ==
=== Regular season and playoffs ===
			Regular season					Playoffs
Season	Team	League	GP	G	A	Pts	PIM	GP	G	A	Pts	PIM
1976–77	Saint Mary's University	CIAU	7	0	3	3	6	—	—	—	—	—
1977–78	Saint Mary's University	CIAU	16	1	9	10	19	—	—	—	—	—
1978–79	Saint Mary's University	CIAU	20	3	11	14	43	—	—	—	—	—
1979–80	Winnipeg Jets	NHL	6	0	0	0	2	-	-	-	-	-
1979–80	Tulsa Oilers	CHL	56	3	12	15	98	3	0	0	0	6
1980–81	Tulsa Oilers	CHL	72	3	9	12	155	8	0	1	1	16
1981–82	Tulsa Oilers	CHL	66	2	22	24	166	2	0	0	0	0
1982–83	Tulsa Oilers	CHL	77	3	9	12	113	—	—	—	—	—
CHL totals			271	11	52	63	532	13	0	1	1	22
NHL totals			6	0	0	0	2	—	—	—	—	—
