= Greenfield Park Primary International School =

- École internationale primaire de Greenfield Park

Location
- 776 Campbell; Greenfield Park (Longueuil), Quebec, J4V 1Y7; Canada; 45°28′58″N 73°28′16″W

Information
- School type: International Baccalaureate, French Immersion Elementary School
- Motto: Je prends conscience et je m'engage. (I commit myself to action)
- Founded: 1994 (opened)
- School board: Riverside School Board and Commission Scolaire Marie-Victorin
- Principal: Julie Ruel
- Grades: Grade 1 to Grade 6
- Enrollment: 600
- Language: English and French
- Area: South Shore (Montreal): Greenfield Park, Brossard.
- Colours: White and Green
- Team name: The Huskies
- Website: www.gpi.rsb.qc.ca

Greenfield Park Primary International School (French: École internationale primaire de Greenfield Park) is an elementary school located in Greenfield Park, Quebec, Canada. It is a bilingual institution operated by the Riverside School Board and the Commission Scolaire Marie-Victorin. The school has been certified by the International Baccalaureate Organization since 2002.

The building itself, located on Campbell street in Greenfield Park used to be called Jubilee since its opening in 1957 until its closure in June 1998. The school re-opened in September 1998 as the "International School", under the Commission Scolaire Marie Victorin.

== Asbestos problem ==
In December 2007, asbestos dust was found in the air. Some areas of the school were cordoned off in order to treat this problem.
