= St. Lambert Elementary School =

Location
- 81 Rue Green; Saint-Lambert, Quebec, J4P 1S4; Canada; 45.5024°N 73.5100°W

Information
- School type: Public School
- School board: Riverside School Board
- Principal: Véronique Frenette
- Staff: Laura Pescolla VP
- Grades: Kindergarten- Grade 6
- Enrollment: 550
- Language: English, French Immersion
- Website: www.stlambert.rsb.qc.ca

St. Lambert Elementary School is an elementary school belonging to the Riverside School Board. The School is located in Saint-Lambert, Quebec, Canada and is the only English-language elementary school that serves the city of Saint-Lambert. The school is composed of three main floors. There are four classes in each level, two in the French immersion program and two in the English program.

== History ==
Saint-Lambert Elementary began in 1875 as a one-room school building that was created in Saint-Lambert as a model school. Size increases due to enrollment and changes in the laws concerning education in the province of Quebec changed the school several times over its lifetime. In 1896, the current building was built at the cost of 3000 dollars. At this point the name of the school was changed from "Model School" to Saint-Lambert Academy.

The building was once again extended in 1921 at the cost of 225 thousand dollars, and included two new wings to the original building, along with a gym and 10 classrooms. At this point the School's name was changed from Saint-Lambert Academy to Saint-Lambert High School.

The school's name underwent another change in 1954, when the elementary and high school levels were split into different buildings, and Chambly County High School was created, at which point Saint-Lambert Elementary became the official and current name of the building.

Different services have been offered at the school from time to time, one of which is the after school daycare service that is offered. Providing supersvision for children before and after the school day, the Daycare was started in 1985.

Prior to 1998, St. Lambert Elementary was predominantly a French-language school. Four local English-language elementary schools were closed, and merged into St. Lambert Elementary. After the 1999-2000 school year, all of its francophone sector elementary school students were transferred to other Commission Scolaire Marie-Victorin French-language schools.

=== Margaret Pendlebury ===
In 1998-1999, Margaret Pendlebury Elementary School which was also located in St. Lambert closed and all of its 250 students were moved to St. Lambert Elementary. When a group of parents wanted their kids to be bilingual in 1965, Margaret Pendlebury Elementary became the first school to offer French immersion in Canada. By the mid 1970s French immersion ended at Margaret Pendlebury but St. Lambert Elementary School offered it. French immersion exists in every Canadian province and territory except Nunavut.

=== St. Francis of Assisi ===
In 1999-2000, St. Francis of Assisi Elementary School closed, another St. Lambert school, and most of its 150 students were transferred to St. Lambert Elementary.

=== Preville Elementary ===
Also in 1999-2000, Preville Elementary of St. Lambert's Preville district became a French-only school, meaning its Anglophone students were sent to St. Lambert Elementary or Harold Napper Elementary School in nearby Brossard.

=== St. Lawrence Elementary ===
In the 2000-2001 school year, St. Lawrence Elementary school in nearby Brossard closed, and most students and staff were relocated to St. Lambert Elementary.

== See also ==
- Saint-Lambert, Quebec
- Chambly Academy
- Riverside School Board
