= Miriam Burland =

Canadian astronomer

- Miriam Burland, from a 1941 publication.
- Born: 1902; Montreal
- Died: April 1, 1996 (aged 93–94); Ottawa
- Occupation: astronomer
- Known for: first woman on staff at Dominion Observatory
- Notable work: studied meteors, Cepheid variables, eclipses

Miriam Seymour Burland (1902 – April 1, 1996) was a Canadian astronomer. She was the first woman on staff at the Dominion Observatory, when she joined the Astrophysics Division in 1927.

== Early life ==
Miriam Seymour Burland was born in Montreal, the daughter of Benjamin Burland and Bertha Belasco Burland. Her mother was active in the social life of Saint-Lambert, as founder of the town's Tuesday Musical Club and the Christmas Tree League. Miriam Burland attended Longueuil High School in Montreal, and studied mathematics and physics at McGill University, where she was also an avid ice hockey player. She trained as an astronomer at McGill, under Vibert Douglas.

== Career ==
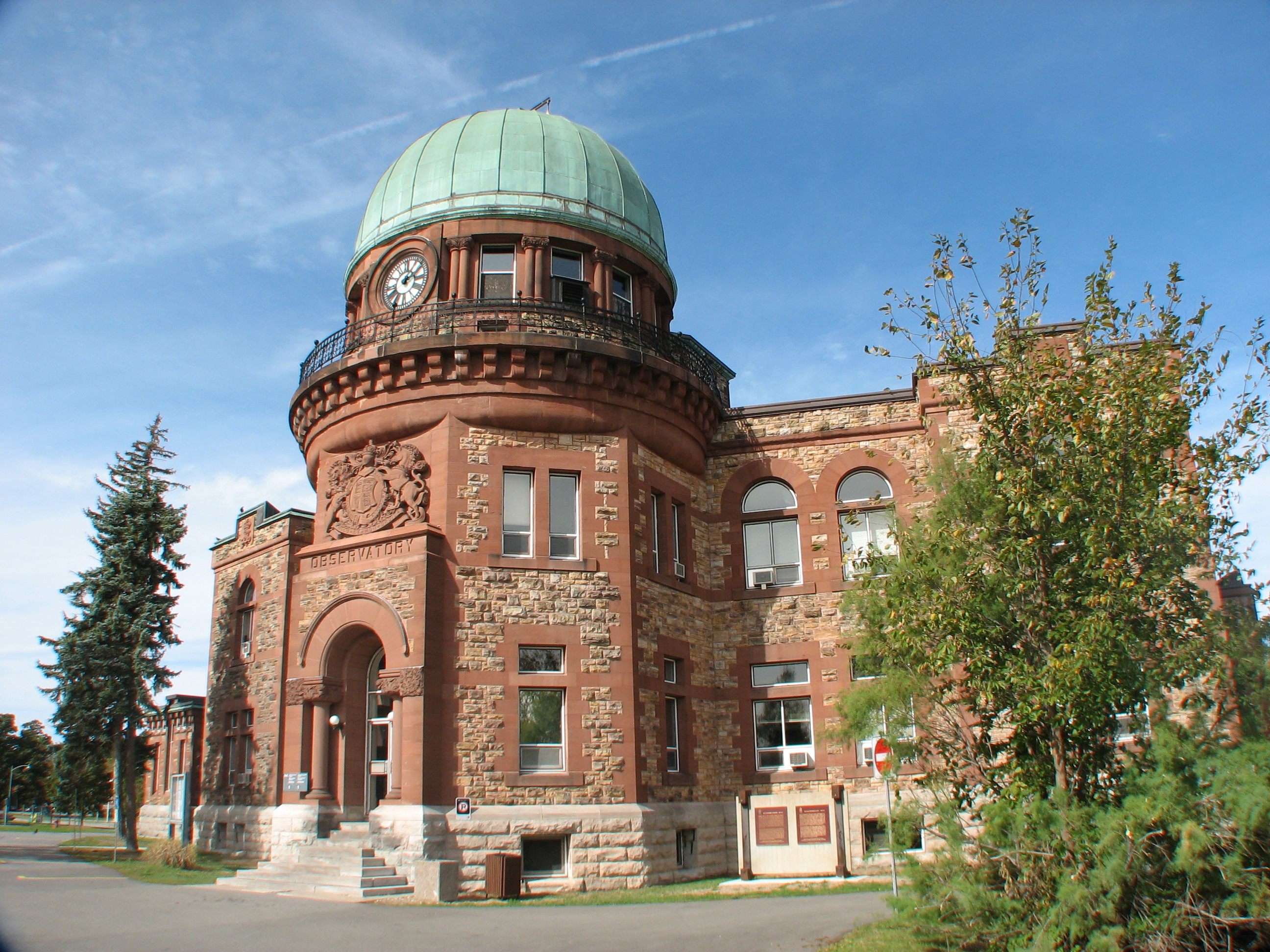
The Dominion Observatory building, where Burland spent her career as an astronomer.

Burland joined the Astrophysics Division at the Dominion Observatory in 1927, and was the first woman on staff at the Observatory. In the 1930s she served in leadership positions at the Ottawa Centre of the Royal Astronomical Society of Canada (RASC), including a term as president. She worked on photoelectric photometry of Cepheid variables, and later studied meteors. She was on three teams of scientists observing major solar eclipses in Canada, in 1932, 1954, and 1962.

From the mid-1950s, still the only woman astrophysicist on staff, she served as the observatory's education and information liaison, compiling reports, arranging public tours, and answering inquiries. She and Peter Millman coordinated a meteor observation program in Canada for the International Geophysical Year (1957-1958). In 1960, she was among the observatory's representatives at the opening of the Dominion Radio Astrophysical Observatory in British Columbia. In the 1960s, she served on the National Committee for Canada in the International Astronomical Union. She was a regular contributor to the Journal of the Royal Astronomical Society of Canada. She was received the RASC's Service Award in 1963. "I know there are five PhDs who became scientists because of visits to the Observatory and my interest in their careers," she noted on the occasion of her retirement from the Dominion Observatory in 1967.

== Publications ==
Publications by Burland included "Combined Radar, Photographic and Visual Observations of the Perseid Meteor Shower of 1947" (Nature 1948, with Peter Millman and D. W. R. McKinley), and "Wave Lengths, Equivalent Widths, and Line Profiles in the Spectrum of the Star H. D. 190073" (Canadian Journal of Research 1949, with C. S. Beals).

== Personal life ==
Miriam Seymour Burland was active in the Zonta Club in Ottawa, and served as its president in 1941. She died in 1996, aged 93 years, in Ottawa.
