= Country Club of Montreal =

Golf course in Quebec, Canada

- Location within Greater Montreal
- 45°29′10″N 73°30′25″W

Club information
- Location: Saint-Lambert, Quebec, Canada
- Established: November 17, 1910
- Type: Private
- Tota holes: 18
- Website: countryclubmontreal.com
- Designed by: Roy Dye of Pete Dye and Associates
- Par: 72
- Length: 6690 yards
- Course rating: 71.6

The Country Club of Montreal (French: Le Country club de Montréal) is a private 18-hole golf course located in Saint-Lambert, Quebec, Canada. Originally dedicated to polo, the club's vocation changed to golf on November 17, 1910, making it the second oldest golf course in Greater Montreal. Originally a 9-hole golf course, 9 more holes were added in subsequent years, and in 1974, the course was redesigned and modernized by Roy Dye of Pete Dye and Associates.

The course is 6,725 yards for a par of 72, and features a course rating of 72.8 and a slope rating of 135.

== History ==
Golf was first played on this land in 1903, when owner Georges-Aimé Simard leased the land to a polo club and the Victoria Golf Country Club. This first country club dissolved in 1908, and Simard sold the land to the Country Club, then known as Ranelagh Golf Links, in 1911. The Montreal and Southern Counties Railway was soon extended down to Ranelagh to transport golfers to and from the city.

It is believed that the term "mulligan" in golf may originate from the Country Club. One account says that local businessman David Mulligan would drive friends to the Country Club for a game, and in gratitude they would let him try again if he would miss a shot. The Country Club has erected a plaque to memorialize it as the birthplace of the "mulligan".

The Country Club was involved in the development of land to its west, along with Preville Ltd. In 1948 they successfully petitioned the Government of Quebec to have Préville incorporated as a town.

== See also ==
- List of golf courses in Quebec
