= Saint-Lambert, Montérégie =

Saint-Lambert
- City
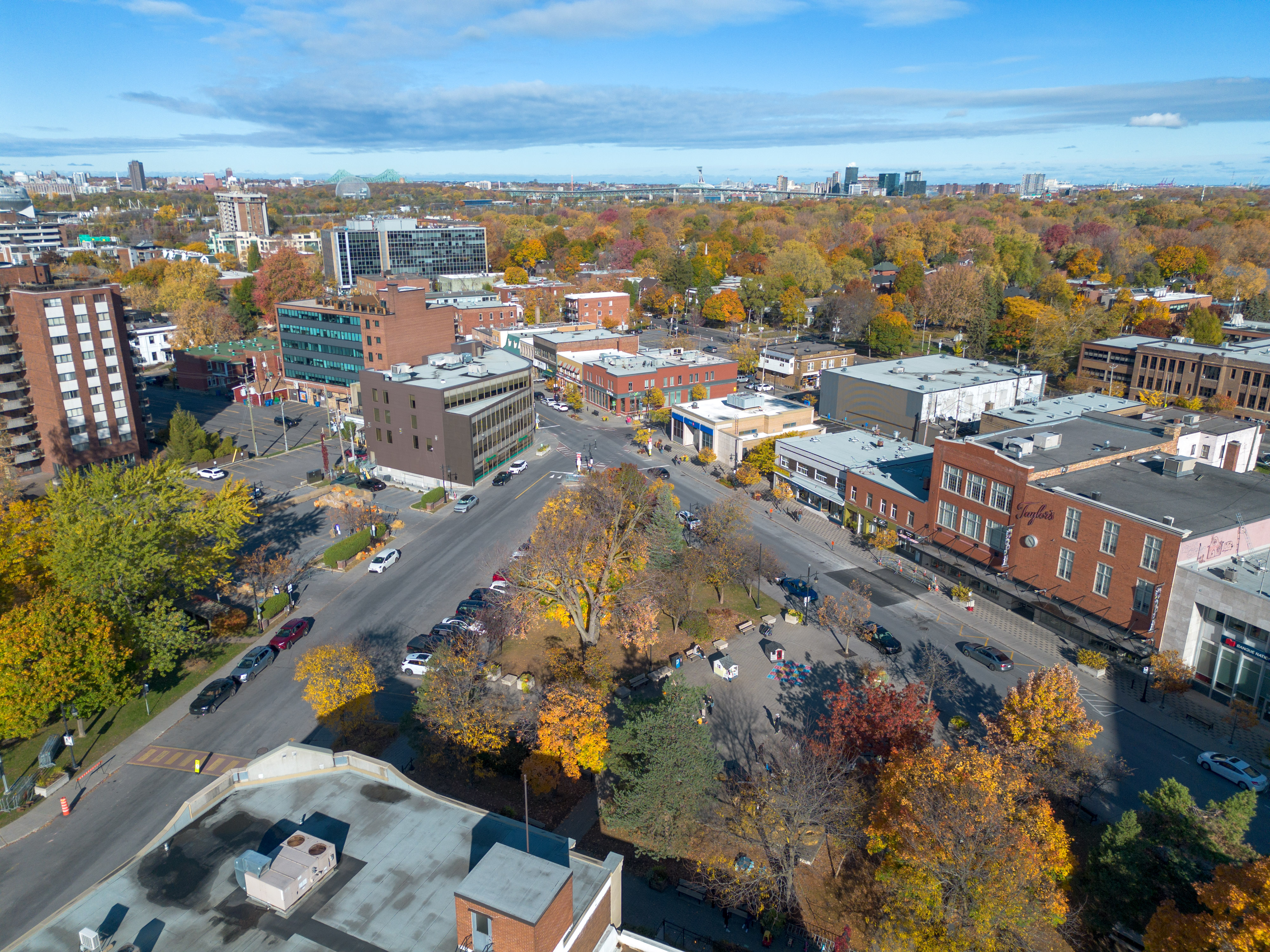
- Downtown Saint-Lambert in 2025

- Flag Coat of arms
- Motto: Maximus in Minimus (Latin for "The greatest in the smallest detail.")
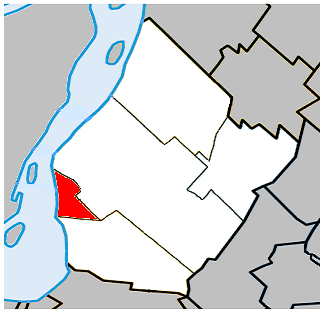
- Location within the Urban Agglomeration of Longueuil

- Location in southern Quebec
- Coordinates: 45°30′N 73°31′W
- Country: Canada
- Province: Quebec
- Region: Montérégie
- RCM: None
- Agglomeration: Longueuil
- Founded: 1857
- Re-constituted: January 1, 2006

Government
  - Mayor: Loïc Blancquaert
  - Federal riding: Brossard—Saint-Lambert
  - Prov. riding: Laporte

Area
  - Total: 10.10 km^{2} (3.90 sq mi)
  - Land: 7.59 km^{2} (2.93 sq mi)

Population (2016)
  - Total: 21,861
  - Density: 2,880.6/km^{2} (7,461/sq mi)
  - Dwellings: 10,419
- Time zone: UTC−05:00 (EST)
  - Summer (DST): UTC−04:00 (EDT)
- Postal code(s): J4P, J4R, J4S
- Area codes: 450 and 579
- Highways A-20: R-112; R-132; R-134
- Website: www.saint-lambert.ca/en

Saint-Lambert (/- ˈlæmbərt/ - LAM-bərt, French pronunciation: [sɛ̃ lɑ̃bɛʁ], locally [sɛ̃ lɑ̃baɛ̯ʁ]) is a city (French: ville) in southwestern Quebec, Canada, located on the south shore of the St. Lawrence River, opposite Montreal. It is part of the Urban agglomeration of Longueuil of the Montérégie administrative region.

Saint-Lambert is divided into two main sections: the original city of Saint-Lambert and the Préville neighbourhood. The original city of Saint-Lambert (as it existed prior to 1969) is located from the Country Club of Montreal golf course to the border of the Le Vieux-Longueuil borough. It includes the city's downtown, known as "The Village". On the other side of the Country Club of Montreal is the former city of Préville, which merged with Saint-Lambert in 1969. It extends to the borders of the city of Brossard and the Longueuil borough of Greenfield Park.

Saint-Lambert was named for the early French Canadian hunter Lambert Closse.

== History ==
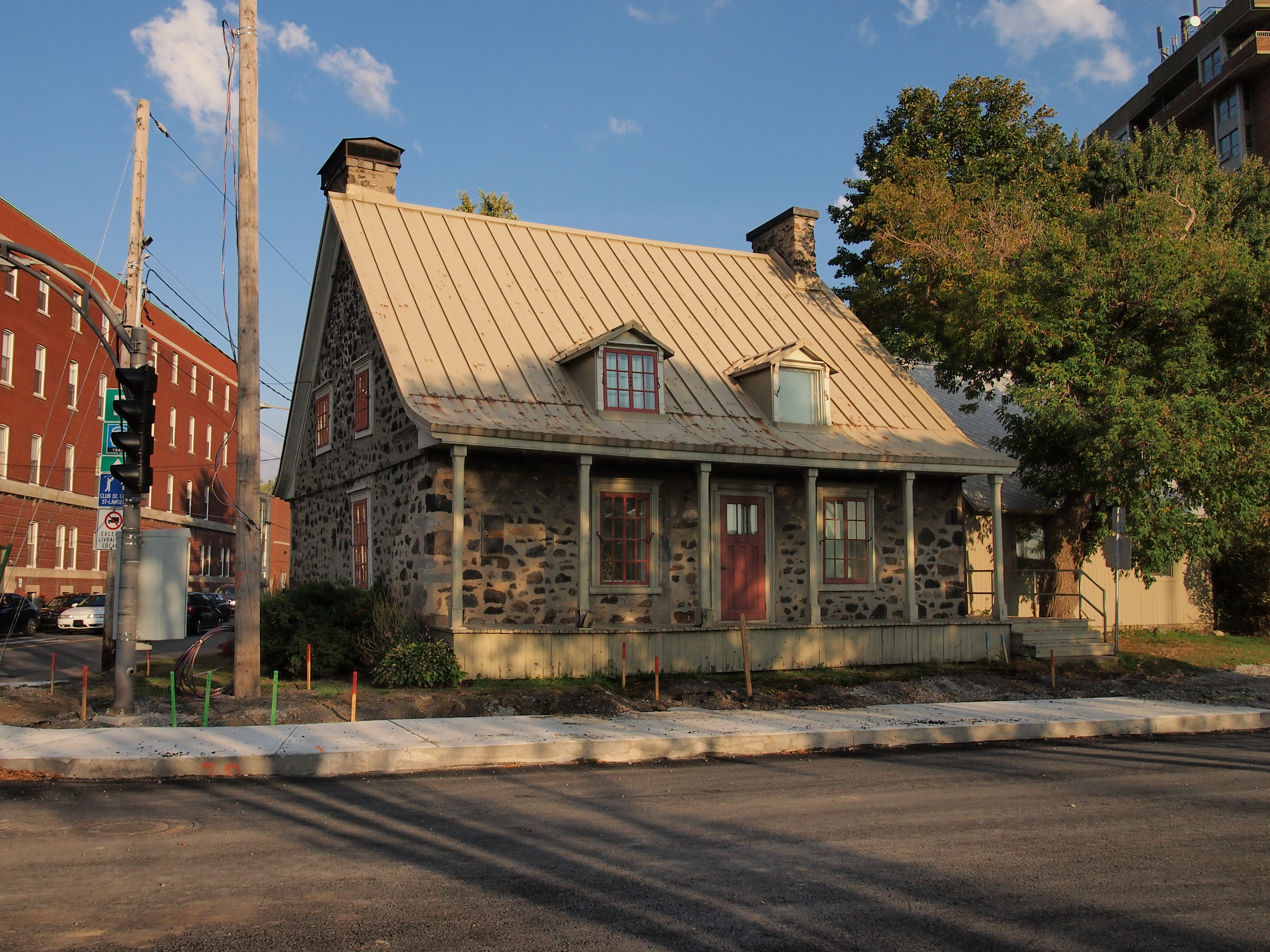
The Marsil House, built in 1750, is one of the oldest buildings in Saint-Lambert.

In 1636, King Louis XIII was dividing up seigneuries in the new colony of New France. One of these was known as La Prairie, comprising La Prairie de la Magdeleine and La Prairie de Saint-Lambert. The lower part of the latter, was known as Mouillepied, due to the swampy conditions of the area. Saint-Lambert's first two permanent residents were André Marsil and André Achim in the 18th century. Today André Marsil's house can be found on the corner of Riverside Drive and Notre-Dame Avenue, was converted into a textile museum called the Marsil Museum (French: Musée Marsil), although the museum has since moved to the Bonsecours Market.

In 1722, Mouillepied was transferred from La Prairie seigneurie to Saint-Antoine-de-Longueuil parish.

Following the establishment of the railway in 1852 and the completion of the Victoria Bridge in 1859, the village received a permanent link to the island of Montreal. The Victoria Bridge is the oldest bridge linking Montreal to the South Shore, and carried the first rail line linking Quebec's largest city to New York City. Because of this, Saint-Lambert became an important passenger and freight stop for a long period of time. This is evident in the city's architecture, in which many old industrial buildings are found near the railway tracks. Many of these have since been converted into lofts such as the former Waterman pens factory, originally built in 1908.

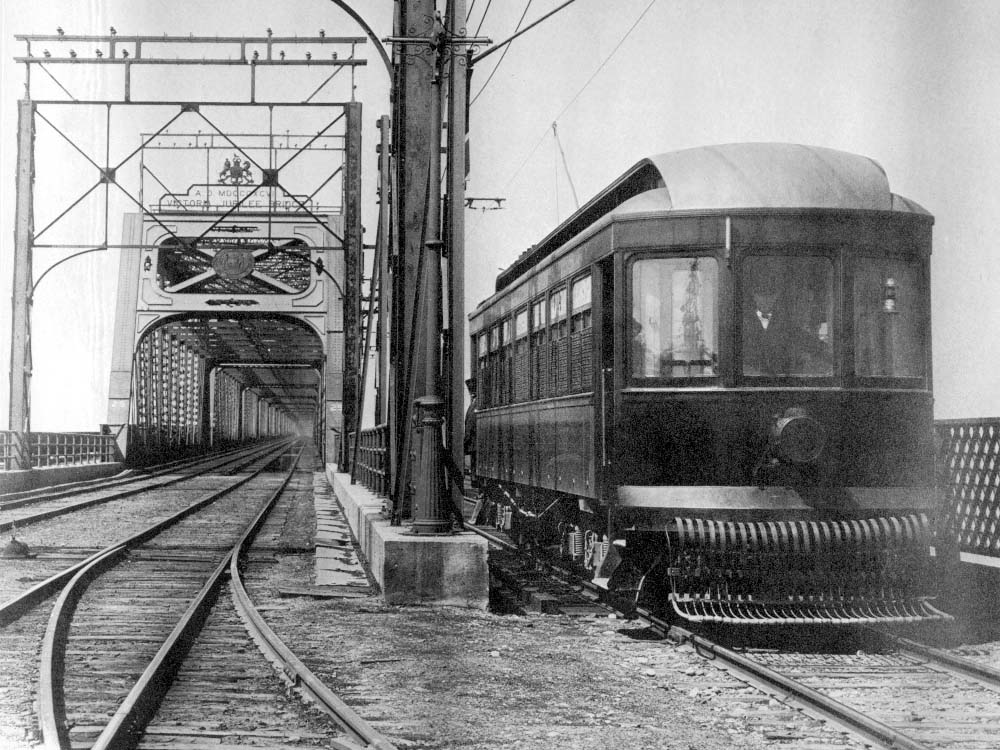
First streetcar arriving in Saint-Lambert from the Victoria Bridge in 1909.

With the bridge and railway came a quick growth in Saint-Lambert's population and the construction of new housing. Saint-Lambert detached itself from Saint-Antoine-de-Longueuil and achieved municipality status in 1857, under its first mayor, Louis Bétournay. At the time, Saint-Lambert did not include Mouillepied, which instead had remained in Saint-Antoine-de-Longueuil.

In 1892, Saint-Lambert reached village status, attained town status in 1898 and city status in 1921.

During World War I and World War II, Saint-Lambert had one of the highest military enlistment rates in Canada. The small city lost a total of 132 soldiers in both wars. This number was a significant portion of the young people at the time.

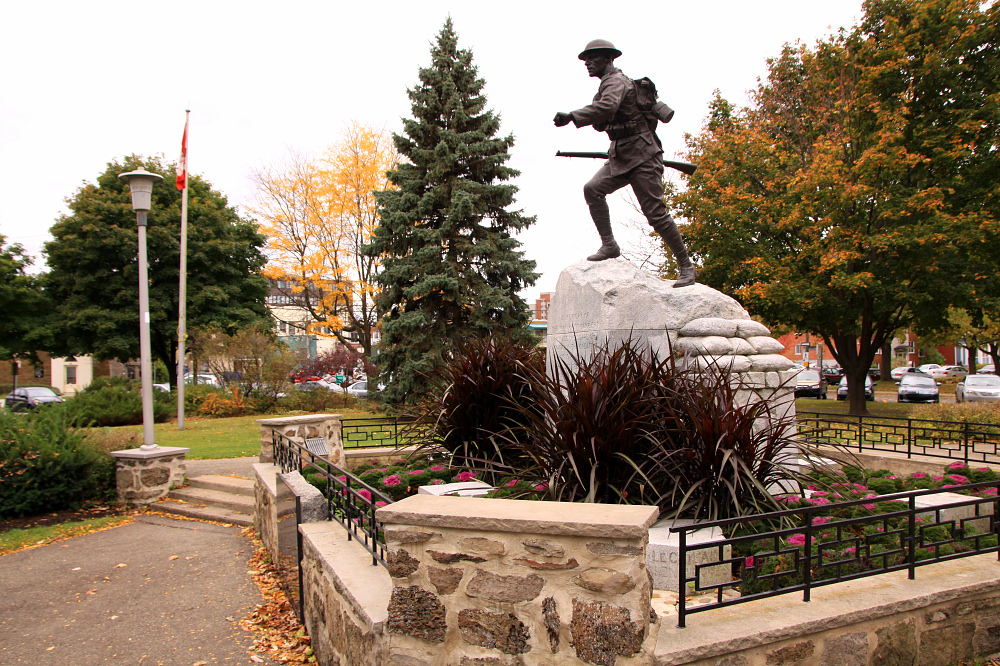
The Saint-Lambert Cenotaph by sculptor Emanuel Hahn was inaugurated on July 9, 1922, by General Arthur Currie.

In the 1950s, the development of Saint-Lambert was enhanced with the building of the St. Lambert Locks in the St. Lawrence Seaway, to bypass the smaller Lachine Canal, and this became the most easterly lock in the Seaway. Suburban growth from Montreal in this period also affected Saint-Lambert, as well as many of the older communities on the South Shore.

Since its establishment, the city's limits have barely changed. In 1948, the old Mouillepied area of the town of Jacques-Cartier was split off and erected into the town of Préville. It merged with Saint-Lambert in 1969.

Saint-Lambert had an anglophone majority population starting in 1881, and throughout most of the 20th century. Saint-Lambert had 12,460 anglophones and was 61% anglophone as recently as the 1981 census. This started to change, as it increasingly become the home to upper class francophone families, in the 1970s, 80s and 90s.

The late 1990s saw the construction of a new residential neighbourhood in Saint-Lambert, known as "Le Haut Saint-Lambert". It was built on the remaining vacant land in city limits near LeMoyne.

In 2007, the city of Saint-Lambert celebrated its 150th anniversary.

Amalgamation and de-amalgamation

On January 1, 2002, municipal reorganization merged Saint-Lambert with LeMoyne to form a borough in the new Longueuil mega-city. There was a strong "de-merger" movement and a referendum was won on June 20, 2004, to re-establish the former city. The city was officially reborn (excluding LeMoyne, which remained with Longueuil) on January 1, 2006, while on January 7, 2006, the Saint-Lambert flag was hoisted in front of city hall and the mayor, councillors and city manager took their oath of office.

== Geography ==
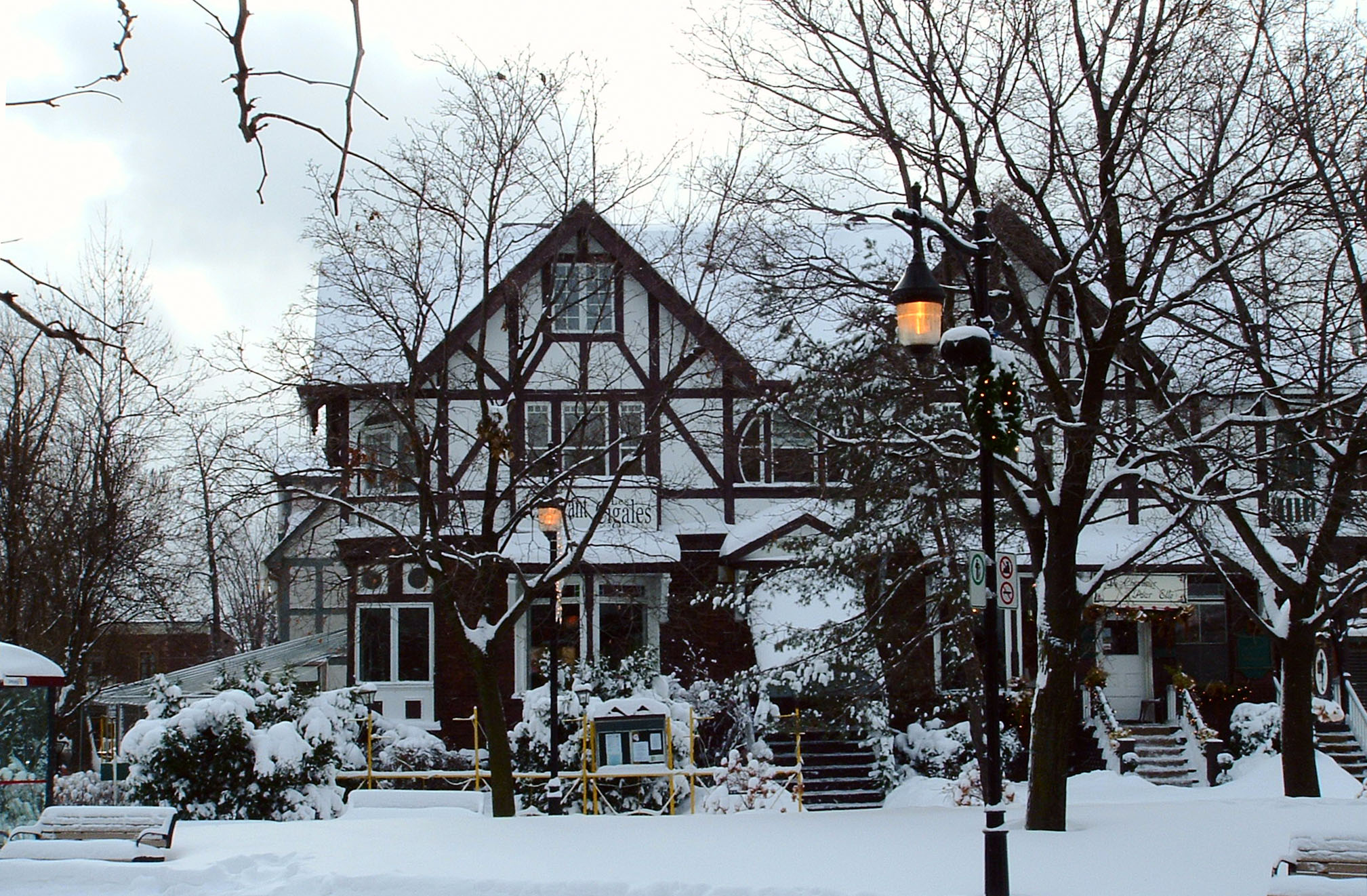
A Neo-Tudor house, turned restaurant, in Saint-Lambert's village during winter.

Saint-Lambert is underlain by Ordovician period black shale. This bedrock is covered by deep clay drift over most of the town. Soils were poorly drained in their natural state; as such, they were classified as gleysols—strongly acidic (Longueuil series) under most of the town and neutral to mildly alkaline (Boucherville series) in part of the western section (Préville). Drainage and excavation have been used to adapt the soil for housing construction.

The most common trees in Saint-Lambert are those species which tolerate poor drainage. These include poplars, willows, red maple, silver maple and green ash. The American elm was formerly abundant but its population has been severely reduced by Dutch elm disease. Non-native species are commonly represented by Norway maple, silver birch, English oak, blue spruce, common horsechestnut and honey locust. Rare exotics which benefit from St-Lambert's favorable microclimate include Japanese maple and tulip tree. Most trees in Saint-Lambert show some evidence of damage from an ice storm in January 1998 and a severe thunderstorm in June 2008.

=== Climate ===
The climate of Saint-Lambert is characterized by abundant precipitation and one of the longest, warmest growing seasons in Quebec. As in other parts of Greater Montreal, lengthy spells of hot humid weather are common in summer, and thunderstorms frequently occur. Heavy snow is usual in winter and several damaging ice storms have occurred over the town's history.

== Demographics ==
Historical populations
Year	Pop.	±%
1861	350	—
1871	327	−6.6%
1881	332	+1.5%
1891	906	+172.9%
1901	1,362	+50.3%
1911	3,334	+144.8%
1921	3,890	+16.7%
1931	6,075	+56.2%
1941	6,417	+5.6%
1951	8,719	+35.9%
1961	15,532	+78.1%
1971	18,616	+19.9%
1981	20,557	+10.4%
1991	20,976	+2.0%
1996	20,971	−0.0%
2001	21,051	+0.4%
2006	21,599	+2.6%
2011	21,555	−0.2%
2016	21,861	+1.4%

In the 2021 Census of Population conducted by Statistics Canada, Saint-Lambert had a population of 22,761 living in 10,552 of its 11,058 total private dwellings, a change of 4.1% from its 2016 population of 21,861. With a land area of 7.56 km^{2} (2.92 sq mi), it had a population density of 3,010.7/km^{2} (7,797.7/sq mi) in 2021.

Linguistically, as of the census of 2021, 71.3% of the population were native speakers of French, 11.2% English, 3.6% Spanish, 1.5% Arabic, 0.7% Romanian, 0.6% Italian, 0.6% Portuguese, 0.5% Mandarin, 0.5% Russian, 0.5% Iranian Persian, 0.4% German, 2.9% both English and French, 1.0% French and a non-official language, 0.5% English and a non-official language, and 0.3% English, French and a non-official language.

In the city the population was spread out, with 15.1% under the age of 15, 9.8% from 15 to 24, 19.6% from 25 to 44, 29.2% from 45 to 64, and 26.3% who were 65 years of age or older. The median age was 48.5 years. 45% of the population is male, and 55% is female.

As of the 2006 Census, the median income for a household in the city was $61,583, and the median income for a family was $89,786. The median income for the city was $36,293. About 11.9% of the population were low income, including 9.0% of those under age 18. The average value of an owned dwelling was $311,329.

In terms of ethnic origin, 50.6% identified as Canadian, 39.6% French, 9.7% Irish, 7.8% English, 6.4% Scottish, 4.1% Italian, 3.7% German, 2.4% First Nations, 1.7% Belgian, 1.7% Spanish, and 1.6% Chinese.

According to the 2001 census, there were 15,690 Roman Catholics in Saint-Lambert, who accounted for seventy-six percent of the population. Additionally, there were 1,970 Protestants in Saint-Lambert in 2001, accounting for 9.5% of all residents. The number of non-Christians in Saint-Lambert amounts to less than five percent of the population, and 9.6% of the population observe no religion whatsoever.

Canada Census mother tongue - Saint-Lambert, Montérégie, Quebec
Census	Total	French			English			Other			French and English		
Year	responses	Count	Trend	Pop %	Count	Trend	Pop %	Count	Trend	Pop %	Count	Trend	Pop %
2016	21,120	15,625	0.0%	73.98%	2,530	▼12.0%	11.98%	2,375	▲21.2%	11.25%	330	0.0%	1.56%
2011	20,945	15,635	▲0.6%	74.65%	2,835	▼11.5%	13.54%	1,960	▼0.2%	9.36%	330	▲13.8%	1.58%
2006	21,050	15,545	▲20.1%	73.84%	3,205	▼2.1%	15.22%	2,000	▼25.0%	9.5%	290	▼1.7%	1.38%
2001	20,650	15,415	▲3.4%	74.65%	3,275	▼11.6%	15.86%	1,665	▲8.5%	8.06%	295	▼13.2%	1.43%
1996	20,620	14,910	n/a	72.3%	3,705	n/a	17.97%	1,535	n/a	7.44%	340	n/a	1.65%

== Economy ==
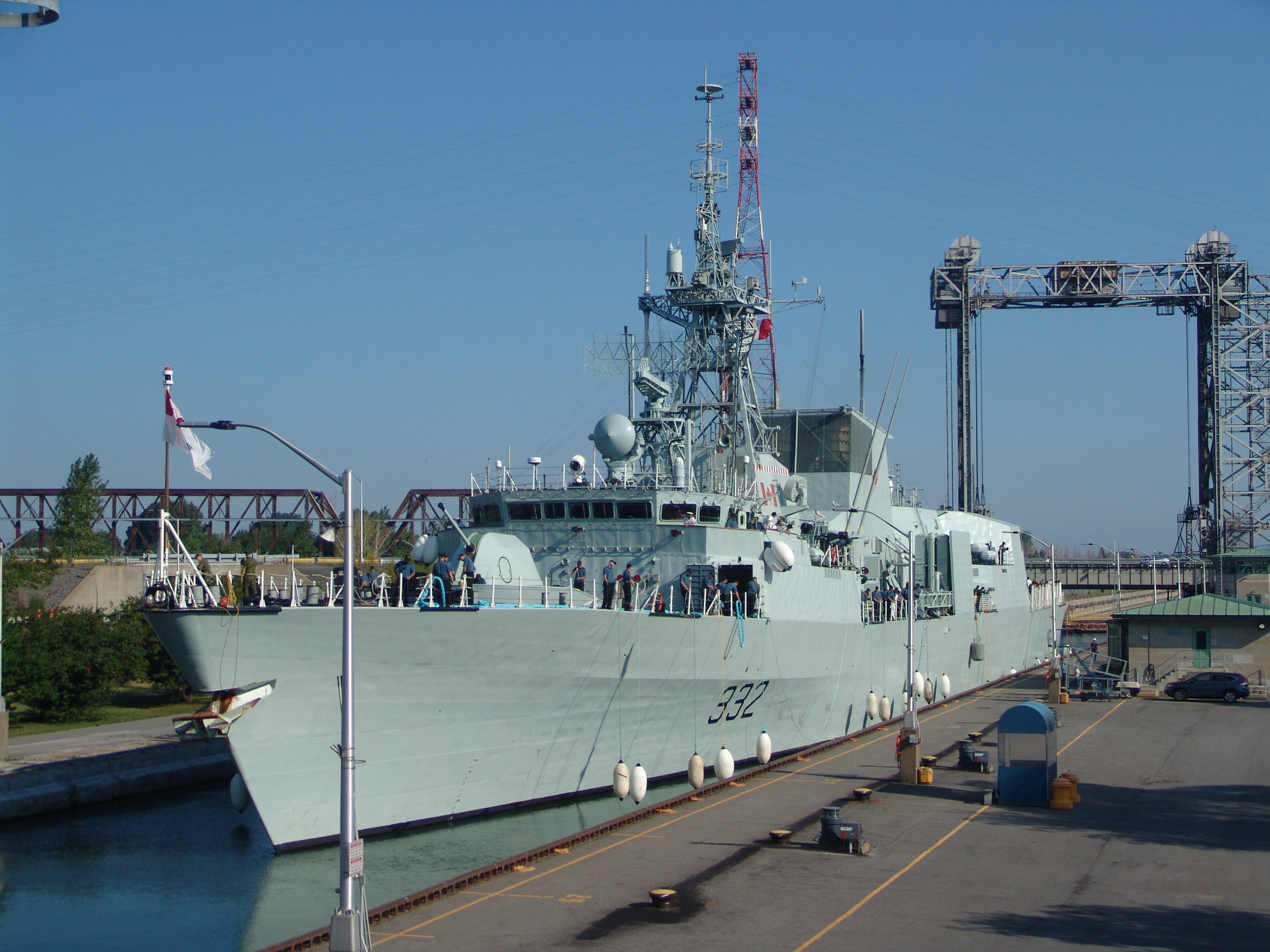
HMCS Ville de Québec in the St. Lambert Lock.

Most of Saint-Lambert's commercial activity is based on Victoria Avenue, particularly on the part of the strip in the city's downtown (between Riverside Drive and the CN tracks), known as "the Village". This part of Victoria is most notably the location to the flagship of Taylor's department store. On this part of Victoria alone, there are around 44 businesses that sell durable and semi-durable goods; 22 cafés, bistros and restaurants and 960 street parking spaces. Around 50% of customers in the area come by automobile and 40% come by foot.

Saint-Lambert is also home to Groupe Serdy, the owner of cable television specialty channels Évasion and Zeste. Roctest, a firm that specializes in making instrumentation for civil engineering projects also has its head office and factory in Saint-Lambert. Other notable Saint-Lambert businesses include Les Éditions Héritage book publisher and a Dare Foods (formerly Lido Biscuit) cookie factory.

== Arts and culture ==
There are a handful of notable cultural institutions based in Saint-Lambert, such as Le Balcon d'Art and La Foire d'Art Contemporain de Saint-Lambert.

Saint-Lambert is also home to the Saint Lambert Municipal Memorial Library. It has two branches, the main branch is located on Mercille Avenue, and the other branch located in Préville.

Various large events take place annually in Saint-Lambert. One of these is Saint-Lambert Days, which takes place over a four-day period in late August and features live concerts and performances, games, and sidewalk sales. More than 80,000 people attend St. Lambert Days each year.

There are three Roman Catholic churches in Saint-Lambert: Église catholique de St-Lambert and Église catholique Saint-Thomas-d'Aquin serve Francophone Catholics, and St. Francis of Assisi Catholic Church serves Anglophone Catholics. There are also five Protestant churches in Saint-Lambert which also serve neighbouring municipalities: St. Barnabas Anglican Church, St. Andrew's Presbyterian Church, St. Lambert United Church, the South Shore Seventh-day Adventist Church and Good Shepherd Lutheran Church.

== Government ==
=== Municipal ===
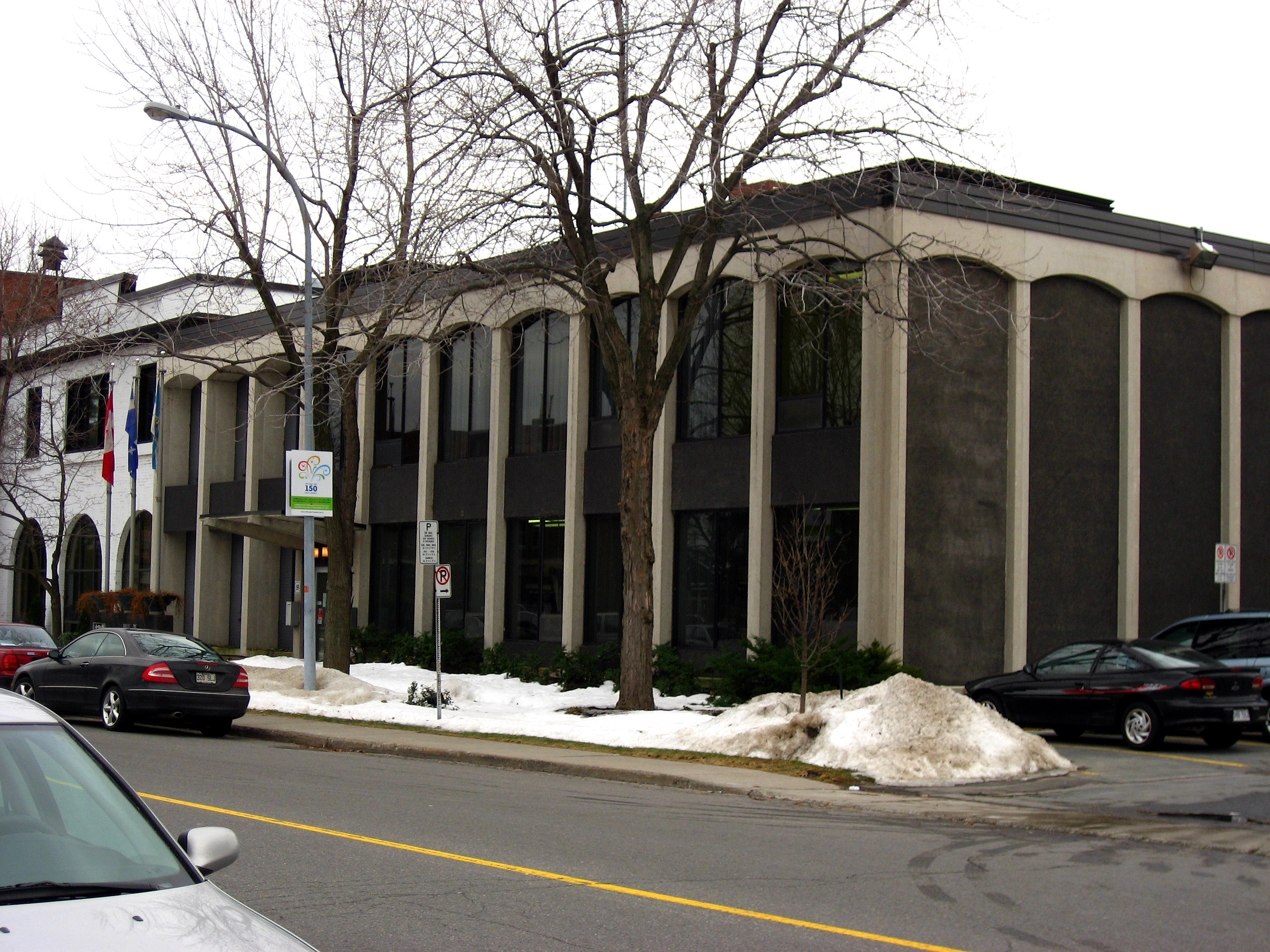
The City Hall of Saint-Lambert

The mayor of the City of Saint-Lambert is Pascale Mongrain, who became the city's first female mayor in the 2021 election. There are eight city councillors.

Saint-Lambert City Council
District	Councillor
1	Francis Le Chatelier
2	Claude Ferguson
3	Alexandrine Lamoureux-Salvas
4	Julie Bourgoin
5	Loïc Blancquert
6	Liette Michaud
7	Virginie Dostie-Toupin
8	Stéphanie Verreault

=== Federal and provincial ===
Traditionally, the city of Saint-Lambert is predominantly federalist, specifically Liberal both federally and provincially. Despite this, in federal politics the riding tends to usually go in favour of the Bloc Québécois, because it includes a considerable portion of the more sovereigntist borough of Le Vieux-Longueuil in Longueuil.

The city of Saint-Lambert is located in the federal riding of Brossard-Saint-Lambert, and its Member of Parliament is Alexandra Mendes of the Liberal Party.

In provincial politics, Saint-Lambert forms part of the Laporte riding and its Member of the National Assembly is Nicole Ménard of the Quebec Liberal Party. The provincial riding is named after Pierre Laporte, a Quebec government cabinet minister who was kidnapped from outside his Saint-Lambert home and murdered by the Front de libération du Québec in the October Crisis of 1970.

== Transport ==
Roads

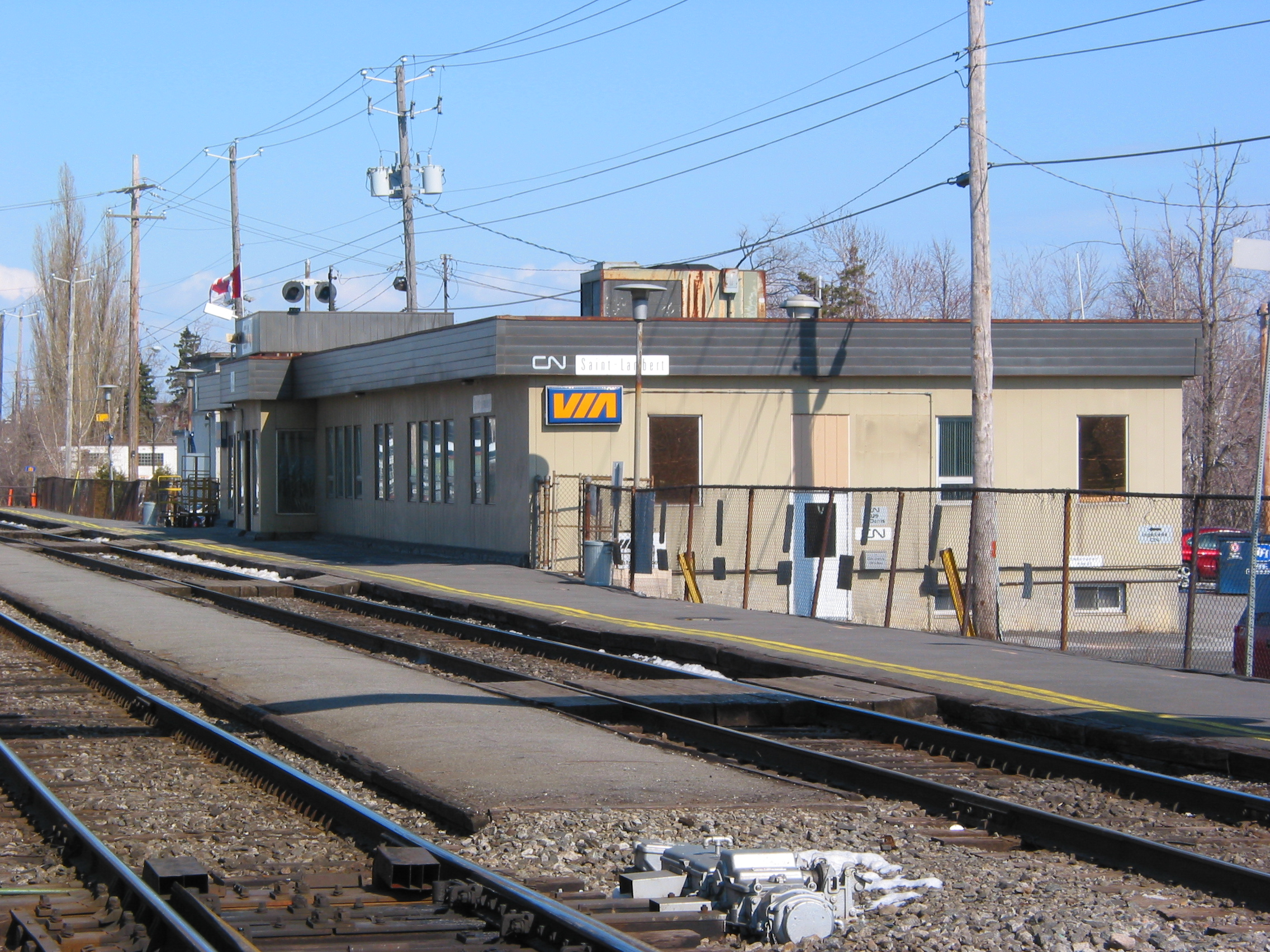
The Saint-Lambert railway station in 2002.

Saint-Lambert is served by the most important autoroute in Quebec province: Autoroute 20 . Saint-Lambert is also served by one of the most important provincial highway: Route 132. The Route 112 is also serving Saint-Lambert.

Important streets in Saint-Lambert include Victoria Avenue, Notre-Dame Street, Green Street, Desaulniers Boulevard, Riverside Drive, Sir-Wilfrid-Laurier Boulevard, Simard Boulevard and Tiffin Road.

In Saint-Lambert, two bridges link with Montreal (one to the Old Port and the other one, a bridge meant for bicycles, that connects to Île Notre-Dame). The Victoria Bridge links Saint-Lambert to Montreal Island. The Jacques Cartier Bridge in Longueuil is half a kilometre from Saint-Lambert and the Champlain Bridge in Brossard is a kilometre away from Saint-Lambert.

Passenger rail

Via Rail serves Saint-Lambert railway station with its daily Montreal-Quebec City, Montreal-Gaspé and Montreal-Halifax trains.

Amtrak, the U.S. national passenger rail system, also provides daily service to Saint-Lambert railway station, operating its Adirondack in both directions between Montreal and New York City, using the Victoria Bridge.

Saint-Lambert railway station is also served by commuter rail on the Réseau de transport métropolitain's Mont-Saint-Hilaire line.

Transit

Bus service in Saint-Lambert is provided by the Réseau de transport de Longueuil. It is served by routes 1, 2, 6, 13, 14, 15, 37. 54. 55, 106 and 115. Bus service was originally provided by Chambly Transport as well as the Commission de Transport de la Communauté Urbaine de Montréal.

Interurban streetcar service was operated until 1956 by the Montreal and Southern Counties Railway.

== Education ==
The highest level of the educational facilities in Saint-Lambert is the public anglophone CEGEP with 2,500 students, Champlain College Saint-Lambert which also houses an office for Université du Québec à Montréal. The Commission Scolaire Marie-Victorin has jurisdiction over three French language primary schools in Saint-Lambert, École Des Saints-Anges, École Rabeau and Préville Elementary.

Collège Durocher Saint-Lambert is a large French language private school and is therefore not affiliated with any school board. It consists of two campuses, the Saint-Lambert Campus on the corner of Riverside and Notre-Dame Avenue as well as the Durocher Campus on the corner of Riverside and Tiffin Road, opposite Champlain Regional College.

The English language Riverside School Board operates five schools on Saint-Lambert's territory. The most notable of these is the IB-accredited Saint-Lambert International High School which is home to over five-hundred students from Grade 7-Grade 11. The other secondary school that the board operates in the city is The Alternate School which is meant to reintegrate at-risk youth into mainstream society. St. Lambert Elementary School serves Kindergarten to Grade 6, and also houses around five-hundred students. Intellectually disabled students are served by REACH School as well as a program at Saint-Lambert International High School geared toward their academic success. ACCESS Continuing Education and Career Training Centre is an adult education institution, helping adults and immigrants get high school diplomas.

The South Shore Protestant Regional School Board previously served the municipality.

== Sports ==
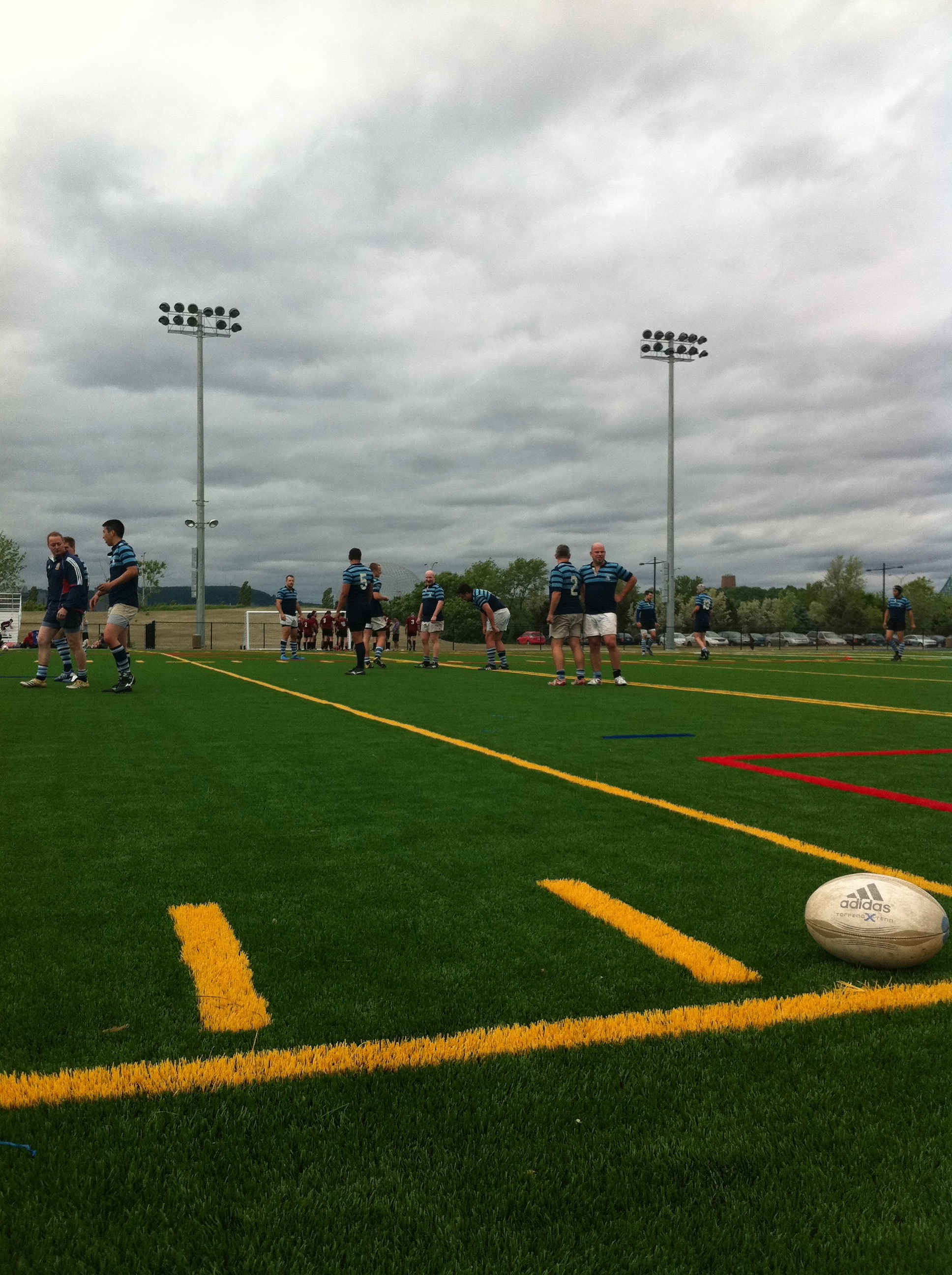
A St. Lambert Locks Rugby match at Seaway Park.

Saint-Lambert is home to the St. Lambert Locks RFC men's and women's rugby union teams, which belong to Rugby Quebec. It is also represented by the Blue Machine swimming team.

At the intercollegiate level, St. Lambert is represented by the Champlain College Saint-Lambert Cavaliers, which field both men's and women's teams in badminton, basketball, cross country running, Canadian football, rugby union, soccer and volleyball. Both of Saint-Lambert's secondary schools also field teams.

Saint-Lambert is also home to several sports venues including the Eric Sharp Arena, an indoor swimming pool and a recreation centre. It also has several outdoor athletics facilities situated in parks.

== Media ==
The city of Saint-Lambert is home to one weekly newspaper, the bilingual St-Lambert Journal. It is also served by a regional French-language weekly newspaper, Le Courrier du Sud, which is based out of neighbouring Longueuil

== Notable natives and residents ==
- Douglas Bennett (1918–2008), won silver medal in canoeing (Men's Canadian Singles, 1000 metres) at 1948 Summer Olympics in London
- Louis Bétournay (1825–1879), first French-Canadian judge in Manitoba (appointed 1872)
- Ian A. Bourne, Chief Financial Officer, GE Canada, Inc. (1985–1989); Senior Vice-President and Chief Financial Officer, Canada Post Corporation (1992–1997); Executive Vice-President and Chief Financial Officer, TransAlta Corporation (1998–2005); Vice-Chairman/Interim CEO, SNC-Lavalin Group, Inc. (2012); Chairman of the Board, SNC-Lavalin Group, Inc. (2012–2015); Chairman of the Board, Ballard Power Systems, Inc. (2006–2018); grew up on Edison Avenue (played for Victoria Park teams in the CSA) during the '50s and '60s.
- Miriam Burland (1902–1996), first woman astronomer/astrophysicist on staff at the Dominion Observatory (1927)
- Régine Chassagne, co-founder of Arcade Fire, a Canadian indie alternative rock band
- Arlette Cousture, French-Canadian novelist
- Steve Kasper, NHL hockey player (1980–1993); head coach of the Boston Bruins (1995–1997); grew up on L'Esperance St. in the '60s and '70s
- Pierre Laporte, Quebec politician; resident of Robitaille St. at the time of his kidnapping and murder in 1970
- Don MacIver, played six games for the Winnipeg Jets of the National Hockey League (NHL) in the winter of 1979-80 but did not register a point. Grew up on Upper Edison Avenue from the mid-50s to mid-70s
- W. Allen McLaren, recipient of the Polar Medal; grew up on Hickson Avenue during the 40s and 50s
- Thornton "Tee" McLaren (1943-2024), captain of the 1977 Queensland team which won the Australian (ice) hockey championship; brother of W. Allen McLaren (above)
- Jim Munson, Canadian senator; resided in St-Lambert during his high school years (1960–1964)
- Jean-Marc Pelletier, played seven games as goalie in the National Hockey League (NHL) for Philadelphia and Phoenix, winning one (1998–2004)
- Harold William Hounsfield Riley (1877–1946), moved to Calgary when he was eleven years old; appointed Deputy Provincial Secretary of Alberta on the formation of the Province in 1905
- Todd Swift, British-Canadian poet, university teacher, editor, critic, and publisher; grew up on Mortlake Avenue from the late '60s through the early '80s
- David Saint-Jacques, is a Canadian astronaut with the Canadian Space Agency (CSA). He is also an astrophysicist, engineer, and a physician.
- Dominique Lord is a professor in civil engineering at Texas A&M University, who is primarily known for his work in highway safety.

== Partner cities ==
- Vernon, British Columbia, Canada
- Marblehead, Massachusetts, United States
- La Flèche, Pays de la Loire, France

== See also ==
- List of anglophone communities in Quebec
- List of cities in Quebec
- Municipal reorganization in Quebec
- Urban agglomeration of Longueuil
- Ville LeMoyne
