= South Shore Protestant Regional School Board =

School district in Quebec, Canada

The South Shore Protestant Regional School Board (SSPRSB) was a Protestant Christian school district in Greater Montreal, Quebec, Canada. It served the South Shore region and it was headquartered in St. Lambert.

The district operated elementary and secondary schools that served students from the St. Lawrence School Board and the South Centre School Board areas. The Richelieu Valley School Board operated its own elementary schools but secondary students from that board attended South Shore. In 1967 the board of education of the school district had nine members.

One of the Working papers on English language institutions in Quebec of 1982, by Alliance Québec, stated that the district was one of the first in North America to create a language immersion program targeting Anglophone students.

== History ==
The school board was formed in 1965. It went into effect on July 1, 1967. The district had 23 schools when it opened on September 5 of that year, and at that time it had over 450 teaching employees and over 9,000 students.

In 1992, all areas of the Richelieu Valley and the South Shore were incorporated into the board's territory. The board was dissolved in 1998.

== Area served ==
As of 1965, the municipalities within the school board were: Beloeil, Boucherville, Brossard, Candiac, Chambly, Douville, Fort Chambly, Greenfield Park, Iberville, Jacques Cartier, L'Acadie, Lacolle, Lafleche, Laprairie, La Providence, Lemoyne, Longueuil, Marieville, McMasterville, Mont St. Hilaire, Notre Dame, Notre Dame de Bon Secours, Notre Dame du Mont Carmel, Otterburn Park, Preville, Richelieu, Rougemont, Ste. Angele de Monnoir, Ste. Anne de Sabrevois, St. Basile le Grand, St. Blaise, St. Bruno de Montarville, St. Cyprien of Chaudière-Appalaches (including Napierville V.), Ste. Famille de Boucherville, St. Hilaire, St. Hubert, St. Hyacinthe, St. Johns, St. Jean Baptiste, St. Jean l'Evangeliste, St. Joseph, St. Joseph de Chambly, Ste. Julie, St. Lambert, St. Luc, St. Marc, Ste. Marie de Monnoir, St. Mathieu de Beloeil, St. Michel de Rougemont, St. Patrice de Sherrington, St. Paul de l'ile aux Noix and St. Valentin. It also served a portion of St. Bernard de Lacolle.

When it opened in 1967, the district served schooling in all grade levels in the school boards of Chambly-Richelieu, Greenfield Park, Lacolle, Longueuil, Pinehurst-East Greenfield, Rougemont, St. Hubert, St. Hyacinthe, St. Johns, and St. Lambert. In the St. Hilaire and Richelieu Valley school boards the district served grades 7 through 12. In the Candiac school board it only served grades 8 through 12.

== Schools ==
Centennial Regional High School

Secondary schools

- Centennial Regional High School (Greenfield Park), opened in 1972, designed to be the regional high school serving the entire school board area.

Primary schools

- Harold Napper Elementary School (Brossard)
- St. Lambert Bilingual School - St. Lambert
  - In the early 1960s the school board conducted an experimental program on students in the school by putting Anglophone children in classrooms where only French was used.
- William White School (Longueuil)

== See also ==
- Riverside School Board, now serving the same region
