= Victoria Avenue (Saint-Lambert, Quebec) =

Major street in Canada

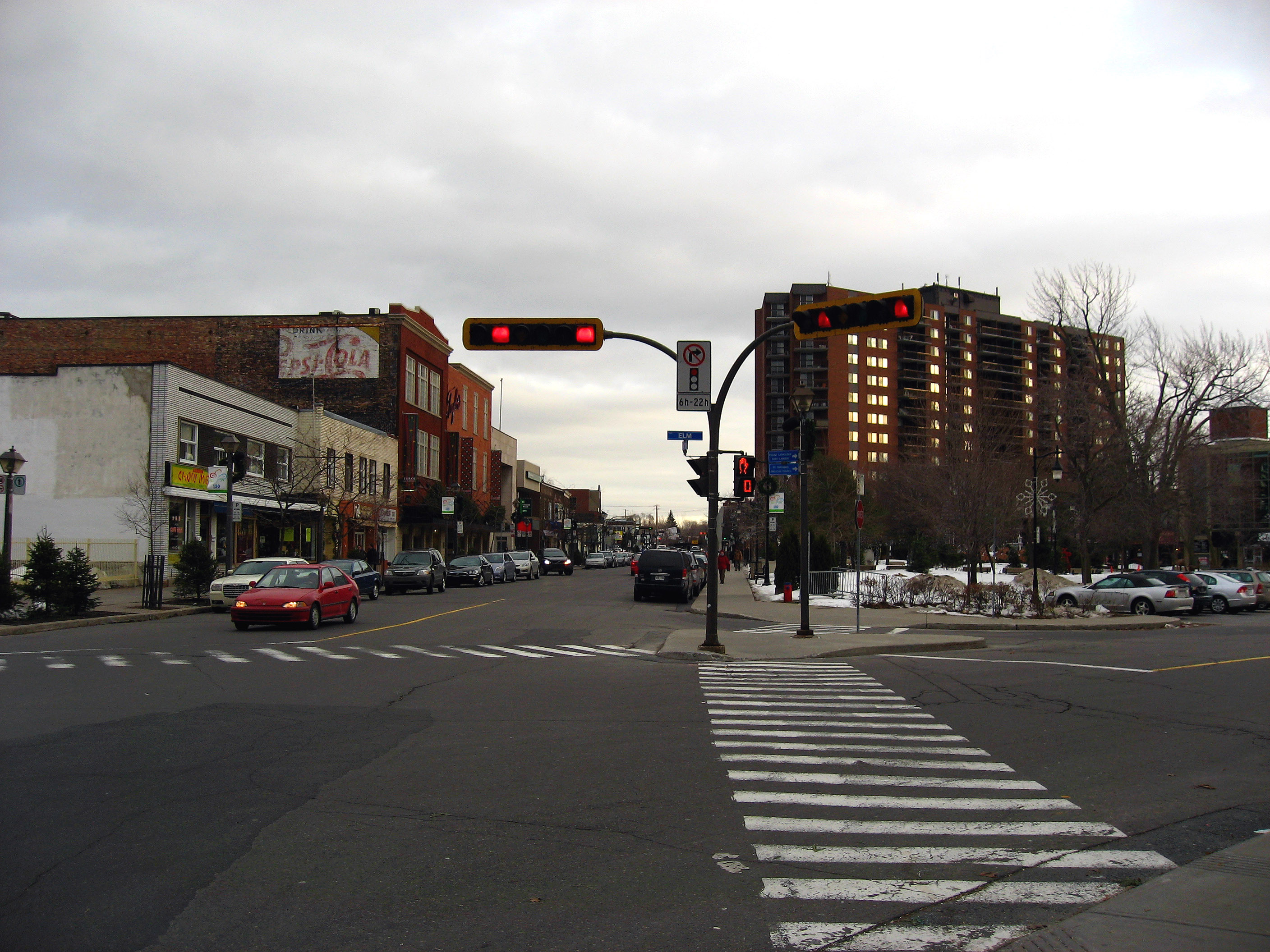
- Victoria Avenue, at the intersection of Green Street and Elm Street
- Interactive map of Victoria Avenue
- Native name: Avenue Victoria (French)
- Location: Between Riverside Drive and the Brossard municipal boundary
- Coordinates: 45.495156°N 73.500242°W

Victoria Avenue (French: Avenue Victoria) is a major street located in city of Saint-Lambert, Quebec and in the borough of Greenfield Park in the city of Longueuil, Quebec, Canada. Victoria Avenue extends from Riverside Drive, near Route 132 and the Saint Lawrence River in the north, to the Brossard municipal boundary in the south. Victoria Avenue is known as Lapinière Boulevard in Brossard.

Victoria Avenue is named for Queen Victoria (1819–1901), the Queen of Canada from 1837 to her death in 1901. The portion of Victoria Avenue in Greenfield Park was originally named Devonshire Road.

== Economy ==
The segment of Victoria Avenue between Riverside Drive and the Saint-Lambert railway station is most notable for being Saint-Lambert's shopping district, locally known as The Village (French: Le Village). Taylor's flagship department store is located on Victoria, just south of Green Street. There are around 44 businesses that sell durable and semi-durable goods; 22 cafés, bistros and restaurants and 960 street parking spaces. Around 50% of customers in the area come by automobile and 40% come by foot.

Around 70 businesses are located on Victoria Avenue until Saint-Lambert railway station or on Churchill Boulevard in both Saint-Lambert and Greenfield Park. An additional 44 businesses are located between Churchill Boulevard and Brossard.

== See also ==
- Royal eponyms in Canada
