= Collège Durocher Saint-Lambert =

Location
- Saint-Lambert, Quebec; Canada; 45.5155°N 73.5172°W

Information
- School type: Private Secondary School
- Motto: Passion-Tradition-Éducation (Passion-Tradition-Education)
- Religious affiliation: Roman Catholic
- Founded: 1910
- General Principal: Francis Roy
- Pavillon Principals: Denyse Verret (Grades 7-8), François Boyer (Grades 9-10-11)
- Deputy Principals: Stéphane Dugré (Grade 7); Jacques Gravel (Grade 8); Ninon Rozon (Grade 9); Chantal Lessard (Grade 10); Johanne Girard (Grade 11)
- Coordinators: Lyne St-Hilaire (Information resources) Daniel Chicoine (Software/Pedagogic Development) Daniel Ravenelle (Materials)
- Grades: Grade 7-11
- Language: French
- Area: South Shore (Montreal)
- Website: www.cdsl.qc.ca

Collège Durocher Saint-Lambert (CDSL) is a private co-ed Roman Catholic secondary school in Saint-Lambert, Quebec, Canada. Its language of instruction is French.

The CDSL operates two campuses. The Saint-Lambert Pavilion is used by students in the first cycle of secondary school. The Durocher Pavilion is used by students in the second cycle.

Collège Durocher Saint-Lambert ranked 18th in Quebec in 2008 in terms of the academic performance of its students according to a study by L'Actualité magazine.
