= Dominique Lord =

Canadian and American roadway safety engineer

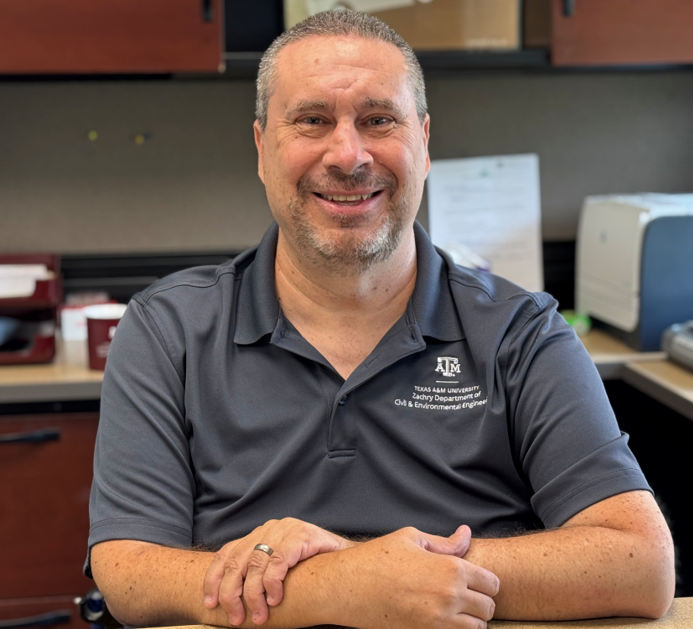
- Born: September, 1969; Saint-Lambert, Quebec, Canada
- Education: University of Toronto (M.A.Sc., Ph.D.) McGill University (B.Eng.)
- Title: Professor, Texas A&M University

Dominique Lord is a Canadian-American scientist/engineer who is primarily known for his research work in highway safety and engineering. He is currently a professor and holder of the A.P. and Florence Wiley Faculty Fellowship in the Zachry Department of Civil & Environmental Engineering at Texas A&M University.

== Early life and education ==
Lord was born in September 1969 and raised in Saint-Lambert, Quebec, a suburb of Montreal. He attended Collège Charles-Lemoyne, a private high school, between 1981 and 1986. He graduated in Civil Engineering from McGill University in 1992 and went on to complete his M.A.Sc. (1994) and Ph.D. (2000) in Civil Engineering from the University of Toronto. He conducted his Ph.D. research under the guidance of Dr. Ezra Hauer and Dr. Bhagwant Persaud, a professor at Toronto Metropolitan University (formerly Ryerson University).

== Career ==
=== Academic positions ===
Lord is a professor and holder of the A.P. and Florence Wiley Faculty Fellowship in the Zachry Department of Civil and Environmental Engineering Department at Texas A&M University. He joined the faculty as an assistant professor in 2004, following a three-year tenure as an associate research scientist with the Texas A&M Transportation Institute. Since 2008, he has been an associate member of the Interuniversity Research Centre on Enterprise Networks, Logistics and Transportation (CIRRELT) at the University of Montreal.

=== Research work ===
Lord conducts fundamental work in highway safety. He is known to have developed the theory for characterizing the crash process from the mathematical perspective and detailing the negative effects related to using data characterized by small sample sizes and low sample mean on modeling crash data with the negative binomial model, the Poisson-lognormal model, and several crash-severity models. He also advanced the knowledge in quantifying the influences of site selection and regression-to-the-mean (RTM) biases when conducting before-after studies. His team has developed the negative binomial-Lindley (NB-L) model for analyzing crash or any other types of data characterized with excess zero observations. Along with Dr. Soheil Sohrabi, they conceived the basic framework for identifying the safest paths in route planning applications for smart phones. A patent application is currently under review. His Google Scholar citation stands at 21,115+ with an h-index=67, and published 189 peer-reviewed publications in academic journals (as of October 2026).

=== Academic recognitions ===
Lord has been identified as one of the researchers who had an important impact in highway safety research. He was ranked among the top 5 most cited authors in the Journal Accident Analysis and Prevention, and was also ranked in the top 5 in the field of accident analysis according to ScholarGPS. Furthermore, the Stanford University/Elsevier Data Repository ranking of scholars has listed him in the top 2% over the last eight years. He has been the recipient of the CUTC-ARTBA New Faculty Award, the D. Grant Mickle Award, and the New Investigator Award for Non-intentional Injuries by the Centers for Disease Control and Prevention (CDC).

Lord has been interviewed by the media about his work and important issues in highway safety. In 2014, he conducted a study on the safety effects of red-light cameras in Chicago on behalf of the Chicago Tribune. He has been a contributor to the Toronto Star, Radio Health Journal, and other print/radio media.

== Books ==
- Lord, D., Qin, X., and Geedipally, S.R. (2026). Highway Safety Analytics and Modeling. 2nd Ed. Elsevier Publishing ltd., Amsterdam, NL. (©2026)
- Lord, D., Qin, X., and Geedipally, S.R. (2021). Highway Safety Analytics and Modeling. 1st Ed. Elsevier Publishing ltd., Amsterdam, NL. (©2021)
- Lord, D. and S. Washington (Eds.) (2018). Safe Mobility: Challenges, Methodology and Solutions. Volume 11 of Transport and Sustainability, Emerald Publishing Ltd, Bingley, UK. (©2018)
- Instruction Manual for CrimeStat IV: A Spatial Statistics Program for the Analysis of Crime Incident Locations, Version 4.0 (2013). Participated in the writing of several chapters. (©2013)

== Selected and most cited publications ==
- Kuo, P.-F., W.-T. Hsu, D. Lord, and I.G.B. Putra (2024). Classification of autonomous vehicle crash severity: Solving the problems of imbalanced datasets and small sample size. Accident Analysis & Prevention, 205, 107666.
- Dzinyela, R., N. Alnawmasi, E.K. Adanu, B. Dadashova, D. Lord, and F. Mannering (2024). A multi-year statistical analysis of driver injury severities in single-vehicle freeway crashes with and without airbags deployed. Analytic Methods in Accident Research, 41, 100317.
- Islam, A.S.M.M., M. Shirazi, and D. Lord (2023). Grouped Random Parameters Negative Binomial-Lindley for Accounting Unobserved Heterogeneity in Crash Data with Preponderant Zero Observations. Analytical Methods in Accident Research, 37, 100255.
- Sohrabi, S., A. Khodadadi, S.M. Mousavi, B. Dadashova, and D. Lord (2021). Quantifying Autonomous Vehicle Safety: A Scoping Review of the Literature, Evaluation of Methods, and Directions for Future Research. Accident Analysis & Prevention, Vol. 152, 106003.
- Shaon, M.R.R., X. Qin, A. Shirazi, D. Lord, and S. Geedipally (2018). Developing a Random Parameters Negative Binomial-Lindley Generalized Linear Model to analyze Highly Over-Dispersed Data. Analytic Methods in Accident Research, Vol. 18, pp. 33–44.
- Ye, F., and D. Lord (2014). Comparing Three Commonly Used Crash Severity Models on Sample Size Requirements: Multinomial Logit, Ordered Probit and Mixed Logit Models. Analytic Methods in Accident Research, Vol. 1, pp. 72–85.
- D. Lord, and P-F. Kuo (2012). Examining the Effects of Site Selection Criteria for Evaluating the Effectiveness of Traffic Safety Improvement Countermeasures. Accident Analysis & Prevention, Vol. 47, pp. 52–63.
- Geedipally, S.R., D. Lord, and S.S. Dhavala (2012). The Negative Binomial-Lindley Generalized Linear Model: characteristics and Application using Crash Data. Accident Analysis & Prevention, Vol. 45, No. 2, pp. 258–265.
- Savolainen, P.T., F.L. Mannering, D. Lord, and M.A. Quddus (2011). The Statistical Analysis of Highway Crash-Injury Severities: A Review and Assessment of Methodological Alternatives. Accident Analysis & Prevention, Vol. 43, No. 5, pp. 1666–1676.
- D. Lord, and F. Mannering (2010). The Statistical Analysis of Crash-Frequency Data: A Review and Assessment of Methodological Alternatives. Transportation Research - Part A, Vol. 44, No. 5, pp. 291–305.
- D. Lord, S. Guikema, and S.R. Geedipally (2008). Application of the Conway-Maxwell-Poisson Generalized Linear Model for Analyzing Motor Vehicle Crashes. Accident Analysis & Prevention, Vol. 40, No. 3, pp. 1123–1134.
- D. Lord, S.P. Washington, and J.N. Ivan (2005). Poisson, Poisson-Gamma and Zero Inflated Regression Models of Motor Vehicle Crashes: Balancing Statistical Fit and Theory. Accident Analysis & Prevention, Vol. 37, No. 1, pp. 35–46.
- Miaou, S.-P., and D. Lord (2003). Modeling Traffic-Flow Relationships at Signalized Intersections: Dispersion Parameter, Functional Form and Bayes vs Empirical Bayes. Transportation Research Record 1840, pp. 31–40.

== Personal life ==
Lord is married to Leah Silverman, the daughter of Peter Silverman, and they have a son named Javier. He grew up in the same city as Canadian Astronaut David Saint-Jacques and were schoolmates during the late 70s.
