= Notre-Dame-de-Bon-Secours, Quebec =

Coordinates: 45°27′N 73°15′W

Notre-Dame-de-Bon-Secours (French pronunciation: [nɔtʁə dam də bɔ̃ səkuʁ]) was a former municipality in Quebec. On March 15, 2000, it amalgamated into the city of Richelieu.

== Education ==
The South Shore Protestant Regional School Board previously served the municipality.
