= Heritage Regional High School =

Secondary school in Montreal, Quebec, Canada

Location
- 7455 Chemin Chambly; Longueuil, Quebec, J3Y 3S3; Canada
- Coordinates: 45°29′24″N 73°23′28″W

Information
- School type: English International Baccalaureate secondary school
- Motto: Respect - Excellence - Pride
- School board: Riverside School Board
- Principal: Sujata Saha
- Grades: 7 to 11 (Secondary 1 to Secondary 5)
- Enrollment: 1776 students
- Language: English, French, Spanish
- Area: Longueuil, Saint-Hyacinthe, Boucherville, Sorel-Tracy and other smaller surrounding cities.
- Colours: Grey, black, and green
- Mascot: Husky
- Team name: Heritage Huskies
- Website: www.hrhs.rsb.qc.ca

Heritage Regional High School (HRHS) is a public secondary school located in Longueuil, Quebec, Canada. It was formed in the 2003 merger of Macdonald-Cartier High School of Saint-Hubert, Quebec, with Richelieu Valley Regional High School of McMasterville, Quebec.

== Description ==
As of 2024, Heritage Regional High School serves 1761 students.

HRHS offers curricular focus programs in general studies, International Baccalaureate, fine arts, computer applications and networking, sports excellence, and an alternative work-study program.

== History ==
Macdonald-Cartier High School, an English-language school named in honour of two Fathers of Confederation, Georges-Étienne Cartier and John A. Macdonald, opened in September 1968 in St. Hubert, with space for 3000 students.

The French Mouvement pour l'Intégration Scolaire opened the Richelieu Valley Regional High School in McMasterville in 1969 to accommodate French-language students.

The two schools merged in 2003, becoming Heritage Regional High School.

== Films ==
The 2020 Walt Disney film Clouds was filmed at the school.

== Notable people ==
- Richard Burnett, writer and journalist
