= Todd Swift =

British-Canadian poet (born 1966)

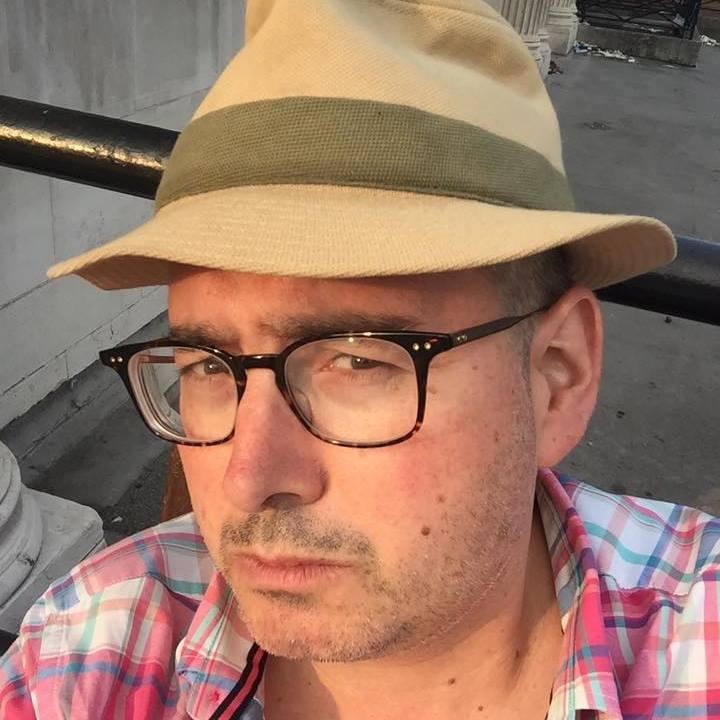
- Born: April 8, 1966 (age 60); Montreal, Quebec, Canada
- Education: Concordia University
- Occupations: Poet, editor, publisher and critic
- Website: store.eyewearpublishing.com

Stanley Todd Swift (born April 8, 1966) is a British-Canadian poet, screenwriter, university teacher, editor, critic, and publisher based in the United Kingdom.

== Background ==
Swift was born in Montreal, Quebec, Canada, and raised in Saint-Lambert, Quebec. He received a B.A. in English from Concordia University (Montreal) and an M.A. and Ph.D. in Creative and Critical Writing from the University of East Anglia. During his undergrad years he was President of CUSID and one of the top-ranked university debaters.

Swift is credited at IMDb with being the story editor for anime cult series Sailor Moon and working on dozens of TV writing assignments for companies like HBO, Fox, Paramount and the CBC. He is the author of nine full collections of poetry; his Selected Poems is from Marick Press, USA. He is also an anthologist and editor. His poems have appeared in journals such as Poetry, The Globe and Mail, Poetry London and The Guardian.

From 2004-2012 he was Oxfam Great Britain's Poet-in-residence. Swift has been a tutor with The Poetry School. He was Senior Lecturer in Creative Writing at Kingston University, England 2006–2013, having previously lectured at Budapest University (ELTE), London Met, and Birkbeck. He has taught at the University of Glasgow. From 2005 Swift has run the literary blog Eyewear and since 2012 has been director and publisher of the indie press Eyewear Publishing, founded in 2012. From 2017–2018 he was Visiting Scholar/ Writer-in-residence for Pembroke College, Cambridge, England.

In May 2019 he was nominated for the post of Oxford University professor of poetry, a contest which was won by Alice Oswald.

Eyewear Publishing merged with Black Spring Press in 2019 where Swift now holds the position of Director of Publishing.

== Controversies ==
In July 2018, following an interview with the president of the writers' union the Society of Authors, controversy arose concerning potentially unfair template contracts which they had received, which limited Eyewear Publishing authors from seeking help from the society as neutral moderators in disputes. Swift stated that the contracts were negotiable and the particular clause could be removed if requested.

In September 2018, feminist organization VIDA published an account by poet KC Trommer detailing alleged business disagreements with Swift and Eyewear Publishing.

After he was nominated for Oxford University professor of poetry, poets Claire Trévien and Aaron Kent issued a joint statement calling Swift unsuitable for the role due to "various accounts of his behaviour available with a simple Google/Twitter search, including the Bookseller’s report on his contracts."

== Bibliography ==
=== Poetry (full collections) ===
- Budavox – 1999
- Café Alibi – 2002
- Rue du Regard – 2004
- Winter Tennis – 2007
- Seaway: New & Selected Poems – 2008
- Mainstream Love Hotel – 2009
- England Is Mine – 2011
- When All My Disappointments Came At Once – 2012
- The Ministry of Emergency Situations: Selected Poems – 2014
- Spring In Name Only – 2020
