= Centennial Regional High School =

- View of Centennial from the corner of Hudson/Bellevue

Location
- 880 Hudson; Greenfield Park (Longueuil), Quebec, J4V 1H1; Canada; 45°29′28″N 73°26′45″W

Information
- School type: Comprehensive English-Language Regional High School
- Motto: Varietas - Concordia - Honestas (Diversity Harmony Moral Dignity)
- Founded: 1972
- School board: Riverside School Board
- Administrator: Amber Coones (VP); Marie-Jade Roy (VP)
- Principal: Sophie Compagna
- Grades: 7 to 11
- Enrollment: 1107 students (2023-2024)
- Language: English, French
- Area: South Shore (Montreal): Greenfield Park, Saint-Hubert, Brossard.
- Colours: Gold and Burgundy
- Team name: The Centennial Chargers
- Website: www.crhs.rsb.qc.ca

Centennial Regional High School (CRHS, French: École secondaire régionale Centennial) is an English-language co-educational comprehensive public high school located in the Greenfield Park borough of Longueuil, Quebec, Canada, a suburb of Montreal. A part of the Riverside School Board, it was opened in 1972 and named to commemorate the centennial anniversary of Canada's confederation. The school's student body is culturally diverse. In the 2011-2012 year, the school adopted a house system in an attempt to raise school spirit. It was previously a part of the South Shore Protestant Regional School Board.

== History ==
It opened in 1972 as the regional high school of the South Shore Protestant board. Upon opening it relieved Chambly High School. It was built within the Longueuil school board even though it was physically in Greenfield Park. Roderick MacLeod and Mary Anne Poutanen, authors of A Meeting of the People: School Boards and Protestant Communities in Quebec, 1801-1998, wrote that this caused "resentment" within the school boards that made up the regional board even though the placement of the school was "intended as a kind of compromise".

== Programs and Services ==
- Middle School Program
- Talented and Gifted Program
- Liberal Arts Program
- Post-Immersion (French Mother Tongue) Program
- English Program
- Business and Career Education
- Creative & Performing Arts
- Languages/Language Arts
- Mathematics, Science and Technology
- Personal Development
- Social Sciences
- Student Support Center
- WOTP Program

== Notable alumni ==
- Steven Crowder, political commentator, media host, and comedian.
- Murray Lightburn, musician, lead singer of The Dears.
- Elisha Cuthbert, film and television actor.
- Patrick Kwok-Choon, film, television, and stage actor.
- Tod Fennell, film and television actor.
- Elias Koteas, film and television actor.
- Jamie Orchard, former TV news anchor for Global Montreal.
- Jonathan "Jon" Lajoie, television actor and stand-up comedian.
- Bryan M. Larkin, Deputy Commissioner, Royal Canadian Mounted Police.
- Sherry Romanado, Member of Parliament.

== See also ==
- Riverside School Board (RSB), Quebec English-language school board responsible for CRHS.
