= Sint-Lambertuskerk (Maastricht) =

Church in Maastricht, Netherlands

Coordinates: 50°50′59″N 5°40′37″E

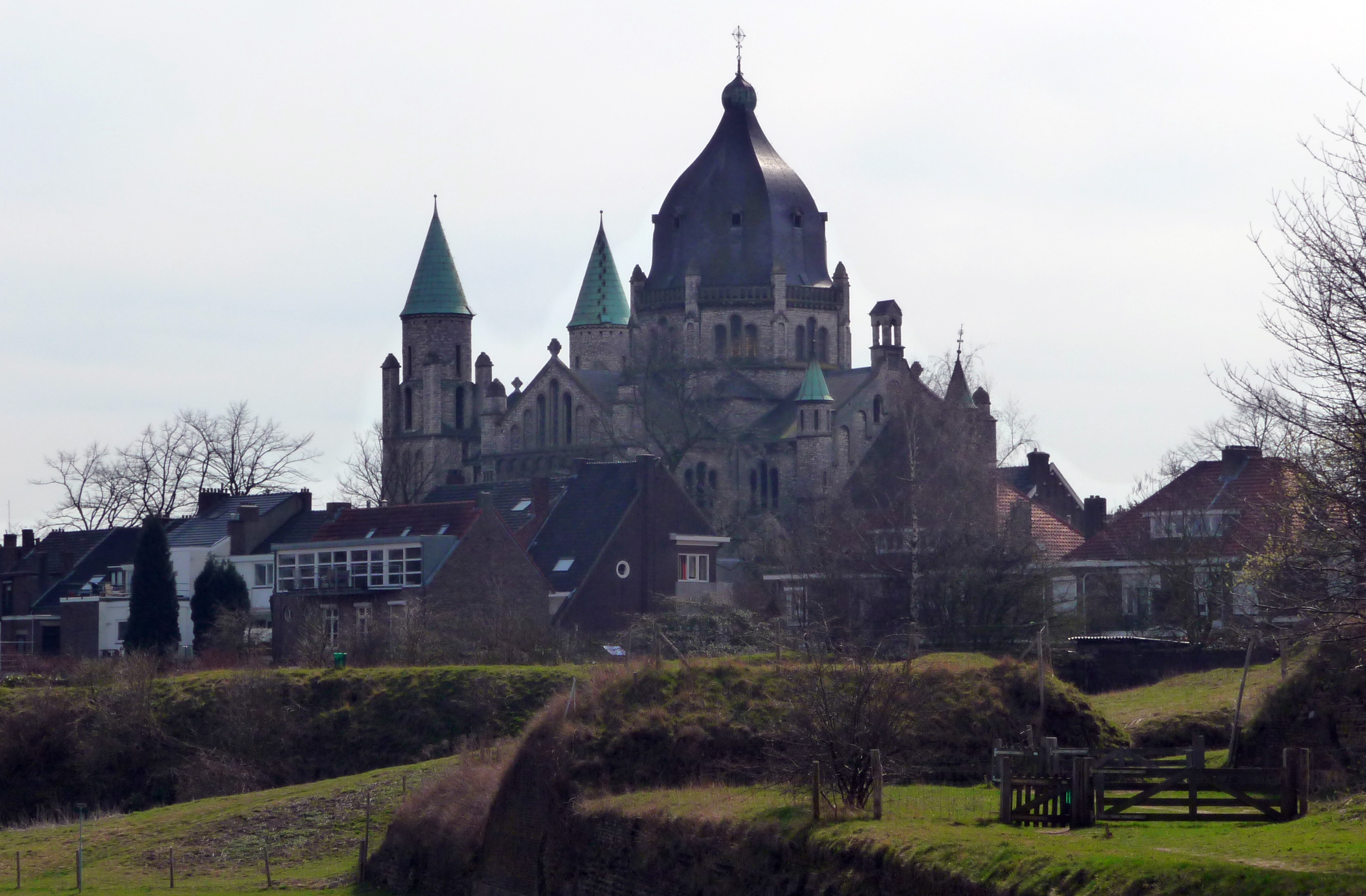
- Remote view from the fortifications of Maastricht

Religion
- Affiliation: Catholicism

Location
- Location: Koningin Emmaplein, Maastricht, Netherlands
- Interactive map of Sint-Lambertuskerk

Architecture
- Architect: Hubert van Groenendael
- Style: Neo-Romanesque
- Completed: 1916

The Sint-Lambertuskerk (St. Lambert's) is a former church in the city of Maastricht, Limburg, Netherlands.

At the time of its completion in 1916, St. Lambert's was the first church in Maastricht outside the medieval city wall. The location of the church was in the so-called Hoge Fronten, an area that for centuries was used for building fortifications, both above ground and below ground. The latter turned out to be a liability for the building's stability.

The church was designed by Hubert van Groenendael in neo-Romanesque style on a cruciform plan. It was built between 1914 and 1916. The church was named after the Maastricht-born saint Lambert, bishop of Maastricht and Liège in the 7th and 8th century. For 70 years the church was operated as a Roman Catholic parish church.

Soon after its completion in 1916, subsidence cracks developed in the structure. Ten years later, the church was restored and no further damage occurred until 1970. Beginning in 1970, portions of the structure began to sag and new cracks developed. From 1985, the building was no longer used as a church. The parish moved to the nearby St. Ann's Church in the same neighbourhood of Brusselsepoort.

In 2010–2012, the church underwent renovations at a cost of 12 million euros. In 2016–2017, it was converted into a laboratory workspace as well as an events location and a private home.

== Gallery ==
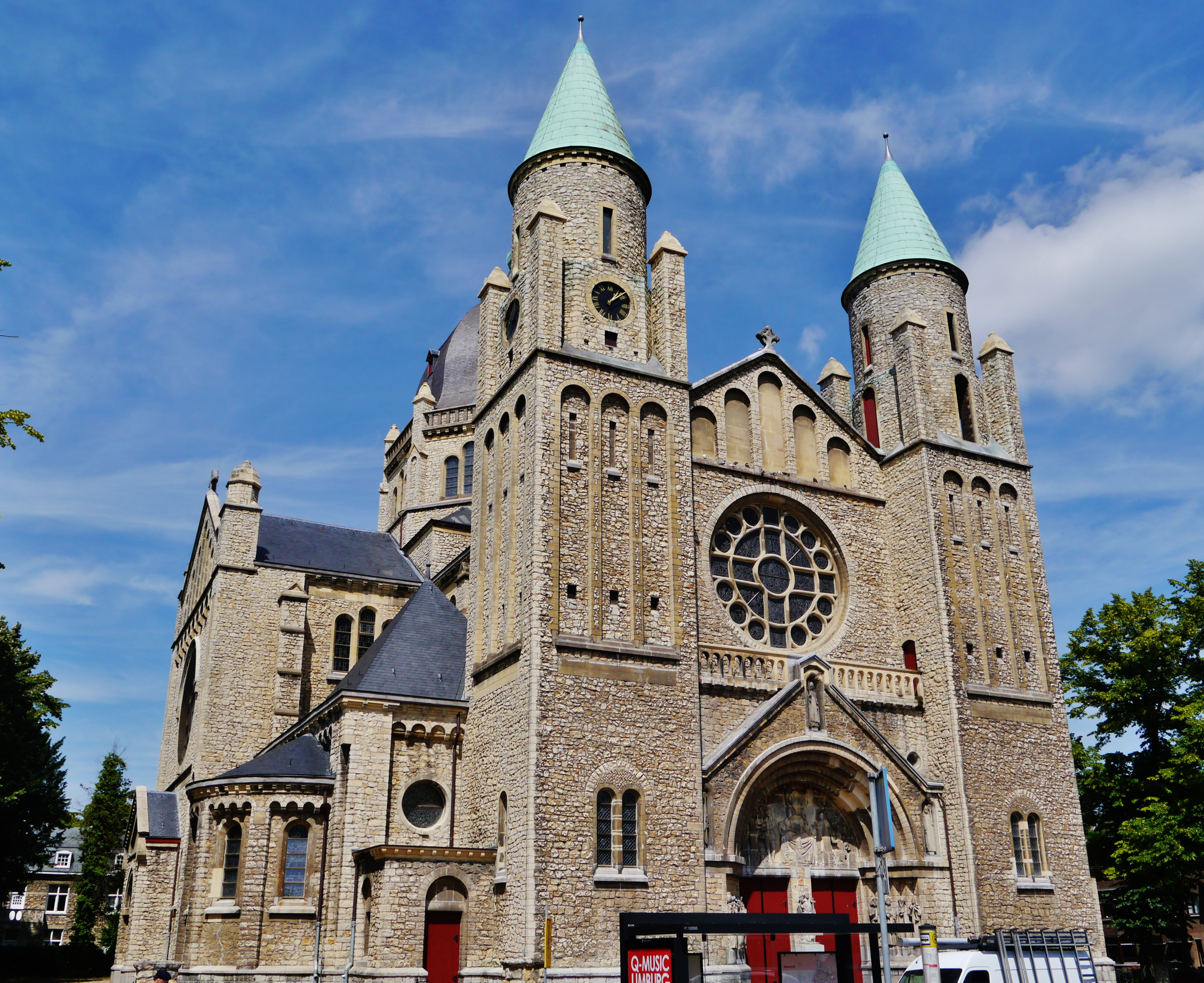
Frontal view

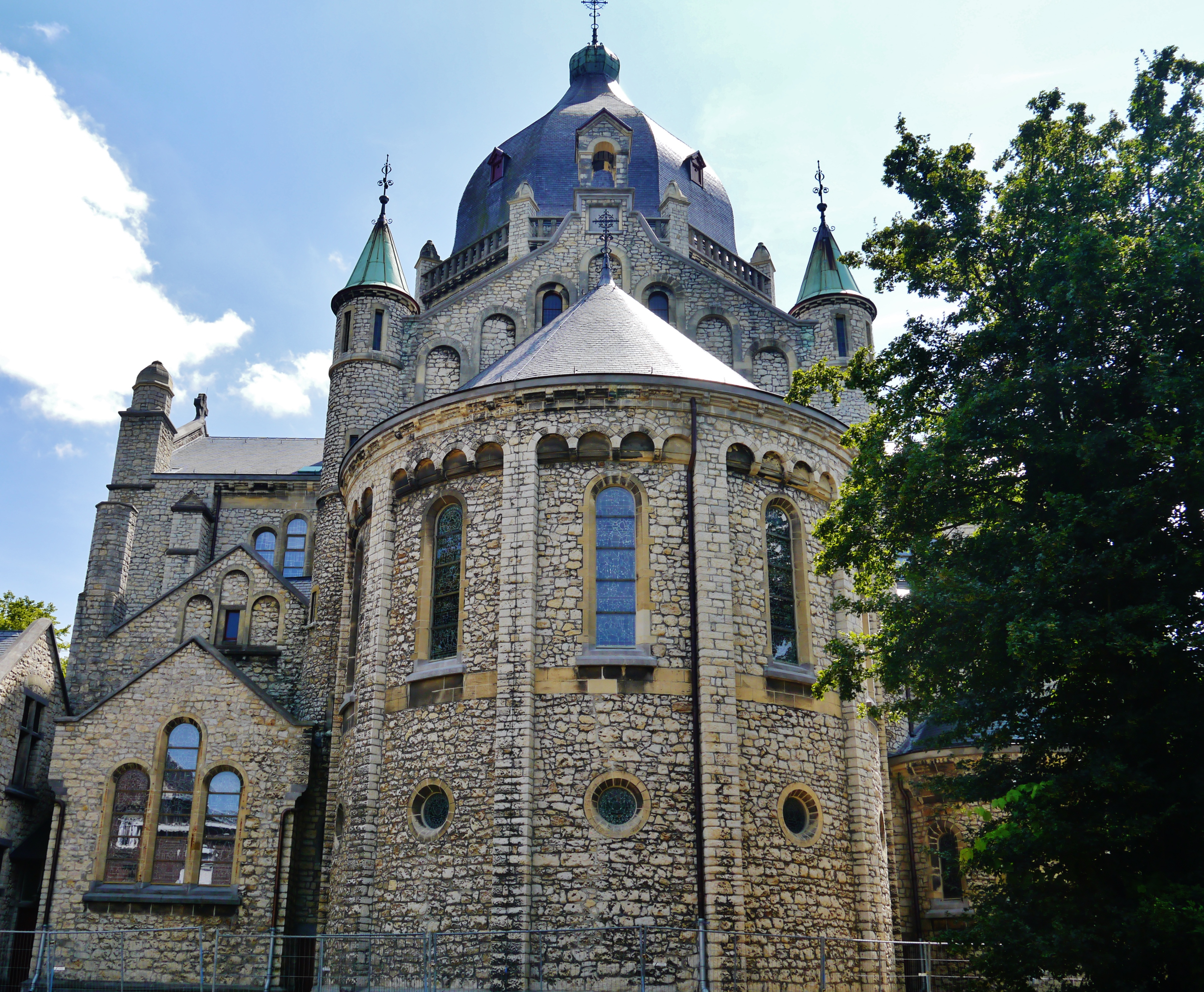
Apse and dome

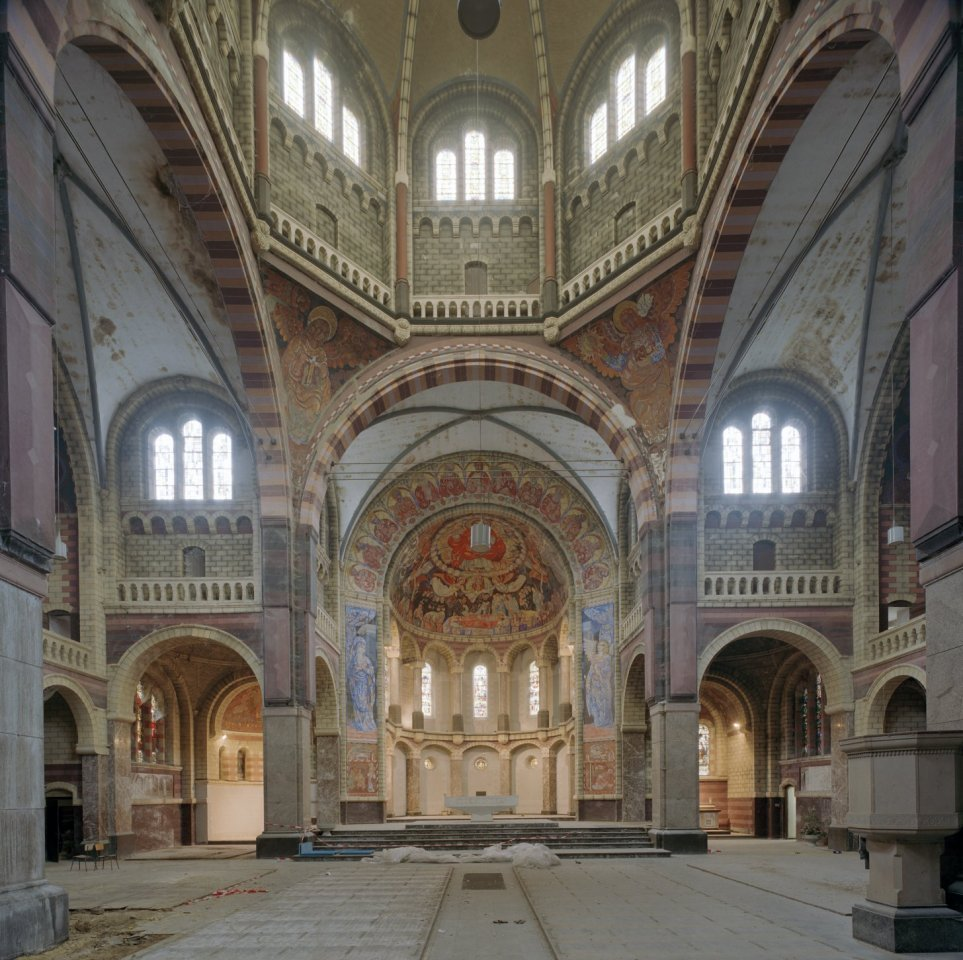
Interior
