= Riverside School Board =

English-language school board in Quebec, Canada

Location
- 7525 chemin de Chambly, Longueuil, Quebec South Shore (Montreal) Canada

District information
- Established: July 1, 1998
- Superintendent: Chantale Scroggins
- Asst. superintendent(s): Colleen Lauzier
- School board: Riverside School Board
- Chair of the board: Christopher Craig
- Schools: 19 elementary schools 4 high schools

Students and staff
- Students: 9,000 (2012-13)

Other information
- Website: www.rsb.qc.ca

The Riverside School Board (RSB, French: Commission scolaire Riverside) is an English-language school board in the province of Quebec and provides educational services and programs to all students who have a certificate of eligibility for English education in Quebec. It is responsible for anglophone public schools on South Shore (Montreal), consistently places among the top five and has one of the lowest dropout rates of the 72 public school boards in Quebec, English or French. It is the birthplace of the French immersion program and offers the International Baccalaureate program in many of its elementary and high schools.

The territory spans more than 7,500 square kilometres (2900 sq. mi.) and extends from Sorel in the north, along the St. Lawrence River to Sainte-Catherine in the west, south to the United States border and several kilometres (miles) east of the Richelieu River. Riverside's educational and training facilities serve the residents of over 115 municipalities on the Montérégie.

Chantale Scroggins is currently the Director General of the school board and the Chair of the Council of Commissioners is Christopher Craig.

== Schools ==
This school board oversees 19 elementary schools, 4 secondary schools, 2 special education schools, and 5 adult and vocational centres, in which over 10,000 students are enrolled.

=== Elementary ===
- Boucherville Elementary School (Boucherville, Quebec)
- Cedar street (Beloeil, Quebec)
- Courtland Park International Elementary School (Saint-Bruno-de-Montarville, Quebec)
- Good Shepherd Elementary School (Brossard, Quebec)
- Greenfield Park Primary International School (Longueuil, Québec)
- Harold Napper Elementary School (Brossard, Quebec)
- Harold Sheppard Elementary School (Sorel-Tracy, Quebec)
- John Adam Elementary School (Delson, Quebec)
- Mount Bruno Elementary School (Saint-Bruno-de-Montarville, Quebec)
- Mountainview Elementary School (Otterburn Park, Quebec)
- Royal Charles Elementary School (Longueuil, Québec)
- St. John's School (Saint-Jean-sur-Richelieu, Quebec)
- St. Jude Elementary School (Longueuil, Quebec)
- St. Lambert Elementary School (Saint-Lambert, Quebec)
- St. Lawrence, building 002 (Champlain)(Candiac, Quebec)
- St. Lawrence, building 010 (St. Raymond) (Candiac, Quebec)
- St. Mary's Elementary School (Longueuil, Quebec)
- Terry Fox Elementary School (Longueuil, Quebec)
- William Latter Elementary School (Chambly, Quebec)

=== Secondary ===
- Centennial Regional High School (Longueuil, Québec)
- Saint-Lambert International High School, formerly Chambly County (Saint-Lambert, Quebec)
- Heritage Regional High School (Longueuil, Québec)
- St. John's School (Saint-Jean-sur-Richelieu, Quebec)

=== Other ===
- ACCESS Brossard - Language Centre (Brossard, Québec)
- ACCESS Cleghorn - Adult Education and Vocational Studies (Saint-Lambert, Québec)
- ACCESS Royal Oak - Vocational Studies (Saint-Hubert, Québec)
- ACCESS Darwin - Vocational Studies (Sainte-Julie, Québec)
- ACCESS Guimond - Vocational Studies (Longueuil, Québec)
- REACH (Saint-Lambert, Quebec)

== See also ==
- South Shore Protestant Regional School Board
- New Frontiers School Board
- Eastern Townships School Board
