= Groupe Serdy =

Canadian television company

- Industry: Media
- Headquarters: Longueuil, Quebec, Canada
- Key people: Sébastien Arsenault (President, CEO)
- Products: Broadcasting, television production
- Website: Groupe Serdy

Groupe Serdy is a Canadian television broadcasting and video production company based in Longueuil, Quebec.

== Assets ==
=== Television broadcasting ===
- Évasion: a specialty channel devoted to travel and adventure.
- Zeste: a specialty channel devoted to food.

=== Production ===
- idHD Studio: video production
- Serdy Video: video production

== Publishing ==
- Zeste: a food magazine modeled after the television channel of the same name.
