= Lambert projection =

There are several projections used in maps carrying the name of Johann Heinrich Lambert:

- Lambert cylindrical equal-area projection (preserves areas)
- Lambert azimuthal equal-area projection (preserves areas)
- Lambert conformal conic projection (preserves angles, commonly used in aviation navigation maps)
- Lambert equal-area conic projection (preserves areas)
