= Centre de services scolaire Marie-Victorin =

Centre de services scolaire Marie-Victorin (French pronunciation: [sɑ̃tʁ də sɛʁvis skɔlɛʁ maʁi viktɔʁɛ̃], CSSMV) is a French-language school service centre operating in the Province of Quebec, Canada and serving the tables of Longueuil (boroughs of Le Vieux-Longueuil, Saint-Hubert and Greenfield Park), Brossard and Saint-Lambert. CSSMV (previously known as "CSMV: Commission scolaire Marie-Victorin") was established on July 1, 1998, and became one of the most important school centres in Quebec. The board's headquarters are in Longueuil.

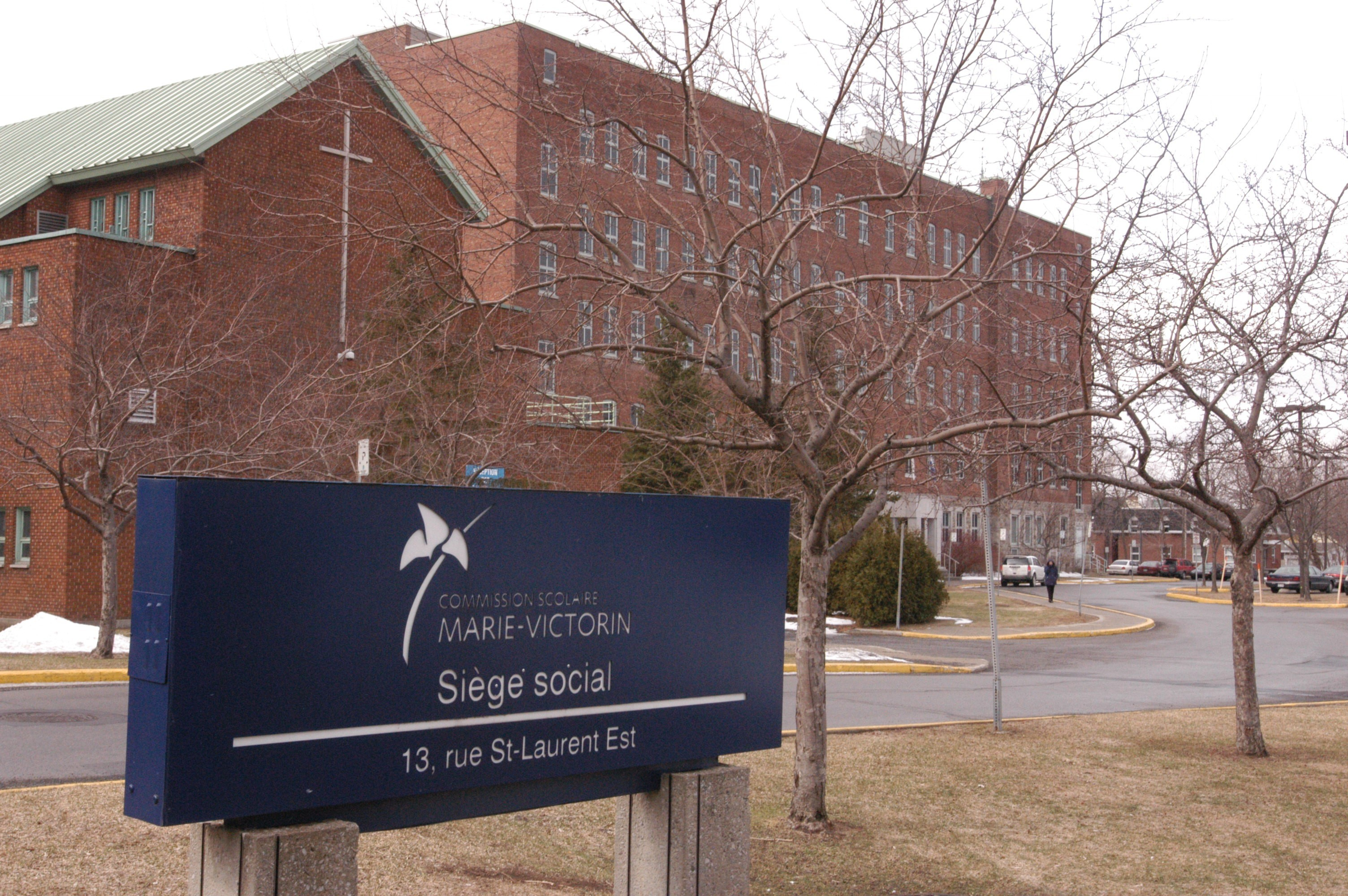
CSSMV's headquarters building located in Longueuil, Quebec, Canada.

CSSMV was created in 2020 when Commission scolaire Marie-Victorin school board was abolished according to Bill 40, which replaced all French school boards with service centres. The centre now serves 34,000 students and employs 4,500 people in 72 schools. About 53% of its clientele represents immigrants and 31,3% of students do not have French as their mother tongue.

The school board was named for Marie-Victorin Kirouac (1885-1944).

== District Brossard ==
=== Elementary schools ===
- Charles-Bruneau
- Georges-P.-Vanier
- Guillaume-Vignal
- Marie-Victorin
- Sainte-Claire
- Saint-Laurent
- Samuel-De Champlain
- Tourterelle
- Marcelle-Gauvreau

=== Secondary schools ===
- École secondaire Antoine-Brossard
- École internationale Lucille-Teasdale

== District St-Lambert ==
=== Elementary schools ===
- des Saints-Anges
- Préville
- Rabeau

== District Greenfield Park ==
=== Elementary schools ===
- Centre hospitalier Charles-LeMoyne
- École internationale de Greenfield Park
- Pierre-Laporte

=== Secondary school ===
- École secondaire Saint-Edmond

== District Saint-Hubert ==
=== Elementary schools ===
- Charles-LeMoyne
- de La Mosaïque
- De Maricourt
- des Mille-Fleurs
- des Quatre-Saisons
- D’Iberville
- du Jardin-Bienville
- Gaétan-Boucher
- Laurent-Benoît
- Maurice-L.-Duplessis
- Monseigneur-Forget
- Paul-Chagnon
- Saint-Joseph

=== Secondary schools ===
- École secondaire André-Laurendeau
- École secondaire Mgr-A.-M.-Parent
- École secondaire participative l’Agora

== District Le Vieux-Longueuil ==
=== Elementary schools ===
- Adrien-Gamache
- Armand-Racicot
- Bel-Essor
- Bourgeoys-Champagnat
- Carillon
- Christ-Roi
- de Normandie
- du Curé-Lequin
- du Tournesol
- École des Petits-Explorateurs
- Félix-Leclerc
- Gentilly
- Gentilly (Boisé des lutins)
- George-Étienne-Cartier
- Hubert-Perron
- Jacques-Ouellette
- Joseph-De-Sérigny
- Lajeunesse
- des Remparts
- Lionel-Groulx
- Marie-Victorin (Longueuil) Pavillon le Jardin
- Marie-Victorin (Longueuil) Pavillon l’Herbier
- Paul-De Maricourt
- Pierre-D’Iberville
- Sainte-Claire
- Saint-Jude
- Saint-Romain

=== Secondary schools ===
- École secondaire Gérard-Filion
- École secondaire Jacques-Rousseau
- École secondaire Saint-Jean-Baptiste
- École des Remparts (Le Vieux-Longueuil)
- Gérard-Filion (Pavillon l’Entre-Rives) (Le Vieux-Longueuil)
- École Jacques-Ouellette (Le Vieux-Longueuil)
- École régionale du Vent-Nouveau
