= Saint-Lambert International High School =

Location
- 675 Green; St. Lambert, Quebec, J4P 1V9; Canada; 45.5098°N 73.5044°W

Information
- School type: English International Baccalaureate Secondary School
- Religious affiliation: Secular (formerly Protestant)
- Founded: 1954
- School board: Riverside School Board
- Principal: Steve
- Grades: 7 to 11
- Enrollment: 367 students
- Language: English, French
- Area: St. Lambert.
- Colours: Black and Red
- Mascot: Cougar
- Team name: The Cougars

Saint-Lambert International High School (previously known as Chambly Academy or Chambly County High School) is a public secondary school, in Saint-Lambert, Quebec, Canada.

It is located at 675 Green Street and borders the Club De Golf St-Lambert. It is the only English-language secondary school in Saint Lambert and is part of the Riverside School Board. It offers an International Baccalaureate program, and has had a student population ranging from 400 to 750 students (during a baby boom peak in the early 1970s). The school is currently home to approximately 500 students.

== History ==
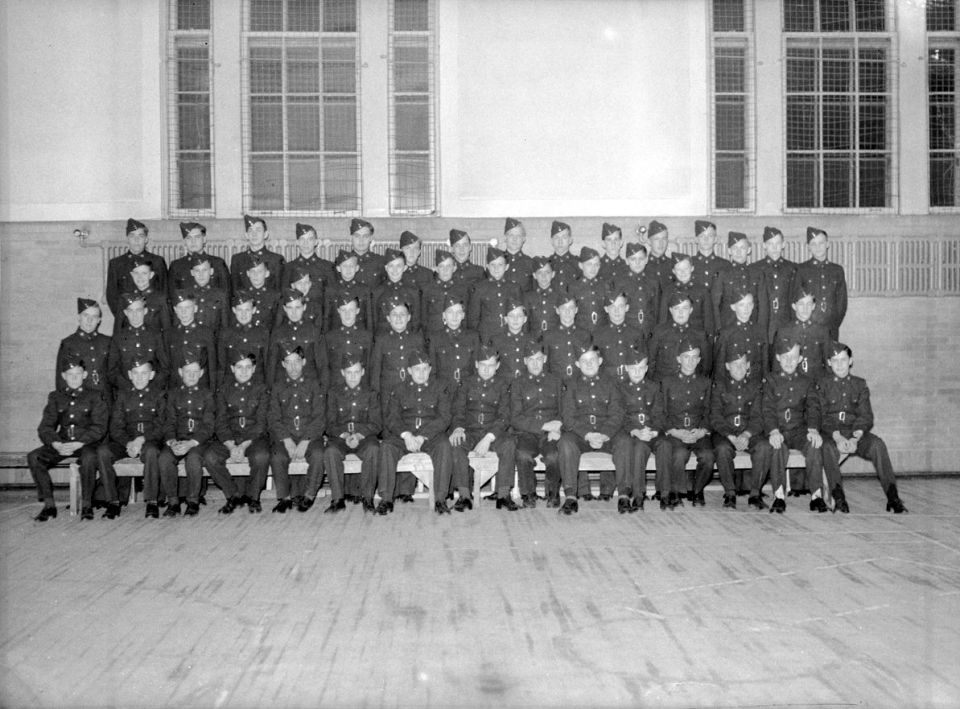
St-Lambert High School Air Cadets in 1942

The first St. Lambert High School was built on the corner of Green and Notre-Dame streets in 1896. In 1912, it was enlarged so that students from all of Chambly County could attend. Due to increased enrolment, the current building at 675 Green Street was opened in November 1954, and Chambly County High School became the first English language high school on the South Shore. In 1979, St. François-Xavier High School was opened in La Prairie, Quebec. In 1993, the students from St. Francois-Xavier were transferred to Penfield Academy, an institution named in honour of neurosurgeon Dr. Wilder Penfield.

In September 1999, Penfield Academy was merged with Chambly County High School. The combined school, named Chambly Academy, was located on the premises of Chambly County High School.

In 1976, facing space shortages, portable classrooms were built on the current location of the "F-wing". In 2001, these classrooms were destroyed and replaced with new portable classrooms which were built in 2002 and opened in the back of the current "E-wing". These classrooms served as temporary space, while four new permanent classrooms were constructed on the site of the destroyed portables at a cost of $1 million. The new classrooms were completed in 2004 and were shortly thereafter known as the "F-wing".

In 2007, a $1.5 Million general renovation project was undertaken by the Riverside School Board; classrooms, hallways, offices were all renovated. At the same time, with the collaboration of the provincial government, all science labs were rebuilt.

In late 2007, a long-standing sale of school land was approved by the city of Saint-Lambert. The proceeds from this sale ($5.4 Million) were used to further renovate and expand the school over the two next years.

By fall 2009, Chambly Academy's renovation and expansion work had been completed. The former gymnasium was converted into a cafeteria, the original cafeteria was transformed into a state of the art food preparation and serving area and the library was transformed into 2 additional classrooms. A new state of the art sports complex with a double gymnasium was built along with a new library and a new student services area.

On July 1, 2015, Chambly Academy was renamed Saint-Lambert International High School.

== Notable alumni ==
- Steve Kasper, professional hockey player
- Jim Munson, Canadian senator
- Todd Swift, writer
- David Christie, computer architect, co-architect AMD64 ISA
- Ali Hassan, comedian, author & broadcast personality
