= Lanctôt =

Lanctôt is a surname. Notable people with the surname include:

- Adélard Lanctôt (1874–1919), Canadian lawyer and politician
- Gustave Lanctot (1883–1975), Canadian historian and archivist
- Guylaine Lanctôt (1941–2025), Canadian phlebologist
- Hermine Lanctôt (1861-1943), Canadian author, journalist, and schoolteacher
- Jacques Lanctôt (born 1945), Canadian writer and convicted kidnapper
- Louise Lanctôt (born 1947), Canadian writer and convicted kidnapper
- Micheline Lanctôt (born 1947), Canadian actress, film director, screenwriter and musician
- Robert Lanctôt (born 1963), Canadian politician
- Roch Lanctôt (1866–1929), Canadian politician

== See also ==
- Lanquetot, French commune in département Seine-Maritime, Region Normandy
- Langtoft, England.
