= Alejandro Saravia =

Alejandro Saravia may refer to:

- Alejandro Saravia (chef) (born 1983), Peruvian chef
- Alejandro Saravia (writer) (born 1962), Bolivian-Canadian writer
