= Brossard =

- City
- Ville de Brossard
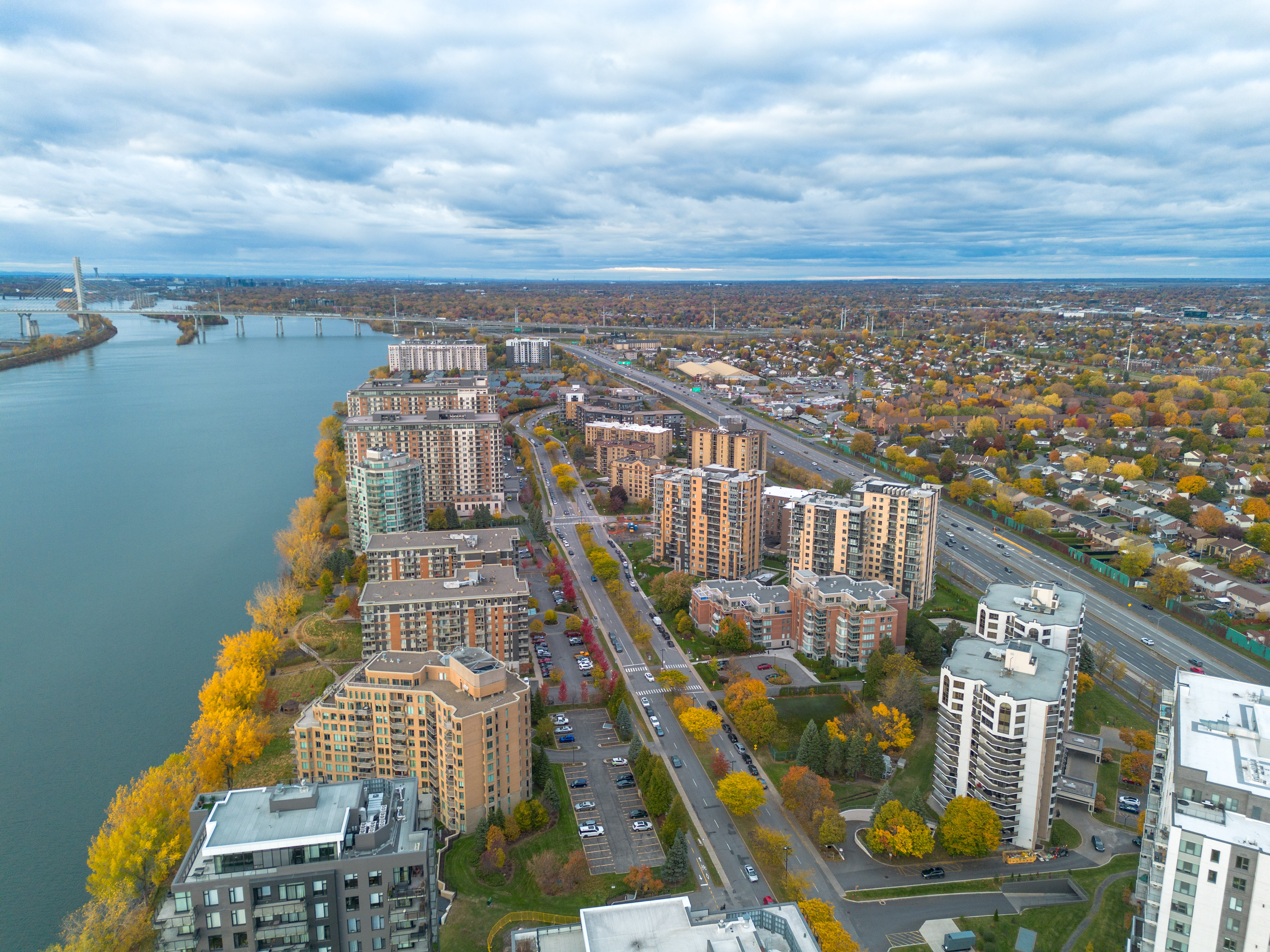
- Brossard in 2025

- Flag Coat of arms
- Motto: Si Je Puis Oultre
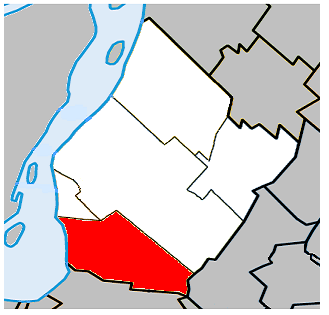
- Location within Urban Agglomeration of Longueuil.

- Location in southern Quebec.
- Coordinates: 45°28′N 73°27′W
- Country: Canada
- Province: Quebec
- Region: Montérégie
- RCM: None
- Agglomeration: Longueuil
- Founded: February 14, 1958
- Incorporated (city): 1978
- Amalgamated: January 1, 2002
- Reconstituted: January 1, 2006
- Founder: Georges-Henri Brossard
- Named for: Prominent family of the region and the city's founder

Government
  - Mayor: Doreen Assaad
  - Governing Body: Brossard City Council
  - MP: Alexandra Mendès (Brossard—Saint-Lambert, LPC)
  - MNA: Linda Caron (La Pinière, Québec Liberal Party); Isabelle Poulet (Laporte, Coalition Avenir Québec)

Area
  - Total: 52.20 km^{2} (20.15 sq mi)
  - Land: 45.19 km^{2} (17.45 sq mi)
  - Water: 13.60 km^{2} (5.25 sq mi)

Population (2021)
  - Total: 91,525
  - Density: 2,025.3/km^{2} (5,246/sq mi)
  - Change (2016–21): ▲6.8%
  - Dwellings: 37,275
- Time zone: UTC−5 (EST)
  - Summer (DST): UTC−4 (EDT)
- Postal code(s): J4W to J4Z
- Area codes: 450 and 579
- Highways A-10 A-15 A-20 A-30: R-132; R-134
- NTS Map: 31H6 Saint-Jean-sur-Richelieu
- GNBC Code: EQKVD
- Québec Geocode: 58007
- CLSC Territory: Brossard-Saint-Lambert (16052)
- Demonym: Brossardois(e)
- Rank: 67th
- Website: https://www.brossard.ca/

Brossard (/brɒˈsɑːr, ˈbrɒsɑːrd/ bross-AR, BROSS-ard, French: [bʁɔsaʁ], locally [bʁɔsɑːʁ, bʁɔsɑɔ̯ʁ]) is a municipality in the Montérégie region of Quebec, Canada and is part of the Greater Montreal area. According to the 2021 census, Brossard's population was 91,525. It shares powers with the urban agglomeration of Longueuil and was a borough of the municipality of Longueuil from 2002 to 2006.

According to the website of the city of Brossard, the municipality was named in honour of the Brossard family (the surname derives from a word meaning "brushwood"), a prominent settler family of the area whose presence was first attested in 1766. A member of this family, Georges-Henri Brossard, had been mayor of the predecessor parish municipality of La Prairie-de-la-Madeleine since 1944 and became the first mayor of Brossard.

Other names that were considered included Maisonneuve (which was also considered as a possible name for the Champlain Bridge), La Vérendrye, Marquetteville, or Forgetville. The latter name, in honour of the recently deceased Mgr. Anastase Forget, bishop of Saint-Jean; however, Premier Maurice Duplessis intervened, to avoid the connotations of the English word "forget," and the name Brossard was ultimately chosen.

== History ==
Logo of Brossard from 1983 to 2002

The city of Brossard was founded on February 14, 1958, and was before part of La Prairie-de-la-Madeleine Parish. Its first mayor was Georges-Henri Brossard. At the very beginning, there were 3,400 inhabitants.

The city has some homes dating from the eighteenth and nineteenth centuries, particularly along Prairies Road.

On August 8, 1964, a portion of land from Greenfield Park was added to Brossard. Furthermore, Notre-Dame-du-Sacré-Cœur was annexed to Brossard on March 25, 1978, becoming the "A" section to form the current city.

In the 1970s, an attempt was made by René Désourdy to construct a cemetery in Brossard. The attempt failed due to the water table being too high in most of the city, and as of 2026 Brossard has no cemetery.

Brossard was forcibly merged into the city of Longueuil on January 1, 2002, as a result of municipal reorganization in Quebec. and a demerger movement was started by Pierre Senécal, Jacques St-Amant and Gilles Larin which resulted in a municipal referendum, the largest demerger vote in Québec, that took place on June 20, 2004. 38.70% of the 50,539 qualified voters voted YES for demerger, which met the requirements (35% or more of total voting population) needed for de-amalgamation. As a result, Brossard would continue to be a borough of the city of Longueuil only until the end of 2005.

On January 1, 2006, Brossard was reconstituted as a city and Jean-Marc Pelletier was elected as the new mayor. However, Brossard still remains part of the urban agglomeration of Longueuil and thus, Brossard sits on the agglomeration council which determines certain powers of reconstituted cities.

On November 11, 2017, Doreen Assad was elected mayor of Brossard, the first woman of Egyptian descent to hold such position in Canada.

== Geography ==
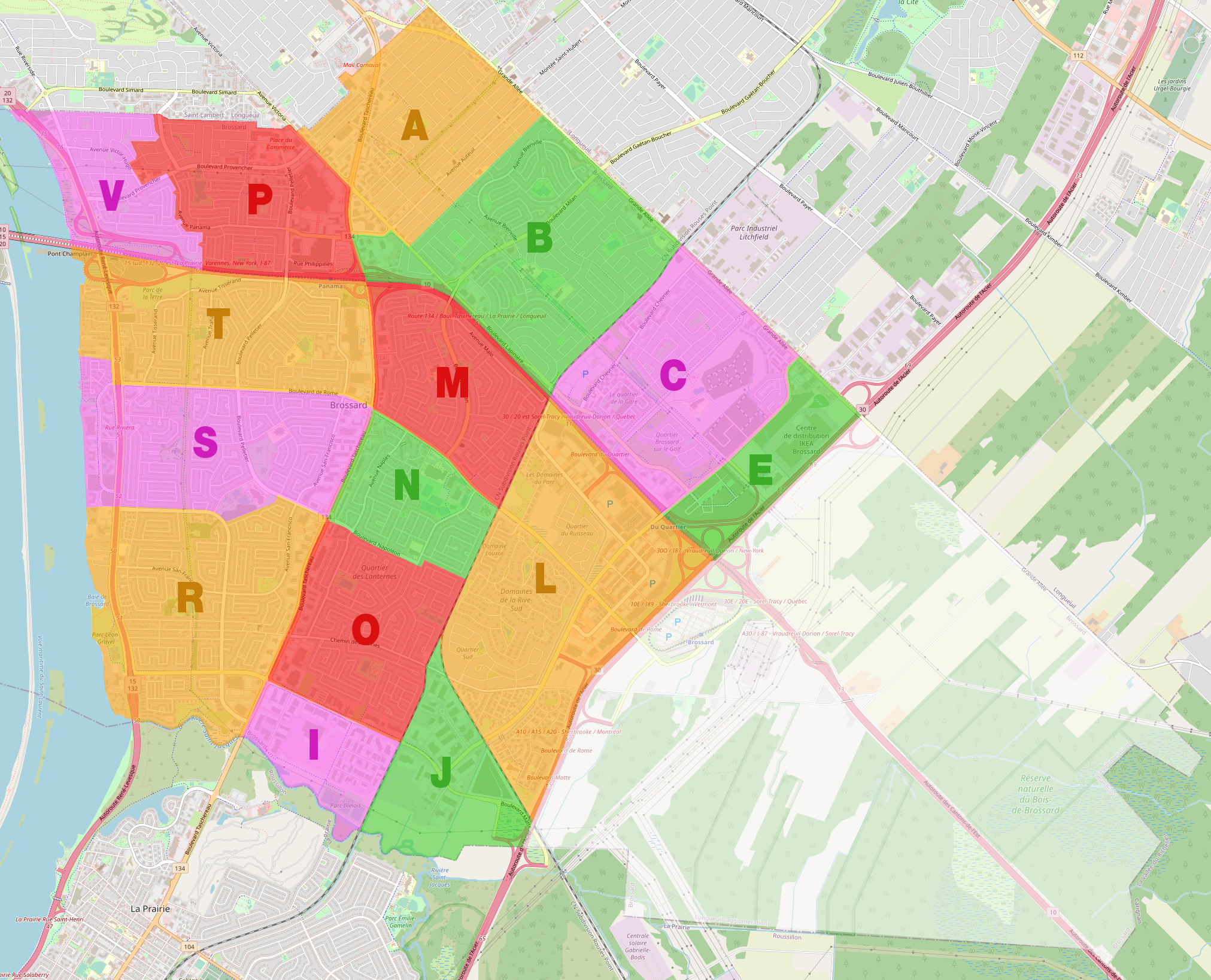
Map of the alphabetical sectors of Brossard. X and Y are not included and are to the southeast of Autoroute 30, east and west of Autoroute 10 respectively.

Brossard is surrounded by four municipalities on the South Shore of Montreal: Saint-Lambert, Longueuil (Borough of Greenfield Park and Borough of Saint-Hubert), Carignan and La Prairie. Brossard is situated on the Saint Lawrence River to the west and by the Saint-Jacques River to the south. (see Geographic location section below)

Many parks are scattered throughout the city of Brossard, including Parc écologique des Sansonnets. The parks are connected to the other areas of the city by about 37 km (23 miles) of biking paths. The city also has a municipal library building connected to its city hall building via an indoor passageway.

Brossard is subdivided into many smaller sections. These sections are characterized by having street names that all begin with the same letter of the alphabet. The only notable exceptions are few major arteries (such as Taschereau Boulevard and Rome Boulevard) that span across two or more sections. The lettered sectors were created under a 1960s planning and zoning scheme, pursuant to a guiding plan established by the engineering firm of Beauchemin, Beaton et Lapointe, and had the goal of easier wayfinding in the absence of a right-angled street grid. Some of the sectors correspond to former neighbourhoods or municipalities, as follows:

Sector	Original name
A	Saint-Alphonse, Notre-Dame-du-Sacré-Cœur
B	Vanier, Southgate
I	Parc Industriel
M	Aster, Asterville
O, R, S	Brosseau-Station
P, V	Marie-Victorin, Parkland
T	Champlain

Some constructions in the "A" and "R" sections of Brossard are older than the city itself because they were built in the former communities of Notre-Dame-du-Sacré Coeur and Brosseau Station, respectively. The "M" and "V" sections are the first neighbourhoods built after the inauguration of Brossard in 1958.

Two sparsely inhabited parts of Brossard, containing no streets other than main arteries and industrial roads, are arbitrarily called the "X" and "Y" sections.

=== Climate ===
Climate data for Montreal Saint-Hubert Longueuil Airport
Month	Jan	Feb	Mar	Apr	May	Jun	Jul	Aug	Sep	Oct	Nov	Dec	Year
Mean daily maximum °C (°F)	−5.6 (21.9)	−3.2 (26.2)	2.3 (36.1)	11.3 (52.3)	19.1 (66.4)	23.8 (74.8)	26.6 (79.9)	25.4 (77.7)	20.5 (68.9)	13 (55)	5.6 (42.1)	−1.5 (29.3)	11.4 (52.6)
Mean daily minimum °C (°F)	−15.1 (4.8)	−13.1 (8.4)	−7.3 (18.9)	0.1 (32.2)	6.7 (44.1)	11.9 (53.4)	14.8 (58.6)	13.6 (56.5)	8.8 (47.8)	2.7 (36.9)	−2.6 (27.3)	−10.1 (13.8)	0.9 (33.6)
Source: Environment Canada

== Demographics ==
Historical populations
Year	Pop.	±%
1956	3,590	—
1961	3,778	+5.2%
1966	11,884	+214.6%
1971	23,452	+97.3%
1976	37,641	+60.5%
1981*	52,232	+38.8%
1986	57,441	+10.0%
1991	64,793	+12.8%
1996	65,927	+1.8%
2001	65,026	−1.4%
2006	71,154	+9.4%
2011	79,273	+11.4%
2016	85,721	+8.1%
2021	91,525	+6.8%
(*) Brossard annexed the Municipality of Notre-Dame.

In the 2021 Census of Population conducted by Statistics Canada, Brossard had a population of 91,525 living in 35,885 of its 37,275 total private dwellings, a change of 6.8% from its 2016 population of 85,721. With a land area of 45.19 km^{2} (17.45 sq mi), it had a population density of 2,025.3/km^{2} (5,245.6/sq mi) in 2021.

=== Language ===
==== Mother tongue ====
Mother tongue languages

Statistics for the population according to mother tongue (the first language learned and still remembered) vary significantly from the statistics for home language (the language spoken most often at home), as well as also varying significantly from the statistics for official language usage.

Mother Tongue (2021)	Population	Percentage
French	35,285	39.0%
English	10,545	11.7%
English and French	1,915	2.1%
French and a non-official language	1,730	1.9%
English and a non-official language	1,490	1.6%
English, French and a non-official language	1,045	1.2%
Mandarin	6,530	7.2%
Spanish	5,090	5.6%
Arabic	4,855	5.4%
Yue	4,785	5.3%
Dari	1,660	1.8%
Vietnamese	1,520	1.7%
Romanian	1,240	1.4%
Iranian Persian	1,045	1.2%
Greek	1,015	1.1%
Portuguese	1,000	1.1%
Russian	935	1.0%
Italian	625	0.7%
Morisyen	545	0.6%
Urdu	530	0.6%
Bengali	430	0.5%
Bulgarian	385	0.4%
Haitian Creole	370	0.4%
Korean	370	0.4%
Punjabi	345	0.4%
Tagalog	345	0.4%

Mother tongue language
Canada Census Mother Tongue – Brossard, Quebec
Census	Total	French			English			French & English			Other		
Year	Responses	Count	Trend	Pop %	Count	Trend	Pop %	Count	Trend	Pop %	Count	Trend	Pop %
2021	90,470	35,285	▼5.6%	39.0%	10,545	▲6.9%	11.7%	1,915	▲53.2%	2.1%	38,160	▲14.9%	42.2%
2016	84,480	37,385	▲0.1%	44.3%	9,865	▲4.3%	11.7%	1,250	▲10.1%	1.5%	33,215	▲15.9%	39.3%
2011	78,835	37,340	▲5.2%	47.4%	9,460	▲6.5%	12.0%	1,135	▲97.4%	1.4%	28,665	▲17.5%	36.4%
2006	70,740	35,510	▼2.0%	50.2%	8,885	▼1.1%	12.6%	575	▼20.0%	0.8%	24,385	▲26.6%	34.5%
2001	64,655	36,235	▼1%	56.0%	8,985	▼6.6%	13.7%	690	▼23.1%	1.1%	17,890	▲2.2%	27.7%
1996	65,927	36,615	n/a	55.5%	9,575	n/a	14.5%	850	n/a	1.3%	17,505	n/a	26.6%

==== Spoken at home ====
Aside from French, a variety of other languages are spoken in Brossard on a daily basis, as according to the 2021 census. The prominent languages spoken primarily at home and their relative share are French (43%), English (18%), Mandarin (6%), Yue (4%), Spanish (4%) and Arabic (3%).

=== Ethnicity ===
Brossard is among the most multicultural municipalities in Greater Montreal, as there are 30 ethnic groups that represent at least 1% of the population. According to the 2021 census the prominent ethnic groups and their relative share are Chinese (16%), French (14%), Canadian (13%). Québécois (5%) and Irish (4%)

Panethnic groups in the City of Brossard (2001–2021)
Panethnic group	2021		2016		2011		2006		2001	
Panethnic group	Pop.	%	Pop.	%	Pop.	%	Pop.	%	Pop.	%
European (Note: Statistic includes all persons that did not make up part of a visible minority or an indigenous identity.)	43,850	49.19%	47,575	56.64%	48,310	61.32%	46,255	65.39%	46,580	72.04%
East Asian (Note: Statistic includes total responses of "Chinese", "Korean", and "Japanese" under visible minority section on census.)	15,095	16.93%	12,345	14.7%	10,195	12.94%	8,255	11.67%	6,600	10.21%
Middle Eastern (Note: Statistic includes total responses of "West Asian" and "Arab" under visible minority section on census.)	9,750	10.94%	7,080	8.43%	5,715	7.25%	4,245	6%	2,340	3.62%
African	5,760	6.46%	4,360	5.19%	3,335	4.23%	2,445	3.46%	2,615	4.04%
Latin American	4,615	5.18%	3,600	4.29%	2,475	3.14%	2,145	3.03%	1,320	2.04%
South Asian	4,440	4.98%	3,910	4.65%	3,420	4.34%	3,805	5.38%	2,590	4.01%
Southeast Asian (Note: Statistic includes total responses of "Filipino" and "Southeast Asian" under visible minority section on census.)	3,305	3.71%	3,190	3.8%	3,575	4.54%	2,755	3.89%	1,985	3.07%
Other/multiracial (Note: Statistic includes total responses of "Visible minority, n.i.e." and "Multiple visible minorities" under visible minority section on census.)	1,880	2.11%	1,560	1.86%	1,460	1.85%	645	0.91%	425	0.66%
Indigenous	465	0.52%	370	0.44%	310	0.39%	185	0.26%	195	0.3%
Total responses	89,140	97.39%	84,000	97.99%	78,785	99.38%	70,740	99.42%	64,655	99.43%
Total population	91,525	100%	85,721	100%	79,273	100%	71,154	100%	65,026	100%
Note: Totals greater than 100% due to multiple origin responses

Major ethnic groups in the City of Brossard (2021 census)
Chinese	15.8%
French	13.5%
Canadian	12.7%
Québécois	4.7%
Irish	3.8%
Italian	3.6%
French Canadian	3.4%
Arab	2.9%
Vietnamese	2.6%
Indian	2.5%
English	2.1%
Scottish	2.1%
Greek	2.1%
Afghan	1.9%
Spanish	1.8%
Haitian	1.8%
Moroccan	1.8%
Romanian	1.7%
Lebanese	1.6%
Colombian	1.6%
Iranian	1.5%
German	1.5%
Portuguese	1.4%
Egyptian	1.4%
African	1.3%
Russian	1.3%
Pakistani	1.2%
Algerian	1.1%
Polish	1.1%
Filipino	1.0%
Note: Percentages are calculated as a proportion of the total number of respondents and may total more than 100% due to dual responses. All ethnocultural ancestries of more than 1% are listed in the table above according to the exact terminology used by Statistics Canada.

=== Housing ===
Brossard is a mainly residential suburb with a moderate diversity of structural styles. The most popular styles of housing are semi-detached houses which represent 44% of private dwellings and apartment buildings with fewer than five storeys which represent 31% of private dwellings.

== Economy ==
Brossard is the commercial hub of the south shore, most businesses located along Taschereau Boulevard, inside Champlain Mall and Place Portobello or at the lifestyle centre, Quartier DIX30. A particular segment of Taschereau Boulevard near La Prairie and the Saint-Jacques River is home to a large concentration of car dealerships offering most available makes and models.

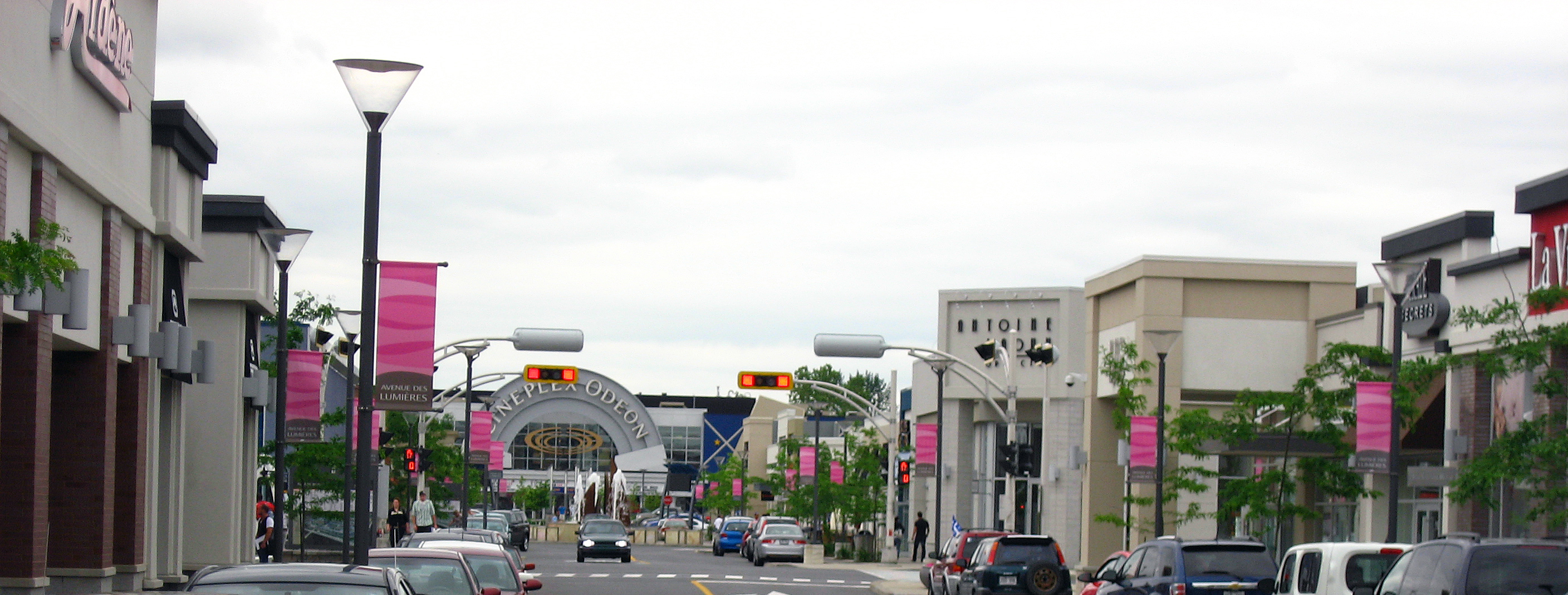
Shops at Quartier Dix30.

== Arts and culture ==
Brossard has a cultural scene influenced by its population. The city hosts cultural events, including music festivals, art exhibitions, and theater performances. Brossard's cultural facilities include museums, galleries, and historical sites.

Brossard is home of many festivities:

- New Year's Get-Together with Municipal Officers (January)
- Fest-Hiver (February)
- Gala de l'action bénévole (May)
- Journée de l'animal de compagnie (May)
- Journée nationale du sport et de l'activité physique (May)
- Fête nationale (June)
- Fête du voisinage (June)
- L'OSM dans les parcs (July)
- Demi-Marathon Sun Life de Brossard (August)
- Festin culturel (August)
- Jour de l'arbre (August)
- Perform'ART (September)
- La Grande marche de Brossard (October)
- Marché de Noël de Brossard (November)
- La Grande Guignolée des médias de la Rive-Sud (December)
- Saute à l'eau! (December)

== Sports ==
Soccer

L'association de soccer de Brossard has been given exclusive authority from the City of Brossard to organize recreational and competitive soccer primarily for youth (ages 4 to 18). Programs are also offered for adults. The Association is affiliated with FIFA via the Canadian and Quebec Provincial soccer federations.

The sport is amongst the most popular in the city given it is quite accessible (i.e. very little equipment required) and the continued increase in popularity of the sport in North America. Consequently, there are more than 2,500 annual registrations of which approximately one third are for the winter season and the rest for the summer season. The summer program is run on the various soccer fields in the city. The winter program is held indoors, at the CN Sports Complex and at various gyms in the schools within the city boundaries. Notorious footballers from Brossard includes former Canadian national team player Patrice Bernier and ex bundesliga striker Olivier Occean.

The Association also hosts the Brossard Challenge tournament during the first weekend in August every year. The tournament attracts teams from all areas of the province of Quebec. There are also teams from outside Quebec, mainly Ontario.

Ice Hockey

The CN Sports Complex is a multipurpose sports facility located in Brossard that contains two ice hockey rinks and one indoor soccer pitch. It is used as the official practice facility of the National Hockey League's Montreal Canadiens.

Brossard is home to the Brossard Mustangs and the Brossard Flames in the Ligue de Hockey Junior A Rive-Sud.

Figure Skating

Figure skating in Brossard is very popular amongst children of all ages. The Brossard Figure Skating Club (Brossard FSC) is the only organization to provide figure skating lessons in accordance with Skate Canada's standards in the city of Brossard.

Lessons and ice-time are held at the CN Sports Complex facilities, a facility built for the NHL's Montreal Canadiens as a practice and fitness centre, as well as the Michel-Normandin Arena, named after Michel Normandin, a famous Montreal sports announcer.

Brossard FSC offers training for various groups of age and skill, available to the city's population. Its CanSkate 3–5 program offers weekly beginner lessons for children aged 3–5. The Brossard FSC also administers the Skate Canada program to skaters aged 5 and above in group lessons, semi-private lessons, private lessons, and offers specialized development opportunities and free extra ice-time for more advanced skaters. Finally, every few months, Brossard coordinates a series of tests for its more advanced skaters to have certain skills assessed by certified judges and therefore be able to move-up levels in order to learn and practice more advanced skills.

Brossard FSC is known for its annual Ice Show, attracting sponsors and spectators to hold four representations of the show each year. This event occurs at the end of the winter season, and is the biggest event of the FSC. The celebration invites any young skaters to perform in costumed, decorated light shows, with their routines being choreographed by the club's Skate Canada certified coaches, to music of a chosen theme.The 43rd edition of this showcase was held in April 2014.

One of the club's most famous skaters is Sébastien Britten, he was "the 1995 Canadian national champion. He represented Canada at the 1994 Winter Olympics, where he placed 10th. In 1998, he beat several Olympic and World medallists to win the 1998 World Professional Figure Skating Championships held in Jaca, Spain. Following his retirement from competitive skating [in 1997], he began working as a coach and choreographer".

Baseball

Brossard fields teams in Quebec's Little League Baseball system at various age levels. It hosted the 2004 Canadian Little League Baseball Tournament at Marie Victorin Park.

Softball

City Leagues includes:

- Chimo, founded in 1979
- PVB (Petit Vieux de Brossard) which has divisions for men over 45 and for women

== Government ==
=== Municipal ===
The mayor of the City of Brossard is Doreen Assaad. There are 12 city councillors in the Brossard City Council.

List of mayors of Brossard
Years in office	Mayor	Party
1958–1967	Georges-Henri Brossard	—
1967–1978	Léon Gravel	Équipe Populaire de Brossard
1978–1982	Alphonse Lepage	Équipe Populaire de Brossard
1982–1983	Claude Chevrier	Équipe Populaire de Brossard
1983–1990	Georgette Lepage	Équipe Populaire de Brossard
1990–2001	Paul Leduc	Équipe Populaire de Brossard
January 1, 2002 – December 31, 2005	Nicole Carrier (Brossard borough president in Longueuil)	Parti Municipal Rive Sud
2006–2009	Jean-Marc Pelletier	Brossard Democracy
2009–2017	Paul Leduc	Priority Brossard
2017–Present	Doreen Assaad	Brossard Ensemble

Brossard City Council
District number	Sections	Councillor
District 1	C,L	Christian Gaudette
District 2	C,B	Barbara Vafopoulos
District 3	B	Tina Del Vecchio
District 4	A	Stéphanie Quintal
District 5	P,V	Diane Alexander
District 6	T	Nicolas Thomas
District 7	R,S	Sophie Allard
District 8	R	Antoine Assaf
District 9	I,N,O	Patrick Langlois
District 10	J,L	Louis-Philippe Latour
District 11	N,M	Michael Forian
District 12	S	Daniel Lucier

=== Federal and provincial ===
The city of Brossard is located in the federal riding of Brossard—Saint-Lambert, and its Member of Parliament is Alexandra Mendès of the Liberal Party of Canada. In the past three elections, the Liberals have carried the riding by wide margins.

In provincial politics, Brossard forms part of the La Pinière riding and its Member of the National Assembly is Gaetan Barrette of the Quebec Liberal Party. The La Pinière riding is heavily Liberal in provincial elections, with their candidates obtaining wide margins against the other major provincial parties. In 2017, Laporte riding was extended and now cover the north-eastern part of the territory.

== Infrastructure ==
=== Roads ===
Brossard is serviced by Autoroutes 10 (Autoroute des Cantons-de-l'Est), 15, 20 (Autoroute Jean-Lesage), and 30 (Autoroute de l'Acier), as well as Routes 132 and 134 (Taschereau Boulevard). Autoroute 30 runs along the west side of Brossard. Along the Saint Lawrence River on the east side of the city, Autoroutes 15 and 20 overlap with Route 132; 15 to the south and 20 to the north. At the Champlain Bridge interchange, Autoroutes 15 and 20 overlap 10 and feed into the Champlain Bridge, which crosses over into Montreal. Autoroute 10 also meets with Route 134 at the Taschereau Interchange which runs north south through the heart of Brossard.

Other important roads include Taschereau Boulevard, Rome Boulevard, Milan Boulevard, Matte Boulevard, Pelletier Boulevard, Lapinière Boulevard (known as Victoria Avenue in Saint-Lambert and Greenfield Park), San Francisco-Tisserand-Stravinski Avenues loop, Panama Avenue — Auteuil Avenue, Provencher Boulevard and Chemin des Prairies.

=== Public transit ===
Brossard is served by three Réseau express métropolitain stations; Panama, Du Quartier and Brossard, since July 31, 2023.

The Réseau de transport de Longueuil (RTL) serves much of Brossard's territory as well as the rest of the South Shore with buses. Exo runs buses to other Montréal suburbs as far as Saint-Hyacinthe from Panama and Brossard stations.

Brossard is in the ARTM's B fare zone.

== Education ==
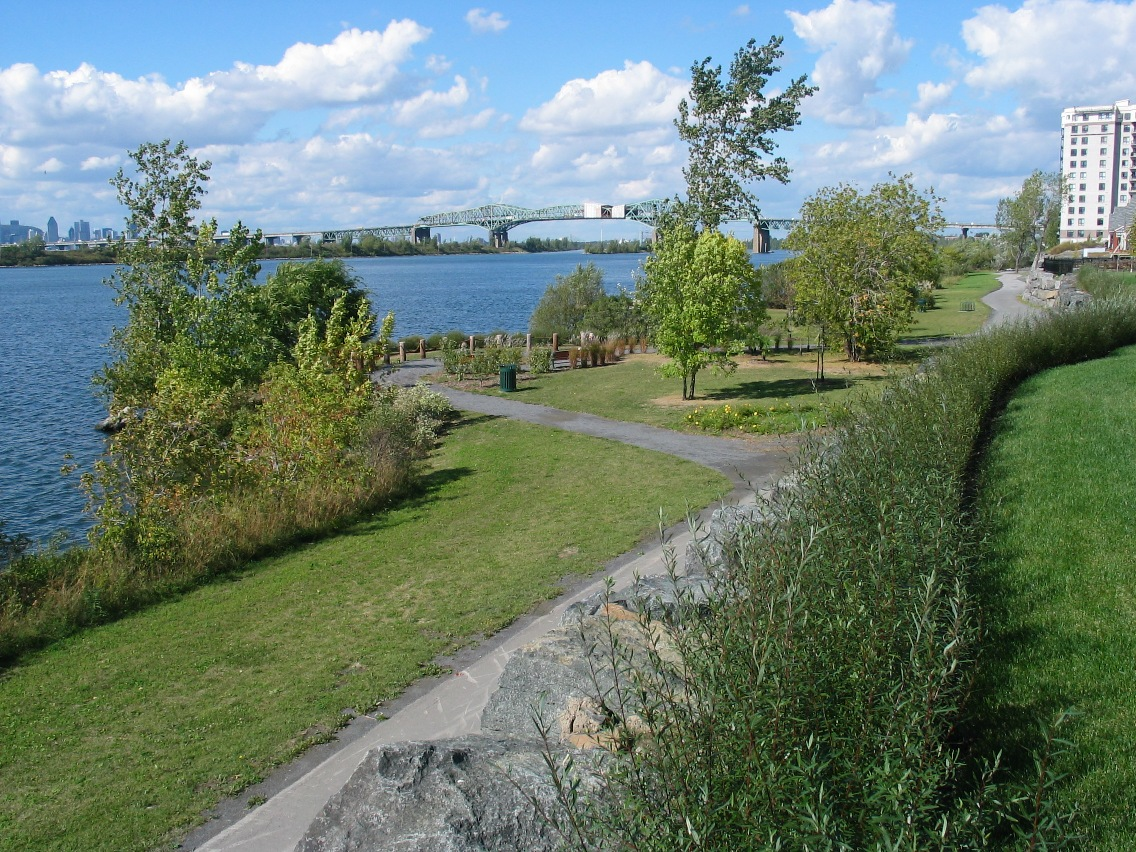
The Saint Lawrence River and the Champlain Bridge.

The Commission scolaire Marie-Victorin operates French-language public schools.

Secondary:

- École Secondaire Antoine-Brossard
- École internationale Lucille-Teasdale (formerly École Secondaire Pierre-Brosseau)

Primary:

- Académie Marie-Laurier
- École Primaire Charles-Bruneau
- École Primaire Georges-P.-Vanier
- École Primaire Guillaume-Vignal
- École Primaire Marie-Victorin (Brossard)
- École de la Rose-des-Vents (Brossard)
- École Primaire Sainte-Claire (Brossard)
- École Primaire Saint-Laurent
- École Primaire Samuel-De Champlain (Brossard)
- École Primaire Tourterelle

The Riverside School Board operates English public schools.

Primary schools:

- Good Shepherd Elementary School
- Harold Napper Elementary School

Previously the South Shore Protestant Regional School Board operated Protestant public schools in Brossard.

=== Adult education ===
- ACCESS Career Centre
- CEA Antoine-Brossard

== Notable people ==
- Patrice Bernier, retired soccer player
- François Bouchard, retired ice hockey defenceman
- Marlène Harnois, taekwondo Olympic medalist and a Knight of the Order of Merit.
- Louis-José Houde, actor and comedian
- Anthony Kavanagh, standup comedian
- Stéphanie Lapointe, singer and the winner of the second season of Star Académie
- Olivier Occéan, retired soccer player and current assistant coach of IF Urædd
- Alejandro Saravia, writer
- Claudia Bouvette, singer, songwriter and actress

== See also ==
- List of anglophone communities in Quebec
- List of cities in Quebec
- Municipal reorganization in Quebec
- Saint Jacques River (Roussillon)
