= Notre-Dame-du-Sacré-Cœur =

Coordinates: 45.474427°N 73.455062°W

Notre-Dame-du-Sacré-Cœur (French pronunciation: [nɔtʁə dam dy sakʁe kœʁ]; also known as Notre-Dame) was a small municipality in southwestern Quebec, Canada, three kilometres (2 miles) from the southern shore of the Saint Lawrence River. It was a suburb of Montreal until it was annexed to the city of Brossard in 1978.

The boundaries of Notre-Dame-du-Sacré-Coeur were fairly simple as the municipality had the exact shape of a rectangle. Today, its former location corresponds to the western part of the A section of Brossard; which is bordered by Alain street to the northwest, Grande-Allée Boulevard to the northeast, Baillargeon street to the southeast and Lapinière Boulevard to the southwest.

== History ==
Notre-Dame-du-Sacré-Cœur was formed from the Municipalité de la Paroisse de La Prairie de la Magdeleine in 1950. James Darby was the last mayor of this city, from 1967 to 1978.

On March 25, 1978, Notre-Dame-du-Sacré-Cœur was annexed to the city of Brossard to solve the problem of providing sufficient services to and maintaining an adequate municipal government for such a small geographical area. Notre-Dame had strong ties with the city of Brossard as its territory was almost completely surrounded by Brossard and its schools were served by the Brossard school board.

Immediately following the merger, the streets of Notre-Dame-du-Sacré-Cœur were renamed and integrated into the A section of Brossard.

James-Darby Park in Brossard (located at the intersection of Asselin and Anthony streets) is named in honour of the last mayor of Notre-Dame-du-Sacré-Cœur. The park includes a basketball court and a pétanque playing area.

== Government ==
Notre-Dame was governed by a mayor and six councillors elected every 2 years.

Despite being a small municipality, Notre-Dame had its own police service.

The city hall of Notre-Dame-du-Sacré-Coeur was located on Domville street.

== Education ==
Notre-Dame-du-Sacré-Coeur was served by two Catholic primary schools: Notre-Dame and St-Michel.

Notre-Dame school was located on Riendeau street. St-Michel school was located on Pauline street.

Both schools were handled by the Brossard school board.

== Street name changes ==
Notre Dame	Brossard
Booker	Anthony
Domville	Alexandre
Pauline	Aline
Riendeau	Auteuil
Stedman	Auclair
Sylvain	Alain
5th av	Grande-Allée
6th av	Aubry
7th av	Arpin
8th av	Asselin
9th av	Alarie
10th av	Audette

* Note: 5th avenue was renamed Grande-Allée in 1971.

== See also ==
- Brossard
  - History of Brossard
