= Euclide Sicotte =

Canadian priest and photographer

- Born: Joseph Euclide Anselme Sicotte; August 12, 1901; La Prairie, Quebec, Canada
- Died: December 23, 1969 (aged 68); Montreal, Quebec, Canada
- Other name: Cicot (art name)
- Occupations: Priest, Photographer

Euclide Sicotte (12 August 1901 – 23 December 1969), art name Cicot, was a Canadian priest and photographer from Quebec.

== Biography ==
Joseph Euclide Anselme Sicotte was born on 12 August 1901 in La Prairie, Quebec to Herménégilde Sicotte, a baker, and Euchariste Normandin. He had his classical courses between 1912 and 1920. He was ordained priest on 29 May 1926 with his brother Anthime.

In September 1926, he was named master-supervisor and mathematics teacher at the Collège de Montréal. He became a teacher of physical and natural sciences in 1931. In 1934, he invented a planisphere named the "Cherche-étoiles" (Star-searcher). He published a textbook, Premières notions de physique.

Sicotte studied drawing at the École des Beaux-Arts de Montréal. In 1940, he started studying piano and organ. He composed organ accompaniments for gregorian chants. He also gave music classes and uncovered the talent of some of his students, including Jacques Beaudry, Jean Leduc and Gilles Manny.

He also grew impassioned with photography. His photographs were used by newspapers, magazines, company publications, textbooks and calendars. Between 1945 and 1969, he made 10 078 photographs. These are preserved at the National Archives in Montreal

He likely travelled to Europe for the first time in 1929. Between 1945 and 1960, he travelled in Europe, Mexico, Guatemala, Haiti, the United States and Western Canada. In the 1950s, he gave conferences in colleges and seminaries with photographs taken during these travels. He also photographed Quebec.

In 1950 he left the Collège de Montréal to become chaplain at the Juvénat Mont-La-Mennais of Oka. Between 1951 and 1957, he was chaplain at the Collège Villa-Maria.

From 1957 until his death, he was priest at the Saint-Jean-Gualbert parish, in Laval-sur-le-Lac, Laval.

Sicotte died on 23 December 1969 in Montreal.
