= Parc écologique des Sansonnets =

Nature reserve in Brossard, Quebec

Coordinates: 45.451378°N 73.477153°W

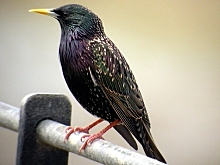
L'étourneau sansonnet or common starling, a bird that is typically found in this park.

Parc écologique des Sansonnets or Parc Sansonnets (English: Ecological Park of the Starlings) is a forested natural reserve located in Brossard, Quebec. As a rare example of a mature deciduous forest in the suburbs of Montreal, it covers 14.1 acres (57,000 m^{2}) in the S section of Brossard and is located at the southeast corner of the intersection of Saguenay Avenue and Pelletier Boulevard (adjacent to the residential streets of Sorel and Suède and Saint-Laurent Primary School). Numerous footpaths start from these major streets to provide access to the inner parts of this park.

This park was officially recognized by the city of Brossard as a natural reserve on September 14, 1981. It was named after a species of bird that is common to this area: l'étourneau sansonnet (common starling or Sturnus vulgaris).

The dominant tree in this forest is the northern red oak. Red maple is also abundant. Two species uncommon in Quebec are present: shagbark hickory in the tree canopy and mayapple in the understory. Poison ivy also occurs in the understory, along with various species of moss and mushroom. The soil is an imperfectly drained loamy sand podzol, mapped as Saint-Damase series.
