= Saint Jacques River =

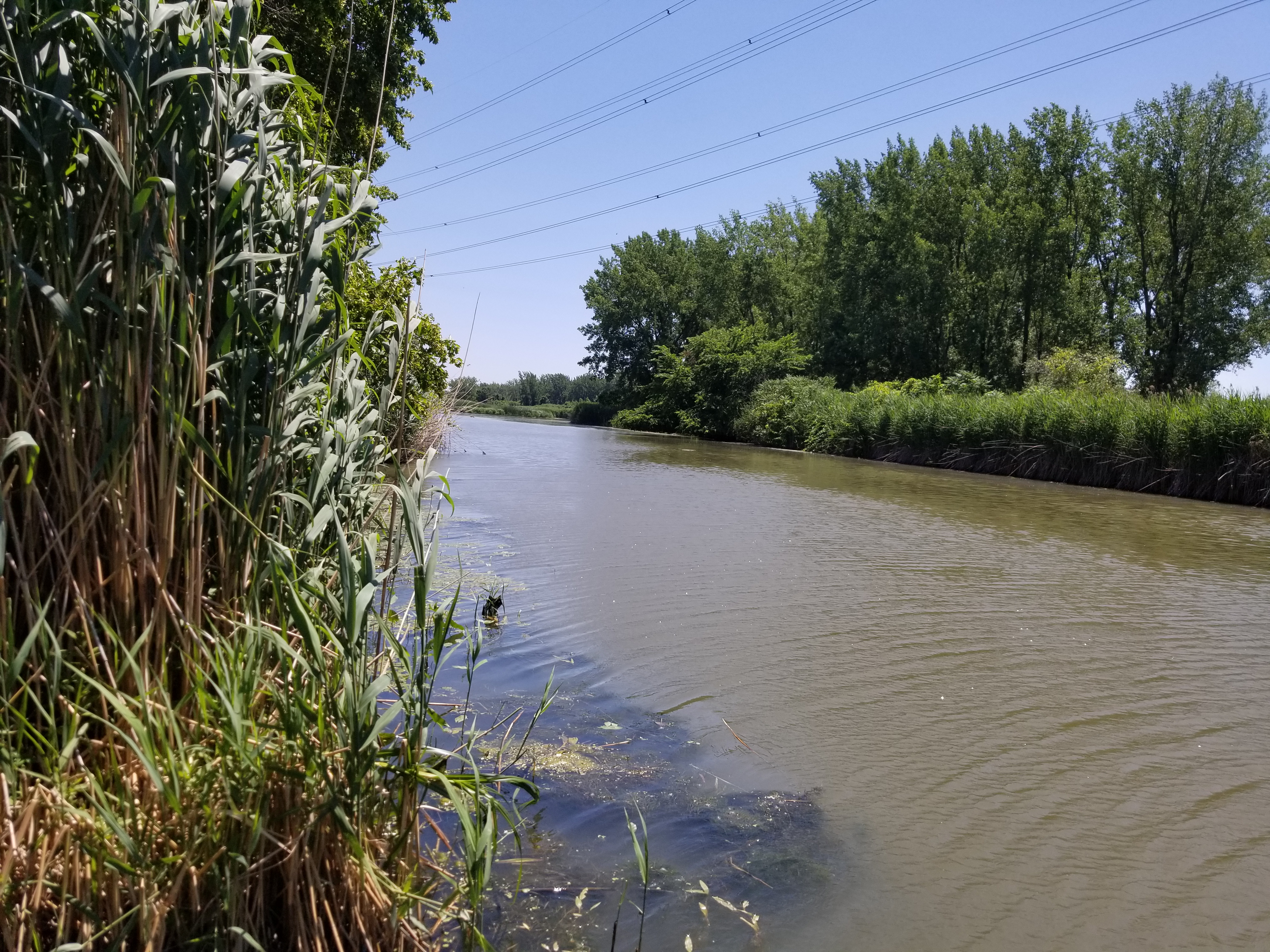

Location
- Countries: Canada
- Provinces and territories of Canada: Quebec
- Administrative region: Montérégie

Physical characteristics
- Source
  - location: Saint-Jacques-le-Mineur, Quebec
  - elevation: 56 m (184 ft)
- Mouth
  - location: Laprairie
  - elevation: 11 m (36 ft)
- Length: 33.1 km (20.6 mi)

Basin features
- Tributaries
  - left: (upstream) Saint-André creek, Des Trente Creek, Des Quinze Creek, Maréchal creek, Pagé creek.
  - right: (upstream) Daigneault fosée, Des Prairies creek, Des Bois Creek, Lussier-Dupuis creek, Bergeron creek, Bachand creek, Saint-Marc creek.

Saint-Jacques River is a river in southwestern Quebec, Canada that drains the Saint Lawrence Lowlands. It flows in a general south to north direction, from the area around Saint-Jacques-le-Mineur (in Les Jardins-de-Napierville) to its mouth in the Saint Lawrence River, at the border between the cities of Brossard and La Prairie.

== Geography ==
The Saint-Jacques River meanders through the agricultural and forested lowlands of the Montérégie region near the Saint Lawrence River. As a result, it flows through and drains areas of sparse and dense population like agricultural towns and suburban cities on the south shore of the Island of Montreal.

The main hydrographic slopes near the Saint-Jacques River are:

- north side: Prairie Creek;
- east side: Acadia River, Lécuyer watercourse;
- south side: Saint-André Creek, Acadia River;
- west side: St. Lawrence Seaway, St. Lawrence River. The Saint-Jacques River has its source of a set of agricultural streams draining the area south of the municipality of Saint-Jacques-le-Mineur, Quebec and west of the watershed with the slope hydrographic survey of the Acadia River.

Course from the head (26.1 km, 16-mile segment)

The Saint-Jacques River flows first on 8.6 kilometres (5.3 mi) to the north, passing west of the village of Saint-Jacques-le-Mineur, Quebec, until the Méchal Creek mouth (coming from the southwest). In this first segment, it passes in the rank Saint-Philippe-Nord and Saint-Marc. Then, the river flows on the northwest to the village of Saint-Philippe-de-Laprairie which it crosses in serpentine fashion. From this village, the river flows northwest (3.4 kilometres (2.1 mi) serpentine to the mouth of Saint-André Creek (coming from the southwest). Then the river runs north on Autoroute 30 (east side) winding on 8.6 kilometres (5.3 mi) to the northeast in agricultural zones in the rang Saint-Joseph-Nord in the Town of La Prairie, Quebec, to the Autoroute 10.

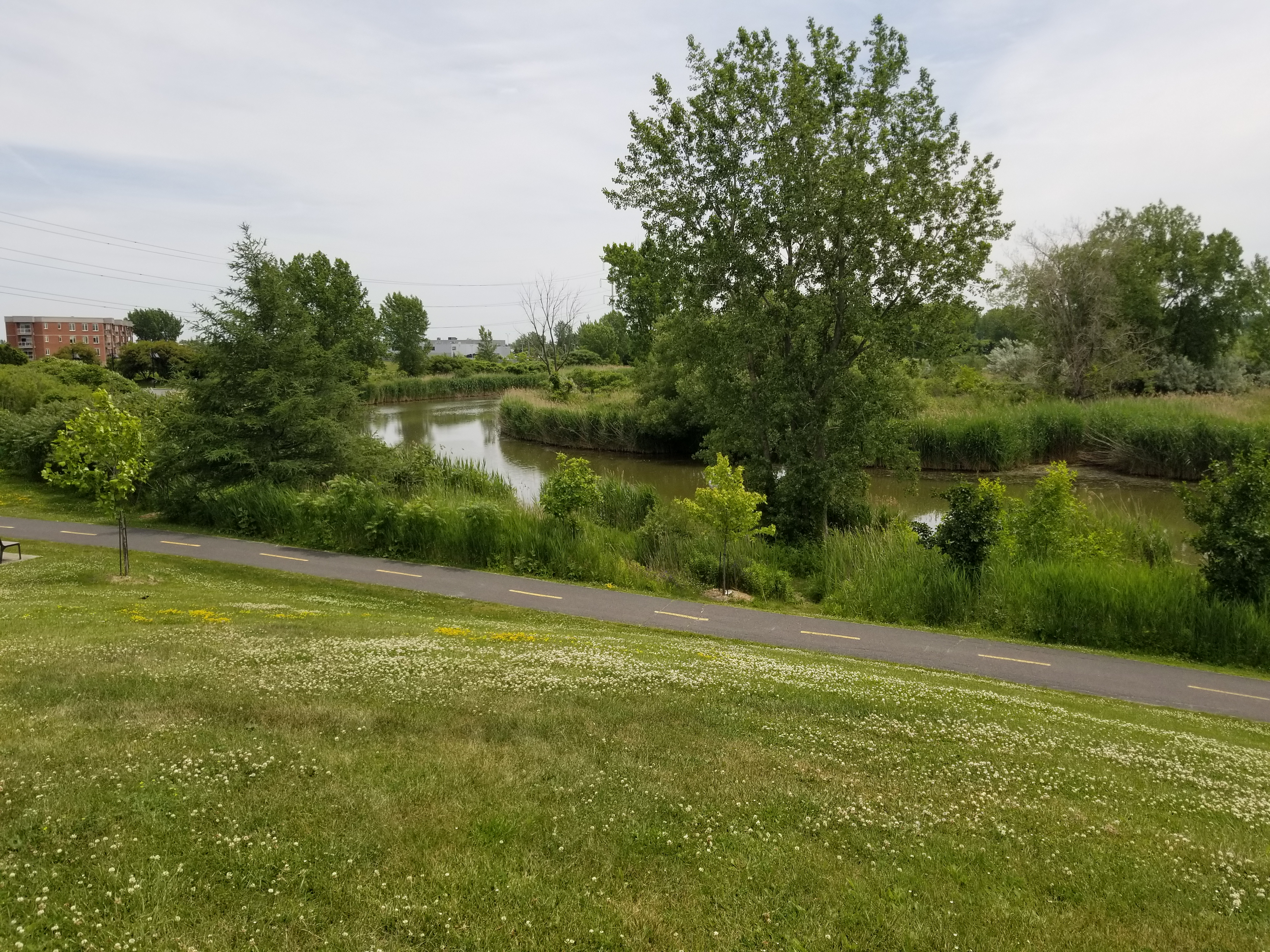
Rivière Saint-Jacques, vu du parc Radisson à Brossard le 27 juin 2018.

Course downstream of Autoroute 10 (segment of 7.0 kilometres (4.3 mi))

After crossing the Autoroute 10 at 1.0 kilometre (0.62 mi) east of the A10 junction and the A30, the Saint-Jacques River runs on 1.6 kilometres (0.99 mi) to the northwest in an agricultural zone until the autoroute 30 which it crosses at 0.8 kilometres (0.50 mi) north of the junction of the A10 and the A30. Then the river flows northwest (4.3 kilometres (2.7 mi) past the Brossard, Quebec Illinois Park and serpentine to route 134, which is Taschereau Boulevard. This last segment of the river passes east of Parc Émilie-Gamelin in La Prairie, Quebec and collects the waters of Saint-Claude stream (coming from the east) whose main tributaries are the "ruisseau des Bois" and the "Battle Creek". In this last segment, the Saint-Jacques River runs westward across a golf course and serving more or less of a boundary between the cities of Brossard, Quebec and La Prairie, Quebec.

=== Meandering course ===
A common characteristic of rivers, such as this one, that flow through sedimentary soil of lowlands is the formation of bends and oxbow lakes along its course. This meandering course is due to the erosion of the soil. One notable oxbow lake along this river is located in the territory of Brossard, forming an island (at 45.423666°N 73.46843°W)..

== Regional Park of the Saint-Jacques River ==
The creation of the Saint-Jacques Regional Park is sponsored by the Ville-Marie Priority Intervention Area Committee (ZIP). The area between Taschereau Boulevard and Autoroute 30 includes public lands whose transfers to cities are yet to be completed. In the long term, this regional park project aims to encompass the Boisé de Brossard (largely composed of private land) and the "Boisé de la Commune" in La Prairie (entirely composed of private land).

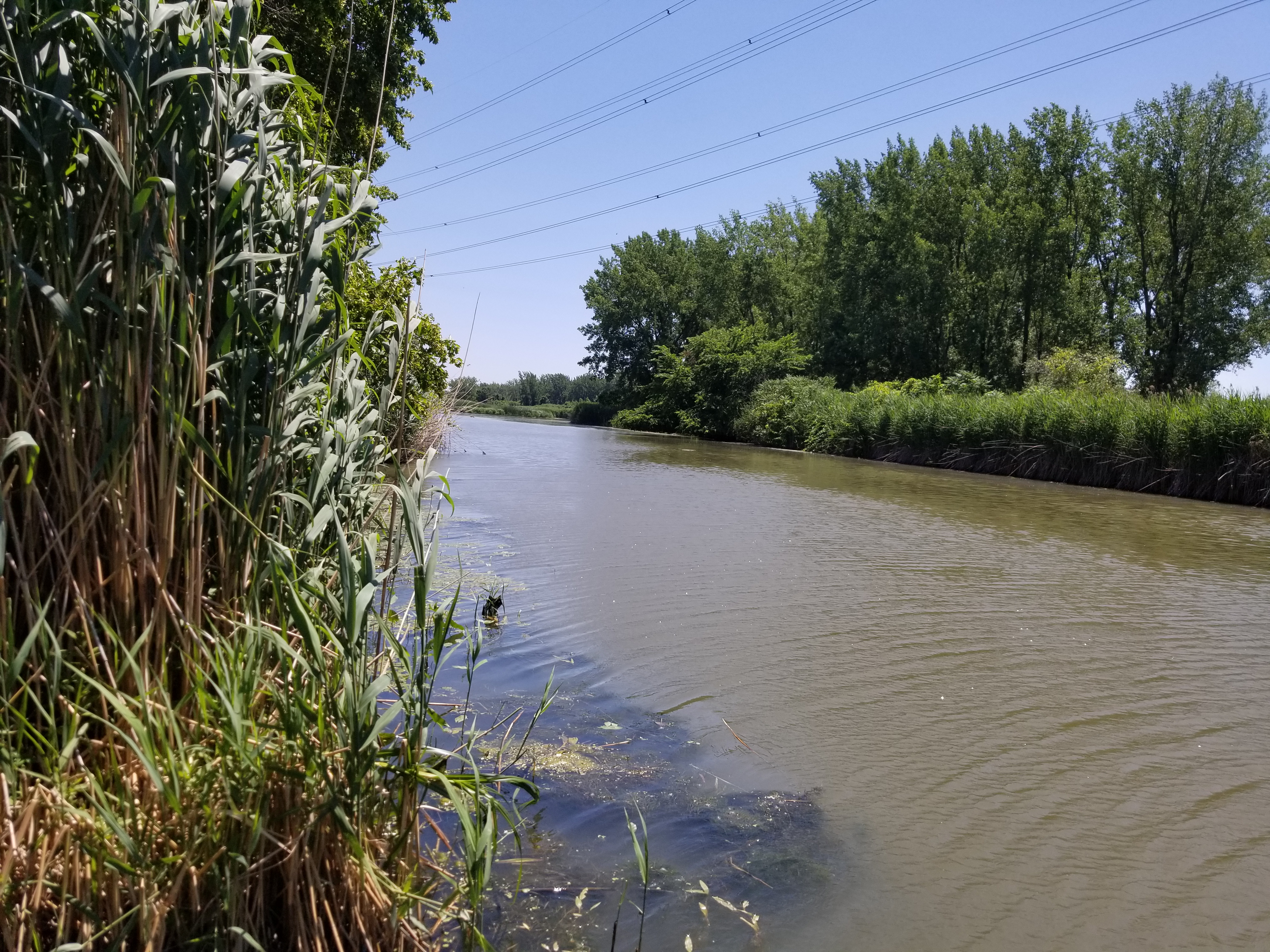
Saint-Jacques seen from North shore in Saint-Jacques park of Brossard as of July, 9th 2018.

From the seaway, this river is navigable by canoe and kayak to the east of Autoroute 30. This watercourse, which delimits the towns of Brossard and La Prairie, Quebec, is surrounded by former farmland. Its banks, which are generally bare of trees, include turtles and water birds such as ducks and herons. Hypothetically, this area could be transformed into a regional park encompassing the surrounding woodlands; this park could cover a larger area than the Mont-Saint-Bruno National Park. The river is accessible via Radisson Park where visitors can rent river boats.

In December 2014, the City of Brossard acquired for a million dollars a strip of 50-meter (55-yard) wide riparian lands covering 9830 square meters (2½ acres), between Radisson Park and Taschereau Boulevard, with the objective of protecting this waterfront.

== History ==
=== Early 17th century ===
The Saint-Jacques River was first described by Samuel de Champlain in his notes on his 1611 voyage along the Saint Lawrence River and in the area around La Place Royale on the Island of Montreal:

Le 7 iour ie fut recognoistre une petite rivière par où vont quelquefois les Sauvages à la guerre, qui se va rendre au sault de la rivière des Hiroquois: elle est fort plaisante, y ayant plus de trois lieues de circuit de prairies et forces terres qui se peuvent labourer. Elle est à une lieue du grand sault, & une lieu & demie de la Place Royale.

— Samuel de Champlain

== See also ==
- Roussillon Regional County Municipality
- St. Lawrence River, un cours d'eau
- St. Lawrence Seaway
- Brossard, a city
- La Prairie, a city
- List of rivers of Quebec
