= Brosseau Station =

- Interactive map of Brosseau Station
- Coordinates: 45.433333°N 73.466667°W
- Country: Canada
- Province: Quebec
- Region: Montérégie
- RCM: None
- Agglomeration: Longueuil
- City: Brossard

Brosseau Station or Brosseau is a former village and former railway station in the present city of Brossard, Quebec, Canada.

== 1953 house fire ==
A fire in December 1953 killed three children.

== 1956 railway accident ==
Two railway workers were killed in a train wreck in Brosseau in 1956.
