= Alejandro Saravia (writer) =

Bolivian-Canadian writer

- Born: Cochabamba, Bolivia
- Education: Catholic University (Communication), Universidad Mayor de San Andrés (Literature), University of Montreal, University of Ottawa
- Occupations: Writer, journalist
- Known for: Novel Rojo, amarillo y verde
- Notable work: Rojo, amarillo y verde

Alejandro Saravia is a Bolivian-Canadian writer, born in Cochabamba (Bolivia).

== Biography ==
Born in Cochabamba, Bolivia, Saravia currently lives in Brossard, Quebec, Canada, and works as a journalist in Montreal. He studied Communication at the Catholic University, and Literature at the Universidad Mayor de San Andrés (La Paz), as well as at the University of Montreal and the University of Ottawa (Canada).

The publication of his novel, Rojo, amarillo y verde (2003), which is about the last Bolivian coup d'État and the experiences of its central character, Alfredo Cutipa, in Canada, made him one of the contemporary Latino-Canadians dedicated to the topic of immigration and identity construction in a multicultural context.

In addition to participating in literary conferences and readings in Montreal, Ottawa, Toronto, Calgary, and Vancouver, he has taken part in events such as Havana's Festival of Poetry and Art, the Rhythm and Colour Festival at Toronto's Harbourfront Centre, Yellow Door Readings, and Montreal's international literary festival, Metropolis Bleu. Some of his writings have been published in magazines and newspapers in Montreal, Toronto, and Ottawa. He has also been part of electronic publications edited in Mexico, Boston, and Caracas.

His writing also figures in a number of collective works and anthologies such as Borealis Antología Literaria de El Dorado (Verbum Veritas – La cita trunca Editores, Ottawa, 2011), Dieciocho voces de la poesía hispano-canadiense (Acento Editores, Guadalajara, México, 2009), Cuentos de nuestra palabra en Canadá: primera hornada (Editorial Nuestra Palabra, Toronto, 2009), Las imposturas de Eros, cuentos de amor en la posmodernidad (Editorial Lugar Común, Ottawa, 2009), The Fourth River (Chatham University, Pittsburgh, 2009) Retrato de una nube, Primera antología del cuento hispano canadiense (Editorial Lugar Común, Ottawa, 2008), La poésie prend le métro (Éditions Adage, Montréal, 2004) and Boreal, Antología de poesía latinoamericana en Canadá (Editorial Verbum Veritas – La cita trunca, Ottawa, 2002).

He is currently a member of the editorial collective of The Apostles Review, a Montreal-based literary publication that comes out twice a year.

== List of works ==
- Rojo, amarillo y verde (Editorial Artifact Press / Les éditions de la naine blanche – 2003) (novel)
  - Sauline Letendre, transl. French: Rouge, jaune et vert, Éditions Urubu (John Glassco Translation Prize 2018)
- Ejercicio de serpientes (1994) (poetry)
- La brújula desencadenada (1996) (poetry)
- Oilixes helizados (1998) (poetry)
- Habitante del décimo territorio (2000) (poetry)
- Lettres de Nootka (2008) (poetry)
- Jaguar con corazón en la mano (2010) (poetry)
- Cuarenta momentos chilenos (2013) (poetry)
- L'homme polyphonique (2014) (poetry)
