= Langtoft =

Langtoft may refer to:

- Langtoft, East Riding of Yorkshire, England
- Langtoft, Lincolnshire, England
- Peter Langtoft (died 1305), English historian and chronicler of the 13th century
