= La Prairie, Quebec =

La Prairie
- City
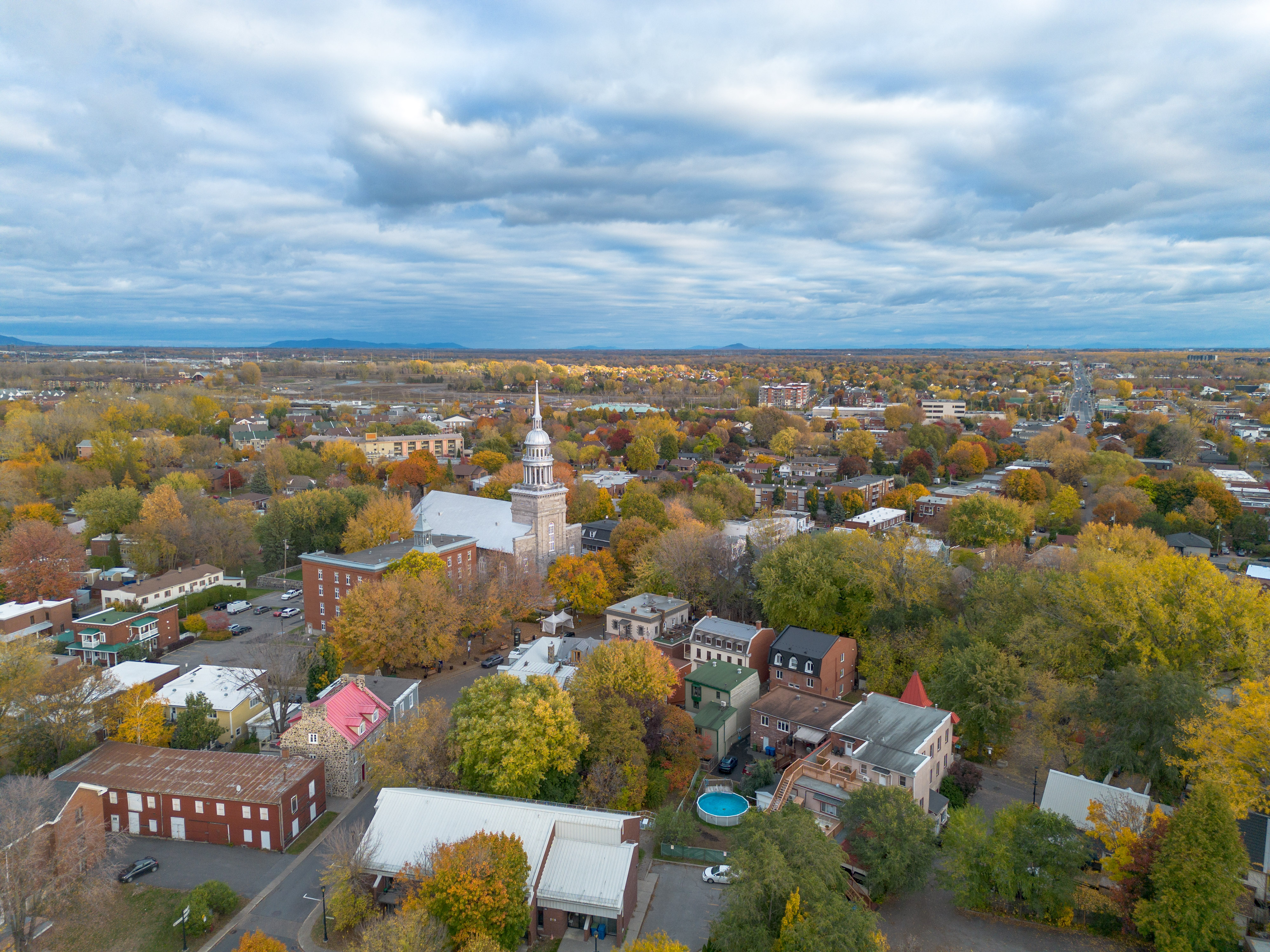
- Old La Prairie in 2025

- Coat of arms
- Motto(s): Victor Hostium et Sui (Latin for "Master of our Enemies and Oneself")
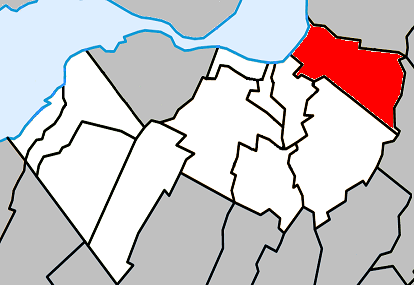
- Location within Roussillon RCM

- Location in southern Quebec
- Coordinates: 45.42°N 73.5°W
- Country: Canada
- Province: Quebec
- Region: Montérégie
- RCM: Roussillon
- Constituted: March 30, 1846

Government
  - Mayor: Frédéric Galantai
  - Federal riding: La Prairie
  - Prov. riding: La Prairie

Area
  - Total: 54.80 km^{2} (21.16 sq mi)
  - Land: 43.47 km^{2} (16.78 sq mi)

Population (2021)
  - Total: 26,406
  - Density: 607.4/km^{2} (1,573/sq mi)
  - Pop 2016–2021: ▲9.5%
  - Dwellings: 11,309
- Demonym(s): Laprairien,(ienne) (French)
- Time zone: UTC−5 (EST)
  - Summer (DST): UTC−4 (EDT)
- Postal code(s): J5R
- Area codes: 450 and 579
- Highways A-15 A-30: R-104; R-132; R-134; R-217
- Website: www.ville.laprairie.qc.ca

La Prairie (French pronunciation: [la pʁɛʁi]) is an off-island suburb (south shore) of Montreal, in southwestern Quebec, Canada, at the confluence of the Saint-Jacques River and the Saint Lawrence River in the Regional County Municipality of Roussillon. The population as of the Canada 2021 Census was 26,406.

== History ==
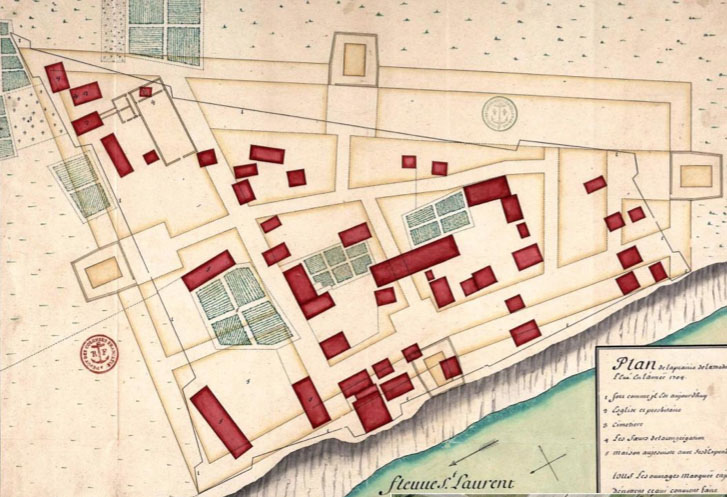
Plan of La Prairie de la Magdelaine in 1704

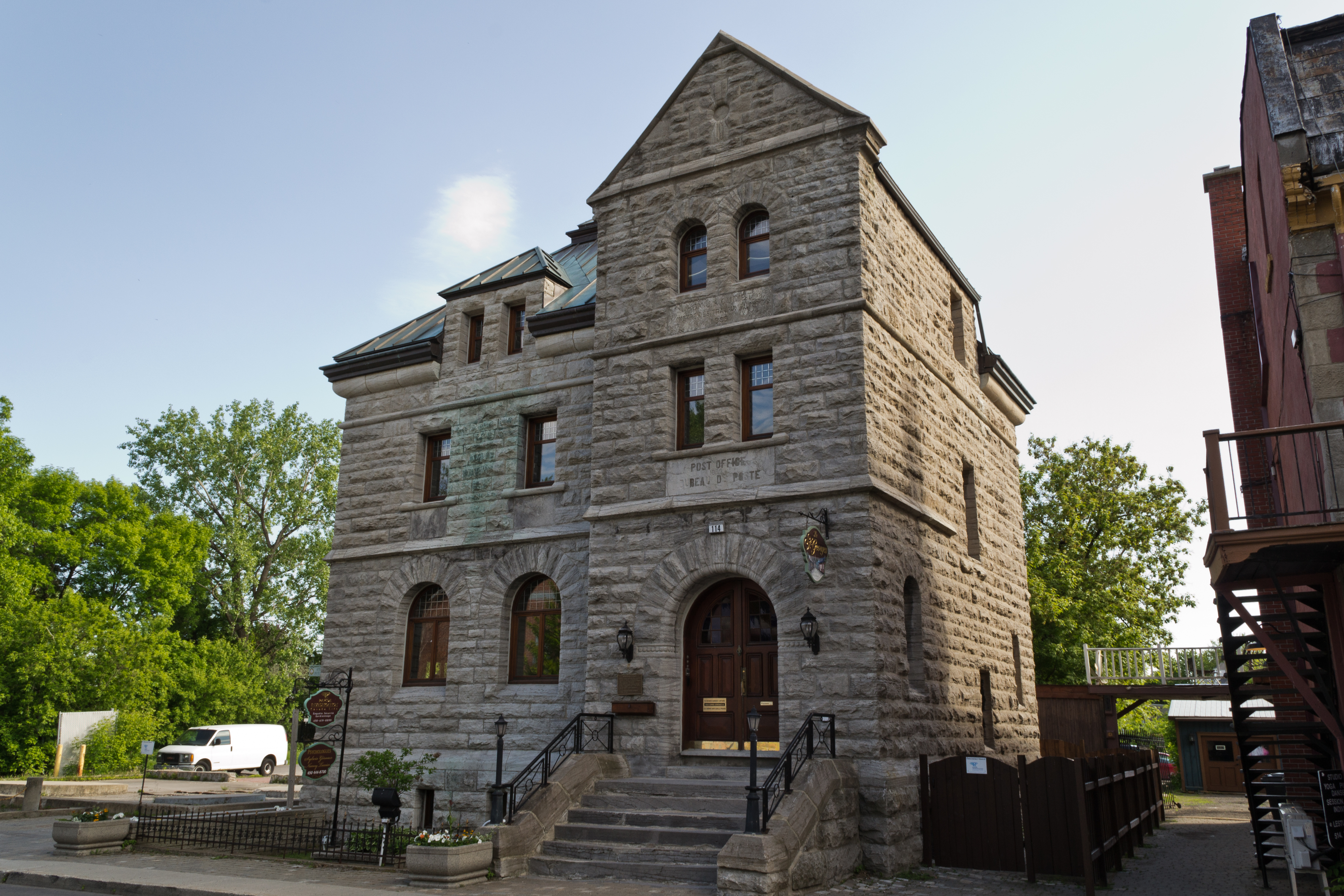
The old post office of La Prairie.

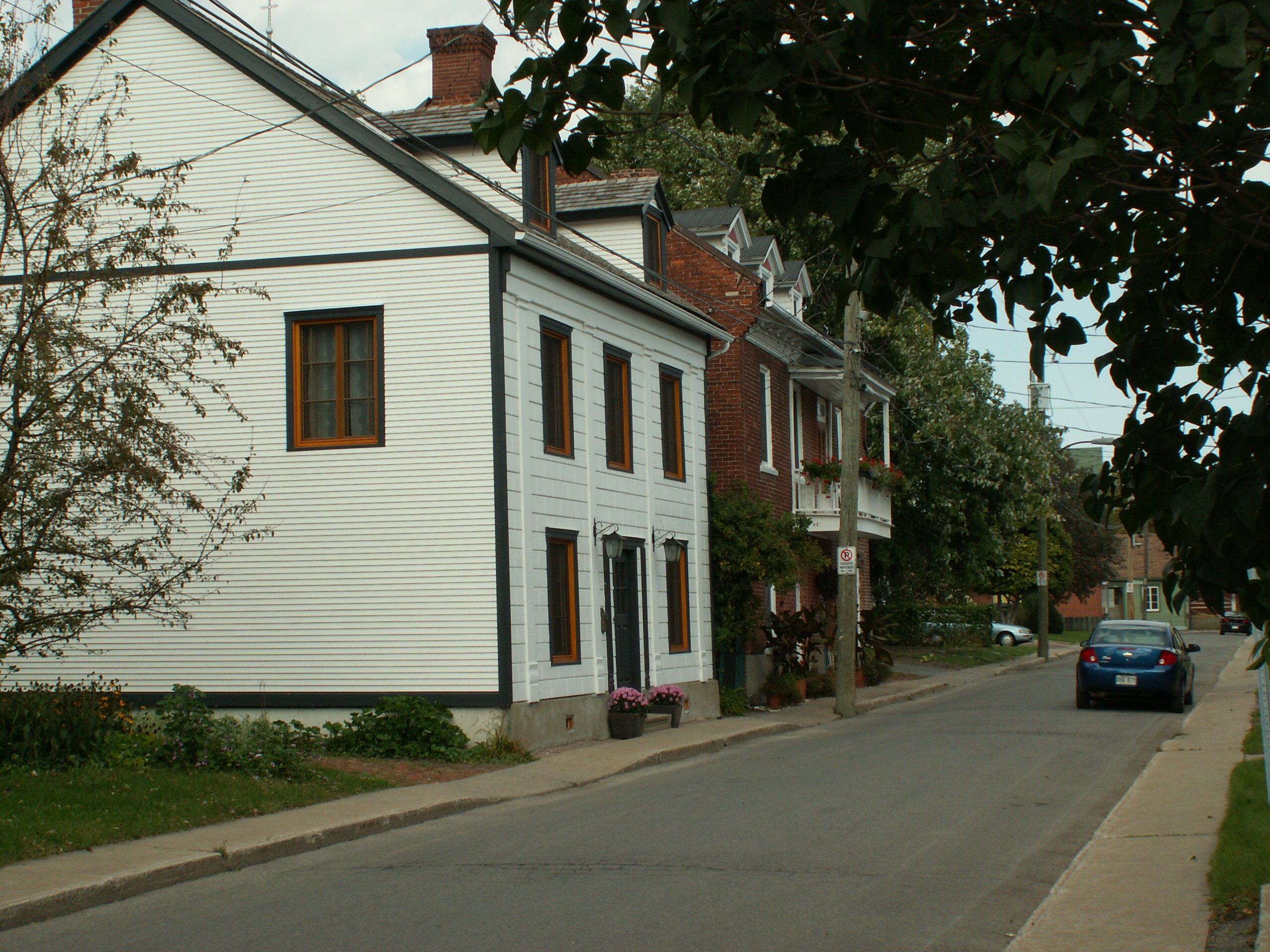
Houses in Old La Prairie

French Jesuits were the first Europeans to occupy the area, which was named La Prairie de la Magdelaine but was also called François-Xavier-des-Prés. The land was given to the Jesuits by Jacques de La Ferté and the Company of One Hundred Associates in 1647. It is in La Prairie that the story Kateri Tekakwitha took place.

In 1667, the site was settled by a small group of Oneida people, joined the following year by Mohawk refugees from the destroyed village of Caughnawaga. They named the site Kenhtà:ke, possibly a variant of a Haudenosaunee word for "at the prairie", and were joined by more groups of Indigenous people over the subsequent decade. In 1676, in response to the wetness and infertility of the site, the Haudenosaunee at Kenhtà:ke moved to settle a new village at Kahnawake.

In the beginning of modern Quebec history, the territory of La Prairie would be visited on numerous occasions by Haudenosaunee and English settlers from New York, among others at the time of the Anglo-Haudenosaunee expedition of Pieter Schuyler in 1691, who commanded two battles on August 11, 1691.

The close of the Seven Years' War led to the 1763 treaty ending the French and Indian War. New France, sparsely populated by indigenous peoples and descendants of French colonists, was ceded by France and divided into British colonies. The territory of La Prairie became part of the Province of Quebec (1763–1791) within the British Empire.

In 1845, the village of La Prairie was established. One year later, La Prairie-de-la-Magdelaine was established. La Prairie was the seat of Laprairie County (1855-1980s), which included the parishes of La Prairie, Notre-Dame, Ste-Catherine, St-Constant, St-Isidore, St-Jacques-le-Mineur, St-Mathieu and St-Philippe. In 1909, La Prairie obtained official city status.

Historically, the city has been an important transportation hub, as it was the point of transfer between Montreal ferries and the land route to Saint-Jean-sur-Richelieu, gateway to Lake Champlain and the Hudson River. The first railway line in British North America, the Champlain and St. Lawrence Railroad, connected it with Saint-Jean-sur-Richelieu on July 21, 1836; the railway ran over 16 miles (26 km). The construction of a rail line between La Prairie and Saint-Jean-sur-Richelieu would greatly accelerate the commercial development of the village. River transport equally played an important role in La Prairie's history.

== Geography ==
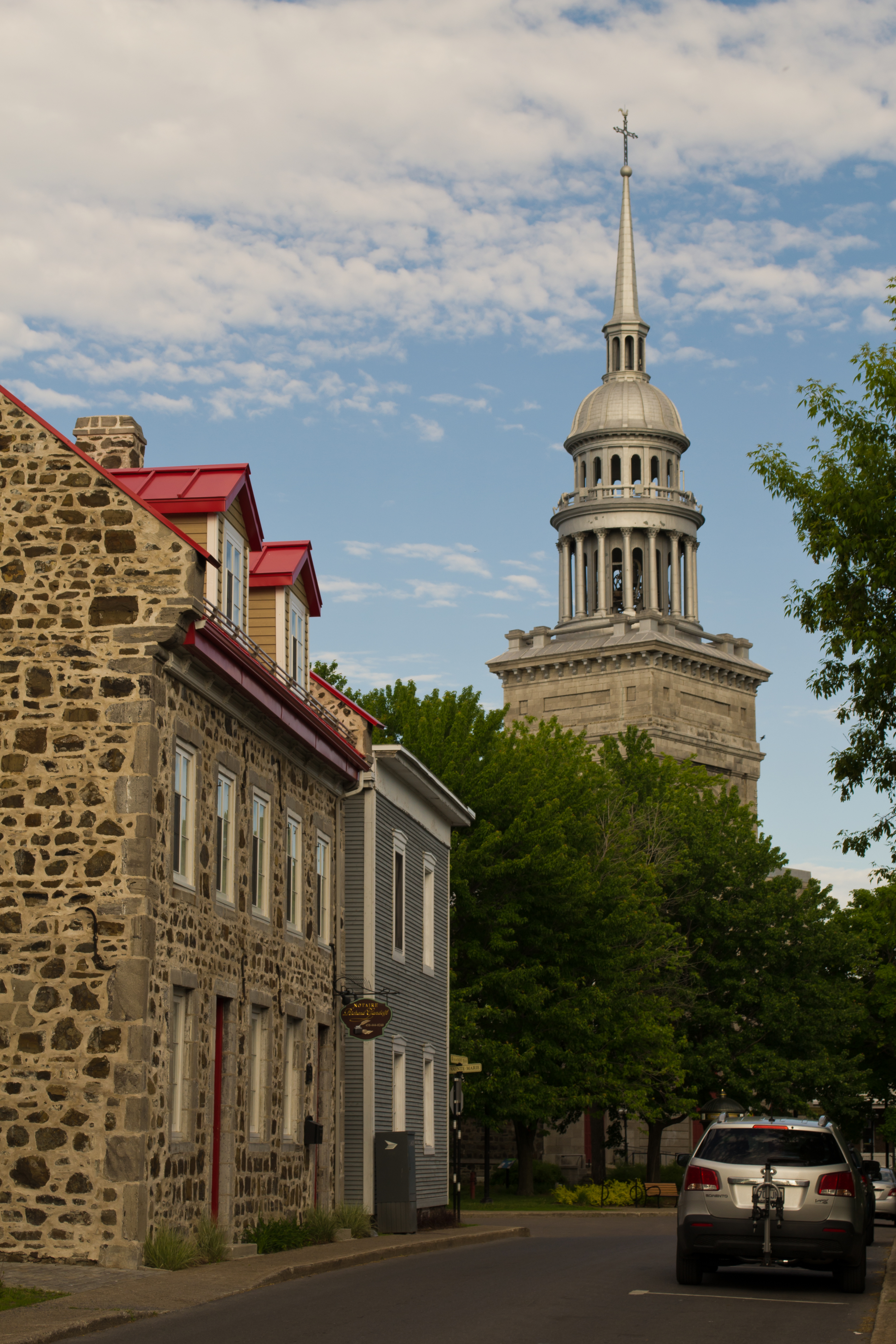
Saint-Jean Road

=== Climate ===
Like the rest of southwestern Quebec, La Prairie has hot summers and cold winters, for a generally temperate climate. Winters are cold and sometimes long (snow is usually present from mid-November to mid-April), with temperatures occasionally dipping below -30 °C, not counting the windchill. During snowstorms, snowfall frequently surpasses 40 centimeters. In the summer, temperatures sometimes exceed 30 °C.

=== Environment ===
In 2013, Grand Boisé conservation park is planned to be created and orchestrated by Nature-Action. The park would include Smithers' swamp, as well as, Hydro-Quebec's servitude area in which the western chorus frog, a vulnerable species in Quebec, is found in greatest numbers. There is a controversy involving the city housing development in that area which was supposed to be conserved integrally with high priority according to RCM of Roussillon 1990s' maps. Local environmental organisms, such as Vigile verte and Projet Rescousse, are denouncing the choice of that land for housing development. The debate is ongoing.

== Demographics ==
Historical Census Data – La Prairie, Quebec
Year	Pop.	±%
1851	814	—
1861	1,523	+87.1%
1871	1,259	−17.3%
1881	1,340	+6.4%
1891	1,246	−7.0%
1901	1,451	+16.5%
1911	2,388	+64.6%
1921	2,158	−9.6%
1931	2,774	+28.5%
1941	2,936	+5.8%
1951	4,058	+38.2%
1956	5,372	+32.4%
1961	7,328	+36.4%
1966	8,122	+10.8%
1971	8,309	+2.3%
1976	9,173	+10.4%
1981	10,627	+15.9%
1986	11,072	+4.2%
1991	15,237	+37.6%
1996	17,128	+12.4%
2001	18,896	+10.3%
2006	21,763	+15.2%
2011	23,357	+7.3%
2016	24,110	+3.2%
2021	26,406	+9.5%

In the 2021 Census of Population conducted by Statistics Canada, La Prairie had a population of 26,406 living in 11,049 of its 11,309 total private dwellings, a change of 9.5% from its 2016 population of 24,110. With a land area of 43.47 km^{2} (16.78 sq mi), it had a population density of 607.5/km^{2} (1,573.3/sq mi) in 2021.

Canada census – La Prairie community profile

	2021	2016	2011
Population	26,406 (+9.5% from 2016)	24,110 (+3.2% from 2011)	23,357 (+7.3% from 2006)
Land area	43.47 km^{2} (16.78 sq mi)	43.68 km^{2} (16.86 sq mi)	43.28 km^{2} (16.71 sq mi)
Population density	607.4/km^{2} (1,573/sq mi)	552/km^{2} (1,430/sq mi)	539.7/km^{2} (1,398/sq mi)
Median age	42.8 (M: 42.4, F: 43.6)	41.4 (M: 41, F: 41.9)	39.2 (M: 38.5, F: 39.7)
Private dwellings	11,309 (total) 11,049 (occupied)	9,947 (total)	9,346 (total)
Median household income	$91,000	$79,881	$74,167

References: 2021 2016 2011

Mother tongue language
Canada Census Mother Tongue – La Prairie, Quebec
Census	Total	French			English			French & English			Other		
Year	Responses	Count	Trend	Pop %	Count	Trend	Pop %	Count	Trend	Pop %	Count	Trend	Pop %
2021	25,285	19,540	▼1.6%	74.4%	1,260	▲27.3%	4.8%	465	▲66.1%	1.8%	4,490	▲72.0%	17.1%
2016	23,985	19,860	▲0.4%	82.8%	990	▲7.0%	4.1%	280	▲14.3%	1.2%	2,610	▲34.2%	10.9%
2011	22,895	19,780	▲4.1%	86.4%	925	▲25.0%	4.0%	245	▲113.0%	1.1%	1,945	▲17.5%	8.5%
2006	21,520	19,010	▲13.5%	88.3%	740	▲2.1%	3.4%	115	▼25.8%	0.5%	1,655	▲89.1%	7.7%
2001	18,500	16,745	▲12.6%	90.5%	725	▲26.1%	3.9%	155	▼13.9%	0.8%	875	▼18.6%	4.7%
1996	16,700	14,870	n/a	89.0%	575	n/a	3.4%	180	n/a	1.1%	1,075	n/a	6.4%

Native language	Population	Pct (%)
French	19,540	74.4%
English	1,260	4.8%
Both English and French	465	1.8%
French and a non-official language	290	1.1%
Spanish	785	3.0%
Mandarin	770	2.9%
Arabic	465	1.8%
Romanian	340	1.3%
Yue	295	1.1%
Portuguese	270	1.0%

== Infrastructure ==
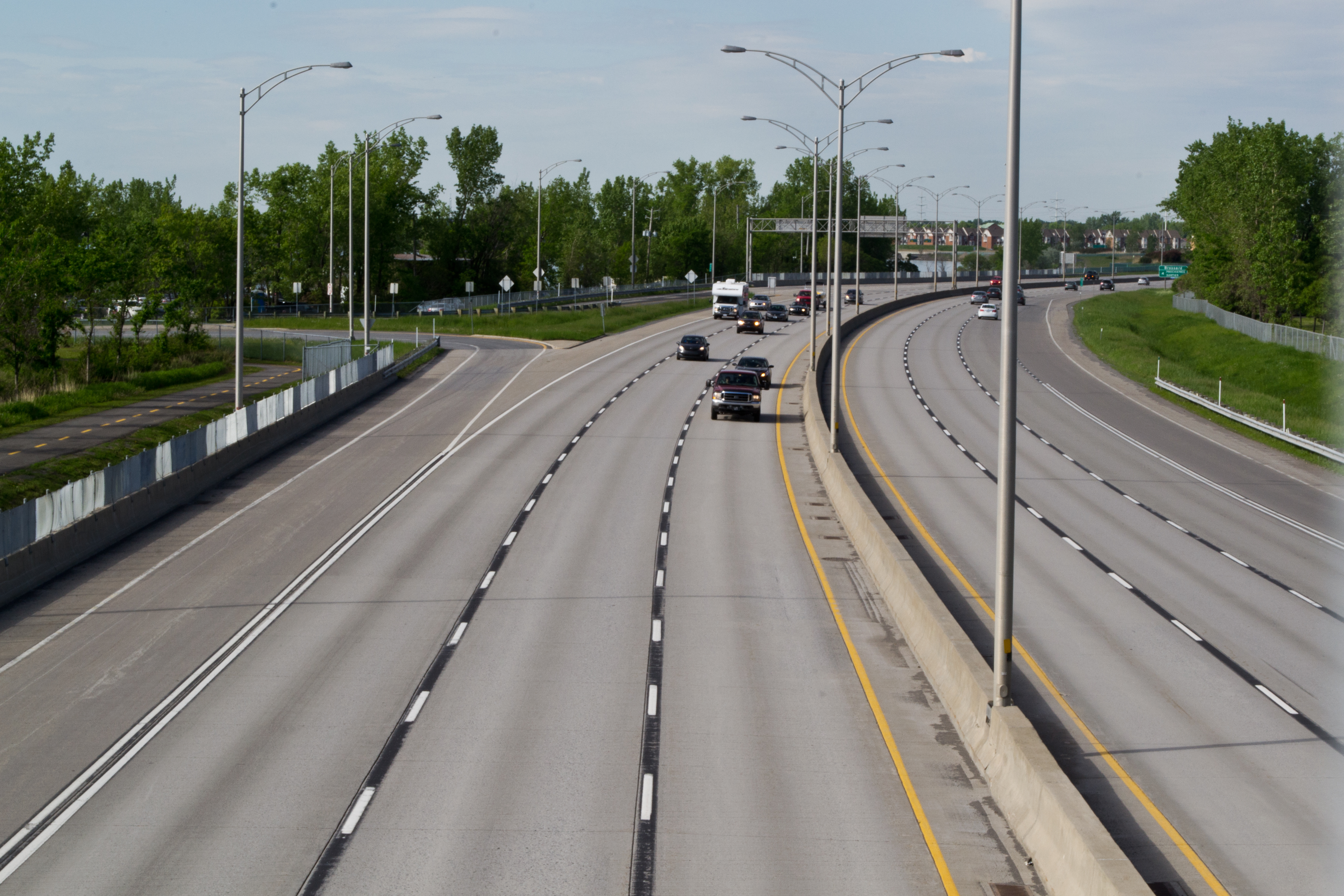
Quebec Route 132 in La Prairie.

The CIT Le Richelain provides commuter and local bus services.

== Education ==
The town has three high schools: l'École de la Magdeleine, a public French school which offers the International Baccalaureate (IB) Programme, Collège Jean de la Mennais, a private mixed French school and Saint-François-Xavier, a public French school.

The South Shore Protestant Regional School Board previously served the municipality.

== Notable people ==
- Hermine Lanctôt (1861-1943), author, journalist, and schoolteacher
- Euclide Sicotte (1901-1969), photographer

== Gallery ==
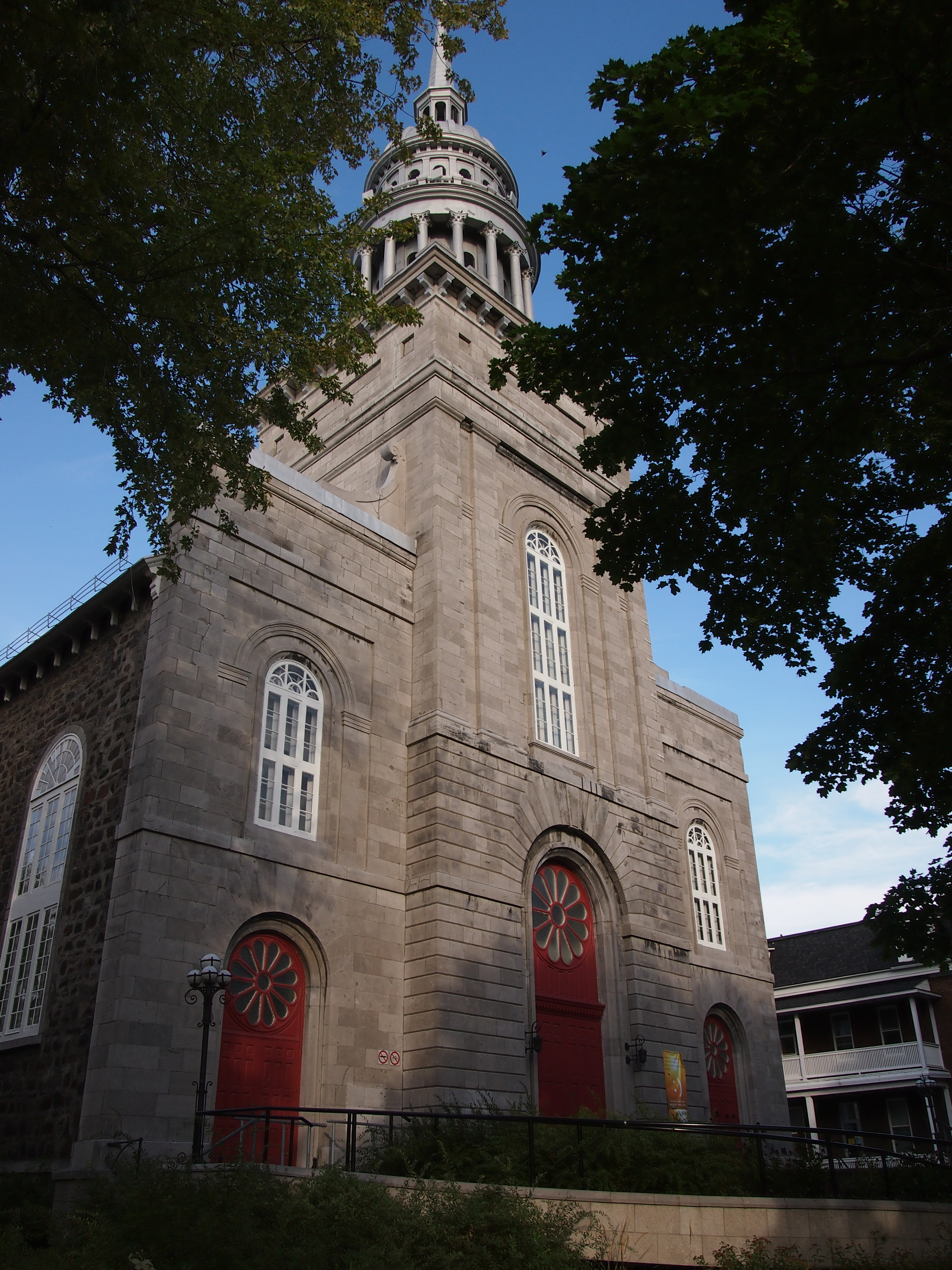
Church of La Nativité de la Sainte-Vierge in La Prairie

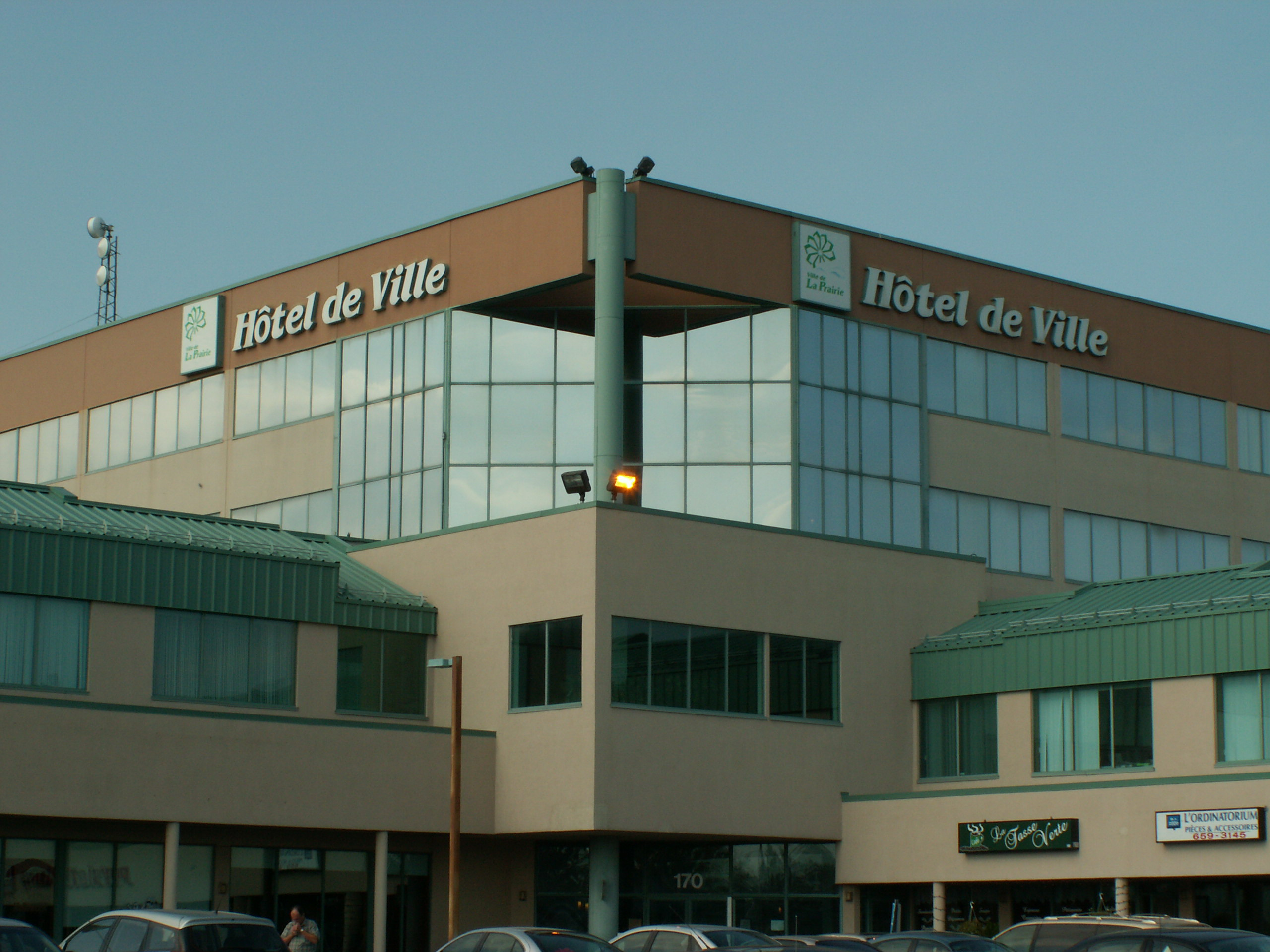
City Hall

== See also ==
- Saint Lawrence River
- Saint Jacques River (Roussillon)
- Brossard—La Prairie
- La Prairie (provincial electoral district)
- List of cities in Quebec
