= Alejandro Saravia (chef) =

Peruvian chef (born 1983)

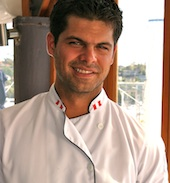
- Born: June 13, 1982 (age 43); Lima, Peru
- Culinary career
- Cooking style: Peruvian
- Current restaurant: "Farmer's Daughters' 'Victoria by Farmer's Daughters'
- Television show(s): Getaway (Channel NINE). SBS Food Safari, Channel NINE – Mornings with Kerri-Anne
- Website: www.farmersdaughters.com.au www.victoriarestaurant.com.au

Alejandro Saravia is a Peruvian chef who was born in Lima, Peru on June 13, 1982, and has lived in Australia since 2006. He is the co-owner and Executive Chef at Farmer's Daughters in Melbourne and Victoria by Farmer's Daughters in Fed Square, Melbourne.

Saravia studied marketing at university and worked as a brand manager before following his passion for food to train as a chef. He travelled the world for many years, embracing many different cultures and styles of cuisine and honing his chef skills while working at renowned restaurants such as Heston Blumenthal’s Fat Duck and Les Ambassadeurs (Paris), Pier Restaurant, Salon Blanc, Opera Bar and Sails Restaurant at Lavender (Lavender Bay) in Sydney.

Since 2007 Alejandro has also run his own company, “A taste of PERú” which demonstrates and educates foodies in the ingredients, flavours and cooking methods of Peru through degustation nights of Modern Peruvian Cuisine, Cooking Classes and Gourmet tours to his home country.

Alejandro Saravia has contributed to many events such as the “Peruvian Fiesta at the Intercontinental” (2008); the Maritime Museum’s “Food Festival Lima City of Kings” (2008) and “Food Festival Pacific on a Plate” (2007), as well as featuring as part of the Electrolux Cooking School in Melbourne with his Peruvian Master Classes (2010). He will also be continuing his classes at The Electrolux Cooking School in 2011 with three classes from August 19–21.

Alejandro has featured on Channel Ten's The Circle, , SBS Television's Food Safari SBS - Ceviche segment, with his signature Ceviche dish, on Mornings with Kerri-Anne (Channel Nine) to promote Peruvian Cuisine and recently filmed a segment for Getaway (Channel NINE) with Jules Lund which aired on July 5, 2011 Click Here to view episode.\

In both 2018 and in January 2019, Alejandro was invited to represent his Farmer’s Daughters concept as part of the esteemed AO Chef Series at the Australian Open.

Alejandro is a 2021 ambassador for the Dine Smart initiative by Street Smart Australia.

== Restaurants ==
In October 2011 Alejandro Saravia opened his first restaurant, MORENA, situated in Sydney's Surry Hills and recently appeared alongside compatriot celebrity chef, Gaston Acurio at (the) Sydney Magazine's World Chefs Showcase Gala Dinner for the Crave Sydney International Food Festival.

In 2014, Alejandro opened Pastuso in Melbourne's AC/DC lane as part of the San Telmo group.

In October 2021, Alejandro announced that he would be leaving Pastuso to pursue other projects including his three-storey venue Farmer's Daughters in Melbourne's CBD.

Alejandro has also opened the Peruvian restaurant Uma by Alejandro Saravia at Perth's Pan Pacific Hotel as well as a vegan restaurant 10 Acre Block.

In January 2021, Alejandro Saravia launched Farmer's Daughters a three storey farm-to-table concept in Melbourne's prestigious 80 Collins Precinct. Designed to showcase the abundant food bowl of Gippsland and tell the stories of its producers, people and places.

In July 2022, Alejandro Saravia opened Victoria by Farmer's Daughters in Fed Square. The groundbreaking culinary experience overlooks the Yarra River and is focused on unearthing ingredients, produce, wine and drink exclusively from within the state of Victoria.
