= Hermine Lanctôt =

French-Canadian author, journalist, and schoolteacher (1861–1943)

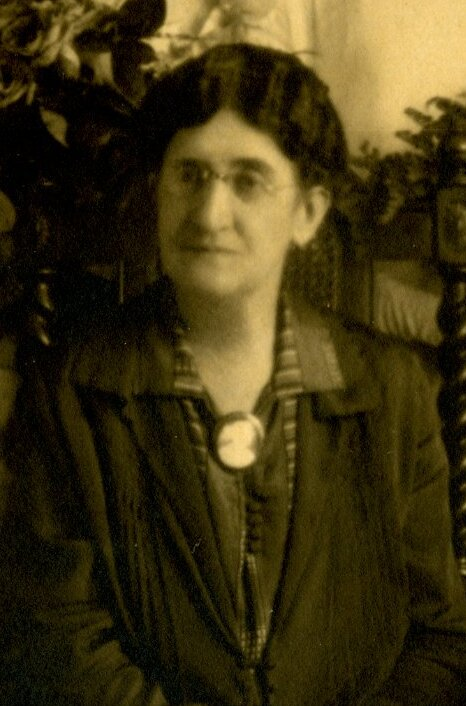
- Lanctôt in the mid 1920s
- Born: 5 August 1861; La Prairie, Quebec, Canada
- Died: 9 April 1943 (aged 81); Montreal, Quebec, Canada
- Occupations: Author; journalist; teacher
- Writing career
- Pen name: Hermance, Ninette, Angéline
- Language: French

Hermine Lanctôt (5 August 1861 – 9 April 1943), known by the pseudonyms Hermance, Ninette and Angéline, was a French-Canadian author, journalist, and teacher.

== Early life and education ==
Lanctôt was born on 5 August 1861, in La Prairie, Quebec. Her parents were Philomène Ménard and Théophile Lanctôt.

She attended school at the Convent of the Dames de la Congrégation and later at the Académie Marchand.

== Career ==
Starting in 1884, she wrote more than a hundred articles for several Montreal magazines, such as Le Monde illustré and Le Recueil littéraire, under various pseudonyms, including "Hermance", "Ninette", and "Angéline"..

She began teaching in 1877, first as an elementary schoolteacher, then, in 1909, by founding the girls’ high school Les Hirondelles, also known as the Institut Lanctôt, located at 204 Saint-Joseph Boulevard West in Montreal. where students included, for example, pianist Germaine Malépart and actress Suzanne Paquette-Goyette. A former student, Françoise Saint-Germain, succeeded her as headmistress of the school in the 1930s.

In 1899, she published a collection of poems, Fleurs enfantines, and in 1913, the text of a lecture on Letizia Bonaparte. As one of the first women writers in French Canada, she was cited, for example, in a 1922 article on women's literature in Canada and was the subject of chapters in anthologies of biographies of female authors and of famous women from Quebec.

== Death ==
Hermine Lanctôt died in Montreal, on April 9, 1943, at the age of 81..

== Selected works ==
- Lanctôt, Hermine (1899). Compagnie d'imprimerie Guertin (ed.). Fleurs enfantines, ouvrage illustré contenant les portraits de soixante-dix-sept de nos enfants canadiens et des pages spécialement écrites par de nos meilleures plumes canadiennes [Fleurs enfantines, an illustrated work containing portraits of seventy-seven of our Canadian children and pages specially written by some of our best Canadian writers] (in French). Montréal.
- Lanctôt, Hermine (1919). Librairie Beauchemin Limitée (ed.). Madame Lætitia Bonaparte : conférence donnée aux Dames bienfaitrices de l'Institution des sourdes-muettes [Madame Lætitia Bonaparte: Lecture given to the benefactresses of the Institution for Deaf-Mute Women] (in French). Montréal.
